= List of Australian rules football clubs in Australia =

This is a list of clubs that play Australian rules football in Australia at the senior level. Guide to abbreviations:

- FC = Football Club
- AFC = Australian Football Club (mainly used if in Queensland or NSW or outside Australia) / Amateur Football Club (mainly used in the other Australian States)
- ARFC = Australian Rules Football Club

== Australia ==
=== National Level ===
==== Australian Football League ====
Colours	Club Name	Founded	Joined VFL/AFL	Ground(s)	Location
	Adelaide Crows	1990	1991	Adelaide Oval	Adelaide, South Australia
	Brisbane Lions	1996	1997	Brisbane Cricket Ground	Brisbane, Queensland
	Carlton Blues	1864	1897	Marvel Stadium; Melbourne Cricket Ground	Melbourne, Victoria
	Collingwood Magpies	1892	1897	Melbourne Cricket Ground	Melbourne, Victoria
	Essendon Bombers	1872	1897	Marvel Stadium	Melbourne, Victoria
	Fremantle Dockers	1994	1995	Perth Stadium	Perth, Western Australia
	Geelong Cats	1859	1897	Kardinia Park; Melbourne Cricket Ground	Geelong, Victoria
	Gold Coast Suns	2008	2011	Metricon Stadium; Marrara Oval	Gold Coast, Queensland
	Great. West. Sydney; Giants	2008	2012	Manuka Oval; Sydney Cricket Ground	Western Sydney, New South Wales
	Hawthorn Hawks	1902	1925	Melbourne Cricket Ground; York Park	Melbourne, Victoria
	Melbourne Demons	1858	1897	Melbourne Cricket Ground	Melbourne, Victoria
	North Melbourne Kangaroos	1869	1925	Marvel Stadium; Bellerive Oval	Melbourne, Victoria; Hobart, Tasmania
	Port Adelaide Power	1870	1997	Adelaide Oval	Adelaide, South Australia
	Richmond Tigers	1885	1908	Marvel Stadium; Melbourne Cricket Ground	Melbourne, Victoria
	St Kilda Saints	1873	1897	Marvel Stadium	Melbourne, Victoria
	Sydney Swans	1874	1897	Sydney Cricket Ground	Sydney, New South Wales
	West Coast Eagles	1986	1987	Perth Stadium	Perth, Western Australia
	Western Bulldogs (Footscray Bulldogs)	1883	1925	Marvel Stadium; Eureka Stadium	Melbourne, Victoria

Former Australian Football League teams

Club	Colours	Moniker	State	Home venue	Est.	Former league	VFL/AFL seasons			VFL/AFL premierships	
Club	Colours	Moniker	State	Home venue	Est.	Former league	First	Last	Total	Total	Last
Brisbane Bears		Bears	Queensland	Carrara Stadium	1986	—	1987	1996	10	0	—
Fitzroy Lions		Lions	Victoria	Brunswick Street Oval	1883	VFA	1897^{+}	1996	100	8	1944
University Students		Students	Victoria	Melbourne Cricket Ground	1859	MJFA	1908	1914	7	0	—
^{+} denotes that the club was a founding member of the VFL

=== Future clubs ===
Club	Colours	Moniker	State	Home venue	Joining league
Tasmania		Devils	Tasmania	Macquarie Point Stadium	2028

=== State Level ===
==== Victorian Football League ====
Colours	Club Name	Founded	Main Ground	Location	Former names
	Box Hill Hawks	1936	Box Hill City Oval	Box Hill, Melbourne, Victoria	Box Hill United, Box Hill City Box hill Mustangs
	Brisbane Lions (R)	1996	South Pine Sports Complex	Brendale, Brisbane, Queensland	
	Carlton Blues (R)	1864	Princes Park	Carlton North, Melbourne, Victoria	
	Casey Demons	1903	Casey Fields	Melbourne, Victoria	Springvale Football Club Casey Scorpions
	Coburg Lions	1891	Coburg City Oval	Coburg, Melbourne, Victoria	Coburg Tigers
	Collingwood Magpies (R)	1892	Victoria Park	Collingwood, Melbourne, Victoria	
	Essendon Bombers (R)	1871	Windy Hill	Essendon, Melbourne, Victoria	
	Footscray Bulldogs (R)	1883	Whitten Oval	Footscray, Melbourne, Victoria	
	Frankston Dolphins	1887	Frankston Park	Frankston, Melbourne, Victoria	
	Geelong Cats (R)	1859	Kardinia Park	Geelong East, Geelong, Victoria	
	Gold Coast Suns (R)	2008	Carrara Stadium	Carrara, Gold Coast, Queensland	
	Great. West. Sydney; Giants (R)	2008	Blacktown ISP Oval	Rooty Hill, Sydney, New South Wales	
	North Melbourne Kangaroos (R)	1869	North Melbourne Cricket Ground	North Melbourne, Melbourne, Victoria	North Melbourne Shinboners, Kangaroos
	Port Melbourne Borough	1874	Port Melbourne Cricket Ground	Port Melbourne, Melbourne, Victoria	
	Richmond Tigers (R)	1885	Punt Road Oval	East Melbourne, Melbourne, Victoria	
	Sandringham Zebras	1929	Trevor Barker Beach Oval	Sandringham, Melbourne, Victoria	
	Southport Sharks	1961	Fankhauser Reserve	Southport, Gold Coast, Queensland	
	St Kilda Saints (R)	1873	Marvel Stadium	Melbourne, Victoria	
	Sydney Swans (R)	1874	SCG	Sydney, New South Wales	South Melbourne Bloods, South Melbourne Swans, Swans
	Tasmania Devils	2023	Various	Launceston, Hobart, Tasmania	
	Werribee Tigers	1965	Avalon Airport Oval	Werribee, Melbourne, Victoria	
	Williamstown Seagulls	1864	Williamstown Cricket Ground	Williamstown, Melbourne, Victoria	

Former Victorian Football League teams

Northern Bullants	1882	Preston City Oval	Preston, Melbourne, Victoria	Northern Blues

==== South Australian National Football League ====
Colours	Club Name	Founded	Main Ground	Location
	Adelaide Crows (R)	1990	Several	Adelaide, South Australia
	Central District Bulldogs	1959	X Convenience Oval	Elizabeth, South Australia
	Glenelg Tigers	1920	ACH Group Stadium	Glenelg, South Australia
	North Adelaide Roosters	1888	Prospect Oval	Prospect, South Australia
	Norwood Redlegs	1878	Coopers Stadium	Norwood, South Australia
	Port Adelaide Magpies (R)	1870	Alberton Oval	Alberton, South Australia
	South Adelaide Panthers	1876	Flinders University Oval	Noarlunga Downs, South Australia
	Sturt Double Blues	1901	Wigan Oval	Unley, South Australia
	West Adelaide Bloods	1873	Hisense Stadium	Richmond, South Australia
	Woodville-West Torrens Eagles	1991	Maughan Thiem Hyundai Oval	Woodville, South Australia

==== West Australian Football League ====
Colours	Club Name	Founded	Main Ground	Location
	Claremont Tigers	1921	Claremont Oval	Perth, Western Australia
	East Fremantle Sharks	1898	East Fremantle Oval	Fremantle, Western Australia
	East Perth Royals	1906	Medibank Stadium	Perth, Western Australia
	Peel Thunder	1997	Rushton Park	Mandurah, Western Australia
	Perth Demons	1899	Eftel Oval	Perth, Western Australia
	South Fremantle Bulldogs	1900	Fremantle Oval	Fremantle, Western Australia
	Subiaco Lions	1896	Medibank Stadium	Perth, Western Australia
	Swan Districts Swans	1934	Steel Blue Oval	Bassendean, Western Australia
	West Coast Eagles (R)	1986	Optus Stadium	Perth, Western Australia
	West Perth Falcons	1885	Arena Joondalup	Joondalup, Western Australia

==== Tasmanian State League ====
Colours	Club Name	Founded	Main Ground	Location
	Clarence Roos	1898	Bellerive Oval	Bellerive, Tasmania
	Glenorchy Magpies	1919	KGV Oval	Glenorchy, Tasmania
	Lauderdale Bombers	1948	Lauderdale Oval	Lauderdale, Tasmania
	Launceston Blues	1875	Windsor Park	Launceston, Tasmania
	North Hobart Demons	1881	North Hobart Oval	Hobart, Tasmania
	North Launceston Bombers	1896	York Park	Launceston, Tasmania
	Tigers	1886	Kingston Twin Ovals	Kingston, Tasmania

==== Northern Territory Football League ====
Colours	Club Name	Founded	Main Ground	Location
	Darwin Buffaloes	1917	Marrara Oval	Darwin, Northern Territory
	Nightcliff Tigers	1950	Nightcliff Oval	Nightcliff, Northern Territory
	Palmerston Magpies	1971	Archer Sporting Complex	Palmerston, Northern Territory
	Southern Districts Crocs	1984	Freds Pass Reserve	Palmerston, Northern Territory
	St Mary's Saints	1952	Marrara Oval	Darwin, Northern Territory
	Tiwi Bombers	2006	Marrara Oval	Darwin, Northern Territory
	Wanderers Eagles	1917	Marrara Oval	Darwin, Northern Territory
	Waratah Warriors	1917	Gardens Oval	Darwin, Northern Territory

Future clubs

Club	Colours	Moniker	State	Home venue	Joining league
Tasmania		Devils	Tasmania	Macquarie Point Stadium	2028

== Victoria ==
=== AFL Victoria ===
==== Eastern Football League ====
- Balwyn Football Club
- Bayswater Football Club
- Belgrave Football Club
- Blackburn Football Club
- Boronia Football Club
- Chirnside Park Football Club
- Coldstream Football Club
- Croydon Football Club
- Doncaster Football Club
- Doncaster East Football Club
- Donvale Football Club
- East Burwood Football Club
- East Ringwood Football Club
- Fair Park Football Club
- Ferntree Gully Football Club
- Forest Hill Football Club
- Heathmont Football Club
- Kilsyth Football Club
- Knox Football Club
- Lilydale Football Club
- Mitcham Football Club
- Montrose Football Club
- Mooroolbark Football Club
- Mulgrave Football Club
- Noble Park Football Club
- North Ringwood Football Club
- Norwood Football Club
- Nunawading Football Club
- Park Orchards Football Club
- Ringwood Football Club
- Rowville Football Club
- Scoresby Football Club
- Silvan Football Club
- South Belgrave Football Club
- South Croydon Football Club
- Surrey Park Football Club
- Templestowe Football Club
- The Basin Football Club
- Upper Ferntree Gully Football Club
- Vermont Football Club
- Wantirna South Football Club
- Warrandyte Football Club
- Waverley Blues Football Club
- Whitehorse Pioneers Football Club

==== Essendon District Football League ====
- Aberfeldie Football Club
- Airport West Football Club
- Avondale Heights Football Club
- Burnside Heights Football Club
- Coburg Districts Football Club
- Craigieburn Football Club
- Doutta Stars Football Club
- East Keilor Football Club
- Glenroy Football Club
- Greenvale Football Club
- Hadfield Football Club
- Hillside Football Club
- Jacana Football Club
- Keilor Football Club
- Maribyrnong Park Football Club
- Moonee Valley Football Club
- Northern Saints Football Club
- Oak Park Football Club
- Pascoe Vale Football Club
- Roxburgh Park Football Club
- Strathmore Football Club
- Taylors Lakes Football Club
- Tullamarine Football Club
- West Coburg Football Club
- Westmeadows Football Club

==== Northern Football League ====
- Banyule Football Club
- Bundoora Football Club
- Eltham Football Club
- Epping Football Club
- Diamond Creek Football Club
- Fitzroy Stars Football Club
- Greensborough Football Club
- Heidelberg Football Club
- Heidelberg West Football Club
- Hurstbridge Football Club
- Kilmore Football Club
- Lalor Football Club
- Laurimar Football Club
- Lower Plenty Football Club
- Macleod Football Club
- Mernda Football Club
- Montmorency Football Club
- North Heidelberg Football Club
- Northcote Park Football Club
- Panton Hill Football Club
- Reservoir Football Club
- St Mary's Senior Football Club
- South Morang Football Club
- Thomastown Football Club
- Watsonia Football Club
- West Preston Lakeside Football Club
- Whittlesea Football Club

==== Southern Football League ====
- Ashwood Football Club
- Bentleigh Football Club
- Black Rock Football Club
- Carrum Patterson Lakes Football Club
- Caulfield Football Club
- Cerberus Football Club
- Chelsea Heights Football Club
- Cheltenham Football Club
- Clayton Football Club
- Dandenong Demons Football Club
- Dingley Football Club
- Doveton Eagles Football Club
- East Brighton Football Club
- East Malvern Football Club
- Endeavour Hills Football Club
- Frankston Dolphins Football Club
- Hallam Football Club
- Hampton Football Club
- Hampton Park Football Club
- Heatherton Football Club
- Highett Football Club
- Keysborough Football Club
- Lyndale Football Club
- Lyndhurst Football Club
- Moorabbin Kangaroos Football Club
- Mordialloc Football Club
- Mount Waverley Football Club
- Murrumbeena Football Club
- Oakleigh District Football Club
- Port Colts Football Club
- St Kilda City Football Club
- St Pauls-East Bentleigh Football Club
- Sandown Cobras Football Club
- Skye Football Club
- South Yarra Football Club
- Springvale District Football Club

==== Victorian Amateur Football Association ====
- AJAX Football Club
- Albert Park Football Club
- Aquinas Old Collegians
- Beaumaris Football Club
- Box Hill North Football Club
- Brunswick Football Club
- Bulleen-Templestowe Football Club
- Canterbury Football Club
- Caulfield Grammarians Football Club
- Collegians Football Club
- De La Salle Old Collegians
- Eley Park Football Club
- Elsternwick Football Club
- Eltham Old Collegians
- Emmaus St Leo's Old Collegians Football Club
- Fitzroy Football Club
- Glen Eira Amateur Football Club
- Hampton Rovers Football Club
- Hawthorn Amateur Football Club
- Ivanhoe Assumption Football Club
- Kew Football Club
- La Trobe University Football Club
- Manningham Amateur Football Club
- Marcellin Old Collegians
- Masala Football Club
- Mazenod Old Collegians
- Melbourne High School Old Boys
- Monash Blues
- Mount Lilydale Football Club
- North Brunswick Football Club
- Oakleigh Amateur Football Club
- Old Brighton Grammarians
- Old Camberwell Grammarians
- Old Carey Grammarians
- Old Geelong
- Old Haileyburians
- Old Ivanhoe Grammarians
- Old Melburnians
- Old Mentonians
- Old Paradians
- Old Scotch
- Old Trinity Grammarians
- Old Westbourne
- Ormond Amateur Football Club
- Parkdale Vultures
- Parkside Football Club
- PEGS
- Peninsula Old Boys
- Powerhouse Football Club
- Prahran Football Club
- Preston Amateurs Football Club
- Richmond Central Football Club
- St Bedes/Mentone Tigers Football Club
- St Bernards Old Collegians
- St Francis Xavier
- St Johns Old Collegians
- St Kevins Old Boys
- St Mary's/Salesian Football Club
- South Melbourne Districts Football Club
- South Mornington Football Club
- Swinburne Football Club
- Therry Penola Old Boys
- University Blacks
- University Blues
- University High School-Victoria University Football Club
- West Brunswick Football Club
- Whitefriars Old Collegians
- Williamstown CYMS
- Old Xaverians
- Yarra Valley Old Boys

==== Western Region Football League ====
- Albanvale Football Club
- Albion Football Club
- Altona Football Club
- Braybrook Football Club
- Caroline Springs Football Club
- Glen Orden Football Club
- Hoppers Crossing Football Club
- Laverton Magpies Football Club
- Manor Lakes Football Club
- Newport Power Football Club
- North Footscray Football Club
- North Sunshine Football Club
- Parkside Football Club
- Point Cook Football Club
- Point Cook Centrals Football Club
- Spotswood Football Club
- Sunshine Football Club
- Sunshine Heights Football Club
- Tarneit Football Club
- Werribee Districts Football Club
- West Footscray Football Club
- Suns Football Club
- Wyndhamvale Football Club
- Yarraville Seddon Football Club

==== Eastern Region Girls Football League ====
- Bayswater Junior Football Club
- Belgrave Football Netball Club
- Blackburn Junior Football Club
- Chirnside Park Football Club
- Coldstream Football Club
- Croydon Football Club
- Donvale Football Club
- East Burwood Football Club
- East Ringwood Football Club
- Emerald Football Club
- Ferntree Gully Football Club
- Forest Hill Football Club
- Gembrook-Cockatoo Football Club
- Glen Waverly Football Club
- Healesville Football Club
- Heathmont Football Club
- Kilsyth Football Club
- Knox Football Club
- Lilydale Football Club
- Mitcham Football Club
- Monbulk Junior Football Club
- Montrose Football Club
- Mooroolbark Football Club
- Mount Everlyn Football Club
- North Ringwood Football Club
- Norwood Football Club
- Olinda Ferny Creek Football Club Inc.
- Rowville Hawks Football Club
- Rowville Knights Community Football Club
- South Belgrave / Lysterfield Junior Football Club
- The Basin Football Club
- Upper Ferntree Gully Football Club
- Upwey-Tecoma Junior Football Club
- Vermont football Club
- Wandin Football Netball Club
- Waverley Blues Football Club
- Yarra Glen Football Netball Club
- Yarra Junction Football Club

=== Vic Country (VCFL) ===
==== Alberton Football League ====
- Fish Creek Football Club
- Foster Football Club
- Meeniyan Dumbalk United Football Club
- Stony Creek Football Club
- Tarwin Football Club
- Toora & District Football Club

==== Ballarat Football League ====
- Bacchus Marsh Football Club
- Ballarat Football Club
- Darley Football Club
- East Point Football Club
- Lake Wendouree Football Club
- Melton Football Club
- Melton South Football Club
- North Ballarat City Football Club
- Redan Football Club
- Sebastopol Football Club
- Sunbury Football Club

==== Bellarine Football League ====
- Anglesea Football Club
- Barwon Heads Football Club
- Drysdale Football Club
- Geelong Amateur Football Club
- Modewarre Football Club
- Newcomb Power Football Club
- Ocean Grove Football Club
- Portarlington Football Club
- Queenscliff Football Club
- Torquay Football Club

==== Bendigo Football League ====
- Castlemaine Football Club
- Eaglehawk Football Club
- Gisborne Football Club
- Golden Square Football Club
- Kangaroo Flat Football Club
- Kyneton Football Club
- Maryborough Football Club
- Sandhurst Football Club
- South Bendigo Football Club
- Strathfieldsaye Football Club

==== Central Highlands Football League ====
- Ballan Football Club
- Beaufort Football Club
- Bungaree Football Club
- Buninyong Football Club
- Carngham Linton Football Club
- Clunes Football Club
- Creswick Football Club
- Daylesford Football Club
- Dunnstown Football Club
- Gordon Football Club
- Hepburn Football Club
- Learmonth Football Club
- Newlyn Football Club
- Rokewood Corindhap Football Club
- Skipton Football Club
- Springbank Football Club
- Waubra Football Club

==== Central Murray Football League ====
- Balranald Football Club
- Cohuna Kangas Football Club
- Kerang Football Club
- Koondrook Barham Football Club
- Lake Boga Football Club
- Mallee Eagles Football Club
- Nyah Nyah West United Football Club
- Swan Hill Football Club
- Tooleybuc Manangatang Football Club
- Tyntynder Football Club
- Woorinen Football Club

==== Colac & District Football League ====
- Alvie Football Club
- Apollo Bay Football Club
- Birregurra Football Club
- Colac Imperials Football Club
- Irrewarra-Beeac Football Club
- Lorne Football Club
- Simpson Football Club
- South Colac Football Club
- Otway Districts Football Club
- Western Eagles Football Club

==== East Gippsland Football League ====
- Boisdale Briagolong Football Club
- Lakes Entrance Football Club
- Lindenow Football Club
- Lucknow Football Club
- Orbost Snowy Rovers Football Club
- Paynesville Football Club
- Stratford Football Club
- Wy Yung Football Club

==== Ellinbank & District Football League ====
- Buln Buln Football Club
- Catani Football Club
- Ellinbank Football Club
- Lang Lang Football Club
- Longwarry Football Club
- Neerim-Neerim South Football Club
- Nilma Darnum Football Club
- Nyora Football Club
- Poowong Football Club
- Warragul Industrials Football Club

==== Geelong Football League ====
- Bell Park Football Club
- Colac Football Club
- Geelong West Giants Football Club
- Grovedale Football Club
- Lara Football Club
- Leopold Football Club
- Newtown & Chilwell Football Club
- North Shore Football Club
- South Barwon Football Club
- St Albans Football Club
- St Mary's Football Club
- St Joseph's Football Club

==== Geelong & District Football League ====
- Anakie Football Club
- Bannockburn Football Club
- Bell Post Hill Football Club
- Belmont Lions Football Club
- Corio Football Club
- East Geelong Football Club
- Geelong West Giants Football Club
- Inverleigh Football Club
- North Geelong Football Club
- Thomson Football Club
- Winchelsea Football Club
- Werribee Centrals Football Club

==== Gippsland Football League ====
- Bairnsdale Football Club
- Drouin Football Club
- Leongatha Football Club
- Maffra Football Club
- Moe Football Club
- Morwell Football Club
- Sale Football Club
- Traralgon Football Club
- Warragul Football Club
- Wonthaggi Power Football Club

==== Golden Rivers Football League ====
- Hay Football Club
- Macorna Football Club
- Moulamein Football Club
- Murrabit Football Club
- Nullawil Football Club
- Quambatook Football Club
- Ultima Football Club
- Wakool Football Club
- Wandella Football Club

==== Goulburn Valley Football League ====
- Benalla Football Club
- Echuca Football Club
- Euroa Football Club
- Kyabram Football Club
- Mansfield Football Club
- Mooroopna Football Club
- Rochester Football Club
- Seymour Football Club
- Shepparton Football Club
- Shepparton Swans Football Club
- Shepparton United Football Club
- Tatura Football Club

==== Hampden Football League ====
- Camperdown Football Club
- Cobden Football Club
- Hamilton Football Club
- Koroit Football Club
- North Warrnambool Football Club
- Port Fairy Football Club
- Portland Football Netball Cricket Club
- South Warrnambool Football Club
- Terang Mortlake Football Club
- Warrnambool Football Club

==== Heathcote District Football League ====
- Colbinabbin Football Club
- Elmore Football Club
- Heathcote Football Club
- Huntly Football Club
- Leitchville Gunbower Football Club
- Lockington Bamawm United Football Club
- Mount Pleasant Football Club
- North Bendigo Football Club
- White Hills Football Club

==== Horsham & District Football League ====
- Edenhope-Apsley Football Club
- Harrow-Balmoral Football Club
- Kalkee Football Club
- Kaniva-Leeor United Football Club
- Laharum Football Club
- Natimuk United Football Club
- Noradjuha-Quantong Football Club
- Pimpinio Football Club
- Rupanyup Football Club
- Stawell Swifts Football Club
- Taylors Lake Football Club

==== Kyabram & District Football League ====
- Ardmona Football Club
- Avenel Football Club
- Dookie United Football Club
- Girgarre Football Club
- Lancaster Football Club
- Longwood Football Club
- Merrigum Football Club
- Murchison Football Club
- Nagambie Football Club
- Rushworth Football Club
- Stanhope Football Club
- Tallygaroopna Football Club
- Undera Football Club
- Violet Town Football Club

==== Loddon Valley Football League ====
- Bears Lagoon-Serpentine Football Club
- Bridgewater Football Club
- Calivil United Football Club
- Inglewood Football Club
- Marong & District Football Club
- Mitiamo Football Club
- Newbridge Football Club
- Pyramid Hill Football Club
- YCW Football Club

==== Maryborough Castlemaine District Football League ====
- Avoca Football Club
- Campbells Creek Football Club
- Carisbrook Football Club
- Dunolly Football Club
- Harcourt Football Club
- Lexton Football Club
- Maldon Football Club
- Maryborough Rovers Football Club
- Natte Bealiba Football Club
- Navarre Football Club
- Newstead Football Club
- Royal Park Football Club
- Talbot Football Club
- Trentham Football Club

==== Mid Gippsland Football League ====
- Boolarra Football Club
- Fish Creek Football Club
- Foster Football Club
- Hill End Football Club
- Mirboo North Football Club
- MDU Football Club
- Morwell East Football Club
- Newborough Football Club
- Stony Creek Football Club
- Tarwin Football Club
- Thorpdale Football Club
- Toora Football Club
- Yinnar Football Club

==== Millewa Football League ====
- Bambill Football Club
- Cardross Football Club
- Gol Gol Football Club
- Meringur Football Club
- Nangiloc Football Club
- Werrimull Football Club

==== Mininera & District Football League ====
- Ararat Eagles Football Club
- Caramut Football Club
- Glenthompson-Dunkeld Football Club
- Great Western Football Club
- Hawkesdale-Macarthur Football Club
- Lismore-Derrinallum Football Club
- Moyston-Willaura Football Club
- Penshurst Football Club
- SMW Rovers Football Club
- Tatyoon Football Club
- Wickliffe-Lake Bolac Football Club
- Woorndoo-Mortlake Football Club

==== Mornington Peninsula Nepean Football League ====
- Bonbeach Football Club
- Chelsea Football Club
- Crib Point Football Club
- Devon Meadows Football Club
- Dromana Football Club
- Edithvale Aspendale Football Club
- Frankston Bombers Football Club
- Frankston YCW Football Club
- Hastings Football Club
- Karingal Football Club
- Langwarrin Football Club
- Mornington Football Club
- Mount Eliza Football Club
- Pearcedale Football Club
- Pines Football Club
- Red Hill Football Club
- Rosebud Football Club
- Rye Football Club
- Seaford Football Club
- Somerville Football Club
- Sorrento Football Club
- Tyabb Football Club

==== Murray Football League ====
- Barooga Football Club
- Cobram Football Club
- Congupna Football Club
- Deniliquin Football Club
- Echuca United Football Club
- Finley Football Club
- Katandra Football Club
- Moama Football Club
- Mulwala Football Club
- Nathalia Football Club
- Numurkah Football Club
- Rumbalara Football Club
- Shepparton East Football Club
- Tongala Football Club
- Tungamah Football Club

==== North Central Football League ====
- Birchip-Watchem Football Club
- Boort Football Club
- Charlton Football Club
- Donald Football Club
- St Arnaud Football Club
- Sea Lake Nandaly Football Club
- Wedderburn Football Club
- Wycheproof-Narraport Football Club

==== North Gippsland Football League ====
- Churchill Football Club
- Cowwarr Football Club
- Glengarry Football Club
- Gormandale Football Club
- Heyfield Football Club
- Rosedale Football Club
- Sale City Football Club
- Traralgon Tyers United Football Club
- Woodside Football Club
- Yarram Football Club

==== Omeo & District Football League ====
- Bruthen Football Club
- Buchan Football Club
- Lindenow South Football Club
- Omeo-Benambra Football Club
- Swan Reach Football Club
- Swifts Creek Football Club

==== Ovens & King Football League ====
- Benalla All Blacks Football Club
- Bonnie Doon Football Club
- Bright Football Club
- Glenrowan Football Club
- Goorambat Football Club
- Greta Football Club
- King Valley Football Club
- Milawa Football Club
- Moyhu Football Club
- North Wangaratta Football Club
- Tarrawingee Football Club
- Whorouly Football Club

==== Ovens & Murray Football League ====
- Albury Football Club
- Corowa Rutherglen Football Club
- Lavington Football Club
- Myrtleford Football Club
- North Albury Football Club
- Wangaratta Football Club
- Wangaratta Rovers Football Club
- Wodonga Football Club
- Wodonga Raiders Football Club
- Yarrawonga Football Club

==== Picola & District Football League ====
- Berrigan Football Club
- Blighty Football Club
- Deniliquin Rovers Football Club
- Jerilderie Football Club
- Katamatite Football Club
- Katunga Football Club
- Mathoura Football Club
- Picola United Football Club
- Rennie Football Club
- Strathmerton Football Club
- Tocumwal Football Club
- Waaia Football Club
- Yarroweyah Football Club

==== Riddell District Football League ====
- Broadford Football Club
- Diggers Rest Football Club
- Lancefield Football Club
- Macedon Football Club
- Melton Central Football Club
- Riddell Football Club
- Rockbank Football Club
- Romsey Football Club
- Rupertswood Football Club
- Sunbury Kangaroos Football Club
- Wallan Football Club
- Woodend/Hesket Football Club

==== South East Football League ====
- Beaconsfield Football Club
- Berwick Football Club
- Cranbourne Football Club
- Doveton Football Club
- Narre Warren Football Club
- Officer Football Club
- Pakenham Football Club
- Tooradin-Dalmore Football Club

==== South West District Football League ====
- Branxholme-Wallacedale Football Club
- Cavendish Football Club
- Coleraine Football Club
- Dartmoor Football Club
- Heathmere Football Club
- Heywood Football Club
- Tyrendarra Football Club
- Westerns Football Club

==== Sunraysia Football League ====
- Imperials Football Club
- Irymple Football Club
- Merbein Football Club
- Mildura Football Club
- Ouyen United Football Club
- Red Cliffs Football Club
- Robinvale Euston Football Club
- South Mildura Football Club
- Wentworth Football Club

==== Tallangatta & District Football League ====
- Barnawartha Football Club
- Beechworth Football Club
- Chiltern Football Club
- Dederang Mount Beauty Football Club
- Kiewa-Sandy Creek Football Club
- Mitta United Football Club
- Rutherglen Football Club
- Tallangatta Football Club
- Thurgoona Football Club
- Wahgunyah Football Club
- Wodonga Saints Football Club
- Yackandandah Football Club

==== Upper Murray Football League ====
- Border Walwa Football Club
- Bullioh Football Club
- Corryong Football Club
- Cudgewa Football Club
- Federal Football Club
- Tumbarumba Football Club

==== Warrnambool & District Football League ====
- Allansford Football Club
- Dennington Football Club
- East Warrnambool Football Club
- Kolora-Noorat Football Club
- Merrivale Football Club
- Nirranda Football Club
- Old Collegians Football Club
- Panmure Football Club
- Russell's Creek Football Club
- South Rovers Football Club
- Timboon Demons Football Club

==== Wimmera Football League ====
- Ararat Football Club
- Dimboola Football Club
- Horsham Demons Football Club
- Horsham Saints Football Club
- Minyip Murtoa Football Club
- Nhill Football Club
- Southern Mallee Thunder Football Club
- Stawell Football Club
- Warracknabeal Football Club

==== Yarra Valley Mountain District Football League ====
- Alexandra Football Club
- Belgrave Football Club
- Emerald Football Club
- Gembrook-Cockatoo Football Club
- Healesville Football Club
- Kinglake Football Club
- Monbulk Football Club
- Mount Evelyn Football Club
- Olinda-Ferny Creek Football Club
- Powelltown Football Club
- Seville Football Club
- Thornton-Eildon Football Club
- Upwey-Tecoma Football Club
- Wandin Football Club
- Warbuton-Millgrove Football Club
- Woori Yallock Football Club
- Yarra Glen Football Club
- Yarra Junction Football Club
- Yea Football Club

=== Statewide Under 18 ===
==== NAB League ====
- Bendigo Pioneers
- Calder Cannons
- Dandenong Stingrays
- Eastern Ranges
- Geelong Falcons
- Gippsland Power
- Murray Bushrangers
- North Ballarat Rebels
- Northern Knights
- Oakleigh Chargers
- Sandringham Dragons
- Western Jets

== South Australia ==
=== Adelaide Football League ===
- Adelaide Lutheran Football Club
- Adelaide University Football Club
- Athelstone Football Club
- Blackfriars Old Scholars Football Club
- Brahma Lodge Football Club
- Brighton Districts and Old Scholars Football Club
- Broadview Football Club
- Central United Football Club
- Christian Brothers College Old Collegians Football Club
- Colonel Light Gardens Football Club
- Eastern Park Football Club
- Edwardstown Football Club
- Elizabeth Football Club
- Fitzroy Football Club
- Flinders Park Football Club
- Flinders University Football Club
- Gaza Football Club
- Gepps Cross Football Club
- Glenunga Football Club
- Golden Grove Football Club
- Goodwood Saints Football Club
- Greenacres Football Club
- Hectorville Football Club
- Henley Football Club
- Hope Valley Football Club
- Houghton Districts Football Club
- Ingle Farm Football Club
- Kenilworth Football Club
- Kilburn Football Club
- Lockleys Football Club
- Marion Football Club
- Mawson Lakes Football Club
- Mitcham Football Club
- Mitchell Park Football Club
- Modbury Football Club
- Morphettville Park Football Club
- North Haven Football Club
- O'Sullivan Beach-Lonsdale Football Club
- Old Ignatians Football Club
- Para Hills Football Club
- Payneham Norwood Union Football Club
- Pembroke Old Scholars Football Club
- Plympton Football Club
- PHOS Camden Football Club
- Pooraka Football Club
- Port District Football Club
- Portland Football Club
- Prince Alfred Old Collegians Football Club
- Pulteney Football Club
- Rosewater Football Club
- Rostrevor Old Collegians Football Club
- Sacred Heart Old Collegians Football Club
- SMOSH West Lakes Football Club
- St Pauls Old Scholars Football Club
- St Peter's Old Collegians Football Club
- Salisbury Football Club
- Salisbury West Football Club
- Scotch Old Collegians Football Club
- Seaton Ramblers Football Club
- Smithfield Football Club
- Tea Tree Gully Football Club
- Trinity Old Scholars Football Club
- Unley Mercedes Jets Football Club
- Walkerville Football Club
- West Croydon Football Club
- Westminster Old Scholars Football Club
- Woodville South Football Club

=== Adelaide Plains Football League ===
- Angle Vale Football Club
- Balaklava Football Club
- Hamley Bridge Football Club
- Hummocks Watchman Eagles Football Club
- Mallala Football Club
- Two Wells Football Club
- United Football Club
- Virginia Football Club

=== Barossa Light & Gawler Football Association ===
- Angaston Football Club
- Barossa District Football Club
- Freeling Football Club
- Gawler Central Football Club
- Kapunda Football Club
- Nuriootpa Football Club
- South Gawler Football Club
- Tanunda Football Club
- Willaston Football Club

=== Eastern Eyre Football League ===
- Cleve Football Club
- Cowell Football Club
- Eastern Ranges Football Club
- Kimba Districts Football Club

=== Far North Football League ===
- East Roxby Football Club
- Hornridge Football Club
- Olympic Dam Football Club
- Roxby Districts Football Club

=== Far West Football League ===
- Blues Football Club
- Koonibba Football Club
- Thevenard Football Club
- Western United Football Club

=== Great Flinders Football League ===
- Cummins Kapinnie Football Club
- Eyre United Football Club
- Lock Football Club
- Ramblers Football Club
- Tumby Bay Football Club
- United Yeelanna Football Club

=== Great Southern Football League ===
- Encounter Bay Football Club
- Goolwa-Port Elliot Football Club
- Langhorne Creek Football Club
- McLaren Football Club
- Mount Compass Football Club
- Myponga-Sellicks Football Club
- Strathalbyn Football Club
- Victor Harbor Football Club
- Willunga Football Club
- Yankalilla Football Club

=== Hills Football League ===
- Birdwood Football Club
- Blackwood Football Club
- Bridgewater-Callington Football Club
- Echunga Football Club
- Gumeracha Football Club
- Hahndorf Football Club
- Ironbank-Cherry Gardens Football Club
- Kangarilla Football Club
- Kersbrook Football Club
- Lobethal Football Club
- Macclesfield Football Club
- Meadows Football Club
- Mount Barker Football Club
- Mount Lofty District Football Club
- Nairne Bremer United Football Club
- Onkaparinga Valley Football Club
- Torrens Valley Football Club
- Uraidla Districts Football Club

=== Kangaroo Island Football League ===
- Dudley United Football Club
- Kingscote Football Club
- Parndana Football Club
- Western Districts Football Club
- Wisanger Football Club

=== Kowree-Naracoorte-Tatiara Football League ===
- Border Districts Football Club
- Bordertown Football Club
- Keith Football Club
- Kingston Football Club
- Kybybolite Football Club
- Lucindale Football Club
- Mundulla Football Club
- Naracoorte Football Club
- Padthaway Football Club
- Penola Football Club

=== Mallee Football League ===
- Border Downs Tintinara Football Club
- Karoonda Football Club
- Lameroo Football Club
- Murrayville Football Club
- Peake & District Football Club
- Pinnaroo Football Club

=== Mid South Eastern Football League ===
- Glencoe Football Club
- Hatherleigh Football Club
- Kalangadoo Football Club
- Kongorong Football Club
- Mount Burr Football Club
- Nangwarry Football Club
- Port MacDonnell Football Club
- Robe Football Club
- Tantanoola Football Club

=== Mid West Football League ===
- Central Eyre Football Club
- Elliston Football Club
- West Coast Hawks Football Club
- Western Districts Football Club
- Wirrulla Football Club
- Wudinna Football Club

=== North Eastern Football League ===
- Blyth Snowtown Football Club
- Brinkworth Spalding Redhill Football Club
- Burra Booborowie Hallett Football Club
- Eudunda-Robertstown Football Club
- Mintaro Manoora Football Club
- North Clare Football Club
- Riverton Saddleworth Marrabel United Football Club
- South Clare Football Club

=== Northern Areas Football Association ===
- Booleroo Melrose Wilmington Football Club
- Broughton Mundoora Football Club
- Crystal Brook Football Club
- Jamestown Peterborough Football Club
- Orroroo Football Club
- Southern Flinders Football Club

=== Port Lincoln Football League ===
- Boston Football Club
- Lincoln South Football Club
- Mallee Park Football Club
- Marble Range Football Club
- Tasman Football Club
- Wayback Football Club

=== Riverland Football League ===
- Barmera-Monash Football Club
- Berri Football Club
- Blanchetown-Swan Reach Football Club
- Browns Well Football Club
- Cobdogla Football Club
- Loxton Football Club
- Loxton North Football Club
- Lyrup Football Club
- Paringa Football Club
- Ramco Football Club
- Renmark Football Club
- Sedan Cambrai Football Club
- Waikerie Football Club
- Wunkar Football Club

=== River Murray Football League ===
- Imperial Football Club
- Jervois Football Club
- Mannum Football Club
- Meningie Football Club
- Mypolonga Football Club
- Rambler Football Club
- Tailem Bend Football Club

=== Southern Football League ===
- Aldinga Football Club
- Christies Beach Football Club
- Cove Football Club
- Flagstaff Hill Football Club
- Happy Valley Football Club
- Morphett Vale Football Club
- Noarlunga Football Club
- Port Noarlunga Football Club
- Reynella Football Club

=== Spencer Gulf Football League ===
- Central Augusta Football Club
- Lions Football Club
- Port Football Club
- Solomontown Football Club
- South Augusta Football Club
- West Augusta Football Club

=== Western Border Football League ===
- Casterton Sandford Football Club
- East Gambier Football Club
- Millicent Football Club
- North Gambier Football Club
- South Gambier Football Club
- West Gambier Football Club

=== Whyalla Football League ===
- Central Whyalla Football Club
- North Whyalla Football Club
- Roopeena Football Club
- South Whyalla Football Club
- Weeroona Bay Football Club
- West Whyalla Football Club

=== Yorke Peninsula Football League ===
- Ardrossan Football Club
- Bute Football Club
- Central Yorke Cougars Football Club
- CMS Crows Football Club
- Kadina Football Club
- Moonta Football Club
- Paskeville Football Club
- Southern Eagles Football Club
- Wallaroo Football Club

== Western Australia ==
=== Western Australian Amateur Football League ===
- Armadale Football Club
- Ballajura Football Club
- Bassendean Football Club
- Bayswater Football Club
- Belmont Districts Football Club
- Brentwood Booragoon Football Club
- Bull Creek Leeming Football Club
- Canning Vale Football Club
- Canning Vic Park South Perth Football Club
- Carlisle Football Club
- Cockburn Football Club
- Cockburn Lakes Football Club
- Collegians Football Club
- Coolbellup Football Club
- Coolbinia West Perth Football Club
- Cottesloe Football Club
- Dianella Morley Football Club
- Ellenbrook Football Club
- Fremantle CBC Football Club
- Forrestdale Football Club
- Gosnells Football Club
- Hamersley Carine Football Club
- High Wycombe Football Club
- Jandakot Football Club
- Kalamunda Football Club
- Kenwick Football Club
- Kingsley Football Club
- Kingsway Football Club
- Kwinana Football Club
- Lynwood Ferndale Football Club
- Maddington Football Club
- Manning Football Club
- Melville Football Club
- Mosman Park Football Club
- Mount Lawley Football Club
- Nollamara Football Club
- North Beach Football Club
- North Fremantle Football Club
- Ocean Ridge Football Club
- Osborne Park Football Club
- Piara Waters Football Club
- Quinns District Football Club
- Rossmoyne Football Club
- St Norbets Football Club
- Scarborough Football Club
- Secret Harbour Football Club
- Stirling Football Club
- Swan Athletic Football Club
- Swan Valley Football Club
- Thornlie Football Club
- Trinity Aquinas Football Club
- University Football Club
- Wanneroo Football Club
- Warnbro Football Club
- Wembley Football Club
- Wesley Curtin Football Club
- West Coast Cowan Football Club
- Whitford Football Club
- Willetton Football Club
- Yanchep Football Club

=== Avon Football Association ===
- Beverley Football Club
- Cunderdin Football Club
- Federals Football Club
- Kellerberrin/Tammin Football Club
- Quairading Football Club
- Railways Football Club
- York Football Club

=== Central Kimberley Football League ===
- Bayulu Bulldogs Football Club
- Mowanjum Hawks Football Club
- Muludja Lions Football Club
- Noonkanbah Blues Football Club
- Wangkatjungka Crows Football Club

=== Central Midlands Coastal Football League ===
- Dandaragan Football Club
- Cervantes Football Club
- Jurien Bay Football Club
- Lancelin Football Club
- Moora Football Club

=== Central Wheatbelt Football League ===
- Beacon Football Club
- Bencubbin Football Club
- Kalannie Football Club
- Koorda Football Club
- Mukinbudin Football Club
- Nungarin Football Club

=== Eastern Districts Football League ===
- Bruce Rock Football Club
- Burracoppin Football Club
- Corrigin Football Club
- Hyden/Karlgarin Football Club
- Kulin/Kondinin Football Club
- Narembeen Football Club
- Nukarni Football Club
- Southern Cross Football Club

=== East Kimberley Football Association ===
- Bow River Football Club
- Halls Creek Football Club
- Kundat Djaru Football Club
- Kununurra Football Club
- Kururrungku Football Club
- Ord River Football Club
- Waringarri Football Club
- Warmun Football Club
- Wyndham Football Club
- Yardgee Football Club

=== Esperance District Football Association ===
- Esperance Football Club
- Gibson Football Club
- Newtown Condingup Football Club
- Ports Football Club

=== Fortescue National Football League ===
- Panthers Football Club
- Saints Football Club
- Tigers Football Club
- Towns Football Club

=== Gascoyne Football Association ===
- Exmouth Football Club
- Gascoyne Football Club
- Ramblers Football Club
- Warriors Football Club

=== Goldfields Football League ===
- Boulder City Football Club
- Kalgoorlie City Football Club
- Kambalda Football Club
- Mines Rovers Football Club
- Railways Football Club

=== Great Northern Football League ===
- Brigades Football Club
- Chapman Valley Football Club
- Mullewa Football Club
- Northampton Football Club
- Railway Football Club
- Rovers Football Club
- Towns Football Club

=== Great Southern Football League ===
- Albany Football Club
- Denmark Walpole Football Club
- Mount Barker Football Club
- North Albany Football Club
- Railways Football Club
- Royals Football Club

=== Hills Football Association ===
- Bullsbrook Football Club
- Chidlow Football Club
- Gidgegannup Football Club
- Mount Helena Football Club
- Mundaring Football Club
- Parkerville Football Club
- Pickering Brook Football Club

=== Lower South West Football League ===
- Boyup Brook Football Club
- Bridgetown Football Club
- Deanmill Football Club
- Imperials Football Club
- Kojonup Football Club
- Southerners Football Club
- Tigers Football Club

=== Mortlock Football League ===
- Calingiri Football Club
- Dalwallinu Football Club
- Dowerin Wyalkatchem Football Club
- Gingin Football Club
- Goomalling Football Club
- Toodyay Football Club
- Wongan Ballidu Football Club

=== Newman National Football League ===
- Centrals Football Club
- Pioneers Football Club
- Saints Football Club
- Tigers Football Club

=== North Midlands Football League ===
- Carnamah-Perenjori Football Club
- Coorow-Latham Football Club
- Dongara Football Club
- Mingenew Football Club
- Morawa Football Club
- Three Springs Football Club

=== North Pilbara Football League ===
- Dampier Sharks Football Club
- Karratha Falcons Football Club
- Karratha Kats Football Club
- Port Hedland Rovers Football Club
- South Hedland Swans Football Club
- Wickham Wolves Football Club

=== Ongerup Football Association ===
- Boxwood Hills Football Club
- Gnowangerup Football Club
- Jerramungup Football Club
- Lake Grace/Pingrup Football Club
- Newdegate Football Club

=== Ravensthorpe & District Football Association ===
- Ravensthorpe Tigers Football Club
- Southerners Football Club
- Lakes Football Club

=== Peel Football League ===
- Baldivis Football Club
- Centrals Football Club
- Halls Head Football Club
- Mandurah Football Club
- Pinjarra Football Club
- Rockingham Football Club
- South Mandurah Football Club
- Waroona Football Club

=== South West Football League ===
- Augusta Margaret River Football Club
- Bunbury Football Club
- Busselton Football Club
- Carey Park Football Club
- Collie Eagles Football Club
- Donnybrook Football Club
- Eaton Boomers Football Club
- Harvey Brunswick Lesch Football Club
- Harvey Bulls Football Club
- South Bunbury Football Club

=== Upper Great Southern Football League ===
- Boddington Football Club
- Brookton/Pingelly Football Club
- Katanning Wanderers Football Club
- Kukerin/Dumbleyung Football Club
- Narrogin Hawks Football Club
- Wagin Football Club
- Wickepin Football Club
- Williams Football Club

=== West Kimberley Football Association ===
- Towns Football Club
- Broome Bulls Football Club
- Broome Saints Football Club
- Peninsula Bombers Football Club
- Bidyadanga Football Club
- Cable Beach Football Club
- Derby Tigers Football Club
- Looma Eagles Football Club

== Tasmania ==
=== North West Football League ===
- Burnie Football Club
- Devonport Football Club
- East Devonport Football Club
- Latrobe Football Club
- Penguin Football Club
- Smithton Football Club
- Ulverstone Football Club
- Wynyard Football Club

=== Southern Football League ===
- Brighton Robins
- Claremont Magpies
- Cygnet Football Club
- Dodges Ferry Sharks
- East Coast Bombers
- Huonville Lions
- Hobart Tigers
- Lindisfarne Blues
- New Norfolk Eagles
- Sorell Eagles

=== Northern Tasmanian Football Association ===
- Bracknell Football Club
- Bridgenorth Football Club
- Bridport Swans Football Club
- Deloraine Football Club
- East Coast Swans Football Club
- Evandale Football Club
- George Town Football Club
- Hillwood Football Club
- Lilydale Football Club
- Longford Football Club
- Meander Valley Football Club
- Old Launcestonians Football Club
- Old Scotch Football Club
- Perth Football Club
- Rocherlea Football Club
- St. Pat's Football Club
- Scottsdale Football Club
- South Launceston Football Club
- Tamar Cats Football Club
- Uni-Mowbray Football Club

=== Circular Head Football Association ===
- Forest-Stanley Football Club
- Irishtown Football Club
- Redpa Football Club
- Scotchtown Football Club

=== Darwin Football Association ===
- Cuprona Football Club
- Natone Football Club
- Queenstown Football Club
- Ridgley Football Club
- Somerset Football Club
- South Burnie Football Club
- Yeoman Football Club
- Yolla Football Club

=== King Island Football Association ===
- Currie Football Club
- Grassy Football Club
- North Football Club

=== North Western Football Association ===
- Forth Football Club
- Motton-Preston Football Club
- Rosebery-Toorak Football Club
- Sheffield Football Club
- Spreyton Football Club
- Turners Beach Football Club
- Wesley Vale Football Club
- West Ulverstone Football Club
- East Ulverstone Football Club

=== Oatlands District Football Association ===
- Bothwell Football Club
- Campania Football Club
- Campbell Town Football Club
- Mount Pleasant Football Club
- Oatlands Football Club
- Swansea Football Club
- Woodsdale Football Club

=== Old Scholars Football Association ===
- DOSA Football Club
- Hutchins Football Club
- OHA Football Club
- Richmond Football Club
- St. Virgils Football Club
- University Football Club

== New South Wales ==
=== Sydney AFL ===
- Balmain Australian Football Club
- Camden Football Club
- Campbelltown Football Club
- East Coast Eagles
- Holroyd-Parramatta Football Club
- Macquarie University Football Club
- Manly-Warringah Football Club
- Newtown Breakaways Football Club
- Nor-West Football Club
- North West Sydney Redbacks Football Club
- North Shore Australian Football Club
- Pennant Hills Football Club
- Penrith Football Club
- Randwick City Saints Football Club
- St George Football Club
- South West Sydney Football Club
- Southern Power Football Club
- Sydney University Australian National Football Club
- UNSW-Eastern Suburbs Bulldogs
- UTS Australian Football Club
- Western Magic Football Club
- Western Suburbs Football Club
- Wollondilly Knights Football Club
- Wollongong Saints Football Club

=== Black Diamond AFL ===
- Cardiff Football Club
- Gosford Football Club
- Killarney Vale Football Club
- Lake Macquarie Football Club
- Maitland Football Club
- Muswellbrook Football Club
- Nelson Bay Football Club
- Newcastle City Football Club
- Singleton Football Club
- Terrigal Avoca Football Club
- The Entrance Bateau Bay Football Club
- Wallsend-West Newcastle Football Club
- Warners Bay Football Club
- Wyong Lakes Football Club

=== Broken Hill Football League ===
- Central Magpies Football Club
- North Bulldogs Football Club
- South Roos Football Club
- West Robins Football Club

=== Central West Australian Football League ===
- Bathurst Bushrangers Football Club
- Bathurst Giants Football Club
- Dubbo Demons Football Club
- Orange Tigers Football Club
- Parkes Panthers Football Club

=== Farrer Football League ===
- Barellan United Football Club
- CSU Football Club
- Coleambally Football Club
- East Wagga Kooringal Football Club
- Marrar Football Club
- Northern Jets Football Club
- North Wagga Football Club
- Temora Football Club
- The Rock-Yerong Creek Football Club

=== Hume Football League ===
- Billabong Crows Football Club
- Brock/Burrum Saints Football Club
- CDHBU Football Club
- Culcairn Football Club
- Henty Football Club
- Holbrook Football Club
- Howlong Football Club
- Jindera Football Club
- Lockhart Football Club
- Murray Magpies Football Club
- Osborne Football Club
- Rand-Walbundrie-Walla Football Club

=== North Coast Australian Football League ===
- Coffs Breakers Football Club
- Grafton Football Club
- Port Macquarie Football Club
- Sawtell Toormina Football Club

=== North West Australian Football League ===
- Gunnedah District Bulldogs Football Club
- Inverell Saints Football Club
- Moree Suns Football Club
- Narrabri Eagles Football Club
- New England Nomads Football Club
- Tamworth Kangaroos Football Club
- Tamworth Swans Football Club

=== Northern Riverina Football League ===
- Condobolin Milby Football Club
- Hillston Football Club
- Lake Cargelligo Football Club
- Tullibigeal Football Club
- Ungarie Football Club
- West Wyalong Girral Football Club

=== Riverina Football League ===
- Collingullie Glenfield Park Football Club
- Coolamon Football Netball Club
- Ganmain Grong Grong Matong Football Club
- Griffith Football Club
- Leeton/Whitton Football Club
- Mangoplah Cookadinia United Eastlakes Football Club
- Narrandera Football Club
- Turvey Park Football Club
- Wagga Tigers Football Club

=== Sapphire Coast Australian Football League ===
- Eden Football Club
- Merimbula Football Club
- Narooma Football Club
- Pambula Football Club
- Tathra Football Club

=== South Coast Australian Football League ===
- Bomaderry Football Club
- Dapto City Stallions Football Club
- Figtree Kangaroos Football Club
- Kiama Football Club
- Northern Districts Tigers Football Club
- Nowra Albatross Football Club
- Port Kembla Football Club
- Shellharbour City Suns Football Club
- Ulladulla Dockers Football Club
- Wollongong Bulldogs Football Club
- Wollongong Lions Football Club

== Australian Capital Territory ==
=== AFL Canberra ===
- Ainslie Football Club
- ADFA Football Club
- ANU Football Club
- Belconnen Magpies Football Club
- Cootamundra Football Club
- Eastlake Football Club
- Googong Hogs Football Club
- Goulburn City Swans Football Club
- Gungahlin Football Club
- Molonglo Football Club
- Queanbeyan Football Club
- Southern Cats Football Club
- Tuggeranong Hawks Football Club
- Woden Blues Football Club
- Yass Football Club

== Queensland ==
=== Queensland Australian Football League ===
Colours	Club Name	Founded	Main Ground	Location
	Aspley Hornets	1964	Graham Road Oval	Aspley, Brisbane, Queensland
	Broadbeach Cats	1971	Kombumerri Park	Broadbeach, Gold Coast, Queensland
	Coorparoo Blues/Kings	1996	Giffin Park	Coorparoo, Brisbane, Queensland
	Labrador Tigers	1964	Cooke-Murphy Oval	Labrador, Gold Coast, Queensland
	Maroochydore Roos	1970	Maroochydore Multi Sports Complex	Maroochydore, Sunshine Coast, Queensland
	Morningside Panthers	1947	Graham Road Oval	Aspley, Brisbane, Queensland
	Mount Gravatt Vultures	1964	Graham Road Oval	Aspley, Brisbane, Queensland
	Noosa Tigers	1970	Noosa Oval	Noosa, Sunshine Coast, Queensland
	Palm Beach Currumbin	1961	Salk Oval	Palm Beach, Gold Coast, Queensland
	Redland-Victoria Point Sharks	1966	Totally Workwear Park	Redland-Victoria Point, Redland, Queensland
	Sherwood Magpies	1947	Powenyenna Oval	Chelmer, Brisbane, Queensland
	Surfers Paradise Demons	1962	Sir Bruce Small Park	Labrador, Gold Coast, Queensland
	Wilston Grange Gorillas	1945	Hickey Park	Stafford, Brisbane, Queensland

=== Queensland Football Association ===
==== Divisional Football ====
- Alexandra Hills Australian Football Club
- Aspley Football Club
- Beenleigh Australian Football Club
- Bond University Australian Football Club
- Bribie Island Australian Football Club
- Burleigh Bombers Australian Football Club
- Caloundra Australian Football Club
- Carrara Australian Football Club
- Coolangatta Tweed Heads Australian Football Club
- Coomera Australian Football Club
- Coorparoo Football Club (1996)
- Ferny Grove Australian Football Club
- Griffith Uni Moorooka Football Club
- Hinterland Blues Australian Football Club
- Ipswich Cats Australian Football Club
- Ipswich Eagles Australian Football Club
- Jindalee Australian Football Club
- Kedron Football Club
- Kenmore Australian Football Club
- Marcellin Old Collegians Australian Football Club
- Maroochydore Football Club
- Mayne Australian Football Club
- Moreton Bay Australian Football Club
- Noosa Tigers Australian Football Club
- Park Ridge Australian Football Club
- Pine Rivers Swans Australian Football Club
- Redcliffe Tigers Australian Football Club
- Robina Roos Football Club
- Sandgate Football Club
- Springwood Australian Football Club
- University of Queensland Australian Football Club
- Victoria Point Australian Football Club
- Wynnum Football Club
- Yeronga South Brisbane Devils

==== Wide Bay Division ====
- Across the Waves Australian Football Club
- Brothers Bulldogs Australian Football Club
- Gympie Australian Football Club
- Hervey Bay Bombers Australian Football Club
- Hervey Bay Power Australian Football Club
- Maryborough Australian Football Club
- Fraser Coast Cubs Australian Football Club
- Burrum Joey’s Australian Football Club

==== Northern Rivers Division ====
- Ballina Bombers Australian Football Club
- Byron Magpies Australian Football Club
- Lismore Swans Australian Football Club
- Tweed Coast Tigers Australian Football Club

=== AFL Cairns ===
- Cairns City Lions Australian Football Club
- Cairns Saints Australian Football Club
- Centrals Trinity Beach Australian Football Club
- Manunda Hawks Australian Football Club
- North Cairns Australian Football Club
- Port Douglas Australian Football Club
- South Cairns Australian Football Club

=== AFL Capricornia ===
- Boyne Island Tannum Sands Saints
- Brothers Rockhampton Roos
- Gladstone Mudcrabs
- Glenmore Bulls
- Rockhampton Panthers
- Yeppoon Swans

=== AFL Darling Downs ===
- Chinchilla Suns
- Dalby Swans
- Coolaroo Roos
- Goondiwindi Hawks
- Highfields Lions
- South Burnett Saints
- South Toowoomba Bombers
- Toowoomba Tigers
- University Cougars
- Warwick Redbacks

=== AFL Mackay ===
- Eastern Swans
- Mackay Magpies
- Mackay City
- North Mackay
- Whitsunday Sea Eagles
- Bakers Creek Tigers

=== AFL Mount Isa ===
- Buffaloes
- Dajarra Rhinos
- Lake Nash Young Guns
- Rovers
- Tigers

=== AFL Townsville ===
- Curra Swans
- Hermit Park Tigers
- Northern Beaches Lions
- Thuringowa Bulldogs
- University Hawks

== Northern Territory ==
=== Barkly Australian Football League ===
- Barkly Work Camp Football Club
- Canteen Creek Football Club
- Eagles Football Club
- Elliot Football Club
- Sporties Spitfires Football Club

=== Central Australian Football League ===
- Areyonga Football Club
- Federals Football Club
- Laramba Football Club (Cowboys)
- Ltyentye Apurte Football Club
- MacDonnell Districts Football Club
- Mulga Bore Football Club
- Nyirripi Football Club
- Pioneers Football Club
- Plenty Highway Football Club
- Rovers Football Club
- South Football Club
- Ti Tree Football Club
- Titjikala Football Club
- Western Aranda Football Club
- Wests Football Club
- Yuendumu Football Club

=== Gove Australian Football League ===
- Baywarra Football Club
- Djarrak Football Club
- Gopu Football Club
- Nguykal Football Club

=== Big Rivers Australian Football League ===
- Beswick Football Club
- Eastside Football Club
- Kalano Football Club
- Katherine Camels Football Club
- Katherine South Football Club
- Tindal Magpies Football Club

=== Tiwi Islands Football League ===
- Imalu Football Club
- Muluwurri Football Club
- Pumarali Football Club
- Ranku Football Club
- Tapalinga Football Club
- Tuyu Football Club
- Walama Football Club

== See also ==
- List of cricket clubs in Australia
- List of baseball teams in Australia
- List of basketball clubs in Australia
- List of rowing clubs in Australia
- List of rugby league clubs in Australia
- List of rugby union clubs in Australia
- List of soccer clubs in Australia
- List of yacht clubs in Australia
