= 2024 in Australian rules football in Victoria =

2024 Victorian football season
- Date: 22 March – 27 September 2024
- Highest score: M: 54.23 (347); Sandhurst (Bendigo FNL)

The 2024 Victorian football season was the 155th senior season of Australian rules football in Victoria. A total of 920 clubs (including more than 8,700 teams) competed across 85 leagues. All leagues were affiliated with AFL Victoria, with the exception of the Picola & District Football Netball League (PDFNL).

== Clubs ==
=== Mergers ===
The following clubs were established through mergers ahead of the 2024 season:

Original clubs	New club	League	Founded	Ref
Maryborough Rovers	Maryborough Giants	Maryborough Castlemaine District	26 June 2023	
Royal Park	Maryborough Giants	Maryborough Castlemaine District	26 June 2023	
Balwyn Greythorn	Balwyn	Yarra Junior	5 October 2023	
Boroondara Hawks	Balwyn	Yarra Junior	5 October 2023	
Southern Mallee Giants	Southern Mallee Thunder	Wimmera	27 October 2023	
Jeparit-Rainbow	Southern Mallee Thunder	Wimmera	27 October 2023	

== Premiers ==
=== Men's ===
League	Division	Premiers		Runners-up		Ref
League	Division	Club	Score	Club	Score	Ref
Ballarat		Melton	11.6 (72)	East Point	7.13 (55)	
Bellarine		Torquay	16.17 (113)	Anglesea	7.9 (51)	
Bendigo		Sandhurst	10.8 (68)	Gisborne	10.4 (64)	
Central Highlands		Daylesford	7.8 (50)	Bungaree	3.5 (23)	
Central Murray		Nyah Nyah West United	15.16 (106)	Kerang	7.10 (52)	
Colac & District		Lorne	7.8 (50)	Irrewarra-Beeac	4.8 (32)	
East Gippsland		Boisdale Briagolong	15.17 (108)	Lucknow	11.9 (75)	
Eastern	Premier	Balwyn	7.11 (53)	East Ringwood	7.9 (51)	
Eastern	Division 1	Mitcham	8.7 (55)	Park Orchards	2.3 (15)	
Eastern	Division 2	Boronia	13.14 (92)	Croydon	4.5 (29)	
Eastern	Division 3	Surrey Park	12.12 (84)	Donvale	12.10 (82)	
Eastern	Division 4	Scoresby	16.13 (109)	Whitehorse Pioneers	3.10 (28)	
Ellinbank & District		Buln Buln	8.6 (54)	Ellinbank	2.10 (22)	
Essendon District	Premier	Keilor	17.12 (114)	Pascoe Vale	8.13 (61)	
Essendon District	Division 1	Maribyrnong Park	14.14 (98)	West Coburg	5.9 (39)	
Essendon District	Division 2	Taylors Lakes	8.14 (62)	Westmeadows	5.13 (43)	
Geelong		Leopold	12.11 (83)	South Barwon	9.8 (62)	
Geelong & District		Thomson	14.5 (89)	Belmont	4.11 (35)	
Gippsland		Traralgon	11.12 (78)	Leongatha	7.11 (53)	
Golden Rivers		Ultima	11.10 (76)	Hay	11.9 (75)	
Goulburn Valley		Echuca	22.22 (154)	Shepparton Bears	9.4 (58)	
Hampden		South Warrnambool	4.5 (29)	North Warrnambool	3.10 (28)	
Heathcote District		White Hills	17.11 (113)	Leitchville Gunbower	6.6 (42)	
Horsham District		Harrow Balmoral	7.10 (52)	Noradjuha Quantong	5.9 (39)	
Kyabram District		Murchison-Toolamba	13.13 (91)	Shepparton East	6.8 (44)	
Loddon Valley		Marong	8.13 (61)	Pyramid Hill	3.7 (25)	
Maryborough Castlemaine District		Natte Bealiba	20.10 (130)	Trentham	7.9 (51)	
Mid Gippsland		Fish Creek	7.4 (46)	Yinnar	6.8 (44)	
Millewa		Bambill	15.14 (104)	Cardross	7.7 (49)	
Mininera & District		Penshurst	8.5 (53)	Wickliffe Lake Bolac	7.6 (48)	
Mornington Peninsula	Division 1	Mt Eliza	12.3 (75)	Pascoe Vale	7.10 (52)	
Mornington Peninsula	Division 2	Edithvale-Aspendale	11.16 (82)	Chelsea	11.11 (77)	
Murray		Congupna	9.11 (65)	Finley	9.10 (64)	
North Central		Sea Lake Nandaly	7.5 (47)	Birchip-Watchem	4.10 (34)	
North Gippsland		Woodside-District	9.8 (62)	Traralgon Tyers United	5.17 (47)	
Northern	Division 1	Heidelberg	9.19 (73)	Montmorency	4.9 (33)	
Northern	Division 2	South Morang	10.5 (65)	Diamond Creek	8.11 (59)	
Northern	Division 3	Old Paradians	17.8 (110)	Fitzroy Stars	13.17 (95)	
Omeo District		Omeo Benambra	16.9 (105)	Swifts Creek	4.5 (29)	
Outer East	Premier	Narre Warren	14.10 (94)	Wandin	7.12 (54)	
Outer East	Division 1	Healesville	9.9 (63)	Warburton-Millgrove	1.5 (11)	
Ovens & King		Greta	16.12 (108)	Bright	6.4 (40)	
Ovens & Murray		Wangaratta Rovers	11.6 (72)	Yarrawonga	9.15 (69)	
Picola & District		Waaia	12.9 (81)	Katandra	5.7 (37)	
Riddell District		Riddell	15.12 (102)	Wallan	11.5 (71)	
South West District		Tyrendarra	9.6 (60)	Dartmoor	7.9 (51)	
Southern	Division 1	Cheltenham	8.11 (59)	Dingley	8.9 (57)	
Southern	Division 2	Murrumbeena	13.9 (87)	East Malvern	9.5 (59)	
Southern	Division 3	Frankston	11.16 (82)	South Mornington	6.11 (47)	
Southern	Division 4	Hampton	8.12 (60)	Hallam	5.9 (39)	
Sunraysia		Imperials	6.11 (47)	Wentworth	6.8 (44)	
Tallangatta & District		Yackandandah	10.11 (71)	Chiltern	7.5 (47)	
Upper Murray		Bullioh	7.8 (50)	Cudgewa	6.7 (43)	
VAFA	Premier	Old Scotch	14.11 (95)	Old Brighton	10.17 (77)	
VAFA	Premier B	Old Haileybury	19.15 (129)	De La Salle	5.5 (35)	
VAFA	Premier C	Old Carey	20.17 (137)	Hampton Rovers	7.6 (48)	
VAFA	Division 1	Prahran	5.6 (36)	Parkside	2.10 (22)	
VAFA	Division 2	Elsternwick	4.17 (41)	Brunswick	3.10 (28)	
VAFA	Division 3	Canterbury	11.22 (88)	St John's	9.5 (59)	
Warrnambool & District		Nirranda	9.10 (64)	Merrivale	9.6 (60)	
West Gippsland		Nar Nar Goon	14.3 (87)	Phillip Island	10.3 (63)	
Western	Division 1	Hoppers Crossing	13.12 (90)	Werribee Districts	14.5 (89)	
Western	Division 2	Sunshine	8.8 (56)	Albion	6.13 (49)	
Wimmera		Ararat	14.3 (87)	Southern Mallee Thunder	10.3 (63)	

=== Women's ===
League	Division	Premiers		Runners-up		Ref
League	Division	Club	Score	Club	Score	Ref
AFL Barwon	Division 1	Grovedale	2.8 (20)	Geelong Amateurs	1.6 (12)	
AFL Barwon	Division 2	Anglesea	5.9 (39)	St Joseph's	3.5 (23)	
AFL Barwon	Division 3	Belmont	1.7 (13)	Modewarre	1.2 (8)	
Gippsland		Lindenow South	7.5 (47)	Boisdale Briagolong	5.1 (31)	
Mornington Peninsula	Division 1	Warragul Industrials	7.3 (45)	Mornington	5.5 (35)	
Mornington Peninsula	Division 2	Bonbeach	3.6 (24)	Edithvale-Aspendale	1.4 (10)	
Mornington Peninsula	Division 3	Frankston	2.4 (16)	Seaford	1.4 (10)	
VAFA	Premier	Old Scotch	10.4 (64)	St Kevin's	5.2 (32)	
VAFA	Premier B	Old Geelong	5.6 (36)	Fitzroy	4.5 (29)	
VAFA	Division 1	Old Brighton	5.9 (39)	Marcellin	2.6 (18)	
VAFA	Division 2	Glen Eira	9.11 (65)	Hampton Rovers	1.4 (10)	
VAFA	Division 3	Therry Penola	7.8 (50)	La Trobe University	1.8 (14)	
VAFA	Division 4	St Kevin's	2.5 (17)	MCC	2.4 (16)	

== Awards ==
=== AFL Victoria Community Football Awards ===
- Senior Coach of the Year: Ashley Watson – Rochester (Goulburn Valley League)
- Female Coach of the Year: Tina Henshaw – Seaford (Frankston & District JFL)
