= 2023 in Australian rules football in Victoria =

2023 Victorian football season
- Date: 24 March – 24 September 2023

The 2023 Victorian football season was the 154th senior season of Australian rules football in Victoria. All leagues were affiliated with AFL Victoria, with the exception of the Picola & District Football Netball League (PDFNL), which de-affiliated at the end of the 2022 season.

== Clubs ==
=== Mergers ===
The following clubs were established through mergers ahead of the 2023 season:

Original clubs	New club	League	Founded	Ref
Manningham Cobras	Old Yarra Cobras	VAFA	19 September 2022	
Yarra Old Grammarians	Old Yarra Cobras	VAFA	19 September 2022	

== Premiers ==
=== Men's ===
League	Division	Premiers		Runners-up		Ref
League	Division	Club	Score	Club	Score	Ref
Ballarat		Darley	11.5 (71)	North Ballarat	10.10 (70)	
Bellarine		Torquay	16.14 (110)	Drysdale	12.6 (78)	
Bendigo		Golden Square	10.11 (71)	Sandhurst	9.11 (65)	
Central Highlands		Gordon	13.13 (91)	Springbank	5.4 (34)	
Central Murray		Kerang	11.10 (76)	Balranald	9.12 (66)	
Colac & District		South Colac	9.5 (59)	Irrewarra-Beeac	6.2 (38)	
East Gippsland		Wy Yung	6.11 (47)	Boisdale Briagolong	5.9 (39)	
Eastern	Premier	Rowville	9.12 (66)	Vermont	8.8 (56)	
Eastern	Division 1	Mitcham	8.10 (58)	South Belgrave	8.5 (53)	
Eastern	Division 2	Boronia	15.8 (98)	Heathmont	9.12 (66)	
Eastern	Division 3	Donvale	16.8 (104)	Ferntree Gully	6.8 (44)	
Eastern	Division 4	Surrey Park	14.17 (101)	Kilsyth	6.9 (45)	
Ellinbank & District		Buln Buln	9.11 (65)	Neerim	5.5 (35)	
Essendon District	Premier	Keilor	20.7 (127)	Strathmore	11.9 (75)	
Essendon District	Division 1	Deer Park	21.14 (140)	West Coburg	6.8 (44)	
Essendon District	Division 2	Oak Park	2.15 (135)	Sunbury Kangaroos	8.8 (56)	
Geelong		Leopold	13.16 (94)	South Barwon	6.8 (44)	
Geelong & District		Inverleigh	15.5 (95)	Thomson	4.8 (32)	
Gippsland		Leongatha	14.5 (89)	Wonthaggi	7.7 (49)	
Golden Rivers		Hay	11.15 (81)	Ultima	6.16 (52)	
Goulburn Valley		Echuca	15.13 (103)	Kyabram	9.13 (67)	
Hampden		South Warrnambool	9.13 (67)	North Warrnambool	4.8 (32)	
Heathcote District		Mount Pleasant	12.7 (79)	Heathcote	9.6 (60)	
Horsham District		Harrow Balmoral	11.3 (69)	Jeparit-Rainbow	7.7 (49)	
Kyabram District		Lancaster	19.11 (125)	Nagambie	8.12 (60)	
Loddon Valley		Marong	8.16 (64)	Pyramid Hill	6.12 (48)	
Maryborough Castlemaine District		Harcourt	11.7 (73)	Carisbrook	9.8 (62)	
Mid Gippsland		Fish Creek	9.12 (66)	Newborough	5.8 (38)	
Millewa		Bambill	12.12 (84)	Gol Gol	11.5 (71)	
Mininera & District		Tatyoon	10.2 (62)	Woorndoo Mortlake	6.12 (48)	
Mornington Peninsula Nepean	Division 1	Dromana	14.13 (97)	Frankston YCW	6.7 (43)	
Mornington Peninsula Nepean	Division 2	Mornington	9.7 (61)	Somerville	7.10 (52)	
Murray		Mulwala	14.14 (98)	Congupna	9.11 (65)	
North Central		Sea Lake	10.16 (76)	Nullawil	9.8 (62)	
North Gippsland		Traralgon Tyers United	4.14 (38)	Woodside	2.8 (20)	
Northern	Division 1	Heidelberg	15.7 (97)	Bundoora	11.8 (74)	
Northern	Division 2	Eltham	12.13 (85)	Diamond Creek	6.8 (44)	
Northern	Division 3	Laurimar	13.5 (83)	Mernda	11.11 (77)	
Omeo District		Swifts Creek	11.6 (72)	Omeo Benambra	7.8 (50)	
Outer East	Premier	Wandin	21.15 (141)	Narre Warren	11.12 (78)	
Outer East	Division 1	Emerald	14.16 (100)	Berwick Springs	5.11 (41)	
Outer East	Division 2	Powelltown	17.12 (114)	Alexandra	15.11 (101)	
Ovens & King		Bonnie Doon	8.8 (56)	Bright	6.2 (38)	
Ovens & Murray		Yarrawonga	11.10 (76)	Albury	10.12 (72)	
Picola & District		Waaia	12.11 (83)	Strathmerton	6.7 (43)	
Riddell District		Diggers Rest	16.9 (105)	Woodend-Hesket	9.8 (62)	
South West District		Coleraine	9.7 (61)	Cavendish	4.9 (33)	
Southern	Division 1	Cheltenham	7.17 (59)	Cranbourne	8.8 (56)	
Southern	Division 2	East Brighton	13.14 (92)	Murrumbeena	7.7 (49)	
Southern	Division 3	Endeavour Hills	13.16 (94)	Frankston	11.11 (77)	
Southern	Division 4	South Mornington	15.9 (99)	Hampton	12.7 (79)	
Sunraysia		Irymple	8.14 (62)	Robinvale Euston	4.9 (33)	
Tallangatta & District		Chiltern	10.9 (69)	Kiewa-Sandy Creek	9.12 (66)	
Upper Murray		Cudgewa	22.14 (146)	Bullioh	8.4 (52)	
VAFA	Premier	Collegians	19.16 (130)	St Kevin's	6.9 (45)	
VAFA	Premier B	St Bernard's	15.13 (103)	Fitzroy	10.12 (72)	
VAFA	Premier C	Old Ivanhoe	14.20 (104)	Old Camberwell	9.8 (62)	
VAFA	Division 1	Glen Eira	15.13 (103)	Oakleigh	6.13 (49)	
VAFA	Division 2	Parkside	10.8 (68)	Old Yarra Cobras	10.5 (65)	
VAFA	Division 3	Elsternwick	21.19 (145)	Hawthorn	12.6 (78)	
VAFA	Division 4	North Brunswick	10.9 (69)	Albert Park	8.6 (54)	
Warrnambool & District		Nirranda	9.8 (62)	Merrivale	6.5 (41)	
West Gippsland		Inverloch-Kongwak	10.5 (75)	Phillip Island	6.4 (40)	
Western Region	Division 1	Werribee Districts	9.11 (65)	Point Cook	5.13 (43)	
Western Region	Division 2	Parkside	8.13 (61)	Albion	8.11 (59)	
Western Region	Division 3	Suns	14.11 (95)	Albanvale	14.9 (93)	
Wimmera		Ararat	10.13 (73)	Southern Mallee Giants	6.16 (52)	

=== Women's ===
League	Division	Premiers		Runners-up		Ref
League	Division	Club	Score	Club	Score	Ref
AFL Barwon	Division 1	Geelong Amateurs	4.10 (34)	Grovedale	2.1 (13)	
AFL Barwon	Division 2	Geelong West	3.5 (23)	Thomson	3.4 (22)	
AFL Barwon	Division 3	Modewarre	6.0 (36)	North Geelong	1.8 (14)	
AFL North East Border		Lavington	3.8 (26)	Wodonga Raiders	4.1 (25)	
Ballarat		Darley	9.11 (65)	Redan	2.3 (15)	
Eastern	Premier	Eastern Devils	5.3 (33)	SBL Wolves Black	4.6 (30)	
Eastern	Division 1	Boronia	3.8 (26)	The Basin Red	3.3 (21)	
Eastern	Division 2	East Ringwood	12.15 (87)	Surrey Park	3.1 (19)	
Eastern	Division 3	Kilsyth	8.2 (50)	Eastern Devils Black	4.8 (32)	
Eastern	Division 4	Mooroolbark	7.12 (54)	Mitcham	0.4 (4)	
Essendon District	Premier	Oak Park	3.8 (26)	Aberfeldie	3.2 (20)	
Essendon District	Division 1	Essendon Doutta Stars	7.6 (48)	Greenvale	2.9 (21)	
Essendon District	Division 2	Airport West	8.7 (55)	Aberfeldie 2	2.1 (13)	
Northern	Division 1	Montmorency 1	6.13 (49)	Banyule	3.3 (21)	
Northern	Division 2	St Mary's	6.8 (44)	Heidelberg	5.3 (33)	
Northern	Division 3	Wallan	3.2 (20)	Darebin	2.1 (13)	
Outer East	Division 1	Olinda-Ferny Creek	9.6 (60)	Pakenham	2.5 (17)	
Outer East	Division 2	Belgrave	2.9 (21)	Seville	0.5 (5)	
South Eastern Women's	Premier	Mornington	5.13 (43)	Frankston	3.2 (20)	
South Eastern Women's	Division 2	Pearcedale	7.5 (47)	Mornington	3.2 (20)	
Southern	Division 1	Casey Thunder 1	9.6 (60)	Narre South Saints	4.2 (26)	
Southern	Division 2	East Brighton	12.10 (82)	Lyndale	1.1 (7)	
VAFA	Premier	St Kevin's	6.9 (45)	Kew	3.2 (20)	
VAFA	Premier B	Monash Blues	3.3 (21)	Old Yarra Cobras	3.1 (19)	
VAFA	Division 1	Marcellin	10.8 (68)	Beaumaris	4.8 (32)	
VAFA	Division 2	Williamstown CYMS	10.9 (69)	Parkdale Vultures	2.11 (23)	
VAFA	Division 3	AJAX	5.12 (42)	Power House	2.3 (15)	
VAFA	Division 4	UHS-VU	4.2 (26)	Old Carey	2.3 (15)	
Western Region	Division 1	Spotswood	5.5 (35)	Caroline Springs	5.4 (34)	
Western Region	Division 2	West Footscray	6.7 (43)	Wyndhamvale	6.5 (41)	
