= Bell Post Hill Football Club =

Bell Post Hill

Names
- Full name: Bell Post Hill Football & Netball Club Inc
- Nickname: Panthers
- Motto: "Many People, One Attitude"

2018 season
- After finals: Premiers
- Leading goalkicker: Jayden Ettridge (60)
- Best and fairest: Matt James

Club details
- Founded: 1977; 49 years ago
- Colours
- President: Bill McAuliffe
- Coach: Justin Tarr
- Ground: Myers Reserve, Bell Post Hill, Victoria

Uniforms
Home

The Bell Post Hill Football Netball Club, nicknamed the Panthers, is a football club and netball club based in the residential suburb of Bell Post Hill, Victoria.

The club teams currently compete in the Geelong & District Football League (GDFL). The football section fields senior, reserves and under, 14s, 12s, 10s and youth girls teams. Bell Post Hill is the current reigning GDFL premier, having won 8 of the last 9 GDFL premierships.

Their home ground is Myers Reserve, Creamery Rd. They are currently coached by former premiership captain Brad Martin. The team jerseys are red and blue vertical stripes.

== History ==
The club was formed in 1976 as a junior football club, in 1977 a senior side entered the Geelong & District Football League.

Bell Post Hill reached their first senior Grand Final in 1983 losing to Thomson Football Club. They reached the Grand Final again in 1988 losing narrowly to Lara Sporting Club, they wouldn't reach another for 20 years until 2008 when they again lost to Thomson. In 2009 the Panthers again reached the Grand Final, losing to East Geelong in a spiteful contest. The hoodoo was finally broken in 2010, in their third consecutive GDFL Grand Final appearance, defeating minor premiers Werribee Centrals by 103 points.

== Honours ==
- Senior Premierships (7) – 2010, 2011, 2012, 2014, 2015, 2016, 2017
- Senior Grand Finals (12) – 1983, 1988, 2008, 2009, 2010, 2011, 2012, 2013, 2014, 2015, 2016, 2017
- Reserves Premierships (4) – 1994, 2000, 2012, 2017
- Under-18 Premierships (3) – 1981, 1989, 1992
- Senior League Best & Fairest (3) – Dale Tonkin (1983), Shaun Lewis (2008), Shane Tobin (2013), Matty James (2018), Dylan Whitney (2021)
- Senior Grand Final Best-on-Ground (6) – Jamie Pyle (2010), Justin Tarr (2012), Atilla Sulics (2014), Jake Barlow (2015), Tim Barton (2016), Jayden Ettridge (2017)
- Reserve League Best & Fairest (2) – Josh Bacely (2013), Joel Washington (2017)
- Reserves Grand Final Best-on-Ground (2) – Robert Law (2012), Russell Douglas (2017)

== Senior Premierships ==
=== 2010 Premiership ===
Bell Post Hill went into the 2010 GDFL finals series with a 15–3 regular season record, finishing second on the ladder, one game behind Werribee Centrals. The Panthers faced old rival Bannockburn in the Qualifying final, a five-goal second quarter set up a 38-point win.

The Second Semi-Final saw Bell Post Hill face Werribee Centrals, after a tight first quarter, Bell Post Hill once again rallied in the second and eventually ran away with a 68-point victory and a spot in the Grand Final.

With Werribee Centrals defeating Bannockburn in the preliminary final, the Panthers would face the Centurions twice in a row. Bell Post Hill came flying out of the blocks and kicked 6 goals to 1 in the first quarter and had 10 goals on the board at half time, it should have been more due to some inaccurate kicking for goal. After half-time the Panthers put the foot down keeping the Centurions goalless in the third quarter and then kicking 7 goals in the last to run out 103 point winners.

==== 2010 Senior Premiership ====
| Bell Post Hill | 6.7 | 10.13 | 14.20 | 21.23 (149) |
| Werribee Centrals | 1.3 | 4.5 | 4.7 | 6.10 (46) |

Goals: Bell Post Hill – J Pyle 8, M Jovanovic 4, D Holzfeind 3, R Cavka 2, T Barton, S Lewis, C Bacely, C Moreland 1

Werribee Centrals – T Johns 2, D Leatch 1, N Lovell 1, B Pilkington 1, S Calbert 1

Best: Bell Post Hill – J Pyle, D Holzfeind, B Martin, J Symes, S Overall, C Moreland

Werribee Centrals – A Burke, B Pilkington, D Hall, D Leatch, B Chugg

==== Premiership Team ====
| B: | S Tobin | S Overall | D Jenkins |
| HB: | B McNamara | B Grgic | B Martin (capt.) |
| C: | T Fursland | D Holzfeind | S Lymer |
| HF: | T Barton | R Cavka | A Pisano |
| F: | C Bacely | M Jovanovic | J Pyle |
| Foll: | J Symes | C Moreland | S Lewis |
| I/C: | A Fantella | A Baird | |
| | A Venner | T Fletcher | |
| Coach | B Grgic | | |

=== 2011 Premiership ===
After finishing top of the ladder, the Panthers went straight through to the Grand Final by defeating East Geelong by 21 points in the second semi final. They then faced the Eagles again two weeks later in the Grand Final. Trailing by 19 points at half-time and 11 points at three-quarter time, the Panthers surged in the last-quarter, kicking 7 goals to 1, to run out 27 point winners and claim back-to-back senior premierships.

==== Scorecard ====
| Bell Post Hill | 6.1 | 7.3 | 10.7 | 17.10 (112) |
| East Geelong | 5.1 | 10.4 | 12.6 | 13.7 (85) |

Goals: Bell Post Hill – M Jovanovic 4, C Addie, A Baird 3, T Fursland, A Pisano, C Bacely, D Holzfeind, S Tobin, C Moreland, B Grgic 1

East Geelong – B Connors 7, A Skrobalak 3, K Robertston, R Chamberlain, R O'Toole 1

Best: Bell Post Hill – C Moreland, D Holzfeind M Jovanovic, T Fursland, C Addie, A Baird

East Geelong – B Connors, R O'Toole, L Edmondson, C Hunter, R Closter, B Bolton

==== Premiership team ====
| B: | S Tobin | S Overall | S Lymer |
| HB: | B McNamara | B Grgic | B Martin (capt.) |
| C: | T Fursland | D Holzfeind | L Miller |
| HF: | C Addie | N Popovski | A Pisano |
| F: | C Bacely | M Jovanovic | J Tarr |
| Foll: | J Symes | C Moreland | S Lewis |
| I/C: | A Fantella | A Baird | |
| | A Riches | T Fletcher | |
| Coach | B Grgic | | |

=== 2012 Premiership ===
Once again Bell Post Hill finished top of the ladder and progressed through to the Grand Final by defeating Thomson in the second semi final by 31 points. For the second consecutive year they were drawn against East Geelong in the Grand Final. After a bruising encounter the Panthers finished off the gallant Eagles and recorded a 13-point victory, with Justin Tarr kicking 6 goals and being named best-on-ground. The day was made even sweeter with the Reserves winning their first premiership in 12 years and recording an historic double for the club.

==== 2012 Senior Premiership ====
| Bell Post Hill | 2.2 | 5.5 | 10.8 | 13.10 (88) |
| East Geelong | 2.1 | 5.4 | 8.6 | 11.9 (75) |

Goals: Bell Post Hill – J Tarr 6, C Moreland, D Holzfeind 2, D Witney, T Barton, S Lewis 1

East Geelong – J Bouwman 4, L Murphy 3, R Closter 2, R Coy, B Bolton 1

Best: Bell Post Hill – J Tarr, D Holzfeind, C Moreland, T Barton, T Fursland, C Addie

East Geelong – R Chamberlain, L Murphy, K Robertson, J Mawson, J Challis, R O'Toole

==== Premiership Team ====
| B: | W Urquhart | C Addie | S Lymer |
| HB: | B McNamara | N Popovski | B Martin (capt.) |
| C: | T Fursland | D Holzfeind | T Fletcher |
| HF: | D Witney | T Barton | A Pisano |
| F: | C Bacely | J Tarr | J Page |
| Foll: | J Symes | C Moreland | S Lewis |
| I/C: | A Fantella | A Baird | |
| | S Overall | S Tobin | |
| Coach | B Grgic | | |

==== 2012 Reserves Premiership ====
| Bell Post Hill | 2.2 | 6.3 | 11.4 | 14.7 (91) |
| North Geelong | 5.1 | 8.5 | 10.7 | 10.8 (68) |

Goals: Bell Post Hill – J Rodriguez 5, B Muir, N Razmoski, A Kozina, A Witney 2

North Geelong – T Elsey, B Nolan, L Vrtacic 2, C Milne, P Longstaff, A Koschel, D Fisher 1

Best: Bell Post Hill – R Law, J Rodriguez, N Razmoski, J Washington, N Martinu, A Kozina

North Geelong – B Nolan, P Longstaff, A Koschel, K Harrington, T Elsey, B Scown

=== 2014 Premiership ===
After the disappointment of losing the 2013 Grand Final to North Geelong, the Panthers re-grouped and had an outstanding home and away season, finish top of the ladder with only one loss. After a week off they met North Geelong in the Semi Final, which the Magpies won in an upset. They recovered the next week to beat Inverleigh and set up a re-match with North Geelong in the Grand Final. A tough first half saw the Panthers take a 10-point lead into half time, but the Panthers pulled away with a barnstorming third quarter and finished the game off in style to record a memorable 54 point win. Attila Sulics was named Man of the Match after a great performance off half back.

==== 2014 Senior Premiership ====
| Bell Post Hill | 2.2 | 7.6 | 12.14 | 17.19 (121) |
| North Geelong | 1.6 | 5.8 | 7.11 | 9.13 (67) |

Goals: Bell Post Hill – J Tarr 5, J Page, C Bacely, S Macleod 2, T Barton, A Carter, R Wood, D Witney, M Lentini, W Urquhart 1

North Geelong – J Pitman, S Clark, B Bryant 2, L Wright, P Breguet, D Kee 1

Best: Bell Post Hill – A Sulics, S Macleod, J Tarr, D Witney, C Bacely, L Turner

North Geelong – J Woods, S Richert, D Eales, D Fitzsimmons, L Hardman, T Reynolds

==== Premiership Team ====
| B: | B McNamara | C Addie (capt.) | S Lymer |
| HB: | A Sulics | N Popovski | A Fantella |
| C: | T Fursland | S Macleod | A Pisano |
| HF: | D Witney | T Barton | D Walve |
| F: | W Urquhart | J Tarr | J Page (capt.) |
| Foll: | R Lovitt | C Bacely | R Wood |
| I/C: | M Lentini | A Carter | |
| | A Witney | L Turner | |
| Coach | B Grgic | | |

=== 2015 Senior Premiership ===
| Bell Post Hill | 6.8 | 10.11 | 17.20 | 21.23 (149) |
| North Geelong | 0.2 | 2.5 | 6.6 | 9.10 (64) |

Goals: Bell Post Hill – N Costello 6, R Wood, W Kelly, J Tarr 3, L Turner 2, T Barton, D Walve, T Fursland, M Lentini 1

North Geelong – L Parker, D Eales, J Pitman, L Wright 2, J Chandler

Best: Bell Post Hill – J Barlow, D Witney, W Kelly, R Wood, R Lovitt, L Turner

North Geelong – T Davis, L Hayes, L Wright, D Mathisen, J Chandler, D Fitzsimmons

==== Premiership Team ====
| B: | B McNamara | C Addie (capt.) | S Lymer |
| HB: | A Sulics | N Popovski | A Fantella |
| C: | T Fursland | W Kelly | A Pisano |
| HF: | D Witney | T Barton | D Walve |
| F: | W Urquhart | J Tarr | N Costello |
| Foll: | R Lovitt | C Bacely | R Wood |
| I/C: | M Lentini | J Barlow | |
| | A Witney | L Turner | |
| Coach | B Grgic | | |

=== 2016 Senior Premiership ===
| Bell Post Hill | 4.2 | 8.7 | 10.10 | 14.14 (98) |
| Bannockburn | 3.6 | 4.9 | 4.13 | 4.16 (40) |

Goals: Bell Post Hill – N Costello 3, J Ettridge, J Page, L Turner, J Tarr 2, A Fantella, J Flaccavento, D Holzfeind 1

Bannockburn – B Harding, C Jervies, J Brauman, M Tyquin 1

Best: Bell Post Hill – T Barton, J Ettridge, D Holzfeind, A Fantella, R Lovitt, C Addie

Bannockburn – M Tyquin, J Brauman, D Milburn, J Peters, C Jervies

==== Premiership Team ====
| B: | A Sulics | C Addie (capt.) | N Popovski |
| HB: | W Urquhart | S Lymer | T Barton |
| C: | M Lentini | D Walve | J Ettridge |
| HF: | J Page (capt.) | J Barlow | T Fursland |
| F: | L Turner | J Tarr | N Costello |
| Foll: | R Lovitt | A Fantella | D Holzfeind |
| I/C: | R Burke | J Flaccavento | |
| | W Kelly | A Pisano | |
| Coach | S Lewry | | |

=== 2017 Senior Premiership ===
| Bell Post Hill | 4.2 | 9.2 | 12.2 | 17.2 (104) |
| Inverleigh | 1.3 | 3.7 | 7.7 | 9.11 (65) |

Goals: Bell Post Hill – J Ettridge 6, J Barlow 3, N Costello, J Page 2, M Lentini, M Gavin, L Meyrich, A Sulics 1

Inverleigh – J Kennedy-Hunt 3, B Hutchinson, R Logue, W Hamer, R Soldic, M Grozdanovski, C Meehan 1

Best: Bell Post Hill – J Ettridge, J Barlow, T Rabbas, C Bacely, A Fantella, R Lovitt

Inverleigh – D Grundell, B Hutchinson, M Best, J Fiolet, N Walsh, B Cations

==== Premiership team ====
| B: | W Urquhart | C Addie (capt.) | N Martinu |
| HB: | S Lymer | T Barton | A Sulics |
| C: | M Lentini | A Fantella | D Walve |
| HF: | L Turner | J Barlow | J Ettridge |
| F: | J Page | N Costello | J Yates |
| Foll: | R Lovitt | T Rabbas | C Bacely |
| I/C: | R Burke | L Meyrich | |
| | D Gray | M Gavin | |
| Coach | B Martin | | |

== Bibliography ==
- Cat Country: History of Football in the Geelong Region by John Stoward – ISBN 978-0-9577515-8-3
