= Les Batty =

Australian rules footballer

Personal information
- Full name: Leslie Fred Batty
- Born: 30 September 1887; Ondit, Victoria
- Died: 20 September 1930 (aged 42); Geelong, Victoria
- Original team: East Geelong (GDFA)
- Height: 183 cm (6 ft 0 in)
- Weight: 86 kg (190 lb)

Playing career^{1}
Years	Club	Games (Goals)
1909	Geelong	17 (0)
1910	Carlton	1 (0)
Total		18 (0)
- ^{1} Playing statistics correct to the end of 1910.

Leslie Fred Batty (30 September 1887 – 20 September 1930) was an Australian rules footballer who played with Geelong and Carlton in the Victorian Football League (VFL).
