= Dale Smyth =

Australian rules footballer and coach

Personal information
- Born: 18 May 1962 (age 64)
- Original team: Inverleigh
- Height: 175 cm (5 ft 9 in)
- Weight: 76 kg (168 lb)

Playing career^{1}
Years	Club	Games (Goals)
1980–1982	Geelong	7 (1)
- ^{1} Playing statistics correct to the end of 1982.

Dale Smyth (born 18 May 1962) is a former Australian rules footballer who played with Geelong in the Victorian Football League (VFL).

An Inverleigh recruit, Smyth was just 17 when he made his league debut in the 1980 VFL season. His first game came against North Melbourne at Arden Street in round four and he also played in Geelong's five point win over Hawthorn the following week, before losing his place in the side. He didn't feature in the seniors at all in 1981, but made five appearances in 1982, from rounds 15 to 19.

Smyth played in three premierships with the Geelong reserves (1980, 1981, 1982).

He returned to Inverleigh as coach for the 2012 Geelong & District Football League season. The club were unable to make the finals and after a slow start in 2013, Smyth was replaced.
