= Geelong West Giants =

Names
- Full name: Geelong West Giants Inc.
- Nickname: Giants

Club details
- Founded: 23 November 2016
- Colours
- Competition: GFNL and GDFNL
- Coach: GFNL: Garry Hocking; GDFNL: Scott Frangos
- Ground: West Oval; Bakers Oval

Uniforms
Home

Other information
- Official website: geelongwestgiants.com.au

The Geelong West Giants are an Australian rules football and netball club based in the Victorian suburb of North Geelong. The club fields teams in both the Geelong Football Netball League (GFNL) and Geelong & District Football Netball League (GDFNL).

== History ==
The Geelong West Giants were born out of a merger of the Geelong West St Peters Football Club (the Roosters, also known as "Red West") and Geelong West Sporting Club (the Cheetahs, also known as "Blue West") in 2016. At the time, both clubs were struggling with periods of minimal on-field success.

Initially, the "Giants" name was to be used as part of a rebrand by the Roosters to align with Australian Football League (AFL) club Greater Western Sydney Giants, given the similarities between the Roosters' abbreviation, "GWSP", and the AFL Giants' abbreviation, GWS. Officials from the Roosters met with officials from GWS in July 2016 to facilitate the move, with the potential to incorporate the Cheetahs into the new club should it be agreed upon by all parties.

Later that month, members of the Roosters voted unanimously to rebrand the club under the new moniker and to continue fielding teams in their current respective leagues, the GFNL and GDFNL. Two weeks, the merger became a formality as an "overwhelming majority" of Cheetahs members voted to join forces with the Roosters.

== Seasons ==
Premiers	Grand Finalist	Minor premiers	Finals appearance	Wooden spoon

=== GFNL ===
Year	League	Finish	W	L	D	Coach	Captain	Best and fairest	Leading goalkicker	Goals	Ref
2017	GFNL	10th	6	12	0	Andy Viola					
2018	GFNL	10th	3	15	0	Greg Mellor					
2019	GFNL	9th	5	13	0	Greg Mellor					
2020	GFNL	(No season due to COVID-19 pandemic)									
2021	GFNL	6th	7	4	1	Greg Mellor					
2022	GFNL	7th	12	6	0	Greg Mellor					
2023	GFNL	7th	10	8	0	Greg Mellor					
2024	GFNL	7th	6	12	0	Greg Mellor					

=== GDFNL ===
Year	League	Finish	W	L	D	Coach	Captain	Best and fairest	Leading goalkicker	Goals	Ref
2017	GDFNL	6th	8	9	1		Scott Jervies				
2018	GDFNL	4th	12	6	0						
2019	GDFNL	8th	7	10	10						
2020	GDFNL	(No season due to COVID-19 pandemic)									
2021	GDFNL	5th	7	4	0						
2022	GDFNL	7th	9	9	0						
2023	GDFNL	8th	6	12	0	Mitch Wight	Justin Carey				
2024	GDFNL	TBC				Scott Frangos					

== AFL players ==
- Brandon Ryan − Hawthorn, Brisbane Lions
- Cameron Fleeton - GWS Giants
- Angus Hastie − St Kilda
- Jesse Mellor - Geelong
