= Anakie =

Anakie may refer to:

- Anakie Siding, Queensland
  - Anakie, Queensland
- Anakie, Victoria
  - Anakie Football Club
