= Russell Mitchell (footballer) =

Australian rules footballer (born 1964)

Personal information
- Born: 17 June 1964 (age 62)
- Original team: Bell Post Hill
- Height: 185 cm (6 ft 1 in)
- Weight: 73 kg (161 lb)

Playing career^{1}
Years	Club	Games (Goals)
1985–1986	Geelong	2 (0)
- ^{1} Playing statistics correct to the end of 1986.

Russell Mitchell (born 17 June 1964) is a former Australian rules footballer who played with Geelong in the Victorian Football League (VFL).

Mitchell played his early football at Bell Post Hill in the Geelong & District Football League. He had appeared in only three reserves games for Geelong in 1985 when he was named to make his senior debut, against North Melbourne at the Melbourne Cricket Ground, in round 16. Geelong won the match by 40 points and Mitchell, who was on the field for only one quarter, didn't record a disposal. He lost his place in the team the following round when Neville Bruns returned, after having his jaw broken by Leigh Matthews. His only other senior game for Geelong came in the opening round of the 1986 VFL season, in a loss to Fitzroy at Kardinia Park. He had 10 kicks and four handballs.

He was cut from the Geelong list at the end of the 1986 season and left for the Bellarine Football League.

Also a cricketer, Mitchell played over 400 matches for the Newtown & Chilwell Cricket Club and is a life member of the club.
