= Russell Mitchell =

Russell Mitchell may refer to:

- Russell Mitchell (footballer) (born 1964), Australian former VFL player
- Russell Mitchell (gymnast) (1942–2023), American Olympic gymnast
- Russ Mitchell (born 1960), American journalist
- Russ Mitchell (baseball) (born 1985), American former MLB player
- Russell Mitchell (sprinter) (born 1960), American sprinter, 1983 All-American for the SMU Mustangs track and field team
