= David Manson =

David Manson may refer to:

- David Manson (militiaman) (1753–1836), Irish-born American patriot who fought in the American Revolutionary War
- David Manson (schoolmaster) (1716-1799), Irish schoolmaster
- David Manson (footballer, born 1871) (1871-1933), Scottish footballer, see 1894–95 Manchester City F.C. season
- David Manson (producer) (born 1952), American film and television producer, screenwriter and director
- David Ames Manson (1841–1929), merchant and political figure in Quebec
- David Manson (footballer) (born 1951), Australian rules footballer
- Dave Manson (born 1967), Canadian ice hockey player

== See also ==
- David Monson (disambiguation)
- David Munson (disambiguation)
