= Murray Witcombe =

Australian rules footballer

Personal information
- Full name: Murray Witcombe
- Born: 1 November 1956 (age 70)
- Original teams: Inverleigh; Geelong College
- Height: 182 cm (6 ft 0 in)
- Weight: 72 kg (159 lb)

Playing career^{1}
Years	Club	Games (Goals)
1976 — 1986	Geelong	121 (79)
- ^{1} Playing statistics correct to the end of 1986.

Murray Witcombe (born 1 November 1956) is a former Australian rules footballer who played for Geelong in the Victorian Football League (now known as the Australian Football League).
