= Galvin Park Reserve =

- Interactive map of Galvin Park Reserve
- Location: Parklands Grove, Werribee
- Coordinates: 37.8862°S 144.6507°E
- Capacity: 1,000
- Surface: Grass

Tenants
- Werribee City; Werribee Centrals

Galvin Park Reserve is a multi-use sporting reserve in Melbourne, Australia. It is mainly used for Australian rules football and Football and is the home ground for Werribee Centrals Sports Club and Werribee City FC. The stadium has a capacity of 1,000 people.

The venue was chosen as the training base for Morocco for the 2023 FIFA Women's World Cup.
