= Sunshine Heights Football Club =

Sunshine Heights

Names
- Full name: Sunshine Heights Football Club
- Nickname(s): Dragons

Club details
- Founded: 1971; 54 years ago
- Colours
- Competition: Western Region Football League
- Premierships: 4 (1979, 1988, 1998, 2008)
- Ground(s): Ainsworth Reserve, Sunshine West

Other information
- Official website: shfc.com.au

The Sunshine Heights Football Club is an Australian rules football club which compete in the WRFL since 1988. They are based in the Melbourne suburb of Sunshine West.

== History ==
In 1971, the club first fielded a senior team in the Western Suburbs FL. In 1979, they defeated Werribee Centrals for the premiership of the Western Suburbs FL.

The club transferred to the Footscray District FL in 1988. It won the A2 premiership defeating East Brunswick in its first year.

== Premierships ==
- Div 1 = 1979 (WSFL)
- Div 2 = 2008
- Div 3 = 1988, 1998
- Div 5 = 2024 U12's

== VFL/AFL players ==
- James Gowans – St Kilda
- Chris Burton – Western Bulldogs
- Shane Madigan - Fitzroy Football club
- Kristie-Lee Weston-Turner - Western Bulldogs AFLW

== Bibliography ==
- History of the WRFL/FDFL by Kevin Hillier – ISBN 9781863356015
- History of football in Melbourne's north west by John Stoward – ISBN 9780980592924
