= Neil Tucker =

Australian rules footballer

Personal information
- Full name: Neil Tucker
- Born: 9 May 1915
- Died: 6 October 1981 (aged 66)
- Original teams: Anakie & Geelong West
- Height: 178 cm (5 ft 10 in)
- Weight: 84 kg (185 lb)

Playing career^{1}
Years	Club	Games (Goals)
1935–1941, 1944	Geelong	61 (20)
1943	Carlton	2 (0)
Total		63 (20)
- ^{1} Playing statistics correct to the end of 1944.

Neil Tucker (9 May 1915 – 6 October 1981) was an Australian rules footballer who played with Carlton and Geelong in the Victorian Football League (VFL).

Tucker was one of four players that left Geelong and play with Carlton during the Second World War. Geelong spent two years in recess, 1942 and 1943, during that time Tucker managed two games with Carlton. When Geelong returned to competition in 1944, so did Tucker.
