= Geelong West Cheetahs =

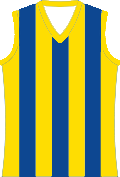

Names
- Full name: Geelong West Cheetahs Football and Netball Club Inc.
- Nickname(s): Cheetahs, Blue West

Club details
- Founded: 1926
- Dissolved: 2016
- Colours: Blue Yellow
- Competition: Geelong DFL since 1986
- Premierships: 1935, 1956, 1966, 1971, 1978, 1987.
- Ground(s): West Oval, Geelong West

The Geelong West Cheetahs Football and Netball Club was an Australian rules football club that last competed in the Geelong & District Football League from 1986 to the end of the 2016 season. They were based in the Geelong suburb of Geelong West. At the end of 2016, the club merged with the Geelong West St Peters Football Club to form the Geelong West Giants. The Giants have fielded separate teams in the GFL and the GDFL since 2017.

== History ==
Formed as the Geelong West Cricket & Football Club in 1926, while known as the Cheetahs early on the locals call them Blue West, to distinguish them from the VFA club Red West. After the war, they joined the GDFL in 1946.

The Cheetahs competed in the GDFL Evelyn Hurst competition from 1958 to 1978. It was part of the breakaway movement that created the Geelong Football League in 1979. Falling standards on the field lead the club to be demoted to the Geelong DFL in 1986. Circa 2003, GWCFC became known as the Geelong West Sporting Club to acknowledge the incorporation of the netball team. It then officially changed its name to the Geelong West Cheetahs Football and Netball Club Inc. in July 2013.

The club remains active as an incorporated association, holding its yearly AGMs in November.

== Home ground ==
The club's traditional home venue was Bakers Oval in Shannon Avenue, Geelong West. In 2008, the club moved to play its fixtures at West Oval in Church Street, but its administrative and social base remained at Bakers Oval.

== Premierships ==
- 1935, 1956, 1966, 1971, 1978, 1987.

== VFL/AFL players ==
- Warren Canning - Geelong
- Barry Eddy - Geelong
- Graham Hunter - Geelong
- Marty Lynch - Geelong , South Melbourne
- Bill Tomlinson - Geelong

== Book ==
- Cat Country - History of Football In The Geelong Region - John Stoward - ISBN 978-0-9577515-8-3
