= Paul Jeffreys (footballer) =

Australian rules footballer

Personal information
- Full name: Paul Jeffreys
- Born: 10 March 1959 (age 67)
- Original team: Thomson

Playing career^{1}
Years	Club	Games (Goals)
1977 — 1985	Geelong	91 (23)
- ^{1} Playing statistics correct to the end of 1985.

Paul Jeffreys (born 10 March 1959) is a former Australian rules footballer who played for Geelong in the Victorian Football League (now known as the Australian Football League).
