= David Monson =

David Monson could refer to:

- David Smith Monson (born 1945), American politician from Utah
- David Monson (North Dakota politician) (born 1950)

== See also ==
- David Monsoh (born 1973), Ivorian record producer
- David Monson Bunis (born 1952), American-Israeli academic
- David Manson (disambiguation)
- David Munson (disambiguation)
