= Hrvoje Matkovic (soccer) =

Australian soccer player and coach

Personal information
- Date of birth: 31 July 1981 (age 45)
- Place of birth: Vukovar, Croatia

Youth career
- 1992-1993: Hertha BSC Berlin
- 1993-1995: St Albans Saints
- 1995-1996: Dinamo Zagreb
- 1996-1998: Melbourne Knights FC

Senior career*
Years	Team	Apps	(Gls)
1998-2000	Melbourne Knights FC	14	(3)
2000-2001	Fawkner Blues	12	(4)
2001	Home United	19	(8)
2002	SAFFC	16	(4)
2003–2004	St Albans Saints	22	(9)
2005-2010	Melbourne Knights	48	(17)
2010-2011	Heidelberg United FC	15	(3)
2011-2012	Werribee City FC	14	(4)
2012–2014	St Albans Saints SC	31	(1)
2014–2017	FC Strathmore		

Managerial career
- 2016-2021: FC Strathmore
- 2022-Current: Western Suburbs Soccer Club
- * Club domestic league appearances and goals

Hrvoje Matkovic (born 31 July 1981) is a Croatian-Australian footballer.

== Life ==
In 1991, he fled war-torn Croatia to Berlin, Germany, where he started playing for Hertha BSC. In 1993, the family migrated to Melbourne, Australia and he joined St Albans Saints as a junior. Throughout his junior days he had a stint at Dinamo Zagreb juniors and he represented The State of Victoria in National Championship's held in Brisbane.

In 2001, he went to Singapore where he spent two years, playing for Home United and Singapore Armed Forces Football Club. Upon his return, he joined The Victorian Premier League and played with St Albans Saints Melbourne Knights and Heidelberg Warriors. He sustained a serious knee injury playing for Heidelberg Warriors which ruled him out for year. After his return from injury, he played for the Werribee City Bees St Albans Saints and finally retired from playing at Strathmore Split, where he continued in a coaching role.

== Singapore ==
Hrvoje Signed under Robert Alberts with Home United of the Singaporean S.League mid-2001. Hrvoje made an impressive debut in a 2-1 league win over Balestier Central as a forward left winger assisting Egmar Gonçalves and Indra Sahdan Daud for the first goal on the 14th minute and constantly posing a threat to the opposition on the left side. Hrvoje was the brightest young prospect that hit the S-league helping Home united win the Singapore cup with a record win 8–0 against the league winners Geylang United. He also scored an impressive Free kick against Clementi Khalsa with another Australian Grant Barlow in goals the goal was one of the better ones seen that year.

The Australian has had his bad moments too as he was suspended in a 1–0 victory over Jurong for reciprocating Cobra's defender Imran Mohamed's challenge against him by lashing out with his foot while on the ground.

Following Year declining numerous NSL offers Hrvoje decided to stay in Singapore and sign one-year deal under Fandi Ahmad for Singapore Armed forces, the youngster linked up with Croatian striker Mirko Grabovac and Nenad Baćina to help them win the S-league that year unfortunately Hrvoje sustained an injury towards the end of season that ruled him out and he returned home to Australia.

== Coaching ==
He served as player coach of Strathmore Split in 2016 during the State 4 North West Victorian men's competition. The same year, he earned a promotion to State 3. In 2019 and 2021, he earned double promotion to lead the club to State 1 Division.

In 2022 he joined Western Suburbs Soccer Club and in the same year earned another Promotion to State 1 Division.

In November 2024, he was hired as the senior men's coach for Strathmore Split.
