= Werribee City FC =

- Full name: Werribee City Football Club
- Nicknames: City, Bees
- Founded: 1969
- Ground: Galvin Park Reserve, Benlor Ground
- Capacity: 1000
- Chairman: Giovanni Inserra
- Coach: Sergio Sabbadini
- League: Victoria Premier League 2
- 2026: 12th of 14 (relegated)
- Website: www.werribeecityfc.com.au
Home colours	Away colours

Werribee City Football Club is an Australia semi-professional soccer club based in Werribee, Melbourne, currently playing in the Victoria Premier League 2 competition. The club plays its home games at Galvin Park Reserve (Benlor Ground), Werribee.

== National Premier Leagues Victoria ==
After the introduction of the National Premier Leagues Victoria, Werribee City were placed into the top division, the new top tier of football in the state. In the final game of the 2014 season, Port Melbourne SC scored a 95th minute goal, keeping both it and Werribee in the top division and relegating Ballarat City FC.

After a poor start to the 2015 season, with the Bees languishing in relegation places, manager Nino Ragusa was replaced and Tony Trifunov took over the reins. Trifunov's reign last just a few rounds, with the Bees then appointing Domenico Gangemi to finish off the 2015 season. Werribee City was relegated from the top flight of football in Victoria after a 13th-placed finish.

Ahead of the 2016 season, the Werribee squad underwent an overhaul, with a large portion of the 2015 squad departing the club upon the conclusion of the campaign. Werribee had a disastrous start to the season, managing just a single point in their first six games, losing Domenico Marafioti to a shoulder injury and bowing out of the 2016 FFA Cup at the first hurdle, losing 3–0 to Dandenong Thunder. This led to the departure of Gangemi, who resigned on 6 April 2016. Former Bulleen Lions manager Serge Sabbadini was appointed as the new Werribee City manager. The Bees then experienced an upturn in form; after picking up just two points in the opening 11 rounds, Werribee then collected five wins and four draws from its next 11 games to finish the season in 8th place.

The following season, Werribee again finished in 8th place finish in the NPL2 West competition. In 2018, Werribee finished in 5th place. For the 2019 season, Werribee finished in third place.

== Former players ==
- Hrvoje Matkovic
- Danny Tiatto
- Joe Spiteri
- Craig Moore
- Christopher Cristaldo
- Simon Colosimo
- Sabit Ngor

== Top goalscorers ==
Year	Name	Goals	League	Ref.
2010	Joe Spiteri	14	SL2NW	
2011	Marty Collins	12	SL2NW	
2012	Simon Zappia	16*	SL1	
2013	Leigh Minopoulos	15	SL1	
2014	Steven Cudrig	5	NPL	
2015	Christopher Cristaldo	4	NPL	
2016	Shaun Weaver	10	NPL2	
2017	Darcy Den Ouden	6	NPL2	
2018	Carlin Feely Trevor Ssemakula	8	NPL2	
2019	Jake Butler	14	NPL2	

- Denotes top goalscorer in the league

== Honours ==
- Provisional League Division Champions 1977
- Provisional League Cup Winners 1977
- Metro League Division 4 Champions 1980
- Promotion to Metro League Division 2 1981
- Promotion to Metro League Division 2 1982
- Victorian State League Cup Champions 1992
- Victorian Division 1 State League Champions 1993
- Provisional League Division 1 Champions 2004
- Moreland Charity Cup Winners 2006
- State League 3 Champions 2006
- State League 2 Runners-up 2007
- State League 2 Runners-up 2008
- State League 2 Champions 2011
- State League 1 Runners-up 2013

== Individual honours ==
- 2012 Simon Zappia League B&F 21 votes
- 2012 Simon Zappia League Top Goalscorer 16 Goals
