= David Munson =

David Munson could refer to:

- David Curtiss Munson (1884–1953), American track and field athlete
- Dave Munson (born 1942), American politician and former mayor of Sioux Falls, South Dakota
- David C. Munson, American electrical engineer and academic

== See also ==
- David Manson (disambiguation)
- David Monson (disambiguation)
