= Southern Mallee Thunder =

Names
- Full name: Southern Mallee Thunder Football Netball Club
- Nickname(s): Thunder

Club details
- Founded: 27 October 2023; 19 months ago
- Competition: Wimmera Football League

Uniforms
Historical

The Southern Mallee Thunder is an Australian rules football club that currently competes in the Wimmera Football Netball League (WFNL) in Victoria. The club was formed in 2023 as a merger of the Southern Mallee Giants and Jeparit-Rainbow.

== History ==
=== Southern Mallee Giants ===
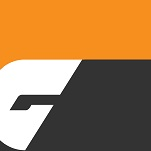
Colours of Southern Mallee Giants

The Southern Mallee Giants Football Club was formed in 2014 and was based in the towns of Hopetoun and Beulah.

The club was the result of a merger of the Hopetoun and the Beulah football clubs in 2014, and competed in the last year of the Mallee Football League (MFL) in 2015. The league was reduced to five clubs and was deemed uneconomical to continue, and the Giants were accepted into the Horsham District Football Netball League (HDFNL) for the 2016 season.

Southern Mallee won the 2016 and 2017 premierships, with a winning streak of 36 games over two years. However, the club was deemed too strong for the HDFNL and joined the Wimmera Football League in 2018.

The Giants made the 2023 seniors grand final, but were defeated by Ararat by 21 points.

=== Jeparit-Rainbow ===
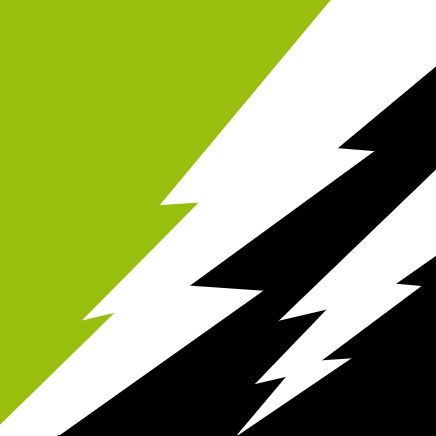
Colours of Jeparit-Rainbow

The Jeparit-Rainbow Football Club, nicknamed JR Storm and formerly Lakers, was formed in November 1995 from a merger of the Jeparit and Rainbow football clubs.

Jeparit-Rainbow joined the MFL in 1997, and the club won its first senior premiership the same year.

Following the 2014 season, Jeparit-Rainbow left the MFL and joined the Horsham & District Football League (HDFL). The club's nickname of "Lakers" was changed to "JR Storm", and the club's jumpers changed from blue, red and white to lime green, black and white.

=== Merger and new club ===
On 27 October 2023, the Giants and Jeparit-Rainbow formally merged to form Southern Mallee Thunder, with the new club to compete in the WFNL. The clubs decided to merge because due to struggles fielding junior teams, and low player numbers for senior teams.

The decision was finalised by members, with the options of "Thunder" or "Power" as the new club's nickname.
