= Corio Community Sports Club =

Australian rules football and netball club

Corio

Names
- Full name: Corio Community Sports Club Inc.
- Nickname: Devils

Club details
- Founded: 1974; 52 years ago
- Colours
- Competition: Geelong DFL
- Premierships: (1) 1995
- Ground: VIVA Energy Oval Shell Reserve

Uniforms
Home

The Corio Community Sports Club, nicknamed the Devils, is an Australian rules football and netball club based in the residential area of Corio, Victoria. The club teams currently compete in the Geelong DFL (with the football squad playing there since 1974).

== History ==
The Corio Football Club was born in 1974, and have competed in the Geelong DFL ever since. The club, known as the Devils, first made a GDFL grand final in 1979, which they lost. The Devils lost again in 1981. The 1990s has been the club's most successful era. It competed in three successive grand finals. After losing grand finals in 1992 and 1993, they finally won a first premiership in 1995. Corio has competed in seven grand finals, runners-up again in 2002 and 2004.

== Bibliography ==
- Cat Country: History of Football In The Geelong Region by John Stoward – ISBN 978-0-9577515-8-3
