= David Manson (footballer) =

Australian rules footballer

Personal information
- Full name: David Manson
- Born: 11 February 1951 (age 75)
- Original team: Geelong West

Playing career^{1}
| Years | Club | Games (Goals) |
| 1976 — 1978 | Geelong | 38 (13) |
- ^{1} Playing statistics correct to the end of 1978.

David Manson (born 11 February 1951) is a former Australian rules footballer who played for Geelong in the Victorian Football League (now known as the Australian Football League).
