= Airport West Football Club =

Names
- Full name: Airport West Football Club
- Nickname(s): Eagles

Club details
- Founded: 1961; 64 years ago
- Colours
- Competition: Essendon District Football League
- Premierships: 7 (1978, 1985, 1992, 1993, 2012, 2018, 2022)
- Ground(s): Hansen Reserve, Airport West

Uniforms
Home

Other information
- Official website: airportwestfc.com.au

Airport West Football Club is an Australian rules football club, located 14 km north west of Melbourne in the suburb of Airport West. Established in 1961, the club affiliated with the Essendon District Football League in 1962.

== History ==
The club's first senior premiership was in 1978 in the short-lived A3 Grade (from 1977 to 1985). The club won its B Grade premiership in 1985 and A Grade premierships in 1992 and 1993 coached by Des English.

== Senior Premierships (7) ==
A Grade

- 1992
- 1993

B Grade

- 1985

Division 1

- 2012
- 2018
- 2022

A3 Grade

- 1978

== Books ==
- History of football in Melbourne's north west - John Stoward - ISBN 9780980592924
