= Belmont Lions Sports Club =

Names
- Full name: Belmont Lions Sports Club
- Nickname: Lions

Club details
- Founded: 1965; 61 years ago
- Colours: Maroon blue Gold
- Competition: Geelong DFL since 1965
- Premierships: 1970, 2007.
- Ground: Winters Reserve, Belmont

Uniforms
Home	Away

Other information
- Official website: belmontlionssportsclub.com.au

The Belmont Lions Sports Club is an Australian rules football club which has competed in the Geelong DFL since 1965. They are based in the Geelong suburb of Belmont, Victoria.

== History ==
In 1965, a club located in Belmont was founded, under the name St Bernard's Football Club. It was admitted to the Geelong DFL Woolworth's Cup the same year. With a series of average performances in 1970, both the St Bernard's and Anglesea clubs were demoted to the reserve grade competition. St Bernard's won the premiership that year and both clubs advanced back into the senior grade in 1971.

After losing 41 games in a row from 1971 to the end of 1973, the club changed its name to East Belmont Football Club in 1974. East Belmont continued to struggle, so in 1984 it found itself in second division. In the lower division it regularly made the finals but was unable to triumph, often losing the preliminary finals.

After another 58-game losing streak, the club merged with a local junior club and became known the Belmont Lions Sports Club.

In 2000, the Geelong & District Football League added Netball to the league, which was embraced by the league.

They won the flag in 2007.

== Premierships ==
The only premierships were in 1970 and 2007.

== Sources ==
- Cat Country: History of Football in the Geelong District. Aussie Footy Books. 1 January 2008. ISBN 978-0-9577515-8-3.
