= Bannockburn Football & Netball Club =

Bannockburn

Names
- Full name: Bannockburn Football and Netball Club
- Nickname: Tigers

Club details
- Colours
- Competition: Geelong DFL
- Premierships: (8) 1925, 1931, 1990, 1997, 1998, 2003, 2019, 2022
- Ground: Moore Street

Uniforms
Home	Away

Other information
- Official website: bannockburnfnc.com.au

The Bannockburn Football and Netball Club is an Australian rules football and netball club based in the rural town of Bannockburn, 21 km north of Geelong, Victoria.

The club teams currently compete in the Geelong DFL since 1970.

== History ==
At the end of the WWI, the club was competing in the Leigh Cup competition until it disbanded in 1923. The club moved to the Mathison Cup in 1924, and then later the Elliott Cup. In 1953 the club moved to the Geelong & District Football league. Player shortage in 1956 forced a merger with neighbouring club Lethbridge, the merger lasted 3 years before Lethbridge went it alone before they too went into recess in 1962.

In 1970 the club reformed after having hiatus since the end of 1958. They were accepted into Woolworth Cup (2nd division) competition of the GDFL. The club had the occasional success in the 1970s as they were a middle-of-the-road club that would make the finals only to lose at the end of the season. Relegated to 2nd Division in 1984, the club lost the 1984 Grand final by 41 points. In 1985 they were minor premiers, only to crash out by losing both finals. In 1990 they won the Premiership by defeating Thomson by 52 points.

Promoted into 1st division the club went back to back in 1997 and 1998. A further premiership was won in 2003.

In 2019, as massive underdogs, they upset Thomson to win their first premiership in 16 years by 6 points.

== Premierships ==
- Mathieson Cup
  - 1925, 1931
- Geelong & District Football League
  - 1990, 1997, 1998, 2003, 2019, 2022

== VFL/AFL ==
- Peter Riccardi - Geelong
- Leigh Harding - North Melbourne
- Alan Woodman - Geelong
- James Worpel - Hawthorn

== Bibliography ==
- Cat Country: History of Football in the Geelong Region by John Stoward – ISBN 978-0-9577515-8-3
