= Warragul Industrials Football Club =

Warragul Industrials

Names
- Full name: Warragul Industrial Football Netball Club
- Nickname(s): Dusties

Club details
- Founded: 1948
- Colours: Blue Maroon
- Competition: West Gippsland Football Netball Competition
- Premierships: 1948, 1960, 1976, 1986, 1996
- Ground(s): Western Park

Warragul Industrials Football Club, nicknamed The Dusties, is an Australian rules football club in the West Gippsland Football Netball League. The club is based in the regional town of Warragul, in the Gippsland region of Victoria, Australia.

== History ==
After hostilities stopped when the Second World War the town of Warragul was hungry for the pursuit of sport, especially football. The town's main club Warragul Seagulls had over one hundred players wanting to play. While some resorted to finding clubs out of town the demand for a second town side was still there. A committee of enthusiastic people looked at establishing a working man football club from the workers at the local factories. In 1948 the club was admitted to the Ellinbank & District Football League before it had officially formed. One of the original committeemen was a past Fitzroy Football Club player so he was able to get a full set of jumpers.

It won the premiership in its first year. The Dusties had a dream start, contested the finals every year, including grand finals loses to Ellinbank in 1953 and 1954. In 1960 the club defeated Neerim Neerim South in the grand final to claim its second premiership. In the 1970s proved to be barren period as the club lost 51 games in a row. It won the flag in 1976 then again in 1986 and 1996. Recent seasons have been a struggle, although the side did at least manage a fleeting finals appearance in 2009.

In the 2018 AFL Gippsland League's review, Warragul Industrials were transferred to the West Gippsland Football Competition along with Tooradin-Dalmore (SEFNL) to make the league 12 teams.

== Premierships ==
Ellinbank & District Football League

- 1948, 1960, 1976, 1986, 1996

== Book ==
Dusties - The Warragul Industrial Football Club 50th anniversary 1948–1998
