= Anakie Football Club =

Australian rules football and netball club

Anakie

Names
- Full name: Anakie Football and Netball Club
- Nickname: Roos

Club details
- Founded: 1897; 129 years ago
- Colours
- Competition: Geelong District FL
- Premierships: (5): 1926, 1967, 1985, 1991, 1994
- Ground: Anakie Reserve; De Motts Rd Anakie

Uniforms
Home

Other information
- Official website: anakiefnc.com.au

The Anakie Football and Netball Club, nicknamed the Roos, is an Australian rules football and netball club based in the town of Anakie, 20 km north of Geelong, Victoria.

The Anakie teams currently compete in the Geelong DFL, with the football squad having entered in 1936 and netball in 2002.

== History ==
Club originated from the Durdidwarrah Football Club which was formed when the Geelong Water and Sewerage Trust constructed storage dams in the Brisbane ranges. Durdidwarrah were premiers in 1914 on completion of the dams works moved to the Anakie area.

After the end of WWI, the club was competing in the Leigh Cup competition until it disbanded in 1923. The club moved to the Mathison Cup in 1924, and then later the Elliott Cup. In 1936 the club moved to the Geelong Sub-District Football league. They were accepted into Woolworth Cup (2nd division) competition of the GDFL in 1949. The club had the occasional success in the 1960s as they were a middle-of-the-road club that would make the finals only to lose at the end of the season.

== Premierships ==
- Mathieson Cup (1):
  - 1926
- Geelong & District Football League (4):
  - 1967(Woolworth Cup), 1985 (Div 2 Seniors & Reserves), 1991(Div 1 Seniors & Reserves), 1994(Div 1 Seniors)
- Netball
  - 2013 (GDFNL B Grade)

== VFL/AFL players ==
- Eric Tucker - Geelong
- Neil Tucker - Geelong, Carlton

== Bibliography ==
- Cat Country: History of Football in the Geelong Region by John Stoward – ISBN 978-0-9577515-8-3
