= Thomson Football Club =

Football club

Thomson

Names
- Full name: Thomson Football and Netball Club
- Nickname: Tigers

Club details
- Founded: 1953; 73 years ago
- Colours
- Competition: Geelong District FL
- President: Chris Scott
- Coach: Paul Lynch
- Premierships: (11): 1964, 1983, 1986, 1991, 1995, 1996, 2005, 2006, 2008, 2018, 2024
- Ground: Thomson Recreation Reserve

Uniforms
Home

Other information
- Official website: thomsontigers.com.au

The Thomson Football Netball Club is an Australian rules football and netball club which has competed in the Geelong DFL since 1957. It is based in the Geelong suburb of Thomson.

== History ==
The Thomson Football Club was formed in 1953 by a group of local parents. The club would field a team in the local junior competition. Club meetings were held in the local Tate Street Primary School, the club would adopt the school colours of gold and purple for its jumper. First match games were played at Richmond Crescent, East Geelong. Part way through the 1956 season the club moved to the Godfrey Street oval. The club would develop the site by building change room is 1967 and then a social club complex in 1980.

In 1957 a senior team was admitted to the Geelong DFL. Initially in the Woolworth cup competition it moved to the more rural Jarman Cup division and stayed there before being promoted back to the Woolworths cup in 1963 and then winning the premiership in 1964.

== Premierships ==
League	Total flags	Premiership years
Geelong & District Football League	11	1964, 1983, 1986, 1991, 1995, 1996, 2005, 2006, 2008, 2018, 2024

== VFL/AFL players ==
- Larry Donohue – Geelong
- David Manson - Geelong
- Paul Jeffreys - Geelong

== Bibliography ==
- Cat Country: History of Football In The Geelong Region by John Stoward – ISBN 978-0-9577515-8-3
