= East Geelong Football Club =

East Geelong

Names
- Full name: East Geelong Football and Netball Club
- Nickname: Eagles

Club details
- Founded: 1879; 147 years ago
- Colours
- Competition: Geelong District FL
- President: Dan Payne
- Coach: Ned "Damage" Aulsebrook
- Premierships: (29)
- Ground: Richmond Oval, East Geelong

Uniforms
Home

Other information
- Official website: eastgeelongfnc.com.au

The East Geelong Football and Netball Club, nicknamed the Eagles, is an Australian rules football and netball club based in the Geelong suburb of East Geelong. The club teams currently compete in the Geelong & District Football League.

Since the club's formation in 1879, the club has been known as East Geelong (1879-1892, 1907-1979, 2000-present), Marylebone (1893-1906), and Eastern Suburbs (1980-1999).

In 1979, East Geelong were a founding club of the Geelong Football League, only to return to the Geelong & District Football League the following year.

== Premierships ==
League	Total flags	Premiership years
Geelong District Football Association	11	1893, 1902, 1904, 1905, 1907, 1908, 1910, 1911, 1912, 1913, 1914
Geelong & District Football League	18	1919, 1920, 1933, 1934, 1937, 1939, 1940, 1942, 1946, 1947, 1948, 1966, 1970, 1973, 1985, 1987, 1993, 2009
