= Werribee Centrals Sports Club =

Werribee Centrals

Names
- Full name: Werribee Centrals Sports Club
- Nickname: Centurians

Club details
- Founded: 1969; 56 years ago
- Colours
- Competition: Geelong District FL
- President: Chris Kopelke
- Coach: Rhyce Prismall
- Premierships: 1981, 1982, 1983 (WSFL); 1987, 1989, 1999, 2000, 2001, 2004 (GDFL)
- Ground: Galvin Park

Uniforms
Home

Other information
- Official website: werribeecentralssportsclub.com.au

The Werribee Centrals Sports Club is an Australian rules football and netball club based in the suburb of Werribee, Victoria. The club teams currently compete in the Geelong & District Football League, where the football squad joined in 1984.

== History ==
The club was formed as the "Werribee Centrals Sports & Youth Club Inc. Club" in 1969 after the amalgamation with the Werribee Football Club was disbanded. It was originally just a senior Football club which joined the now disbanded Western Suburbs League in 1970. Centrals colours at the time were the Black & Yellow Richmond colours.

After winning three consecutive premierships in first division in the Western Suburbs League the club moved to the Geelong & District Football League and play under the VCFL Banner. In the very first year after joining the Geelong Competition, Centrals won both Senior and Reserves Premierships in the GDFL Second Division. The club also changed its playing and club colours to Green and Gold. To complete the change the Centrals went from being the Tigers to the Centurions.

== Premierships ==
League	Total flags	Premiership years
Western Suburban Football League	3	1981, 1982, 1983
Geelong & District Football League	6	1987, 1989, 1999, 2000, 2001, 2004

== Bibliography ==
- Cat Country: History of Football In The Geelong Region by John Stoward – ISBN 978-0-9577515-8-3
