= Inverleigh Football Club =

Inverleigh

Names
- Full name: Inverleigh Football Netball Club
- Former name: Leigh Districts Football Club
- Nickname: Hawks

Club details
- Founded: 1970; 56 years ago
- Dissolved: 1995; 2002 (re-formed)
- Colours
- Competition: Geelong District FL
- President: David Haste
- Coach: Chris Moore
- Premierships: 1919, 1923, 1927, 1946, 1949, 1950, 1961, 1992, 2023
- Ground: Inverleigh Recreation Reserve

Uniforms
Home

Other information
- Official website: inverleighfnc.com.au

The Inverleigh Football Netball Club, nicknamed the Hawks, is an Australian rules football and netball club based in the rural township of Inverleigh, Victoria. From 1970 to 1995, the town was the base for the "Leigh Districts Football Club".

The football squad has competed in the Geelong DFL since its re-formation in 2002.

Inverleigh played in the Leigh District Football Association (1914–1925), Polwarth Football Association (1926), Matheson Trophy (1927–1935), Geelong Sub-District Football League (1936), Elliot Cup (1938–1952) and finally the Geelong & District Football League (1954-1995).

A merger in 1970 with Stonehaven formed the Leigh Districts Football Club.

The club reformed in 2002, now known as the Inverleigh Football Club. Initially, the club struggled to gain admission to the Geelong & District Football League. The club had to have at least 70 registered footballers, as well as field a netball team (despite the town not having any netball courts). In the 2016 season, Inverleigh finished third of twelve teams. Notable players to represent The Hawks include Michael “The Weapon” Allan. Michael received All Australian honours in 2019. Ryan Robertson is the only player to feature for both Inverleigh and Geelong Cats in the same season. He also Captained the Western Bulldogs to the 2016 AFL Premiership.

After losing grand finals in 2017, 2018 and 2022, the club finally succeeded with both Seniors and Reserves teams winning grand finals and breaking long standing droughts. The Reserves defeated East Geelong with the final score 7.9 (51) to 6.7 (43) which was the first Reserves grade premiership won since 1974, whilst the Seniors dominated from start to finish against their opponents Thomson to win their first seniors premiership since 1992, with the final score being 15.5 (95) to 4.8 (32). Jarrod Love won the medal for Best on Ground in the Seniors, whilst Jye McEwan was Best on Ground in the Reserves

== Premierships ==
=== Leigh Districts Football Club ===
League	Total flags	Premiership year(s)
Leigh District Football Association	3	1914, 1919, 1923
Mathieson Trophy	1	1927
Elliott Cup	4	1946, 1949, 1950, 1952
Geelong & District Football League	3	1961, 1992, 2023

== Bibliography ==
- Cat Country: History of Football In The Geelong Region by John Stoward – ISBN 978-0-9577515-8-3
