= Geelong & District Football Netball League =

Sports league in Victoria, Australia

- Formerly: Multiple names Geelong & District Football Association (1879–1918; 1939–1944); Geelong Junior Football Association (1922–1932); Geelong & District Football League (1919–1921; 1933–1938; 1945–2016)
- Sport: Australian rules football Netball
- Founded: 1879; 147 years ago
- President: Darryl Jarvis
- No. of teams: 12
- Country: Australia
- Headquarters: Breakwater, Victoria, Australia
- Confederation: AFL Barwon
- Most recent champion: East Geelong (2026)
- Most titles: Geelong West (26 premierships)
- Sponsor: Morris
- Related competitions: Geelong FNL; Bellarine FNL
- Website: gdfnl.com.au

The Geelong & District Football Netball League (GDFNL) is an Australian rules football and netball league in Victoria, being the oldest surviving competition in the region. It is one of three leagues in the Geelong area, the others being the Geelong FNL and the Bellarine FNL.

There are 12 teams competing in the GDFL, which has also produced over 600 VFL/AFL players.

== History ==
The league was formed in 1879 as the Geelong and District Football Association (GDFA). In 1919 it changed name to the GDFL, before changing to the Geelong Junior Football Association in 1922. It reverted to the GDFL name in 1933, then back to the GDFA in 1939, and back to the GDFL in 1945. From 1922 until 1927, the league operated and administrated the Geelong Association Football Club, which competed in the Victorian Football Association.

From 1946 onwards, the GDFL maintained a divisional system, with clubs in the First Division competing for the Evelyn Hurst Trophy, the Second Division for the Woolworth Cup, and the Third Division for the Jarman Cup.

In 1973 the GDFL had a restructure that insisted in having the senior club also provide a reserve grade side. This meant that senior clubs had to align with a junior club to survive. The Evelyn Hurst Trophy, the Woolworth Cup and the Jarman Cup titles were dropped for the more standard 1st and 2nd divisions. 1st division would have twelve clubs while 2nd division started with 8 and eventually grew to 11 clubs.

The league took the form it is today when 12 clubs broke away in 1979 to form the Geelong Football League. The city and country clubs of the old GDFL were divided into the major league competition of the GFL and the minor league GDFL. Many of the teams in the lower league wanted a system of promotion and relegation, which saw the movement of a couple of clubs.

The GDFL were left with 11 clubs but over the next couple of years it grew to fourteen. It was enough for the league add another division of competition. From 1984 until 1995 the league had two divisions that operated on a promotion/demotion system. From 1996 onwards, the league has reverted to a single division competition.

Today the GDFL is opposed to the promotion-relegation system, with the Geelong Football League, Geelong & District Football League and Bellarine Football League forming a three-league, three-division football structure in the Geelong area. From 2002, the GDFL included netball teams, introducing A Grade, B Grade & C Grade senior teams, as well as U/17's, U/15's & U/13's netball.

In 2009, the GDFL introduced a fourth senior netball section, D Grade, in which East Geelong and Werribee Centrals have each won three of the last six premierships.

== Clubs ==
=== Current clubs ===
| Club | Colours | Moniker | Home venue | Former league | Est. | Years in GDFNL | GDFNL premierships | |
| Club | Colours | Moniker | Home venue | Former league | Est. | Years in GDFNL | Total | Most recent |
|---|---|---|---|---|---|---|---|---|
| Anakie | | Roos | Anakie Reserve, Anakie | EC | c. 1897 | 1949- | 4 | 1994 |
| Bannockburn | | Tigers | Victoria Park, Bannockburn | EC | 1878 | 1953-1958, 1970- | 6 | 2022 |
| Bell Post Hill | | Panthers | Myers Reserve, Bell Post Hill | — | 1976 | 1977- | 7 | 2017 |
| Belmont Lions (St Bernards 1965-73, East Belmont 1974-97) | | Lions | Winter Reserve, Belmont | — | 1965 | 1965- | 1 | 2007 |
| Corio | | Devils | Shell Reserve, Corio | — | 1974 | 1974- | 1 | 1995 |
| East Geelong (Eastern Suburbs 1980-99) | | Eagles | Richmond Oval, East Geelong | GFL | 1879 | 1879-1978, 1980- | 25 | 2026 |
| Geelong West | | Giants | West Oval, Geelong West | — | 2017 | 2017- | 0 | — |
| Inverleigh (Leigh Districts 1970-95) | | Hawks | Inverleigh Recreation Reserve, Inverleigh | — | 1970 | 1954-1995, 2003- | 2 | 2023 |
| North Geelong | | Magpies | Osborne Park, North Geelong | GFL | 1876 | 1890-1978, 1983- | 22 | 2025 |
| Thomson | | Tigers | Thomson Recreation Reserve, Thomson | GFL | 1953 | 1957-1978, 1982-1983, 1985- | 11 | 2024 |
| Werribee Centrals | | Centurions | Galvin Park Reserve, Werribee | WSFL | 1969 | 1984- | 7 | 2004 |
| Winchelsea | | Blues | Eastern Reserve, Winchelsea | BFL | 1876 | 1921-1922, 2002- | 0 | — |

=== Former clubs ===
| Club | Colours | Moniker | Home venue | Former League | Est. | Years in competition | GDFNL premierships | | Fate |
| Club | Colours | Moniker | Home venue | Former League | Est. | Years in competition | Total | Most recent | Fate |
|---|---|---|---|---|---|---|---|---|---|
| Anglesea | | | Ellimatta Reserve, Anglesea | – | 1963 | 1963-1972 | 0 | - | Moved to Bellarine FNL after 1972 season |
| Bacchus Marsh | | Tigers | Maddingley Park, Maddingley | BFL | 1881 | 1931-1932 | 0 | - | Moved to Bacchus Marsh & Melton FA in 1933 |
| Barrabool | | | Ceres Reserve, [[Ceres, Victoria|Ceres]] | – | | 1919 | 0 | - | Moved to Leigh District FA in 1920 |
| Barwon | | Bulldogs | Highton Recreation Reserve, Highton | – | 1856 | 1913-1978 | 3 | 1967 | Moved to Geelong FNL following 1978 season |
| Barwon Heads-Ocean Grove | | Seagulls | Howard Harmer Reserve, Barwon Heads | FCDFA | 1922 | 1947-1970 | 0 | - | Moved to Bellarine FNL after 1970 season |
| Barwon Rowing Club | | | | GASFL | | 1923-1925 | 0 | - | Folded |
| Bell Park | | Dragons | Hamlyn Park, Bell Park | – | 1958 | 1959-1978 | 2 | 1970 | Moved to Geelong FNL following 1978 season |
| Belmont (Belmont-Highton 1969) | | Two Blues | McDonald Reserve, Belmont | GFA | 1874 | 1928-1929, 1945-1989 | 0 | - | Moved to Geelong Athletic Society FL in 1930. Merged with Barwon in 1990 to form South Barwon |
| Belmont Amateurs | | | | GFA | | 1939 | 0 | - | Folded partway through 1939 season |
| Chilwell | | Bombers | | – | 1874 | 1879-1933 | 0 | - | Merged with Newtown in 1934 to form Newtown & Chilwell |
| Colac Rovers | | Rovers | Colac Showgrounds, Colac | CFL | 1900s | 1936-1938 | 0 | - | Moved to Colac & District FL in 1939 |
| CYMS | | | | – | | 1946-1950 | 0 | - | Merged with YCW to form CYMS-YCW in 1951 |
| CYMS-YCW | | | | – | 1951 | 1951 | 0 | - | De-merged into CYMS and YCW in 1952 |
| Drysdale | | Hawks | Drysdale Recreational Reserve, Drysdale | GSDFL | 1879 | 1940-1970 | 4 | 1970 | Moved to Bellarine FNL after 1970 season |
| Ford | | | | | 1926 | 1926, 1936-1938 | 0 | - | Folded |
| Freshwater Creek | | Sparrows | | GFA | | 1939-1940, 1947-1961 | 2 | 1951 | Folded |
| Geelong Amateur | | Ammos, Pegasus | Queens Park, Highton | VAFA | 1926 | 1983-1994 | 2 | 1983 | Moved to Bellarine FNL after 1994 season |
| Geelong Guild Scouts | | | | | | 1933-1934 | 0 | - | Moved to Geelong FA in 1935 |
| Geelong High School Ex-Students | | | | GFA | | 1939 | 0 | - | Folded due to WWII |
| Geelong West | | Roosters | West Oval, Geelong West | – | 1878 | 1879-1945 | 25 | 1945 | Moved to Ballarat FL following 1945 season |
| Geelong West SC | | Cheetahs | West Oval, Geelong West | GFNL | 1926 | 1939-1978, 1986-2016 | 5 | 1987 | Played in Geelong FL between 1979-85. Merged with Geelong West-St Peter's in 2017 to form Geelong West |
| Geelong West YCW | | | | – | | 1955-1958 | 0 | - | Folded |
| Grovedale (Marshall-Grovedale 1956-69) | | Tigers | Burdoo Reserve, Grovedale | – | 1947 | 1946-1978 | 2 | 1977 | Moved to Geelong FNL following 1978 season |
| Herne Hill | | | | – | | 1947-1951 | 0 | - | Folded |
| International Harvester Club | | | | – | | 1945 | 0 | - | Folded |
| Lara | | Cats | Lara Recreation Reserve, Lara | WDFL | 1880 | 1907-1914, 1947-1988 | 4 | 1988 | Moved to Geelong FNL following 1988 season |
| Leopold | | Lions | Leopold Memorial Park, Leopold | – | 1955 | 1955-1964 | 0 | - | Moved to Polwarth FL after 1964 season |
| Lethbridge (Bannockburn-Lethbridge 1956-58) | | | Lethbridge Recreation Reserve, Lethbridge | EC | c.1890s | 1953-1962 | 0 | - | Folded |
| Little River (Little River-Avalon 1956-58) | | | Little River Recreation Reserve, Little River | WDFA | | 1953-1966 | 0 | - | Folded |
| Marnock Vale | | | | GFA | | 1939 | 0 | - | Folded due to WWII |
| Meredith | | Swans | Meredith Cricket & Recreation Reserve, Meredith | BBMFL | c.1890s | 1976-1980 | 0 | - | Folded |
| Military | | | | Q&BDFA | | 1923-1924, 1926-1927 | 0 | - | Returned to Queenscliff & Bellarine District FL in 1925, folded at an unknown date |
| Modewarre | | Warriors | Mt Moriac Recreation Reserve, Mount Moriac | EC | 1879 | 1951-1995 | 8 | 1994 | Moved to Bellarine FNL after 1995 season |
| Newtown | | Two Blues | Elderslie Reserve, Newtown | – | 1875 | 1879-1933 | 0 | - | Merged with Chilwell in 1934 to form Newtown & Chilwell |
| Newtown & Chilwell | | Eagles | Elderslie Reserve, Newtown | – | 1933 | 1934-1978 | 6 | 1978 | Moved to Geelong FNL following 1978 season |
| Norlane | | | | – | | 1957-1963 | 0 | - | Folded |
| North Shore | | Seagulls | Windsor Park, North Shore | GSDFL | 1927 | 1940-1978 | 3 | 1977 | Moved to Geelong FNL following 1978 season |
| Ocean Grove | (1964-67)(1968) | Grubbers, Swans | Shell Road Reserve, Ocean Grove | – | 1964 | 1964-1968 | 0 | - | Moved to Polwarth FL after 1968 season |
| Portarlington | | Demons | Portarlington Recreation Reserve, Portarlington | GFA | 1874 | 1945-1963 | 4 | 1959 | Moved to Polwarth FL after 1963 season |
| Queenscliff | | Barracoutas | Queenscliff Recreation Reserve, Queenscliff | GSDFL | 1884 | 1945-1956 | 0 | - | Moved to Polwarth FL after 1956 season |
| Sea Scouts (Barwon Sea Scouts 1935-40) | | | | GFA | | 1935-1947 | 1 | 1946 | Folded |
| St Albans | | Supersaints | St Albans Reserve, Thomson | – | 1880 | 1897-1978 | 6 | 1972 | Moved to Geelong FNL following 1978 season |
| St. Augustines | | | | GFA | c.1920s | 1939-1940 | 0 | - | Folded |
| St Joseph's | | Joeys | Herne Hill Reserve, Herne Hill | – | 1973 | 1973-1984 | 2 | 1984 | Moved to Geelong FNL following 1978 season |
| St Leonards | | Saints | St Leonards Lake Reserve, St Leonards | BFNL | 1985 | 1991-1995 | 0 | - | Folded |
| St Mary's | | Saints | Kardinia Park West, South Geelong | – | 1953 | 1953-1978 | 8 | 1975 | Moved to Geelong FNL following 1978 season |
| St Peter's | | Saints | Walker Oval, Herne Hill | – | c. 1950 | 1959-1978, 1980-1981 | 2 | 1981 | Moved to Geelong FNL following 1978 and 1981 seasons |
| Stonehaven | | Tigers | Stonehaven Recreation Reserve, Fyansford | EC | | 1953–1969 | 0 | - | Merged with Inverleigh in 1970 to form Leigh Districts |
| Torquay | | Tigers | Spring Creek Reserve, Torquay | – | 1952 | 1952-1963 | 3 | 1962 | Moved to Polwarth FL after 1963 season |
| Werribee | | | | W&BMDFA | | 1930, 1932-1936 | 0 | - | Moved to Werribee District FA after WWII |
| Wyndhamvale | | Falcons | Wyndham Vale South Reserve, Wyndham Vale | – | 1979 | 1987-1988 | 0 | - | Moved to Western Region FL following 1988 season |
| YCW | | | | – | | 1946-1950 | 1 | 1948 | Merged with CYMS to form CYMS-YCW in 1951. Merged with St Mary's in 1952 when CYMS split from previous merger. |

== List of premiers ==
=== First single-division era (1879–1945) ===
| Year | Premiers |
|---|---|
| 1879 | North Geelong |
| 1880 | Geelong West |
| 1881 | Geelong West |
| 1882 | Geelong West |
| 1883 | North Geelong |
| 1884 | Geelong West |
| 1885 | Geelong West |
| 1886 | Barwon |
| 1887 | Geelong West |
| 1888 | Barwon |
| 1889 | Geelong West |
| 1890 | Geelong West |
| 1891 | West End |
| 1892 | Geelong West |
| 1893 | East Geelong |
| 1894 | Geelong West |
| 1895 | Marylebone |
| 1896 | Geelong West |
| 1897 | Newtown |
| 1898 | Newtown |
| 1899 | Newtown |
| 1900 | Newtown |
| 1901 | Barwon |
| 1902 | East Geelong |
| 1903 | Chilwell |
| 1904 | East Geelong |
| 1905 | East Geelong |
| 1906 | Barwon |
| 1907 | East Geelong |
| 1908 | East Geelong |
| 1909 | Geelong West |
| 1910 | Newtown |
| 1911 | East Geelong |
| 1912 | East Geelong |
| 1913 | East Geelong |
| 1914 | Geelong West |
| 1915 | Chilwell |
| 1916 | |
| 1917 | |
| 1918 | Geelong West |
| 1919 | East Geelong |
| 1920 | East Geelong |
| 1921 | Barwon |
| 1922 | Chilwell |
| 1923 | Chilwell |
| 1924 | Barwon |
| 1925 | North Geelong |
| 1926 | Barwon |
| 1927 | Geelong West |
| 1928 | Barwon |
| 1929 | Queenscliff |
| 1930 | North Geelong |
| 1931 | Geelong West |
| 1932 | Geelong West |
| 1933 | Geelong West |
| 1934 | Geelong West |
| 1935 | Geelong West |
| 1936 | Geelong West |
| 1937 | Newtown & Chilwell |
| 1938 | Geelong West |
| 1939 | East Geelong |
| 1940 | East Geelong |
| 1941 | Geelong West |
| 1942 | Season cancelled |
| 1943 | Season cancelled |
| 1944 | Geelong West |
| 1945 | Geelong West |

=== Multi-division era (1946–1995) ===
| Year | Premiers | | | |
| Year | Division 1 (Note: From 1946 to 1972, the first division competition was known as the Evelyn Hurst Trophy.) | Division 2 (Note: From 1946 to 1972, the second division competition was known as the Woolworths Cup.) | Division 3 (Note: For the life of its existence (1948 to 1972), the third division competition was known as the Jarman Cup.) | Division 4 (Note: For the life of its existence (1963 to 1964), the fourth division competition was known as the Bancroft Cup.) |
|---|---|---|---|---|
| 1946 | East Geelong | Sea Scouts | Two-division competition | |
| 1947 | East Geelong | Portarlington | Two-division competition | |
| 1948 | East Geelong | North Shore | Geelong YCW | Three-division competition |
| 1949 | North Geelong | St Albans | North Geelong Seconds | Three-division competition |
| 1950 | North Geelong | Freshwater Creek | Two-division competition | |
| 1951 | North Geelong | Freshwater Creek | Two-division competition | |
| 1952 | North Geelong | Lara | Modewarre | Three-division competition |
| 1953 | North Geelong | Geelong Amateur | Portarlington | Three-division competition |
| 1954 | North Geelong | St Albans | Modewarre | Three-division competition |
| 1955 | North Geelong | North Geelong Seconds | Drysdale | Three-division competition |
| 1956 | St Mary's | North Geelong Seconds | Geelong West C&FC | Three-division competition |
| 1957 | Barwon | North Geelong Seconds | Barwon Heads–Ocean Grove | Three-division competition |
| 1958 | North Geelong | North Geelong Seconds | Portarlington | Three-division competition |
| 1959 | St Mary's | North Geelong Seconds | Portarlington | Three-division competition |
| 1960 | St Mary's | Modewarre | Torquay | Three-division competition |
| 1961 | Barwon | Inverleigh | Torquay | Three-division competition |
| 1962 | Newtown & Chilwell | Torquay | Drysdale | Three-division competition |
| 1963 | Newtown & Chilwell | Drysdale | Marshall–Grovedale | North Geelong Reserves |
| 1964 | Newtown & Chilwell | Thomson | St Albans | St Mary's Reserves |
| 1965 | Newtown & Chilwell | Lara | Newtown & Chilwell Reserves | Three-division competition |
| 1966 | Geelong West C&FC | Drysdale | East Geelong Reserves | Three-division competition |
| 1967 | St Mary's | Anakie | Barwon | Three-division competition |
| 1968 | North Geelong | St Albans | St Mary's Reserves | Three-division competition |
| 1969 | North Geelong | Drysdale | Bell Park Reserves | Three-division competition |
| 1970 | East Geelong | Drysdale | Bell Park Reserves | Three-division competition |
| 1971 | Geelong West C&FC | St Albans | Newtown & Chilwell Reserves | Three-division competition |
| 1972 | St Mary's | St Albans | St Mary's Reserves | Three-division competition |
| 1973 | East Geelong | Modewarre | Two-division competition | |
| 1974 | North Shore | Modewarre | Two-division competition | |
| 1975 | St Mary's | Grovedale | Two-division competition | |
| 1976 | North Shore | Modewarre | Two-division competition | |
| 1977 | North Shore | Grovedale | Two-division competition | |
| 1978 | Newtown & Chilwell | Geelong West C&FC | Two-division competition | |
| 1979 | Modewarre | Single-division competition | | |
| 1980 | St Peter's | Single-division competition | | |
| 1981 | St Peter's | Single-division competition | | |
| 1982 | St Joseph's | Single-division competition | | |
| 1983 | Thomson | Single-division competition | | |
| 1984 | St Joseph's | Werribee Centrals | Two-division competition | |
| 1985 | Geelong Amateur | Anakie | Two-division competition | |
| 1986 | Lara | Thomson | Two-division competition | |
| 1987 | Werribee Centrals | Geelong West C&FC | Two-division competition | |
| 1988 | Lara | North Geelong | Two-division competition | |
| 1989 | Werribee Centrals | Modewarre | Two-division competition | |
| 1990 | North Geelong | Bannockburn | Two-division competition | |
| 1991 | Anakie | Thomson | Two-division competition | |
| 1992 | North Geelong | Leigh Districts | Two-division competition | |
| 1993 | North Geelong | Eastern Suburbs | Two-division competition | |
| 1994 | Anakie | Modewarre | Two-division competition | |
| 1995 | Corio | Thomson | Two-division competition | |

=== Second single-division era (1996–present) ===
| Year | Premiers |
|---|---|
| 1996 | Thomson |
| 1997 | Bannockburn |
| 1998 | Bannockburn |
| 1999 | Werribee Centrals |
| 2000 | Werribee Centrals |
| 2001 | Werribee Centrals |
| 2002 | North Geelong |
| 2003 | Bannockburn |
| 2004 | Werribee Centrals |
| 2005 | Thomson |
| 2006 | Thomson |
| 2007 | Belmont Lions |
| 2008 | Thomson |
| 2009 | East Geelong |
| 2010 | Bell Post Hill |
| 2011 | Bell Post Hill |
| 2012 | Bell Post Hill |
| 2013 | North Geelong |
| 2014 | Bell Post Hill |
| 2015 | Bell Post Hill |
| 2016 | Bell Post Hill |
| 2017 | Bell Post Hill |
| 2018 | Thomson |
| 2019 | Bannockburn |
| 2020 | Season cancelled |
| 2021 | Season curtailed |
| 2022 | Bannockburn |
| 2023 | Inverleigh |
| 2024 | Thomson |
| 2025 | North Geelong |
| 2026 | East Geelong |
