= West Gippsland Football Netball Competition =

Australian rules football and netball league

- Founded: 2017; 9 years ago
- No. of teams: 11
- State: Victoria
- Region: West Gippsland
- Current premiers (2026): Nar Nar Goon (3rd premiership)
- Most premierships: Nar Nar Goon (3)
- Official website: wgfnc.org.au

The West Gippsland Football Netball Competition (WGFNC) is an Australian rules football and netball competition based in the West Gippsland region of Victoria, Australia. The competition was formed in 2017 as part of the AFL Gippsland Senior Football Leagues Review of 2015–16.

The inaugural competition comprised ten clubs and expanded to twelve in 2019 with the admission of Tooradin-Dalmore and Warragul Industrials. Bunyip returned to the Ellinbank & District Football Netball League for the 2025 season, leaving West Gippsland with eleven clubs.

The competition conducts four grades of football — seniors, reserves, under-18 and under-16 — and eight grades of netball: A Grade, B Grade, C Grade, D Grade, 17 & Under, 15 & Under, 13 & Under and 11 & Under.

The competition is distinct from the former West Gippsland Football League, which merged administratively with the Gippsland Latrobe Football League at the end of 2001 to form the West Gippsland Latrobe Football League.

== History ==
=== Formation ===
The West Gippsland Football Netball Competition was established as part of the AFL Gippsland Senior Football Leagues Review conducted during 2015 and 2016. The review resulted in significant changes to senior football and netball competition structures across Gippsland, with the new West Gippsland competition commencing in 2017. The competition was officially launched on 17 December 2016.

The inaugural competition comprised ten clubs. Five transferred from the Ellinbank & District Football League — Bunyip, Cora Lynn, Garfield, Koo Wee Rup and Nar Nar Goon — while Dalyston, Inverloch-Kongwak, Kilcunda-Bass, Korumburra-Bena and Phillip Island joined from the Alberton Football Netball League.

Inverloch-Kongwak won the inaugural senior football premiership in 2017. Phillip Island subsequently won consecutive senior premierships in 2018 and 2019.

=== Expansion ===
The competition expanded from ten to twelve clubs for the 2019 season with the admission of Tooradin-Dalmore and Warragul Industrials. Their inclusion followed the 2018 AFL Gippsland Leagues and Competitions Review, which recommended that both clubs join West Gippsland from 2019.

Tooradin-Dalmore had previously competed in the South East Football Netball League, while Warragul Industrials transferred from the Ellinbank & District competition.

=== COVID-19 interruptions ===
The 2020 football and netball season was abandoned because of restrictions associated with the COVID-19 pandemic. Plans to conduct modified junior competitions were also abandoned after further restrictions were introduced.

Competition resumed in 2021, but the season was again affected by COVID-19 restrictions. The remainder of the season, including the finals series, was abandoned in September. Teams that finished on top of their respective ladders were recognised as minor premiers, but no premierships were awarded.

The league held its first completed finals series since 2019 in 2022.

=== Recent changes ===
Bunyip left the competition following the 2024 season and returned to the Ellinbank & District Football Netball League in 2025, reducing West Gippsland to eleven clubs.

In 2025, Drouin sought approval to transfer from the Gippsland League to West Gippsland for the 2026 season. West Gippsland's member clubs approved Drouin's application, but AFL Gippsland subsequently upheld an appeal against the transfer, leaving Drouin in the Gippsland League for 2026.

== Clubs ==
=== Current clubs ===
Club	Colours	Moniker	Home venue	Former league	Formed	Years in WGFNL	WGFNL senior premierships	
Club	Colours	Moniker	Home venue	Former league	Formed	Years in WGFNL	Total	Years
Cora Lynn		Cobras	Cora Lynn Recreation Reserve, Cora Lynn	EDFL	1913	2017-	0	—
Dalyston		Magpies	Dalyston Recreation Reserve, Dalyston	AFNL	1898	2017-	0	—
Garfield		Stars	Garfield Recreation Reserve, Garfield	EDFL	1935	2017-	0	—
Inverloch Kongwak		Sea Eagles	Inverloch Recreation Reserve, Inverloch	AFNL	1957	2017-	2	2017, 2023
Kilcunda Bass		Panthers	Bass Recreation Reserve, Bass	AFNL	1957	2017-	0	—
Koo Wee Rup		Demons	Koo Wee Rup Recreation Reserve, Koo Wee Rup	EDFL	c.1900	2017-	0	—
Korumburra Bena		Giants	Korumburra Showgrounds, Korumburra	AFNL	2001	2017-	0	—
Nar Nar Goon		Goons	Nar Nar Goon Recreation Reserve, Nar Nar Goon	EDFL	c.1900	2017-	3	2024, 2025, 2026
Phillip Island		Bulldogs	Cowes Recreation Reserve, Cowes	AFNL	1932	2017-	2	2018, 2019
Tooradin Dalmore		Seagulls	Tooradin Recreation Reserve, Tooradin	SEFNL	1922	2019-	1	2022
Warragul Industrials		Dusties	Western Park Reserve, Warragul	EDFL	1948	2019-	0	—

=== Former clubs ===
Club	Colours	Moniker	Home venue	Former league	Formed	Years in WGFNL	WGFNL senior premierships		Fate
Club	Colours	Moniker	Home venue	Former league	Formed	Years in WGFNL	Total	Years	Fate
Bunyip		Bulldogs	Bunyip Showgrounds, Bunyip	EDFL	1879	2017−2024	0	—	Returned to Ellinbank & District FNL in 2025

== Premiers ==
=== Seniors ===
Year	Premiers		Runners-up		Venue	Date	Ref
Year	Club	Score	Club	Score	Venue	Date	Ref
2017	Inverloch-Kongwak (1)	15.18 (162)	Cora Lynn (1)	4.7 (31)	Wonthaggi Recreation Reserve	16 September 2017	
2018	Phillip Island (1)	14.18 (102)	Koo Wee Rup (1)	0.3 (3)	Garfield Recreation Reserve	15 September 2018	
2019	Phillip Island (2)	9.11 (65)	Cora Lynn (2)	9.7 (61)	Garfield Recreation Reserve	7 September 2019	
2020	Season not contested due to the COVID-19 pandemic						
2021	Premiership not awarded due to the COVID-19 pandemic						
2022	Tooradin-Dalmore (1)	13.10 (88)	Phillip Island (1)	6.6 (42)	Garfield Recreation Reserve	10 September 2022	
2023	Inverloch-Kongwak (2)	10.15 (75)	Phillip Island (2)	6.4 (40)	Koo Wee Rup Recreation Reserve	16 September 2023	
2024	Nar Nar Goon (1)	14.3 (87)	Phillip Island (3)	10.3 (63)	Garfield Recreation Reserve	14 September 2024	
2025	Nar Nar Goon (2)	9.11 (65)	Tooradin-Dalmore (1)	6.8 (44)	Garfield Recreation Reserve	20 September 2025	
2026	Nar Nar Goon (3)	10.9 (69)	Phillip Island (4)	8.7 (55)	Garfield Recreation Reserve	19 September 2026	

=== Reserves ===
Year	Premiers		Runners-up		Venue	Date	Ref
Year	Club	Score	Club	Score	Venue	Date	Ref
2017	Koo Wee Rup (1)	6.3 (39)	Phillip Island (1)	3.7 (25)	Wonthaggi Recreation Reserve	16 September 2017	
2018	Koo Wee Rup (2)	8.3 (51)	Inverloch-Kongwak (1)	2.1 (13)			
2019	Tooradin-Dalmore (1)	4.7 (31)	Koo Wee Rup (1)	4.3 (27)			
2020	Season not contested due to the COVID-19 pandemic						
2021	Premiership not awarded due to the COVID-19 pandemic						
2022	Tooradin-Dalmore (2)	14.4 (88)	Koo Wee Rup (2)	6.4 (40)			
2023	Inverloch-Kongwak (1)	9.8 (62)	Tooradin-Dalmore (1)	1.9 (15)			
2024	Nar Nar Goon (1)	7.6 (48)	Tooradin-Dalmore (2)	6.6 (42			
2025	Tooradin-Dalmore (3)	10.9 (69)	Nar Nar Goon (1)	2.3 (15)			
2026	Phillip Island (1)	10.10 (70)	Cora Lynn (1)	2.5 (17)			

=== Thirds ===
Year	Premiers		Runners-up		Venue	Date	Ref
Year	Club	Score	Club	Score	Venue	Date	Ref
2017	Garfield (1)	3.5 (23)	Cora Lynn (1)	3.1 (19)	Wonthaggi Recreation Reserve	16 September 2017	
2018	Phillip Island (1)	3.8 (26)	Cora Lynn (2)	1.6 (12)			
2019	Phillip Island (2)	4.3 (27)	Inverloch-Kongwak (1)	2.6 (18)			
2020	Season not contested due to the COVID-19 pandemic						
2021	Premiership not awarded due to the COVID-19 pandemic						
2022	Inverloch-Kongwak (1)	4.7 (31)	Garfield (1)	3.2 (20)			
2023	Inverloch-Kongwak (2)	5.6 (36)	Phillip Island (1)	1.7 (13)			
2024	Phillip Island (3)	3.6 (24)	Warragul Industrials (1)	2.5 (17)			
2025	Phillip Island (4)	7.8 (50)	Inverloch-Kongwak (2)	1.2 (8)			
2026	Tooradin-Dalmore (1)	7.8 (50)	Inverloch-Kongwak (3)	2.5 (17)			

=== Fourths ===
Year	Premiers		Runners-up		Venue	Date	Ref
Year	Club	Score	Club	Score	Venue	Date	Ref
2017	Bunyip (1)	2.9 (21)	Phillip Island (1)	3.0 (18)	Wonthaggi Recreation Reserve	16 September 2017	
2018	Koo Wee Rup (1)	4.3 (27)	Inverloch-Kongwak (1)	2.5 (17)			
2019	Phillip Island (1)	4.4 (28)	Nar Nar Goon (1)	2.3 (15)			
2020	Season not contested due to the COVID-19 pandemic						
2021	Premiership not awarded due to the COVID-19 pandemic						
2022	Phillip Island (2)	7.8 (50)	Inverloch-Kongwak (2)	3.0 (18)			
2023	Phillip Island (3)	8.6 (54)	Warragul Industrials (1)	4.3 (27)			
2024	Warragul Industrials (1)	4.8 (32)	Phillip Island (2)	3.1 (19)			
2025	Warragul Industrials (2)	8.12 (60)	Inverloch-Kongwak (3)	3.5 (23)			
2026	Inverloch-Kongwak (1)	10.7 (67)	Inverloch-Kongwak (2)	2.2 (14)			

== Season Structure ==
=== Pre-season ===
The West Gippsland Football Netball Competition like most country leagues does not have a formal Pre-season competition. As part of their Pre-season preparation clubs will often schedule between one and two practice matches with clubs from other leagues prior to the season beginning. These matches could take on different structures and were primarily conducted on a non-official basis with limited match officials and scores not being recorded.

=== Premiership season ===
The West Gippsland home-and-away season lasts for 18 rounds, starting in mid April and ending in mid August. As of the 2017 season, each team plays 18 matches. Teams receive four premiership points for a win and two premiership points for a draw. Ladder finishing positions are based on the number of premiership points won, and "percentage" (calculated as the ratio of points scored to points conceded throughout the season) is used as a tie-breaker when teams finish with equal premiership points.

=== Finals series ===
Since its inception until 2017 the West Gippsland finals have consisted of a 'Top-5' finals system.

The top five teams at the end of the West Gippsland home & away season compete in a four-week finals series throughout August, culminating in a grand final to determine the premiers. The finals series is played under the 'Top-5' Page playoff system, and the grand final is played on the afternoon of the last Saturday in August or the first Saturday of September.

The winning team receives a silver premiership cup, a premiership flag – a new one of each is manufactured each year. The flag has been presented since the league began and is traditionally unfurled at the team's first home game of the following season. Additionally, each player in the grand final-winning team receives a premiership medallion.

In 2020 it was decided that the finals system would expand to a 'Top-6'.

==== 2019 Finals series ====
Week One
First Semi-Final at Koo Wee Rup
2	Cora Lynn	8.6 (54)
3	Tooradin-Dalmore	13.18 (96)
Second Elimination Final at Cora Lynn
4	Inverloch-Kongwak	5.17 (47)
5	Koo Wee Rup	11.10 (76)

Week Two
Second Semi-Final at Bass
1	Phillip Island	7.16 (58)
Tooradin-Dalmore	5.4 (34)
First Semi-Final at Korumburra
Cora Lynn	17.19 (121)
Koo Wee Rup	9.7 (61)

Week Three
Preliminary Final at Koo Wee Rup
Tooradin-Dalmore	7.9 (51)
Cora Lynn	15.11 (101)

Week Four
Grand Final at Garfield
Phillip Island	9.11 (65)
Cora Lynn	9.7 (61)

== Awards ==
The following major individual awards and accolades are presented each season:

- Best & fairest award — to the fairest and best player in the league, voted by the umpires
- Leading goal kicker award — for the player who scores the most goals during the home & away season
- AFL Victoria Country Medal — the best player on the ground in the Grand Final
- Team of the year — a squad of 24 players deemed the best in their positions
- Most disciplined club award — for the club who receives the most discipline points, voted by the umpires

=== Team of the Year ===
2019 WGFNC Team of the Year
B:	Mark Griffin (Phillip Island)	Mitchell Wallace (Cora Lynn)	Lewis Rankin (Inverloch-Kongwak)
HB:	Nathan Muratore (Koo Wee Rup)	Jason Tomada (Phillip Island)	Luke Walker (Koo Wee Rup)
C:	Jaymie Youle (Phillip Island)	Trent Armour (Nar Nar Goon)	Tanner Stanton (Garfield)
HF:	Nathan Langley (Cora Lynn)	Sam Gibbins (Inverloch-Kongwak)	Julian Suarez (Tooradin-Dalmore)
F:	Andrew Dean (Tooradin-Dalmore)	Nathan Gardiner (Cora Lynn)	Jason Wells (Koo Wee Rup)
Foll:	Cameron Pedersen (Phillip Island) Vice-Captain	Brendan Kimber (Phillip Island) Captain	Tyson Bale (Warragul Industrials)
Int:	Zak Vernon (Phillip Island)	Joel Gibson (Koo Wee Rup)	Nathan Voss (Koo Wee Rup)
Int:	Kris Sabbatucci (Tooradin-Dalmore)	Chris Johnson (Cora Lynn)	Jeb McLeod (Bunyip)
Coach:	Beau Vernon (Phillip Island)		

=== Award winners ===
Best & Fairest
Year	Winner	Club	Votes
2023	Dale Gawley	Kilcunda Bass	28
2022	Brent Macaffer	Tooradin-Dalmore	25
2019	Cameron Pedersen	Phillip Island	38
2018	Brendan Kimber	Phillip Island	24
2017	Andrew Soumilas	Inverloch-Kongwak	31

Leading Goal Kicker
Year	Winner	Club	Goals
2024	Nathan Gardiner	Cora Lynn	101
2023	Nathan Gardiner	Cora Lynn	103
2022	Nathan Gardiner	Cora Lynn	78
2021	Nathan Gardiner	Cora Lynn	50
2019	Nathan Gardiner	Cora Lynn	73
2018	Jason Wells	Koo Wee Rup	79
2017	Nathan Langley	Cora Lynn	68

== 2017 Ladder ==
West Gippsland	Wins	Losses	Draws	For	Against	%	Pts
Inverloch Kongwak	14	3	1	1767	1066	165.76%	58
Cora Lynn	14	4	0	1796	1249	143.80%	56
Dalyston	13	4	1	1667	1187	140.44%	54
Nar Nar Goon	10	8	0	1322	1196	110.54%	40
Phillip Island	10	8	0	1303	1220	106.80%	40
Koo Wee Rup	10	8	0	1294	1265	102.29%	40
Kilcunda Bass	9	9	0	1243	1245	99.84%	36
Garfield	5	13	0	1155	1449	79.71%	20
Bunyip	3	15	0	987	1724	57.25%	12
Korumburra-Bena	1	17	0	801	1734	46.19%	4

=== 2017 Finals series ===
Week One
Qualifying Final at Koo Wee Rup
2	Cora Lynn	19.10 (124)
3	Dalyston	10.9 (69)
Elimination Final at Inverloch
4	Nar Nar Goon	2.9 (21)
5	Phillip Island	14.10 (94)

Week Two
Second Semi-Final at Nar Nar Goon
1	Inverloch-Kongwak	12.23 (95)
Cora Lynn	13.11 (89)
First Semi-Final at Inverloch
Dalyston	9.9 (63)
Phillip Island	13.9 (87)

Week Three
Preliminary Final at Garfield
Cora Lynn	18.8 (116)
Phillip Island	4.3 (27)

Week Four
Grand Final at Wonthaggi
Inverloch-Kongwak	18.18 (126)
Cora Lynn	4.7 (31)

== 2018 Ladder ==
West Gippsland	Wins	Losses	Draws	For	Against	%	Pts
Phillip Island	14	4	0	1759	905	194.36%	56
Nar Nar Goon	14	4	0	1696	915	185.36%	56
Koo Wee Rup	14	4	0	1764	964	182.99%	56
Inverloch Kongwak	14	4	0	1577	924	170.67%	56
Cora Lynn	11	7	0	1525	1197	127.40%	44
Garfield	10	8	0	1352	1200	112.67%	40
Korumburra-Bena	5	13	0	941	1275	73.80%	20
Bunyip	4	14	0	1027	1655	62.05%	16
Kilcunda Bass	2	16	0	728	1877	38.79%	8
Dalyston	2	16	0	724	2181	33.20%	8

=== 2018 Finals series ===
Week One
Qualifying Final at Koo Wee Rup
2	Nar Nar Goon	10.6 (46)
3	Koo Wee Rup	17.11 (113)
Elimination Final at Inverloch
4	Inverloch-Kongwak	4.14 (38)
5	Cora Lynn	6.9 (45)

Week Two
Second Semi-Final at Cora Lynn
1	Phillip Island	14.14 (98)
Koo Wee Rup	5.8 (38)
First Semi-Final at Koo Wee Rup
Nar Nar Goon	16.13 (109)
Cora Lynn	6.14 (50)

Week Three
Preliminary Final at Garfield
Koo Wee Rup	10.9 (69)
Nar Nar Goon	7.17 (59)

Week Four
Grand Final at Garfield
Phillip Island	14.18 (102)
Koo Wee Rup	0.3 (3)

== 2019 Ladder ==
West Gippsland	Wins	Byes	Losses	Draws	For	Against	%	Pts
Phillip Island	17	0	0	1	1966	697	282.07%	70
Cora Lynn	15	0	2	1	1779	977	182.09%	62
Tooradin Dalmore	12	0	5	1	1627	1145	142.10%	50
Inverloch Kongwak	12	0	6	0	1618	977	165.61%	48
Koo Wee Rup	10	1	7	0	1517	1313	115.54%	44
Bunyip	11	0	7	0	1170	1016	115.16%	44
Nar Nar Goon	10	0	8	0	1287	1146	112.30%	40
Garfield	7	0	10	1	945	1057	89.40%	30
Korumburra-Bena	4	0	14	0	839	1496	56.08%	16
Kilcunda Bass	3	0	15	0	765	1831	41.78%	12
Dalyston	2	1	15	0	747	1669	44.76%	8
Warragul Industrials	2	0	16	0	699	1635	42.75%	8

=== 2019 Finals series ===
Week One
First Semi-Final at Koo Wee Rup
2	Cora Lynn	8.6 (54)
3	Tooradin-Dalmore	13.18 (96)
Second Elimination Final at Cora Lynn
4	Inverloch-Kongwak	5.17 (47)
5	Koo Wee Rup	11.10 (76)

Week Two
Second Semi-Final at Bass
1	Phillip Island	7.16 (58)
Tooradin-Dalmore	5.4 (34)
First Semi-Final at Korumburra
Cora Lynn	17.19 (121)
Koo Wee Rup	9.7 (61)

Week Three
Preliminary Final at Koo Wee Rup
Tooradin-Dalmore	7.9 (51)
Cora Lynn	15.11 (101)

Week Four
Grand Final at Garfield
Phillip Island	9.11 (65)
Cora Lynn	9.7 (61)

== 2022 Ladder ==
West Gippsland	Wins	Losses	Draws	For	Against	%	Pts
Tooradin-Dalmore	17	1	0	2078	779	266.75%	68
Phillip Island	16	2	0	1970	889	221.60%	64
Inverloch-Kongwak	14	4	0	1713	967	177.15%	56
Nar Nar Goon	13	5	0	1680	964	174.27%	52
Cora Lynn	12	6	0	1580	1114	141.83%	48
Warragul Industrials	10	8	0	1428	1163	122.79%	40
Bunyip	8	10	0	1190	1278	93.11%	32
Koo Wee Rup	7	11	0	1297	1568	82.72%	28
Kilcunda Bass	7	11	0	970	1522	63.73%	28
Dalyston	2	16	0	818	1906	42.92%	8
Garfield	1	17	0	757	1890	40.05%	4
Korumburra-Bena	1	17	0	705	2146	32.85%	4

=== 2022 Finals series ===
Week One
First Elimination Final at Bass
3	Inverloch-Kongwak	6.11 (47)
6	Warragul Industrials	9.7 (61)
Second Elimination Final at Garfield
4	Nar Nar Goon	7.13 (55)
5	Cora Lynn	11.6 (72)

Week Two
Second Semi-Final at Inverloch
1	Tooradin-Dalmore	13.4 (82)
2	Phillip Island	6.9 (45)
First Semi-Final at Cora Lynn
Warragul Industrials	7.4 (46)
Cora Lynn	4.7 (31)

Week Three
Preliminary Final at Dalyston
Phillip Island	7.12 (54)
Warragul Industrials	7.10 (52)

Week Four
Grand Final at Garfield
Tooradin-Dalmore	13.10 (88)
Phillip Island	6.6 (42)

== 2023 Ladder ==
West Gippsland	Wins	Losses	Draws	For	Against	%	Pts
Inverloch-Kongwak	16	1	1	1795	606	296.92%	66
Phillip Island	13	3	2	1979	906	218.43%	56
Tooradin Dalmore	14	4	0	1675	918	182.46%	56
Nar Nar Goon	13	4	1	1900	844	225.12%	54
Cora Lynn	12	6	0	1552	1148	135.19%	48
Warragul Industrials	11	7	0	1458	1060	137.55%	44
Dalyston	8	10	0	1261	1563	80.68%	32
Kilcunda Bass	7	11	0	1216	1538	79.06%	28
Koo Wee Rup	5	13	0	1174	1405	83.56%	20
Garfield	4	14	0	970	1679	57.77%	16
Korumburra-Bena	3	15	0	684	2109	32.43%	12
Bunyip	0	18	0	546	2434	22.43%	0

=== 2023 Finals series ===
Week One
First Elimination Final at Inverloch
3	Tooradin-Dalmore	12.10 (82)
6	Warragul Industrials	15.6 (96)
Second Elimination Final at Warragul
4	Nar Nar Goon	12.9 (81)
5	Cora Lynn	6.7 (43)

Week Two
Second Semi-Final at Nar Nar Goon
1	Inverloch-Kongwak	12.9 (81)
2	Phillip Island	12.8 (80)
First Semi-Final at Bass
Nar Nar Goon	10.12 (72)
Warragul Industrials	5.7 (37)

Week Three
Preliminary Final at Dalyston
Phillip Island	6.8 (44)
Nar Nar Goon	6.7 (43)

Week Four
Grand Final at Koo Wee Rup
Inverloch-Kongwak	10.15 (75)
Phillip Island	6.4 (40)

== 2024 Ladder ==
West Gippsland	Wins	Losses	Draws	For	Against	%	Pts
Cora Lynn	15	2	1	1918	822	233.33%	62
Phillip Island	15	2	1	1936	964	200.83%	62
Nar Nar Goon	15	3	0	1888	713	264.80%	60
Inverloch-Kongwak	14	4	0	1758	807	217.84%	56
Tooradin-Dalmore	13	5	0	1806	835	216.29%	52
Kilcunda Bass	10	8	0	1281	1255	102.07%	40
Warragul Industrials	7	11	0	1296	1437	90.19%	28
Koo Wee Rup	7	11	0	1154	1352	85.36%	28
Dalyston	4	14	0	1041	1646	63.24%	16
Garfield	4	14	0	633	1634	38.74%	16
Korumburra-Bena	3	15	0	800	1773	45.12%	12
Bunyip	0	18	0	288	2561	11.25%	0

=== 2024 Finals series ===
Week One
First Elimination Final at Inverloch
3	Nar Nar Goon	10.12 (72)
6	Kilcunda Bass	6.9 (45)
Second Elimination Final at Bass
4	Inverloch-Kongwak	10.11 (71)
5	Tooradin-Dalmore	10.6 (66)

Week Two
Second Semi-Final at Nar Nar Goon
1	Cora Lynn	5.11 (41)
2	Phillip Island	7.11 (53)
First Semi-Final at Cora Lynn
Nar Nar Goon	12.18 (90)
Inverloch-Kongwak	8.10 (58)

Week Three
Preliminary Final at Dalyston
Cora Lynn	10.7 (67)
Nar Nar Goon	13.11 (89)

Week Four
Grand Final at Garfield
Phillip Island	10.3 (63)
Nar Nar Goon	14.3 (87)
