= Ryan Maric =

Australian rules footballer (born 2004)

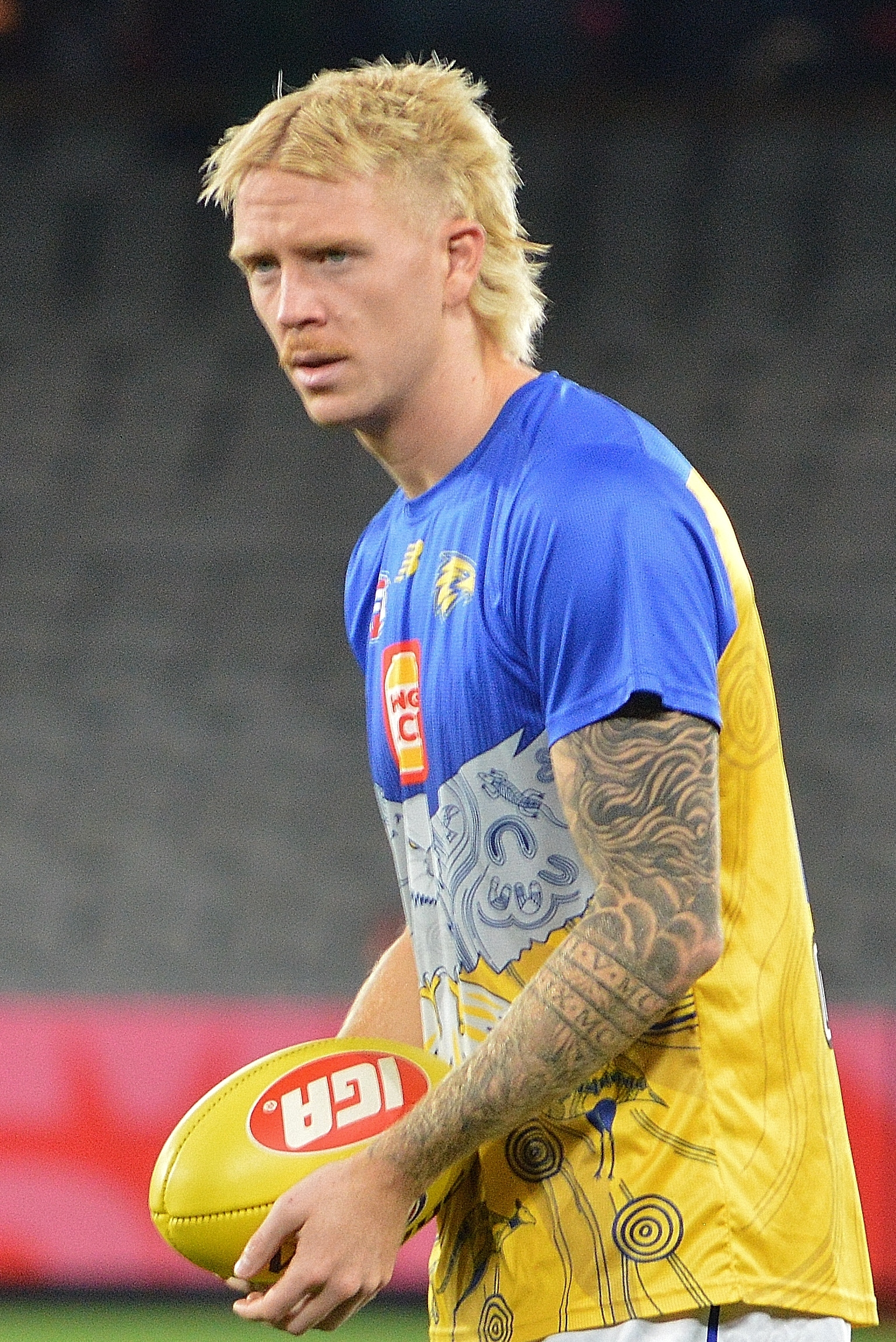
- Maric in May 2026

Personal information
- Full name: Ryan Maric
- Born: 6 September 2004 (age 22)
- Original teams: Gippsland Power (Talent League); Drouin (GL)
- Draft: No. 1, 2023 mid-season rookie draft
- Debut: Round 13, 2023, West Coast vs. Adelaide, at Adelaide Oval
- Height: 196 cm (6 ft 5 in)
- Weight: 93 kg (205 lb)
- Position: Defender

Club information
- Current club: West Coast
- Number: 23

Playing career^{1}
| Years | Club | Games (Goals) |
| 2023– | West Coast | 63 (18) |
- ^{1} Playing statistics correct to the end of round 22, 2026.

Ryan Maric (born 6 September 2004) is a professional Australian rules footballer who plays with the West Coast Eagles Football Club in the Australian Football League (AFL).

== Early career ==
Maric grew up in the West Gippsland town of Drouin. When he was 15 he had a growth spurt and gained 30cm in height. After the growth spurt caused some back issues and then a dose of glandular fever, he became overweight. Maric then worked hard to get to his current playing weight. During 2023, he played for four different teams; Gippsland Power, Victoria Country, the Young Guns and the Box Hill Hawks. His two games at Box Hill yielded 4 goals.

== AFL career ==
Maric was the first player picked in the 2023 mid-season draft. He received an eighteen-month contract with the Eagles. Maric played one game in the WAFL before getting called up to make his debut against Adelaide in Adelaide. Maric kicked a goal with his first kick in AFL football.

=== 2025: Switch to the backline as a medium defender ===
At the start of the 2025 season Maric was placed into the backline, playing a defensive role as a medium defender being switched from the forward and wing roles he played in the 2023 and 2024 seasons.

== Statistics ==
Updated to the end of round 22, 2026.

Legend
| G | Goals | K | Kicks | D | Disposals | T | Tackles |
| B | Behinds | H | Handballs | M | Marks |

| Season | Team | No. | Games | Totals | | | | | | | Averages (per game) | | | | | | | Votes |
| Season | Team | No. | Games | G | B | K | H | D | M | T | G | B | K | H | D | M | T | Votes |
|---|---|---|---|---|---|---|---|---|---|---|---|---|---|---|---|---|---|---|
| 2023 | West Coast | 41 | 10 | 9 | 2 | 45 | 55 | 100 | 28 | 26 | 0.9 | 0.2 | 4.5 | 5.5 | 10.0 | 2.8 | 2.6 | 0 |
| 2024 | West Coast | 41 | 19 | 7 | 4 | 107 | 78 | 185 | 60 | 24 | 0.4 | 0.2 | 5.6 | 4.1 | 9.7 | 3.2 | 1.3 | 0 |
| 2025 | West Coast | 23 | 22 | 1 | 0 | 314 | 146 | 460 | 84 | 44 | 0.0 | 0.0 | 14.3 | 6.6 | 20.9 | 3.8 | 2.0 | 1 |
| 2026 | West Coast | 23 | 12 | 1 | 2 | 119 | 94 | 213 | 46 | 25 | 0.1 | 0.2 | 9.9 | 7.8 | 17.8 | 3.8 | 2.1 | 0 |
| Career | | | 63 | 18 | 8 | 585 | 373 | 958 | 218 | 119 | 0.3 | 0.1 | 9.3 | 5.9 | 15.2 | 3.5 | 1.9 | 1 |
