= West Gippsland Football League =

West Gippsland Football League may refer to:

- West Gippsland Football Netball Competition (netball and Australian rules football)
- Gippsland League, formerly known as the "West Gippsland Latrobe Football League" (Australian rules football)
- West Gippsland Football League (1927-2001), a now-defunct Australian rules football competition.
