= Ellinbank & District Football League =

Sports league in Victoria, Australia

- Current season, competition or edition: 2024 EDFNL season
- Sport: Australian rules football
- Founded: 137
- Divisions: 1
- No. of teams: 12
- Country: Australia
- Most recent champions: Longwarry (2nd premiership)
- Website: EDFL (archived)

The Ellinbank and District Football Netball League (EDFNL), formerly known as the Ellinbank & District Football League (EDFL), is an Australian rules football and netball league, based in the West Gippsland region of Victoria for smaller towns and villages in the regions of Baw Baw, South Gippsland and Cardinia.

There are twelve clubs in the league, fielding two senior football sides and two football junior sides (U/16 and U/18) and three senior netball sides and three junior netball sides.

== History ==
The EDFL was founded in 1937.

In 2014, the league partitioned into two geographic divisions which operated as separate competitions with separate premiers. In this season, the seven-team western division comprised Nar Nar Goon, Garfield, Cora Lynn, Koo Wee Rup, Bunyip, Catani and Lang Lang; and the eastern division, with eight clubs, comprised Nyora, Poowong, Ellinbank, Nilma-Darnum, Warragul Industrials, Buln Buln, Neerim-Neerim South and Longwarry. This partition lasted only one year, and the league rejoined as a single division again from 2015.

In 2016 C31 broadcast a live match of the EDFL game between Koo Wee Rup and Cora Lynn.

In 2017 five clubs were redirected to found the West Gippsland Football Netball League. This left the league with ten clubs. The 2019 senior premiership was won by Longwarry Football Club over Ellinbank by 39 points. The grand final was played at Dowton Park Yarragon.

In the 2018 AFL Gippsland League Review, Yarragon joined from the neighbouring Mid Gippsland League. Warragul Industrials moved to the West Gippsland League, keeping the competition at ten clubs.

Due to the Coronavirus (COVID-19) outbreak, all EDFL competitions were abandoned for season 2020. Season 2021 saw games resume but due to COVID-19 restrictions a finals series was not played and there were no premiers.

In 2021 the Trafalgar Football and Netball Club joined the EDFL taking the total teams to 11. 2021 will also see the junior age structure change to Under 16.5 and Under 18.5

In 2022 the Ellinbank & District Football League and Ellinbank & District Netball Association merged to form the Ellinbank & District Football Netball League (EDFNL). The junior age groups will revert to Under 16 and Under 18 in football.

The 2023 senior premiership was won by Buln Buln over Neerim-Neerim South by 30 points. It is Buln Buln's first premiership since the 2014 EDFL East Grand Final, and their 11th total. The grand final was played at Dowton Park Yarragon and the game was broadcast locally on SEN Track 91.9FM

== Clubs ==
=== Current clubs ===
Club	Colours	Moniker	Home venue	Former League	Formed	Years in EDFL	EDFL Senior Premierships	
Club	Colours	Moniker	Home venue	Former League	Formed	Years in EDFL	Total	Years
Buln Buln		Lyrebirds	Buln Buln Recreation Reserve, Buln Buln	NDFL	1919	1949-	12	1956, 1965, 1979, 1980, 1981, 1994, 1997, 2001, 2002, 2014 (East), 2023, 2024
Bunyip		Bulldogs	Bunyip Recreation Reserve, Bunyip	WGFL, WGFNC	1879	1982-2016, 2025-	3	1990, 2000, 2012
Catani		Blues	Catani Recreation Reserve, Catani	WGFL	1923	1976-	4	1992, 2004, 2005, 2017
Ellinbank		Eagles	Ellinbank Recreation Reserve, Warragul South	WDJFA		1937-	15	1939, 1946, 1952, 1953, 1954, 1955, 1961, 1963, 1974, 1975, 1983, 1984, 1987, 1988, 1995
Lang Lang		Tigers	Lang Lang Community Recreation Precinct, Caldermeade	WGFL	1900	2000-	0	–
Longwarry		Crows	Longwarry Recreation Reserve, Longwarry	WGFL	1900s	1993-	2	2019, 2026
Neerim-Neerim South		Cats	Neerim South Recreation Reserve, Neerim South	–	1954	1954-	9	1962, 1964, 1966, 1978, 1982, 1998, 1999, 2022, 2025
Nilma Darnum (Nilma Lillico 1947-76)		Bombers	Darnum Recreation Reserve, Darnum	–	1947	1947-	4	1949, 1951, 1959, 2009
Nyora		Saints	Nyora Recreation Reserve, Nyora	BVWDFL	1880s	1967-	4	1993, 2006, 2007, 2018
Poowong		Magpies	Poowong Recreation Reserve, Poowong	SGFL	1900s	1967-	9	1967, 1970, 1972, 1973, 1977, 1985, 1989, 1991, 2003
Trafalgar		Bloods	Trafalgar Recreation Reserve, Trafalgar	MGFNL	1888	2021-	0	–
Yarragon		Panthers	Dowton Park Reserve, Yarragon	MGFNL	1895	2019-	0	–

=== Former clubs ===
Club	Colours	Moniker	Home Ground	Former League	Formed	Years in EDFL	EDFL Senior Premierships		Fate
Club	Colours	Moniker	Home Ground	Former League	Formed	Years in EDFL	Total	Years	Fate
Arawata				–	c. 1930s	1938-1939	0	-	Moved to Bass Valley FA in 1946
Cora Lynn	(2006-?)(?-2016)	Cobras	Cora Lynn Recreation Reserve, Cora Lynn	GL	1913	2005-2016	4	2008, 2014 (West), 2015, 2016	Formed West Gippsland FNC following 2016 season
Darnum			Darnum Recreation Reserve, Darnum	–	c. 1920s	1920s-1952, 1954	1	1947	Recess in 1953. Folded after 1954 season
Drouin Imperials				WGFL	c. 1920s	1938-1939	0	-	Competed in nearby reserves competitions post-war, folded in c. 1950s
Garfield		Stars	Garfield Recreation Reserve, Garfield	GL	1935	2010-2016	0	-	Formed West Gippsland FNC following 2016 season
Hallora			Hallora Recreation Reserve, Hallora	WGJFA	c. 1930s	1937-1952	1	1950	Merged with Strzelecki following 1952 season to form Hallora Strzelecki
Hallora Strzelecki			Hallora Recreation Reserve, Hallora	–	1953	1953-1987	4	1958, 1968, 1969, 1971	Folded
Koo Wee Rup		Demons	Koo Wee Rup Recreation Reserve, Koo Wee Rup	WGFL	c. 1900	2000-2016	0	-	Formed West Gippsland FNC following 2016 season
Nar Nar Goon		Goons	Nar Nar Goon Recreation Reserve, Nar Nar Goon	GL	c. 1900	2005-2016	1	2010	Formed West Gippsland FNC following 2016 season
Neerim		Bombers	Neerim Recreation Reserve, Neerim	NDFL	c. 1900s	1952-1953	0	-	Merged with Neerim South following 1953 season
Neerim Junction				NDFL	1924	1952-1953	0	-	Merged with Noojee following 1953 season to form Noojee Neerim Junction
Neerim South			Neerim South Recreation Reserve, Neerim South	NDFL	c. 1920s	1952-1953	0	-	Merged with Neerim following 1953 season to form Neerim-Neerim South
Noojee		Magpies	Noojee Recreation Reserve, Noojee	NDFL	c. 1920s	1952-1953	0	-	Merged with Neerim Junction following 1953 season to form Noojee Neerim Junction
Noojee Neerim Junction				–	1954	1954-1961	1	1957	Folded
Ripplebrook			Ripplebrook Recreation Reserve, Ripplebrook	WGJFA		1938-1950	0	-	Folded
Strzelecki				–	c. 1920s	c. 1920s-1952	0	-	Merged with Hallora following 1952 season to form Hallora-Strzelecki
Triholm				BVFA	1924	1946-1951	0	-	Returned to Bass Valley FA in 1952
Warragul Industrials		Dusties	Western Park, Warragul	–	1948	1948-2018	4	1948, 1976, 1986, 1996	Moved to West Gippsland FNC following 2018 season
Warragul Rovers				WGFL		1938-1961	0	-	Folded
Warragul seconds			Western Park, Warragul	–	1879	1938-1940	2	1938, 1940	Joined firsts in Latrobe Valley FL
Wooreen				–	1937	1937-1940	1	1937	Folded

== Premiers ==
- 1937 Wooreen
- 1938 Warragul 2nds
- 1939 Ellinbank
- 1940 Warragul 2nds
- 1941–45 In Recess
- 1946 Ellinbank
- 1947 Darnum
- 1948 Warragul Ind
- 1949 Nilma Lillico
- 1950 Hallora
- 1951 Nilma Lillico
- 1952 Ellinbank
- 1953 Ellinbank
- 1954 Ellinbank
- 1955 Ellinbank
- 1956 Buln Buln
- 1957 Noojee/Junction
- 1958 Hallora Strez
- 1959 Nilma Lillico
- 1960 Warragul Ind
- 1961 Ellinbank
- 1962 Neerim Neerim South
- 1963 Ellinbank
- 1964 Neerim Neerim South
- 1965 Buln Buln
- 1966 Neerim Neerim South
- 1967 Poowong
- 1968 Hallora Strez
- 1969 Hallora Strez
- 1970 Poowong
- 1971 Hallora Strez
- 1972 Poowong
- 1973 Poowong
- 1974 Ellinbank
- 1975 Ellinbank
- 1976 Warragul Ind
- 1977 Poowong
- 1978 Neerim Neerim South
- 1979 Buln Buln
- 1980 Buln Buln
- 1981 Buln Buln
- 1982 Neerim Neerim South
- 1983 Ellinbank
- 1984 Ellinbank
- 1985 Poowong
- 1986 Warragul Ind
- 1987 Ellinbank
- 1988 Ellinbank
- 1989 Poowong
- 1990 Bunyip
- 1991 Poowong
- 1992 Catani
- 1993 Nyora
- 1994 Buln Buln
- 1995 Ellinbank
- 1996 Warragul Ind
- 1997 Buln Buln
- 1998 Neerim Neerim South
- 1999 Neerim Neerim South
- 2000 Bunyip
- 2001 Buln Buln
- 2002 Buln Buln
- 2003 Poowong
- 2004 Catani
- 2005 Catani
- 2006 Nyora
- 2007 Nyora
- 2008 Cora Lynn
- 2009 Nilma Darnum
- 2010 Nar Nar Goon
- 2011 Garfield
- 2012 Bunyip
- 2013 Garfield
- 2014 Buln Buln (East)
- 2014 Cora Lynn (West)
- 2015 Cora Lynn
- 2016 Cora Lynn
- 2017 Catani
- 2018 Nyora
- 2019 Longwarry
- 2022 Neerim Neerim South
- 2023 Buln Buln
- 2024 Buln Buln
- 2025 Neerim Neerim South
- 2026 Longwarry

== VFL/AFL players ==
- 1963 - Barry Bourke – Neerim Neerim South – Melbourne
- 2021 - Jai Newcombe – Poowong – Hawthorn
