= Bass Valley Wonthaggi District Football League =

Australian rules football league

Bass Valley-Wonthaggi District Football League
- Most recent season or competition: 1995
- Sport: Australian rules football
- Founded: 1955
- First season: 1955
- Folded: 1995
- No. of teams: 7 (1995), 19 (historical)
- Country: Australia
- Last champion: Wonthaggi Rovers (1995)
- Most titles: Wonthaggi Rovers (8)
- Related competitions: Alberton FL

The Bass Valley-Wonthaggi District Football League was an Australian rules football league based in the Bass Coast region of West Gippsland, Victoria.

== History ==
The Bass Valley-Wonthaggi District Football League was formed from a merger of the Bass Valley Football Association and the Wonthaggi District Football League before the 1955 season. The founding clubs were Bass, Bena, Dalyston, East Wonthaggi, Glen Alvie, Inverloch, Korumburra Butter Factory, Loch, Nyora, Phillip Island and Shop Assistants. The early years of the competition were marked by change. After the inaugural season, the Butter Factory team disbanded and East Shops (later Wonthaggi Rovers) was formed by way of a merger of East Wonthaggi and Shop Assistants. Prior to the 1957 season Nyora were forced into recess due to their inability to field a reserve-grade side. Inverloch merged with Kongwak due to a lack of club officials and Bass merged with Kilcunda.

The BVWDFL entered a period of stability after the 1957 season. The league's numbers were boosted by the addition of Lang Lang from the West Gippsland Football League in 1967 and Wonthaggi Blues from the South Gippsland Football League in 1969. The 1971 grand final between Wonthaggi Blues and Wonthaggi Rovers - the first grand final meeting between the two crosstown rivals - was drawn, with the Blues winning the replay.

Lang Lang returned to the West Gippsland FL in 1981, with Korumburra taking their place a few years later in 1984. An increasing gap between the larger towns and smaller, rural areas proved to be the league's downfall. Glen Alvie folded after the 1987 season and Loch after 1993. Wonthaggi Blues sought to join the higher-standard Gippsland Latrobe Valley Football League, a request which was granted in 1994, leaving the BVWDFL with only 7 teams. Following a VCFL review, the BVWDFL was disbanded after the 1995 season. Phillip Island and Kilcunda-Bass joined the West Gippsland FL and the remaining 5 clubs joined the Alberton Football League.

== Clubs ==
=== Final ===
Club	Jumper	Nickname	Home Ground	Former League	Est.	Years in comp	BVWDFL Senior Premierships		Fate
Club	Jumper	Nickname	Home Ground	Former League	Est.	Years in comp	Total	Most recent	Fate
Bena	(1955-60s)(1960s-95)	Bulls, Beanmen	Korumburra Showgrounds, Korumburra	BVFA	1921	1955-1995	1	1984	Moved to Alberton FL after 1995 season
Dalyston		Magpies	Dalyston Recreation Reserve, Dalyston	W&DFL	1898	1955-1995	6	1958, 1959, 1961, 1963, 1976, 1989	Moved to Alberton FL after 1995 season
Inverloch-Kongwak		Demons	Inverloch Recreation Reserve, Inverloch	–	1957	1957-1995	7	1957, 1966, 1968, 1973, 1983, 1985, 1986	Moved to Alberton FL after 1995 season
Kilcunda-Bass		Cats	Bass Recreation Reserve, Bass	–	1957	1957-1995	3	1960, 1969, 1980	Moved to West Gippsland FL after 1995 season
Korumburra		Bullants	Korumburra Recreation Reserve, Korumburra	WGFL	1911	1984-1995	1	1992	Moved to Alberton FL after 1995 season
Phillip Island		Bulldogs	Cowes Recreation Reserve, Cowes	W&DFL	1932	1955-1995	4	1962, 1964, 1981, 1990	Moved to West Gippsland FL after 1995 season
Wonthaggi Rovers (East Shops 1956-57)		Tigers	Wonthaggi Recreation Reserve, Wonthaggi	–	1956	1956-1995	8	1956, 1974, 1975, 1982, 1987, 1988, 1994, 1995	Moved to Alberton FL after 1995 season

=== Former ===
Club	Jumper	Nickname	Home Ground	Former League	Est.	Years in comp	BVWDFL Senior Premierships		Fate
Club	Jumper	Nickname	Home Ground	Former League	Est.	Years in comp	Total	Most recent	Fate
Bass			Bass Recreation Reserve, Bass	W&DFL	1910	1955-1956	0	-	Merged with Kilcunda to form Kilcunda-Bass after 1956 season
East Wonthaggi			Wonthaggi Recreation Reserve, Wonthaggi	W&DFL	1920s	1955	0	-	Merged with Shop Assistants to form East Shops after 1955 season
Glen Alvie	(1955-68)(1969-87)	Hawks	Glen Alvie Recreation Reserve, Glen Alvie	BVFA	1900	1955-1987	0	-	Folded after 1987 season
Inverloch	Light with dark sash		Inverloch Recreation Reserve, Inverloch	W&DFL	1926	1955-1956	1	1955	Merged with Kongwak to form Inverloch-Kongwak after 1956 season
Kilcunda				W&DFL	1910	1955-1956	0	-	Merged with Bass to form Kilcunda-Bass after 1956 season
Korumburra Butter Factory				BVFA		1955	0	-	Folded after 1955 season
Kongwak			RN Scott Reserve, Kongwak	BVFA	1920	1955-1956	0	-	Merged with Inverloch to form Inverloch-Kongwak after 1956 season
Lang Lang		Blues	Lang Lang Showgrounds, Lang Lang	WGFL	1900	1967-1981	0	-	Returned to West Gippsland FL after 1981 season
Loch	Dark with light vee (c.1955-64)(c.1965-93)	Saints	Loch Recreation Reserve, Loch	BVFA	1890s	1955-1993	2	1965, 1967	Folded after 1993 season
Nyora			Nyora Recreation Reserve, Nyora	BVFA	1880s	1955-1956	0	-	Entered recess after 1956 season due to lacking a reserve side. Re-formed in Ellinbank & District FL in 1967.
Shop Assistants			Wonthaggi Recreation Reserve, Wonthaggi	W&DFL	1930s	1955	0	-	Merged with Wast Wonthaggi to form East Shops after 1955 season
Wonthaggi Blues		Blues	Wonthaggi Recreation Reserve, Wonthaggi	SGFL	1950	1969-1994	7	1971, 1972, 1977, 1978, 1979, 1991, 1993	Moved to Gippsland-Latrobe Valley FL after 1994 season

== Premierships ==
Year	Premiers	Score	Runners-up	Notes	Ref.
1955	Inverloch	15.9 (99) - 13.8 (86)	Phillip Island		
1956	East Shops	6.4 (40) - 4.12 (36)	Dalyston		
1957	Inverloch-Kongwak	13.13 (91) - 13.11 (89)	Kilcunda-Bass		
1958	Dalyston	12.15 (87) - 6.10 (46)	Phillip Island		
1959	Dalyston		Wonthaggi Rovers		
1960	Kilcunda-Bass	12.16 (88) - 13.8 (86)	Phillip Island		
1961	Dalyston	10.10 (70) - 8.7 (55)	Glen Alvie		
1962	Phillip Island	7.11 (53) - 6.10 (46)	Inverloch-Kongwak		
1963	Dalyston	8.8 (56) - 7.11 (53)	Phillip Island		
1964	Phillip Island	6.15 (51) - 4.5 (29)	Inverloch-Kongwak		
1965	Loch	15.6 (96) - 10.13 (73)	Inverloch-Kongwak		
1966	Inverloch-Kongwak	9.9 (63) - 6.4 (40)	Wonthaggi Rovers		
1967	Loch	12.12 (84) - 10.13 (73)	Inverloch-Kongwak		
1968	Inverloch-Kongwak	10.15 (75) - 5.10 (40)	Wonthaggi Rovers		
1969	Kilcunda-Bass		Inverloch-Kongwak		
1970	?		Kilcunda-Bass		
1971	Wonthaggi Blues	9.12 (66) - 10.6 (66)	Wonthaggi Rovers	Drawn grand final	
1971	Wonthaggi Blues	11.15 (81) - 9.9 (63)	Wonthaggi Rovers	Replay	
1972	Wonthaggi Blues	13.19 (97) - 10.11 (71)	Inverloch-Kongwak		
1973	Inverloch-Kongwak				
1974	Wonthaggi Rovers	10.6 (66) - 5.10 (40)	Kilcunda-Bass		
1975	Wonthaggi Rovers				
1976	Dalyston	11.12 (78) - 8.15 (63)	Lang Lang		
1977	Wonthaggi Blues	15.21 (111) - 15.7 (97)	Glen Alvie		
1978	Wonthaggi Blues	16.15 (111) - 6.14 (50)	Inverloch-Kongwak		
1979	Wonthaggi Blues	14.11 (95) - 9.14 (68)	Kilcunda-Bass		
1980	Kilcunda-Bass	22.13 (145) - 16.9 (105)	Phillip Island		
1981	Phillip Island	14.10 (94) - 12.12 (84)	Wonthaggi Blues		
1982	Wonthaggi Rovers	17.12 (114) - 6.17 (53)	Bena		
1983	Inverloch-Kongwak	12.17 (89) - 6.7 (43)	Bena		
1984	Bena	18.11 (119) - 4.7 (31)	Dalyston		
1985	Inverloch-Kongwak	11.5 (71) - 8.9 (57)	Dalyston		
1986	Inverloch-Kongwak				
1987	Wonthaggi Rovers	16.9 (105) - 12.15 (87)	Korumburra		
1988	Wonthaggi Rovers	7.13 (55) - 7.9 (51)	Dalyston		
1989	Dalyston	17.12 (114) - 6.9 (45)	Wonthaggi Rovers		
1990	Phillip Island	15.9 (99) - 13.8 (86)	Wonthaggi Blues		
1991	Wonthaggi Blues	17.16 (118) - 18.10 (118)	Phillip Island	Drawn grand final	
1991	Wonthaggi Blues	13.14 (92) - 12.15 (87)	Phillip Island	Replay	
1992	Korumburra	11.14 (87) - 6.11 (47)	Dalyston		
1993	Wonthaggi Blues	20.9 (129) - 12.13 (85)	Inverloch-Kongwak		
1994	Wonthaggi Rovers	10.13 (73) - 10.11 (71)	Phillip Island		
1995	Wonthaggi Rovers	15.17 (107) - 14.7 (91)	Phillip Island		
