= South West Gippsland Football League =

- Most recent season or competition: 1994
- Sport: Australian rules football
- Founded: 1954
- First season: 1954
- Folded: 1994
- No. of teams: 8 (final season); 15 (historical)
- Country: Australia
- Last champion: Dingley (1994)
- Most titles: Cranbourne (8)
- Related competitions: Dandenong Districts FA; Mornington Peninsula Nepean FL; South East FNL

The South West Gippsland Football League (SWGFL) was an Australian rules football league containing clubs based in West Gippsland and Melbourne's outer south-east.

== History ==
The South West Gippsland Football League was formed in late 1953, when 5 clubs of the Dandenong Districts Football Association - Beaconsfield, Cranbourne, Officer, Rythdale-Cardinia and Tooradin-Dalmore resigned from it to form a new league. They would later joined by Berwick and the newly-formed Narre Hallam to form a 7-team competition in 1954.

The league became more suburban as new clubs joined from newly-developed suburbs past Dandenong in Melbourne's south east. Lyndhurst-Hampton Park joined in 1958, Doveton in 1959, Chelsea Heights in 1973 and Devon Meadows in 1977. Dingley also joined from the South East Suburban FL in 1977. Country-based clubs began to depart the league during the 1970s. Tooradin-Dalmore left for the West Gippsland FL in 1976, while Officer merged with Rythdale-Cardinia after a year in recess in 1976. The merged club also moved to the WGFL after two more seasons, 1979. South Belgrave joined the SWGFL in 1978 after being denied promotion to the Yarra Valley Mountain District FL's first division despite winning two premierships in a row. They would return to the YVMDFL after a winless 1982 season.

The 1980s were dominated by Cranbourne and Doveton, who won 10 premierships between them between 1982 and 1991. Cranbourne scored 32.18 (210) against Doveton in the 1986 grand final, which remains one of the highest grand final scores ever recorded.

Beaconsfield and Chelsea Heights both departed the SWGFL after the 1992 season, leaving the league with 8 clubs. Following a VCFL review in 1994, the SWGFL was merged into the Mornington Peninsula Nepean Football League, with Devon Meadows joining the Southern division and the rest of the SWGFL clubs forming the new Northern division of that competition.

== Clubs ==
=== Final ===
Club	Jumper	Nickname	Home Ground	Former League	Est.	Years in SWGFL	SWGFL Senior Premierships		Fate
Club	Jumper	Nickname	Home Ground	Former League	Est.	Years in SWGFL	Total	Years	Fate
Berwick		Wickers	Edwin Flack Oval, Berwick	DDFA, VFA	1903	1954-1982, 1988-1994	3	1954, 1977, 1978	Played in VFA between 1983-87. Moved to Mornington Peninsula Nepean FL after 1994 season
Cranbourne		Eagles	Livingston Recreation Reserve, Cranbourne East	DDFA	1889	1954-1994	8	1966, 1985, 1986, 1987, 1989, 1990, 1991, 1993	Moved to Mornington Peninsula Nepean FL after 1994 season
Devon Meadows		Panthers	Glover Reserve, Devon Meadows	–	1977	1977-1994	0	-	Moved to Mornington Peninsula Nepean FL after 1994 season
Dingley		Dingoes	Souter Oval, Dingley Village	SESFL	1958	1977-1994	1	1994	Moved to Mornington Peninsula Nepean FL after 1994 season
Doveton		Doves	Robinson Reserve, Doveton	CODFL, FFL	1959	1959-1971, 1977-1994	6	1969, 1979, 1982, 1983, 1984, 1988	Played in Federal FL between 1972-76. Moved to Mornington Peninsula Nepean FL after 1994 season
Hampton Park (Lyndhurst-Hampton Park 1958-66)		Redbacks	Robert Booth Reserve, Hampton Park	–	1958	1958-1994	5	1959, 1960, 1963, 1967, 1967	Moved to Mornington Peninsula Nepean FL after 1994 season
Keysborough		Burras	Rowley Allan Reserve, Keysborough	CFGFL	1946	1958-1994	4	1962, 1964, 1965, 1976	Moved to Mornington Peninsula Nepean FL after 1994 season
Narre Warren (Narre Hallam 1954-91)		Magpies	Kalora Park, Narre Warren North	–	1953	1954-1994	3	1957, 1973, 1992	Moved to Mornington Peninsula Nepean FL after 1994 season

=== Former ===
Club	Jumper	Nickname	Home Ground	Former League	Est.	Years in SWGFL	SWGFL Senior Premierships		Fate
Club	Jumper	Nickname	Home Ground	Former League	Est.	Years in SWGFL	Total	Years	Fate
Beaconsfield	(1954-64)(1965-92)	Tigers	Perc Allison Oval, Beaconsfield	DDFA	1890	1954-1992	3	1974, 1980, 1981	Moved to West Gippsland FL after 1992 season
Chelsea Heights		Demons	Beazley Reserve, Chelsea Heights	–	1969	1973-1992	0	-	Moved to Southern FL after 1992 season
Koo Wee Rup		Demons	Koo Wee Rup Recreation Reserve, Koo Wee Rup	WGFL	c.1900	1958-1962	0	-	Returned to West Gippsland FL in 1963
Officer		Lions	Officer Recreation Reserve, Officer	DDFA	1932	1954-1975	1	1961	Recess in 1976. Merged with Rythdale-Cardinia to form Rythdale-Officer-Cardinia before 1977 season
Rythdale-Cardinia		Saints	Cardinia Recreation Reserve, Cardinia	DDFA	1928	1954-1976	1	1955	Merged with Officer to form Rythdale-Officer-Cardinia before1977 season
Rythdale-Officer-Cardinia		Roos	Officer Recreation Reserve, Officer	–	1977	1977-1978	0	-	Moved to West Gippsland FL after 1978 season
South Belgrave		Saints	Belgrave South Recreation Reserve, Belgrave South	YVMDFL	1946	1978-1982	0	-	Returned to Yarra Valley Mountain District FL after 1982 season
Tooradin-Dalmore		Seagulls	Tooradin Recreation Reserve, Tooradin	DDFA	1922	1954-1975	6	1956, 1958, 1970, 1971, 1972, 1975	Moved to West Gippsland FL after 1975 season

== Grand finals ==
Year	Premiers	Score	Runners-up	Ref.
1954	Berwick	14.11 (95) to 12.6 (78)	Cranbourne	
1955	Rythdale-Cardinia	10.6 (66) to 7.8 (50)	Cranbourne	
1956	Tooradin-Dalmore	11.8 (74) to 5.4 (34)	Narre-Hallam	
1957	Narre-Hallam	10.11 (71) to 7.10 (52)	Cranbourne	
1958	Tooradin-Dalmore	12.11 (83) to 10.8 (68)	Lyndhurst-Hampton Park	
1959	Lyndhurst-Hampton Park	10.10 (70) to 7.14 (56)	Tooradin-Dalmore	
1960	Lyndhurst-Hampton Park	7.9 (51) to 4.12 (36)	Kooweerup	
1961	Officer	6.14 (50) to 7.6 (48)	Kooweerup	
1962	Keysborough	10.8 (68) to 4.12 (36)	Tooradin-Dalmore	
1963	Lyndhurst-Hampton Park	8.12 (60) to 7.11 (53)	Keysborough	
1964	Keysborough	13.13 (91) to 4.11 (35)	Lyndhurst-Hampton Park	
1965	Keysborough	10.11 (71) to 9.10 (64)	Lyndhurst-Hampton Park	
1966	Cranbourne	8.4 (52) to 5.17 (47)	Lyndhurst-Hampton Park	
1967	Hampton Park	8.11 (59) to 6.14 (50)	Tooradin-Dalmore	
1968	Hampton Park	14.11 (95) to 9.23 (77)	Cranboroune	
1969	Doveton	14.24 (118) to 9.9 (63)	Narre-Hallam	
1970	Tooradin-Dalmore	19.12 (126) to 7.11 (53)	Narre-Hallam	
1971	Tooradin-Dalmore	15.19 (109) to 9.6 (60)	Narre-Hallam	
1972	Tooradin-Dalmore	12.19 (91) to 7.13 (55)	Beaconsfield	
1973	Narre-Hallam	19.4 (118) to 11.16 (82)	Beaconsfield	
1974	Beaconsfield	4.9 (33) to 3.8 (26)	Keysborough	
1975	Tooradin-Dalmore	14.14 (98) - 13.15 (93)	Keysborough	
1976	Keysborough	13.11 (89) to 7.13 (55)	Berwick	
1977	Berwick	19.19 (133) to 18.12 (120)	Chelsea Heights	
1978	Berwick	16.19 (115) to 8.14 (62)	Chelsea Heights	
1979	Doveton	18.9 (117) to 10.12 (72)	Berwick	
1980	Beaconsfield	22.16 (148) to 14.14 (98)	Berwick	
1981	Beaconsfield	13.12 (90) to 10.13 (73)	Narre-Hallam	
1982	Doveton	25.15 (165) to 22.20 (152)	Beaconsfield	
1983	Doveton	21.14 (140) to 7.10 (52)	Dingley	
1984	Doveton	15.26 (116) to 12.11 (83)	Keysborough	
1985	Cranbourne	17.7 (109) to 12.13 (85)	Doveton	
1986	Cranbourne	32.18 (210) to 11.13 (79)	Doveton	
1987	Cranbourne	25.22 (172) to 18.9 (117)	Doveton	
1988	Doveton	23.21 (159) to 12.15 (87)	Cranbourne	
1989	Cranbourne	22.14 (147) to 15.9 (99)	Keysborough	
1990	Cranbourne	18.17 (125) to 14.19 (103)	Doveton	
1991	Cranbourne	18.11 (119) to 10.7 (67)	Doveton	
1992	Narre Warren	17.14 (116) to 9.20 (74)	Keysborough	
1993	Cranbourne	12.15 (87) - 12.13 (85)	Narre Warren	
1994	Dingley	19.14 (128) to 15.14 (104)	Cranbourne	
