= West Gippsland Football League (1927–2001) =

- Most recent season or competition: 2001
- Sport: Australian rules football
- Founded: 1927
- First season: 1927
- Folded: 2001
- No. of teams: 11 (1995), 28 (historical)
- Country: Australia
- Last champion: Beaconsfield (2001)
- Most titles: Pakenham (22)
- Related competitions: Gippsland League

The West Gippsland Football League was an Australian rules football competition based in the West Gippsland region of Victoria. It ran every year between 1927 and 2001 except for 1936.

== History ==
The West Gippsland Football Association was founded in 1927 and was fundamentally a continuation of the Cora Lynn & District Junior Football Association that had formed the previous year. The original 8 clubs included the 6 CL&DJFA clubs (Pakenham, Iona, Cora Lynn, Tynong, Bunyip and Catani) plus Longwarry from the Central Gippsland FL and Koo Wee Rup from the Southern Gippsland FL.

The early years of the WGFA featured a rotating door of clubs. Catani left for the West Gippsland Junior Football Association in 1930. Koo Wee Rup Rovers played one season in 1928 before folding. Iona left for the CGFL after 1927 but returned in 1933. Tynong merged with Nar Nar Goon after the 1928 season, and Cora Lynn merged with Bayles in 1929 before spending time in recess during the 1930s. Koo Wee Rup left for the Beaconsfield Junior Football Association in 1932. Other clubs to spend time in the league included Officer-Toomuc (1932–33), Nar Nar Goon (joined in 1931), Warragul Rovers (1934–35) and Drouin (1931–32).

Before the 1936 season Pakenham left for the Dandenong District Football Association, while Iona and Warragul Rovers both entered recess. This left the WGFA with only 3 clubs and it was decided to disband the Association for the season as a result. The association was re-formed in 1937 as the West Gippsland Football League, with 8 clubs.

The 1938 grand final was notable for being decided with a kick after the siren. Longwarry led Bunyip by 3 points deep into the final quarter, but Bunyip's Reidy took a mark 60 yards out from goal as the siren sounded and kicked the goal to give Bunyip a 3-point win.

The 1939 grand final between Bunyip and Garfield was scheduled to take place at Nar Nar Goon on the 26th of August. A delegation from Garfield travelled to Bunyip to request that the final be delayed by a week as they considered the ground unfit for play due to being too wet. This was refused by Bunyip. Bizarrely, despite subsequent inspections revealing the ground to be in better condition than it had been during the season, Garfield announced that they would not play on the Friday before the game. Bunyip took the field on the 26th against zero opposition players, kicked a goal and were awarded the premiership. The only Garfield player to arrive at Nar Nar Goon had travelled from Melbourne but had not been informed of his team's decision to forfeit. He was, reportedly, baffled by his club's decision to forfeit the grand final.

The WGFL was in recess between 1942 and 1943 due to WWII enlistments. It re-formed in 1944 with 8 clubs and expanded to 12 by 1948 as clubs re-formed after the war. Nyora played two seasons (1948–49) before returning to the Bass Valley Football Association, while Rythdale-Cardinia joined the Dandenong District FA in 1949 after finishing last in all but 2 of their 9 WGFL seasons. Drouin briefly played in the Latrobe Valley Football League between 1960 and 1965, while Yarragon joined from the LVFL in 1961.

The WGFL began to shift towards catering for clubs from larger towns and areas closer to Melbourne during the 1970s. Korumburra joined in 1970 from the defunct South Gippsland FL, while Tooradin-Dalmore and Rythdale-Officer-Cardinia joined from the South West Gippsland FL in 1976 and 1979 respectively. The increasing competition from these large clubs saw long-term member clubs from small towns depart the WGFL. Catani joined the Ellinbank & District FL in 1976, Bunyip in 1982, Longwarry in 1988, and Lang Lang and Koo Wee Rup in 1999. Yarragon left for the Mid Gippsland FL in 1977 and Korumburra for the Bass Valley Wonthaggi District FL in 1984. Beaconsfield joined in 1993 and along with Pakenham had become the two strongest clubs in the competition by the new millennium. A VCFL review in 2002 saw them moved to the Mornington Peninsula Nepean Football League, while the West Gippsland FL would be merged with the Gippsland-Latrobe Valley FL to form the West Gippsland-Latrobe Valley FL before the 2002 season.

== Clubs ==
=== Final ===
Club	Colours	Nickname	Home Ground	Former League	Est.	Years in WGFL	WGFL Senior Premierships		Fate
Club	Colours	Nickname	Home Ground	Former League	Est.	Years in WGFL	Total	Years	Fate
Beaconsfield	(1993–99)(2000–01)	Eagles	Perc Allison Oval, Beaconsfield	SWGFL	1890	1993-2001	2	1999, 2001	Moved to Mornington Peninsula Nepean FL after 2001 season
Cora Lynn (Cora Lynn Bayles 1929-33, 1939-41; Bayles 1937-38)	(1940s-60s)(1960s-92)(1993–2001)	Cobras	Cora Lynn Recreation Reserve, Cora Lynn	CL&DJFA, BJFA,WGJFA	1913	1927-1931, 1933, 1937–1941, 1945–2001	1	1986	Played in Beaconsfield Junior FA in 1932. Recess in 1934. Formed West Gippsland-Latrobe FL after 2001 season
Drouin		Hawks	Drouin Recreation Reserve, Drouin	CGFL, WGJFA	1890	1931-1932, 1941, 1945–1959, 1966–2001	8	1941, 1946, 1949, 1958, 1967, 1978, 1991, 1992	Played in Central Gippsland FL between 1933–38 and Latrobe Valley FL between 1960 and 1965. Formed West Gippsland-Latrobe FL after 2001 season
Garfield (Garfield Stars 1937-40)		Stars	Garfield Recreation Reserve, Garfield	WGJFA	1935	1937-1940, 1945–2001	6	1963, 1964, 1966, 1983, 1993, 1994	Formed West Gippsland-Latrobe FL after 2001 season
Kilcunda Bass		Panthers	Bass Recreation Reserve, Bass	BVWDFL	1957	1996-2001	0	-	Formed West Gippsland-Latrobe FL after 2001 season
Nar Nar Goon (Tynong-Nar Nar Goon 1931)	(1921-1928,1932-1940, 1950-1952)(1931)(1945–49)(1953–92)(1993–2001)	Goons	Nar Nar Goon Recreation Reserve, Nar Nar Goon	WGJFA	c.1900	1931-1935, 1937–1940, 1945–2001	6	1933, 1934, 1937, 1965, 1970, 1980,	Played in West Gippsland Junior FA in 1936. Formed West Gippsland-Latrobe FL after 2001 season
Pakenham	(1950s-?)(?-2001)	Lions	Toomuc Reserve, Pakenham	CL&DJFA, DDFA	1892	1927-1935, 1938–2001	22	1927, 1929, 1935, 1947, 1948, 1951, 1952, 1955, 1956, 1957, 1961, 1962, 1972, 1973, 1974, 1982, 1987, 1988, 1989, 1990, 1998, 2000	Played in Dandenong Districts FA between 1936 and 1937. Moved to Mornington Peninsula Nepean FL after 2001 season
Phillip Island		Bulldogs	Cowes Recreation Reserve, Cowes	BVWDFL	1932	1996-2001	0	-	Formed West Gippsland-Latrobe FL after 2001 season
Rythdale-Officer-Cardina		Kangaroos	Officer Recreation Reserve, Officer	SWGFL	1882	1979-2001	2	1995, 1996	Formed West Gippsland-Latrobe FL after 2001 season
Tooradin-Dalmore		Seagulls	Tooradin Recreation Reserve, Tooradin	SWGFL	1922	1976-2001	4	1977, 1984, 1985, 1997	Formed West Gippsland-Latrobe FL after 2001 season
Warragul		Gulls	Western Park Reserve, Warragul	GLVFL	1879	2000-2001	0	-	Formed West Gippsland-Latrobe FL after 2001 season

=== Former ===
Club	Colours	Nickname	Home Ground	Former League	Est.	Years in WGFL	WGFL Senior Premierships		Fate
Club	Colours	Nickname	Home Ground	Former League	Est.	Years in WGFL	Total	Years	Fate
Bunyip (Bunyip Rovers 1935-37)		Bulldogs	Bunyip Recreation Reserve, Bunyip	CL&DJFA, WGJFA	1879	1927-1933, 1935, 1937–1981	3	1938, 1939, 1945	Played in West Gippsland Junior FA in 1934 and 1936. Moved to Ellinbank & District FL after 1982 season
Catani		Cats	Catani Recreation Reserve, Catani	CL&DJFA, WGJFA	1923	1927-1929, 1937, 1948–1975	2	1953, 1954	Moved to West Gippsland Junior FA in 1930. Recess after 1937 season. Moved to Ellinbank & District FL after 1975 season
Cora Lynn-Catani				–	1944	1944	1	1944	De-merged into Cora Lynn and Catani after 1944 season
Drouin Imperials				WGJFA		1937	0	-	Moved to Ellinbank & District FL after 1937 season
Garfield (1)			Garfield Recreation Reserve, Garfield	CGFL		1929	0	-	Moved to Central Gippsland FL after 1929 season.
Iona (Iona Rovers 1935)			Garfield Recreation Reserve, Garfield	CL&DJFA		1927, 1932–1935	0	-	Moved to Central Gippsland FL after 1927 season. Folded after 1935 season
Koo Wee Rup		Demons	Koo Wee Rup Recreation Reserve, Koo Wee Rup	SGFL, SWGFL	c.1900	1927-1931, 1934, 1937–1939, 1944–1957, 1963–1999	4	1931, 1969, 1979, 1981	Played in Beaconsfield Junior FA in 1932–33. Recess in 1935 and 1940–41. Played in South West Gippsland FL between 1958-62. Moved to Ellinbank & District FL after 1999 season
Koo Wee Rup Rovers			Koo Wee Rup Recreation Reserve, Koo Wee Rup	SGFL		1928-1929	0	-	Folded after 1929 season
Korumburra		Bullants	Korumburra Recreation Reserve, Korumburra	SGFL	1911	1969-1983	3	1971, 1975, 1976	Moved to Bass Valley Wonthaggi District FL after 1983 season
Lang Lang	(1940s-50s)(1982–99)	Tigers	Lang Lang Showgrounds, Lang Lang	SGFL, LLKFA, BVWDFL	1900	1928-1934, 1944–1966, 1982–1999	1	1928	Formed Lang Lang Korumburra FA after 1934 season. Played in Bass Valley Wonthaggi District FL between 1967 and 1981. Moved to Moved to Ellinbank & District FL after 1999 season
Longwarry		Blues	Longwarry Recreation Reserve, Longwarry	WGJFA	1900s	1927-1935, 1937–1988	7	1930, 1932, 1940, 1950, 1959, 1960, 1968	Played in West Gippsland Junior FA in 1936. Moved to Ellinbank & District FL after 1988 season
Officer-Toomuc			Officer Recreation Reserve, Officer	–	1932	1932-1933	0	-	Moved to Cardinia & District FA after 1933 season
Nyora			Nyora Recreation Reserve, Nyora	BVFA	1880s	1948-1949	0	-	Returned to Bass Valley FA after 1949 season
Rythdale-Cardinia		The Dale	Cardinia Recreation Reserve, Cardinia	–	1938	1938-1949	0	-	Moved to Dandenong District FA after 1949 season
Tynong			Tynong Recreation Reserve, Tynong	CL&DJFA		1927-1928	0	-	Merged with Nar Nar Goon after 1928 season
Warragul Rovers				NJFA		1934-1935	0	-	Folded after 1935 season. Re-formed in Ellinbank & District FL in 1938
Yarragon		Magpies	Dowton Park Reserve, Yarragon	LVFL	1895	1961-1976	0	-	Moved to Mid Gippsland FL after 1976 season

== Premierships ==
Year	Premiers	Score	Runners-up	Location	Notes	Ref.
1927	Pakenham	13.13 (91) - 7.9 (51)	Catani	Longwarry		
1928	Lang Lang	11.13 (79) - 5.12 (42)	Koo Wee Rup			
1929	Pakenham	Margin "over 5 goals"	Lang Lang	Bunyip		
1930	Longwarry	13.12 (90) - 5.8 (38)	Lang Lang			
1931	Koo Wee Rup	8.10 (58) - 7.10 (52)	Lang Lang	Nar Nar Goon		
1932	Longwarry	8.12 (60) - 6.9 (45)	Pakenham	Garfield		
1933	Nar Nar Goon	9.8 (62) - 8.10 (58)	Pakenham	Bunyip		
1934	Nar Nar Goon	11.13 (79) - 10.13 (73)	Pakenham			
1935	Pakenham	17.12 (114) - 8.10 (58)	Warragul Rovers			
1936 - WGFL in recess
1937	Nar Nar Goon	8.14 (62) - 8.11 (59)	Bunyip	Bunyip		
1938	Bunyip	9.7 (61) - 5.11 (41)	Longwarry	Garfield	Won with a kick after the siren	
1939	Bunyip	N/A	Garfield	Nar Nar Goon	Match forfeited by Garfield	
1940	Longwarry	17.18 (120) - 10.16 (76)	Pakenham	Garfield		
1941	Drouin	10.13 (76) - 10.6 (66)	Pakenham	Bunyip		
1942-43 - WGFL in recess due to WWII
1944	Cora Lynn-Catani	11.11 (77) - 7.7 (49)	Garfield	Garfield		
1945	Bunyip	10.6 (66) - 9.10 (64)	Longwarry	Garfield		
1946	Drouin	10.7 (67) - 9.6 (60)	Pakenham			
1947	Pakenham	15.15 (105) - 2.11 (23)	Drouin	Garfield		
1948	Pakenham	12.8 (80) - 3.7 (25)	Drouin	Nar Nar Goon		
1949	Drouin		Pakenham	Nar Nar Goon		
1950	Longwarry	8.9 (57) - 6.14 (50)	Pakenham			
1951	Pakenham		Cora Lynn			
1952	Pakenham	8.10 (58) - 8.10 (58)	Garfield		Drawn grand final	
1952	Pakenham		Garfield		Replay	
1953	Catani	3.5 (23) - 2.9 (17)	Pakenham	Bunyip		
1954	Catani	9.15 (69) - 9.8 (62)	Drouin			
1955	Pakenham		Cora Lynn			
1956	Pakenham		Bunyip			
1957	Pakenham		Drouin			
1958	Drouin		Pakenham			
1959	Longwarry		Nar Nar Goon			
1960	Longwarry		Garfield			
1961	Pakenham		Nar Nar Goon			
1962	Pakenham		Garfield			
1963	Garfield		Pakenham			
1964	Garfield	6.14 (50) - 6.5 (41)	Nar Nar Goon			
1965	Nar Nar Goon	15.14 (104) - 12.13 (85)	Garfield			
1966	Garfield		Drouin			
1967	Drouin		Longwarry			
1968	Longwarry		Nar Nar Goon			
1969	Koo Wee Rup		Longwarry			
1970	Nar Nar Goon		Korumburra			
1971	Korumburra		Nar Nar Goon			
1972	Pakenham		Koo Wee Rup			
1973	Pakenham		Koo Wee Rup			
1974	Pakenham		Koo Wee Rup			
1975	Korumburra		Nar Nar Goon			
1976	Korumburra	16.8 (104) - 9.9 (63)	Cora Lynn			
1977	Tooradin-Dalmore	14.10 (94) - 10.13 (73)	Korumburra			
1978	Drouin	19.23 (123) - 8.15 (63)	Cora Lynn			
1979	Koo Wee Rup		Nar Nar Goon			
1980	Nar Nar Goon	12.14 (86) - 9.12 (66)	Koo Wee Rup			
1981	Koo Wee Rup	11.13 (79) - 10.16 (76)	Drouin			
1982	Pakenham		Drouin			
1983	Garfield		Drouin			
1984	Tooradin-Dalmore		Longwarry			
1985	Tooradin-Dalmore	14.11 (95) - 9.8 (62)	Pakenham			
1986	Cora Lynn	14.7 (91) - 8.12 (60)	Pakenham			
1987	Pakenham	13.14 (92) - 9.4 (58)	Lang Lang			
1988	Pakenham	11.7 (73) - 8.7 (55)	Cora Lynn			
1989	Pakenham	12.9 (81) - 10.8	Drouin			
1990	Pakenham	15.15 (105) - 12.16 (88)	Drouin			
1991	Drouin	24.23 (167) - 8.7 (55)	Cora Lynn			
1992	Drouin	9.9 (63) - 5.6 (36)	Garfield			
1993	Garfield	21.11 (137) - 11.9 (75)	Rythdale-Officer-Cardinia			
1994	Garfield	10.16 (76) - 7.13 (55)	Rythdale-Officer-Cardinia			
1995	Rythdale-Officer-Cardinia	21.12 (138) - 13.9 87)	Beaconsfield			
1996	Rythdale-Officer-Cardinia	13.13 (91) - 11.11 (77)	Garfield			
1997	Tooradin-Dalmore	17.12 (114) - 12.15 (87)	Rythdale-Officer-Cardinia			
1998	Pakenham	14.14 (98) - 11.12 (78)	Garfield	Nar Nar Goon		
1999	Beaconsfield	16.11 (107) - 9.10 (64)	Tooradin-Dalmore			
2000	Pakenham	7.13 (55) - 2.0 (12)	Beaconsfield			
2001	Beaconsfield	16.11 (107) - 6.13 (49)	Garfield	Cora Lynn		
