= Herman Bartlett =

Australian rules footballer

Personal information
- Full name: Herman Colin Bartlett
- Born: 5 March 1892; Fitzroy North, Victoria
- Died: 8 August 1966 (aged 74); Fitzroy, Victoria
- Original team: Northcote

Playing career^{1}
Years	Club	Games (Goals)
1910	Fitzroy	1 (1)
1912	Carlton	2 (0)
Total		3 (1)
- ^{1} Playing statistics correct to the end of 1912.

Herman Colin Bartlett (5 March 1892 – 8 August 1966) was an Australian rules footballer who played with Fitzroy and Carlton in the Victorian Football League (VFL).

In March 2024 the Carlton Football Club published an article that included a photo of Herman as a member of the 1915 Bunyip Football Club Premiership Team, found by Fitzroy Football Club researcher Brenden Campbell, which reduced the number of Carlton players represented by at least one photo in the club's archive to 113.
