= South East Football Netball League =

Australian rules football competition

- Governing body: AFL South East
- Founded: 20 November 2014; 11 years ago
- First season: 2015
- Ceased: 2018; 8 years ago
- No. of teams: 8
- State: (Victoria (state)) Victoria
- Region: Casey–Cardinia
- Most premierships: Berwick (3)
- Related competitions: Mornington Peninsula Nepean FL; South West Gippsland FL; South East Juniors

The South East Football Netball League (SEFNL) was an Australian rules football competition based in south-eastern Melbourne.

The league was established ahead of the 2015 season as a breakaway from the Casey–Cardinia division of the Mornington Peninsula Nepean Football League (MPNFL), but merged with the Yarra Valley Mountain District Football League (YVMDFL) at the end of 2018 to form the Outer East Football Netball League (OEFNL).

Berwick was the most successful club in the SEFNL's short history, winning three senior premierships and appearing in all four senior grand finals.

== History ==
The competition had its origins in the South West Gippsland Football League (SWGFL) from 1954 to 1994. In 1995 the league was rolled in the MPNFL and the administrative duties were taken by the MPNFL management. While under the MPNFL control there were three minor re-distributions of clubs and that created different divisions, most of the clubs were in the MPNFL Northern Division 1995–98; MPNFL Peninsula Division 1999–2004; and MPNFL Casey-Cardinia League 2005–2014.

=== Breakaway ===
A spokesman for the CCFNL clubs Kahl Heinze said: "There was excitement and elation to have reached this point in the process. Poor communication, a lack of financial transparency and management, lack of strategic direction and a lack of service to the CCFNL clubs were some of the grievances that led to the clubs pursuing the move for independence."

== Clubs ==
=== Final clubs ===
Club	Colours	Nickname	Home Ground	Former League	Est.	Years in SEFNL	Premierships		Fate
Club	Colours	Nickname	Home Ground	Former League	Est.	Years in SEFNL	Total	Years (SEFNL flags in bold)	Fate
Beaconsfield		Eagles	Holm Park, Beaconsfield	MPNFL	1890	2015-2018	10	1953, 1974, 1980, 1981, 1982, 1999, 2001, 2003, 2004, 2014	Moved to **Outer East FNL** in 2019
Berwick		Wickers	Edwin Flack Oval, Berwick	MPNFL	1903	2015-2018	7	1925, 1954, 1977, 1978, 1999, **2015, 2017, 2018**	Moved to **Outer East FNL** in 2019
Cranbourne		Eagles	Livingston Recreation Reserve, Cranbourne East	MPNFL	1889	2015-2018	12	1926, 1951, 1966, 1985, 1986, 1987, 1989, 1990, 1991, 1993, 1995, 2011, **2016**	Moved to **Outer East FNL** in 2019
Doveton		Doves	Robinson Reserve, Doveton	MPNFL	1959	2015-2018	7	1969, 1979, 1982, 1983, 1984, 1988, 2005	Moved to **Outer East FNL** in 2019
Narre Warren		Magpies	Kalora Park, Narre Warren North	MPNFL	1953	2015-2018	9	1957, 1973, 1992, 2006, 2007, 2008, 2010, 2012, 2013	Moved to **Outer East FNL** in 2019
Officer (ROC)		Kangaroos	Officer Recreation Reserve, Officer	MPNFL	1977	2015-2018	5	1955 (Rythdale-Cardinia), 1961 (Officer), 1995, 1996, 2002	Moved to **Outer East FNL** in 2019
Pakenham		Lions	Toomuc Reserve, Pakenham	MPNFL	1892	2015-2018	30	1908, 1914, 1924, 1925, 1926, 1927, 1929, 1935, 1936, 1947, 1948, 1951, 1952, 1955, 1956, 1957, 1961, 1962, 1972, 1973, 1974, 1982, 1987, 1988, 1989, 1990, 1998, 2000, 2002, 2009	Moved to **Outer East FNL** in 2019
Tooradin-Dalmore		Seagulls	Tooradin Recreation Reserve, Tooradin	MPNFL	1922	2015-2018	10	1956, 1958, 1970, 1971, 1972, 1975, 1977, 1984, 1985, 1997	Moved to the **West Gippsland FNC** for the 2019 season.

=== Former clubs ===
Club	Colours	Nickname	Home Ground	Former League	Est.	Years in SEFNL	Premierships		Fate
Club	Colours	Nickname	Home Ground	Former League	Est.	Years in SEFNL	Total	Years (SEFNL flags in bold)	Fate
Hampton Park		Redbacks	Robert Booth Reserve, Hampton Park	MPNFL	1959	2015-2017	**7**	1959, 1960, 1963, 1967, 1968, 1997, 1998	Transferred to the **Southern FNL** in 2018

== Premiers ==
Year	Premiers		Runners-up		Venue	Date	Ref
Year	Club	Score	Club	Score	Venue	Date	Ref
2015	Berwick (1)	17.17 (119)	Cranbourne (1)	13.11 (89)	Officer Recreation Reserve	19 September 2015	
2016	Cranbourne (1)	15.9 (99)	Berwick (1)	9.11 (65)	Officer Recreation Reserve	17 September 2016	
2017	Berwick (2)	15.9 (99)	Narre Warren (1)	5.12 (42)	Holm Park Reserve	16 September 2017	
2018	Berwick (3)	8.25 (73)	Narre Warren (2)	2.10 (22)	Edwin Flack Reserve	15 September 2018	
