= Neerim-Neerim South Football Club =

Neerim-Neerim South

Names
- Full name: Neerim-Neerim South Football Netball Club
- Nickname(s): Cats
- Motto: "Don't stop relaxin"

Club details
- Founded: 1954 (Merger)
- Colours: Blue White
- Competition: Ellinbank & District Football League
- Premierships: 1962, 1964, 1966, 1978, 1982, 1998, 1999, 2022
- Ground(s): Bill Cumming Memorial Oval - Neerim South Rec Reserve

Neerim-Neerim South Football Club, nicknamed The Cats, is an Australian rules football club in the Ellinbank & District Football League. The club is based in the regional town of Neerim South, in the Gippsland region of Victoria, Australia.

In 2015 the club formed the 'Neerim District Junior Football Club' to field Under 10, Under 12 and Under 14 teams in the Warragul District Junior Football League

== History ==
Former Neerim District Football Association clubs Neerim and Neerim South merged so they could be more competitive in the Ellinbank & District Football League in 1954. Prior to joining the EDFL the two clubs were part of the Neerim District Football Association with local clubs Jindivick, Neerim East. and later Noojee and Neerim Junction. After the merge they contested their first grand final in 1959, but lost by 16 points to Nilma Lillico. Another grand final loss in 1960 to Warragul Industrials, but when the Cats next reached the grand final in 1962 it was a case of third time lucky as they triumphed over their conquerors of two seasons earlier. The Cats won further flags in 1964 and 1966.

The next two decades both yielded a single premiership, while the club won back to back premierships in 1998 and 1999.

Due to the 2020 Coronavirus (COVID-19) pandemic, The Ellinbank & District FL abandoned all its competitions for season 2020 meaning Neerim-Neerim South along with the 9 other EDFL clubs didn't play an official match that year.

The club went through the 2022 EDFNL season undefeated and claimed the minor premiership. They lost the 1st Semi Final to Buln Buln by 15 points but continued into the Grand Final with an 8 point win over Ellinbank. Neerim-Neerim South won the 2022 EDFNL premiership by 1 point over Buln Buln, this was the club's 8th premiership, the game was played at Dowton Park in Yarragon.

== Premierships ==
Ellinbank & District Football League

- 1962, 1964, 1966, 1978, 1982, 1998, 1999, 2022

OTHER GRADES

- Reserves (1963, 1964, 1966, 1985, 1986, 1994, 2012, 2017)
- Thirds - U18's (1964, 1969, 1970, 1971, 1979, 1984, 1985, 1986, 1989, 1993, 1995, 1996, 2014, 2018, 2022)
- Fourths - U16's (2009)

== VFL/AFL players ==
- Barry Bourke - Melbourne
- Erich Lissenden - AFL North Melbourne

== Book ==
The Merger - History of the Neerim-Neerim South Football Club
