= Mornington Peninsula Football Netball League =

- Formerly: Mornington Peninsula Nepean Football League
- Sport: Australian rules football
- Founded: 1987; 39 years ago
- No. of teams: 22
- Country: Australia
- Confederation: AFL South East
- Most recent champions: Div 1: Dromana (5); Div 2: Red Hill (3) (2026)
- Most titles: Frankston YCW (14)
- Level on pyramid: 2
- Promotion to: MPFNL Division 1
- Relegation to: MPFNL Division 2
- Related competitions: Mornington Peninsula FL, Nepean FL, South West Gippsland FL, SEWF, South East FNL
- Website: MPFNL site

The Mornington Peninsula Football Netball League (MPFNL), formerly known as the Mornington Peninsula Nepean Football League (MPNFL), is an Australian rules football competition, governed by the AFL South East. The MPFNL contains teams near the southeastern region of Melbourne, Victoria.

At the end of the 2017 season, the competition was restructured from a geographical to a divisional structure, with promotion/relegation. It contains two divisions with 22 teams in all, 10 in Division 1 and 12 in Division 2.

== History ==
The league was formed in 1987 upon the merger of the Mornington Peninsula FL and the Nepean FL. Football on the Peninsula region goes back to 1897, and in 2008 celebrated its centenary.

The first official league, the Peninsula FA, was formed in 1908. This competition played until 1933, and then it merged with the Peninsula District FA (formed in 1920) to form the Mornington Peninsula FL for the 1934 season. Clubs from the small Peninsula Junior FL also joined.

In late 1958 the league's committee allowed Chelsea to transfer in from the Federal FL, couple with the fact the league was in the growth corridor of suburban Melbourne the league decided on a new approach to the competition. It would form a major and minor league competitions. A new Nepean League would be for clubs that only had one open age side. The Mornington Peninsula league would have both seniors and reserves competitions.

The 1958 league ran A, B, & C grade competitions with 28 teams from 18 clubs. Some clubs were directed into the Nepean FL in 1959, and after a few years of promotion and relegation the two leagues merged in 1987.

The competition absorbed the South West Gippsland FL in 1995.

Division One 1987-94; Premier League 1995-2004; Peninsula League 2005–present
Division Two 1987-94; Southern Division 1995-98; Nepean Division 1999-2004; Nepean League 2005–present
Northern Division 1995-98; Peninsula Division 1999-2004; Casey-Cardinia League 2005–2014

At the end of 2014 the Casey-Cardinia division broke away to form their own competition.

At the end of 2017, it was announced that the divisions would be reworked into a two tier relegation-promotion system, with 10 teams in Division 1, and 12 in Division 2, with the premiers of Division 2 replacing the bottom placed team of Division 1.

2008 the underdog pups beat heavily backed favourites Narre Warren in the grand final of the under 18 colts comp.

== Clubs ==
=== Locations ===
Locations of the 2025 (men's) MPFNL clubs. Red indicates clubs in Division 1, yellow clubs in Division 2.

=== Men ===
==== Division One ====
Club	Colours	Nickname	Home ground	Former league	Founded	Years in MPFNL	MPFNL senior premierships	
Club	Colours	Nickname	Home ground	Former league	Founded	Years in MPFNL	Total	Most recent
Devon Meadows		Panthers	Glover Reserve, Devon Meadows	SWGFL	1977	1995-	1	2025
Dromana		Tigers	Dromana Recreation Reserve, Dromana	NFL	1896	1987-	5	2026
Edithvale-Aspendale		Eagles	Regents Park, Aspendale	MPFL	1921	1987-	7	2024
Frankston YCW		Stonecats	Jubilee Park, Frankston	NFL	1967	1987-	14	2022
Langwarrin		Kangaroos	Lloyd Park, Langwarrin	NFL	1920	1987-	4	2022
Mornington		Bulldogs	Alexandra Park, Mornington	MPFL	1888	1987-	5	2023
Mount Eliza		Redlegs	Emil Madsen Reserve, Mount Eliza	MPFL	1964	1987-	4	2024
Red Hill		Hillmen	Red Hill Recreation Reserve, Red Hill	NFL	1929	1987-	3	2026
Rosebud		Buds	Olympic Park, Rosebud	NFL	1929	1987-	5	2025
Sorrento		Sharks	David Macfarlane Reserve, Sorrento	MPFL	1908	1987-	7	2017

==== Division Two ====
Club	Colours	Nickname	Home ground	Former league	Founded	Years in MPFNL	MPFNL senior premierships	
Club	Colours	Nickname	Home ground	Former league	Founded	Years in MPFNL	Total	Most recent
Bonbeach		Sharks	Bonbeach Sports Reserve, Bonbeach	NFL	1961	1987-	0	-
Chelsea		Seagulls	Chelsea Recreation Reserve, Chelsea	MPFL	1919	1987-	4	2006
Crib Point		Magpies	Crib Point Recreation Reserve, Crib Point	NFL	1931	1987-	1	2001
Frankston Bombers		Bombers	Baxter Park, Frankston South	MPFL	1885	1987-	2	2009
Hastings		Blues	Hastings Park, Hastings	MPFL	1889	1987-	3	2016
Karingal		Bulls	Ballam Park, Frankston	NFL	1963	1987-	2	1999
Pearcedale		Panthers	Pearcedale Recreation Reserve, Pearcedale	NFL	1898	1987-	3	2003
Pines		Pythons	Eric Bell Reserve, Frankston North	MPFL	1964	1987-	3	2018
Rye		Demons	RJ Rowley Reserve, Rye	MPFL	1945	1987-	1	2006
Seaford		Tigers	RF Miles Recreation Reserve, Seaford	MPFL	1921	1987-	3	2009
Somerville		Eagles	Somerville Recreation Reserve, Somerville	NFL	1892	1987-	0	-
Tyabb		Yabbies	Bunguyan Reserve, Tyabb	NFL	1899	1987-	1	2000

=== Women ===
==== Division One/Division 1 reserves ====
Club	Colours	Nickname	Home ground	Former league	Founded	Years in MPFNL	SEWF/MPFNL senior premierships	
Club	Colours	Nickname	Home ground	Former league	Founded	Years in MPFNL	Total	Most recent
Bonbeach		Sharks	Bonbeach Reserve, Bonbeach	SEWF	1961	2024-	1	2024
Frankston		Dolphins	Kinetic Stadium, Frankston	SEWF	1887	2024-	1	2024
Hastings/Balnarring		Thunder	Balnarring Reserve, Balnarring	–	2024	2024-	2	2025
Karingal		Bulls	Ballam Park, Frankston	SEWF	1963	2024-	1	2019
Mornington		Bulldogs	Alexandra Oval, Mornington	SEWF	1888	2024-	3	2026
Pearcedale		Panthers	Pearcedale Recreation Reserve, Pearcedale	SEWF	1898	2024-	1	2023
Tyabb		Yabbies	Bunguyan Reserve, Tyabb	SEWF	1899	2024-	1	2019
Warragul Industrials		Dusties	Western Park, Warragul	SEWF	1948	2024-	2	2024

==== Division Two ====
Club	Colours	Nickname	Home ground	Former league	Founded	Years in MPFNL	SEWF/MPFNL senior premierships	
Club	Colours	Nickname	Home ground	Former league	Founded	Years in MPFNL	Total	Most recent
Bass Coast		Breakers	Dalyston Recreation Reserve, Dalyston	SEWF	2017	2024-	1	2018
Chelsea		Seagulls	Chelsea Recreation Reserve, Chelsea	–	1919	2025-	1	2026
Crib Point		Magpies	Crib Point Recreation Reserve, Crib Point	–	1931	2025-	0	–
Edithvale-Aspendale		Eagles	Regents Park, Aspendale	SEWF	1921	2024-	0	–
Langwarrin		Kangaroos	Lloyd Park, Langwarrin	–	1920	2025-	0	–
Mount Eliza		Redlegs	Emil Madsen Reserve, Mount Eliza	–	1964	2025-	0	–
Red Hill		Hillmen	Red Hill Recreation Reserve, Red Hill	SEWF	1929	2024-	0	–
Pines		Pythons	Eric Bell Reserve, Frankston North	SEWF	1964	2024-	0	–
Rye		Demons	RJ Rowley Reserve, Rye	SEWF	1945	2024-	0	–

=== Women's teams in recess ===
Club	Colours	Nickname	Home ground	Former league	Founded	Years in MPFNL	SEWF/MPFNL senior premierships	
Club	Colours	Nickname	Home ground	Former league	Founded	Years in MPFNL	Total	Most recent
Seaford		Tigers	RF Miles Recreation Reserve, Seaford	SEWF	1921	2024	1	2022
Sorrento		Sharks	David Macfarlane Reserve, Sorrento	SEWF	1908	2024	0	-

== Former teams ==
Club	Colours	Nickname	Home ground	Former league	Founded	Years in MPFNL	Senior premierships		Fate
Club	Colours	Nickname	Home ground	Former league	Founded	Years in MPFNL	Total	Most recent	Fate
Beaconsfield		Eagles	Holm Park, Beaconsfield	WGFL	1890	2002-2014	3	2014	Formed South East FNL following 2014 season
Berwick		Wickers	Edwin Flack Oval, Berwick	SWGFL	1903	1995-2014	0	-	Formed South East FNL following 2014 season
Carrum		Lions	Roy Dore Reserve, Carrum	MPFL	1909	1987-1995	1	1994	Folded after 1995 season, reformed as Carrum-Patterson Lakes in Southern FNL in 2013
Carrum Downs		Falcons	Carrum Downs Recreation Reserve, Carrum Downs	SFNL		2000-2005	0	-	Folded after 2005 season
Cranbourne		Eagles	Livingston Recreation Reserve, Cranbourne East	SWGFL	1889	1995-2014	2	2011	Formed South East FNL following 2014 season
Dingley		Dingoes	Souter Oval, Dingley Village	SWGFL	1958	1995-2006	0	-	Moved to Southern FNL following 2006 season
Doveton		Doves	Robinson Reserve, Doveton	SWGFL	1959	1995-2014	1	2005	Formed South East FNL following 2014 season
Hampton Park		Redbacks	Robert Booth Reserve, Hampton Park	SWGFL	1959	1995-2014	2	1998	Formed South East FNL following 2014 season
Keysborough		Burras	Rowley Allan Reserve, Keysborough	SWGFL	1946	1995-2014	0	-	Moved to Southern FNL following 2014 season
Narre Warren		Magpies	Kalora Park, Narre Warren North	SWGFL	1953	1995-2014	6	2013	Formed South East FNL following 2014 season
Pakenham		Lions	Toomuc Reserve, Pakenham	WGFL	1892	2002-2014	2	2009	Formed South East FNL following 2014 season
Officer		Kangaroos	Officer Recreation Reserve, Officer	WGLFL	1977	2005-2014	0	-	Formed South East FNL following 2014 season
Tooradin-Dalmore		Seagulls	Tooradin Recreation Reserve, Tooradin	WGLFL	1922	2005-2014	0	-	Formed South East FNL following 2014 season

== Recent Premierships ==
=== Peninsula Division/Division 1 ===
Season	Premiers	Score	Runner-up	Score
1987	Chelsea	26.13 (169)	Pines	13.12 (90)
1988	Pines	14.10 (94)	Edithvale-Aspendale	12.13 (85)
1989	Edithvale-Aspendale	20.13 (133)	Chelsea	11.7 (73)
1990	Chelsea	26.13 (169)	Edithvale-Aspendale	16.10 (106)
1991	Frankston YCW	14.10 (94)	Pines	10.11 (71)
1992	Frankston YCW	24.8 (152)	Chelsea	11.7 (73)
1993	Frankston YCW	13.7 (85)	Chelsea	7.7 (49)
1994	Pines	18.10 (118)	Frankston YCW	12.14 (86)
1995	Hastings	17.13 (115)	Pines	13.10 (88)
1996	Mornington	14.8 (92)	Pines	11.11 (77)
1997	Frankston YCW	10.10 (70)	Mornington	9.13 (67)
1998	Mornington	21.17 (143)	Edithvale-Aspendale	15.11 (101)
1999	Edithvale-Aspendale	19.11 (125)	Mornington	18.7 (115)
2000	Edithvale-Aspendale	24.20 (164)	Mornington	9.11 (65)
2001	Mornington	33.14 (212)	Hastings	12.11 (83)
2002	Edithvale-Aspendale	21.14 (140)	Pines	17.6 (108)
2003	Frankston YCW	17.14 (116)	Mornington	9.7 (61)
2004	Mornington	14.12 (96)	Chelsea	8.10 (58)
2005	Mount Eliza	27.17 (179)	Frankston YCW	7.5 (47)
2006	Chelsea	10.18 (78)	Mount Eliza	8.8 (56)
2007	Seaford	15.11 (101)	Frankston YCW	6.15 (51)
2008	Seaford	17.17 (119)	Edithvale-Aspendale	12.17 (89)
2009	Seaford	21.18 (144)	Edithvale-Aspendale	12.15 (87)
2010	Frankston YCW	16.11 (107)	Seaford	9.9 (63)
2011	Frankston YCW	19.14 (128)	Karingal	9.5 (59)
2012	Frankston YCW	12.6 (78)	Mt Eliza	9.14 (68)
2013	Edithvale-Aspendale	13.15 (93)	Bonbeach	12.14 (86)
2014	Frankston YCW	8.15 (63)	Mornington	8.9 (57)
2015	Frankston YCW	18.15 (123)	Mornington	5.6 (36)
2016	Frankston YCW	10.9 (69)	Mt Eliza	7.5 (47)
2017	Frankston YCW	21.11 (137)	Bonbeach	5.5 (35)
2018	Pines	14.12 (96)	Sorrento	14.11 (95)
2019	Dromana	8.4 (52)	Sorrento	6.9 (45)
2022	Frankston YCW	10.11 (71)	Bonbeach	6.9 (45)
2023	Dromana	14.13 (97)	Frankston YCW	6.7 (43)
2024	Mt Eliza	12.3 (75)	Dromana	7.10 (52)
2025	Rosebud	8.7 (55)	Mt Eliza	7.12 (54)
2026	Dromana	12.13 (85)	Rosebud	12.8 (80)

Summary of Division One/Premier League/Peninsula League Premierships since 1987:

- 13 Frankston YCW
- 5 Edithvale-Aspendale
- 4 Mornington
- 3 Pines
- 3 Chelsea
- 3 Dromana
- 3 Seaford
- 2 Mt Eliza
- 1 Hastings
- 1 Rosebud

=== Nepean Division/Division 2 ===
Season	Premiers	Score	Runner-up	Score
1987	Edithvale-Aspendale	16.11 (113)	Rosebud	13.11 (89)
1988	Rosebud	14.9 (93)	Frankston YCW	11.15 (81)
1989	Frankston YCW	24.8 (152)	Karingal	14.7 (91)
1990	Red Hill	16.7 (103)	Karingal	9.9 (63)
1991	Frankston Bombers	7.10 (52)	Rosebud	5.5 (35)
1992	Hastings	14.12 (96)	Rosebud	9.9 (63)
1993	Langwarrin	14.13 (97)	Carrum	15.6 (96)
1994	Carrum	15.8 (98)	Rosebud	13.8 (86)
1995	Pearcedale	18.13 (121)	Rosebud	13.9 (87)
1996	Pearcedale	22.15 (147)	Mount Eliza	16.6 (102)
1997	Rosebud	24.20 (164)	Devon Meadows	12.9 (81)
1998	Mount Eliza	18.14 (122)	Pearcedale	15.7 (97)
1999	Berwick	15.9 (99)	Crib Point	13.10 (88)
2000	Tyabb	20.9 (129)	Keysborough	10.15 (75)
2001	Crib Point	23.10 (148)	Pearcedale	10.11 (71)
2002	Langwarrin	17.11 (113)	Pearcedale	15.9 (39)
2003	Pearcedale	18.9 (117)	Bonbeach	7.4 (46)
2004	Sorrento	6.10 (46)	Bonbeach	6.9 (45)
2005	Langwarrin	13.9 (87)	Frankston Bombers	11.14 (80)
2006	Rye	16.9 (105)	Langwarrin	16.6 (102)
2007	Rosebud	18.10 (118)	Frankston Bombers	11.13 (79)
2008	Sorrento	13.8 (86)	Dromana	9.8 (62)
2009	Frankston Bombers	13.18 (96)	Sorrento	8.11 (59)
2010	Sorrento	17.16 (118)	Somerville	11.7 (73)
2011	Sorrento	13.8 (86)	Hastings	13.7 (85)
2012	Sorrento	10.13 (73)	Dromana	10.11 (71)
2013	Dromana	20.8 (128)	Sorrento	7.7 (49)
2014	Sorrento	15.10 (100)	Crib Point	5.12 (42)
2015	Rosebud	13.14 (92)	Somerville	10.12 (72)
2016	Hastings	11.15 (81)	Frankston Bombers	6.18 (54)
2017	Sorrento	13.5 (83)	Frankston Bombers	10.9 (69)
2018	Dromana	10.7 (67)	Red Hill	9.5 (59)
2019	Red Hill	9.11 (65)	Karingal	4.3 (27)
2022	Langwarrin	10.9 (69)	Karingal	2.6 (18)
2023	Mornington	9.7 (61)	Somerville	7.10 (52)
2024	Edithvale-Aspendale	11.16 (82)	Chelsea	11.11 (77)
2025	Devon Meadows	10.6 (66)	Frankston Bombers	8.13 (61)
2026	Red Hill	11.7 (73)	Chelsea	6.9 (

Summary of Division Two/Southern Division/Nepean Division/Nepean League Premierships since 1987:

- 7 Sorrento
- 4 Rosebud
- 4 Langwarrin
- 3 Pearcedale
- 2 Dromana
- 2 Edithvale-Aspendale
- 2 Frankston Bombers
- 2 Hastings
- 2 Red Hill
- 1 Berwick
- 1 Carrum
- 1 Crib Point
- 1 Devon Meadows
- 1 Frankston YCW
- 1 Mount Eliza
- 1 Mornington
- 1 Rye
- 1 Tyabb

=== Casey-Cardinia Division ===
Season	Premiers	Score	Runner-up	Score
1995	Cranbourne	13.7 (85)	Karingal	11.11 (77)
1996	Karingal	17.9 (121)	Doveton	12.12 (84)
1997	Hampton Park	16.12 (108)	Doveton	14.10 (94)
1998	Hampton Park	17.13 (115)	Seaford	11.8 (74)
1999	Karingal	19.6 (120)	Doveton	15.13 (103)
2000	Chelsea	14.14 (98)	Seaford	12.11 (83)
2001	Mount Eliza	17.12 (114)	Frankston Bombers	11.2 (68)
2002	Pakenham	22.14 (146)	Narre Warren	9.8 (62)
2003	Beaconsfield	12.14 (86)	Pakenham	5.9 (39)
2004	Beaconsfield	13.13 (91)	Seaford	10.6 (66)
2005	Doveton	6.8 (44)	Narre Warren	5.7 (37)
2006	Narre Warren	16.17 (113)	Doveton	10.8 (68)
2007	Narre Warren	15.12 (102)	Pakenham	13.7 (85)
2008	Narre Warren	27.21 (183)	Keysborough	7.10 (52)
2009	Pakenham	15.14 (104)	Doveton	6.10 (46)
2010	Narre Warren	13.24 (102)	Beaconsfield	11.11 (77)
2011	Cranbourne	15.6 (96)	Narre Warren	10.15 (75)
2012	Narre Warren	22.13 (145)	Cranbourne	19.19 (123)
2013	Narre Warren	14.16 (100)	Cranbourne	15.9 (99)
2014	Beaconsfield	14.8 (92)	Cranbourne	5.8 (38)

Summary of Northern Division/Peninsula Division/Casey-Cardinia League Premierships since 1995:

- 6 Narre Warren
- 3 Beaconsfield
- 2 Cranbourne
- 2 Hampton Park
- 2 Karingal
- 2 Pakenham
- 1 Chelsea
- 1 Doveton
- 1 Mount Eliza

=== Women's Division 1 ===
Season	Premiers	Score	Runner-up	Score
2024	Warragul Industrials	7.3 (45)	Mornington	5.5 (35)
2025	Mornington	5.4 (34)	Warragul Industrials	0.5 (5)
2026	Mornington	5.6 (36)	Warragul Industrials	4.5 (29)

Summary of Women's Division 1 Premierships since 2024:

- 2 Mornington
- 1 Warragul Industrials

=== Women's Division 2 ===
Season	Premiers	Score	Runner-up	Score
2024	Bonbeach	3.6 (24)	Edithvale-Aspendale	1.4 (10)
2025	Red Hill/Balnarring	7.4 (46)	Edithvale-Aspendale	2.1 (13)
2026	Chelsea	4.5 (29)	Pines	1.4 (10)

Summary of Women's Division 2 Premierships since 2024:

- 1 Bonbeach
- 1 Chelsea
- 1 Red Hill/Balnarring

=== Women's Division 3 ===
Season	Premiers	Score	Runner-up	Score
2024	Frankston	2.4 (16)	Seaford	1.4 (10)
2025	Chelsea	4.1 (25)	Crib Point	1.1 (7)
Recess since 2025

Summary of Women's Division 3 Premierships since 2024:

- 1 Frankston
- 1 Chelsea

=== Table of premierships ===
Men				Women		
Year	Division 1	Division 2	2 divisions (2015-)	Division 1	Division 2	Division 3
2026	Dromana	Red Hill	2 divisions (2015-)	Mornington	Chelsea	2 divs (2026-)
2025	Rosebud	Devon Meadows	2 divisions (2015-)	Mornington	Red Hill/Balnarring	Chelsea
2024	Mount Eliza	Edithvale-Aspendale	2 divisions (2015-)	Warragul Industrials	Bonbeach	Frankston
2023	Dromana	Mornington	2 divisions (2015-)	Before 2024 - South Eastern Women's Football		
2023	Dromana	Mornington	2 divisions (2015-)	Mornington	Pearcedale	2 divs (2023)
2022	Frankston YCW	Langwarrin	2 divisions (2015-)	Seaford	Warragul Industrials	Cerberus
2021	No finals due to COVID-19		2 divisions (2015-)	No finals due to COVID-19		
2020	No finals due to COVID-19		2 divisions (2015-)	No finals due to COVID-19		
2019	Dromana	Red Hill	2 divisions (2015-)	St Kilda Sharks	Tyabb	Karingal
2018	Pines	Dromana	2 divisions (2015-)	Eastern Devils	Bass Coast	Pearcedale
	Peninsula	Nepean	Casey-Cardinia	Eastern Devils	Beaconsfield	Tyabb
2017	Frankston YCW	Sorrento	Casey-Cardinia	Eastern Devils	Beaconsfield	Tyabb
2016	Frankston YCW	Hastings	2 divisions (2015-)			
2015	Frankston YCW	Rosebud	2 divisions (2015-)			
2014	Frankston YCW	Sorrento	Beaconsfield	3 divisions (1995-2014)		
2013	Edithvale-Aspendale	Dromana	Narre Warren	3 divisions (1995-2014)		
2012	Frankston YCW	Sorrento	Narre Warren	3 divisions (1995-2014)		
2011	Frankston YCW	Sorrento	Cranbourne	3 divisions (1995-2014)		
2010	Frankston YCW	Sorrento	Narre Warren	3 divisions (1995-2014)		
2009	Seaford	Frankston Bombers	Pakenham	3 divisions (1995-2014)		
2008	Seaford	Sorrento	Narre Warren	3 divisions (1995-2014)		
2007	Seaford	Rosebud	Narre Warren	3 divisions (1995-2014)		
2006	Chelsea	Rye	Narre Warren	3 divisions (1995-2014)		
2005	Mount Eliza	Langwarrin	Doveton	3 divisions (1995-2014)		
	Premier	Peninsula	Nepean	3 divisions (1995-2014)		
2004	Mornington	Sorrento	Beaconsfield	3 divisions (1995-2014)		
2003	Frankston YCW	Pearcedale	Beaconsfield	3 divisions (1995-2014)		
2002	Edithvale-Aspendale	Langwarrin	Pakenham	3 divisions (1995-2014)		
2001	Mornington	Crib Point	Mount Eliza	3 divisions (1995-2014)		
2000	Edithvale-Aspendale	Tyabb	Chelsea	3 divisions (1995-2014)		
1999	Edithvale-Aspendale	Berwick	Karingal	3 divisions (1995-2014)		
	Premier	Southern	Northern	3 divisions (1995-2014)		
1998	Mornington	Mount Eliza	Hampton Park	3 divisions (1995-2014)		
1997	Frankston YCW	Rosebud	Hampton Park	3 divisions (1995-2014)		
1996	Mornington	Pearcedale	Karingal	3 divisions (1995-2014)		
1995	Hastings	Pearcedale	Cranbourne	3 divisions (1995-2014)		
	Division 1	Division 2	2 divisions (1987-94)			
1994	Pines	Carrum	2 divisions (1987-94)			
1993	Frankston YCW	Langwarrin	2 divisions (1987-94)			
1992	Frankston YCW	Hastings	2 divisions (1987-94)			
1991	Frankston YCW	Frankston Bombers	2 divisions (1987-94)			
1990	Chelsea	Red Hill	2 divisions (1987-94)			
1989	Edithvale-Aspendale	Frankston YCW	2 divisions (1987-94)			
1988	Pines	Rosebud	2 divisions (1987-94)			
1987	Chelsea	Edithvale-Aspendale	2 divisions (1987-94)			
