= Bunyip Football Club =

Australian Football Club

Bunyip
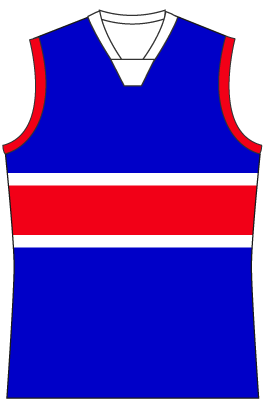

Names
- Full name: Bunyip Football Netball Club
- Nickname: Bulldogs

Club details
- Founded: 1879
- Colours: Blue Red White
- Competition: Ellinbank & District Football League
- Premierships: 1905,1909,1912,1915,1936,1938,1939,1945 1990, 2000, 2012
- Ground: Bunyip Recreation Reserve

Bunyip Football Club, nicknamed The Bulldogs, is an Australian rules football club in the Ellinbank & District Football League. The club is based in the small town of Bunyip, in the Gippsland region of Victoria, Australia.

== History ==
When the West Gippsland FA became the Central Gippsland FL in 1909, Bunyip won the competition first flag. The club stayed in the Central gippsland league until 1926 when it became a founding member of the West Gippsland FL.The club won three flags in the WGFL, including the 1939 flag when their rivals, Garfield did not turn up because it was raining. Reforming after the war the 1945 premiership was the last in the WGFL, rival town's population was growing at a faster rate and Bunyip found the competition was too hard. In 1982 the club transferred to the Ellinbank & District Football League, playing against town sides that were similar in size, the club has won three premierships, 1990, 2000,& 2012. In the 2016 AFL Gippsland review, Bunyip FC moved to the newly revived West Gippsland Competition along with teams from the Ellinbank & District FL and the Alberton FL. Bunyip struggled throughout the time spent in the West Gippsland Competition and in 2025 moved back to the Ellinbank & District FL.

== Premierships ==
Central Gippsland Football Association

- 1905

Central Gippsland Football League

- 1909, 1912, 1915

Bunyip Neerim FA

- 1936

West Gippsland Football League

- 1938, 1939, 1945

Ellinbank & District Football League

- 1990, 2000, 2012

== VFL/AFL ==
- Shane Mumford - Geelong, Sydney, Greater Western Sydney
- Ben Ross - North Melbourne, Hawthorn
- Michael Ross - Essendon
- Tom Papley - Sydney
- Herman Bartlett - Fitzroy, Carlton
