= Drouin Football Club =

Australian football and netball club

Drouin

Names
- Full name: Drouin Football and Netball Club
- Nickname: Hawks

Club details
- Founded: 1890; 136 years ago
- Colours
- Competition: Gippsland League
- President: Luke Gilbert
- Coach: Jordan Kingi
- Premierships: (8): 1941, 1946, 1949, 1958, 1967, 1978, 1991, 1992
- Ground: Drouin Recreation Reserve

Uniforms
Home

Other information
- Official website: websites.mygameday.app/club_info.cgi?c=0-6208-81026-0-0%2F

The Drouin Football and Netball Club, nicknamed the Hawks, is an Australian rules football and netball club based in the city of the same name in the state of Victoria.

The club teams currently compete in the Gippsland League, fielding Senior, Reserve, Under 18 and Under 16 football teams, as well as A, B, C Grade and Under 17, Under 15 and Under 13 netball teams.

== Season summaries ==
| Season | P | W | L | D | For | Against | % | Pos. |
|---|---|---|---|---|---|---|---|---|
| 2009 | 16 | 9 | 7 | 0 | 1503 | 1339 | 112.25 | 4th |
| 2010 | 16 | 10 | 6 | 0 | 1634 | 1157 | 141.23 | 4th |
| 2011 | 18 | 12 | 5 | 1 | 1788 | 1456 | 122.80 | 2nd |
| 2012 | 18 | 7 | 11 | 0 | 1378 | 1643 | 83.87 | 7th |
| 2013 | 18 | 1 | 17 | 0 | 935 | 2275 | 41.10 | 9th |
| 2014 | 18 | 0 | 18 | 0 | 369 | 2791 | 13.22 | 10th |
| 2015 | 18 | 7 | 11 | 0 | 1408 | 1644 | 85.64 | 7th |
| 2016 | 18 | 8 | 9 | 1 | 1213 | 1502 | 80.76 | 5th |
| 2017 | 18 | 0 | 18 | 1 | 1213 | 1502 | 33.33 | 10th |
| 2018 | 18 | 4 | 13 | 1 | 1120 | 1631 | 68.67 | 8th |
| 2019 | 18 | 8 | 10 | 0 | 1128 | 1584 | 71.21 | 8th |
| 2020 | season abandoned | | | | | | | |
| 2021 | 10 | 5 | 5 | 0 | 627 | 813 | 77.12 | 6th |
| 2022 | 18 | 2 | 16 | 0 | 959 | 1913 | 50.13 | 10th |
| 2023 | 18 | 2 | 16 | 0 | 1232 | 1817 | 65.60 | 10th |

== VFL/ AFL players ==
The following footballers played with Drouin prior to making their VFL/AFL debut.

- 1982 - Gary Ablett Sr. (Hawthorn, Geelong)
- 2000 - Luke Ablett (Sydney)
- 2005 - Dale Thomas (Collingwood, Carlton)
- 2016 - Anthony McDonald-Tipungwuti (Essendon)
