= Devon Meadows Football Club =

Devon Meadows

Names
- Full name: Devon Meadows Football Netball Club
- Nickname: Panthers

Club details
- Founded: 1977; 48 years ago
- Colours
- Competition: MPNFL
- Coach: Ryan Hendy
- Premierships: 1, (2025)
- Ground: Glover Reserve

Uniforms
Home

Other information
- Official website: dmfnc.com.au

The Devon Meadows Football Netball Club, nicknamed the Panthers, is an Amateur Australian rules football and netball club based in Devon Meadows, Victoria. The football team currently competes in the Mornington Peninsula Nepean Football League (MPNFL) and was established in 1977.

== History ==
The club competed in their first season in the South West Gippsland Football League in 1979. That league merged with the Mornington Peninsula Nepean Football League (MPNFL) in 1995.

The Seniors, Reserves and Under 19s currently play in the Nepean Division of Mornington Peninsula Nepean Football League (MPNFL) since moving from Casey-Cardinia Division in 2012. While the Juniors play in the Mornington Peninsula Junior Football League.

== Current Grounds, Teams and Leagues ==
The senior team is coached by Dean Kent and Ryan Hendy. The reserves team is coached by Tom May and Sam Hurdiss. The under 19s is coached by Andrew Oldmeadow. There are currently 26 Teams Competing for Devon Meadows ranging from Auskick all the way up to Seniors & a Veterans side.

The traditional ground for the team is Glover Recreation Reserve, located on Browns Road in Devon Meadows. The ground is 5 minutes from the Botanic Ridge & Settlers Run estates.

Whilst the ground was being upgraded to its current quality surface, the Seniors, Reserves and Under 19s sometimes played games at the E.G Allen Oval located in the centre of nearby Cranbourne at the Racecourse, which is only a 5-minute drive from Devon Meadows

== Club song ==
Panther Land (to the tune of the Richmond Football Club Song)

Oh we're from Panther Land
The Mighty football team from Panther Land
In any weather you will see us with a grin
Risking head and chin
We'll fight and fight until we drop
and then we'll fight again
Oh we're from Panther Land
We're never beaten till' the final sirens gone
Oh we're the Panthers of old
We're strong and we're bold
Oh we're from Panther
Red, white and black
Oh we're from Panther Land

== Premierships and Titles ==
The Seniors won their first premiership in 2025 defeating the Frankston Bombers 10.6 (66) to 8.13 (61)

The most Recent Premierships for the club have been:

- 2023 - U/15's
- 2015 - Reserves
- 2009 - U/16's
- 2008 - U/13's and U/14's
