= Gippsland League =

Australian rules football and netball league

Gippsland Football League
- Formerly: West Gippsland Latrobe Football League
- Sport: Australian rules football
- First season: 1954
- No. of teams: 10
- Country: Australia
- Most recent champion: Moe (3)
- Most titles: Traralgon (21)
- Website: gippslandleague.com.au

The Gippsland League (GL), formerly known as the West Gippsland Latrobe Football League (WGLFL), is an Australian rules football and netball league in the Gippsland region of Victoria. It is considered the only AFL Victoria major league in Gippsland.

== History ==
Scene of the Traralgon v Moe match, 2010

The original Gippsland Football Association was formed in 1889, after a meeting of club delegates from the towns of Hazelwood, Morwell, Rosedale, Thorpdale, Traralgon, and Yarram. The association was open to any clubs from the Gippsland area and would be responsible for arranging matches between clubs and dealing with club disputes.

The Gippsland Football Netball League (GFNL) has roots dating back to the Central Gippsland Football League (CGFL) which was founded in 1909 with many former CGFL clubs now part of the GFNL.

The CGFL morphed into the Latrobe Valley Football League in 1954. The promoters of the LVFL wanted to have a league that consisted of towns along the Orbost railway line, from Warragul to Sale. "The background of the move, as reported on several occasions in this journal, is (1) to remove unbalances in the present population strengths of the towns at present fielding teams in the Central Gippsland Football League; (2) to link up with towns with the same community of interest; (3) to uplift the standard of football, by bringing the strongest clubs into competition; (4) to strengthen clubs financially through expected enhanced gates."

Three clubs from south Gippsland towns, Leongatha, Korumburra and Mirboo North, were therefore barred from joining the new league and went on to form the South Gippsland FL. The Central Gippsland Football League actually folded, when seven clubs joined the new La Trobe Valley Football League and due to their geographical location these three remaining clubs chose not to join the La Trobe Valley Football League. These three clubs then joined the South Gippsland Football League in 1954, with Leongatha entering two senior teams – Green & Gold.

The LVFL changed its name, in 1995, to the Gippsland Latrobe FL.

At the end of 2001, the West Gippsland FL and the Gippsland Latrobe FL had an administrative merger. This created a two-division competition and a name change to the West Gippsland Latrobe FL.

From 2002 until 2004, the league comprised a premier division, consisting mainly of the former Gippsland-Latrobe clubs, and a western division, comprising most of the former WGFL clubs.

After the 2004 season, the western division was dissolved, with Warragul, Drouin and Garfield joining the premier league. The remaining clubs from the western division moved to other competitions, such as the Alberton Football League, Ellinbank & District Football League and the Mornington Peninsula Nepean Football League.

In 2009, Garfield left the GFL for the Ellinbank & District Football League, whilst Wonthaggi and Bairnsdale joined the GFL in 2010 and 2011 respectively.

The Latrobe Valley area does not have a team participating in the Victorian Football League. Traralgon competed in the VFL during 1996–97, winning just four matches across those two years, before returning to the regional competition. The region does have a representative team in the TAC Cup Under-18 competition, Gippsland Power.

== Clubs ==
=== Locations ===
Club	Colours	Moniker	Home venue	Former League	Est.	Years in GL	GL Premierships	
Club	Colours	Moniker	Home venue	Former League	Est.	Years in GL	Total	Years
Bairnsdale		Redlegs	Bairnsdale City Oval, Bairnsdale	GFL, EGFNL	1877	1960-1998, 2011-	1	1981
Drouin		Hawks	Drouin Recreation Reserve, Drouin	WGFL	1903	1960-1965, 2005-	0	-
Leongatha		Parrots	Leongatha Recreation Reserve, Leongatha	SGFL	1894	1969-	13	1970, 1977, 1979, 1982, 1989, 1995, 1997, 2001, 2017, 2018, 2022, 2023, 2025
Maffra		Eagles	Maffra Recreation Reserve, Maffra	GFL	1877	1960-	9	2002, 2003, 2004, 2006, 2007, 2009, 2010, 2016, 2019
Moe		Lions	Ted Summerton Reserve, Moe	CGFL	1888	1954-	3	1956, 1967, 2026
Morwell		Tigers	Morwell Recreation Reserve, Morwell	CGFL	1883	1954-	9	1961, 1966, 1983, 1985, 1988, 1993, 1996, 2013, 2014
Sale		Magpies	Sale Oval, Sale	GFL	1877	1954-	10	1954, 1955, 1957, 1959, 1971, 1973, 1975, 1986, 2008, 2012
Traralgon		Maroons	Traralgon Recreation Reserve, Traralgon	CGFL	1883	1954-	21	1960, 1963, 1964, 1965, 1968, 1969, 1972, 1978, 1980, 1987, 1990, 1991, 1992, 1994, 1998, 1999, 2000, 2005, 2011, 2015, 2024
Warragul		Gulls	Western Park Reserve, Warragul	WGFL	1879	1954-1999, 2002-	3	1974, 1976, 1984
Wonthaggi		Power	Wonthaggi Recreation Reserve, Wonthaggi	AFNL	2004	2010-	0	-

== Former clubs ==
Club	Jumper	Nickname	Home Ground	Former League	Est.	Years in GL	GL Premierships		Fate
Club	Jumper	Nickname	Home Ground	Former League	Est.	Years in GL	Total	Years	Fate
Churchill		Kangaroos	Gaskin Park, Churchill	MGFNL	1888	1984–1994	0	-	Moved to North Gippsland FNL following 1994 season
Garfield		Stars	Garfield Recreation Reserve, Garfield	WGFL	1935	2005–2009	0	-	Moved to Ellinbank & District FNL following 2009 season
Heyfield		Kangaroos	Gordon St Recreation Reserve, Heyfield	GFL	1882	1960–1974	0	-	Moved to North Gippsland FNL following 1974 season
Newborough		Bulldogs	Northern Reserve, Newborough	MGFNL	1970	1979–1985	0	-	Moved to Mid Gippsland FNL following 1985 season
Stratford		Swans	Stratford Recreation Reserve, Stratford	AFA, GFL	c.1900	1923–1933, 1949–1973	0	-	Moved to North Gippsland FNL following 1933 and 1974 seasons
Trafalgar		Bloods	Trafalgar Recreation Reserve, Trafalgar	CGFL	1888	1954–1968	2	1958, 1962	Moved to Mid Gippsland FNL following 1968 season
Traralgon Tyers United		Two Blues	Tyers Recreation Reserve, Tyers	NGFNL	1981	1983–1988	0	-	Moved to North Gippsland FNL following 1988 season
Wonthaggi		Blues	Wonthaggi Recreation Reserve, Wonthaggi	BVWDFL	1950	1995–2004	0	-	Merged with Wonthaggi Rovers to form Wonthaggi Power in Alberton FL following 2005 season
Yallourn		Blues	Yallourn Recreation Reserve, Yallourn	CGFL	1921	1954–1976	2	1932, 1933	Merged with Yallourn North to form Yallourn-Yallourn North following 1976 season
Yallourn Yallourn North		Bombers	Yallourn Recreation Reserve, Yallourn	–	1977	1977–1983	0	-	Moved to Mid Gippsland FNL following 1983 season
Yarragon		Magpies	Dowton Park Reserve, Yarragon	CGFL	1895	1954–1960	0	-	Moved to West Gippsland FL following 1960 season

=== Western Division ===
The Western Division began when the West Gippsland Football League merged with the Gippsland-La Trobe Football League following the 2001 season. It ran separately from the Premier Division, with no promotion or relegation between the two competitions. The division was wound up following the 2004 season, with Garfield, Drouin and Warragul joining the Premier Division and the other clubs moving to various local leagues.

==== Final clubs ====
Club	Jumper	Nickname	Home Ground	Former League	Est.	Years in GL	GL Premierships		Fate
Club	Jumper	Nickname	Home Ground	Former League	Est.	Years in GL	Total	Years	Fate
Cora Lynn		Cobras	Cora Lynn Recreation Reserve, Cora Lynn	WGFL	1913	2002–2004	0	-	Moved to Ellinbank & District FNL following 2004 season
Drouin		Hawks	Drouin Recreation Reserve, Drouin	WGFL	1890	2002–2004	0	-	Moved to Gippsland League following 2004 season
Garfield		Stars	Garfield Recreation Reserve, Garfield	WGFL	1935	2002–2004	1	2004	Moved to Gippsland League following 2004 season
Kilcunda-Bass		Panthers	Bass Recreation Reserve, Bass	WGFL	1957	2002–2004	0	-	Moved to Alberton FNL following 2004 season
Nar Nar Goon		Goons	Nar Nar Goon Recreation Reserve, Nar Nar Goon	WGFL	c.1900	2002–2004	0	-	Moved to Ellinbank & District FNL following 2004 season
Phillip Island		Bulldogs	Cowes Recreation Reserve, Cowes	WGFL	1932	2002–2004	0	-	Moved to Alberton FNL following 2004 season
Rythdale-Officer-Cardinia (ROC)		Kangaroos	Officer Recreation Reserve, Officer	WGFL	1977	2002–2004	1	2002	Moved to Mornington Peninsula Nepean FL following 2004 season
Warragul		Gulls	Western Park Reserve, Warragul	WGFL	1879	2002–2004	1	2003	Moved to Gippsland League following 2004 season
Tooradin-Dalmore		Seagulls	Tooradin Recreation Reserve, Tooradin	WGFL	1922	2002–2004	0	-	Moved to Mornington Peninsula Nepean FL following 2004 season

==== Former clubs ====
Club	Jumper	Nickname	Home Ground	Former League	Est.	Years in GL	GL Premierships		Fate
Club	Jumper	Nickname	Home Ground	Former League	Est.	Years in GL	Total	Years	Fate
Cerberus		Dogs	McAuliffe Oval, HMAS Cerberus	–	2003	2003	0	-	Moved to Southern FNL following 2003 season

== Football Premierships ==
The following is a list of all the Gippsland FL premiership winning teams from 1921 to 1953 and of the La Trobe FL from 1954 to present day.

The Reserves competition commenced in 1954, the Thirds competition in 1957 and the Fourths in 2000.

Year	Seniors	Reserves	Under 18's	Under 16's
	Gippsland FL		-	
1921	Maffra*		-	
1922	Rosedale		-	
1923	Traralgon		-	
1924	Sale		-	
1925	Traralgon		-	
1926	Maffra		-	
1927	Sale		-	
1928	Bairnsdale		-	
1929	Bairnsdale		-	
1930	Bairnsdale		-	
1931	Sale		-	
1932	Yallourn		-	
1933	Yallourn		-	
1934	Sale		-	
1935	Maffra		-	
1936	Yarram		-	
1937	Sale		-	
1938	Maffra		-	
1939	Yarram		-	
1940	GFL in recess. WWII			
1941	GFL in recess. WWII		-	
1942	GFL in recess. WWII		-	
1943	GFL in recess. WWII		-	
1944	GFL in recess. WWII		-	
1945	GFL in recess. WWII		-	
1946	Maffra Blacks		-	
1947	Bairnsdale		-	
1948	Maffra		-	
1949	Sale		-	
1950	Sale		-	
1951	Bairnsdale		-	
1952	Bairnsdale		-	
1953	Sale		-	
	La Trobe Valley FL		-	
1954	Sale	Traralgon	-	
1955	Sale	Warragul	-	
1956	Moe	Sale	-	
1957	Sale	Sale	Traralgon &	
			Sale (Co-Premiers)	
1958	Trafalgar	Sale	Morwell	
1959	Sale	Moe	Moe	
1960	Traralgon	Morwell	St Pat's	
1961	Morwell	Morwell	St Pat's A	
1962	Trafalgar	Traralgon	St Pat's A	
1963	Traralgon	Traralgon	St Pat's A	
1964	Traralgon	Traralgon	St Pat's A	
1965	Traralgon	Traralgon	St Pat's A	
1966	Morwell	Bairnsdale	Sale	
1967	Moe	Moe	St Pat's A	
1968	Traralgon	Moe	Sale	
1969	Traralgon	Sale	St Pat's A	
1970	Leongatha	Sale	St Pat's A	
1971	Sale	Sale	St Pat's A	
1972	Traralgon	Sale	St Pat's A	
1973	Sale	Morwell	Traralgon	
1974	Warragul	Warragul	St Pat's A	
1975	Sale	Traralgon	St Pat's A	
1976	Warragul	Traralgon	Sale	
1977	Leongatha	Traralgon	Sale	
1978	Traralgon	Traralgon	Leongatha	
1979	Leongatha	Leongatha	Warragul	
1980	Traralgon	Traralgon	Traralgon	
1981	Bairnsdale	Traralgon	Warragul	
1982	Leongatha	Traralgon	Warragul	
1983	Morwell	Bairnsdale	Maffra	
1984	Warragul	Warragul	Sale	
1985	Morwell	Traralgon	Warragul	
1986	Sale	Traralgon	Bairnsdale	
1987	Traralgon	Traralgon	Bairnsdale	
1988	Morwell	Traralgon	Traralgon	
1989	Leongatha	Traralgon	Traralgon	
1990	Traralgon	Maffra	Sale	
1991	Traralgon	Maffra	Moe	
1992	Traralgon	Traralgon	Traralgon	
1993	Morwell	Traralgon	Sale	
1994	Traralgon	Morwell	Sale	
1995	Leongatha	Traralgon	Bairnsdale	
1996	Morwell	Warragul	Traralgon	
1997	Leongatha	Leongatha	Sale	
1998	Traralgon	Sale	Sale	
1999	Traralgon	Traralgon	Sale	
2000	Traralgon	Leongatha	Traralgon	Leongatha
2001	Leongatha	Maffra	Sale	Traralgon
2002	Maffra	Maffra	Leongatha	Traralgon
2003	Maffra	Maffra	Traralgon	Sale
2004	Maffra	Maffra	Maffra	Sale
2005	Traralgon	Traralgon	Sale	Sale
2006	Maffra	Sale	Traralgon	Warragul
2007	Maffra	Traralgon	Traralgon	Maffra
2008	Sale	Traralgon	Traralgon	Traralgon
2009	Maffra	Moe	Maffra	Traralgon
2010	Maffra	Traralgon	Leongatha	Traralgon
2011	Traralgon	Maffra	Traralgon	Sale
2012	Sale	Leongatha	Bairnsdale	Traralgon
2013	Morwell	Wonthaggi	Bairnsdale	Sale
2014	Morwell	Traralgon	Traralgon	Moe
2015	Traralgon	Maffra	Traralgon	Traralgon
2016	Maffra	Traralgon	Bairnsdale	Moe
2017	Leongatha	Morwell	Traralgon	Moe
2018	Leongatha	Leongatha	Traralgon	Bairnsdale
2019	Maffra	Maffra	Leongatha	Traralgon
2022	Leongatha	Leongatha	Warragul	Maffra
2023	Leongatha	Leongatha	Maffra	Maffra
2024	Traralgon	Leongatha	Warragul	Traralgon
2025	Leongatha	Leongatha	Maffra	Maffra
2026	Moe	Traralgon	Traralgon	Traralgon

== Players ==
=== VFL/AFL Players ===
A number of players from the Gippsland league have gone on to play and have success at the AFL level.

Player	Original Gippsland Football League club	VFL/AFL club(s)	VFL/AFL games played	First season	Most recent season
Luke Ablett	Drouin	Sydney Swans	133	2002	2009
Ben Ainsworth	Morwell	Gold Coast Suns	56*	2017	2020
Craig Biddiscombe	Traralgon	Geelong / Richmond	78	1995	2003
Shane Birss	Sale	Western Bulldogs / St Kilda	71	2002	2008
John Butcher	Maffra	Port Adelaide	31	2010	2016
Jordan Cunico	Traralgon	Geelong	15	2015	2019
Josh Dunkley	Sale	Western Bulldogs	75*	2016	2020
Kyle Dunkley	Sale	Melbourne	5*	2019	2020
Jeff Gieschen	Maffra	Footscray	24	1974	1978
Brendon Goddard	Traralgon	St Kilda / Essendon	334	2003	2018
Jason Gram	Traralgon	Brisbane Lions / St Kilda	156	2002	2012
Will Hams	Sale	Essendon	13	2013	2016
Dyson Heppell	Leongatha	Essendon	172*	2011	2020
Changkuoth Jiath	Morwell	Hawthorn	7*	2018	2020
Declan Keilty	Moe	Melbourne	2	2018	2019
Jack Leslie	Sale	Gold Coast Suns	28	2014	2019
Jarryd Roughead	Leongatha	Hawthorn	283	2005	2019
Anthony McDonald-Tipungwuti	Drouin	Essendon	105*	2016	2020
Ben McKay	Warragul	North Melbourne	14*	2016	2020
Harry McKay	Warragul	Carlton	46*	2016	2020
Dylan McLaren	Sale	Brisbane Lions / Carlton	59	2001	2006
Robert McMahon	Moe	Fitzroy	2	1996	1996
Andrew McQualter	Traralgon	St Kilda / Gold Coast Suns	94	2005	2012
Tim Membrey	Traralgon	Sydney Swans / St Kilda	106*	2013	2020
Irving Mosquito	Maffra	Essendon	4*	2020	2020
Robert Murphy	Warragul	Western Bulldogs	312	2000	2017
Ryan Murphy	Traralgon	Fremantle	48	2004	2010
Jay Neagle	Traralgon	Essendon	28	2007	2010
Scott Pendlebury	Sale	Collingwood	313*	2006	2020
Ben Robbins	Maffra	Brisbane Bears / Brisbane Lions / North Melbourne	92	1996	2003
Michael Ross	Warragul	Essendon	2	2011	2011
Jacob Schuback	Sale	Adelaide	7	2003	2004
Caleb Serong	Warragul	Fremantle	12*	2020	2020
Sam Skinner	Moe	Brisbane Lions	3*	2016	2020
Dale Thomas	Drouin	Collingwood / Carlton	258	2006	2019
Matthew Watson	Warragul	Essendon	1	1939	1940
Leo "Gus" Young	Maffra	Hawthorn	10	1939	1940
Current AFL listed player *Games played correct as at 17 September 2020 † List may not be complete

== Premiers and Best & Fairest Winners ==
Year	Senior Premier	Senior B&F Winner	Season Summary (Ladder & Finals)
2026	Moe	Myles Poholke (Moe)	2026 season
2025	Leongatha	Benjamin Harding (Leongatha)	2025 season
2024	Traralgon	Riley Baldi (Moe)	2024 season
2023	Leongatha	Shannen Lange (Sale)	2023 Season
2022	Leongatha	Tom Marriott (Leongatha)	2022 Season
2019	Maffra	Jack Lipman (Sale)	2019 Season
2018	Leongatha	Tom Marriott (Leongatha)	2018 Season
2017	Leongatha	James Blaser (Moe), Kane Martin (Sale) & Jack Blair (Wonthaggi Power)	2017 Season
2016	Maffra	Brad Scalzo (Warragul)	2016 Season
2015	Traralgon	Bob McCallum (Drouin)	2015 Season
2014	Morwell	Adam Bailey (Morwell)	2014 Season
2013	Morwell	Kelvin Porter (Maffra)	2013 Season
2012	Sale	Luke Collins (Sale)	2012 Season
2011	Traralgon	Andrew Soumilas (Drouin)	2011 Season
2010	Maffra	Gary Jones (Maffra)	2010 Season
2009	Maffra	Adrian Cox (Sale) & Michael Geary ( Traralgon)	2009 Season
2008	Sale	Nick Hider (Maffra)	2008 Season
2007	Maffra	Nick Hider (Maffra)	2007 Season
2006	Maffra	Desi Barr (Warragul)	2006 Season
2005	Traralgon	Andrew Soumilas (Garfield)	2005 Season

== Records and statistics ==
Finishing positions of current clubs since 1954

Club	Premierships	Runners Up	3rd	4th	5th
Traralgon	21	18	10	6	3
Leongatha	13	10	7	6	3
Sale	10	7	9	11	2
Maffra	9	5	7	6	2
Morwell	9	8	10	3	7
Warragul	3	3	5	14	3
Moe	3	8	10	7	3
Bairnsdale	1	2	3	2	1
Wonthaggi	0	5	2	3	1
Drouin	0	2	0	1	2

Recent finishing positions

Club	2026	2025	2024	2023	2022	2019	2018	2017	2016	2015	2014	2013	2012	2011
Bairnsdale	8th	8th	7th	7th	9th	8th	7th	9th	10th	8th	5th	6th	8th	8th
Drouin	9th	10th	9th	10th	10th	5th	8th	10th	4th	7th	10th	9th	7th	2nd
Leongatha	2nd	1st	1st	3rd	1st	2nd	1st	1st	2nd	2nd	7th	7th	3rd	8th
Maffra	6th	7th	10th	8th	6th	1st	2nd	2nd	1st	3rd	4th	3rd	2nd	3rd
Moe	1st	3rd	3rd	2nd	7th	3rd	5th	4th	8th	9th	8th	10th	10th	7th
Morwell	7th	4th	6th	6th	5th	9th	9th	5th	9th	6th	1st	1st	5th	9th
Sale	10th	9th	5th	5th	3rd	4th	4th	6th	6th	5th	3rd	2nd	1st	4th
Traralgon	5th	2nd	2nd	4th	4th	7th	3rd	3rd	3rd	1st	6th	5th	4th	1st
Warragul	4th	5th	8th	9th	8th	10th	6th	7th	5th	10th	9th	8th	9th	10th
Wonthaggi	3rd	6th	4th	1st	2nd	6th	10th	8th	7th	4th	2nd	4th	6th	6th

Significant records

Record	Detail
Highest score:	45.22 (292) Traralgon vs. Churchill
Lowest score:	0.2 (2) Stratford vs. Traralgon; Bairnsdale vs. Traralgon
Most goals in a match:	(19) Adrian Campbell (Leongatha vs. Moe)
Most goals in a season:	136 Shane Loveless (Sale)
Record quarter score	
1st quarter	13.4 (82) Maffra vs. Newborough; Warragul vs. Newborough; Maffra vs. Churchill
2nd quarter	14.3 (87) Leongatha vs. Heyfield
3rd quarter	15.5 (95) Traralgon vs. Newborough
4th quarter	16.7 (103) Leongatha vs. Moe

== 2023 Ladder ==
Gippsland	Wins	Losses	Draws	For	Against	%	Pts
Wonthaggi	16	2	0	1818	802	226.68%	64
Moe	16	2	0	1606	892	180.04%	64
Leongatha	15	3	0	1911	832	229.69%	60
Traralgon	11	7	0	1511	1285	117.59%	44
Sale	10	8	0	1338	1202	111.31%	40
Morwell	7	11	0	1154	1334	86.51%	28
Bairnsdale	5	12	1	1142	1731	65.87%	22
Maffra	4	13	1	997	1634	61.02%	18
Warragul	3	15	0	816	1935	42.17%	12
Drouin	2	16	0	1232	1878	65.6%	8

Finals

Qualifying Final at Wonthaggi
2	Moe	11.7 (73)
3	Leongatha	16.5 (101)
4	Traralgon	9.11 (65)
5	Sale	5.6 (36)

Second Semi-Final at Morwell
1	Wonthaggi	9.10 (64)
Leongatha	6.6 (42)
First Semi-Final at Maffra
Moe	12.7 (79)
Traralgon	8.8 (56)

Preliminary Final at Sale
Leongatha	10.13 (73)
Moe	5.10 (40)

Grand Final at Morwell
Wonthaggi	7.7 (49)
Leongatha	14.5 (89)
