= Michael Ross (footballer) =

Australian rules footballer

Personal information
- Full name: Michael Ross
- Born: 16 September 1991 (age 35)
- Original teams: Gippsland Power, Warragul
- Draft: 80th overall, 2010; Essendon
- Height: 185 cm (6 ft 1 in)
- Weight: 75 kg (165 lb)
- Position: Midfielder

Playing career^{1}
Years	Club	Games (Goals)
2011	Essendon	2 (1)
- ^{1} Playing statistics correct to the end of 2012.

Michael Ross (born 16 September 1991) is an Australian rules footballer who played for the Essendon Football Club in the Australian Football League (AFL).

== Junior career ==
Ross originally played for the Warragul and then the Gippsland Power in the TAC Cup. He played 40 matches for Gippsland Power and averaged 21.4 disposals per game from his 14 appearances in 2010, the third highest average at the club. He was used mainly in the backline, where his 4.1 rebound 50s per game were a club-high. He has exceptional speed over 20 metres and was described in the press as a 'classy' and 'dashing' defender who set up a lot of positive play. In the 2010 TAC Cup Grand Final against the Calder Cannons, Ross gathered 30 possessions and 14 handball receives off half back and was clearly the Power's best in a side in which future Essendon teammate, Dyson Heppell, gathered 20 possessions.

Ross was drafted by Essendon in the 2010 AFL draft, at pick number 80. Ross was flying back from a three-week trip to Africa as the draft took place. "When I got back to Melbourne I turned the phone back on and was hoping for a message from Mum, but there was nothing. I walked off the plane ... and the whole family was standing there dressed in Bombers gear and cheering. It was pretty exciting."

== AFL début ==
Ross made his debut against Collingwood at the Melbourne Cricket Ground in Round 19, 2011 securing 19 disposals (9 kicks and 10 handballs), 2 marks, 1 goal contribute and 1 goal assist. He was the substitute player, though he played most of the game after Prismall was carried off with a knee injury in the first 5 minutes.

He was delisted by Essendon following the 2012 season.

== Personal details ==
Ross comes from the town of Garfield in Gippsland and is the grandson of South Melbourne VFL player Max Papley. His brother, Ben Ross, played 14 games at North Melbourne and 4 games with Hawthorn. His cousin, Tom Papley, currently plays for the Sydney Swans. Michael is a keen supercoach player, finishing 14th overall in 2012.

== Statistics ==
Statistics are correct to end of 2012 season.

Season	Team	No.	Games	Totals							Averages (per game)						
Season	Team	No.	Games	G	B	K	H	D	M	T	G	B	K	H	D	M	T
2011	Essendon	38	2	0	0	10	10	20	3	1	0.0	0.0	5.0	5.0	10.0	1.5	0.5
2012	Essendon	38	0	0	0	0	0	0	0	0	0.0	0.0	0.0	0.0	0.0	0.0	0.0
Career			2	0	0	10	10	20	3	1	0.0	0.0	5.0	5.0	10.0	1.5	0.5

Legend
G	Goals	K	Kicks	D	Disposals	T	Tackles
B	Behinds	H	Handballs	M	Marks
