= Cora Lynn =

- Town
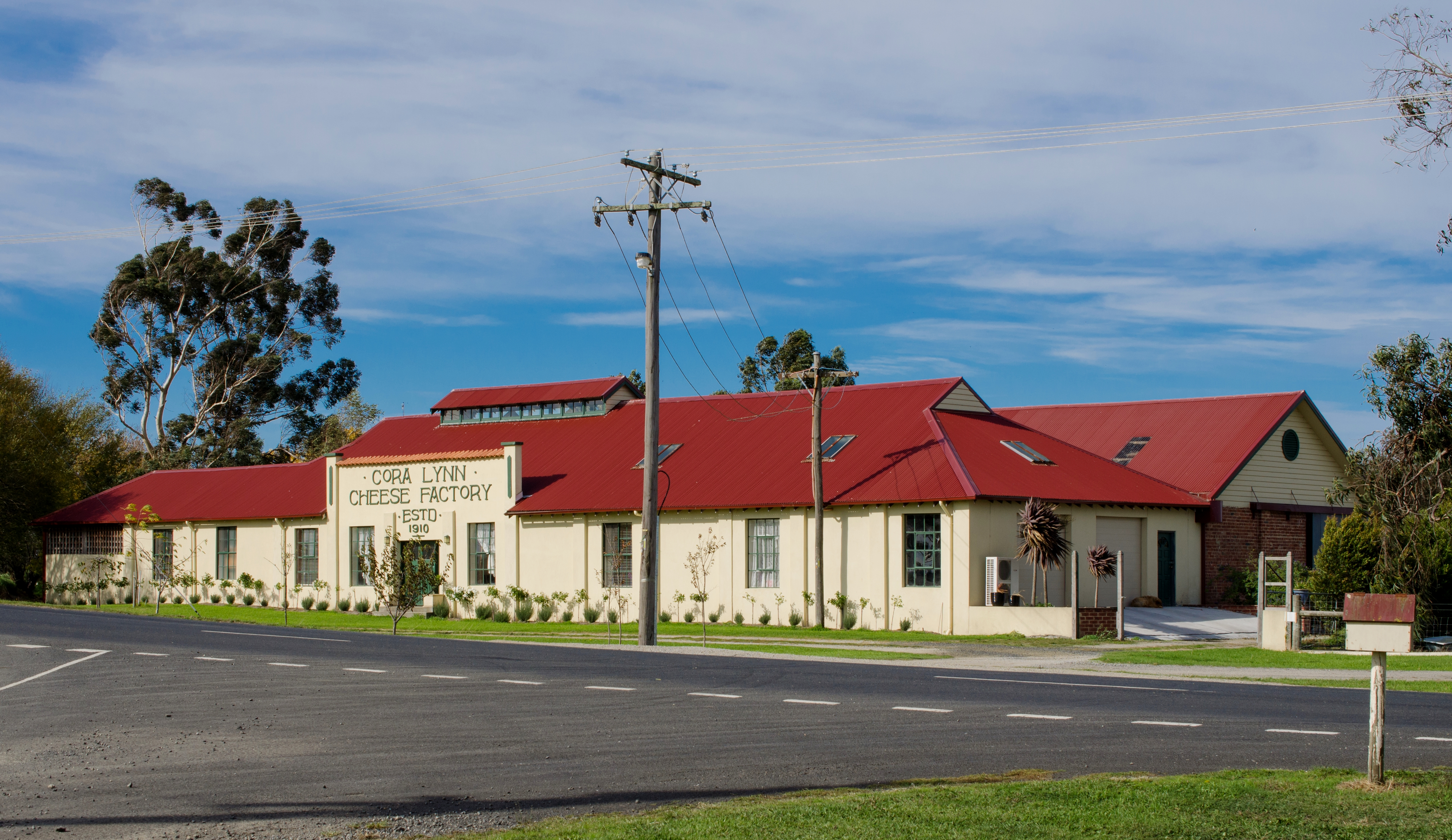
- Cora Lynn Cheese Factory

- Interactive map of Cora Lynn
- Coordinates: 38°08′43″S 145°36′21″E
- Country: Australia
- State: Victoria
- LGA: Shire of Cardinia
- Location: 68 km (42 mi) from Melbourne

Government
  - State electorate: Narracan
  - Federal division: Monash

Population
  - Total: 220 (2021 census)
- Postcode: 3814

Cora Lynn is a locality in Victoria, Australia, 68 km south-east of Melbourne's Central Business District, located within the Shire of Cardinia local government area. Cora Lynn recorded a population of 220 at the 2021 census.

== History ==
The origin of the town’s name is obscure. 'Cora Lynn' was a popular name for suburban villas in the late 19th century. Its origin was the subject of speculation in a small article in the Melbourne Herald in 1886. Here it was suggested that the name was a corruption of 'Coraline', derived from a misspelling by a recalcitrant signwriter. In 1950 the Townsville Daily Bulletin suggested that the name Cora Lynn ('often applied to guest houses') originated as the Gaelic word 'coire' meaning 'cauldron or kettle'. The Koo Wee Rup Swamp History Society's website claims the name was adapted from that of the Corra Linn Gorge, through which the North Esk River flows near Launceston, Tasmania.

Cora Lynn Post Office opened on 1 July 1907 and closed in 1999. The Cora Lynn State School opened in January 1907 and was originally called Koo-Wee-Rup West. The School closed and became part of Pakenham Consolidated School when it opened in May 1951. The now demolished Cora Lynn Hall (known as Keast Hall) was opened in 1911. Its official opening on June 13 was abandoned as the hall was flooded with three feet of water

== Today ==
Cora Lynn has an Australian Rules football club and a Netball club which currently competes in the West Gippsland Football Netball League. They previously competed in the Ellinbank and District Football Netball League.

== See also ==
- Shire of Pakenham – Cora Lynn was previously within this former local government area.
