= List of Australian rules football competitions in Victoria =

This is a list of active Australian rules football leagues in Victoria and its active clubs as of 2015.

== Victorian Football League ==
- Box Hill Hawks
- Carlton Reserves(formerly Northern Blues)
- Casey Demons
- Coburg
- Collingwood reserves
- Essendon reserves
- Footscray reserves
- Frankston
- Geelong reserves
- North Melbourne reserves
- Port Melbourne
- Preston Bullants(formerly Northern Blues)
- Richmond reserves
- Sandringham
- Werribee
- Williamstown

== Metropolitan Leagues ==
=== Victorian Amateur Football Association ===
- AJAX
- Albert Park
- Aquinas
- Beaumaris
- Box Hill North
- Bulleen Templestowe
- Canterbury
- Caulfield Grammarians
- Chadstone
- Collegians
- De La Salle
- Eley Park
- Elsternwick
- Fitzroy
- Glen Eira
- Hampton Rovers
- Hawthorn
- Ivanhoe
- Kew
- La Trobe University
- Manningham
- Marcellin
- Masala
- Mazenod
- Melbourne HS
- Monash Blues
- Monash Gryphons
- North Brunswick
- North Old Boys/St Pats
- Northern Blues
- Oakleigh
- Old Brighton
- Old Camberwell
- Old Carey
- Old Geelong
- Old Haileyburians
- Old Ivanhoe
- Old Melburnians
- Old Mentonians
- Old Paradians
- Old Scotch
- Old Trinity
- Old Xaverians
- Ormond
- Parkdale Vultures
- Parkside
- PEGS
- Peninsula
- Powerhouse
- Prahran
- Richmond Central
- Rupertswood
- South Melbourne Districts
- South Mornington
- St Bedes Mentone
- St Bernards
- St Francis Xavier
- St Johns
- St Kevins
- St Leo's
- St Mary's/Salesian
- Swinburne University
- Therry
- University Blacks
- University Blues
- UHS/VUT
- West Brunswick
- Westbourne
- Williamstown CYMS
- Whitefriars
- Yarra Valley

=== Eastern Football League ===
- Balwyn
- Bayswater
- Beaconsfield
- Berwick
- Blackburn
- Boronia
- Chirnside Park
- Coldstream
- Croydon
- Croydon North
- Doncaster
- Doncaster East
- Donvale
- East Burwood
- East Ringwood
- Eastern Lions
- Fair Park
- Ferntree Gully
- Forest Hill
- Glen Waverley Hawks
- Heathmont
- Kilsyth
- Knox
- Lilydale
- Mitcham
- Montrose
- Mooroolbark
- Mulgrave
- Noble Park
- North Ringwood
- Norwood
- Nunawading
- Oakleigh Districts
- Park Orchards
- Ringwood
- Rowville
- Scoresby
- Silvan
- South Belgrave
- South Croydon
- Surrey Park
- Templestowe
- The Basin
- Upper Ferntree Gully
- Vermont
- Wantirna South
- Warrandyte
- Waverley Blues
- Whitehorse Pioneers

Junior Clubs

- Glen Waverley Rovers
- Lysterfield FC
- St Simons FC

=== Essendon District Football League ===
- Aberfeldie
- Airport West
- Avondale Heights
- Coburg Districts
- Craigieburn
- Doutta Stars
- East Keilor
- East Sunbury
- Glenroy
- Greenvale
- Hadfield
- Hillside Sharks
- Jacana
- Keilor
- Keilor Park
- Moonee Valley
- Maribyrnong Park
- Northern Saints
- Oak Park
- Pascoe Vale
- Roxburgh Park
- Strathmore
- Sunbury Kangaroos
- Taylors Lakes
- Tullamarine
- West Coburg
- Westmeadows

=== Northern Football League ===
- Banyule
- Bundoora
- Diamond Creek
- Eltham
- Eltham College
- Epping
- Fitzroy Stars
- Greensborough
- Heidelberg
- Heidelberg West
- Hurstbridge
- Lalor
- Lower Plenty
- Macleod
- Mernda
- Montmorency
- North Heidelberg
- Northcote Park
- Panton Hill
- Reservoir
- St Marys
- South Morang
- Thomastown
- Watsonia
- West Preston Lakeside
- Whittlesea

Junior Clubs

- Alphington
- Keon Park
- Lalor Stars
- Mill Park
- Preston RSL
- Research
- West Lalor
- Yarrambat

=== Southern Football League ===
- Ashwood
- Bentleigh
- Black Rock
- Caulfield
- Cerberus
- Chelsea Heights
- Cheltenham
- Clayton
- Dandenong
- Dingley
- Doveton Eagles
- East Brighton
- East Malvern
- Endeavour Hills
- Hallam
- Hampton
- Hampton Park
- Heatherton
- Highett
- Keysborough
- Lyndale
- Lyndhurst
- Moorabbin
- Mordialloc
- Mount Waverley
- Murrumbeena
- Oakleigh District
- Port Colts
- Sandown Cobras
- Skye
- South Yarra
- Springvale District
- St Kilda City
- St Pauls – East Bentleigh

=== Western Region Football League ===
- Albanvale
- Albion
- Altona
- Braybrook
- Caroline Springs
- Deer Park
- Flemington Juniors
- Glenorden
- Hoppers Crossing
- Laverton
- Manor Lakes
- Newport
- North Sunshine
- North Footscray
- Parkside
- Point Cook
- Point Cook Centrals
- Spotswood
- Sunshine
- Sunshine Heights
- Tarneit
- Werribee Districts
- West Footscray
- Western Rams
- Wyndham Suns
- Wyndhamvale
- Yarraville Seddon

== Major Country Leagues ==
=== Ballarat Football League ===
- Bacchus Marsh
- Ballarat
- Darley
- East Point
- Lake Wendouree
- Melton
- Melton South
- North City
- Redan
- Sebastopol
- Sunbury

=== Bellarine Football League ===
- Anglesea
- Barwon Heads
- Drysdale
- Geelong Amateurs
- Modewarre
- Newcomb
- Ocean Grove
- Portarlington
- Queenscliff
- Torquay

=== Bendigo Football League ===
- Castlemaine
- Eaglehawk
- Gisborne
- Golden Square
- Kangaroo Flat
- Kyneton *
- Maryborough *
- Sandhurst
- South Bendigo
- Strathfieldsaye
- Broadford *

=== Central Murray Football League ===
- Balranald
- Cohuna
- Kerang
- Koondrook-Barham
- Lake Boga
- Mallee Eagles
- Nyah-Nyah West
- Swan Hill
- Tooleybuc-Manangatang
- Tyntynder
- Woorinen

=== Geelong Football League ===
- Bell Park
- Colac
- Geelong West Giants
- Grovedale
- Lara
- Leopold
- Newtown
- North Shore
- St Albans
- St Mary's
- St Josephs
- South Barwon

=== Gippsland Football League ===
- Bairnsdale
- Drouin
- Leongatha
- Maffra
- Moe
- Morwell
- Sale
- Traralgon
- Warragul
- Wonthaggi Power

=== Goulburn Valley Football League ===
- Benalla
- Echuca
- Euroa
- Kyabram
- Mansfield
- Mooroopna
- Rochester
- Seymour
- Shepparton
- Shepparton Swans
- Shepparton United
- Tatura

=== Hampden Football League ===
- Camperdown
- Cobden
- Hamilton
- Koroit
- North Warrnambool
- Port Fairy
- Portland
- South Warrnambool
- Terang Mortlake
- Warrnambool

=== Mornington Peninsula Nepean Football League ===
- Bonbeach
- Chelsea
- Crib Point
- Devon Meadows
- Dromana
- Edithvale Aspendale
- Frankston Bombers
- Frankston YCW
- Hastings
- Karingal
- Langwarrin
- Mornington
- Mount Eliza
- Pearcedale
- Pines
- Red Hill
- Rosebud
- Rye
- Seaford
- Somerville
- Sorrento
- Tyabb

=== Murray Football League ===
- Barooga
- Cobram
- Congupna
- Deniliquin Rams
- Echuca United
- Finley
- Moama
- Mulwala
- Nathalia
- Numurkah
- Rumbalara
- Tongala

=== North Central Football League ===
- Birchip-Watchem
- Boort
- Charlton
- Donald
- Nullawil
- Saint Arnaud
- Sea Lake Nandaly
- Wedderburn
- Wycheproof-Narraport

=== Outer East Football League ===
- Alexandra
- Beaconsfield
- Belgrave
- Berwick
- Cranbourne
- Doveton
- Emerald
- Gembrook-Cockatoo
- Healesville
- Kinglake
- Monbulk
- Mount Evelyn
- Narre Warren
- Olinda-Ferny Creek
- Officer
- Pakenham
- Powelltown
- Seville
- Thornton-Eildon
- Upwey-Tecoma
- Wandin
- Warburton-Millgrove
- Woori Yallock
- Yarra Glen
- Yarra Junction
- Yea

=== Ovens and Murray Football League ===
- Albury
- Corowa Rutherglen
- Lavington
- Myrtleford
- North Albury
- Wangaratta
- Wangaratta Rovers
- Wodonga
- Wodonga Raiders
- Yarrawonga

=== Sunraysia Football League ===
- Imperials
- Irymple
- Merbein
- Mildura
- Ouyen United
- Red Cliffs
- Robinvale
- South Mildura
- Wentworth Districts

=== Wimmera Football League ===
- Ararat
- Dimboola
- Horsham
- Horsham Saints
- Minyip-Murtoa
- Nhill
- Stawell
- Warracknabeal

== District Country Leagues ==
Central Highlands Football League

- Ballan
- Beaufort
- Bungaree
- Buninyong
- Carngham-Linton
- Clunes
- Creswick
- Daylesford
- Dunnstown
- Gordon
- Hepburn
- Learmonth
- Newlyn
- Rokewood-Corindhap
- Skipton
- Springbank
- Waubra

Colac and District Football League

- Alvie
- Apollo Bay
- Birregurra
- Colac Imperials
- Irrewarra-Beeac
- Lorne
- Simpson
- South Colac
- Otway Districts
- Western Eagles

East Gippsland Football League

- Boisdale Briagolong
- Lakes Entrance
- Lindenow
- Lucknow
- Orbost Snowy Rovers
- Paynesville
- Stratford
- Wy Yung

Ellinbank and District Football League

- Buln Buln
- Catani
- Ellinbank
- Lang Lang
- Longwarry
- Neerim Neerim South
- Nilma Darnum
- Nyora
- Poowong
- Trafalgar
- Yarragon

Geelong and District Football League

- Anakie Roos
- Bannockburn Tigers
- Bell Post Hill Panthers
- Belmont Lions
- Corio Devils
- East Geelong Eagles
- Geelong West Giants
- Inverleigh Hawks
- North Geelong Magpies
- Thomson Tigers
- Winchelsea Blues
- Werribee Centrals

Heathcote and District Football League

- Colbinabbin
- Elmore
- Heathcote
- Huntly
- Leitchville-Gunbower
- Lockington Bamawm United
- Mount Pleasant
- North Bendigo
- White Hills

Horsham and District Football League

- Edenhope-Apsley
- Harrow-Balmoral
- Jeparit Rainbow
- Kalkee
- Laharum
- Natimuk United
- Noradjuha-Quantong
- Pimpinio
- Rupanyup
- Southern Mallee
- Stawell Swifts
- Taylors Lake

Kyabram and District Football League

- Ardmona
- Avenel
- Girgarre
- Lancaster
- Longwood
- Merrigum
- Murchison
- Nagambie
- Rushworth
- Stanhope
- Tallygaroopna
- Undera
- Violet Town

Loddon Valley Football League

- Bears Lagoon-Serpentine
- Bridgewater
- Calivil United
- Inglewood
- Marong & District
- Mitiamo
- Newbridge
- Pyramid Hill
- YCW

Maryborough Castlemaine District Football League

- Avoca
- Campbells Creek
- Carisbrook
- Dunolly
- Harcourt
- Lexton
- Maldon
- Maryborough Rovers
- Natte-Bealiba
- Navarre
- Newstead
- Royal Park
- Talbot
- Trentham

Mid Gippsland Football League

- Boolarra
- Fish Creek
- Foster
- Hill End
- Meenyian-Dumbalk United
- Mirboo North
- Morwell East
- Newborough
- Stony Creek
- Tarwin
- Thorpdale
- Toora
- Yinnar

Millewa Football League

- Bambill
- Cardross
- Gol Gol Hawks
- Meringur
- Nangiloc
- Werrimull

Mininera and District Football League

- Ararat Eagles
- Caramut
- Glenthompson-Dunkeld
- Great Western
- Hawkesdale-Macarthur
- Lismore-Derrinallum
- Moyston-Willaura
- Penshurst
- SMW Rovers
- Tatyoon
- Wickliffe-Lake Bolac
- Woorndoo-Mortlake

North Gippsland Football League

- Churchill
- Cowwarr
- Glengarry
- Gormandale
- Heyfield
- Rosedale
- Sale City
- Traralgon Tyers United
- Woodside
- Yarram

Omeo and District Football League

- Bruthen
- Buchan
- Lindenow South
- Omeo-Benambra
- Swan Reach
- Swifts Creek

Ovens and King Football League

- Benalla All Blacks
- Bonnie Doon
- Bright
- Glenrowan
- Goorambat
- Greta
- King Valley
- Milawa
- Moyhu
- North Wangaratta
- Tarrawingee
- Whorouly

Picola and District Football League

- Berrigan
- Blighty
- Deniliquin Rovers
- Dookie United
- Jerilderie
- Katamatite
- Katandra
- Katunga
- Mathoura
- Picola
- Rennie
- Shepparton East
- Strathmerton
- Tocumwal
- Tungamah
- Waaia
- Yarroweyah

Riddell District Football League

- Diggers Rest
- Lancefield
- Macedon
- Melton Central
- Riddell
- Romsey
- Wallan
- Woodend-Hesket

South West District Football League

- Branxholme-Wallacedale
- Cavendish
- Coleraine
- Dartmoor
- Heathmere
- Heywood
- Tyrendarra
- Westerns

Tallangatta and District Football League

- Barnawartha
- Beechworth
- Chiltern
- Dederang-Mt. Beauty
- Kiewa-Sandy Creek
- Mitta United
- Rutherglen
- Tallangatta
- Thurgoona
- Wahgunyah
- Wodonga Saints
- Yackandandah

Upper Murray Football League

- Border-Walwa
- Bullioh
- Corryong
- Cudgewa
- Federal
- Tumbarumba

Warrnambool and District Football League

- Allansford
- Dennington
- East Warrnambool
- Kolora Noorat
- Merrivale
- Nirranda
- Old Collegians
- Panmure
- Russell's Creek
- South Rovers
- Timboon

West Gippsland Football League

- Bunyip
- Cora Lynn Cobras
- Dalyston
- Garfield
- Inverloch-Kongwak
- Kilcunda-Bass
- Koo Wee Rup
- Korumburra-Bena
- Nar Nar Goon
- Phillip Island
- Tooradin – Dalmore
- Warragul Industrials

Western Border Football League

- Casterton-Sandford
- East Gambier
- Millicent
- North Gambier
- South Gambier
- West Gambier

== Junior Football Leagues ==
- AFL Barwon Junior Football League
- Albury Wodonga Junior Football League
- Ballarat Junior Football League
- Bendigo Junior Football League
- Central Gippsland Junior Football League
- Football Netball East Gippsland
- Frankston and Districts Junior Football League
- Mornington Peninsula Junior Football League
- Riddell District Junior Football League
- Hampden Junior Football League
- Sale & District Junior Football League
- Saturday Football League
- Seymour & District Junior Football League
- Shepparton Junior Football Football League
- South East Metro Junior Football League
- South East Junior Football League
- Southern Gippsland Junior Football Competition
- Traralgon & District Junior Football League
- Wangaratta & District Junior Football League
- Warragul & District Junior Football League
- West Gippsland Junior Football Competition
- Greater South West Junior Football League
- Yarra Junior Football League
