= Caulfield Oakleigh District Football League =

Australian rules football competition

Caulfield-Oakleigh District Football League
- Most recent season or competition: 1962
- Sport: Australian rules football
- Founded: 1932
- First season: 1932
- Folded: 1962
- No. of teams: 20 (1962), 60 (historical)
- Country: Australia
- Last champion: Noble Park-Harrisfield (1962)
- Most titles: McKinnon (7)
- Related competitions: Federal FL; Eastern Suburban FL; Southern FNL

The Caulfield-Oakleigh District Football League (CODFL) was an Australian rules football competition based in Melbourne's southern suburbs that ran for 30 years between 1932 and 1962. Originally established as a junior competition, open-age grades were introduced for the 1936 season.

== History ==
The Caulfield-Oakleigh District Football League has roots stretching back to the late 1910s in the form of the Oakleigh District Junior Football Association. This competition was later renamed the Caulfield-Oakleigh-Dandenong Junior Football Association, but lapsed during the late 1920s. The Caulfield Oakleigh Junior Football Association began in 1932 and was renamed to Caulfield-Oakleigh District Football League in 1935. The early years of the competition were heavily supported by the Oakleigh Football Club, which was keen to establish a strong feeder competition in its area. The competition began with six clubs and the first premiership was won by the Caulfield Juniors.

The CODFL introduced its first open-age competition in 1936, with a second coming two years later in 1938. Despite playing through the beginning of the second World War, the senior competition was forced into recess in 1942 as enlistments took many players away, although junior competition would continue throughout the war. The senior competition returned in 1946.

The CODFL had become a fairly stable competition in the years following the war, however it faced increasing competition from the higher-standard Federal Football League for its best clubs by the 1950s. McKinnon won 4 premierships in a row between 1949 and 1952 before departing for the Federal FL at the end of the 1953 season, when the Victorian Football Union upheld McKinnon's appeal against the CODFL's refusal to grant them clearance. In response to this, the CODFL broke away from the VFU, with secretary W. J. Wilde claiming that the VFU had "lost its usefulness".

After Springvale and Bentleigh, two of the league's strongest clubs, both departed for the Federal FL after the 1957 season, a four-tier system was introduced in a bid to prevent any other clubs from leaving the CODFL. This system featured two senior grades (A and B) and two junior grades (U17 and U15) would run. A year later, a third open age grade, Reserve Open, was introduced underneath A grade, which did not require its clubs to field a reserve side. These changes failed to prevent clubs leaving, however. Glen Huntly and East Malvern entered the Federal FL in 1960 and 1961 respectively, while Glen Waverley received an invitation to join the Victorian Football Association in early 1961, which they duly accepted. The Eastern Suburban Football League, which had also been beset by club losses to the Federal League, entered into merger discussions with the CODFL in 1961, culminating in the formation of the South East Suburban Football League after the 1962 by way of a merger of the two leagues.

== Clubs ==
=== Final ===
==== A Grade ====
Club	Jumper	Nickname	Home Ground	Former League	Est.	Years in CODFL	CODFL Open Age Premierships		Fate
Club	Jumper	Nickname	Home Ground	Former League	Est.	Years in CODFL	Total	Most recent	Fate
Ashburton		Dragons	Ashburton Reserve, Ashburton	ESFL	1940s	1961-1962	0	-	Formed South East Suburban FL after 1962 season
Clayton YCW		Saints	Dixon Street Reserve, Clayton	–	1956	1956-1962	1	1959	Moved to YCWFA after 1962 season
Chadstone			Percy Treyvaud Memorial Park, Malvern East	–	1959	1959-1962	0	-	Formed South East Suburban FL after 1962 season
Dingley		Dingoes	Souter Oval, Dingley Village	–	1958	1959-1962	0	-	Formed South East Suburban FL after 1962 season
East Brighton		Vampires	Hurlingham Park, Brighton East	–	1948	1948-1962	1	1962	Formed South East Suburban FL after 1962 season
Glen Iris District			T.H. King Oval, Glen Iris	–	1959	1959-1962	0	-	Formed South East Suburban FL after 1962 season
Mount Waverley		Mounts, Blues	Mt Waverley Reserve, Mount Waverley	VFDFL	1924	1938-1962	0	-	Formed South East Suburban FL after 1962 season
Murrumbeena		Lions	Murrumbeena Park, Murrumbeena	VSDFL	1918	1934-1962	0	-	Merged with Murrumbeena Amateurs and formed South East Suburban FL after 1962 season
Noble Park-Harrisfield (Noble Park 1955-58)	(1955–58)(1959–60)(1961–62)	Bulls	Pat Wright Senior Oval, Noble Park	ESFL	1918	1933-34, 1938, 1955–1962	3	1962	Merged with Harrisfield after 1958 season. Formed South East Suburban FL after 1962 season
Oakleigh District		Districts	Police Paddocks, Oakleigh	–	1950	1950-1962	3	1958	Formed South East Suburban FL after 1962 season

*won in a lower grade

==== Reserve Open ====
Club	Jumper	Nickname	Home Ground	Former League	Est.	Years in CODFL	CODFL Open Age Premierships		Fate
Club	Jumper	Nickname	Home Ground	Former League	Est.	Years in CODFL	Total	Most recent	Fate
Burnley			Burnley Oval, Burnley	ESFL	1920s	1962	0	-	Reserves team of ESFL club. Formed South East Suburban FL after 1962 season
Carnegie		Tigers	Koornang Park, Carnegie	VAFA	c.1920s	1938-1962	2	1948	Formed South East Suburban FL after 1962 season
Caulfield Amateurs (Caulfield District 1946-58)			Caulfield Park, Caulfield North	–	1946	1946-1962	1	1962	Formed South East Suburban FL after 1962 season
Glen Iris District			T.H. King Oval, Glen Iris	–	1959	1959-1962	0	-	Formed South East Suburban FL after 1962 season
Hawthorn Amateurs			Victoria Road Reserve, Hawthorn East	ESFL	1954	1962	0	-	Reserves team of ESFL club. Formed South East Suburban FL after 1962 season
Highett West Youth Club			Peterson Street Reserve, Highett	–	1950s	1962	0	-	Formed South East Suburban FL after 1962 season
R.A.A.F Cadets			Highfield Park, Camberwell	–	1961	1961-1962	0	-	Formed South East Suburban FL after 1962 season
South Murrumbeena			Packer Park, Carnegie	–	1958	1959-1962	0	-	Formed South East Suburban FL after 1962 season

==== B Grade ====
Club	Jumper	Nickname	Home Ground	Former League	Est.	Years in comp	SFNL/SESFL Senior Premierships		Fate
Club	Jumper	Nickname	Home Ground	Former League	Est.	Years in comp	Total	Most recent	Fate
Ashburton		Dragons	Ashburton Reserve, Ashburton	ESFL	1940s	1961-1962	0	-	Formed South East Suburban FL after 1962 season
Carnegie		Tigers	Koornang Park, Carnegie	VAFA	c.1920s	1938-1962	2	1948	Formed South East Suburban FL after 1962 season
Dingley		Dingoes	Souter Oval, Dingley Village	–	1958	1959-1962	0	-	Formed South East Suburban FL after 1962 season
East Brighton		Vampires	Hurlingham Park, Brighton East	–	1948	1948-1962	1	1962*	Formed South East Suburban FL after 1962 season
Glen Iris District			T.H. King Oval, Glen Iris	–	1959	1959-1962	0	-	Formed South East Suburban FL after 1962 season
Highett West Youth Club			Peterson Street Reserve, Highett	–	1950s	1962	0	-	Formed South East Suburban FL after 1962 season
Mount Waverley		Mounts, Blues	Mt Waverley Reserve, Mount Waverley	VFDFL	1924	1938-1962	0	-	Formed South East Suburban FL after 1962 season
Murrumbeena		Lions	Murrumbeena Park, Murrumbeena	VSDFL	1918	1934-1962	0	-	Merged with Murrumbeena Amateurs and formed South East Suburban FL after 1962 season
Noble Park-Harrisfield (Noble Park 1955-58)	(1955–58)(1959–60)(1961–62)	Bulls	Pat Wright Senior Oval, Noble Park	ESFL	1918	1933-34, 1938, 1955–1962	3	1962	Merged with Harrisfield after 1958 season. Formed South East Suburban FL after 1962 season
Oakleigh District		Districts	Police Paddocks, Oakleigh	–	1950	1950-1962	3	1958	Formed South East Suburban FL after 1962 season
Sandown			Edinburgh Reserve, Springvale	–	1961	1962	0	-	Formed South East Suburban FL after 1962 season
South Murrumbeena			Packer Park, Carnegie	–	1958	1959-1962	0	-	Formed South East Suburban FL after 1962 season

=== C Grade only ===
Club	Jumper	Nickname	Home Ground	Former League	Est.	Years in comp	SFNL/SESFL Senior Premierships		Fate
Club	Jumper	Nickname	Home Ground	Former League	Est.	Years in comp	Total	Most recent	Fate
East Sandringham	(1948–50)(1951)(1952–62)	Zebras	RG Chisholm Reserve, Sandringham	–	1948	1948-1962	0	-	Formed South East Suburban FL after 1962 season
Mackie						1962	0	-	?

=== Former ===
Club	Jumper	Nickname	Home Ground	Former League	Est.	Years in comp	SFNL/SESFL Senior Premierships		Fate
Club	Jumper	Nickname	Home Ground	Former League	Est.	Years in comp	Total	Most recent	Fate
37th-52nd Battalion			Caulfield Park, Caulfield North	CODJFA		1932-1933	0	-	Folded after 1933 season
Bennettswood		Swans	Bennettswood Reserve, Burwood	–	1959	1959	0	-	Reserves team of ESFL club.
Bentleigh District		Demons	Bentleigh Reserve, Bentleigh	VAFA	1919	1938-1956	2	1947	Moved to Federal FL following 1956 season
Black Rock		Jets	Donald MacDonald Reserve, Beaumaris		1908	1941-1942	0	-	Fielded U18s team for two seasons
Carnegie Church of Christ						1939	0	-	Fielded U18s team for one season
Carnegie District				–		1941-1942	0	-	Folded after 1942 season
Carnegie Rovers				–		1937-1950s	0	-	?
Carnegie Sons of Soldiers				–		1939-1941	0	-	Folded after 1941 season
Caulfield City			Princes Park, Caulfield South	ESFL	1924	1946-1959	0	-	Merged with Camden and South Caulfield CYMS to form South Caulfield after 1957 season
Caulfield Juniors		Fieldsmen	Caulfield Park East, Caulfield North	CODJFA		1932-1939	0	-	Juniors only
Caulfield Park			Caulfield Park,Caulfield North			1937-1939	0	-	Juniors only
Cheltenham		Rosellas	Cheltenham Recreation Reserve, Cheltenham		1895	1941	0	-	Fielded U18 team for one season
Dandenong Juniors			Dandenong Showgrounds, Dandenong			1933-1934	0	-	Merged with Dandenong Amateurs to form Dandenong United after 1934 season
Dandenong United			Dandenong Showgrounds, Dandenong	–	1935	1935-1940, 1946–1950	1	1940	Merged with Dandenong (DDFA) to form a new Dandenong in the DDFA after 1950 season
Doveton		Doves	Robinson Reserve, Doveton	–	1959	1959-1961	0	-	Reserves side of South West Gippsland FL club. Joined seniors in SWGFL following 1961 season
East Malvern		Demons	Waverley Oval, Malvern East	ESFL	1934	1946-1961	3	1960	Moved to Federal FL following 1961 season
East Malvern United						1941-1945	0	-	Folded after 1945 season
East Malvern Congregational	Dark with light sash					1939-1940	0	-	Fielded U18 team for two seasons
East Oakleigh (Broadway Juniors 1932)	White with dark sash (1932)		Police Paddocks, Oakleigh	CODJFA		1932-1933, 1935-1937	0	-	Merged with South Oakleigh to form Oakleigh District (1) after 1937 season
Gardiner Methodists			Kooyong Reserve, Kooyong	CODJFA		1932	0	-	Moved to Eastern Suburban Protestant Churches FA after 1932 season
Glen Huntly		Hunters	Glen Huntly Park, Caulfield East	ESFL	1900s	1953-1959	1	1955	Moved to Federal FL following 1959 season
Glen Iris		Gladiators	Eric Raven Reserve, Glen Iris		1932	c.1940s-?	0	-	Juniors only, unsure of exact dates in CODFL
Glen Waverley			Central Reserve, Glen Waverley	VFDFL	1908	1938-1960	1	1954	Moved to VFA following 1960 season
Harrisfield			Parkfield Reserve, Noble Park	ESFL	1954	1959	0	-	Merged with Noble Park to form Noble Park-Harrisfield after 1959 season
Heatherton	White with light stripes	Tonners	Heatherton Recreation Reserve, Heatherton	BFA	1913	1938-1941	0	-	Moved to Federal FL following WWII
Hughesdale			Murrumbeena Park, Murrumbeena			1932-?	0	-	Juniors only, unsure of exact dates in CODFL
Huntingdale				VAFA		1959-1961	3	1961	?
Malvern Juniors			D.W. Lucas Oval, Malvern East	–	1932	1934-1940	0	-	B-grade side of VAFA club, did not return after WWII
McKinnon		Maccas	McKinnon Reserve, McKinnon	–	1936	1936-1941, 1946–1953	7	1952	Moved to Federal FL following 1953 season
Moorabbin City			Sir William Fry Reserve, Highett	–	1935	1935-1940	0	-	Merged with Moorabbin and Moorabbin Park to form Moorabbin after WWII.
North Caulfield						1959-1961	0	-	Moved to YCWFL as North Caulfield YCW in 1962
Oakleigh Colts						1941	0	-	Juniors only
Oakleigh Combined						1947	0	-	Folded after 1947 season
Oakleigh District (1)			Duncan McKinnon Reserve, Murrumbeena	–	1938	1938-1939, 1947	0	-	Folded after 1947 season
Ormond (Ormond United 1935-36)						1935-1940	0	-	Did not reform after WWII
Sandringham Juniors						1938-1940	0	-	Juniors only
South Oakleigh			Duncan McKinnon Reserve, Murrumbeena	CODJFA		1933-1937	0	-	Merged with South Oakleigh to form Oakleigh District (1) after 1937 season
Springvale		Demons	Springvale Reserve, Springvale	DDFA	1903	1933-1939, 1951–1956	1	1956	Moved to Federal FL following 1956 season
Tooronga			Johnson Oval, Tooronga Park, Malvern	ESFL		1955	0	-	Returned to Eastern Suburban FL after 1955 season
Wattle Park			McKinnon Reserve, McKinnon	CODJFA		1932-1933	0	-	Folded after 1933 season

== Premierships ==
Year	A (senior)	Reserve Open (senior)	B (senior)	C (U17)	D (U15)	E
1962	Noble Park-Harrisfield	Caulfield Amateurs	East Brighton	East Brighton	East Brighton	Oakleigh Juniors
1961	Noble Park-Harrisfield	Huntingdale	East Malvern	East Brighton	East Brighton	East Brighton
1960	East Malvern	Huntingdale	Noble Park-Harrisfield	East Brighton	Noble Park-Harrisfield	Mordialloc Youth Club
1959	East Malvern	Huntingdale	Clayton YCW	East Brighton	East Brighton	Harrisfield
1958	Oakleigh District	No comp (1958)	Glenhuntly	Oakleigh District	East Brighton	No comp (1958)
	A (senior)	B (U18)		C (U16)		
1957	Oakleigh District	Murrumbeena Rovers		East Sandringham and Oakleigh District		
1956	Springvale	Murrumbeena Rovers		Murrumbeena Rovers		
1955	Glenhuntly	East Sandringham		East Sandringham		
1954	Glen Waverley	Oakleigh District		East Sandringham		
1953	Oakleigh District	Oakleigh District		East Sandringham		
1952	McKinnon	Caulfield City		East Sandringham		
1951	McKinnon	Glenhuntly		McKinnon		
1950	McKinnon	Hughesdale		Bentleigh		
1949	McKinnon	Hughesdale				
1948	Carnegie	Hughesdale				
1947	Bentleigh	Oakleigh Juniors				
1946	East Malvern	Carnegie Rovers				
1945	Bentleigh	Oakleigh Juniors				
1944	No competition due to WWII	Oakleigh Juniors				
1943	No competition due to WWII	Oakleigh Juniors				
1942	No competition due to WWII	Oakleigh Juniors				
	A (senior)	B (U21)	B (U18)			
1941	Bentleigh	East Malvern	Murrumbeena Rovers			
1940	Dandenong United	Ormond Juniors	Carnegie Rovers			
1939	Carnegie	South Oakleigh	Carnegie Rovers			
		B (U21)				
1938	McKinnon	Heatherton				
1937	McKinnon	Caulfield Park				
1936	McKinnon	Oakleigh Juniors				
	A (U21)					
1935	Dandenong United					
1934	Murrumbeena					
1933	East Oakleigh					
1932	Caulfield Juniors					
