= Eastern Suburban Churches Football Association =

- Most recent season or competition: 1992
- Sport: Australian rules football
- Founded: 1923
- First season: 1923
- No. of teams: 35 (1992), at least 160 (historical)
- Most recent champion: Division 1: St Pauls Bentleigh Division 2: Richmond Amateurs Division 3: Heatherton (1992)
- Most titles: Burwood United, Trinity Presbyterian (12)

The Eastern Suburban Churches Football Association (ESCFA), formerly the Eastern Suburban Protestant Churches Football Association (ESPCFA), was an Australian rules football competition based in the eastern and southern suburbs of Melbourne.

For much of its history it consisted of clubs associated with various Protestant churches in Melbourne's east and south. At its peak it was one of the largest Australian rules football competitions in Australia, with 5 divisions of 10 clubs fielding seniors and reserves.

== History ==
The ESPCFA was formed on the March 19, 1923, when representatives of six churches in the Camberwell district met at the Camberwell Methodist School office to discuss the possibility of forming a local competition between the churches. The association expanded to a 12-team competition by 1928, which necessitated the formation of a B-grade competition the following year. C-grade was introduced in 1933. However, it disbanded before the 1936 season following the loss of a number of clubs and would not return until after World War II. D-grade was introduced in 1947.

The competition contracted back to three grades following the 1954 season after a number of clubs folded due to players moving to other local leagues. The 1950s were marked by the domination of Burwood United and Trinity Presbyterian, which won eight A-grade premierships between them from 1952 to 1959. The first reserve grade was introduced in 1959.

In 1971 Donvale United entered the competition, winning two A-grade premierships in their first three seasons in 1972 and 1973. St Marys Church of England achieved the league's first A-grade three-peat between 1978 and 1980. This would be bested by Donvale between 1988 and 1991 when they won four premierships in a row before departing for the Eastern Districts Football League.

As the population of the eastern suburbs aged, many clubs found it hard to field two sides, which led to a number of club mergers and disbandments during the 1970s. The requirement for clubs to be aligned with churches was dropped around the beginning of the 1980s, which allowed for the addition of district clubs to replace the dwindling numbers of church-aligned teams. The ESCFA absorbed a number of clubs from the defunct YCW National Football Association in 1986, which helped keep the number of clubs reasonably stable. However, the loss of eight clubs at the end of the 1989 season, many of them decades-long members of the league, saw E-grade dropped for 1990 and revealed that the competition's days were numbered. A number of prominent clubs left prior to the 1992 season, including the previous years' A-grade premiers Donvale and the oldest member club, St Marys Church of England, leading to the bottom two divisions being combined. The ESCFA merged with the Southern Football League following the 1992 season, with most clubs merging into the ranks of the new league.

== Clubs ==
=== Final ===
==== Division 1 ====
Club	Colours	Nickname	Home Ground	Former League	Est.	Years in ESCFA	ESCFA Senior Premierships		Fate
Club	Colours	Nickname	Home Ground	Former League	Est.	Years in ESCFA	Total	Most recent	Fate
Bentleigh Uniting (Bentleigh Methodist 1965-76)	(1965-86)(1987-95)	Kangaroos	Bentleigh Reserve, Bentleigh	–	1965	1965-1992	2	1990	Moved to Southern FL in 1993
Burwood United		Woods	Burwood Reserve, Glen Iris	–	1930	1930-1958, 1961-1992	12	1985	Moved to Southern FL in 1993
Canterbury North Balwyn			Macleay Park, Balwyn North	–	1977	1977-1992	1	1986	Moved to VAFA in 1993
Collingwood Districts			Ramsden Street Oval, Clifton Hill	–	1986	1987-1992	3	1991	Moved to Southern FL in 1993
Hampton United (Hampton Methodist 1947-75)	(1947-?)(?-1992)	Hammers	Peterson Street Reserve, Highett	–	1947	1947-1948, 1959-1992	5	1986	Played in Methodist FL between 1949-51. Recess between 1952-58. Moved to Southern FL in 1993
Oakleigh Amateur		Krushers	W.A. Scammell Reserve, Oakleigh	–	1992	1992	0	-	Moved to VAFA in 1993
St Kevins Ormond		Saints	Koornang Park, Carnegie	YCWFL	1946	1976-1992	0	-	Merged with Gardenvale to form Caulfield Bears in Southern FL following 1992 season
St Pauls Bentleigh		Bulldogs	McKinnon Reserve, Bentleigh	YCWFL	1948	1980-1992	2	1992	Moved to Southern FL in 1993
Springvale Districts (Springvale YCW 1981)		Demons	Springvale Reserve, Springvale	YCWFL	1959	1981-1992	4	1989	Moved to Southern FL in 1993
Wattle Park-Bennettswood (Wattle Park Presbyterian 1963-77; Wattle Park United 1978-90)			Bennettswood Reserve North Oval, Burwood	–	1963	1963-1992	4	1987	Absorbed by Doncaster East in Eastern Districts FL following 1992 season

==== Division 2 ====
Club	Colours	Nickname	Home Ground	Former League	Est.	Years in ESCFA	ESCFA Senior Premierships		Fate
Club	Colours	Nickname	Home Ground	Former League	Est.	Years in ESCFA	Total	Years	Fate
Balwyn Combined		Demons	Macleay Park, Balwyn North	–	1945	1945-1992	2	1985	Moved to VAFA in 1993
Box Hill Pioneers-St Peters (Box Hill Pioneers 1954-78)		Pioneers, Pies	Springfield Park Box Hill North	–	1954	1954-1992	6	1986	Moved to Southern FL in 1993
Cheltenham Assumption (Cheltenham Church of Christ 1967-73, Cheltenham United 1974-79)		Red Roosters	Le Page Park, Cheltenham	–		1967-1992	2	1976	Moved to Southern FL in 1993
Dandenong South			Andrews Reserve, Dandenong	YCWFL		1987-1992	1	1987	Folded after 1992 season
East Camberwell			Lynden Park, Camberwell	CYMSFA	1946	1973-1992	2	1990	Moved to Southern FL in 1993
Fairfield		Bloods	Fairfield Park Oval, Fairfield	VAFA	1891	1975-1992	0	-	Moved to Southern FL in 1993
Lower Plenty (Diamond Valley United 1971-77)	(1980s)(?-1992)	Hawks	Montmorency Park, Montmorency	MCFL, PHFL	1962	1971-1982, 1986-1992	3	1991	Played in Panton Hill FL between 1983-85. Moved to Southern FL in 1993
Richmond Amateurs (Richmond St Ignatius 1978)		Rosellas	Kevin Bartlett Reserve, Burnley	YCWFL		1978, 1987-1992	1	1992	Moved to Southern FL in 1993
South Yarra (South Yarra Presbyterian 1968-71; South Yarra Methodist 1972-77; South Yarra Uniting 1978-84)		Lions	Howard Dawson Reserve, Glen Iris	–	1967	1967-1992	2	1988	Moved to Southern FL in 1993
Syndal-Tally Ho		Synners, Demons	Jordan Reserve, Chadstone	–	1980	1980-1992	3	1987	Moved to Southern FL in 1993

==== Division 3 ====
Club	Colours	Nickname	Home Ground	Former League	Est.	Years in ESCFA	ESCFA Senior Premierships		Fate
Club	Colours	Nickname	Home Ground	Former League	Est.	Years in ESCFA	Total	Years	Fate
Ashburton-Chadstone		Toffee Apples	Watson Park, Ashburton	–	1986	1986-1992	0	-	Moved to Southern FL in 1993
Box Hill Adelphian			Elgar Park, Box Hill North	–	1936	1936-1992	3	1980	Moved to Southern FL in 1993
Box Hill North			Elgar Park, Box Hill North	–	1983	1983-1992	1	1991	Moved to Southern FL in 1993
Bellfield		Mud and Bloods	Ford Park, Bellfield	VAFA, PDJFL	1950s	1966-1977, 1979-1992	0	-	Played in Preston District Junior FL in 1978. Moved to Melbourne North FL in 1993
Black Rock		Jets	Donald MacDonald Reserve, Black Rock	YCWFL, SESFL	1908	1980-1985, 1992	2	1984	Moved to Southern FL in 1986 and 1993
Carnegie		Demons	East Caulfield Reserve, Caulfield East	SESFL	c.1920s	1991-1992	0	-	Returned to Southern FL in 1993
Dandenong West		Blues, Westerners	Greaves Reserve, Dandenong	SESFL	1963	1987-1992	0	-	Returned to Southern FL in 1993
East Bentleigh			Mackie Road Reserve, Bentleigh East	YCWFL		1979-1980, 1982-1992	1	1986	Recess in 1981. Moved to Southern FL in 1993
Eley Park		Sharks	Eley Park, Blackburn South	–	1992	1992	0	-	Moved to Southern FL in 1993
Gardenvale (Gardenvale East Presbyterian 1946-77)		Eagles	Princes Park, Caulfield South	–	1946	1946-1992	0	-	Merged with St Kevins Ormond to form Caulfield Bears in Southern FL following 1992 season
Heatherton		Tunners	Heatherton Recreation Reserve, Heatherton	VAFA	1913	1990-1992	1	1992	Moved to Southern FL in 1993
Lyndale		Pumas	Barry Powell Reserve, Noble Park North	SESFL	1961	1990-1992	0	-	Returned to Southern FL in 1993
Moorabbin West		Kangaroos	A.W Oliver Reserve, Hampton East	YCWFL	1978	1986-1992	0	-	Moved to Southern FL in 1993
Mount Waverley Catholics	(1979)(1990s)	Mountain Lions	Mayfield Park, Mount Waverley	YCWFL	1974	1975-1992	1	1978	Moved to Southern FL in 1993
North Blackburn (North Blackburn Methodist 1967-77, North Blackburn Uniting 1978-80)		Eagles	Koonung Park, Blackburn North	–	1967	1967-1992	2	1989	Moved to Southern FL in 1993

=== Former ===
Due to a lack of records on the league, particularly prior to 1970, only known participation years are listed. Additionally, many clubs merged and changed names frequently in the first few decades of competition so some separately-listed entities may actually be continuations of other clubs.

Club	Colours	Nickname	Home Ground	Former League	Est.	Known years in ESCFA	ESCFA Senior Premierships		Fate
Club	Colours	Nickname	Home Ground	Former League	Est.	Known years in ESCFA	Total	Years	Fate
Aquinas Old Boys		Bloods	Aquinas College, Ringwood	–	1981	1981-1985	2	1984	Moved to VAFA in 1986
Ashburton Uniting (Ashburton Methodist 1948-79)			Watson Park, Ashburton	–	1940s	1948-1985	1	1966	Merged with Chadstone Salesian to form Ashburton-Chadstone in 1986
Auburn Collegians		Hawks	St. James Park, Hawthorn	–	1931	1931-1932	0	-	Moved to Eastern Suburban FL as East Hawthorn in 1933
Auburn Presbyterian						1923-1927	0	-	?
Balwyn Baptist (Balwyn Church of Christ 1937-1956, 1962-67, North Balwyn Church of Christ 1968-70)			Balwyn Park South Oval, Balwyn			1928-1931, 1933-1934, 1936-1946, 1962-1972	4	1970	Folded after 1972 season
Balwyn United						1924, 1926, 1932-1941	2	1939	Did not return following WWII
Blackburn						1979	0	-	Folded after 1979 season
Blackburn Baptist			Eley Park, Blackburn South	–	1966	1968-1982	2	1977	Merged with Blackburn South juniors to form Blackburn South in 1983
Blackburn Church of Christ						1938	0	-	Folded
Blackburn North (Blackburn North Baptist 1965-83)		Burners	Koonung Park, Blackburn North	–	1965	1965-1989	1	1970	Folded after 1989 season
Blackburn South			Mirrabooka Reserve, Blackburn South	–	1983	1983	0	-	Moved to Eastern Districts FL in 1984
Blackburn United				–	1945	1945-1982	1	1948	Merged with St Andrews Box Hill to form Box Hill North after 1982 season
Box Hill Baptist				–	1923	1923-1929	0	-	Merged with Box Hill Methodist to form Box Hill United after 1929 season
Box Hill Church of Christ			Mont Albert Reserve, Mont Albert North	–	1967	1967-1983	0	-	Folded after 1983 season
Box Hill Combined						1931-1933	0	-	?
Box Hill District						1933-1935	0	-	?
Box Hill KSP						1925	0	-	?
Box Hill Methodist		Hills	Whitehorse Reserve, Box Hill	–	1924	1924-1928, 1934-1936, 1957-1976	4	1975	Replaced by Whitehorse United after 1976 season
Box Hill United			Middleborough Park, Box Hill	–	1930	1930-1933	0	-	?
Brighton United		Bucs	William Street Reserve, Brighton	–	1964	1964-1989	1	1978	Folded after 1989 season
Burke Road Methodist (Burke Road Balwyn 1932-33)						1932-1934	0	-	?
Burwood Combined						1936	0	-	?
Burwood Methodist						1940-1945	0	-	?
Burwood Presbyterian			Burwood Reserve, Glen Iris			1936-1938	1	1937	?
Burwood Protestant						1939-1940	1	1940	?
Bulleen United (Bulleen Presbyterian 1964-68; Bulleen Methodist/Presbyterian 1963)		Bulls	Koonung Park, Bulleen	–	1963	1963-1974	0	-	Moved to VAFA in 1975
Camberwell Baptist						1946-1975	3	1968	Folded after 1975 season
Camberwell Church of Christ						1941, 1958-1962	0	-	Folded after 1962 season
Camberwell Methodist			Highfield Park, Camberwell			1923-1929, 1933, 1935-1936, 1946-1951	1	1935	Folded after 1951 season
Canterbury Methodist						1923	0	-	?
Canterbury-St Silas (Canterbury Presbyterian 1932-75)		Berries		–	1932	1932-1934, 1945-1976	2	1974	Merged with North Balwyn Methodist to from Canterbury North Balwyn in 1977
Canterbury United				–	1927	1927-1930	2	1930	Moved to VAFA in 1931
Caulfield Church of Christ						1948-1960	2	1949	Folded after 1960 season
Caulfield Kontias		Magpies	Caulfield Park, Caulfield	–	1985	1985-1988	0	-	Moved to VAFA in 1989
Chadstone Salesian			Salesian College, Chadstone	–	1973	1973-1985	2	1974	Merged with Ashburton Uniting to form Ashburton-Chadstone in 1986
Church of Christ Combined						1945-1946	1	1945	Folded
Church of Christ Hawthorn						1931-1932, 1935, 1951	0	-	Folded after 1951 season
Clayton United (Clayton Methodist 1963-75)				–	1963	1963-1977	1	1967	Folded after 1977 season
Clayton Saints		Saints	Namatjira Park, Clayton South	YCWFL	1956	1985-1990	1	1990	Moved to VAFA in 1991 as St Peter's Clayton
Collingwood Methodist						1930	0	-	?
Dandenong Methodist						1961-1971	0	-	Folded after 1971 season
Darling Combined						1935-1938	0	-	?
Darling Methodist						1950-1953	0	-	Folded
Deepdene Presbyterian						1941	0	-	Folded
Deepdene United (Deepdene 1980-82)			Deepdene Park, Deepdene			1980-1983	0	-	Folded after 1983 season
Donvale United		Magpies	Donvale Reserve, Donvale	–	1971	1971-1991	7	1991	Moved to Eastern Districts FL in 1992
East Kew Church of Christ						1925	0	-	?
East Kew Combined				–	1964	1964-1977	1	1969	Merged with Koonung Heights Methodist to from Koonung-East Kew in 1978
East Malvern Presbyterian						1947-1961	3	1950	Folded after 1961 season
East Ringwood Baptist						1959	0	-	Folded after 1959 season
Eastern Salvation Army				MPCFA		1965-1970	0	-	Folded after 1970 season
Elsternwick United (Elsternwick Methodist 1929-31, 1938-51, Elsternwick United 1932, 1952-88; Middle Park-Elsternwick United 1989)			Princes Park No. 2 Oval, Caulfield South	–	1929	1929-1989	5	1966	Folded after 1989 season
Elwood			Wattie Watson Oval, Elwood	CYMSFA		1975-1983	1	1975	Folded after 1983 season
Emmanuel Church of England			W.A. Scammell Reserve, Oakleigh	–	1962	1962-1991	4	1981	Merged with Oakleigh Sacred Heart to form Oakleigh Amateur in 1992
Gardiner Church of Christ			Darling Park, Malvern East	–	1928	1928-1972	3	1970	Folded after 1972 season
Gardiner Methodist				CODFL		1933-1938	0	-	?
Gardiner Presbyterian						1947-1954	0	-	Folded
Glenferrie Church of Christ						1926-1927	0	-	?
Glenhuntly St Anthonys	(1973-?)(?-1989)	Hunters	Glenhuntly Reserve, Caulfield East	YCWFL		1973-1989	2	1982	Absorbed by Balaclava in VAFA in 1990
Glen Iris Presbyterian						1946-1953	0	-	Folded
Glen Iris United			Ashburton Park, Ashburton			1934-1954	2	1952	Folded
Glen Waverley			Brentwood Reserve, Glen Waverley			1977-1991	2	1982	Folded prior to 1992 season
Hartwell (Hartwell Presbyterian 1929-75)		Wellers	Hartwell Sports Ground, Glen Iris	ESFL	1920s	1929, 1931-1987	4	1987	Folded after 1987 season
Hartwell United (Hartwell Church of Christ 1926-27)						1926-1932	0	-	?
Hawthorn Methodist						1940-1947	2	1947	?
Hawthorn Presbyterian						1923-1927, 1929	2	1926	?
Hawthorn United						1972	0	-	Folded after 1972 season
Hawthorn YCW			Rathmines Road Reserve, Hawthorn East	YCWFL		1983-1989	1	1985	Folded after 1989 season
Heathmont United				–	1970	1970-1972	0	-	Folded after 1972 season
Highfield (Highfield Road Methodist 1930-76)	(?-1976)(1976-89)	Sharks	Highfield Park, Camberwell	–	1930	1930-1989	3	1970	Folded after 1989 season
Highfield Baptist						1937-1939	1	1938	?
Holy Trinity Kew						1931	0	-	?
Kew Baptist				–	1941	1941-1970	0	-	Folded after 1970 season
Kew Congregational						1959	0	-	Folded after 1959 season
Kew Presbyterian						1923-1930	1	1923	?
Kew United			Kew Mental Hospital Oval, Kew			1933-1936	2	1935	?
Kew-Hawthorn United						1962	0	-	Folded after 1962 season
Knox (Knox Baptist 1980-82)		Hawks	Knox Gardens Reserve, Wantirna South	–	1980	1980-1988	0	-	Moved to Eastern Districts FL in 1989
Koonung (Koonung Heights Methodist 1961-?, Koonung-East Kew 1978-81)	(1967)(1978)		Elgar Park South East Oval, Mont Albert North	–	1961	1961-1986	0	-	Folded after 1986 season
Malvern Combined						1948-1961	1	1956	?
Malvern Methodist						1926-1929	1	1927	?
Malvern Presbyterian						1946-1955	0	-	Folded
Malvern South Uniting (Glendearg Grove Methodist 1932-56, Malvern South Methodist 1957-77)			Righetti Oval, Kooyong			1931-1978	2	1976	Merged with South Caulfield to form South Caulfield-Malvern in 1979
Mazenod Old Collegians		Nodders	Mulgrave Reserve West Oval, Wheelers Hill	–	1978	1978-1988	4	1988	Moved to VAFA in 1989
Mont Albert Methodist (Mont Albert United 1933-35)			Mont Albert Reserve, Mont Albert North			1929-1931, 1934-1935, 1948-1974	0	-	Folded after 1974 season
Mount Erica						1947-1951	0	-	Folded
Murrumbeena-South Caulfield		Twisties	Princes Park, Caulfield South	–	1982	1982-1991	0	-	Merged with St Kilda CBC Old Boys to form St Kilda-South Caulfield in VAFA in 1992
Murrumbeena United						1931-1935, 1950-1954	0	-	?
Noble Park Bears (Noble Park Methodist 1964-77; Noble Park United 1978-79, Noble Park Uniting 1980-84)		Bears	Parkfield Reserve, Noble Park	–	1962	1964-1988	1	1972	Moved to Eastern Districts FL in 1989
North Balwyn Methodist			Macleay Park, Balwyn North	–	1964	1964-1976	4	1974	Merged with Canterbury St Silas to from Canterbury North Balwyn in 1977
Oakleigh Presbyterian (Oakleigh United 1932-34)			Chadstone Park, Oakleigh			1930-1936	0	-	?
Oakleigh Sacred Heart		Oaks, Devils	Jack Edwards Reserve, Oakleigh	–	1932	1973-1991	3	1984	Merged with Emmanuel to form Oakleigh Amateur in 1992
OLV-South Camberwell						1973-1979	1	1977	Folded after 1979 season
Ormond Church of Christ						1971-1972	1	1971	Folded after 1972 season
Ormond United						1931-1933	1	1932	?
Prahran-Malvern Church of Christ						1931	0	-	?
Preston United (Preston Methodist 1972-74)						1972-1975	1	1972	Folded after 1975 season
Rathmines United						1931-1935	1	1933	Folded after failed transfer to Eastern Suburban FL after 1935 season
Salvo Saints (Salvation Army 1986)		Saints		–	1986	1986-1989	0	-	Folded after 1989 season
Sandringham Sacred Heart				YCWFL		1981-1988	1	1984	Folded after 1988 season
South Camberwell United			Howard Dawson Reserve, Glen Iris	VAFA	1920s	1945-1954	1	1950	Folded after 1954 season
South Caulfield		Twisties	Princes Park, Caulfield South	YCWFL		1976-1978	1	1922	Merged with Malvern South Uniting to form South Caulfield-Malvern in 1979
South Caulfield-Malvern		Twisties	Princes Park, Caulfield South	–	1979	1979-1981	0	-	Merged with Murrumbeena District to form South Caulfield-Malvern in 1979
South Hawthorn Presbyterian (South Hawthorn United 1930-39)			Auburn Recreation Reserve			1928-1939, 1946-1954	4	1936	Merged with Hawthorn West Youth Club to form Hawthorn Amateurs in VAFA in 1955
South Ringwood (Ringwood United 1974-87)	(1974-?)(?-1989)	Bulldogs	Proclamation Park, Ringwood			1974-1989	0	-	Folded after 1989 season
South Yarra Church of Christ						1950-1952	0	-	Folded
Spring Road Methodist						1927-1929, 1932-1941	2	1941	Did not return following WWII
St Andrews Box Hill (St Andrews Presbyterian 1959-80)		Saints	Springfield Park West, Box Hill North	–	1959	1959-1982	2	1979	Merged with Blackburn United to form Box Hill North after 1982 season
St Columbs Church of England						1928-1930, 1932-1935, 1945-1952	3	1951	Folded
St Francis Box Hill						1970	0	-	Folded after 1970 season
St Georges Presbyterian						1950-1958	2	1955	Folded
St George's Reservoir (St George's Church of England 1973)			CH Sullivan Memorial Park, Reservoir			1973-1980	2	1977	Moved to Panton Hill FL in 1981
St Johns Methodist						1968-1970	0	-	Folded after 1970 season
St John's Old Boys						1953-1955	0	-	Folded
St Leos Wattle Park		Animals	Bennettswood Sports Ground, Burwood	–	1971	1973-1990	5	1987	Moved to VAFA in 1991
St Marys Church of England	(1932-39)(1945-50)(1951-90)	Saints	Ferndale Park, Glen Iris	–	1932	1932-1990	6	1980	Moved to VAFA in 1991
St Marys East Malvern			Darling Park, Malvern East			1973-1987	2	1980	Folded after 1987 season
St Marks Church of England						1950-1960	0	-	Folded
St Oswalds Church of England						1950-1954	1	1952	Folded
St Patricks Mentone		Vultures	Southern Road Reserve, Mentone	YCWFL	1969	1980-1990	2	1989	Moved to VAFA in 1991
St Peters Church of England			Springfield Park, Box Hill North	–	1930	1930-1978	2	1959	Merged with Box Hill Pioneers to form Box Hill Pioneers-St Peters in 1979
St Stephens Presbyterian						1927-1928, 1941-1969	2	1954	Folded after 1979 season
Surrey Hills Church of Christ			Surrey Park, Box Hill			1933-1946	2	1938	Folded
Surrey Hills Combined						1946-1952	1	1948	Folded
Surrey Hills CYMS						1925	0	-	?
Surrey Hills Methodist			Mont Albert Reserve, Mont Albert North			1929-1931, 1934	0	-	?
Surrey Hills (Surrey Hills Presbyterian 1952-75)						1952-1979	1	1960	Folded after 1979 season
Surrey Hills Protestant						1950	0	-	?
Surrey Hills United			Surrey Park, Box Hill			1930-1937	0	-	?
Syndal Baptist		Synners	Jordan Reserve, Chadstone	–	1966	1966-1979	5	1979	Merged with Tally Ho juniors to form Syndal-Tally Ho in 1980
Toorak Methodist				–	1935	1935	0	-	?
Trinity Presbyterian			Howard Dawson Reserve, Glen Iris			1949-1984	12	1981	Folded after 1984 season
West Hawthorn Presbyterian				–	1924	1924-1926	0	-	Moved to MAFA in 1927 as West Hawthorn
West Hawthorn United						1940-1958	1	1949	?
West Ivanhoe		Roosters	Seddon Reserve, Ivanhoe	YCWFL		1986-1991	0	-	Folded after 1991 season
Whitehorse United			Whitehorse Reserve, Box Hill	–	1977	1977-1979	0	-	Folded after 1979 season
Wonga Park		Kangaroos	Brushy Creek Park, Croydon North	–	1982	1982-1985	0	-	Moved to Eastern Districts FL in 1986

== Premiers ==
Year	Division 1	Division 2	Division 3			
1992	St Pauls Bentleigh	Richmond Amateurs	Heatherton	3 divisions (1992)		
	A	B	C	D	E	
1991	Donvale United	Collingwood Districts	Lower Plenty	Box Hill North	4 divisions (1990-1991)	
1990	Donvale United	Bentleigh Uniting	East Camberwell	Clayton Saints	4 divisions (1990-1991)	
1989	Donvale United	Springvale Districts	Collingwood Districts	St Patricks Mentone	North Blackburn	5 divisions (1975-1989)
1988	Donvale United	Mazenod Old Collegians	Springvale Districts	Collingwood Districts	South Yarra	5 divisions (1975-1989)
1987	St Leos Wattle Park	Syndal-Tally Ho	Wattle Park United	Dandenong South	Hartwell	5 divisions (1975-1989)
1986	Hampton United	Box Hill Pioneers-St Peters	Canterbury-North Balwyn	Lower Plenty	East Bentleigh	5 divisions (1975-1989)
1985	Burwood United	Mazenod Old Collegians	Balwyn Combined	Springvale Districts	Hawthorn YCW	5 divisions (1975-1989)
1984	Syndal-Tally Ho	Oakleigh Sacred Heart	Aquinas Old Boys	Black Rock	Sandringham Sacred Heart	5 divisions (1975-1989)
1983	Burwood United	St Leos Wattle Park	Mazenod Old Collegians	Aquinas Old Boys	Springvale Districts	5 divisions (1975-1989)
1982	Syndal-Tally Ho	Glen Waverley	East Camberwell	St Anthonys Glenhuntly	St Patricks Mentone	5 divisions (1975-1989)
1981	Emmanuel	Trinity Presbyterian	Glen Waverley	St Pauls Bentleigh	Mazenod Old Collegians	5 divisions (1975-1989)
1980	St Marys Church of England	Box Hill Adelphians	Trinity Presbyterian	St Marys East Malvern	Black Rock	5 divisions (1975-1989)
1979	St Marys Church of England	Syndal Baptist	St Andrews Box Hill	St Leos Wattle Park	Lower Plenty	5 divisions (1975-1989)
1978	St Marys Church of England	Hampton United	Brighton United	Mount Waverley Catholics	St Leos Wattle Park	5 divisions (1975-1989)
1977	Donvale United	South Caulfield	St Georges Reservoir	OLV-South Camberwell	Blackburn Baptist	5 divisions (1975-1989)
1976	Emmanuel Church of England	Syndal Baptist	Malvern South Methodist	St Georges Reservoir	Cheltenham United	5 divisions (1975-1989)
1975	St Marys Church of England	Oakleigh Sacred Heart	St Anthonys Glenhuntly	Box Hill Methodist	Elwood	5 divisions (1975-1989)
	A	B	C1	C2	D1	D2
1974	Canterbury Presbyterian	North Balwyn Methodist	Box Hill Adelphians	Chadstone Salesian	St Marys East Malvern	5 divisions (1974)
1973	Donvale United	Syndal Baptist	Oakleigh Sacred Heart	Wattle Park Presbyterian	Our Lady's Wattle Park	Chadstone Salesian
	A	B	C	D	E	
1972	Donvale United	Trinity Presbyterian	Hampton Methodist	Preston Methodist	Noble Park Methodist	5 divisions (1968-1972)
1971	Box Hill Pioneers	Wattle Park Presbyterian	North Balwyn Methodist	South Yarra Presbyterian	Ormond Church of Christ	5 divisions (1968-1972)
1970	Emmanuel Church of England	Highfield Road Methodist	Blackburn North Baptist	North Balwyn Church of Christ	Gardiner Church of Christ	5 divisions (1968-1972)
1969	Box Hill Pioneers	Trinity Presbyterian	East Kew Combined	Blackburn Baptist	North Blackburn Methodist	5 divisions (1968-1972)
1968	Burwood United	Camberwell Baptist	Syndal Baptist	Bentleigh Methodist	Cheltenham Church of Christ	5 divisions (1968-1972)
1967	Box Hill Pioneers	Wattle Park Presbyterian	Clayton Methodist	Syndal Baptist	4 divisions (1965-1967)	
1966	North Balwyn Methodist	Ashburton Methodist	Elsternwick United	Burwood United 3rds	4 divisions (1965-1967)	
1965	Highfield Road Methodist	Box Hill Pioneers	St Andrews Presbyterian	Burwood United 3rds	4 divisions (1965-1967)	
1964	Burwood United	North Balwyn Methodist	Box Hill Pioneers	3 divisions (1955-1964)		
1963	Highfield Road Methodist	Burwood United	Emmanuel Church of England	3 divisions (1955-1964)		
1962	Trinity Presbyterian	Malvern South Methodist	Burwood United	3 divisions (1955-1964)		
1961	Trinity Presbyterian	Hampton Methodist	Camberwell Church of Christ	3 divisions (1955-1964)		
1960	Surrey Hills Presbyterian	St Marys Church of England	Hartwell Presbyterian	3 divisions (1955-1964)		
1959	Trinity Presbyterian	St Peters Church of England	Hampton Methodist	3 divisions (1955-1964)		
1958	Trinity Presbyterian	Camberwell Baptist	Box Hill Methodist	3 divisions (1955-1964)		
1957	Burwood United	Elsternwick United	Burwood United 2nds	3 divisions (1955-1964)		
1956	Trinity Presbyterian	Malvern Combined	Camberwell Baptist	3 divisions (1955-1964)		
1955	Burwood United	St Georges Presbyterian	Trinity Presbyterian 2nds	3 divisions (1955-1964)		
1954	Trinity Presbyterian	St Stephens Presbyterian	St Peters Church of England	Box Hill Adelphians 2nds	4 divisions (1947-1954)	
1953	Burwood United	Balwyn Combined	Elsternwick United	Murrumbeena United	4 divisions (1947-1954)	
1952	Burwood United	Trinity Presbyterian	Glen Iris United	St Oswalds Church of England	4 divisions (1947-1954)	
1951	Canterbury Presbyterian	St Colombs Church of England	Trinity Presbyterian	South Yarra Church of Christ	4 divisions (1947-1954)	
1950	Box Hill Adelphians	South Camberwell United	East Malvern Presbyterian	St Georges Presbyterian	4 divisions (1947-1954)	
1949	Burwood United	West Hawthorn United	Caulfield Church of Christ	East Malvern Presbyterian	4 divisions (1947-1954)	
1948	Hartwell Presbyterian	Blackburn United	Surrey Hills Combined	Caulfield Church of Christ	4 divisions (1947-1954)	
1947	Gardiner Church of Christ	Hawthorn Methodist	Glen Iris United	East Malvern Presbyterian	4 divisions (1947-1954)	
1946	Hartwell Presbyterian	St Columbs Church of Christ	St Stephens Presbyterian	3 divisions (1946)		
1945	Balwyn Church of Christ	Church of Christ Combined	2 divisions (1936-1945)			
1942-1944	No competition due to WWII		2 divisions (1936-1945)			
1941	Spring Road Methodist	Hawthorn Methodist	2 divisions (1936-1945)			
1940	Burwood Protestant	Gardiner Church of Christ	2 divisions (1936-1945)			
1939	Balwyn United	Elsternwick Methodist	2 divisions (1936-1945)			
1938	Surrey Hills Church of Christ	Highfield Baptist	2 divisions (1936-1945)			
1937	Balwyn United	Burwood Presbyterian	2 divisions (1936-1945)			
1936	South Hawthorn United	St Marys Church of England	2 divisions (1936-1945)			
1935	Kew United	Surrey Hills Church of Christ	Camberwell Methodist	3 divisions (1933-1935)		
1934	South Hawthorn United	Balwyn Baptist	Spring Road Methodist	3 divisions (1933-1935)		
1933	Canterbury Baptist	Kew United	Rathmines United	3 divisions (1933-1935)		
1932	South Hawthorn United	Ormond United	2 divisions (1929-1932)			
1931	South Hawthorn United	Elsternwick Methodist	2 divisions (1929-1932)			
1930	Canterbury United	Balwyn Baptist	2 divisions (1929-1932)			
1929	Canterbury United	St Columb's Church of England	2 divisions (1929-1932)			
1928	Box Hill Methodist	1 division (1923-1928)				
1927	Malvern Methodist	1 division (1923-1928)				
1926	Hawthorn Presbyterian	1 division (1923-1928)				
1925	Box Hill Methodist	1 division (1923-1928)				
1924	Hawthorn Presbyterian	1 division (1923-1928)				
1923	Kew Presbyterian	1 division (1923-1928)				
