= Doveton Football Club =

Australian football club

Names
- Full name: Doveton Football Club
- Nickname: Doves

Club details
- Founded: 1959; 67 years ago
- Colours: Black, Green
- Competition: Southern FL
- Ground: ROBINSON OVAL, Cnr Oak Avenue and Paperbark Street, Doveton

Uniforms
Home

Other information
- Official website: http://dovetonfnc.com.au

The Doveton Football Club is an Australian rules football club which plays in the Southern FNL.

== History ==
Founded in 1959, the Doves commenced senior football in the South West Gippsland Football League, taking a decade to win their first premiership in 1969. Doveton seeking greater competition transferred to the strong Federal Football League for five years from 1972. The club won 22 games out of 86 games.

The club returned to the SWGFL in 1977 and was particularly successful during the late 1970s and early 1980s when it won four premierships in six years.

In 1995 the SWGFL was absorbed by the Mornington Peninsula Nepean Football League and Doveton regularly made the finals but never won a Grand Final. The club won the premiership in the Casey Cardinia League 2015 grand final by defeating Narre Warren.

Doveton was one of nine founding clubs of the South East Football Netball League in 2015. Four years later the league merged with the Yarra Valley Mountain Football League to create the Outer East Football Netball League where, competing in Division One competition, they won the Grand Final against Pakenham.

The club moved to the Southern FNL in 2022 after two years of Covid interrupted seasons.

== Leagues and Premierships ==
- South West Gippsland FL (1959–1971)
  - 1969
- Federal Football League (1972–1976)
  - No premierships
- South West Gippsland FL (1977–1994)
  - 1983, 1984, 1985, 1988
- Mornington Peninsula Nepean FL (1995–2004)
  - No Premierships
- Casey Cardinia FL (2005–2014)
  - 2005
- South East FNL (2015–2018)
  - No Premierships
- Outer East FNL (2019–2021)
  - 2019
- Southern FNL (2022-)
  - No Premierships

== VFL/AFL players ==
- Josh Battle - St. Kilda
- Ron Beattie - Hawthorn
- Don Henwood - Footscray
- Connor MacDonald - Hawthorn
- Scott Simister - Melbourne
- John Walker - Collingwood
- Daniel Wulf - St. Kilda

== External Sources ==
Official Site
