= Dandenong West Football Club =

Names
- Full name: Dandenong West Football Netball Club
- Former name(s): Dandenong West Junior Football Club (1963−84); Dandenong Demons Football Club (2003−08); Dandenong Football Club (2008−15); Dandenong Football and Netball Club (2015−23)
- Nickname(s): Westerners, DW, Westies
- Former nickname(s): Demons, Redlegs

Club details
- Founded: December 1963; 62 years ago
- Competition: Southern Football Netball League
- President: Matt McCabe
- Coach: Mick Lawrence

Uniforms
Home	Former

Other information
- Official website: dandenongfnc.com

The Dandenong West Football Club, nicknamed the Westerners, is an Australian rules football and netball club based in the Melbourne suburb of Dandenong West.

As of 2024, the club competes in Division 4 of the Southern Football Netball League (SFNL).

== History ==
Dandenong West was formed in December 1963 as the Dandenong West Junior Football Club, fielding boys teams of various age groups. In 1984, the club had enough senior players to enter the South East Suburban Football League (SESFL), before moving to the Eastern Suburban Churches Football Association (ESCFA) in 1987.

In 1993, the Southern Football League (SFL, now SFNL) absorbed the ESCFA, and Dandenong West entered the SFL. The club finished sixth in Division 3 in its inaugural SFL season.

In 2004, Dandenong West was renamed to the Dandenong Demons. The club's nickname was then changed to the "Redlegs" in 2008, the same as the Dandenong Football Club that competed in the Victorian Football Association (VFA) from 1958 until 1994.

In 2015, the club entered a netball team in the newly-renamed SFNL for the first time, winning the Division 6 grand final in its first season. The club was also renamed to the Dandenong Football and Netball Club (or Dandenong Football Netball Club).

On 27 July 2023, the club announced it would return to the Dandenong West name, beginning in the 2024 season. The club was officially renamed on 23 November 2023, and a logo and colours were revealed in December 2023.

== Notable players ==
- Ricky Jackson, former Melbourne VFL/AFL player
- Mick Reid, who played 500 senior games for the club
