= Bentleigh Football Netball Club =

Bentleigh

Names
- Full name: Bentleigh Football Netball Club
- Nickname(s): Demons, Dees
- Former nickname(s): Terriers, Bulldogs

Club details
- Founded: 1965; 61 years ago
- Colours: Red Navy blue
- Competition: Southern Football Netball League
- President: Paul Dimattina
- Ground: Arthur Street Reserve, Arthur Street, Bentleigh
- Training ground: Arthur Street Reserve, Arthur Street, Bentleigh

Uniforms
| Home | Away | Clash |

Other information
- Official website: https://www.bentleighfnc.com/

The Bentleigh Football Netball Club is an Australian rules football and netball club located in the southern suburbs of Melbourne. The football team participates in the First Division Southern Football Netball League, based in the south and south-eastern suburbs of Melbourne.

== History ==
The club was established in 1965, and was originally called Bentleigh Methodists Football Club. In 1965 the club had enough seniors to enter the Eastern Suburban Churches Football Association D grade and won nine and lost nine games.

In 1968 the club won their first premiership downing Mont Albert by 98 points. Promoted to C grade, the club lost the C grade grand final in 1970 and the B grade in 1971. The ESCFA had a system of both Grand Finals teams got promoted so to avoid the risk of a side playing dead so not to get promoted. By 1972 they were in A grade.

In 1977 following the merger of the Methodist and Presbyterians Churches to form the Uniting Church of Australia, the club became Bentleigh Uniting. Later the ESCFA would drop the required for a football club to be aligned to a church, so the club shortened its name to Bentleigh in the hope of broadening support among the Bentleigh community

The absorption of the ESCFA by the Southern FL in 1993 meant the club was in the new league until 1999.

The rising costs of players payments and the caused the club to join the Amateurs in 2000. The club competed in the VAFA until 2010, along the way they won the (D3) premiership in 2009.

In 2011 the club rejoined the Southern FL and played off in the 2011 Div 2 Grand Final going down to Highett. In 2013 they won the Division 2 premiership, winning 13.7 85 to Mordialloc 10.13.73

In 2015 the name became Bentleigh Football and Netball Club to include the netballers and acknowledge the efforts they put in for the club.

=== 1960s ===
==== First Season - The Beginning ====
| 9 wins | 9 losses |
| Highest Score | 19.14.128 |
| Lowest Score | 2.4.16 |
| First President | Ralph Phillips |
| First Coach | Geoff Mason |
| First Captain | Alan Clissold |
| First Best and Fairest Winner | Bruce Aitken |
| First Leading Goal Scorer | Bruce Aitken – (51 Goals) |
| First Ground | King George Oval, East Bentleigh |

The Bentleigh football club was formed on 10 February 1965, its first committee being elected on 4 March 1965. The club, known as the “Terriers “, entered one senior team in D grade of the Eastern Suburbs Protestant Churches Football Association (E.S.P.C.F.A.) and played its games at the King George VI Memorial Park, East Bentleigh.

In its first season, under coach Geoff Mason, the club finished fifth, winning nine games and losing nine. The highlight of the year was Bruce Aitkens achievement in winning the associations best and fairest award. Over the next two seasons the club, although not reaching the finals, consolidated its position within the association, both in terms of administration and the strength and size of its player list.

A significant event during the period was the clubs moved to the Mackie Road reserve, East Bentleigh, which was to be at home ground for 21 years. The 1968 season proved to be a significant one in the club's brief history. With the grace and playing schools, the club was able to feel the second side which played in E grade of the E.S.P.C.F.A. The senior side, under the guidance of playing coach, Geoff Mason, finished on top of the ladder and defeated Mount Albert in the grand final by 98 points. The club produced its first 100-goal season goalkicker, Bruce Aitkin, who kicked 108 goals, and seconds captain coach, Bob Tidball, won the first of his three association best and fairest awards.

=== 1970s ===
The Period 1969-1975 was a very successful period for Bentleigh with the club being represented in finals in all but one year. The senior side went from C grade in 1969 to A grade in 1972 playing in two losing grand finals with the margins of six points in 1970 and 12 points in 1971. The seconds side played in five final series, finishing runner up in 1974 and 1975. Other highlights of this period was seconds captain coach, Bob Tidball, won two association best and fairest awards, club Captain John Lily, winning the association a great best and fairest in 1972, champion ruckman, John Delaney, winning the association a great best and fairest 1974, the achievements of full forward, Bruce Aitkin, who kicked 100 goals or better, twice, and the establishment of a Thirds side who played as U/17's in 1972.

During this period, the club changed its logo from the “Terriers “to the “Bulldogs “and the competition change to the Eastern Suburbs Churches Football Association (E.S.C.F.A.)

The club had a low period in season 1977 with the senior side failing to win a game and the second is losing all before games. The club was moved to B grade for the 1978 season. Although the seniors failed to make the finals in 1978, the season was relatively successful for the club, with the second undercoat Bob Tidball, defeating Glenhuntly in the grand final by 77 points, and Dennis Stringer achievement in winning the Association second best and fairest award.

=== 1980s ===
For the second time in two years, the club had a low point with both the seniors and second is winning very few games, resulting in Bentleigh been moved to see grade for the 1980s season. Although experiencing limited success on the playing field, the 1980 season was a turning point to the club with the installation of a professional coaching panel, and the plane coach, Dennis crazier, and, for the first time, and nonchurch affiliated administration under president, Garry Matlock, and second to secretary, Mark Seymour.

With the return to Bentleigh of some key from the players, the “dragons “, as they were now known, experienced a resurgence in their playing fortunes in 1981 with the seniors being runner-up to Glenwaverly in the C grade grand final, and the seconds, under coach, Pete Farnsworth, defeating Highfield by 53 points to win the premiership.

1982 had both the seniors and seconds finishing on top of the B grade ladders at the conclusion of the home and away season. The seconds, underplaying coach, Alan White, defeated Mount Waverly in the grand final by 29 points. The seniors unfortunately lost a preliminary final by seven points. A highlight of the season with the goalkicking efforts of seconds playing coach, Alan White, he kicked a club record of 209 goals. His best results of the home and away games were 38.3 against box Hill Adelphians. On this day the sidekick to club record of 50 goals 26 behinds (326 points). The club experienced limited success on the field over the next five years with the seniors making the finals only once and the seconds, twice. This period, however, was significant as the club formed an alliance with the Bentleigh junior football club. This alliance would have both short-term and long-term benefits for both organisations.

The 1988 season saw the arrival of many young players, along with their parents, who took on important administrative roles within the club. Of equal significance was the clubs move to the Bentleigh recreation reserve, Bentleigh, which is excellent playing and social facilities. Both the seniors and second is finished in the lower halves of their respective letters, however the thirds, and to coach, John Smith, playing is under and 18, defeated St.Kilda city to win the premiership.

1989 was a resurgence year for Bentleigh and its playing fortunes, with both their seniors and second is finishing on top of their respective ladders. Success, however, was not to follow in the finals, with the seniors losing the preliminary final and the second is loose in the grand final.

=== 1990s ===
The 1990 home and away season was almost a carbon copy of the previous year, with both the seconds and seniors finishing on top. For the first time in its history, the club experience the ultimate in final success, with the seniors, and a plane coach, Paul Dimattina, defeating Richmond by 74 points to win the grand final, and the seconds, and a coach, Alan Jones, defeating Richmond by 57 points to win the grand final.

1991 saw Bentleigh return to a grade football for the first time since 1977, with both the seniors and second is finishing their seasons in fifth place. The seniors once again finished fifth in 1992. The second is finished on top of the ladder at the end of the home and away season, but unfortunately lost the preliminary final.

1992 season was to be the last for the eastern suburbs’ churches football Association. The E.S.C.F.A. combined with the Southern football league at the end of 1992 to form a new metropolitan football competition.

In 1993 Bentleigh football club played in the Premier division of the new, five division, Southern football league against clubs, the journey of which, part of the old south east of bourbon and federal football leagues.

== League Participation ==
=== Eastern Suburbs Churches Football Association ===
(1925–1992)

- Absorbed by the Southern Football League

=== Southern Football League ===
(1993-1999)

- The absorption of the ESCFA by the Southern FL in 1993 meant the club was in the new league until 1999.

=== Victorian Amateur Football Association ===
(2000-2010)

- The rising costs of players payments and the caused the club to join the Amateurs in 2000. The club competed in the VAFA until 2010, along the way they won the (D3) premiership in 2009.

=== Southern Football Netball League ===
(2011-Current)

- In 2011 the club rejoined the Southern FL and played off in the 2011 Div 2 Grand Final going down to Highett.

==== Division 1 2019 ====
| Club | Nickname | Location Ground | Website | Years in Comp | SFL Premierships |
|---|---|---|---|---|---|
| Bentleigh | Demons | Bentleigh Reserve | Official Site | 1993- | Div 2: 2013 |
| Cheltenham | Rosellas | Cheltenham Reserve | Official Site | 1982- | Div 2: 1992, 1993, 1995 |
| Dingley | Dingoes | Souter Oval, Dingley | Official Site | 2007- | Div 1: 2015, 2016, 2017 Div 2: 2008 |
| East Malvern (Known as Tooronga/Malvern until 2012) | Panthers | Lucas Oval, Malvern East | Official Site | 1964- | A2: 1978, 1985, 1990 Div 2: 2012 Div 3: 2001 |
| Highett (known as Highett Districts until 1997) | Bulldogs | Turner Road Reserve, Highett | Official Site | 1989- | Div 2: 2004, 2011, 2018 Div 3: 1996 |
| Mordialloc | Bloodhounds | Ben Kavanagh Reserve, Mordialloc | Official Site | 1988– | Div 2: 1999, 2014 |
| Oakleigh District | Districts | Princes Highway Reserve, Oakleigh East | Official Site | 1963, 1982- | Div 2: 2015 |
| Port Melbourne | Colts | JL Murphy Reserve, Port Melbourne | Official Site | 1975-80, 2016- | A2 1975 Div 2: 2016 |
| St Kilda City | Saints | Peanut Farm Reserve, St Kilda | Official Site | 1965- | A2: 1971, 1980 Div 1: 2002, 2007, 2009, 2010 Div 2: 1998, 2005 Div 3: 1994 |
| St Pauls | Bulldogs | McKinnon Reserve, Bentleigh | Official Site | 1993- | Div 1: 2008, 2011, 2013, 2018 |

== Football and Netball Teams ==
- Men's Senior team
- Seven Teams, One club.
- Women's Football
- Women's Netball
- Men's Under Nineteens Football

=== Committee Officials 2021 ===
| PAUL DIMATTINA | SARAH RADLOW | GARY MORGAN |
| President | Communications Coordinator | Facilities Manager |
| BRETT COOPER | PAUL NANKERVIS | Russell Holmesby |
| Senior Vice President | Welfare Officer | Club Historian |
| JAMES COLES | JEFF MACKIE | JEFF MACKIE |
| Junior Vice President | Football Manager | Licensed Bar Manager |
| JAYDE O'BRIEN | OLIVIA SCOTT | GARRY MATLOCK |
| Public Officer | Women's Netball Coordinator | General Manager |
| MARK EYLES | Taryn McGaw | DANNY MOUNTT |
| Treasurer | Functions Coordinator | Merchandise Coordinator |

== Bentleigh Football Netball Club Theme ==
=== Grand Old Flag ===
It’s a grand old flag, it’s a high flying flag,

It’s the emblem for me and for you,

It’s the emblem of the team we love,

The team of the Red and the Blue.

Every heart beats true, for the Red and the Blue,

And we sing this song to you,

Should old acquaintance be forgot,

Keep your eye on the Red and the Blue.

== Premierships ==
1968 E.S.P.C.F.A. D GRADE

Bentleigh Methodists – 21.13.139 defeated Mont Albert Methodists – 6.5.41.

Coach – Geoff Mason

Team Managers – Ralph Phillips and Jim Meneilly

1978 E.S.C.F.A. B RESERVES

Bentleigh Methodists – 17.10.122 defeated Glenhuntly/St.Anthony's -6.9.45.

Coach – Bob Tidball

Team Managers – David Clement

1981 E.S.C.F.A. B RESERVES

Bentleigh Uniting – 12.14.92 defeated Highfield Methodists – 4.9.33.

Coach – Peter Farnsworth

Team Manager – David Clement

1982 E.S.C.F.A. B RESERVES

Bentleigh Uniting – 15.22.112 defeated Mount Waverly Catholics – 12.11.83.

Coach – Alan White

Team Manager – David Clement

1988 S.E.D.D.C.F.C. UNDER 18’S

Bentleigh Uniting defeated St.Kilda City

Coach – John Smith

Team Manager – Brian Tobin

1990 E.S.C.F.A. B GRADE

Bentleigh Uniting – 20.9.129 defeated Richmond Central – 8.7.55.

Coach – Paul Dimattina

Team Manager – Brian Tobin

1990 E.S.C.F.A. RESERVES

Bentleigh Uniting – 17.9.111 defeated Richmond Central – 7.12.54.

Coach – Alan Jones

Team Manager – Garry Matlock and Gary Pickering

== Life Members ==
=== Life Members 1965 - 2018 ===
| BOB TIDBALL | STEVE BUNCE | JOHN DONALD | ROSS HALL | JOEL SEELY | CHRIS SHARP | BRIAN HENRY |
| KEN MENEILLY | DAVID CROZIER | WAYNE HEWITT | CAMERON MCCULLOCH | PAUL DIMATTINA | STEVE HALL | MICHAEL LEE |
| BRUCE AITKIN | DAVID KIDD | MORRIS JAMES | MARK MCCULLOCH | RALPH PHILLIPS | DEAN RICHARDS | JAMES ROBERTSON |
| PETER HISCOCK | DAVID PEARSON | NEIL STRUDWICK | GLEN PHELAN | JIM MENEILLY | PAUL JEMMESON | JEFF MACKIE |
| ROBERT HUTHER | DENNIS STRUDWICK | CRAIG JAMES | DAVID GOLD | ALLAN FULLARTON | BEN PADGHAM | GLENN RICHARDS |
| JOHN LILLEY | DARREL WILLIAMS | GARY MORGAN | PAUL HUTCHISON | GARY WICKS | RYAN FISHLOCK | LAURIE FITZPATRICK |
| IAN LONGMUIR | PHILLIP ANTHONY | DOUG COWLISHAW | GRAEME BEATTIE | PADDY CROZIER | CHRIS SMITH | ANDY LEE |
| GARRY MATLOCK | GREG CLOUGH | STEVE KIDD | GREG PICKERING | GERALD LAVERS | SCOTT KENNEDY | CHRIS FIDLER |
| DENNIS STRINGER | JOHN DELANEY | GREG KNIGHT | PHIL WITHINGTON | MARK BACKMAN | DAVID MARTIN | ANDREW WEST |
| RUSSEL ANTHONY | ALLAN JONES | GLEN ELMI | DAVID MANNING | BARRY NEVE | LIBBY MATLOCK | SHAUN ADAWAY |
