= Eastern Suburban Football League =

- Most recent season or competition: 1962
- Sport: Australian rules football
- Founded: 1932
- First season: 1932
- Folded: 1962
- No. of teams: 12 (1962), 46 (historical)
- Country: Australia
- Last champion: Burnley (1962)
- Most titles: Auburn, Burnley (6)
- Related competitions: Federal FL; Caulfield Oakleigh District FL; Southern FNL

The Eastern Suburban Football League (ESFL) was an Australian rules football competition based in Melbourne's eastern suburbs that ran for 30 years between 1932 and 1962.

== History ==
The Eastern Suburban Football League was first proposed in January 1932 when representatives from Balwyn, Box Hill City, Canterbury, Deepdene and Hartwell met at the Hawthorn Football Club with the intention of forming a local football league. It was officially founded in March when representatives from Balwyn, Box Hill City, Canterbury, Glen Iris, South Camberwell and Tooronga met and drew up a constitution for the new league. Many of these clubs had previously competed in the VFL Sub-Districts competition, which they felt favoured clubs based in northern Melbourne over eastern clubs and also contained some clubs with unsavoury supporters. It was felt that forming a local eastern league would be a favourable solution to this problem. The first games of the new competition occurred on April 30, 1932, with Caulfield City also entering the ESFL. South Camberwell won the first premiership, defeating Canterbury in a challenge final.

The ESFL expanded quickly, adding 5 new clubs (Hartwell, Deepdene, Surrey Hills, East Hawthorn and Glen Waverley) in 1933 and another 4 (Ormond, East Malvern, Box Hill East and Kew District) in 1934. After Auburn joined for the 1935 season, South Camberwell and Glen Waverley departed and Box Hill East merged with Box Hill City, the league was left with 17 clubs - an unwieldy number which saw it divide into two grades for the first time.

The ESFL became the first league to cancel its affiliation with the Victorian Football Union midway through the 1939 season, as they felt the VFU did not do enough to prevent star ESFL players from being poached by other leagues. The league did not officially resign from the VFU, however, which allowed it to keep using VFU umpires and ignore any player clearances submitted. This was not discovered until midway through the 1940 season, whereupon the VFU banned the ESFL, preventing any VFU players from transferring to the ESFL. This ban was mostly ignored by the ESFL, which went into recess after the 1941 season due to World War II.

Upon reforming in 1945 the ESFL split into an East and West section, as petrol rationing meant that it was difficult for clubs to travel over the large area the league had come to cover. By 1950 the league had returned to a more traditional A-B-C grade system.

The 1950s proved to be trying times for the ESFL. The growing Croydon Ferntree Gully Football League began picking off clubs - first Ringwood in 1954, then Surrey Hills and Mitcham in 1955, Vermont in 1958, Blackburn and East Burwood in 1960 and Doncaster and Nunawading in 1961. With only 12 clubs left in 1962 the ESFL was left with no choice but to look for a merger, and after the season joined with the Caulfield-Oakleigh District Football League to form the South East Suburban Football League for 1963.

== Clubs ==
=== Final ===
==== First Division ====
Club	Jumper	Nickname	Home Ground	Former League	Est.	Years in ESFL	ESFL Senior Premierships		Fate
Club	Jumper	Nickname	Home Ground	Former League	Est.	Years in ESFL	Total	Most recent	Fate
Auburn			Victoria Road Reserve, Hawthorn East	VSDFL	c.1920	1935–1962	6	1950	Folded after 1962 season
Balwyn	(1932–40) (1956–62)	Tigers	Balwyn Park, Balwyn	VSDFL, VAFA	1909	1932–1940, 1956–1962	2	1934	Formed South East Suburban FL after 1963 season
Burnley			Burnley Oval, Burnley	VJFA	1920s	1940–1962	6	1962	Formed South East Suburban FL after 1963 season
Burwood		Woods	Burwood Reserve, Glen Iris	ESPCFA	1940s	1959–1962	0	-	Formed South East Suburban FL after 1963 season
Canterbury		Cobras	Canterbury Sports Ground, Surrey Hills	VSDFL	1881	1932–1962	1	1956	Formed South East Suburban FL after 1963 season
Glen Iris		Gladiators	Eric Raven Reserve, Glen Iris	–	1932	1932–1962	3	1956*	Formed South East Suburban FL after 1963 season
Hawthorn Amateurs			Victoria Road Reserve, Hawthorn East	VAFA	1954	1958–1962	0	-	Formed South East Suburban FL after 1963 season
North Kew		Bears	Stradbroke Park, Kew East	–	1932	1945–1962	2	1960*	Formed South East Suburban FL after 1963 season
Tooronga			Johnson Oval, Tooronga Park, Malvern	VSDFL	1919	1932–1962	0	-	Formed South East Suburban FL after 1963 season

*won in lower division

==== Second Division ====
Club	Jumper	Nickname	Home Ground	Former League	Est.	Years in ESFL	ESFL Senior Premierships		Fate
Club	Jumper	Nickname	Home Ground	Former League	Est.	Years in ESFL	Total	Most recent	Fate
Balwyn B	(1932–40) (1956–62)	Tigers	Balwyn Park, Balwyn	VSDFL, VAFA	1909	1932–1940, 1956–1962	2	1934	Formed South East Suburban FL after 1963 season
Bennettswood		Swans	Bennettswood Reserve, Burwood	–	1959	1959–1962	1	1962	Formed South East Suburban FL after 1963 season
Burwood B		Woods	Burwood Reserve, Glen Iris	ESPCFA	1940s	1959–1962	0	-	Formed South East Suburban FL after 1963 season
Canterbury B		Cobras	Canterbury Sports Ground, Surrey Hills	VSDFL	1881	1932–1962	1	1956	Formed South East Suburban FL after 1963 season
Caulfield Amateurs			Caulfield Park, Caulfield North		1946	1962	0	-	Formed South East Suburban FL after 1963 season
Deepdene	Dark with lighter vee		Deepdene Park, Deepdene	–	1933	1933–1962	0	-	Folded after 1962 season
Glen Iris B		Gladiators	Eric Raven Reserve, Glen Iris	–	1932	1932–1962	3	1956*	Formed South East Suburban FL after 1963 season
Tooronga B			Johnson Oval, Tooronga Park, Malvern	VSDFL	1919	1932–1962	0	-	Formed South East Suburban FL after 1963 season

=== Former ===
Club	Jumper	Nickname	Home Ground	Former League	Est.	Years in ESFL	ESFL Senior Premierships		Fate
Club	Jumper	Nickname	Home Ground	Former League	Est.	Years in ESFL	Total	Most recent	Fate
Ashburton		Dragons	Ashburton Reserve, Ashburton	–	1940s	1946–1960	1	1953	Moved to Caulfield-Oakleigh District FL after 1960 season
Blackburn	(?-1950-?)(1936-?, ?-1960)	Panthers	Morton Park, Blackburn	RDFL	1890	1936–1960	3	1952	Moved to Croydon-Ferntree Gully FL after 1960 season
Box Hill		White Horses	Whitehorse Reserve, Box Hill	–	1936	1936–1950	1	1939	Moved to VFA after 1950 season
Box Hill City			Whitehorse Reserve, Box Hill	ESPCFA	1920s	1932–1935	0	-	Merged with Box Hill East to form Box Hill after 1935 season
Box Hill East						1934–1935	0	-	Merged with Box Hill City to form Box Hill after 1935 season
Caulfield City			Caulfield Park, Caulfield North	CODJFA	1924	1932–1941	1	1940	Moved to Caulfield-Oakleigh District FL in 1946 after WWII
Doncaster	(1941)(?-1961)	Sharks	Schramms Reserve, Doncaster	RDFL	1902	1938–1961	1	1939	Moved to Croydon-Ferntree Gully FL after 1961 season
East Burwood		Rams	East Burwood Reserve, East Burwood	VFDFL	1910	1939–1960	1	1954	Moved to Croydon-Ferntree Gully FL after 1960 season
East Caulfield						1935–1937	0	-	Unknown after 1937. Played in VAFA between 1946 and 1953.
East Hawthorn		Hawks	St. James Park, Hawthorn	ESPCFA	1931	1933–1954	5	1954	Moved to Metropolitan FL after 1954 season
East Malvern (East Malvern District 1934-37)		Demons	Waverley Oval, Malvern East	–	1934	1934–1945	0	-	Moved to Caulfield-Oakleigh District FL after 1945 season
East Kew			Victoria Park, Kew	–	1937	1937–1940, 1945	1	1938	Moved to CYMSFA in 1947
East Ringwood		Roos	East Ringwood Reserve, East Ringwood	CDFL	1929	1950	0	-	Moved to Croydon-Ferntree Gully FL after 1950 season
Glenferrie District			Glenferrie Oval, Hawthorn	–	1936	1936–1941	0	-	U18 side connected with Hawthorn. Did not reform after WWII.
Glenhuntly		Hunters	Glen Huntly Park, Caulfield East	ESFL	1900s	1950–1952	0	-	Moved to Caulfield-Oakleigh District FL after 1945 season
Glen-Orme			Koornang Park, Carnegie	VFDFL	1946	1951–1953	0	-	Folded after 1953 season
Glen Waverley			Central Reserve, Glen Waverley	VSDFL	1908	1933–1934	0	-	Moved to Victorian Federal Districts FL after 1934 season
Great Eastern			Deepdene Park, Deepdene	–	1947	1947	0	-	Folded after 1947 season
Hartwell		Wellers	Hartwell Sports Ground, Glen Iris	ESPCFA	1920s	1933–1937	1	1936	Returned to Eastern Suburban Protestant Churches FA after 1937 season
Hawthorn Boys Club				–	1949	1949–1950	0	-	Folded after 1950 season
Kew District		Districts	Victoria Park, Kew	VSDFL	1922	1934–1938	0	-	Folded after 1938 season
Mitcham		Tigers	Walker Park, Mitcham	RDFL	1888	1938–1955	1	1952	Moved to Croydon-Ferntree Gully FL after 1955 season
Noble Park		Tigers	Pat Wright Senior Oval, Noble Park	DDFA	1918	1954	0	-	Moved to Caulfield-Oakleigh District FL after 1954 season
Nunawading		Lions	Nunawading Recreation Reserve, Nunawading	RDFL	1927	1946–1961	1	1955	Moved to Croydon-Ferntree Gully FL after 1961 season
Ormond seconds		Monders	EE Gunn Reserve, Ormond	–	1932	1934–1939	0	-	Disbanded due to loss of players to WWII enlistments.
Parkfield			Parkfield Reserve, Noble Park	–	1954	1954–1957	0	-	Moved to Caulfield-Oakleigh District FL after 1957 season
Richmond City			Citizens Park, Richmond	VJFA	1890s	1940–1941	0	-	Merged with Burnley after WWII.
Ringwood		Magpies	Jubilee Park, Ringwood	RDFL	1899	1945–1954	1	1951	Moved to Croydon-Ferntree Gully FL after 1954 season
Ruwolts				SMIL		1940	0	-	Folded after 1940 season
South Camberwell			Howard Dawson Reserve, Glen Iris	VSDFL	1920s	1932–1936	1	1932	Moved to VAFA after 1936 season
State Electricity Commission				SMIL		1941, 1946	0	-	Moved to VAFA after 1947 season
Surrey Hills			Surrey Park, Box Hill	MAFA	1887	1933–1955	1	1937	Moved to Croydon-Ferntree Gully FL after 1955 season
Templestowe		Stowers, Maroons	Templestowe Reserve, Templestowe	DVFL	1892	1946, 1955–1961	0	-	Moved to Diamond Valley FL after 1946 and 1961 season
Vermont		Eagles	Vermont Recreation Reserve, Vermont	VFDFL	1919	1937–1958	2	1958	Moved to Croydon-Ferntree Gully FL after 1958 season

=== Premierships ===
Year	1st Division			2nd Division	C grade
1962	Burnley			Bennettswood	No comp (1961–62
1961	Burnley			Doncaster B	No comp (1961–62
1960	East Ringwood			North Kew	Doncaster B
1959	Burnley			Hawthorn Amateurs	Blackburn B
1958	Burnley			Vermont	Canterbury B
1957	North Kew			Burnley	Canterbury B
1956	Canterbury			Glen Iris	Canterbury B
1955	Vermont			Nunawading	Vermont B
1954	East Hawthorn			East Burwood	Ashburton B
1953	East Hawthorn			Ashburton	Tooronga B
1952	Mitcham			Blackburn	Canterbury B
1951	Ringwood			Glen Iris	Canterbury B
1950	Auburn			Blackburn	Deepdene B
	Overall premier	East	West	No comp (1945–1949)	B grade/2nd Eighteens
1949	Auburn	Ringwood	Auburn	No comp (1945–1949)	Canterbury B
1948	?	Ringwood	Auburn	No comp (1945–1949)	Canterbury B
1947	Auburn	Mitcham	Auburn	No comp (1945–1949)	Ringwood B
1946	East Hawthorn	Box Hill	East Hawthorn	No comp (1945–1949)	Glen Iris B
1945	Glen Iris	Box Hill	Glen Iris	No comp (1945–1949)	No comp (1945)
1944	ESFL in recess during WWII				
1943	ESFL in recess during WWII				
1942	ESFL in recess during WWII				
1941	East Hawthorn			Blackburn	
1940	Caulfield City			Burnley	
1939	Box Hill			Doncaster	
1938	East Hawthorn			East Kew	
1937	Auburn			Surrey Hills	
1936	Auburn			Hartwell	
1935	Auburn				
1934	Balwyn				
1933	Balwyn				
1932	South Camberwell				
