= Doveton Eagles Football Club =

Doveton Eagles

Names
- Full name: Doveton Eagles Football Netball Club
- Nickname(s): Eagles

Club details
- Founded: 1980; 45 years ago
- Colours
- Competition: Southern Football Netball League
- Ground(s): Power Reserve, Doveton

Uniforms
Home

Other information

The Doveton Eagles Football Club is an Australian rules football club located in the south-eastern suburbs of Melbourne, Victoria. The club is a member of the Southern Football Netball League where the club currently competes in the second division.

== History ==
The Doveton Eagles Football Club was formed in 1980 as St John’s Old Collegians, and competed in the VAFA between 1980 and 1994. The club changed its name to Doveton Eagles in 1990. The seniors contested the F Section grand final against La Trobe University in 1988 and lost, but were promoted to E Section. The side displayed consistently good form in E Section until they changed leagues in 1995.

They had immediate success by winning the 1995 4th division premiership.

Promoted to 2nd division in 1996 they were demoted back to 3rd division in 1999.

They won the senior and reserve premiership in 2013 and was promoted to 2nd division for 2014.

In 2016, the club was relegated back to division 3 before again winning the premiership in 2017 to get back into division 2.

The club lost the 2018 division 2 grand final before winning the 2019 premiership and promotion to division 1.

== Senior premierships ==
- Southern Football League
  - 1995 4th Division
  - 2013 3rd Division
  - 2017 3rd Division
  - 2019 2nd Division
