= Southern Football Netball League =

Australian rules football league

- Formerly: South East Suburban Football League
- Sport: Australian rules football
- Founded: 1963; 63 years ago
- First season: 1963
- CEO: Lee Hartman
- No. of teams: 42
- Most recent champions: D1M: Cheltenham; D2M: Hampton Park; D3M: Hampton; D4M: Hallam; D1W: Endeavour Hills; D2W: Berwick Springs (2025)
- Most titles: East Brighton (11)
- Level on pyramid: 3
- Promotion to: None
- Relegation to: None
- Related competitions: Caulfield-Oakleigh District FL; Eastern Suburban FL; Eastern Suburban Churches FA; Federal FL
- Website: sfnl.com.au

The Southern Football Netball League (SFNL) is an Australian rules football league, based in the south and south eastern suburbs of Melbourne, Victoria, for senior clubs.

== History ==
The South East Suburban Football League was formed in 1963 as a merger of the Caulfield Oakleigh District Football League with the Eastern Suburban Football League after a number of its clubs moved to the Croydon Ferntree Gully FL (now Eastern Football League).

When the Federal Football League folded at the end of 1981, the SESFL had twenty clubs. After the addition of all but one of the Federal clubs for 1982, the league had a 16 team A grade, and a 12 team B grade competition. The league twice tried 3 divisions but the idea was later dropped as clubs left or folded.

In a major project in 1991, the league underwent a major revamp of its administration and opted to employ a full-time administrator and staff to manage the league's affairs. The League's administration along with its member clubs undertook a far-reaching corporate planning programme to map out future directions and objectives. The extra manpower allowed the elevation of League and club standards and the improved marketability of attracting the corporate sponsorship that modern football now required to keep the organisation afloat. Much of this work was completed by early 1992 and it was decided that a new name would be required to flow on from the work already achieved. The Southern Football League was adopted to show that a new professionalism was running football in the southern suburbs.

The league had another major change in 1993, when it absorbed the Eastern Suburban Churches Football Association (ESCFA). The newly merged league began in 1993 with around 50 clubs playing 5 divisions, though this had dropped to 28 clubs in 3 divisions by 2002 due to clubs folding, merging, or moving to other competitions.

In April 1997, the Southern Football Show began on Optus Vision's Localvision channel, covering the weekly news of the league. It moved to Channel 31 Melbourne the following year. This program soon became known as the Southern Footy Show. It later expanded its scope to become the Local Footy Show, covering many Melbourne leagues until 2011.

In the new millennium, the league grew slightly with the addition of the Southern Dragons in 2009, Endeavour Hills in 2011 and Hallam in 2012. The Dragons returned to the VAFA after the 2012 season, but the revival of Carrum Patterson Lakes FC in 2013 after almost 20 years in recess kept the league at 31 clubs.

The 2014 SFL third division seniors grand final was called off after a brawl broke out between players and supporters. The game in which Mount Waverley was taking on Carrum Patterson Lakes. A police spokeswoman said supporters started heckling one of the teams as it left the ground at half-time. A fight broke out and one person was treated in hospital. The game was called off when one of the teams refused to return to the field."

On 11 April 2015, acknowledging the netball part of the competition, the SFL changed its name to the Southern Football Netball League (SFNL). The 2015 season was also a time when the Southern Dragons went into recess.

In 2016 Port Melbourne Colts transferred in from Western Region Football League, and Lyndhurst FC fielded a senior side for the first time.

2017 saw the introduction of women's football.

The inclusion of 3 new clubs - Hampton Park, Frankston Dolphins and Cerberus - enabled the league to have 4 men's divisions for 2018.

In 2022 Cranbourne and Doveton joined the league from the Outer East Football Netball League.

Narre Warren and Berwick Springs entered the SFNL from the Outer East Football Netball League in 2025, while Clyde fielded an Open Grade side for the first time.

St John's moved into Division 4 from the VAFA for the 2026 season.

== Current Clubs (2026 season) ==
=== Locations ===
Locations of the 2025 SFNL clubs. Red indicates clubs in Division 1, orange clubs in Division 2, yellow clubs in division 3, green clubs in Division 4, purple clubs that only field women's sides and blue clubs that play in the open grade only. South Mornington play 16 km south-west of Frankston.

=== Men ===
==== Division 1 ====
Club	Colours	Nickname	Home Ground	Former League	Est.	Years in Comp	SFNL/SESFL Senior Premierships	
Club	Colours	Nickname	Home Ground	Former League	Est.	Years in Comp	Total	Most recent
Bentleigh		Demons	Bentleigh Reserve, Bentleigh	ESCFL, VAFA	1965	1993-1999, 2010-	1	2013
Cheltenham		Rosellas	Cheltenham Reserve, Cheltenham	FFL	1891	1982-	7	2025
Cranbourne		Eagles	Livingston Reserve, Cranbourne East	OEFNL	1889	2022-	1	2022
Dingley		Dingoes	Souter Oval, Dingley Village	CODFL, MPNFL	1958	1963-1976, 2007-	6	2026
Hampton Park		Redbacks	Robert Booth Reserve, Hampton Park	SEFNL	1958	2018-	2	2025
Murrumbeena		Lions	Murrumbeena Park, Murrumbeena	CODFL	1918	1963-	6	2024
Narre Warren		Magpies	Kalora Park, Narre Warren North	OEFNL	1953	2025-	0	-
Port Melbourne Colts		Colts	JL Murphy Reserve, Port Melbourne	WRFL	1957	1975-1980, 2016-	2	2016
Springvale Districts		Demons	Springvale Reserve, Springvale	ESCFA	1959	1993-	2	2018
St Paul's McKinnon		Bulldogs	McKinnon Reserve, Bentleigh	ESCFA	1948	1993-	4	2018

==== Division 2 ====
Club	Colours	Nickname	Home Ground	Former League	Est.	Years in Comp	SFNL/SESFL Senior Premierships	
Club	Colours	Nickname	Home Ground	Former League	Est.	Years in Comp	Total	Most recent
Caulfield Bears		Bears	Koornang Park, Carnegie	–	1993	1993-	1	1994
Chelsea Heights		Demons	Beazley Reserve, Chelsea Heights	SWGFL	1969	1993-	4	2022
Doveton		Doves	Robinson Oval, Doveton	OEFNL	1959	2022-	0	-
East Brighton		Vampires	Hurlingham Park, Brighton East	CODFL	1948	1963-	11	2023
East Malvern (Tooronga-Malvern 1973-2011)		Panthers	D.W. Lucas Oval, Malvern East	VAFA	1964	1973-	6	2026
Frankston Dolphins		Dolphins	Overport Park, Frankston South	–	2017	2018-	1	2024
Hampton (Hampton United 1993-94)		Hammers	Peterson Street Reserve, Highett	ESCFA	1947	1993–2020, 2022-	2	2025
Highett (Highett Districts 1989-96)		Bulldogs	Turner Road Reserve, Highett	–	1929	1989-	4	2018
Keysborough		Burras	Rowley Allan Reserve, Keysborough	MPNFL	1947	2015-	0	-
Mordialloc		Bloodhounds	Ben Kavanagh Reserve, Mordialloc	VFA	1891	1988–	2	2014

==== Division 3 ====
Club	Colours	Nickname	Home Ground	Former League	Est.	Years in Comp	SFNL/SESFL Senior Premierships	
Club	Colours	Nickname	Home Ground	Former League	Est.	Years in Comp	Total	Most recent
Berwick Springs		Titans	Mick Morland Reserve, Clyde North	OEFNL	2019	2025-	0	-
Black Rock		Jets	Donald MacDonald Reserve, Black Rock	ESCFA	1908	1986-1991, 1993-	4	2022
Carrum Patterson Lakes		Lions	Roy Dore Reserve, Carrum	–	2013	2013-	0	-
Endeavour Hills		Falcons	Barry Simon Reserve, Endeavour Hills	–	2011	2011-	1	2023
Hallam		Hawks	Hallam Recreation Reserve, Hallam	OEFNL	2011	2012-2022, 2024-	1	2025
Heatherton		Tunners	Heatherton Recreation Reserve, Heatherton	ESCFA	1913	1993-	4	2026
Lyndhurst		Lightning	Marriott Waters Reserve, Lyndhurst	–	2009	2016-	1	2022
Skye		Bombers	Carrum Downs Recreation Reserve, Carrum Downs	–	2005	2006-	1	2009
South Mornington		Tigers	Citation Oval, Mount Martha	VAFA	2006	2006, 2020-	1	2023
St Kilda City		Saints	Peanut Farm Reserve, St Kilda	NMFL	1946	1965-	9	2010

==== Division 4 ====
Club	Colours	Nickname	Home Ground	Former League	Est.	Years in Comp	SFNL/SESFL Senior Premierships	
Club	Colours	Nickname	Home Ground	Former League	Est.	Years in Comp	Total	Most recent
Ashwood		Magpies	Essex Heights Reserve, Ashwood	–	1985	1985-	2	2001
Clayton		Clays	Meade Reserve, Clayton	FFL, EFNL	1908	1982-1985, 1999-	5	2010
Dandenong West (Dandenong 2003-23)		Westerners	Greaves Reserve, Dandenong	ESCFA	1963	1984-1986, 1993-	1	2026
Doveton Eagles		Eagles	Power Reserve, Doveton	VAFA	1980	1995-	4	2017
Lyndale		Pumas	Barry Powell Reserve, Noble Park North	ESCFA	1961	1987-1989, 1993-	3	2000
Moorabbin (Moorabbin West 1978-2002)		Kangaroos	A.W Oliver Reserve, Hampton East	ESCFA	1978	1982, 1993-	3	2012
Narre South Saints		Saints	Strathaird Reserve, Narre Warren South	VAFA	2005	2020-	0	-
St John's Old Collegians		JOCS	Thomas Carroll Reserve, Doveton	VAFA	1991	2026-	0	-

==== Open Grade Only ====
Club	Colours	Nickname	Home Ground	Former League	Est.	Years in Comp	SFNL/SESFL Senior Premierships	
Club	Colours	Nickname	Home Ground	Former League	Est.	Years in Comp	Total	Most recent
Clyde		Cougars	Clyde Recreation Reserve, Clyde	–	2024	2025-	0	-
Heatherhill		Hawks	Bruce Park, Frankston	–	2023	2023-	0	-
Pakenham thirds		Lions	Toomuc Reserve, Pakenham	–	1892	2026-	0	-
South Yarra		Lions	Leigh Park, Balwyn North	ESCFA	1967	1993-	3	2019

=== Women ===
==== Division 1 ====
Club	Colours	Nickname	Home Ground	Former League	Est.	Years in Comp	SFNL Premierships	
Club	Colours	Nickname	Home Ground	Former League	Est.	Years in Comp	Total	Most recent
Bentleigh		Demons	Bentleigh Reserve, Bentleigh	–	1965	2018-	0	-
Black Rock		Jets	McDonald Reserve, Black Rock	–	1908	2022-	1	2022
Casey Thunder		Thunder	The Hunt Club Reserve, Cranbourne East	–	2019	2021-	1	2023
Endeavour Hills		Falcons	Barry Simon Reserve, Endeavour Hills	VWFL	2011	2018-2022, 2024-	5	2026
Frankston Dolphins		Dolphins	Overport Park, Frankston South	–	2017	2018-	1	2024
Murrumbeena		Lions	Murrumbeena Park, Murrumbeena	–	1918	2018-	1	2017
Narre South Saints		Saints	Strathaird Reserve, Narre Warren South	–	2007	2022-	0	-
South Mornington		Tigers	Citation Oval, Mount Martha	–	2006	2026-	0	-

==== Division 2 ====
Club	Colours	Nickname	Home Ground	Former League	Est.	Years in Comp	SFNL Premierships	
Club	Colours	Nickname	Home Ground	Former League	Est.	Years in Comp	Total	Most recent
Chelsea Heights		Demons	Beazley Reserve, Chelsea Heights	–	1969	2023-	0	-
Clayton		Clays	Meade Reserve, Clayton	–	1908	2018-	1	2018
Endeavour Hills 2		Falcons	Barry Simon Reserve, Endeavour Hills	VWFL	2011	2018-2022, 2024-	5	2026*
Hallam		Hawks	Hallam Recreation Reserve, Hallam	OEFNL	2011	2018-2022, 2024-	0	-
Keysborough		Burras	Rowley Allan Reserve, Keysborough	MPNFL	1947	2026-	0	-
Mordialloc		Bloodhounds	Ben Kavanagh Reserve, Mordialloc	–	1891	2025-	0	-
Murrumbeena 2		Lions	Murrumbeena Park, Murrumbeena	–	1918	2018-	1	2017
Narre Warren		Magpies	Kalora Park, Narre Warren North	OEFNL	1953	2026-	1	2026

*won by Endeavour Hills 1

==== Division 3 ====
Club	Colours	Nickname	Home Ground	Former League	Est.	Years in Comp	SFNL Premierships	
Club	Colours	Nickname	Home Ground	Former League	Est.	Years in Comp	Total	Most recent
Casey Thunder 2		Thunder	The Hunt Club Reserve, Cranbourne East	–	2019	2021-	1	2023
Clyde		Cougars	Clyde Recreation Reserve, Clyde	–	2024	2025-	0	-
Dandenong West		Westerners	Greaves Reserve, Dandenong	–	2025	2025-	0	-
Mordialloc 2		Bloodhounds	Ben Kavanagh Reserve, Mordialloc	–	1891	2025-	0	-
Officer		Kangaroos	Officer Recreation Reserve, Officer	OEFNL	1977	2026-	0	-
St Kilda City		Saints	Peanut Farm Reserve, St Kilda	–	1946	2025-	1	2026

==== In recess ====
Club	Colours	Nickname	Home Ground	Former League	Est.	Years in Comp	SFNL Premierships		Fate
Club	Colours	Nickname	Home Ground	Former League	Est.	Years in Comp	Total	Most recent	Fate
Berwick Springs		Titans	Mick Morland Reserve, Clyde North	OEFNL	2020	2025	1	2025	In recess since 2025 season
East Brighton		Vampires	Hurlingham Park, Brighton East	–	1949	2018-2024	1	2023	In recess since 2024 season
Lyndale		Pumas	Barry Powell Reserve, Noble Park North	–	1961	2018-2025	1	2019	In recess since 2025 season
Skye		Bombers	Carrum Downs Recreation Reserve, Carrum Downs	–	2006	2021-2025	0	-	In recess since 2025 season

== Former Clubs ==
Club	Jumper	Nickname	Home Ground	Former League	Est.	Years in comp	SFNL/SESFL Senior Premierships		Fate
Club	Jumper	Nickname	Home Ground	Former League	Est.	Years in comp	Total	Most recent	Fate
Ashburton		Dragons	Burwood Reserve, Glen Iris	CODFL	1940s	1963-1987	6	1987	Merged with Caulfield following 1987 season to form Caulfield-Ashburton
Ashburton-Chadstone		Toffee Apples	Watson Park, Ashburton	ESCFA	1986	1993-1994	0	-	Folded in 1994
Balwyn		Tigers	Balwyn Park, Balwyn	ESFL	1909	1963-2006	7	2005	Moved to Eastern FNL after 2006 season
Beaumaris		Sharks	Banksia Reserve, Beaumaris	CODFL	1962	1963-1994	2	1977	Moved to VAFA after 1994 season
Bennettswood		Swans	Bennettswood Reserve, Burwood	CODFL, ESFL	1959	1963-1965	0	-	Senior club entered recess, reformed in Eastern Districts FL in 1968
Boronia Park		Bombers	Miller Park, Boronia	VAFA	1990	1994-1999	0	-	Moved to Yarra Valley & Mountain District FL after 1999 season
Box Hill North	(1995)(2001)	Demons	Elgar Park, Box Hill North	ESCFA	1983	1993-2001	0	-	Moved to VAFA after 2001 season
Box Hill Pioneers		Pioneers	Springfield Park, Box Hill North	ESCFA	1954	1993-1997	1	1997	Moved to Eastern FNL after 1997 season, now known as Whitehorse Pioneers
Brooklyn		Bulls	McIvor Reserve, Yarraville	WRFL	1981	2003-2004	0	-	Folded in 2004
Burnley			Burnley Oval, Burnley	CODFL, ESFL	1920s	1963-1965	0	-	Folded in 1965
Burwood		Magpies	Burwood Reserve, Glen Iris	ESFL	1946	1963-1984	3	1979	Merged with Essex Heights to form Ashwood after 1984 season
Burwood United		Woods	Burwood Reserve, Glen Iris	ESCFA	1962	1993	0	-	Merged with Mount Waverley to form Mount Waverley Burwood after 1993 season
Camberwell Power (Box Hill Adelphians 1993-95)		Power	Howard Dawson Reserve, Glen Iris	ESCFA	c.1930s	1993-1996	0	-	Folded in 1996
Canterbury		Cobras	Canterbury Sports Ground, Surrey Hills	ESFL	1881	1963-2008	4	2003	Moved to Eastern FNL after 2008 season
Carnegie		Demons	East Caulfield Reserve, Caulfield East	CODFL, ESCFA	c.1920s	1963-1976, 1980-1990, 1993-1999	2	1975	Recess between 1977-79. Played in Eastern Suburban Churches FA in 1991-92. Folded in 2000
Carrum Downs		Falcons	Carrum Downs Recreation Reserve, Carrum Downs			1993-1999	1	1994	Moved to Mornington Peninsula Nepean FL after 1999 season
Caulfield			Caulfield Park, Caulfield North	YCWFL		1983-1984	0	-	Folded in 1984
Caulfield Amateurs			Caulfield Park, Caulfield North	CODFL	1946	1963-1971	1	1963	Folded in 1972
Caulfield-Ashburton		Dragons	Princes Park, Caulfield South	–	1988	1988	1	1988	Suspended and voted out of league after 1988 season
Caulfield Kontias		Magpies	Caulfield Park, Caulfield North	VAFA	1989	1992	0	-	Folded in 1992
Cerberus		Dogs	McAuliffe Oval, HMAS Cerberus	GL	2003	2004-2010, 2018-2023	1	2018	Merged with South Mornington Thirds side in 2023, folded in 2024
Chadstone			Percy Treyvaud Memorial Park, Malvern East	CODFL	1959	1963-1985	0	-	Folded in 1985
Cheltenham Assumption		Red Roosters	Le Page Park, Cheltenham	ESCFA	1967	1993-1998	1	1996	Folded in 1998
Collingwood Districts			Ramsden Street Oval, Clifton Hill	ESCFA	1986	1993-1995	0	-	Folded in 1996
East Bentleigh			Mackie Road Reserve, Bentleigh East	ESCFA		1993-1995	0	-	Absorbed by St Pauls Bentleigh to form St Pauls East Bentleigh after 1995 season
East Brunswick		Magpies	Fleming Park, Brunswick East	WRFL	1922	1994	0	-	Folded in 1994
East Camberwell			Lynden Park, Camberwell	ESCFA	1946	1993-1994	0	-	Merged with Surrey Hills to form Surrey Park after 1994 season
East Hawthorn		Hawks	St James Park, Hawthorn	NMFL	1931	1975-1987	3	1984	Expelled from league in 1988
East Malvern Amateurs			T.H. King Oval, Glen Iris	VAFA	c.1920s	1965-1984	1	1969	Folded in 1985
East Sandringham		Zebras	RG Chisholm Reserve, Sandringham	CODFL	1948	1963-1975	0	-	Folded in 1975
Edithvale-Aspendale Thirds		Eagles	Regents Park, Aspendale	–	1921	2025	0	-	Moved to MPFNL thirds competition in 2026
Eley Park		Sharks	Eley Park, Blackburn South	ESCFA	1992	1993	0	-	Moved to VAFA after 1993 season
Essex Heights		Tigers	Essex Heights Reserve, Ashwood	–	1970	1970-1982	0	-	Seniors entered recess in 1983, merged with Burwood to form Ashwood after 1984 season
Fairfield Park		Bloods	Fairfield Park Oval, Fairfield	ESCFA	c.1900s	1993-1995	0	-	Moved to Diamond Valley FL following 1995 season
Glen Iris		Gladiators	Eric Raven Reserve, Glen Iris	CODFL	1932	1963-1987	2	1979	Folded in 1987
Glen Iris District			T.H. King Oval, Glen Iris	CODFL	1959	1963-1965	0	-	Folded in 1965
Hawthorn Citizens (Hawthorn Amateurs 1963-68; Hawthorn District 1969-75)			Victoria Road Reserve, Hawthorn East	ESFL	1954	1963-1989	2	1971	Entered recess in 1989, re-formed in VAFA as Hawthorn Amateurs in 1995
Heidelberg Colts		Colts	Olympic Park, Heidelberg West	MNFL	1967	1995	0	-	Folded in 1995
Highett		Bulldogs	Turner Road Reserve, Highett	FFL	1929	1981-1989	0	-	Merged with Highett West following 1989 season to form Highett Districts
Highett West		Kookaburras	Peterson Street Reserve, Highett	–	1975	1975-1989	1	1986	Merged with Highett following 1989 season to form Highett Districts
Highett West Youth Club			Peterson Street Reserve, Highett	CODFL	1950s	1963-1965	0	-	Senior team entered recess in 1966, merged with Highett YCW to form Highett West in 1975
Jolimont			Carter Oval, Burnley	–	1965	1965-1968	0	-	Folded
Kooyong			Righetti Oval, Kooyong	VAFA	1963	1966-1968	2	1967	Merged with Hawthorn Amateurs in 1969 to form Hawthorn District
Lower Plenty		Hawks	Montmorency Park, Montmorency	ESCFA	1961	1993-1994	0	-	Moved to Diamond Valley FL following 1994 season
Mentone		Tigers	Mentone Reserve, Mentone	FFL	1904	1982-1992	0	-	Merged with St Bede's Old Collegians following 1992 season to form St Bede's/Mentone Tigers in VAFA
Middle Park			Oval 10, Albert Park	YCWFL		1983-1984	0	-	Folded in 1984
Moorabbin		Kangas	McKinnon Reserve, Mckinnon	FFL	1979	1982	0	-	Moved to VFA in 1983
Mount Waverley (Mount Waverley Catholics 1993-99)		Mountain Lions	Mayfield Park, Mount Waverley	ESCFA	1974	1993-2018	2	2016	Folded in 2018
Mount Waverley		Blues	Mount Waverley Reserve, Mount Waverley	CODFL	1924	1963-1993	1	1964	Merged with Burwood United to form Mount Waverley Burwood after 1993 season
Mount Waverley Burwood		Blues	Mount Waverley Reserve, Mount Waverley	–	1994	1994-1997	0	-	Merged with Waverley Amateurs following 1997 season to form Waverley Blues in Eastern FNL
Noble Park		Bulls	Pat Wright Senior Oval, Noble Park	FFL	1918	1963, 1982-1999	9	1997	Moved to Eastern FNL after 1999 season
North Blackburn		Eagles	Koonung Park, Blackburn North	ESCFA	1967	1993-1995	0	-	Folded in 1996
North Kew	(1963-?)(?-2006)	Bears	Stradbroke Park, Kew East	ESFL	1932	1963-2006	1	1999	Merged with Kew Amateurs following 2006 season to form Kew Bears in VAFA
Oakleigh District		Districts	Princes Highway Reserve, Oakleigh East	FFL	1915	1963, 1982-2021	1	2015	Moved to Eastern FNL after 2021 season
Parkdale		Seagulls	Gerry Green Reserve, Parkdale	FFL	1934	1982-2003	3	1995	Merged with Mentone Amateurs following 2003 season to form Parkdale Vultures in VAFA
Parkmore		Pirates	Frederick Wachter Reserve, Keysborough	–	2004	2005-2007	1	2006	Folded in 2007
Pearcedale Thirds		Panthers	Pearcedale Recreation Reserve, Pearcedale	–	1898	2025	0	-	Moved to MPFNL thirds competition in 2026
R.A.A.F Cadets			Highfield Park, Camberwell	CODFL	1962	1963, 1966-1969	0	-	Folded in 1969
Richmond Rosellas		Rosellas	Kevin Bartlett Reserve, Burnley	ESCFA	1978	1994-1995	0	-	Folded in 1995
Sandown Cobras (Sandown 1963-86, Southern Cobras 2002-04)		Cobras	Edinburgh Reserve, Springvale	CODFL, EFNL	1962	1963-1976, 2002-2023	2	1972	Moved to Eastern Districts FL after 1976 season. Folded after 2023 season
Southern Dragons		Dragons	Keeley Park, Clayton South	VAFA	2007	2009-2012, 2015	1	2011	Folded after round 9, 2015
South Melbourne Districts		Bloods	Lindsay Hassett Oval, Albert Park	NMFL	1912	1974-1999	2	1983	Moved to VAFA after 1999 season
South Murrumbeena			Packer Park, Carnegie	CODFL	1958	1963-1965	0	-	Folded in 1965
St Bede's Old Collegians		Bedas	Beda Park, Mordialloc	–	1966	1966-1969	1	1968	Moved to VAFA after 1969 season
Surrey Park		Panthers	Surrey Park, Box Hill	–	1994	1995-2001	0	-	Moved to Eastern FNL after 2001 season
Syndal-Tally Ho		Synners	Jordan Reserve, Chadstone	ESCFA	1983	1993-1996	1	1994	Moved to VAFA after 1996 season
Tooronga			Johnson Oval, Tooronga Park, Malvern	ESFL	1919	1963	0	-	Merged with Malvern to form Tooronga-Malvern in the VAFA in 1964

== Premiers ==
=== Men's seniors ===
Southern Football Netball League
Year	Division 1	Division 2	Division 3	Division 4	Division 5
2026	Dingley	East Malvern	Heatherton	Dandenong West	4 divisions (2018−)
2025	Cheltenham	Hampton Park	Hampton	Hallam	4 divisions (2018−)
2024	Cheltenham	Murrumbeena	Frankston Dolphins	Hampton	4 divisions (2018−)
2023	Cheltenham	East Brighton	Endeavour Hills	South Mornington	4 divisions (2018−)
2022	Cranbourne	Chelsea Heights	Black Rock	Lyndhurst	4 divisions (2018−)
2021	(Season abandoned due to COVID-19)				4 divisions (2018−)
2020	(No competition due to COVID-19)				4 divisions (2018−)
2019	Dingley	Doveton Eagles	Hampton Park	South Yarra	4 divisions (2018−)
2018	St Paul's	Highett	Springvale Districts	Cerberus	4 divisions (2018−)
2017	Dingley	Chelsea Heights	Doveton Eagles	3 divisions (1999−2017)	
2016	Dingley	Port Melbourne Colts	Mount Waverley	3 divisions (1999−2017)	
2015	Dingley	Oakleigh District	Black Rock	3 divisions (1999−2017)	
2014	East Brighton	Mordialloc	Match abandoned	3 divisions (1999−2017)	
2013	St Paul's	Bentleigh	Doveton Eagles	3 divisions (1999−2017)	
2012	East Brighton	East Malvern	Moorabbin	3 divisions (1999−2017)	
2011	St Paul's	Highett	Southern Dragons	3 divisions (1999−2017)	
2010	St Kilda City	Clayton	Hampton	3 divisions (1999−2017)	
2009	St Kilda City	Heatherton	Skye	3 divisions (1999−2017)	
2008	St Paul's	Dingley	South Yarra	3 divisions (1999−2017)	
2007	St Kilda City	Springvale District	Black Rock	3 divisions (1999−2017)	
2006	Clayton	Heatherton	Parkmore	3 divisions (1999−2017)	
2005	Balwyn	St Kilda City	Moorabbin	3 divisions (1999−2017)	
2004	East Brighton	Highett	Black Rock	3 divisions (1999−2017)	
2003	Balwyn	Murrumbeena	Canterbury	3 divisions (1999−2017)	
2002	St Kilda City	East Brighton	Hampton	3 divisions (1999−2017)	
2001	Clayton	Ashwood	Tooronga Malvern	3 divisions (1999−2017)	
2000	Balwyn	Chelsea Heights	Lyndale	3 divisions (1999−2017)	
1999	Balwyn	Mordialloc	North Kew	3 divisions (1999−2017)	
1998	Balwyn	St Kilda City	Heatherton	Mount Waverley Catholics	4 divisions (1996−1998)
1997	Noble Park	Balwyn	Box Hill Pioneers	Lyndale	4 divisions (1996−1998)
1996	Noble Park	Ashwood	Highett	Cheltenham Assumption	4 divisions (1996−1998)
1995	Parkdale	Cheltenham	Chelsea Heights	Doveton Eagles	Lyndale
1994	Noble Park	Caulfield	St Kilda City	Syndal-Tally Ho	Carrum Downs
1993	East Brighton	Cheltenham	Murrumbeena	South Yarra	Moorabbin West
1992	Noble Park	Cheltenham	2 divisions (1992)		
South East Suburban Football League
Year	Division 1	Division 2	Division 3		
1991	East Brighton	Canterbury	2 divisions (1987−1991)		
1990	Noble Park	Tooronga-Malvern	2 divisions (1987−1991)		
1989	Balwyn	Parkdale	2 divisions (1987−1991)		
1988	Caulfield-Ashburton	East Brighton	2 divisions (1987−1991)		
1987	Noble Park	Ashburton	2 divisions (1987−1991)		
1986	Noble Park	Highett West	Murrumbeena	3 divisions (1986)	
1985	Noble Park	Tooronga-Malvern	2 divisions (1985)		
1984	Clayton	Parkdale	East Hawthorn	3 divisions (1983-1984)	
1983	Noble Park	South Melbourne Districts	Hawthorn Citizens	3 divisions (1983-1984)	
1982	Clayton	East Hawthorn	2 divisions (1963−1982)		
1981	Ashburton	East Hawthorn	2 divisions (1963−1982)		
1980	Ashburton	St Kilda City	2 divisions (1963−1982)		
1979	Burwood	Glen Iris	2 divisions (1963−1982)		
1978	Ashburton	Tooronga-Malvern	2 divisions (1963−1982)		
1977	Ashburton	Beaumaris	2 divisions (1963−1982)		
1976	East Brighton	South Melbourne Districts	2 divisions (1963−1982)		
1975	Carnegie	Port Colts	2 divisions (1963−1982)		
1974	Murrumbeena	Carnegie	2 divisions (1963−1982)		
1973	East Brighton	Ashburton	2 divisions (1963−1982)		
1972	Canterbury	Sandown	2 divisions (1963−1982)		
1971	Hawthorn District	St Kilda City	2 divisions (1963−1982)		
1970	Burwood	Hawthorn District	2 divisions (1963−1982)		
1969	Canterbury	East Malvern	2 divisions (1963−1982)		
1968	Burwood	St Bede's Old Collegians	2 divisions (1963−1982)		
1967	Kooyong	Sandown	2 divisions (1963−1982)		
1966	East Brighton	Kooyong	2 divisions (1963−1982)		
1965	Glen Iris	Beaumaris	2 divisions (1963−1982)		
1964	Mount Waverley	Hawthorn Amateurs	2 divisions (1963−1982)		
1963	Murrumbeena	Caulfield	2 divisions (1963−1982)		

=== Women's seniors ===
Year	Division 1	Division 2	Division 3
2026	Endeavour Hills	Narre Warren	St Kilda City
2025	Endeavour Hills	Berwick Springs	2 divisions (2018-25)
2024	Endeavour Hills	Frankston Dolphins	2 divisions (2018-25)
2023	Casey Thunder	East Brighton	2 divisions (2018-25)
2022	Endeavour Hills	Black Rock	2 divisions (2018-25)
2021	(Season abandoned due to COVID-19)		2 divisions (2018-25)
2020	(No competition due to COVID-19)		2 divisions (2018-25)
2019	Endeavour Hills	Lyndale	2 divisions (2018-25)
2018	Murrumbeena	Clayton	2 divisions (2018-25)
2017	Murrumbeena	1 division (2017)	2 divisions (2018-25)
