= Don Henwood =

Australian rules footballer

Personal information
- Full name: Don Henwood
- Born: 30 March 1957 (age 69)
- Original team: Doveton
- Height: 180 cm (5 ft 11 in)
- Weight: 80 kg (176 lb)

Playing career^{1}
| Years | Club | Games (Goals) |
| 1978 | Footscray | 2 (0) |
- ^{1} Playing statistics correct to the end of 1978.

Don Henwood (born 30 March 1957) is a former Australian rules footballer who played with Footscray in the Victorian Football League (VFL).
