= Ashwood Football Club =

Ashwood

Names
- Full name: Ashwood Sports Club
- Nickname(s): Magpies

Club details
- Founded: 1985; 40 years ago
- Colours
- Competition: Southern Football Netball League
- Ground(s): Essex Heights Reserve, Mount Waverley

Uniforms
Home

Other information
- Official website: ashwoodfc.com.au

The Ashwood Sports Club is a sports club located in the south-eastern suburbs of Melbourne, Victoria. The club is mostly known for its Australian rules football team, which currently plays in the Division 3 of Southern Football Netball League.

Apart from football, other sports practiced at Ashwood are basketball, cricket and netball.

== Overview ==
Ashwood Football Club was formed in 1985 by means of a merger between Burwood and Essex Heights Football Clubs.

Ashwood play their home games at Essex Heights Reserve, which is on the border of Ashwood and Mount Waverley in Melbourne, Victoria.

The club currently has a senior and reserves teams as well as Juniors boys and Girl teams .

== Senior premierships ==
- Southern Football League (2): 1996, 2001
