= John Walker (Australian footballer) =

Australian rules footballer

Personal information
- Full name: John Walker
- Born: 13 July 1951 (age 75)
- Original team: Dandenong
- Height: 185 cm (6 ft 1 in)
- Weight: 87 kg (192 lb)

Playing career^{1}
Years	Club	Games (Goals)
1972	Collingwood	1 (0)
- ^{1} Playing statistics correct to the end of 1972.

John Walker (born 13 July 1951) is a former Australian rules footballer who played with Collingwood in the Victorian Football League (VFL).
