= Hallam Football Club =

Hallam

Names
- Full name: Hallam Football Club
- Nickname(s): Hawks

Club details
- Founded: 2012; 13 years ago
- Colours
- Competition: Southern Football Netball League
- Coach: Tom Dalton
- Ground(s): Hallam Recreation Reserve, Hallam

Uniforms
Home

The Hallam Football Club is an Australian rules football club located in the Melbourne suburb of Hallam which participates in the Southern Football Netball League.

== History ==
The club was established in 2012, as a result of joining forces of the Hallam Junior Football Club and the Hallam Superules Football Club, and was accepted into the Southern Football Netball League. The club commenced in Division Three and won three games in its first year and two games in its second. A first finals appearance was made in 2016, with preliminary final appearances in 2017 and 2022 being the club's best efforts to date.

An earlier club serving the area was the Narre Hallam Football Club, founded in 1953, which is based in Narre Warren and in 1989 renamed the Narre Warren Football Club.

== Club Records ==
| Highest Score | 34.21 (225) v Dandenong, Round 7, 2017, Hallam Recreation Reserve |
| Lowest Score | 1.2 (8) v Hampton Park, Round 1, 2018, Booth Reserve |
| Greatest Winning Margin | 198 points v Dandenong, Round 7, 2017, Hallam Recreation Reserve |
| Greatest Losing Margin | 204 points v Springvale Districts, Round 4, 2018, Hallam Recreation Reserve |
| Lowest Winning Score | 6.6 (42) v Cerberus 3.11 (29), Round 5, 2021, McAuliffe Reserve |
| Highest Losing Score | 14.16 (100) v Black Rock 17.13 (115), Round 18, 2013, MacDonald Reserve |
