= Hampton Park Football Club =

Names
- Full name: Hampton Park Football Club
- Nickname(s): Redbacks

2019 season
- After finals: Premiers
- Leading goalkicker: Peter Dye
- Best and fairest: Shannon Henwood

Club details
- Founded: 1958; 67 years ago
- Colours: Black, Red
- Competition: Southern FNL
- President: Craig Seers
- Coach: Nathan Wilson
- Captain(s): Cory Phillips
- Premierships: 1959, 1960, 1963, 1967, 1968, 1997, 1998, 2019
- Ground(s): Robert Booth Reserve

The Hampton Park Football Club is an Australian rules football club which plays in the Southern FL Division 2.

== History ==
Founding member of the South East Football Netball League they stayed three years before transferring to the Southern FNL in 2018. The Redbacks played finals in their first season of SFNL, before winning the 2019 Division 3 premiership, defeating Clayton by 54 points.

=== Premierships ===
- South West Gippsland FL
  - 1959, 1960, 1963, 1967, 1968,
- Mornington Peninsula Nepean FL - Northern Division
  - 1997, 1998
- Southern Football Netball League
  - Division 3 - 2019
