= Chelsea Heights Football Club =

Chelsea Heights

Names
- Full name: Chelsea Heights Football Netball Club
- Nickname(s): Demons, Heighters

Club details
- Founded: 1969; 57 years ago
- Colours
- Competition: Southern Football Netball League
- President: Kellie Peryman
- Coach: Nathan Robinson
- Captain: Rob MacPherson
- Premierships: (4): 1995, 2000, 2017, 2022
- Ground: Beazley Reserve

Uniforms
Home

Other information
- Official website: chelseaheightsfnc.com.au

The Chelsea Heights Football Netball Club is an Australian rules football and netball club located in the bayside suburbs of Melbourne, Victoria, Australia. The club currently participates in the Division 2 of Southern Football Netball League, based in the south and south eastern suburbs of Melbourne.

== History ==
Chelsea Heights was established in 1969. The club first competed in the South West Gippsland Football League from 1973 to 1992. Their best result was making the Grand Final in 1978 only to lose to Berwick by 53 points.

In 1993 the club decided to move to the newly reformatted the Southern Football League. The club competed in 3rd Division until it won the flag in 1995. Promoted to 2nd Division in 1996 the club went on to win the 2000 premiership, thus entitling them to be promoted to 1st Division. The club's best result in first division is Runners up in the 2009,2010 & 2012 Grand finals. The club was relegated from Division 1 in 2015, returning to Division 2 for the first time since the 2000 grand final win.

Chelsea Heights has seen many great players in the club's history, including Frankston VFL champion Ash Roberts, Paul Smit, Phil Matheson, Ryan Flack, Travis Coote along with ex-AFL players Darren Walsh, Jayden Attard, Scott Crow, Glenn Nugent & Travis Johnstone.

Based at Beazley Reserve, the club has been very well served by two terrific stalwarts Neil Lockhart & Ben Bradley. The social rooms are named after Lockhart for all his terrific work across many years.

The record for goals in a game by an individual at CHFNC is 18, held by John Syme & Jackson Fry.

League best and fairest winners include 1999 & 2000 - David Cross (div 2) 2004 - Scott Crow (div 1), 2007 - Paul Wineberg (div 1), 2010 - Ryan Flack (div 1), 2016 - Jordan Perryman (div 2) and 2022 - Luke Clark (div 2).

== Senior Premierships ==
- Southern Football League (4):
  - Division 3 (1): 1995
  - Division 2 (3): 2000, 2017, 2022
