= Keysborough Football Club =

Australian football club

Full name	Keysborough Football Netball Club
Emblem	The Burras
Colours	blue, red and white
Founded	1947
League	Southern Football League
Premierships	1948, 1962, 1964, 1965, 1976
Official website	Official website

The Keysborough Football Netball Club is a semi-professional Australian rules football club in the southern suburbs of Melbourne. The club participates in the Southern Football Netball League.

== History ==
Formed in 1947, the Burras joined the Dandenong District 'B' grade competition. In 1948 the club won its first premiership with a victory over Officer, 15.13 103 to 12.12 84. Promoted into 'A' grade in 1950 the club stayed there until the DDFL folded at the end of 1953. In 1954 the club joined the Croydon Ferntree Gully FL and stay for four seasons. In 1958 The club transferred to the South West Gippsland FL, it took only four years before premiership glory returned to the club. The club saluted again in 1964 and 1965 and again later in 1976.

When the clubs in the Casey Cardinia Division decided in 2015 to break away from the Mornington Nepean FL, Keysborough decide to join the Southern Football Netball League instead. It was accepted and commenced in 2nd Division.

== Senior Premierships ==
- Dandenong District Football League B grade.
  - 1948
- South West Gippsland Football League
  - 1962, 1964, 1965, 1976.

== VFL/AFL players ==
- Reg Kent - Western Bulldogs
- Leigh Capsalis - St Kilda
- Chris Bryan - Collingwood, Carlton
- Peter Ryan - South Melbourne
