= Sandown Cobras Football Club =

Sandown Cobras

Names
- Full name: Sandown Cobras Football Netball Club
- Nickname: Cobras

Club details
- Founded: 1962; 64 years ago
- Colours
- Competition: Southern Football Netball League
- Ground: Edinbourgh Reserve, Springvale, Victoria

Uniforms
Home

Other information
- Official website: sandowncobrasfc.com.au

The Sandown Cobras Football Netball Club is an Australian rules football and netball club located in Springvale, Victoria. Sandown currently plays in the Southern Football Netball League.

== History ==
The "Sandown Football Club" was formed in 1961 when local identities had a meeting at 44 Grace St, North Springvale at the home of Alby Schmidt. Present at that meeting with Alby were Alec Felton, Fred Esdaile (who became its first president), Carlie Coates, Alan Smith, Ron Currie, Alan Stevens, David Leatham, Laurie Matheson, Jack Milnes and Roger Page. They decided that a local team was needed by the youth of the area and made an application to the Caulfield & Oakleigh Football League for the admission of a team for 1962.

Managed by Fred Dinnie, Sandown won its first senior premiership (Division 2) in 1967. The premiership team as selected, was: B: Wal Foley, Peter Camilleri, Ron Sheedy; HB: Robin Crewther, Rex Atkinson, Merv Williams; C: Cliff Atkinson, Ross Tucker, Vic Faoro; HF: Trevor Schmidt, Ken Wells, Rick Allsop; F: Harry Gunther, Bert Zelinskis, John Pascoe; Foll: Ross Manniche, Grant McAndlish, Brenden Milnes; Inter: Don Clarke, Graeme Dawes

Coached by Alan Roberts, Sandown won its second premiership title in 1972.

The club merged with South Waverley Juniors FC in 1984, therefore it renamed to "South Waverley–Sandown FC". The club played the Eastern District Football League's Division 4 Grand Final v. Lillydale in 1987, winning 18.15 (123) – 14.7 (91).

In 1996 the club changed its name to "South Waverley–Sandown Southern Cobras FC", using the nickname Cobras for the first time as an official name. South Waverley–Sandown won the 1997 EDFL Grand Final v. the Waverley Amateurs by 16.14 (110) – 8.15 (63). The club went into recess in 1999, returning to the Southern league in 2001.

The last name changing came in 2005 when the club identified itself as "Sandown Cobras FC".

Local legend, Jesse Tregea, was a prominent icon in the Cobra family. His football prowess can only be match by his ability to simp over any woman who takes a small interest in him. But within all his accomplishments there's a glaring red mark. With the game on the line in finals, a failed tackle letting an opposition player get loose and kicking the winning goal and thus be known as the reason why Cobras ressies never made a grand final and he's never pulled on the boots since. But don't let that deter you from the great specimen of a man 'JT' is, he is a good friend.

== Senior Premierships ==
- Southern Football League:
  - Second Division (2): 1967, 1972
