= Mount Waverley Football Club =

Association football club in Melbourne, Victoria, Australia

Mount Waverley
- Full name: Mount Waverley Football & Netball Club
- Nickname: Mountain Lions
- Founded: 1974
- League: Southern Football League
- Colours: green jumper with yellow graphics
- Website: Official website

The Mount Waverley Football & Netball Club is a semi-professional Australian rules football club in the south eastern suburbs of Melbourne. The club participates in the Southern Football Netball League.

== History ==
In 1974 the Mount Waverley Catholic Football Club first entered a team in the YCWNFA football competition. They competed in the c south section and made the Preliminary final losing to glen Waverley by 10 points. The following year the club had transferred to the Eastern Suburban Churches FA and debuted in 'E' Grade.

In 1978 saw the first success for the young club as they won the 'D' grade premiership by 27 points defeating Chadstone Salesian. Automatically promoted to 'C' grade the following year they team again made the Grand Final only to be defeated by St Andrews Presbyterians by 12 points. As by association rules, both grand finalists get promoted, the Mountain Lions survived six seasons in 'B' grade before being relegated down to 'C' grade again. They were relegated again in 1990 to the lowest level of the ESCFA.

In 1993 the Southern FL absorbed the Eastern Suburbs Churches Football Association. The newly merged league began with around 50 clubs playing 5 divisions, though this had dropped to 28 clubs in 3 divisions by 2002 due to clubs folding, merging, or moving to other competitions.

In 2000 the club shortened its name by dropping 'Catholic' from its title.

The 2014 SFL third division seniors grand final was called off after a brawl broke out between players and supporters. The game in which Mount Waverley was taking on Carrum Patterson Lakes. A police spokeswoman said supporters started heckling one of the teams as it left the ground at half-time. A fight broke out and one person was treated in hospital. The game was called off when one of the teams refused to return to the field." There was a lot of conjecture and frustration with this result, as the SFNL by-laws state that Mount Waverley FNC should've been awarded the Premiership as they were leading after the half-time siren had sounded. Despite independent reports by both the Victorian Police and AFL Victoria Integrity Unit Officer stating Mount Waverley FNC were not at fault, the Premiership was not awarded to either clubs. The talk & rumours is that the SFNL considered Carrum-Pattersons Lakes FC a priority club in a growth area that would be important to the further expansion of the SFNL.

In 2016 The Mountain Lions had a very successful season, with both their Senior & Reserves Football Teams winning the premiership in undefeated seasons. Their Netball Team also won their Championship as well. Also, their Full-Forward James Gough, winning the league goal-kicking with 118 goals & Centre-half forward Luke Galle coming 2nd in the league on 82 goals for the season.

In 2019 the club went into recess due to personnel and financial issues.

== Senior Grand Finals/Premierships ==
- Eastern Suburban Churches Football Association
  - 'D' Grade 1978
- Southern Football League
  - 4th Division (1): 1998
  - 3rd Division (2): 2007 (runners up)
  - 3rd Division (2): 2009 (runners up)
  - 3rd Division (2): 2010 (runners up)
  - 3rd Division (2): 2011 (runners up)
  - 3rd Division (2): 2012 (runners up)
  - 3rd Division (1*): 2014 (Grand Final called off)
  - 3rd Division (2): 2015 (runners up)
  - 3rd Division (1): 2016

== Reserves Grand Finals/Premierships ==
- Southern Football League
  - 3rd Division (2): 2009 (runners up)
  - 3rd Division (1): 2010
  - 3rd Division (1): 2011
  - 3rd Division (1): 2012
  - 3rd Division (1): 2016

== Original Mt Waverley Football Club (1924-1993) ==
Formed in 1924, the Mt Waverley Football Club played in the Federal League, then the Oakleigh Caulfield District Football League, and then the South East Suburban Football League. The club won a premiership in 1964. As the SESFL grew, Mt Waverley played all its games in its top division. The SESFL became the Southern League and MWFC continued in First Division until 1993 when it merged with the Burwood Football Club to form the Mt Waverley Burwood Football Club. The new club went on to merge with the Waverley Football Club in 1998 to form the Waverley Blues who play in the Eastern Football League.
