= Heatherton Football Club =

Australian Rules Football and Netball Club

Heatherton

Names
- Full name: Heatherton Football Netball Club
- Nickname(s): Tunners

Club details
- Founded: 1913; 112 years ago
- Colours
- Competition: Southern Football Netball League
- Premierships: (12): 1938, 1957, 1964, 1965, 1968, 1974, 1977, 1985, 1992, 1998, 2006, 2009

Uniforms
Home

Other information
- Official website: heathertonfc.com.au

The Heatherton Football Netball Club is an Australian rules football and netball club located in the southern suburbs of Melbourne. The club participates in The Southern Football Netball League, based in the south and south eastern suburbs of Melbourne, Victoria.

== History ==
The club was established in 1913. It was intermittently in the Federal Association before moving to the Berwick FA from 1929 to 1934 and then onto the Caulfield-Oakleigh FL. Heatherton stayed in that competition until 1941 when it disbanded for the duration of World War II.

Reforming in 1946 the club was again in the Federal League. Heatherton had embraced commercialism and changed its name to Freighters Football Club for seasons 1951 and 1952, making their first grand final in 1951 only to be defeated by Mordialloc. After 1952 the club went into recess.

The club re-appeared in 1974 and contested what would be the final season of the CYMS competition, and it won its first premiership defeating Elwood. From 1975 until 1989 the club played in the Victorian Amateur Football Association Leaving the Amateurs the club moved to ESCFA in 1990 and played in its C grade competition. In 1993 the association was absorbed in the Southern Football League.

== Senior Premierships ==
- Catholic Young Mens Society Football Association (1): 1974
- Victorian Amateur Football Association (2): 1977, 1985
- Eastern Suburban Churches Football Association (1): 1992 (C grade)
- Southern Football League
  - Division 2 (2): 2006, 2009
  - Division 3 (1): 1998
