= Oakleigh District Football Club =

- Full name: Oakleigh District Football Netball Cricket Club
- Nickname: The Districts
- Short name: ODFNC
- Founded: 1950
- League: Eastern Football Netball League
- Colours: Black and white sash
- Premierships: 4 (1953, 1957, 1958 & 2015)
- Website: www.oakleighdistrictfnc.com.au

The Oakleigh District Football Netball Club is a semi-professional Australian rules football club in the southern suburbs of Melbourne. The club currently participates in Division 3 of the Eastern Football Netball League.

== History ==
Late in 1949 a meeting was held in Oakleigh Mechanics Institute Hall in Drummond Street Oakleigh to solve the problem of having no open age side to for all mature players to continue on their careers. The only open age side in Oakleigh area besides the Oakleigh (VFA) club was Oakleigh United but they had just disbanded. The club had left 50 pounds to any club starting up an open age side.

Oakleigh District Football Club was formed and accepted into the Caulfield-Oakleigh District Football League. Oakleigh (VFA) was asked for assistance but they gave none. The club decided to use the old United jumpers (Black and White stripes)

It wasn't long before the Districts had success as they won the 1953, 1957 and 1958 premierships.

After founding the South East Suburban Football League in 1963, the club transferred to the Federal Football League in 1964. The club had to change its jumper as it clashed with Clayton; not wanting to change its colours, the club adopted a black jumper with a white sash.

The club stayed in the league until it disbanded in 1981. They with the rest of the Federal clubs transferred into the South East Suburban FL.

By the time of their breakthrough premier in 2015 the club had lost 12 grand finals. In 2015, the team had not won the final for sixty years, and was challenged for the premiership by Murrumbeena, the team Oakleigh had beaten in 1958. According to the team president, Oakleigh played to honor the memory of former player Phil Wilson. Wilson, who had a long association with the team and was known for his sportsmanship, had a brain tumor. He died in March 2015. Oakleigh won the Southern Football League Division Two Senior Premiership by 62 points, and was advanced to Division 1 status. The final score of the game was 104 to 44.

The club transferred to the Eastern Football League in 2022 because it felt the administration of the Southern FNL would not act on the club's concerns about junior development in the area.

== Senior premierships ==
- Caulfield Oakleigh Football League
  - 1953, 1957, 1958
- Southern Football League
  - 2nd Division (1): 2015
  - Under 19's (1): 2017

== VFL/AFL players ==
- Leon Higgins
- David Rhys-Jones
- Warwick Capper
- Laurie Fowler
- Dean Anderson
- Michael Wright
- Stephen Wright

David Winbanks
