= Dingley Football Club =

Dingley Football and Netball Club

Names
- Full name: Dingley Football and Netball Club
- Nickname: Dingoes

Club details
- Founded: 1958; 68 years ago
- Colours: Black Red Gold
- Competition: Southern Football Netball League
- President: Clint Brooks
- Premierships: (7): 1994, 2008, 2015, 2016, 2017, 2019, 2026

Uniforms
Home

Other information
- Official website: dingleyfc.com.au

The Dingley Football and Netball Club is an Australian rules football and netball club located in the southern suburbs of Melbourne. The football teams participates in the Southern Football Netball League, based in the south and south eastern suburbs of Melbourne, Victoria.

== History ==
The club was established in 1958 but waited until the following year to join the Caulfield-Oakleigh Football League. When the league merged with the Eastern Suburban FL to form the South East Suburban FL, the club was allocated to B Grade.

Dingley moved to the South West Gippsland Football League from 1977 to 1994. They made the Grand Final in 1994 and defeated Cranbourne by 24 points.

1995 saw the SWGFL get absorbed into the Mornington Peninsula Nepean FL and Dingley continued in this competition until the end of 2006. The club had limited success, only making the finals on one occasion.

In 2007 the club decided to move to the Southern Football League. The club competed in 2nd Division and won the flag in 2008. Dingley has competed in 1st Division since 2009.

In 2011, the club signed ex-AFL players Shane Morwood and Darren Kappler as senior and reserve coaches respectively and started on a journey of sustained success, which resulted in the delivery of a '3-Peat' of Division 1 senior premierships in 2015/2016/2017.

The Dingoes introduced netball in 2012 and changed their name officially to the Dingley Football Netball Club at their 2015 AGM. Since 2012, the Dingoes have played in every SFNL Division 1 Netball Grand Final, securing the 2013/2014/2015 3-Peat. The club's thirds side (also introduced in 2012) also secured 3-Peat titles over this same period.

The club's reserves have been hugely successful in recent years, claiming successive minor premierships every year since 2011 and securing the 2011, 2014 and 2015 premierships from 6 Grand Final appearances.

== Premierships ==
=== Seniors ===
- South West Gippsland Football League (1): 1994
- Southern Football League (6): 2008 (Division 2), 2015 (Division 1), 2016 (Division 1), 2017 (Division 1), 2019 (Division 1), 2026 (Division 1)

=== Reserves ===
- Southern Football League (7): 2011, 2014, 2015, 2019, 2022, 2024, 2026

=== Thirds ===
- Southern Football League (4): 2013, 2014, 2015, 2025

=== Under 19s ===
- Southern Football League (1): 2018
