= Point Cook Football Club =

Amateur Australian rules football club

Names
- Full name: Point Cook Football Club
- Nickname: Bulldogs

2026 season
- After finals: 10th
- Home-and-away season: 10th
- Leading goalkicker: Zayne Galea (27)
- Best and fairest: Billy Kolyniuk

Club details
- Founded: 2003; 23 years ago (entered juniors 2004, seniors 2010)
- Colours: Red White Blue
- Competition: Western Football Netball League Seniors Div. 1
- President: David Rouvray
- Coach: Saade Ghazi
- Captain(s): Lochlan Allen; Billy Kolyniuk; Shaun Wyatt
- Premierships: 29; Senior (1): 2018; Netball (3): 2018; 2023; 2024; Under 18 (2): 2011; 2026; Junior (23): 2008; 2011; 2014 (2); 2016 (2); 2017 (3); 2018 (2); 2019 (3); 2022; 2023; 2024; 2025 (3); 2026 (3)
- Ground: Saltwater Reserve
- Former grounds: Carranballac College (2004)
- Altona Green Primary School (2005 - 2010)
- Dunnings Road Oval (2007 - 2012)
- Alamanda Reserve (2011 - 2012))
- Training ground: Saltwater Reserve

Other information
- Official website: pointcookfc.com.au
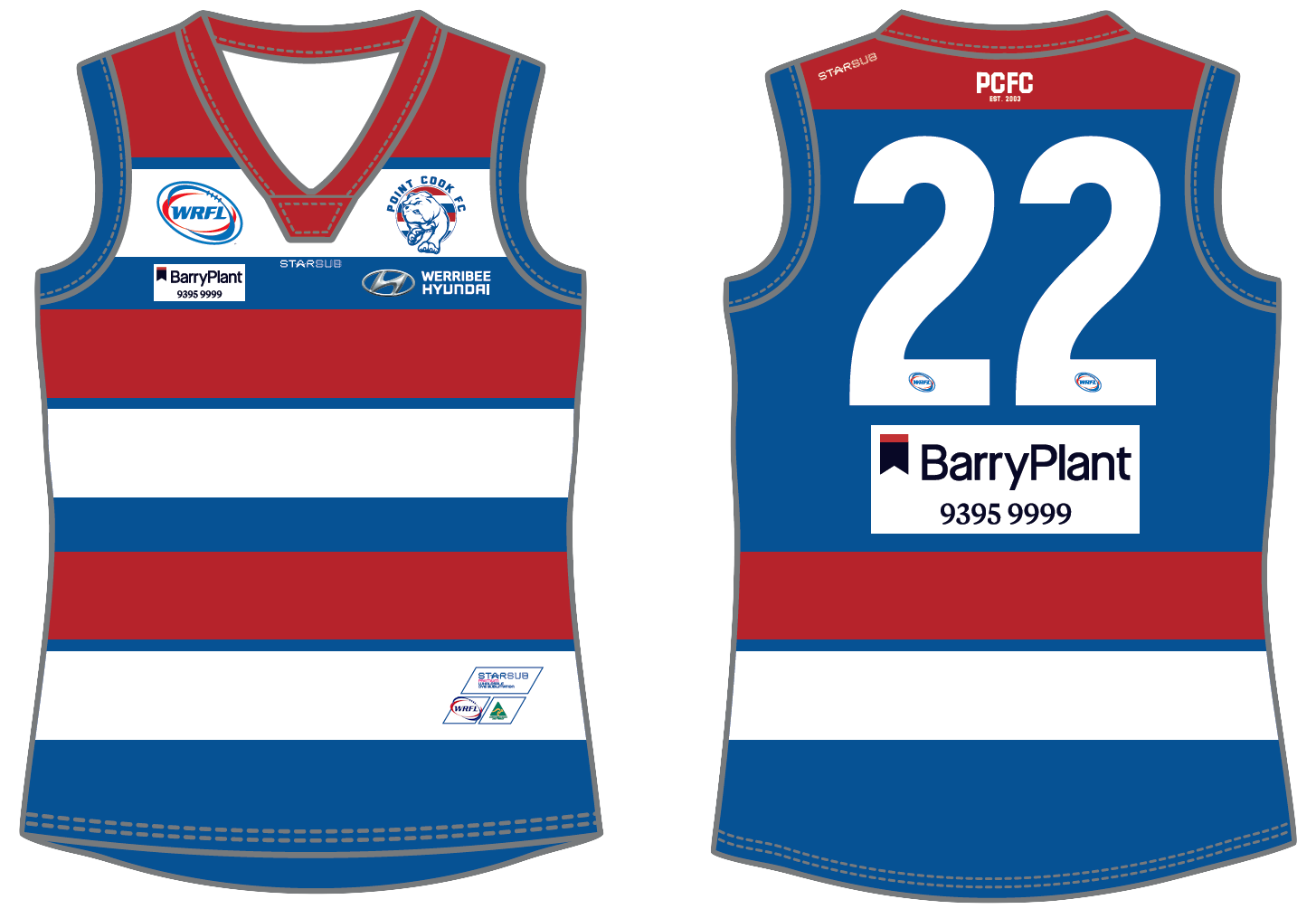
- Guernsey:

The Point Cook Football Club, nicknamed the Bulldogs, is an Amateur Australian rules football club, based in the Melbourne suburb of Point Cook, playing in the Western Region Football League (WRFL). The club was founded in 2003 as a junior club and expanded to senior teams in 2010. Point Cook's home ground is Saltwater Reserve.

== History ==
The Point Cook Football Club was established in October 2003 as an Australian Rules Junior Football Club, catering for the needs of Junior footballers in the Point Cook and surrounding areas. 2004 was the first year of football competing in the Western Region Football League (WRFL).

Due to the growth of the members and the need for Senior football in the area, the Point Cook Football Club entered Senior and Reserve teams in the Victorian Amateur Football Association (VAFA) in season 2010.

In 2014 the Point Cook Football Club fielded their very first 'Youth Girls' team with players aged between 13 – 18 competing against other girls the same age. In 2015 the Point Cook Football Club fielded their first 'Superules' team with players aged over 35 competing against other teams in the AFL Masters, Victorian Metropolitan League

Following a Special Meeting of the members and a vote the club moved its Senior & Reserve Sides from the Victorian Amateur Football Association (VAFA) Division 3 to enter the Western Region Football League (WRFL) in Division 2 for the 2018 Season.

In 2018 the Club entered 2 teams (Point Cook Blue & Point Cook Red) into the Western Region Football League (WRFL) Inaugural netball Competition, where Point Cook Blue won the Inaugural Victoria University Western Region Football League (WRFL) Netball Premiership Defeating Braybrook Red by 34 goals.

Also in 2018 in its first year in the Western Region Football League (WRFL) Division 2 competition the Seniors took out the Premiership Defeating Yarraville Seddon Eagles by 7 points at Avalon Airport Oval, Werribee. Gaining promotion into Division 1 in Season 2019.

Due to the growth of Female Football, the Club entered a Senior Women's team into the Western Region Football League (WRFL) Competition for the 2019 Season.

In June 2022, Point Cook Junior Massimo D'Ambrosio, was selected at Pick 3 in the 2022 AFL Mid Season Draft, by Essendon. Massimo became the first Point Cook Junior to be drafted by an AFL Club. And in Round 14 2022 Massimo made his AFL debut against St Kilda. 2 weeks later Massimo was the Round 16 NAB AFL Rising Star Nominee for his match against Sydney.

== Club honours ==
=== Honour Board ===
Season	President	Vice President	Administrator	Treasurer
2004	Steve Ward	Wayne Tandy		Les Mayne
2005	Steve Ward	Wayne Tandy	Carol Mills	Les Mayne
2006	Steve Ward	Wayne Tandy	Carol Mills	Les Mayne
2007	Steve Ward	Wayne Tandy		Wayne Gough
2008	Steve Ward	Wayne Tandy	Jeff Curmi	Wayne Gough
2009	Steve Ward	Wayne Tandy	Jeff Curmi	Wayne Gough
2010	Steve Ward	Jeff Curmi	Samantha Pruscino	Wayne Gough
2011	Steve Ward	Anthony MacGibbon	Samantha Pruscino	Wayne Gough
2012	Steve Ward	Anthony MacGibbon	Samantha Pruscino	Wayne Gough
2013	Steve Ward	Anthony MacGibbon	Samantha Pruscino	Wayne Gough
2014	Steve Ward	Anthony MacGibbon (Snr); Mark King (Jnr)	Ivo Havard	Wayne Gough
2015	Anthony MacGibbon	Ivo Havard	Jason Ware	Wayne Gough
2016	Anthony MacGibbon	Donna Morgan	Jason Ware	Wendy Morrison
2017	Ivo Havard	Anthony MacGibbon (Snr); Jason Ware (Jnr)	Alicia Colley	David Rouvray
2018	Ivo Havard	Anthony MacGibbon (Snr); Peter Gardner (Jnr)	Alicia Colley (Snr); Nick Ladbrooke (Jnr)	David Rouvray
2019	Ivo Havard	Brett Archer (Snr); Dean Lawlor (Jnr)	Alicia Colley (Snr); Rachael Trembath (Jnr)	Ashley May
2020	Cameron McKenzie	Brett Archer (Snr); Ivo Havard (Jnr)	Alicia Colley (Snr); Peta Kortum (Jnr)	Ashley May
2021	Cameron McKenzie	Brett Archer (Snr); Vicky Adorno (Jnr)	Alicia Colley (Snr); Peta Kortum (Jnr)	Ashley May
2022	Cameron McKenzie; Ivo Havard	Brett Archer (Snr); Kirk Heberle (Jnr)	Andrew Gough (Snr); Alison Gray (Jnr)	Ashley May
2023	Ivo Havard	David Rouvray (Snr); Samuel Fragapane (Jnr)	Jason Ware (Snr); Vicky Adorno (Jnr)	Andrew Gough
2024	Ivo Havard	Dean Longmuir (Snr); Samuel Fragapane (Jnr)	Jason Ware (Snr); Vicky Adorno (Jnr)	Andrew Gough
2025	David Rouvray	Dean Longmuir (Snr); Samuel Fragapane (Jnr); Anna Hercan (W & G)	Jason Ware (Snr); Alex Martin (Jnr)	Andrew Gough
2026	David Rouvray	Dean Longmuir (Snr); Samuel Fragapane (Jnr); Anna Hercan (W & G)	Jason Ware (Snr); Alex Martin (Jnr)	Andrew Gough
2027	Samuel Fragapane	Dean Longmuir (Snr); Alex Martin (Jnr); Anna Hercan (W & G)	Jason Ware (Snr); Katie McDougall (Jnr)	Andrew Gough

=== Best Clubperson ===
- Shane Comino† - 2005
- Derek Gatt - 2006
- Wayne Gough - 2007
- Sam Lachimia - 2008
- Susanne Gough - 2009
- Julie Ward - 2009
- Anthony MacGibbon - 2010
- Shane Comino† - 2012
- Toni Waugh - 2013
- David Cook - 2014
- Andrew Gough - 2015
- Karen Cook - 2016
- Rachael Archer - 2017
- Toni Waugh - 2017
- Peter Gardner - 2018
- Andrew Gough - 2018
- Donna Morgan - 2019
- David Rouvray - 2019
- Scott Johnston - 2021

=== Shane Comino Memorial Best Clubperson ===
At the 2022 Senior Presentation Night the Club announced that from 2022 the Club's Best Clubperson Award will be now known as the Shane Comino Memorial Best Clubperson, following the passing of 2-time Best Clubperson recipient and Life Member, Shane Comino in February 2022.

- Kirk Heberle - 2022
- Sam Armeri - 2023
- Vicky Adorno - 2023
- Peta Kortum - 2024
- Tina Solano - 2024
- Leanne MacGibbon - 2025
- Ashley May - 2025
- Sarah Flack - 2026
- Aaron McDougall - 2026

=== Life Members ===
- Steve Ward - 2013
- Shane Comino† - 2013
- Wayne Gough - 2014
- Anthony MacGibbon - 2015
- Andrew Gough - 2019
- Ivo Havard - 2022
- Peter Gardner - 2022
- Toni Waugh - 2024
- David Rouvray - 2024
- Paul Harmer - 2025
- Jason Ware - 2025
- Matthew Harmer - 2026

=== Premierships: 29 ===
- Senior: 1

- Division 2 (WRFL) - 2018 (Point Cook 9.14 - 68 Def Yarraville Seddon Eagles 8.13 - 61)

- Netball: 3

- Netball Division 1 (WRFL) - 2018 (Point Cook Blue 47 Def Braybrook Red 13)
- Netball Division 5 (WRFL) - 2023 (Point Cook 23 Def Laverton 21)
- Netball Division 4 (WFNL) - 2024 (Point Cook 32 Def Glen Orden 19)

- Under 18: 2

- Under 18 Division 2 (WRFL) - 2011 (Point Cook 12.9 - 81 Def Deer Park 6.10 - 46)
- Under 19 Women Division 1 (EDFL) - 2026 (Point Cook 4.5 - 29 Def Ascot Vale/West Coburg 0.3 - 3)

- Junior: 23

- Under 14 Division D (WRFL) - 2008 (Point Cook 11.11 - 77 Def Flemington Juniors 5.5 - 35)
- Under 13 Division B (WRFL) - 2011 (Point Cook 4.12 - 36 Def Caroline Springs 4.5 - 29)
- Under 11 Division A (WRFL) - 2014 (Point Cook 6.5 - 41 Def Williamstown Juniors 0.2 - 2)
- Under 11 Division C (WRFL) - 2014 (Point Cook 6.11 - 47 Def Wyndham Suns 5.3 - 33)
- Under 13 Division A (WRFL) - 2016 (Point Cook 10.10 - 70 Def Williamstown Juniors 8.6 - 54)
- Under 13 Division C (WRFL) - 2016 (Point Cook 5.2 - 32 Def Caroline Springs 2.5 - 17)
- Under 15 Division 2 (WRFL) - 2017 (Point Cook 10.7 - 67 Def Albion 8.16 - 64)
- Under 14 Division 1 (WRFL) - 2017 (Point Cook 12.20 - 92 Def Caroline Springs 5.14 - 44)
- Under 13 Division 1 (WRFL) - 2017 (Point Cook 10.14 - 74 Def St Bernard's 5.10 - 40)
- Under 14 Division 1 (WRFL) - 2018 (Point Cook 6.12 - 48 Def St Bernard's 1.2 - 8)
- Under 13 Division 1 (WRFL) - 2018 (Point Cook 5.8 - 38 Def Williamstown Juniors 3.5 - 23)
- Under 16 Division 1 (WRFL) - 2019 (Point Cook 7.13 - 55 Def Caroline Springs 6.9 - 45)
- Under 14 Division 1 (WRFL) - 2019 (Point Cook 7.6 - 48 Def Williamstown Juniors 2.3 - 15)
- Under 12 Division 3 (WRFL) - 2019 (Point Cook 9.9 - 63 Def Newport Power Juniors 1.3 - 9)
- Under 14 Division 1 (WRFL) - 2022 (Point Cook 5.9 - 39 Def Williamstown Juniors 5.4 - 34)
- Under 12 Division 1 (WRFL) - 2023 (Point Cook 4.3 - 27 Def Williamstown Juniors 2.6 - 18)
- Under 12 Division 3 (WFNL) - 2024 (Point Cook 5.1 - 31 Def Werribee Districts 2.4 - 16)
- Under 16 Girls Division 1 (WFNL) - 2025 (Point Cook 8.10 - 58 Def Williamstown Juniors 1.2 - 8)
- Under 16 Girls Division 2 (WFNL) - 2025 (Point Cook 4.5 - 29 Def Newport Power 3.6 - 24)
- Under 14 Division 4 (WFNL) - 2025 (Point Cook 10.9 - 69 Def Suns 7.8 - 50)
- Under 16 Division 1 (WFNL) - 2026 (Point Cook 14.12 - 96 Def Werribee Districts 12.5 - 77)
- Under 16 Division 3 (WFNL) - 2026 (Point Cook 9.20 - 74 Def Point Cook Centrals 7.6 - 48)
- Under 12 Division 2 (WFNL) - 2026 (Point Cook 8.8 - 56 Def Williamstown Juniors 2.7 - 19)

=== League Best & Fairest: 33 ===
- Senior Men: 1

- Jordan Lampi - VAFA Division 4 Seniors - 2012

- Senior Women: 1

- Kymberly Bays - WRFL Senior Women Division 1 - 2021

- Netball: 2

- Jenna Goricanec - WRFL Netball - 2018
- Jane Goodier - WRFL Netball Division 2 - 2021

- Under 18: 5

- Jordan Lampi - WRFL Under 18 Division 2 - 2011
- Jessi Lampi - WRFL Under 18 Division 1 - 2012
- Kai Logan - WRFL Under 18 Division 2 - 2021
- Cooper Mullens - WRFL Under 18 Division 1 - 2023
- Charlie O'Connor Moreira - WRFL Under 18 Girls - 2023

- Junior: 24

- Elliott Phasey - WRFL Under 14 Division D - 2005
- Andrew Gilmore - WRFL Under 16 Division C - 2007
- Samuel Georgiovski - WRFL Under 14 Division D - 2007
- Nicholas Buykx - WRFL Under 15 Division A - 2013
- Massimo D'Ambrosio - WRFL Under 11 Division A - 2013
- Massimo D'Ambrosio - WRFL Under 11 Division A - 2014
- Joshua Kuppen - WRFL Under 11 Division C - 2014
- Massimo D'Ambrosio - WRFL Under 12 Division A - 2015
- Bailey Moffatt - WRFL Under 14 Division 1 - 2017
- Massimo D'Ambrosio - WRFL Under 15 Division 1 - 2018
- Diesel Moloney - WRFL Under 14 Division 1 - 2019
- Thomas Burton - WRFL Under 12 Division 1 - 2019
- Nazzareno Foti - WRFL Under 12 Division 4 - 2019
- Michael Cilmi - WRFL Under 16 Division 1 - 2021
- Max Clark - WRFL Under 12 Division 1 - 2021
- Thomas Burton - WRFL Under 16 Division 1 - 2022
- Angus Tippett - WRFL Under 14 Division 1 - 2022
- Braith Lafaialii - WRFL Under 12 Division 1 - 2022
- Chloe Tate - WRFL Under 15 Girls Division 2 - 2023
- Kobe Page - WRFL Under 12 Division 1 - 2023
- Hylton Hoang - WRFL Under 12 Division 4 - 2023
- Kobe Page - WFNL Under 14 Division 1 - 2025
- Udayveer Bhardwaj - WFNL Under 16 Division 5 - 2026
- Ivy Skipper - WFNL Under 12 Girls Division 2 - 2026

== AFL Players ==
- Massimo D'Ambrosio - Essendon 2022 - 2023; Hawthorn 2024 -
- Thomas Burton - Richmond 2026 -

== Seniors ==
=== Senior Honour Board ===
Senior Honour Board
Season	Coach	Captain(s)	Best & Fairest	Leading Goalkicker	League/Division	Finishing Position	Note:
2027	Saade Ghazi	TBC			WRFL - Div. 1		
2026	Saade Ghazi	Lochlan Allen; Billy Kolyniuk; Shaun Wyatt	Billy Kolyniuk	Zayne Galea - 27	WRFL - Div. 1	10/12	
2025	Saade Ghazi	Nicholas Buykx	Billy Kolyniuk	Michael Cilmi - 37	WRFL - Div. 1	8/12	
2024	Clay Smith	Nicholas Buykx	Austin Hodge	Michael Cilmi - 20	WRFL - Div. 1	9/9	
2023	Clay Smith	Nicholas Buykx	Daniel Burton	Max Rouvray - 47	WRFL - Div. 1	2/8	Qualified 2nd after H&A. Lost Grand Final to Werribee Districts.
2022	Brett Jacobs	Nicholas Buykx	Nicholas Buykx	Luke Denny - 20	WRFL - Div. 1	9/10	
2021	Brett Jacobs	Elliott Wood	Nicholas Poland	Joshua Kuppen - 8	WRFL - Div. 1	10/10	
2020	Brett Jacobs; Michael Boothey	(No competition due to COVID-19 pandemic)					
2019	Ian Denny	Mason Kip	Matthew Poland	Lochlan Allen - 21	WRFL - Div. 1	9/10	
2018	Ian Denny	Mason Kip	Jessi Lampi	Kirk Heberle - 33	WRFL - Div. 2	1/8	Qualified 2nd after H&A. Won Club's Inaugural Senior Premiership against Yarraville Seddon Eagles. Promoted to Division 1 in 2019.
2017	Ian Denny	Mason Kip	Robbie Milne	Tristan Furr - 23	VAFA - D3	8/10	
2016	Ian Denny	Mason Kip	Mason Kip	William Dawson - 87	VAFA - D4	2/9	Qualified 2nd after H&A. Lost Grand Final to Westbourne Grammarians. Promoted to Division 3 in 2017.
2015	Ian Denny	Mason Kip; Paul Hegarty	Mason Kip	William Dawson - 50	VAFA - D4	6/11	Qualified 3rd after H&A. Lost Qualifying Final to Box Hill North.
2014	Ian Denny	Barry Langley; Paul Hegarty	Mason Kip; Robbie Milne	Haydn Wilkinson - 26	VAFA - D4	7/10	
2013	Daniel Fraser	Travis Cassidy	Andrew Auciello	Rick Munn - 39	VAFA - D4	5/11	Qualified 4th after H&A. Lost Qualifying Final to West Brunswick.
2012	Daniel Fraser	Aaron Marsh; Travis Cassidy	Tristan Furr	Aaron Marsh - 45	VAFA - D4	4/10	First Finals appearance. Lost to Eley Park. Jordan Lampi won League B&F
2011	Daniel Fraser		Mark Pozzuto	Aaron Marsh - 74	VAFA - D4	7/10	
2010	Daniel Fraser		Glen McGaw	Aaron Marsh - 67	VAFA - D4	10/11	

Reserves Honour Board
Season	Coach	Captain(s)	Best & Fairest	Leading Goalkicker	League/Division	Finishing Position	Note:
2027	Ben Aquilina	TBC			WRFL - Div. 1 Reserve		
2026	David Da Silva; Ben Aquilina	TBC	Baylen Lawlor	Sam Barbuto - 24	WRFL - Div. 1 Reserve	10/12	
2025	David Da Silva & Brendan Koch	James Borg	Noah Rizzoli	James Borg - 19	WRFL - Div. 1 Reserve	10/12	
2024	Nathan Bratby	Jordan Roache	Jordan Roache	Matthew Harmer - 13	WRFL - Div. 1 Reserve	7/9	
2023	Nathan Bratby	Jack Craig	Matthew Harmer	Matthew Harmer - 10	WRFL - Div. 1 Reserve	7/8	
2022	Nathan Bratby	TBA	Tyson Roache	Matthew Harmer - 10	WRFL - Div. 1 Reserve	10/10	
2021	Todd Caulfield	Nicolas Blade; James Borg	Dominik Morrison	Mitchell Waugh - 9	WRFL - Div. 1 Reserve	8/10	
2020	Todd Caulfield	(No competition due to COVID-19 pandemic)					
2019	Cameron McKenzie	Luke Mulquiney	Nicolas Blade	Cameron D'Altera - 13	WRFL - Div. 1 Reserve	8/10	
2018	Cameron McKenzie	Luke Mulquiney	Jordan Roache	Ricky Munn - 27	WRFL - Div. 2 Reserve	2/8	Qualified 2nd after H&A. Lost Grand Final to Yarraville Seddon Eagles.
2017	Cameron McKenzie	Jared Smith	Mitchell Chandler	Thomas Smith - 18	VAFA - D3 Reserve	8/10	
2016	David Da Silva	William Cameron	Tristan Furr	Matthew Harmer - 26	VAFA - D4 Reserve	2/9	Qualified 4th after H&A. Lost Grand Final to Westbourne Grammarians.
2015	Dean Chambers		Chris Matcham	Domenic Favata - 27	VAFA - D4 Reserve	3/11	Qualified 3rd after H&A. Lost preliminary final to Westbourne Grammarians.
2014	Chris Jones		Luke Rappazzo	Peter Donoghue - 21	VAFA - D4 Reserve	9/10	
2013	Bradley Ward	Cameron Cox	Michael James	Brett Hunter - 38	VAFA - D4 Reserve	5/11	Qualified 5th after H&A. Lost Qualifying Final to West Brunswick.
2012	John Panjari / Bradley Ward		Ryan Barker	Neil Burton - 32	VAFA - D4 Reserve	5/10	
2011				Khalid Haddara - 29	VAFA - D4 Reserve	8/10	
2010					VAFA - D4 Reserve		

== Senior Team records ==
=== Senior Record against other clubs ===
==== VAFA (2010 - 2017) ====
Point Cook FC's win–loss record against other VAFA clubs (2010 - 2017) (Senior Matches Only - Correct to end of 2017 Season)
Club	P	W	L	D	Win%	P	W	L	Win%	P	W	L	Win%
Club	Overall (includes Finals)					Finals (includes Grand Finals)				Grand Finals			
Albert Park	2	2	0	0	100.00	-	-	-	-	-	-	-	-
Box Hill North	14	8	5	1	57.14	1	0	1	0.00	-	-	-	-
Canterbury	5	0	5	0	0.00	-	-	-	-	-	-	-	-
Chadstone	12	12	0	0	100.00	-	-	-	-	-	-	-	-
Dragons	4	4	0	0	100.00	-	-	-	-	-	-	-	-
Eley Park	10	1	9	0	10.00	1	0	1	0.00	-	-	-	-
Hawthorn Amateurs	3	0	3	0	0.00	-	-	-	-	-	-	-	-
La Trobe University	2	0	2	0	0.00	-	-	-	-	-	-	-	-
Manningham	13	8	5	0	61.54	-	-	-	-	-	-	-	-
Masala	4	4	0	0	100.00	-	-	-	-	-	-	-	-
Monash Gryphons	1	0	1	0	0.00	-	-	-	-	-	-	-	-
Mt Lilydale OC	11	6	5	0	54.55	1	1	0	100.00	-	-	-	-
North Brunswick	14	12	2	0	85.71	-	-	-	-	-	-	-	-
Northern Blues	2	2	0	0	100.00	-	-	-	-	-	-	-	-
Parkside	2	2	0	0	100.00	-	-	-	-	-	-	-	-
Power House	2	0	2	0	0.00	-	-	-	-	-	-	-	-
Richmond Central	6	3	3	0	50.00	-	-	-	-	-	-	-	-
South Melbourne Districts	2	2	0	0	100.00	-	-	-	-	-	-	-	-
South Mornington	7	2	5	0	28.57	-	-	-	-	-	-	-	-
St Francis Xavier	2	0	2	0	0.00	-	-	-	-	-	-	-	-
Swinburne University	7	2	5	0	28.57	-	-	-	-	-	-	-	-
UHS-VU	2	0	2	0	0.00	-	-	-	-	-	-	-	-
West Brunswick	6	2	4	0	33.33	1	0	1	0.00	-	-	-	-
Westbourne Grammarians	9	2	7	0	22.22	2	0	2	0.00	1	0	1	0.00
Totals	142	74	67	1	52.11	6	1	5	16.67	1	0	1	0.00

==== WRFL (2018 - ) ====
Point Cook FC's win–loss record against other WRFL clubs (2018 - ) (Senior Matches Only - Correct to end of 2025 Season)
Club	P	W	L	D	Win%	P	W	L	Win%	P	W	L	Win%
Club	Overall (includes Finals)					Finals (includes Grand Finals)				Grand Finals			
Albanvale	3	3	0	0	100.00	-	-	-	-	-	-	-	-
Albion	6	4	2	0	66.67	-	-	-	-	-	-	-	-
Altona	15	4	11	0	26.67	1	1	0	100.00	-	-	-	-
Caroline Springs	13	3	10	0	23.08	-	-	-	-	-	-	-	-
Deer Park	5	0	5	0	0.00	-	-	-	-	-	-	-	-
Hoppers Crossing	12	3	9	0	25.00	-	-	-	-	-	-	-	-
Manor Lakes	3	3	0	0	100.00	-	-	-	-	-	-	-	-
Newport	3	1	2	0	33.33	-	-	-	-	-	-	-	-
Newport Power	3	3	0	0	100.00	-	-	-	-	-	-	-	-
North Footscray	2	2	0	0	100.00	-	-	-	-	-	-	-	-
Parkside	8	3	5	0	37.50	1	1	0	100.00	-	-	-	-
Point Cook Centrals	9	7	2	0	77.78	-	-	-	-	-	-	-	-
Spotswood	11	3	8	0	27.27	-	-	-	-	-	-	-	-
St Albans	6	1	5	0	16.67	-	-	-	-	-	-	-	-
Sunshine	10	5	5	0	50.00	-	-	-	-	-	-	-	-
Werribee Districts	15	0	15	0	0.00	2	0	2	0.00	1	0	1	0.00
West Footscray	2	2	0	0	100.00	-	-	-	-	-	-	-	-
Yarraville Seddon Eagles	16	4	11	1	25.00	2	1	1	50.00	1	1	0	100.00
Totals	142	51	90	1	35.92	6	3	3	50.00	2	1	1	50.00

==== Overall ====
Point Cook FC's Overall win–loss record against other clubs (2010 -) (Senior Matches Only - Correct to end of 2025 Season)
Club	P	W	L	D	Win%	P	W	L	Win%	P	W	L	Win%
Club	Overall (includes Finals)					Finals (includes Grand Finals)				Grand Finals			
VAFA (2010 - 2017)	142	74	67	1	52.11	6	1	5	16.67	1	0	1	0.00
WRFL (2018 - )	142	51	90	1	35.92	6	3	3	50.00	2	1	1	50.00
Totals	284	125	157	2	44.01	12	4	8	33.33	3	1	2	33.33
