= Suns Football Club =

Australian Football club in Melbourne

Suns FNC

Names
- Full name: Suns Football Netball Club
- Nickname: Suns

Club details
- Founded: 2014; 12 years ago as the Wyndham Suns
- Colours
- Competition: Western Football Netball League (2014–)
- President: Gordon Rae
- Coach: Roger Hand
- Premierships: WFNL Division 3 (1): 2023
- Ground: Goddard Street Reserve, Tarneit

Uniforms
Home

Other information
- Official website: https://websites.mygameday.app/club_info.cgi?clubID=22453&c=1-25-0-0-0

The Suns Football Netball Club is an Australian rules football club based in the western Melbourne suburb of Tarneit, which has competed in the Western Football Netball League (WFNL) since 2014. The club plays their home games at Goddard Street Reserve in Tarneit, where they field senior and reserves men's sides, as well as a senior women's side and multiple junior sides. The club also fields three netball teams in divisions 3, 4 and 7 of the WFNL's netball competition.

== History ==
The Wyndham Suns were formed in 2014, and first fielded a senior men's side in 2015. They finished 4th that season and made finals, defeating Point Cook Centrals in their first final, but were defeated by Albanvale the following week.

The club made the 2018 Division 3 grand final, but lost to Point Cook Centrals by 25 points. Following this loss, the Suns lost many players and were in poor form at the beginning of the 2019 season, but turned things around by the end of the season, even beating eventual premiers Glen Orden, despite not making finals. After the COVID-affected seasons of 2020 and 2021, where finals were not played, the club returned to the grand final in 2022, but lost to Braybrook by only 2 points. In the 2023 season they managed to make yet another senior grand final, where they defeated Albanvale by 2 points to claim their first senior premiership. The reserves side also defeated Albanvale that day, which marked their second reserves premiership (their first was in 2015, also against Albanvale).

The club debuted the senior women's side in 2024, who finished 3rd that season to secure a spot in the finals, only to be defeated by Parkside in their first final. They made their first grand final in 2026, defeating Yarraville Seddon by 24 points to claim their first premiership.

WFNL League Best & Fairest Winners
Season	Best and Fairest Winner	Division
2015	Grant Jones	Division 3 Reserves
2016	Christopher Stephens	Division 3 Reserves
2017	Daniel Hovey	Division 3 Seniors
2021	John Tomelty	Division 3 Seniors
2023	Daniel Hovey	Division 3 Seniors
2024	Akima Manoah	Senior Women's Division 1
2024	Chantel Mikulic	Senior Netball Division 4
