= Eddie Ford (footballer, born 2002) =

Australian rules footballer

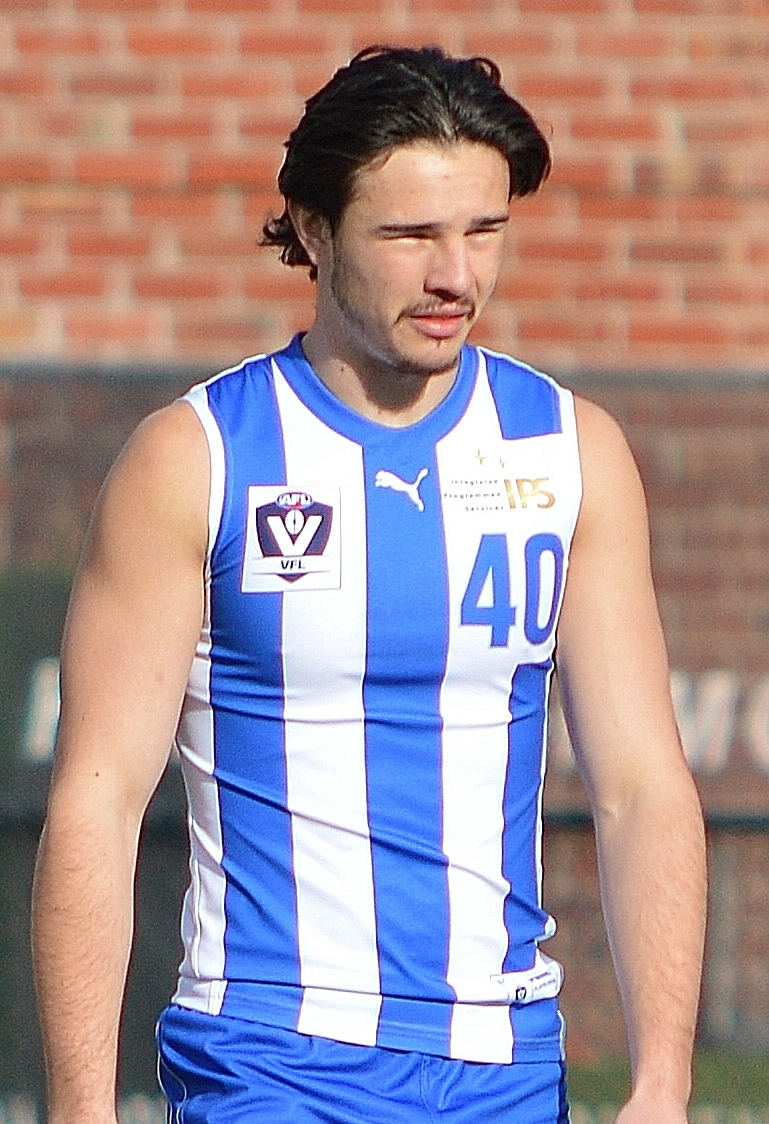
- Ford with North Melbourne's VFL side in July 2022

Personal information
- Full name: Edward Mark Ford
- Nickname: Elvis
- Born: 21 June 2002 (age 24)
- Original teams: Western Jets (Talent League); Yarraville Seddon (WFNL)
- Draft: No. 56, 2020 national draft
- Debut: Round 20, 2021, North Melbourne vs. Geelong, at Bellerive Oval
- Height: 189 cm (6 ft 2 in)
- Weight: 86 kg (190 lb)
- Position: Forward / Wing

Playing career
Years	Club	Games (Goals)
2021–2025	North Melbourne	40 (31)

Career highlights
- Rising Star nomination: 2023

Eddie Ford (born 21 June 2002) is a former professional Australian rules footballer who played for the North Melbourne Football Club in the Australian Football League (AFL).

== Early life ==
A versatile player in his youth, Ford started at Yarraville-Seddon and the Point Cook Bulldogs in the Western Region Football League. He later played in the NAB Cup for the Western Jets.

A fleet footed wingman who often work he way into the midfield, Eddie uses his natural speed to weave his way through traffic.

== AFL career ==
Ford was drafted by North Melbourne with pick 56 of the 2020 AFL draft. Ford made his debut at Docklands Stadium against Western Bulldogs in round 16 of the 2021 season.

Ford played five games in his debut season, and only managed three games in his 2022. Ford spent most of the season in the reserves where he averaged two goals per game. 2023 became Ford's most successful season, breaking into the side mid-year and holding his position. Ford received a Rising Star nomination in the last game of the 2023 season.

Ford was delisted by North Melbourne following the 2025 season in which Ford did not feature at AFL level.

== Statistics ==
Legend
G	Goals	K	Kicks	D	Disposals	T	Tackles
B	Behinds	H	Handballs	M	Marks

Season	Team	No.	Games	Totals							Averages (per game)							Votes
Season	Team	No.	Games	G	B	K	H	D	M	T	G	B	K	H	D	M	T	Votes
2021	North Melbourne	40	5	3	3	24	14	38	21	4	0.6	0.6	4.8	2.8	7.6	4.2	0.8	0
2022	North Melbourne	40	3	1	0	5	7	12	7	2	0.3	0.0	1.7	2.3	4.0	2.3	0.7	0
2023	North Melbourne	40	14	12	4	92	103	195	66	20	0.9	0.3	6.6	7.4	13.9	4.7	1.4	0
2024	North Melbourne	40	18	15	11	117	89	206	74	35	0.8	0.6	6.5	4.9	11.4	4.1	1.9	0
2025	North Melbourne	40	0	—	—	—	—	—	—	—	—	—	—	—	—	—	—	0
Career			40	31	18	238	213	451	168	61	0.8	0.5	6.0	5.3	11.3	4.2	1.5	0
