= Wyndham Vale (disambiguation) =

Wyndham Vale is a suburb of Melbourne in Victoria, Australia.

Wyndham Vale may also refer to:

- Wyndham Vale railway station, in Manor Lakes, Victoria, Australia
- Wyndhamvale Football Club, based in the suburb
