= Buku Khamis =

Australian football league player

Personal information
- Born: 24 March 2000 (age 26); Sudan
- Original team: St Albans/Maribyrnong College/Western Jets
- Draft: Category B Rookie selection 2018
- Debut: 9 May 2021, Western Bulldogs vs. Carlton, at Docklands Stadium
- Height: 190 cm (6 ft 3 in)
- Weight: 85 kg (187 lb)
- Position: Key defender

Club information
- Current club: Western Bulldogs
- Number: 24

Playing career^{1}
Years	Club	Games (Goals)
2019–	Western Bulldogs	66 (21)
- ^{1} Playing statistics correct to the end of 2026.

Buku Khamis (born 24 March 2000) is an Australian rules footballer playing for the Western Bulldogs in the Australian Football League.

== Early life ==
Khamis was born in current day South Sudan, and in 2006 at the age of six he and his family moved to Australia as refugees. After watching a game at the MCG during his final year of Primary School in 2012, he joined a local team St Albans, playing the game for the first time. He made a mark at the club and in 2016 was selected to play for Western Jets in the Under 19 NAB League.

He has four brothers, one of whom is association football player Amanhom Khamis, who plays as a centre-back for RANS Nusantara in the Indonesian Championship.

== Career ==
Although he was overlooked during the 2018 AFL draft, he was selected shortly after as a Category B rookie by the Bulldogs.

After concerns about fitness led to him being seen as a "two million to one chance to debut" by coach Luke Beveridge, in 2021, he would finally make his debut in the Bulldogs Round 8 win against Carlton.

Due to only playing ten games since joining the club, including only one in 2023, there were calls for Khamis to leave the club to find more game time. Although he would instead sign a new one-year contract in October 2023.

== Statistics ==
Updated to the end of round 22, 2026.

Legend
G	Goals	K	Kicks	D	Disposals	T	Tackles
B	Behinds	H	Handballs	M	Marks

Season	Team	No.	Games	Totals							Averages (per game)							Votes
Season	Team	No.	Games	G	B	K	H	D	M	T	G	B	K	H	D	M	T	Votes
2021	Western Bulldogs	24	1	0	0	7	4	11	1	1	0.0	0.0	7.0	4.0	11.0	1.0	1.0	0
2022	Western Bulldogs	24	8	6	6	49	31	80	29	11	0.8	0.8	6.1	3.9	10.0	3.6	1.4	0
2023	Western Bulldogs	24	1	0	0	3	3	6	1	1	0.0	0.0	3.0	3.0	6.0	1.0	1.0	0
2024	Western Bulldogs	24	17	1	1	107	60	167	78	19	0.1	0.1	6.3	3.5	9.8	4.6	1.1	0
2025	Western Bulldogs	24	14	13	3	71	53	124	55	27	0.9	0.2	5.1	3.8	8.9	3.9	1.9	0
2026	Western Bulldogs	24	21	1	1	159	88	247	98	23	0.0	0.0	7.6	4.2	11.8	4.7	1.1	0
Career			62	21	11	396	239	635	262	82	0.3	0.2	6.4	3.9	10.2	4.2	1.3	0
