= Adam Contessa =

Australian rules footballer and coach

Personal information
- Full name: Adam Contessa
- Born: 29 December 1976 (age 49)
- Original team: North Melbourne Reserves
- Height: 176 cm (5 ft 9 in)
- Weight: 81 kg (179 lb)

Playing career^{1}
Years	Club	Games (Goals)
1997–2001	Western Bulldogs	45 (8)
- ^{1} Playing statistics correct to the end of 2001.

Adam Contessa (born 29 December 1976) is a former Australian rules footballer who played with the Western Bulldogs in the Australian Football League (AFL).

Contessa, who played reserves level football at North Melbourne, made his debut for the Western Bulldogs in 1997.

After making just five appearances in two years, Contessa was delisted by the club at the end of the 1998 AFL season, only to be given a second chance when they re-drafted him.

He was used in a variety of roles by coach Terry Wallace, including as a tagger, and was a semi regular member of the team in 1999. After missing the first two games of the 2000 season with a virus, Contessa played the remaining 21 games, including an elimination final.

After finishing his playing career, Contessa became a coach, leading Airport West from 2012 to 2013, Pascoe Vale from 2014 to 2017 and Sunshine from 2018 to 2020.
