= St Albans Football Club =

St Albans Football Club may refer to

- St Albans Football Club (GFL), an Australian rules football club in the Geelong Football League
- St Albans Football Club (WRFL), an Australian rules football club in the Western Region Football League
- St Albans Spurs, an Australian rules football club in the Victorian Women's Football League
- St Albans City F.C., an association football club in England
