= Sunshine Football Club =

Sunshine Football Club may refer to

- Sunshine Football Club (VFA), former Australian rules football club that competed in the Victorian Football Association
- Sunshine Football Club (WRFL), Australian rules football club that competes in the Western Region Football League
