= Western Rams Football Sporting Club =

Western Rams

Names
- Full name: Western Rams Football Sporting Club
- Nickname(s): Rams

Club details
- Founded: 1920 reformed 1992
- Colours: Black and Red
- Competition: Western Region Football League
- Premierships: 1927, 1953, 1960, 1961, 1964, 1965, 1966.
- Ground(s): Ian Cowie Recreation Reserve

The Western Rams Football Sporting Club, nicknamed the Rams, is an Australian rules football club affiliated with the Western Football Netball League. In June 2024 the club broke the longest losing streak with their first win since 2018.

The club was formerly known as the Rockbank Football Club before renaming in 2021.

The club is located 29 km north west of Melbourne in the town of Rockbank.

The current club was reformed in 1992. When they joined the Footscray District League.

The original club played in the Bacchus Marsh Football Association from 1920 until that competition ceased in 1973. They won seven premierships.

Rockbank Football Club - Timeline

- 1920 to 1928: Bacchus Marsh Football Association
- 1931 to 1936: Bacchus Marsh & Melton Football Association
- 1937 to 1948: Club in recess
- 1949 - 1972: Bacchus Marsh & Melton Football Association
- 1973 - 1991: Club in recess
- 1992 - 1999: Footscray District Football League
- 2000 - 2023: Riddell District Football League
- 2024 -: Western Region Football League

== Football Premierships ==
Seniors

- Bacchus Marsh District Football Association
  - 1927
- Bacchus Marsh & Melton District Football Association
  - 1953
- Bacchus Marsh District FL
  - 1960, 1961, 1964, 1965, 1966

== Football Runner Up ==
Seniors

- Bacchus Marsh District Football Association
  - 1925, 1926,
- Bacchus Marsh & Melton District Football Association
  - 1931, 1936, 1951, 1952
- Bacchus Marsh District FL
  - 1967
