= Laverton Magpies Football Club =

Laverton Magpies

Names
- Full name: Laverton Magpies Football Club
- Nickname(s): Magpies, Lavo

Club details
- Founded: 1924; 101 years ago
- Colours
- Competition: Western Region Football League (1988–)
- Ground(s): Laverton Park, Altona Meadows

Uniforms
Home

Other information
- Official website: lavertonmagpies.teamapp.com

The Laverton Magpies Football Club is an Australian rules football club which compete in the WRFL since 1988, They are based in the Melbourne suburb of Laverton, Victoria

== History ==
In 1924, the original Laverton Football Club was formed and participated for many years in the Werribee District and the Western Suburbs Football Leagues. In 1988 the club joined the Footscray District Football League where they currently participate in the 3rd Division. In 2000 the club changed their name to the Western Magpies Football Club. In 2001 the under 12 and under 14 sides both won premierships in B division causing all junior sides to play in A division the next season. In 2009 the club changed the name back to the Laverton Magpies Football Club.

== Premierships ==
- Western Region Football League
  - Division Three Seniors (1): 1989
  - Division Three reserves (1): 1994
  - Under 12 (2): 2000, 2001
  - Under 14 (2): 2001, 2005
  - Under 16 (1): 2004

== Bibliography ==
- History of the WRFL/FDFL by Kevin Hillier – ISBN 9781863356015
- History of football in Melbourne's north west by John Stoward – ISBN 9780980592924
