= Albion Football Club (WRFL) =

Albion

Names
- Full name: Albion Football Netball Club
- Nickname: Cats

Club details
- Founded: 1961; 65 years ago
- Colours
- Competition: Western Region Football League (s. 1961)
- Premierships: 4 (1965, 1985, 1986, 2010)
- Ground: Parsons Reserve, Sunshine

Uniforms
Home

Other information
- Official website: albionfcsportsclub.com

The Albion Football Club is an Australian rules football club which has competed in the Western Region Football League (WRFL) since 1961. Despite the name, they are now based in the Melbourne suburb of Sunshine, rather than in the club’s original home in the adjacent suburb of Albion.

== History ==
When Sunshine FC were admitted to the VFA in 1959, the club decided not to support a third open age team in the FDFL. The players from this Sunshine thirds were worried about getting a game by the 1961 season. As Albion was a growth suburb at the time it was decided to create a football club for the suburb so the Albion Football Club was founded.

2020 Albion was relegated to Division 2
2021 Albion Cats add a Netball team in the WRFL Netball Competition
2021 Albion has its first win since round 9 2018

== Grand Finals ==
- Western Region Football League (Seniors)
- Division One Wins:
- 2010 Albion 14.11.95 d Spotswood 11.12.78
- 1986 Albion 14.22.106 d Wembley Park 10.7.67
- 1985 Albion 15.10.100 d Sunshine YCW 11.19.85
- 1965 Albion 14.11.95 d Parkside 12.12.84
- Division One Losses:
- 2011 Albion 7.13.55 lost to Spotswood 12.18.90
- 1988 Albion 7.4.46 lost to St Albans 10.4.64
- 1978 North Footscray 10.12.72 def Albion 9.9.63
- 1976 Seddon 9.12.66 def Albion 7.14.56
- 1974 Braybrook 11.10.76 def Albion 9.9.63
- 1973 Albion 9.8.62 lost to Braybrook 15.12.102
- 1969 Albion 11.16.82 lost to St Albans 13.6.84
- Division Two Wins:
- 1994 Albion 18.12.120 d Sunshine YCW 11.17.83

Western Region Football League (Reserves)

- Division One (8): 2010, 2009, 1988, 1979, 1976, 1975, 1970, 1968
- Division Two (1): 2023

Western Region Football League (Under Age)

  - Division One Under 18 (1): 1992
  - Division One Under 18 (1): 2009
  - Division One Under 17 (2): 1974, 1975,
  - Division Two Under 17 (1): 1990
  - Division Two Under 16 (2): 2011, 2013
  - Division Three Under 16 (1): 2002
  - Division Two Under 15 (1): 1983
  - Division One Under 14 (1): 1971
  - Division Three Under 14 (1): 2012
  - Division Two Under 12 (3): 2002, 2003, 2007
  - Division Three Under 12 (1): 2001
  - Division One Under 11 (3): 1977, 1979, 1980
  - Division Two Under 11 (3): 1976, 1986, 1988,
  - Division One Under 10 (1): 1978

== Victorian Metro Representatives ==
- 2018 Jonathon O'Brien
- 2016 Josh Bench

== WRFL Best and Fairest ==
- Western Region Football League (Div 1 Seniors)
- 1988 J. Taylor
- 1965 D. Prior
- 1962 J. Gaylor
- Western Region Football League (Div 1 Reserves)
- 2008 A. Moore
- 2005 M. Brasher
- 2003 B. Franksen
- 1988 G. Bate
- 1977 A. Hall
- 1973 W. Trusler
- Western Region Football League (Div 2 Seniors)
- 1994 D. Page
- 1993 D. Page
- Western Region Football League (Div 2 Reserves)
- 1994 S. Ivkovic
- Western Region Football League (A3 Open Age)
- 1993 J. Baars
- 1991 D. Anderson
- 1988 M. Woods
- Western Region Football League (A5 Open Age)
- 1985 J. Dearaugo
- Western Region Football League (Div 1 Under 18)
- 2010 J. McPherson
- 2005 M. Nicolaides
- Western Region Football League (Div 2 Under 18)
- 1993 A. Saliba

== Lindsay Patching Memorial Trophy ==
2019 Chantelle Hyett & Matt Bettin
1988 A. Wright
1976 D. Mills

== EJ Whitten Medalists ==
Division One
2019 Ladd John
2018 Nicholas Weightman
2017 Josh Bench

== Bibliography ==
- History of the WRFL/FDFL by Kevin Hillier – ISBN 9781863356015
- History of football in Melbourne's north west by John Stoward – ISBN 9780980592924
