= Port Melbourne Colts Football Club =

Port Melbourne Colts

Names
- Full name: Port Melbourne Colts Football Netball Club
- Nickname: Port Colts

Club details
- Founded: 1957; 68 years ago
- Colours: Red Blue
- Competition: Southern Football League SNFL Division 1 (2016-Current) Western Region Football League (prior to 2016)
- President: Stephen Duvnjak
- Coach: Lindsay Gilbee
- Premierships: 1960, 70, 71, 72, 73, 75, 79, 81, 85, 90, 98, 99, 2005, 2006, 2016
- Ground: JL Murphy Reserve, Port Melbourne

Uniforms
Home

Other information
- Official website: https://portmelbournecolts.teamapp.com

The Port Melbourne Colts Football Club is an Australian rules football club and Senior Netball Club which joined the Southern Football League (Victoria) from 2016.

== History ==
The Club first came into being in 1957.

It was put together by three men, Alex James, Brian " Moppa " McBroom and John Berti. It all started when a group of young men had been playing in the YCW competition, at under 18 level, and having won the Premiership, wanted to stay together after they turned 18.

They then decided to play for a club named, Middle Park YCW, which in fact was the first year of our Club, it was called Middle Park Colts. As just about everyone who played for the team came from Port Melbourne the name was changed in 1958 to Port Colts, and the team commenced to playing at The Lagoon Oval in Graham Street, where we it remained for several years, until finally moving to our present home at Murphy Reserve in the late 60's.

The club originally played in the Sunday Suburban Football League, then the Melbourne Amateur Sunday Football Association. With the demise of the local football Sunday competitions, the Club turned to Saturdays and entered the Metropolitan Football League in 1969, where it remained for 6 years.

The Club then went into the Southern Football League for a few years, then to the Western Suburban League, which soon merged with the Footscray District League, and is now the Western Region Football League.

The club remained in the WRFL after the merge for 16 more years mostly competing in Division 1, before moving back to the Southern League in 2016 where they now compete in Division 1.

The Club originally started with just the one open-age team, until 1972, when the Reserves were added, and then in 1975 the juniors commenced, and have continued to the present day, they now have junior teams from under tens through to senior level for both Men and Women.

In 2021, Senior Netball joined the club and name of the Club was updated to include Netball in the name.

=== Competitions ===
- Sunday Suburban Football League 1957–1960
- Melbourne Amateur Sunday Football Association 1961–1968
- Metropolitan Football League 1969–1974
- South East Suburban Football League 1975–1980
- West Suburban Football League 1981–1983
- Footscray District League 1984–1999
- Western Region Football League 2000–2015
- Southern Football Netball League 2016–

== Premierships ==
- Sunday Suburban = 1960
- Metropolitan = 1970, 1971, 1972, 1973
- South East Suburban = 1975 (Division 2)
- West Suburban = 1981 (Division 2)
- Footscray District/Western Region Div 1 = 1998, 1999, 2005, 2006
- Div 2 = 1990
- Div 2 Women's SFNL = 2015
- Southern Football Netball League Div 2 = 2016
- Southern Football Netball League - Netball Div A2 = 2022
- Southern Football Netball League - Netball Div C3 = 2022

== Life Members ==
- V. Clauscen 1957
- I. Ross 1960
- M. Marriner 1961
- B. Green 1964
- A. James # 1965
- B. McBroom # 1966
- D. Manson 1967
- J. May 1968
- J. Penaluna 1969
- K. O’Hara 1971
- R. Twomey 1972
- F. Richardson 1973
- G. Briggs 1975
- M. Twomey # 1975
- D. Degenhardt 1977
- A. Leadingham 1977
- P. Burke 1979
- D. Henry 1980
- P. Bailey 1982
- P. McDonald 1987
- M. Sheehan # 1987
- J. Sutcliffe 1988
- C. Boyd 1990
- M. McDonald * 1991
- E. Imbriano 1992
- B. Bracken 1993
- W. Riddoch 1994
- V. Smith 1995
- B. Cockle 1995
- P. McNamee 1996
- M. Penaluna 1996
- G. Winchcombe 1997
- R. Davey 1998
- L. Stuart 1999
- C. Doyle 1999
- B. McQuade 2000
- D. Morris 2001
- M. Riley 2001
- G. Booth 2001
- M. Wood 2001
- P. Ilsley 2002
- T. Maher 2002
- A. Birch 2002
- S. Spencer 2002
- R. Mantle 2002
- C. Riddoch * 2002
- D. Cooper 2003
- P. Snow * 2004
- S. Snow 2005
- S. Critch * 2006
- R. Kelce # 2006
- S. Weir 2007
- C. Morris 2008
- K. Bracken 2008
- P. Van Oost 2009
- J. Perkins 2010
- D. Stevens 2010
- J. Russell 2010
- D. Booth * 2011
- M. Burns 2011
- M. Hargraves 2011
- M. Dawson 2012
- P. De Bruyn 2013
- J. Clarke 2013
- K. Breen 2014
- E. Stevens 2015
- J. Wharton * 2015
- R. Laing 2016
- F. Caldwell 2016
- B. Jacobs 2016
- S. Massis 2017
- B. Twomey 2017

== Club Legends ==
- J. Penaluna 2008
- L. Stuart 2008
- D. Manson 2016

== 2021 ==
- Senior Coach; Graeme Yeats
- President; Stephen Duvnjak
- Vice President; Ben Smith
- Treasurer; Eleanor Gurry
- Secretary; Matt Marrangon
- Captain; Justin Taylor & Jake Wood

== Honour Board ==
- YEAR PRESIDENT | SECRETARY | TREASURER | BEST & FAIREST | FOOTBALL COACH | SENIOR CAPTAIN
- 1957 G. Williamson A. James J. Berti P.O’Brien B. McBroom A. James
- 1958 G. Williamson A. James M. Marriner J. Penaluna B. McBroom R. Fennessy
- 1959 G. Clauscen D. Manson M. Marriner B. Kerr B. McBroom P. O’Brien
- 1960* G. Clauscen D. Manson M. Marriner K. Cassidy B. McBroom B. White
- 1961 W. Ford / A. James V. Clauscen M. Marriner P. Donnelly B. McBroom P. Donnelly
- 1962 A. James B. Spence B. Manson P. Donnelly B. McBroom L. Aghan
- 1963 A. James D. Manson J. May L. Aghan B. McBroom/J.Penaluna L. Aghan
- 1964 A. James D. Manson J. May R. Jenkins B. McBroom T. Paulin
- 1965 A. James D. Manson D. Manson R. Twomey B. McBroom D. Manson
- 1966 A. James D. Manson D. Manson D. McCormack J. Penaluna J. Penaluna
- 1967 A. James D. Manson D. Manson J. Clapp J. Penaluna J. Penaluna
- 1968 A. James D. Manson D. Manson D. McCormack J. Penaluna J. Penaluna
- 1969 A. James D. Manson N. Hind R. Jenkins J. Penaluna J. Penaluna
- 1970* A. James D. Manson N. Hind D. Degenhardt J. Penaluna J. Penaluna
- 1971* A. James D. Manson N. Hind M. Twomey J. Penaluna J. Penaluna
- 1972* A. James D. Manson N. Hind P. Bailey / D. Degenhardt J. Penaluna R. Twomey
- 1973* A. James D. Manson N. Hind D. Degenhardt J. Penaluna R. Twomey
- 1974 A. James D. Manson N. Hind W. Hanna J. Penaluna R. Twomey
- 1975* A. James D. Manson N. Hind T. Doolan Jo. Sutcliffe Jo. Sutcliffe
- 1976 A. James T. Stewart M. Twomey K. McNamee Jo. Sutcliffe Jo. Sutcliffe
- 1977 A. James T. Stewart M. Twomey D. Degenhardt J. May Jo. Sutcliffe
- 1978 A. James T. Stewart M. Twomey Je. Sutcliffe J. May D. Degenhardt
- 1979 J. Penaluna D. Henry M. Twomey T. Doolan J. May D. Degenhardt
- 1980 J. Penaluna D. Henry M. Twomey P. McDonald C. Pasquill D. Degenhardt
- 1981* J. Penaluna D. Henry M. Twomey R. Laing C. Pasquill Je. Sutcliffe
- 1982 D. Manson D. Henry M. Twomey M. Davine C. Pasquill Je. Sutcliffe
- 1983 D. Manson D. Henry D. Degenhardt G. Winchcombe A. Leadingham Je. Sutcliffe
- 1984 D. Manson D. Henry D. Degenhardt A. Birch/R.Laing/F.Caldwell S. Camov S. Camov
- 1985* G. Mathieson M. McDonald D. Henry R. Laing A. Birch R. Davey
- 1986 G. Mathieson M. McDonald D. Henry F. Caldwell A. Birch R. Laing
- 1987 B. McBroom M. McDonald J. Lang F. Caldwell G. Bellesini D. Gates
- 1988 B. McBroom M. McDonald F. Caldwell F. Caldwell C. Boyd F. Caldwell
- 1989 B. Cockle G. Daley M. Sheehan C. Doyle G. Booth G. Booth
- 1990* B. McBroom M. McDonald M. Sheehan E. Muench G. Booth C. Doyle
- 1991 P. McDonald M. McDonald M. Sheehan G. Booth S. McBroom M. Dawson
- 1992 P. McDonald M. Penaluna B. Cockle S. McBroom S. McBroom M. Dawson
- 1993 C. Boyd M. Penaluna B. Cockle D. Cooper S. McBroom M. Dawson
- 1994 C. Boyd M. Penaluna B. Cockle D. Cooper L. Aghan M. Dawson
- 1995 C. Boyd M. Penaluna B. Cockle B. Doyle J. Love J. Love
- 1996 P. Ilsley M. Penaluna B. Cockle J. Love S. Doyle B. Doyle
- 1997 P. Ilsley M. Penaluna M. Dell K. Daley D. Tuddenham M. Spence
- 1998* P. Ilsley M. Penaluna M. Dell S. Pearce D. Tuddenham M. Spence
- 1999* P. Ilsley C. Riddoch B. Bracken S. Pearce M. Larkin R. Mantle
- 2000 P. Ilsley C. Riddoch D. Keltie J. Lindsay M. Larkin S. Pearce
- 2001 P. Ilsley C. Riddoch B. Cockle A. Newman R. Hart J. O’Neill
- 2002 W. Bracken J. Penaluna C. Riddoch J. O’Neill R. Hart B. Jacobs
- 2003 P. Van Oost J. Penaluna C. Riddoch J. Lindsay J. Clarke J. O’Neill*
- 2004 D. Nettlefold J. Penaluna P. Ilsley J. Lindsay J. Clarke J. Clarke
- 2005* G. Lawrow J. Penaluna B. Cockle E. Webb J. Clarke J. Clarke
- 2006* M. Hargraves P. Snow G. Booth B. Julier J. Clarke B. Jacobs
- 2007 M. Hargraves P. Snow G. Booth S. Caddy J. Clarke B. Jacobs
- 2008 P. Ilsley / P. McDonald P. Snow T. McMaster D. Jacobs J. Clarke B. Jacobs
- 2009 P. Ilsley P. Snow T. Troon D. Jacobs J. Clarke B. Jacobs
- 2010 K. Breen P. Snow G. Booth B. Julier P. Lunt B. Twomey
- 2011 K. Breen P. Snow J. Wharton / S. Critch B. Julier P. Lunt B. Twomey
- 2012 M. Dawson P. Snow P. Rowlands B. Julier / B. Sutcliffe B. Burke B. Twomey
- 2013 J. Perkins / M. Hargraves D. Booth P. & J. Rowlands B. Sutcliffe B. Burke B. Twomey
- 2014 B. Brown P. Snow / B. Donovan P. & J. Rowlands J. Taylor J. Love B. Twomey
- 2015 B. Brown P. Snow P. & J. Rowlands B. Sutcliffe B. Julier B. Twomey
- 2016* P. Snow P. Snow M. Pain L. Mildenhall B. Julier B. Twomey / S. Massis
- 2017 J. Clarke P. Snow M. Pain L. Mildenhall G. Daley S. Massis / J. Wood
- 2018 S. Duvnjak A. Cardwell J. Penaluna J. Wood G. Daley J. Wood
- 2019 S. Duvnjak S. Duva E. Gurry C. Deluca L. Gilbee J. Wood / J. Taylor
- 2020 S. Duvnjak M. Marangon E. Gurry (N/A) L. Gilbee J. Wood / J. Taylor
- 2021 S. Duvnjak M. Marangon E. Gurry G. Yeats J. Wood / J. Taylor

== Books ==
- A Rearing Stallion – Bob Donovan - - ISBN 9780992493912
- History of the WRFL/FDFL – Kevin Hillier - - ISBN 9781863356015
- History of football in Melbourne's north west - John Stoward - ISBN 9780980592924
