= Western Football Netball League =

Australian semi-professional sports league

- Formerly: Footscray District Football League (1931−2000); Western Region Football League (2000−2023)
- Sport: Australian rules football
- Founded: 1931; 95 years ago
- No. of teams: 24
- Country: Australia
- Most recent champions: Caroline Springs (Div 1); North Footscray (Div 2)
- Most titles: Spotswood (16)
- Website: https://wfnl.com.au

The Western Football Netball League (WFNL) is a semi-professional Australian rules football and netball league, based in the western suburbs of Melbourne.

== History ==
The league was formed in 1931 as the Footscray District Football League (FDFL).

During the 1950s, the VFL club Footscray was financially backing the competition, so they decided to bar clubs that were inside the Essendon zone. This resulted in six clubs leaving. More changes occurred in 1952 as the league decided that clubs had to provide an under-18 competition; this action reduced the club numbers down to twelve. The next initiative was the introduction of an under-16 competition in 1954.

In 1988, the league absorbed clubs from the West Suburban Football League; and, in 2000, to reflect the fact that the league had expanded across the western suburbs, it changed its name to the Western Region Football League (WRFL).

In 2002, the league, in particular its second Division, found itself a national audience when a Seven Network reality TV show, The Club, followed the performance of a team called the Kensington Hill Hammerheads throughout the season. The players, coach and president were chosen on the show, and after finishing third in the regular season, went on to win the flag.

In 2006, the league suspended the Central Altona Football Club for attempting to re-register a player, and they suspended Brunswick Power after the club was found guilty of playing unregistered players. In addition, Central Altona also had a variety of on-field violence and abuse issues, and they were also in trouble for re-registering banned players. Brunswick Power returned for the next season, but folded at the end of 2007.

In 2013, Manor Lakes and Sanctuary Lakes entered the Division Two of the senior competition. In 2014, Werribee Districts transferred from the VAFA, and Tarneit entered a senior team. The league then announced that a third division will form midway through 2014.

In 2015, the Wyndham Suns were admitted to the third division. Parkside, which won the second division premiership in 2014, suffered a bitter internal division and lost most of the players and committee. Instead of being promoted to first division, Parkside staved off recess and were permitted to rebuild the club in the third division.

The league changed its name to the Western Football Netball League in early 2024. Division 3 was abolished following the 2023 season. Eynesbury and the Western Rams joined the competition from the Riddell District Football Netball League for the 2024 season.

In 2026, with Men's netball increasing in prominence, the league started a men's netball league. This was the first suburban/regional men's club netball competition in Australia.

== Clubs ==
Participating clubs for the 2025 season:

=== Division One ===
Club	Colours	Nickname	Home ground	Former League	Est	Years in comp	WFNL Senior Premierships	
Club	Colours	Nickname	Home ground	Former League	Est	Years in comp	Total	Most Recent
Albion		Cats	JR Parsons Reserve, Sunshine	–	1961	1961–	4	2010
Altona (Altona City 1969–92)		Vikings	JK Grant Reserve, Altona	VSDFL, WDFA, WSFL	1918	1933–1937, 1945–1951, 1977–1979, 1988–	7	2022
Caroline Springs		Lakers	Society 1056 Oval, Caroline Springs	–	2002	2011–	2	2026
Hoppers Crossing		Warriors	Hogans Road Reserve, Hoppers Crossing	WSFL	1972	1988–	4	2024
Newport		Panthers	AW Langshaw Reserve, Altona North	–	2005	2016–	1	2016
Point Cook		Bulldogs	Saltwater Reserve, Point Cook	VAFA	2003	2018–	1	2018
Point Cook Centrals (Sanctuary Lakes 2012–17)		Sharks	Featherbrook Reserve, Point Cook	–	2012	2013–	2	2022
Spotswood		Woodsmen	Donald W McLean Reserve, Spotswood	VSDFL	1927	1935–	17	2011
Sunshine (Sunshine YCW 1978-2000)		Kangaroos	Kinder Smith Reserve, Braybrook	YCWFL	1959	1978–	1	2024
Werribee Districts		Tigers	Soldiers Reserve, Werribee	VAFA	1995	1995–1997, 2014–	2	2025
Yarraville Seddon		Eagles	Yarraville Oval, Yarraville	–	2006	2007–	2	2019

=== Division Two ===
Club	Colours	Nickname	Home ground	Former League	Est	Years in comp	WFNL Senior Premierships	
Club	Colours	Nickname	Home ground	Former League	Est	Years in comp	Total	Most Recent
Albanvale		Cobras	Robert Bruce Reserve, Deer Park	VAFA	1978	1978–1988, 1993–	1	2015
Braybrook		Brookers	Pennell Reserve, Braybrook	NDFA	1874	1931–	19	2022
Laverton		Magpies	Laverton Park, Altona Meadows	WSFL	1924	1988–	1	1989
North Footscray		Devils	Hansen Reserve, West Footscray	–	1934	1935–	8	2026
Suns (Wyndham Suns 2014–21)		Suns	Goddard Street Reserve, Tarneit	VAFA	2013	2015–	1	2023
Sunshine Heights		Dragons	Ainsworth Reserve, Sunshine West	WSFL	1971	1988–	3	2008
Tarneit		Titans	Wootten Road Reserve, Tarneit	–	2014	2014–	0	-
West Footscray		Roosters	Skinner Reserve, Braybrook	–	1932	1932–	7	2007
Western Rams (Rockbank 1992–99)		Rams	Ian Cowie Recreation Reserve, Rockbank	RDFNL	1992	1992-1999, 2024–	0	-
Wyndhamvale		Falcons	Wyndham Vale South Oval, Wyndham Vale	GDFL	1979	1989–1994, 1999–	2	2025

=== Thirds Only ===
Club	Colours	Nickname	Home ground	Former League	Est	Years in comp	WFNL Senior Premierships	
Club	Colours	Nickname	Home ground	Former League	Est	Years in comp	Total	Most Recent
Glen Orden		Hawks	Heathdale Oval, Werribee	–	1979	1976–2016, 2018–2022, 2024-	4	2019
Manor Lakes		Storm	Howqua Reserve, Manor Lakes	–	2012	2013–2019, 2026-	0	-
North Sunshine		Roadrunners	Dempster Park, Sunshine North	–	1967	1979–	2	2003
Truganina		Thunder	Mainview Oval, Truganina	–	2019	2026-	0	-
Werribee Centrals		Centurions	Galvin Park, Werribee	–	1969	2025-	0	-

=== Club locations ===
Locations of the 2025 WRFL clubs. Red pogs represent teams in Division One, yellow pogs represent teams in Division Two, cyan pogs represent teams only participating in the thirds competition, and black is for junior-only clubs.

=== Former clubs ===
Club	Colours	Nickname	Home Ground	Former League	Est.	Years in WFNL	WFNL Senior Premierships		Fate
Club	Colours	Nickname	Home Ground	Former League	Est.	Years in WFNL	Total	Most Recent	Fate
6th Melbourne Scouts				–	1930s	1934–1952	1	1949	Folded
Altona North Brooklyn Youth (ANBY)			AW Langshaw Reserve, Newport	–	1980s	1985–1991	0	-	Folded
Ascot Vale		Devils	Walter Reserve, Ascot Vale	EDFL	1930	1988–1997	1	1989	Folded in 1997
Bacchus Marsh thirds		Cobras	Maddingley Park, Maddingley	–	1978	2024–2025	0	-	Withdrew WFNL thirds team after 2025 season
Bayview Road Methodists				–		1931	0	-	Folded
Braybrook YCW			Dobson Reserve, Maidstone			?	0	-	Folded
Brooklyn (Wembley Park 1981-90s)		Bulls	McIvor Reserve, Yarraville	–	1981	1981–2002	1	1991	Moved to Southern FNL in 2003
Brunswick		Lions	Fleming Park, Brunswick East	VAFA	1926	1995–1998	0	-	Returned to VAFA in 1999
Brunswick Power		Power	Fleming Park, Brunswick East	VAFA	2001	2004–2007	0	-	Folded in 2007
Central Altona		Tigers	Crofts Reserve, Altona North	WSFL	1966	1988–2006	0	-	Expelled from league in 2006
Coburg Districts		Lions	Cole Reserve, Pascoe Vale	EDFL	1951	1988-2012	1	1988	Returned to Essendon District FL in 2013
Combined Churches (Paisley Baptist Church of Christ 1934-35)				–	1934	1934–1940	1	1935	Moved to Werribee District FL in 1944
CSR				–	1930s	1935–1939	0	-	Folded
Dark Blues		Blues		–	1932	1932	0	-	Folded
Deer Park		Lions	John McLeod Reserve, Deer Park	WDFL	1925	1935–1941, 1947–1951, 1967–2022	13	2019	Moved to Essendon District FL in 2023
East Brunswick		Magpies	Fleming Park, Brunswick East	YCWFL	1922	1987–1993	0	-	Moved to Southern FNL in 1994
Essendon ALP				–	1937	1937	0	-	Folded
Essendon Districts		Dons	Essendon Recreation Reserve, Essendon	VJFA	1885	1945–1949	1	1945	Folded
Eynesbury		Eagles	Eynesbury Recreation Reserve, Eynesbury	RDFNL	2016	2024	0	-	Returned to Riddell District FNL following 2024 season
Fawkner Amateurs		Fawks	Charles Mutton Reserve, Fawkner	VAFA	1973	1996	0	-	Merged with Moomba Park to form Fawkner Park in 1997
Fawkner Park		Blues	Charles Mutton Reserve, Fawkner	–	1997	1997	0	-	Moved to in Diamond Valley FL in 1998
Flemington			McAlister Oval, Parkville	YCWFL	1945	1987–2000	1	1994	Folded in 2000
Footscray & Yarraville (F&Y) Socials			Angliss Reserve, West Footscray	–	1945	1946–1975	4	1963	Folded
Footscray Presbyterians				–	1934	1934	0	-	Folded
Footscray Scouts				–	1931	1931–1933	0	-	Folded
Footscray Tech Old Boys			Institute Oval, Footscray	–	1920s	1931	0	-	Moved to VAFA in 1932
Gladstone Park		Burras	Tullamarine Reserve, Tullamarine	EDFL	1976	1998–2007	0	-	Folded after 2007 season
Harvester Socials				–	1944	1944–1946	0	-	Folded
Hobsons Bay (Williamstown United 1939-93)		Sharks	Fearon Reserve, Williamstown	WSFL	1939	1939–1940, 1947–1949, 1988–1994	0	-	Moved to Werribee District FA in 1950. Folded in 1994
Kealba		Cougars	Green Gully Reserve, Keilor Downs	–	1995	1995–2002	0	-	Folded after 2002 season
Kensington Hill Hammerheads		Hammerheads	J J Holland Park, Kensington	–	2002	2002	1	2002	Folded after 2002 season
Kingsville YMCA			McIvor Reserve, Yarraville			1978-1980	0	-	Merged with Brooklyn to form Wembley Park in 1981
Maidstone		Stoners	Scovell Reserve, Maidstone	–	1908	1947-1964	1	1950	Moved to Western Suburan FL in 1965
Maribyrnong				NDFA	1900s	1947–1949	0	-	Folded
Newells		Imperials	Newell's Paddock, Footscray	–	1933	1933–1938	1	1934	Folded
Newlands Coburg (Coburg YCW 1987)		Cobras	Jackson Reserve, Coburg North	YCWFL	1984	1987–1993	0	-	Moved to VAFA in 1994
Newport (Newport United 1935-49)			Market Street Oval, Newport	MFL, WSFL	1935	1935–1949, 1952–1955, 1988–1999	1	1995	Moved to Metropolitan FL in 1950. Moved to Werribee District FA in 1956. Folded after 1999 season
Newport CYMS				–	1933	1941–1946	1		Folded
North Essendon (Essendon High School Ex-Students 1983-88)		Panthers	Buckley Park, Essendon	EDFL	1940s	1983–1996	1	1987	Folded in 1996
North Melbourne & Kensington		Kangaroos	JJ Holland Reserve, Kensington	–	1986	1986–1998	2	1996	Folded in 1998
Old Essendon Grammarians		Blues	PEGS Sporting Fields, Keilor Park	EDFL	1968	1983	0	-	Moved to VAFA in 1984
Paisley (St John's Church of England 1931)				–	1931	1931–1938	0	-	Folded
Parkside		Magpies	Henry Turner Reserve, Footscray	NMFL	1897	1931–2026	17	2023	Moved to Essendon District FL in 2027
Port Melbourne Colts		Colts	JL Murphy Reserve, Port Melbourne	WSFL	1957	1983–2015	5	2006	Moved to Southern FNL in 2016
RAAF Melbourne (RAAF Laverton 1984-89)			RAAF Laverton	–	1984	1984-1994	0	-	Folded in 1994
Riverside			Henry Turner Reserve, Footscray	–	1931	1932–1934	1	1932	Absorbed by Parkside in 1935
Seddon	(1970s)(1990s)(?-2006)	Hawks	Hanmer Reserve, Yarraville	–	1934	1935–2006	7	2001	Merged with Yarraville to form Yarraville Seddon Eagles in 2007
Seddon Rovers				–	1932	1932–1935	0	-	Folded
St Albans		Saints	Kings Park Reserve, Kings Park	MFL	1946	1947–1953, 1958–2022	6	2001	Expelled from league in 1954, re-formed in Metropolitan FL in 1957. Moved to Essendon District FL in 2023
St Albans South							0	-	Folded
Sandridge			Lagoon Reserve, Port Melbourne		1980s	1991-1992	0	-	Folded in 1992
South Footscray			Hansen Reserve, West Footscray			1935-1941, 1944-1949	2	1940	Folded
Sunshine Districts			Selwyn Park, Albion	–	1938	1938–1939, 1941–1958	1	1946	Moved to VFA in 1959
Sunshine Methodists				–	1934	1934	0	-	Folded
Sunshine VRI			Dobson Reserve, Maidstone			1991-1993	0	-	Folded
Victor Socials				–	1934	1934–1951	1	1939	Moved to Sunday Suburban FL as Brooklyn in 1952
Waratah (Friendship Circle 1944)				–	1944	1944–1952	0	-	Folded
West Newport		Lions	Loft Reserve, Newport	WSFL	1957	1957–1965, 1988–1997	2	1996	Played in Western Suburban FL between 1966-87. Folded in 1997
West Spotswood				–	1939	1939	0	-	Folded
Williamstown CYMS		Seagulls	Fearon Reserve, Williamstown	CYMSFA	1886	1965–1968	0	-	Moved to CYMSFA in 1969
Williamstown District				VSDFL	1928	1935-1943	0	-	Folded
Williamstown High School Old Boys				–	1950	1950–1952	0	-	Folded
Williamstown Presbyterians				–	1945	1945-1946	0	-	Folded
Williamstown Rovers	Light with dark monogram			–	1945	1945–1951	0	-	Moved to Werribee District FL in 1952
Williamstown United			Fearon Reserve, Williamstown	–	1938	1939–1940, 1947–1949	0	-	Folded
Yarraville (Kingsville 1936-95)	(1936-95)(1996-2006)	Tigers	Yarraville Oval, Yarraville	VAFA	1920s	1936–2006	5	2000	Merged with Seddon to form Yarraville Seddon Eagles in 2007
Yarraville CYMS				–	1931	1931–1932	0	-	Folded
Yarraville Old Boys				–	1950	1950–1952	0	-	Folded
Yarraville Rovers				–	1932	1932, 1935	0	-	Recess in 1933-34. Folded
Yarraville Socials				–	1935	1935–1947	0	-	Folded

== Premiers ==
=== Division One ===
Year	Premier	Score	Runner up	Margin
1931	Parkside	11.19.85 – 7.5.47	Braybrook	38
1932	Riverside	11.15.81 – 10.12.72	Parkside	9
1933	Parkside	19.22.136 – 10.10.70	Riverside	66
1934	West Footscray	9.10.64 – 8.7.55	Parkside	9
1935	West Footscray	12.12.84 – 10.8.69	Spotswood	15
1936	Parkside	11.8.74 – 5.8.38	Spotswood	36
1937	Parkside	15.11.101 – 8.13.61	Deer Park	40
1938	Spotswood	15.15.105 – 12.16.88	Deer Park	17
1939	Deer Park	14.14.98 – 8.13.61	Parkside	37
1940	Deer Park	8.8.56 – 7.12.54	North Footscray	2
1941	Deer Park	17.5.107 – 12.10.82	Parkside	25
1942	Braybrook	17.21.123 – 8.12.60	West Footscray	63
1943	Kingsville	6.12.48 – 3.8.26	Parkside	22
1944	Braybrook	7.7.49 – 5.18.48	West Footscray	1
1945	Braybrook	15.9.99 – 10.6.66	West Footscray	33
1946	Braybrook	9.12.66 – 8.15.63	West Footscray	3
1947	West Footscray	10.12.72 – 8.13.61	Braybrook	11
1948	Parkside	10.7.67 – 6.6.42	Braybrook	25
1949	Parkside	9.7.61 – 7.8.50	Sunshine Districts	11
1950	Seddon	12.5.77 – 3.9.27	Spotswood	50
1951	Parkside	14.8.92 – 12.9.81	West Footscray	11
1952	Braybrook	7.9.51 – 7.2.44	Seddon	7
1953	Seddon	5.8.38 – 2.7.19	Newport	19
1954	Braybrook	9.10.64 – 8.5.53	Newport	11
1955	Braybrook	8.15.63 – 7.11.53	Seddon	10
1956	Braybrook	11.7.73 – 9.9.63	Parkside	10
1957	Parkside	10.21.81 – 6.7.43	Kingsville	38
1958	Spotswood	10.7.67 – 9.9.63	Parkside	4
1959	F & Y Socials	11.6.72 – 3.5.23	Spotswood	49
1960	F & Y Socials	15.9.99 – 4.12.36	Spotswood	63
1961	F & Y Socials	12.7.79 – 5.11.41	Parkside	38
1962	Parkside	5.10.40 – 2.6.18	F & Y Socials	22
1963	F & Y Socials	11.17.83 – 6.9.45	Seddon	38
1964	Kingsville	10.21.81 – 9.7.61	Spotswood	20
1965	Albion	14.11.95 – 12.12.84	Parkside	11
1966	St Albans	11.22.88 – 8.9.57	Kingsville	31
1967	Parkside	16.9.105 – 12.14.86	Spotswood	19
1968	Spotswood	9.7.61 – 7.12.54	St Albans	7
1969	St Albans	13.6.84 – 11.16.82	Albion	2
1970	West Footscray	14.8.92 – 11.14.80	Spotswood	12
1971	Spotswood	15.12.102 – 14.15.99	Parkside	3
1972	Spotswood	10.15.75 – 9.13.67	North Footscray	8
1973	Braybrook	15.12.102 – 9.8.62	Albion	40
1974	Braybrook	11.10.76 – 9.9.63	Albion	13
1975	Braybrook	14.13.97 – 15.7.97	West Footscray	0
1975	Braybrook	10.16.76 – 9.10.64	West Footscray	12
1976	Seddon	9.12.66 – 7.14.56	Albion	10
1977	Spotswood	12.6.78 – 8.15.63	Kingsville	15
1978	North Footscray	10.12.72 – 9.9.63	Albion	11
1979	Braybrook	6.13.49 – 5.18.48	St Albans	1
1980	North Footscray	13.12.90 – 13.6.84	Spotswood	6
1981	Parkside	15.15.105 – 7.12.54	North Footscray	51
1982	West Footscray	16.8.104 – 9.15.69	St Albans	35
1983	North Footscray	12.14.86 – 12.11.83	Parkside	3
1984	Spotswood	16.16.112 – 7.12.54	Wembley Park	58
1985	Albion	15.10.100 – 11.19.85	Sunshine YCW	15
1986	Albion	14.22.106 – 10.7.67	Wembley Park	39
1987	Spotswood	18.8.116 – 11.11.77	Sunshine YCW	39
1988	St Albans	10.4.64 – 7.4.46	Albion	18
1989	St Albans	11.12.78 – 5.16.46	Deer Park	32
1990	Spotswood	21.17.143 – 8.8.56	Deer Park	87
1991	Seddon	18.15.123 – 12.15.87	Spotswood	36
1992	Seddon	12.3.75 – 8.7.55	Spotswood	20
1993	Spotswood	23.13.151 – 5.11.41	Seddon	90
1994	Deer Park	17.9.111 – 11.7.73	Spotswood	38
1995	Spotswood	17.7.109 – 10.12.72	Deer Park	37
1996	Parkside	17.11.113 – 16.10.106	Yarraville	7
1997	Yarraville	19.10.124 – 15.12.102	Parkside	22
1998	Port Melbourne Colts	13.8.86 – 10.7.67	Spotswood	19
1999	Port Melbourne Colts	8.21.69 – 8.4.52	Parkside	17
2000	Parkside	9.13.67 – 7.8.50	St Albans	17
2001	St Albans	15.19.109 – 10.7.67	Hoppers Crossing	42
2002	Hoppers Crossing	18.11.119 – 18.5.113	Parkside	6
2003	Parkside	11.8.74 – 10.9.69	Spotswood	5
2004	Hoppers Crossing	10.6.66 – 8.12.60	Port Melbourne Colts	6
2005	Port Melbourne Colts	12.16.88 – 6.7.43	Parkside	45
2006	Port Melbourne Colts	14.12.96 – 14.10.94	Hoppers Crossing	2
2007	Spotswood	13.10.88 – 11.16.82	Port Melbourne Colts	6
2008	Spotswood	13.15.93 – 11.17.83	Port Melbourne Colts	10
2009	Spotswood	13.13.91 – 10.13.73	Port Melbourne Colts	18
2010	Albion	14.11.95 – 11.12.78	Spotswood	17
2011	Spotswood	12.18.90 – 7.13.55	Albion	35
2012	Altona	14.7.91 – 12.18.90	Spotswood	1
2013	Deer Park	15.10.100 – 14.15.99	Spotswood	1
2014	Deer Park	22.26.158 – 12.9.81	Spotswood	77
2015	Deer Park	23.17.155 – 2.7.19	Werribee Districts	134
2016	Deer Park	25.21.171 – 8.9.57	Hoppers Crossing	116
2017	Deer Park	9.12.66 – 9.9.63	Sunshine	3
2018	Deer Park	12.17.89 – 6.7.43	Hoppers Crossing	46
2019	Deer Park	9.13.67 – 9.10.64	Altona	3
2020	Season not played (COVID-19 pandemic)			
2021	Season not completed (COVID-19 pandemic)			
2022	Altona	10.21 (81) – 9.4 (58)	Werribee Districts	23
2023	Werribee Districts	9.11 (65) – 5.13 (43)	Point Cook	22
2024	Hoppers Crossing	13.12 (90) – 14.5 (89)	Werribee Districts	1
2025	Werribee Districts	11.9 (75) – 9.9 (63)	Caroline Springs	12
2026	Caroline Springs	14.12 (96) – 8.15 (63)	Werribee Districts	33

=== Premiers by club (Division 1) ===
Club	Titles	Years won
Spotswood	15	1938, 1958, 1968, 1971, 1972, 1977, 1984, 1987, 1990, 1993, 1995, 2007, 2008, 2009, 2011
Parkside	14	1931, 1933, 1936, 1937, 1948, 1949, 1951, 1957, 1962, 1967, 1981, 1996, 2000, 2003
Braybrook	12	1942, 1944, 1945, 1946, 1952, 1954, 1955, 1956, 1973, 1974, 1975, 1979
Deer Park	11	1939, 1940, 1941, 1994, 2013, 2014, 2015, 2016, 2017, 2018, 2019
West Footscray	5	1934, 1935, 1947, 1970, 1982
Seddon	5	1950, 1953, 1976, 1991, 1992
St Albans	5	1966, 1969, 1988, 1989, 2001
F & Y Socials	4	1959, 1960, 1961, 1963
Albion	4	1965, 1985, 1986, 2010
Port Melbourne Colts	4	1998, 1999, 2005, 2006
North Footscray	3	1978, 1980, 1983
Yarraville	3	1943, 1964, (Note: As "Kingsville FC".) 1997
Hoppers Crossing	3	2002, 2004, 2024
Altona	2	2012, 2022
Werribee Districts	2	2023, 2025
Caroline Springs	1	2026

=== Division Two ===
Year	Premier	Score	Runner up	Margin
1934	Newells	13.13.91 – 9.12.66	Victor Socials	25
1935	Baptist Church of Christ	10.14.74 – 9.12.66	Spotswood	8
1936	Braybrook	7.20.62 – 7.7.49	North Footscray	13
1937	South Footscray	7.17.59 – 6.20.56	Braybrook	3
1938	North Footscray	10.17.77 – 8.7.55	Combine	22
1938	Victor Socials	10.5.65 – 6.17.53	Combine	12
1940	South Footscray	12.16.88 – 10.12.72	Combine	16
1941	West Footscray	20.13.133 – 11.13.79	Victor Socials	54
1942	Kingsville	17.12.114 – 11.13.79	Sunshine Districts	35
1943	Newport CYMS	9.16.70 – 7.9.51	Spotswood	19
1944	Spotswood	10.9.69 – 7.7.49	Sunshine Districts	20
1945	Essendon Districts	12.14.86 – 8.15.63	Yarraville Socials	23
1946	Sunshine Districts	11.17.83 – 8.5.53	Spotswood	30
1947	Altona	12.25.97 – 4.5.29	Waratah	68
1948	Spotswood	11.15.81 – 7.12.54	St Albans	27
1949 (Section 1)	North Footscray	8.19.67 – 9.10.64	Footscray & Yarraville Socials	3
1949 (Section 2)	6th Melbourne Scouts	15.18.108 – 5.4.34	West Footscray	74
1950	Maidstone	10.10.70 – 7.13.55	Williamstown Rovers	15
1951	Altona	12.12.84 – 11.7.73	Kingsville	11
No competition between 1952–1985
1986	North Sunshine	13.11.89 – 8.15.63	Essendon High School Old Scholars	26
1987	Essendon High School Old Scholars	22.10.142 – 4.10.34	North Sunshine	108
1988	Coburg Districts	7.10.52 – 5.10.40	Ascot Vale	12
1989	Ascot Vale	18.12.120 – 9.8.62	Williamstown United	58
1990	Port Melbourne Colts	16.18.114 – 12.10.82	Hoppers Crossing	32
1991	Altona City	10.14.74 – 7.13.55	Sunshine Heights	19
1992	Hoppers Crossing	5.12.42 – 4.5.29	East Brunswick	13
1993	Braybrook	9.15.69 – 7.4.46	Sunshine Heights	23
1994	Albion	18.12.120 – 11.17.83	Sunshine YCW	37
1995	West Newport	14.20.104 – 14.8.92	Sunshine YCW	12
1996	North Melbourne & Kensington	17.18.120 – 9.8.62	Fawkner Amateurs	58
1997	St Albans	15.15.105 – 9.9.63	North Footscray	42
1998	Seddon	10.10.70 – 8.6.54	Braybrook	26
1999	Braybrook	12.21.93 – 8.1.49	Central Altona	44
2000	Yarraville	12.18.90 – 6.8.44	Glen Orden	46
2001	Seddon	18.12.120 – 5.9.39	Albanvale	81
2002	Kensington Hill	11.12.78 – 7.11.53	North Footscray	25
2003	North Sunshine	12.9.81 – 6.12.48	Glen Orden	33
2004	Altona	11.14.80 – 8.7.55	Deer Park	25
2005	Altona	19.12.126 – 8.9.57	Glen Orden	69
2006	Glen Orden	13.20.98 – 8.8.56	Deer Park	42
2007	West Footscray	18.16.124 – 7.16.58	Sunshine Heights	66
2008	Sunshine Heights	18.7.115 – 7.11.53	North Footscray	62
2009	Deer Park	16.12.108 – 13.9.87	Parkside	21
2010	North Footscray	11.13.79 – 10.14.74	Parkside	5
2011	Deer Park	21.23.149 – 2.6.18	Albanvale	131
2012	Yarraville Seddon Eagles	14.14.98 – 9.16.70	Parkside	28
2013	Glen Orden	15.12.102 – 8.11.59	Parkside	43
2014	Parkside	14.20.104 – 10.6.66	West Footscray	38
2015	Wyndhamvale	17.12.114 – 10.5.65	West Footscray	49
2016	Caroline Springs	12.8.80 – 9.12.66	Yarraville Seddon Eagles	14
2017	North Footscray	15.14.104 – 6.10.46	Yarraville Seddon Eagles	58
2018	Point Cook	9.14.68 – 8.13.61	Yarraville Seddon Eagles	7
2019	Yarraville Seddon Eagles	14.17.101 – 4.10.34	Wyndhamvale	67
2020	Season not played (COVID-19 pandemic)			
2021	Season not completed (COVID-19 pandemic)			
2022	Point Cook Centrals	10.4 (64) – 7.6 (48)	Parkside	16
2023	Parkside	8.13 (61) – 8.11 (59)	Albion	2
2024	Sunshine	8.8 (56) - 6.13 (49)	Albion	7
2025	Wyndhamvale	13.2 (80) - 6.9 (45)	North Footscray	35
2026	North Footscray	14.8 (92) - 8.8 (56)	Wyndhamvale	36

=== Premiers by club (Division 2) ===
Club	Titles	Years won
Altona/Altona City	5	1947, 1951, 1991, 2004, 2005
North Footscray	5	1938, 1949 (Section 1), 2010, 2017, 2026
Braybrook	3	1936, 1993, 1999
Deer Park	2	2009, 2011
Glen Orden	2	2006, 2013
Parkside	2	2014, 2023
North Sunshine	2	1986, 2003
Seddon	2	1997, 2001
South Footscray	2	1937, 1940
Spotswood	2	1942, 1948
West Footscray	2	1941, 2007
Wyndhamvale	2	2015, 2025
Kingsville/Yarraville	2	1942, 2000
Yarraville Seddon Eagles	2	2012, 2019
6th Melbourne Scouts	1	1949 (section 2)
Ascot Vale	1	1989
Albion	1	1994
Baptist Church of Christ/Combine	1	1935
Caroline Springs	1	2016
Coburg Districts	1	1988
Essendon Districts	1	1945
Essendon High School Old Scholars	1	1987
Hoppers Crossing	1	1992
Kensington Hill	1	2002
Maidstone	1	1950
Newells	1	1934
Newport CYMS	1	1943
North Melbourne & Kensington	1	1996
Point Cook	1	2018
Point Cook Centrals	1	2022
Port Melbourne Colts	1	1990
St Albans	1	1997
Sunshine	1	2024
Sunshine Districts	1	1946
Sunshine Heights	1	2008
Victor Socials	1	1939
West Newport	1	1995

=== Division Three ===
Year	Premier	Score	Runner up	Margin
1988	Sunshine Heights	11.21.87 – 7.11.53	East Brunswick	34
1989	Laverton	2.16.28 – 4.3.27	Wyndhamvale	1
1990	Braybrook	16.16.112 – 11.9.75	East Brunswick	37
1991	Wembley Park	11.15.81 – 12.7.79	Glen Orden	2
1992	Glen Orden	8.11.59 – 5.5.35	Newport	24
1993	North Melbourne & Kensington	16.15.111 – 4.6.30	Newport	81
1994	Flemington	14.4.88 – 6.4.40	Wyndhamvale	48
1995	Newport	18.11.119 – 3.15.33	Albanvale	86
1996	West Newport	17.22.124 – 7.10.52	Albanvale	72
1997	Braybrook	18.18.126 – 10.16.76	Laverton	50
1998	Sunshine Heights	9.11.65 – 8.11.59	Gladstone Park	6
No competition between 1999–2013
2014	Braybrook	12.15.87 – 12.13.85	Albanvale	2
2015	Albanvale	12.12.84 – 7.7.49	Parkside	35
2016	Newport Power	12.8.80 – 6.11.47	Parkside	33
2017	Parkside	12.17.89 – 7.6.48	Tarneit	41
2018	Point Cook Centrals	9.11.65 – 5.10.40	Suns	25
2019	Glen Orden	10.12.72 – 6.10.46	Albanvale	26
2020	Season not played (COVID-19 pandemic)			
2021	Season not completed (COVID-19 pandemic)			
2022	Braybrook	6.14 (50) – 5.18 (48)	Suns	2
2023	Suns	14.11 (95) – 14.9 (93)	Albanvale	2
No competition after 2023

=== Premiers by club (Division 3) ===
Club	Titles	Years won
Braybrook	4	1990, 1997, 2014, 2022
Glen Orden	2	1992, 2019
Sunshine Heights	2	1988, 1998
Albanvale	1	2015
Flemington	1	1994
Laverton	1	1989
Newport	1	1995
Newport Power	1	2016
North Melbourne & Kensington	1	1993
Parkside	1	2017
Point Cook Centrals	1	2018
Suns	1	2023
Wembley Park	1	1991
West Newport	1	1996

== Leading Goalkickers (Andrew Gibson Medal) ==
Year	Player	H&A goals	Finals goals	Total Goals
1947	Walker (F&Y Socials)	82	0	82
1948	Ted Ellis (Braybrook)	74	10	84
1949	Wagborne (Parkside)	61	4	65
1950	Yewers (Braybrook)	66	1	67
1951	Wagborne (Parkside)	67	9	76
1952	Hansen (Seddon)	70	0	70
1953	Wallis (Parkside)	73	0	73
1954	Paravicini (Newport)	48	0	48
1955	G McDonald (Kingsville)	78	3	81
1956	Jewell (Seddon)	50	0	50
1957	Carlton (Parkside)	48	0	48
1958	Coon (Parkside)	70	7	77
1959	Coon (Parkside)	57	0	57
1960	D Lown (F & Y Socials)	43	11	54
1961	D Lown (F & Y Socials)	59	6	65
1962	A Russell (Parkside)	54	0	54
1963	A Russell (Kingsville)	68	4	72
1964	B Saunders (Kingsville)	61	2	63
1965	J McCalman (Albion)	52	0	52
1966	0	0	0	0
1967	0	0	0	0
1968	0	0	0	0
1969	0	0	0	0
1970	0	0	0	0
1971	0	0	0	0
1972	0	0	0	0
1973	0	0	0	0
1974	0	0	0	0
1975	0	0	0	0
1976	0	0	0	0
1977	0	0	0	0
1978	0	0	0	0
1979	0	0	0	0
1980	0	0	0	0
1981	0	0	0	0
1982	0	0	0	0
1983	Andrew Gibson (Spotswood)	96	4	100
1984	Andrew Gibson (Spotswood)	79	16	95
1985	Andrew Gibson (Spotswood)	98	0	98
1986	Andrew Gibson (Spotswood)	100	0	100
1987	Andrew Gibson (Spotswood)	88	0	88
1988	Andrew Gibson (Spotswood)	83	0	83
1989	Chris Stulhdrieier (Sunshine YCW)	79	0	79
1990	Brian Memedi (Kingsville)	70	0	70
1991	Darren Scott (Spotswood)	115	0	115
1992	Sean Allan (Port Melbourne Colts)	102	0	102
1993	Wayne Duggan (Deer Park)	97	11	108
1994	Brian Memedi (Kingsville)	99	0	99
1995	Brian Memedi (Kingsville)	69	0	69
1996	Brian Memedi (Yarraville)	105	0	105
1997	Brian Memedi (Yarraville)	82	0	82
1998	Stephen Nielson (Parkside)	77	0	77
1999	Jason Clarke (Port Melbourne Colts)	75	0	75
2000	Bill Ramsay (Braybrook)	88	0	88
2001	Tim Traill (Spotswood)	84	0	84
2002	Tim Traill (Spotswood)	71	0	71
2003	Jason Clarke (Port Melbourne Colts)	82	0	82
2004	Dean Galea (Spotswood)	74	0	74
2005	Aaron James (Albion)	70	0	70
2006	Jason Clarke (Port Melbourne Colts)	95	0	95
2007	Mark Keenan (Spotswood)	89	0	89
2008	Mark Keenan (Spotswood)	104	0	104
2009	David McGregor (Port Melbourne Colts)	69	0	69
2010	Mark Keenan (Spotswood)	111	0	111
2011	Shaydon Bloomfield (Albion)	93	0	93
2012	Jase Perkins (Port Melbourne Colts)	92	9	101
2013	Jayden Post (Altona)	65	7	72
2014	James Wong (Deer Park)	81	1	82
2015	Jordan Mead (Hoppers Crossing)	55	8	63
2016	Jase Perkins (Deer Park)	61	5	66
2017	James Condos (Deer Park)	65	7	72
2018	Patrick Rose (Altona)	75	4	79
2019	Jase Perkins (Deer Park)	71	5	76

== Women's competition ==
In 2018 the WRFL held a stand-alone women's competition for the first time as the number of women's clubs in the region grew large enough to allow this. In 2021 the competition expanded to two divisions. As of 2022 there were 14 women's teams across the two divisions, although by 2024 this number had dropped to 9 teams across 1 division.

Club	Colours	Nickname	Home ground	Former League	Est	Years in comp	WFNL Senior Premierships	
Club	Colours	Nickname	Home ground	Former League	Est	Years in comp	Total	Most Recent
Caroline Springs		Lakers	Society 1056 Oval, Caroline Springs	–	2002	2018-	2	2025
Laverton		Magpies	Laverton Park, Altona Meadows	–	2018	2018-2024, 2026-	0	-
North Footscray		Devils	Hansen Reserve, West Footscray	–	1934	2026-	0	-
Parkside Spurs		Spurs	Henry Turner Oval, Footscray	NFNL	1993	2023-	1	2026
Point Cook Centrals		Sharks	Featherbrook Reserve, Point Cook	–	2018	2018-2023, 2025-	1	2022
Suns		Suns	Goddard Street Reserve, Tarneit	VAFA	2024	2024–	2	2026
West Footscray		Roosters	Shorten Reserve, West Footscray	–	1932	2018-	1	2023
Werribee Centrals Juniors		Centurions	Galvin Park, Werribee	–	1969	2018-	1	2024
Wyndhamvale		Falcons	Wyndham Vale South Oval, Wyndham Vale	–	1979	2019-	0	-
Yarraville Seddon		Eagles	Yarraville Oval, Yarraville	–	2007	2019-	0	-

=== Premiers ===
==== Division 1 ====
Year	Premier	Score	Runner up	Margin
2018	Manor Lakes	8.11.59 – 1.2.8	Caroline Springs	51
2019	Spotswood	5.9.39 – 4.4.28	Caroline Springs	11
2020	Season not played (COVID-19 pandemic)			
2021	Season not completed (COVID-19 pandemic)			
2022	Caroline Springs	8.9.57 – 2.7.19	Spotswood	38
2023	Spotswood	5.5.35 – 5.4.34	Caroline Springs	1
2024	Werribee Centrals	6.3.39 – 5.7.37	Caroline Springs	2
2025	Caroline Springs	10.8.68 – 8.3.51	Yarraville Seddon Eagles	17
2026	Parkside Spurs	15.14.104 – 1.5 (11)	Wyndhamvale	93

==== Division 2 ====
Year	Premier	Score	Runner up	Margin
2022	Point Cook Centrals	9.8.62 – 4.1.25	Caroline Springs	37
2023	West Footscray	6.7.43 – 6.5.41	Wyndhamvale	2
2024-25	Recess			
2026	Suns	8.9.57 – 5.3.33	Yarraville Seddon Eagles	24

=== Former Women's Clubs ===
Club	Colours	Nickname	Home ground	Former League	Est	Years in comp	WFNL Senior Premierships		Fate
Club	Colours	Nickname	Home ground	Former League	Est	Years in comp	Total	Most Recent	Fate
Albanvale		Cobras	Robert Bruce Reserve, Deer Park	–	2021	2021-2022 (merged with Braybrook)	0	–	In recess
Braybrook		Brookers	Pennell Reserve, Braybrook	VWFL	1874	2019-2023 (merged with Albanvale 2021-22)	0	–	In recess
Hoppers Crossing		Warriors	Hogans Road Reserve, Hoppers Crossing	–	2021	2021-2023	0	–	In recess
Manor Lakes		Storm	Howqua Reserve, Manor Lakes	–	2018	2018-2022	1	2018	In recess
North Sunshine		Roadrunners	Dempster Park, Sunshine North	–	2018	2018-2025	0	–	In recess
Point Cook		Bulldogs	Saltwater Reserve, Point Cook	–	2019	2019-2023	0	–	In recess
Spotswood		Woodsmen	Donald W McLean Reserve, Spotswood	–	2018	2018-2023	2	2023	In recess
Tarneit		Titans	Wootten Road Reserve, Tarneit	–	2018	2018-2019	0	–	In recess

== Junior clubs ==
- Aintree
- Albanvale
- Albion
- Altona Juniors
- Caroline Springs
- Flemington Juniors
- Hoppers Crossing
- Manor Lakes
- Newport Power
- North Footscray
- North Sunshine
- PEGS Juniors
- Point Cook
- Point Cook Centrals
- Spotswood
- St Bernard's
- Sunshine
- Sunshine Heights
- Tarneit
- Truganina Thunder
- Werribee Centrals
- Werribee Districts
- West Footscray
- Williamstown Juniors
- Wyndham Suns
- Wyndhamvale
- Yarraville Seddon Eagles

=== Junior-Only Clubs ===
Club	Colours	Nickname	Home ground
Aintree		Giants	Frontier Recreation Reserve, Aintree
Flemington Juniors		Colts	JJ Holland Park, Kensington
Manor Lakes		Storm	Howqua Way Reserve, Manor Lakes
Newport Power		Power	Bryan Martyn Oval, Newport
PEGS Juniors		Bombers	PEGS Sports Fields, Keilor Park
St Bernards		Snowdogs	St Bernards College, Essendon West
Truganina		Thunder	Mainview Oval, Truganina
Williamstown Juniors		Seagulls	Bayside College, Williamstown

== Sources ==
- The Mail (Newspaper published in Footscray)
- Annual Reports of the Western Region Football League
- http://nla.gov.au/nla.news-article74738180
- http://footyscorearchive.wiki-site.com/index.php/WESTERN_REGION_FOOTBALL_LEAGUE

== Book ==
- History of the WRFL/FDFL – Kevin Hillier – ISBN 9781863356015
- History of Football in Melbourne's North West – John Stoward – ISBN 9780980592924
