= Nigel Kellett =

Australian rules footballer

Personal information
- Born: 18 December 1969 (age 56); Williamstown
- Original teams: Hoppers Crossing; Geelong College
- Height: 180 cm (5 ft 11 in)
- Weight: 82 kg (181 lb)
- Position: Wing/Half Forward

Playing career^{1}
Years	Club	Games (Goals)
1989–1997	Footscray	101 (41)
- ^{1} Playing statistics correct to the end of 1997.

Nigel Kellett (born 18 December 1969) is a former Australian rules footballer for Footscray in the Australian Football League (AFL).

== Playing career ==
Kellett made his debut for Footscray in the then-VFL (renamed AFL the following year) in 1989. He played 101 matches for the Bulldogs before leaving the AFL after the 1997 AFL season.
