= Manor Lakes Football Club =

Australian rules football club in Victoria

Manor Lakes

Names
- Full name: Manor Lakes Football Netball Club
- Nickname: Storm

Club details
- Founded: 2012; 14 years ago
- Colours
- Competition: Western Football Netball League (2013–)
- President: Shane White
- Ground: Howqua Road Reserve, Manor Lakes

Uniforms
Home

Other information
- Official website: www.mlfnc.com.au

The Manor Lakes Football Club is an Australian rules football club which compete in the Western Region Football League since 2013. They are based in the Melbourne suburb of Manor Lakes.

== History ==
Manor Lakes initially aimed to start a junior club for the 2013 season, but soon found demand for a senior game was also high in booming outer Melbourne suburb of Wyndhamvale. When the committee was first formed the aim was to provide for junior football in the area. But the overwhelming response to the Manor Lakes Facebook page and a few other outlets was too much to ignore so the committee set about bringing on senior football.

Manor Lakes developed a club jumper and Heath Hunter was appointed senior coach. fourteen players transferred with him from Trentham (in the MCDFL) . A further eighteen players have transferred from neighbouring clubs.

The club was admitted to WRFL 2nd Division for 2013. As of 2020 the senior side is in recess.

== Bibliography ==
- History of football in Melbourne's north west by John Stoward – ISBN 9780980592924
