= North Footscray Football Club =

North Footscray

Names
- Full name: North Footscray Football Club
- Nickname: Red Devils

Club details
- Founded: 1934; 92 years ago
- Colours: Red White
- Competition: WRFL (1935-)
- Premierships: 7 (1938, 1949, 1978, 1980, 1983, 2010, 2017)
- Ground: Walker Oval, West Footscray

Uniforms
Home

The North Footscray Football Club is an Australian rules football club which compete in the Western Region Football League (WRFL) since 1935. They are based in the Melbourne suburb of Footscray. They have won 3 senior premierships in division 1 and 4 senior premierships in division 2 and numerous premierships in lower grades. In 2016 the club consists of 2 senior teams and auskick.

== Honours ==
- Western Region Football League
  - Division One (3): 1978, 1980, 1983
  - Division One Reserves (1): 1980
  - Division One U18 (2): 1936, 1937
  - Division Two (5): 1938, 1949, 2010, 2017, 2026
  - Division Two Reserves (5): 1998, 1999, 2001, 2002, 2008
  - Division Two U18 (1): 2005
  - U16 C: 2012
  - U15 C: 1985
  - U14 C: 1997, 1998
  - U12 C: 2003, 2012

== League best and fairest winners ==
- Div 1 Seniors = E.Spence 1952 J Charles 1959 1963 R Murray 1961 T Flint 1971 A Ebeyer 1979
- Div 1 Reserves = J Anderson 1975 Greg Spurling 1987
- U18 Div 1 = J Watters 1941 J Miller 1956 K Beamish 1958 D Crea 1991
- Div 2 Seniors = D Williams 2003, 2004 K Murphy 2016
- Div 2 Reserves = M Bellingham 2016
- U18B = B Lucas 2008
- U16B = M Mumford 1961 N Richardson 2004 K Klix 2009
- U15B = T Ebeyer 1973
- U14A = M Coles 1999
- U14B = J Ebeyer 1970
- U14C = D DaSilva 1997 D Ellis 1998 M Eason 2008
- U13B = C Pagano 1976
- U13C = S Blomeley 1984 R Blomeley 1987
- U12C = S Smith 2002 D Sawad 2003 J Bennett 2008 K Bharati 2012
- U11B = C Pagano 1974 R Blomeley 1985

== Bibliography ==
- History of the WRFL/FDFL by Kevin Hillier – ISBN 9781863356015
- History of football in Melbourne's north west by John Stoward – ISBN 9780980592924
