= Wyndham Vale =

- Suburb
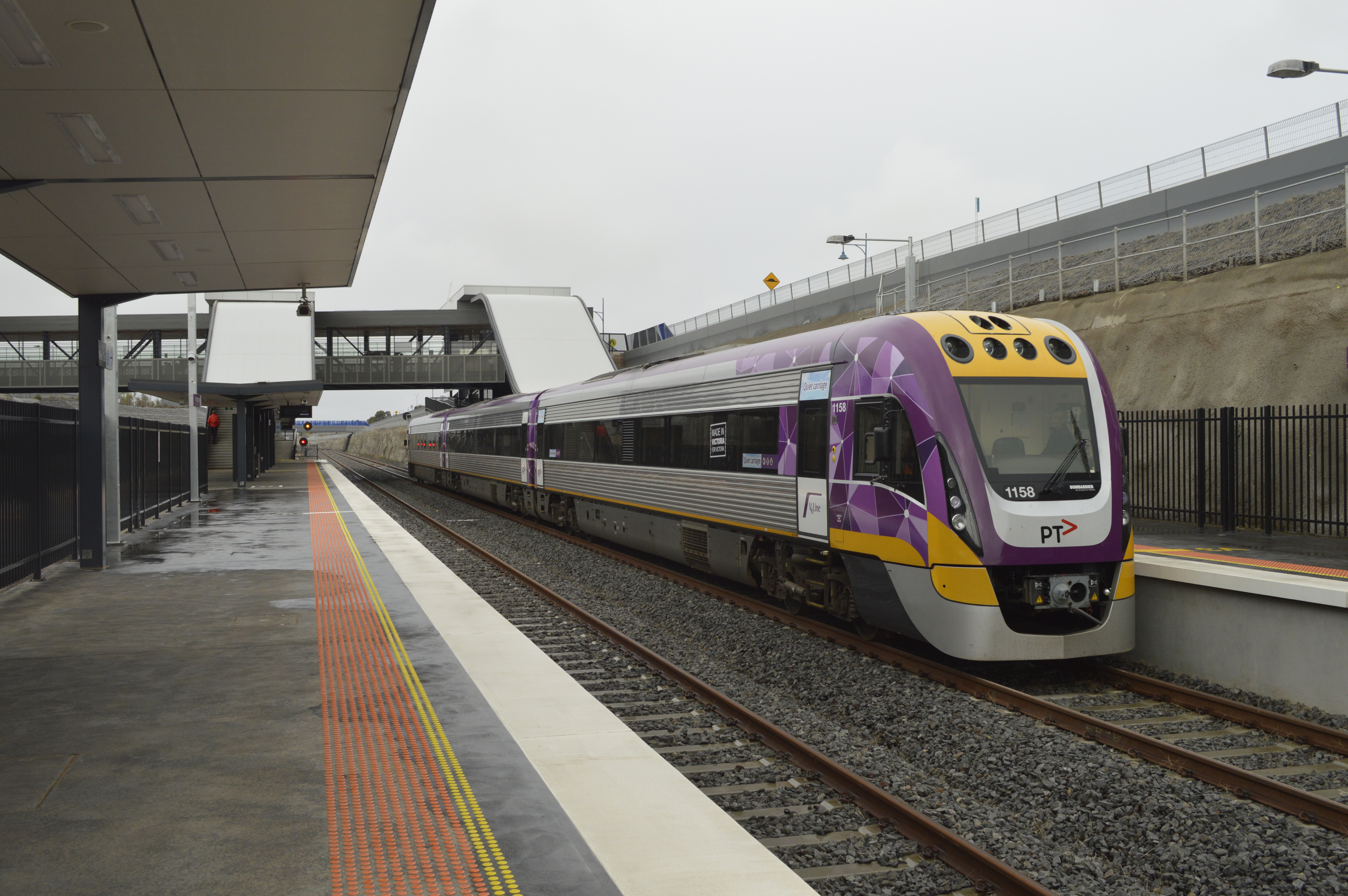
- Wyndham Vale railway station

- Interactive map of Wyndham Vale
- Coordinates: 37.890°S 144.630°E
- Country: Australia
- State: Victoria
- City: Melbourne
- LGA: City of Wyndham
- Location: 31 km (19 mi) from Melbourne; 5 km (3.1 mi) from Werribee; 45 km (28 mi) from Geelong

Government
  - State electorate: Werribee
  - Federal divisions: Lalor; Hawke
- Elevation: 31 m (102 ft)

Population
  - Total: 20,518 (2021 census)
- Postcode: 3024
Suburbs around Wyndham Vale
| Eynesbury | Mount Cottrell | Tarneit |
| Manor Lakes | Wyndham Vale | Werribee |
| Mambourin | Werribee | Werribee |

Wyndham Vale is a suburb in Melbourne, Victoria, Australia, 31 km (19 mi) south-west of Melbourne's Central Business District, one of the fastest growing suburbs of Melbourne, located within the City of Wyndham local government area. Wyndham Vale recorded a population of 20,518 at the 2021 census.

The suburb of Manor Lakes was part of Wyndham Vale until March 2016, when it was officially gazetted as its own suburb.

== History ==
The area in which Wyndham Vale is located was the home of several Aboriginal clans. It formed the boundary between three main language groups: Wadawurrung, Woiwurrung and Boon wurrung. They all lived in the area now known as Wyndham Vale for thousands of years before European settlement.

Following the establishment of Melbourne and the town of Werribee in the early 1800s, Wyndham Vale became a pastoral area with many hectares of land cleared for cattle and other farming. Several large estates were built, such as the 1000-acre Cobbledink Farm, built in 1868. This remained until the late 1990s and early 2000s when the suburban development of the western suburbs of Melbourne began to rapidly expand. Today, Wyndham Vale is the location of significant population growth as new housing is constructed. This growth increased rapidly after June 2012, when Victorian Planning Minister Matthew Guy announced an increase in Melbourne's growth boundary by 5858 hectares, including extending the boundary to encompass area of Wyndham Vale.

== Geography ==
Wyndham Vale is located on the eastern edge of the Newer Volcanics Province, also known as the Western Volcanic Plain. It is relatively flat with areas of significant remnant grassland and other vegetation. Lollipop and Cherry Creeks also run through Wyndham Vale and into Port Phillip Bay.

== Education ==
There are several government and non-government primary and secondary schools in Wyndham Vale:

- Iramoo Primary School
- Riverbend Primary School
- Wyndham Central College
- Christway College, Wyndham
- Wyndham Vale Primary School
- Wyndham Vale South Primary School
- Manor Lakes P-12 College

== Transport ==
=== Road ===
Several major roads service Wyndham Vale, with many having been progressively increased in size as the area becomes more developed. These include Ballan Road, McGrath Road and Bolton Road. As part of the Regional Rail Link in 2015, many new roads and bridges were also constructed. This included Armstrong Road and road bridges over the new railway line at Manor Lakes Boulevard, Greens Road and Black Forest Road.

=== Rail ===
Wyndham Vale train station was opened on 21 June 2015 as part of the Regional Rail Link. It faces Armstrong Road with an additional exit onto Eureka Drive. It has around 600 car parking spaces, bicycle parking and bus connections into surrounding areas. V/Line trains operating to Geelong service the Wyndham Vale station. Electrification of the line up to Wyndham Vale was considered in design of Regional Rail Link, which has been announced by the Victorian Government to be completed by 2031.

=== Bus ===
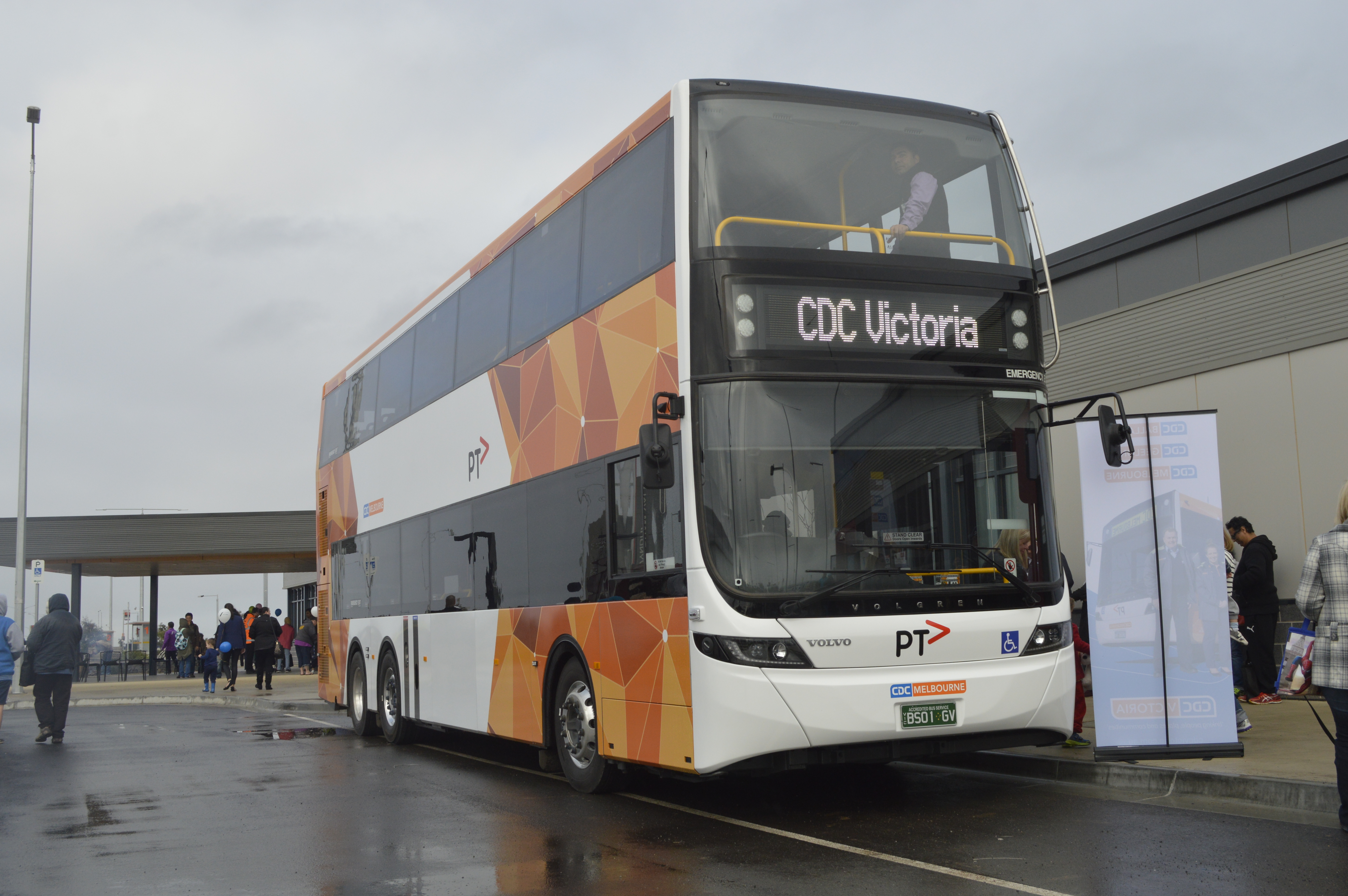
A CDC Melbourne Volvo double-decker bus at Wyndham Vale Station

In 2015, coinciding with the opening of the Regional Rail Link, the Wyndham bus network was extensively upgraded. This became one of the most successful bus network changes in Victoria, with patronage increasing by 45% following the changes. Most bus services service Wyndham Vale Railway Station and provide access to the surrounding suburbs like Werribee and Hoppers Crossing.

== Parks and recreation ==
Wyndham Vale Reserve, located on Honour Avenue, is the home of several sports clubs and facilities, such as the Wyndham Vale Cricket Club.

The Wyndhamvale Football Club, an Australian Rules football team, competes in the Western Region Football League. It has 2 Senior Men's Teams. The Wyndham Vale Falcons Junior Football Club has seven Junior Boys Teams and a Youth Girls Team. Their home-ground was previously also at Wyndham Vale Reserve on Honour Avenue, but has been at Wyndham Vale South Reserve on Black Forest Road (just over the border in Werribee) since 2014.

President's Park is a large area of parkland and recreation reserve on McGrath Road. It consists of several walking and cycling tracks, wetlands, dog off-leash areas and vegetation home to significant numbers of flora and fauna. Several sporting clubs also use facilities in the park, such as the Werribee Hockey Club and Werribee Giants Baseball Club.

Wyndham Vale is located close to the site of many original Mad Max scene locations.
