= Glen Orden Football Club =

Australian rules football club

Names
- Full name: Glen Orden Sports Club Inc
- Nickname: Hawks

Club details
- Founded: 1979; 46 years ago
- Colours: Brown Gold
- Competition: WFNL: Thirds
- Premierships: WFNL (Div 2) (2): 2006; 2013; WFNL (Div 3) (2): 1992; 2019
- Ground: Glen Orden Reserve

Uniforms
Home

The Glen Orden Football Club, sometimes stylised as Glenorden and nicknamed the Hawks, is an Australian rules football club based in the Melbourne suburb of Werribee. The club has competed almost continuously in the Western Football Netball League (WFNL) since 1979.

In addition to football, Glen Orden also has netball teams and cricket teams (the latter known as Glen Orden Thunders).

== History ==
Glen Orden was founded in 1979 and entered the Footscray District Football League (FDFL, later WRFL and WFNL). The club spent its early years in A2 Section as they were initially unable to field senior and reserves teams.

The club won its first senior premiership in Division 3 in 1992. Further success came in the 2000s, with back-to-back Division 2 reserves premierships in 2003 and 2004, as well as both senior and reserves premierships in 2006.

In 2017, Glen Orden withdrew its senior teams from the WRFL amid a player shortage. They returned to fielded senior teams in Division 3 for the 2018 season.

Glen Orden's senior side went into recess again ahead of the 2023 season. The club planned to return to senior competition in 2024, but were unable to find enough players and instead entered the WFNL Thirds competition.
