= Hoppers Crossing Football Club =

Australian rules football club in Victoria

Hoppers Crossing

Names
- Full name: Hoppers Crossing Football Club
- Nickname: Warriors

Club details
- Founded: 1972; 54 years ago
- Colours
- Competition: Western Region Football League (1988-)
- Premierships: 3 (2002, 2004, 2024)
- Ground: Hogans Road Reserve Oval, Hoppers Crossing

Uniforms
Home

Other information
- Official website: hoppersfootyclub.com.au

The Hoppers Crossing Football Club is an Australian rules football club which has competed in the WRFL since 1988. They are based in the Melbourne suburb of Hoppers Crossing.

== History ==
In 1972, the club fielded a senior team in the Western Suburbs FL. In 1981 and 1987 they made the Grand final only to lose both games. They moved across to the Footscray and District FL in 1988 after their previous league closed down. After winning the 1992 Division 2 premiership the club was promoted to Division One where they have remained since. In 2024 Hoppers Crossing won the division 1 premiership defeating local rivals Werribee Districts in a major upset.

== VFL/AFL Players ==
- Nigel Kellett – Western Bulldogs
- Brad Johnson – Western Bulldogs
- Daniel Ward – Melbourne
- Ryan O'Keefe – Sydney
- Judson Clarke – Richmond Football Club

== Honours ==
- Western Region Football League
  - Division One Seniors Premiers (3): 2002, 2004, 2024
  - Division One Seniors Runners Up (4): 2001, 2006, 2016, 2018
  - Division One Reserves Premiers (5): 2006, 2007, 2015, 2016, 2017
  - Division One Reserves Runners Up (1): 2011
  - Division Two Seniors Premiers (1): 1992
  - Division Two Seniors Runners Up (1): 1990
  - Division Two Reserves Premiers (1): 1992
  - Division Two Reserves Runners Up (0): -

== Bibliography ==
- History of the WRFL/FDFL by Kevin Hillier – ISBN 9781863356015
- History of football in Melbourne's north west by John Stoward – ISBN 9780980592924
