= Deer Park Football Club =

Deer Park

Names
- Full name: Deer Park Football Club
- Nickname: Lions

Club details
- Founded: 1925; 101 years ago
- Colours
- Competition: Essendon District Football League (2023-)
- Premierships: 11 (WFNL: 1939, 1940, 1941, 1994, 2013, 2014, 2015, 2016, 2017, 2018, 2019)
- Ground: Deer Park Sports Oval, Deer Park.

Uniforms
Home

Other information
- Official website: deerparkfc.com.au

The Deer Park Football Club is an Australian rules football club competing in the Essendon District Football League as of 2023. It previously competed in the Western Region Football League (WRFL) since 1935. It is based in the Melbourne suburb of Deer Park.

== History ==
When Deer Park was formed in 1925 it spent several years playing in competitions centered on Werribee. In 1935 it entered the FDFL and changed its name. This club was known as ICI after the large chemical firm that operated in the area. After World War II it reformed as Deer Park.

== Premierships ==
- Western Region Football League
  - Division One (11): 1939, 1940, 1941, 1994, 2013, 2014, 2015, 2016, 2017, 2018, 2019
  - Division Two (2): 2009, 2011
- Essendon District Football League
  - Division One (1): 2023

== Bibliography ==
- History of the WRFL/FDFL by Kevin Hillier – ISBN 9781863356015
- History of football in Melbourne's north west by John Stoward – ISBN 9780980592924
