= Caroline Springs Lakers Football Club =

Names
- Full name: Caroline Springs Lakers Football Club
- Nickname(s): Lakers, Springers, Swans

Club details
- Founded: 2002; 24 years ago
- Colours
- Competition: Western Football Netball League (2011-) Essendon District Football League(2025-)
- President: Terry Azzopardi
- Coach: Brian Lake
- Captain(s): Cooper Pepi, Max Tessari
- Premierships: (2) 2016, 2026
- Grounds: Society 1056 Oval, Caroline Springs.
- Society 1056 Oval 2, Caroline Springs.
- Training grounds: Society 1056 Oval, Caroline Springs.
- Society 1056 Oval 2, Caroline Spings.

Uniforms
| Home | Away |

Other information
- Official website: carolinespringsfc.com

The Caroline Springs Football Club, also known as the Lakers, is a local Australian rules football club based in Caroline Springs, an outer suburb of Melbourne, Australia. The club is competing in the Western Football Netball League (WFNL) since 2011. and the Essendon District Football League (EDFL) since 2025. (Only for woman teams Since 2025-) They are based in the Melbourne suburb of Caroline Springs.

== History ==
On 15 May 2002 Mark Penaluna, the General Manager of the WRFL and other officials met with principals of local schools to discuss developing the game of football in the Caroline Springs area. From this meeting it was decided to hold a public interest meeting on 19 June 2002. With such a great turnout, it was obvious that the people wanted a club in Caroline Springs.

A steering committee was formed and met every two weeks from then onwards to incorporate the Caroline Springs Football Club. A relationship was developed with the Williamstown (VFL) & Collingwood to help develop football in the area. The steering committee agreed that the club colours will be those of the two clubs being Black, White, Royal Blue & Gold.

Developers of the Caroline Springs community, Delfin, also agreed to assist financially to help the club with their start-up costs.

The club started fielding sides in the WRFL underage competitions. As the players got older the club started fielding sides in the older age group. Finally in 2011 the Club fielded their first open aged team in the WRFL Division 2 competition. The club won 4 games in its initial year. It won six games in 2012.

== Team song (lyrics) ==
Oh, we're from Caroline Springs,
The mighty Lakers
We're from Caroline Springs
In any weather you will see us with a grin (HEY)
Risking head and shin (HEY)
If we're behind then never mind we'll fight and fight and win
For we're from Caroline Springs
We'll never weaken until the final siren's gone
Like the Lakers of old
We're strong and we're bold
We are the yellow, blue, white and black
We are the Laker boys (or) girls.

Altered From Richmond Football Club

== Bibliography ==
- History of football in Melbourne's north west by John Stoward – ISBN 9780980592924
