= Wyndhamvale Football Club =

Australian rules football club in Victoria

Wyndhamvale

Names
- Full name: Wyndhamvale Football Club
- Nickname: Falcons

Club details
- Founded: 1979; 47 years ago
- Colours
- Competition: Western Region Football League
- Ground: Wyndhamvale Reserve

Uniforms
Home

Other information
- Official website: wyndhamvalefc.com.au

The Wyndhamvale Football Club is an Australian rules football club which compete in the WRFL since 1989. They are based in the Melbourne suburb of Wyndham Vale.

== History ==
In 1985, the club fielded a senior team in the Reserve Division of the Western Suburbs FL. Half way through that season, due to the huge number of player response, a second team was entered in the same competition. The original team played off in the finals that year. In the 1986 season Wyndhamvale fielded teams A3 and A2 senior teams.

Wyndhamvale fielded a Senior team in Geelong & District Football League in 1987 and 1988. The club transferred to the Footscray District FL in 1989. The Club went into recess from 1995 to 1998 and resumed in season 1999 in the Western Region Football League Division 2 in 1999.

== Premierships ==
- Western Region Football League
  - Division Two (1): 2015
  - Division Two Reserves (2): 2014, 2022

== Bibliography ==
- History of the WRFL/FDFL by Kevin Hillier – ISBN 9781863356015
- History of football in Melbourne's north west by John Stoward – ISBN 9780980592924

== Song ==
Sung to the tune of "You're A Grand Old Flag"

We Are From Wyndhamvale
And We Never Fail
We Fight For The Gold And The Green
It’s The Team We Love
From Heavens Above
It’s The Best Team That You’ve Ever Seen
And We Go Out There With A Grin And A Stare
Ready To Give Them Hell Hell Hell
We Won’t Give In
We Play To Win
For The Glory Of The Gold And The Green
