= Albanvale Football Club =

Albanvale

Names
- Full name: Albanvale Football Club
- Nickname: Cobras

Club details
- Founded: 1978; 48 years ago
- Colours
- Competition: Western Region Football League
- Ground: Robert Bruce Reserve, Deer Park

Uniforms
Home

Other information
- Official website: albanvalecobras.com.au

Albanvale Football Club is an Australian rules football club located 18 km west of Melbourne in the suburb of Deer Park. Albanvale is affiliated with the Western Region Football League. The club had a brief stint in the Victorian Amateur Football Association between 1989 and 1991.

Known as the Cobras, the club was established in 1978 by a group of interested parents and youths from the fast-growing new community situated in the corridor between St Albans and Deer Park, who identified a need to create sporting opportunities for the young people of the area.

Albanvale ground location is at Robert Bruce Reserve on the corner of Station and Neale Roads, Deer Park. The oval started off as little more than a rough paddock and the "clubrooms" consisted of a simple tin shed. However, through the commitment of its members, committees and the assistance of the former City of Sunshine, permanent change-rooms which are still used today were constructed and a formal playing surface was prepared.

Albanvale Football Club currently has approximately 260 registered players competing in Under 10, Under 13, Under 15, Under 18, Reserve and Senior grades. Many of the players have had a long association with the club and it is not unusual for players to achieve significant career milestones as 150 or 200 games whilst still playing within the Junior ranks.

The club is competitive at all levels with a number of premiership victories at different Junior levels.

== Club Song ==
Sung to the tune of Row, Row, Row From Ziegfeld Follies

Oh we're from Cobraland
A fighting fury
We're from Cobraland
In any weather you will see us with a grin
Risking head and shin
If we're behind then never mind
We'll fight and fight and win
For we're from Cobraland
We never weaken til the final siren sounds
Like the Cobras of old
We're strong and we're bold
For we're from Cobra
The Blue and the White
Oh We're from Cobraland
