= Parkside Football Club (WFNL) =

Names
- Full name: Parkside Football Club
- Nickname: Magpies
- Motto: "Once a Parksider, Always a Parksider"

Club details
- Founded: 1897; 129 years ago
- Colours
- Competition: WRFL (s. 1931)
- Premierships: 1931, 1933, 1936, 1937, 1948, 1949, 1951, 1957, 1962, 1967, 1981, 1996, 2000, 2003, 2014 (Div 2), 2017 (Div 3), 2023 (Div 2)
- Ground: Merv Hughes Oval, Footscray,.

Uniforms
Home

Other information
- Official website: parksidefc.com.au

The Parkside Football Club is an Australian rules football club which compete in the Western Region Football League since 1931. They are based in the Melbourne suburb of Footscray.

== History ==
"Parkside Football Club" was officially formed in 1897 but prior to that operated under the name “Oblinagil” which was aboriginal for ‘near the park’ or ‘beside the park’. Dr. Anderson was the first President who lived in a residence named “Parkside” in Moore Street, Footscray which was how the club's name originated.

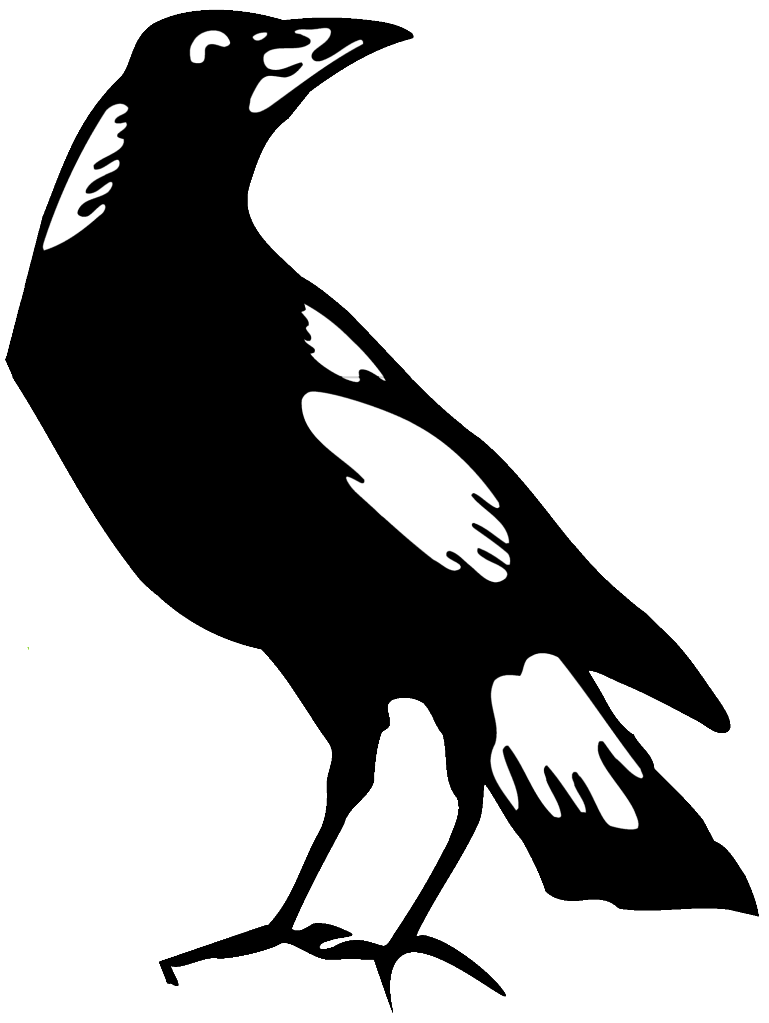
The Magpie emblem, as seen during club's first years.

The club's first home ground was a paddock adjacent to Footscray Park in Ballarat Road called “Newell's Paddock”. In 1921, following a very successful era, the greatest representative of the club became involved with Herb Pascarl running the boundary. In 1923 -24 Parkside moved to the site of its current ground and in 1931 the Footscray District Football League was formed with Herb being one of its founders.

In that initial season Parkside went on to win the premiership. Herb Pascarl is a life member of Parkside Football Club, a life member of the league, has a medal named in his honour presented to the best player in the Division One Seniors Grand Final each year and was awarded in Australian Sports Award in 2000.

The vertical black and white stripes that Parkside are so famous for came about in a rather confusing manner. In 1932 the then Vice President decided to start another club taking over half of the 50 registered Parkside players with him to form Riverside Football Club. The new club was given Parkside's Red, White & Blue colours and so Parkside adopted the vertical Black and White stripes. Riverside defeated Parkside in the 1932 F.D.F.L Grand Final but then disbanded in 1934.

Parkside has a strong history of success in all competitions in which it has been represented with 30 Division One Senior premierships, a number of Reserves and junior premierships and a Division One Women's flag. Parkside has now established itself as one of the oldest and most successful clubs in the Western Region. A long and proud history combined with a positive and exciting future, Parkside Football Club endeavors to work towards achieving success through commitment and dedication by those who share the same passion and direction for our club.

Competitions participated in:

Seniors:

- Pre Footscray District Football League (1897-1930)

From 1897 to 1916 (10 Premierships)

- Metropolitan League (1920-1927) [3 Premierships defeating South Melbourne in 1921, Port Melbourne in 1924 and St.Kilda in 1927]
- Footscray District Football League (1931-1999) [12 Premierships]
- Western Region Football League (2000 to present) [2 Premierships (Div 1) + 2 Premiership (Div 2)]

=== 2014–15 crisis ===
The club after winning the 2014 2nd Division premiership lurched into a club crisis when the board split and most of the players requested a clearance away from the club. The club had no money and there was a real possibility of the club disbanding. A series of high-level meetings and pledges of commitment from stakeholders allowed the club to survive into 2015. The club was allowed time by the WRFL governing body to rebuild the club by demoting it into 3rd division. Players left after not being paid by the club and for the previous season which left them disgruntled as the club was also looking to recruit high end players from other clubs for money they didn't have.

== Premierships ==
- WRFL Division 1 (18): 1931, 1932, 1933, 1934, 1935, 1936, 1937, 1938, 1948, 1949, 1951, 1957, 1962, 1967, 1981, 1996, 2000, 2003
- WRFL Division 2 (2): 2014, 2023
- WRFL Division 3 (1): 2017

== Bibliography ==
- The History Of The Parkside Football Club 1897 To 1997 by Herbert E. Pascarl (1997)
- History of the WRFL/FDFL by Kevin Hillier – ISBN 9781863356015
- History of football in Melbourne's north west by John Stoward – ISBN 9780980592924
