= Manor Lakes, Victoria =

Manor Lakes Melbourne, Victoria
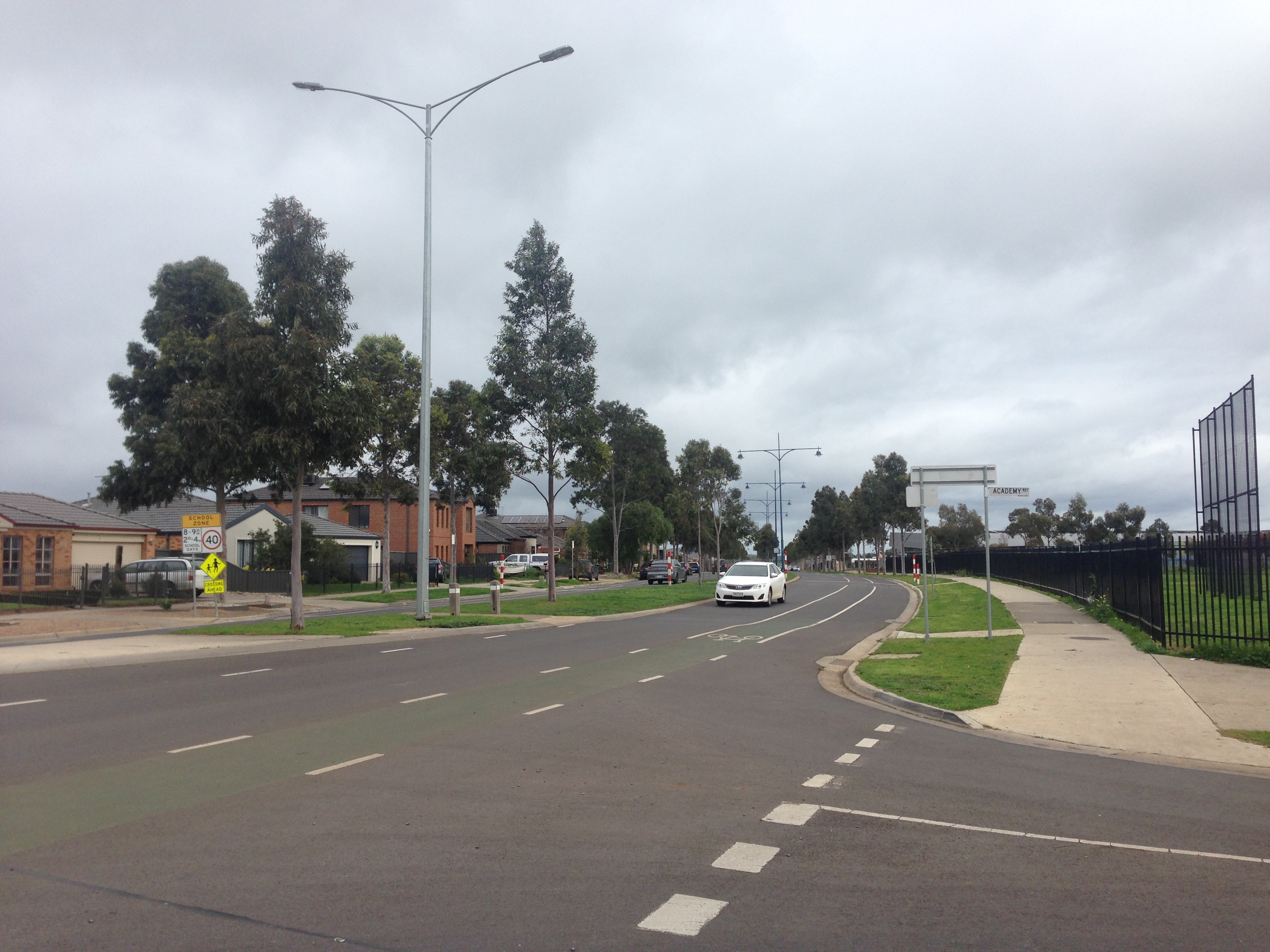
- Manor Lakes Boulevard, Manor Lakes

- Coordinates: 37.873°S 144.582°E
- Population: 12,675 (2021 census)
- Postcode(s): 3024
- Location: 33 km (21 mi) from Melbourne; 8 km (5 mi) from Werribee
- LGA(s): City of Wyndham
- State electorate(s): Werribee
- Federal division(s): Lalor; Hawke
Suburbs around Manor Lakes:
| Eynesbury | Wyndham Vale | Wyndham Vale |
| Quandong | Manor Lakes | Wyndham Vale |
| Mambourin | Mambourin | Wyndham Vale |

Manor Lakes is a suburb in Melbourne, Victoria, Australia, 33 km (21 mi) south-west of Melbourne's Central Business District, located within the City of Wyndham local government area. Manor Lakes recorded a population of 12,675 in the 2021 census.

The suburb was part of Wyndham Vale until March 2016, when it was officially gazetted as its own suburb.

== Education ==
Below are some government and non-government, primary and secondary schools in Manor Lakes and nearby in Wyndham Vale:

- Iramoo Primary School
- Riverbend Primary School
- Wyndham Central College
- Wyndham Christian College
- Wyndham Vale Primary School
- Wyndham Vale South Primary School
- Manor Lakes P-12 College
- Ngarri Primary School
