= Yarraville Seddon Football Club =

Australian rules football club

Yarraville Seddon Eagles

Names
- Full name: Yarraville Seddon Eagles Football Club
- Nickname: Eagles

Club details
- Founded: 2006; 20 years ago
- Colours
- Competition: Western Region Football League (2007–)
- Premierships: 2 (2012, 2019)
- Ground: Yarraville Football Ground, Yarraville.

Uniforms
Home

Other information
- Official website: yseagles.com.au

The Yarraville Seddon Eagles Football Club is an Australian rules football club which has competed in the Western Region Football League since 2007. They are based in the Melbourne suburb of Yarraville. The original Yarraville Football Club, which disbanded in 1984, is not a predecessor club of the Yarraville Seddon Eagles, however the newer club "recognise(s) their achievements".

== History ==
The Kingsville Football Club was a member of the FDFL from 1936. They wore a jumper that was similar to that of Williamstown in the VFL. They had a home ground in Roberts St, Yarraville before moving to the Yarraville Oval in 1990.

In 1996, Kingsville changed its name to the Yarraville Football Club, having started playing at the Yarraville Oval several years earlier. The first game under the Yarraville name saw Yarraville lose to Parkside. However, after that Yarraville would win 15 out of 18 games in 1996 and take first place on the ladder. They made it to the Grand Final but would lose to Parkside. In 1997, Yarraville again took top spot and again took on Parkside in the Grand Final, but this time were able to win the flag. Yarraville's reserves team also won the grand final, beating Parkside as well.

In 1998, Yarraville suffered after losing many of the players who had helped win the flags the previous year and would finish midway through the ladder. In 1999 Yarraville struggled and would only manage 4 wins for the season. They finished last and were relegated to the second division of the WRFL.

In 2000, Yarraville were able to rebuild and had probably the best team since the '97 grand final winning team. The club was determined to get back to division 1 where they felt they rightfully belonged. They won all but one game for the season and often won by margins of 20-30 goals. On 15 July Yarraville kicked 55 goals and 33 behinds against the struggling Brooklyn. Yarraville defeated Glenorden in the Grand final. The win put Yarraville back into 1st division for the following season.

From 2001 to 2006 Yarraville maintained its spot in 1st division and just missed out on playing finals several times.

During the 2006 season Yarraville began talks about a possible merger with the Seddon Football Club. Seddon had dropped out of the senior competition after 10 games due to poor performance. The merger was eventually agreed upon. The Yarraville Football Club played its final game at the end of the 2006 season when they defeated St Albans. Although this marked the end of the Yarraville Football Club, 2007 marked the beginning of the Yarraville Seddon Eagles Football Club, a combination of the Yarraville FC, Seddon FC and Yarraville Juniors.

== Premierships ==
Below there is a list of the premierships won by the Yarraville Seddon Eagles and its predecessors, Yarraville FC (previously named Kingsville FC) and Seddon FC. Seddon played in the FDFL from 1935 until its merger in 2006. It wore the jumper similar to Hawthorn

- Western Region Football League
  - Division One (8): 1943, 1964, 1997, (Note: Premiers by Kingsville FC / Yarraville FC) 1950, 1953, 1976, 1991, 1992 (Note: Premiers by Seddon FC)
  - Division Two (8): 1942, 1971, 1977, 2000, (Note: Premiers by Kingsville FC / Yarraville FC), 1998, 2001, 2012, 2019

== Bibliography ==
- History of the WRFL/FDFL by Kevin Hillier – ISBN 9781863356015
- History of football in Melbourne's north west by John Stoward – ISBN 9780980592924
