= St Albans Football Club (EDFL) =

St Albans

Names
- Full name: St Albans Football Club
- Nickname(s): Saints

Club details
- Founded: 1947; 78 years ago
- Colours
- Competition: Essendon District Football League
- President: Bekim Muhtari
- Coach: Zammy Muhtari
- Captain(s): Jake Galea
- Ground(s): Kings Park Reserve
- Errington Reserve
- Delahey Reserve

Uniforms
Home

Other information
- Official website: stalbansfc.com.au

The St Albans Football Club is an Australian rules football club based at Kings Park Reserve in Kings Park, a north-western suburb of Melbourne.

Founded in 1947, the club participated in the Western Region Football League until 2022, after which the club moved to the Essendon District Football League. To date, St Albans has won five Division One Premierships, the most recent being in 2001. They have also won 1 Division 2 Premiership.

St Albans currently has 7 Junior teams, ranging from Under 10s to Under 18s, two open age Female teams and two Senior Men's teams.

== History ==
A public meeting was called to be held at the St Albans Fire Station in September 1946. The reason for this meeting was to form a Football Club, that is the St Albans Football Club as we know it today. Twenty-six people attended this meeting and Mr W E Perrett was elected as President for the first year. Moreover, Mr J Douglas and Mr S Taylor were appointed secretary and coach respectively. The club was to be located at Errington Reserve. Mr S Taylor and Mr A McPherson were elected as captain and vice captain respectively.

In March, St Albans FC was officially accepted into the Western Region Football League, which was at the time known as the Footscray District Football League. Competitive matches were to start on the 26th of the following month. Nevertheless, before the commencement of the league, St Albans opted to play a practice match against ICI from Deer Park, its first ever match.

In December 2022 the club transitioned across to the Essendon District Football League and will compete in the 2023 season in Division One.

== Honours ==
=== Club ===
- Western Region Football League
  - Division One (5): 1966, 1969, 1988, 1989, 2001
  - Division Two (1): 1997

=== Individual ===
==== Best & Fairest ====
1947 R Priest
1949 S Taylor/A McPherson
1950 K Priest
1951 D McPherson
1958 G Haynes
1959 G Haynes
1960 G Haynes
1961 W Dawidowicz
1962 T McIntyre
1963 W Dawidowicz
1964 G Haynes
1965 F Uscinas
1966 I Sharp
1967 T Munday
1968 R Toby
1969 G Cameron
1970 F Van Leeuwen
1971 G Cameron
1972 J Stanecki
1973 N Farrell
1974 R Szwaj
1975 A Tansis
1976 R Szwaj
1977 R Bradley
1978 J Blyth
1979 J Blyth
1980 R Peterson
1981 J Blyth
1982 R Peterson
1983 R Peterson
1984 R Peterson
1985 L Foreman
1986 L Foreman
1987 D Templar
1988 S McGhie
1989 S McGhie
1990 S Haynes
1991 A Walsh
1992 P Mala
1993 S Millo
1994 J Fitzpatrick
1995 S Millo
1996 M Antonowicz
1997 A Fennessy
1998 M Antonowicz
1999 M Antonowicz
2000 J Skinner
2001 J Fitzpatrick
2002 A Ibrahim
2003 A Szwadiak
2004 D McFerran
2005 S Arena
2006 S Arena
2007 M Agius
2008 B Hollow
2009 T Jenkins
2010 T Jenkins
2011 S Hoare
2012 B Taylor
2013 L Baddeley
2014 J West
2015 M Quigley
2016 T Jenkins
2017 T Jenkins
2018 T Donoghue
2019 D Kovacevic

==== 300 Game Players ====
Joe Maziarz
Rod Toby
Paul Shanley
Jeff Parker
Rod Brown
Michael Portelli
Robert Paterson
Wayne Duffy
Joe Capelli
Corey Bissett
Mark Antonowicz
Daniel McFerran
Jason Fitzpatrick
David Pettenon
Simon Millo
Aaron Edwards
Travis Edwards
Mark Magor
Jim Vickens
Joe Murphy
Zammy Muhtari
Brian O'Donovan
Dale Marshall
Adam Szwadiak
Colin Baulch
Rudi Jakavicius
Peter Trimboli
Craig Psaila

== Team of the Century ==
St Albans Team of the Century
| B: | R Priest | R Jimenez | M McBean |
| HB: | S Millo | J Maziarz | J Fitzpatrick |
| C: | J Blythe | C Missen | L Dickson |
| HF: | P Mala | T Munday | D Stephens |
| F: | M Antonowicz | A Priest | D Dawidowicz |
| Foll: | R Peterson | S McGhie (Captain) | G Haynes |
| Int: | S Taylor | B Szwaj | G Cameron |
| Int: | S Haynes | | |
| Coach: | G Haynes | | |
