= Sunshine Football Club (WRFL) =

Sunshine

Names
- Full name: Sunshine Football Club
- Nickname: Kangaroos

Club details
- Founded: 1959; 66 years ago
- Colours
- Competition: Western Football Netball League
- Premierships: YCW (3): 1966, 1969, 1976 WFNL (1):2024
- Ground: Kinder Smith Reserve, Braybrook,

Uniforms
Home

Other information
- Official website: sunshinekangaroos.com.au

The Sunshine Football Club, nicknamed Kangaroos, is an Australian rules football club which compete in the Western Football Netball League (Formally known as the Western Region Football League) since 1978. They are based in the Melbourne suburb of Braybrook.

== History ==
Formed as the Sunshine YCW Football Club in 1959 as a junior club. They joined the "YCW National Football Association" playing its first senior game was in 1963. After winning three premierships in the YCW NFA, the club transferred to the Footscray Districts Football League in 1978.

After losing consecutive Grand Finals in 1994 and 1995 in A2 grade the club was promoted to A1 grade (division 1) in 1996 and have remained in the top level of the competition ever since.

At the end of the 2000 season with the change in the League's name the club followed suit by dropping the YCW from its title.

== Competitions and Premierships ==
- YCW National Football Association (1963-1977)
  - 1966 (B grade), 1969 (B grade), 1976 (A grade)
- Footscray District Football League (1978-1999)
  - Nil
- Western Football Netball League (2000-)
  - 2024

== VFL/AFL players ==
- David Darcy - Footscray

== Book ==
- History of the WRFL/FDFL – Kevin Hillier - - ISBN 9781863356015
- History of football in Melbourne's north west - John Stoward - ISBN 9780980592924
