= 1939 VFA season =

61st season of the Victorian Football Association

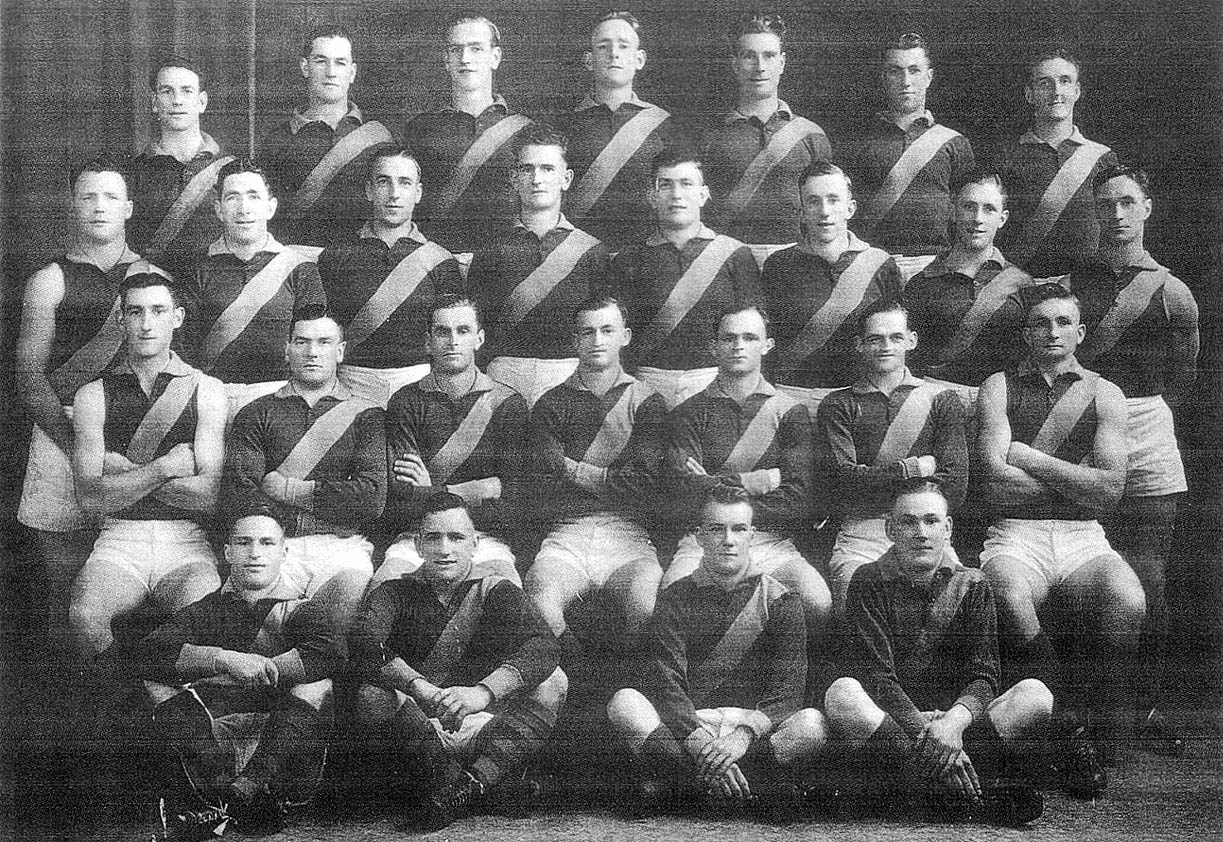
- Williamstown – 1939 VFA premiers

Overview
- Date: 15 April – 7 October 1939
- Teams: 12
- Premiers: Williamstown; 3rd premiership
- Runners-up: Brunswick; 7th runners-up result
- Minor premiers: Prahran; 2nd minor premiership
- Recorder Cup: Pat Hartnett (Brighton – 5 votes)
- VFA Medal: Arthur Cutting (Williamstown – 32½ votes)
- Leading goalkicker: George Hawkins (Prahran – 164 goals)

Attendance
- Matches played: 124
- Total attendance: 591,050
- Highest (finals): 47,098 (Grand Final, Brunswick vs Williamstown)

The 1939 VFA season was the 61st season of the Victorian Football Association (VFA).

Williamstown won the premiership for the third time, defeating Brunswick by nine points in the 1939 VFA Grand Final. The result was a strong revival for Williamstown, which had won the wooden spoon in 1938.

== Home-and-away season ==
The home-and-home season was played over twenty matches, a large increase from 1938 when sixteen matches were played, before the top four clubs contested a finals series under the Page–McIntyre system to determine the premiers for the season. This pushed the end of the season into October, the weekend after the Victorian Football League Grand Final. It became standard for the VFA Grand Final to be scheduled for the weekend after the VFL Grand Final until 1963.

== Ladder ==
Pos	Team	Pld	W	L	D	PF	PA	PP	Pts
1	Prahran	20	15	5	0	2427	1849	131.3	60
2	Brunswick	20	15	5	0	2263	1751	129.2	60
3	Northcote	20	14	6	0	1918	1549	123.8	56
4	Williamstown (P)	20	14	6	0	2173	1773	122.6	56
5	Camberwell	20	13	7	0	2361	2045	115.5	52
6	Brighton	20	11	9	0	2087	1987	105.0	44
7	Coburg	20	10	10	0	2084	1958	106.4	40
8	Preston	20	9	11	0	1810	1854	97.6	36
9	Yarraville	20	7	13	0	1888	2462	76.7	28
10	Sandringham	20	6	14	0	1995	2131	93.6	24
11	Port Melbourne	20	5	15	0	1715	2293	74.8	20
12	Oakleigh	20	1	19	0	1728	2797	61.8	4

Rules for classification: 1) points; 2) percentage; 3) number of points for.
(P) Premiers

== Finals ==
=== Semi-finals ===
	Semi-finals
Saturday, 16 September	Northcote 10.14 (74)	def. by	Williamstown 11.14 (80)	Toorak Park (crowd: 11,000)
Saturday, 23 September	Prahran 16.13 (109)	def. by	Brunswick 16.17 (113)	Toorak Park (crowd: 10,000)

=== Preliminary final ===
	Preliminary final
Saturday, 30 September	Prahran 16.18 (114)	def. by	Williamstown 17.19 (121)	Toorak Park (crowd: 14,000)

=== Grand Final ===
1939 VFA Grand Final
Saturday, 7 October	Brunswick	def. by	Williamstown	Melbourne Cricket Ground (crowd: 47,098)
4.5 (29); 8.7 (55); 11.11 (77); 14.11 (95)	Q1; Q2; Q3; Final	3.2 (20); 4.9 (33); 12.15 (87); 14.20 (104)
Crawford 4, McInnes 4, Jones 3, Dowling, McGrath, McKay	Goals	Vallence 5, Jamieson 2, Paterson 2, Thomas 2, McTaggart, Menzies, Quinn

== Awards ==
- George Hawkins (Prahran) was the leading goalkicker for the season, kicking 150 goals in the home-and-home season and 164 goals overall. Hawkins broke Frank Seymour's Association record of 130 goals in a season; he also exceeded Western Australian forward George Doig's national record of 152 goals in a season, although it was not recognised as a national record because the Association was not playing under ANFC rules at the time.
- In the parallel Association best and fairest awards:
  - Pat Hartnett (Brighton) won the Recorder Cup, polling five votes. Laurie Nash (Camberwell), Arthur Cutting (Williamstown), George Hawkins (Prahran) and Cec Ruddell (Northcote) finished equal second with four votes apiece.
  - The Association Medal was won for the second straight year by Arthur Cutting (Williamstown), who polled 32½ votes. Laurie Nash (Camberwell) finished second with 30 votes, and Pat Hartnett (Brighton) finished third with 26 votes.
- Coburg won the seconds premiership. Coburg 11.22 (88) defeated Port Melbourne 7.7 (49) in the Grand Final, played as a curtain raiser to the seniors Grand Final on Saturday 7 October at the Melbourne Cricket Ground.

== Notable events ==
- All matches on 26 August were postponed by one week due to heavy rain on the Friday night, coupled with persistent waterlogging throughout winter, making many grounds unplayable.
- On 2 September, Brunswick 37.16 (238) defeated Oakleigh 7.10 (52) by 186 points. The score set a new record for the highest score ever in an Association match, beating Hawthorn's record of 30.31 (211) set in 1922.
- With the high scores from the throw pass, five separate players – Hawkins, Harry Vallence (Williamstown), Harold Jones (Brunswick), Lance Collins (Coburg) and Laurie Nash (Camberwell) – kicked more than 100 goals for the season.
- The fact that the Association had moved the end of the season to the week after the VFL grand final, coupled with the postponement of 26 August's matches, resulted in a scheduling clash between the football finals and preparations for the district cricket season. The Association scheduled the preliminary final for Toorak Park, where most finals had been held for the previous four seasons; but, the Prahran Cricket Club, which held the lease, refused to allow the match to be played, as it wanted to top-dress the ground so that it was ready for the start of the cricket season on 7 October; the club was concerned that it would be excluded from the Victorian Cricket Association if the ground was not ready. The Prahran City Council, which leased the ground to the cricket club, preferred to see the high-drawing football final played on the ground, and overruled the cricket club to ensure that the game was played at Toorak Park. Both sides believed that the terms of the lease put them in the legal right. In the week leading up to the final, the cricket club's curator began to harrow the field, and was removed – allegedly physically – by representatives of the council. The cricket club took the council to court to seek an injunction against the preliminary final being played at Toorak Park, but it was not granted and the match went ahead as scheduled.
- In the preliminary final, Williamstown opened a 43-point advantage early in the final quarter, before Prahran kicked eight of the next nine goals over the next twelve minutes to bring the margin back to one point. In the final minutes, Hawkins kicked a goal (his fifth for the quarter) to put Prahran ahead, before Williamstown goals in the final minute to Vallence and Jamieson restored the lead and a seven-point victory.
- The grand final attracted an all-time Association record attendance of 47,098, despite drizzly weather. The attendance broke the record set in the 1908 Grand Final.
- On Saturday 14 October, Coburg played an exhibition match against a combined team from Tasmania's North Western Football Association – a competition which had adopted the Association's throw-pass rule – at Devonport Oval in front of a large crowd. Coburg 21.23 (149) defeated the NWFA 7.8 (50).

== See also ==
- List of VFA/VFL Premiers
