= Bill Spokes =

Australian rules footballer (1912–1985)

Personal information
- Full name: William Ambrose Spokes
- Born: 13 November 1912; Essendon, Victoria
- Died: 31 October 1985 (aged 72); Northcote, Victoria
- Original team: Preston (VFA)
- Height: 5 ft 11 in (180 cm)
- Weight: 13 st 10 lb (87 kg)

Playing career^{1}
Years	Club	Games (Goals)
1930–32	Fitzroy Districts (SDL)	
1933–34	Preston (VFA)	9 (2)
1934–35	Brunswick (VFA)	22 (0)
1936–37	Fitzroy Districts (SDL)	
1938	Preston (VFA)	10 (2)
1939–40	Williamstown (VFA)	29 (15)
1941	Preston (VFA)	3 (1)
1943–44	Fitzroy (VFL)	5 (3)
1945	Preston (VFA)	1 (0)
- ^{1} Playing statistics correct to the end of 1945.

William Ambrose Spokes (13 November 1912 – 31 October 1985) was an Australian rules footballer who played with Fitzroy in the Victorian Football League (VFL), and with Preston, Brunswick, and Williamstown in the Victorian Football Association (VFA).

== Family ==
The son of Alfred George Parsonage (1885–1919), and Edith Carol Parsonage (1889–1968), née Arrowsmith, William Ambrose Parsonage was born at Essendon, Victoria on 13 November 1912. From the time of his (widowed) mother's marriage to William Frederick Spokes (1893–1966) in 1920 he assumed the family name of Spokes.

He married Dorothy Jean Warren (1914–1974) in 1935. They had two children.

== Football ==
His somewhat complex career as an Australian rules footballer lasted, at least, for 16 seasons (1930 to 1945).

He was playing for North Fitzroy (Note: As of 1936, the same club was known as the Fitzroy District Football Club, in the Sub-District League.) in the Sub-District League in 1930 and 1931. He played in one game for Collingwood Seconds in 1932, and then returned to North Fitzroy. He was cleared from "Collingwood" to Preston, by the VFL Second Eighteens, on 23 May 1933; and from "North Fitzroy" to Preston, by the VFL Permit Committee, on 24 May 1933.

He played in 9 games for Preston in 1933 and 1934; and, on 5 June 1934, he was cleared from Preston to Brunswick. He played in 22 games for Brunswick in 1934 and 1935.

In 1936 and 1937 he was captain-coach of Fitzroy Districts. On 13 April 1938 he was cleared from Fitzroy District (which had disbanded) to Preston. He played 10 games for Preston in 1938; and, then, on 19 April 1939, was cleared from Preston to "Richmond Amateurs", only to be cleared from Preston to Williamstown on 15 June 1939. He played 29 games (15 goals) for Williamstown in 1939 and 1940, including the winning 1939 Grand Final team and the losing 1940 Preliminary Final.

In April 1941, he was cleared from Williamstown to Geelong; and, then in May 1941, from Williamstown to Preston. He played in three matches for Preston in 1941. (Note: He was, in fact, selected five times but only played three times)

Due the various pressures of World War II, there was no VFA competition in 1942, 1943, or 1944. (Note: Although the senior competition remained in recess, the Association did resume its seconds [reserves] competition in 1944 with restrictions on participation by former senior players) On 14 April 1945, in the first round of the 1945 VFA season, he played for Preston, against Northcote, at the Preston City Oval. Four days later, the VFL granted him a clearance to Fitzroy from Preston, and Fitzroy listed him as an "old player" in its final training list for 1945. He played in the Fitzroy Seconds for the entire 1945 VFL season, including Fitzroy's 9.3 (57) to 9.16 (70) Grand Final loss to Footscray.

== Boxing ==
He was also a middleweight/light heavyweight boxer of some note. Including bouts while he was serving with the RAAF, (Note: Champion woodchopper Jack O'Toole was also the undefeated Victoria Police Heavyweight Boxing Champion from 1942 to 1955) Spokes fought in 19 professional bouts between 1933 and 1944, with 9 wins (3 by OK), 6 losses (2 by KO), and 4 draws.

== Military service ==
He served in the RAAF from January 1944 to July 1946; and, while doing so, he also continued to play football, as well as competing as a boxer.

== Death ==
He died in Northcote, Victoria on 31 October 1985.
