= List of VFA/VFL premiers =

This page is a complete chronological listing of the premiers of the Australian rules football competition known as the Victorian Football Association until 1995 and as the Victorian Football League since 1996. The Victorian Football Association was the top Victorian competition in Australian rules football from 1877 until 1896, and has been the second-tier Victorian competition since.

Each year, the premiership is awarded to the club which wins the VFL Grand Final. The grand final has been an annual tradition in its current format since 1933, and some form of grand final has been scheduled in each season since 1903 VFA season. As of 2026, there have been 117 VFA/VFL grand finals held (including the 1958 grand final replay and excluding the two pre-1903 playoff matches).

== List of premiers ==
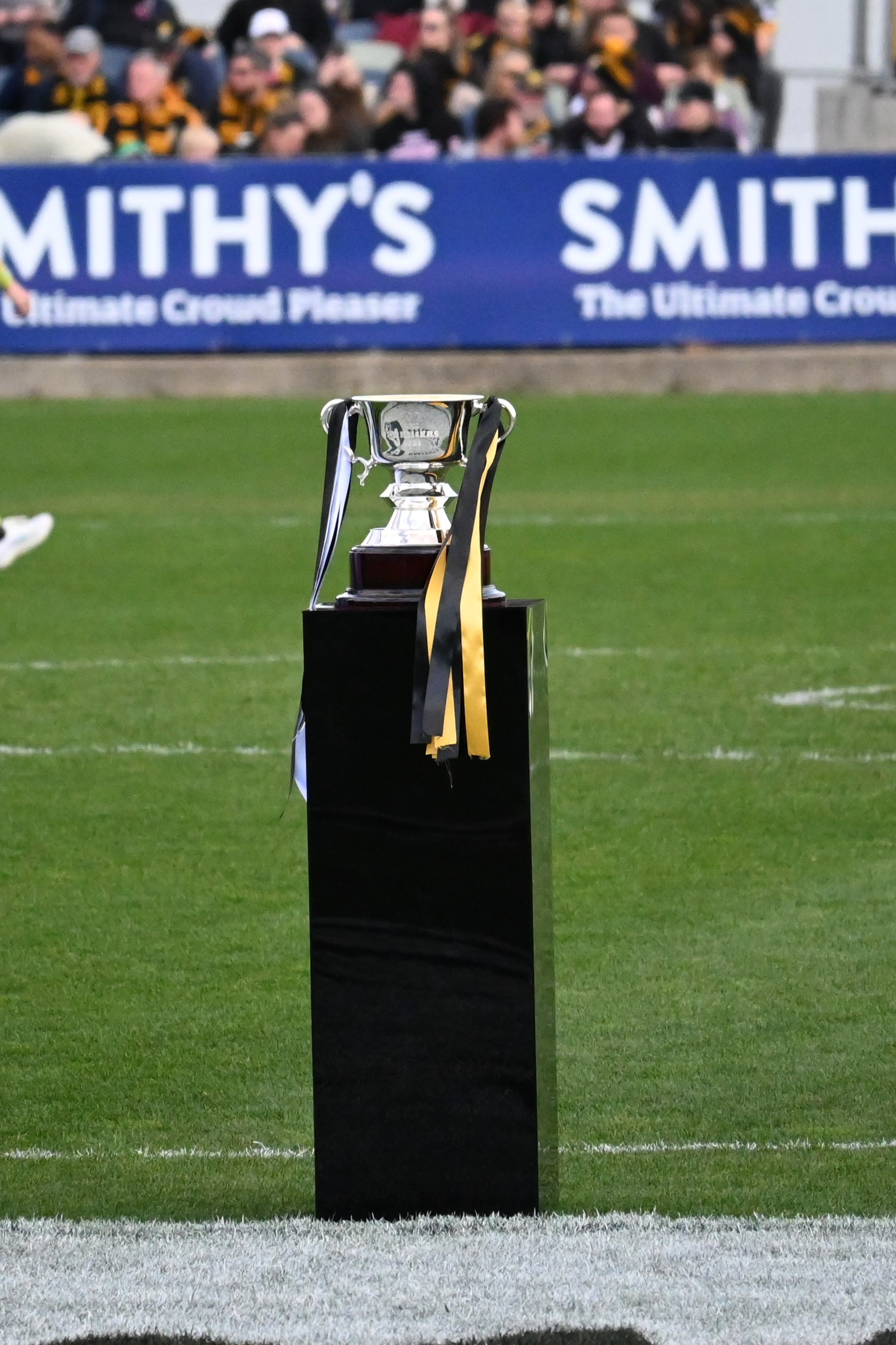
The VFL Premiership Cup

=== Premiership systems ===
Premierships are recognised for all seasons of VFA/VFL competition. Several different methods have existed to determine the premiers:

- From 1877 until 1887, the premiership was a title given to the best performing team, determined largely by press consensus. These premierships, as well as premierships between 1870 and 1876 decided in the same manner prior to the foundation of the VFA, were at the time an informal title, but have since been considered official.
- In 1888, the premiership became a formal competition controlled by the VFA. From 1888 until 1902, the premiership was determined based on win–loss record, with a playoff match played only in the event of teams finishing with equal records
- From 1903 until 1932, the Argus system was in place, and the circumstances of the Grand Final could vary; in those years, the minor premiers had the right to challenge the winner of the finals series for the premiership, so the Grand Finals of this era are a mixture of challenge matches and non-challenge matches which would have been followed by challenge matches had the minor premier been defeated.
- Since 1933, the premiership has been determined by a conventional Grand Final at the end of a finals series.

=== VFA/VFL premiers ===
Premiership decided by a conventional grand final or playoff match, in which neither team had any right to challenge
Premiership decided by a grand final replay, after the scheduled grand final was drawn
Premiership decided by a challenge final under the Argus system
Premiership decided without the need for a challenge final under the Argus system; in these cases, had the runners-up won the match, a rematch would have been played the following weekend
Premiership decided by full season win–loss record
Premiership decided by press consensus

Year	Premiers	Runners-up	Score	Venue	Crowd	Date	Report
1877	Carlton	Melbourne					
1878	Geelong	Melbourne (2)	5.12 d. 1.4 (Note: The 1878 end-of-season playoff match between top metropolitan team Melbourne and undefeated provincial team Geelong was understood to be a premiership-deciding game, but had no official status as such.)	Melbourne Cricket Ground	7,500	5 October 1878	
1879	Geelong (2)	Carlton					
1880	Geelong (3)	South Melbourne					
1881	South Melbourne	Geelong					
1882	Geelong (4)	Essendon					
1883	Geelong (5)	South Melbourne (2)					
1884	Geelong (6)	Essendon (2)					
1885	South Melbourne (2)	Essendon (3)					
1886	Geelong (7)	South Melbourne (3)					
1887	Carlton (2)	Geelong (2)					
Victorian Football Association premiership officially established
1888	South Melbourne (3)	Geelong (3)					
1889	South Melbourne (4)	Carlton (2)					
1890	South Melbourne (5)	Carlton (3)					
1891	Essendon	Carlton (4)					
1892	Essendon (2)	Fitzroy					
1893	Essendon (3)	Melbourne (3)					
1894	Essendon (4)	Melbourne (4)					
1895	Fitzroy	Collingwood; Geelong (4); Melbourne (5)					
1896	Collingwood	South Melbourne (4)	6.9 d. 5.10	East Melbourne Cricket Ground	12,000	3 October 1896	
Victorian Football League (now Australian Football League) established
1897	Port Melbourne	North Melbourne					
1898	Footscray	North Melbourne (2)					
1899	Footscray (2)	North Melbourne (3)					
1900	Footscray (3)	Williamstown					
1901	Port Melbourne (2)	Richmond					
1902	Richmond	Port Melbourne					
1903	North Melbourne	Richmond (2)	7.6 (48) d. 3.9 (27)	East Melbourne Cricket Ground	19,000	19 September 1903	
1904	North Melbourne (2)	Richmond (3)	Forfeited by Richmond	East Melbourne Cricket Ground	N/A	1 October 1904	
1905	Richmond (2)	North Melbourne (4)	9.7 (61) d. 5.6 (36)	East Melbourne Cricket Ground	17,500	7 October 1905	
1906	West Melbourne	Footscray	7.8 (50) d. 5.9 (39)	East Melbourne Cricket Ground	20,000	29 September 1906	
1907	Williamstown	West Melbourne	7.10 (52) d. 3.16 (24)	East Melbourne Cricket Ground	25,000	28 September 1907	
1908	Footscray (4)	Brunswick	9.10 (64) d. 6.4 (40)	Melbourne Cricket Ground	40,000	31 August 1908	
1909	Brunswick	Prahran	10.12 (72) d. 8.7 (55)	North Melbourne Recreation Reserve	20,000	25 September 1909	
1910	North Melbourne (3)	Brunswick (2)	9.14 (68) d. 5.9 (39)	North Melbourne Recreation Reserve	25,000	8 October 1910	
1911	Essendon (A.)	Brunswick (3)	4.10 (34) d. 3.8 (26)	North Melbourne Recreation Reserve	30,000	23 September 1911	
1912	Essendon (A.) (2)	Footscray (2)	9.8 (62) d. 5.11 (41)	North Melbourne Recreation Reserve	25,000	28 September 1912	
1913	Footscray (5)	North Melbourne (5)	10.14 (74) d. 11.7 (73)	East Melbourne Cricket Ground	20,000	6 September 1913	
1914	North Melbourne (4)	Footscray (3)	12.14 (86) d. 7.9 (51)	East Melbourne Cricket Ground	10,000	22 August 1914	
1915	North Melbourne (5)	Brunswick (4)	11.10 (76) d. 3.10 (28)	North Melbourne Recreation Reserve	8,000	7 August 1915	
1916	Season not contested due to World War I						
1917	Season not contested due to World War I						
1918	North Melbourne (6)	Prahran (2)	18.13 (121) d. 3.10 (28)	North Melbourne Recreation Reserve	7,000	10 August 1918	
1919	Footscray (6)	North Melbourne (6)	8.17 (65) d. 6.7 (43)	East Melbourne Cricket Ground	20,000	27 September 1919	
1920	Footscray (7)	Brunswick (5)	10.9 (69) d. 8.18 (66)	East Melbourne Cricket Ground	18,000	9 October 1920	
1921	Williamstown (2)	Footscray (4)	8.9 (57) d. 5.9 (39)	Fitzroy Cricket Ground	20,000	22 October 1921	
1922	Port Melbourne (3)	Footscray (5)	9.6 (60) d. 8.10 (58)	North Melbourne Recreation Reserve	20,000	23 September 1922	
1923	Footscray (8)	Port Melbourne (2)	7.10 (52) d. 5.8 (38)	North Melbourne Recreation Reserve	18,000	29 September 1923	
1924	Footscray (9)	Williamstown (2)	11.11 (77) d. 3.4 (22)	North Melbourne Recreation Reserve	15,000	20 September 1924	
1925	Brunswick (2)	Port Melbourne (3)	10.9 (69) d. 7.11 (53)	Motordrome	15,000	29 August 1925	
1926	Coburg	Brighton	12.9 (81) d. 9.11 (65)	Motordrome	15,000	18 September 1926	
1927	Coburg (2)	Brighton (2)	19.10 (124) d. 13.12 (90)	Motordrome	20,000	15 October 1927	
1928	Coburg (3)	Port Melbourne (4)	17.12 (114) d. 16.11 (107)	Brunswick Cricket Ground	10.854	8 September 1928	
1929	Northcote	Port Melbourne (5)	15.21 (111) d. 10.9 (69)	Melbourne Cricket Ground	17,304	12 October 1929	
1930	Oakleigh	Northcote	9.6 (60) d. 7.9 (51)	North Melbourne Recreation Reserve	8,000	27 September 1924	
1931	Oakleigh (2)	Northcote (2)	10.14 (74) d. 11.5 (71)	North Port Oval	10,000	26 September 1931	
1932	Northcote (2)	Coburg	13.11 (89) d. 8.15 (63)	Coburg Cricket Ground	9,000	24 September 1932	
1933	Northcote (3)	Coburg (2)	11.20 (86) d. 9.16 (70)	Olympic Park	12,000	7 October 1933	
1934	Northcote (4)	Coburg (3)	19.16 (130) d. 10.9 (69)	Showgrounds	2,300	6 October 1934	
1935	Yarraville	Camberwell	10.10 (70) d. 8.13 (61)	Toorak Park	14,600	7 September 1935	
1936	Northcote (5)	Prahran (3)	19.6 (120) d. 15.15 (105)	Toorak Park	12,000	12 September 1936	
1937	Prahran	Brunswick (6)	12.13 (85) d. 11.17 (83)	Toorak Park	9,000	4 September 1937	
Beginning of throw-pass era
1938	Brunswick (3)	Brighton (3)	19.17 (131) d. 14.14 (98)	Toorak Park	20,000	20 August 1938	
1939	Williamstown (3)	Brunswick (7)	14.20 (104) d. 14.11 (95)	Melbourne Cricket Ground	47,098	7 October 1939	
1940	Port Melbourne (4)	Prahran (4)	23.22 (160) d. 17.11 (113)	Melbourne Cricket Ground	30,882	5 October 1940	
1941	Port Melbourne (5)	Coburg (4)	15.18 (108) d. 11.23 (89)	Melbourne Cricket Ground	36,289	4 October 1941	
1942	Season not contested due to World War II						
1943	Season not contested due to World War II						
1944	Season not contested due to World War II						
1945	Williamstown (4)	Port Melbourne (6)	16.21 (117) d. 10.20 (80)	St Kilda Cricket Ground	39,000	6 October 1945	
1946	Sandringham	Camberwell (2)	14.15 (99) d. 13.14 (92)	St Kilda Cricket Ground	30,000	5 October 1946	
1947	Port Melbourne (6)	Sandringham	15.13 (103) d. 11.8 (74)	St Kilda Cricket Ground	24,000	4 October 1947	
1948	Brighton	Williamstown (3)	13.16 (94) d. 13.7 (85)	St Kilda Cricket Ground	18,000	9 October 1948	
1949	Williamstown (5)	Oakleigh	10.5 (65) d. 8.14 (62)	St Kilda Cricket Ground	40,000	1 October 1949	
End of the throw-pass era
1950	Oakleigh (3)	Port Melbourne (7)	13.9 (87) d. 9.14 (68)	St Kilda Cricket Ground	38,000	30 September 1950	
1951	Prahran (2)	Port Melbourne (8)	11.13 (79) d. 10.10 (70)	St Kilda Cricket Ground	32,500	6 October 1951	
1952	Oakleigh (4)	Port Melbourne (9)	11.18 (84) d. 8.15 (63)	St Kilda Cricket Ground	39,500	4 October 1952	
1953	Port Melbourne (7)	Yarraville	21.15 (141) d. 12.9 (81)	St Kilda Cricket Ground	40,000	3 October 1953	
1954	Williamstown (6)	Port Melbourne (10)	11.20 (86) d. 7.12(54)	St Kilda Cricket Ground	30,000	2 October 1954	
1955	Williamstown (7)	Port Melbourne (11)	13.19 (97) d. 13.10 (88)	St Kilda Cricket Ground	30,000	24 September 1955	
1956	Williamstown (8)	Port Melbourne (12)	14.18 (102) d. 10.18 (78)	St Kilda Cricket Ground	28,000	29 September 1956	
1957	Moorabbin	Port Melbourne (13)	15.12 (102) d. 7.20 (62)	St Kilda Cricket Ground	26,000	5 October 1957	
1958	Williamstown	Moorabbin	6.15 (51) drew 7.9 (51)	St Kilda Cricket Ground	20,000	27 September 1958	
1958	Williamstown (9)	Moorabbin	13.18 (96) d. 8.16 (64)	St Kilda Cricket Ground	22,000	4 October 1958	
1959	Williamstown (10)	Coburg (5)	15.21 (111) d. 11.10 (76)	St Kilda Cricket Ground	26,000	10 October 1959	
1960	Oakleigh (5)	Sandringham (2)	18.14 (122) d. 8.14 (62)	St Kilda Cricket Ground	30,000	1 October 1960	
Competition partitioned into two divisions; Division 1 premiers follow
1961	Yarraville (2)	Williamstown (4)	22.7 (139) d. 11.10 (76)	St Kilda Cricket Ground	20,000	30 September 1961	
1962	Sandringham (2)	Moorabbin (2)	14.10 (94) d. 13.15 (93)	St Kilda Cricket Ground	11,000	29 September 1962	
1963	Moorabbin (2)	Sandringham (3)	19.16 (130) d. 9.12 (66)	North Port Oval	15,000	21 September 1963	
1964	Port Melbourne (8)	Williamstown (5)	14.17 (101) d. 10.5 (65)	North Port Oval	26,000	26 September 1964	
1965	Waverley	Port Melbourne (14)	14.13 (97) d. 10.25 (85)	North Port Oval	25,000	26 September 1965	
1966	Port Melbourne (9)	Waverley	13.12 (90) d. 6.11 (47)	St Kilda Cricket Ground	25,000	25 September 1966	
1967	Dandenong	Port Melbourne (15)	16.13 (109) d. 12.12 (84)	Punt Road Oval	25,000	24 September 1967	
1968	Preston	Prahran	15.8 (98) d. 12.12 (84)	Punt Road Oval	18,000	22 September 1968	
1969	Preston (2)	Dandenong	12.11 (83) d. 10.11 (71)	Punt Road Oval	10,000	21 September 1969	
1970	Prahran (3)	Williamstown (6)	17.18 (120) d. 10.10 (70)	St Kilda Cricket Ground	26,000	20 September 1970	
1971	Dandenong (2)	Preston	14.14 (98) d. 13.14 (92)	St Kilda Cricket Ground	14,529	26 September 1971	
1972	Oakleigh (6)	Dandenong (2)	25.17 (167) d. 18.15 (123)	St Kilda Cricket Ground	22,400	24 September 1972	
1973	Prahran (4)	Oakleigh (2)	15.23 (113) d. 10.18 (78)	St Kilda Cricket Ground	21,200	23 September 1973	
1974	Port Melbourne (10)	Oakleigh (3)	22.20 (152) d. 11.17 (83)	St Kilda Cricket Ground	23,936	22 September 1974	
1975	Geelong West	Dandenong (3)	18.13 (121) d. 14.9 (93)	St Kilda Cricket Ground	27,582	21 September 1975	
1976	Port Melbourne (11)	Dandenong (4)	19.18 (132) d. 10.15 (75)	St Kilda Cricket Ground	32,137	19 September 1976	
1977	Port Melbourne (12)	Sandringham (4)	23.19 (157) d. 7.15 (57)	St Kilda Cricket Ground	29,664	25 September 1977	
1978	Prahran (5)	Preston (2)	21.15 (141) d. 17.17 (119)	St Kilda Cricket Ground	29,595	24 September 1978	
1979	Coburg (4)	Geelong West	16.15 (111) d. 14.19 (103)	St Kilda Cricket Ground	17,947	23 September 1979	
1980	Port Melbourne (13)	Coburg (6)	11.15 (81) d. 10.10 (70)	St Kilda Cricket Ground	22,010	21 September 1980	
1981	Port Melbourne (14)	Preston (3)	32.19 (211) d. 15.8 (98)	St Kilda Cricket Ground	20,180	20 September 1981	
1982	Port Melbourne (15)	Preston (4)	21.15 (141) d. 20.14 (134)	St Kilda Cricket Ground	20,732	19 September 1982	
1983	Preston (3)	Geelong West (2)	14.10 (94) d. 12.15 (87)	St Kilda Cricket Ground	14,719	18 September 1983	
1984	Preston (4)	Frankston	19.21 (135) d. 12.9 (81)	St Kilda Cricket Ground	8,664	23 September 1984	
1985	Sandringham (3)	Williamstown (7)	14.16 (100) d. 13.16 (94)	St Kilda Cricket Ground	22,341	22 September 1985	
1986	Williamstown (11)	Coburg (7)	17.9 (111) d. 14.14 (98)	St Kilda Cricket Ground	20,146	21 September 1986	
1987	Springvale	Port Melbourne (16)	14.16 (100) d. 7.20 (62)	St Kilda Cricket Ground	19,620	20 September 1987	
1988	Coburg (5)	Williamstown (8)	16.18 (114) d. 12.15 (87)	Windy Hill	22,034	18 September 1988	
Competition recombined to a single division
1989	Coburg (6)	Williamstown (9)	10.13 (73) d. 7.11 (53)	Windy Hill	23,272	24 September 1989	
1990	Williamstown (12)	Springvale	16.11 (107) d. 15.15 (105)	Princes Park	18,634	30 September 1990	
1991	Dandenong (3)	Werribee	15.15 (105) d. 14.12 (96)	Princes Park	13,565	22 September 1991	
1992	Sandringham (4)	Williamstown (10)	19.16 (130) d. 13.8 (86)	Princes Park	20,847	20 September 1992	
1993	Werribee	Port Melbourne (17)	10.10 (70) d. 4.4 (28)	Princes Park	14,389	19 September 1993	
1994	Sandringham (5)	Box Hill	11.12 (78) d. 10.9 (69)	Victoria Park	13,168	25 September 1994	
1995	Springvale (2)	Sandringham (5)	14.10 (94) d. 6.15 (51)	Victoria Park	6,445	24 September 1995	
Victorian Football Association renamed to the Victorian Football League
1996	Springvale (3)	Frankston (2)	11.7 (73) d. 10.10 (70)	Princes Park	8,183	22 September 1996	
1997	Sandringham (6)	Frankston (3)	10.13 (73) d. 5.14 (44)	North Port Oval	10,000	21 September 1997	
1998	Springvale (4)	Werribee (2)	11.17 (83) d. 5.15 (45)	North Port Oval	8,672	20 September 1998	
1999	Springvale (5)	North Ballarat	19.11 (125) d. 9.11 (65)	North Port Oval	6,212	19 September 1999	
2000	Sandringham (7)	North Ballarat (2)	15.18 (108) d. 11.11 (77)	Waverley Park	8,652	27 August 2000	
2001	Box Hill	Werribee (3)	13.13 (91) d. 7.12 (54)	Princes Park	11,500	23 September 2001	
2002	Geelong reserves	Port Melbourne (18)	15.15 (105) d. 12.11 (83)	Princes Park	11,500	22 September 2002	
2003	Williamstown (13)	Box Hill (2)	13.14 (92) d. 9.9 (63)	Princes Park	10,500	21 September 2003	
2004	Sandringham (8)	Port Melbourne (19)	9.13 (67) d. 9.9 (63)	Princes Park	8,196	19 September 2004	
2005	Sandringham (9)	Werribee (4)	11.17 (83) d. 11.8 (74)	Princes Park	9,000	18 September 2005	
2006	Sandringham (10)	Geelong reserves	13.13 (91) d. 11.7 (73)	Princes Park	6,000	24 September 2006	
2007	Geelong reserves (2)	Coburg (8)	17.24 (126) d. 7.10 (52)	Princes Park	13,842	23 September 2007	
2008	North Ballarat	Port Melbourne (20)	18.12 (120) d. 11.9 (75)	Docklands Stadium	11,641	26 September 2008	
2009	North Ballarat (2)	Northern Bullants (5)	14.7 (91) d. 10.8 (68)	Docklands Stadium	14,026	25 September 2009	
2010	North Ballarat (3)	Northern Bullants (6)	20.13 (133) d. 13.8 (86)	Docklands Stadium	11,000	19 September 2010	
2011	Port Melbourne (16)	Williamstown (11)	22.12 (144) d. 13.10 (88)	Docklands Stadium	11,804	25 September 2011	
2012	Geelong reserves (3)	Port Melbourne (21)	14.24 (108) d. 11.9 (75)	Docklands Stadium	14,536	23 September 2012	
2013	Box Hill (2)	Geelong reserves (2)	14.15 (99) d. 11.12 (78)	Docklands Stadium	15,199	22 September 2013	
2014	Footscray reserves	Box Hill (3)	16.13 (109) d. 13.9 (87)	Docklands Stadium	23,816	21 September 2014	
2015	Williamstown (14)	Box Hill (4)	18.12 (120) d. 8.18 (66)	Docklands Stadium	12,900	27 September 2015	
2016	Footscray reserves (2)	Casey (2)	13.19 (97) d. 10.6 (66)	Docklands Stadium	17,348	25 September 2016	
2017	Port Melbourne (17)	Richmond reserves	11.8 (74) d. 10.10 (70)	Docklands Stadium	17,159	24 September 2017	
2018	Box Hill (3)	Casey (3)	10.12 (72) d. 8.14 (62)	Docklands Stadium	12,884	23 September 2018	
2019	Richmond reserves	Williamstown (12)	8.10 (58) d. 7.13 (55)	Princes Park	13,165	22 September 2019	
2020	Season not contested due to COVID-19 pandemic in Victoria						
2021	Finals series not contested and premiership not awarded due to COVID-19 pandemic in Victoria						
2022	Casey (6)	Southport	10.10 (70) d. 5.8 (38)	Princes Park	4,500	18 September 2022	
2023	Gold Coast reserves	Werribee (5)	17.10 (112) d. 14.9 (93)	Princes Park	7,148	24 September 2023	
2024	Werribee (2)	Southport (2)	10.9 (69) d. 8.15 (63)	Princes Park	4,500	22 September 2024	
2025	Footscray reserves (3)	Southport (3)	14.5 (89) d. 11.13 (79)	Princes Park	8,818	21 September 2025	
2026	Box Hill (4)	Geelong reserves (3)	8.14 (62) d. 5.9 (39)	Princes Park	12,941	20 September 2026	

=== Division 2 premiers ===
Year	Premiers	Runners-up	Score	Venue	Crowd	Date	Report
1961	Northcote	Dandenong	12.15 (87) d. 9.18 (72)	Toorak Park	10,000	10 September 1961	
1962	Dandenong	Prahran	16.24 (120) d. 8.12 (60)	Toorak Park	12,000	9 September 1962	
1963	Preston	Waverley	11.14 (80) d. 9.15 (69)	Toorak Park	15,000	15 September 1963	
1964	Geelong West	Sunshine	14.14 (98) d. 11.11 (77)	Toorak Park	10,000	13 September 1964	
1965	Preston (2)	Mordialloc	15.12 (102) d. 9.10 (64)	Toorak Park	10,000	12 September 1965	
1966	Prahran	Geelong West	17.12 (114) d. 5.15 (45)	Toorak Park	10,000	11 September 1966	
1967	Oakleigh	Geelong West (2)	12.14 (86) d. 11.7 (73)	Coburg Oval	4,000	10 September 1967	
1968	Geelong West (2)	Williamstown	20.15 (135) d. 18.15 (123)	Toorak Park	6,000	26 August 1968	
1969	Williamstown	Sunshine (2)	15.14 (104) d. 12.12 (84)	Toorak Park	6,000	7 September 1969	
1970	Coburg	Box Hill	20.17 (137) d. 16.11 (107)	Toorak Park	8,000	6 September 1970	
1971	Sunshine	Brunswick	22.26 (158) d. 16.8 (104)	Toorak Park	10,000	12 September 1971	
1972	Geelong West (3)	Caulfield	14.16 (100) d. 14.10 (94)	Toorak Park	10,000	10 September 1972	
1973	Caulfield	Brunswick (2)	18.20 (128) d. 14.22 (106)	Toorak Park	8,000	9 September 1973	
1974	Coburg (2)	Brunswick (3)	18.17 (125) d. 9.15 (69)	Toorak Park	11,000	8 September 1974	
1975	Brunswick	Camberwell	18.22 (130) d. 12.11 (83)	Toorak Park	9,000	7 September 1975	
1976	Williamstown (2)	Mordialloc (2)	19.13 (127) d. 9.16 (70)	Toorak Park	10,000	5 September 1976	
1977	Mordialloc	Yarraville	19.19 (133) d. 14.11 (95)	Toorak Park	7,300	11 September 1977	
1978	Frankston	Camberwell	15.13 (103) d. 13.11 (89)	Toorak Park	8,000	10 September 1978	
1979	Camberwell	Oakleigh	18.13 (121) d. 12.11 (83)	Toorak Park	12,023	9 September 1979	
1980	Brunswick (2)	Yarraville	20.27 (147) d. 14.14 (98)	Toorak Park	5,243	7 September 1980	
1981	Camberwell (2)	Waverley (2)	15.16 (106) d. 11.8 (74)	Toorak Park	8,250	6 September 1981	
1982	Northcote (2)	Caulfield (2)	12.15 (87) d. 11.16 (82)	Toorak Park	6,000	12 September 1982	
1983	Springvale	Brunswick (4)	17.9 (111) d. 13.16 (94)	Toorak Park	4,000	11 September 1983	
1984	Box Hill	Oakleigh (2)	32.23 (215) d. 11.14 (80)	Toorak Park	10,735	16 September 1984	
1985	Brunswick (3)	Oakleigh (3)	25.18 (168) d. 22.12 (144)	St Kilda Cricket Ground	22,341 (C-R)	22 September 1985	
1986	Box Hill (2)	Sunshine (3)	14.14 (98) d. 11.14 (80)	St Kilda Cricket Ground	20,146 (C-R)	21 September 1986	
1987	Prahran (2)	Waverley (3)	18.9 (117) d. 14.14 (98)	St Kilda Cricket Ground	19,620 (C-R)	20 September 1987	
1988	Oakleigh (2)	Sunshine (4)	22.17 (149) d. 15.9 (99)	Windy Hill	22,034 (C-R)	18 September 1988	

== Premierships by team ==
These tables summarise all senior premierships won by each team. The "Grand Final Matches" column includes all Grand Finals and Grand Final Replays listed in the previous section (including the forfeiture in 1904), and because of this, the column will not necessary equal the sum of the premierships and runners-up columns.

=== Division 1 ===
Club	Premierships	Runners-up	Grand final matches	Premiership years	Runner-up years
Port Melbourne	17	21	35	1897, 1901, 1922, 1940, 1941, 1947, 1953, 1964, 1966, 1974, 1976, 1977, 1980, 1981, 1982, 2011, 2017	1902, 1923, 1925, 1928, 1929, 1945, 1950, 1951, 1952, 1954, 1955, 1956, 1957, 1965, 1967, 1987, 1993, 2002, 2004, 2008, 2012
Williamstown	14	12	26	1907, 1921, 1939, 1945, 1949, 1954, 1955, 1956, 1958, 1959, 1986, 1990, 2003, 2015	1900, 1924, 1948, 1961, 1964, 1970, 1985, 1988, 1989, 1992, 2011, 2019
Sandringham	10	5	15	1946, 1962, 1985, 1992, 1994, 1997, 2000, 2004, 2005, 2006	1947, 1960, 1963, 1977, 1995
Footscray	9	5	11	1898, 1899, 1900, 1908, 1913, 1919, 1920, 1923, 1924	1906, 1912, 1914, 1921, 1922
Geelong	7	4	1	1878, 1879, 1880, 1882, 1883, 1884, 1886	1881, 1887, 1888, 1895 (equal)
Coburg	6	8	14	1926, 1927, 1928, 1979, 1988, 1989	1932, 1933, 1934, 1941, 1959, 1980, 1986, 2007
Hotham/North Melbourne	6	6	8	1903, 1904, 1910, 1914, 1915, 1918	1897, 1898, 1899, 1905, 1913, 1919
Oakleigh	6	3	9	1930, 1931, 1950, 1952, 1960, 1972	1949, 1973, 1974
Springvale/Casey	6	3	9	1987, 1995, 1996, 1998, 1999, 2022	1990, 2016, 2018
Prahran	5	5	10	1937, 1951, 1970, 1973, 1978	1909, 1918, 1936, 1940, 1968
South Melbourne	5	4	1	1881, 1885, 1888, 1889, 1890	1880, 1882, 1886, 1896
Northcote	5	2	7	1929, 1932, 1933, 1934, 1936	1930, 1931
Preston/Northern	4	6	10	1968, 1969, 1983, 1984	1971, 1978, 1981, 1982, 2009, 2010
Box Hill	4	4	8	2001, 2013, 2018, 2026	1994, 2003, 2014, 2015
Essendon	4	3	0	1891, 1892, 1893, 1894	1882, 1884, 1885
Brunswick	3	7	10	1909, 1925, 1938	1908, 1910, 1911, 1915, 1920, 1937, 1939
Dandenong	3	4	7	1967, 1971, 1991	1969, 1972, 1975, 1976
North Ballarat	3	2	5	2008, 2009, 2010	1999, 2000
Geelong reserves	3	3	6	2002, 2007, 2012	2006, 2013, 2026
Footscray reserves	3	0	3	2014, 2016, 2025	
Werribee	2	5	7	1993, 2024	1991, 1998, 2001, 2005, 2023
Carlton	2	4	0	1877, 1887	1879, 1889, 1890, 1891
Richmond	2	3	3	1902, 1905	1901, 1903, 1904
Moorabbin	2	2	5	1957, 1963	1958, 1962
Yarraville	2	1	2	1935, 1961	1953
Essendon (A.)	2	0	2	1911, 1912	
Brighton/Caulfield	1	3	4	1948	1926, 1927, 1938
Geelong West	1	2	3	1975	1979, 1983
Fitzroy	1	1	0	1895	1892
Collingwood	1	1	1	1896	1895 (equal)
West Melbourne	1	1	2	1906	1907
Waverley	1	1	2	1965	1966
Richmond reserves	1	1	2	2019	2017
Gold Coast reserves	1	0	1	2023	
Melbourne	0	5	1		1877, 1878, 1893, 1894, 1895 (equal)
Frankston	0	3	3		1984, 1996, 1997
Southport	0	3	3		2022, 2024, 2025
Camberwell	0	2	2		1935, 1946

=== Division 2 ===
Club	Premierships	Runners-up	Grand final matches	Premiership years	Runner-up years
Brunswick	3	4	7	1975, 1980, 1985	1971, 1973, 1974, 1983
Geelong West	3	2	5	1964, 1968, 1972	1966, 1967
Oakleigh	2	3	5	1967, 1988	1979, 1984, 1985
Camberwell	2	2	4	1979, 1981	1975, 1978
Williamstown	2	1	3	1969, 1976	1968
Box Hill	2	1	3	1984, 1986	1970
Prahran	2	1	3	1966, 1987	1962
Preston	2	0	2	1963, 1965	
Coburg	2	0	2	1970, 1974	
Northcote	2	0	2	1961, 1982	
Sunshine	1	4	5	1971	1964, 1969, 1986, 1988
Caulfield	1	2	3	1973	1972, 1982
Mordialloc	1	2	3	1977	1965, 1976
Dandenong	1	1	2	1962	1961
Frankston	1	0	1	1978	
Springvale	1	0	1	1983	
Waverley	0	3	3		1963, 1981, 1987
Yarraville	0	2	2		1977, 1980

== Grand finals by venue ==
This table summarises the venues for all matches listed in the above table as grand finals, including grand final replays.

=== Division 1 ===
Venue	Total	Grand finals	Challenge finals	Non-challenge finals	Years
St Kilda Cricket Ground	38	38	0	0	1945–1962, 1966, 1970–1987 (Replay in 1958)
Princes Park	18	18	0	0	1990–1993, 1996, 2001–2007, 2019, 2022–2026
Docklands Stadium	11	11	0	0	2008–2018
North Melbourne Cricket Ground	10	0	6	4	1909–1912, 1915, 1918, 1922–1924, 1930
East Melbourne Cricket Ground	9	1	3	5	1896, 1903, 1905–1907, 1913–1914, 1919–1920 (Was to have hosted the cancelled 1904 final)
Port Melbourne Cricket Ground	7	6	1	0	1931, 1963–1965, 1997–1999
Melbourne Cricket Ground	6	4	1	1	1878, 1908, 1929, 1939–1941
Motordrome/Olympic Park	4	1	1	2	1925–1927, 1933
Toorak Park	4	4	0	0	1935–1938
Richmond Cricket Ground	3	3	0	0	1967–1969
Windy Hill	2	2	0	0	1988–1989
Victoria Park	2	2	0	0	1994–1995
Fitzroy Cricket Ground	1	0	1	0	1921
Brunswick Cricket Ground	1	0	0	1	1928
Coburg Cricket Ground	1	0	0	1	1932
Melbourne Showgrounds	1	1	0	0	1934
Waverley Park	1	1	0	0	2000

=== Division 2 ===
Venue	Total	Grand finals	Challenge finals	Non-challenge finals	Years
Toorak Park	23	23	0	0	1961–1966, 1968–1984
St Kilda Cricket Ground	3	3	0	0	1985–1987
Coburg Cricket Ground	1	1	0	0	1967
Windy Hill	1	1	0	0	1988

== Consecutive premierships ==
The most VFA/VFL premierships won consecutively is four, achieved only once, by Essendon (1891–1894). A further eleven teams have won three premierships in a row, and a further thirteen teams have won back-to-back premierships.

#	Club	Years
4	Essendon (L.)	1891, 1892, 1893, 1894
3	Geelong	1878, 1879, 1880
3	Geelong	1882, 1883, 1884
3	South Melbourne	1888, 1889, 1890
3	Footscray	1898, 1899, 1900
3	North Melbourne	1914, 1915, 1918
3	Coburg	1926, 1927, 1928
3	Northcote	1932, 1933, 1934
3	Williamstown	1954, 1955, 1956
3	Port Melbourne	1980, 1981, 1982
3	Sandringham	2004, 2005, 2006
3	North Ballarat	2008, 2009, 2010
2	North Melbourne	1903, 1904
2	Essendon (A.)	1911, 1912
2	Footscray	1919, 1920
2	Footscray	1923, 1924
2	Oakleigh	1930, 1931
2	Port Melbourne	1940, 1941
2	Williamstown	1958, 1959
2	Preston	1968, 1969
2	Port Melbourne	1976, 1977
2	Preston	1983, 1984
2	Coburg	1988, 1989
2	Springvale	1995, 1996
2	Springvale	1998, 1999

== Minor grades ==
=== Seconds/Reserves/Development League ===
Reserves teams for the VFA clubs competed in a dedicated competition from 1928 until 2017. This competition was known as the Victorian Junior Football Association until 1932, then throughout most of its history as the VFA Seconds, then later as the VFA Reserves, VFL Reserves and finally as the VFL Development League. The competition was disbanded at the end of 2017. As for the Seniors, the competition was played across two divisions between 1961 and 1988; clubs played in the same division as their senior teams.

Division 1

- 1928 Coburg (1)
- 1929 Coburg (2)
- 1930 Coburg (3)
- 1931 Brunswick (1)
- 1932 Brunswick (2)
- 1933 Brunswick (3)
- 1934 Coburg (4)
- 1935 Coburg (5)
- 1936 Brunswick (4)
- 1937 Coburg (6)
- 1938 Coburg (7)
- 1939 Coburg (8)
- 1940 Coburg (9)
- 1941 Williamstown (1)
- 1942 not contested
- 1943 not contested
- 1944 Port Melbourne (1)
- 1945 Yarraville (1)
- 1946 Prahran (1)
- 1947 Coburg (10)
- 1948 Williamstown (2)
- 1949 Port Melbourne (2)
- 1950 Coburg (11)
- 1951 Port Melbourne (3)
- 1952 Yarraville (2)
- 1953 Yarraville (3)
- 1954 Moorabbin (1)
- 1955 Williamstown (3)
- 1956 Williamstown (4)
- 1957 Preston (1)
- 1958 Coburg (12)
- 1959 Port Melbourne (4)
- 1960 Sandringham (1)
- 1961 Sandringham (2)
- 1962 Coburg (13)
- 1963 Brunswick (5)
- 1964 Port Melbourne (5)
- 1965 Port Melbourne (6)
- 1966 Williamstown (5)
- 1967 Waverley (1)
- 1968 Port Melbourne (7)
- 1969 Sandringham (3)
- 1970 Port Melbourne (8)
- 1971 Oakleigh (1)
- 1972 Port Melbourne (9)
- 1973 Port Melbourne (10)
- 1974 Port Melbourne (11)
- 1975 Coburg (14)
- 1976 Coburg (15)
- 1977 Sandringham (4)
- 1978 Preston (2)
- 1979 Sandringham (5)
- 1980 Port Melbourne (12)
- 1981 Dandenong (1)
- 1982 Sandringham (6)
- 1983 Preston (3)
- 1984 Preston (4)
- 1985 Preston (5)
- 1986 Williamstown (6)
- 1987 Preston (6)
- 1988 Springvale (1)
- 1989 Frankston (1)
- 1990 Coburg (16)
- 1991 Prahran (2)
- 1992 Frankston (2)
- 1993 Sandringham (7)
- 1994 Sandringham (8)
- 1995 Springvale (2)
- 1996 Port Melbourne (13)
- 1997 Frankston (3)
- 1998 North Ballarat (1)
- 1999 North Ballarat (2)
- 2000 Sandringham (9)
- 2001 Werribee (1)
- 2002 Williamstown (7)
- 2003 Williamstown (8)
- 2004 Port Melbourne (14)
- 2005 Williamstown (9)
- 2006 Box Hill (1)
- 2007 Coburg (17)
- 2008 Williamstown (10)
- 2009 Box Hill (2)
- 2010 Box Hill (3)
- 2011 Box Hill (4)
- 2012 Coburg (18)
- 2013 Williamstown (11)
- 2014 Williamstown (12)
- 2015 Williamstown (13)
- 2016 Box Hill (5)
- 2017 Casey (3)

Source where unlisted

Division 2

- 1961 Preston (1)
- 1962 Preston (2)
- 1963 Camberwell (1)
- 1964 Northcote (1)
- 1965 Prahran (1)
- 1966 Sunshine (1)
- 1967 Northcote (2)
- 1968 Northcote (3)
- 1969 Williamstown (1)
- 1970 Northcote (4)
- 1971 Brunswick (1)
- 1972 Brunswick (2)
- 1973 Caulfield (1)
- 1974 Coburg (1)
- 1975 Northcote (5)
- 1976 Frankston (1)
- 1977 Yarraville (1)
- 1978 Oakleigh (1)
- 1979 Yarraville (2)
- 1980 Williamstown (2)
- 1981 Camberwell (2)
- 1982 Springvale (1)
- 1983 Brunswick (3)
- 1984 Brunswick (4)
- 1985 Brunswick (5)
- 1986 Dandenong (1)
- 1987 Werribee (1)
- 1988 Werribee (2)

=== Thirds ===
Under age teams, usually Under-19s but for brief periods Under-18s, for the VFA clubs competed in a dedicated competition between 1952 and 1994. This competition was known throughout most of its history as the VFA Thirds, and eventually as the VFA Under-19s. This competition was disbanded when the VSFL took over administration of the VFA in 1995. The competition was played across two divisions between 1961 and 1988, with the clubs playing in the same division as their senior team – with the exceptions of 1984 and 1985, when clubs from both divisions played in a unified thirds competition.

Division 1

- 1952 Port Melbourne (1)
- 1953 Moorabbin (1)
- 1954 Preston (1)
- 1955 Yarraville (1)
- 1956 Brunswick (1)
- 1957 Northcote (1)
- 1958 Williamstown (1)
- 1959 Preston (2)
- 1960 Preston (3)
- 1961 Coburg (1)
- 1962 Northcote (2)
- 1963 Northcote (3)
- 1964 Preston (4)
- 1965 Waverley (1)
- 1966 Sandringham (1)
- 1967 Sandringham (2)
- 1968 Sandringham (3)
- 1969 Sandringham (4)
- 1970 Prahran (1)
- 1971 Williamstown (2)
- 1972 Prahran (2)
- 1973 Sandringham (5)
- 1974 Preston (5)
- 1975 Oakleigh (1)
- 1976 Preston (6)
- 1977 Sandringham (6)
- 1978 Sandringham (7)
- 1979 Sandringham (8)
- 1980 Sandringham (9)
- 1981 Preston (7)
- 1982 Preston (8)
- 1983 Preston (9)
- 1984 Preston (10)
- 1985 Springvale (1)
- 1986 Williamstown (3)
- 1987 Williamstown (4)
- 1988 Coburg (2)
- 1989 Preston (11)
- 1990 Werribee (1)
- 1991 Frankston (1)
- 1992 Werribee (2)
- 1993 Port Melbourne (2)
- 1994 Sandringham (10)

Division 2

- 1961 Preston (1)
- 1962 Preston (2)
- 1963 Sunshine (1)
- 1964 Prahran (1)
- 1965 Sunshine (2)
- 1966 Northcote (1)
- 1967 Oakleigh (1)
- 1968 Box Hill (1)
- 1969 Williamstown (1)
- 1970 Frankston (1)
- 1971 Sunshine (3)
- 1972 Geelong West (1)
- 1973 Caulfield (1)
- 1974 Northcote (2)
- 1975 Waverley (1)
- 1976 Box Hill (2)
- 1977 Waverley (2)
- 1978 Waverley (3)
- 1979 Williamstown (2)
- 1980 Northcote (3)
- 1981 Williamstown (3)
- 1982 Brunswick (1)
- 1983 Moorabbin (1983–1987) (1)
- 1984 not contested
- 1985 not contested
- 1986 Oakleigh (2)
- 1987 Waverley (4)
- 1988 Dandenong (1)

=== Total premierships at all levels ===
Club	Div 1 Seniors	Div 2 Seniors	Total Seniors	Div 1 Seconds	Div 2 Seconds	Total Seconds	Div 1 Thirds	Div 2 Thirds	Total Thirds	Total
Box Hill	4	2	6	5	0	5	0	2	2	13
Brighton	1	0	1	0	0	0	0	0	0	1
Brunswick	3	3	6	5	5	10	1	1	2	18
Camberwell	0	2	2	0	2	2	0	0	0	4
Carlton	2	–	2	–	–	–	–	–	–	2
Casey/Springvale	6	1	7	3	1	4	1	0	1	12
Caulfield	0	1	1	0	1	1	0	1	1	3
Coburg	6	2	8	18	1	19	2	0	2	29
Collingwood	1	–	1	–	–	–	–	–	–	1
Dandenong	3	1	4	1	1	2	0	1	1	7
Essendon	4	–	4	–	–	–	–	–	–	4
Essendon (A.)	2	–	2	–	–	–	–	–	–	2
Fitzroy	1	–	1	–	–	–	–	–	–	1
Footscray	9	–	9	–	–	–	–	–	–	9
Footscray reserves	3	–	3	–	–	–	–	–	–	3
Frankston	0	1	1	3	1	4	1	1	2	7
Geelong	7	–	7	–	–	–	–	–	–	7
Geelong reserves	3	–	3	–	–	–	–	–	–	3
Geelong West	1	3	4	0	0	0	0	1	1	5
Gold Coast reserves	1	–	1	–	–	–	–	–	–	1
Moorabbin (1951–1963)	2	–	2	1	–	1	1	–	1	4
Moorabbin (1983–1987)	–	0	0	–	0	0	0	1	1	1
Mordialloc	0	1	1	0	0	0	0	0	0	1
North Ballarat	3	–	3	2	–	2	–	–	–	5
North Melbourne	6	–	6	–	–	–	–	–	–	6
Northern/Preston	4	2	6	6	2	8	11	2	13	27
Northcote	5	2	7	0	5	5	3	3	6	18
Oakleigh	6	2	8	1	1	2	1	2	3	13
Port Melbourne	17	–	17	14	–	14	2	–	2	33
Prahran	5	2	7	2	1	3	2	1	3	13
Richmond	2	–	2	–	–	–	–	–	–	2
Richmond reserves	1	–	1	–	–	–	–	–	–	1
Sandringham	10	–	10	9	–	9	10	–	10	29
South Melbourne	5	–	5	–	–	–	–	–	–	5
Sunshine	0	1	1	0	1	1	0	3	3	5
Waverley	1	0	1	1	0	1	1	4	5	7
Werribee	2	0	2	1	2	3	2	0	2	7
West Melbourne	1	–	1	–	–	–	–	–	–	1
Williamstown	14	2	16	13	2	15	4	3	7	38
Yarraville	2	0	2	3	2	5	1	0	1	8

=== Premierships in all three grades in a season ===
On six occasions did a club win premierships in all three grades in a single year. Preston achieved the feat in back-to-back seasons, and Williamstown also achieved the feat twice.

Year	Club	Division
1969	Williamstown	Division 2
1973	Caulfield	Division 2
1983	Preston	Division 1
1984	Preston	Division 1 (Seniors & Seconds); Combined division (Thirds)
1986	Williamstown	Division 1
1994	Sandringham	Single division

== See also ==
- List of VFA/VFL minor premiers

== Sources ==
- Australian Football League
- Full Points Footy
- AFL Tables
