= 1945 VFA season =

1945 VFA premiership season
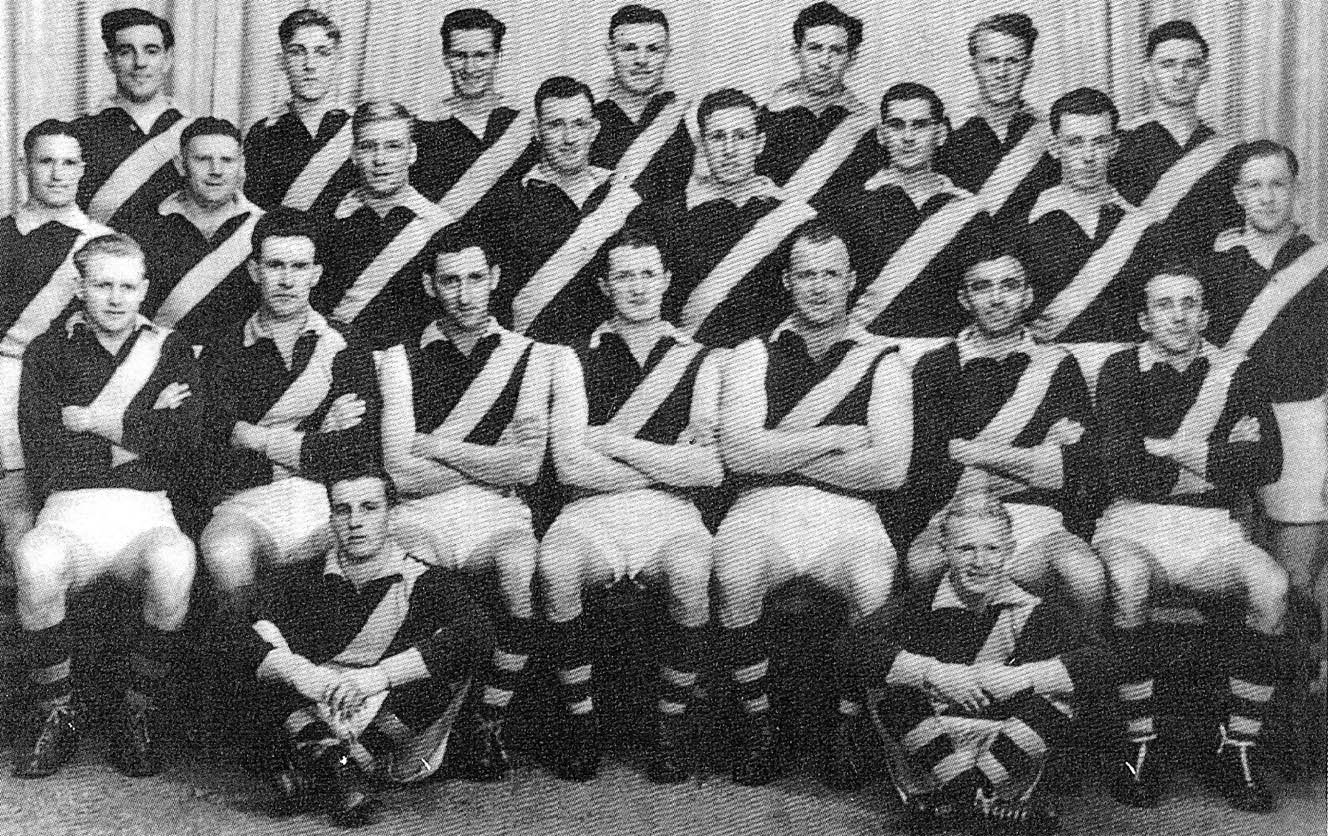
- Williamstown FC, premier team
- Teams: 12
- Premiers: Williamstown; 4th premiership
- Minor premiers: Coburg; 4th minor premiership

The 1945 Victorian Football Association season was the 64th season of the Australian rules football competition, and it was the first season played since the Association went into recess during World War II. The premiership was won by the Williamstown Football Club, which defeated Port Melbourne by 37 points in the Grand Final on 6 October. It was the club's fourth VFA premiership.

Minor premiers Coburg went through the home-and-home season unbeaten, before losing both finals to finish third.

== Resumption of play ==
World War II commenced in Europe in September 1939, and had spread to the Pacific in December 1942. The Association had continued contesting the premiership in 1940 and 1941, but cancelled the 1942, 1943 and 1944 seasons when it became clear that the competition would distract from the war effort. On 12 June 1944, the Association decided that it would resume the premiership in 1945, even though the Pacific War would ultimately not end until late 1945.

Two clubs – Brighton and Port Melbourne – both had obstacles to overcome to resume playing in the Association. Brighton had practically ceased to exist in either a playing or administrative capacity during the war, but upon it being confirmed that the Association was to resume, the club was able to assemble a football committee and make preparations for the season. Port Melbourne was unable to use North Port Oval as a home venue during the season as its surface was in need of repairs after having been commandeered and used as a vegetable garden as part of the war effort, so it secured Olympic Park as a home venue; but, unhappy with the arrangement, the club ultimately moved many of its games in the second half of the year to other Association grounds.

The Victorian Football League (VFL) had continued playing throughout the war, and approximately 200 VFA players had crossed to the rival competition. The Association delegates ruled that any players who did not return to the Association now that it had resumed competition would be suspended from the VFA for five years.

== Premiership ==
The home-and-home season was played over twenty matches, before the top four clubs contested a finals series under the Page–McIntyre system to determine the premiers for the season.

=== Ladder ===
1945 VFA ladder
Pos	Team	Pld	W	L	D	PF	PA	PP	Pts
1	Coburg	20	20	0	0	2506	1355	184.9	80
2	Williamstown (P)	20	17	3	0	2448	1522	160.8	68
3	Port Melbourne	20	15	5	0	2294	1606	142.8	60
4	Camberwell	20	12	8	0	1948	1890	103.1	48
5	Preston	20	11	9	0	1753	1751	100.1	44
6	Prahran	20	10	10	0	2116	2018	104.9	40
7	Northcote	20	10	10	0	1753	1815	96.6	40
8	Brunswick	20	8	12	0	1807	1697	106.5	32
9	Brighton	20	8	12	0	1598	2109	75.8	32
10	Yarraville	20	5	15	0	1796	2085	86.1	20
11	Sandringham	20	2	18	0	1476	2444	60.4	8
12	Oakleigh	20	2	18	0	1292	2493	51.8	8

Rules for classification: 1) points; 2) percentage; 3) number of points for.
(P) Premiers

=== Finals ===
	Semifinals
Saturday, 15 September	Port Melbourne 23.17 (155)	def.	Camberwell 15.11 (101)	St Kilda Cricket Ground (crowd: 16,000)
Saturday, 22 September	Coburg 8.23 (71)	def. by	Williamstown 12.16 (88)	St Kilda Cricket Ground (crowd: 17,000)

	Preliminary Final
Saturday, 29 September	Coburg 13.11 (89)	def. by	Port Melbourne 13.13 (91)	St Kilda Cricket Ground (crowd: 16,000)

1945 VFA Grand Final
Saturday, 6 October	Williamstown	def.	Port Melbourne	St Kilda Cricket Ground (crowd: 39,000)
6.4 (40); 10.10 (70); 10.13 (73); 16.21 (117)	Q1; Q2; Q3; Final	3.8 (26); 5.14 (44); 8.18 (66); 10.20 (80)	Umpires: Merrington
Todd 6, Harris 3, Spring 3, Cockburn, Glass, Hearne, Matthews	Goals	Culph 4, Freyer 2, Houston, Kelly, Livingstone, Taylor

== Awards ==
- Ron Todd (Williamstown) was the leading goalkicker for the season, kicking 179 goals in the home-and-away season and 188 goals overall. Todd broke Bob Pratt's Association record of 183 goals, achieved in 1941; his record also exceeded Western Australian forward George Doig's national record of 152 goals in a season, but it was not recognised as a national record because the Association was not playing under ANFC rules at the time. As of 2019 this remains the record for most goals in an Association season.
- The Recorder Cup and V.F.A. Medal, which had been awarded to the best and fairest player in the Association, were replaced in 1945 by a single award known as the J. J. Liston Trophy, named after former Association president J. J. Liston who had died in 1944. Eric Beard (Oakleigh) won the award in 1945, polling 51 votes. Col Bencraft (Sandringham) finished second with 36 votes, and J. Baker (Brunswick) finished third with 32 votes.
- Yarraville won the seconds premiership for the first time. Yarraville 12.24 (96) defeated Port Melbourne 11.13 (79) in the Grand Final, played as a curtain raiser to the seniors Grand Final on Saturday 6 October at the St Kilda Cricket Ground.

== Notable events ==
- On 28 April, Sandringham suffered its thirty-seventh consecutive loss, breaking the record of thirty-six set by Melbourne City in 1912–1913. Sandringham ultimately suffered forty-four consecutive defeats before defeating Oakleigh on 23 June, 10.12 (72) d. 7.10 (52). The club's last win had been on 25 May 1940 against Camberwell.
- On 9 June, a crowd of 21,000 attended the match between Coburg and Williamstown at Coburg, setting a new record for the highest crowd ever at an Association home-and-home match.
- In July, Brighton changed its colours from red and white to maroon and gold – in large part because their red and white guernseys were unusable after having shrunk in repeated washes.
- A carnival was held at the St Kilda Cricket Ground on Sunday 2 September, with an attendance of 12,000 raising £426 for Prince Henry's Hospital. As part of the entertainment, a team of VFA umpires 8.9 (57) defeated a team of VFL umpires 4.15 (39) for the Ken Luke Challenge Cup; the match was played under League rules in the first half, and Association rules in the second half, with Richmond's Jack Dyer and Coburg's Bob Atkinson serving as umpires for their respective codes.
- Williamstown and Coburg visited Broken Hill in mid-October. On Saturday 20 October, Coburg 16.18 (114) defeated Williamstown 12.8 (80) in an exhibition match under Association rules; and on Sunday 21 October, a combined Coburg/Williamstown team 14.15 (99) defeated a combined Broken Hill Football League team 12.12 (84) under the League rules which were used in Broken Hill at the time. Both matches attracted large crowds.

== See also ==
- List of VFA premiers
