= Harry Vallence =

Australian rules footballer (1905–1991)

Personal information
- Full name: Henry Francis Vallence
- Nickname: Soapy
- Born: 4 June 1905; Bacchus Marsh, Victoria
- Died: 25 July 1991 (aged 86)
- Original team: Bacchus Marsh (BFL)
- Height: 6 ft 0 in (183 cm)
- Weight: 12 st 8 lb (80 kg)
- Position: Full forward

Playing career^{1}
Years	Club	Games (Goals)
1926–1938	Carlton	204 (722)
1939–1941	Williamstown	61 (337)
1945–1946	Brighton	21 (88)
Total		286 (1147)

Representative team honours
Years	Team	Games (Goals)
	Victoria	4 (19)
- ^{1} Playing statistics correct to the end of 1938.

Career highlights
- Carlton premiership player (1938); VFL leading goalkicker 1931; Carlton leading goalkicker 1929, 1931–1933, 1935–1938; Carlton Hall of Fame (1987); Carlton Team of the 20th Century

Henry Francis "Soapy" Vallence (4 June 1905 – 25 July 1991) was a champion Australian rules footballer in the Victorian Football League (VFL) and the Victorian Football Association (VFA). He played at full-forward for the VFL's Carlton Football Club in the 1930s, and in the 1940s for the VFA's Williamstown and Brighton Football Clubs.

== Family ==
The son of Michael Vallence and Mary Ann Vallence, née Pattinson, Henry Francis Vallence was born in Bacchus Marsh, Victoria, on 4 June 1905.

He married Lorna Josephine Bliss (1915–1996) on 17 June 1940.

== Football ==
=== Carlton (VFL) ===
Originally from Bacchus Marsh, in 1926 he came to Carlton as a half-forward. He soon moved to full-forward, where he became known for his safe hands and mighty kick. He kicked 11 goals in a match on four occasions—twice in finals.

=== Williamstown (VFA) ===
In 1937, he left Carlton to play with Williamstown Football Club in the Victorian Football Association as captain-coach. His dispute with Carlton arising when he returned from representing Victoria in an interstate match to find himself selected at centre half-back in the seconds' grade.

=== Carlton (VFL) ===
He was lured back to Carlton for the 1938 season, helping to secure the Blues' first premiership in 23 years.

=== Williamstown (VFA) ===
Vallence returned again to Williamstown in 1939, this time playing under the Association's throw-pass rules adopted in 1938. In 1939, Vallence kicked 133 goals and helped Williamstown to a premiership, and he kicked another 111 goals in 1940. On 24 May 1941, Vallence achieved two significant milestones: he kicked a career-high twenty goals against Sandringham and brought up his 1000th career goal across both the League and Association. His career with Williamstown ended after 1941, when the competition went into recess during World War II.

=== Carlton (VFL) ===
He was captain-coach of the Carlton Reserves for three seasons (1942–1944). (Note: The VFA did not play its senior competition in 1942, 1943 and 1944, though it resumed its seconds (reserves) competition in the last of those years.)

=== Brighton (VFA) ===
Vallence resumed playing after World War II as the captain-coach at Brighton, where he played his last game in 1946 and kicked eleven goals in that game.

Vallence played 204 games and kicked 722 goals for Carlton in his career; this remained a club record until broken by Stephen Kernahan in 1997.

Vallance also kicked a further 337 goals for Williamstown, 88 goals for Brighton, and 19 goals in interstate football matches for Victoria: if these are considered here, Vallance kicked a total of 1166 senior career goals.

== Death ==
He died on 25 July 1991 of Alzheimer's disease in Geelong Hospital.

== Recognition ==
In 1996, Vallence was inducted into the Australian Football Hall of Fame.

== External references ==
- The Australian Encyclopaedia, v.4, Grollier, 1963, p. 140
- "Soapy has them roaring again". The Argus. 16 August 1955. p. 18.
