= Yarraville Oval =

Sports venue in Yarraville, Victoria

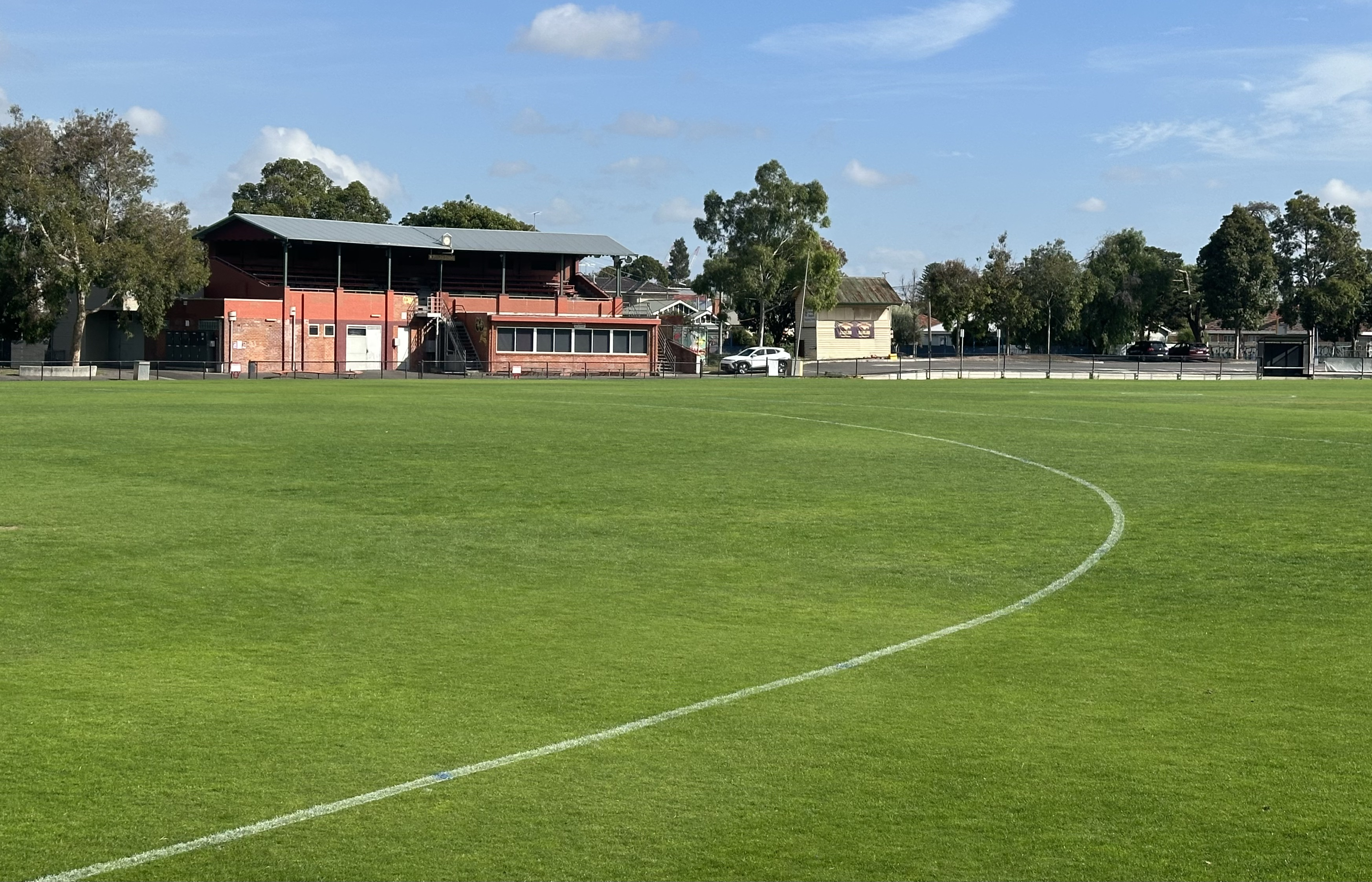
- Yarraville Oval in April 2026
- Interactive map of Yarraville Oval
- Address: Williamstown Rd & Anderson St; Yarraville, Victoria
- Coordinates: 37°48′54″S 144°53′3″E
- Owner: City of Maribyrnong
- Capacity: 6,000

Tenants
- Yarraville Cricket Club; Yarraville/Seddon Football Club (WRFL); Yarraville Football Club (VFJA/VFA 1903–1984)

Yarraville Oval is an Australian rules football and cricket ground in the Melbourne suburb of Yarraville. It is currently the home ground of the Yarraville Seddon Eagles and the Yarraville Cricket Club.

The ground was most notable as the home of the Yarraville Football Club throughout almost its entire existence in both the Victorian Junior Football Association (VJFA) from 1903 until 1927, and then in the Victorian Football Association (VFA) from 1928 until 1982 (the club played its games at the Western Oval in its final season in 1983). The ground was originally managed by a group of trustees, but management of the ground was transferred to the Footscray Council in 1928 to enable the ground to be upgraded to Association standards. The City of Maribyrnong, which incorporates the former City of Footscray, remains the ground manager.

In 1942, Yarraville Oval was the home of the Footscray Football Club in the Victorian Football League because its normal home ground, the Western Oval, was being used as an army base, whilst the VFA was in recess until 1945. The Western Region Football League had its head office at the Oval until 2010.

A ground record crowd estimated to be between 16,000 and 18,000 attended Ron Todd's first VFA match for Williamstown, played against Yarraville on 20 April 1940. The record crowd for a VFL game was set on 25 July 1942 when 15,000 fans turned out to see Footscray defeat eventual grand finalist Richmond by seven points in a high-scoring game.

One of the most noticeable features of the Yarraville Oval is the historic W. Pedley Stand. The grandstand was built in two sections and has a unique V shape: the southern half of the stand was built in 1929, and the northern half was built in 1940. The viewing area of the grandstand was damaged by fire in 2017.

== Tenants ==
| Club | Years | Sport |
|---|---|---|
| Yarraville F.C | 1903–1983, 1996–2006 | Football |
| Yarraville C.C. | 1903–present | Cricket |
| Yarraville Boys Club | 1968–2006 | Football |
| Footscray F.C. | 1942 | Football |
| Kingsville F.C. | 1990–1995 | Football |
| Yarraville/Seddon Eagles | 2007–present | Football |
| W.R.F.L. (Offices and League Finals) | 1990–2010 | Football |
