= Charlie Challenger =

Australian rules footballer (1917–1996)

Personal information
- Full name: Charles Thomas Challenger
- Born: 9 December 1917; Fremantle, Western Australia
- Died: 28 November 1996 (aged 78); Fairfield, Victoria
- Original team: Brunswick
- Height: 174 cm (5 ft 9 in)
- Weight: 76 kg (168 lb)

Playing career^{1}
Years	Club	Games (Goals)
1938-1940	Brunswick (VFA)	39 (3)
1940	Essendon (VFL)	2 (0)
1940-1941	Brunswick (VFA)	27 (6)
1946-1947	Brunswick (VFA)	16 (4)
Total		84 (13)
- ^{1} Playing statistics correct to the end of 1947.

Charles Thomas Challenger (9 December 1917 – 28 November 1996) was an Australian rules footballer who played with Essendon in the Victorian Football League (VFL).

== Family ==
He married Margaret Ellen Donohue in 1960.

== Football ==
=== Brunswick (VFA) ===
In April 1937, he was cleared from Plenty Rovers in the Diamond Valley Football League to the Brunswick Second XVIII. Although not part of the regular home-and-away VFA season, Challenger played a match with the Brunswick First XVIII, in which he was declared Brunswick's "most effective player", against the Ballarat Imperial Football Club in September 1937.

He played his first senior VFA home-and-away match for Brunswick, against Coburg, on 16 April 1938; and, at the end of his first senior season, he was declared the club's "most improved player".

He played in two VFA Grand finals:

- 1938: as a wing-man (kicking 2 goals) in Brunswick's 19-17 (131) victory over Brighton 14.14 (98).
- 1939: as a back-pocket in Brunswick's nine point loss to Williamstown, 14.11 (95) to 14.20 (104).

=== Essendon (VFL) ===
On 21 March 1940 he trained for the first time with Essendon. He was cleared to Essendon in April 1940.

He only played in two First XVIII games for Essendon, both on the half-forward flank: against Fitzroy on 18 May 1940, and against Hawthorn on 25 May 1940.

=== Brunswick (VFA) ===
He was cleared back to Brunswick from Essendon in July 1940, and played his first senior match in his second time at Brunswick, in the back-pocket, against Coburg on 6 July 1940.

== Military service ==
He served in the Australian Army during World War II.
