= Jack Brenchley =

Australian rules footballer

Personal information
- Born: 23 November 1910
- Died: 16 January 1970 (aged 59)
- Original team: Prahran
- Height: 179 cm (5 ft 10 in)
- Weight: 80 kg (176 lb)

Playing career^{1}
Years	Club	Games (Goals)
1942	St Kilda	9 (8)

Coaching career
Years	Club	Games (W–L–D)
1941	Oakleigh (VFA)	20 (5–15–0)
1956	Prahran (VFA)	20 (4–15–1)
- ^{1} Playing statistics correct to the end of 1942.

Jack Brenchley (23 November 1910 – 16 January 1970) was an Australian rules footballer who played with St Kilda in the Victorian Football League (VFL). He also played for and coached both Prahran and Oakleigh in the Victorian Football Association (VFA).

== Career ==
Brenchley came from Edithvale to play for Prahran in the VFA during the 1930s. He was on a half forward flank in Prahran's 1937 premiership team and remained with Prahran until the end of the 1940 VFA season, when he was cleared to coach Oakleigh.

Under Brenchley, Oakleigh won five games in 1941 and finished 10th on the ladder, of 12 clubs.

The following year he played for St Kilda in the VFL, a late recruit to the league, at 31 years of age. He made nine appearances and kicked eight goals. It was his only season of senior football with St Kilda, but he remained at the club as coach of the seconds.

He was non playing coach of Prahran in 1956.
