= 1942 VFL season =

46th season of the Victorian Football League (VFL)

1942 VFL premiership season
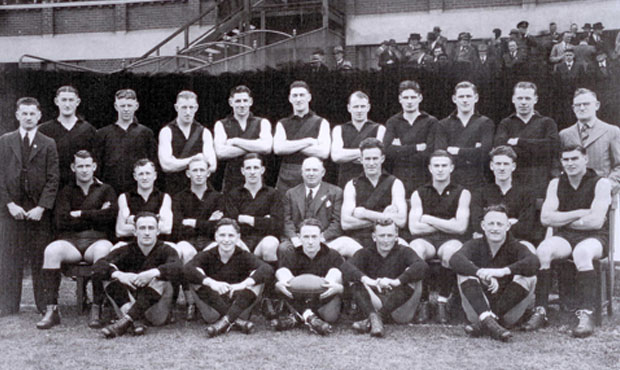
- Essendon Football Club, premier team
- Teams: 11
- Premiers: Essendon; 7th premiership
- Minor premiers: Essendon; 7th minor premiership
- Brownlow Medallist: Not awarded
- Lindsay White (South Melbourne)
- Matches played: 84
- Highest: 49,000

The 1942 VFL season was the 46th season of the Victorian Football League (VFL), the highest level senior Australian rules football competition in Victoria.

Played during the peak of World War II, only eleven of the league's twelve clubs competed, with Geelong withdrawing due to travel restrictions. The season ran from 9 May until 19 September, and comprised a home-and-away season in which each club played either 14 or 15 games, followed by a finals series featuring the top four clubs.

The premiership was won by the Essendon Football Club for the seventh time, after it defeated Richmond by 53 points in the 1942 VFL Grand Final.

== Background ==
=== Influence of World War II ===
World War II had many effects on the organisation of football in Australia:

- Geelong was unable to compete in the competition because of wartime travel restrictions. Temporary transfers to other clubs were available to Geelong players (limit of three per club).
- Melbourne and Collingwood struggled to field teams, and at one stage considered amalgamating into a joint team, however they were both ultimately able to compete.
- Hawthorn and Collingwood withdrew their teams from the reserves competition.
- Available servicemen were often called upon to make up the numbers – this accounts for the drop in form of the Melbourne team, having previously won three premierships in a row.
- The VFA went into recess, and any eligible players were given temporary league permits.
- The Brownlow Medal was suspended until 1946.
- Many ground changes were also forced upon teams, as their usual home grounds were used in the war effort. The new grounds used were Yarraville Oval (Footscray), Toorak Park (St Kilda), Punt Road Oval (Melbourne) and Princes Park (South Melbourne).
- Government regulations meant the traditional matches on the King's Birthday public holiday could not be played until 1946.

=== Format ===
In 1942, the VFL competition consisted of eleven teams of 18 on-the-field players each, plus one substitute player, known as the 19th man. A player could be substituted for any reason; however, once substituted, a player could not return to the field of play under any circumstances. Teams played each other in a home-and-away season of 16 rounds; once the 16 round home-and-away season had finished, the 1942 VFL Premiers were determined by the specific format and conventions of the Page–McIntyre system.

The determination of the 1942 season's fixtures was complicated by the fact that when the VFL decided to proceed with senior football on 1 April, it was not known which grounds would be available. All 1941 grounds except Windy Hill and the Brunswick Street Oval were candidates for long-term appropriation by the military, and the VFL announced that unless three grounds were available, it would not play the season. Consequently, each round's fixture through the first eleven weeks was set only on the previous Wednesday week, rather than being pre-determined at the start of the season. Ultimately the Melbourne Cricket Ground, the Lake Oval, the Western Oval, and the Junction Oval all became unavailable; but, several Victorian Football Association grounds became available when the VFA announced on 21 April that it was going into recess, resulting in St Kilda and Footscray moving to Toorak Park and Yarraville Oval respectively, and the remaining ground losses were managed by Melbourne sharing the Punt Road Oval with Richmond and South Melbourne sharing Princes Park with Carlton.

During the first eleven rounds, each team played each other once and had one bye. The remaining five rounds (Rounds 12 to 16) featured the same matches as Rounds 1 to 5. This resulted in an uneven fixture in which six teams played 15 matches, and five teams played 14 matches. Teams were awarded four premiership points for each bye, so the teams with an extra bye were favoured by this draw.

== Home-and-away season ==
=== Round 1 ===
Home team	Home team score	Away team	Away team score	Venue	Crowd	Date
Hawthorn	13.15 (93)	North Melbourne	18.19 (127)	Glenferrie Oval	5,000	9 May 1942
Fitzroy	14.13 (97)	St Kilda	10.12 (72)	Brunswick Street Oval	8,000	9 May 1942
Essendon	25.14 (164)	Melbourne	16.14 (110)	Windy Hill	8,000	9 May 1942
Richmond	19.17 (131)	Footscray	16.15 (111)	Punt Road Oval	14,000	9 May 1942
South Melbourne	18.25 (133)	Collingwood	14.11 (95)	Princes Park	8,000	9 May 1942

=== Round 2 ===
Home team	Home team score	Away team	Away team score	Venue	Crowd	Date
Melbourne	18.9 (117)	Richmond	30.16 (196)	Punt Road Oval	20,000	16 May 1942
Carlton	8.11 (59)	South Melbourne	13.21 (99)	Princes Park	16,000	16 May 1942
St Kilda	16.13 (109)	Hawthorn	9.17 (71)	Toorak Park	5,500	16 May 1942
North Melbourne	14.10 (94)	Fitzroy	17.13 (115)	Arden Street Oval	5,500	16 May 1942
Footscray	12.16 (88)	Essendon	14.8 (92)	Yarraville Oval	10,000	16 May 1942

=== Round 3 ===
Home team	Home team score	Away team	Away team score	Venue	Crowd	Date
Fitzroy	20.13 (133)	Melbourne	11.11 (77)	Brunswick Street Oval	7,000	23 May 1942
South Melbourne	22.24 (156)	St Kilda	11.16 (82)	Princes Park	6,500	23 May 1942
Hawthorn	5.11 (41)	Footscray	17.15 (117)	Glenferrie Oval	5,000	23 May 1942
Richmond	25.25 (175)	Collingwood	5.7 (37)	Punt Road Oval	11,500	23 May 1942
Essendon	11.9 (75)	Carlton	11.4 (70)	Windy Hill	13,000	23 May 1942

=== Round 4 ===
Home team	Home team score	Away team	Away team score	Venue	Crowd	Date
North Melbourne	12.8 (80)	South Melbourne	8.17 (65)	Arden Street Oval	12,000	30 May 1942
Collingwood	13.9 (87)	Essendon	20.16 (136)	Victoria Park	6,500	30 May 1942
Carlton	13.13 (91)	Fitzroy	9.14 (68)	Princes Park	14,000	30 May 1942
St Kilda	11.17 (83)	Richmond	25.13 (163)	Toorak Park	9,000	30 May 1942
Melbourne	16.15 (111)	Hawthorn	8.17 (65)	Punt Road Oval	3,500	30 May 1942

=== Round 5 ===
Home team	Home team score	Away team	Away team score	Venue	Crowd	Date
Fitzroy	11.13 (79)	Footscray	12.11 (83)	Brunswick Street Oval	9,000	6 June 1942
Essendon	15.19 (109)	North Melbourne	9.15 (69)	Windy Hill	10,000	6 June 1942
South Melbourne	23.10 (148)	Melbourne	16.19 (115)	Princes Park	5,500	6 June 1942
Hawthorn	13.10 (88)	Collingwood	10.20 (80)	Glenferrie Oval	4,000	6 June 1942
Richmond	15.14 (104)	Carlton	10.17 (77)	Punt Road Oval	20,000	6 June 1942

=== Round 6 ===
Home team	Home team score	Away team	Away team score	Venue	Crowd	Date
Melbourne	6.9 (45)	St Kilda	13.11 (89)	Punt Road Oval	4,000	13 June 1942
Essendon	10.17 (77)	Richmond	11.10 (76)	Windy Hill	18,000	13 June 1942
Collingwood	11.12 (78)	Footscray	11.21 (87)	Victoria Park	5,500	13 June 1942
Carlton	20.18 (138)	North Melbourne	13.13 (91)	Princes Park	7,000	13 June 1942
Fitzroy	11.17 (83)	South Melbourne	9.15 (69)	Toorak Park	10,000	13 June 1942

=== Round 7 ===
Home team	Home team score	Away team	Away team score	Venue	Crowd	Date
Richmond	10.9 (69)	South Melbourne	11.20 (86)	Punt Road Oval	18,000	20 June 1942
Fitzroy	16.14 (110)	Hawthorn	14.10 (94)	Brunswick Street Oval	5,000	20 June 1942
North Melbourne	11.10 (76)	Melbourne	12.11 (83)	Arden Street Oval	4,000	20 June 1942
St Kilda	11.14 (80)	Collingwood	9.14 (68)	Toorak Park	5,000	20 June 1942
Footscray	12.19 (91)	Carlton	10.12 (72)	Yarraville Oval	8,500	20 June 1942

=== Round 8 ===
Home team	Home team score	Away team	Away team score	Venue	Crowd	Date
Fitzroy	12.9 (81)	Richmond	15.15 (105)	Brunswick Street Oval	17,000	27 June 1942
Essendon	22.12 (144)	Hawthorn	5.8 (38)	Windy Hill	6,000	27 June 1942
Carlton	18.14 (122)	St Kilda	10.11 (71)	Princes Park	6,500	27 June 1942
North Melbourne	9.8 (62)	Footscray	17.16 (118)	Arden Street Oval	6,000	27 June 1942
Melbourne	11.14 (80)	Collingwood	14.21 (105)	Punt Road Oval	5,500	27 June 1942

=== Round 9 ===
Home team	Home team score	Away team	Away team score	Venue	Crowd	Date
Footscray	7.3 (45)	South Melbourne	11.9 (75)	Yarraville Oval	9,500	4 July 1942
Collingwood	10.18 (78)	Fitzroy	12.7 (79)	Victoria Park	6,000	4 July 1942
Richmond	11.14 (80)	North Melbourne	11.11 (77)	Punt Road Oval	5,000	4 July 1942
St Kilda	6.9 (45)	Essendon	4.15 (39)	Toorak Park	4,500	4 July 1942
Hawthorn	8.10 (58)	Carlton	12.14 (86)	Glenferrie Oval	3,000	4 July 1942

=== Round 10 ===
Home team	Home team score	Away team	Away team score	Venue	Crowd	Date
Footscray	19.17 (131)	St Kilda	7.18 (60)	Yarraville Oval	6,000	11 July 1942
Carlton	13.17 (95)	Melbourne	10.7 (67)	Princes Park	5,500	11 July 1942
Fitzroy	12.10 (82)	Essendon	15.17 (107)	Brunswick Street Oval	15,000	11 July 1942
North Melbourne	17.8 (110)	Collingwood	11.16 (82)	Arden Street Oval	3,500	11 July 1942
South Melbourne	12.19 (91)	Hawthorn	13.10 (88)	Punt Road Oval	6,000	11 July 1942

=== Round 11 ===
Home team	Home team score	Away team	Away team score	Venue	Crowd	Date
Hawthorn	13.17 (95)	Richmond	19.13 (127)	Glenferrie Oval	6,000	18 July 1942
Essendon	10.15 (75)	South Melbourne	8.7 (55)	Windy Hill	16,000	18 July 1942
St Kilda	21.9 (135)	North Melbourne	9.8 (62)	Toorak Park	4,000	18 July 1942
Melbourne	14.11 (95)	Footscray	19.12 (126)	Punt Road Oval	6,000	18 July 1942
Collingwood	11.11 (77)	Carlton	13.14 (92)	Victoria Park	8,000	18 July 1942

=== Round 12 ===
Home team	Home team score	Away team	Away team score	Venue	Crowd	Date
Footscray	19.15 (129)	Richmond	17.20 (122)	Yarraville Oval	15,000	25 July 1942
Collingwood	9.15 (69)	South Melbourne	15.21 (111)	Victoria Park	8,000	25 July 1942
North Melbourne	9.10 (64)	Hawthorn	6.16 (52)	Arden Street Oval	3,000	25 July 1942
St Kilda	10.13 (73)	Fitzroy	12.14 (86)	Toorak Park	8,000	25 July 1942
Melbourne	14.20 (104)	Essendon	12.12 (84)	Punt Road Oval	6,000	25 July 1942

=== Round 13 ===
Home team	Home team score	Away team	Away team score	Venue	Crowd	Date
Hawthorn	8.9 (57)	St Kilda	10.15 (75)	Glenferrie Oval	3,500	1 August 1942
Fitzroy	20.14 (134)	North Melbourne	10.8 (68)	Brunswick Street Oval	5,500	1 August 1942
Essendon	15.12 (102)	Footscray	10.8 (68)	Windy Hill	14,000	1 August 1942
Richmond	15.21 (111)	Melbourne	12.14 (86)	Punt Road Oval	9,000	1 August 1942
South Melbourne	10.24 (84)	Carlton	12.17 (89)	Princes Park	15,000	1 August 1942

=== Round 14 ===
Home team	Home team score	Away team	Away team score	Venue	Crowd	Date
St Kilda	6.10 (46)	South Melbourne	13.11 (89)	Toorak Park	3,500	8 August 1942
Footscray	20.17 (137)	Hawthorn	9.4 (58)	Yarraville Oval	2,500	8 August 1942
Collingwood	12.11 (83)	Richmond	16.21 (117)	Victoria Park	3,500	8 August 1942
Carlton	18.20 (128)	Essendon	11.9 (75)	Princes Park	7,500	8 August 1942
Melbourne	12.13 (85)	Fitzroy	10.8 (68)	Punt Road Oval	3,000	8 August 1942

=== Round 15 ===
Home team	Home team score	Away team	Away team score	Venue	Crowd	Date
Richmond	18.20 (128)	St Kilda	8.8 (56)	Punt Road Oval	7,000	15 August 1942
Hawthorn	7.15 (57)	Melbourne	16.22 (118)	Glenferrie Oval	2,500	15 August 1942
South Melbourne	22.13 (145)	North Melbourne	12.15 (87)	Princes Park	5,000	15 August 1942
Essendon	11.17 (83)	Collingwood	9.10 (64)	Windy Hill	8,000	15 August 1942
Fitzroy	13.20 (98)	Carlton	17.13 (115)	Brunswick Street Oval	13,000	15 August 1942

=== Round 16 ===
Home team	Home team score	Away team	Away team score	Venue	Crowd	Date
Melbourne	14.7 (91)	South Melbourne	14.23 (107)	Punt Road Oval	10,000	22 August 1942
Collingwood	16.21 (117)	Hawthorn	15.13 (103)	Victoria Park	2,000	22 August 1942
Carlton	18.19 (127)	Richmond	10.14 (74)	Princes Park	26,000	22 August 1942
Footscray	19.15 (129)	Fitzroy	14.8 (92)	Yarraville Oval	8,000	22 August 1942
North Melbourne	5.8 (38)	Essendon	8.16 (64)	Arden Street Oval	4,000	22 August 1942

== Ladder ==
Teams were awarded four premiership points for each bye, with five teams receiving two byes as the result of an uneven fixture.

(P)	Premiers
	Qualified for finals

#	Team	P	W	L	D	B	PF	PA	%	Pts
1	Essendon (P)	15	12	3	0	1	1426	1122	127.1	52
2	Richmond	15	11	4	0	1	1778	1322	134.5	48
3	South Melbourne	15	11	4	0	1	1513	1173	129.0	48
4	Footscray	14	10	4	0	2	1460	1159	126.0	48
5	Carlton	14	10	4	0	2	1361	1132	120.2	48
6	Fitzroy	15	8	7	0	1	1405	1340	104.9	36
7	St Kilda	14	6	8	0	2	1076	1314	81.9	32
8	Melbourne	15	5	10	0	1	1384	1624	85.2	24
9	North Melbourne	14	4	10	0	2	1105	1413	78.2	24
10	Collingwood	14	2	12	0	2	1120	1474	76.0	16
11	Hawthorn	15	1	14	0	1	1058	1613	65.6	8

Rules for classification: 1. premiership points; 2. percentage; 3. points for
Average score: 91.8
Source: AFL Tables

== Finals series ==
=== Semi-finals ===
Home team	Score	Away team	Score	Venue	Crowd	Date
South Melbourne	13.13 (91)	Footscray	7.22 (64)	Princes Park	25,000	29 August
Essendon	8.8 (56)	Richmond	11.12 (78)	Princes Park	32,000	5 September

=== Preliminary final ===
Home team	Score	Away team	Score	Venue	Crowd	Date
Essendon	19.10 (124)	South Melbourne	14.12 (96)	Princes Park	26,000	12 September

== Season notes ==
- In Round 2, Melbourne and Richmond set the record for the highest aggregate score in a game, with the teams combining for 48.25 (313). This record would stand for thirty years, eventually being broken in the 1972 grand final.
- Melbourne was led on to the field by RAAF air ace Squadron Leader Keith "Bluey" Truscott, DFC and Bar. Truscott unfurled Melbourne's 1941 premiership flag and, very obviously lacking match condition, played an average game, kicking a single goal in his team's 79-point loss, which proved the last of his fifty career senior games).
- The second half of the 1942 Grand Final was delayed as the captains Jack Dyer and Dick Reynolds, both of whom were in "reserved" occupations and, therefore, exempt from military service (Dyer was a police officer, and Reynolds a munitions worker), made speeches to the crowd in support of the wartime Austerity Loan.
- On Sunday 12 July at the Punt Road Oval, a Combined Services Team, which included Percy Beames, Allan La Fontaine, Jack Mueller, Alby Pannam, and Norman Ware, played a match against a combined team of VFL players chosen by the Lord Mayor of Melbourne, former Olympic swimming champion Sir Frank Beaurepaire, which included Norm Smith, Jack Dyer, and Bob Chitty.
- On Saturday, 26 September, the premiers, Essendon played a patriotic match against a Combined Services Team that included former VFL stars Laurie Nash, Bob Pratt and Ron Todd (all of whom had been lost to the VFL since crossing to the Victorian Football Association before the war). Essendon won 24.18 (162) to 20.15 (135) before a crowd of 10,000 at Princes Park.
- Hawthorn recorded its only win of the season over Collingwood in Round 5, the first time that the Hawks had beaten the Magpies since they joined the VFL in 1925 after 29 losses. Hawthorn were to lose nineteen in a row to the Magpies between 1944 and 1954 before its first peacetime victory in Round 4, 1955.

== Awards ==
- The 1942 VFL Premiership team was Essendon.
- The VFL's leading goalkicker was Lindsay White of South Melbourne with 67 goals (80 after finals); White usually played for Geelong, but transferred to South Melbourne because Geelong had withdrawn from the war-time competition.
- No Brownlow Medal was awarded in 1942.
- Hawthorn took the "wooden spoon" in 1942.
- The seconds premiership was won by St Kilda. St Kilda 13.10 (88) defeated Fitzroy 7.15 (57) in the Grand Final, played as a stand-alone match on 12 September at the Punt Road Oval.

== Sources ==
- 1942 VFL season at AFL Tables
- 1942 VFL season at Australian Football
