= 1941 VFA season =

1941 VFA premiership season
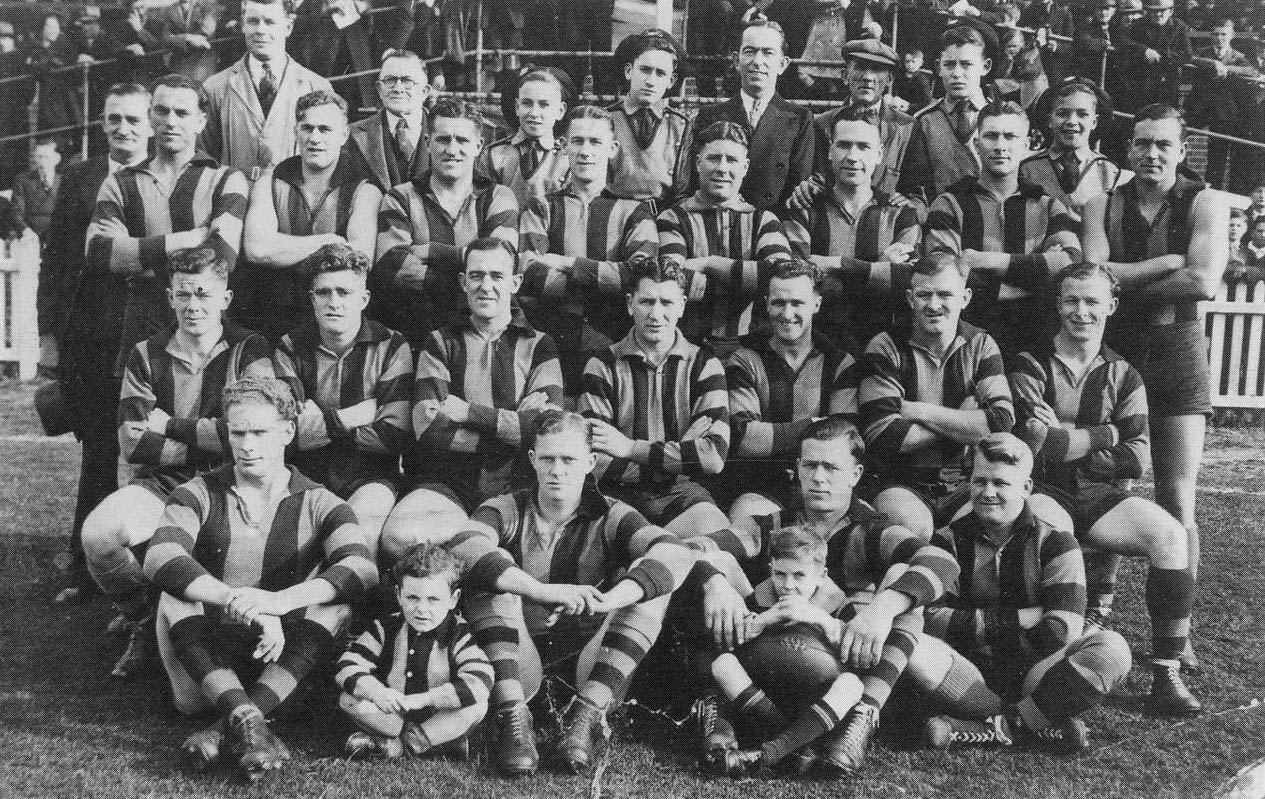
- Port Melbourne FC, premier team
- Teams: 12
- Premiers: Port Melbourne; 5th premiership
- Minor premiers: Port Melbourne; 1st minor premiership

The 1941 Victorian Football Association season was the 63rd season of the Australian rules football competition, and it was the last season before the Association went into recess during World War II. The premiership was won by the Port Melbourne Football Club, which defeated Coburg by 19 points in the Grand Final on 4 October. It was Port Melbourne's fifth VFA premiership, and its second in a row.

== Association membership ==
World War II had commenced in Europe in September 1939, and for the second consecutive season the Association opted to proceed with a full premiership season. Many Association players had enlisted in the war effort, and the Sandringham Football Club elected to operate on an amateur basis for the season.

== Premiership ==
The home-and-home season was played over twenty matches, before the top four clubs contested a finals series under the Page–McIntyre system to determine the premiers for the season.

=== Ladder ===
1941 VFA ladder
Pos	Team	Pld	W	L	D	PF	PA	PP	Pts
1	Port Melbourne (P)	20	16	4	0	2546	1753	145.2	64
2	Prahran	20	16	4	0	2545	1820	139.8	64
3	Coburg	20	15	5	0	2641	1754	150.6	60
4	Preston	20	14	6	0	2481	1928	128.7	56
5	Brunswick	20	13	7	0	2353	1758	133.8	52
6	Williamstown	20	12	8	0	2351	1973	119.2	48
7	Camberwell	20	12	8	0	2265	2228	101.7	48
8	Northcote	20	7	13	0	1860	1978	94.0	28
9	Brighton	20	6	14	0	1933	2328	83.0	24
10	Oakleigh	20	5	15	0	1960	2403	81.6	20
11	Yarraville	20	4	16	0	1643	2621	62.7	16
12	Sandringham	20	0	20	0	1245	3279	38.0	0

Rules for classification: 1) points; 2) percentage; 3) number of points for.
(P) Premiers

=== Finals ===
	Semifinals
Saturday, 13 September	Coburg 16.21 (117)	def.	Preston 11.21 (87)	Toorak Park (crowd: 12,000)
Saturday, 20 September	Port Melbourne 15.19 (109)	def.	Prahran 15.17 (107)	Toorak Park (crowd: 8,000)

	Preliminary Final
Saturday, 27 September	Prahran 13.17 (95)	def. by	Coburg 19.12 (126)	Toorak Park (crowd: 8,000)

1941 VFA Grand Final
Saturday, 4 October	Port Melbourne	def.	Coburg	Melbourne Cricket Ground (crowd: 36,289)
1.4 (10); 6.10 (46); 9.12 (66); 15.18 (108)	Q1; Q2; Q3; Final	3.10 (28); 3.14 (32); 9.20 (74); 11.23 (89)	Umpires: Groves
Freyer 6, Robertson 6, Goldsmith, Hurley, Livingstone	Goals	Pratt 4, Glenister 2, Beagley, Collins, Lonsdale, McLey, Turner

== Awards ==
- Bob Pratt (Coburg) was the leading goalkicker for the season, kicking 165 goals in the home-and-home season and 183 goals overall. Pratt broke George Hawkins' Association record of 164 goals, achieved in 1939. The achievement meant that Pratt simultaneously held the season goalkicking record in both the Association and the Victorian Football League, in which he kicked 150 goals in 1934. Pratt's record exceeded Western Australian forward George Doig's national record of 152 goals in a season, but it was not recognised as a national record because the Association was not playing under ANFC rules at the time.
- Des Fothergill (Williamstown) won the Association best and fairest, receiving both the V.F.A. Medal and the Recorder Cup as trophies for the achievement. Fothergill polled a huge total of 62 votes – an average of 3.1 votes per game – and was a comfortable winner ahead of E. Fay (Brunswick) on 33 votes and Lance Collins (Coburg) on 32 votes. Fothergill had transferred to the Association from League club Collingwood in 1941, and had shared the 1940 Brownlow Medal as best and fairest of that competition.
- Williamstown won the seconds premiership. Williamstown 18.17 (125) defeated Coburg in the Grand Final, played as a curtain raiser to the seniors Grand Final on Saturday 4 October at the Melbourne Cricket Ground.

== Notable events ==
- On 30 August, Port Melbourne 43.29 (287) defeated Sandringham 7.9 (51). Port Melbourne's score set a new record for the highest score in Association history, breaking Brunswick's record of 37.16 (238) set in 1939.
- Three Port Melbourne players – Ted Freyer, Austin Robertson, and R. Reynolds – were all initially suspended for the Grand Final, but successfully appealed to overturn the suspensions. In the Grand Final, Robertson and Freyer kicked twelve of Port Melbourne's fifteen goals between them.
- Port Melbourne's win against Coburg in the Grand Final was the first time that Port Melbourne had defeated Coburg since July 1929.

== See also ==
- List of VFA/VFL Premiers
