= 1903 VFA season =

1903 premiership season
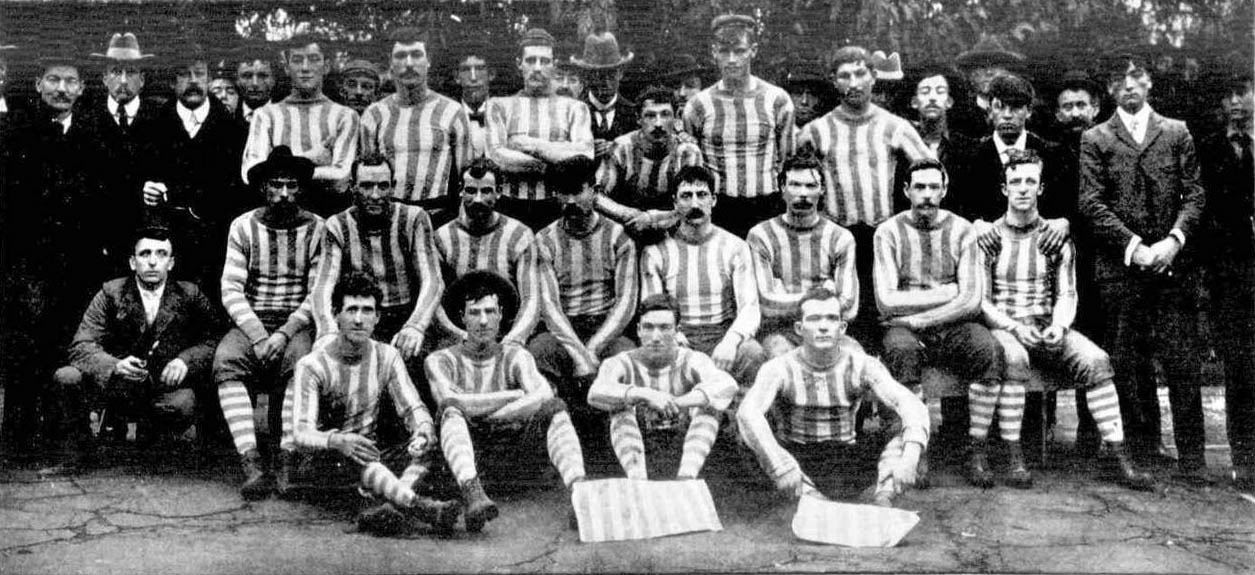
- North Melbourne, premiers
- Teams: 10
- Premiers: North Melbourne; 1st premiership
- Minor premiers: Richmond; 1st minor premiership

The 1903 Victorian Football Association season was the 27th season of the Australian rules football competition. For the first time in its history, the VFA introduced an annual finals series to determine the premiership. The premiership was won by the North Melbourne Football Club, after defeating Richmond in the challenge final; it was the first premiership in the club's history, after having competed in the Association since its inaugural season in 1877.

== Association membership ==
The size of the association was increased from nine to ten teams in 1903, with the Preston Football Club – which had won the previous three Victorian Junior Football Association premierships – elevated to senior level and admitted to the competition.

== Premiership ==
The Association introduced a finals system to determine the major premiership for the season. Finals had been used by the rival Victorian Football League since its establishment in 1897, but this was the first time it had been used by the Association. The finals were played according to the amended Argus system – the system which had been in use in the League since 1902, except with a slight variation that the League would not adopt until 1907; in summary:

- The top four clubs after the eighteen home-and-home matches qualified for the finals
- In the first week of finals, 1st played 3rd and 2nd played 4th
- In the second week, the winners from the first week played against each other
- In the third week, the minor premier (i.e. the club atop the ladder after the home-and-home matches) played against the winner from the second week to decide the major premiership – unless the winner from the second week was the minor premier, in which case the premiership was awarded automatically.

=== Ladder ===
1903 VFA ladder
Pos	Team	Pld	W	L	D	PF	PA	Pts
1	Richmond	18	16	2	0	941	351	64
2	North Melbourne (P)	18	15	2	1	1017	444	62
3	Footscray	18	14	4	0	954	457	56
4	West Melbourne	18	11	7	0	924	488	44
5	Williamstown	18	10	7	1	814	620	42
6	Brunswick	18	8	10	0	727	692	32
7	Preston	18	6	12	0	686	825	24
8	Port Melbourne	18	6	12	0	555	824	24
9	Prahran	18	3	15	0	596	979	12
10	Essendon Town	18	0	18	0	334	1233	0

Rules for classification: 1) points; 2) percentage; 3) number of points for.
(P) Premiers

=== Finals ===
	Semi Finals
Saturday, 5 September	North Melbourne 8.8 (56)	def.	West Melbourne 4.4 (28)	Port Melbourne Cricket Ground
Saturday, 5 September	Richmond 4.5 (29)	def. by	Footscray 9.11 (65)	North Melbourne Recreation Reserve

	Preliminary Final
Saturday, 12 September	North Melbourne 7.11 (53)	def.	Footscray 4.9 (33)	East Melbourne Cricket Ground

1903 VFA Grand Final
Saturday, 19 September	Richmond	def. by	North Melbourne	East Melbourne Cricket Ground (crowd: 18,000 – 20,000)
0.0 (0); 1.4 (10); 1.4 (10); 3.9 (27)	Q1; Q2; Q3; Final	3.4 (22); 3.4 (22); 7.6 (48); 7.6 (48)	Umpires: O'Loghlen
Johnston, Maine, Watson	Goals	Considine 3, Londrigan, McCann, Noonan, O'Brien
Owing to a very strong wind blowing during the game, neither team scored to the railway end of the ground.

== Notable events ==
- Mr James Hall, who had served as Association president since 1901, retired from his position prior to the start of the season. Footscray president, Mr Jason Cuming, was initially elected president in the annual general meeting in April 1903, but he declined the position; in a second election on 1 May, Essendon Town president Cr John George Aikman was elected president. Aikman served as president until his death in 1928.

== See also ==
- Victorian Football Association/Victorian Football League history (1877–2008)
- List of VFA premiers
