= Bert McTaggart =

Australian rules footballer, born 1916

Personal information
- Full name: Albert Robert William McTaggart
- Born: 20 April 1916; Williamstown, Victoria
- Died: 11 August 1997 (aged 81); Hobart, Tasmania
- Original team: Williamstown
- Height: 185 cm (6 ft 1 in)
- Weight: 79 kg (174 lb)

Playing career^{1}
Years	Club	Games (Goals)
1939	Williamstown (VFA)	21 (12)
1940–41	Carlton	9 (6)
1941	Williamstown (VFA)	14 (20)
1942–45	Footscray	59 (1)
- ^{1} Playing statistics correct to the end of 1945.

Albert Robert William McTaggart (20 April 1916 – 11 August 1997) was an Australian rules footballer who played with Carlton and Footscray in the Victorian Football League (VFL) during the 1940s.

A centre half forward in Williamstown's 1939 VFA premiership team, McTaggart was used as a forward at Carlton to limited effect. He kicked three goals from full-forward in his second senior game, against North Melbourne at Princes Park.

McTaggart returned to Williamstown for the second half of the 1941 season and then in 1942 he crossed to Footscray where he was shifted to defence, mostly as a back pocket. He played all of Footscray's 19 games in 1944, including a Semi Final. He missed the early part of the 1945 VFL season due to a hand injury.

McTaggart finished his football career in Tasmania, coaching Clarence, although he did return to Williamstown in 1952 and coached the Seconds.
