= 1943 VFA season =

1943 VFA premiership season
- Premiers: Premiership not contested

The 1943 Victorian Football Association season was not played owing to World War II, which was at its peak at the time.

== Abandonment of the season ==
World War II commenced in Europe in September 1939, and had spread to the Pacific in December 1941. The association had continued with a full program of football in the 1940 and 1941 seasons – with the sole exception that Sandringham had competed as an amateur club in the latter season – but had cancelled the 1942 season when it became clear that the competition would distract from the war effort.

By 1943, the state of war had not changed, and the association decided on 22 February that it would not resume the premiership for the season. The association premiership would not again be staged until 1945.
