= Charlie Culph =

Australian rules footballer

Personal information
- Full name: Charles Harrison Culph
- Born: 24 October 1920
- Died: 5 October 2007 (aged 86)
- Original team: Port Melbourne
- Height: 175 cm (5 ft 9 in)
- Weight: 72 kg (159 lb)

Playing career^{1}
| Years | Club | Games (Goals) |
| 1942–1944 | South Melbourne | 19 (55) |
- ^{1} Playing statistics correct to the end of 1944.

Charles Harrison Culph (24 October 1920 – 5 October 2007) was an Australian rules footballer who played with South Melbourne in the Victorian Football League (VFL).

Culph, a forward, was South Melbourne's leading goal-kicker in the 1943 VFL season. He kicked 35 goals from his 11 appearances that year, with a best of six goals in a win over Melbourne at Punt Road Oval.

He returned to his original club, Port Melbourne, in 1945 and remained with the club until his retirement in 1951, playing 117 games. Culph was a member of their 1947 premiership team and topped their goal-kicking in 1949.
