= 1944 VFA season =

1944 VFA premiership season
- Premiers: Premiership not contested

The 1944 Victorian Football Association season was not played owing to World War II, which was at its peak at the time. It was the last of three seasons which were cancelled during World War II.

== Abandonment of the season ==
World War II commenced in Europe in September 1939, and had spread to the Pacific in December 1941. The Association had continued with a full program of football in the 1940 and 1941 seasons – with the sole exception that Sandringham had competed as an amateur club in the latter season – but had cancelled the 1942 and 1943 seasons when it became clear that the competition would distract from the war effort.

The Association decided not to recommence play in February 1944, though four clubs – Coburg, Oakleigh, Northcote and Prahran – were in favour of recommencing. The issue of military commandeering of football grounds was no longer a significant impediment, but wartime rationing did not cover uniforms and footballs.

The Association seconds competition, which had been in recess during 1942 and 1943, resumed in 1944, with ten of the twelve clubs fielding a team – only Sandringham and Brighton did not compete. Clubs were, however, limited in the number of former senior players they could field. The seconds premiership was won by Port Melbourne. Port Melbourne 20.16 (136) defeated Oakleigh 12.16 (88) in the Grand Final at Coburg on 23 September before a crowd of 7,000.

== Notable events ==
- On 12 April, Association president J. J. Liston died at age 70 after a short illness. Liston had been president of the Association since 1929. Long-time Preston president Mr Henry Zwar, MLA replaced Liston as Association president.
