= Pat Hartnett (footballer) =

Australian rules footballer, born 1910

Personal information
- Full name: Patrick Hartnett
- Born: 17 May 1910; St Helens, Tasmania
- Died: 1 July 1990 (aged 80)
- Original team: North Launceston
- Height: 180 cm (5 ft 11 in)
- Weight: 79 kg (174 lb)
- Position: Half forward

Playing career^{1}
Years	Club	Games (Goals)
1930, 1934–37	St Kilda	66 (58)
- ^{1} Playing statistics correct to the end of 1937.

Patrick Hartnett (17 May 1910 – 1 July 1990) was an Australian rules footballer who played for St Kilda in the Victorian Football League (VFL) during the 1930s.

== Career ==
Hartnett came to St Kilda from North Launceston in Tasmania after winning that club's best all-round player award, and then returned to North after just one VFL season. He then played with Cananore before trying again at St Kilda in 1934. His second stint was more successful and he polled in St Kilda's top three at each of the 1934, 1935 and 1937 Brownlow Medal counts. Hartnett represented the VFL in 1935 and kicked six goals in an interstate match against South Australia, to go with the 22 goals he kicked for St Kilda that year.

He finished his career playing for Brighton in the VFA and won the 1939 Recorder Cup.

== Honors and awards ==
In 2005 Hartnett was inducted into the Tasmanian Football Hall of Fame.
