= 1940 VFA season =

1940 VFA premiership season
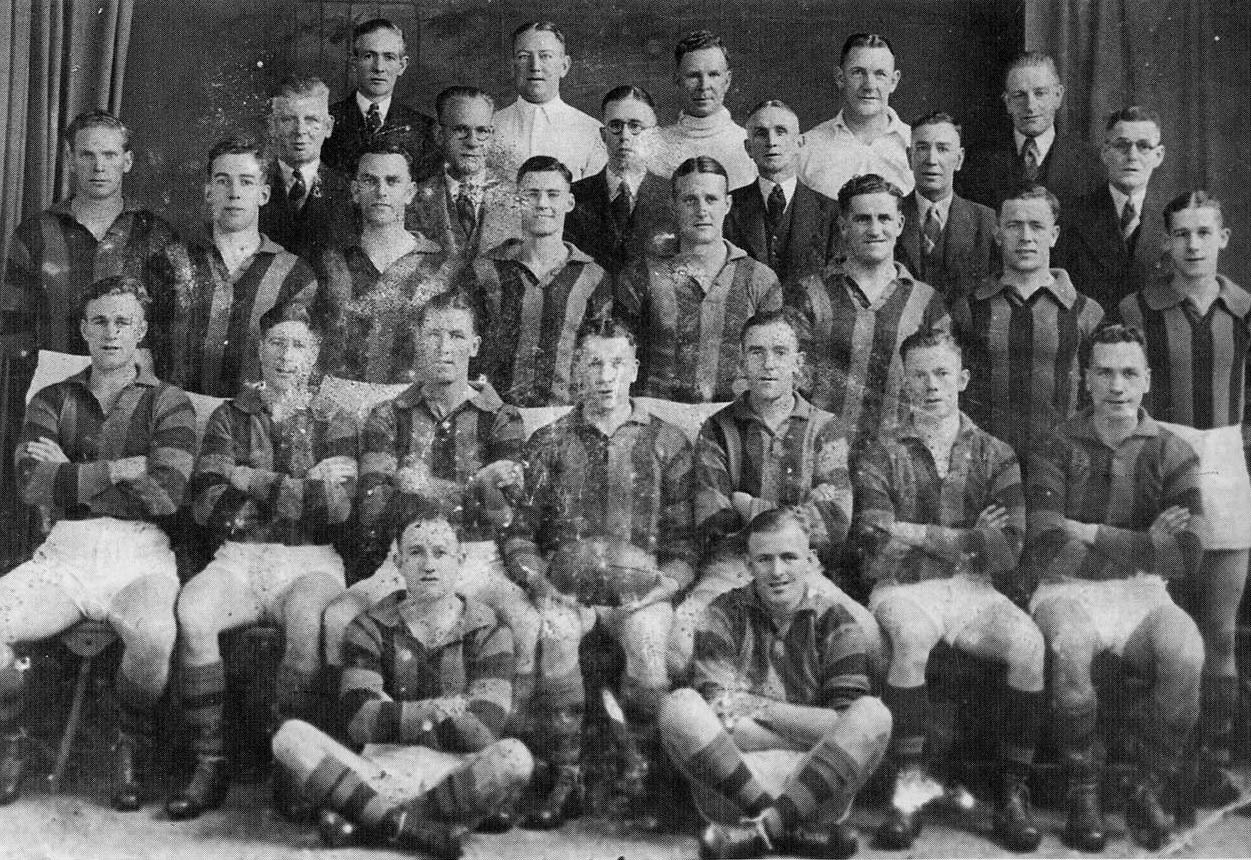
- Port Melbourne FC, premiers
- Teams: 12
- Premiers: Port Melbourne; 4th premiership
- Minor premiers: Williamstown; 2nd minor premiership

The 1940 Victorian Football Association season was the 62nd season of the Australian rules football competition. The premiership was won by the Port Melbourne Football Club, which defeated Prahran by 47 points in the Grand Final on 5 October. It was Port Melbourne's first VFA premiership since 1922, and its fourth overall.

== Premiership ==
World War II had commenced in Europe in September 1939, and the Association opted to proceed with a full premiership season. The home-and-home season was played over twenty matches, before the top four clubs contested a finals series under the Page–McIntyre system to determine the premiers for the season.

=== Ladder ===
1940 VFA ladder
Pos	Team	Pld	W	L	D	PF	PA	PP	Pts
1	Williamstown	20	16	4	0	2400	1768	135.7	64
2	Port Melbourne (P)	20	14	6	0	2368	1952	121.3	56
3	Prahran	20	14	6	0	2246	1919	117.0	56
4	Preston	20	14	6	0	2106	1959	107.5	56
5	Brunswick	20	13	7	0	2101	1772	118.6	52
6	Coburg	20	12	7	1	1965	1720	114.2	50
7	Northcote	20	9	10	1	1967	2032	96.8	38
8	Camberwell	20	7	13	0	2250	2319	97.0	28
9	Brighton	20	7	13	0	1980	2118	93.5	28
10	Yarraville	20	7	13	0	2019	2548	79.2	28
11	Oakleigh	20	5	15	0	1888	2391	79.0	20
12	Sandringham	20	1	19	0	1753	2545	68.9	4

Rules for classification: 1) points; 2) percentage; 3) number of points for.
(P) Premiers

=== Finals ===
	Semifinals
Saturday, 14 September	Prahran 16.26 (122)	def.	Preston 17.11 (113)	Toorak Park (crowd: 8,000)
Saturday, 21 September	Williamstown 13.14 (92)	def. by	Port Melbourne 24.14 (158)	Toorak Park (crowd: 12,000)

	Preliminary Final
Saturday, 30 September	Williamstown 11.16 (88)	def. by	Prahran 15.21 (111)	Toorak Park (crowd: 8,000)

1940 VFA Grand Final
Saturday, 5 October	Port Melbourne	def.	Prahran	Melbourne Cricket Ground (crowd: 30,882)
4.8 (32); 11.12 (78); 17.18 (120); 23.22 (160)	Q1; Q2; Q3; Final	2.5 (17); 9.7 (61); 12.8 (80); 17.11 (113)	Umpires: Hayes
Freyer 12, Hurley 5, Robertson 4, Castles, Lahiff	Goals	Lyons 9, Hawkins 3, O'Donnell 2, White 2, Gravell

== Awards ==
- Ted Freyer (Port Melbourne) was the leading goalkicker for the season, kicking 133 goals in the home-and-home season and 157 goals overall.
- This season, the Recorder Cup and the Association Medal, which had been parallel best and fairest awards for the Association since 1933, were merged into a single award; both trophies still existed, but they were both awarded to the same winner based on the voting system which had previously been used for the Association Medal. Brighton captain-coach Jack Davis, in his sixteenth and final season of senior football, was the winner for 1940, polling 38½ votes. Lance Collins (Coburg) was second with 34 votes, and Alby Morrison (Preston) was third with 31 votes.
- Coburg won the seconds premiership for the fourth consecutive season. Coburg 14.16 (100) defeated Brunswick 15.5 (95) in the Grand Final, played as a curtain raiser to the seniors Grand Final on Saturday 5 October at the Melbourne Cricket Ground.

== Notable events ==
- Association clubs continued to aggressively recruit star players from the Victorian Football League, with the agreement between the two competitions relating to player transfers having ended in 1938. In one of the Association's highest profile recruiting coups of all time, Williamstown recruited Collingwood's Ron Todd, who had won the League goalkicking in both 1938 and 1939 and was thought to be one of the best full forwards that the League had ever seen. With Todd in the team, Williamstown's membership increased from less than 1,000 to around 2,500, and ground record crowds saw Todd play at Yarraville Oval (for Todd's first Association game) and at Preston.
- Following Brunswick's six-point victory against Northcote on 8 June, Northcote protested the result on the basis that the timekeepers had rung the bell to end the third quarter ten minutes early. The match was declared void, and in the replay on 20 July, Brunswick 16.13 (109) defeated Northcote 14.16 (100) by nine points.
- In the final round of home-and-home matches, Prahran 2.10 (22) trailed Brighton 11.8 (74) by 52 points at three-quarter time; then, with the aid of a strong wind, kicked ten goals to one in the final quarter to win 12.16 (88) to 12.9 (81). As of 2023, it remains the largest three-quarter time deficit overcome for victory in VFA/VFL history, and the come-from-behind win saw Prahran stay ahead of Brunswick and in the final four.

== See also ==
- List of VFA/VFL Premiers
