= 1938 VFA season =

1938 VFA premiership season
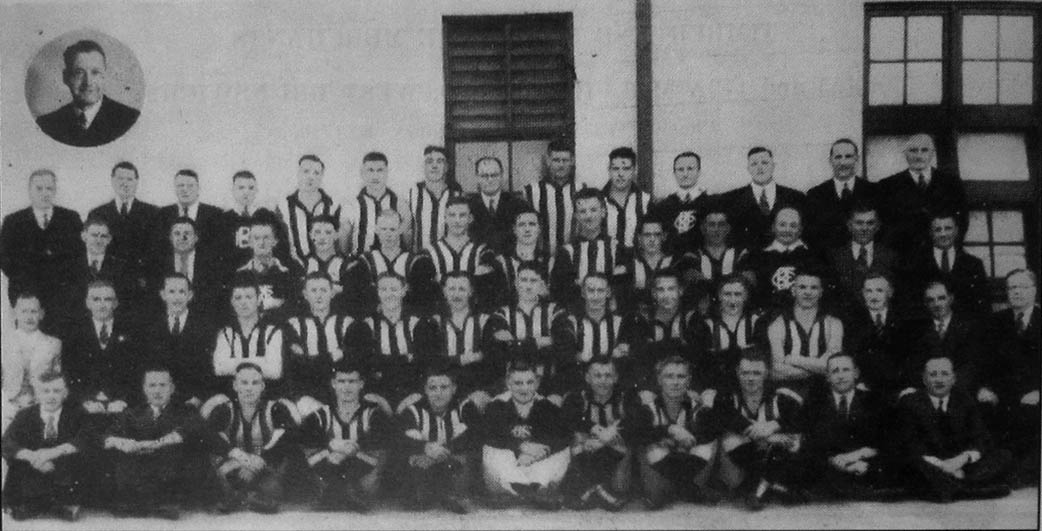
- Brunswick FC, premiers
- Teams: 12
- Premiers: Brunswick; 3rd premiership
- Minor premiers: Brunswick; 4th minor premiership

The 1938 Victorian Football Association season was the 60th season of the Australian rules football competition. The premiership was won by the Brunswick Football Club, after it defeated Brighton by 33 points in the Grand Final on 20 August. It was the club's third VFA premiership, and the last top division premiership it ever won.

The season saw the Association introduce some innovative new rules – most notably allowing the football to be thrown in general play.

== Rule changes ==
The Association and football in general had been declining in popularity over the previous few years. The Association decided to introduce a series of rule changes in an attempt to make the game more spectacular and reverse this trend. The Association made four key rule changes:

Throwing the ball

The most dramatic change was that Association players were now permitted to throw the ball in general play, provided the throw was with two hands and the player's hands were kept below shoulder height. The decision to legalise the throw-pass, as it became known, was a bold one, as throwing had been illegal in the code for the whole of its nearly 80-year history. The Association's decision had two key justifications based on perceived problems with the style of play during the 1930s:

- The "flick pass" had become a legal and common style of handpass, but its execution blurred the lines between a legal handpass and an illegal throw, leading to confusion and inconsistency on how it was policed by umpires. Legalising the throw-pass overcame this problem by eliminating any doubts regarding legality.
- Play was regularly slowed down by scrimmages which resulted from players dropping the ball when tackled, often in an attempt to win a holding-the-man free kick. Legalising the throw-pass gave players a means of disposing of the ball which was faster and required less skill to execute effectively, which largely prevented the formation of scrimmages and made the game much faster and more open.

Altogether, the change was intended to make the game more attractive for the spectator, and to consequently improve public interest in the game.

The effect that the throw-pass had on speeding up the game was immediately praised by football writers, and the rule became quite popular. The Bendigo Association, Sale District Football Association and Tasmania's North Western Football Association all elected to adopt the same rule into their competitions during 1938, and other country leagues, such as the Wimmera District League, considered doing likewise.

Holding the ball

In addition to allowing the throw-pass, the Association modified the rules relating to holding-the-ball to prevent scrimmages. Under the rule, a player would be penalised if he held or dropped the ball after being tackled, but not if he kicked, handpassed or threw the ball away.

Out of bounds

The out of bounds rule was modified such that the boundary umpire would throw the ball back into play after the ball went out of bounds – unless the umpire deemed that the ball had been forced out deliberately, in which case a free kick was paid.

This change was, in fact, a return to a more popular set of rules which had prevailed in Victoria prior to 1925. Since 1925, all ANFC-affiliated leagues had been required to play rules under which a free kick was awarded against the last team to play the ball before it went out of bounds under any circumstances; this followed a decision which was passed by a large majority at the ANFC in 1924, but which was opposed by Victoria (represented in the ANFC by the Victorian Football League). The ANFC rules never gained wide popularity in Victoria, and many were glad to see a return to the old rules.

This change opened the wings and flanks up to more play. Under the ANFC rules, play had in general been much more direct down the centre of the field to avoid the risk of turning over possession by putting the ball out of bounds, but the return of the boundary throw-in made playing down the boundary lines less of a risk.

Downfield free kicks

The Association introduced a provision for what is today known as a 'downfield free kick'. Under the rule, if a player is fouled after disposing of the ball, a free kick is awarded at the spot where the kick, handpass or throw-pass lands, to the nearest team-mate.

=== Response of other competitions ===
At the end of 1938, the Australian National Football Council considered whether or not to adopt the Association's new rules into the national rules. It rejected the throw-pass, but adopted the Association's out-of-bounds rule and holding the ball rules, meaning that all of the major state leagues adopted them from 1939.

=== Relationship with the VFL ===
The Association's changes caused a wider division in administrative control of the game in Victoria. League and Association football were no longer considered to be the same code, resulting in a division similar to that which still exists between rugby league and rugby union. Any competitions adopting the Association's rules could not be affiliated with the ANFC; in the case of provincial Victorian leagues, they were forced to leave the ANFC-affiliated Victorian Country Football League.

As a result of its actions, the Association no longer had any formal relationship with the ANFC-affiliated Victorian Football League. In particular, the permit agreement which had existed between the two competitions since 1931 was terminated, meaning that the competitions were no longer compelled to recognise the validity of the other's transfer clearances, opening the possibility for Association clubs to recruit and field League players without obtaining a clearance, and vice versa. The highest profile League footballer recruited to the Association in 1938 was South Melbourne captain Laurie Nash, considered to be one of the League's finest players, who was recruited by Camberwell; other high-profile transfers in 1938 included Terry Brain, Ted Freyer and Tommy Lahiff. From a footballing perspective, players who switched leagues without a clearance were suspended from the League for a number of years, but were not prevented from playing in the Association; from a legal perspective, League players had a standard clause in their contract which gave the League the grounds to seek an injunction against the switch, but the League was ultimately unsure whether or not the clause would hold up in court and decided not to proceed with legal action.

This period of division between League and Association football existed from 1938 until 1949. It ultimately ended in 1950, when the Association was given a seat on the ANFC.

== Premiership ==
The home-and-home season was played over sixteen matches, before the top four clubs contested a finals series under the Page–McIntyre system to determine the premiers for the season.

=== Ladder ===
1938 VFA ladder
Pos	Team	Pld	W	L	D	PF	PA	PP	Pts
1	Brunswick (P)	16	15	1	0	1865	1303	143.1	60
2	Brighton	16	11	4	1	1653	1469	112.5	46
3	Northcote	16	11	5	0	1719	1339	128.4	44
4	Prahran	16	11	5	0	1892	1503	125.9	44
5	Camberwell	16	9	7	0	1790	1711	104.6	36
6	Preston	16	8	8	0	1487	1539	96.6	32
7	Coburg	16	7	9	0	1520	1659	91.6	28
8	Port Melbourne	16	6	9	1	1552	1655	93.8	26
9	Sandringham	16	5	11	0	1543	1776	86.9	20
10	Oakleigh	16	5	11	0	1416	1652	85.7	20
11	Yarraville	16	5	11	0	1520	1797	84.6	20
12	Williamstown	16	2	14	0	1332	1886	70.6	8

Rules for classification: 1) points; 2) percentage; 3) number of points for.
(P) Premiers

=== Finals ===
	Semifinals
Saturday, 30 July	Northcote 11.14 (80)	def.	Prahran 9.11 (65)	Brunswick Cricket Ground (crowd: 4,500)
Saturday, 6 August	Brunswick 16.11 (107)	def.	Brighton 10.5 (65)	Toorak Park (crowd: 7,200)

	Preliminary Final
Saturday, 13 August	Brighton 12.19 (91)	def.	Northcote 11.7 (73)	Toorak Park (crowd: 5,200)

1938 VFA Grand Final
Saturday, 20 August	Brunswick	def.	Brighton	Toorak Park (crowd: 20,000)
8.3 (51); 10.4 (64); 15.12 (102); 19.17 (131)	Q1; Q2; Q3; Final	3.3 (21); 7.12 (54); 12.12 (84); 14.14 (98)
Bailey 4, McInnes 3, Dowling 3, Boyd 2, Challenger 2, McKay 2, Crawford, Gardner, Quinn	Goals	Fitcher 3, Connell 2, Morgan 2, Opray 2, Penny 2, Dean, N. Egan, Tanner

== Awards ==
- Ted Freyer (Port Melbourne) was the leading goalkicker for the season, kicking 86 goals to finish five goals ahead of Laurie Nash (Camberwell).
- In the parallel Association best and fairest awards:
  - Arthur Cutting (Williamstown) and Bill Downie (Northcote) jointly won the Recorder Cup, each polling four votes. R. Quinn (Brunswick), W. Johnson (Prahran) and Frank 'Dickie' Dowling (Preston) finished equal third with three votes apiece.
  - The Association Medal, a parallel best and fairest award, was won by Arthur Cutting (Williamstown), who polled 26 votes; Dowling (Preston) was second with 24 votes, and E. Penny (Brighton) was third with 23 votes.
- Coburg won the seconds premiership. Coburg 18.11 (119) defeated the previously undefeated Port Melbourne 9.11 (65) in the Grand Final on Saturday 20 August at Preston.

== Notable events ==
- In their match on April 30, Brighton defeated Preston by one point; but, due to a scoreboard error, all present at the ground believed that the match had been drawn. The Association introduced a protocol for goal umpires to confirm the accuracy of the displayed score at the end of each quarter.
- The Association initially resolved to play the Grand Final at the Brunswick Cricket Ground, overlooking Olympic Park and Toorak Park because of their proximity to venues staging League matches on the same day (the Melbourne Cricket Ground and St Kilda Cricket Ground respectively). However, after Brunswick qualified for the Grand Final, Brighton lodged an official complaint to the VFA and issued an ultimatum – unless the Association moved the Grand Final to a neutral venue, they would forfeit the match. The Association upheld Brighton's complaint, and both clubs agreed to move the match to Toorak Park.

== See also ==
- List of VFA/VFL premiers
