= Lance Collins =

Australian rules footballer and coach

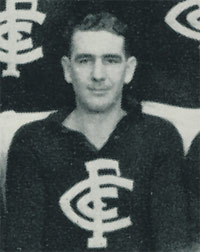
- Collins during his Carlton career

Personal information
- Full name: Lance Kitchener Collins
- Born: 19 June 1916; Beulah, Victoria
- Died: 3 January 1988 (aged 71); St Kilda, Victoria
- Original team: Coburg
- Debut: 23 May 1942, Carlton vs. Essendon, at Windy Hill

Playing career^{1}
Years	Club	Games (Goals)
1942–1943, 1945	Carlton	33 (78)
- ^{1} Playing statistics correct to the end of 1945.

Career highlights
- Carlton leading goalkicker – 1945 (49 goals)

Lance Kitchener Collins (19 June 1916 – 3 January 1988) was a leading Australian rules footballer of the 1940s, playing for Carlton Football Club in the Victorian Football League (VFL).

Born in Beulah, Victoria, Collins joined Victorian Football Association (VFA) club Coburg in 1935 and played 98 games for them, kicking 432 goals (including 116 goals in 1936), a club goal kicking record.

Called "a fine athlete with a big leap and strong hands... a precise kick for goal, and a deadly snapshot on the run", Collins spurned offers from numerous VFL clubs and was appointed captain-coach of Coburg in 1940. He led Coburg to the 1941 VFA grand final which they lost to Port Melbourne by 19 points.

Coburg went into recess in 1942 due to World War II and Carlton recruited Collins in a wartime permit. Wearing guernsey number four, Collins made his VFL debut in round 3 1942 against Essendon at Windy Hill, kicking one goal.

Collins played nine games in 1942, kicking 13 goals, and had played a further seven games, kicking 16 goals in 1943 before enlisting in the Australian Army on 22 June 1943. Collins was posted to 53 Australian Bulk Issues Petroleum and Oil Depot Platoon, gaining the rank of Staff Sergeant. Initially based in Buna, Papua New Guinea the 53rd BIPOD Platoon was part of the 4th Base Sub Area, supporting the Bougainville campaign.

Returning to Australia in 1945, Collins sought to continue playing for Carlton in the 1945 VFL season rather than return to Coburg, which Coburg initially refused and it was not until well into the season, after intense negotiations, that Coburg granted a transfer, and Collins was immediately named in the centre in Carlton's league side.

Collins kicked six goals in their round 10 match against North Melbourne, which was said to "galvanise the side" and led ultimately to the 1945 premiership. Collins continued to play well throughout the season in either the forward line or on the ball and, known as a big game player, Collins was particularly important for Carlton in the 1945 finals series. He kicked eight goals in the first semi-final against North Melbourne (garnering the praise "His pace and anticipation in the final was electric") and four goals in the Preliminary Final against Collingwood.

Collins lined up on a half forward flank for Carlton's victory in the 1945 VFL grand final but tore tendons in his ankle early in the first quarter and, although he remained on the ground with his ankle strapped, played little further part in the match before being replaced at half-time.

Club leading goalkicker in 1945 with 49 goals, Collins left the VFL to accept a coaching position with Tasmanian Football League side Sandy Bay, which he took to a premiership in 1946. He later accepted a coaching position with Ballarat Football League side Golden Point Football Club. At Golden Point there is evidence that Collins invented the checkside punt during the late 1940s, two decades before it was first used in the VFL.

Collins was named vice-captain in Coburg's Team of the Century.
