= 1942 VFA season =

1942 VFA premiership season
- Premiers: Premiership not contested

The 1942 Victorian Football Association season was not played owing to World War II, which was at its peak at the time.

== Abandonment of the season ==
World War II commenced in Europe in September 1939, but the Association continued with a full program of football in the 1940 and 1941 seasons – with the sole exception that Sandringham had competed as an amateur club in the latter season.

By 1942, the state of war had increased, and was now being fought against Japan in the Pacific, as well as against the Axis powers in Europe. Enlistments had reduced the number of able-bodied men available to play football, the war effort had reduced the number of men able to commit time to running the football clubs in an administrative capacity, and the military had already commandeered North Port Oval and Beach Oval and was potentially going to commandeer Point Gellibrand, the Coburg City Oval and Brunswick Oval.

Despite this, Northcote, Coburg, Brunswick, Yarraville, Brighton and Oakleigh wanted to play the season at the VFA’s April meeting, but Preston, Williamstown, Prahran, Camberwell, Port Melbourne and Sandringham had doubts or were outright against playing. On 20 April, the Association board of management decided to cancel the premiership season for 1942. It is believed that had the season been played, no more than six of the twelve clubs would have been able to field a team. The seconds premiership was also cancelled. The Association premiership was not staged again until 1945, although the seconds competition re-commenced in 1944.

With the Association in recess, two of its grounds were used by League clubs whose grounds had been commandeered: Footscray played its games at Yarraville Oval, and St Kilda played its games at Toorak Park.
