= George Hawkins (footballer) =

Australian rules footballer and cricketer

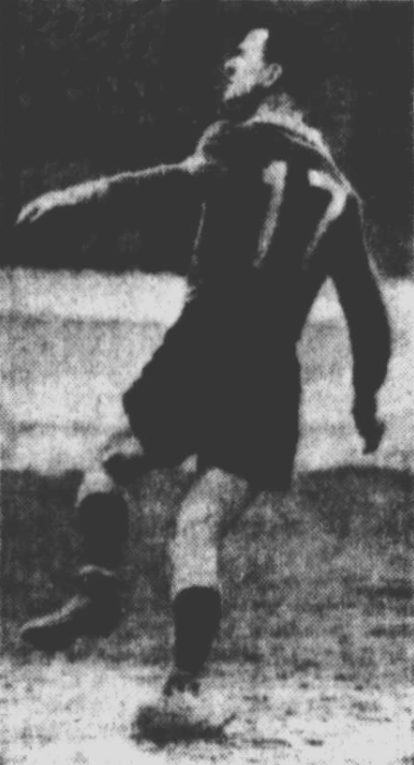

Personal information
- Born: 7 December 1908; Brunswick, Victoria
- Died: 20 July 1979 (aged 70); Chiltern, Victoria
- Position: Forward

Playing career^{1}
Years	Club	Games (Goals)
1932–1946	Prahran	151 (657)
- ^{1} Playing statistics correct to the end of 1947.

George William Hawkins (7 December 1908 – 20 July 1979) was an Australian rules footballer who played with Prahran in the Victorian Football Association (VFA).

Hawkins was a full-forward and centre half-forward for Prahran during the 1930s. He began his senior career in 1932, and became a prolific goalkicker during the era. He scored his first century of goals in the 1934 season, kicking 107 goals. He was a premiership player with Prahran in 1937, and kicked six goals in that season's Grand Final. In 1939, Hawkins kicked a new Association record of 164 goals and was the VFA leading goalkicker for the only time in his career; his record surpassed Western Australian George Doig's national senior record of 152 goals, although Hawkins' claim to the record was disputed because the VFA, having introduced the throw-pass rule in 1938, was no longer considered to be playing the national code.

Hawkins retired during the 1940 season due to ongoing difficulties with an ankle injury; at this stage, he had a career total of 596 goals. But, he returned to play in September that same year, and was still with the club in 1946, leading the club as captain its Association rules exhibition match in Broken Hill following that season. After he retired altogether, he had played a total of 151 games and kicked 657 goals for Prahran.

Hawkins also played cricket in summer during his career. He played one first-class match for Victoria against Tasmania in Launceston in 1933/34, and played 59 district cricket matches for the Prahran Cricket Club.

== See also ==
- List of Victoria first-class cricketers
