= Yarraville Football Club =

Australian rules football club (VFA)

Names
- Full name: Yarraville Football Club
- Nickname(s): Villains, Eagles

Club details
- Founded: 1 April 1903; 122 years ago
- Dissolved: 1984; 42 years ago
- Colours: Red Blue
- Competition: VFJA (1903–1927); VFA (1928–1984)
- Premierships: VFA (2): 1935; 1961; VJFA (7): 1905; 1908; 1909; 1912; 1920; 1925; 1926
- Ground: Yarraville Oval

Uniforms
Home

The Yarraville Football Club, nicknamed the Eagles, was an Australian rules football club based in the Melbourne suburb of Yarraville. It founded in 1903 and competed in Victorian Football Association (VFA) from 1928 until going into recess in 1984.

The club's home ground, Yarraville Oval, is now used by the Yarraville Seddon Eagles, but the modern-day club is not considered part of the Yarraville Football Club lineage.

== History ==
=== VJFA (1903–1927) ===
Yarraville was formed on 1 April 1903, and joined the Victorian Junior Football Association (VJFA), where it was highly successful. Between 1905 and 1913, the club missed the Grand Final only once, and won a total of four premierships: in 1905, 1908, 1909 and 1912. The 1912 premiership came after a controversial final: Yarraville had lost to Port Melbourne Railway United by three points, but protested that the goal umpire had erred in awarding one of Railway's goals in the second quarter; the protest was upheld and the game was awarded to Yarraville. Railway was the minor premier and still had the right to challenge for the premiership, but declined to challenge as its own act of protest, resulting in Yarraville winning the premiership.

At the end of the 1911 VFA season, the Preston Football Club left the VFA. Under VJFA rules, all clubs had to have a reserves alignment to a VFA team, and Yarraville was forced to align with the new Melbourne City Football Club. Both clubs retained their name, colours and home ground, although the VJFA dropped the requirement for a reserves alignment in 1913.

Yarraville won three more premierships during its time in the association – in 1920, and back-to-back in 1925 and 1926. Overall, it won seven premierships – the most of any club in the Association's history – and finished runners up six times in its 25 years in the competition. It was also the only two-time outright winner of the John Wren Shield, a perpetual premiership trophy which was awarded annually to the VJFA premiers, then permanently to the first team to win it three times; the club received the shield in 1909 and 1926.

=== VFA (1928–1984) ===
Yarraville joined the Victorian Football Association (VFA) senior competition in 1928. Prior to the season, the club merged with the neighbouring VJFA rival, the Kingsville Football Club. In 1935 the club won its first VFA grand final. Its next VFA grand final win was in 1961 the same year the VFA added a division 2. By the mid 70s the club had been relegated to the 2nd division and in 1976 finished last on the ladder. The club struggled for support in Division 2, and in the mid-1970s when Association-wide crowds were averaging more than 4,500, Yarraville still seldom drew more than 1,000 fans to games.

The club's on-field position improved in 1977 thanks to a big sponsorship deal, and Yarraville finished on top of the ladder, but was unable to win the grand final. Yarraville remained a top side in 2nd division until 1980, but its form deteriorated dramatically thereafter. The club moved from Yarraville Oval to Western Oval in 1983, but won only one game across all three grades in the season. Seeing no prospects for lasting viability, the VFA withdrew Yarraville's playing licence in January 1984.

== Present day ==
=== Kingsville and Yarraville Seddon Eagles (1996–) ===
In 1996, Kingsville Football Club in the Western Region Football League took over Yarraville Oval and subsequently changed its name to Yarraville, later merging with nearby Seddon to form the Yarraville Seddon Eagles in 2006. While the current-day Eagles acknowledge the history of the Yarraville Football Club, the original Yarraville is not considered its predecessor club.

== Premierships ==
- Victorian Junior Football Association (7): 1905, 1908, 1909, 1912, 1920, 1925, 1926
- Victorian Football League (2): 1935, 1961
