= 1983 VFA season =

1983 VFA Premiership Season
- Teams: 24

Division 1
- Teams: 12
- Premiers: Preston (3rd premiership)
- Minor premiers: Preston (5th minor premiership)

Division 2
- Teams: 12
- Premiers: Springvale (1st D2 premiership)
- Minor premiers: Brunswick (2nd D2 minor premiership)

The 1983 Victorian Football Association season was the 102nd season of the top division of the Australian rules football competition, and the 23rd season of second division competition. The Division 1 premiership was won by the Preston Football Club, after it defeated Geelong West in the Grand Final on 18 September by seven points; it was Preston's third Division 1 premiership. The Division 2 premiership was won by Springvale; it was the club's first Association premiership, won in only its second season of competition.

== Association membership ==
Two new clubs joined Division 2 for the 1983 season, increasing the size of the lower division to twelve teams. The new clubs were Moorabbin and Berwick. They were the last new clubs to join the competition during the Association era: it was not until the competition had become the Victorian Football League in the 1990s that another new club was admitted. Their admissions brought the total size of the Association to twenty-four clubs for the 1983 season.

=== Moorabbin ===
The Moorabbin Football Club had been formed in 1979 after the neighbouring McKinnon and Bentleigh Football Clubs in the Federal League merged; the amalgamated club had been based at McKinnon, but was known as Moorabbin. It took its name and colours from the former Moorabbin Football Club, which had established itself as one of the Association's dominant clubs from 1951 until 1963, before being expelled prior to the 1964 season for its role in the St Kilda Football Club's move to its home ground, Moorabbin Oval. The newly merged club competed in the Federal League until 1981, after which the league folded, and then played in the South East Suburban Football League in 1982, before being admitted as the second division's eleventh club on 5 October 1982. Although the new club was distinct from the former Moorabbin Football Club, the two clubs shared many personnel and officials, and at its first home game the new club unfurled the former club's 1963 premiership flag – which was never able to be unfurled at a home game due to the club's expulsion.

=== Berwick ===
A successful club in the South West Gippsland Football League, Berwick had played finals for the previous eleven seasons, and was admitted to the second division as the twelfth club on 19 November 1982. The SWGFL did not want to lose Berwick, which was one of its more successful and higher drawing clubs, so it refused to grant its players clearances to join the Association; there was a stand-off between the two competitions, and both the Association and the SWGFL included Berwick in their 1983 fixtures. The Victorian Country Football League, to which the SWGFL belonged, was one of the only football bodies with which the Association still had a valid transfer agreement, and the Association did not wish to jeopardise the relationship, so it refused to issue playing permits to the Berwick playing list in the lead-up to the season.

Berwick consequently took action in the Supreme Court of Victoria, seeking clearance to the Association, and claiming that the VCFL's impedance was an illegal restraint of trade. It was not the only such court action taking place at the time: the landmark case in which Silvio Foschini successfully had the Victorian Football League's zoning and clearance system declared an illegal restraint of trade was going through the courts at the same time. On 30 March – only four days before the season commenced – the court found that the agreement between the Association and the VCFL was valid specifically for cases where a player was transferring from a VCFL club to an Association club, or vice versa; but, it did not cover cases where a player remained at the same club, and the club itself was transferring from the VCFL to the Association. Berwick's playing list was registered by the Association the same day.

=== Association structure ===
No clubs were promoted or relegated between the two divisions for 1983, after the Association had abandoned automatic promotion and relegation in 1981. However, in July 1983, the Association decided to reverse this change, and automatic promotion for the Division 2 premier and relegation for the Division 1 wooden spooner was reintroduced, starting from the end of the season.

The Association executive had expressed an interest in expanding the competition to as many as 30 teams, and splitting the second division into two lower divisions of equal status, but this motion did not proceed to the vote; as a consequence, the size of the Association in 1983, at twenty-four teams, was the largest ever in the Association's history.

== Division 1 ==
The Division 1 home-and-away season was played over eighteen rounds; the top four then contested the finals under the Page–McIntyre system. The finals were played at the Junction Oval.

=== Ladder ===
1983 VFA Division 1 Ladder
Pos	Team	Pld	W	L	D	PF	PA	PP	Pts
1	Preston (P)	18	15	3	0	2479	1584	156.5	60
2	Geelong West	18	14	4	0	2332	1670	139.6	56
3	Port Melbourne	18	13	4	1	2411	1980	121.8	54
4	Sandringham	18	12	6	0	2292	1968	116.5	48
5	Coburg	18	10	7	1	2388	1733	137.8	42
6	Frankston	18	10	7	1	2164	2255	96.0	42
7	Werribee	18	8	10	0	2034	2273	89.5	32
8	Prahran	18	7	10	1	1885	2191	86.0	30
9	Camberwell	18	7	11	0	2029	2224	91.2	28
10	Dandenong	18	6	12	0	1938	2052	94.4	24
11	Williamstown	18	4	14	0	1960	2156	90.9	16
12	Waverley	18	0	18	0	1479	3282	45.1	0

Rules for classification: 1) points; 2) percentage; 3) number of points for.
(P) Premiers

=== Finals ===
	Semi-finals
Sunday, 28 August	Port Melbourne 28.12 (180)	def.	Sandringham 20.14 (134)	Junction Oval (crowd: 9,228)
Sunday, 4 September	Preston 18.15 (123)	def.	Geelong West 15.14 (104)	Junction Oval (crowd: 6,651)

	Preliminary Final
Sunday, 11 September	Geelong West 14.12 (96)	def.	Port Melbourne 6.11 (47)	Junction Oval (crowd: 5,256)

1983 VFA Division 1 Grand Final
Sunday, 18 September	Preston	def.	Geelong West	Junction Oval (crowd: 14,719)
3.4 (22); 6.7 (43); 12.8 (80); 14.10 (94)	Q1; Q2; Q3; Final	2.6 (18); 5.10 (40); 9.11 (65); 12.15 (87)	Umpires: Maurie Stabb, Frank Vergona; Norm Goss Memorial Medal: Geoff Austen (Preston)
Bourke 6, Halas 3, Marcon 2, Brine, Dyseon, Osborne	Goals	Radojevic 5, Murphy 2, Eddy, Gibson, McDowell, Sells, Watt

=== Awards ===
- The leading goalkicker for the season was Mark Fotheringham (Williamstown), who kicked 108 goals during the home-and-away season and did not participate in finals.
- The J. J. Liston Trophy was won by Bill Swan (Port Melbourne), who polled 19 votes. At the time, it was Swan's first Liston Trophy, having finished second on countback the previous year; but it is now recognized as Swan's second consecutive Liston Trophy, after he was jointly awarded the 1982 Liston Trophy following a decision in 1989 to retrospectively eliminate the countback. Swan finished ahead of Fraser Murphy (Geelong West), who polled 16 votes, and Neil Gibson (Geelong West) and Kevin Sait (Williamstown), who polled 13 votes.
- Preston won the seconds premiership. Preston 14.20 (104) drew Frankston 16.8 (104) in the Grand Final, played as a curtain-raiser to the seniors Grand Final on 18 September; then, Preston 18.15 (123) defeated Frankston 12.13 (85) in the Grand Final Replay, held on 25 September at Frankston Park.
- Preston also won the thirds Premiership, giving it the premiership in all three grades for the season. It was the first time any club had achieved the feat in the top division.

== Division 2 ==
Division 2 expanded from ten clubs to twelve clubs in 1983; as had occurred in Division 1 the previous year, the home-and-away season continued to be played over 18 rounds, rather than being expanded to 22 rounds. This meant that not all pairs of teams played both home and away against each other. The top four then contested the finals under the Page–McIntyre system; all finals were played on Sundays at Toorak Park.

=== Ladder ===
1983 VFA Division 2 Ladder
Pos	Team	Pld	W	L	D	PF	PA	PP	Pts
1	Brunswick	18	15	3	0	2896	1498	193.3	60
2	Mordialloc	18	14	3	1	2270	1416	160.3	58
3	Springvale (P)	18	13	5	0	2648	1716	154.3	52
4	Oakleigh	18	13	5	0	2357	1619	145.6	52
5	Box Hill	18	11	6	1	2457	1695	145.0	46
6	Caulfield	18	11	6	1	2292	1616	141.8	46
7	Northcote	18	11	6	1	2378	1760	135.1	46
8	Moorabbin	18	7	11	0	2041	2053	99.4	28
9	Berwick	18	5	13	0	1477	2088	70.7	20
10	Kilsyth	18	3	15	0	1423	2743	51.9	12
11	Sunshine	18	2	16	0	1261	3264	38.6	8
12	Yarraville	18	1	17	0	1250	3284	38.1	4

Rules for classification: 1) points; 2) percentage; 3) number of points for.
(P) Premiers

=== Finals ===
	Semi-finals
Sunday, 21 August	Springvale 20.13 (133)	def.	Oakleigh 18.10 (118)	Toorak Park
Sunday, 28 August	Brunswick 25.15 (165)	def.	Mordialloc 12.8 (80)	Toorak Park

	Preliminary Final
Sunday, 4 September	Mordialloc 12.15 (87)	def. by	Springvale 29.14 (188)	Toorak Park (crowd: 3,000)

1983 VFA Division 2 Grand Final
Sunday, 11 September	Brunswick	def. by	Springvale	Toorak Park (crowd: 4,000)
5.3 (33); 6.7 (43); 11.9 (75); 13.16 (94)	Q1; Q2; Q3; Final	5.3 (33); 10.4 (64); 15.6 (96); 17.9 (111)	Umpires: Phillips, Maurie Stabb
Gumbleton 2, Lawson 2, Radchenko 2, Thornton 2, Toy 2, Judge, Nolan, Sahlberg	Goals	Carroll 4, Anderson 3, Holden 3, Fotiniotis 2, Woodman 2, Brand, Dempster, Dickson
Judge, for striking Steel in the second quarter Hamilton, for attempting to strike Holden in the third quarter Radchenko, for striking Fowler in the third quarter Robertson, for striking Smith in the third quarter Thornton, for striking McComb in the third quarter Thornton, for misconduct that he threatened umpire Stabb in the third quarter	Reports

=== Awards ===
- The leading goalkicker for the Division 2 was Peter Neville (Mordialloc), who kicked 129 goals in the home-and-away season and 135 goals overall.
- The J. Field Medal was won by Terry Walsh (Mordialloc). Matthew Johnson (Berwick) finished second, and Peter Jurgenstein (Northcote) finished third.
- Brunswick won the seconds premiership. Brunswick 10.6 (66) defeated Oakleigh 7.12 (54) in the Grand Final, played as a curtain-raiser to the senior Grand Final on 11 September.

== Notable events ==
=== Interleague matches ===
The Association's Division 1 and Division 2 teams each played one interleague match during the season. Ray Shaw (Preston) captained the Division 1 team and Gary Brice (Port Melbourne) was coach. Colin Hobbs (Northcote) was coach of Division 2.

	1983 Interleague Matches
Sunday, 22 May (C-R)	V.F.A. Second Division 17.19 (131)	def.	S.A.F.A. 8.14 (62)	Beach Oval
Sunday, 22 May	V.F.A. First Division 16.17 (113)	def. by	V.A.F.A. 18.16 (124)	Beach Oval

=== Association Thirds ===
In 1983, the Association reduced the age eligibility of the thirds competition, changing it from an Under-19s competition to an Under-18s competition. The change was intended to encourage young players into the firsts competition at an earlier age, but it had unforeseen detrimental impacts on the thirds competition itself. Neil Bencraft, who had coached the Sandringham Thirds to five premierships in eleven seasons while it was an Under-19s competition, was so dissatisfied with the switch to an Under-18s competition that he retired after only one season of it. Chief among Bencraft's complaints were that the younger players were less disciplined, and due to school commitments were less willing or able to commit to training. Away games were also a particular problem for many clubs, as the younger-aged players generally preferred to play in local junior competitions than travel the often long distances to play an Association away game, particularly as none were old enough to hold driver's licences. Bencraft admitted that he had fielded unregistered players several times during 1983 simply to field a full team, and said that he believed many other clubs had done likewise.

No club was worse affected by the changes to the competition than Geelong West, whose travelling distances for away games exceeded those of any other club. It seldom attracted more than fifteen players to training, and forfeited two games early in the season simply through lack of players. The team's plight reached farcical proportions on 23 July against Williamstown: only twelve players took the field – one fewer and it would have been forced to forfeit – and four had suffered injuries by half time; the match was still played to its full length, and Geelong West lost by 675 points; Williamstown 110.27 (687) d. Geelong West 2.0 (12). It remains the highest score ever recorded in game of Australian rules football, in any league and at any grade. The team had fared little better the previous week, conceding 88.23 (551) against Coburg. Following these two losses, Geelong West withdrew its Thirds team for the rest of the season.

This event highlighted one of the key problems associated with the Association's two-division structure as it applied to the thirds: a club like Geelong West was playing in Division 1 in all three grades based on the strong performances of its Seniors, yet was uncompetitive in the top division at Thirds level due to an inherently different socioeconomic hurdle. To correct for this, the Association abandoned divisions in the thirds competition from 1984: all Thirds teams competed together in the same division at the start of the season, and were later divided based on results during the year.

=== Other notable events ===
- Two Association clubs were given permission to use Victorian Football League venues as home grounds in 1983: Moorabbin, which had its training and administrative base at McKinnon Reserve, played at Moorabbin Oval, sharing it with St Kilda; and Yarraville, which had previously played at Yarraville Oval, played its games at the Western Oval, sharing it with Footscray. It was the first time since 1913, when Essendon and Melbourne City shared the East Melbourne Cricket Ground, that League and Association clubs had played on the same ground. Both deals lasted only for this season: in 1984, Moorabbin moved to McKinnon and Yarraville was expelled from the Association prior to the season.
- On June 19, Oakleigh lost its first game at the Oakleigh Cricket Ground since 1981, ending a 22-game home winning streak.
- During the year, long-time Port Melbourne and Association administrator Norm Goss Sr. died. In his honour, the Association struck the Norm Goss Memorial Medal, to be awarded each year to the best player on the ground in the Division 1 Grand Final.
- In the final round of Division 2 home-and-away games, Oakleigh 26.14 (170) d. Box Hill 20.12 (132) in a match which directly determined which of the two clubs finished fourth and qualified for the finals.
- Port Melbourne qualified for its eleventh consecutive finals series, breaking the record of ten consecutive finals series set by Williamstown from 1953 until 1962.
- Waverley was the first Division 1 club to be held winless in a season since the competition was partitioned in 1961.
- At one stage during the third quarter of the Division 2 Grand Final, Brunswick was reduced to thirteen men on the field after having three players ordered off; five Brunswick players were reported on six charges altogether during the game. One player, Ron Thornton, was ordered off for striking McComb of Springvale; upon being ordered off, he threateningly raised his right fist at field umpire Maurie Stabb, and was reported again. At his VFA honorary commission hearing, Thornton was cleared of striking McComb, but suspended for ten weeks for his misconduct charge.

== See also ==
- List of VFA/VFL premiers
