= 1982 VFA season =

1982 VFA Premiership Season
- Teams: 22

Division 1
- Teams: 12
- Premiers: Port Melbourne (15th premiership)
- Minor premiers: Preston (4th minor premiership)

Division 2
- Teams: 10
- Premiers: Northcote (2nd D2 premiership)
- Minor premiers: Oakleigh (2nd D2 minor premiership)

The 1982 Victorian Football Association season was the 101st season of the top division of the Australian rules football competition, and the 22nd season of second division competition. It was the first season of a restructured two-division competition, in which automatic promotion and relegation between the divisions was abandoned.

The Division 1 premiership was won by the Port Melbourne Football Club, after it defeated Preston in the Grand Final on 19 September by seven points; it was Port Melbourne's 15th Division 1 premiership, the third of three premierships won in a row between 1980 and 1982, and the last of six premierships won in nine seasons from 1974 until 1982. The Division 2 premiership was won by Northcote; it was the club's second Division 2 premiership, and it was the last premiership ever won by the club.

== Association structure ==
=== Restructure of Division 2 ===
In the late 1970s, the popularity and financial viability of the Association was in decline. One factor contributing to this came about as a result of the promotion and relegation system which existed between the two divisions: this system, which had been in place since 1961, saw promotion for the Division 2 premiers and relegation for the Division 1 wooden-spooners at the end of each season, giving a fair opportunity for promotion and relegation based on on-field performance; but, the automatic nature of this promotion and relegation meant that no consideration was given to the off-field strength of the club, which was the most critical factor in determining a club's viability. By the late 1970s, there was a growing off-field gap between the strongest and weakest clubs, and the fickle correlation between off-field strength and on-field finishing positions meant that some strong clubs were stuck in Division 2 and some weak clubs were holding their places in Division 1. This had a wide range of consequences detrimental to the Association as a whole.

The conclusion was that the Association would be more viable if the clubs which made up Division 1 were selected based on off-field merit and viability, rather than on-field results. A new structure, which was first proposed in September 1980 under Alex Gillon's presidency, was ratified in May 1981 under Alan Wickes' presidency by a margin of 19–4, well in excess of the three-quarters majority required. Under the new structure:

- Division 1 was expanded from ten to twelve clubs.
- Division 2 could be expanded to as many as twelve clubs, with the final number depending upon the number of suitable applicants.
- The clubs in Division 1 were selected by the Association executive committee based on the following criteria, in order of importance: quality of administration; financial position; quality of facilities; long-term potential of the club; on-field performance; on-field and off-field reputation; development programs for junior players; local attitudes towards Sunday football.
- Promotion and relegation between the divisions was decided at the end of the season at the discretion of the executive committee, based on the same criteria.
- Automatic promotion and relegation for the Division 2 premiers and the Division 1 wooden spooner was abolished. This lasted only for two seasons, and was reinstated during the 1983 season.

The Association also encouraged a number of its weaker clubs to consider amalgamating with neighbouring clubs to improve long-term viability, although it stopped short of forcing amalgamations. As many as fourteen of the Association's twenty clubs were sent letters on the matter of amalgamation during 1981 – Prahran and Caulfield, Box Hill and Camberwell, and Oakleigh and Waverley were amongst the pairs of clubs known to have been approached – but no amalgamations resulted.

=== Promotion and relegation for 1982 ===
The composition of the new Division 1 was announced on 7 September 1981, the day after the 1981 Division 2 Grand Final. Four Division 2 clubs were promoted to the expanded Division 1 in 1982:

- Camberwell (premiers in 1981), which was enjoying good local support after two Division 2 premierships in three years, and had been secure off-field during its one season in Division 1 in 1980. The club repaid the Association's faith by being one of the strongest crowd-drawing clubs in 1982.
- Waverley (runners-up in 1981). Waverley was considered a surprise promotion by noted Association sportswriter Marc Fiddian, because through the 1970s it was one of the lowest-drawing clubs in the Association, while its nearest neighbour Oakleigh had been one of Division 1's highest drawcards before it was relegated; but, Oakleigh had an increasing Greek migrant population, so its long-term potential was thought to be seriously threatened by soccer, giving Waverley an off-field edge.
- Werribee (fourth in 1981). Once described as "the lonesome battler" of the Association, up to 1980 the outer western suburban club had struggled through its sixteen seasons in Division 2 for one finals appearance and four wooden spoons. However, it was almost at the end of an ambitious five-year plan which saw the club build its finances, improve its on-field performance to reach the finals in 1981, and open a $200k social club in 1980. This off-field strength and potential saw the club promoted to Division 1, and it did not disappoint, attracting a huge crowd of 10,000 to a home game against Port Melbourne in May, and continuing to draw strongly through the year.
- Williamstown (seventh in 1981). Despite fair-to-middling performances in Division 2 since being relegated after the 1977 season, Williamstown (the longest-serving club still in the Association) was still one of the most financially stable and well supported clubs in the lower division.

The changes also helped to spread Division 1 more evenly across Melbourne: Werribee and Williamstown were the first western suburban clubs in Division 1 since 1977, and Waverley's inclusion provided more representation to the sprawling south-eastern suburbs.

Two Division 1 clubs were relegated for 1982:

- Brunswick (tenth in 1981). It had been widely recognised over previous years that Brunswick was one of the clubs worst-affected by an increase in the European migrant population in its locality, and the subsequent inability to compete with soccer; and therefore its long-term potential was not considered strong enough for the restructured Division 1.
- Caulfield (ninth in 1981). Caulfield's case to remain in Division 1 was most affected by the small, poor quality facilities at its home ground at Princes Park.

Two other clubs who were considered for relegation but held their places were: Geelong West, who had gone through but recovered from a severe financial crisis in 1980–81; and Coburg, who, like Brunswick, was suffering from a low fanbase due to demographic shifts in its locality.

== Association membership ==
Two new clubs joined Division 2 for the 1982 season. These were the first new admissions to the Association since Frankston joined in 1966. The new clubs were:

- Springvale – One of the Federal League's strongest clubs, Springvale had long been considered a candidate for Association membership. The club had turned down an offer to join the Association in 1961, and had applied to join in 1978 but been turned down because the Association was not interested in expanding at the time. Springvale was accepted as the ninth club on 16 October 1981.
- Kilsyth – A small club from the outer eastern suburbs, the Kilsyth Cougars had finished last in the second division of the Eastern District Football League in 1981. Kilsyth was admitted as the tenth club on 13 November 1981. Kilsyth is historically considered to be a surprise admission, given its small size and lack of local success. The Association had harboured strategic interests in expanding to the outer eastern suburbs since the mid-1960s, but the larger Ringwood Football Club was usually considered the most likely club to gain admission. Kilsyth hoped that despite being a small club, it would still be able to attract EDFL players from the wider Ringwood and Croydon area who aspired to play in the VFA.

Altogether, seven clubs applied to join, although the identities of the unsuccessful candidates were never formally revealed. North Ballarat, Ringwood and Greensborough were among the clubs speculated to have applied.

The two new clubs brought the total size of the Association to twenty-two clubs, a new record. Division 1 was expanded to twelve clubs, and Division 2 remained constant at ten clubs.

== Division 1 ==
Although Division 1 expanded from ten clubs to twelve clubs, the home-and-away season continued to be played over 18 rounds, rather than being expanded to 22 rounds. This meant that not all pairs of teams played both home and away against each other. The top four then contested the finals under the Page–McIntyre system. The finals were played at the Junction Oval.

=== Ladder ===
1982 VFA Division 1 Ladder
| Pos | Team | Pld | W | L | D | PF | PA | PP | Pts |
|---|---|---|---|---|---|---|---|---|---|
| 1 | Preston | 18 | 16 | 2 | 0 | 2577 | 1654 | 155.8 | 64 |
| 2 | Coburg | 18 | 15 | 3 | 0 | 2388 | 1843 | 129.6 | 60 |
| 3 | Port Melbourne (P) | 18 | 13 | 5 | 0 | 2861 | 2111 | 135.5 | 52 |
| 4 | Geelong West | 18 | 11 | 7 | 0 | 2196 | 2291 | 95.9 | 44 |
| 5 | Camberwell | 18 | 9 | 9 | 0 | 2293 | 2345 | 97.8 | 36 |
| 6 | Prahran | 18 | 9 | 9 | 0 | 2129 | 2293 | 92.8 | 36 |
| 7 | Sandringham | 18 | 8 | 10 | 0 | 2191 | 2273 | 96.4 | 32 |
| 8 | Werribee | 18 | 8 | 10 | 0 | 2371 | 2574 | 92.1 | 32 |
| 9 | Dandenong | 18 | 6 | 12 | 0 | 2086 | 2243 | 93.0 | 24 |
| 10 | Frankston | 18 | 5 | 13 | 0 | 2143 | 2424 | 88.4 | 20 |
| 11 | Williamstown | 18 | 5 | 13 | 0 | 2186 | 2532 | 86.3 | 20 |
| 12 | Waverley | 18 | 3 | 15 | 0 | 1707 | 2545 | 67.1 | 12 |

Source: australianfootball.com
Rules for classification: 1) points; 2) percentage; 3) number of points for.
(P) Premiers

=== Finals ===
| | Semi-finals |
| Sunday, 29 August | Port Melbourne 25.20 (170) | def. | Geelong West 16.12 (108) | Junction Oval (crowd: 6,469) |
| Sunday, 5 September | Preston 17.18 (120) | def. | Coburg 10.12 (72) | Junction Oval (crowd: 8,176) |

| | Preliminary Final |
| Sunday, 12 September | Coburg 18.8 (116) | def. by | Port Melbourne 19.22 (136) | Junction Oval (crowd: 8,452) |

1982 VFA Division 1 Grand Final
Sunday, 19 September | Preston | def. by | Port Melbourne | Junction Oval (crowd: 20,732)
3.3 (21); 8.6 (54); 12.9 (81); 20.14 (134) | Q1; Q2; Q3; Final | 5.9 (39); 7.13 (55); 14.14 (98); 21.15 (141) | Umpires: Ogston, Vergona
Halas 5, Boden 2, Dintinosante 2, McGaw 2, Ohlsen 2, Shaw 2, Vann 2, Austen, McCann, Towan | Goals | Anderson 5, Cook 5, Davies 2, Ebeyer 2, Kavanagh 2, Evans, Rodda, Swan, Tantsis, Wilkinson

=== Awards ===
- The leading goalkicker for the season was Fred Cook (Port Melbourne), who kicked 127 goals during the home-and-away season and 140 goals overall.
- The J. J. Liston Trophy was originally decided by a countback, after three players finished level on 20 votes. Geoff Austen (Preston) originally won the award outright, with five first preferences; Bill Swan (Port Melbourne) was second, with four first preferences and four second preferences; and David Wenn (Dandenong), was third with four first preferences and three second preferences. Following a decision made in 1989, the countback was retrospectively eliminated, and all three players are now recognized as joint Liston Trophy winners.
- Sandringham won the seconds premiership. Sandringham 18.10 (118) defeated Preston 12.15 (87) in the Grand Final, played as a curtain-raiser to the seniors Grand Final on 19 September.

== Division 2 ==
The Division 2 home-and-away season was played over eighteen rounds; the top four then contested the finals under the Page–McIntyre system; all finals were played on Sundays at Toorak Park.

=== Ladder ===
1982 VFA Division 2 Ladder
| Pos | Team | Pld | W | L | D | PF | PA | PP | Pts |
|---|---|---|---|---|---|---|---|---|---|
| 1 | Oakleigh | 18 | 17 | 1 | 0 | 2910 | 1840 | 158.2 | 68 |
| 2 | Northcote (P) | 18 | 14 | 4 | 0 | 2663 | 1851 | 143.9 | 56 |
| 3 | Caulfield | 18 | 12 | 6 | 0 | 2326 | 1694 | 137.3 | 48 |
| 4 | Brunswick | 18 | 12 | 6 | 0 | 2480 | 1891 | 131.1 | 48 |
| 5 | Box Hill | 18 | 10 | 8 | 0 | 2037 | 2131 | 95.6 | 40 |
| 6 | Springvale | 18 | 9 | 9 | 0 | 2553 | 2071 | 123.3 | 36 |
| 7 | Mordialloc | 18 | 8 | 10 | 0 | 2123 | 2160 | 98.3 | 32 |
| 8 | Kilsyth | 18 | 4 | 14 | 0 | 1866 | 2314 | 80.6 | 16 |
| 9 | Sunshine | 18 | 3 | 15 | 0 | 1682 | 3224 | 52.2 | 12 |
| 10 | Yarraville | 18 | 1 | 17 | 0 | 1614 | 3078 | 52.4 | 4 |

Source: australianfootball.com
Rules for classification: 1) points; 2) percentage; 3) number of points for.
(P) Premiers

=== Finals ===
| | Semi-finals |
| Sunday, 22 August | Caulfield 27.14 (176) | def. | Brunswick 15.9 (99) | Toorak Park (crowd: 1,400) |
| Sunday, 29 August | Oakleigh 23.9 (147) | def. by | Northcote 25.20 (170) | Toorak Park (crowd: 3,500) |

| | Preliminary Final |
| Sunday, 5 September | Oakleigh 21.13 (139) | def. by | Caulfield 25.15 (165) | Toorak Park (crowd: 3,700) |

1982 VFA Division 2 Grand Final
Sunday, 12 September | Northcote | def. | Caulfield | Toorak Park (crowd: 6,000)
0.6 (6); 2.9 (21); 9.13 (67); 12.15 (87) | Q1; Q2; Q3; Final | 4.4 (28); 7.9 (51); 9.11 (65); 11.16 (82) | Umpires: Quinn, Fitzpatrick
Jurgenstein 4, Hepburn 3, Jim Christou 2, Dilorio, Minnitt, Smith | Goals | McClennan 3, Guileri 2, Hocking 2, Booth, Lennon, Morrison, Stewart

=== Awards ===
- The leading goalkicker for the Division 2 was Ted Carroll (Springvale), who kicked 118 goals in the home-and-away season and did not participate in finals.
- The J. Field Medal was originally won outright by Mark Williams (Sunshine), who polled 25 votes; Russ Hodges (Kilsyth) was originally second, after also polling 25 votes but finishing behind Williams on countback. Following a decision made in 1989, the countback was retrospectively eliminated, and both players are now recognized as joint Field Medallists. Ted Carroll (Springvale) finished third with 14 votes.
- Springvale won the seconds premiership in its first season. Springvale 16.8 (104) defeated Northcote 15.11 (101) in the Grand Final, played as a curtain-raiser to the senior Grand Final on 12 September.

== Notable events ==
=== Interleague matches ===
The Association's Division 1 and Division 2 teams each played two interleague matches during the season, including the Association's first ever matches against the Victorian Amateur Football Association. Fred Cook (Port Melbourne) captained the Division 1 team and Gary Brice (Port Melbourne) was coach; Jim Christou (Northcote) captained Division 2 against the S.A.F.A., and Russ Hodges (Kilsyth) captained Division 2 against the V.A.F.A. after Christou was unavailable through injury.

| | 1982 Interleague Matches |
| Sunday, 30 May (C-R) | V.F.A. Second Division 13.24 (102) | def. by | S.A.F.A. 18.18 (126) | Beach Oval (crowd: 3,258) |
| Sunday, 30 May | V.F.A. First Division 27.33 (195) | def. | G.N.F.L. 9.9 (63) | Beach Oval (crowd: 3,258) |
| Sunday, 13 June (C-R) | V.F.A. Second Division 20.13 (133) | def. | V.A.F.A. Second XVIII 10.12 (72) | Beach Oval (crowd: 5,548) |
| Sunday, 13 June | V.F.A. First Division 19.17 (131) | def. by | V.A.F.A. First XVIII 23.13 (151) | Beach Oval (crowd: 5,548) |

=== Other notable events ===
- Network Ten did not renew its agreement to televise Association games in 1982. The network had shown live telecasts of Association games over fifteen years from 1967 until 1981, but opted not to continue. One sticking point in the negotiations surrounded the use of a central ground: Network Ten had been keen for the televised game to be played at the same venue each week; the Association arranged for the Junction Oval to be available in this capacity, but Ten worried that the small Association crowds would give a poor atmosphere in such a large venue. Some clubs, including Prahran and Dandenong, struggled to find strong sponsorship after the television deal ended.
- Two field umpires were used in all matches across both the home-and-away season and finals in Division 2 starting from this season. This change had been made in Division 1 in 1981.
- To coincide with the change in umpires, the voting system for the J. J. Liston Trophy and the J. Field Medal were both changed in 1982. Under the new system, the two field umpires conferred after the game, and awarded one set of votes to the best three players on the ground on a 3–2–1 basis.
- On 11 April, Springvale scored more than 200 points in only its second Association game: Springvale 35.15 (225) d. Sunshine 18.17 (125).
- On 11 April, Chris Rourke kicked a goal after the final siren to secure victory for Camberwell against Preston; Camberwell 18.13 (121) d. Preston 17.17 (119).
- In the match between Frankston and Geelong West at Frankston Park on 6 June, Simon Taylor (Geelong West) kicked a very late goal to secure a five-point victory; Geelong West 20.10 (130) d. Frankston 17.23 (125). Frankston argued that Taylor's goal was kicked slightly after the final siren had sounded and lodged an official protest against the result. Frankston contended that controlling umpire Neil Griffith had failed to hear the siren, but non-controlling umpire Frank Vergona had heard the siren and signalled the end of play before the goal was kicked; the two umpires had conferred before awarding the goal. The Association rejected Frankston's protest on the grounds that the umpires acted within the laws of the game by awarding the goal based on their judgement of when the siren had sounded, but it did concede that the goal was probably scored after time had expired, found that the timekeepers should have sounded the siren for longer, and sent a memorandum to all clubs to check the volume of their sirens.
- Yarraville captain-coach John Sharp was reported in five separate matches during the season. On the fourth occasion, on 25 July against Mordialloc, he was suspended for a total of sixteen weeks for kicking and striking an opponent, and for attempting to knock the goal umpire's hat off; and, he was found not guilty of the more serious offences of striking a goal umpire and tripping a field umpire. Two weeks later, while coaching from the boundary line, he was reported again on four charges of using abusive language, and was suspended indefinitely from serving in any position in the Association, ending his career. Sharp had a long history of reports and suspensions, and under his leadership a total of fifteen Yarraville players were reported during the season.
- In the Division 2 preliminary final, Caulfield trailed Oakleigh by as much as eight goals during the third quarter, but recovered to win the match by 26 points.
- At the Division 2 Grand Final, $5000 in cash – amounting to nearly half of the $11,000 gate – was stolen from the Toorak Park rooms. It was never recovered.

== See also ==
- List of VFA/VFL premiers
