= Tocumwal Football Club =

Tocumwal

Names
- Full name: Tocumwal Football Netball Club
- Nickname: Bloods

2022 season
- Home-and-away season: 10th (4-10)
- Leading goalkicker: Duane Haebich (51)
- Best and fairest: Kade Rowe

Club details
- Founded: 1891; 135 years ago
- Colours: Red White
- Competition: Picola & District Football Netball League
- President: Matthew Petersen
- Coach: Kade Rowe
- Premierships: 9
- Ground: Tocumwal Sports Ground (capacity: 12,000)

Uniforms
Home

The Tocumwal Football Netball Club, nicknamed the Bloods, is an Australian rules football and netball club that competes in the Picola & District Football Netball League. The club is based in the town of Tocumwal located in the Riverina district of New South Wales.

== History ==
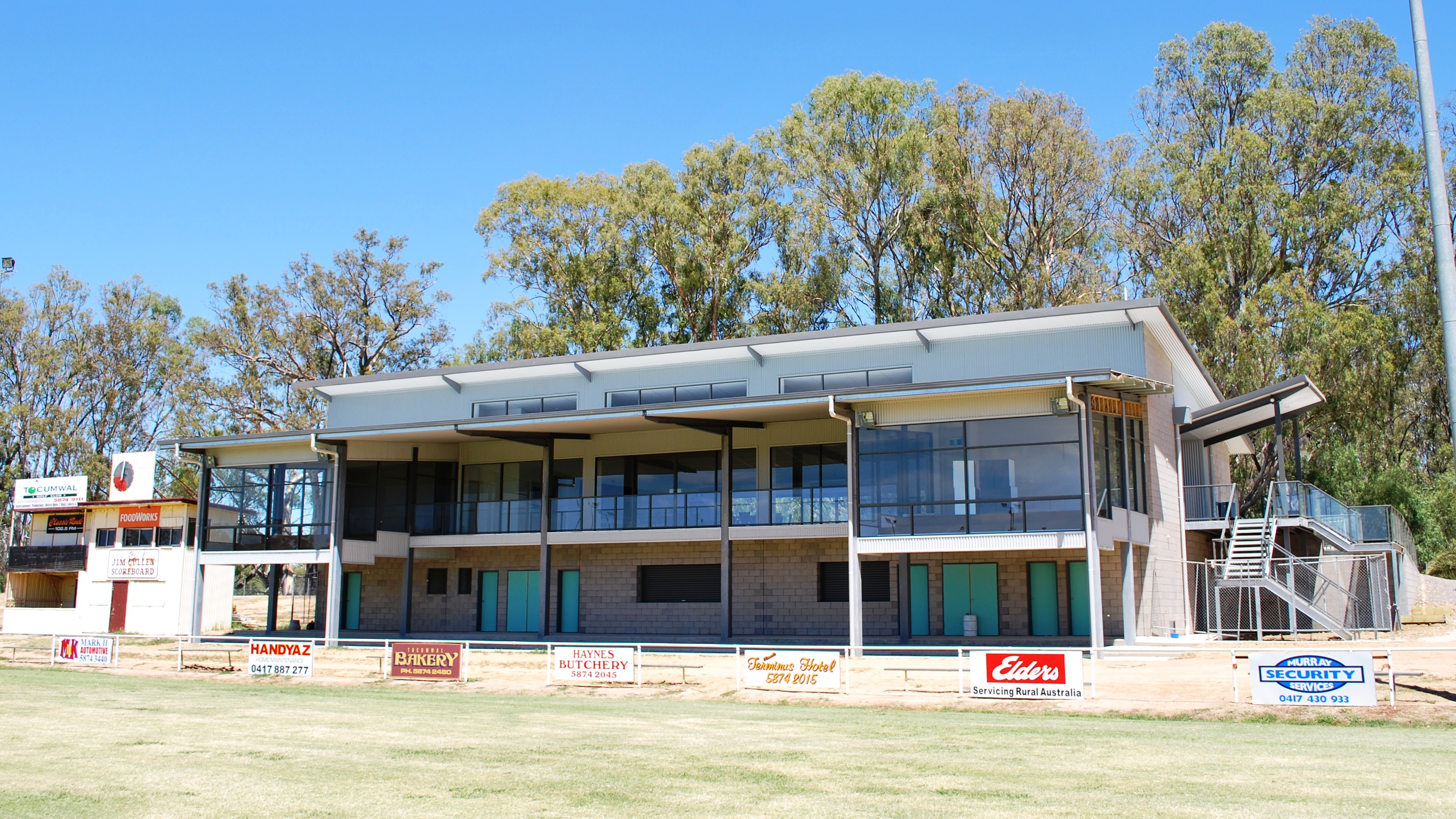
Tocumwal Recreation Reserve Building

Tocumwal FC was established way back in 1891 and played its first recorded match in 1893 against Cobram. Tocumwal played the Murray Border Football Association from 1894 to 1896. They then joined the newly established Federal District Football Association in 1897 and play there until 1902.

Tocumwal played in seven consecutive Southern Riverina Football Association (SRFA) grand finals between 1922 and 1928, but unfortunately they only won the last won in 1928.

Tocumwal won the Southern Riverina JUNIOR FA junior premiership in 1932, defeating Berrigan in the grand final.

Tocumwal Football Club was one of the foundation clubs and played in the Murray Football League from 1931 to 2013. They have won five senior premierships in over their time in the league, with 2009 being their most recent senior premiership in the league and to date.

After struggling in the Murray Football League, Tocumwal went and joined the Picola & District Football Netball League in 2014 where they have won two U/14's premierships in 2017 and 2022. They left the league after the 2022 season when the league disassociated with the AFL. They rejoined the Murray Football League for the 2023 season, however, returned to the Picola League a year later.

== Football competitions timeline ==
Tocumwal Football Club have played in the following football competitions.

- 1894 to 1896: Murray Border Football Association
- 1897 to 1902: Federal District Football Association
- 1903 & 1904: Club in recess.
- 1905: Goulburn Valley Football Association
- 1906: Club pulled out of the GVFA, but did play in some friendly matches.
- 1907: Goulburn Valley Football Association
- 1908: Club pulled out of the GVFA, but did play in some friendly matches.
- 1909: Goulburn Valley Football Association
- 1910 & 1911: Southern Riverina Football Association
- 1912: Goulburn Valley Football Association
- 1913 & 1914: Southern Riverina Football Association
- 1915 – Club active, but did not join any football association due to World War I.
- 1916: Southern Riverina Football Association
- 1917: Club in recess.
- 1918 to 1930: Southern Riverina Football Association
- 1931 to 2013: Murray Football League
- 2014 to 2022: Picola & District Football League
- 2023: Murray Football Netball League
- 2024 to present day: Picola & District Football League

== Football Premierships ==
Seniors

- Murray Border Football Association
  - 1895
- Federal District Football Association
  - 1898
- Southern Riverina Football Association
  - 1911, 1928
- Murray Football League
  - 1935, 1946, 1967, 1991, 2009

Reserves

?

Thirds

?

Fourths

?

== Football – Runners Up ==
Seniors

- Murray Border Football Association (1)
  - 1896
- Southern Riverina Football Association (8)
  - 1914, 1916, 1922, 1923, 1924, 1925, 1926, 1927.
- Murray Football League (8)
  - 1953, 1954, 1956, 1965, 1966, 1989, 1990, 2003.

== VFL / AFL players ==
The following footballers played with Tocumwal prior to playing senior VFL / AFL football, with the year indicating their debut.

- 1928 – Clem Carr – Melbourne
- 1929 – Clarrie Hearn – Essendon. Hearn won the 1929 Stawell Gift too!
- 1934 – Fred De Abel – Hawthorn
- 1950 – Max Jeffers – Melbourne
- 1955 – Jeff Harris – Hawthorn
- 1955 – Allan Jeans – St. Kilda
- 1964 – Julian Vise – Collingwood
- 1984 – Ron Watt – Geelong
- 1984 – Tony Hughes – Sydney Swans
- 1987 – Leon Higgins – Sydney Swans & Hawthorn
- 1995 – Justin Crawford – Sydney Swans & Hawthorn
- 2013 – Matthew Taberner – Fremantle Dockers
