= Darveniza =

Darveniza is a surname. Notable people with the surname include:

- Kaye Darveniza (born 1955), Australian politician
- Paul Darveniza (born 1945), Australian rugby union player
- Trojan Darveniza (1921–2015), Australian rules footballer
