= Mooroopna =

- Town
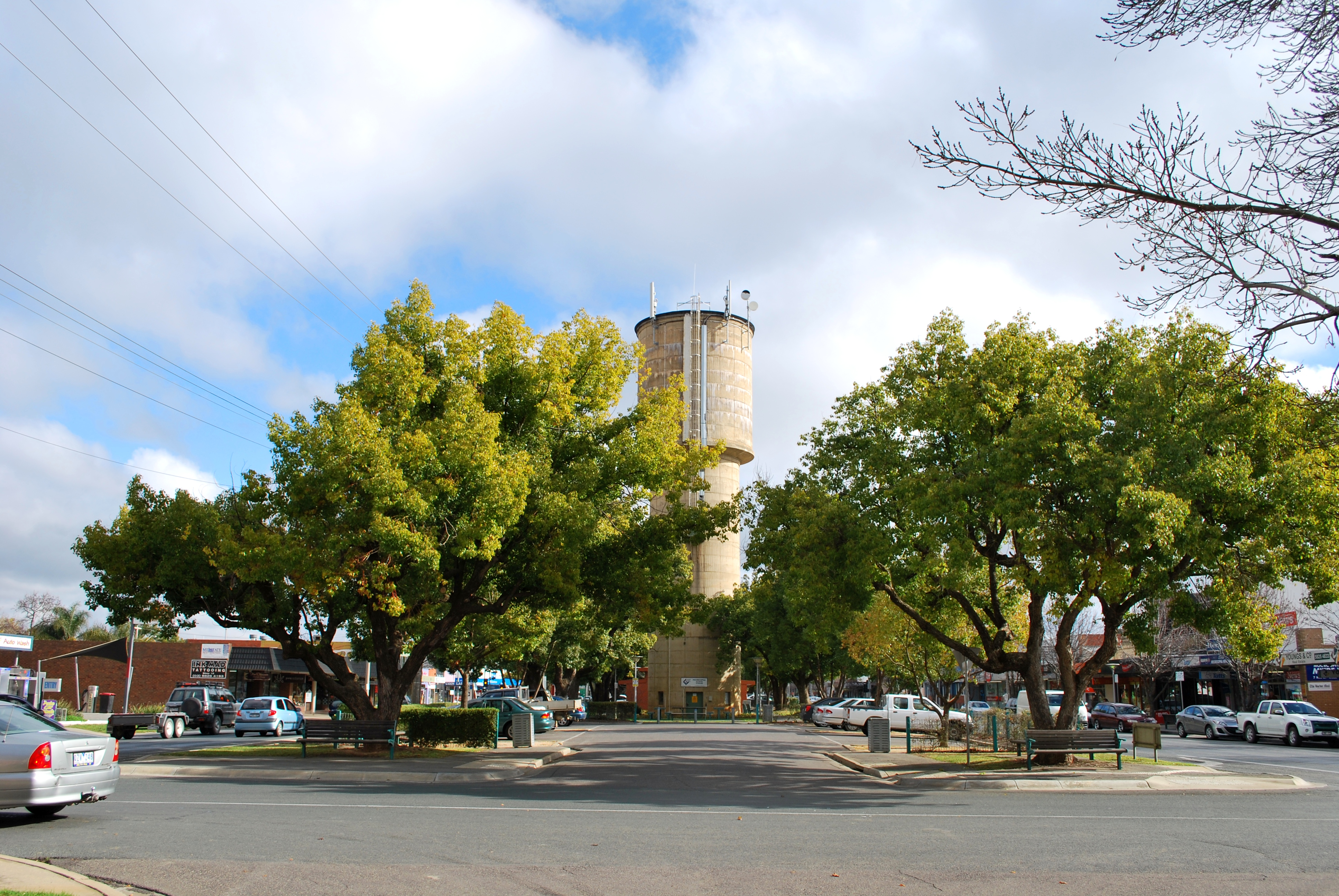
- Main street of Mooroopna

- Interactive map of Mooroopna
- Coordinates: 36°23′S 145°21′E
- Country: Australia
- State: Victoria
- Region: Hume
- LGA: City of Greater Shepparton
- Location: 180 km (110 mi) N of Melbourne; 4 km (2.5 mi) W of Shepparton
- Established: 19 April 1873

Government
  - State electorate: Shepparton
  - Federal division: Nicholls

Area
  - Total: 37.7 km^{2} (14.6 sq mi)
- Elevation: 115 m (377 ft)

Population
  - Total: 8,312 (2021 census)
  - Density: 220.48/km^{2} (571.0/sq mi)
- Postcode: 3629
- County: Rodney
- Mean max temp: 22.4 °C (72.3 °F)
- Mean min temp: 8.8 °C (47.8 °F)
- Annual rainfall: 538.4 mm (21.20 in)
Localities around Mooroopna
Tatura	Mooroopna North	Shepparton
Ardmona	Mooroopna	Shepparton
Tatura East	Toolamba	Kialla

Mooroopna (/məˈruːpnə/ mə-ROOP-nə) is a town located 180 kilometres (112 mi) north of Melbourne, Victoria, Australia. It is on the banks of the Goulburn River opposite the larger town of Shepparton. The Midland Highway crosses the river between the two towns. Mooroopna recorded a population of 8,312 at the 2021 census.

== History ==
The name Mooroopna was used by the original Kaieltheban tribe living in the area and meant 'deep water hole'. This refers to a very deep part of the Goulburn River behind the old Mooroopna Hall. The Kaielthebans (population 50 in 1841) were part of the Yorta Yorta Nation living in the region before the arrival of Europeans.

Two entrepreneurs, Joseph Hawdon and Charles Bonney, camped on the edge of Gemmill's Swamp, close to Mooroopna, in January 1838. They were overlanding large herds of cattle and sheep from an area close to modern Seymour to Adelaide, about 1200 km by bullock dray along the Goulburn and Murray Rivers. Three years later, squatters settled in surrounding areas running sheep on the well-grassed plains. The first settler in the town was William Simmonds Archer who purchased land in 1860 and built his home/hotel in McLennan Street, overlooking the river. He was followed by W. H. Morrell who selected most of the remaining township. Early commerce flowed from revenue gained by punt owners at Shepparton and in Mooroopna, who exploited the traffic from gold fields in Bendigo to those in Beechworth. The post office opened on 19 April 1873.

Mooroopna became a centre for local commerce especially after the beginning of irrigation from the early 1880s. The first school was opened in 1874, the first bank in the same year, the punt in 1875, the Mooroopna Hospital in 1876 and the railway from Seymour in 1880. Like other country towns, Mooroopna became infested with hotels and churches, the influence and numbers of both having declined since the Second World War. Also, like other towns, Mooroopna lost young men to wars in South Africa, Europe and in Asia and has several memorials recording their names.

The Historical Society of Mooroopna was established in 1983 and exists to collect, collate and display items and material relevant to the history of Mooroopna and the surrounding district. The society's museum and gallery is located at 30 Park Street, Mooroopna, the former Grutzner House nursing home, at the rear of the old Mooroopna Hospital.

== Government ==
Mooroopna was originally part of the Shire of Waranga, proclaimed in 1865. With boundary changes it became a riding of the Shire of Rodney in 1886.

Separated only by the Goulburn River from Shepparton, the town resisted many moves for amalgamation, but was forced into union with its larger neighbour in 1994 with the creation of the City of Greater Shepparton. The total population is about 63,269 (30 June 2014), and is expected to increase to 81,378 by 2031. The first councillors were elected in 1997.

Mooroopna is within the Victorian state electoral district of Shepparton and the Federal Division of Nicholls.

== Industry ==
In the beginning, industry revolved around the processing of grains and fruit, but in the past 30 years, Mooroopna has become a desirable residential area for nearby Shepparton.

The town now consists of mainly residential areas, many parks and gardens.

SPC Ardmona closed its Mooroopna processing plant in 2011.

Some industry remains in the town, such a EDP Australia, who manufacture fruit and vegetable packing equipment, Redland fruit have a fruit packhouse in Young Street, packing apples and citrus fruits for supermarkets and export, and Gouge linen have a large industrial laundry in the north of the town.

There are many orchards and dairy farms surrounding the town, and increasingly almonds are becoming a popular crop, with several large almond orchards being established in late 2024.

== Transport ==
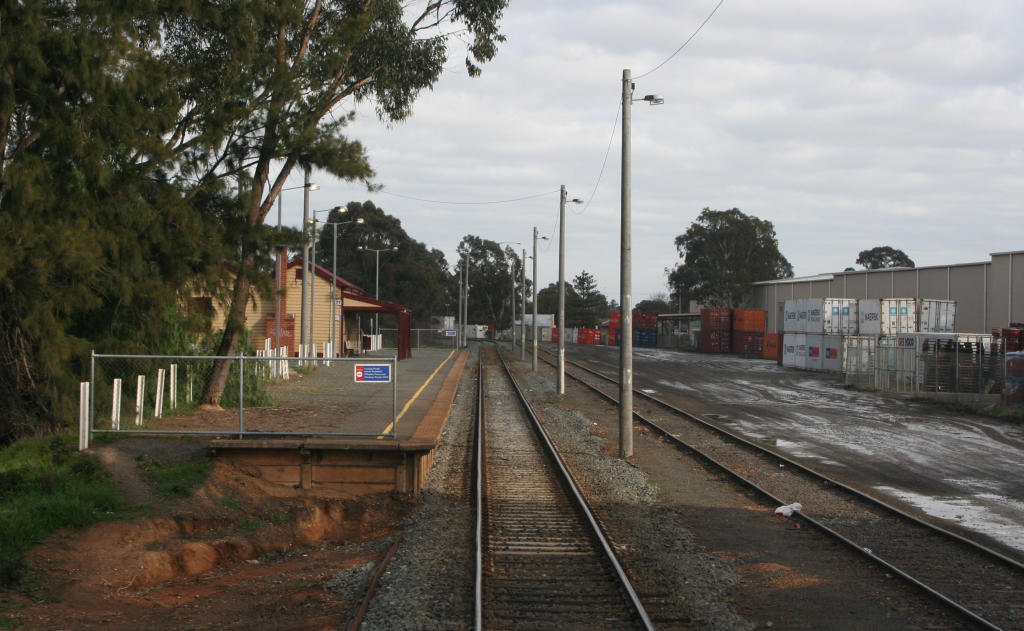
Railway station and container terminal

V/Line services on the Shepparton line stop at the local railway station, which is also served by Pacific National operated container freight services for Patrick PortLink.

== Schools ==
Child Care Centres

- Frank.R.Pullar Children's Centre
- Morrell Street Occasional Care
- World of Learning
- Believe Early Learning
- Apple Blossoms Early Learning

Preschools

- Alexandra Street Kindergarten
- Echuca Road Kindergarten
- Rodney Neighbourhood Kindergarten
- Save the Children Kindergarten
- 54 Reasons Kindergarten

Primary Schools

- Mooroopna Primary School
- Mooroopna Park Primary School
- St Mary's Primary School
- Mooroopna North Primary School

== Community ==
Westside Performing Arts Centre, the home of many school productions by schools throughout the Shepparton area, as well as outside performers, adjoins Mooroopna Secondary. Mooroopna HUB was built in the Centre of the town. Offering a free library, and The Mooroopna Education, Activity and Community Centre (MEAC) which caters for health and wellbeing courses, has regular local Art Exhibitions and rooms to cater for group/club meetings. Mooroopna HUB is a wheelchair and a disability friendly environment.

== Sport ==
During the football season, locals support the Mooroopna Football Netball Club (MFNC Cats), located at the John Gray Oval and competing in the Goulburn Valley Football Netball League. Team colours are navy blue and white. Mooroopna basketball team "The Cats" wear black and red and play in the Greater Shepparton Basketball Association.

Golfers play at the course of the Mooroopna Golf Club.

Other popular sports are Tennis,Lawn bowls,Cricket,Croquet and Rugby league.

== Notable people ==
- Julie Andrews – academic and historian
- Noel Beaton – politician
- Tom Brown – Australian rules footballer
- Emma Cox – sport shooter
- Kaye Darveniza – politician
- Fred De Abel – Australian rules footballer
- Nathan Drummond – Australian rules footballer
- Jack Findlay – motorcycle road racer
- Bill Fulton – politician
- Gail Gago – politician
- Russell and Alan Hawking – country musicians
- Ashley Foley – Australian rules footballer
- Clyde Helmer – Australian rules footballer
- John Helmer – Australian rules footballer
- Clyde Hill – footballer
- Arthur Irvins – Australian rules footballer
- Shadrach Livingstone James – teacher, unionist and Aboriginal activist
- Angus MacIsaac – Australian rules footballer
- Ashley Madison – drag queen
- Geoff Organ – Australian rules footballer
- Bryan Pleitner – Australian rules footballer
- Norm Richards – Australian rules footballer
- Archie Roach – singer-songwriter and Aboriginal activist
- Jy Simpkin – Australian rules footballer
- Fiona Themann – netball player
- Jack West – Australian rules footballer
- Hilda Wiseman – bookplate designer and calligrapher
- Garry Jacobson – Australian motorsports driver
