= Tom Brown (Australian footballer) =

Professional Australian rules footballer

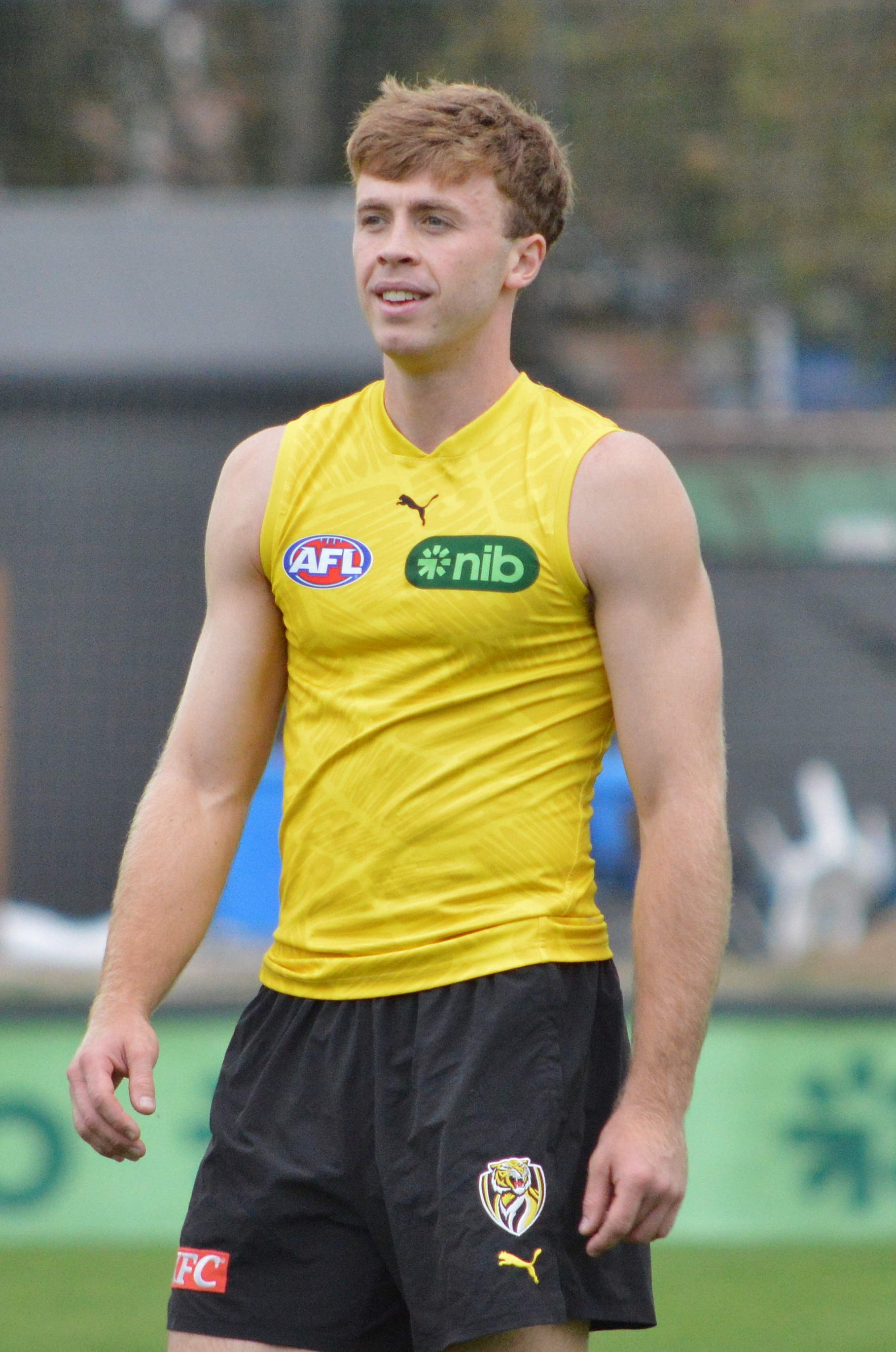
- Brown in March 2026

Personal information
- Born: 30 July 2003 (age 23)
- Original team: Murray Bushrangers (NAB League)/Mooroopna
- Draft: No. 17, 2021 AFL national draft
- Debut: Round 24, 2023, Richmond vs. Port Adelaide, at Adelaide Oval
- Height: 193 cm (6 ft 4 in)
- Weight: 81 kg (179 lb)
- Position: Defender

Club information
- Current club: Richmond
- Number: 30

Playing career^{1}
Years	Club	Games (Goals)
2022–	Richmond	60 (11)
- ^{1} Playing statistics correct to the end of 2026.

Tom Brown (born 30 July 2003) is a professional Australian rules footballer playing for the Richmond Football Club in the Australian Football League (AFL). He was drafted by Richmond with the 17th pick in 2021 AFL draft and made his debut in round 24 of the 2023 season. He is the son of former Geelong AFL player Paul Brown and brother of Geelong and Western Bulldogs AFLW player Millie Brown.

== Early life and junior football ==
Brown grew up in the Victorian country town of Mooroopna and played junior football with the Mooroopna Football Netball Club.

As a teenager, Brown attended and played school football for Geelong Grammar School, as well as for the Murray Bushrangers in the NAB League. His final junior season was significantly interrupted by a serious mid-season syndesmosis ankle injury.

In the final days before the 2021 AFL draft, AFL Media and ESPN both projected Brown to be selected with the 18th pick.

== AFL career ==
Brown was drafted by Richmond with the club's second pick and the 17th selection overall in the 2021 AFL national draft.

He failed to make an AFL debut in 2022, playing instead with the club's reserves side in the VFL.

Brown spent the early months of the 2023 season sidelined by a wrist fracture. He returned to football with 10 matches at VFL level, before being called up to make his AFL debut in the final round of the season.

In the 2024 AFL season, Brown was cruicial in helping Richmond achieve their second win of the season against Adelaide in round 13. The 20-year-old defender, playing just his 12th AFL game, had 16 disposals at 87 per cent efficiency, 10 contested possessions, four marks, a game-high 11 intercepts and 173 metres gained. This performance showcased the improvement Brown had made in his game and earnt the praise of respected AFL football analyst and two-time North Melbourne premiership star David King, “They’ve got a ripper in Tom Brown, he's going to be a beauty, he had 11 intercepts for the night. He's got class, he's got poise, he actually makes the right decision every time. I know he's a beautiful kick and everyone talks about his actual kicking efficiency and his style. But he can kick the ball 50 metres off one or two steps – he’s one of those guys – and he sees things that others don't. I think he's going to be an absolute star. What a steal he is at the selection they got him."

At the beginning of the 2025 AFL season, Brown signed a two-year contract extension to remain a Tiger until at least the end of the 2027 season. During Richmond's round 9 clash against, West Coast, Brown laid a goal-saving tackle to secure Richmond's two-point win. In the dying seconds and with Richmond hanging on to a two-point lead, young Eagles midfielder, Tom Gross ran inside 50 to have a shot on goal, but Brown executed the perfect tackle to find Gross holding the ball and ensure the Tigers won their third match of the season.

== Player profile ==
Brown plays as a medium defender, with a mix of skills including precise disposal at half-back. After being drafted at 186 centimetres tall, Brown grew seven centimetres over the next two years, transforming him from a rebounding half-back into an effective hybrid player.

== Personal life ==
He is the son of former Geelong AFL player Paul Brown and brother of Geelong and Western Bulldogs AFLW player Millie Brown.

== Statistics ==
Updated to the end of round 22, 2026.

Legend
G	Goals	K	Kicks	D	Disposals	T	Tackles
B	Behinds	H	Handballs	M	Marks

Season	Team	No.	Games	Totals							Averages (per game)							Votes
Season	Team	No.	Games	G	B	K	H	D	M	T	G	B	K	H	D	M	T	Votes
2022		30	0	—	—	—	—	—	—	—	—	—	—	—	—	—	—	0
2023	Richmond	30	1	0	0	12	4	16	6	0	0.0	0.0	12.0	4.0	16.0	6.0	0.0	0
2024	Richmond	30	18	4	5	149	76	225	68	17	0.2	0.3	8.3	4.2	12.5	3.8	0.9	0
2025	Richmond	30	23	6	2	235	87	322	104	30	0.3	0.1	10.2	3.8	14.0	4.5	1.3	0
2026	Richmond	30	16	1	3	182	69	251	67	18	0.1	0.2	11.4	4.3	15.7	4.2	1.1	0
Career			58	11	10	578	236	814	245	65	0.2	0.2	10.0	4.1	14.0	4.2	1.1	0
