= Nathan Drummond =

Australian rules footballer

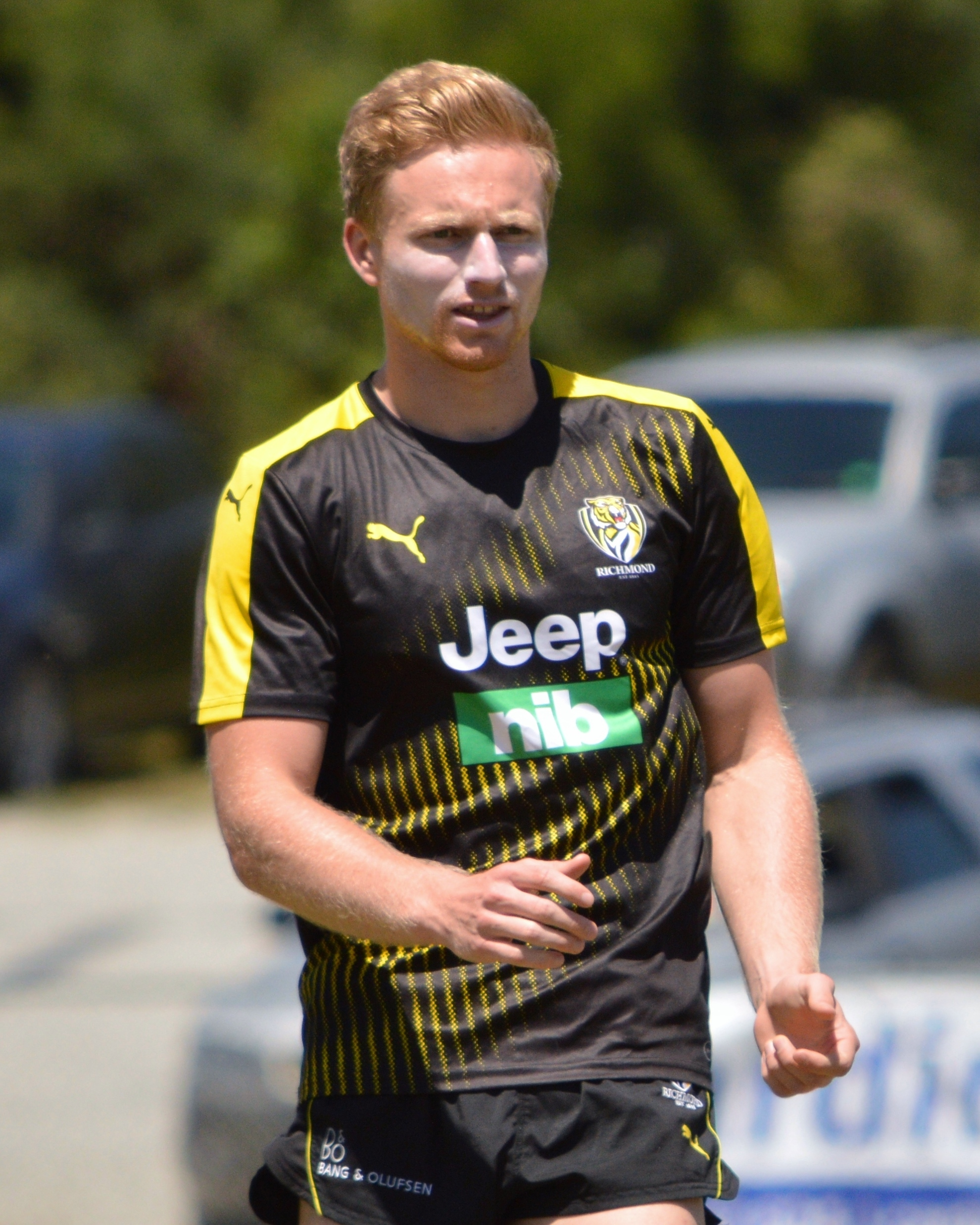
- Drummond with Richmond in January 2018

Personal information
- Born: 19 January 1995 (age 31)
- Original teams: Mooroopna (GVFL); Murray Bushrangers (TAC Cup)
- Draft: No. 52, 2014 national draft: Richmond
- Debut: Round 4, 2015, Richmond vs. Melbourne, at MCG
- Height: 182 cm (6 ft 0 in)
- Weight: 80 kg (176 lb)
- Position: Wing

Playing career^{1}
Years	Club	Games (Goals)
2015–2018	Richmond	5 (2)
- ^{1} Playing statistics correct to the end of the 2018 season.

Nathan Drummond (born 19 January 1995) is a former professional Australian rules footballer who played five matches for the Richmond Football Club in the Australian Football League (AFL) during a four-year stint at the club between 2015 and 2018.

== Early life and junior football ==
Drummond grew up in Mooroopna, a Victorian country town 181 kilometers north of Melbourne. He played junior football with the local Mooroopna Football Club. He attended Notre Dame College, Shepparton.

As a teenager, Drummond moved to Melbourne to board at Melbourne Grammar on an AIEF Scholarship. He travelled home regularly though, including to player with the Murray Bushrangers in the TAC Cup in 2013. He also played for the Victorian Country side that year, representing the team at 2013 National Championships. Despite strong form in his underage years, Drummond passed unselected through the national and rookie drafts in 2013.

In 2014, he returned to the family home in country Victoria, taking up a part-time job at a sports store and playing again for the Bushrangers. Drummond ultimately won the club's best and fairest award for his performances that season. In addition, he played three matches with the Richmond Football Club's VFL side that year.

Drummond impressed at the 2014 draft combine, recording top three results in the repeat sprint, beep test, standing vertical jump, goalkicking and clean hands tests.

== AFL career ==
Drummond was drafted by Richmond with the club's third pick and 52nd selection overall in the 2014 AFL draft.

He made his debut in round 4, 2015 against the Melbourne Football Club. He was stretchered from the ground during the second quarter however, after injuring his right knee in a marking contest. The subsequent diagnosis of a severe anterior cruciate ligament injury resulted in a season ending knee operation.

Drummond returned to football in 2016 through the club's reserves side in the VFL. He made his return at AFL level in round 18 against Hawthorn at the MCG. He kicked his first career goal in the match, as well as recording 10 disposals. He was dropped from senior side following four consecutive matches however and would return to the VFL to play out his year with the reserves. Drummond finished the season with averages of 9.8 disposals and 4.5 tackles per game across his four appearances.

In April 2017 Drummond suffered an injury to his knee while playing with Richmond's reserves side in the VFL. Subsequent scans revealed he had torn his anterior cruciate ligament again, though this time on his left knee. The injury would end his season prematurely for the second time in two years and kept him from playing AFL football that year.

Drummond's second injury rehabilitation progressed faster than with his first knee reconstruction, having completing lengthy running drills by early December 2017. His summer also included a role change, with coaches shifting him into a hybrid forward-midfield position. Initial estimates had Drummond to return to full skills work by the first week of February with a return to full fitness and selection consideration in time for round 1 of the AFL season. He missed this deadline by one week however, making his return through a practice match in the VFL in late March. After five matches at the reserves level Drummond suffered a hamstring strain in a VFL match against Footscray. He missed three matches as a result of the injury before making his return to VFL football in early June. Later that month he suffered a re-occurrence of his earlier hamstring strain while completing a club training session. Drummond returned to training in July but suffered a third hamstring strain in the same location before he could make a return to match play. He spent the back-half of August on light training duties while club officials considered him some chance to return in time for the club's VFL finals series. Drummond's return to full fitness would come too late however, with the club's VFL season ended in the second round of the finals series following consecutive losses to Williamstown and Essendon. He had managed just seven games at the reserves level and did not play an AFL match in 2018. Drummond was delisted at season's end, after a four-year stint at the club that included playing in five AFL matches.

== Statistics ==
Statistics are correct to the end of the 2018 season

Legend
G	Goals	K	Kicks	D	Disposals	T	Tackles
B	Behinds	H	Handballs	M	Marks

Season	Team	No.	Games	Totals							Averages (per game)						
Season	Team	No.	Games	G	B	K	H	D	M	T	G	B	K	H	D	M	T
2015	Richmond	39	1	0	0	4	1	5	1	2	0.0	0.0	4.0	1.0	5.0	1.0	2.0
2016	Richmond	39	4	2	1	13	26	39	14	18	0.5	0.3	3.3	6.5	9.8	3.5	4.5
2017	Richmond	39	0	—	—	—	—	—	—	—	—	—	—	—	—	—	—
2018	Richmond	39	0	—	—	—	—	—	—	—	—	—	—	—	—	—	—
Career			5	2	1	17	24	44	15	20	0.4	0.2	3.4	5.4	8.8	3.0	4.0

== Personal life ==
Drummond is of Indigenous Australian heritage.

He is the great-grandson of Tom Drummond, who played in two premierships for Collingwood and captained the club, and the great-great grandson of William Cooper, an Australian Aboriginal political activist and community leader.
