= 1977 VFA season =

1977 VFA Premiership Season
- Teams: 20

Division 1
- Teams: 10
- Premiers: Port Melbourne (12th premiership)
- Minor premiers: Port Melbourne (11th minor premiership)

Division 2
- Teams: 10
- Premiers: Mordialloc (1st D2 premiership)
- Minor premiers: Mordialloc (1st D2 minor premiership)

Centenary Cup
- Teams: 20
- Champions: Port Melbourne

The 1977 Victorian Football Association season was the 96th season of the top division of the Australian rules football competition, and the 17th season of second division competition. The Division 1 premiership was won by the Port Melbourne Football Club, after it defeated Sandringham in the Grand Final on 25 September by 100 points; it was Port Melbourne's 12th Division 1 premiership, its second in a row, and the third of six premierships won by the club in nine seasons between 1974 and 1982. The Division 2 premiership was won by Mordialloc; it was the first and only Association premiership in either division ever won by the club.

During the season, the Association celebrated the centenary of its foundation in 1877. As part of these celebrations, the Association ran an additional competition called the Centenary Cup, which was a knock-out competition which ran concurrently with the premiership season and featured all twenty clubs from both divisions. The Centenary Cup was won by Port Melbourne.

== Division 1 ==
The Division 1 home-and-away season was played over 18 rounds; the top four then contested the finals under the Page–McIntyre system. The finals were played at the St Kilda Cricket Ground.

=== Ladder ===
1977 VFA Division 1 Ladder
	TEAM	P	W	L	D	PF	PA	Pct	PTS
1	Port Melbourne (P)	18	15	3	0	2325	1871	124.2	60
2	Sandringham	18	13	5	0	2231	2100	106.2	52
3	Coburg	18	11	7	0	2001	1821	109.8	44
4	Brunswick	18	11	7	0	2041	1991	102.5	44
5	Dandenong	18	10	8	0	2005	1734	115.6	40
6	Geelong West	18	10	8	0	2099	2042	102.7	40
7	Prahran	18	7	11	0	1893	2139	88.4	28
8	Caulfield	18	6	12	0	2131	2226	95.7	24
9	Preston	18	5	13	0	1993	2256	88.3	20
10	Williamstown	18	2	16	0	1696	2235	75.8	8
Key: P = Played, W = Won, L = Lost, D = Drawn, PF = Points For, PA = Points Against, Pct = Percentage; (P) = Premiers, PTS = Premiership points								Source	

=== Finals ===
	Semi-finals
Sunday, 4 September	Coburg 27.11 (173)	def.	Brunswick 20.19 (139)	St Kilda Cricket Ground (crowd: 7,496)
Sunday, 11 September	Port Melbourne 23.28 (166)	def.	Sandringham 18.7 (115)	St Kilda Cricket Ground (crowd: 14,793)

	Preliminary Final
Sunday, 18 September	Sandringham 15.23 (113)	def.	Coburg 16.6 (102)	St Kilda Cricket Ground (crowd: 9,189)

1977 VFA Division 1 Grand Final
Sunday, 25 September	Port Melbourne	def.	Sandringham	St Kilda Cricket Ground (crowd: 29,664)
6.4 (40); 13.10 (88); 18.14 (122); 23.19 (157)	Q1; Q2; Q3; Final	2.2 (14); 3.4 (22); 3.8 (26); 7.15 (57)	Umpires: Graeme Marcy
Cook 9, Rasmussen 5, Christou 4, Holt 3, Clark 2	Goals	Simms 2, Clark, Giles, Kennedy, Laube, Lyons

=== Awards ===
- The leading goalkicker for the season was Fred Cook (Port Melbourne). Cook kicked a total of 155 goals in Association games during the year: 107 in home-and-away matches, 18 in two finals matches and 30 in four Centenary Cup matches. He also kicked twelve goals in two Ardath Cup matches for a senior total of 167 for the year.
- The J. J. Liston Trophy was won by Bill Thompson (Dandenong), who polled 56 votes. Thompson finished ahead of: Terry Wilkins (Sandringham), who finished second with 41 votes; Barry Nolan (Brunswick), who polled 27 votes but was ineligible after being suspended in the final round; and Graeme Austin (Prahran), Graeme Cliff (Caulfield) and Gary Davidson (Caulfield), who were equal third with 23 votes apiece.
- Sandringham won the seconds premiership. Sandringham 20.11 (131) defeated Coburg 15.17 (107) in the Grand Final, played as a stand-alone match on Saturday 17 September.
- Caulfield won the lightning premiership. Caulfield 4.7 (31) defeated Dandenong 4.3 (27) in the Grand Final, played as a curtain-raiser to the senior Grand Final on Sunday 25 September.

== Division 2 ==
The Division 2 home-and-away season was played over eighteen rounds; the top four then contested the finals under the Page–McIntyre system; all finals were played on Sundays at Toorak Park.

=== Ladder ===
1977 VFA Division 2 Ladder
	TEAM	P	W	L	D	PF	PA	Pct	PTS
1	Mordialloc (P)	18	14	4	0	2362	1698	139.1	56
2	Yarraville	18	14	4	0	2269	1634	138.8	56
3	Camberwell	18	14	4	0	2265	1819	124.5	56
4	Oakleigh	18	13	5	0	2354	1934	121.7	52
5	Frankston	18	11	7	0	2388	2061	113.4	44
6	Northcote	18	8	10	0	2060	1927	106.9	32
7	Werribee	18	6	12	0	1851	2247	82.3	24
8	Sunshine	18	5	13	0	1902	2204	86.2	20
9	Waverley	18	5	13	0	1769	2234	80.3	20
10	Box Hill	18	0	18	0	1450	2289	50.1	0
Key: P = Played, W = Won, L = Lost, D = Drawn, PF = Points For, PA = Points Against, Pct = Percentage; (P) = Premiers, PTS = Premiership points								Source	

=== Finals ===
	Semi-finals
Sunday, 21 August	Camberwell 25.12 (162)	def.	Oakleigh 11.13 (79)	Toorak Park (crowd: 8,735)
Sunday, 28 August	Mordialloc 15.15 (105)	def. by	Yarraville 19.20 (134)	Toorak Park (crowd: 8,616)

	Preliminary Final
Sunday, 4 September	Mordialloc 16.9 (105)	def.	Camberwell 12.15 (87)	Toorak Park (crowd: 5,432)

1977 VFA Division 2 Grand Final
Sunday, 11 September	Yarraville	def. by	Mordialloc	Toorak Park (crowd: 7,300)
5.2 (32); 10.6 (66); 11.9 (75); 14.11 (95)	Q1; Q2; Q3; Final	5.5 (35); 10.11 (71); 12.14 (86); 19.19 (133)	Umpires: Bill Torney
Gibson 4, Bisset 3, Grandin 3, Wellington 2, Lowe, Sait	Goals	Neville 8, Deaton 4, Norris 2, Scott 2, Bloomfield, Guy, Johnston

=== Awards ===
- The leading goalkicker for Division 2 was Garry Hammond (Camberwell) who kicked 129 goals across the entire season, including finals and Centenary Cup matches.
- The J. Field Medal was won by Derek King (Oakleigh), who polled 67 votes. King's 67 votes in just eighteen games, at a huge average of 3.7 votes per game, was a new record for an Association best and fairest award, beating Des Fothergill's 62 votes for the Recorder Cup and Association Medal in 1941; and, it was King's second best and fairest award in three years, having won the J. J. Liston Trophy in 1975 and placed second for it by one vote in 1976. King polled more than double the votes of Kevin Sait (Yarraville), who finished second with 30 votes, and Gary Guy (Frankston), who finished third with 27 votes.
- Yarraville won the seconds premiership. Yarraville 22.22 (154) defeated Sunshine 14.19 (103) in the Grand Final played as a stand-alone match on Saturday, 17 September at Northcote Park.

== Centenary Cup ==
As part of celebrations of the centenary of the Association's foundation in 1877, the Association held a special once-off tournament called the Centenary Cup. The competition was a knock-out tournament featuring all twenty clubs from both divisions, and it was held concurrently with the premiership season. To accommodate the competition, the VFA season began in March, its earliest start ever. The competition was scheduled as follows:

- The qualification round featured the bottom eight clubs from Division 2, based on 1976 finishing results. This round was held on Sunday 27 March, prior to the start of the season.
- The round of sixteen, featuring the four Division 2 qualifiers and the remaining twelve clubs, was held on Sunday 22 May, in a designated week's break in both divisions' premiership schedules.
- The quarter finals were scheduled to be played Sunday 3 July, which was a week's break in the Division 1 season but not the Division 2 season. Frankston was the only Division 2 club to progress to the quarter-finals, and its match was moved to the following Wednesday night.
- The semi-finals were played on successive Wednesday nights with no interruption to the premiership season. The matches were held at the South Melbourne Cricket Ground which, other than the VFL-owned VFL Park which had only just been upgraded with light towers and to which the Association did not have access, was still Melbourne's premier night football venue.
- The grand final was played on Sunday, 14 August in a week's break in Division 1 premiership matches.

Port Melbourne won the competition, giving it a double of the premiership and Centenary Cup for the season. It was a comfortable 71-point winner against Caulfield in the grand final. An official best-on-ground award was presented in the Grand Final to Fred Cook, who kicked 12.4 in Port Melbourne's dominant victory.

	Qualification round
Sunday, 27 March	Yarraville 23.16 (154)	def.	Northcote 3.2 (20) ^{Note}	Yarraville Oval
Sunday, 27 March	Camberwell 25.12 (162)	def.	Waverley 11.11 (77)	Camberwell Sports Ground
Sunday, 27 March	Frankston 12.22 (94)	def.	Sunshine 10.19 (79)	Frankston Park
Sunday, 27 March	Werribee 19.17 (131)	def.	Box Hill 10.10 (70)	Chirnside Park

	Round of sixteen
Sunday, 22 May	Preston 18.10 (118)	def. by	Caulfield 18.11 (119) ^{Note}	Preston City Oval
Sunday, 22 May	Oakleigh 10.12 (72)	def. by	Brunswick 16.24 (120)	Oakleigh Cricket Ground
Sunday, 22 May	Geelong West 17.16 (118)	def.	Mordialloc 16.20 (106)	Western Oval
Sunday, 22 May	Port Melbourne 22.32 (164)	def.	Werribee 7.19 (61)	North Port Oval
Sunday, 22 May	Dandenong 20.19 (139)	def.	Camberwell 13.12 (90)	Shepley Oval
Sunday, 22 May	Frankston 21.22 (148)	def.	Sandringham 19.13 (127)	Frankston Park
Sunday, 22 May	Yarraville 15.12 (102)	def. by	Prahran 18.9 (117)	Yarraville Oval
Sunday, 22 May	Coburg 23.19 (157)	def.	Williamstown 15.7 (97)	Coburg City Oval

	Quarter-finals
Sunday, 3 July	Brunswick 8.10 (58)	def. by	Dandenong 10.9 (69)	Gillon Oval (crowd: 1,500)
Sunday, 3 July	Caulfield 17.14 (116)	def.	Geelong West 15.16 (106)	Princes Park (crowd: 1,250)
Sunday, 3 July	Port Melbourne 13.9 (87)	def.	Coburg 9.12 (66)	North Port Oval (crowd: 4,500)
Wednesday, 6 July (7:30pm)	Prahran 31.13 (199)	def.	Frankston 11.13 (79)	Toorak Park (crowd: 500)

	Semi-finals
Wednesday, 3 August (7:45pm)	Port Melbourne 20.17 (137)	def.	Prahran 7.9 (51)	South Melbourne Cricket Ground (crowd: 1,954)
Wednesday, 10 August (7:45pm)	Caulfield 18.15 (123)	def.	Dandenong 13.8 (86)	South Melbourne Cricket Ground (crowd: 982)

1977 VFA Centenary Cup grand final
Sunday, 14 August	Port Melbourne	def.	Caulfield	Toorak Park (crowd: 3,000)
6.6 (42); 13.10 (88); 21.11 (137); 26.16 (172)	Q1; Q2; Q3; Final	3.2 (20); 6.4 (40); 8.8 (56); 15.11 (101)	Umpires: Stabb; Best on ground: Fred Cook
Cook 12, Holt 5, Christou 4, Bond 2, Anderson, Critch, Evans	Goals	O'Sullivan 7, Haywood 2, Milner 2, Sutherland 2, Booth, Einsiedel

== Notable events ==
=== NFL Night Series ===
In 1977, the NFL Night Series competition, known as the Ardath Cup, was to have been contested by clubs from the VFL, SANFL and WANFL, and state representative teams from the minor states – with the competition again running mostly on Tuesday nights, and in a knock-out form. However, plans were disrupted when the VFL opted to withdraw its clubs from the competition and establish its own rival night series. To make up the shortfall of teams, the NFL invited the top four Association clubs from 1976 – Port Melbourne, Dandenong, Preston and Caulfield – to participate in the competition. It was the first time that the Association had participated in an ANFC/NFL competition in any capacity since 1969, when a clearance dispute between the Association and the League led to the Association's expulsion from the council. As was normal for interleague matches, the Association clubs were forced to play under the national standard 18-a-side rules in these matches.

Port Melbourne progressed the furthest in the competition, reaching the quarter-finals. The Association clubs results were:

- Port Melbourne, as the top qualifier, advanced directly to the second round; it then defeated Queensland by 31 points, then lost to Norwood by 70 points.
- Dandenong defeated Central District by 9 points, then lost to East Perth by 11 points.
- Preston defeated New South Wales by 27 points, then lost to East Fremantle by 69 points.
- Caulfield lost its only game against the Australian Capital Territory by 19 points.

=== Interleague matches ===
The Association played one interleague representative match during the season, on Queen's Birthday weekend against Queensland – the same state that Port Melbourne had earlier beaten in Ardath Cup competition. Midway through the third quarter of the match, the Association held a comfortable 41-point lead, Association 12.14 (86) vs Queensland 6.9 (45); but, Queensland recovered to kick eight of the last nine goals of the match, and won the match by seven points.

	1977 Interleague Matches
Sunday, 12 June	Queensland 14.18 (102)	def.	V.F.A. 13.17 (95)	Gabba

=== Other notable events ===
- In the final quarter of its Centenary Cup qualification match on 27 March, Northcote brought a replacement player onto the ground while the injured David Wall was still on the arena, albeit on a stretcher. Yarraville then called for a head count, leaving Northcote with too many men on the ground; as a result, Northcote's progress score of 12.17 (89) was cancelled. Yarraville, which had been leading by a few goals and was already looking likely to win the game, ultimately recorded a very lop-sided 134-point win as a result of the penalty.
- In their Centenary Cup match on 22 May, Caulfield and Preston were tied on 18.10 (118) apiece at the end of regulation time. Play continued under sudden death extra time, until a behind by Lou Milner secured victory for Caulfield.
- On 24 July, three separate Division 1 games were decided by one-point margins: Port Melbourne 20.22 (142) d. Prahran 21.15 (141); Sandringham 16.15 (111) d. Preston 16.14 (110); and Dandenong 11.9 (75) d. Williamstown 10.14 (74).
- In the final round of the Division 2 home-and-away season, the match between Oakleigh and Frankston directly determined which club finished fourth. To reach the finals, Frankston need to win by a large margin to overcome a percentage gap, and it started well, leading 9.5 (59) to 1.3 (9) by fifty points at quarter time to sit provisionally in the top four; but Oakleigh recovered strongly to win the game by 52 points and hold fourth place.
- Mordialloc won the Division 2 minor premiership from Yarraville by the narrow margin of only 0.3%pts; in real terms, four extra behinds during the season would have delivered Yarraville the minor premiership.
- For the second time in five seasons, Box Hill was winless in Division 2. Box Hill lost all twenty matches it played across the premiership season, Centenary Cup and lightning premiership.
- In the Division 1 preliminary final, Sandringham held a comfortable 57-point lead during the third quarter, 13.20 (98) vs 6.5 (41) before Coburg mounted a strong comeback in the final quarter. Coburg closed the margin to four points with ten of the next eleven goals, but Sandringham kicked the final goal and held on for an 11-point win.

== See also ==
- List of VFA/VFL premiers
