= John Christou =

Australian rules footballer

Personal information
- Full name: John Christou
- Born: 11 March 1955 (age 71)
- Original team: Heidelberg
- Height: 175 cm (5 ft 9 in)
- Weight: 76 kg (168 lb)

Playing career^{1}
Years	Club	Games (Goals)
1975–1977	Fitzroy	7 (1)
- ^{1} Playing statistics correct to the end of 1980.

John Christou is a former Australian rules footballer, who played for the Fitzroy Football Club in the Victorian Football League (VFL).

A back pocket, Christou played seven games over three seasons for Fitzroy. He later crossed to the Victorian Football Association, playing in premierships with Port Melbourne and Northcote. He played 53 matches for Port Melbourne throughout his career.

Christou is younger brother to Jim Christou, who also played at Fitzroy, Port Melbourne and Northcote. The brothers played many matches together across the three clubs.
