= David Wall (footballer) =

Australian rules footballer

Personal information
- Full name: David Alister Wall
- Born: 3 September 1947 (age 79)
- Original team: West Heidelberg
- Height: 193 cm (6 ft 4 in)
- Weight: 85 kg (187 lb)

Playing career^{1}
Years	Club	Games (Goals)
1967–1976	Fitzroy	132 (120)
- ^{1} Playing statistics correct to the end of 1976.

David Wall (born 3 September 1947) is a former Australian rules footballer who played with Fitzroy in the Victorian Football League (VFL). He joined the team at age 19 and retired at the age of 28. His jersey numbers were 9 and 33.

Originally from West Heidelberg, Wall played much of his football as a forward. He topped Fitzroy's goal-kicking in 1974 with 35 goals.

He was the 852nd player to appear with Fitzroy, played the 63rd most games, and kicked the 35th most goals within the club.

He played at Northcote after leaving Fitzroy but was forced into retirement when he twice suffered concussion in the space of three games. On one occasion during the Centenary Cup in 1977 against Yarraville, Northcote brought his replacement onto the ground before Wall had been taken off on a stretcher; Yarraville called for a head count, and Northcote's score was cancelled.
