= Bryan Pleitner =

Australian rules footballer

Personal information
- Full name: Bryan Anthony Pleitner
- Born: 9 December 1945 (age 80); Mooroopna
- Original team: Kyabram
- Height: 187 cm (6 ft 2 in)
- Weight: 87 kg (192 lb)

Playing career^{1}
Years	Club	Games (Goals)
1965–68	Footscray	28 (7)
1968	Hawthorn	1 (0)
1969–1972	West Perth	63 (9)
- ^{1} Playing statistics correct to the end of 1968.

Career highlights
- West Perth Premiership player: 1969 1971

Bryan Pleitner (born 9 December 1945) is a former Australian rules footballer who played with Footscray and Hawthorn in the Victorian Football League (VFL) and for West Perth in the West Australian Football League (WAFL).Midland Football (WAFA Sunday League) 1973 1974 (Undefeated Premiership ) 1975. Fairest Best 1974 Runner up 1975. Chairman match committee Perth Football Club (WAFL) 1977 (Premiership year) 1978 1979.Awarded life membership West Perth Football Club 2024.
