= Julian Vise =

Australian rules footballer

Personal information
- Full name: Julian Vise
- Born: 28 January 1945
- Original team: Tocumwal
- Height: 178 cm (5 ft 10 in)
- Weight: 76 kg (168 lb)
- Position: Midfield

Playing career^{1}
Years	Club	Games (Goals)
1964	Collingwood	5 (3)
- ^{1} Playing statistics correct to the end of 1964.

Julian Vise is a former Australian rules footballer who played with Collingwood in the Victorian Football League (VFL).
