= Leon Higgins =

Australian rules footballer

Personal information
- Born: 27 June 1968 (age 58)
- Original team: Tocumwal (MFL)
- Height: 178 cm (5 ft 10 in)
- Weight: 80 kg (176 lb)

Playing career^{1}
Years	Club	Games (Goals)
1987–1995	Sydney	121 (80)
1996	Hawthorn	1 (0)
Total		122 (80)
- ^{1} Playing statistics correct to the end of 1996.

Leon Higgins (born 27 June 1968) is a former Australian rules footballer who played with the Sydney Swans and Hawthorn in the Australian Football League (AFL).

A red headed left footer, he was usually seen at the half forward line.

He represented New South Wales against Queensland at the Sydney Cricket Ground, 12 May 1992.

In February 1997, Higgins would join runner Shane Naylor to play for a Melbourne team in the 1997 Rugby League World Sevens tournament. The Melbourne team failed to win a match.

Higgins played 79 games with the Wodonga Football Club, debuting with them in 1999.

Before playing league football he played at Tocumwal, a club which he went onto coach in 2005 and 2006. winning the club best and fairest award in 2005.

Higgins coached the Victorian Country Under 16 side in 2015.

Higgins coached the Murray Bushrangers in the NAB League for three seasons from 2016 to 2018.
