= Clyde Helmer =

Australian rules footballer

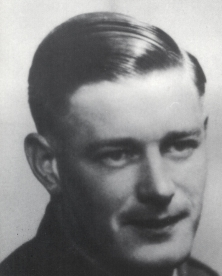

Personal information
- Full name: Reginald Clyde Helmer
- Born: 22 April 1916; Mooroopna, Victoria
- Died: 24 April 1945 (aged 29); Aitape, New Guinea
- Original team: Mooroopna
- Height: 184 cm (6 ft 0 in)
- Weight: 80 kg (176 lb)

Playing career^{1}
Years	Club	Games (Goals)
1937–1941	Geelong	71 (137)
1942	Melbourne	2 (3)
Total		73 (140)
- ^{1} Playing statistics correct to the end of 1942.

Reginald Clyde Helmer (22 April 1916 – 24 April 1945) was an Australian rules footballer who played for Geelong and Melbourne in the Victorian Football League (VFL).

== Family ==
The son of Nils Helmer (1882–1967), and Eva May Helmer (1887–1971), née Hill, Reginald Clyde Helmer was born at Mooroopna on 22 April 1916. He was the nephew of Reginald Valentine Hill, D.S.O., the cousin of Fred Hawking, and the uncle of Geelong footballer John Helmer.

He married Marjorie Mary Frances Gibson (1919–1983), later Mrs. Maurice Steeth, in 1944.

== Football ==
A forward, Helmer could torpedo punt on either foot.

=== Geelong (VFL) ===
In 1937 he played a centre half-forward in the Geelong Second XVIII team that won the Second's premiership.

In 1938, just his second league season, topped Geelong's goalkicking with 74 goals. In a game that year against Fitzroy he kicked a career best eight goals.

=== Interstate Team (VFL) ===
On 29 July 1939 he played at centre half-forward for Victoria against South Australia.

=== Melbourne (VFL) ===
He crossed to Melbourne in 1942 but could only manage two games.

=== South Sydney Football Club (NSWFL) ===
In 1944 he played for the South Sydney Australian Football Club in the New South Wales Football League.

== Military service ==
During World War II Helmer was a Temporary Warrant Officer in the Australian Army and lost his life in New Guinea after a bomb he was trying to defuse exploded.

== Remembered ==
On 5 May 1945, a minute's silence was observed in Helmer's memory before the match between the South Sydney and RAAF teams at Trumper Park Oval in Paddington, New South Wales.

== See also ==
- List of Victorian Football League players who died on active service
