= Angus MacIsaac (footballer) =

Australian rules footballer

Personal information
- Born: 15 April 1900; Mooroopna, Victoria
- Died: 23 June 1944 (aged 44); Euroa
- Original teams: Assumption College, Mooroopna
- Debut: 1922, Richmond vs. Carlton
- Height: 187 cm (6 ft 2 in)
- Weight: 79 kg (174 lb)

Playing career^{1}
Years	Club	Games (Goals)
1922–1924, 1926–1927	Richmond	59 (22)
- ^{1} Playing statistics correct to the end of 1927.

Angus MacIsaac (15 April 1900 – 23 June 1944) was an Australian rules footballer who played in the VFL between 1922 and 1924 and then again in 1926 and 1927 for the Richmond Football Club.

Angus MacIsaac was a follower who played 59 games for the Tigers between 1922 and 1927. After commencing with the Tigers midway through the 1922 season, MacIsaac established himself in 1924 as one of the stars of the team playing every game. His efforts won him Richmond's most improved player trophy. He played in two final series but unfortunately the Tigers finished second in both years (1924 and 1927). MacIsaac had a great leap and a tremendous reach, which made him a very effective ruckman. At 187 cm, MacIsaac was the tallest player on the Richmond list for most of his career. He is believed to be the first Assumption College Kilmore old boy to play league football.

However, MacIsaac is most widely remembered as one of the two players over whom great debate raged in 1924. The debate was about whether one could continue to play football in the VFL and the mid-week country competitions after the VFL introduced a poorly drafted rule midway through that season. Collingwood protested against Richmond including MacIsaac and fellow Goulburn Valley player McCaskill in the team that defeated the Magpies in the second last round. While the protest was dismissed, MacIsaac was ordered to stand out of country football on the eve of the country finals.

After Richmond's season had finished, MacIsaac was persuaded by his country team to play in the grand final for Mooroopna. MacIsaac argued that he was entitled to play as the VFL season had finished and the VFL amended the rule to allow him to play in both competitions before the 1925 season commenced. However, the Permit and Umpire Committee debarred him from playing 'at the pleasure of the Committee' for not following their order.

Various appeals during the 1925 season were either dismissed or ignored and he was only allowed to play football again midway through the 1926 season after significant pressure was placed on the committee by the Tigers and the Goulburn Valley Football League.

MacIsaac played a further 23 games in the 1926 and 1927 seasons. Following the Tigers defeat by the Magpies in the 1927 final, MacIsaac left to become captain–coach of South Bendigo and subsequently Sale before finishing his playing days back as captain of Mooroopna in 1934.

He died when his car was hit by a train near Euroa, Victoria in June 1944.

== Links ==
- 1931 - Mooroopna FC team photo
