= Max Jeffers =

Australian rules footballer

Personal information
- Full name: Max Jeffers
- Born: 14 November 1929
- Died: 29 January 1988 (aged 58)
- Original team: Tocumwal
- Height: 179 cm (5 ft 10 in)
- Weight: 76 kg (168 lb)

Playing career^{1}
Years	Club	Games (Goals)
1950	Melbourne	6 (5)
- ^{1} Playing statistics correct to the end of 1950.

Max Jeffers (14 November 1929 – 29 January 1988) was an Australian rules footballer who played with Melbourne in the Victorian Football League (VFL).
