= John Helmer (footballer) =

Australian rules footballer

John Neil Helmer

Personal information
- Full name: John Helmer
- Born: 19 January 1938; Mooroopna, Victoria
- Died: 14 August 1982 (aged 44); Queenscliff, Victoria
- Original team: Shepparton
- Height: 185 cm (6 ft 1 in)
- Weight: 83 kg (183 lb)
- Position: Utility

Playing career^{1}
Years	Club	Games (Goals)
1956–62	Geelong	50 (22)
- ^{1} Playing statistics correct to the end of 1962.

John Neil Helmer (19 January 1938 – 14 August 1982) was a former Australian rules footballer who played with Geelong in the Victorian Football League (VFL).

== Family ==
The son of Neil William Hans "Larry" Helmer (1912–1972), and Viola Veronica Helmer (1913–2001), née Gallagher, John Neil Helmer was born at Mooroopna, Victoria on 19 January 1938.

He was the nephew of Clyde Helmer.

He married Lesley Lorraine Wray (1940–2014).
