= Arthur Irvine (footballer) =

Australian rules footballer

Personal information
- Full name: Arthur Reynolds Irvine
- Born: 17 February 1926; Mooroopna, Victoria
- Died: 10 February 2006 (aged 79)
- Original team: Mooroopna
- Height: 180 cm (5 ft 11 in)
- Weight: 81 kg (179 lb)

Playing career^{1}
Years	Club	Games (Goals)
1947–1949, 1951	Geelong	48 (40)
- ^{1} Playing statistics correct to the end of 1951.

Arthur Reynolds Irvine (17 February 1926 – 10 February 2006) was an Australian rules footballer who played for the Geelong Football Club in the Victorian Football League (VFL).
