= Jeff Harris (footballer) =

Australian rules footballer

Personal information
- Full name: Jeffrey James Harris
- Born: 31 August 1931
- Died: 17 February 2023 (aged 91)
- Original team: Tocumwal
- Height: 174 cm (5 ft 9 in)
- Weight: 70 kg (154 lb)

Playing career^{1}
Years	Club	Games (Goals)
1955	Hawthorn	1 (0)
- ^{1} Playing statistics correct to the end of 1955.

Jeffrey James Harris (31 August 1931 – 17 February 2023) was an Australian rules footballer who played with Hawthorn in the Victorian Football League (VFL).
