= Fred Hawking =

Australian rules footballer, born 1909

Personal information
- Full name: Frederick Hawking
- Born: 22 September 1909
- Died: 8 September 1988 (aged 78)
- Original team: Mooroopna (GVFL)
- Height: 180 cm (5 ft 11 in)
- Weight: 73 kg (161 lb)
- Positions: Wing, centre

Playing career^{1}
Years	Club	Games (Goals)
1932–38, 1941	Geelong	102 (18)
- ^{1} Playing statistics correct to the end of 1941.

Fred Hawking (22 September 1909 – 8 September 1988) was an Australian rules footballer who played with Geelong in the VFL during the 1930s.

He was the cousin of Clyde Helmer.

Hawking played his career as both a wingman and centreman. He won Geelong's best and fairest in 1935 and was a premiership player in 1937.
