= Frank Vergona =

Australian rules football umpire

Umpiring career
Years	League	Role
1973–1989	VFA	Field umpire

Frank Vergona is a former Australian rules football field umpire, most notable for his career in the Victorian Football Association in the 1970s and 1980s.

Vergona began umpiring Australian rules football in Melbourne's suburban leagues during the mid-1960s. In the early 1970s, he umpired in the Victorian Football League reserves grade, and then in 1973 switched to the Victorian Football Association. A fringe umpire during most of the 1970s, Vergona spent much of his time in the reserves until securing a regular senior position in 1980. Easily recognisable due to his short stature (5'3"), tight shorts and oiled legs and noted for his bold umpiring personality, Vergona soon become a popular cult figure in the VFA; and he is often considered alongside many of the VFA's great players as one of the personalities synonymous with the popular and marketable era enjoyed by the VFA during the 1970s. Well respected as an umpire, through his career he umpired in six grand finals: the 1980, 1982 and 1983 Division 1 grand finals, and the 1981, 1984 and 1987 Division 2 grand finals. He umpired a total of just over 250 VFA games over a seventeen-year stretch between 1973 and 1989, retiring after the VFA's umpires board came under the direction of the VFL.

Outside umpiring, Vergona earned his living as a teacher at Dandenong High School as well as some of Geelong and Melbourne's top private schools, best known as a long-serving Latin teacher at Xavier College Kew and Melbourne Grammar School.
