= Geoff Organ =

Australian rules footballer, born 1918

Personal information
- Full name: Geoffrey Joseph Organ
- Born: 1 May 1918; Mooroopna, Victoria
- Died: 16 April 1993 (aged 74)
- Original team: Mooroopna
- Height: 175 cm (5 ft 9 in)
- Weight: 71 kg (157 lb)

Playing career^{1}
Years	Club	Games (Goals)
1939	Geelong	1 (0)
- ^{1} Playing statistics correct to the end of 1939.

Geoffrey Joseph Organ (1 May 1918 – 16 April 1993) was an Australian rules footballer who played with Geelong in the Victorian Football League (VFL).

He served in the Australian Army during World War Two.
