= Jack Ginnivan =

Australian rules footballer (born 2002)

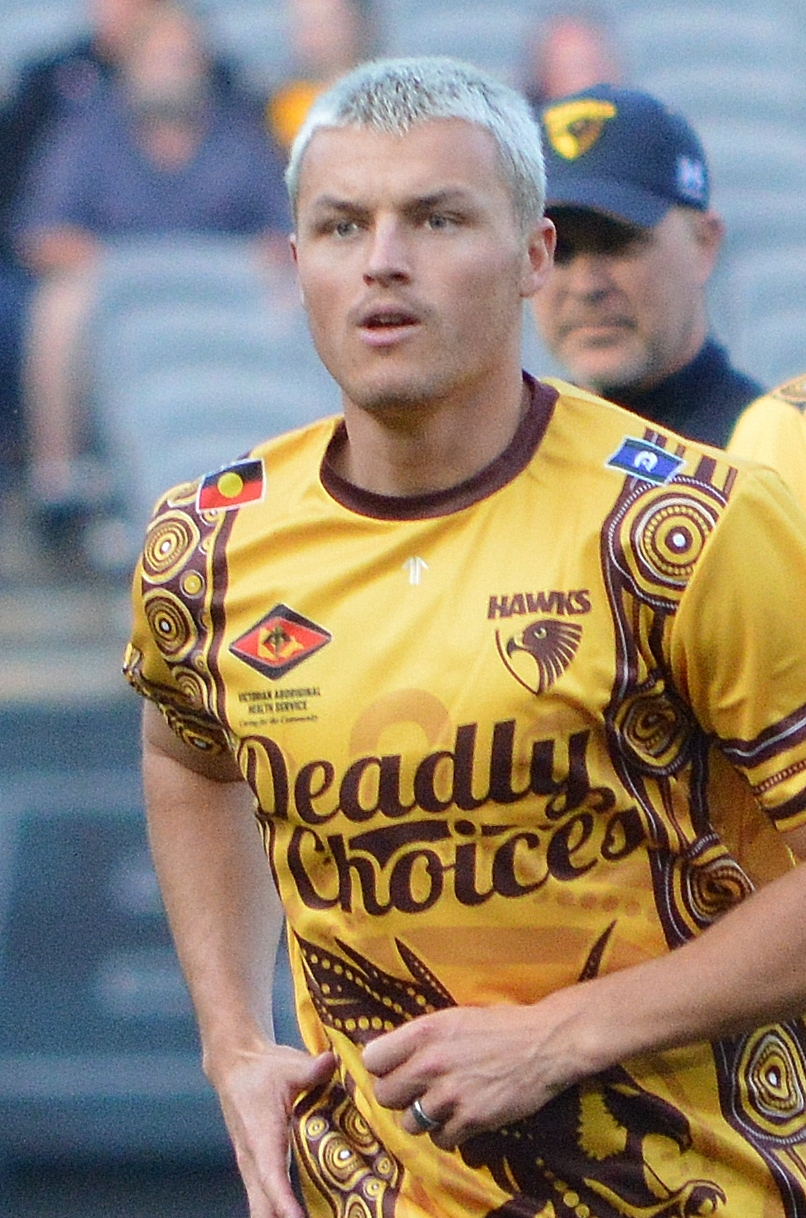
- Ginnivan in May 2026

Personal information
- Full name: Jack Ginnivan
- Nickname: Ginni
- Born: 9 December 2002 (age 23); Castlemaine, Victoria, Australia
- Original team: Bendigo Pioneers (NAB League)
- Draft: No. 13, 2021 rookie draft
- Debut: Round 19, 2021, Collingwood vs. Port Adelaide, at Marvel Stadium
- Height: 185 cm (6 ft 1 in)
- Weight: 77 kg (170 lb)
- Position: Forward

Club information
- Current club: Hawthorn
- Number: 33

Playing career^{1}
Years	Club	Games (Goals)
2021–2023	Collingwood	42 (58)
2024–	Hawthorn	72 (77)
Total		114 (135)
- ^{1} Playing statistics correct to the end of 2026.

Career highlights
- AFL premiership player: 2023; Anzac Day Medal: 2022; 2× 22under22 team: 2022, 2024; Collingwood reserves leading goalkicker: 2021

Jack Ginnivan (/ˈɡɪnɪˌvən/; born 9 December 2002) is a professional Australian rules footballer who plays for the Hawthorn Football Club in the Australian Football League (AFL). He previously played for the Collingwood Football Club, where he was a member of the club's premiership-winning team in 2023. A small forward, Ginnivan is known for his goal sense, pressure and high-profile playing style.

Ginnivan rose to prominence in the 2022 season, where he kicked 40 goals and won the Anzac Day Medal in just his tenth game. He was selected in the AFL Players Association's 22 Under 22 team and received a Rising Star nomination, establishing himself as one of the league's most recognisable young forwards. His style of play, particularly his technique of drawing high-contact free kicks, generated significant media attention and made him one of the most polarising players in the league.

Ginnivan played a role in Collingwood's premiership before being traded to Hawthorn. At Hawthorn, he has transitioned into a more versatile forward by contributing both as a goalscorer and linking player between midfield and attack. Off the field, Ginnivan has received attention for his outspoken personality, social media presence and controversies.

== Early life and state football ==
Ginnivan started playing Australian rules football at the age of six, following Hawthorn winning the 2008 AFL Grand Final. As a youth, he played for the Newstead Football Club in the Maryborough Castlemaine District Football League and at the age of 11, kicked his 100th goal for the club. Later, he played junior football for Golden Square and Strathfieldsaye in the Bendigo Football Netball League, helping them win a premiership in 2019. In 2020, Ginnivan played for the Bendigo Pioneers in the NAB League and was selected for the Vic Country team. Ginnivan studied at Bendigo Senior Secondary College and grew up supporting Hawthorn.

== AFL career ==
=== Collingwood (2021–2023) ===
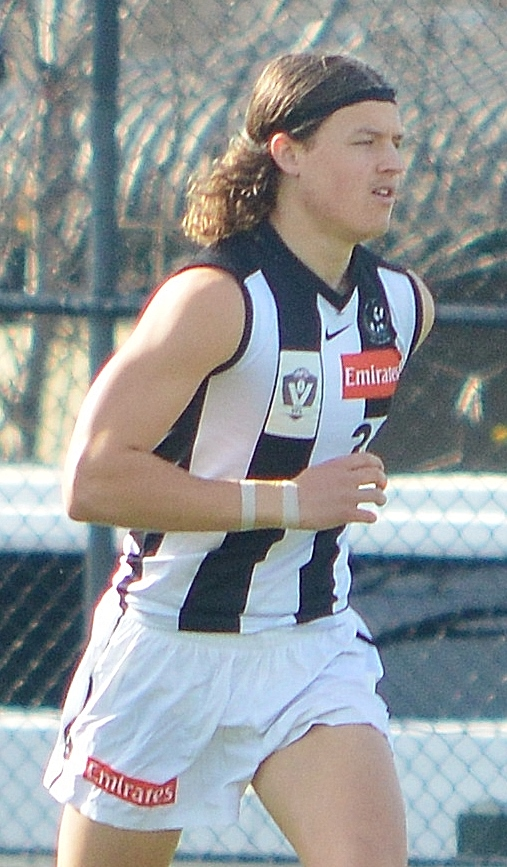
Ginnivan playing a VFL game in 2021

==== 2021: Debut season ====
Ginnivan was drafted by Collingwood with their first pick of the 2021 rookie draft, which was the 13th pick overall. After kicking 11 goals over three matches in the Victorian Football League (VFL), including several four-goal games, Ginnivan made his AFL debut against Port Adelaide in the nineteenth round of the 2021 AFL season, at Marvel Stadium. He played in the last five games of the season, kicking six goals.

==== 2022: Breakout season ====
In the 2022 Anzac Day match, in just his tenth career game, Ginnivan kicked five goals and won the Anzac Medal as best on ground, as well as the Rising Star nomination for round 6. As his second season progressed, he quickly became a high-profile and controversial player, after gaining a reputation among media and rival spectators for ducking or shrugging into high tackles to win free kicks, and later admitting to doing so deliberately and even practising the technique in an unusually frank interview.

Ginnivan was booed by rival fans for much of the end of his second season – including an infamous incident when Sydney fans booed him after he had left the game with injury, drawing considerable scorn towards those fans in the media.

==== 2023: Premiership and move to Hawthorn ====
In the summer of 2023, Ginnivan was on a training tour with Collingwood in Torquay, where he was caught taking illicit substances in the hotel bathroom. He was given a two-game ban and missed games against Geelong and Port Adelaide.

Ginnivan played only 14 of the club's 26 games, making his first appearance of the season in round 5 against St Kilda, kicking one goal from 13 disposals. He continued to appear in and out of the side throughout the season, and kicked a total of 12 goals, with a season high of three goals against Essendon in round 24.

Ginnivan played as the substitute for Collingwood's two finals games before earning his spot in the starting 22 for the grand final. Ginnivan became a premiership player in Collingwood's win over Brisbane Lions by four points, amassing seven disposals and one behind on the day.

Following the grand final, Ginnivan requested a trade to Hawthorn, and was traded on 18 October.

=== Hawthorn (2024–) ===
==== 2024: First season as a Hawk ====
Ginnivan has played a role for Hawthorn that connects the midfield to the attack. Although he has scored fewer goals than in 2022, his statistics show an increase in possessions, score involvements, and entries into the forward 50.

In Round 19 coming up against his old side, Ginnivan collected 31 disposals for 417 metres gained and kicked 2 goals in a best on ground performance, cementing himself as a key player in Hawthorn's revival.

== Personal life ==
Ginnivan's father, Craig Ginnivan, kicked 17 goals for Campbells Creek in the Maryborough Castlemaine District Football League in a 1990 match. Campbells Creek's final score of 100.34 (634) is the highest ever in a senior Australian rules football match.

== Statistics ==
Updated to the end of 2026.

Legend
G	Goals	K	Kicks	D	Disposals	T	Tackles
B	Behinds	H	Handballs	M	Marks
#	Played in that season's premiership team

Season	Team	No.	Games	Totals							Averages (per game)							Votes
Season	Team	No.	Games	G	B	K	H	D	M	T	G	B	K	H	D	M	T	Votes
2021	Collingwood	33	5	6	3	38	7	45	18	4	1.2	0.6	7.6	1.4	9.0	3.6	0.8	0
2022	Collingwood	33	23	40	19	161	62	223	62	34	1.7	0.8	7.0	2.7	9.7	2.7	1.5	3
2023^{#}	Collingwood	33	14	12	8	87	40	127	32	16	0.9	0.6	6.2	2.9	9.1	2.3	1.1	1
2024	Hawthorn	33	23	28	25	235	145	380	89	63	1.2	1.1	10.2	6.3	16.5	3.9	2.7	3
2025	Hawthorn	33	25	29	10	261	205	466	89	52	1.2	0.4	10.4	8.2	18.6	3.6	2.1	0
2026	Hawthorn	33	24	20	18	283	167	450	127	56	0.8	0.8	11.8	7.0	18.8	5.3	2.3	7
Career			114	135	83	1065	626	1691	417	225	1.2	0.7	9.3	5.5	14.8	3.7	2.0	14

== Honours and achievements ==
Team

- AFL premiership player (Collingwood): 2023
- Minor premiership (Collingwood): 2023
- McClelland Trophy (Hawthorn): 2024

Individual

- Anzac Day Medal: 2022
- 2× 22under22 team: 2022, 2024
- Collingwood reserves leading goalkicker: 2021
- AFL Rising Star nominee: 2022
