= Clem Carr =

Australian rules footballer (1901–1984)

Personal information
- Full name: Clement John Carr
- Born: 5 June 1901; Tumby Bay, South Australia
- Died: 2 July 1984 (aged 83); Tocumwal, New South Wales
- Original team: Tocumwal
- Height: 180 cm (5 ft 11 in)
- Weight: 79 kg (174 lb)

Playing career^{1}
Years	Club	Games (Goals)
1928–29	Melbourne	4 (0)
- ^{1} Playing statistics correct to the end of 1929.

Clement John Carr (5 June 1901 – 2 July 1984) was an Australian rules footballer who played with Melbourne in the Victorian Football League (VFL).
