= Julie Andrews (academic) =

Aboriginal Australian academic

Julie Andrews OAM
- Born: Mooroopna, Victoria, Australia
- Education: La Trobe University (PhD, 2015)
- Occupations: academic and historian
- Known for: Indigenous research

Julie Andrews is an Aboriginal Australian academic and historian.

Andrews is a professor at La Trobe University in Victoria where she is also the Academic Director of Indigenous Research.

She has contributed to numerous research articles, journal articles and books and has written her own pieces of original creative work.

Andrews is also the university's most cited Aboriginal Studies researcher.

== Academic career ==
Andrews has been involved with La Trobe University since the 1990's.

From 1992 until 1996, she was the convenor of the student representative council at The Koori Centre and served as an Aboriginal liaison officer from 1996 until 2001. Andrews has also been a convenor and lecturer of Aboriginal Studies since 1992 and the chief investigator of Bringing Up Our Yorta Yorta Children since 1998. Andrews was also a Indigenous policy development officer at the university from 2002 to 2005.

From 2002 until 2005, Andrews was the chairperson of the Hyllus Maris Memorial Lecture.

In 2012, Andrews developed the university's first subject consisting entirely of First Nations content, delivered by First Nations lecturers.

In 2015, Andrews completed her PhD with a thesis entitled Where's all the community? Kinship, mobility and identity revisited in Aboriginal Melbourne.

Andrews is credited with developing the university's Indigenous academic framework which led to a First Nations curriculum being developed. She also founded the university's first Indigenous Research Centre called Gabra Bilk, Wurruwila Wutja which was established as part of La Trobe's 2022-2030 Indigenous Research Strategy.

== Community involvement ==
Andrews has served in various community leadership roles including being a member of the Aboriginal Cultural Advisory Council at the Museum of Victoria since 2011.

She has also held positions with Victorian Rugby, the Rotary Club of Balwyn, Opening the Doors Foundation and the Victorian Aboriginal Community Health Organisation.

Andrews is also an occasional contributor to The Conversation. She has also offered her commentary on various Indigenous issues in the media.

In March 2024, Andrew spoke at the Yoorook Justice Commission hearing.

== Personal life ==
Andrews was born in Mooroopna, Victoria and is a descendant from the Yorta Yorta, Wiradjuri and Wurundjeri Woiwurrung peoples and is a member of the Briggs family and the Dhulunyagan clan.

She attended St Brendan's Primary School before attending Townsville's Black Community School which had been established by Eddie and Bonita Mabo.

== Honours ==
For her services to tertiary education, Andrews was awarded the Medal of the Order of Australia in the 2023 King's Birthday Honours, which she dedicated to her late mother Leah Andrews nee Briggs.

In 2024, she was inducted into the Victorian Honour Roll of Women.
