= Paul Brown (Australian footballer) =

Australian rules footballer

Personal information
- Born: 6 May 1969 (age 57)
- Original team: Echuca
- Debut: Round 17, 1990, Geelong vs. North Melbourne, at Kardinia Park
- Height: 187 cm (6 ft 2 in)
- Weight: 87 kg (192 lb)

Playing career^{1}
Years	Club	Games (Goals)
1990–1998	Geelong	84 (66)
- ^{1} Playing statistics correct to the end of 1998.

Paul Brown (born 6 May 1969) is a former Australian rules footballer who played with Geelong in the AFL during the 1990s.

Geelong recruited Paul Brown from Echuca and he started his career with them in 1990, going on to become a versatile player who was used at both ends of the ground. He spent the 1992 season primarily up forward and kicked 37 goals for the year. From then on he played mostly in defence although he ventured forward on occasions, including in Geelong's round five game against Fitzroy in 1995 when he kicked seven goals. After appearing in both the 1994 and 1995 Grand Finals, both losses, he ruptured a patella tendon which forced him into retirement.

On 30 October 2015, Brown was injured in an assault in the Victorian town of Shepparton. He was hospitalised, suffering from a fractured skull and bleeding on the brain. An 18 year old man was charged with his assault.

Brown is the father of the Richmond footballer Tom Brown and the Western Bulldogs footballer Millie Brown.
