= Mooroopna Football Club =

Australian rules football and netball club

Mooroopna

Names
- Full name: Mooroopna Football Netball Club
- Nickname: Cats
- Motto: "We are Mooroopna!"
- Club song: 'Cheers Boys Cheer'

Club details
- Founded: 1877; 149 years ago
- Colours
- Competition: GVFL
- President: Bill Dowling
- Coach: John Lamont
- Premierships: 12
- Ground: Mooroopna Recreation Reserve

Uniforms
Home

Other information
- Official website: http://www.mooroopnafnc.com.au

The Mooroopna Football Netball Club, nicknamed the Cats, is an Australian rules football and netball club based in the rural town of Mooroopna, Victoria.

Mooroopna currently competes in the Goulburn Valley Football League (GVFL), of which Mooroopna is a founding member.

== History ==
The first apparent details of a game of Australian Rules football between Mooroopna and Shepparton was published in The Weekly Times in July 1879

After short periods prior to and following World War II playing in the Goulburn Valley Football Association (GVFA) and Central Goulburn Valley Football League (CGVFL), Mooroopna returned to the GVFL in 1949, where it has played to the present day.

== Competition Timeline ==
- 1893 - 1934: Goulburn Valley Football League
- 1935 - Goulburn Valley Second Eighteens Football League
- 1936 - 1938: Goulburn Valley Football League
- 1939 - 1941: Goulburn Valley Football Association
- 1942 - 1944: Club in recess > World War Two
- 1945 - Goulburn Valley Football Association
- 1946 - 1948: Central Goulburn Valley Football League
- 1949 - 2019: Goulburn Valley Football League
- 2020 - GVFNL & Mooroopna FNC in recess > COVID-19
- 2021 to present day - Goulburn Valley Football League

== Football Premierships ==
Seniors

League	Total Flags	Premiership year(s)
Goulburn Valley FL	12	1893, 1894, 1895, 1896, 1907, 1923, 1924, 1936, 1937, 1938, 1985, 1986.
Goulburn Valley Football Association	1	1939
Central Goulburn Valley Football League	1	1946

Reserves

League	Total Flags	Premiership year(s)
Goulburn Valley Second Eighteens Football League	2	1928, 1929
Goulburn Valley FL	6	1954, 1969, 1982, 1984, 2012, 2015

Under 18's / Thirds

League	Total Flags	Premiership year(s)
Goulburn Valley FL	2	1982, 1986

== League Best & Fairest ==
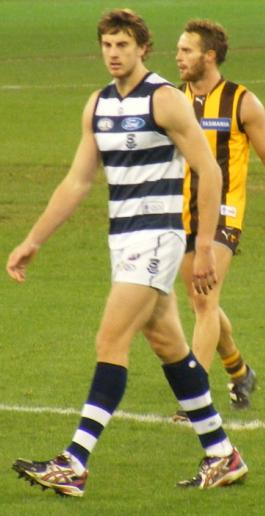
Mark Blake

Senior Football

- Goulburn Valley Football League: Morrison Medal
  - 1962 - Brian McCarty
  - 1965, 1967, 1968 - Ray Willett
  - 1972 & 1973 - Dowie Bux
  - 1977 - Gavin Saunders
  - 1983 & 1985 - Gary Cooper
  - 2012 - Mark Blake

== VFL/AFL players ==
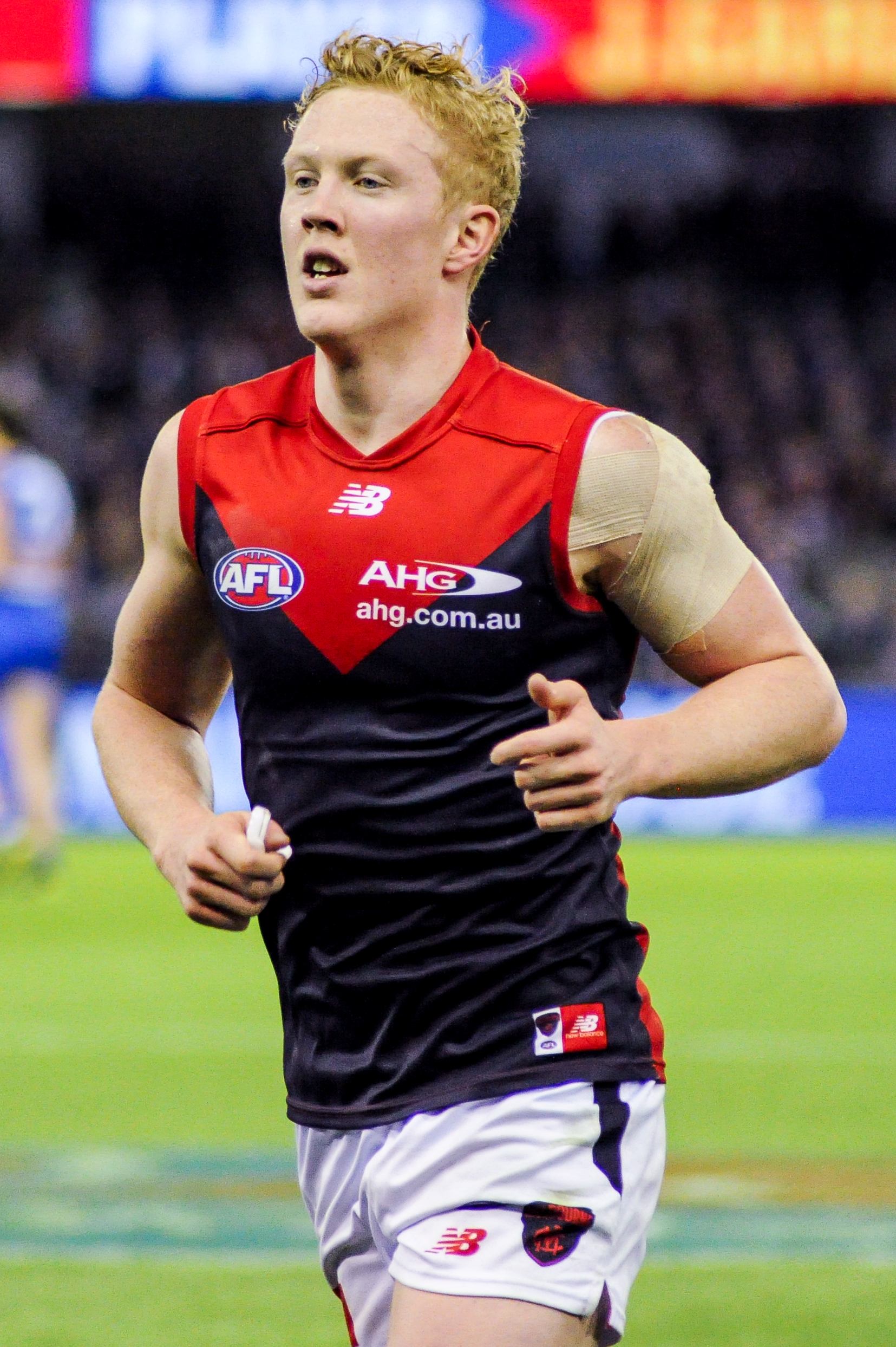
Clayton Oliver

The following footballers played with Mooroopna, prior to playing senior football in the VFL/AFL, and / or drafted, with the year indicating their VFL/AFL debut.

- 1909 - Ken McKenzie - St Kilda
- 1922 - Angus MacIsaac - Richmond
- 1923 - Clyde Hill - Carlton
- 1925 - Fred Wood - Richmond
- 1932 - Fred Hawking - Geelong
- 1934 - Jim Steigenberger - Fitzroy
- 1936 - Ashley Foley - Geelong
- 1937 - Clyde Helmer - Geelong
- 1939 - Geoff Organ - Geelong
- 1940 - Shadrach James - Fitzroy
- 1946 - Trojan Darveniza - St Kilda
- 1947 - Arthur Irvine - Geelong
- 1955 - Roger Bullen - Geelong
- 1956 - Merv Hicks - Collingwood
- 1975 - Barry Ough - Melbourne
- 2007 - Jarrod Harbrow - Footscray
- 2009 - Riley Milne - Hawthorn
- 2015 - Nathan Drummond - Richmond
- 2016 - Clayton Oliver - Melbourne
- 2017 - Jy Simpkin - North Melbourne
- 2019 - Laitham Vandermeer - Footscray
- 2022 - Tom Brown - Richmond
