= Fred Wood (footballer) =

Australian rules footballer, born 1901

Personal information
- Full name: Fred Wood
- Born: 29 March 1901
- Died: 7 February 1957 (aged 55)
- Original team: Mooroopna
- Height: 182 cm (6 ft 0 in)
- Weight: 80 kg (176 lb)

Playing career^{1}
Years	Club	Games (Goals)
1925	Richmond	3 (0)
- ^{1} Playing statistics correct to the end of 1925.

Fred Wood (29 March 1901 – 7 February 1957) was a former Australian rules footballer who played with Richmond in the Victorian Football League (VFL).
