= Campbells Creek vs Primrose (1990 MCDFL season) =

1990 MCDFL season
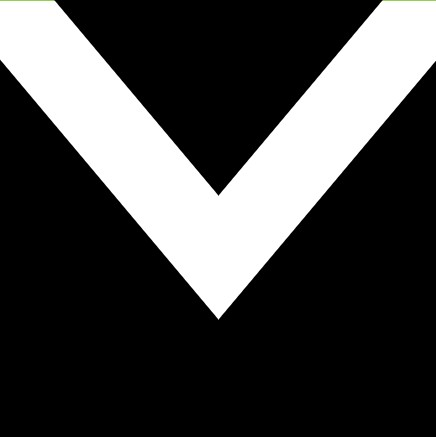

| Campbells Creek | Primrose |
|---|---|
| 100.34 (634) | 3.0 (18) |
| | 1 | 2 | 3 | 4 |
|---|---|---|---|---|
| CC | 20.4 (124) | 45.12 (282) | 74.22 (466) | 100.34 (634) |
| PMR | 0.0 (0) | 0.0 (0) | 0.0 (0) | 3.0 (18) |
- Date: 23 June 1990

On 23 June 1990, an Australian rules football match was played between Campbells Creek and Primrose. The match was in round 11 of the Maryborough Castlemaine District Football League (MCDFL) season, and saw the highest ever score in a senior Australian rules football match, with Campbells Creek winning by 616 points.

Although this is the highest senior score, a 1983 Victorian Football Association thirds match saw Williamstown defeat Geelong West 110.27 (687) to 2.0 (12) − the highest score in any grade.

== Background ==
The Primrose Football Club, based in Maryborough, had been fluctuating in the league since their last premiership in 1984. After last making the finals in 1987, the club would finish bottom of the league in 1989, with just one win and a percentage of 21%. This included one abandoned match against Newstead in which the remaining twelve Primrose players on the field (six had been sent off) walked off in the final quarter.

The 1990 season would see the club engage in crisis talks, with player numbers and experience dwindling. Despite these issues, Primrose would manage a victory against fellow strugglers Chewton, defeating them 14.6 (90) to 10.20 (80) early in the season. Chewton would fold at the season's end.

Going into the match against Campbells Creek, Primrose had lost several senior players to injuries and were forced to top up their squad with reserves and juniors players, some of whom were playing their second or even third match of the day. In the under-17's game, Campbells Creek defeated Primrose 15.12 (102) to 3.2 (20), while in the following reserves game, a similar blowout would occur with a wayward Campbells Creek kicking 35.51 (261) to no score.

== Match summary ==
=== First quarter ===
Campbells Creek would start accurately, kicking 20 goals from 24 scoring shots. Full-forward Greg Stubbs kicked two of the goals, but was forced to leave the field early in the quarter due to a hamstring injury. Stubbs did not take further part in the game. The quarter lasted for 40 minutes.

=== Second quarter ===
Scoring continued to increase for Campbells Creek, with a goal being kicked roughly once every minute of game time. The quarter lasted for 45 minutes. Despite concerns that the Primrose players would not see out the match, they elected to continue in the second half.

=== Third quarter ===
Campbells Creek would kick 29 goals from 39 scoring shots in the third quarter. During the quarter, they would eclipse the league record score of 63.21 (399) set by Talbot against Chewton in 1989 as well as the Victorian record score of 65.35 (425) set by Navarre against Moonambel in the Lexton Football League in 1982. The total of 29.10 (184) may have also possibly been the highest score kicked by one team in a single quarter, later beaten by Great Western's last quarter total of 30.6 (186) against Ararat Eagles in the Mininera & District Football League in 2019. The quarter lasted for at least 50 minutes.

=== Final quarter ===
Early into the quarter, Campbells Creek would eclipse the all-time scoring record of 78.31 (499) set by Killarney Vale against Wyong in the Central Coast Australian Football League in 1986. Sunset occurred at 5:13pm while the quarter was still in progress. Several spectators who had parked their cars around the ground turned on their headlights to illuminate the field.

With ten minutes left to play, Campbells Creek had kicked 91 goals, but according to central umpire Daryl Devereaux, "they could have kicked another 20 goals" but wound up missing easy shots for goal that would've blown the margin out further. Despite being heavily beaten, Primrose salvaged some pride by kicking three goals. After Primrose kicked their first goal, Devereaux shook the player's hand.

Ruck-rover Reg 'Butch' Sartori kicked the club's 100th goal (his eighteenth) with just twenty seconds left to play. At this point, correctly displaying 100 goals on the scoreboard at the ground became impossible as there was no room for three number sheets in the goals column.

The final quarter lasted for at least 50 minutes. The game was reported to have ended in near-darkness at 5:35pm, a full three hours and five minutes after beginning.

=== Scoreboard ===
1990 MCDFL season
Saturday, 23 June | Campbells Creek | def. | Primrose | Campbells Creek Recreation Reserve
20.4 (124); 45.12 (282); 74.22 (466); 100.34 (634) | Q1; Q2; Q3; Final | 0.0 (0); 0.0 (0); 0.0 (0); 3.0 (18) | Umpires: D. Devereaux (central umpire)
R. Sartori 18, C. Ginnivan 17, K. Stevens 14, A. McGibbon 13, C. Pietsch 13, W. Dodson 8, M. Struchbree 4, B. Ginnivan 3, G. Stubbs 2, W. Stubbing 2, M. Ewing, D. Suckling, S. Potts, T. Plumridge, G. Winkleman | Goals | Not reported
R. Sartori, C. Ginnivan, K. Stevens, A. McGibbon, C. Pietsch | Best | Not reported

== Aftermath ==
After the match, 130 supporters and players from the club got together to celebrate the result, which reportedly only wound down at 4pm on the following Sunday. League officials telephoned the club to get the result of the game, which was provided by the club secretary. Shortly after, the league official called the secretary back and asked "is that true?" in disbelief. Daryl Devereaux, the central umpire who bounced the ball to restart play 107 times (103 for the goals, and once to start each quarter), later remarked "I've never had a game like that before and it really was unbelievable."

Only four Campbells Creek players did not kick a goal: Dean Costello, Warren Murley, Barry Waters, and Shane Green. Murley, who played at full-back, spent most of the game chatting with the Primrose full-forward and the goal umpire.

Despite the ignominious result, Primrose became more competitive for the remainder of the season as their plight saw a group of players from Bendigo join the club to fill in. However, they would not win another game and finished last. In the following season, they turned in a more competitive performance in the opening round against Campbells Creek, losing by just 17 points. They would finish last again over the next two seasons, winning two games in 1991 and one in 1992. The latter, an 11.5 (71) to 8.7 (55) win over Harcourt, would turn out to be their final victory.

In 1993, the Victorian Country Football League proposed that the club merge with co-tenants Maryborough Rovers, a move which never materialised. Primrose would go winless with a percentage of just 6%. Coincidentally, their final game would be a heavy blowout defeat against Campbells Creek, who kicked 76.43 (499) to set the then-second highest score in Victorian history. Primrose would also kick 3.0 (18) in this match. The club officially went into recess on January 27, 1994, with just four people showing up to the final meeting to discuss the club's fate.

== See also ==
- Williamstown vs Geelong West (1983 VFA season)
