= Barry Ough =

Australian rules footballer

Personal information
- Full name: Barry Duncan Ough
- Born: 30 June 1957
- Died: 29 April 2014 (aged 56)
- Original team: Mooroopna
- Height: 193 cm (6 ft 4 in)
- Weight: 86 kg (190 lb)

Playing career^{1}
Years	Club	Games (Goals)
1975	Melbourne	1 (0)
- ^{1} Playing statistics correct to the end of 1975.

Barry Duncan Ough (30 June 1957 – 29 April 2014) was an Australian rules footballer who played with Melbourne in the Victorian Football League (VFL).

Ough's only appearance for Melbourne came in their 25-point win over Essendon at the MCG during the 1975 VFL season.

He joined Werribee the following year, without getting a clearance from Melbourne. In 1978 he won Werribee's best and fairest award, playing as a centre half-back.

Back at his original club Mooroopna in 1979, he was awarded that season's Morrison Medal, as the player deemed to be the best and fairest in the Goulburn Valley Football League.
