= Ashley Foley =

Australian rules footballer, born 1915

Personal information
- Full name: Ashley Foley
- Born: 27 December 1915
- Died: 20 February 2005 (aged 89)
- Original team: Mooroopna
- Height: 179 cm (5 ft 10 in)
- Weight: 80 kg (176 lb)
- Position: Centre

Playing career^{1}
| Years | Club | Games (Goals) |
| 1936–1938 | Geelong | 15 (2) |
| 1939 | Essendon | 7 (1) |
| Total | | 22 (3) |
- ^{1} Playing statistics correct to the end of 1939.

Ashley Foley (27 December 1915 – 20 February 2005) was an Australian rules footballer who played for the Geelong Football Club and Essendon Football Club in the Victorian Football League (VFL).
