= Graham Osborne (footballer, born 1963) =

Australian rules footballer (born 1963)

Personal information
- Born: 10 February 1963 (age 63)
- Original team: Preston
- Height: 179 cm (5 ft 10 in)
- Weight: 80 kg (176 lb)

Playing career^{1}
Years	Club	Games (Goals)
1984–1989	Fitzroy	37 (8)
- ^{1} Playing statistics correct to the end of 1989.

Graham Osborne (born 10 February 1963) is a former Australian rules footballer who played with Fitzroy in the Victorian Football League (VFL).

Osborne started his career at Preston in the Victorian Football Association (VFA) and was a member of the Preston team that defeated Geelong West in the 1983 VFA Grand Final.

He had to wait until the 1984 VFL finals series to make his Fitzroy debut, which came against Collingwood in an elimination final. This made him the first Fitzroy player, since Charlie Chapman in 1924, to make their league debut in a final. Fitzroy lost the match by 46 points.

From 1984 to 1989, Osborne made 37 appearances for Fitzroy. He finished his career with a reserves premiership in 1989.

His younger brother, Richard Osborne, played 187 games with Fitzroy and kicked 411 goals.
