= Fred De Abel =

Australian rules footballer, born 1910

Personal information
- Full name: Frederick Arthur De Abel
- Born: 4 May 1910; Mooroopna, Victoria
- Died: 3 August 1976 (aged 66); Ferntree Gully Upper, Victoria
- Original team: Myrtleford

Playing career^{1}
Years	Club	Games (Goals)
1934	Hawthorn	1 (0)
- ^{1} Playing statistics correct to the end of 1934.

Frederick Arthur De Abel (4 May 1910 – 3 August 1976) was an Australian rules footballer who played with Hawthorn in the Victorian Football League (VFL).

De Abel later served in the Australian Army during world War II, seeing active service in Papua New Guinea.
