= Trojan Darveniza =

Australian rules footballer

Personal information
- Full name: Trojan Darveniza
- Born: 30 November 1921
- Died: 23 May 2015 (aged 93)
- Original team: Shepparton
- Height: 187 cm (6 ft 2 in)
- Weight: 96 kg (212 lb)

Playing career^{1}
Years	Club	Games (Goals)
1946	St Kilda	6 (1)
- ^{1} Playing statistics correct to the end of 1946.

Trojan Darveniza (30 November 1921 – 23 May 2015) was an Australian rules footballer.

== Playing career ==
Darveniza played six games for St Kilda in the Victorian Football League, all during the 1946 season.

Darveniza won Mooroopna's 1945 best and fairest award.
