= Millie Brown (footballer) =

Australian rules footballer (born 2001)

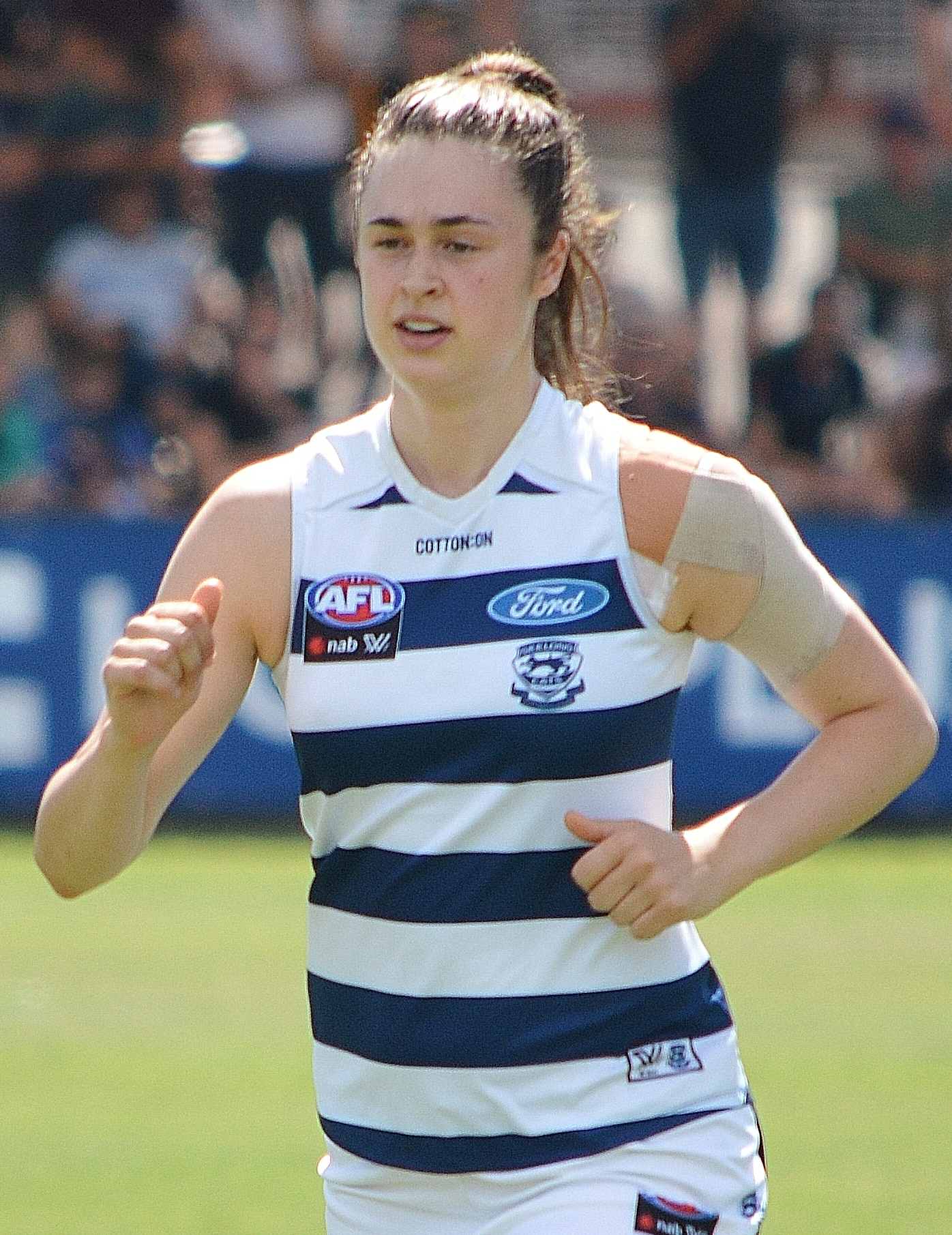
- Brown with Geelong in February 2020

Personal information
- Born: 15 January 2001 (age 25)
- Original team: Murray Bushrangers (NAB League Girls)
- Draft: No. 11, 2019 national draft (F/D)
- Debut: Round 1, 2020, Geelong vs. Fremantle, at Fremantle Oval
- Height: 175 cm (5 ft 9 in)
- Position: Key defender

Club information
- Current club: Western Bulldogs
- Number: 20

Playing career^{1}
| Years | Club | Games (Goals) |
| 2020–2022 | Geelong | 9 (0) |
| 2022– | Western Bulldogs | 5 (0) |
| Total | | 14 (0) |
- ^{1} Playing statistics correct to the end of the 2023 season.

Career highlights
- Junior: Under-18 All-Australian: 2019

Millie Brown (born 15 January 2001) is an Australian rules footballer playing for the Western Bulldogs in the AFL Women's (AFLW) competition. She has previously played for Geelong.

== AFLW career ==
Brown was drafted by Geelong with the club's first pick and the 11th overall in the 2019 AFL Women's draft. She is the daughter of 84-game Geelong AFL player Paul Brown and was selected under the father–daughter rule. Brown made her debut against Fremantle at Fremantle Oval in the opening round of the 2020 season. On 27 July 2021, Geelong announced that Brown will be inactive for the upcoming 2021-22 AFLW Season. In June 2022, Brown was traded to Western Bulldogs.

== Personal life ==
Brown is currently studying a Bachelor of Psychology (Honours) at Deakin University.
