= Williamstown vs Geelong West (1983 VFA season) =

1983 VFA thirds season

Williamstown	Geelong West
110.27 (687)	2.0 (12)
	1	2	3	4
WIL	15.9 (99)	44.17 (281)	76.20 (476)	110.27 (687)
GW	1.0 (6)	1.0 (6)	2.0 (12)	2.0 (12)
- Date: 23 July 1983
- Stadium: Williamstown Cricket Ground

On 23 July 1983, an Australian rules football match was played between Williamstown and Geelong West at the Williamstown Cricket Ground. The match was in round 14 of the VFA thirds season, the under-18s competition of the Victorian Football Association (VFA).

The match saw the highest ever score in Australian rules football, in any league and at any grade, with Williamstown winning by 675 points.

== Background ==
In 1983, the VFA reduced the age eligibility of the thirds competition, changing it from an under-19 competition to an under-18 competition. Away games were also a particular problem for many clubs, as the younger-aged players generally preferred to play in local junior competitions than travel the often long distances to play an Association away game, particularly as none were old enough to hold driver's licences.

No club was worse affected by the changes to the competition than Geelong West, whose travelling distances for away games exceeded those of any other club. It seldom attracted more than fifteen players to training, and forfeited two games early in the 1983 season simply through lack of players.

== Match summary ==
Only twelve Geelong West players took the field – one fewer and it would have been forced to forfeit. Under the thirds rules at the time, there were sixteen players per team on the ground at a time. Williamstown had seventeen players on the day, including one on the bench.

Williamstown's Stephen Cooke dominated the match, with 46 goals out of 54 scoring shots, along with a total of 30 marks. Cooke was later quoted as saying that the Geelong West side – who had already had four players suffer injuries in the first half – "had to be coaxed out at half time".

All 17 Williamstown players scored at least one goal. Only one of them, Philip Brook, went on to play for the club's senior side. Dave Hughes was the Williamstown coach.

=== Scoreboard ===
1983 VFA season
Saturday, 23 July (2:05 pm)	Williamstown	def.	Geelong West	Williamstown Cricket Ground
15.9 (99); 44.17 (281); 76.20 (476); 110.27 (687)	Q1; Q2; Q3; Final	1.0 (6); 1.0 (6); 2.0 (12); 2.0 (12)
S. Cooke 46, P. Brook 12, G. Bunting 10, S. Lucas 10, P. Stewart 5, R. Arandez 5, D. Doria 4, M. Hobbs 4, S. Neenan 3, J. Selvidge 2, D. Temby 2, R. McLaughlin 2, R. Andres, G. Chamberlain, D. Harrison, D. Hickey, A. Teagle.	Goals

== Aftermath ==
Williamstown forward Stephen Cooke, who kicked 46 goals during the match

Williamstown's score of 687 remains the highest in Australian rules football, in any league and at any grade. Geelong West had fared little better the previous week, conceding a short-lived record 88.23 (551) against Coburg. Following these two losses, Geelong West withdrew its thirds team for the rest of the season. Its season record at the time of withdrawal was 0–14 with a percentage of 11.7%.

The VFA's two-division format for the thirds competition was abandoned in 1984, in response to this game and a general trend of increasingly heavy losses being suffered by teams with structurally weak thirds teams. Under the new format, which ran in 1984 and 1985, the thirds played as one large division, with a gradually released fixture which divided teams into performance-based groups to ensure the weakest teams didn't have to play against the strongest teams outside the early part of the year.

Geelong West thirds won several games in 1984; but by 1985 it had returned to its previous level of futility, with an 0–19 record and percentage of 13.6% despite most of its games being played against other bottom six teams. The two-division format in the thirds returned in 1986, Geelong West finishing last in Division 1 with 0–18 and a percentage of only 6.1% that year. In 1987, Frankston kicked 92.30 (582) against Geelong West in round 1 of the thirds season, and the Roosters finished what would be its final VFA season with a percentage of 9.7%.

== See also ==
- Campbells Creek vs Primrose (1990 MCDFL season), the highest ever seniors score
- List of VFA/VFL records
