= Fraser Murphy =

Australian rules footballer

Personal information
- Born: 2 January 1963 (age 63)
- Original team: Geelong West (VFA)
- Height: 169 cm (5 ft 7 in)
- Weight: 76 kg (168 lb)

Playing career^{1}
Years	Club	Games (Goals)
1984–1991	Carlton	107 (158)
- ^{1} Playing statistics correct to the end of 1991.

Fraser Murphy (born 2 January 1963) is a former Australian rules footballer who played for Carlton in the VFL.

Murphy was a rover who played 107 games for Carlton. He was recruited in 1984, after finishing as runner-up for the J. J. Liston Trophy while playing for Geelong West in the VFA in 1983. He kicked 39 goals for Carlton in 1985, and played in Carlton's 1987 premiership team. After leaving the club in 1991 he moved to Collingwood, but did not end up playing a game for them, and then returned to the VFA with Werribee in 1992.

In 2020 he was named in the St Joseph’s College Team of Champions, recognising the best VFL/AFL players to have attended the school.
