= Jim Christou =

Australian rules footballer

Personal information
- Full name: Jim E. Christou
- Born: 24 December 1952 (age 73); Florina, Greece
- Original team: Heidelberg
- Height: 173 cm (5 ft 8 in)
- Weight: 73 kg (161 lb)

Playing career^{1}
Years	Club	Games (Goals)
1972–1976	Fitzroy	30 (23)
- ^{1} Playing statistics correct to the end of 1976.

Jim Christou (born 24 December 1952) is a former Australian rules footballer who played with Fitzroy in the Victorian Football League (VFL).

Christou was born in Florina, Greece, and migrated to Australia shortly after his birth. While playing for Heidelberg, won the Diamond Valley Football League's best and fairest award in 1971.

A rover, he started his Fitzroy career in the 1972 VFL season and in 1975 was joined in the team by his younger brother John. His nine games in 1975 were the most that he would play in a single season. He played thirty senior games for Fitzroy over 4½ years.

During the 1976 season, Christou believed he wasn't being afforded a fair opportunity for regular selection at Fitzroy, and he sought a clearance to North Melbourne. When Fitzroy rejected his clearance, he transferred at midseason without a clearance to Port Melbourne in the Victorian Football Association (the VFA and VFL did not have a reciprocal permit agreement in place). He became a regular player on the half-forward line for Port Melbourne over the next 2½ seasons, and was a member of their premiership teams in 1976 and 1977. He transferred to Yarrawonga in the Ovens & Murray Football League in 1979, but disliked travelling to the country each weekend and returned to Port Melbourne in 1980. He played in another two premierships with Port Melbourne in 1980 and 1981, and played a total of 90 games for the club.

Christou switched clubs in 1982, joining Northcote, and he captained the club to its 1982 second division grand final win over Caulfield.

Christou's brother John Christou was also a footballer, the pair playing together for much of their careers at Fitzroy, Port Melbourne and Northcote. Christou also played district cricket for Northcote as an all-rounder, playing 104 first XI games across a twelve-year career. He was a member of Northcote's 1973/74 First XI premiership.
