= Ron Watt =

Australian rules footballer

Personal information
- Full name: Ron Watt
- Born: 10 June 1963 (age 63)
- Original team: Geelong West
- Height: 180 cm (5 ft 11 in)
- Weight: 86 kg (190 lb)

Playing career^{1}
Years	Club	Games (Goals)
1984	Geelong	2 (0)
- ^{1} Playing statistics correct to the end of 1984.

Ron Watt (born 10 June 1963) is a former Australian rules footballer who played for Geelong in the Victorian Football League (VFL).

Watt played twice with Geelong in the 1984 VFL season. On debut, he had just one kick in a win over Richmond at the MCG but the following week gathered 11 disposals when Geelong went down to Footscray at Western Oval.

During the 1990s, Watt was a successful coach with North Shore and steered them to multiple Geelong Football League premierships. He returned to Geelong in 1999 as a coach and was put in charge of their VFL (formerly VFA) side, whom he guided to the 2002 flag.

In September 2012 Watt, the Geelong Football Club's player development manager, announced his intention to stand for the historical first ever directly elected Mayor of Geelong. By the close of nominations on 25 September 2012, Watt was one of nine declared candidates for the mayoral role, which will be decided upon a postal vote, which closes on 26 October 2012.
