= 2001 VFL season =

120th season of the Victorian Football League

- Date: 7 April – 23 September 2001
- Teams: 16
- Premiers: Box Hill; 1st premiership
- Runners-up: Werribee; 3rd runners-up result
- Minor premiers: Werribee; 3rd minor premiership

The 2001 VFL season was the 120th season of the Victorian Football League (VFL), a second-tier Australian rules football competition played in the states of Victoria and Tasmania. The season featured 16 clubs and ran from 7 April to 23 September, comprising a 20-match home-and-away season followed by a four-week finals series featuring the top eight clubs.

Box Hill won the top division premiership for the first time, defeating Werribee by 37 points in the 2001 VFL Grand Final. It was Box Hill's third overall senior VFA/VFL premiership, following second division premierships in 1984 and 1986.

== League membership and affiliations ==
In a continuation of the VFL's amalgamation with the AFL reserves, which had begun in 2000, there were several changes to the VFL-AFL reserves affiliations in 2001.

- Richmond affiliated with Coburg-Fitzroy. Under the affiliation, the team's nickname was changed from Lions to Tigers to match Richmond's nickname, and the partnership with Fitzroy came to an end, resulting in the team becoming known as the Coburg Tigers. The financial stability brought by the affiliation saved Coburg from extinction, as the club had been in administration since July 2000 and would have been wound up if it had not entered an AFL affiliation.
- Western Bulldogs, which had been jointly affiliated with Williamstown and Werribee, became fully affiliated with Werribee.
- Collingwood affiliated with Williamstown
- St Kilda affiliated with Springvale

In addition to these changes, a new team from Tasmania was admitted to the VFL; the admission was initially on a one-year trial basis, and a permanent licence was ultimately granted. Created and administered by Football Tasmania (later AFL Tasmania), the Tasmanian VFL club was designed to provide an opportunity for state level football in Tasmania to fill the void left by the collapse of the Tasmanian Statewide Football League at the end of the 2000 season. The club came to be known as the Tasmanian Devils, and played its home games throughout Tasmania, with five games at York Park in Launceston, four games at North Hobart Oval in Hobart, and one game at Devonport Oval in Devonport in its first season.

Consequently, there were sixteen teams in the VFL in 2001: eight clubs with VFL-AFL affiliations, three AFL reserves teams, and five stand-alone VFL clubs.

== Clubs ==
=== Venues and affiliations ===
Club	Home venue(s)	Capacity	AFL affiliation
Bendigo	Queen Elizabeth Oval	10,000	—
Box Hill	Box Hill City Oval	10,000	Hawthorn
Box Hill	Melbourne Cricket Ground	97,000	Hawthorn
Carlton	Optus Oval	35,000	Carlton
Carlton	Melbourne Cricket Ground	97,000	Carlton
Coburg	Coburg City Oval	15,000	Richmond
Essendon	Windy Hill	10,000	Essendon
Essendon	Melbourne Cricket Ground	97,000	Essendon
Frankston	Frankston Park	5,000	—
Geelong	Shell Stadium	28,000	Geelong
Geelong	Melbourne Cricket Ground	97,000	Geelong
Murray Kangaroos	Coburg City Oval	12,000	Kangaroos
Murray Kangaroos	Lavington Sports Ground	20,000	Kangaroos
Murray Kangaroos	Melbourne Cricket Ground	97,000	Kangaroos
North Ballarat	Northern Oval	11,000	—
Northern Bullants	Genis Steel Oval	5,000	—
Port Melbourne	TEAC Oval	6,000	Sydney
Sandringham	Trevor Barker Beach Oval	6,000	Melbourne
Springvale	Moorabbin Oval	8,000	St Kilda
Springvale	Shepley Oval	4,000	St Kilda
Tasmania	Bellerive Oval	16,000	—
Tasmania	Devonport Oval	10,000	—
Tasmania	York Park	15,000	—
Werribee	Chirnside Park	8,000	Western Bulldogs
Williamstown	Williamstown Cricket Ground	6,000	Collingwood

== Ladder ==
Pos	Team	Pld	W	L	D	PF	PA	PP	Pts	Qualification
1	Werribee	20	18	2	0	2357	1360	173.3	72	Finals series
2	Box Hill (P)	20	15	5	0	2240	1521	147.3	60	Finals series
3	Springvale	20	13	7	0	1921	1735	110.7	52	Finals series
4	Murray Kangaroos	20	13	7	0	1997	1854	107.7	52	Finals series
5	Carlton	20	12	8	0	1844	1577	116.9	48	Finals series
6	Frankston	20	12	8	0	1794	1730	103.7	48	Finals series
7	Coburg	20	11	9	0	1857	1791	103.7	44	Finals series
8	Essendon	20	11	9	0	1797	1893	94.9	44	Finals series
9	Williamstown	20	10	10	0	1908	1882	101.4	40	
10	Port Melbourne	20	10	10	0	1866	1883	99.1	40	
11	Sandringham	20	9	11	0	1770	1679	105.4	36	
12	North Ballarat	20	8	12	0	1615	1920	84.1	32	
13	Geelong	20	7	13	0	1617	1718	94.1	28	
14	Northern Bullants	20	6	14	0	1805	1816	99.4	24	
15	Tasmania	20	5	15	0	1458	2180	66.9	20	
16	Bendigo	20	0	20	0	1320	2627	50.2	0	

Source: AustralianFootball.com
Rules for classification: 1) points; 2) percentage; 3) number of points for.
(P) Premiers

== Finals series ==
Qualifying and elimination finals
1 September, Chirnside Park
1	Werribee	17.21 (123)
4	Murray Kangaroos	8.12 (60)
2 September, North Port Oval
5	Carlton Reserves	12.16 (88)
8	Essendon Reserves	11.10 (76)
2 September, Trevor Barker Oval
6	Frankston	12.12 (84)
7	Coburg	10.12 (72)
1 September, North Port Oval
2	Box Hill	10.11 (71)
3	Springvale	8.9 (57)

Semi-finals
8 September, North Port Oval
Springvale	16.12 108
Frankston	9.16 (70)
9 September, North Port Oval
Murray Kangaroos	16.12 (108)
Carlton Reserves	13.11 (89)

Preliminary finals
16 September, North Port Oval
Werribee	18.15 (123)
Springvale	14.17 (101)
15 September, North Port Oval
Box Hill	14.12 (96)
Murray Kangaroos	12.12 (84)

Grand final
23 September, Optus Oval
Werribee	7.12 (54)
Box Hill	13.13 (91)

=== Grand Final ===
2001 VFL Grand Final
Sunday 23 September (2:10 pm)	Werribee	def. by	Box Hill	Optus Oval (crowd: 11,500)
3.3 (21); 4.5 (29); 6.6 (42); 7.12 (54)	Q1; Q2; Q3; Final	6.4 (40); 10.7 (67); 11.10 (76); 13.13 (91)	Umpires: Davis, Grund, Quigley; Norm Goss Memorial Medal: John Baird (Box Hill)
Mitchell 3, Bowden, Churchill, Contessa, McMahon	Goals	O'Farrell 3, Passador 3, Pugsley 2, Rock 2, Lord, Picioane, Ries
S. Smith, for wrestling with C. Bateman in the second quarter	Reports	C. Bateman, for wrestling with S. Smith in the second quarter

== Awards ==
- The Jim 'Frosty' Miller Medal was won for the third consecutive year by Nick Sautner (Frankston), who kicked 73 goals.
- The J. J. Liston Trophy was jointly won by Brett Backwell (Carlton reserves) and Ezra Poyas (Coburg), who each polled 19 votes. Backwell and Poyas finished ahead of Simon Feast (Port Melbourne), who was third with 15 votes.
- The Fothergill–Round Medal was won by Kristian DePasquale (Coburg).
- Werribee won the reserves premiership. Werribee 17.12 (114) defeated Williamstown 12.15 (87) in the Grand Final, held as a curtain-raiser to the Seniors Grand Final on 23 September.

== Notable events ==
- In Round 12, Geelong 5.11 (41) trailed Port Melbourne 13.14 (92) by 51 points at three-quarter time, before kicking ten goals to one to win the game by five points, 15.13 (103) d. 14.14 (98). It was the largest three-quarter time deficit overcome in a VFA/VFL game since 1949.

== See also ==
- List of VFA/VFL premiers
- Australian rules football
- Victorian Football League
- Australian Football League
- 2001 AFL season
