= 2002 VFL season =

121st season of the Victorian Football League

- Date: 5 April – 22 September 2002
- Teams: 16
- Premiers: Geelong reserves 1st premiership
- Runners-up: Port Melbourne; 18th runners-up result
- Minor premiers: Geelong reserves 1st minor premiership

The 2002 VFL season was the 121st season of the Victorian Football League (VFL), a second-tier Australian rules football competition played in the states of Victoria and Tasmania. The season featured 16 clubs and ran from 5 April to 22 September, comprising a 20-match home-and-away season followed by a four-week finals series featuring the top eight clubs.

Geelong reserves won the premiership for the first time, defeating Port Melbourne by 22 points in the 2002 VFL Grand Final.

== Clubs ==
=== Venues and affiliations ===
Club	Home venue(s)	Capacity	AFL affiliation
Bendigo	Queen Elizabeth Oval	10,000	—N/a
Box Hill	Box Hill City Oval	10,000	Hawthorn
Carlton	Optus Oval	35,000	Carlton
Coburg	Coburg City Oval	15,000	Richmond
Essendon	Melbourne Cricket Ground	97,000	Essendon
Essendon	Windy Hill	10,000	Essendon
Frankston	Frankston Park	5,000	—N/a
Geelong	Skilled Stadium	28,000	Geelong
Murray Kangaroos	Coburg City Oval	12,000	Kangaroos
Murray Kangaroos	Lavington Sports Ground	20,000	Kangaroos
North Ballarat	Northern Oval	11,000	—N/a
Northern Bullants	Preston City Oval	5,000	—N/a
Port Melbourne	TEAC Oval	6,000	Sydney
Sandringham	Trevor Barker Beach Oval	6,000	Melbourne
Springvale	Moorabbin Oval	8,000	St Kilda
Springvale	Shepley Oval	4,000	St Kilda
Tasmania	Bellerive Oval	16,000	—N/a
Tasmania	York Park	15,000	—N/a
Werribee	Chirnside Park	8,000	Western Bulldogs
Williamstown	Williamstown Cricket Ground	6,000	Collingwood

== Home-and-away season ==
=== Round 1 ===
Home team	Home team score	Away team	Away team score	Ground	Date	Time
Tasmania	12.4 (76)	Geelong reserves	12.15 (87)	York Park	Friday, 5 April	6pm
Carlton reserves	6.6 (42)	Port Melbourne	13.18 (96)	Optus Oval	Saturday, 6 April	10:50am
Bendigo Diggers	15.8 (98)	Springvale	21.14 (140)	Queen Elizabeth Oval	Saturday, 6 April	2pm
Coburg Tigers	20.12 (132)	Essendon reserves	14.10 (94)	Coburg City Oval	Saturday, 6 April	1:10pm
Frankston	12.10 (82)	Sandringham	20.12 (132)	Frankston Park	Saturday, 6 April	2pm
North Ballarat	12.8 (80)	Williamstown	17.12 (114)	Northern Oval	Sunday, 7 April	2pm
Werribee	11.13 (79)	Murray Kangaroos	22.7 (139)	Chirnside Park	Sunday, 7 April	2pm
Northern Bullants	13.6 (84)	Box Hill Hawks	23.16 (154)	Preston City Oval	Sunday, 7 April	2pm

=== Round 2 ===
Home team	Home team score	Away team	Away team score	Ground	Date	Time
Box Hill Hawks	20.17 (137)	Bendigo Diggers	9.6 (60)	Box Hill City Oval	Saturday, 13 April	2pm
Werribee	15.10 (100)	North Ballarat	12.11 (83)	Chirnside Park	Saturday, 13 April	1:10pm
Springvale	14.16 (100)	Frankston	7.6 (48)	Moorabbin	Saturday, 13 April	2pm
Williamstown	19.10 (124)	Carlton reserves	18.15 (123)	W.C.G.	Saturday, 13 April	2pm
Sandringham	13.10 (88)	Coburg Tigers	10.11 (71)	Trevor Barker Beach Oval	Sunday, 14 April	2pm
Port Melbourne	12.10 (82)	Tasmania	14.13 (97)	TEAC Oval	Sunday, 14 April	2pm
Murray Kangaroos	14.12 (96)	Geelong reserves	12.15 (87)	Coburg City Oval	Sunday, 14 April	2pm
Northern Bullants	14.11 (95)	Essendon reserves	13.11 (89)	Preston City Oval	Sunday, 14 April	2pm

=== Round 3 ===
Home team	Home team score	Away team	Away team score	Ground	Date	Time
Frankston	9.8 (62)	Carlton reserves	15.15 (105)	Frankston Oval	Saturday, 20 April	1:10pm
Tasmania	22.10 (142)	Essendon reserves	17.11 (113)	North Hobart Oval	Saturday, 20 April	1:10pm
Geelong reserves	21.17 (143)	Springvale	7.10 (52)	Skilled Stadium	Sunday, 21 April	10:50am
Box Hill Hawks	18.17 (125)	Williamstown	13.4 (82)	Box Hill City Oval	Sunday, 21 April	2pm
North Ballarat	9.10 (64)	Sandringham	14.13 (97)	Northern Oval	Sunday, 21 April	2pm
Northern Bullants	10.10 (70)	Werribee	18.16 (124)	Preston City Oval	Sunday, 21 April	2pm
Murray Kangaroos	13.14 (92)	Port Melbourne	12.10 (82)	Coburg City Oval	Sunday, 21 April	2pm
Bendigo Diggers	15.6 (96)	Coburg Tigers	17.11 (113)	Queen Elizabeth Oval	Sunday, 21 April	2pm

=== Round 4 ===
Home team	Home team score	Away team	Away team score	Ground	Date	Time
Tasmania	11.12 (78)	Frankston	11.6 (72)	North Hobart Oval	Thursday, 25 April	12:30pm
Murray Kangaroos	10.9 (69)	Carlton reserves	15.9 (99)	Coburg City Oval	Saturday, 27 April	2pm
Williamstown	13.4 (82)	Essendon reserves	12.11 (83)	W.C.G.	Saturday, 27 April	1:10pm
Geelong reserves	31.17 (203)	Bendigo Diggers	6.6 (42)	Skilled Stadium	Saturday, 27 April	2pm
Northern Bullants	11.8 (74)	North Ballarat	14.6 (90)	Preston City Oval	Sunday, 28 April	2pm
Coburg Tigers	16.9 (105)	Box Hill Hawks	13.14 (92)	Coburg City Oval	Sunday, 28 April	2pm
Port Melbourne	14.15 (99)	Springvale	11.15 (81)	TEAC Oval	Sunday, 28 April	2pm
Sandringham	11.14 (80)	Werribee	11.17 (83)	Trevor Barker Beach Oval	Sunday, 28 April	2pm

=== Round 5 ===
Home team	Home team score	Away team	Away team score	Ground	Date	Time
Tasmania	12.7 (79)	Coburg Tigers	19.15 (129)	North Hobart Oval	Saturday, 4 May	2pm
Williamstown	10.17 (77)	Springvale	11.15 (81)	W.C.G.	Saturday, 4 May	1:10pm
Box Hill Hawks	22.13 (145)	Murray Kangaroos	17.14 (116)	Box Hill City Oval	Sunday, 5 May	2pm
North Ballarat	15.8 (98)	Frankston	13.11 (89)	Northern Oval	Sunday, 5 May	2pm
Bendigo Diggers	11.10 (76)	Essendon reserves	27.17 (179)	Queen Elizabeth Oval	Sunday, 5 May	2pm
Geelong reserves	14.11 (95)	Northern Bullants	11.13 (79)	Skilled Stadium	Sunday, 5 May	2pm
Sandringham	18.24 (132)	Port Melbourne	13.10 (88)	Trevor Barker Beach Oval	Sunday, 5 May	2pm
Werribee	15.14 (104)	Carlton reserves	8.7 (55)	Chirnside Park	Sunday, 5 May	2pm

=== Round 6 ===
Home team	Home team score	Away team	Away team score	Ground	Date	Time
Bendigo Diggers	11.7 (73)	Tasmania	23.12 (150)	Queen Elizabeth Oval	Saturday, 11 May	1pm
Frankston	11.12 (78)	Northern Bullants	20.12 (132)	Frankston Oval	Saturday, 11 May	2pm
Sandringham	12.8 (80)	Springvale	11.15 (81)	Trevor Barker Beach Oval	Saturday, 11 May	2pm
Williamstown	11.9 (75)	Werribee	16.14 (110)	W.C.G.	Saturday, 11 May	2pm
Carlton reserves	18.12 (120)	Essendon reserves	14.9 (93)	Optus Oval	Saturday, 11 May	2pm
Murray Kangaroos	18.19 (127)	North Ballarat	15.5 (95)	Coburg City Oval	Sunday, 12 May	2pm
Box Hill Hawks	18.11 (119)	Geelong reserves	15.10 (100)	Box Hill City Oval	Sunday, 12 May	2pm
Port Melbourne	14.15 (99)	Coburg Tigers	8.10 (58)	TEAC Oval	Sunday, 12 May	2pm

=== Round 7 ===
Home team	Home team score	Away team	Away team score	Ground	Date	Time
Port Melbourne	13.12 (90)	Werribee	12.8 (80)	TEAC Oval	Saturday, 18 May	2pm
Springvale	7.10 (52)	Essendon reserves	15.13 (103)	Shepley Oval	Saturday, 18 May	2pm
Carlton reserves	9.10 (64)	Box Hill Hawks	18.15 (123)	Princes Park	Saturday, 18 May	2pm
Tasmania	10.8 (68)	Murray Kangaroos	14.15 (99)	York Park	Saturday, 18 May	6pm
North Ballarat	7.10 (52)	Coburg Tigers	12.4 (76)	Northern Oval	Sunday, 19 May	2pm
Geelong reserves	22.8 (140)	Frankston	11.8 (74)	Skilled Stadium	Sunday, 19 May	2pm
Sandringham	20.22 (142)	Bendigo Diggers	5.8 (38)	Trevor Barker Beach Oval	Sunday, 19 May	2pm
Northern Bullants	12.8 (80)	Williamstown	18.12 (120)	Preston City Oval	Sunday, 19 May	2pm

=== Round 8 ===
Home team	Home team score	Away team	Away team score	Ground	Date	Time
Geelong reserves	13.8 (86)	Werribee	10.7 (67)	Skilled Stadium	Saturday, 25 May	10:50am
Tasmania	13.16 (94)	Carlton reserves	19.15 (129)	North Hobart Oval	Saturday, 25 May	1:10pm
Box Hill Hawks	22.15 (147)	North Ballarat	8.8 (56)	Box Hill City Oval	Saturday, 25 May	2pm
Williamstown	22.19 (151)	Frankston	12.7 (79)	W.C.G.	Saturday, 25 May	2pm
Murray Kangaroos	18.6 (114)	Sandringham	14.18 (102)	Lavington Sports Ground	Sunday, 26 May	2pm
Coburg Tigers	20.8 (128)	Springvale	11.7 (73)	Coburg City Oval	Sunday, 26 May	2pm
Essendon reserves	18.3 (111)	Port Melbourne	16.13 (109)	Windy Hill	Sunday, 26 May	2pm
Bendigo Diggers	8.9 (57)	Northern Bullants	30.19 (199)	Queen Elizabeth Oval	Sunday, 26 May	2pm

=== Round 9 ===
Home team	Home team score	Away team	Away team score	Ground	Date	Time
Frankston	7.9 (51)	Box Hill Hawks	30.13 (193)	Frankston Oval	Saturday, 1 June	2pm
Carlton reserves	24.20 (164)	Bendigo Diggers	6.5 (41)	Optus Oval	Saturday, 1 June	2pm
North Ballarat	6.6 (42)	Springvale	17.20 (122)	Northern Oval	Saturday, 1 June	2pm
Essendon reserves	11.12 (78)	Murray Kangaroos	26.18 (174)	Windy Hill	Saturday, 1 June	2pm
Sandringham	9.9 (63)	Geelong reserves	16.12 (108)	Trevor Barker Beach Oval	Sunday, 2 June	2pm
Werribee	12.11 (83)	Coburg Tigers	14.11 (95)	Chirnside Park	Sunday, 2 June	2pm
Port Melbourne	20.10 (130)	Williamstown	16.19 (115)	TEAC Oval	Sunday, 2 June	2pm
Northern Bullants	24.15 (159)	Tasmania	9.5 (59)	Preston City Oval	Sunday, 2 June	2pm

=== Round 10 ===
Home team	Home team score	Away team	Away team score	Ground	Date	Time
Springvale	6.13 (49)	Northern Bullants	9.10 (64)	Moorabbin Oval	Saturday, 8 June	1:10pm
Coburg Tigers	10.6 (66)	Murray Kangaroos	16.13 (109)	Coburg City Oval	Saturday, 8 June	2pm
Carlton reserves	6.10 46	Geelong reserves	24.16 (160)	Optus Oval	Saturday, 8 June	2pm
Port Melbourne	25.15 (163)	North Ballarat	13.8 (86)	TEAC Oval	Saturday, 8 June	2pm
Bendigo Diggers	7.10 (52)	Werribee	17.16 (116)	Queen Elizabeth Oval	Sunday, 9 June	2pm
Tasmania	11.8 (74)	Box Hill Hawks	11.8 (74)	Fairway Park, Ulverstone	Sunday, 9 June	2pm
Williamstown	12.13 (85)	Sandringham	13.14 (92)	W.C.G.	Sunday, 9 June	2pm
Essendon reserves	18.12 (120)	Frankston	17.10 (112)	Northern Oval	Sunday, 9 June	2pm

=== Round 11 ===
Home team	Home team score	Away team	Away team score	Ground	Date	Time
Springvale	14.14 (98)					

== Ladder ==
2002 VFL season
Pos	Team	Pld	W	L	D	PF	PA	PP	Pts	Qualification
1	Geelong reserves (P)	20	17	3	0	2171	1377	157.7	68	Finals series
2	Werribee	20	16	4	0	2233	1450	154.0	64	Finals series
3	Coburg	20	16	4	0	2019	1466	137.7	64	Finals series
4	Port Melbourne	20	14	6	0	2097	1780	117.8	56	Finals series
5	Box Hill	20	12	7	1	2235	1758	127.1	50	Finals series
6	Williamstown	20	11	9	0	1997	1821	109.7	44	Finals series
7	Murray Kangaroos	20	10	9	1	2018	1949	103.5	42	Finals series
8	Sandringham	20	10	10	0	1831	1768	103.6	40	Finals series
9	Carlton reserves	20	10	10	0	1785	1807	98.8	40	
10	Essendon reserves	20	10	10	0	2091	2144	97.5	40	
11	Springvale	20	9	11	0	1654	1748	94.6	36	
12	Tasmania	20	8	11	1	1730	1942	89.1	34	
13	Northern Bullants	20	6	14	0	1824	2121	86.0	24	
14	North Ballarat	20	5	15	0	1485	2024	73.4	20	
15	Frankston	20	4	16	0	1530	2258	67.8	16	
16	Bendigo	20	0	19	1	1266	2553	49.6	2	

Rules for classification: 1) points; 2) percentage; 3) number of points for.
(P) Premiers

=== Finals series ===
Qualifying and elimination finals
31 August, North Port Oval
1	Geelong	16.14 (110)
4	Port Melbourne	18.9 (117)
August 31, Box Hill City Oval
5	Box Hill	9.7 (61)
8	Sandringham	8.15 (63)
September 1, W.C.G.
6	Williamstown	14.14 (98)
7	Murray Kangaroos	18.18 (126)
September 1, North Port Oval
2	Werribee	13.13 (91)
3	Coburg	14.6 (90)

Semi-finals
September 8, North Port Oval
Geelong	18.15 (123)
Sandringham	4.9 (33)
September 7, North Port Oval
Coburg	14.15 (99)
Murray Kangaroos	11.8 (74)

Preliminary finals
September 14, North Port Oval
Port Melbourne	13.10 (88)
Coburg	12.13 (85)
September 15, North Port Oval
Werribee	9.11 (65)
Geelong	12.20 (92)

Grand final
September 22, Optus Oval
Port Melbourne	12.11 (83)
Geelong	15.15 (105)

=== Grand Final ===
2002 VFL Grand Final
Sunday 22 September (2:10 pm)	Port Melbourne	def. by	Geelong	Optus Oval (crowd: 11,500)
2.3 (15); 7.5 (47); 12.8 (80); 12.11 (83)	Q1; Q2; Q3; Final	3.2 (20); 7.6 (48); 9.12 (66); 15.15 (105)	Norm Goss Memorial Medal: James Rahilly (Geelong); Television broadcast: ABC
Stevens 2, Gill 2, Ablett, Buchanan, Evans, O'Keefe, Phibbs, Rix, Robertson, Schneider	Goals	Mensch 3, S. Johnson 2, Ablett, Chapman, Chatfield, Gardiner, Hunt, McCarthy, McGrath, O'Brien, Slade, White
Brockman, Obst, Rose, R O'Loughlin, McMahon, O'Keefe	Best	Rahilly, Slade, Mensch, Bartel, Chapman, McGrath

== Awards ==
- The Jim 'Frosty' Miller Medal was won for the fourth consecutive year by Nick Sautner (Frankston), who kicked 93 goals.
- The J. J. Liston Trophy was won by Sam Mitchell (Box Hill). In the most dominant Liston Trophy performance in history, Mitchell polled 31 votes in only eleven games, including ten best-on-ground performances. Dean Talbot (Coburg) was second with 19 votes, and Mark Bradley (Bendigo) was third with 18 votes.
- The Fothergill–Round Medal was won by Michael Firrito (Box Hill).
- Williamstown won the reserves premiership. Williamstown 11.15 (81) defeated Werribee 10.14 (74) in the Grand Final, held as a curtain-raiser to the Seniors Grand Final on 22 September.

== Notable events ==
- In Round 13, Port Melbourne 11.5 (71) trailed Box Hill 18.14 (122) by 51 points at three-quarter time, before kicking nine goals to no score in the final quarter to win the game by nine points, 20.11 (131) d. 18.14 (122).
- The round 17 match between Coburg and Sandringham had its start time moved from 2pm to 1:10pm to allow for an ABC television broadcast.

== See also ==
- List of VFA/VFL premiers
- Australian rules football
- Victorian Football League
- Australian Football League
- 2002 AFL season
