= Tim McGrath =

Australian rules footballer

Personal information
- Full name: Timothy McGrath
- Nickname: Bluey
- Born: 7 October 1970 (age 56)
- Height: 190 cm (6 ft 3 in)
- Weight: 94 kg (207 lb)

Playing career^{1}
| Years | Club | Games (Goals) |
| 1989–1991 | North Melbourne | 7 (0) |
| 1992–2002 | Geelong | 219 (18) |
| Total | | 226 (18) |
- ^{1} Playing statistics correct to the end of 2002.

Career highlights
- VFL premiership player: 2002; Morrish Medal: 1988

Timothy McGrath (born 7 October 1970) is a former Australian rules footballer for the North Melbourne Football Club from 1989 to 1991, and the Geelong Football Club from 1992 to 2002, in the Australian Football League (AFL), which was known as the Victorian Football League (VFL) when McGrath made his debut for North Melbourne in 1989.

== Career ==
=== VFL career ===
McGrath had a successful career in the VFL Under 19s when he won the Morrish Medal in 1988 as the best player in that competition. That same year under coach Denis Pagan, McGrath, along with future adversary, Wayne Carey, would play in North Melbourne's Under 19s Premiership team.

=== VFL/AFL career ===
McGrath made his VFL/AFL debut for North Melbourne in round nine of the 1989 VFL season, but only managed seven games in his three seasons with the club. He was traded to Geelong before the 1992 AFL season, where he debuted in the first round against Hawthorn. McGrath's first game was unimpressive, as he had found himself playing on Hawthorn's champion full-forward Jason Dunstall, who equalled his own record of the most goals in an opening round with 12 goals, a feat which he had previously achieved two years earlier, also against Geelong. Despite the unimpressive start by McGrath, he found a role as a Centre half-back and played 26 games for the season, including in the Grand Final loss against West Coast. He also finished second to Ken Hinkley in the club's best and fairest award, the Carji Greeves Medal. McGrath was also a member of Geelong's 1994 and 1995 grand final teams.

McGrath is well known for his battles with North Melbourne's champion centre-half forward Wayne Carey, whom McGrath beat on several occasions. McGrath's battles with Carey are considered second only to the Carey-Jakovich ones. Tim McGrath was also instantly recognisable with his bright red hair.

In 2002, McGrath found it hard to fit into the Geelong senior team as Matthew Scarlett and Tom Harley assumed responsibility for Geelong's backline. McGrath would captain Geelong's VFL premiership team against Port Melbourne. He would finish second in the VFL team's best and fairest award to former senior team mate, David Mensch.

After his retirement, he had played 212 senior games for the club.

=== 2002 Bali bombings ===
After his retirement from AFL football at the end of the 2002 season, McGrath was one of 21 Geelong players that were in Bali at the time when the 2002 Bali bombings occurred on 12 October 2002. McGrath and his team mates were staying at a hotel only 400 metres away from the Sari Club, the scene of the bombings, and they had spent the entire week partying at the Sari Club, but on the night of the attacks, which was the final night of their trip, they decided to hang out at their hotel instead. McGrath stated afterwards that all the players were OK, but were upset about what had happened, and therefore did not wish to comment on the events that had occurred.
