= 2008 VFL season =

127th season of the Victorian Football League

- Teams: 14
- Premiers: North Ballarat; 1st premiership
- Minor premiers: Port Melbourne; 18th minor premiership
- Leading goalkicker: Nick Sautner (Sandringham − 74 goals)
- Matches played: 149

The 2008 VFL season was the 127th season of the Victorian Football League (VFL), a second-tier Australian rules football competition played in the states of Victoria and Tasmania.

The premiership was won by the North Ballarat Football Club, defeating Port Melbourne by 45 points in the Grand Final on 26 September. It was the first VFL premiership in North Ballarat's history.

== League membership and affiliations ==
Prior to the 2008 season, there were several changes to the VFL-AFL reserves affiliations:

- Collingwood ended its seven-year affiliation with Williamstown, and began fielding its own reserves team in the VFL, having previously done so in the 2000 season.
- Western Bulldogs ended its eight-year affiliation with Werribee, and entered a new affiliation with Williamstown.
- North Melbourne ended its two-year partial affiliation with Tasmania. Unlike many other VFL/AFL affiliations, which had strengthened their VFL clubs, the North Melbourne–Tasmania alignment had been very unpopular amongst Tasmanian fans, and significantly harmed the VFL club's standing within the state. Tasmania continued to contest the VFL as a stand-alone senior club, and North Melbourne and entered a new partial affiliation with Werribee. North Melbourne's other partial affiliation with North Ballarat was unchanged.

As a result, the size of the VFL increased to fourteen teams: nine VFL-AFL affiliations, two AFL reserves teams and three stand-alone VFL clubs.

=== VFL–AFL alignments ===
Bendigo Bombers	Essendon
Box Hill Hawks	Hawthorn
Casey Scorpions	Melbourne
Coburg Tigers	Richmond
Collingwood	Collingwood
Frankston	
Geelong	Geelong
North Ballarat	North Melbourne
Northern Bullants	Carlton
Port Melbourne	
Sandringham	St Kilda
Tasmania	
Werribee	North Melbourne
Williamstown	Western Bulldogs

== VFL season ==
Home \ Away	BEN	BOX	CAS	COB	COL	FRA	GEE	NBR	NBU	PMB	SAN	TAS	WER	WIL
Bendigo Bombers			92–133			83–80	117–69	99–112	98–66			119–90		90–127
Box Hill Hawks	84–119		94–61	70–122	86–112		90–104			92–140	76–164	85–88	90–82	
Casey Scorpions	80–51	122–89			71–28	110–72	117–78		164–46		91–59	137–97		
Coburg Tigers	145–94	79–67	98–151		121–68		178–103	91–92		58–133				
Collingwood reserves	136–46					98–105	67–123	46–125	42–117	87–74				68–102
Frankston Dolphins	120–63	62–69		92–71	83–100				97–81	92–66		161–95	148–52	
Geelong reserves		131–81		51–85	77–78			52–84	100–111			96–68	140–87	112–80
North Ballarat Roosters	112–60	126–56		96–57		129–93	117–86				86–70	115–66	123–94	115–68
Northern Bullants		56–92		107–104	128–77			105–63		52–103	91–87	84–74	87–103	69–115
Port Melbourne Borough	150–65		106–76	155–107		109–51		108–87			109–108		168–108	
Sandringham Zebras	159–89		119–82		79–49	90–102			105–60	75–142		163–76		105–119
Tasmanian Devils			111–92	101–95			125–101		86–91	112–115	51–203		56–121	49–200
Werribee Tigers	115–95		131–90	66–103	126–71	108–103	114–93			115–100	93–87			73–129
Williamstown Seagulls		153–90	111–95	92–110	162–94	121–107		123–106		151–114	130–66			

Updated to match(es) played on Round 16. Source:
Legend: Blue = home team win; Yellow = draw; Red = away team win.

== Ladder ==
2008 VFL Ladder
Pos	Team	Pld	W	L	D	PF	PA	PP	Pts	
1	Port Melbourne	16	13	3	0	1788	1274	140.3	52	Finals
2	North Ballarat (P)	16	13	3	0	1983	1463	135.5	52	Finals
3	Williamstown	16	12	4	0	1892	1436	131.8	48	Finals
4	Werribee	16	10	6	0	1672	1382	121.0	40	Finals
5	Casey Scorpions	16	9	7	0	1588	1683	94.4	36	Finals
6	Coburg	16	8	8	0	1568	1445	108.5	32	Finals
7	Frankston	16	8	8	0	1624	1538	105.6	32	Finals
8	Northern Bullants	16	8	8	0	1351	1510	89.5	32	Finals
9	Sandringham	16	7	9	0	1739	1446	120.3	28	
10	Geelong reserves	16	6	10	0	1516	1699	89.2	24	
11	Bendigo	16	5	11	0	1380	1778	77.6	20	
12	Collingwood reserves	16	5	11	0	1221	1625	75.1	20	
13	Box Hill	16	4	12	0	1311	1721	76.2	16	
14	Tasmania	16	4	12	0	1345	1978	68.0	16	

Rules for classification: 1) points; 2) percentage; 3) number of points for.
(P) Premiers

== Finals series ==
Qualifying and elimination finals
September 7, TEAC Oval
1	Port Melbourne	20.10 (130)
4	Werribee	6.20 (56)
September 6, Casey Fields
5	Casey Scorpions	13.10 (88)
8	Northern Bullants	12.11 (83)
September 6, TEAC Oval
6	Coburg	14.11 (95)
7	Frankston	14.17 (101)
September 7, AUSTAR Arena
2	North Ballarat	15.16 (106)
3	Williamstown	12.14 (86)

Semi-finals
September 14, TEAC Oval
Werribee	19.16 (130)
Casey Scorpions	9.7 (61)
September 13, TEAC Oval
Williamstown	13.14 (92)
Frankston	12.19 (91)

Preliminary finals
September 20, TEAC Oval
Port Melbourne	16.21 (117)
Williamstown	13.18 (96)
September 21, TEAC Oval
North Ballarat	13.14 (92)
Werribee	11.14 (80)

Grand final
September 26, Telstra Dome
North Ballarat	18.12 (120)
Port Melbourne	11.9 (75)

== Season awards ==
=== Best and fairest ===
The VFL Best and Fairest is awarded the J. J. Liston Trophy.

Rank	Player	Team	Votes
1	James Podsiadly	Werribee	16
=2	Peter Summers	Sandringham	15
=2	Brett Johnson	Williamstown	15
=4	Greg Tivendale	Coburg	14
=4	Brett Goodes	North Ballarat	14
=4	Paul Kennedy	Frankston	14

=== Leading Goalkickers ===
The VFL Leading Goalkicker at the end of the regular season is awarded the Jim 'Frosty' Miller Medal. The 2008 winner was Nick Sautner of the Sandringham Zebras.

Rank	Player	Team	No. Games	Total Goals
1	Nick Sautner	Sandringham	16	74
2	James Podsiadly	Werribee	20	73
3	Justin Berry	Frankston	20	50
4	Adrian Bonaddio	Port Melbourne	20	49
=5	Patrick Rose	Williamstown Seagulls	20	48
=5	Robin Nahas	Port Melbourne	20	48

=== Other ===
- The Fothergill–Round Medal was won by Robin Nahas (Port Melbourne).
- Williamstown won the reserves premiership. Williamstown 16.17 (113) defeated Box Hill 11.16 (82) in the Grand Final, held as a curtain-raiser to the Seniors First Preliminary Final on 20 September.

== Notable events ==
- The timing of the grand final was shifted to the Friday night immediately before the AFL Grand Final, after many years of having been played on the preceding Sunday. This shift in timing lasted only two seasons.
- Starting from this season, the TAC Cup under-18s grand final was played as a curtain-raiser to the VFL grand final, having previously been a curtain-raiser to the AFL Grand Final. The VFL reserves grand final was shifted to the previous week, and was thereafter played as a curtain-raiser to one of the senior preliminary finals.
