= 1899 VFA season =

23rd season of the Victorian Football Association

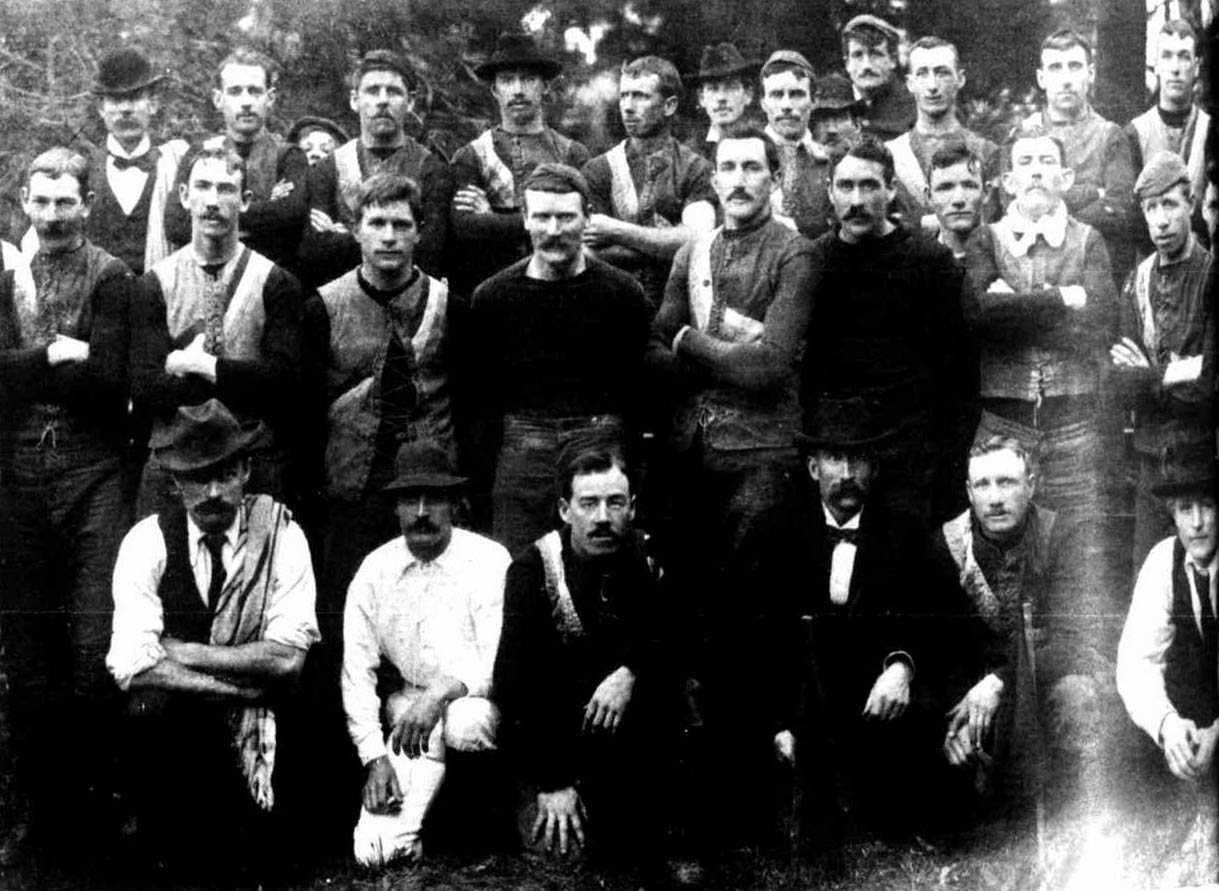
- Footscray – 1899 VFA premiers

Overview
- Teams: 8
- Premiers: Footscray; 2nd premiership

The 1899 VFA season was the 23rd season of the Victorian Football Association (VFA), an Australian rules football competition played in the state of Victoria.

The premiership was won by the Footscray Football Club for the second time in the club's history, and the second in a sequence of three premierships won consecutively from 1898 to 1900.

== Association membership ==
The size of the association increased from six teams to eight in 1899, with two senior clubs joining the association: Prahran and West Melbourne. West Melbourne was invited to join the association as a senior club after having previously competed in the Victorian Junior Football Association; it accepted the invitation, but with no ground of suitable standard available in its district, West Melbourne shared tenancy of the North Melbourne Recreation Reserve as a venue for home matches. Prahran was newly formed as a senior club in 1899; it was the second time that Prahran had been represented by a senior club in the VFA, after a previous unrelated Prahran club had competed from 1886 to 1887 before merging with neighbouring St Kilda. The new club played its matches at the Hawksburn Cricket Ground (Toorak Park) in Armadale.

== Ladder ==
The premiership was decided on the basis of the best record across twenty-one rostered matches, with each club playing the others three times. For the first time, each team had a calculated 'average' (known today as 'percentage'), calculated as the ratio of points scored to points conceded; this was used to break ties in the final placings.

1899 VFA ladder
Pos	Team	Pld	W	L	D	PF	PA	PR	Pts
1	Footscray (P)	21	18	3	0	1078	448	2.406	72
2	North Melbourne	21	17	4	0	1140	664	1.717	68
3	Port Melbourne	21	13	8	0	869	780	1.114	52
4	Williamstown	21	11	10	0	694	647	1.073	44
5	Prahran	21	8	13	0	678	897	0.756	32
6	Richmond	21	8	13	0	655	909	0.721	32
7	West Melbourne	21	6	15	0	759	861	0.882	24
8	Brunswick	21	3	18	0	507	1174	0.432	12

Rules for classification: 1) points; 2) percentage; 3) number of points for.
(P) Premiers

== Notable events ==
- The leading goalkicker for the season was Daily of Footscray (39 goals).
