= Alan Wickes =

Australian rules footballer and administrator

Personal information
- Full name: Alan George Wickes
- Born: 27 July 1939 (age 87)
- Original team: Frankston
- Height: 185 cm (6 ft 1 in)
- Weight: 84 kg (185 lb)

Playing career^{1}
Years	Club	Games (Goals)
1959–1961	Collingwood	14 (1)
- ^{1} Playing statistics correct to the end of 1961.

Alan George Wickes (born 27 July 1939) is a former Australian rules football player and administrator, who played for the Collingwood Football Club in the Victorian Football League (VFL), and later served as president of the Victorian Football Association. He was awarded the Medal of the Order of Australia in the 2021 Australia Day Honours.

Following his brief VFL career with Collingwood, Wickes returned the Frankston Football Club, which was playing in the Mornington Peninsula Football League. He served as coach from 1962 until 1965, and later as president of the club following its admission to the Victorian Football Association in two stints between 1971–1975 and 1977–1979. He served on the VFA board of management through the 1970s. While at Frankston, Wickes was instrumental in the establishment of the Frankston District Junior Football League.

In 1981, Wickes challenged and defeated 27-year incumbent Alex Gillon for the presidency of the VFA. Wickes served as president for a difficult four season tenure, at a time when the popularity and profitability of the Association was declining rapidly, in part due to the loss of television coverage and the expansion of the VFL into the Sunday football market. He oversaw restructure of the second division in 1982, the expansion of the Association into the outer suburbs (incorporating clubs including Springvale, Kilsyth and Berwick), and made an unsuccessful attempt to expand the VFA to thirty teams. Wickes stood down as president after the 1984 season, expressing frustration at poor quality of club-level administration in the VFA at the time.

Wickes has remained active in sports administration and community events in Frankston, and has served as president of the Frankston and District Junior Football League in the late 2000s.
