= 2000 VFL season =

119th season of the Victorian Football League

- Date: 16 March – 27 August 2000
- Teams: 18
- Premiers: Sandringham; 7th premiership
- Runners-up: North Ballarat; 2nd runners-up result
- Minor premiers: Sandringham; 5th minor premiership
- J. J. Liston Trophy: David Robbins (Springvale – 21 votes)
- Frosty Miller Medallist: Nick Sautner (Sandringham – 60 goals)

The 2000 VFL season was the 119th season of the Victorian Football League (VFL), a second-tier Australian rules football competition played in the state of Victoria. The season began on 16 March and concluded on 27 August, comprising a 19-match home-and-away season, followed by a four-week finals series.

Sandringham won the premiership for the seventh time, defeating North Ballarat by 31 points in the 2000 VFL Grand Final.

The league underwent significant changes for the 2000 season, being merged with the Australian Football League (AFL) reserves competition. Since this season, the VFL has served as a state-level senior competition in which reserves players and reserves teams from most AFL clubs compete.

== Merger with AFL reserves ==
The Victorian State Football League (VFSL) had operated two open-age senior competitions during the 1990s: the VFL, which it took control of in 1995, and the AFL reserves, which it had operated since 1992. The AFL Reserves competition was contested by the reserves teams of eleven Australian Football League clubs: those of the ten Victorian clubs and that of the Sydney Swans. The VSFL had intended to merge the two into a single competition which would serve as an AFL reserves competition, a state-level senior competition and a development pathway from the 1995 season; however there was such significant opposition from the AFL clubs against abolishing their dedicated reserves competition that they had threatened to use their power to sack the AFL Commission over the changes.
Consequently, the two competitions had run in parallel between 1995 and 1999.

Prior to the 1998 season, the AFL again announced plans to amalgamate the VFL and the AFL reserves into a single competition, giving the clubs two years to make arrangements before the combined competition was to begin from the 2000 season. Although most of the AFL clubs were still opposed to the changes, on this occasion they accepted them.

Under the new arrangement, AFL clubs were given two options: they could continue to operate their own reserves teams, fielding them in the VFL; or, they could enter a reserves affiliation with one or more existing VFL clubs. Under the affiliation structure, listed players who were not selected in the senior AFL team would be made available to play for their affiliated VFL club; the VFL club would then make up the balance of the team from its own playing list.

=== Affiliations and league membership changes ===
Under the new arrangement, four AFL clubs entered into affiliations with existing VFL clubs. These were:

- Hawthorn affiliated with fellow eastern suburban club Box Hill. Box Hill immediately co-branded with Hawthorn, changing its nickname from the Mustangs to the Hawks.
- Western Bulldogs affiliated with fellow western suburban clubs Werribee and Williamstown, with half of its players allocated to each VFL club.
- Melbourne affiliated with Sandringham.
- Sydney entered a partial affiliation with Port Melbourne, the club with which it had shared a zone when it was based in South Melbourne. No more than six of Sydney's reserves players played for Port Melbourne; the rest played for a dedicated Sydney reserves team in the Sydney AFL competition.

A fifth affiliation was established with the creation of a new club, the Murray Kangaroos. The Murray Kangaroos was operated in partnership between the North Melbourne Football Club and the Ovens & Murray Football League, and was based at both Coburg City Oval in Melbourne and the Lavington Sports Ground in Albury. The Murray Kangaroos were affiliated with the Murray Bushrangers from the TAC Cup under-18s competition, which served to complete the VSFL's original vision that all twelve Victorian TAC Cup clubs would be affiliated with a VFL club.

This left six Victorian AFL clubs, all of which entered their reserves teams directly into the VFL. These were: Carlton, Collingwood, Essendon, Geelong, Richmond and St Kilda.

=== Other changes ===
After four years, the merger between Preston Bullants senior club and the Northern Knights TAC Cup club was terminated, and the two clubs returned to being separate entities. The senior club, which had competed as the Preston Knights since 1996, became known as the Northern Bullants, and it returned to the red and white colours that it had worn prior to 1996.

With the increased size of the league, the finals were expanded from five clubs to eight clubs. The VFL adopted the same final eight system which was adopted by the AFL in the same season, replacing the McIntyre Final Five which had been in use since 1989.

The Victorian State Football League was superseded by a newly established body, Football Victoria, which administered the league.

=== Summary ===
As a result of this large suite of changes, the size of the VFL grew from eleven to eighteen clubs, the largest it had been since 1987. The size of the competition during the 2000 season set a new record as the largest to contest the premiership in a single division in VFA/VFL history, a mark which stood until 2021. The clubs were:

Stand alone VFL

- Bendigo
- Coburg-Fitzroy
- Frankston
- North Ballarat
- Northern Bullants
- Springvale

AFL reserves teams

- Carlton
- Collingwood
- Essendon
- Geelong
- Richmond
- St Kilda

AFL reserves affiliated

- Box Hill (Hawthorn)
- Murray Kangaroos (Kangaroos)
- Port Melbourne (Sydney)
- Sandringham (Melbourne)
- Werribee (Western Bulldogs)
- Williamstown (Western Bulldogs)

== Ladder ==
Pos	Team	Pld	W	L	D	PF	PA	PP	Pts	Qualification
1	Sandringham (P)	19	16	3	0	2151	1460	147.3	64	Finals series
2	North Ballarat	19	14	5	0	2079	1667	124.7	56	Finals series
3	Carlton (R)	19	14	5	0	2079	1667	124.7	56	Finals series
4	St Kilda (R)	19	13	6	0	2094	1520	137.8	52	Finals series
5	Geelong (R)	19	13	6	0	2017	1723	117.1	52	Finals series
6	Williamstown	19	13	6	0	2006	1746	114.9	52	Finals series
7	Box Hill	19	13	6	0	1892	1647	114.9	52	Finals series
8	Springvale	19	12	6	1	1648	1564	105.4	50	Finals series
9	Werribee	19	10	8	1	2025	1839	110.1	42	
10	Essendon (R)	19	10	9	0	1778	1783	99.7	40	
11	Collingwood (R)	19	9	10	0	1731	1871	92.5	36	
12	Frankston	19	8	10	1	1903	1911	99.6	34	
13	Port Melbourne	19	6	13	0	1787	1858	96.2	24	
14	Murray Kangaroos	19	6	13	0	1632	1850	88.2	24	
15	Coburg-Fitzroy	19	4	15	0	1483	1744	85.0	16	
16	Northern Bullants	19	4	15	0	1495	2226	67.2	16	
17	Richmond (R)	19	3	15	1	1501	2119	70.8	14	
18	Bendigo	19	1	18	0	1316	2413	54.5	4	

Rules for classification: 1) points; 2) percentage; 3) number of points for
(R) Reserves
(P) Premiers

== Finals series ==
Qualifying and elimination finals
7 August, Waverley Park
1	Sandringham	9.14 (68)
4	St Kilda	10.7 (67)
6 August, North Port Oval
5	Geelong	15.11 (101)
8	Springvale	8.12 (60)
5 August, North Port Oval
6	Williamstown	22.17 (149)
7	Box Hill	15.14 (104)
5 August, North Port Oval
2	North Ballarat	17.24(126)
3	Carlton	10.6 (66)

Semi-finals
13 August, North Port Oval
St Kilda	8.14 (62)
Geelong	9.13 (67)
12 August, North Port Oval
Carlton	19.11 (125)
Williamstown	7.9 (51)

Preliminary finals
20 August, North Port Oval
Sandringham	22.23 (155)
Carlton	12.9 (81)
19 August, North Port Oval
Geelong	12.7 (79)
North Ballarat	20.13 (133)

Grand final
27 August, Waverley Park
Sandringham	15.18 (108)
North Ballarat	11.11 (77)

=== Grand Final ===
2000 VFL Grand Final
Sunday 27 August (2:10 pm)	Sandringham	def.	North Ballarat	Waverley Park (crowd: 8,652)
4.6 (30); 8.10 (58); 11.14 (80); 15.18 (108)	Q1; Q2; Q3; Final	0.5 (5); 3.5 (23); 5.8 (38); 11.11 (77)	Umpires: Jeffery, Malcolm, Twitt; Norm Goss Memorial Medal: Richard Maloney (Sandringham)
Sautner 6, Beams 2, Pitt 2, Templeton 2, Febey, Haynes, Williams	Goals	Clarke 2, Peake 2, Power 2, Field, Inkster, Maher, T. Polkinghorne, Snibson

== Awards ==
- The Jim 'Frosty' Miller Medal was won for the second consecutive year by Nick Sautner (Sandringham), who kicked 60 goals.
- The J. J. Liston Trophy was won by David Robbins (Springvale), who polled 23 votes.
- The Fothergill–Round Medal was won by Michael Swan (Port Melbourne).
- Sandringham won the reserves premiership. Sandringham 17.15 (117) defeated Port Melbourne 11.7 (73) in the Grand Final, held as a curtain-raiser to the Seniors Grand Final on 27 August.

== Notable events ==
- The VFL established a second television deal during the 2000 season, with one match played each Monday night and broadcast live on the Seven Network's subscription television channel C7 Sport, in addition to the long-standing weekly Saturday afternoon broadcasts on ABC Victoria. The Monday night fixture was short-lived, and did not survive beyond the 2000 season.
- With the disuse of Waverley Park for Australian Football League games following the opening of Docklands Stadium, Waverley Park became available for VFA/VFL football for the first and only time in its history. Springvale, located only a few kilometres away, played all but its first home game of the season at the ground, and all Monday night games were played at the ground, as well as a few other isolated games and the Grand Final. The Grand Final was the last game of competitive football played on Waverley Park before it was sold to developers.
- Bendigo's six point win against Murray in Round 17 was its final ever win as a stand-alone VFL club. Its remaining 78 games as a stand-alone club (spanning seasons 2000–2002 and 2013–2014 and excluding the period of its reserves affiliation with Essendon) yielded one draw and 77 losses.
- As with other major football leagues, the 2000 season was played a month earlier than usual, to ensure it was finished before the 2000 Sydney Olympics, which began on 15 September.

== See also ==
- 2000 AFL season
