= Murray Kangaroos Football Club =

Murray Kangaroos

Names
- Full name: Murray Kangaroos Football Club
- Nickname(s): MKs, Kangas, Roos, Rooboys

Club details
- Founded: 2000; 26 years ago
- Dissolved: 2002; 24 years ago
- Colours: Royal Blue and White
- Competition: Victorian Football League
- Grounds: Coburg City Oval (capacity: 15,000)
- Lavington Oval (capacity: 20,000)

Uniforms
Home	Away

The Murray Kangaroos Football Club, officially nicknamed the Kangaroos, was an Australian rules football club which competed in the Victorian Football League between 2000 and 2002. The football club was a joint venture between the North Melbourne Football Club and the Ovens and Murray Football League and served as North Melbourne's reserve side.

The Ovens and Murray region was formerly zoned towards North Melbourne, and the club enjoys good support in the area.

== History ==
Following season 1999, the AFL reserves competition was terminated leaving AFL clubs without a place to field their reserves players. The Kangaroos, together with the Ovens and Murray Football League launched their own stand-alone VFL club in the Victorian Football League called the Murray Kangaroos. The club's home games were split between Coburg City Oval in Melbourne, and Lavington Oval in Albury-Wodonga.

The side was made up with players from the Kangaroos, topped up with players from the Ovens and Murray League, and offering a second chance to players from the statewide under-18s Murray Bushrangers team who had missed out on the draft.

At the end of 2002, the Kangaroos disbanded the club citing pressure from the AFL, and cost-cutting measures (the club cost around $100,000 a year to field). North Melbourne instead decided to align with the Port Melbourne Football Club in a short-term deal.

== Honour roll ==
=== Club records ===
Highest Score	26.18 (174) v Essendon, Round 9, 2002, Windy Hill
Lowest Score	5.9 (39) v Sandringham, Round 16, 2000, Lavington Sports Ground; 5.9 (39) v Coburg, Round 18, 2000, Lavington Sports Ground
Greatest Winning Margin	96 points v Essendon, Round 9, 2002, Windy Hill
Greatest Losing Margin	93 points v Coburg, Round 20, 2001, Coburg City Oval
Lowest Winning Score	13.10 (88) v Preston 9.12 (66), Round 16, 2001, Lavington Sports Ground
Highest Losing Score	17.14 (116) v Box Hill 22.13 (145), Round 5, 2002, Box Hill City Oval; 17.14 (116) v Preston 18.14 (122), Round 11, 2002, Coburg City Oval

== Seasons ==
Premiers	Grand Finalist	Minor premiers	Finals appearance	Wooden spoon	VFL leading goalkicker	VFL best and fairest

Year	League	Finish	W	L	D	Coach	Captain	Best and fairest	Leading goalkicker	Goals	Ref
2000	VFL	14th	6	13	0	Ross Smith		Stuart Cochrane	Kent Kingsley	34	
2001	VFL	4th	13	7	0	Paul Hamilton		Mark Hilton	Leigh Harding	53	
2002	VFL	7th	10	9	1	Paul Hamilton		Adam Lange	Rodney Tregenza	54	
