= Alex Gillon =

Australian civic and sporting administrator

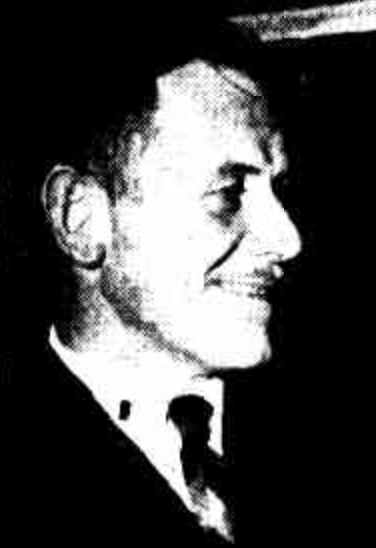

Personal information
- Full name: Alexander George Gillon
- Born: 23 December 1909; Broadmeadows
- Died: 25 August 2007 (aged 97)
- Original team: Brunswick

Playing career
Years	Club	Games (Goals)
1933–1939	Brunswick	
1939	Coburg	

Alexander George Gillon AM OBE (23 December 1909 – 25 August 2007) was an Australian civic and sporting administrator. He was most notable as the longest-serving president of the Victorian Football Association (VFA), and as a mayor of the City of Brunswick.

Gillon was born in Broadmeadows in north-western Melbourne. He played Australian rules football when he was young, and at his peak played 88 games for the Brunswick Football Club in the Victorian Football Association (VFA) during the 1930s, where he was part of Brunswick's 1938 premiership team. He was cleared to Coburg in May 1939 and played there for one season.

After World War II, Gillon took a position on the Brunswick Football Club committee. He served as a club delegate on the VFA Board of Management from 1949 until 1953. Then in February 1954, he successfully challenged Lewis Page for presidency of the VFA. When Gillon took on the presidency, the VFA was in decline and struggling badly compared with the strong position it had enjoyed during the 1940s: crowds were declining due to the abandoning of the popular throw pass rule in 1950, various social and demographic changes in post-war Melbourne were reducing crowds and revenues, and the Association board was suffering from factional fighting as a result of the fall-out from the changes. Gillon soon provided strong leadership, which largely re-unified the Association's board, and the Association began to recover from a situation which threatened its viability.

One of the first challenges Gillon faced during his presidency was grounds control, as there were several bids by other football codes during the 1950s, and then by Victorian Football League (VFL) clubs during the 1960s, to take over the tenancy of VFA grounds; Gillon refused to compromise on the VFA's requirement that clubs had sole winter use of their grounds, which cost Prahran (temporarily) and Moorabbin (permanently) their places in the Association, but it set a strong example that the VFA was prepared to defend itself against stronger opponents, a trait which Gillon carried throughout his presidency. Gillon then oversaw the introduction of Sunday football in 1960, the early 1960s expansion of the Association into the outer suburbs to overcome post-war demographic shifts in the inner suburbs, and the partitioning of the VFA into two divisions in 1961; and after the VFA secured weekly television coverage from 1967, the VFA enjoyed one of its most successful periods ever during the 1970s. Also under Gillon's presidency, however, the VFA's relationship with the VFL soured, culminating in the VFA's expulsion in 1970 from the Australian National Football Council (of which Gillon had served as vice-president during the late 1960s) and a lingering adversarial relationship between the competitions which lasted until the 1980s. When asked about his relationship with the VFL on television during the 1970s, Gillon replied "I don't hate the VFL; I'm just pro-VFA."

Gillon went on to become the VFA's longest-serving president, serving unopposed for 27 seasons from 1954 until 1980, and exceeding the 25-year tenure of J. G. Aikman (1903–1928). In 1981, with the VFA's success of the 1970s beginning to wane and many clubs believing a new direction was required, Gillon was challenged for the presidency and defeated by Alan Wickes. Five years later, Gillon returned as part of the Football Organisation Review Team (FORT), which was formed in 1986 by Wickes' successor, Brook Andersen, to develop a new strategy for the VFA in a changing Victorian football market; the FORT's controversial report, which sought to rationalise the VFA to 12 teams, was rejected by the clubs but was instrumental in shaping the natural contraction of the VFA in the late 1980s.

Outside football, Gillon served a long career in local government. In 1954, he was elected to the council of the City of Brunswick. He was a justice of the peace and a one-time vice-chairman of the Board of Works, before serving as the mayor of Brunswick. Gillon's effectiveness as a civic administrator was well regarded, and he was twice appointed by the State Government to serve as the commissioner of a city outside Brunswick. His first appointment occurred in November 1976, when the 12-man Sunshine council was sacked by the state government due to its financial mismanagement, having left the city $1,700,000 in deficit; Gillon served as the state-appointed commissioner of the City of Sunshine until early 1982, successfully restoring its finances to the point that an elected council could be restored to the city. Later in 1982, the Richmond council was dismissed by the state government following a report which revealed allegations of electoral malpractice and fraud, and Gillon was appointed by the state as commissioner of the City of Richmond, serving in that role until 1988.

For his services to the Brunswick Football Club and the Brunswick Council, the Brunswick Football Ground was renamed the A. G. Gillon Oval in his honour in early 1976. The annual award for the best and fairest player in the VFA Thirds competition (specifically for Division 1 in years when the competition was partitioned) was named the A. G. Gillon Medal in his honour. He was also appointed OBE in the 1976 New Year Honours and a Member of the Order of Australia (AM) in the 1987 Australia Day Honours.
