= Adam Chatfield =

Australian rules footballer

Personal information
- Full name: Adam Chatfield
- Born: 22 June 1979 (age 47)
- Original team: Pennant Hills / NSW/ACT Rams
- Draft: 23rd overall, 1997 National draft
- Height: 189 cm (6 ft 2 in)
- Weight: 83 kg (183 lb)

Playing career^{1}
Years	Club	Games (Goals)
1998–2001	Carlton	1 (0)
- ^{1} Playing statistics correct to the end of 2000.

Career highlights
- VFL premiership player: 2002

Adam Chatfield (born 22 June 1979) is a former Australian rules footballer who played with Carlton in the Australian Football League.

From the NSW/ACT Rams and having tested as the best sprinter in the 1997 AFL draft, Chatfield was drafted by Carlton with the No. 23 draft pick. He spent four years on the Carlton list, but managed only a single senior game before being delisted at the end of 2001. He was drafted in the 2002 rookie draft by Geelong, but failed to play a senior game there in his one-year on the list. He was part of the Geelong reserves 2002 VFL premiership. Since 2003 he has played in the Victorian Amateur Football Association, first for Old Xaverians, then for Prahran/Assumption.

== Sources ==
- Holmesby, Russell & Main, Jim (2009). The Encyclopedia of AFL Footballers. 8th ed. Melbourne: Bas Publishing.
- Adam Chatfield's playing statistics from AFL Tables
- Adam Chatfield's profile at Blueseum
