= Victorian Football League =

Australian rules football league

- Most recent season or competition: 2026 VFL season
- Formerly: Victorian Football Association (1877–1995)
- Founded: 17 May 1877; 149 years ago
- First season: 1877
- Administrator: AFL Victoria; AFL Commission
- No. of teams: 22
- States: (Victoria (state)) Victoria; New South Wales; Queensland; Tasmania
- Current premiers (2026): Box Hill (4th premiership)
- Most premierships: Port Melbourne (17 premierships)
- Broadcaster(s): ABC; 7 Tasmania
- Streaming partner(s): AFL.com.au; Kayo Sports
- Sponsor(s): Smithy's Beer
- Related competitions: VFL Women's; AFL; Talent League
- Official website: vfl.com.au

The Victorian Football League (VFL) is an Australian rules football competition in Australia operated by the Australian Football League (AFL) as a second-tier, regional, semi-professional competition. It includes teams from clubs based in eastern states of Australia: Victoria, New South Wales, Tasmania and Queensland, including reserves teams for the eastern state AFL clubs. It succeeded and continues the competition of the former Victorian Football Association (VFA) which began in 1877. The name of the competition was changed to the Victorian Football League in 1996. Under its VFL brand, the AFL also operates a women's football competition known as VFL Women's, which was established in 2016.

The VFA was formed in 1877 and was the second-oldest Australian rules football league, replacing the loose affiliation of clubs that existed in the early years of the game. It was the top-level club competition in Victoria until 1896, becoming the secondary-level competition from 1897 after its eight strongest clubs seceded to form the Victorian Football League (now AFL). As a secondary-level competition, the VFA enjoyed peaks of popularity, in the 1940s with a faster-paced rival code of rules and in the 1970s by playing on Sundays at a time when its competitor, the VFL, played on Saturdays.

In 1995, the VFA ceased to exist as an independent organisation and control of its football competition was taken over by its former rival, the AFL, which initially operated the competition through its subsidiary, the Victorian State Football League (VSFL). AFL clubs' reserves teams first entered the competition in 2000. In 2021, the competition expanded geographically, when the VFL absorbed the North East Australian Football League (NEAFL) to include clubs from New South Wales and Queensland. As of 2026, the competition includes 22 teams from the eastern states, eight of which have a continuous VFA heritage.

== History ==
=== Victorian Football Association ===
The Victorian Football Association (VFA) was founded on 17 May 1877 at the meeting of club secretaries immediately preceding the 1877 season. It was formed out of a desire to provide a formal administrative structure to the governance of the sport, and it had the power to impose binding decisions on its members on matters including the Laws of the Game, player eligibility and other disputes, as well as to facilitate intercolonial football. Decisions were made based on a vote of the Board of Management, which was composed of two delegates from each senior club, a structure which was retained until the late 1980s. It replaced a system under which the secretaries of the senior clubs met at the beginning of each year to decide on matters of mutual interest, but the system was informal and disputes often went unresolved.

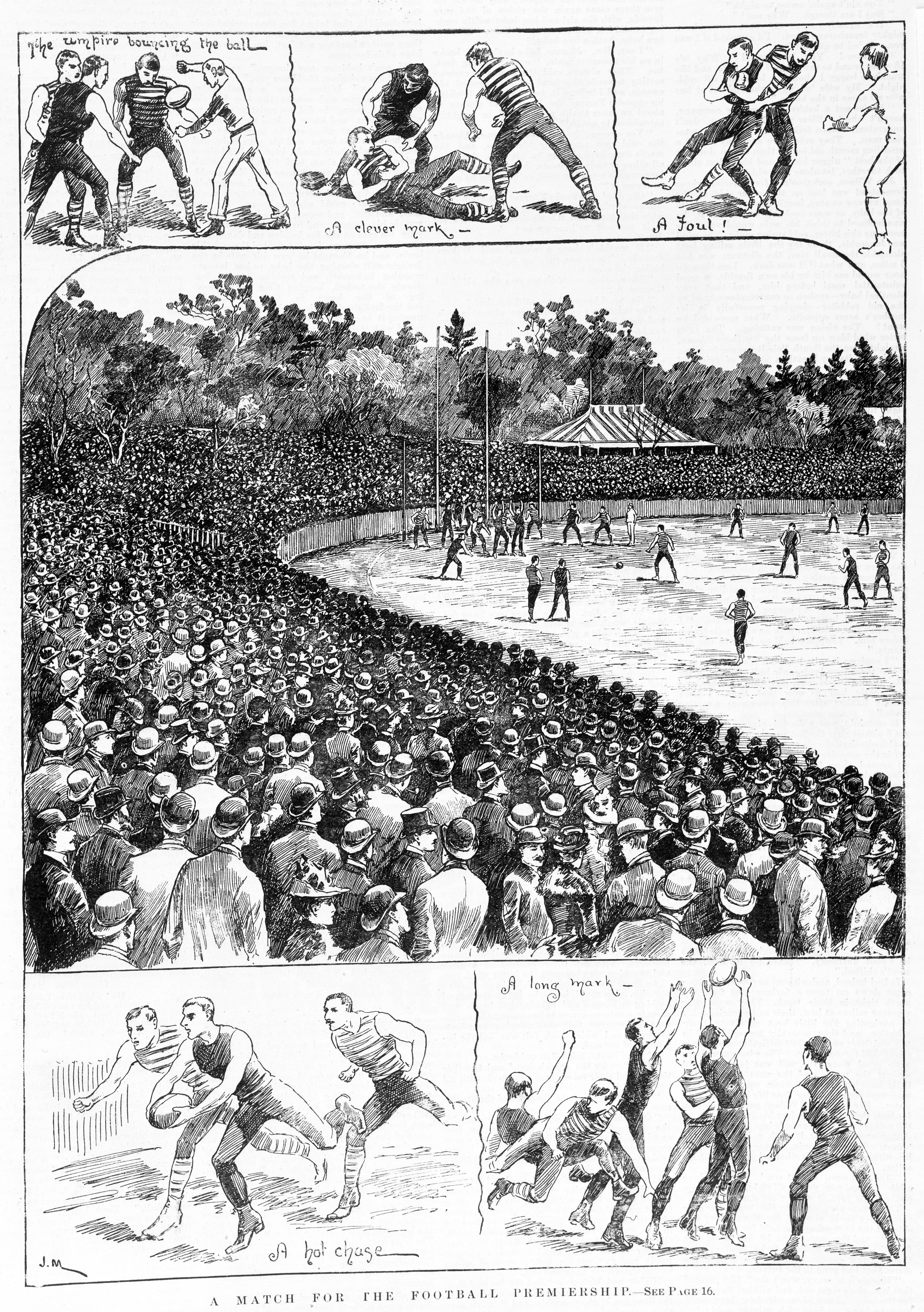
Scenes from an 1891 VFA Premiership Match between Essendon and Carlton

The five foundation senior clubs in the Melbourne metropolitan area were Albert-park, Carlton, Hotham (later North Melbourne), Melbourne and St Kilda. Provincial clubs were also eligible for senior representation on the Association, even though most seldom played matches against the metropolitan teams; Geelong, the nearest provincial club to the metropolis, was the most prominent provincial club, joining the Association in 1877 and playing regularly against metropolitan clubs by 1880. There was no formal system of promotion and relegation between the senior and junior levels, with it largely at a club's discretion whether or not it joined the Association as a paying senior member. The affiliation fee for senior clubs was initially set at one guinea.

Through the first decade of the VFA's existence, the structure of the football season did not change significantly from the informal system which had evolved over previous years. Setting of fixtures was the responsibility of club secretaries rather than the Association itself, and in a typical season, a club could play against other VFA teams, non-VFA clubs, at odds against junior teams (usually twenty players against twenty-three), and in some seasons against intercolonial teams; although as the number of senior clubs increased, the number of matches against non-VFA clubs declined. Prior to the 1888 season, there was no formally endorsed system for awarding a VFA premiership: as had been the case since the early 1870s, the premier club was determined by public and press consensus, which by the mid-1880s was conventionally but informally understood to be the senior club which suffered the fewest losses during the season. Premierships won under this then-informal method are now considered official, and consensus was typically uncontroversial.

In 1888, the VFA first took responsibility for the onfield competition, and introduced its first formal premiership system by adopting a system of premiership points; it also awarded for the first time a premiership cap in the Association's colours to players of the premier team. The Association's influence over the on-field competition grew, and from 1894, the Association assumed responsibility for centrally setting the fixtures and standardising the number of games played by each team.

After the formal introduction of the premiership, the often-changeable collection of senior clubs in the VFA soon became settled at twelve premiership-eligible clubs: Carlton, Essendon, Fitzroy, Footscray, Geelong, Melbourne, North Melbourne, Port Melbourne, Richmond, St Kilda, South Melbourne and Williamstown; they were joined by a thirteenth club, Collingwood, in 1892. Three Ballarat-based clubs – Ballarat, Ballarat Imperial and South Ballarat – were also voting members of the VFA through this time, but were not involved in the onfield premiership.

==== Split (1897–1937) ====
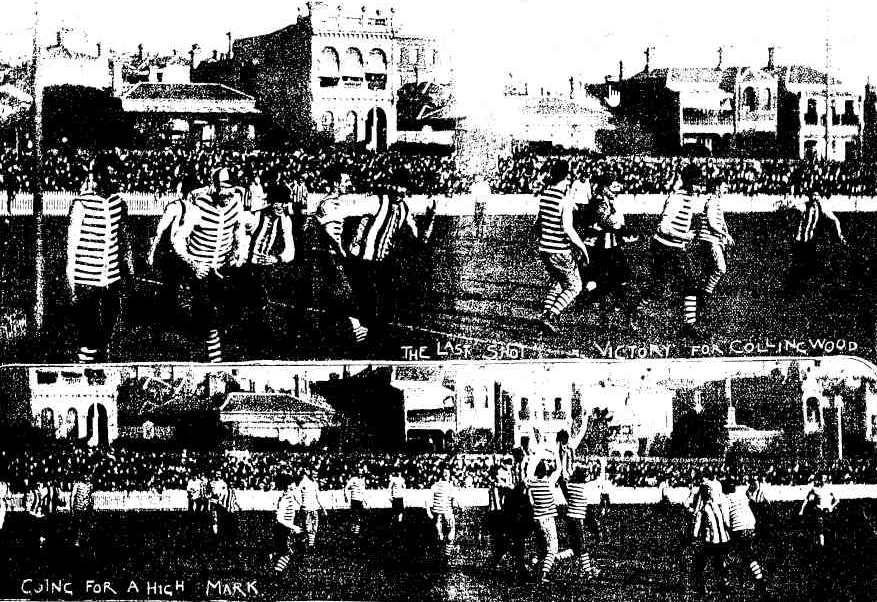
Action from the 1896 VFA Grand Final won by Collingwood over South Melbourne at the East Melbourne Cricket Ground. This was the first Victorian Grand Final and a significant moment in the breakaway movement

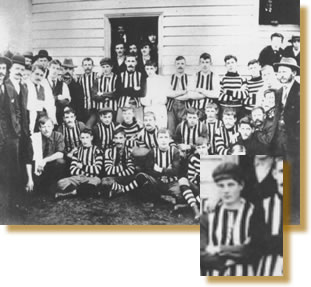
Brunswick during the early 1900s. The highlighted section in the bottom right-hand corner shows the future Australian Prime Minister John Curtin.

During the 1890s, there was an off-field power struggle within the VFA between the stronger and weaker clubs, as the stronger clubs sought greater administrative control commensurate with their relative financial contribution to the game. This came to a head in 1896 when it was proposed that gate profits, which were always lower in matches against the weaker clubs, be shared equally amongst the Association clubs; in response to the threat that this might be endorsed on the votes of the weaker clubs, six of the strongest clubs – Collingwood, Essendon, Fitzroy, Geelong, Melbourne and South Melbourne – seceded from the VFA, inviting Carlton and St Kilda to join them, to form the Victorian Football League (VFL), which became the leading senior football body in Victoria. The remaining VFA clubs – Footscray, North Melbourne, Port Melbourne, Richmond and Williamstown – were given the opportunity to compete as a junior competition under and without representation on the VFL's administration, but rejected the offer and continued as an independent body. The two new competitions competed in parallel from their respective 1897 seasons.

The VFA rebuilt to ten clubs over its first independent decade, mostly by adding leading junior clubs to its ranks such as Brunswick, Prahran, West Melbourne, Essendon Town/Association, Preston, Brighton, Northcote and Hawthorn. Because the VFA was independent from the VFL (and, upon its establishment in 1906, the Australasian Football Council), the VFA had the power to set its own rules. The VFA reduced the number of on-field players from twenty to eighteen in 1897, a move followed by the VFL two years later. The VFA tried reducing the number of players further to 17 in 1908, then to 16 in 1912, before reverting to the national standard 18 in 1919. The VFA went into recess during World War I, with the 1916 and 1917 seasons cancelled and the 1915 and 1918 seasons shortened.

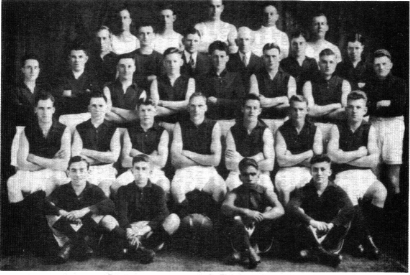
Northcote's premiership side from the 1929 VFA season. Second from right, front row, is Doug Nicholls.

Over the first thirty years of the VFA's independence, its relationship with the VFL was, in general, mutually antagonistic. At different times (1913–1918 and 1923–1925), the two competitions had permit reciprocity agreements in place to prevent one competition from poaching players from the other without a clearance, but these were sporadic and remained in place only when convenient to both competitions. At the same time, the strongest clubs in the VFA often sought to defect to the VFL, which the VFL was happy to encourage when it expanded, and there were ultimately four defections: Richmond in 1908; and Footscray, North Melbourne and Hawthorn in 1925. Attempting to defect was seen as treacherous within the VFA, and clubs which attempted to defect but failed were sometimes expelled from the VFA by the remaining clubs: North Melbourne was expelled from the VFA twice (in 1908 and 1921, before reforming and rejoining on both occasions), and West Melbourne was expelled permanently in 1908.

The loss of the VFA's strongest three clubs to the VFL in 1925 firmly cemented the VFA as the second-tier competition in the state. Between 1925 and 1929, the addition of outer suburban clubs in Coburg (1925), Camberwell (1926), a new club from Preston (1926), Yarraville (1928), Oakleigh (1929) and Sandringham (1929) expanded the VFA back to twelve teams. The relationship with the VFL improved, and a new permit reciprocity agreement was established in 1931.

==== Throw-pass era (1938–1949) ====
In 1938, the VFA made a bold rule change by legalising throwing of the football in general play, provided the throw was underarm with both hands below shoulder height. The change helped to speed up the game, and introduced more run-and-carry play in an era which had previously been dominated by a long-kicking style, proving popular with many spectators. Additionally, the VFA ended its permit agreement with the VFL, and began to aggressively recruit star players by offering salaries well in excess of the maximum set by VFL player payment laws. This included Laurie Nash, Bob Pratt and Ron Todd, who were in the primes of their careers and were considered amongst the best players in the country. These changes gave the VFA a product which could compete with the VFL for public interest, and it made the late 1930s and 1940s one of the most successful periods in the VFA's history. The VFA competition went into recess from 1942 until 1944 due to World War II, but continued to perform strongly upon returning in 1945. The VFA was incorporated in 1946.

While the throw-pass was in effect, particularly during the early 1940s, there were talks between the VFA and VFL towards re-amalgamating the two bodies. Although the throw-pass had been a great success for the VFA, it was felt that a single controlling body for football in Victoria playing under a uniform set of rules was in the best interests of football as a whole. Negotiations for an amalgamation took place over several years, but broke down several times over a variety of issues, including representation at board level, Australian National Football Council representation, and a promotion and relegation structure between the VFA and VFL.

In the end, the two bodies never amalgamated, but the schism ended in 1949 when the bodies re-established a permit reciprocity agreement and the VFA was granted a non-voting position on the Australian National Football Council, later upgraded to a voting position in 1953; as a condition of joining, it was forced to abandon the throw-pass rule and adopt the national standard rules. These changes benefitted Victorian football as a whole, gave the VFA a say in national administration of the game. It also gave the VFA the right to compete in interstate matches, and at interstate carnivals over the 1950s and 1960s, the VFA generally competed at a similar standard to Tasmania as the fourth- or fifth-best team in the competition.

However, joining the ANFC also stripped the VFA of the throw-pass, and therefore of the on-field distinctions which allowed it to compete with the VFL for fans; this, coupled with the increased mobility of suburban Melburnians – who, due to the increased affordability of cars and the lifting in 1950 of wartime travel restrictions, were no longer captive audiences for their local VFA teams – resulted in a significant downturn in most VFA clubs during the 1950s. On-field, the competition became dominated by the few clubs with strong community links such as Port Melbourne, Williamstown, Sandringham, Oakleigh and Moorabbin (who had joined the VFA alongside Box Hill in 1951); the gap between those clubs and the weaker clubs, many of whom were periodically forced to play as amateurs due to a lack of money, grew large and the popularity of the competition declined.

==== Gillon era (1954–1980) ====
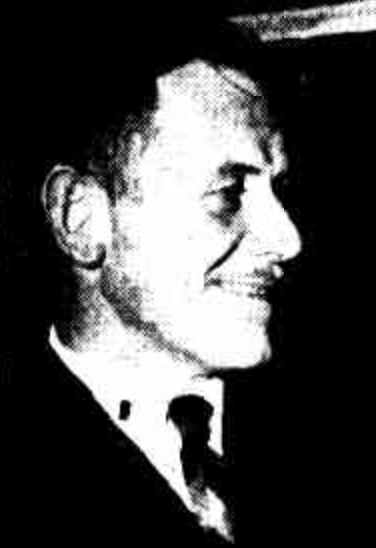
Alex Gillon, the longest-serving president of the VFA

Alex Gillon presided over the VFA from 1954 until 1980. During that time, the VFA underwent a series of changes to reinvigorate it after its post-throw pass decline of the 1950s. Major strategic changes were undertaken, including:

- As Melbourne expanded geographically, the VFA embarked on a deliberate plan to establish its presence in new areas by expanding the number of teams into the newer, outer suburbs. Between 1958 and 1966, new clubs were added in Dandenong, Geelong West, Mordialloc, Sunshine, Frankston, Waverley and Werribee.
- In 1961, when the eighteenth club joined, the VFA was split into First and Second Divisions, the First Division having 10 teams, and Second Division holding the balance, with one team promoted and one team relegated between the two divisions each season. This plan was aimed at improving overall competitiveness of the competition and overcoming the huge gap between the strongest and weakest clubs which had led to unentertaining football in the late 1950s.
- In 1959, the VFA again reduced the size of the on-field team to sixteen, eliminating the two wing positions, to result in a more open field than under league rules. The VFA played 16-a-side from 1959 until 1992.
- In 1960, the VFA first began playing premiership matches on Sundays. This allowed VFA matches to be played without competing the VFL for spectators, and within a few years, clubs found that Sunday matches were as much as three to four times more lucrative than Saturday games. By the 1970s, all games were played on a Sunday, while the VFL played its games on Saturdays. This was similar to the College/Pro football day divide still present in the US. The Victorian Government supported the VFA's new-found vigour, and rejected requests by the VFL to hold its own games on Sundays until the mid-1980s.
- Finally, the VFA's importance grew significantly after signing a television broadcast deal with ATV0 (later Network Ten), which saw a weekly live broadcast (in colour, when the technology became available) of one game from 1967 until 1981, at a time when VFL matches were shown only as partial replays.

All of these changes resulted in the VFA enjoying a successful period during the 1970s. Increased sponsorship, public awareness, and a greater number of former and fringe VFL players joining the VFA gave it a product which allowed it to flourish in the Sunday timeslot. The VFA at this time comprised twenty clubs, ten in each division, with a constant membership between 1966 and 1981. Attendances at matches more than doubled between 1967 and 1975.

The VFA's relationship with the VFL and ANFC again deteriorated during the 1960s. In 1965, the VFA stopped recognising its permit reciprocity agreement in retribution for two takeovers of VFA club grounds by VFL clubs (St Kilda at Moorabbin and North Melbourne at Coburg); then in 1967, the VFL stopped recognising the agreement in retribution for the VFA's the introduction of excessive transfer fees on its players. After the VFA refused to comply with an ANFC demand that a new reciprocal permit agreement be established, the VFA was expelled from the ANFC in 1970.

==== Decline (1981–1994) ====
The decline of the VFA is often said to have commenced in 1982 when the VFL's struggling South Melbourne Swans moved to Sydney, as all Sydney Swans home games were played on Sunday and televised, ending the VFA's monopoly on Sunday football; Network Ten ended its weekly VFA coverage in the same year. However, this was not the sole cause for decline, which had started in the late 1970s: changing demographics meant that many traditional clubs had slowly found themselves in areas with high migrant populations, which either made it difficult to compete with soccer for local fans and players, or simply brought a level of cultural apathy towards the sport in general; VFA historian Marc Fiddian also noted a decline in the number of ex-VFL players signing with VFA clubs through the late 1970s, which reduced the Association's drawing power, and an increasing gulf in quality between the best and worst clubs. Player payments increased through the 1980s, and declining financial support and sponsorship meant that many clubs began to struggle badly, and often found themselves unable to compete financially with local suburban leagues. The VFA had also developed a reputation for rough play and violence, and it was not until the late 1980s that it was able to clean up on-field discipline and shake that image.

In 1981, new VFA president Alan Wickes attempted to rectify the decline with further expansion: the VFA expanded further into the outer suburbs to twenty-four teams in 1983, adding Springvale, Moorabbin, Kilsyth and Berwick, and Wickes had a vision of expanding to thirty teams with an additional lower division which could affiliate more directly with the top tiers of suburban football; but (with the exception of Springvale), the new second division teams did little to reinvigorate the competition, and the clubs rejected any further expansion.

The VFA's direction changed dramatically with the election of Brook Andersen as president in 1985. At the time, the VFL was looking at national expansion (ultimately becoming the Australian Football League in 1990) and Andersen's executive committee believed that the VFA could fill a new role as top state level league in Victoria when this happened; however, it believed that the VFA would need to be rationalised to a competition of twelve financially stable teams for this to occur. Andersen attempted but failed to obtain a mandate from the clubs to impose this rationalisation, but the VFA under his guidance nevertheless contracted, as it showed no lenience in suspending clubs who failed to meet minimum requirements. Several long-term second division clubs, struggling with rising costs and foreseeing the dissolution of the second division (which ultimately occurred when fifteen teams remained in the 1989 season), also took the opportunity to return to suburban football before being forced out. The eight-year period between 1984 and 1991 saw twelve clubs exit the VFA: Mordialloc, Kilsyth, Berwick, Geelong West and Camberwell returned to suburban football; Yarraville, Moorabbin, Northcote and Caulfield were suspended; and Sunshine, Brunswick-Broadmeadows and Waverley all folded.

The VFA rejoined the ANFC as a non-voting member in 1987, and replaced the board of club delegates with an independent executive committee in 1988, and also regained weekly television coverage from the 1988 season onwards, with the ABC broadcasting a match each Saturday. The VFA eventually returned to the standard 18-per-side rules in 1993.

=== Victorian Football League ===
==== End of the VFA (1994–1999) ====
Despite the rationalisation to its twelve strongest teams and improved television coverage, the financial position of the competition and the vast majority of its clubs remained perilous into the early 1990s, and it was clear that the VFA was no longer a viable independent body in the long term. At the end of the 1994 season, the VFA was formally disbanded in an administrative capacity, and the on-field competition was turned over to the AFL's Victorian State Football League which the AFL had set up two years earlier to take control of Australian football at all levels in Victoria and which ran the statewide under-18s competition (the present day NAB League) and the AFL reserves competition in Victoria. This ended the VFA's 97 years of independence from the VFL/AFL and, for the first time since 1896, created a single control for most Australian football in Victoria. Victorian Football Association Limited was deregistered in 2012.

The VSFL retained the use of the VFA name for the competition for the 1995 season but, in 1996, renamed the competition Victorian Football League (VFL), the name of the Australian Football League (AFL) until 1990. The VSFL sought to align the competition with the under-18s competition, with each former VFA club affiliated with an under-18s team to provide a developmental pathway from under-18 football into state-level senior football. In doing this, the number of metropolitan teams was cut from twelve to nine in 1995, with Prahran, Oakleigh and Dandenong departing. This left nine clubs with a VFA heritage, coming from different eras: Port Melbourne and Williamstown from the pre-1897 era; Preston, Coburg and Sandringham from the 1920s expansion; Box Hill, Werribee and Frankston from the 1950s/1960s expansion; and Springvale from the 1980s expansion.

The VSFL intended that each statewide under-18s team would be affiliated with a VFL club, so embarked upon a period of expansion to represent the four under-18s teams from country Victoria, as well as Tasmania (which was represented in the competition for a period of time). In this expansion, existing powerhouse country clubs North Ballarat and Traralgon joined the league in 1996, with new clubs established in Bendigo, Albury (the Murray Kangaroos, representing the Ovens & Murray region) and Tasmania between 1998 and 2001. The regional senior clubs struggled to be financially viable in the statewide competition, with Traralgon and Murray lasting only two and three years respectively. Since 2018, no regional clubs have contested the competition.

==== Merger with the AFL reserves (2000–2019) ====
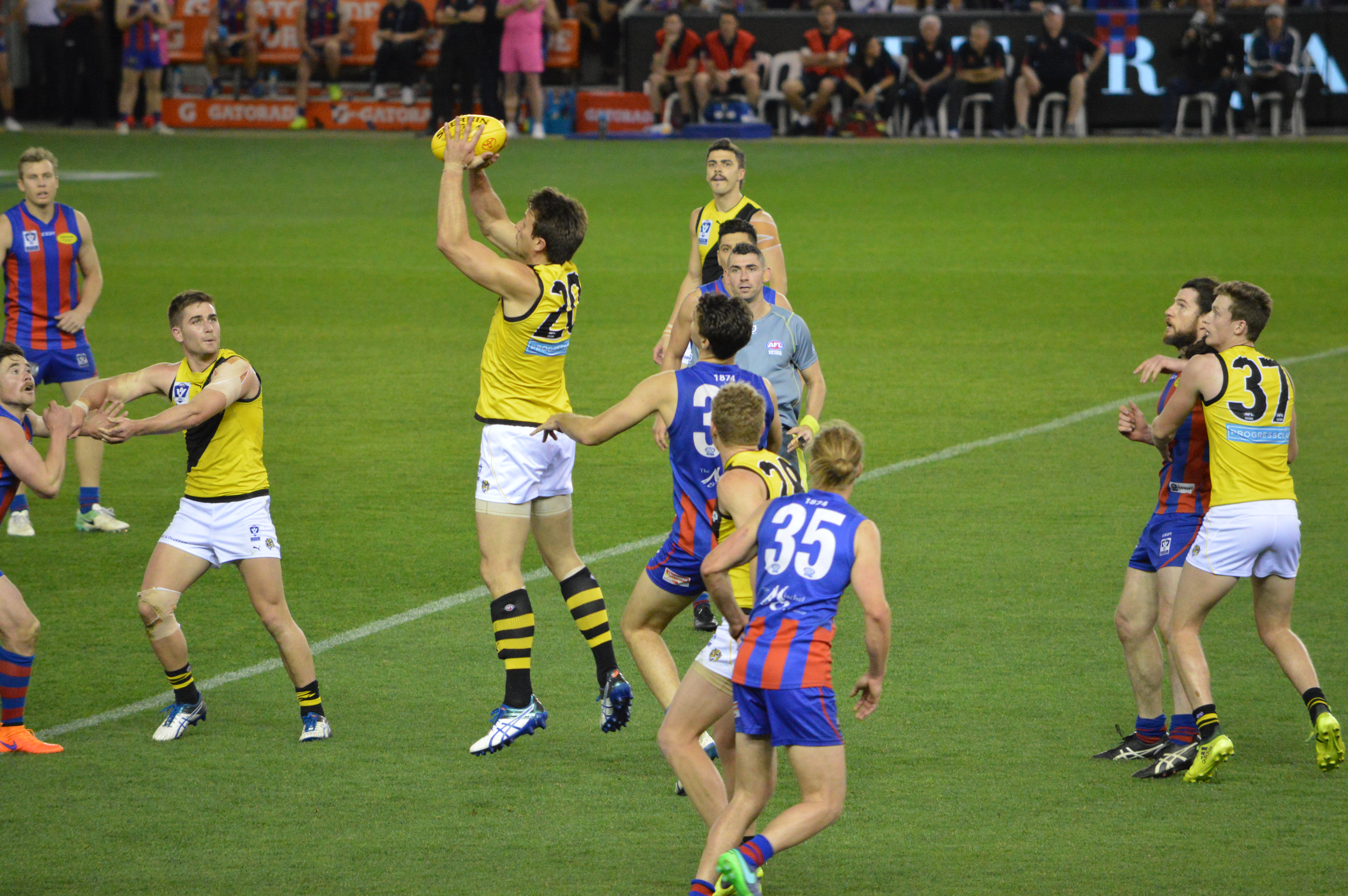
Action from the 2017 VFL Grand Final at Docklands Stadium

From 1995 until 1999, the VSFL operated its two open-age competitions – the VFA/VFL and the Victorian AFL reserves competition – separately; however, its intention had always been to merge the two, and this took place following the 1999 season, after the agreement of the AFL clubs. Under the administration's new name Football Victoria (later AFL Victoria), those two competitions were merged into a single competition still known as the Victorian Football League. Since this time, the VFL has been contested by a mixture of three types of clubs:

- VFL clubs, operating on a stand-alone basis and maintaining a complete list of players
- The reserves teams of AFL clubs, comprised on AFL reserves players and a small list of supplementary players to make up a full team
- VFL clubs operating under an affiliation arrangements with an AFL clubs, whereby players from the AFL club would join the senior team of the VFL club when not selected to play in the AFL. At times, there were rules limiting the number of AFL-listed players who could play in a VFL team, but these rules no longer exist.

All three models compete to a relatively even standard, with premierships having been won by all three types of team since the merger. An additional reserves affiliation option, under which AFL clubs were allowed to spread their reserves players across all of the league's VFL clubs rather than into a single aligned club, has also existed since 2021 but has not been taken up by any AFL clubs.

The affiliation deals greatly improved the financial viability of the clubs in question, but they diluted their ability to represent their suburb. There have been many changes to the affiliation arrangements in the decade since the VSFL took over the VFA competition, as well as a shift in the arrangement preferred by the AFL clubs. Initially, only four of the ten Victorian AFL clubs were involved in a VFL affiliation, with the rest fielding reserves teams. At its peak of between 2003 and 2006, nine of the ten Victorian AFL clubs were involved in an affiliation, with only Geelong fielding its own reserves team. Most clubs have since migrated away from this model, and since 2026 eight of the ten Victorian AFL clubs have fielded stand-alone reserves teams in the VFL. Through the 2000s, the AFL preferred that its Victorian clubs retained VFL-affiliations, and offered a disincentive in the form of an inflated licence fee for fielding a stand-alone team; however, the AFL did not otherwise prevent teams from fielding stand-alone reserves teams if they were willing and able to pay the fee. The total licence and running costs for an AFL club to field its reserves team in the VFL were estimated to be $500,000 per year in 2011.

Through this period, the VFL remained moderately popular in Victoria, although not nearly as well-supported as the dominant Australian Football League. Matches attracted both traditional fans of the VFA/VFL clubs, and fans of affiliated AFL clubs keen to watch their reserves players in action. The match of the week and most finals continued to be televised live in Melbourne by the ABC until 2014, and since 2015 by the Seven Network as a lead-in to its AFL coverage.

==== Eastern states expansion (2020–present) ====
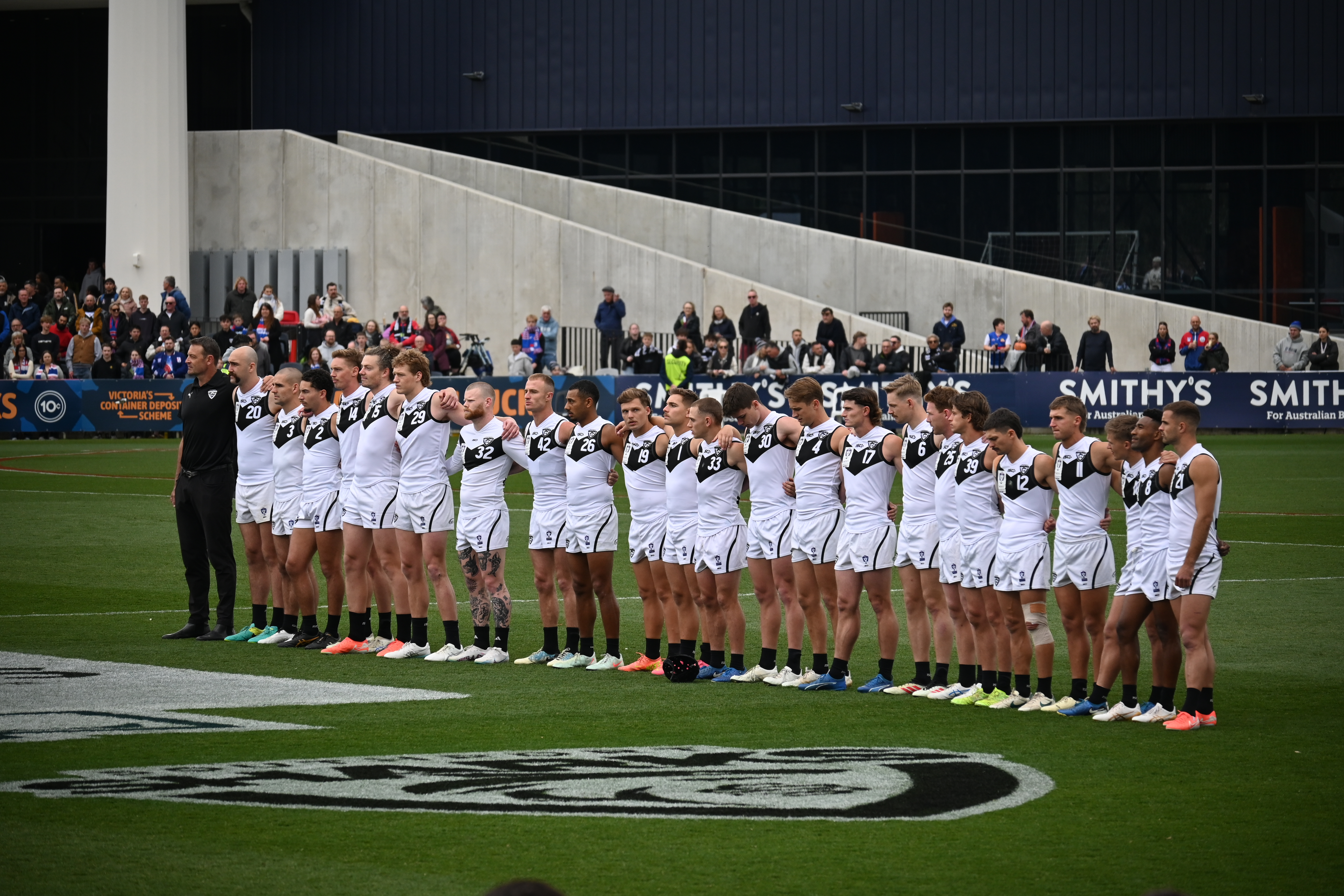
Southport players lining up ahead of the 2025 VFL Grand Final

The 2020 VFL season was cancelled as a result of the COVID-19 pandemic. Upon the VFL's resumption in 2021, the North East Australian Football League (NEAFL) – which had served as the state league in Australian Capital Territory, New South Wales, Northern Territory and Queensland – was wound up and absorbed into the VFL; this resulted in the reserves teams from the New South Wales and Queensland AFL clubs (Sydney, Greater Western Sydney, Brisbane and Gold Coast) joining the league, and two of the NEAFL's other Queensland-based senior clubs – Aspley and Southport – joining, although Aspley departed after the 2021 season. Tasmania is currently playing its first season in the VFL for 2026, as part of its pathway to the club's debut in the AFL in 2028.

The league was also revamped to improve its ability to serve as a talent pathway, with each club required to field at least six under-22 players in each game. The 2021 season also saw increased broadcast coverage with Foxtel and its streaming service Kayo showing games in addition to the ongoing deal with Seven Network.

== Clubs ==
The Victorian Football League operates on a single ladder system, with no divisions, conferences nor promotion and relegation from other leagues.

=== Current clubs ===
22 clubs are playing in the VFL in 2026.

Club	Colours	Moniker	State	Home venue	Former league	Est.	Years in VFA/VFL	Premierships		
Club	Colours	Moniker	State	Home venue	Former league	Est.	Years in VFA/VFL	Div 1	Div 2	Recent
Box Hill (A)		Hawks	VIC	Box Hill City Oval	ESFL	1936	1951–	4	2	2026
Brisbane (R)		Lions	QLD	Brighton Homes Arena	NEAFL	1998	2021–	0	–	—
Carlton (R)		Blues	VIC	Ikon Park	AFL (R)	1919	2000–2002, 2021–	0	–	—
Casey (A)		Demons	VIC	Casey Fields	FFL	1903	1982–	6	1	2022
Coburg		Lions	VIC	Barry Plant Park	VJFL	1891	1925–	6	2	1989
Collingwood (R)		Magpies	VIC	Victoria Park	AFL (R)	1919	2000, 2008–	0	–	—
Essendon (R)		Bombers	VIC	Windy Hill	AFL (R)	1919	2000–2002, 2013–	0	–	—
Footscray (R)		Bulldogs	VIC	Mission Whitten Oval	AFL (R)	1925	2014–	3	–	2025
Frankston		Dolphins	VIC	Kinetic Stadium	MPFL	1887	1966–2016, 2018–	0	1	1978
Geelong (R)		Cats	VIC	GMHBA Stadium	AFL (R)	1919	2000–	3	–	2012
Gold Coast (R)		Suns	QLD	People First Stadium	NEAFL	2011	2021–	1	–	2023
Greater Western Sydney (R)		Giants	NSW	Tom Wills Oval	NEAFL	2012	2021–	0	–	—
North Melbourne (R)		Kangaroos	VIC	Arden Street Oval	AFL (R)	1925	2018–	0	–	—
Port Melbourne		Borough	VIC	ETU Stadium	—	1874	1886–	17	–	2017
Richmond (R)		Tigers	VIC	Swinburne Centre	AFL (R)	1919	2000, 2014–	1	–	2019
Sandringham		Zebras	VIC	Trevor Barker Beach Oval	—	1929	1929–	10	–	2006
St Kilda (R)		Saints	VIC	RSEA Park	AFL (R)	1919	2000, 2026–	0	–	—
Southport		Sharks	QLD	Fankhauser Reserve	NEAFL	1961	2021–	0	–	—
Sydney (R)		Swans	NSW	Tramway Oval	NEAFL	1919	2021–	0	–	—
Tasmania		Devils	TAS	North Hobart Oval	—	2023	2026–	0	–	—
Werribee		Tigers	VIC	Avalon Airport Oval	—	1964	1965–	2	0	2024
Williamstown		Seagulls	VIC	DSV Stadium	VJFA	1864	1884–	14	2	2015
(R) Denotes that the club is the reserves team of a senior club of the Australian Football League (A) Denotes that the club is the affiliate team of a club of the Australian Football League

=== Former clubs ===
The VFA and VFL have undergone significant format changes since its induction which means several clubs have either left the league or changed identity for different reasons. Excluded from this list are provincial clubs who were full administrative members of the VFA in its first decade, but who never played enough games against other clubs to be considered relevant in the premiership.

Club	Colours	Nickname	State	Home venue	Est.	Seasons	Premierships		Current league
Club	Colours	Nickname	State	Home venue	Est.	Seasons	Div 1	Div 2	Current league
Albert Park		Parkites	VIC	Emerald Hill Cricket Ground	1867	1877–1879	0	–	Merged; 1880 with South Melbourne (now Sydney – AFL)
Aspley		Hornets	QLD	Graham Road Oval	1964	2021	0	–	QFA/QAFL
Ballarat		Swans	VIC	Ballarat City Oval	1860	1878–1896 (Administrative)	0	–	Ballarat FL
Ballarat Imperial		Imps	VIC		1876	1885–1896 (Administrative)	0	–	Folded; 1955
Bendigo	(1998–01)(2002–12)(2013–14)	Gold	VIC	Queen Elizabeth Oval	1998	1998–2014	0	–	Folded; 2014
Berwick		Gippslanders, Wickers	VIC	Arch Brown Reserve; Manuka Road Oval	1903	1983–1987	–	0	Eastern FNL
Brighton		Penguins	VIC	Brighton Beach Oval; Elsternwick Park	1881	1908–1961	1	0	Merged; 1962 with South Caulfield
Brighton-Caulfield		Penguins	VIC	Princes Park, Caulfield	1962	1962–1964	–	0	Renamed; 1965 became Caulfield
Brunswick (Brunswick–Broadmeadows)		Magpies	VIC	Gillon Oval	1865	1897–1991	3	3	Folded; 1991
Camberwell		Cobras	VIC	Camberwell Sports Ground	1896	1926–1991	0	2	Folded; 1994
Carlton (S)		Blues	VIC	Various grounds around Carlton	1864	1877–1896	2	–	AFL
Caulfield		Bears	VIC	Princes Park, Caulfield	1957	1965–1987	0	1	Folded; 1989
Collingwood (S)		Magpies	VIC	Victoria Park	1892	1892–1896	1	–	AFL
Dandenong		Dandies, Redlegs	VIC	Shepley Oval	ca. 1875	1958–1994	3	1	Folded; 1994
East Melbourne			VIC	East Melbourne; Cricket Ground	1878	1880–1882	0	–	Folded; 1882
Essendon (S)		Dons, Same Olds	VIC	East Melbourne; Cricket Ground	1871	1878–1896	4	–	AFL
Essendon (A)		Dons, Dreadnoughts	VIC	Essendon Cricket Ground	1900	1900–1921	2	–	Folded; 1921
Fitzroy (S)		Maroons	VIC	Fitzroy Cricket Ground	1883	1883–1896	1	–	Merged; 1996 with Brisbane Bears (now Brisbane Lions – AFL)
Footscray (S)		Tricolours	VIC	Western Oval, Footscray	1877	1886–1924	9	–	AFL (as Western Bulldogs)
Geelong (S)		Pivotonians	VIC	Corio Oval	1859	1877–1896	7	–	AFL
Geelong (A)			VIC	Kardinia Park; West Oval	1922	1922–1927	0	–	Folded; 1927
Geelong West		Roosters	VIC	West Oval	1878	1963–1988	1	3	Geelong FNL (as Geelong West Giants)
Gold Coast (S)		Suns	QLD	Fankhauser Reserve	2009	2010	0	–	AFL
Hawthorn (S)		Mayblooms	VIC	Glenferrie Oval	1902	1914–1924	0	–	AFL
Kilsyth		Cougars	VIC	Kilsyth Recreation Reserve	1924	1982–1984	–	0	Eastern FNL
Melbourne (S)		Redlegs, Fuchsias	VIC	Melbourne Cricket Ground	1858	1877–1896	0	–	AFL
Melbourne City			VIC	East Melbourne Cricket Ground	1912	1912–1913	0	–	Folded; 1913
Moorabbin (I)		Kangaroos	VIC	Moorabbin Oval	1909	1951–1963	2	–	Folded; 1964
Moorabbin (II)		Kangas	VIC	Moorabbin Oval; Bentleigh Recreation Reserve	1979	1983–1987	–	0	Folded; 1987
Mordialloc		Bloodhounds	VIC	Ben Kavanagh Reserve	1891	1958–1988	0	1	Southern FNL
Murray		Kangaroos	VIC; NSW	Coburg City Oval; Lavington Sports Ground	2000	2000–2002	0	–	Folded; 2002
North Ballarat		Roosters	VIC	Eureka Stadium	1882	1996–2017	3	–	Ballarat FL
North Melbourne (S) (Hotham)		Northerners, Shinboners	VIC	North Melbourne Cricket Ground	1869	1877–1924	6	–	AFL
Northcote		Dragons	VIC	Northcote Park	1870s	1908–1987	5	2	Folded; 1987
Oakleigh		Oaks, Devils	VIC	Warrawee Park	1891	1929–1994	6	2	Folded; 1994
Prahran (I)			VIC	Albert Cricket Ground; Wesley College Ground	1886	1886–1887	0	–	Merged; 1888 with St Kilda
Prahran (II)		Two Blues	VIC	Toorak Park	1899	1899–1994 (excl. 1959)	5	2	VAFA
Preston		Bullants	VIC	Preston City Oval	1882	1903–1911; 1926–2025	4	2	Stripped of VFL licence following 2025 season
Richmond (S)		Tigers	VIC	Richmond Cricket Ground	1885	1885–1907	2	–	AFL
South Ballarat (Albion Imperial)			VIC		c. 1877	1883–1896 (Administrative)	0	–	Folded; 1941
South Melbourne (S)		Southerners	VIC	South Melbourne Cricket Ground	1874	1879–1896	5	–	AFL (as Sydney)
South Williamstown			VIC	Williamstown; Cricket Ground	1886	1886–1887	0	–	Merged; 1888 with Williamstown
St Kilda (S)		Saints	VIC	St Kilda Cricket Ground	1873	1877–1879; 1886–1896	0	–	AFL
Sunshine		Crows	VIC	Selwyn Park; Skinner Reserve	1938	1959–1989	0	1	Folded; 1990
Tasmania		Devils	TAS	Bellerive Oval; North Hobart Oval; York Park	2001	2001–2008	0	–	Folded; 2008
Traralgon		Maroons	VIC	Traralgon Reserve	1883	1996–1997	0	–	Gippsland League
University		Students	VIC	University Oval	1885	1885–1888	0	–	VAFA
Waverley		Panthers	VIC	Central Reserve	1908	1961–1987	1	0	Merged; 1998 with Mount Waverley Burwood (now Waverley Blues − EFNL)
West Melbourne		Wests	VIC	North Melbourne Cricket Ground	1874	1878–1880; 1899–1907	1	–	Folded; 1908
Yarraville	(1928–29)(1930–76)(1977–83)	Eagles	VIC	Yarraville Oval	1903	1928–1983	2	0	Folded; 1984
(S) denotes that the club joined the VFL/AFL later leaving the VFA/VFL (R) denotes that the club is/was the reserves team of the/a senior AFL club

=== Map ===
2026 VFL clubs from Victoria
2026 VFL clubs from other Eastern States

=== Uniforms (current clubs) ===
Box Hill	Brisbane	Carlton	Casey	Coburg
Collingwood	Essendon	Footscray	Frankston	Geelong
Gold Coast	Greater Western Sydney	North Melbourne	Port Melbourne	Richmond
Sandringham	Southport	St Kilda	Sydney	Tasmania
Werribee	Williamstown

== Awards ==
=== Best and fairest ===
The first award for the Association best and fairest player was the Woodham Cup, first awarded in 1923; this was renamed the Recorder Cup in 1926. Starting from 1933, a second award, the V.F.A. Medal, was awarded concurrently; the awards were both based on the votes of the umpires, but were based on different voting systems. In 1940, the Association dispensed with the Recorder Cup voting system, and awarded both trophies to the same player based on the same set of votes.

Since 1945, the award for the best and fairest player in each VFA/VFL season has been the J. J. Liston Trophy, named after long-term Association president John James Liston, who died in 1944.

=== Other awards ===
- The Jim 'Frosty' Miller Medal is awarded annually to the leading goal-kicker in the VFL home-and-away season; it was struck in 1999 and named after Jim 'Frosty' Miller, who kicked 885 goals for Dandenong between 1966 and 1974.
- The Norm Goss Memorial Medal, awarded annually to the player voted best afield in the VFL grand final; it was struck in 1983 in honour of Norm Goss, Sr., a senior administrator in both the VFA and the Port Melbourne Football Club.
- The Fothergill–Round–Mitchell Medal, awarded annually to the most promising young talent in the VFL competition; it was struck in 1989 and is named after the three players who have won a Brownlow Medals in the VFL/AFL and won a Recorder Cup/Liston Trophy in the VFL: Des Fothergill and Barry Round, after whom the award was originally named, and Sam Mitchell, whose name was added to the award in 2018.
- The Frank Johnson Medal, awarded to the player voted best afield for the VFL in interstate football games; named after Frank Johnson, the only VFA player ever selected as captain of an All-Australian Team.

=== VFL Club Championship ===
The VFL Club Championship was a club championship trophy, awarded each year to the team with the best aggregate performance across the VFL's senior and reserves competitions during the home-and-away season. From 2007, the winner of the trophy was awarded the Gary Gilchrist Cup, named after former Sandringham president Gary Gilchrist.

As of 2007, the Club Championship was decided by a points system during the home-and-away season, with eight points given for a victory in the seniors and four points given for a win in the reserves.

==== List of known winners ====
Year	Winner	Points	Ref
2001	Werribee		
2003	Port Melbourne		
2006	Northern Bullants		
2007	Coburg	164	
2008	Williamstown		
2011	Port Melbourne		

== Salary cap ==
The VFL is classed as a semi-professional competition. In 2007 the league had a salary cap of $185,000, excluding service payments. There are a significantly higher number of AFL reserves due to affiliations with Victorian clubs, but player payments for these appearances is apparently not included in the VFL's salary cap. Following the 2013 VFL season, it was revealed that several clubs were lobbying VFL executives to increase the salary cap in a bid to keep high-level players who had relieved themselves of participating in the league to accept more attractive financial offers in local football competitions, where such caps are far less regulated.

As of the 2022 season, standalone clubs in the league, of which there are eight, have a A$220,000 salary cap, while the AFL reserve and affiliate clubs have a A$110,000 salary cap.

== Attendance ==
Attendances are small by AFL standards, and generally less than the SANFL and WAFL, with an average of between 500 and 1,000 in attendance. Crowds for many finals matches tend to average in the 2,000–6,000 range, with the Grand Final typically attracting a crowd in the 10,000–14,000 mark.

The VFL does not publish home-and-away attendance figures, as some games are played as AFL curtain raisers; however, various sources quote attendances for some games of the stronger clubs that maintain home records of their own.

== Media coverage ==
=== Television ===
Television coverage has been critical to the exposure of the VFA/VFL during its history, and has typically taken the form of the match of the week being televised live into Melbourne, as well as most finals. Television and streaming deals during the league's history are as follows:

- 1967–1981: Weekly broadcasts of Sunday's match of the round on Channel 0/Channel 10
- 1982–1983: Only the Division 1 grand final was broadcast. Ten had been keen for the televised game to be played at the same venue each week; the VFA arranged for Junction Oval to be available, but Ten worried that the small crowds would give a poor atmosphere in such a large venue.
- 1984–1986: Match of the round in the final two rounds, plus finals on Channel 10
- 1987: VFA finals only on Channel 2 (ABC) in Victoria
- 1988–2014: Weekly broadcasts of match of the round on Saturday afternoons, along with most (or all) finals. Commentators included Ross Booth and Phil Cleary.
- 2000: in addition to ABC's coverage, one Monday night match televised each week on the Seven Network's C7 Sport subscription channel. At this time, pay TV penetration was low, and this lasted only one year.
- 2015–2019: weekly broadcasts of match of the round on Saturday afternoons, plus most finals, on Channel 7
- 2021: up to three matches per round available on sports streaming service Kayo Sports, one Sunday "match of the round" game broadcast on Seven, and one Thursday night game broadcast on Fox Footy (only when no AFL Thursday night fixture is scheduled).
- 2022–2025: one match per round broadcast live on Seven Network and available live and on-demand nationally on 7plus streaming site, and all additional matches broadcast online through the AFL's website and app.
- 2026: One match per round (and the grand final) on the ABC, at least one match per round available on Kayo Sports, Tasmania Football Club home matches on Seven, and all matches broadcast online through the AFL's website and app.

The VFA holds the distinction of having the first match to be broadcast live on television in Australia, when the second half of the match between Oakleigh and Preston on 25 May 1957 was televised on Channel 2 (ABC).

=== Radio ===
The first regular radio broadcasts of VFA games were made by 3XY, shortly after the station commenced operations in 1935. The commentator was former Geelong VFL player Wallace "Jumbo" Sharland who had earlier been the first to describe VFL matches, that being on 3AR in 1923. In 1954 3AK began broadcasting VFA games, albeit only for a season or two. The 1970s also saw broadcasts on 3UZ, and local Geelong station, 3GL, broadcast all Geelong West matches. In 1982, the then-dominant Melbourne sports radio station, 3AW, broadcast the Grand Final.

In 2003, 3AK evolved into sports radio station SEN 1116, and provided a coverage of VFL matches, but this was discontinued after they won the rights to broadcast the AFL (Australian Football League) from the 2007 season. From 1993 onwards radio's main home for the competition was on Casey Radio 3SER where the team, headed up by Ken Moore, did a terrific job bringing games to the wider public. The station gave a start to such broadcasters as Nigel Carmody, Darren Parkin and Tristan Foenander and has proven a terrific breeding ground for emerging sports broadcasters. The station still broadcasts the league today, combined with doing the local league down in Melbourne's southeast.

VFL Radio is produced by BPM Media who broadcast live at least one game a week during the regular season plus each day of the finals series. The coverage is broadcast on the Vision Australia Radio network throughout Victoria on analogue radio, by Aussie digital radio (SEN 2) and on the internet at vfl.com.au or bpmmedia.com.au.

=== List of broadcasters since 2000 ===
All free-to-air broadcasts are only available in Victoria (unless otherwise noted).

Seasons	Free-to-air	Pay-TV	Streaming (paid) (Note: Streaming services which are separate to the ones offered by free-to-air broadcasters.)	Streaming (free)
2000	ABC	C7 Sport	—N/a	—N/a
2001–2014	ABC	—N/a	—N/a	—N/a
2015–2017	Seven	—N/a	—N/a	—N/a
2018–2020	Seven	—N/a	—N/a	AFL Victoria (YouTube)
2021	Seven	Fox Footy	Kayo Sports	AFL.com.au
2022–2025	Seven	—N/a	—N/a	AFL.com.au
2026	ABC	Fox Footy	Kayo Sports	AFL.com.au
2026	Seven (Tasmania)	Fox Footy	Kayo Sports	AFL.com.au

== VFA presidents ==
The following men served as president of the VFA between its establishment in 1877 and its becoming defunct in 1994.

No.	President	Club	Tenure
1	William Clarke, MLC	Melbourne	1877–1881
2	Cr James Garton		1882–1886
3	Frank Grey Smith	Melbourne	1887–1896
4	Theodore Fink, MLA	Richmond	1897–1900
5	James Hall	Williamstown	1901–1902
6	Cr John George Aikman	Essendon (A.)	1903–1928
7	Cr John James Liston	Williamstown	1929–1944
8	Henry Zwar, MLA	Preston	1944–1946
9	Squire Reid, MLA	Oakleigh	1947–1949
10	Dr Frank Hartnett	Camberwell	1949–1950
11	Lewis Page	Brighton	1951–1953
12	Cr Alex Gillon	Brunswick	1954–1980
13	Alan Wickes	Frankston	1981–1984
14	Brook Andersen	Brunswick	1985–1989
15	John Grieve	Williamstown	1989–1992
16	Tony Hannebery	Williamstown	1993–1994

== VFL Women's ==
From the 2016 season, a statewide women's football league aligned with the VFL was established by AFL Victoria. The competition initially comprised the six Premier Division clubs and the top four Division 1 clubs from the now-defunct Victorian Women's Football League (VWFL), and was aligned and co-branded with the VFL to improve market penetration. Following the 2017 season, the competition was reconfigured to affiliate teams more closely with AFL clubs. In 2018, the league comprised thirteen teams; twelve were based in Victoria and nine were affiliated with AFL clubs, with one in the Northern Territory. The league ran from May to September, running concurrently with the VFL.

== Former grades ==
=== Seconds/reserves ===
The VFA/VFL operated a seconds or reserves competition from the 1920s, initially emerging from the Victorian Junior Football Association. From its inception until 1979, the seconds team played on Saturday afternoons, playing at home when the senior team played away and vice versa. Since 1980, seconds matches have been played as curtain-raisers to senior matches, on Saturdays or Sundays as necessary. The competition was later renamed the reserves, and then from the beginning of the 2012 season it has been known as the AFL Victoria Development League, a move that coincided with the introduction of the AFL Victoria Development Academy which provides development opportunities for up to 25 selected VFL players per year. For most of the VFA's history, fielding a team in the seconds grade was mandatory for all senior teams, but in the state league era many regional clubs – as well as all AFL clubs fielding their reserves teams in the VFL seniors – opted not to contest the minor grade. The Development League was abolished after the 2017 season with all VFL clubs' reserve players now play suburban football when not playing with the VFL seniors.

=== Thirds/Under-19s ===
The VFA operated an under-19s competition, initially known as the Thirds, between 1952 and 1994. The Under-19s was disbanded when the AFL's VSFL took over the VFA competition after the 1994, with the statewide under-19s competition (the present day NAB League) replacing its function as an under-18s competition.

== See also ==
- List of VFA/VFL premiers
- List of VFA/VFL records
- History of Australian rules football in Victoria (1859–1900)
