= David Mensch =

Australian rules footballer

Personal information
- Born: 14 August 1972 (age 54)
- Original team: Grovedale (GFL)
- Height: 191 cm (6 ft 3 in)
- Weight: 93 kg (205 lb)

Playing career^{1}
Years	Club	Games (Goals)
1992–2002	Geelong	158 (173)
- ^{1} Playing statistics correct to the end of 2002.

Career highlights
- Geelong leading goalkicker: 2000; VFL premiership player: 2002

David Mensch (born 14 August 1972) is a former Australian rules footballer who played with Geelong in the Australian Football League.

Mensch was a half forward and played in two losing grand final teams. He was the joint leading goal kicker for Geelong in 2000 with 39 goals

After finishing his AFL career, Mensch played with Mansfield in the Goulburn Valley Football League (GVFL) where he was a star player in their premiership side. He returned to coach Grovedale in the Geelong Football League and then played for Anglesea in the Bellarine Football League.

Mensch finished his football career in 2014 as playing coach of Winchelsea in the Geelong & District Football League, having joined the club in the 2012 off-season after finishing up at Anglesea. Two days after his 42nd birthday, Mensch booted eight goals for a best-on-ground performance in the final round of the 2014 GDFL regular season, before his side was bundled out by East Geelong in the elimination final the following week.
