= North Ballarat Football Club =

Australian rules football and netball club

Names
- Full name: North Ballarat Football & Netball Club
- Nickname: Roosters
- Motto: Vires Acquirit Eundo (We gather strength as we go)

Club details
- Founded: 1882; 144 years ago
- Colours: Black White
- Competition: Ballarat Football League
- Chairperson: Terry Hay
- CEO: Patrick Thornton
- Coach: Clint Proctor
- Captain(s): Simon McCartin & Elliott Lamb
- Grounds: Mars Stadium (capacity: 15,000)
- North Ballarat Number 2 Oval (capacity: 4,000)

Uniforms
Home

Other information
- Official website: northcity.com.au

The North Ballarat Football Club, nicknamed the Roosters, is an Australian rules football and netball club based at Mars Stadium in Ballarat.

The club was founded in 1882 and has competed in the Ballarat Football Netball League (BFNL), and previously competed in the Victorian Football League (VFL) between 1996 and 2017. It is considered one of the strongest clubs in regional Victoria.

== History ==
The club was established in 1882, playing in a number of regional competitions before entering Ballarat's "B" grade league as 'North City Football Club' in 1946 where it won its first premiership. In 1952 the club was admitted to the Ballarat Football League (BFL) as 'Ballarat North City' making its first Grand Final appearance in 1959. In 1960 the club played as 'North City – Wendouree' and was renamed 'North Ballarat Football Club' in 1961. The club won its first BFL Premiership (by two points) on its second Grand Final appearance in 1963 against Ballarat Football Club. The 1970s heralded the start of a golden era for the club. In the 27-year period from 1970 until 1996 the club claimed a further 14 BFL Premierships in the period spanning the 1970–1995 seasons (of which they claimed five between 1990–95). The latter feat was no doubt what prompted an invitation to join the re-constructed Victorian Football League (VFL) for the 1996 season.

The team had two unsuccessful VFL Grand Final attempts in 1999 and 2000, and won the 2008 VFL Premiership defeating the Port Melbourne Football Club. In 2009 and 2010 they gained back-to-back Premierships defeating the Northern Bullants at Etihad Stadium in Melbourne on both occasions.

The VFL competition has changed significantly since 1996 with ten of the fourteen teams in the present day VFL competition being aligned to (or the full Reserve listed teams of) much larger AFL clubs. The North Ballarat Roosters separated their association with the North Melbourne Football Club at the end of the 2015 season and struggled to transition as a stand-alone team against the AFL backed teams. At the end of the 2017 season, AFL Victoria revoked North Ballarat's VFL licence due to difficulties in the club's governance and on-field performance, citing difficulties at board level and the club's divided attention between its VFL team and its North Ballarat City BFL team, ending the club's stint in the VFL after 22 seasons.

Throughout its history the club has maintained a junior development program, producing sportsmen of the calibre of Brownlow Medallist Tony Lockett, Collingwood and past West Coast Eagles dual AFL premiership coach Michael Malthouse and Olympic marathon runner Steve Moneghetti. There are also many players past and present who have played Australian football at its highest level.

== Home ground ==
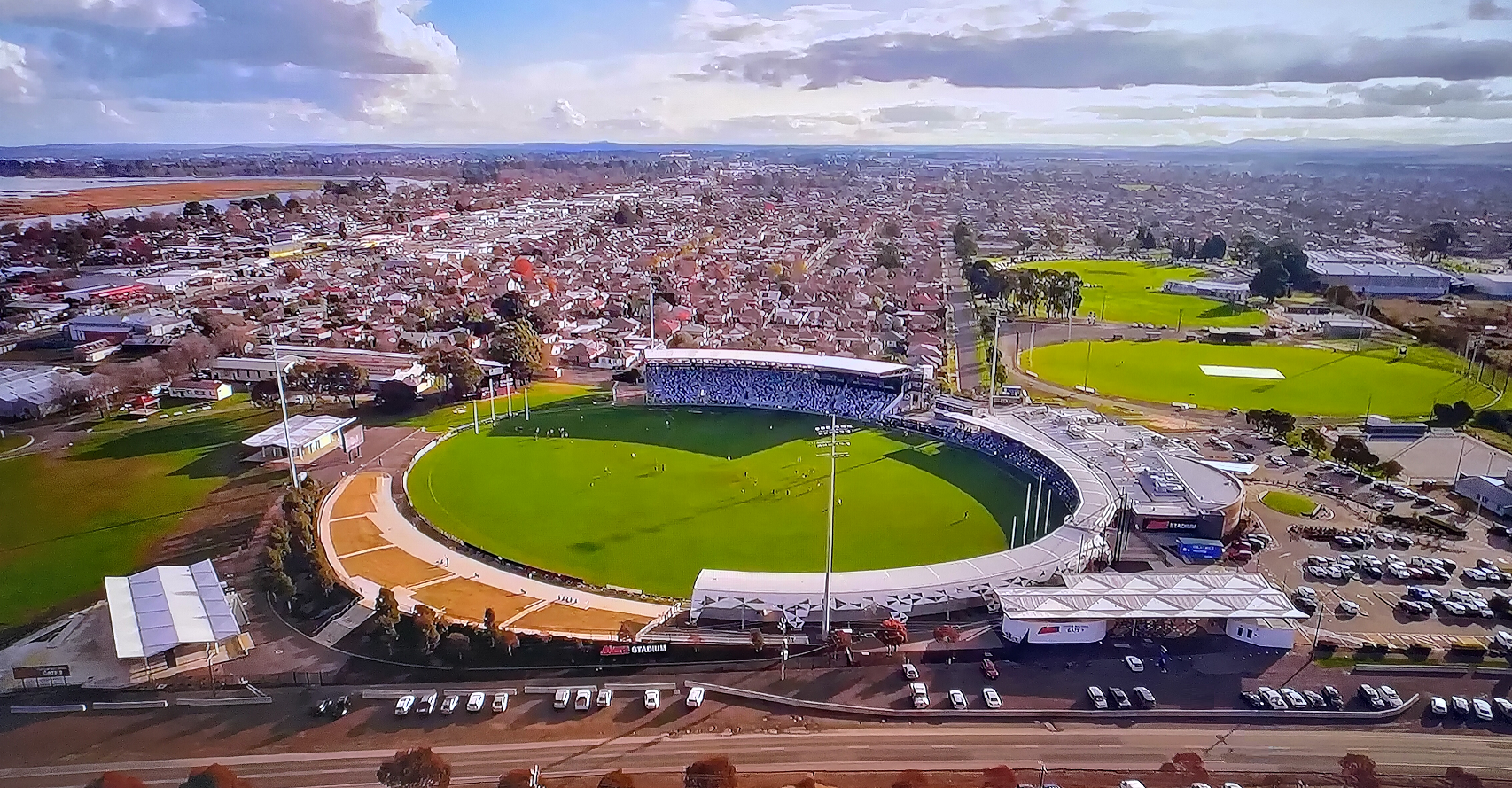
Eureka (Mars) Stadium is the home of the North Ballarat Sports Clubs

North Ballarat has historically played on ovals contained within the Ballarat Council owned Ballarat Showgrounds precinct. Between 1952 and 1990 the main playing oval was contained within the showgrounds harness-racing and show arena with the clubrooms located in surplus 'P' huts recycled from the former WW2 Ballarat RAAF Base. The original Showgrounds oval was noted for its muddy surface and blustery winds making it an extremely unpopular venue for opposing teams and spectators alike. By 1990 the club had accumulated substantial revenues to fund construction of a new social club and entertainment complex that coincided with the construction of a new all-weather oval on the site of the former harness-racing arena. While the new oval was built on Crown Land, the new clubrooms were established on adjacent freehold title land to the North. The new oval and clubhouse complex was unimaginatively named 'Northern Oval Number 1' with a secondary training oval (Northern Oval Number 2 or Frank Bourke Oval) established nearby. Between 1990 and 2015 the No 1 oval and social club were subsequently expanded and developed in line with the club's inclusion into the VFL. In 2009 the ground adopted the name Eureka Stadium and by that time had capacity for several thousand around its perimeter with limited seating to the front of the social club.

Between September 2015 to July 2017 both ovals were completely re-built with new grandstands, lighting and video scoreboard established at the Mars Stadium site. In August 2018 the Ballarat Council purchased the North Ballarat Social Club and carparks in order to centralise management of the redeveloped stadium and social club as one entity, with the Club entering into a long term leasing agreement as the primary tenant.

== AFL links ==
Between 2006 and 2015, North Ballarat was in a partial reserves affiliation with the AFL's North Melbourne Football Club. Under the arrangement, half of the players not selected in the North Melbourne senior team were allocated to play with North Ballarat; the other half played with Tasmania between 2006 and 2007, and with Werribee between 2008 and 2015. The arrangement ended after the 2015 season leaving North Ballarat as a stand-alone and sole regional VFL team.

The club was also previously linked to the North Ballarat Rebels (now Greater Western Victoria Rebels) under-18s side that competes in the TAC Cup.

== Club song ==
Current Senior Song:

Cheers boys cheers we are the Northies,

It's only now we're coming into form, into form

We will cover them in mud and we'll cover them in blood

If they only play a fair and honest game

We're the same old North that we used to be

We're the same old North we will always be

You can take my tip we will win the premiership

For the good old black and white

== North Ballarat City ==
A consequence of having joined the VFL was that the club's juniors no longer had a local-level senior representative team in the BFL; this forced junior players to move to other senior BFL clubs (once they were of mature age) and impacted the North Ballarat Club with players losing long built connections with the club. To overcome this, the club established a new local BFL senior representative team under the club's original name "North Ballarat City" in 2006. The club initially applied to enter the new team into the Ballarat Football League, however the remaining BFL clubs vetoed the proposal forcing North Ballarat City to initially join the Bendigo Football League. In their first year in the Bendigo competition they were winless but improved to win five games in 2007.

In 2008, the BFL admitted North Ballarat City to its senior competition. Between 2008-2010 the team won four games each season but improved significantly in 2011 advancing through to the Preliminary Final before being knocked out. North Ballarat City won their first BFL premiership in 2013, defeating Sunbury. The North Ballarat City Under 18.5 team also won a premiership in 2013, defeating Melton South. The following year the senior team won the 2014 BFL Grand Final defeating Ballarat Football Club at Ballarat's Eastern Oval.

In 2019 North Ballarat City has been rebranded to the North Ballarat Football Netball Club and readopted the original Rooster logo.

== Female Football ==
North Ballarat also have Under 13, Under 15 and Under 18 female teams that compete in the AFL Goldfields Women's Football League.

== Netball ==
North Ballarat field teams in the Under 9, Under 11, Under 13, Under 15, Under 17, E, D, C, B and A Grade competitions. North Ballarat won both the 2022 and 2023 A Grade netball premierships.

== Records ==
Premierships
| Competition | Level | Wins | Years won |
| Ballarat Football League | Seniors | 18 | 1946, 1963, 1970, 1973, 1978, 1979, 1982, 1983, 1984, 1985, 1986, 1991, 1992, 1994, 1995, 1996, 2013, 2014 |
| Ballarat Football League | Reserves | 11 | 1971, 1987, 1989, 1990, 1991, 1992, 1993, 1994, 1995, 1996, 2011 |
| Ballarat Football League | Under-18s | 15 | 1963, 1970, 1972, 1973, 1974, 1975, 1982, 1983, 1990, 1994, 1995, 2012, 2013, 2014, 2018 |
| Victorian Football League | Seniors | 3 | 2008, 2009, 2010 |
| Victorian Football League | Reserves | 2 | 1999, 2000 |

== Bibliography ==
- Stoward, J. History of Football in the Ballarat District ISBN 978-0-9805929-0-0
