= Lavington Sports Ground =

Mixed-use venue in Albury, Australia

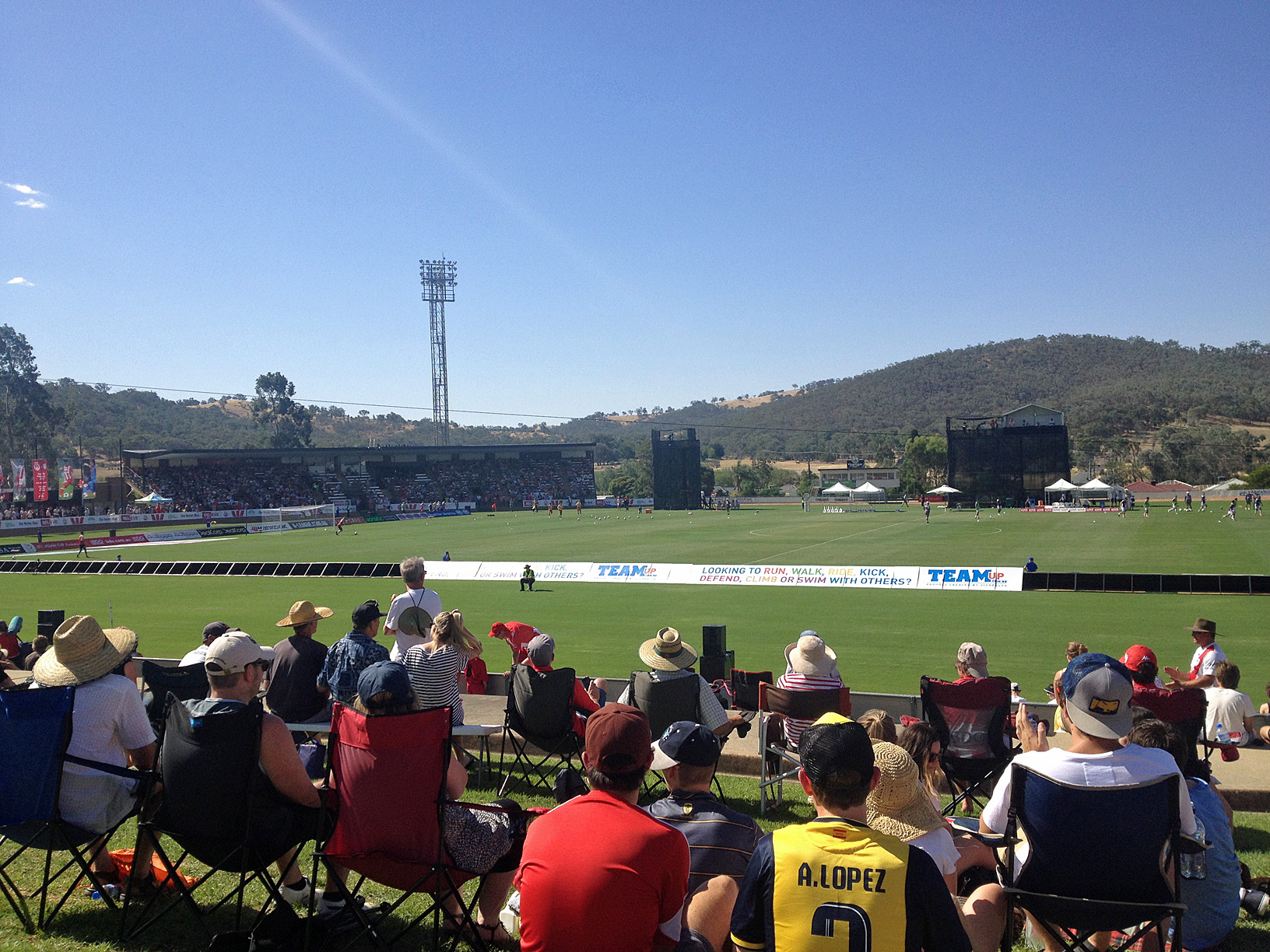
- The pitch before an A-League match in 2014
- Interactive map of Lavington Sports Ground
- Former names: Lavington Panthers Oval (2001–2009)
- Location: Hamilton Valley, Albury, New South Wales, Australia
- Coordinates: 36°2′6″S 146°54′47″E
- Owner: City of Albury
- Capacity: 12,000; Seating: 1,500 (13% capacity)
- Surface: Grass (Oval)
- Record attendance: 20,169 (20 March 1995: AFL Pre-Season: Essendon vs. Carlton)

Construction
- Opened: 1970s
- Renovated: 2016 (2019 plan completion)

Tenants
- Lavington Panthers F.N.C. (OMFNL); Lavington Panthers C.C. (CAW); Murray Kangaroos (VFL) (2000-2002); Melbourne Heart (A-League Men) (2014); Manly Sea Eagles (NRL) (2015); Sydney Thunder (BBL) (2022); Melbourne Stars (BBL) (2023); Murray United FC (NPL Victoria) (2016); Murray Bushrangers (NAB League/Talent League) (2019, 2022-2023 2025-present)

Ground information
- Country: Australia
- End names
- "North End" "South End" / "Hill End"

International information
- Only men's ODI: 18 March 1992: Zimbabwe v England

The Lavington Sports Ground (LSG), known as Lavington Panthers Oval between 2001 and 2009, is a sports ground located in the suburb of Hamilton Valley near Lavington on the north-west fringe of the city of Albury, Australia. The oval is nestled in the side of a hill, with concrete terraces cut into the southern side of the oval below a grass embankment and the grandstand and changing rooms located on the north-west flank. The venue also incorporates a 4 table cricket wicket, a velodrome for track cycling and two netball courts. The Lavington Panthers Sports Club licensed club was formerly located next to the ground, across Hanna Street.

The venue is the home ground for the Lavington Panthers Football Club in the Ovens & Murray Football League, and usually hosts the Ovens & Murray grand finals, which typically attract crowds of 10 thousand to 15 thousand. During the summer months, the venue is used for cricket, with a turf wicket, and in this capacity serves as the home ground of the Lavington Panthers side in the Cricket Albury-Wodonga Provincial competition.

== History ==
- In December 1972, construction started on the current grandstand.
- 1981 saw the ground host the Grand Final of the Ovens & Murray Football League for the first time. Wodonga triumphed over Albury, 19.11 (125) to 14.14 (98), in front of 10,150.
- Ever since 1995, every Grand Final of the Ovens & Murray Football League has been hosted at Lavington Sports Ground. Normally the Preliminary Final is hosted by one of the O&M's other big venues, either the Albury Sports Ground or Norm Minns Oval in Wangaratta.
- In 2001 the facility became under control of the Penrith Panthers through the Penrith Entertainment Group.
- In July 2009 the facility was sold to the Albury City Council for $1.2M.
- In 2010, Albury City Council completed a lighting upgrade costing in the order of $500K to bring the lux level to television broadcast standards.
- In September 2010, Lavington Sports Ground hosted the Group Nine Rugby League Grand Final for the first time.
- In 2016 Albury City Council announced plans for extensive refurbishments.

=== 2016–17 Redevelopment ===
Albury City purchased the Lavington Sports Ground from the Panthers Group in 2009. Since then, a number of improvements have been made to the facility and the council has also purchased an additional 4.6 hectares of land to the east for the development of additional multipurpose playing fields.

In December 2015, the council was successful in securing $4.025M under the Federal Government's National Stronger Region Fund for the redevelopment project to add to funding of $3.5M from Albury City Council and $250,000 from the AFL, and commitments from the Lavington Panthers Football/Netball and Cricket clubs, design of the project is near completion and works will commence in late 2017.

== International & national usage ==
=== Australian rules football ===
From the early 1990s until 2006, Lavington often hosted AFL practice matches during the pre-season, however due to the inadequacy of the ground lighting, from 2006 the AFL began prioritise pre-season fixtures elsewhere in the Riverina area at Narrandera and Wagga Wagga, and the North East Victoria area at Wangaratta and Shepparton. After the lighting upgrade, AFL once again began scheduling pre-season matches at the Lavington Sports Ground, with the first being between Richmond and Port Adelaide in 2015.

AFL pre-season matches at Lavington Sports Ground
- 2005 – Wizard Regional Challenge: Friday 4 March, (Night) – Crowd 12,157.

Clubs	Goals	Behinds	Points
Melbourne	14	9	(93)
St. Kilda	12	11	(83)

- 2006 – Wizard Regional Challenge: Friday 17 March, (Night) – Crowd 5151.

Clubs	Goals	Behinds	Points
Carlton	11	13	(79)
Western Bulldogs	10	16	(76)

- 2015 – NAB Challenge: Saturday 14 March, 4:40 pm – Crowd 8451.

Clubs	Super Goals	Goals	Behinds	Points
Richmond	1	14	10	(103)
Port Adelaide	0	5	7	(37)

From 2000 until 2002, the Murray Kangaroos played in the VFL as a joint venture between the AFL's North Melbourne Football Club and the Ovens and Murray Football League and served as North Melbourne's reserve side. The club's home games were split between Lavington and Coburg City Oval in Melbourne. The side was composed of players from the Kangaroos, topped up with players from the Ovens and Murray League which offered a second chance to local footballers who had missed out on the AFL Draft.

In 1990, the venue also hosted a warm-up match for the 1990 International Rules Series between Australia and Ireland, in which Australia 2.9.17 (56) defeated Ireland 2.6.11 (41)

=== Cricket ===
Kerry Packer brought his World Series Cricket to Lavington for the Country Cup during the 1977/78 & 1978/79 seasons.

The venue hosted a Sheffield Shield fixture between New South Wales and Victoria during the 1989/90 domestic season.

In 1990 New South Wales hosted England in a tour match at the venue.

During the 1992 Cricket World Cup, the ground hosted the match between England and Zimbabwe. Zimbabwe won in a shock result, due in part to their fast bowler Eddo Brandes demolishing the English top order, enabling Zimbabwe to defend their own low innings total.

On 13 December 2016, the venue hosted 3 exhibition cricket matches between Big Bash League teams. This included one match from the 2016–17 Women's Big Bash League followed by two practice matches for men ahead of their Big Bash competition that began later in the month.

On 31 December 2022, the Big Bash League returned to the ground for a full competition men's match between Sydney Thunder and Hobart Hurricanes which saw the Thunder post a considerable innings total of 6/228 then successfully defending their total, dismissing the Hurricanes all out for 166. The attendance for the game was 10,171.

=== Rugby league ===
Lavington hosted the grand final of the then-NSWRL/ARL's pre-season competition, the Tooheys Challenge Cup 1994 and 1995. The South Sydney Rabbitohs won their first major trophy since their 1971 premiership win when they shocked two-time reigning premiers the Brisbane Broncos 27–26 in the Tooheys Challenge Cup final. In 1995 the Broncos went one better and won the Cup with a 30–14 win over Cronulla-Sutherland.

The New South Wales Rugby League had scheduled the City vs Country representative game for Lavington in 2007 but the fixture was shifted to Coffs Harbour, as the existing lighting was deemed unsuitable for television. The venue did however host the City vs Country game in 2011 with Country defeating City 18–12 in front of 8,056 fans.

In February 2015, the NRL announced that the Manly-Warringah Sea Eagles would play at Lavington against the Canberra Raiders in round 5. The match, which took place during Round 5 of the 2015 NRL season saw the Raiders defeat an out-of-form Manly 29–16 in front of 6,436 fans.

=== Soccer ===
In September 2013, The A-League soccer club Melbourne Heart confirmed that they would play their Round 18 fixture of the 2013–14 season against Perth Glory at the stadium.

On 9 February 2014, Heart triumphed 2–1 in scorching conditions. Due to the high temperature of 41 °C, the start of the match was postponed by two hours from 3pm to 5pm, however there remained no significant drop in temperature in that time. Players were ordered off the field on three occasions (15', 30', 66') for drinks breaks. 7218 were in attendance.

In May 2016, the local NPL Victoria side Murray United was drawn to host fellow Victorian side Bentleigh Greens in the Sixth Round Preliminary of the 2016 FFA Cup. (Murray United's usual home ground is at La Trobe University in Wodonga.) On 25 May 2016, at Lavington Sports Ground, Murray United lost 0–3 in a gutsy effort to the NPL Vic Powerhouse club.

== See also ==
- Ovens & Murray Football League
- Albury Sports Ground
