= Coburg City Oval =

Sports venue in Coburg, Victoria

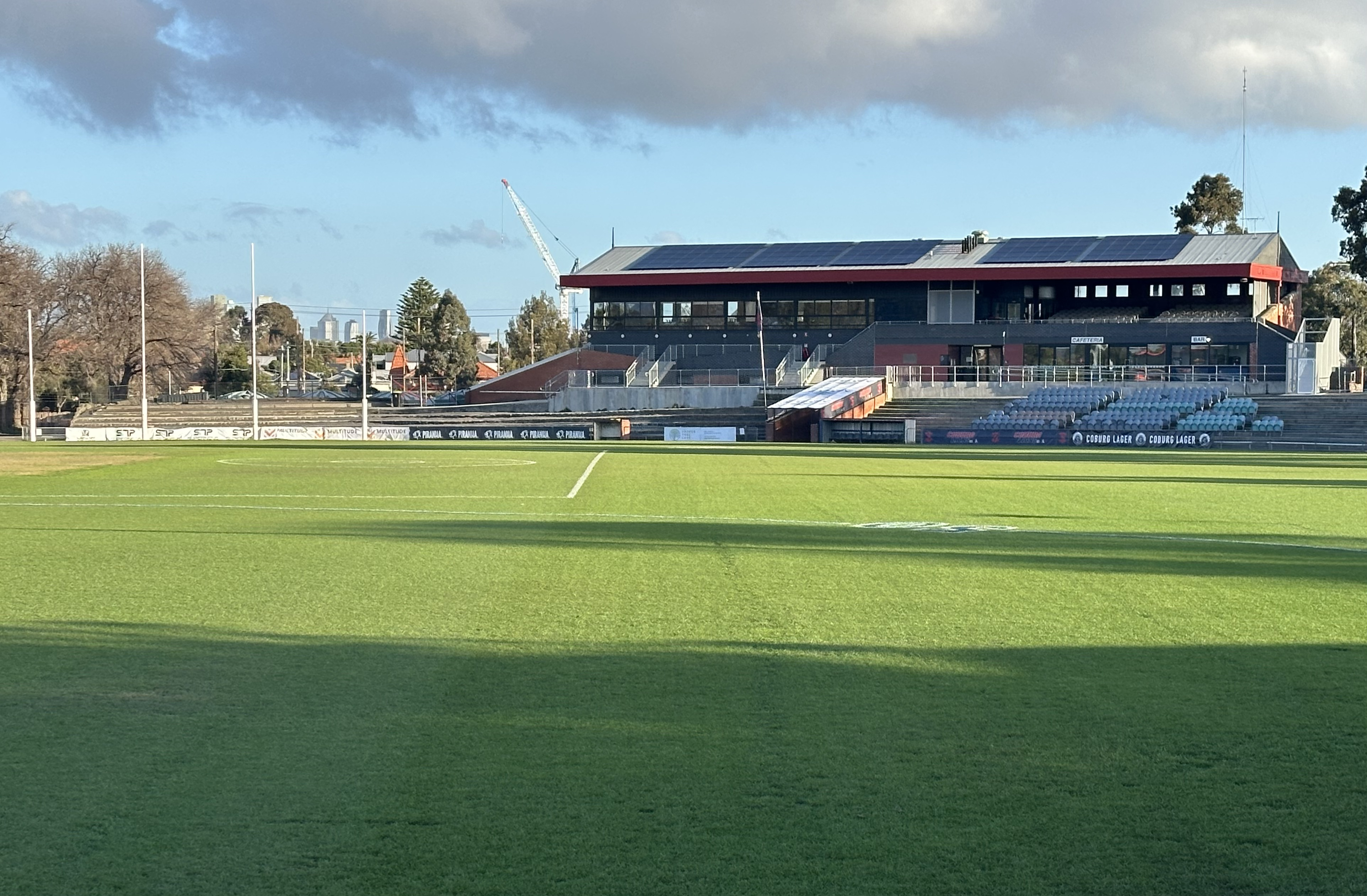
- Coburg City Oval in July 2026
- Interactive map of Coburg City Oval
- Former names: Piranha Park
- Location: Cnr Bell & Russell Sts, Coburg, Victoria
- Coordinates: 37°44′37″S 144°58′6″E
- Owner: City of Merri-bek
- Capacity: 12,000 (430 seated)
- Surface: Grass
- Record attendance: 21,626 (26 June 1965)
- Field size: 169 metres × 151 metres

Construction
- Opened: 1915

Tenants
- Coburg Football Club (VFA/VFL) (1925-present); West Coburg Football Club (EDFL); Coburg Cricket Club (VSDCA); North Melbourne Football Club (VFL, 1965); Murray Kangaroos (VFL, 2000–2002)

Coburg City Oval (known under naming rights as Barry Plant Park) is an Australian rules football and cricket venue located in the Melbourne suburb of Coburg. It is home to the Coburg Football Club and the Coburg Cricket Club.

== History ==
The oval was officially opened in 1915. Following the Coburg Football Club's admission to the Victorian Football Association in 1925, the grandstand was constructed, and was officially opened in March 1926. In the late 1920s and early 1930s, the venue was one of the VFA's finals venues, and it hosted the final in 1932. It later hosted the 1967 Division 2 finals series.

In 1965, the VFL's North Melbourne Football Club moved its playing and training base from the Arden Street Oval to Coburg City Oval. The move was intended to be permanent, with some initial negotiations seeking long-term leases for up to 40 years, but it was ultimately cancelled after only eight months, and North Melbourne returned to the Arden Street Oval in 1966.

During the 1965 VFL season, Coburg City Oval attracted an average of 13,146 spectators to its nine games. A ground record was set in round 10 against Collingwood, with a total attendance of 21,626. The ground's current capacity is around 15,000.

The oval is open to the citizens of Merri-bek and all others. The oval sits inside the wider G. A. Bridges Reserve, which includes a leisure centre, a bowls club and a former trugo club.

In 2018, following the efforts of the Coburg Football Club, and local residents the State Government of Victoria along with the City of Moreland announced a joint $6million investment into the redevelopment of the oval's grandstand and changerooms, which commenced in 2020.

In March 2014, Piranha signed a major sponsorship agreement, including ground naming rights, and renamed the oval Piranha Park. In March 2025, Coburg partnered with Barry Plant Coburg, signing a five-year agreement to rename the oval Barry Plant Park.
