= 1973 VFA season =

92nd season of the Victorian Football Association top division

Division 1
- Teams: 10
- Premiers: Prahran; 4th D1 premiership
- Minor premiers: Dandenong; 3rd D1 minor premiership

Division 2
- Teams: 10
- Premiers: Caulfield; 1st D2 premiership
- Minor premiers: Caulfield; 2nd D2 minor premiership

The 1973 VFA season was the 92nd season of the top division of the Victorian Football Association, an Australian rules football competition played in the state of Victoria, and the 13th season of second division competition.

The Division 1 premiership was won by the Prahran Football Club, after it came from fourth on the ladder to defeat Oakleigh in the Grand Final on 23 September by 35 points; it was Prahran's fourth Division 1 premiership.

The Division 2 premiership was won by Caulfield; it was the first and only premiership in either division won by the club after its move from Brighton to Caulfield in 1962.

== Division 1 ==
The Division 1 home-and-away season was played over 18 rounds; the top four then contested the finals under the Page–McIntyre system. The finals were played at the St Kilda Cricket Ground.

=== Ladder ===
1973 VFA Division 1 Ladder
Pos	Team	Pld	W	L	D	PF	PA	PP	Pts
1	Dandenong	18	12	5	1	2144	1834	116.9	50
2	Oakleigh	18	12	6	0	2048	1819	112.6	48
3	Port Melbourne	18	11	7	0	2186	2074	105.4	44
4	Prahran (P)	18	10	7	1	2203	1997	110.3	42
5	Geelong West	18	10	8	0	1986	1912	103.9	40
6	Williamstown	18	8	10	0	1867	1919	97.3	32
7	Sandringham	18	7	11	0	1861	2236	83.2	28
8	Sunshine	18	7	11	0	1820	2191	83.1	28
9	Preston	18	6	12	0	2118	2151	98.5	24
10	Coburg	18	5	11	2	1942	2026	95.9	24

Rules for classification: 1) points; 2) percentage; 3) number of points for.
(P) Premiers

=== Finals ===
	Semi-finals
Sunday, 2 September	Port Melbourne 10.17 (77)	def. by	Prahran 18.21 (129)	St Kilda Cricket Ground (crowd: 8,000)
Sunday, 9 September	Dandenong 13.23 (101)	def. by	Oakleigh 17.14 (116)	St Kilda Cricket Ground (crowd: 14,000)

	Preliminary Final
Sunday, 16 September	Dandenong 12.9 (81)	def. by	Prahran 16.14 (110)	St Kilda Cricket Ground (crowd: 13,600)

1973 VFA Division 1 Grand Final
Sunday, 23 September	Oakleigh	def. by	Prahran	St Kilda Cricket Ground (crowd: 21,200)
2.5 (17); 5.7 (37); 7.15 (57); 10.18 (78)	Q1; Q2; Q3; Final	2.4 (16); 8.11 (59); 12.17 (89); 15.23 (113)	Umpires: Stirling
Cloke 3, Halliday 2, Ford, Forster, O'Kane, Robbins, Taylor	Goals	Appleton 4, Weekes 3, Anderson 2, Smith 2, Emselle, Payne, Sinclair, Townsend
Quinn, for striking Rippon in the third quarter	Reports	Rippon, for striking Quinn in the third quarter Rippon, for striking Nesbit in the fourth quarter

=== Awards ===
- The leading goalkicker for the home-and-away season was Ian Cooper (Sandringham), who kicked 104 goals in the home-and-away season, but did not participate in finals. The leading goalkicker for the whole season including finals was Jim Miller (Dandenong); he kicked 94 goals in the home-and-away season to be third behind Cooper and Graeme McLean (Geelong West, 99 goals), then kicked fourteen goals in the finals to finish with 108 goals for the season.
- The J. J. Liston Trophy was won by Ray Shaw (Preston), who polled 39 votes. Shaw finished ahead of Ricky Browne (Geelong West), who finished second with 38 votes, and Les Stillman (Williamstown), who finished third with 28 votes.
- Port Melbourne won the seconds premiership for the second consecutive season. Port Melbourne 14.23 (107) defeated Preston 12.16 (88) in the Grand Final, played as a stand-alone match on Saturday 15 September at Skinner Reserve.
- Geelong West won the lightning premiership. Geelong West 8.3 (51) defeated Preston 2.9 (21) in the Grand Final, played as a curtain-raiser to the senior Grand Final on Sunday 23 September.

== Division 2 ==
The Division 2 home-and-away season was played over eighteen rounds; the top four then contested the finals under the Page–McIntyre system; all finals were played on Sundays at Toorak Park.

=== Ladder ===
1973 VFA Division 2 ladder
Pos	Team	Pld	W	L	D	PF	PA	PP	Pts
1	Caulfield (P)	18	15	3	0	2514	1611	156.1	60
2	Waverley	18	14	4	0	2570	1516	169.5	56
3	Brunswick	18	12	5	1	1987	1722	115.4	50
4	Camberwell	18	10	7	1	1881	1761	106.8	42
5	Frankston	18	10	7	1	2094	1989	105.3	42
6	Northcote	18	8	10	0	1745	2196	79.5	32
7	Werribee	18	7	11	0	1787	2040	87.6	28
8	Yarraville	18	6	11	1	1729	1994	86.7	26
9	Mordialloc	18	6	12	0	1692	2077	81.5	24
10	Box Hill	18	0	18	0	1475	2568	57.4	0

Rules for classification: 1) points; 2) percentage; 3) number of points for.
(P) Premiers

=== Finals ===
	Semi-finals
Sunday, 19 August	Brunswick 18.14 (122)	def.	Camberwell 10.18 (78)	Toorak Park (crowd: 4,500)
Sunday, 26 August	Caulfield 19.14 (128)	def.	Waverley 14.9 (93)	Toorak Park (crowd: 7,000)

	Preliminary Final
Sunday, 2 September	Waverley 14.7 (91)	def. by	Brunswick 17.18 (120)	Toorak Park (crowd: 4,000)

1973 VFA Division 2 Grand Final
Sunday, 9 September	Caulfield	def.	Brunswick	Toorak Park (crowd: 8,000)
4.4 (28); 10.6 (66); 12.10 (82); 18.20 (128)	Q1; Q2; Q3; Final	4.11 (35); 6.13 (49); 10.21 (81); 14.22 (106)	Umpires: John Gambetta
Logan 6, Hocking 4, Cliff 3, Jewell 3, Baker, Guinane	Goals	Hadzilias 3, Allen 2, Dimattina 2, Hobbs 2, Baird, Egan, Gutterson, Hanton, Liakaureas
Injuries	Horsington (concussion)
Scores were level in time-on in the final quarter before Caulfield kicked four late goals.

=== Awards ===
- The leading goalkicker for Division 2 was Doug Baird (Brunswick) who kicked 90 goals in the home-and-away season, and 94 goals overall.
- The J. Field Medal was won by Geoff Bryant (Box Hill); Bryant polled 57 votes, at a very high average of 3.2 votes per game, despite his club failing to win a single game for the year. He was a comfortable winner over Ron Allen (Waverley), who polled 45 votes, and Mick Martin (Yarraville), who polled 41 votes.
- Caulfield won the seconds premiership. Caulfield 11.14 (80) drew Brunswick 10.20 (80) in the Grand Final at Northcote Park on Saturday, 8 September; in the Grand Final Replay at Toorak Park on Saturday, 15 September, Caulfield 18.11 (119) d. Brunswick 13.20 (98).
- Caulfield also won the thirds premiership to be premiers in all three grades; as was the case in the seconds, the Grand Final was drawn; Caulfield 18.19 (127) defeated Waverley 16.10 (106) in the Grand Final Replay, held as a curtain-raiser to the seconds Grand Final Replay. It was the second time a club had won all three grades in the same season.

== Notable events ==
- On 22 April, Dandenong defeated Geelong West by five points, ending Geelong West's 22-game winning streak which dated back to 1971.
- On 29 April, Waverley 36.20 (236) defeated Box Hill 11.13 (81); at the time, it was the equal-third highest score in Association history. On 13 May, only two weeks later, Waverley matched this score again; Waverley 35.26 (236) d. Werribee 7.4 (46).
- In the final round of the Division 1 home-and-away season, the bottom two teams Coburg and Preston played off against each other at Coburg City Oval in a match which directly determined which of the two clubs was relegated. Despite their respective positions on the ladder, the match attracted between 13,000 and 15,000 spectators, the highest crowd of the home-and-away season. Preston 27.9 (171) defeated Coburg 22.22 (154) in a high scoring game, to hold its place in the top division.
- Coburg was relegated despite a win–loss record 5–12–2 and a high percentage of 95.8, setting a new record as the best performance by a wooden spooner in Association history. In addition to its two draws, Coburg lost four matches by less than a goal.
- Camberwell qualified for the finals for the first time since 1961, clinching its finals position with a one-point win against Waverley in the final round of the season; Camberwell 15.17 (107) d. Waverley 15.16 (106).
- Box Hill was the first club to finish a season winless since Brighton in 1961; however, the club did go on to win its first two matches in the lightning premiership.
- The Division 2 Grand Final was held up for four minutes during the final quarter when all of the match footballs were lost; a replacement ball was eventually found in the Toorak Park club rooms.

== See also ==
- List of VFA/VFL premiers
