= Glenister =

Glenister is a surname. It may refer to:

- Clement Glenister (1897– 1968), English Royal Navy officer and cricketer
- Ernie Glenister (1873–1942), Australian rules footballer
- John Glenister (1932–2024), British television director
- Mick Glenister (1917–2010), Australian rules footballer
- Mikey Glenister (born 1984), British musician
- Norm Glenister (1915–1963), Australian football player
- Pete Glenister, English guitarist, songwriter and producer
- Philip Glenister (born 1963), British actor
- Robert Glenister (born 1960), British actor
- Stewart Glenister (born 1988), American Samoan swimmer
- Wally Glenister (1918–1972), Australian rules footballer
