= 1972 VFA season =

Division 1
- Teams: 10
- Premiers: Oakleigh; 6th D1 premiership
- Minor premiers: Oakleigh; 4th D1 minor premiership

Division 2
- Teams: 10
- Premiers: Geelong West; 3rd D2 premiership
- Minor premiers: Geelong West; 1st D2 minor premiership

The 1972 Victorian Football Association season was the 91st season of the top division of the Australian rules football competition, and the twelfth season of second division competition. The Division 1 premiership was won by the Oakleigh Football Club, after it defeated Dandenong in the Grand Final on 24 September by 44 points; it was Oakleigh's sixth and final Division 1 premiership. The Division 2 premiership was won by Geelong West, which went undefeated through the season with an overall record of 20–0, becoming the first team since North Melbourne in 1918 to complete a perfect season; overall, it was the club's third Division 2 premiership.

== Division 1 ==
The Division 1 home-and-away season was played over 18 rounds; the top four then contested the finals under the Page–McIntyre system. The finals were played at the St Kilda Cricket Ground.

=== Ladder ===
1972 VFA Division 1 Ladder
	TEAM	P	W	L	D	PF	PA	Pct	PTS
1	Oakleigh (P)	18	13	5	0	2315	1942	119.2	52
2	Dandenong	18	11	6	1	2039	1963	103.8	46
3	Williamstown	18	11	7	0	2022	1821	111.0	44
4	Preston	18	11	7	0	2050	1929	106.2	44
5	Port Melbourne	18	10	7	1	2076	1902	109.1	42
6	Sunshine	18	8	10	0	2051	1969	104.2	32
7	Sandringham	18	8	10	0	1941	2043	95.0	32
8	Coburg	18	6	12	0	1895	2082	91.0	24
9	Prahran	18	6	12	0	1849	2134	86.6	24
10	Waverley	18	5	13	0	1764	2217	79.5	20
Key: P = Played, W = Won, L = Lost, D = Drawn, PF = Points For, PA = Points Against, Pct = Percentage; (P) = Premiers, PTS = Premiership points								Source	

=== Finals ===
	Semi-finals
Sunday, 3 September	Williamstown 22.19 (151)	def.	Preston 19.17 (131)	St Kilda Cricket Ground (crowd: 15,000)
Sunday, 10 September	Oakleigh 27.15 (177)	def.	Dandenong 16.19 (115)	St Kilda Cricket Ground (crowd: 13,000)

	Preliminary Final
Sunday, 17 September	Dandenong 22.14 (146)	def.	Williamstown 11.16 (82)	St Kilda Cricket Ground (crowd: 10,000)

1972 VFA Division 1 Grand Final
Sunday, 24 September	Oakleigh	def.	Dandenong	St Kilda Cricket Ground (crowd: 22,400)
4.6 (30); 11.12 (78); 15.13 (103); 25.17 (167)	Q1; Q2; Q3; Final	2.6 (18); 8.8 (56); 13.14 (92); 18.15 (123)	Umpires: Hayes
Murnane 7, Johnson 5, Taylor 4, Barrot 2, Carr 2, J. Lilley 2, Colcott, Ford, Robbins	Goals	Miller 9, Flaherty 4, Hibbert 2, Davies, Ellis, Shinners
Wenn, for striking Miller in the first quarter West, for striking Miller in the first quarter West, for striking Ellis in the third quarter	Reports	Miller, for striking Wenn in the first quarter

=== Awards ===
- The leading goalkicker for the season was Len Clark (Preston), who kicked 100 goals in the home-and-away season and 107 goals overall.
- The J. J. Liston Trophy was won by Don McKenzie (Sunshine), who polled 34 votes. McKenzie finished ahead of Brian Ford (Oakleigh), who finished second with 31 votes, and Bob Skilton (Port Melbourne), who finished third with 28 votes.
- Port Melbourne won the seconds premiership. Port Melbourne 14.18 (102) defeated Prahran 9.12 (66) in the Grand Final, played as a stand-alone match on Saturday 16 September.
- Coburg won the lightning premiership. Coburg 6.2 (38) defeated Port Melbourne 3.8 (26) in the Grand Final, played as a curtain-raiser to the senior Grand Final on Sunday 24 September.

== Division 2 ==
The Division 2 home-and-away season was played over eighteen rounds; the top four then contested the finals under the Page–McIntyre system; all finals were played on Sundays at Toorak Park.

=== Ladder ===
1972 VFA Division 2 Ladder
	TEAM	P	W	L	D	PF	PA	Pct	PTS
1	Geelong West (P)	18	18	0	0	2696	1517	177.7	72
2	Caulfield	18	15	3	0	2377	1694	140.3	60
3	Brunswick	18	11	7	0	1940	1938	100.1	44
4	Yarraville	18	9	8	1	2087	1989	104.9	38
5	Northcote	18	9	9	0	1846	1973	93.5	36
6	Camberwell	18	7	11	0	2081	2197	94.7	36
7	Box Hill	18	6	12	0	1969	2099	93.8	24
8	Mordialloc	18	6	12	0	1547	2371	65.2	24
9	Frankston	18	5	13	0	2018	2141	94.2	20
10	Werribee	18	3	14	1	1783	2425	73.5	12
Key: P = Played, W = Won, L = Lost, D = Drawn, PF = Points For, PA = Points Against, Pct = Percentage; (P) = Premiers, PTS = Premiership points								Source	

=== Finals ===
	Semi-finals
Sunday, 20 August	Brunswick 14.19 (103)	def. by	Yarraville 15.16 (106)	Toorak Park
Sunday, 27 August	Geelong West 17.18 (120)	def.	Caulfield 17.13 (115)	Toorak Park (crowd: 9,000)

	Preliminary Final
Sunday, 3 September	Caulfield 31.23 (209)	def.	Yarraville 16.11 (107)	Toorak Park (crowd: 5,000)

1972 VFA Division 2 Grand Final
Sunday, 10 September	Geelong West	def.	Caulfield	Toorak Park (crowd: 10,000)
4.1 (25); 7.10 (52); 10.13 (73); 14.16 (100)	Q1; Q2; Q3; Final	2.5 (17); 3.5 (23); 13.7 (85); 14.10 (94)	Umpires: Torney
McLean 3, M. Browne 2, R. Browne 2, Harris 2, Colley, Gilles, Irvin, Linke, Manson	Goals	Williams 5, R. Brown 2, Guinane 2, Baker, Cliff, Hamblin, Hocking, Logan
Reports	Renownden, for striking Manson in the first quarter Hocking, for striking Deeath in the second quarter

=== Awards ===
- The leading goalkicker for Division 2 was Graeme McLean (Geelong West) who kicked 129 goals in the home-and-away season, and 137 goals overall. McLean's total was the highest by any player in a season since Ron Todd kicked 188 goals in 1945.
- The J. Field Medal was won by Wayne Schimmelbusch (Brunswick), who polled 39 votes. Schimmelbusch finished ahead of Ron Brown (Yarraville), who finished second with 36 votes, and John Knott (Yarraville), who finished third with 27 votes.
- Brunswick won the seconds premiership for the second consecutive season. Brunswick 19.14 (128) defeated Frankston 12.16 (88) in the Grand Final, held as a stand-alone match on Saturday 9 September at Northcote Park.

== Notable events ==
=== Geelong West's perfect season ===
Geelong West won all twenty games it played during the 1972 season, becoming the third team to complete a perfect season in Association history. It was the first time the feat had been achieved since North Melbourne in 1918, and the last time it was achieved until Port Melbourne in 2011. Geelong West entered the season after being relegated from Division 1 at the end of 1971, although it was not disgraced during that season, as its win–loss record of 6–12 was at the time the best ever for a wooden-spooner. Geelong West's Thirds team was also unbeaten during the 1972 season.

Geelong West's unbeaten record hides the fact that it was very evenly matched with runners-up Caulfield; three of Geelong West's four wins against Caulfield, including both finals, were by a goal or less:

- In the home-and-away match on 11 June, which attracted a ground record crowd estimated to be between 10,000 and 12,000 to West Oval, Geelong West defeated Caulfield, 17.10 (112) to 15.18 (108), after Brown for Caulfield missed a set shot for goal on or after the final siren.
- In the second semi-final, Caulfield led Geelong West by one point at the very end of the game. Geelong West ruckman Alex Andjelkovic, who had come on in the final quarter as the 17th man, marked 25-35 yards from goal with seconds remaining; his kick after the siren, an ugly kick with which he also accidentally took a divot out of the ground, just went through for a goal to give Geelong West a five-point victory, Geelong West 17.18 (120) d. Caulfield 17.13 (115).
- In the Grand Final, Geelong West led by 29 points at half time. Caulfield came from behind, scored ten goals to three in the third quarter, with John Williams kicking the first four of those from his first four kicks of the quarter, to lead by 12 points at three-quarter time, but Geelong West fought back in the final quarter to take a six-point lead. Ernie Baker had the chance to tie the game for Caulfield and force a replay, when he was awarded a free kick from 35yds out on an angle in the 32nd minute; his kick was accurate but fell short to be marked in the goal-square, and the siren sounded soon after; Geelong West 14.16 (100) d. Caulfield 14.10 (94).

=== Lightning premiership ===
In 1972, the Association established a post-season lightning premiership, contested by the twelve teams which did not reach the finals (six from each division). Matches were played as curtain-raisers to senior finals matches on Sundays, and were played at half the length of a normal match over two periods of play. The format of the competition was knock-out, and was arranged such that the Division 1 teams competed separately to the Division 2 teams up to the semi-final stage; then, the semi-final stage was contested by three Division 1 teams and one Division 2 team. The post-season lightning premiership was contested from 1972 until 1979.

=== Other notable events ===
- Prior to the season, Port Melbourne recruited two of the greatest players in the history of Australian rules football: Bob Skilton and Ron Barassi. Both players were later among the twelve inaugural Legends inducted into the Australian Football Hall of Fame in 1996, and Skilton was a three-time Brownlow Medallist in the Victorian Football League; so that both were playing alongside each other at Port Melbourne was a substantial recruiting coup for the Association. The two recruits had very different experiences at Port Melbourne: Skilton, 33 years old and recruited from South Melbourne, was still a top class player, and he finished third in the J. J. Liston Trophy voting, only six votes short of victory, despite playing only 11 of Port Melbourne's 18 games due to business commitments; conversely, Barassi was 36 years old and had been a non-playing coach at Carlton for the previous 2½ years, and he managed only four games before a hamstring injury forced his retirement.
- On 9 July, Lyall Henriksen (Dandenong) was reported for assaulting field umpire Andrew Craig, striking him first in the back, then in the stomach as Craig approached to report him. He was suspended until the start of the 1974 season for the incident.
- Early in the final quarter of the game between Oakleigh and Port Melbourne on 20 August, Phil Fryer (Oakleigh) ran into the behind post and snapped it at its base. After a five-minute delay in which no viable repair strategy was developed, an Oakleigh official was assigned to stand on the boundary line and hold the broken post in position for the rest of the game.

== See also ==
- List of VFA/VFL Premiers
