= Jayden Pitt =

Australian rules footballer

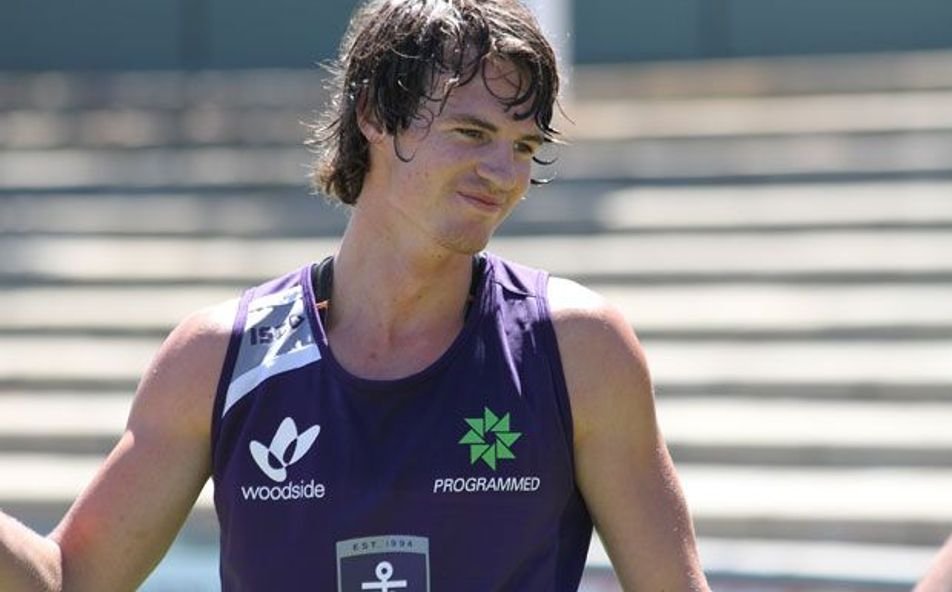

Personal information
- Born: 7 October 1992 (age 34); Geelong, Victoria
- Original teams: Geelong Falcons (TAC Cup) and St Albans Football Club
- Draft: No. 20, 2010 National Draft
- Height: 190 cm (6 ft 3 in)
- Weight: 83 kg (183 lb)
- Position: Forward / midfield

Playing career^{1}
Years	Club	Games (Goals)
2011–2012	Fremantle	10 (2)
- ^{1} Playing statistics correct to the end of 2013.

Jayden Pitt (born 7 October 1992) is an Australian rules footballer who played for the Fremantle Football Club in the Australian Football League (AFL). He is a quick, agile, goalkicking midfielder who is a good kick with either foot.

== Football career ==
Originally from Geelong, Victoria, where he attended Newcomb Secondary College, he played for the Geelong Falcons in the TAC Cup and also senior football at age 16 for the St Albans Football Club in the Geelong Football League. He represented Victoria Country at the 2010 AFL Under 18 Championships and was named in the All-Australian team at the conclusion of the championships. In the lead-up to the 2010 AFL draft it was predicted that he would be selected by the new Gold Coast side with selection 11 or 13, but he slipped down the draft order to be drafted to Fremantle with their first selection, number 20 overall. He was the first player from the St Albans club to be drafted into the AFL.

The lightest player on Fremantle's list at only 70 kilograms (150 lb), Pitt was expected to mainly play for the Perth Football Club in the WAFL during 2011, until he added bulk to his body. But after playing in only two partial games during the 2011 pre-season, Pitt was a surprise selection to make his AFL debut in the opening round of the 2011 AFL season against the Brisbane Lions at the Gabba. He performed well, playing mainly on the wing and kicking Fremantle's first goal of the match in their 2-point win. He wears guernsey number 4 for Fremantle, as previously worn by Paul Hasleby.

At the beginning of the 2013 season, Pitt discovered that he had a heart irregularity and risked death if he continued to play football. At the end of the season he announced his retirement from football.

After his football career he then studied at Deakin University for primary school teacher. Now he is currently a teacher at Montpellier Primary School.
