= List of Geelong Football Club leading goalkickers =

The following is a list of Geelong Football Club leading goalkickers in each season of the Australian Football League (formerly the Victorian Football League).

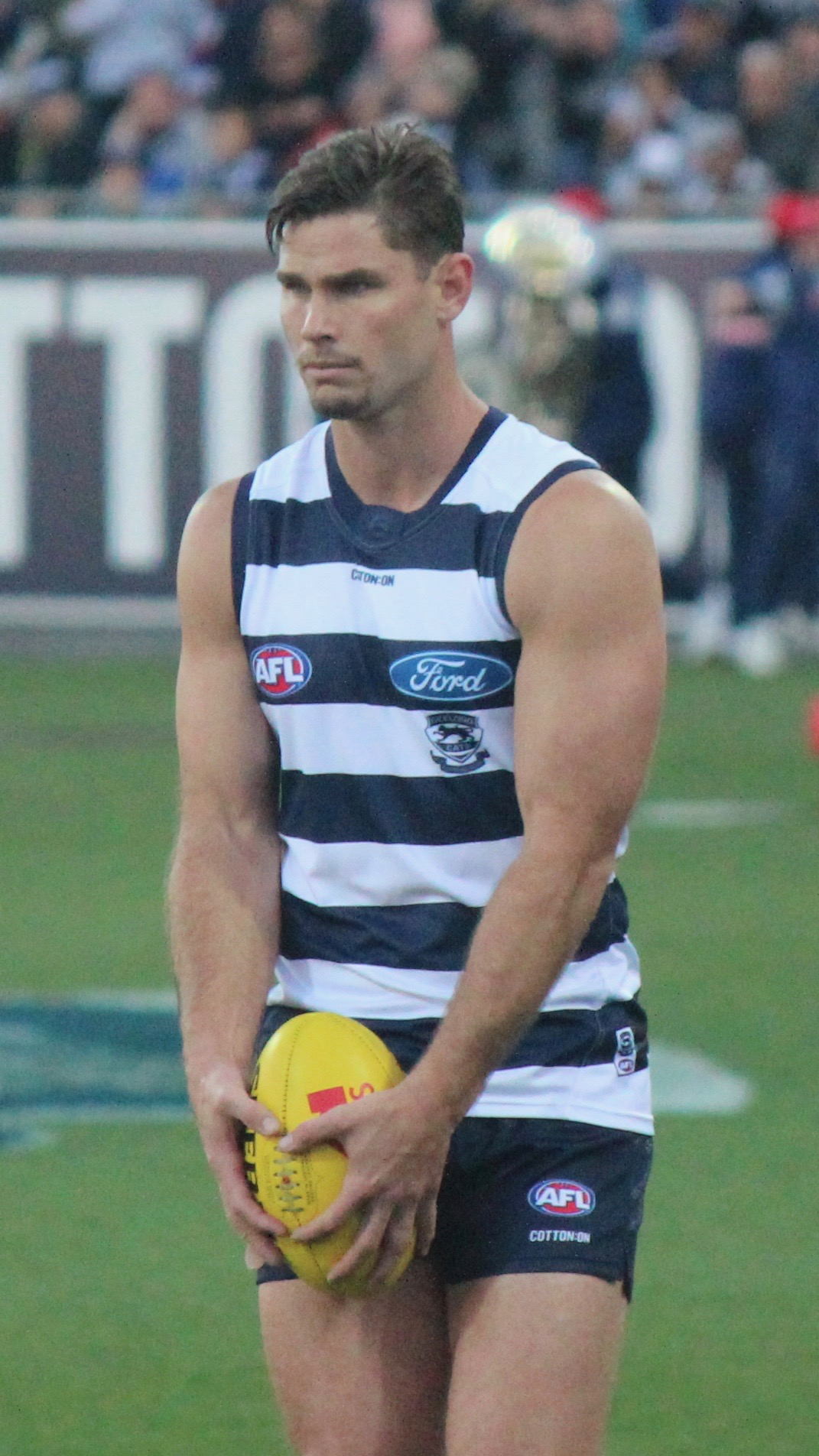
Tom Hawkins was Geelong's leading goalkicker for 11-straight seasons from 2012–2022.

== AFL leading goalkickers ==
| ^ | Denotes current player |
| + | Player won Coleman Medal in same season |

| Season | Player(s) | Goals |
|---|---|---|
| 1897 | Eddy James | 22 |
| 1898 | Eddy James (2) | 26 |
| 1899 | Eddy James (3) | 31 |
| 1900 | Teddy Lockwood | 24 |
| 1901 | Charles Coles | 24 |
| 1902 | Ike Woods | 16 |
| 1903 | Ike Woods (2) | 34 |
| 1904 | Ike Woods (3) | 20 |
| 1905 | Ike Woods (4) | 19 |
| 1906 | Les Roebuck | 21 |
| 1907 | Tom Sherry | 18 |
| 1908 | Tom Hardiman | 25 |
| 1909 | Percy Martini | 17 |
| 1910 | Percy Martini (2) | 51 |
| 1911 | Percy Martini (3) | 40 |
| 1912 | Percy Martini (4) | 41 |
| 1913 | Percy Martini (5) | 46 |
| 1914 | Percy Martini (6) | 45 |
| 1915 | Tom Brownlees | 25 |
| 1917 | Percy Martini (7) | 23 |
| 1918 | Percy Martini (8) | 24 |
| 1919 | Percy Martini (9) | 19 |
| 1920 | Cliff Rankin | 48 |
| 1921 | Cliff Rankin (2) | 63 |
| 1922 | Cliff Rankin (3) | 42 |
| 1923 | Cliff Rankin (4) | 43 |
| 1924 | Lloyd Hagger | 42 |
| 1925 | Lloyd Hagger (2) | 78 |
| 1926 | Lloyd Hagger (3) | 56 |
| 1927 | Lloyd Hagger (4) | 55 |
| 1928 | Jack Chambers | 28 |
| 1929 | Jack Plunkett | 29 |
| 1930 | Bill Kuhlken | 57 |
| 1931 | George Moloney | 74 |
| 1932 | George Moloney (2) | 109 |
| 1933 | George Moloney (3) | 68 |
| 1934 | Jack Metherell | 43 |
| 1935 | Jack Evans | 32 |
| 1936 | Jack Metherell (2) | 58 |
| 1937 | Jack Metherell (3) | 71 |
| 1938 | Clyde Helmer | 74 |
| 1939 | Norm Glenister | 36 |
| 1940 | Jack Grant | 47 |
| 1941 | Lindsay White | 67 |
| 1944 | Lindsay White (2) | 60 |
| 1945 | Vic Nankervis | 43 |
| 1946 | Russell Renfrey | 28 |
| 1947 | Lindsay White (3) | 76 |
| 1948 | Lindsay White (4) | 86 |
| 1949 | Lindsay White (5) | 53 |
| 1950 | George Goninon | 45 |
| 1951 | George Goninon (2) | 86 |
| 1952 | George Goninon (3) | 59 |
| 1953 | George Goninon (4) | 65 |
| 1954 | Fred Flanagan | 55 |
| 1955 | Noel Rayson+ | 80 |
| 1956 | Noel Rayson (2) | 41 |
| 1957 | Fred Wooller | 56 |
| 1958 | Neil Trezise | 27 |
| 1959 | Fred Wooller (2) | 27 |
| 1960 | Fred Wooller (3) | 29 |
| 1961 | Doug Wade | 51 |
| 1962 | Doug Wade+ (2) | 68 |
| 1963 | Doug Wade (3) | 48 |
| 1964 | Doug Wade (4) | 41 |
| 1965 | Gareth Andrews | 35 |
| 1966 | Doug Wade (5) | 52 |
| 1967 | Doug Wade+ (6) | 96 |
| 1968 | Doug Wade (7) | 64 |
| 1969 | Doug Wade+ (8) | 127 |
| 1970 | Doug Wade (9) | 74 |
| 1971 | Doug Wade (10) | 94 |
| 1972 | Doug Wade (11) | 90 |
| 1973 | David Clarke | 45 |
| 1974 | Paul Sarah | 32 |
| 1975 | Larry Donohue | 29 |
| 1975 | Ian Nankervis | 29 |
| 1976 | Larry Donohue+ (2) | 105 |
| 1977 | Larry Donohue (3) | 63 |
| 1978 | Larry Donohue (4) | 95 |
| 1979 | David Clarke (2) | 40 |
| 1980 | Terry Bright | 59 |
| 1981 | Terry Bright (2) | 48 |
| 1982 | Michael Turner | 40 |
| 1983 | Terry Bright (3) | 26 |
| 1984 | Mark Jackson | 74 |
| 1985 | Gary Ablett, Sr. | 82 |
| 1986 | Gary Ablett, Sr. (2) | 65 |
| 1987 | Bruce Lindner | 62 |
| 1988 | Gary Ablett, Sr. (3) | 82 |
| 1989 | Gary Ablett, Sr. (4) | 87 |
| 1990 | Gary Ablett, Sr. (5) | 75 |
| 1991 | Billy Brownless | 81 |
| 1992 | Billy Brownless (2) | 79 |
| 1993 | Gary Ablett, Sr.+ (6) | 124 |
| 1994 | Gary Ablett, Sr.+ (7) | 129 |
| 1995 | Gary Ablett, Sr.+ (8) | 122 |
| 1996 | Gary Ablett, Sr. (9) | 69 |
| 1997 | Ronnie Burns | 50 |
| 1998 | Ronnie Burns (2) | 35 |
| 1998 | Brett Spinks | 35 |
| 1999 | Ronnie Burns (3) | 34 |
| 2000 | Ronnie Burns (4) | 39 |
| 2000 | David Mensch | 39 |
| 2001 | Ronnie Burns (5) | 33 |
| 2001 | Ben Graham | 33 |
| 2002 | Kent Kingsley | 57 |
| 2003 | Kent Kingsley (2) | 33 |
| 2004 | Kent Kingsley (3) | 48 |
| 2005 | Kent Kingsley (4) | 57 |
| 2006 | Gary Ablett, Jr. | 35 |
| 2007 | Cameron Mooney | 67 |
| 2008 | Steve Johnson | 53 |
| 2009 | Cameron Mooney (2) | 46 |
| 2010 | Steve Johnson (2) | 63 |
| 2011 | James Podsiadly | 52 |
| 2012 | Tom Hawkins | 62 |
| 2013 | Tom Hawkins (2) | 49 |
| 2014 | Tom Hawkins (3) | 68 |
| 2015 | Tom Hawkins (4) | 46 |
| 2016 | Tom Hawkins (5) | 55 |
| 2017 | Tom Hawkins (6) | 51 |
| 2018 | Tom Hawkins (7) | 60 |
| 2019 | Tom Hawkins (8) | 56 |
| 2020 | Tom Hawkins+ (9) | 49 |
| 2021 | Tom Hawkins (10) | 62 |
| 2022 | Tom Hawkins (11) | 67 |
| 2023 | Jeremy Cameron^ | 53 |
| 2024 | Jeremy Cameron^ (2) | 64 |
| 2025 | Jeremy Cameron+ (3) | 88 |
| 2026 | Shannon Neale^ | 52 |

== AFL Women's leading goalkickers ==
| ^ | Denotes current player |
| + | Player won AFL Women's leading goalkicker award in same season |

| Season | Player(s) | Goals |
|---|---|---|
| 2019 | Mia-Rae Clifford | 6 |
| 2020 | Richelle Cranston | 5 |
| 2021 | Richelle Cranston (2) | 5 |
| 2022 (S6) | Phoebe McWilliams | 10 |
| 2022 (S7) | Chloe Scheer^ | 13 |
| 2023 | Chloe Scheer^ (2) | 20 |
| 2024 | Aishling Moloney+ | 21 |
| 2025 | Aishling Moloney (2) | 17 |
