= John Fitzgerald (Australian footballer, born 1961) =

Australian rules footballer

Personal information
- Full name: John Fitzgerald
- Born: 21 November 1961 (age 64)
- Original team: St Joseph's
- Height: 178 cm (5 ft 10 in)
- Weight: 73 kg (161 lb)
- Position: Rover

Playing career^{1}
Years	Club	Games (Goals)
1986–1987	Geelong	8 (5)
- ^{1} Playing statistics correct to the end of 1987.

John Fitzgerald (born 21 November 1961) is a former Australian rules footballer who played with Geelong in the Victorian Football League (VFL).

Fitzgerald played under 19s football at Geelong, then instead of pursuing a VFL career played with St Joseph's in the Geelong Football League. A rover, Fitzgerald was lured back to the club in 1986 and appeared in the final five rounds of the season. He played a further three games early in the 1987 VFL season.

In 1989, Fitzgerald captained St Joseph's to a premiership and was named "best and ground" in the grand final.

He coached South Barwon from 2000 to 2003, which included a premiership in 2001. From 2007 to 2011 he was senior coach of Bell Park and steered them to a premiership in his final season. He took a break from coaching in 2012, before being named coach of Drysdale in the Bellarine Football League, for the 2013 season.
