= Brendan McCartney =

Australian rules football coach

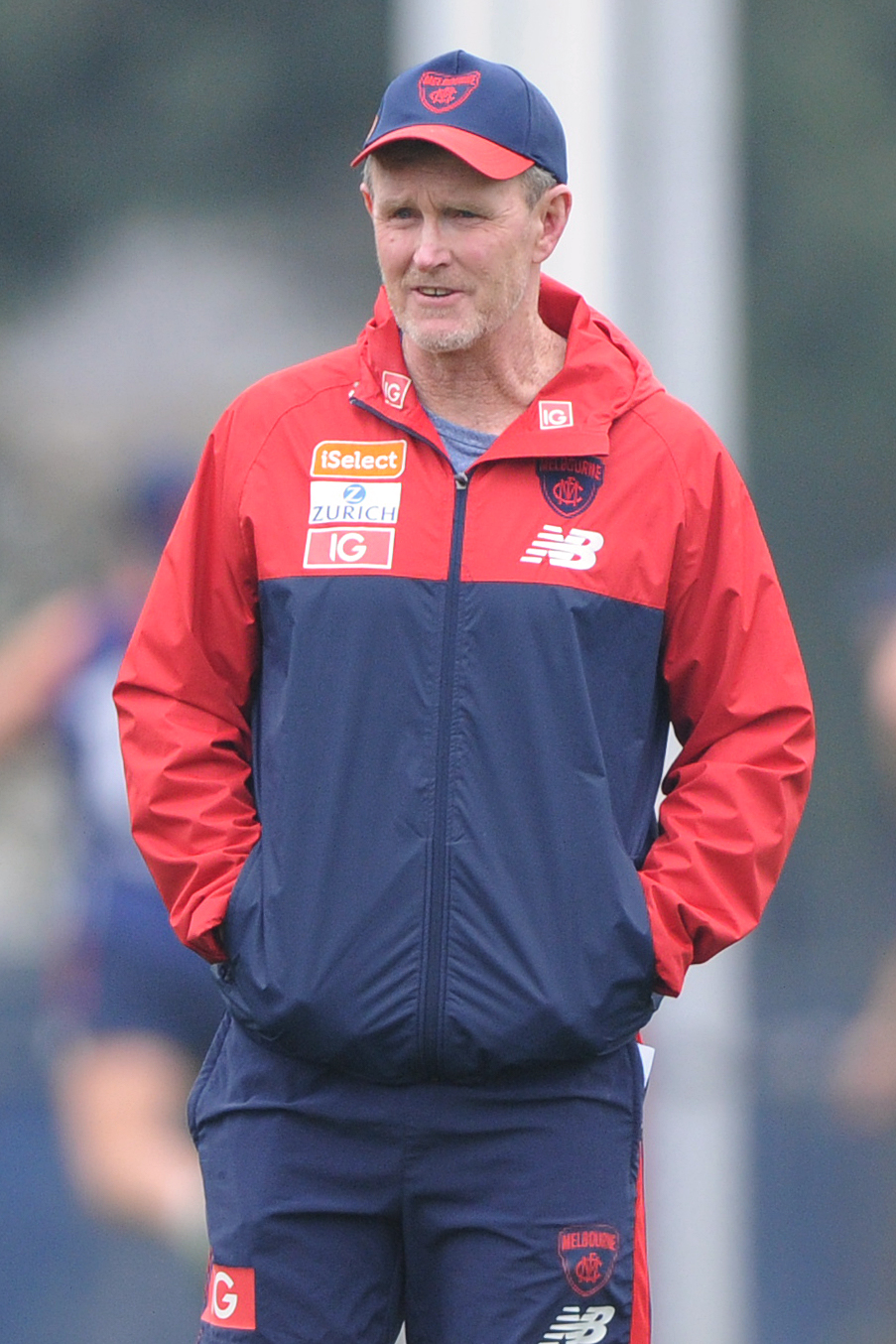
- McCartney in April 2018

Personal information
- Full name: Brendan McCartney
- Born: 23 October 1960 (age 66); Nyah, Victoria
- Original team: Newtown & Chilwell Football Club (GFL)

Coaching career^{3}
Years	Club	Games (W–L–D)
2012–2014	Western Bulldogs	66 (20–46–0)
2025–	Port Melbourne	18 (6-11-1)
- ^{3} Coaching statistics correct as of 2014.

Brendan McCartney (born 23 October 1960) is the former senior coach of the Western Bulldogs football club in the Australian Football League (AFL). He coached 66 games in 3 seasons before he resigned from the job. He has served as the development and strategy coach of the Melbourne Football Club since 2015.

== Playing career ==
In his playing days, Brendan McCartney played in the Geelong Football League for the Newtown & Chilwell Football Club. He is one of the few AFL coaches who never played at the highest level. His father, Graeme McCartney, played one senior game with Richmond in 1957.

== Coaching career ==
After persistent injury curtailed his local playing career and premature retirement at 27, he first began coaching Newtown & Chilwell's reserves. Soon after, McCartney was appointed the head coach of the Ocean Grove Football Club. He guided the football club to four consecutive Bellarine Football League premierships from 1994 until 1997.

=== Richmond Football Club assistant coach ===
In 1998, he took a role with AFL club Richmond as assistant and development coach.

=== Geelong Football Club assistant coach ===
From 2000 to 2010, McCartney was an assistant coach with Geelong Football Club. In 2010, McCartney was voted the AFL's assistant coach of the year by the AFL Coaches Association awards.

=== Essendon Football Club assistant coach ===
McCartney moved to be the assistant coach in the position of forward line coach at Essendon in 2011.

=== Western Bulldogs senior coach ===
Shortly after the conclusion of the 2011 AFL season, McCartney was appointed as the senior coach of the Western Bulldogs under a three-year contract, replacing the outgoing caretaker senior coach Paul Williams, who replaced Rodney Eade, after Eade stepped down during the 2011 season with three games left to go in the season after Eade was told he would not receive a contract extension for the Bulldogs. When McCartney was appointed as the Bulldogs senior coach, he edged out favourite and former Bulldog Leon Cameron who was well regarded as a "high quality field". He took the Western Bulldogs for their training session for the first time on 7 November 2011.

In McCartney's first season as Bulldogs senior coach in the 2012 season, McCartney guided the Bulldogs to finish fifteenth on the ladder with five wins and seventeen losses. McCartney came under heavy criticism after the Bulldogs lost to expansion team Gold Coast Suns in Round 8 during the 2013 season, but the team had a better second half to the season, which included promising performances against top 8 teams Essendon, Hawthorn and Sydney, as well as wins against Carlton, West Coast and Adelaide. McCartney guided Bulldogs to finish fifteenth on the ladder again for the second straight year in a row at the end of the 2013 season, this time with eight wins and fourteen losses. As a result of the encouraging performances in the second half, McCartney received a two-year contract extension on 26 November 2013 and he was to be contracted to the end of the 2016 season.

In the 2014 season, McCartney guided Bulldogs to finish fourteenth on the ladder with seven wins and fifteen losses. Following speculation after the 2014 AFL season, which concluded with the Bulldogs losing to Greater Western Sydney in the final match of the regular season in Round 23, 2014, McCartney resigned as senior coach of the Western Bulldogs on 10 October 2014, at the conclusion of the 2014 season. When captain Ryan Griffen announced he wanted to leave the club the day before McCartney's resignation, it was reported that McCartney's relationship with Griffen caused him to want to leave the club. McCartney coached Western Bulldogs Football Club to a total of 66 games with 20 wins and 46 losses to a winning percentage of 30 percent. McCartney was then replaced by Luke Beveridge as the Western Bulldogs senior coach.

=== Melbourne Football Club assistant coach ===
McCartney joined the Melbourne Football Club coaching staff in an assistant coaching role as a development and strategy coach under senior coach Paul Roos from the 2015 season. McCartney left the Melbourne Football Club at the end of the 2019 season.

In October 2019, McCartney stated that he left the Melbourne Football Club after he "started losing the drive and motivation that came with preparing the team both during the weekend and on game day" and "I just felt myself losing a love of the element to the week, I stepped forward and said to the coaches in a bit of mid-season review that it was time to step back".

=== Port Melbourne Football Club senior coach (VFL) ===
On 19 August 2024, the Port Melbourne Football Club in the Victorian Football League announced the hiring of Brendan McCartney as senior coach, beginning in 2025. McCartney was signed on a three-year deal.

== Coaching statistics ==
Legend
W	Wins	L	Losses	D	Draws	W%	Winning percentage	LP	Ladder position	LT	League teams

Season	Team	Games	W	L	D	W %	LP	LT
2012	Western Bulldogs	22	5	17	0	22.7%	15	18
2013	Western Bulldogs	22	8	14	0	36.4%	15	18
2014	Western Bulldogs	22	7	15	0	31.8%	14	18
Career totals		66	20	46	0	30.3%		
