= Lara Sporting Club =

Lara

Names
- Full name: Lara Sporting Club
- Nickname(s): Cats

Club details
- Founded: 1880; 145 years ago
- Colours
- Premierships: (10): 1912, 1929, 1930, 1937, 1952, 1965, 1986, 1988, 1994, 2002
- Ground(s): Recreation Reserve

Uniforms
Home

Other information
- Official website: larasportingclub.com.au

The Lara Sporting Club, nicknamed the Cats, is an Australian sports club based in the city of Lara, Victoria.

The club's Australian rules football and netball teams currently compete in the Geelong Football Netball League. Lara play its home games at Lara Recreation Reserve. Other sections of the club include baseball and cricket.

Lara is situated between Geelong and Werribee on the main Geelong rail line so over the years the club has played in competitions to the East and West of the town.

== History ==
- 1907-1914 Geelong Football Association
- 1919-1927 Werribee Lara Football Association
- 1928-1932 Geelong Athletic Societies League
- 1933-1935 Geelong Football Association
- 1936-1946 Werribee District Football League
- 1947-1988 Geelong & District Football League
- 1989-2019 Geelong Football League

== Merger ==
In 1975 the Football club and the cricket merged to form the Lara Sporting Club.

== Geelong Football League ==
After winning two premierships in three years Lara opted to move into the GFL in 1989. In 2015 the League was absorbed into the AFL Barwon Football League.

== VFL / AFL players ==
- Paul Lynch - Geelong
- Allen Christensen – Geelong, Brisbane Lions
- Josh Walker – Geelong, Brisbane Lions
- Michael Kol – Geelong
- Nigel Kol – Geelong
- Devon Smith - Greater Western Sydney, Essendon

== Bibliography ==
- Cat Country: History of Football In The Geelong Region by John Stoward – ISBN 978-0-9577515-8-3
