= Grovedale Football Club =

Grovedale

Names
- Full name: Grovedale Tigers Football Netball Club
- Nickname: Tigers

Club details
- Founded: 1947; 78 years ago
- Colours
- Premierships: (3): 1909, 1963, 1975, 1977
- Ground: Burdoo Reserve

Uniforms
Home

Other information
- Official website: grovedaletigers.com.au

The Grovedale Tigers Football Netball Club, nicknamed the Tigers, is an Australian rules football and netball club based in the residential suburb of Grovedale, Victoria. The Grovedale teams currently play in the Geelong Football Netball League. The club's home ground is Burdoo Reserve.

== Club history ==
=== Origins ===
The club was originally named Germantown. The earliest record found of the Germantown Football Club is a Geelong Advertiser article published on 16/05/1893 giving details of a match with Winchelsea. On 09/04/1908 - the Germantown Football Club decided to create their seconds team who won the Grand Final in 1909.

On the 30/03/1911 - “It was unanimously decided to change the name of the Germantown Football Club to SOUTH BARWON, as this covers more of the ground where players reside” (Published 01/04/1911, Geelong Advertiser).

In 1915 due to World War I the township of Germantown was changed by the local council to Grovedale after a local homestead.

In 1920 Grovedale formed a football side. They put themselves in the Freshwater Creek DFA, which is no longer running. In 1923 they made the "Grand Final" against Belmont now known as Sth Barwon; they lost the game by 16 points. In 1925, they made another Grand Final, in which they played Barrabool, but again they lost the game.

=== Reformation ===
In 1948 known as Marshall they entered into the Geelong & DFL, a division that was called the Jarman Cup, and in 1956 they wanted to expand into neighbouring areas so they renamed themselves Marshall-Grovedale. In 1963 they made the Jarman Cup where they played against Leopold; they won by 27 points. The following year they were promoted to the Woolworth Cup division. In 1970 they changed their name to Grovedale Football Club.

=== 1970s ===
In 1973 the GDFL had a restructure that insisted in having the senior club also provide a reserve grade side. This meant that senior clubs had to align with a junior club to survive. They had to make two divisions because there were so many teams, so the club went into Division 2. Between 1973 and 1976 Grovedale played in every Grand Final where they played Modewarre. In 1973 they lost by 19 points, and in 1974 they lost again, this time by 25 points. In 1975 they won by five points. The following season Modewarre defeated them by 21 points. In 1978 they were promoted to Division 1 but did not win many games that year.

=== Geelong Football League ===
In 1979 the Geelong Football League was formed and Grovedale was one of the founding clubs. In the following 42 years the club has made the finals on seven occasions. Their best season was in 2013 when they were runners-up.

Notable past player Timothy Colbert controversially left the club in 2015 to play for the Anglesea Kangaroos in the Bellarine Football League (BFL). At the conclusion of the 2015 Bellarine season, Colbert when asked by Anglesea team mates if he will play for another club stated, “If I player anywhere, it’ll be Anglesea.” After having a year off football in 2016, Colbert returned to Grovedale Tigers in 2017.

== VFL/AFL players ==
- David Bolton
- Kent Butcher
- Shane Crothers
- Adam Donohue
- Craig Evans
- Daniel Fletcher
- Simon Fletcher
- David Mensch
- Matthew Primus
- Luke Delaney
- Cameron Delaney
- Michael Schulze
- Ryan Abbott
- Gryan Miers
- James Tsitas
- Cooper Whyte
- Mitchell Knevitt

== Bibliography ==
- Cat Country: History of Football In The Geelong Region - John Stoward - ISBN 978-0-9577515-8-3
