= Garry Johns =

Australian rules footballer

Personal information
- Born: 28 October 1964 (age 62)
- Original team: Barwon
- Height: 185 cm (6 ft 1 in)
- Weight: 80 kg (176 lb)

Playing career^{1}
Years	Club	Games (Goals)
1984	Geelong	2 (0)
- ^{1} Playing statistics correct to the end of 1984.

Garry Johns (born 28 October 1964) is a former Australian rules footballer who played with Geelong in the Victorian Football League (VFL).

Johns, originally a Barwon player, represented Geelong in Under 19s football before breaking into the senior side in the 1984 VFL season. He debuted in Geelong's round five win over St Kilda at Moorabbin Oval and made his only other league appearance the following week, against Melbourne at the Melbourne Cricket Ground.
