= Shane Crothers =

Australian rules footballer and basketball player

Personal information
- Full name: Shane Crothers
- Born: 2 July 1973 (age 53)
- Original team: Grovedale (GFL)
- Draft: 34th overall, 1993 Pre-Season draft
- Height: 198 cm (6 ft 6 in)
- Weight: 97 kg (214 lb)

Playing career^{1}
Years	Club	Games (Goals)
1994–1995	Geelong	4 (0)
1996–1997	Port Adelaide SANFL	15
- ^{1} Playing statistics correct to the end of 1995.

Career highlights
- Port Adelaide (SANFL) Premiership Player (1996)

Shane Crothers (born 2 July 1973) is an Australian basketball player and former Australian rules footballer. He played with the Geelong Football Club in the Australian Football League (AFL), Port Adelaide in the SANFL and Geelong Supercats in the National Basketball League (NBL).

Crothers was drafted by Geelong from Geelong Football League club Grovedale with the 113th pick of the 1989 VFL draft. Unable to break into the team, Crothers joined the Geelong Supercats and made his NBL debut in 1991, playing in a side which included a young Shane Heal. He also played NBL in 1992 but left the following year when he was again drafted by Geelong to the AFL.

His AFL career consisted of just four games but he was a part of a strong team which made and lost the Grand Final in both seasons he was at the club; 1994 and 1995. Playing as a ruckman, Crothers had seven hit-outs and seven disposals on his league debut, against North Melbourne late in the 1994 AFL season. He played again the following round in a win over Fitzroy but didn't participate in the finals. His appearances in 1995 were limited to games against Collingwood and Richmond, the latter at the Melbourne Cricket Ground.

Crothers had become the second person, after Michael Parsons, to compete in both leagues.

After leaving the Cats, Crothers joined the Port Adelaide Football Club in 1996 and was named on the interchange bench in the Magpies' premiership win over Central District.

He also returned to basketball and competed with the West Adelaide Bearcats in the Central Australian Basketball League.
