= West Oval =

Sports venue in North Geelong, Victoria

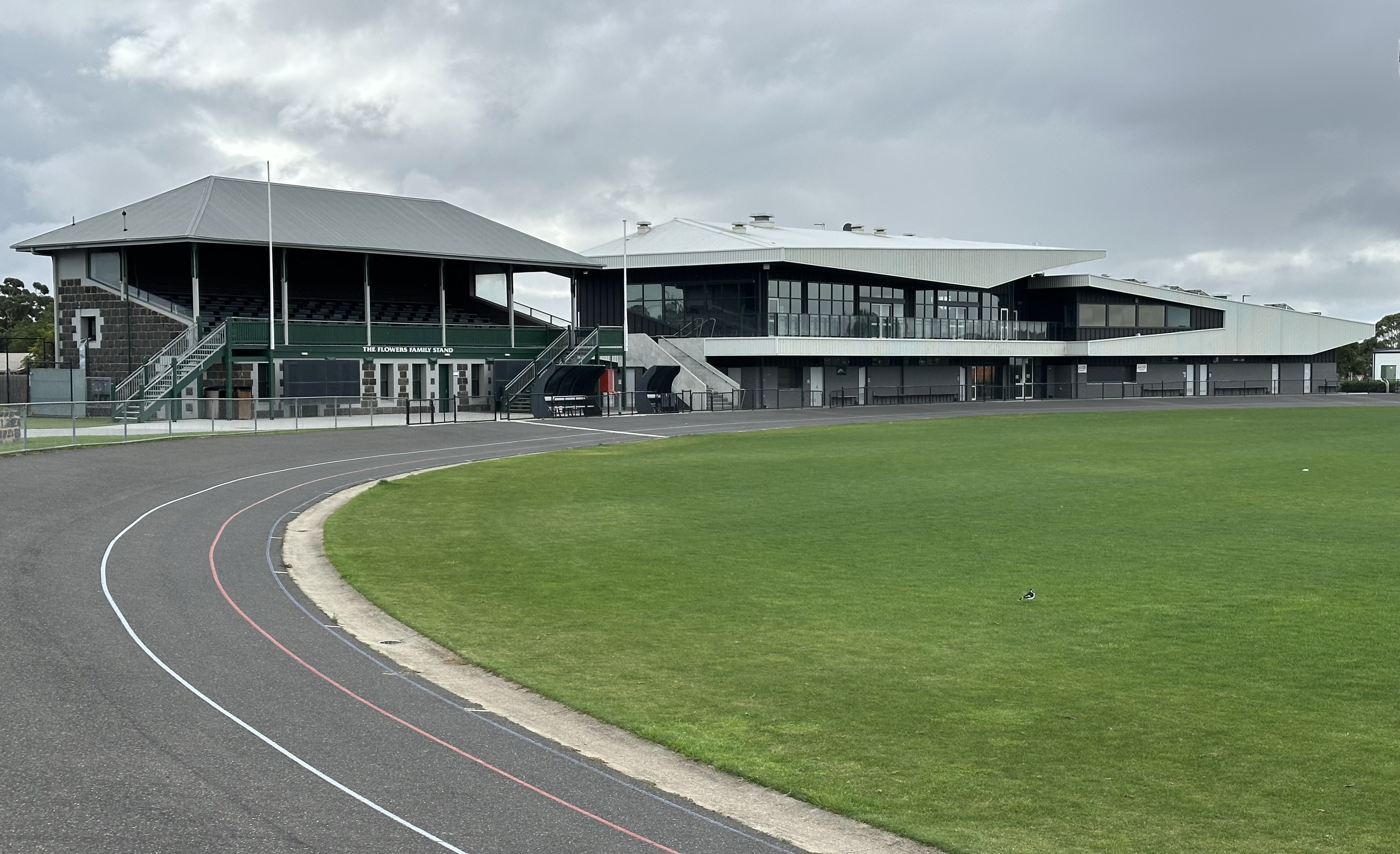
- West Oval in April 2026
- Interactive map of West Oval
- Address: 66-76 Church St; North Geelong, Victoria
- Coordinates: 38.13016°S 144.34585°E
- Record attendance: 12,000 (Geelong West vs Caulfield, 11 June 1972)

Construction
- Opened: 1890s; 135 years ago
- Cost: A$11,000,000 (redevelopment)

Tenants
- Geelong West Giants (GFNL/GDFNL); Geelong Cricket Club (GCA)

West Oval (known under naming rights as Scaada Stadium and sometimes referred to as Western Oval or Geelong West Oval) is an Australian rules football and cricket venue located in the Victorian suburb of North Geelong.

According to the Geelong Advertiser, the ground is "generally considered the second marquee sporting field" in the Geelong region (after Kardinia Park). It was home to two Victorian Football Association (VFA) clubs – Geelong Association and Geelong West – during the 20th century.

As of 2026, it is home to the Geelong West Giants and the Geelong Cricket Club. The ground's main oval is surrounded by a velodrome, which was opened in 1926, with two netball courts and an informal basketball area also located in the reserve.

== History ==
West Oval was used for local Australian rules football matches in the 1900s and the 1910s, including the 1913 grand final in the Geelong District Football Association (GDFA). In 1926, VFA club Geelong Association moved from Kardinia Park – which it had been sharing with Victorian Football League (VFL) club Geelong – to West Oval. The VFA club struggled, with its final home match attracting a recorded crowd of only 150 people, and it folded at the end of the 1927 season.

The Geelong West Football Club (nicknamed the "Roosters") played at West Oval from its earliest seasons in local competitions, remaining at the ground when it joined the VFA in 1963. A record crowd was achieved at the ground in round 9 of the 1972 Division 2 season, with around 12,000 people watching the Roosters defeat Caulfield by four points. During the 1975 season, the Roosters – who won their only VFA Division 1 premiership the same year – again attracted crowds of 12,000, rivalling VFL club Geelong's crowds of 13,000 at some matches. The ground also hosted some Victorian Amateur Football Association (VAFA) finals matches during the 1970s.

In January 2016, a deliberately-lit fire damaged the heritage-listed Flowers Family Stand and timekeepers' box.

Because of a lack of available change rooms at Kardinia Park during its redevelopment, West Oval was chosen to host the Geelong Football Netball League (GFNL) finals in 2021. This ultimately did not occur because the season was curtailed due to the impact of the COVID-19 pandemic.

AFL Barwon rated the ground 97 out of 118 in 2020.

On 10 April 2026, West Oval was renamed to Scaada Stadium under a naming rights agreement with environmental consultancy business Scaada.

=== Redevelopment ===
By 2015, West Oval was regarded as having some of the worst facilities of all football venues in the Geelong region, and coaches of several clubs considered the surface of the oval "too hard". In June 2017, the Greater Geelong City Council commissioned a master plan to examine developing and improving the venue, which was released in November 2018.

During the 2018 Victorian state election campaign, the Labor Party committed to funding which would assist in the redevelopment of West Oval. Construction works began during the cancelled 2020 season with the support of the Greater Geelong City Council and the Victorian Government. The upgrades included a new two-storey pavilion, resurfacing of the existing netball courts, a new scoreboard, formalised car parking, and the refurbishment of the Flowers Family Stand.

The redevelopment was completed in 2021, making West Oval capable of hosting AFL Women's (AFLW), Victorian Football League (VFL) and VFL Women's (VFLW) matches.
