= Aaron Greaves =

Australian rules footballer and coach

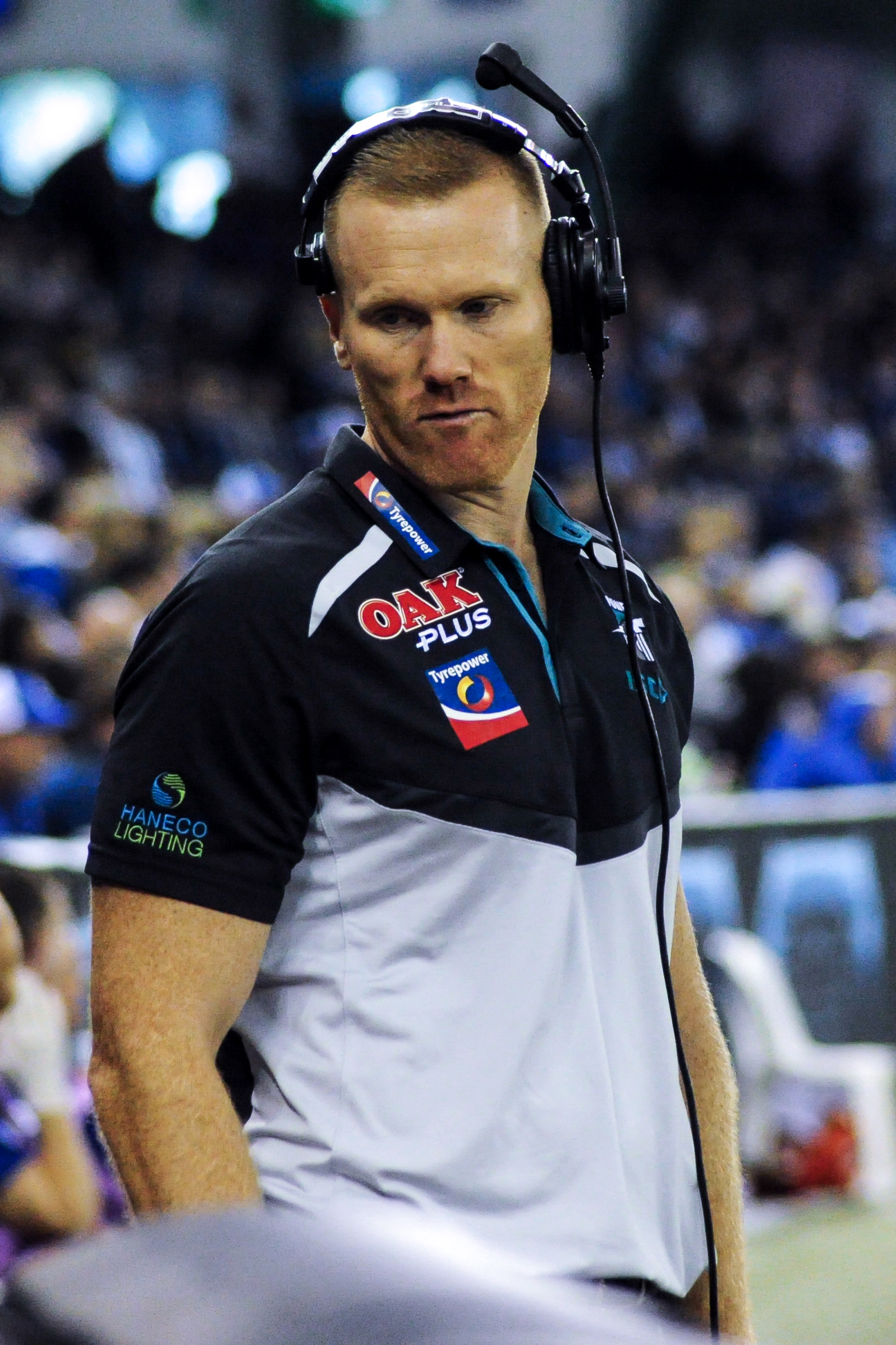
- Greaves in April 2018

Personal information
- Born: 20 November 1977 (age 47)

Aaron Greaves (born 20 November 1977) is a former Australian rules footballer who played for the Geelong Football Club and North Ballarat Football Club in the Victorian Football League (VFL). As of 2025, he was appointed in a coaching and leadership role at the Manly Warringah Sea Eagles in the National Rugby League.

Previously he has held coaching positions with Melbourne, Port Adelaide, North Melbourne, and Carlton in the Australian Football League (AFL).

== Career ==
A qualified school teacher, following the end of his playing career, Greaves was a coach of the Geelong Falcons from 2010 to 2011 in the TAC Cup. He had started his coaching career with Leopold in the Geelong Football League and had worked at the Victorian Institute of Sport. He was then appointed as an assistant midfield coach under Mark Neeld at the Melbourne Football Club ahead of the 2012 AFL season.

Greaves joined Port Adelaide at the end of 2013 AFL season in a coaching development role responsible for the club's ruck division. He would hold a variety of roles at Port Adelaide, before joining North Melbourne as the head of player development at the end of the 2018 AFL season.

He left North Melbourne following the 2019 AFL season, joining the AFL as an umpires coach from 2019 to 2021. Greaves then joined Carlton at the end of 2021 as the club's coaching and innovation manager, spending four years at the club then Greaves departed the Carlton Football Club at the end of the 2025 AFL season.

In October 2025, Greaves moved to Sydney after he was appointed in a coaching and leadership role at the Manly Warringah Sea Eagles in the National Rugby League.
