= Tom Hardiman =

Australian rules footballer (1882–1967)

Personal information
- Full name: Thomas Hardiman
- Born: 30 November 1882; Geelong, Victoria
- Died: 30 July 1967 (aged 84); Chilwell, Victoria
- Original team: Port Melbourne / Chilwell
- Height: 180 cm (5 ft 11 in)

Playing career^{1}
Years	Club	Games (Goals)
1907–1908	Geelong	31 (39)
- ^{1} Playing statistics correct to the end of 1908.

Tom Hardiman (30 November 1882 – 30 July 1967) was an Australian rules footballer who played with Geelong in the Victorian Football League (VFL). He was also known as "Ranji" Hardiman.

== Career ==
Hardiman played a season in the Victorian Football Association (VFA) with Port Melbourne in 1902, but was at Chilwell when he was recruited by Geelong, in the 1907 VFL season.

A forward, Hardiman kicked 14 goals from 13 appearances for Geelong in 1907. He had a better season in 1908 when he was Geelong's leading goalkicker with 25 goals and played in all 18 games.

He returned to the VFA in 1909 and played for the Brighton Football Club, then went back to Chilwell in 1910, as club captain.
