= North Shore Football Club =

North Shore Football Club may refer to

- North Shore Football Club (GFL), an Australian rules football club in the Geelong Football League
- North Shore Australian Football Club, an Australian rules football club in the Sydney AFL
- Northshore Jets Australian Football Club, an Australian rules football club on the Sunshine Coast, Queensland
- North Shore United, an association football club in Auckland, New Zealand
