= Rod Stokes =

Australian rules footballer (born 1952)

Personal information
- Full name: Rod Stokes
- Born: 14 July 1952 (age 74)
- Original team: St Albans

Playing career^{1}
| Years | Club | Games (Goals) |
| 1971 — 1972 | Geelong | 10 (1) |
- ^{1} Playing statistics correct to the end of 1972.

Rod Stokes (born 14 July 1952) is a former Australian rules footballer who played for Geelong in the Victorian Football League (now known as the Australian Football League).
