= Ryan Abbott =

Australian rules footballer

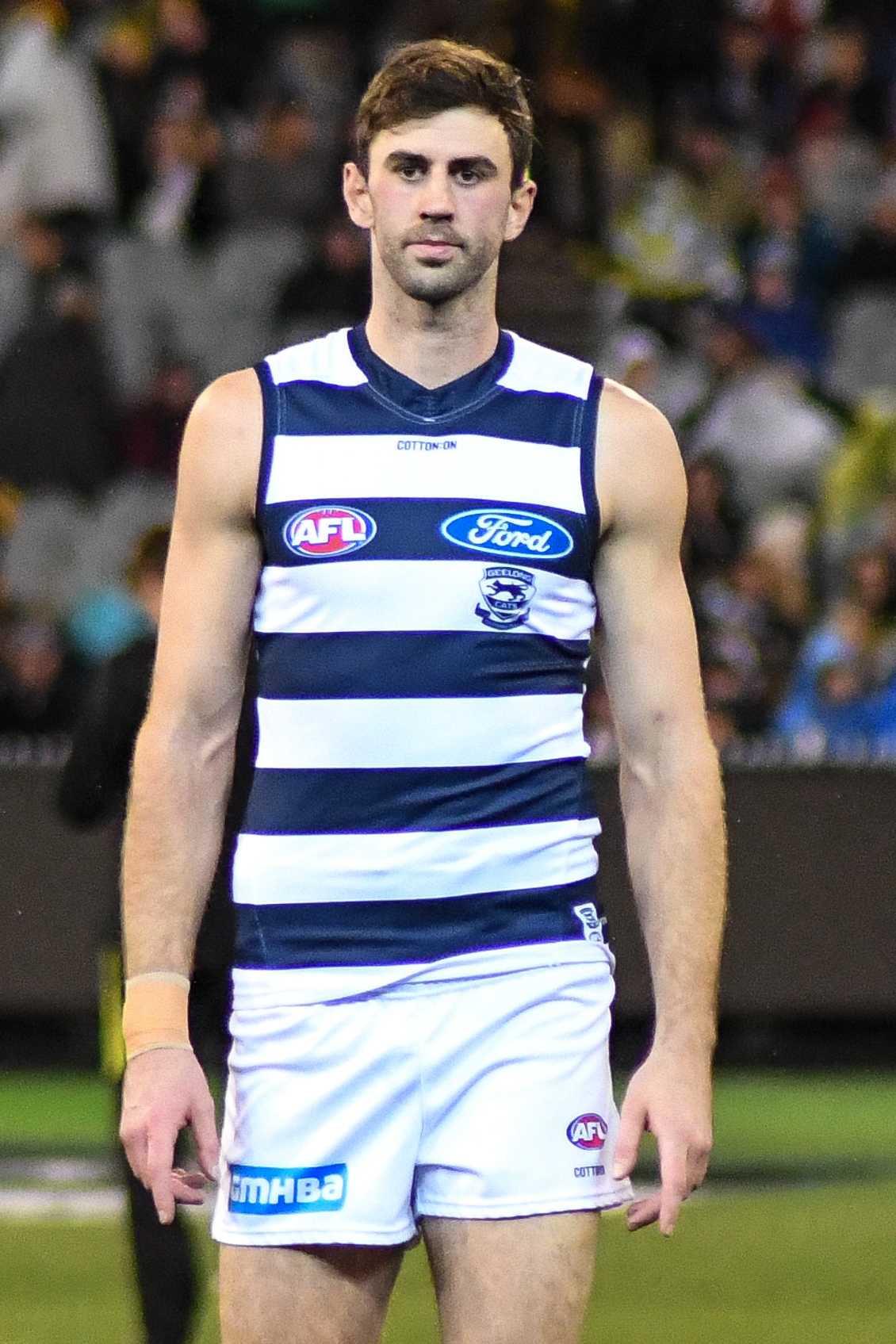
- Abbott playing for Geelong in August 2018

Personal information
- Born: 25 June 1991 (age 35)
- Original team: Grovedale Tigers
- Draft: No. 69, 2016 national draft
- Debut: 3 August 2018, Geelong vs. Richmond, at the MCG
- Height: 200 cm (6 ft 7 in)
- Weight: 100 kg (220 lb)
- Position: Ruckman

Club information
- Current club: St Kilda
- Number: 27

Playing career^{1}
Years	Club	Games (Goals)
2018–2019	Geelong	5 (4)
2020	St Kilda	1 (1)
Total		6 (5)
- ^{1} Playing statistics correct to the end of 2020.

Ryan Abbott (born 25 June 1991) is a former professional Australian rules footballer playing for Geelong and St Kilda in the Australian Football League (AFL).

Abbott is from Grovedale, Victoria. He played basketball from 14 and continued until 21. Abbott later played for the Grovedale Tigers in the Geelong Football League, winning consecutive best and fairests. He also played for Geelong's Victorian Football League (VFL) side, performing well against Jake Spencer, an AFL-listed ruckman for Melbourne. Abbott was selected by Geelong with pick 69 in the 2016 national draft. He fractured his leg in a marking contest at training, which was expected to sideline him until January 2017. Abbott returned, but suffered a stress fracture in his back. He played 15 VFL games in 2017 and came seventh in Geelong's VFL best and fairest. In 2018, Abbott was selected for his AFL debut in round 20 against Richmond at the Melbourne Cricket Ground. He matched up with Toby Nankervis, recording 22 hitouts and two goals.

He was delisted by Geelong at the conclusion of the 2019 AFL season, but was subsequently signed as a delisted free agent by St Kilda. He was then delisted by St Kilda at the conclusion of the 2020 AFL season after playing just 1 game for them.
