= Jan Smith (footballer) =

Australian rules footballer

Personal information
- Born: 26 May 1956 (age 70)
- Original team: North Shore / Geelong West
- Height: 191 cm (6 ft 3 in)
- Weight: 89 kg (196 lb)

Playing career^{1}
Years	Club	Games (Goals)
1980	Geelong	2 (0)
1982	Fitzroy	7 (1)
Total		9 (1)
- ^{1} Playing statistics correct to the end of 1982.

Jan Smith (born 26 May 1956) is a former Australian rules footballer who played with Geelong and Fitzroy in the Victorian Football League (VFL).

Smith, a defender, played his early football at North Shore, before joining Geelong West in the Victorian Football Association. He was a regular in the Geelong West team of the late 1970s, often at full-back, and a VFA representative in 1979.

His debut for Geelong came in the final home and away round of the 1980 VFL season, against Footscray at Waverley Park. Smith had 20 disposals. He next played in Geelong's four point preliminary final loss to Collingwood. Although he missed a grand final, Smith did get to play in Geelong's 1980 reserves premiership team. He played in another reserves premiership in 1981, but didn't make a senior appearance all year. In 1982 he went to Fitzroy, where he played seven senior games.

He returned to Geelong West once his VFL career came to an end, then in 1985 was appointed coach of North Shore.
