= Ron Lunn =

Australian rules footballer

Personal information
- Full name: Ron Lunn
- Born: 7 May 1929
- Died: 20 August 1987 (aged 58)
- Original team: Drysdale
- Height: 180 cm (5 ft 11 in)
- Weight: 81 kg (179 lb)

Playing career^{1}
Years	Club	Games (Goals)
1948–1950	Geelong	39 (6)
1951–1952	Essendon	28 (3)
Total		67 (9)
- ^{1} Playing statistics correct to the end of 1952.

Ron Lunn (7 May 1929 – 20 August 1987) was an Australian rules footballer who played for Geelong and Essendon over five seasons in the Victorian Football League (VFL).

His son, Stephen Lunn, was also an Australian rules footballer for Geelong and Footscray.
