= Greg Sizer =

Australian rules footballer (1965–2021)

Personal information
- Full name: Gregory Sizer
- Born: 13 August 1965
- Died: 27 June 2021 (aged 55); Woodsdale, Tasmania
- Original team: Belmont (GDFL)
- Height: 183 cm (6 ft 0 in)
- Weight: 83 kg (183 lb)

Playing career^{1}
Years	Club	Games (Goals)
1986–1987	Melbourne	1 (1)
- ^{1} Playing statistics correct to the end of 1986.

Gregory Sizer (13 August 1965 – 27 June 2021) was an Australian rules footballer who played with Melbourne in the Victorian Football League (VFL).

Originally from Geelong, Sizer joined Victorian Football Association club Geelong West in the 1980s. In 1986, he was recruited to the Victorian Football League by Melbourne, where he played primarily in the reserves and played a single senior game at the end of the year. He was offered the Melbourne reserves captaincy in 1987, but turned it down in search for more senior opportunities, and was cleared to Richmond, but he did not play a senior game there.

Sizer was also a golfer, and after leaving the Richmond Football Club he spent a year caddying at the Augusta Golf Club in 1988–89. He later played senior football for Werribee in the VFA in 1989 and 1990.

Sizer died in 2021, aged 55.
