= Harvey Davis =

Australian rules footballer

Personal information
- Full name: Harvey Davis
- Born: 4 March 1953 (age 73)
- Original team: Newtown & Chilwell

Playing career^{1}
| Years | Club | Games (Goals) |
| 1973–1977 | Geelong | 44 (5) |
- ^{1} Playing statistics correct to the end of 1977.

Harvey Davis (born 4 March 1953) is a former Australian rules footballer who played for Geelong in the Victorian Football League (now known as the Australian Football League).
