= Newtown & Chilwell Football Club =

Newtown & Chilwell

Names
- Full name: Newtown & Chilwell Football Netball Club
- Nickname: Eagles

Club details
- Founded: 1934; 92 years ago
- Colours
- President: Aaron Keating
- Coach: Steve Johnson
- Premierships: (9): 1937, 1962, 1963, 1964, 1965, 1978, 1982, 1985, 1986
- Ground: Elderslie Reserve

Uniforms
Home

Newtown & Chilwell Sporting Club, nicknamed the Eagles, is an Australian rules football and netball club based in the inner western suburb of Newtown, Victoria.

The club teams currently compete in the regional Geelong Football Netball League, playing their home games at Elderslie Reserve.

== History ==
Chilwell Football Club (formed 1874) and Newtown Football Club (formed 1874/1875) were affiliated with the following leagues:

- Geelong District Football Association (GDFA), 1879–1918
- Geelong District Football League (GDFL), 1919–1921
- Geelong Junior Football Association (GJFA), 1922–1932
- Geelong District Football League (GDFL), 1933

In 1933 the Newtown Football Club and the Chilwell Football Club merged to form the Newtown & Chilwell Football Club their first season was 1934. The merger of two of Geelong's oldest clubs was because Newtown had difficulty getting players so they looked to their neighboring club, Chilwell. The club also has a historical link to the Barwon Football Club, which at its peak in the mid-1870s was one of the strongest clubs in Victoria, before it merged into Chilwell in 1879.

When the league was formed in 1979 the Eagles were one of the 10 clubs that broke away from the Geelong & District Football League. The city and country clubs of the old GDFL were divided into the major league competition of the GFL and the minor league GDFL.

== VFL/AFL players ==
- Bert Rankin - Geelong
- Cliff Rankin - Geelong
- Harry Marsham - Geelong
- Jack Grant - Geelong
- Joseph Bailey - Geelong
- Noel Rayson - Geelong, South Melbourne
- Hugh Strahan - Geelong
- Harvey Davis - Geelong
- Stephen Lunn - Geelong
- Basil Flynn - Geelong
- Brendan McCartney (coach) - Western Bulldogs
- Will Schofield - West Coast
- Alex Cincotta - Carlton
- Tanner Bruhn - Greater Western Sydney/Geelong

== Bibliography ==
- Stoward, John (2008). Cat Country – History of Football in the Geelong Region. ISBN 978-0-9577515-8-3.
