= Geelong West St Peters Football Club =

Geelong West St Peters

Names
- Full name: Geelong West St Peters Football Club
- Nickname(s): Roosters, Red West

Club details
- Founded: 1878; 148 years ago
- Dissolved: 2016; 10 years ago
- Colours: White Red
- Competition: Geelong Football League; Victorian Football Association; Ballarat Football League
- Ground: West Oval

Uniforms
Home

The Geelong West St Peters Football Club, nicknamed the Roosters, was an Australian rules football club that last competed in the Geelong Football League (GFL) from 1989 until the end of the 2016 season.

Prior to its merger with St Peters Football Club in 1989, the club played in the Victorian Football Association (VFA) from 1963 until 1988.

At the conclusion of the 2016 GFL season, the Roosters merged with co-tenants Geelong West Sports Club to form a new club, Geelong West Giants.

== History ==
Formed in 1878, Geelong West began in the Geelong & District Football Association. The club with its red jumper and white monogram was distinct from the similarly named Geelong West Cricket & Football Club who wore a blue and white jumper – giving rise to local nicknames Red West and Blue West for the two clubs respectively. The Roosters and were a consistently strong club winning 25 premierships by 1945.

In 1946 the club joined the Ballarat Football League. Premiership success followed in the BFL, with the club winning four premierships in a row from 1956 to 1959. The Ballarat-based clubs in the BFL grew to dislike Geelong West's presence in their league, as it meant long travelling distances for away games, and weaker crowds for home games; and after 1962, the BFL was keen for Geelong West to leave. At the same time the Victorian Football Association was looking to expand, so the two agreed for Geelong West to join the VFA second division in 1963.

The club had to change its jumper as it clashed with the Preston Bullants, so reversed its colours to a white jumper with a red GWFC monogram. In their inaugural season they only missed out on the wooden spoon by percentage but took out the premiership the following year, thus earning promotion to the first division. Geelong West only spent one season at the top league before being demoted again, but reached the next three Grand Finals, losing in 1966 and 1967, then winning in 1968 to be promoted for the second time.

Once again, the club wasn't strong enough to compete in the first division, lasting three seasons before being relegated, but things changed in the 1970s. The club won its third premiership in 1972, completing a perfect season by winning all twenty games it played, to be promoted back to the first division. On that occasion, they deserved to be competing amongst the best teams and, in 1975, under the coaching of Bill Goggin, Geelong West claimed a surprise first division premiership by defeating Dandenong in the VFA Grand Final.

By the time the 1980s came around, the football club had run up a large debt that it struggled to manage. There was a significant reduction in support from the local community, in large part because there was strong growth of the Geelong Football League throughout the mid-1980s, which pushed player salaries up and attracted local sponsorship away from the club. There became a shortage of quality players willing to travel to Melbourne every second week, particularly at the Under-19 level, which led to the club's onfield position deteriorating through the 1980s. Faced with those problems, the club withdrew from the VFA after the 1988 season.

During the summer of 1988–89, the club agreed to a merger with the St Peters Football Club. The merged club was called Geelong West St Peters Football Club. The St Peters club had a strong junior development that Geelong West didn't have, but Geelong West had a ground with facilities that St Peters lacked.

St Peters first entered a senior side in 1959 in the Evelyn Hurst Cup. The club was also one of the twelve clubs that broke away and founded the GFL. In 1980, when the GFL was reduced from 12 club to ten, St Peters were demoted to the GDFL. Their time in the GDFL was brief, but they won the premiership in both years: 1980 and 1981. In fact, the club didn't lose a game in those two years, the closest to a loss being a drawn game in 1980. The club was promoted into the GFL in 1982 and stayed until the merger in 1989.

The new club entered the Geelong Football League but progress was slow, and the team were wooden spooners in their second year. From 1992 to 1996, they played as West Saints and, in 1996, they unsuccessfully played off for the premiership. In 1997, they club reverted to the name Geelong West St Peters.

The club made the finals four times and were wooden spooners twice during their 28 years in the GFL.

== Honours ==
Premierships
Competition	Level	Wins	Years won
Victorian Football Association	Seniors (Division 1)	1	1975
Victorian Football Association	Seniors (Division 2)	2	1964, 1968, 1972
Ballarat Football League	Division 1	4	1956, 1957, 1958, 1959
Geelong and District Football Association	Division 1	25	1880, 1882, 1884, 1885, 1887, 1889, 1890, 1892, 1894, 1896, 1909, 1914, 1915, 1927, 1931, 1932, 1933, 1934, 1935, 1936, 1938, 1945

== VFA club records ==
Highest Score	37.27 (249) v Waverley, Round 8, 1983, West Oval
Lowest Score	2.4 (16) v Waverley, Round 17, 1965, Central Reserve
Greatest Winning Margin	204 points v Waverley, Round 8, 1983, West Oval
Greatest Losing Margin	158 points v Sandringham, Round 3, 1981, Beach Road Oval
Lowest Winning Score	6.12 (48) v Camberwell 6.8 (44), Round 10, 1964, West Oval
Highest Losing Score	24.15 (159) v Camberwell 27.15 (177), Round 2, 1988, Camberwell Sports Ground

Geelong West also holds the record for the greatest losing margin in Australian rules football, in any league and at any grade, with a 675-point loss against Williamstown in a 1983 thirds division match.

== VFL/AFL players ==
- Les Bailiff – Geelong
- Jack Baker Jr – Geelong
- Bill Benyon – Geelong
- Terry Bright – Geelong
- Ricky Browne – Geelong
- Charlie Coles – Geelong
- Rex Deeath – Geelong
- Maurie Gear – Geelong
- Norm Glenister – Geelong
- Tom Grundell – Geelong
- Bert Hall – Geelong
- David Harris – Geelong
- Leo Healy – Geelong
- Jim Kearney – Geelong
- Bill James – Geelong
- Alex King – Geelong
- Michael Kol – Geelong
- Nigel Kol – Geelong, Melbourne
- Stephen Lunn – Geelong, Footscray
- Bill McKinley – Geelong
- Glen Middlemiss – Geelong
- Bill Moodie – Geelong, South Melbourne
- Ernest Newling – Geelong
- Jack Plunkett – Geelong
- Greg Sizer – Melbourne
- Peter Riccardi – Geelong
- Charlie Ricketts – South Melbourne, Richmond, St Kilda
- Les Roebuck – Geelong
- Jan Smith – Geelong
- Archie Sykes – Essendon
- Neil Tucker – Geelong, Carlton
- Nicholas Walsh – Essendon
- Tony Walsh – Geelong, Carlton
- Ron Watts – Geelong
- Jack Williams – Geelong
- Jim Wills – Geelong
- Henry Young – Geelong
