= Fred Lynch =

Australian rules footballer

Personal information
- Full name: Frederick T. Lynch
- Born: 10 May 1936
- Original team: Coragulac
- Height: 182 cm (6 ft 0 in)
- Weight: 85 kg (187 lb)

Playing career^{1}
Years	Club	Games (Goals)
1956	Essendon	6 (0)
- ^{1} Playing statistics correct to the end of 1956.

Frederick "Fred" Lynch (born 10 May 1936) is a former Australian rules footballer who played with Essendon in the Victorian Football League (VFL).

Lynch appeared in six of the opening eight rounds of the 1956 VFL season, while on permit from Coragulac. He wasn't able to fully commit to Essendon due to his farm work and chose to remain in the Hampden Football League. A half back flanker, he played briefly for Colac, before returning to Coragulac in 1959. He won the Maskell Medal in 1961.

His son, Paul Lynch, played for Geelong from 1993 to 2000.
