= Craig Evans (Australian footballer) =

Australian rules footballer

Personal information
- Full name: Craig Evans
- Born: 26 February 1965 (age 61)
- Original team: Grovedale
- Height: 175 cm (5 ft 9 in)
- Weight: 72 kg (159 lb)

Playing career^{1}
| Years | Club | Games (Goals) |
| 1986 | Geelong | 9 (6) |
| 1987 | Brisbane Bears | 2 (2) |
| Total | | 11 (8) |
- ^{1} Playing statistics correct to the end of 1987.

Craig Evans (born 26 February 1965) is a former Australian rules footballer who played for Geelong and the Brisbane Bears in the Victorian Football League (VFL).

Evans was a local Geelong recruit, from the Grovedale Football Club. He appeared in nine games for Geelong during the 1986 VFL season and was then one of the players offered up by the club to the Brisbane Bears.

At Brisbane for their inaugural league season, Evans had to wait until round 11 to play his first game. He made his debut for the Bears in a fixture against Hawthorn at Carrara Oval and he kicked two goals. The following week he played in a loss to Essendon, in what would be his last VFL game.
