= Nigel Kol =

Australian rules footballer

Personal information
- Full name: Nigel Kol
- Born: 1 January 1962 (age 64)
- Original team: Lara (GFL)
- Height: 183 cm (6 ft 0 in)
- Weight: 70 kg (154 lb)

Playing career^{1}
Years	Club	Games (Goals)
1983	Geelong	2 (0)
1985–1987	Melbourne	28 (13)
Total		30 (13)
- ^{1} Playing statistics correct to the end of 1987.

Nigel Kol (born 1 January 1962) is a former Australian rules footballer who played with Geelong and Melbourne in the Victorian Football League (VFL).

Originally from Geelong Football League club Lara, Kol made his senior VFL debut for Geelong in the 1983 VFL season, one of them with his identical twin brother Michael.

After failing to play a senior game in 1984, Kol made his way to Melbourne and played nine games for his new club in the second half of the 1985 VFL season. He was then a regular member of the side in 1986, featuring in 17 of a possible 22 games. Although Michael Kol was still playing at Geelong during this time, the brothers never had to play against each other as one was invariably never picked whenever Geelong and Melbourne met.

When his league career ended, Kol and his brother moved to Warrnambool where they ran a hotel together. He continued playing in the Hampden Football League with South Warrnambool and was a member of premiership teams in 1990 and 1991. Later, in 2010, he returned to South Warrnambool as senior coach. He had also been coach of Warrnambool Football Club, in 2005 and 2006.
