= Mario Bortolotto =

Australian rules footballer (1957–2022)

Personal information
- Born: 26 June 1957
- Died: 9 September 2022 (aged 65)
- Original teams: Koondrook (MMFL) / Leopold (BFL)
- Height: 189 cm (6 ft 2 in)
- Weight: 87 kg (192 lb)

Playing career^{1}
Years	Club	Games (Goals)
1979–1980	Geelong	14 (2)
1981–1983	Carlton	30 (1)
Total		44 (3)
- ^{1} Playing statistics correct to the end of 1983.

Career highlights
- 2x VFL premiership player (1981, 1982)

Mario Bortolotto (26 June 1957 – 9 September 2022) was an Australian rules footballer who played with Geelong and Carlton in the VFL.

Bortolotto played as a defender and started his career at Geelong. He was delisted after two seasons and crossed to Carlton with whom he would be a premiership player in 1981 and 1982.
