= Michael Kol =

Australian rules footballer

Personal information
- Full name: Michael Kol
- Born: 1 January 1962 (age 64)
- Original team: Lara (GFL)
- Height: 183 cm (6 ft 0 in)
- Weight: 74 kg (163 lb)

Playing career^{1}
Years	Club	Games (Goals)
1983–1989	Geelong	63 (42)
- ^{1} Playing statistics correct to the end of 1989.

Michael Kol (born 1 January 1962) is a former Australian rules footballer who played with Geelong in the Victorian Football League (VFL) during the 1980s.

Kol played for Geelong Football League club Lara and the Geelong Under-19s before making his VFL senior debut in 1983. He kicked 22 goals from 18 games in 1983, to finish second behind Terry Bright in the club goal-kicking table. His twin brother, Nigel Kol, was also at Geelong in 1983 but they would appear together just once, against Sydney at Kardinia Park in round eight.

Kol was one of the faster players of his generation and regularly competed in the "Grand Final Sprint". He finished second, to Geoff Ablett, in the 1985 VFL Grand Final sprint.

From 1984 to 1986 Kol played less than half of Geelong's games but had a strong season in 1987, making 16 appearances and averaged 20 disposals a game. He polled seven votes in the 1987 Brownlow Medal count, with all his votes coming in four consecutive rounds.

He didn't feature at all in the 1988 VFL season and was used just three times the following year, despite playing well enough in the reserves to win the 1989 Gardiner Medal.
