= Rex Deeath =

Australian rules footballer

Personal information
- Full name: Rex Deeath
- Born: 9 March 1949 (age 77)
- Original team: Geelong West

Playing career^{1}
Years	Club	Games (Goals)
1974–1975	Geelong	13 (2)
- ^{1} Playing statistics correct to the end of 1975.

Rex Deeath (born 9 March 1949) is a former Australian rules footballer who played for Geelong in the Victorian Football League (now known as the Australian Football League). He also has 2 children Stef and Karley
