= Kevin Higgins (Australian footballer) =

Australian rules footballer (1951–2019)

Personal information
- Full name: Kevin Michael Patrick Higgins
- Born: 20 February 1951
- Died: 5 July 2019 (aged 68)
- Original team: Sandhurst (BFL)
- Height: 183 cm (6 ft 0 in)
- Weight: 89 kg (14 st 0 lb)

Playing career^{1}
Years	Club	Games (Goals)
1970–78	Geelong	128 (35)
1979–80	Fitzroy	25 (0)
Total		153 (35)
- ^{1} Playing statistics correct to the end of 1980.

Kevin Michael Patrick Higgins (20 February 1951 – 5 July 2019) was an Australian rules footballer who played for Geelong and Fitzroy in the Victorian Football League (VFL) during the 1970s.

== Career ==
Originally from Bendigo Football League club Sandhurst, Higgins made his VFL debut in the opening round of 1970 in Geelong's nine-point win over Hawthorn at Glenferrie Oval.

Higgins started his career as a forward but it was as a defender he made his name in the VFL. A left-footer, Higgins was a league regular from 1973 and made his finals debut in 1976. He was Geelong's best-placed player at the 1978 Brownlow Medal count but played the last six games in the reserves and transferred to Fitzroy for a fee of $15,000 before the 1979 season. Higgins would appear in all 24 games that season, including Fitzroy’s first finals since 1960. However, his only appearance in 1980 – Fitzroy's Round 2 loss to Melbourne – would prove to be his last game at VFL level, just before his 30th birthday.

Higgins was appointed playing coach of the Newtown and Chilwell Football Club in late 1980 as they prepared for their third season in the fledgling GFL competition.

Playing at full-forward, he kicked 100 goals twice in a season (1981 and 1982) and was the GFL leading goal-kicker in 1982 with 131, which remains the most kicked in a season in the history of the league, and included a haul of 20 in one game against North Geelong. Newtown and Chilwell finished runner-up to North Shore in 1981 and then went on to defeat reigning GDFL Division 1 premier St Peter's in 1982.

The Eagles then made three straight Grand Final appearances between 1985 and 1987, winning the first two deciders and falling just short of a hat-trick of flags when beaten by St Albans by 22 points despite having two more scoring shots.

Higgins’ final season in charge at Elderslie Reserve came in 1988, leaving him with an impressive 106–49 win-loss record from 155 games.

He was appointed coach of SANFL club Sturt in 1990 but only lasted one season with the Double Blues after they could manage just two wins on their way to the second of would become eight consecutive wooden spoons. Higgins was sacked on 30 September but had been aware he had little support.

== Educator ==
Kevin Higgins was a dedicated educator with a passion for teaching and learning. He was the youngest Catholic School principal appointed in Victoria when he took the role at the newly opened Mercia Primary School in 1976. In his later years, he was dedicated to the work of the Cotton On Foundation and their support for education programs in Uganda, Thailand and South Africa.

Higgins died on 5 July 2019. The next day, his former team Geelong wore black tape around their arms as a tribute to Higgins during a match against the Western Bulldogs.
