= Basil Flynn =

Australian rules footballer

Personal information
- Born: 6 December 1955 (age 70)
- Original team: Newtown & Chilwell
- Height: 178 cm (5 ft 10 in)
- Weight: 80 kg (176 lb)

Playing career^{1}
Years	Club	Games (Goals)
1983–1984	Geelong	6 (1)
- ^{1} Playing statistics correct to the end of 1984.

Basil Flynn (born 6 December 1955) is a former Australian rules footballer who played with Geelong in the Victorian Football League (VFL). he now lives a relaxed life in Barwon heads

Flynn was 27 when he made his first appearances for Geelong, late in the 1983 VFL season. He played in rounds 17 to 19, then lost his place in the team when Peter Featherby returned from injury. His three other league games came in 1984. He won a Mathieson Medal in 1985 while playing for Newtown & Chilwell. His contributions in Newtown & Chilwell's 1985 and 1986 Geelong Football League premiership winning teams saw him named "Best player" in both grand finals. He was captain for the 1986 premiership.
