= Tom Sherry =

Australian rules footballer

Personal information
- Full name: Thomas Matthew Sherry
- Born: 5 October 1881; Undera, Victoria
- Died: 3 August 1971 (aged 89); Tongala, Victoria
- Original team: Barwon

Playing career^{1}
Years	Club	Games (Goals)
1907	Geelong	13 (18)
- ^{1} Playing statistics correct to the end of 1907.

Thomas Matthew Sherry (5 October 1881 – 3 August 1971) was an Australian rules footballer who played with Geelong in the Victorian Football League (VFL).

== Career ==
Sherry, a recruit from Barwon, played for Geelong in the 1907 VFL season. He came into the side in round five and played in the remainder of Geelong's games that season, a total of 13 appearances. His tally of 18 goals in 1907 was enough to win Geelong's leading goalkicker award.

In 1908, Sherry applied for a clearance to the Melbourne Football Club, but it was refused. He instead made his way to Victorian Football Association club Prahran.
