= Les Roebuck =

Australian rules footballer and tennis player

Personal information
- Full name: Leslie Norman Roebuck
- Born: 10 November 1885; Geelong, Victoria
- Died: 18 May 1973 (aged 87); Surrey Hills, Victoria
- Original team: Geelong West
- Height: 168 cm (5 ft 6 in)
- Weight: 57 kg (126 lb)

Playing career^{1}
| Years | Club | Games (Goals) |
| 1905–1908 | Geelong | 35 (43) |
- ^{1} Playing statistics correct to the end of 1908.

Career highlights
- Geelong leading goalkicker: 1906

Leslie Norman "Les" Roebuck (10 November 1885 – 18 May 1973) was an Australian rules footballer who played with Geelong in the Victorian Football League (VFL). He was also a leading tennis player.

== VFL ==
Roebuck is on record as weighing only 57 kg, during his football career at Geelong, where he played for four seasons.

Recruited from Geelong West, Roebuck was Geelong's leading goalkicker in the 1906 VFL season, with 21 goals. His best goal tally in a game was five, which he got against Melbourne at Corio Oval in 1907.

== Tennis ==
Roebuck played regularly on the tennis circuit and competed at the 1914 Australasian Championships. In the opening round he defeated W. C. Marsden, then conceded a second round walkover to two-time former champion Rodney Heath, who went on to make the semi-finals.
