= Stephen Lunn =

Australian rules footballer

Personal information
- Full name: Stephen Lunn
- Born: 12 March 1956 (age 70)
- Original team: Geelong West
- Height: 180 cm (5 ft 11 in)
- Weight: 73 kg (161 lb)

Playing career^{1}
Years	Club	Games (Goals)
1980–1982	Geelong	48 (37)
1983–1984	Footscray	21 (5)
Total		69 (42)
- ^{1} Playing statistics correct to the end of 1984.

Stephen Lunn (born 12 March 1956) is a former Australian rules footballer who played for Footscray and Geelong over five seasons in the Victorian Football League (VFL).

His father, Ron Lunn, was also an Australian rules footballer for Geelong and Essendon.
