= Paul Sarah =

Australian rules footballer

Personal information
- Born: 19 December 1953 (age 72)
- Original team: East Geelong (GDFL)
- Height: 177 cm (5 ft 10 in)
- Weight: 70 kg (154 lb)

Playing career^{1}
Years	Club	Games (Goals)
1972–1980	Geelong	128 (204)
1980–1983	Richmond	37 (51)
1984–1985	St Mary's	24 (64)
1986–1987	Torquay	28 (49)
1989	Thomson	15 (42)
- ^{1} Playing statistics correct to the end of 1983.

Paul Sarah (born 19 December 1953) is a former Australian rules footballer who played as a rover and forward-pocket with the Geelong Football Club and Richmond Football Club in the VFL.

He notably kicked 255 VFL goals during his career, originally playing 128 senior games with Geelong between 1972 and 1979 and winning their Reserve's Best and Fairest in 1975, before joining Richmond in 1980 till the end of 1983.

His Richmond career is highlighted by his winning goal after the siren in 1981 for Richmond against St. Kilda at Moorabbin.
