= Bell Park Football Club =

Bell Park

Names
- Full name: Bell Park Sport & Recreation Club
- Nickname: Dragons

Club details
- Founded: 1958; 68 years ago
- Colours
- Premierships: (6) 1969, 1970, 1984, 1991, 2003, 2011
- Ground: Bell Park Recreation Reserve

Uniforms
Home

Other information
- Official website: bellparkdragons.com.au

Bell Park Sport & Recreation Club, nicknamed the Dragons, is a sports club based in Bell Park, Victoria. The club's Australian rules football and netball teams currently play in the Geelong League. Bell Park home venue is the Bell Park Recreation Reserve.

Apart from football and netball, Bell Park has a cricket team.

== History ==
In 1958 they were founded as an under 15 team, then in 1959 they also entered an under 18 side. The first senior side was fielded in 1960 in the Geelong & DFL, Jarman Cup division.

When the Geelong Football League was formed in 1979, Bell Park was one of the 10 clubs that broke away from the Geelong & District Football League. The city and country clubs of the old GDFL were divided into the major league competition of the GFL and the minor league GDFL.

In 2002, Ken Hinkley took up the role of senior coach and oversaw a premiership in 2003.

== Premierships ==
- 1969, 1970, 1984, 1991, 2003, 2011

== List of VFL / AFL listed players ==
- Nathan Saunders – Western Bulldogs
- Jimmy Bartel – Geelong
- Fraser Murphy – Carlton
- Ray Sarcevic - Geelong
- Rhys Mathieson- Brisbane Lions
- James Worpel-Hawthorn
- Jackson Sheringham-Geelong

== Bibliography ==
- Cat Country: History of Football in the Geelong Region – John Stoward – ISBN 978-0-9577515-8-3
