= Ernie Glenister =

Australian rules footballer

Personal information
- Full name: Ernest John Putman Glenister
- Born: 12 October 1873; Geelong, Victoria
- Died: 25 April 1942 (aged 68); Malvern East, Victoria

Playing career^{1}
Years	Club	Games (Goals)
1899	St Kilda	7 (0)
- ^{1} Playing statistics correct to the end of 1899.

Ernest John Putman Glenister (12 October 1873 – 25 April 1942) was an Australian rules footballer who played with St Kilda in the Victorian Football League (VFL).
