= Ray Sarcevic =

Australian rules footballer

Personal information
- Full name: Ray Sarcevic
- Born: 14 February 1964 (age 62)
- Original team: Bell Park Dragons
- Height: 183 cm (6 ft 0 in)
- Weight: 81 kg (179 lb)
- Position: Forward

Playing career^{1}
Years	Club	Games (Goals)
1984–85	Geelong	4 (0)
- ^{1} Playing statistics correct to the end of 1985.

Ray Sarcevic (born 14 February 1964) is a former Australian rules footballer who played for Geelong in the Victorian Football League (VFL) during the 1980s.

Sarcevic, recruited from North Geelong, made just four VFL appearances, three of them in 1984 and the other in 1985. He later played at Southport in the AFL Queensland competition and won a Joe Grant Medal for his performance in the 1989 Grand Final. In the same year he kicked a club record 20 goals in a game against Kedron. Sarcevic was a Queensland representative at the 1988 Adelaide Bicentennial Carnival.

In 2024 he coached Bell Park under 16’s side to a premiership win. They went the season undefeated, winning the grand final at Osborne Park.
