= Paul Lynch (footballer) =

Australian rules footballer

Personal information
- Full name: Paul Lynch
- Born: 18 October 1973 (age 53)
- Original teams: Alvie, Colac
- Height: 185 cm (6 ft 1 in)
- Weight: 87 kg (192 lb)
- Position: Midfielder / forward

Playing career^{1}
Years	Club	Games (Goals)
1993–2000	Geelong	62 (55)
- ^{1} Playing statistics correct to the end of 2000.

Paul Lynch (born 18 October 1973) is a former Australian rules footballer who played with Geelong in the Australian Football League (AFL).

Lynch was an injury-prone player due to an unusual build where the base of his back was straight instead of inverted. As a result, he suffered from back, lower leg and in particular hamstring problems.

After sporadic appearances in his first two seasons, Lynch put together 14 games in 1995, including a qualifying final. He kicked 20 goals in 1997 and had a great run of form midway through the year, polling three, two and three Brownlow Medal votes in successive weeks. However, hamstring and back injuries would see him play just 19 further games over three seasons before being de-listed. The son of former Essendon player Fred, he continued playing in the Geelong Football League after his AFL career ended.
