= Graeme McLean =

Australian rules footballer

Personal information
- Full name: Graeme Gilleain McLean
- Born: 15 September 1947
- Died: 8 May 2013 (aged 65)
- Original team: Old Scotch
- Height: 185 cm (6 ft 1 in)
- Weight: 76 kg (168 lb)

Playing career^{1}
Years	Club	Games (Goals)
1968–69	St Kilda	5 (1)
- ^{1} Playing statistics correct to the end of 1969.

Graeme Gilleain McLean (15 September 1947 – 8 May 2013) was an Australian rules footballer who played with St Kilda in the Victorian Football League (VFL).

A full forward, McLean played only five senior games for St Kilda. He played with St Kilda's reserves, and was VFL reserves leading goalkicker in 1968, with 57 goals. After leaving St Kilda, he moved to Geelong West in the Victorian Football Association, where over three years, he kicked 70, 137 and 99 goals respectively; in the second of those years, he was the Division 2 leading goalkicker as part of Geelong West's undefeated season and premiership.
