= John Ellis (footballer) =

Australian rules footballer

Personal information
- Full name: John R. Ellis
- Born: 20 September 1948 (age 78)
- Original team: Keilor
- Height: 183 cm (6 ft 0 in)
- Weight: 89 kg (196 lb)

Playing career^{1}
Years	Club	Games (Goals)
1967–1971	Essendon	44 (43)
- ^{1} Playing statistics correct to the end of 1971.

John Ellis (born 20 September 1948) is a former Australian rules footballer who played with Essendon in the Victorian Football League (VFL).

Ellis spent some time in the Essendon reserves, after coming to the club from Keilor.

He made just four senior appearances in 1967 but didn't miss a game in 1968, playing all 20 home and away fixtures and three finals. In the 1968 VFL Grand Final, which Essendon lost, Ellis played as a centreman. He kicked 23 goals during 1968 season and also polled well in the Brownlow Medal, with eight votes, the second most by an Essendon player.

Essendon cut Ellis from their list during the 1971 season after failing to have much of an impact in the previous three seasons. He had missed a lot of football in 1969 due to a serious knee injury and was unable to recapture the form he showed in 1968.

After playing briefly for the Footscray reserves in 1971, Ellis ended the year with WANFL club Perth.

Ellis made a total of 40 appearances for Perth and then, in 1974, went to Queensland, where he captain-coached Sandgate. He led them to the 1974 QAFL premiership and in 1976 he finished second in the Grogan Medal.

He spent the 1977 season with Cooee in Tasmania, meaning he had played at highest level in four different states.

In 1978 was appointed captain-coach of Dandenong in the Victorian Football Association and steered them to fourth position on the ladder.

He joined Watsonia in 1979 and won that year's Frank Smith Medal, as the "Best and Fairest" player in the Diamond Valley Football League.
