= South Barwon Football Club =

South Barwon

Names
- Full name: South Barwon Football Netball Club
- Nickname: Swans

Club details
- Founded: 1990; 36 years ago (Note: Because of the merger of Belmont FC and Barwon FC.)
- Colours
- President: Tim Sherman
- Coach: Mark Neeld
- Ground: McDonalds Reserve

Uniforms
Home

Other information
- Official website: southbarwonfnc.com

South Barwon Football & Netball Club, nicknamed the Swans, is an Australian rules football and netball club based in the southern suburb of Belmont, Victoria. The South Barwon teams currently compete in the Geelong Football Netball League, the major regional league in the region.

== History ==
The club was formed from the Belmont Football Club and Barwon Football Club. These two clubs merged in 1990 to create the South Barwon Swans, and are now one of the largest clubs in country Victoria.

South Barwon has won eight premierships to date, their first in 2001 defeating North Shore in the final. The club then won three premierships in a row from 2005 to 2007 defeating Newtown-Chilwell, St. Josephs and Bell Park respectively. The club won its fifth premiership in 2009 defeating St. Joseph's in the Grand Final played at Skilled Stadium. Further premierships were won in 2010, 2012, 2013. In 2008 South Barwon won under 18 premierships in both the GFL under 18's competition and the GFL under 18 B's competition and in 2009 won the premiership in the under 18 B's competition. In 2011 they won the inaugural Best of the Best pre-season tournament, defeating the Maribyrnong Park Football Club from the Essendon District Football League in the final.

== Premierships ==
- Geelong Football Netball League (8):
  - 2001, 2005, 2006, 2007, 2009, 2010, 2012, 2013

=== Notable players ===
- Tom Stewart - Geelong
- Scott Thompson - North Melbourne
- Mark Blake - Geelong
- Andrew Wills - Geelong, Fremantle, Western Bulldogs
- Craig Biddiscombe - Geelong, Richmond
- Paul Corrigan - Geelong

=== Notable netballer’s ===
- Kelsey Browne- Melbourne Vixens, SC Lightning, Collingwood, West Coast Fever
- Madison Browne- Melbourne Kestrels, Melbourne Vixens, West Coast Fever, Collingwood

== Bibliography ==
- Cat Country: History of Football In The Geelong Region by John Stoward – ISBN 978-0-9577515-8-3
