= Norm Glenister =

Australian rules footballer, born 1915

Personal information
- Full name: Norman Leslie Glenister
- Born: 23 August 1915; Geelong, Victoria
- Died: 17 November 1963 (aged 48)
- Original team: Geelong West (GDFL)
- Height: 180 cm (5 ft 11 in)
- Weight: 78 kg (172 lb)

Playing career^{1}
Years	Club	Games (Goals)
1934–40, 1945–46	Geelong	124 (262)
- ^{1} Playing statistics correct to the end of 1946.

Norman Leslie Glenister (23 August 1915 – 17 November 1963) was an Australian rules footballer who played with Geelong in the VFL during the 1930s and 1940s.

Whether playing as a half forward flanker, centreman or rover, Glenister was a consistent goalkicker for Geelong and bar his debut year when he played just two games never failed to kick 20 goals in a season. He missed Geelong's 1937 premiership due to injury and topped their goalkicking in 1939 with 36 goals. His best season tally however was 50 goals which he kicked in 1938. A Victorian interstate representative, he kicked five goals in a game against South Australia in 1939.

Glenister also played for Victorian Football Association club Coburg, crossing without a clearance in 1941 during the throw-pass era, before returning to Geelong in 1945 after his suspension for crossing without a clearance had ended.

Glenister's brother Harold briefly played alongside him in the same Geelong team.
