= Wally Glenister =

Australian rules footballer

Personal information
- Full name: Walter Leonard Glenister
- Born: 30 May 1918; Korumburra, Victoria
- Died: 12 May 1972 (aged 53); Braybrook, Victoria
- Original team: Yarraville Sugarworks
- Height: 180 cm (5 ft 11 in)
- Weight: 76 kg (168 lb)

Playing career^{1}
Years	Club	Games (Goals)
1937–38	Footscray	8 (6)
- ^{1} Playing statistics correct to the end of 1938.

Walter Leonard Glenister (30 May 1918 – 12 May 1972) was an Australian rules footballer who played with Footscray in the Victorian Football League (VFL).
