= Graeme McCartney =

Australian rules footballer

Personal information
- Full name: Albert Graeme McCartney
- Born: 8 May 1933; Nyah, Victoria
- Died: 17 July 2000 (aged 67)
- Original team: Hopetoun
- Height: 173 cm (5 ft 8 in)
- Weight: 70 kg (154 lb)

Playing career^{1}
Years	Club	Games (Goals)
1957	Richmond	1 (0)
1958	Moorabbin (VFA)	1 (0)
- ^{1} Playing statistics correct to the end of 1957.

Albert Graeme McCartney (8 May 1933 – 17 July 2000) was an Australian rules footballer who played with Richmond in the Victorian Football League (VFL).
