= David Harris (Australian footballer) =

Australian rules footballer

Personal information
- Full name: David George Harris
- Born: 12 July 1946 (age 80)
- Original team: St Peters / Geelong West
- Height: 178 cm (5 ft 10 in)
- Weight: 77 kg (170 lb)
- Position: Centreman

Playing career^{1}
Years	Club	Games (Goals)
1969–1972	Geelong	44 (20)

Coaching career^{3}
Years	Club	Games (W–L–D)
1975–1976	Hobart	38 (19–19–0)
1983–1986	Geelong West	77 (47–30–0)
- ^{1} Playing statistics correct to the end of 1972.^{3} Coaching statistics correct as of 1986.

David George Harris (born 12 July 1946) is a former Australian rules footballer who played with Geelong in the Victorian Football League (VFL).

== Playing career ==
Harris, originally from St Peters, spent his early career with Geelong West in the Victorian Football Association (VFA). A centreman, Harris was "best on ground" in Geelong West's 1968 premiership team and polled the third most votes in the Field Trophy (Second Division).

He was recruited to Geelong in 1969 and after debuting in round nine remained in the side for the remainder of the season, including the club's semi final loss to Richmond.

In 1970 he appeared in the opening four rounds of the season, then broke his collarbone and didn't play seniors again that year.

He had an injury free 1971 season and played in all 22 rounds, amassing 369 disposals.

During the 1972 season, Harris returned to Geelong West, where he finished the year playing in another premiership team. He was appointed captain in 1974 and had a good enough year to win the best and fairest, finish equal sixth in the J. J. Liston Trophy count and earn selection in the "VFA Team of the Year".

== Coaching years ==
His senior coaching career began in 1975 when he was appointed captain-coach of Hobart. He coached Hobart for two seasons.

Harris coached the Geelong reserves to three successive premierships, in 1980, 1981 and 1982.

From 1983 to 1986, Harris was coach of Geelong West and led the club to the finals in 1983 and 1984.
