= Mick Glenister =

Australian rules footballer, born 1917

Personal information
- Full name: Harold Alfred Glenister
- Born: 21 November 1917; Geelong, Victoria
- Died: 6 August 2010 (aged 92); Wangaratta, Victoria
- Original team: Geelong West
- Height: 180 cm (5 ft 11 in)
- Weight: 74 kg (163 lb)

Playing career^{1}
Years	Club	Games (Goals)
1939–41	Geelong	39 (9)
- ^{1} Playing statistics correct to the end of 1941.

Harold Alfred "Mick" Glenister (21 November 1917 – 6 August 2010) was an Australian rules footballer who played with Geelong in the Victorian Football League (VFL).
