= Ricky Browne =

Australian rules footballer

Personal information
- Full name: Richard Browne
- Born: 26 August 1950 (age 76)
- Original team: Geelong West
- Height: 183 cm (6 ft 0 in)
- Weight: 84 kg (185 lb)

Playing career^{1}
Years	Club	Games (Goals)
1974–1975	Geelong	25 (14)
- ^{1} Playing statistics correct to the end of 1975.

Richard "Ricky" Browne (born 26 August 1950) is a former Australian rules footballer who played with Geelong in the Victorian Football League (VFL).

== Career ==
Browne was an accomplished player for Geelong West in the Victorian Football Association (VFA) before being recruited to the VFL. A centreman in Geelong West's 1972 premiership team, Browne also won his second successive club best and fairest that year. He was one vote off winning the J. J. Liston Trophy in 1973, which went to Ray Shaw from Preston.

Both Ricky and younger brother Mark Browne debuted for Geelong in the opening round of the 1974 VFL season, against Footscray at Western Oval. He put together 18 league games that season and made a further seven appearances the following year. In 1976 was cleared to East Fremantle, which helped Geelong secure Brian Peake, although Peake wouldn't move to Geelong until 1981 and Browne never played league football for East Fremantle.

He was non playing coach of Geelong West in the 1981 VFA season.
