= Leopold Football Netball Club =

Leopold

Names
- Full name: Leopold Football Netball Club
- Nickname(s): Lions

Club details
- Founded: 1955; 70 years ago
- Colours
- Premierships: (5): 1979, 1990, 2016, 2023, 2024
- Ground(s): Leopold Memorial Park

Uniforms
Home

Other information
- Official website: leopoldlions.com.au

The Leopold Football Netball Club, nicknamed the Lions, is an Australian rules football and netball club based in Leopold, Victoria. The club teams currently compete in the regional Geelong Football Netball League. They play their home games at Leopold Memorial Park.

== History ==
Originally a team from Leopold played in local competitions from 1897 to 1922, until it was disbanded in 1923.

In 1955 they reformed and entered into the Geelong & District Football League, Jarman Cup division. In 1963 they lost the Grand Final, both Grand Finalists were promoted to the Woolworths Cup. In 1964 they made the Woolworth Cup Grand Final but lost by a point.

In 1965 the transferred into the Polwarth Football League. While in this league moves were made for a Bellarine Peninsula based football competition. In 1971 they were one of the founding clubs of the Bellarine Football League. Finally in 1992 Leopold was admitted into the Geelong Football League, where has remained up to present days.

== VFL/AFL players ==
- David Loats – Hawthorn
- Ben Graham – Geelong
- Tony Brown – St Kilda
- Tim Boyle – Hawthorn
- Clint Bartram – Melbourne
- Mario Bortolotto – Geelong, Carlton
- Luke Dahlhaus – Western Bulldogs
- Tom Ruggles - Geelong
- Jed Bews - Geelong

Craig Dowsett. - Geelong

== Bibliography ==
- Cat Country – History of Football in the Geelong Region, John Stoward, ISBN 978-0-9577515-8-3
