= Graham Robbins =

Australian rules footballer

Personal information
- Full name: Graham Martin Robbins
- Born: 6 May 1949 (age 77)
- Original team: Catani
- Height: 180 cm (5 ft 11 in)
- Weight: 76 kg (168 lb)

Playing career^{1}
Years	Club	Games (Goals)
1969–1971	Richmond	13 (9)
- ^{1} Playing statistics correct to the end of 1971.

Graham Martin Robbins (born 6 May 1949) is a former Australian rules footballer who played with Richmond in the Victorian Football League (VFL).

Robbins, who came from Catani, played at Richmond for three seasons, including their premiership year in 1969. A rover, Robbins only made three appearances that season, from rounds 12 to 14, but played nine senior games in 1970.

He joined Victorian Football Association (VFA) club Oakleigh early in the 1971 season, after making one further appearance for Richmond. A member of Oakleigh's 1972 VFA premiership winning team, Robbins later played in South Australia, with the South Adelaide Football Club. He topped South Adelaide's goal-kicking in 1975 and was club captain in 1977.

In the early 1980s, Robbins coached in the Latrobe Valley Football League. He steered Sale to a grand final in 1981, which they lost to Bairnsdale, then in 1983 and 1984 was playing coach of Maffra. His second stint coaching Maffra, from 2009 to 2011, brought two premierships (2009 & 2010).

His son, Ben Robbins, played 92 AFL games, for the Brisbane Bears, Brisbane Lions and Kangaroos.
