= St Albans Football Club (GFL) =

St Albans

Names
- Full name: St Albans Football Netball Club
- Nickname: Supersaints

Club details
- Founded: 1880; 146 years ago
- Colours: Black and White
- Competition: Geelong Football Netball League
- President: Craig Osborne, Virginia Wilson
- Coach: Alex Tortora
- Captain: Jacob Russell
- Premierships: (8): 1904, 1954, 1964, 1968, 1971, 1972, 1987, 1988
- Ground: St Albans Reserve

Uniforms
Home

St Albans Football Netball Club, nicknamed the Supersaints, is an Australian rules football and netball club based at St Albans Reserve, East Geelong, Victoria. The club teams currently compete in the Geelong Football League (GFL), the premier league in Geelong.

== History ==
The club was formed in 1880, making it one of the oldest in the Geelong area. They defeated Drysdale to win a premiership in 1904.

After the World War II the club spent many years in the Woolworths Cup competition of the Geelong & District Football League. Promoted to Division one from 1973 they then joined the Geelong Football League when that league was founded in 1979 and won back to back flags in 1987 and 1988.

== Premierships ==
- Geelong Football League (2):
  - 1987, 1988
- Geelong & District Football League (6):
  - 1949, 1954, 1964, 1968, 1971, 1972

== Senior Ladder Positions Since 2009 ==
Ladder positions since 2009:

- 2009- 11th
- 2010- 9th
- 2011- 12th
- 2012- 11th
- 2013- 8th
- 2014- 9th
- 2015- 7th
- 2016- 9th
- 2017- 11th
- 2018- 11th

== Bibliography ==
- Cat Country: History of Football In The Geelong Region by John Stoward – ISBN 978-0-9577515-8-3
