= North Shore Football Club (GFL) =

North Shore

Names
- Full name: North Shore Football Netball Club
- Nickname: Seagulls

Club details
- Founded: 1927; 99 years ago
- Colours: Blue Gold
- Premierships: (17): 1938, 1939, 1948, 1974, 1976, 1977, 1980, 1981, 1983, 1990, 1993, 1995, 1996, 1997, 1998, 1999, 2000
- Ground: Windsor Park

Uniforms
Home

Other information
- Official website: northshoreseagulls.com.au

North Shore Football Club Inc, nicknamed the Seagulls, is an Australian rules football and netball club based in the suburb town of North Shore, Victoria.

The club teams currently compete in the Geelong Football Netball League, the premier league in Geelong.

== History ==
The club was formed in 1927 and first tasted success with back to back flags in 1938 and 1939. After the Second World War the club spent many years in the Woolworths Cup competition of the Geelong & District Football League. Promoted to Division one from 1965 they then joined the Geelong Football League when that league was founded in 1979 and won six premierships in a row from 1995 to 2000.

Some of the more influential names to play for the club through this golden era include Ron Watt, Glenn Keast, Tom Hall, Danny Warren, Simon Riddoch, David Milsome, Wade Chapman, Bill Nicholls, Travis Robertson, Chris Huxtable, Brad "Don't Bowl Here" McDougall and the mercurial Robert Alslop.

Since the beginning of the Geelong Football League in 1979, North Shore have played in 15 Senior Grand Finals, winning 11 and losing 4 at 73.33% win percentage. The reserves have competed in 22 Grand Finals, winning 9 and losing 12 (42.86%).

== Premierships ==
- Geelong Football League
  - 1980, 1981, 1983, 1990, 1993, 1995, 1996, 1997, 1998, 1999, 2000
- Geelong & District Football League
  - 1938, 1939, 1948, 1974, 1976, 1977.

== Bibliography ==
- Cat Country: History of Football In The Geelong Region by John Stoward - ISBN 978-0-9577515-8-3
