= Geelong Football Netball League =

Australian rules football and netball league in Victoria

- Formerly: Geelong Football League (1979–2012)
- Sport: Australian rules football; Netball
- Founded: 1979; 47 years ago
- No. of teams: 12
- Country: Australia
- Headquarters: Highton, Victoria, Australia
- Confederation: AFL Barwon
- Sponsor: Blood Toyota
- Related competitions: Geelong & District FNL; Bellarine FNL
- Website: www.aflbarwon.com.au/gfnl

The Geelong Football Netball League is an Australian rules football and netball league in Victoria, Australia. It is widely regarded as the highest-standard Australian rules football league in regional Victoria, with several former AFL players now playing for a variety of clubs.

== History ==
The league was formed in 1979 when twelve clubs broke away from the Geelong & District Football League. The city and country clubs of the old GDFL were divided into the major league competition of the GFL and the minor league of the GDFL. Many of the teams in the lower league wanted a system of promotion and relegation, which was fought by the GFL until the early 1980s when the Victorian Country Football League held a hearing in Melbourne. As a result, a trial promotion–relegation system was put into place on a voluntary basis. Today, the GDFL is opposed to the promotion–relegation system, with a three-division, three-league competition of the Geelong FL, Bellarine FL and Geelong & District FL in place in the Geelong region.

In March 2024, following extensive consultation, AFL Barwon detailed a plan that would expand the second-tier Bellarine Football Netball League to 12 teams from 2025 with a path for a team to accept an invitation for promotion to the GFNL, replacing a club that would then be relegated from the GFNL.

== Clubs ==
=== Locations ===
Locations of the 2025 GFNL clubs. Colac play 70 km west of Geelong.

=== Current clubs ===
Club	Colours	Moniker	Home venue	Est.	Former league	GFNL Seasons	GFNL premierships			
Club	Colours	Moniker	Home venue	Est.	Former league	GFNL Seasons	Football		Netball	
Club	Colours	Moniker	Home venue	Est.	Former league	GFNL Seasons	Total	Most recent	Total	Most recent
Bell Park		Dragons	Hamlyn Park, Bell Park	1958	GDFL	1979–present	4	2011	0	—
Colac		Tigers	Central Reserve, Colac	1948	HFL	2001–present	1	2014	0	—
Grovedale		Tigers	Burdoo Reserve, Grovedale	1947	GDFL	1979–present	0	—	0	—
Geelong West		Giants	West Oval, Geelong West	2017	—	2017–present	0	—	0	—
Leopold		Lions	Leopold Memorial Park, Leopold	1955	BFL	1992–present	3	2024	0	—
Newtown & Chilwell		Eagles	Elderslie Reserve, Newtown	1933	GDFL	1979–present	3	1986	10	2026
North Shore		Seagulls	Windsor Park, North Shore	1927	GDFL	1979–present	11	2000	2	2001
South Barwon		Swans	McDonald Reserve, Belmont	1990	—	1990–present	8	2013	8	2012
St Albans		Supersaints	St Albans Reserve, Thomson	1880	GDFL	1979–present	2	1988	0	—
St Joseph's		Joeys	Herne Hill Reserve, Herne Hill	1973	GDFL	1985–present	4	2018	1	2008
St Mary's		Saints	Anthony Costa Oval, South Geelong	1953	GDFL	1979–present	8	2026	0	—

=== In recess for 2026 ===
Club	Colours	Moniker	Home venue	Est.	Former league	GFNL Seasons	GFNL premierships			
Club	Colours	Moniker	Home venue	Est.	Former league	GFNL Seasons	Football		Netball	
Club	Colours	Moniker	Home venue	Est.	Former league	GFNL Seasons	Total	Most recent	Total	Most recent
Lara		Cats	Lara Recreation Reserve, Lara	1880	GDFL	1989–present	2	2002	2	2003

=== Former clubs ===
Club	Colours	Moniker	Home venue	Former league	Est.	GFNL Seasons	GFNL premierships		Fate
Club	Colours	Moniker	Home venue	Former league	Est.	GFNL Seasons	Total	Most recent	Fate
Barwon		Bulldogs	Highton Recreation Reserve, Highton	GDFL	1856	1979–1989	0	—	Merged with Belmont to form South Barwon in 1990
East Geelong		Eagles	Richmond Oval, East Geelong	GDFL	1879	1979	0	—	Returned to Geelong & District FNL in 1980
Geelong Amateur		Ammos	Queens Park, Highton	GDFL	1926	1986–1988	0	—	Moved to Bellarine FNL in 1989
Geelong West SC		Cheetahs	Bakers Oval, Geelong West	GDFL	1926	1979–1985	0	—	Returned to Geelong & District FNL in 1986
Geelong West St Peters (West Saints 1992-96)		Roosters	West Oval, Geelong West	—	1989	1989–2016	0	—	Merged with Geelong West SC to form Geelong West Giants in 2017
North Geelong		Magpies	Osborne Park, North Geelong	GDFL	1876	1979–1982	0	—	Returned to Geelong & District FNL in 1984
St Peters		Saints	Walker Oval, Herne Hill	GDFL	c. 1950	1979, 1982–1988	0	—	Played in Geelong & District FNL in 1980-81. Merged with Geelong West to form Geelong West St Peters in 1989
Thomson		Tigers	Thomson Recreation Reserve, Thomson	GDFL	1953	1979–1981, 1984	0	—	Returned to Geelong & District FNL in 1982 and 1985

== Premiers ==
=== Senior football ===
The winner of the best on ground award is presented with the Frank Fopiani Medal, named in honour of the late midfielder who won eight GFNL premierships and three best-afield medals during his time with North Shore and St Mary's. In 2015, Fopiani was named by the Geelong Advertiser as the greatest GFNL player of all time. The renaming of the award was announced in September 2024, a month after Fopiani's passing.

^{+}	Team also won the minor premiership for finishing on top of the ladder
^{^}	Player also won the Mathieson Medal as the best and fairest in the league

Season	Premiers	Runners-up	Score	Venue	Best on ground	Ref.
1979	St Mary's	North Shore	15.13 (103) d. 12.10 (82)	West Oval	Trevor McLean (St Mary's)	
1980	North Shore^{+}	St Mary's	14.11 (95) d. 13.7 (85)	West Oval	Steve Mathieson (North Shore)	
1981	North Shore^{+} (2)	Newtown & Chilwell	14.12 (96) d. 12.8 (80)	West Oval	John Albon (North Shore)	
1982	Newtown & Chilwell	St Peters	19.21 (135) d. 12.9 (81)	West Oval	Gary Kelly (Newtown & Chilwell)	
1983	North Shore^{+} (3)	Bell Park	18.14 (122) d. 17.14 (116)	West Oval	Darren Purcell (North Shore)	
1984	Bell Park	St Albans	12.9 (81) d. 10.6 (66)	West Oval	Grant Sutherland (Bell Park)	
1985	Newtown & Chilwell^{+} (2)	St Albans	21.11 (137) d. 13.18 (96)	West Oval	Basil Flynn^{^} (Newtown & Chilwell)	
1986	Newtown & Chilwell (3)	St Albans	21.8 (144) d. 15.8 (98)	West Oval	Basil Flynn (2) (Newtown & Chilwell)	
1987	St Albans^{+}	Newtown & Chilwell	14.12 (110) d. 12.16 (88)	West Oval	Mark Dahlhaus^{^} (St Albans)	
1988	St Albans^{+} (2)	St Joseph's	12.14 (86) d. 11.12 (78)	West Oval	Wayne Tyquin (St Albans)	
1989	St Joseph's^{+}	St Mary's	18.14 (122) d. 10.5 (65)	West Oval	John Fitzgerald (St Joseph's)	
1990	North Shore (4)	St Mary's	14.17 (101) d. 13.9 (87)	West Oval	Russell Campbell (North Shore)	
1991	Bell Park^{+} (2)	North Shore	10.9 (69) d. 4.8 (32)	West Oval	Brad Nicholls (Bell Park)	
1992	St Mary's^{+} (2)	Lara	20.6 (126) d. 12.19 (91)	West Oval	Michael Hosking (St Mary's)	
1993	North Shore^{+} (5)	Lara	25.10 (160) d. 12.12 (64)	West Oval	Frank Fopiani (North Shore)	
1994	Lara^{+}	St Mary's	13.12 (90) d. 12.10 (82)	West Oval	Jason Hassett (Lara)	
1995	North Shore^{+} (6)	Lara	15.22 (112) d. 10.9 (69)	West Oval	Frank Fopiani (2) (North Shore)	
1996	North Shore (7)	West Saints	9.15 (69) d. 8.12 (60)	West Oval	Damien Clark (North Shore)	
1997	North Shore^{+} (8)	St Joseph's	22.14 (146) d. 18.7 (115)	West Oval	Glenn Keast (North Shore)	
1998	North Shore^{+} (9)	South Barwon	25.15 (165) d. 11.11 (77)	West Oval	Danny Warren (North Shore)	
1999	North Shore^{+} (10)	St Joseph's	24.12 (156) d. 12.7 (79)	Kardinia Park	Nathan Lewis (North Shore)	
2000	North Shore (11)	Lara	9.12 (66) d. 3.9 (27)	Kardinia Park	Mick Atkins (North Shore)	
2001	South Barwon	North Shore	16.15 (11) d. 9.4 (58)	Kardinia Park	Glen Wallace (South Barwon)	
2002	Lara^{+} (2)	St Joseph's	17.14 (116) d. 13.14 (92)	Kardinia Park	Paul Lynch (Lara)	
2003	Bell Park (3)	St Mary's	8.11 (59) drew 8.11 (59)	Kardinia Park	Andrew Merriman (St Mary's)	
2003	Bell Park (3)	St Mary's	R: 14.6 (90) d. 10.11 (71)	Kardinia Park	Bruce Cohen (Bell Park)	
2004	St Mary's (3)	North Shore	19.8 (122) d. 14.11 (95)	Kardinia Park	Frank Fopiani (3) (St Mary's)	
2005	South Barwon (2)	Newtown & Chilwell	17.13 (125) d. 14.10 (94)	Kardinia Park	Leighton Richards (South Barwon)	
2006	South Barwon (3)	St Joseph's	14.12 (96) d. 12.8 (80)	Kardinia Park	Warwick Knuckey (South Barwon)	
2007	South Barwon^{+} (4)	Bell Park	11.13 (79) d. 6.6 (42)	Kardinia Park	Jason Armistead (South Barwon)	
2008	St Mary's^{+} (4)	Colac	21.15 (141) d. 5.12 (42)	Kardinia Park	Ben Lavars (St Mary's)	
2009	South Barwon^{+} (5)	St Joseph's	15.12 (102) d. 6.9 (45)	Kardinia Park	Paul Sullivan (South Barwon)	
2010	South Barwon (6)	Bell Park	11.14 (80) d. 7.13 (55)	Kardinia Park	Luke Buckland (South Barwon)	
2011	Bell Park^{+} (4)	South Barwon	11.12 (78) d. 11.6 (72)	Kardinia Park	Charlie Hallam (Bell Park)	
2012	South Barwon^{+} (7)	Bell Park	17.9 (111) d. 8.12 (60)	Kardinia Park	Clinton Wells (South Barwon)	
2013	South Barwon^{+} (8)	Grovedale	13.16 (94) d. 12.2 (74)	Kardinia Park	Anthony Biemans (South Barwon)	
2014	Colac	Leopold	19.14 (128) d. 11.13 (79)	Kardinia Park	Marcus Crook (Colac)	
2015	St Joseph's^{+} (2)	Newtown & Chilwell	13.15 (93) d. 11.9 (75)	Kardinia Park	Daniel Lovick (St Joseph's)	
2016	Leopold^{+}	St Mary's	14.9 (93) d. 8.9 (57)	Kardinia Park	Jai Thompson (Leopold)	
2017	St Joseph's^{+} (3)	St Mary's	18.16 (124) d. 9.7 (61)	Kardinia Park	Daniel Lovick (2) (St Joseph's)	
2018	St Joseph's (4)	St Mary's	13.8 (86) d. 11.11 (77)	Kardinia Park	Joe Macula (St Joseph's)	
2019	St Mary's (5)	Colac	10.14 (74) d. 10.12 (72)	Kardinia Park	Ben Moloney (St Mary's)	
2020	Season cancelled due to ongoing COVID-19 pandemic					
2021	Season curtailed due to ongoing COVID-19 pandemic in Victoria					
2022	St Mary's^{+} (6)	Leopold	13.13 (91) d. 6.10 (46)	St Albans Reserve	Damian McMahon (St Mary's)	
2023	Leopold (2)	South Barwon	13.16 (94) d. 6.8 (44)	Leopold Memorial Park	Logan Wagener (Leopold)	
2024	Leopold (3)	South Barwon	12.11 (83) d. 9.8 (62)	Kardinia Park	Brock Williamson (Leopold)	
2025	St Mary's (7)	St Joseph's	10.8 (68) d. 7.13 (55)	Kardinia Park	Keidan Rayner (St Mary's)	
2026	St Mary's^{+} (8)	South Barwon	15.11 (101) d. 12.9 (81)	Kardinia Park	Fletcher Hughes (St Mary's)	

=== A Grade netball ===
The winner of the best on court award is presented with the Olivia Cameron Medal, named in honour of the six-time GFNL premiership player who took the court for more than 350 A Grade games at South Barwon.

Season	Premiers	Runners-up	Score	Venue	Best on court	Ref.
2000	North Shore	St Joseph's	32 – 17	[?]	[?]	
2001	North Shore (2)	Colac	32 – 31	[?]	[?]	
2002	Lara	North Shore	54 – 44	[?]	[?]	
2003	Lara (2)	South Barwon	51 – 49	[?]	[?]	
2004	South Barwon	Grovedale	53 – 46	[?]	[?]	
2005	South Barwon (2)	Grovedale	61 – 44	[?]	[?]	
2006	South Barwon (3)	St Joseph's	64 – 36	[?]	[?]	
2007	South Barwon (4)	St Joseph's	54 – 38	[?]	[?]	
2008	St Joseph's	South Barwon	49 – 38	[?]	[?]	
2009	South Barwon (5)	Colac	59 – 35	[?]	[?]	
2010	South Barwon (6)	St Mary's	49 – 47	Geelong Arena	Kelsey Browne (South Barwon)	
2011	South Barwon (7)	St Mary's	55 – 41	Geelong Arena	[?]	
2012	South Barwon (8)	Leopold	59 – 43	Geelong Arena	[?]	
2013	Newtown & Chilwell	South Barwon	54 – 31	Geelong Arena	Casey Price (Newtown & Chilwell)	
2014	Newtown & Chilwell (2)	Leopold	49 – 28	Kardinia Park	Danielle Stewart (Newtown & Chilwell)	
2015	Newtown & Chilwell (3)	South Barwon	44 – 43	Kardinia Park	Danielle Stewart (2) (Newtown & Chilwell)	
2016	Newtown & Chilwell (4)	South Barwon	51 – 42	Kardinia Park	Kathleen Knott (Newtown & Chilwell)	
2017	Newtown & Chilwell (5)	St Albans	58 – 46	Kardinia Park	Julia Woolley (Newtown & Chilwell)	
2018	Newtown & Chilwell (6)	St Albans	60 – 45	Kardinia Park	Kathleen Knott (2) (Newtown & Chilwell)	
2019	Newtown & Chilwell (7)	St Albans	57 – 30	Kardinia Park	Danielle Stewart (3) (Newtown & Chilwell)	
2020	Season cancelled due to ongoing COVID-19 pandemic					
2021	Season curtailed due to ongoing COVID-19 pandemic in Victoria					
2022	Colac	Newtown & Chilwell	41 – 33	St Albans Reserve	Brooke Allan (Colac)	
2023	Colac (2)	Newtown & Chilwell	38 – 37	Leopold Memorial Park	Indya Forde (Colac)	
2024	Newtown & Chilwell (8)	St Joseph's	38 – 34	Kardinia Park	Julia Woolley (2) (Newtown & Chilwell)	
2025	Newtown & Chilwell (9)	St Joseph's	37 – 25	Kardinia Park	Charity Nasalio (Newtown & Chilwell)	
2026	Newtown & Chilwell (10)	St Joseph's	57 – 47	Kardinia Park	Holly Adams-Alcock (Newtown & Chilwell)	

== Individual awards ==
=== Senior football ===
==== Mathieson Medal ====
The Don Mathieson Medal is presented to the league's best and fairest player at the conclusion of the home-and-away season. It is named after Don Mathieson OAM, who founded the league in 1979. Two players have won the award on three occasions: John Williams for Barwon and St Mary's across four seasons in the late 1980s, and Newtown & Chilwell's Matt McMahon in consecutive seasons in the late 2010s. The award has been shared on 10 occasions, most notably during a four-way tie in 1995.

^{^}	Player also won the Leading Goalkicker Award

Table of recipients
Season	Player	Club	Votes	Ref.
1979	Ray Pawley	Bell Park	[?]	
1980	Alex Rizun	Bell Park	[?]	
1981	Alan Woodman	St Albans	[?]	
1982	Brent Dew	St Albans	[?]	
1983	John Pickering	St Peters	[?]	
1984	Rod Barrett	St Mary's	[?]	
1984	Vin Todd	North Shore	[?]	
1985	Basil Flynn	Newtown & Chilwell	[?]	
1986	John Williams	Barwon	[?]	
1987	Mark Dahlhaus	St Albans	[?]	
1987	Paul Keating	North Shore	[?]	
1988	John Williams (2)	St Mary's	[?]	
1989	John Williams (3)	St Mary's	[?]	
1990	Paul Keating (2)	North Shore	[?]	
1991	Glenn Keast	St Albans	[?]	
1992	Dennis Pacor	South Barwon	[?]	
1992	Rene Peters	Lara	[?]	
1993	Brian Hinkley	Bell Park	[?]	
1994	Mark Dahlhaus (2)	Leopold	[?]	
1995	Alister Ford	St Albans	[?]	
1995	Glenn Keast (2)	North Shore	[?]	
1995	Shane Korth	South Barwon	[?]	
1995	Jason McGowan	North Shore	[?]	
1996	Matt Bruhn	Grovedale	[?]	
1997	Ricky O'Toole	St Joseph's	[?]	
1998	Mark Stewart	St Albans	[?]	
1999	Tom Hall	North Shore	[?]	
2000	Glen Wallace	South Barwon	[?]	
2001	Chris Huxtable	North Shore	[?]	
2002	Rick Wilde	Leopold	[?]	
2003	Rick Wilde (2)	Leopold	[?]	
2004	Danny O'Brien	North Shore	30	
2005	Christian Shaw	North Shore	20	
2006	Tony Brown	Leopold	19	
2007	Mark Corrigan	South Barwon	18	
2007	David Mensch	Grovedale	18	
2008	Torin Baker	St Joseph's	21	
2008	Paul Carson	Geelong West St Peters	21	
2009	Nick Batchelor	Bell Park	25	
2010	Ben Lavars	St Mary's	21	
2011	James Byrne	North Shore	19	
2011	Daniel Lovick	St Joseph's	19	
2012	Daniel Lovick (2)	St Joseph's	15 (Note: Colac's Andrew Kelly polled 21 votes to lead the count, but was ineligible due to suspension.)	
2012	Tim Sheringham	Bell Park	15	
2013	Stephen Paulke	Bell Park	18 (Note: Colac's Andrew Kelly polled 18 votes to jointly lead the count, but was ineligible due to suspension.)	
2014	Guy O'Keefe	Leopold	24	
2015	Stephen Paulke (2)	Bell Park	20	
2016	Nathan Deans	Grovedale	17	
2017	Matt McMahon	Newtown & Chilwell	21	
2018	Matt McMahon (2)	Newtown & Chilwell	32	
2019	Matt McMahon (3)	Newtown & Chilwell	33	
2020	Not awarded			
2021	Harry Benson	St Mary's	26 (Note: Only 12 games were played due to the ongoing COVID-19 pandemic.)	
2022	Harry Benson (2)	St Mary's	25 (Note: Colac's Darcy Lang polled 26 votes to lead the count, but was ineligible due to suspension.)	
2023	Matt Caldow	South Barwon	22	
2023	Fraser Fort	South Barwon	22	
2024	Doyle Madigan	South Barwon	19	
2025	Ned Harris	Newtown & Chilwell	23	
2025	Jett Bermingham	Bell Park	23	
2026	Mitch Burgess	Leopold	23	

==== Leading Goalkicker Award ====
The Leading Goalkicker Award is presented to the player who has kicked the most goals at the conclusion of the home-and-away season.

^{^}	Player also won the Mathieson Medal as the best and fairest in the league

Table of recipients
Season	Player	Club	Goals	Ref.
1979	Rod Aylmer	North Shore	71	
1980	Stephen Bentley	Grovedale	82	
1981	Ross Aylmer	North Shore	89	
1982	Kevin Higgins	Newtown & Chilwell	131	
1983	Bill Higgins	St Peters	103	
1984	Bill Higgins (2)	St Peters	102	
1985	John Scarlett	Newtown & Chilwell	104	
1986	Russell Webber	Newtown & Chilwell	95	
1987	Russell Webber (2)	Newtown & Chilwell	86	
1988	Wayne Tyquin	St Albans	114	
1989	Chris Doyle	St Joseph's	76	
1990	Dean Holroyd	Grovedale	74	
1991	Dean Holroyd (2)	Grovedale	52	
1992	Wayne Tyquin (2)	North Shore	117	
1993	Ray Sarcevic	Bell Park	107	
1994	Ian Tompkins	South Barwon	74	
1995	Matt Kershaw	Lara	78	
1996	Wayne Tyquin (3)	St Albans	103	
1997	Aaron Greaves	St Joseph's	86	
1998	Shane Lowther	Lara	73	
1999	Tom Hall	North Shore	88	
2000	Zvonimir Suto	Lara	100	
2001	Zvonimir Suto (2)	Lara	83	
2002	Zvonimir Suto (3)	Lara	59	
2003	Zvonimir Suto (4)	St Mary's	84	
2004	Jay Bett	Newtown & Chilwell	64	
2005	Aaron Greaves (2)	St Joseph's	84	
2006	Tim McLean	St Mary's	65	
2007	Dale Carson	Geelong West St Peters	56	
2008	Jarrod Garth	Bell Park	86	
2009	Tim McLean (2)	St Mary's	70	
2010	Dale Carson (2)	St Joseph's	56	
2011	Russell Robertson	St Joseph's	80	
2012	Russell Robertson (2)	St Joseph's	69	
2013	Shaydon Bloomfield	Lara	92	
2014	Jacob McGuane	Colac	78	
2015	Jase Perkins	St Albans	87	
2016	Jordan Erskine	Grovedale	78	
2017	Jarrod Garth (2)	Bell Park	90	
2018	Aiden Grace	St Mary's	59	
2019	Andrew Boseley	South Barwon	57	
2020	Not awarded			
2021	Tom Gillett	Grovedale	42	
2022	Mitch Patten	Leopold	55	
2023	Sam Dobson	St Mary's	60	
2024	Adam Garner	Colac	62	
2025	Connor Giddings	Leopold	68	
2026	Tom Higgins	St Albans	71	

=== A Grade netball ===
==== Julia Woolley Medal ====
The Julia Woolley Medal is presented to the league's best and fairest player at the conclusion of the home-and-away season. It was first named after goal attack Woolley in September 2025, after her having won seven GFNL premierships with Newtown & Chilwell, two league best-and-fairest awards, and two best-on-court medals. Woolley won an eighth premiership in 2026 and finished third in the voting of her now namesake award that season.

Table of recipients
Season	Player	Club	Votes	Ref.
2000	Sarah Birch	North Shore	[?]	
2001	Stacey Carson	Colac	[?]	
2002	Hope Carmody	Colac	[?]	
2003	Sascha Veldhuis	South Barwon	[?]	
2004	Jess Osment	Bell Park	29	
2005	Melanie Hyett	North Shore	25	
2006	Renee Smith	St Albans	26	
2007	Jess Gallagher	Leopold	23	
2007	Vikki Madden	St Joseph's	23	
2008	Renee Smith (2)	Grovedale	24	
2009	Casey Carroll	St Mary's	26	
2010	Renee Smith (3)	St Mary's	29	
2011	Shelley Scott	Colac	30	
2012	Kristy Davis	Lara	22	
2013	Julia Knott	Newtown & Chilwell	23	
2014	Molly Jovic	St Joseph's	27	
2015	Kaitlyn Amor	Leopold	29	
2016	Tori Honner	St Joseph's	25	
2016	Zanna Woods	Leopold	25	
2017	Zanna Woods (2)	Leopold	24	
2018	Zanna Woods (3)	Leopold	30	
2018	Julia Woolley (2)	Newtown & Chilwell	30	
2019	Hannah van Gemst	St Mary's	23	
2020	Not awarded			
2021	Tori Honner (2)	St Joseph's	11	
2021	Kaitlyn Sheringham	Bell Park	11	
2022	Ellen Doyle	South Barwon	22	
2023	Emma Buwalda	St Joseph's	34	
2024	Ellen Doyle (2)	South Barwon	20	
2024	Eliza Cahill	Colac	20	
2025	Ruby Pekin-Schlicht	Newtown & Chilwell	30	
2026	Kiahna Fallon	St Joseph's	21	

==== Hot Shot Award ====
Table of recipients
Season	Player	Club	Goals	Ref.
2000	[?]	[?]	[?]	
2001	[?]	[?]	[?]	
2002	[?]	[?]	[?]	
2003	[?]	[?]	[?]	
2004	[?]	[?]	[?]	
2005	Melanie Hyett	North Shore	581	
2006	Lara McLeod	St Joseph's	572	
2007	[?]	[?]	[?]	
2008	[?]	[?]	[?]	
2009	[?]	[?]	[?]	
2010	[?]	[?]	[?]	
2011	Erin Hoare	St Mary's	[?]	
2012	Courtney Cuolahan	Colac	526	
2013	Ruby Horton	South Barwon	[?]	
2014	Ruby Horton (2)	South Barwon	769	
2015	Ruby Horton (3)	South Barwon	729	
2016	Ruby Horton (4)	South Barwon	927	
2017	Tharjini Sivalingam	St Albans	701	
2018	Hannah van Gemst	St Mary's	[?]	
2019	Hannah van Gemst (2)	St Mary's	861	
2020	Not awarded			
2021	Jane Cook	St Albans	369	
2022	Ellen Doyle	South Barwon	892	
2023	Ellen Doyle (2)	South Barwon	701	
2024	Ellen Doyle (3)	South Barwon	727	
2025	Ellen Doyle (4)	South Barwon	808	
2026	Holly Adams-Alcock	Newtown & Chilwell	861	
