= List of Australian rules football clubs in Victoria =

This is a list of clubs that play Australian rules football in Victoria at the senior level.

== National Level ==
=== Australian Football League ===
Club	Colours	Nickname	Home Ground	Former league	Est.	VFL/AFL Seasons	VFL/AFL premierships	
Club	Colours	Nickname	Home Ground	Former league	Est.	VFL/AFL Seasons	Total	Most recent
Carlton		Blues	Marvel Stadium	VFA	1864	1897–	16	1995
Collingwood		Magpies	Melbourne Cricket Ground	VFA	1892	1897–	16	2023
Essendon		Bombers	Marvel Stadium	VFA	1872	1897–1915, 1918–	16	2000
Geelong		Cats	GMHBA Stadium	VFA	1859	1897–1915, 1917–	10	2022
Hawthorn		Hawks	Melbourne Cricket Ground	VFA	1902	1925–	13	2015
Melbourne		Demons	Melbourne Cricket Ground	VFA	1858	1897–1915, 1919–	13	2021
North Melbourne		Kangaroos	Marvel Stadium	VFA	1869	1925–	4	1999
Richmond		Tigers	Melbourne Cricket Ground	VFA	1885	1908–	13	2020
St Kilda		Saints	Marvel Stadium	VFA	1873	1897–1915, 1918–	1	1966
Western Bulldogs		Bulldogs	Marvel Stadium	VFA	1877	1925–	2	2016

== State Level ==
=== Victorian Football League ===
Club	Colours	Nickname	Home Ground	Former League	Est.	VFA/VFL Seasons	VFA/VFL Senior Premierships	
Club	Colours	Nickname	Home Ground	Former League	Est.	VFA/VFL Seasons	Total	Most recent
Box Hill (A)		Hawks	Box Hill City Oval, Box Hill	ESFL	1936	1951–	6	2026
Carlton (R)		Blues	Princes Park, Carlton North	AFL (R)	1919	2000–2002, 2021–	0	—
Casey (A)		Demons	Casey Fields, Cranbourne East	FFL	1903	1982–	7	2022
Coburg		Lions	Coburg City Oval, Coburg	VJFL	1891	1925–	8	1989
Collingwood (R)		Magpies	Olympic Park Oval, Melbourne	AFL (R)	1919	2000, 2008–	0	—
Essendon (R)		Bombers	Windy Hill, Essendon	AFL (R)	1919	2000–2002, 2013–	0	—
Footscray (R)		Bulldogs	Whitten Oval, Footscray	AFL (R)	1925	2014–	2	2016
Frankston		Dolphins	Frankston Park, Frankston	MPFL	1887	1966–2016, 2018–	1	1978
Geelong (R)		Cats	Kardinia Park, South Geelong	AFL (R)	1919	2000–	3	2012
North Melbourne (R)		Kangaroos	Arden Street Oval, North Melbourne	AFL (R)	1925	2018–	0	—
Port Melbourne		Borough	North Port Oval, Port Melbourne	—	1874	1886–	17	2017
Richmond (R)		Tigers	Punt Road Oval, East Melbourne	AFL (R)	1919	2000, 2014–	1	2019
Sandringham (A)		Zebras	Trevor Barker Beach Oval, Sandringham	—	1929	1929–	10	2006
St Kilda (R)		Saints	RSEA Park, Moorabbin	AFL (R)	1919	2000, 2026–	0	–
Werribee		Tigers	Chirnside Park, Werribee	—	1964	1965–	2	2024
Williamstown		Seagulls	Williamstown Cricket Ground, Williamstown	—	1864	1884–	16	2015

== Local Leagues – Melbourne ==
=== Eastern ===
Club	Colours	Nickname	Home Ground	Former League	Est.	EFNL Seasons	EFNL Senior Premierships	
Club	Colours	Nickname	Home Ground	Former League	Est.	EFNL Seasons	Total	Most recent
Balwyn		Tigers	Balwyn Park, Balwyn	SFL	1909	2007–	7	2025
Bayswater		Waters	Marie Wallace Bayswater Park, Bayswater	CFGFL	1895	1962–	7	2016
Beaconsfield		Eagles	Holm Park, Beaconsfield	OEFNL	1890	2022–	0	–
Berwick		Wickers	Edwin Flack Reserve, Berwick	OEFNL	1903	2021–	0	–
Blackburn		Panthers	Morton Park, Blackburn	CFGFL	1890	1962–	3	2002
Boronia		Hawks	Tormore Reserve, Boronia	CFGFL	1927	1962–	7	2024
Bulleen Templestowe		Bullants	Ted Ajani Reserve, Templestowe Lower	VAFA	1975	2025–	0	–
Chirnside Park		Panthers	Kimberley Reserve, Chirnside Park	VAFA	1978	2000–	1	2009
Coldstream		Cougars	Halley Supple Reserve, Coldstream	CFGFL	1890	1962–	3	2001
Croydon		Blues	Croydon Oval, Croydon	CFGFL	1906	1962–	2	1997
Croydon North MLOC		KangaRams	Hughes Park, Croydon North	–	2018	2019–	0	–
Doncaster		Sharks	Schramms Reserve, Doncaster	ESFL	1902	1962–2024, 2026–	7	2015
Doncaster East		Lions	Zerbes Reserve, Doncaster East	VAFA	1972	1982–	4	2019
Donvale		Magpies	Donvale Reserve, Donvale	ESCFA	1971	1992–2013, 2015–	7	2026
East Burwood		Rams	East Burwood Reserve, East Burwood	CFGFL	1910	1962–	12	2000
East Ringwood		Roos	East Ringwood Reserve, East Ringwood	CFGFL	1929	1962–	6	2026
Eastern Devils		Devils	Mulgrave Reserve, Wheelers Hill	SEWF	1999	2021–	2	2023
Fairpark		Lions	Fairpark Reserve, Ferntree Gully	YVMDFL	1972	1981–	2	2019
Ferntree Gully		Eagles	Wally Tew Reserve, Ferntree Gully	MDFA	1892	1965–	3	2016
Forest Hill		Zebras	Forest Hill Reserve, Forest Hill	–	1967	1970–	1	1984
Heathmont		Jets	HE Parker Reserve, Heathmont	CFGFL	1956	1962–	4	2011
Kilsyth		Cougars	Pinks Reserve, Kilsyth	CFGFL, VFA	1924	1962–1981, 1986–	3	1995
Knox		Falcons	Knox Gardens Reserve, Wantirna South	ESCFA	1980	1989–	4	2017
Lilydale		Falcons	Lilydale Recreation Reserve, Lilydale	YVFL	1872	1965–	6	2011
Mitcham		Tigers	Walker Park, Mitcham	CFGFL	1888	1962–	9	2024
Montrose		Demons	Montrose Recreation Reserve, Montrose	CMFL	1924	1964–	3	2013
Mooroolbark		Mustangs	Mooroolbark Heights Reserve, Mooroolbark	–	1966	1966–	2	2009
Mulgrave		Lions	Mulgrave Reserve, Wheelers Hill	CFGFL	1925	1962–	3	2010
Noble Park		Bulls	Pat Wright Senior Oval, Noble Park	SFL	1918	2000–	5	2022
North Ringwood		Saints	Quambee Reserve, Ringwood North	–	1962	1962–	6	2026
Norwood		Norsemen	Mullum Mullum Reserve, Ringwood	–	1960	1962–	5	2014
Nunawading		Lions	Koonung Reserve, Blackburn North	ESFL	1927	1962–	1	2002
Oakleigh District		Districts	Princes Highway Reserve, Oakleigh East	SFNL	1950	2022–	0	–
Park Orchards		Sharks	Domeney Reserve, Park Orchards	–	1969	2012–	1	2017
Ringwood		Redbacks	Jubilee Park, Ringwood	CFGFL	1899	1962–	3	2005
Rowville		Hawks	Seebeck Oval, Rowville	–	1964	1965–	6	2023
Scoresby		Magpies	Scoresby Recreation Reserve, Scoresby	CFGFL	1925	1962–	8	2025
Silvan		Cats	Silvan Recreation Ground, Silvan	YVMDFL	1921	1962–1965, 2011–	2	2022
South Belgrave		Saints	Belgrave South Recreation Reserve, Belgrave South	YVMDFL	1946	1969, 2008–	4	2025
South Croydon		Bulldogs	Cheong Park, South Croydon	–	1969	1969–	8	2017
Surrey Park		Panthers	Surrey Park Reserve, Box Hill	SFL	1994	2002–	3	2026
Templestowe		Dockers	Templestowe Reserve, Templestowe	DVFL	1892	1991–	2	2010
The Basin		Bears	Batterham Reserve, The Basin	CFGFL	1947	1962–	4	2012
Upper Ferntree Gully		Kings	Kings Park, Upper Ferntree Gully	MDFA	1948	1966–	5	2016
Vermont		Eagles	Vermont Recreation Reserve, Vermont	CFGFL	1919	1962–	21	2019
Wantirna South		Devils	Walker Reserve, Wantirna South	MDFA	1952	1965–	6	2025
Warrandyte		Bloods	Warrandyte Reserve, Warrandyte	CFGFL	1906	1962–	7	2026
Waverley Blues		Blues	Central Reserve, Glen Waverley	–	1998	1999–	4	2022
Whitehorse Pioneers		Pioneers	Springfield Park, Box Hill North	SFL	1954	1998–	3	2025

=== Essendon District ===
Club	Colours	Nickname	Home Ground	Former League(s)	Est.	EDFL Seasons	EDFL Senior Premierships	
Club	Colours	Nickname	Home Ground	Former League(s)	Est.	EDFL Seasons	Total	Most recent
Aberfeldie		Abers, Gorillas	Clifton Park, Aberfeldie	—	1948	1948–	8	2018
Airport West		Eagles	Hansen Reserve, Airport West	—	1961	1962–	7	2022
Avondale Heights		Heights	Canning Reserve, Avondale Heights	—	1965	1967–	5	2004
Burnside Heights		Bears	Burnside Heights Recreation Reserve, Burnside Heights	—	2012	2014–	0	—
Coburg Districts		Lions	Cole Reserve, Pascoe Vale	NMFL, WRFL	1951	1981–1987, 2013–	0	—
Craigieburn		Eagles	D.S. Aitken Reserve, Craigieburn	RDFNL	1970	2001–	3	2019
Deer Park		Lions	John McLeod Reserve, Deer Park	WRFL	1925	2023–	1	2023
East Keilor		Cougars	Overland Reserve, East Keilor	—	1967	1971–	7	2021
East Sunbury		Thunder	John McMahon Reserve, Sunbury	RDFNL	1999	2013–2021, 2023–	0	—
Essendon Doutta Stars		Stars	Nipper Jordan Oval, Essendon	VFL	1946	1946–	20	2015
Glenroy		Wallabies	Sewell Reserve, Glenroy	—	1946	1946–	14	2017
Greenvale		Jets	Greenvale Recreation Reserve, Greenvale	—	1990	1996–	5	2013
Hadfield		Hawks	Martin Reserve, Hadfield	—	1961	1971–	4	2015
Hillside		Sharks	Hillside Reserve, Hillside	—	1999	2005–	2	2025
Keilor		Blues	Keilor Recreation Reserve, Keilor	KBFL	1877	1932–	12	2024
Keilor Park		Devils	Keilor Park Recreational Reserve, Keilor Park	—	1974	1986–2017, 2019–	3	2022
Maribyrnong Park		Lions	Maribyrnong Park, Moonee Ponds	—	1980	1980–	5	2024
Moonee Valley		Valley	Ormond Park, Moonee Ponds	—	1933	1933–	7	2021
Northern Saints		Saints	Charles Mutton Reserve, Fawkner	—	2007	2008–	1	2013
Oak Park		Kangaroos	Oak Park Reserve, Oak Park	—	1957	1960–	5	2023
Pascoe Vale		Panthers	Raeburn Reserve, Pascoe Vale	VFL SD	1918	1952–	3	2011
Strathmore		Mores	Lebanon Reserve, Strathmore	—	1954	1957–	11	2026
Roxburgh Park		Magpies	Lakeside Resereve, Roxburgh Park	—	2002	2005–	1	2018
Rupertswood		Sharks	Salesian College, Sunbury	RDFNL	1984	2021–	1	2025
St Albans		Saints	Kings Park Reserve, Kings Park	WRFL	1947	2023–	0	__
Sunbury Kangaroos		Kangaroos	Eric Boardman Reserve, Sunbury	RDFNL	1987	2019–	1	2019
Taylors Lakes		Lions	Lionheart Reserve, Taylors Lakes	—	1989	1993–	2	2024
Tullamarine		Demons	Leo Dineen Reserve, Tullamarine	—	1974	1974–	8	2003
West Coburg		Burgers	Shore Reserve, Pascoe Vale South	VFA SD	1927	1954–	16	2026
Westmeadows		Tigers	Willowbrook Reserve, Westmeadows	—	1970	1977–	2	2026

=== Northern ===
Club	Colours	Nickname	Home Ground	Former League(s)	Est.	NFNL Seasons	NFNL Senior Premierships	
Club	Colours	Nickname	Home Ground	Former League(s)	Est.	NFNL Seasons	Total	Most recent
Banyule		Bears	R.J Brockwell Oval, Heidelberg	VAFA	1967	2015–	2	2022
Bundoora		Bulls	Yulong Reserve, Bundoora	PHFL	1974	1981–	6	2017
Darebin		Falcons	A.H. Capp Reserve, Preston	VWFL	1990	2017–	0	–
Diamond Creek		Demons	Coventry Oval, Diamond Creek	HDFL	1904	1922–1937, 1946–	8	2026
Diamond Creek Women's		Creekers	Plenty War Memorial Oval, Plenty	VWFL	2010	2017–	2	2025
Eltham		Panthers	Eltham Central Park, Eltham	VFLSD	1909	1922–1935, 1938–	13	2023
Epping		Blues, Pingers	Epping Recreation Reserve, Epping	BEFL	1904	1933–	9	2012
Fitzroy Stars		Stars	Sir Douglas Nicholls Oval, Thornbury	MNFL	1973	2008–	1	2025
Greensborough		Boro	War Memorial Park, Greensborough	HDFL	1893	1922–	18	2014
Heidelberg		Tigers	Warringal Park, Heidelberg	VFLSD	1876	1923–1925, 1928–1934, 1937–	25	2026
Heidelberg West		Hawks	Heidelberg Park, Heidelberg	VAFA	1936	1941–	1	1941
Hurstbridge		Bridges, Blues	Ben Frilay Memorial Oval, Hurstbridge	PHFL	1914	1923–1924, 1929, 1931, 1937–1938, 1988–	3	2016
Ivanhoe		Hoers	Ivanhoe Park, Ivanhoe	VAFA	1910	2024–	1	2026
Kilmore		Blues	JJ Clancy Reserve, Kilmore	RDFL	1887	2016–	0	–
Kinglake		Lakers	Kinglake Memorial Reserve, Kinglake	OEFNL	1925	1996–2000, 2002–2007, 2023–	0	–
Lalor		Bloods	Lalor Reserve, Lalor	PHFL	1955	1968–	8	2007
Laurimar		Power	Laurimar Reserve, Doreen	–	2017	2017–	1	2023
Lower Plenty		Bears	Montmorency Park, South Oval, Montmorency	SFL	1961	1995–	3	2018
Macleod		Kangaroos	De Winton Park, Rosanna	–	1946	1947–	3	2015
Mernda (Plenty Rovers 1932–64)		Demons	Waterview Recreation Reserve, Mernda	PHFL	1891	1937–1939, 1941, 1946, 1987–	2	2012
Montmorency		Magpies	Montmorency Park, North Oval, Montmorency	–	1924	1925–1930, 1936–1940, 1946–	4	1979
North Heidelberg		Bulldogs	Shelley Street Reserve. Heidelberg Heights	–	1958	1958–1972, 1974–	8	2017
Northcote Park		Cougars	Bill Lawry Oval, Northcote	PHFL	1952	1981–	8	2012
Old Eltham Collegians		Turtles	Eltham College Reserve, Research	VAFA	1986	2019–	0	–
Old Paradians		Raiders	Garvey Oval, Bundoora	VAFA	1929	2024–	2	2025
Panton Hill		Redbacks	Cracknell Reserve, Panton Hill	YVMDFL	1926	1929–1930, 1997–	2	2019
Reservoir		Mustangs	Crispe Park, Reservoir	PHFL	1923	1946–1948, 1981–2006, 2008–2015, 2017–	4	2015
South Morang		Lions	Mill Park Lakes Reserve, South Morang	–	1954	1955–	3	2024
St Mary's		Burra	Whatmough Park, Greensborough	–	2009	2010–	1	2018
Thomastown		Bears	Main Street Reserve, Thomastown	VAFA	1976	2001–	2	2014
Wallan (Women's team only)		Magpies	Greenhill Reserve, Wallan	–	1904	2019–	1	2023
Watsonia		Saints	A K Lines Reserve, Watsonia	PHFL	1967	1969–	2	2016
West Preston Lakeside		Roosters	J E Moore Park, Reservoir	–	1998	1998–	4	2019
Whittlesea		Eagles	Whittlesea Showgrounds, Whittlesea	RDFNL	1896	1934–1939, 1946, 1992–	4	2019

=== Southern ===
Club	Colours	Nickname	Home Ground	Former League(s)	Est.	SFNL Seasons	SFNL Senior Premierships	
Club	Colours	Nickname	Home Ground	Former League(s)	Est.	SFNL Seasons	Total	Most recent
Ashwood		Magpies	Essex Heights Reserve, Ashwood	–	1985	1985–	2	2001
Bentleigh		Demons	Bentleigh Reserve, Bentleigh	ESCFL, VAFA	1965	1993–1999, 2010–	1	2013
Berwick Springs		Titans	Mick Morland Reserve, Clyde North	OEFNL	2019	2025–	0	–
Black Rock		Jets	Donald MacDonald Reserve, Black Rock	ESCFA	1908	1986–1991, 1993–	4	2022
Carrum Patterson Lakes		Lions	Roy Dore Reserve, Carrum	–	2013	2013–	0	–
Casey Thunder		Thunder	The Hunt Club Reserve, Cranbourne East	–	2019	2021–	1	2023
Caulfield Bears		Bears	Koornang Park, Carnegie	–	1993	1993–	1	1994
Chelsea Heights		Demons	Beazley Reserve, Chelsea Heights	SWGFL	1969	1993–	4	2022
Cheltenham		Rosellas	Cheltenham Reserve, Cheltenham	FFL	1891	1982–	7	2025
Clayton		Clays	Meade Reserve, Clayton	FFL, EFNL	1908	1982–1985, 1999–	5	2010
Clyde		Cougars	Clyde Recreation Reserve, Clyde	–	2024	2025–	0	–
Cranbourne		Eagles	Livingston Reserve, Cranbourne East	OEFNL	1889	2022–	1	2022
Dandenong West (Dandenong 2003–23)		Westerners	Greaves Reserve, Dandenong	ESCFA	1964	1984–1986, 1993–	1	2026
Dingley		Dingoes	Souter Oval, Dingley Village	MPNFL	1958	2007–	6	2026
Doveton		Doves	Robinson Oval, Doveton	OEFNL	1959	2022–	0	–
Doveton Eagles		Eagles	Power Reserve, Doveton	VAFA	1980	1995–	4	2017
East Brighton		Vampires	Hurlingham Park, Brighton East	CODFL	1948	1963–	11	2023
East Malvern (Tooronga-Malvern 1973–2011)		Panthers	D.W. Lucas Oval, Malvern East	VAFA	1964	1973–	6	2026
Endeavour Hills		Falcons	Barry Simon Reserve, Endeavour Hills	–	2011	2011–	1	2023
Frankston Dolphins		Dolphins	Overport Park, Frankston South	–	2017	2018–	1	2024
Hallam		Hawks	Hallam Recreation Reserve, Hallam	OEFNL	2011	2012–2022, 2024–	1	2025
Hampton (Hampton United 1993–94)		Hammers	Peterson Street Reserve, Highett	ESCFA	1947	1993–2020, 2022–	2	2025
Hampton Park		Redbacks	Robert Booth Reserve, Hampton Park	SEFNL	1958	2018–	2	2025
Heatherhill		Hawks	Bruce Park, Frankston	–	2023	2023–	0	–
Heatherton		Tunners	Heatherton Recreation Reserve, Heatherton	ESCFA	1913	1993–	4	2026
Highett (Highett Districts 1989–96)		Bulldogs	Turner Road Reserve, Highett	–	1988	1989–	4	2018
Keysborough		Burras	Rowley Allan Reserve, Keysborough	MPNFL	1947	2015–	0	–
Lyndhurst		Lightning	Marriott Waters Reserve, Lyndhurst	–	2009	2016–	1	2022
Lyndale		Pumas	Barry Powell Reserve, Noble Park North	ESCFA	1961	1987–1989, 1993–	3	2000
Moorabbin (Moorabbin West 1978–2002)		Kangaroos	A.W Oliver Reserve, Hampton East	ESCFA	1978	1982, 1993–	3	2012
Mordialloc		Bloodhounds	Ben Kavanagh Reserve, Mordialloc	VFA	1891	1988–	2	2014
Murrumbeena		Lions	Murrumbeena Park, Murrumbeena	CODFL	1918	1963–	5	2024
Narre Warren		Magpies	Kalora Park, Narre Warren North	OEFNL	1953	2025–	0	–
Narre South Saints		Saints	Strathaird Reserve, Narre Warren South	VAFA	2007	2020–	0	–
Pakenham thirds		Lions	Toomuc Reserve, Pakenham	–	1892	2026–	0	–
Port Melbourne Colts		Colts	JL Murphy Reserve, Port Melbourne	WRFL	1957	1975–80, 2016–	2	2016
Skye		Bombers	Carrum Downs Recreation Reserve, Carrum Downs	–	2005	2006–	1	2009
South Mornington		Tigers	Citation Oval, Mount Martha	VAFA	2006	2006, 2020–	1	2023
South Yarra		Lions	Leigh Park, Balwyn North	ESCFA	1967	1993–	3	2019
Springvale Districts		Demons	Springvale Reserve, Springvale	ESCFA	1959	1993–	2	2018
St Kilda City		Saints	Peanut Farm Reserve, St Kilda	NMFL	1946	1965–	9	2010
St John's Old Collegians		JOCS	Thomas Carroll Reserve, Doveton	VAFA	1991	2026–	0	–
St Pauls		Bulldogs	McKinnon Reserve, Bentleigh	ESCFA	1948	1993–	4	2018

=== VAFA ===
Club	Colours	Nickname	Home Ground	Former League(s)	Est.	VAFA Seasons	VAFA Senior Premierships	
Club	Colours	Nickname	Home Ground	Former League(s)	Est.	VAFA Seasons	Total	Most recent
AJAX		Jackas	Gary Smorgon Oval, St Kilda	–	1957	1957	6	2011
Albert Park (ANZ Bank 1954–95, ANZ-Albert Park 1996–98)		Falcons	Ian Johnson Oval, St Kilda	–	1954	1954	0	-
Aquinas Old Collegians		Bloods	Aquinas College, Ringwood	ESCFA	1981	1987	4	2019
Beaumaris		Sharks	Banksia Reserve, Beaumaris	SFNL	1962	1995	6	2025
Box Hill North		Demons	Elgar Park, Mont Albert North	SFNL	1983	2002	0	−
Brunswick (North Old Boys 1963–2015)		NOBS	Gillon Oval, Brunswick	–	1963	1963	3	2012
Canterbury		Cobras	Canterbury Sports Ground, Surrey Hills	EFNL	1881	2014	2	2024
Caulfield Grammarians		Fields	Glenhuntly Oval, Caulfield East	–	1920	1920	10	2019
Chadstone (Syndal-Tally Ho 1997–2008)		Synners	Jordan Reserve, Chadstone	SFNL	1983	1997	0	−
Coburg (Women's team only)		Lions	Barry Plant Park, Coburg	SEWF	2021	2023	0	–
Collegians		Lions	Harry Trott Oval, Albert Park	–	1892	1892	22	2026
De La Salle		DLSOC	Waverley Park, Malvern East	–	1955	1955	11	2003
Eley Park		Sharks	Whitehorse Reserve, Box Hill	SFNL	1992	1994	1	1999
Elsternwick		Wickers	Elsternwick Park, Brighton	FFA	1914	1947	8	2024
Fitzroy		Roy Boys	Brunswick Street Oval, Fitzroy	AFL	1883	2009	1	2018
Glen Eira/Old McKinnon (Glen Eira 1999–2024)		Gryphons	Packer Park, Carnegie	–	1999	1999	1	2023
Hampton Rovers		Rovers	Boss James Reserve, Hampton	NMFL	1933	1933	9	2014
Hawthorn		Hawks	Rathmines Road Reserve, Hawthorn East	SFNL	1954	1954–1957, 1995	1	1998
Kew		Bears	Victoria Park, Kew	VFLSD	1876	2006	9	2015
La Trobe University		Trobers	Tony Sheehan Oval, Bundoora	PHFL	1967	1970	7	2022
Masala Dandenong		Tigers	Lois Twohig Reserve, Dandenong North	–	2013	2013	0	−
Marcellin Old Collegians		Eagles	Bray Oval, Marcellin College, Bulleen	YCWFL	1968	1971	9	2008
Mazenod Old Collegians		Nodders	Central Reserve, Glen Waverley	ESCFA	1978	1989	5	2016
MCC		Demons	Beaumaris Secondary College, Beaumaris	–	2018	2018	1	2023
MHSOB		Unicorns	Woodfull-Miller Oval, South Yarra	–	1928	1928	10	2009
Monash Blues		Blues	Frearson Oval, Clayton	–	1962	1962	5	2022
North Brunswick		Bulls	Allard Park, Brunswick	NMFL	1970	1971	4	2023
Oakleigh		Krushers	WA Scammell Reserve, Oakleigh	–	1991	1991	5	2007
Old Brighton		Tonners	Brighton Beach Oval, Brighton	–	1957	1957	6	2025
Old Camberwell		Wellers	Gordon Barnard Reserve, Balwyn North	–	1960	1960	6	2007
Old Carey Grammarians		Panthers	Carey Sports Complex, Bulleen	–	1954	1954	5	2024
Old Geelong		OGs	Como Park, South Yarra	–	1954	1954	6	2016
Old Haileybury		Bloods	Princes Park, Caulfield South	–	1961	1961	10	2024
Old Ivanhoe Grammarians		Hoers	Chelsworth Park, Ivanhoe	–	1929	1964	8	2023
Old Melburnians		Redlegs	Elsternwick Park, Brighton	–	1920	1920	15	2009
Old Peninsula		Pirates	Harry MacDonald Oval, Mount Eliza	–	1980	1980	1	2025
Old Scotch		Cardinals	Camberwell Sports Ground, Camberwell	–	1921	1921	13	2024
Old Trinity		T's	Daley Oval, Bulleen	–	1923	1954	8	2025
Old Xaverians		Old Xavs	Toorak Park, Armadale	–	1923	1923	20	2016
Old Yarra Cobras		Cobras	Koonung Park, Bulleen	–	2022	2023	0	−
Ormond		Monders	EE Gunn Reserve, Ormond	–	1932	1932	14	2018
Parkdale Vultures		Vultures	Gerry Green Reserve, Parkdale	–	1991	1991	3	2026
Parkside		Devils	Pitcher Park, Alphington	NFNL	1938	2015	6	2023
PEGS (Old Essendon Grammarians 1970–2011)		Bombers	PEGS Sporting Fields, Keilor East	WRFL	1970	1970, 1984	4	2022
Port Melbourne Chargers		Chargers	JL Murphy Reserve, Port Melbourne	–	2025	2025	0	–
Power House		Slushies	Ross Gregory Oval, St Kilda	–	1940	1940	7	2026
Prahran (Prahran Assumption 2011–22)		Two Blues	Toorak Park, Toorak	VFA	1886	1999	3	2024
Preston Bullants (Northern Blues 2012–16)		Bullants	WR Ruthven VC Reserve, Preston	–	2009	2009	3	2026
Richmond Central		Snakes	Kevin Bartlett Reserve, Richmond	–	1987	1987	1	1994
South Melbourne Districts		Bloods	Lindsay Hassett Oval, Albert Park	SFNL	1912	2000	4	2022
St Bedes/Mentone Tigers		Tigers	Mentone Reserve, Mentone	–	1992	1993	4	2008
St Bernard's		Snowdogs	St Bernard's College Oval, Essendon West	–	1963	1963	10	2023
St Kevin's Old Boys		SKOB	TH King Oval, Kooyong	–	1947	1947	7	2022
St Mary's Salesian		Saints	Ferndale Park, Glen Iris	–	2008	2008	1	2025
Swinburne University		Razorbacks	St James Park, Hawthorn	–	1996	1996	1	2003
Therry Penola (Glenroy Amateurs 1974–77, Therry Corpus Christi OB 1978–95)		Lions	JP Fawkner Reserve, Oak Park	–	1977	1977	4	2013
UHS-VU (University High School OB 1932–2001)		Vultures	Brens Oval, Parkville	–	1932	1933	6	2018
University Blacks		Blacks	University Oval, Parkville	VJFL	1919	1920	21	2014
University Blues		Blues	University Oval, Parkville	VJFL	1919	1921	10	2026
Wattle Park (Emmaus-St Leo's 1992–2023)		Animals	Bennettswood Reserve, Burwood	ESCFL	1971	1992	4	2026
West Brunswick		Magpies	Ransford Oval, Parkville	–	1932	1959	9	2025
Westbourne Grammarians 2		Warriors	Westbourne School Ground, Truganina	–	2014	2014–2022, 2024–	2	2025
Whitefriars Old Collegians		Friars	Whitefriars College Oval, Donvale	–	1986	1986	6	2022
Williamstown CYMS		CYs	Fearon Reserve, Williamstown	WSFL	1886	1983	5	2019

=== Western ===
Club	Colours	Nickname	Home Ground	Former League(s)	Est.	WFNL Seasons	WFNL Senior Premierships	
Club	Colours	Nickname	Home Ground	Former League(s)	Est.	WFNL Seasons	Total	Most recent
Albanvale		Cobras	Robert Bruce Reserve, Deer Park	VAFA	1978	1978–1988, 1993–	1	2015
Albion		Cats	JR Parsons Reserve, Sunshine	–	1961	1961–	4	2010
Altona (Altona City 1969–92)		Vikings	JK Grant Reserve, Altona	WSFL	1918	1933–1937, 1945–1951, 1977–1979, 1988–	7	2022
Bacchus Marsh (Thirds side only)		Cobras	Maddingley Park, Maddingley	–	1978	2024–	0	–
Braybrook		Brookers	Pennell Reserve, Braybrook	NDFA	1874	1931–1990, 1990–1997, 1997–	19	2022
Caroline Springs		Lakers	Town Centre Oval, Caroline Springs	–	2002	2011–	2	2026
Glen Orden		Hawks	Heathdale Oval, Werribee	–	1979	1976–2016, 2018–2022, 2024–	4	2019
Hoppers Crossing		Warriors	Hogans Road Reserve, Hoppers Crossing	WSFL	1972	1988–	4	2024
Laverton		Magpies	Laverton Park, Altona Meadows	WSFL	1924	1988–	1	1989
Manor Lakes		Storm	Howqua Reserve, Manor Lakes	–	2012	2013–2019, 2026–	0	–
Newport		Panthers	AW Langshaw Reserve, Altona North	–	2005	2016–	1	2016
North Footscray		Devils	Hansen Reserve, West Footscray	–	1934	1935–	8	2026
North Sunshine		Roadrunners	Dempster Park, Sunshine North	–	1967	1979–	2	2003
Parkside		Magpies	Henry Turner Reserve, Footscray	NMFL	1897	1931–	17	2023
Parkside Spurs		Spurs	Henry Turner Oval, Footscray	NFNL	1993	2023–	1	2026
Point Cook		Bulldogs	Saltwater Reserve, Point Cook	VAFA	2003	2018–	1	2018
Point Cook Centrals (Sanctuary Lakes 2012–17)		Sharks	Featherbrook Reserve, Point Cook	–	2012	2013–	2	2022
Spotswood		Woodsmen	Donald W McLean Reserve, Spotswood	VSDFL	1927	1935–	17	2011
Suns (Wyndham Suns 2014–21)		Suns	Goddard Street Reserve, Tarneit	VAFA	2013	2015–	1	2023
Sunshine (Sunshine YCW 1978–2000)		Kangaroos	Kinder Smith Reserve, Braybrook	YCWNFA	1959	1978–	1	2024
Sunshine Heights		Dragons	Ainsworth Reserve, Sunshine West	WSFL	1971	1988–	3	2008
Tarneit		Titans	Wootten Road Reserve, Tarneit	–	2014	2014–	0	–
Truganina		Thunder	Mainview Oval, Truganina	–	2019	2026–	0	–
West Footscray		Roosters	Skinner Reserve, Braybrook	–	1932	1932–	7	2007
Werribee Centrals (Thirds and women)		Centurions	Galvin Park, Werribee	–	1969	2018–	1	2024
Werribee Districts		Tigers	Soldiers Reserve, Werribee	VAFA	1995	1995–1997, 2014–	2	2025
Western Rams (Rockbank 1992–99)		Rams	Ian Cowie Recreation Reserve, Rockbank	RDFNL	1992	1992–1999, 2024–	0	–
Wyndhamvale		Falcons	Wyndham Vale South Oval, Wyndham Vale	GDFL	1979	1989–1994, 1999–	2	2025
Yarraville Seddon		Eagles	Yarraville Oval, Yarraville	–	2006	2007–	2	2019

== Country leagues ==
=== Ballarat ===
Club	Colours	Nickname	Home Ground	Former League(s)	Est.	BFNL Seasons	BFNL Senior Premierships	
Club	Colours	Nickname	Home Ground	Former League(s)	Est.	BFNL Seasons	Total	Most recent
Bacchus Marsh		Cobras	Maddingley Park, Maddingley	–	1979	1979–	1	2016
Ballarat		Swans	Alfredton Recreation Reserve, Alfredton	VFA	1860	1893–	20	2026
Carisbrook (Women's side only)		Redbacks	Carisbrook Recreation Reserve, Carisbrook	–	1900s	2023–	0	–
Darley		Devils	Darley Park, Darley	RDFNL	1919	1997–	4	2025
East Point		Kangaroos	Eastern Oval, Ballarat East	–	2001	2001–	2	2019
Lake Wendouree		Lakers	C.E. Brown Reserve, Wendouree	–	1994	1995–	1	2010
Melton		Bloods	MacPherson Park, Toolern Vale	RDFNL	1879	1997–	5	2024
North Ballarat		Roosters	Eureka Stadium, Wendouree	VFL	1882	1952–	17	2014
Redan		Lions	City Oval, Lake Wendouree	–	1871	1943–	11	2011
Sebastopol		Burras	Marty Busch Reserve, Sebastopol	BBMFL	1893	1893–95, 1938, 1940, 1950–53, 1978–	0	–
Sunbury		Lions	Clarke Oval, Sunbury	RDFNL	1879	1997–	5	2012

=== Barwon Female Football ===
Club	Colours	Nickname	Home Ground	Former League	Est.	AFL Barwon Seasons	AFL Barwon Senior Premierships	
Club	Colours	Nickname	Home Ground	Former League	Est.	AFL Barwon Seasons	Total	Most recent
Anglesea		Roos	Ellimatta Reserve, Anglesea	—	1963	2021–	2	2024
Barwon Heads		Seagulls	Howard Harmer Reserve, Barwon Heads	—	1922	2018–	1	2018
Barwon Heads reserves/Ocean Grove		Seagulls/Grubbers	Howard Harmer Reserve, Barwon Heads and Shell Road Reserve, Ocean Grove	—	2026	2026–	0	—
Bell Park		Dragons	Hamlyn Park, Bell Park	1958	GDFL	2026–	0	-
Belmont Lions		Lions	Winter Reserve, Belmont	—	1965	2024–	1	2024
Drysdale		Hawks	Drysdale Recreational Reserve, Drysdale	—	1879	2018–	0	—
Geelong Amateur		Ammos, Pegasus	Queens Park, Highton	—	1926	2018–	4	2026
Geelong West Giants		Giants	West Oval, Geelong West	—	2017	2018–	1	2022
Grovedale		Tigers	Burdoo Reserve, Grovedale	—	1947	2018–	1	2024
Lara		Cats	Lara Recreation Reserve, Lara	—	1880	2018–	1	2026
Modewarre		Warriors	Mt Moriac Recreation Reserve, Mount Moriac	—	1879	2023–	1	2023
Portarlington		Demons	Portarlington Recreation Reserve, Portarlington	—	1874	2026–	0	–
South Barwon		Swans	McDonald Reserve, Belmont	—	1990	2021–	1	2025
St Albans/Thomson		Supersaints, Tigers	St Albans Reserve, Thomson and Thomson Recreation Reserve, Thomson	—	2026	2026–	0	–
St Joseph's		Joeys	Herne Hill Reserve, Herne Hill	—	1973	2018–	1	2022
St Mary's		Saints	Kardinia Park West, South Geelong	—	1953	2018–	1	2019
St Mary's reserves/Geelong Amateur reserves		Saints, Ammos, Pegasus	Kardinia Park West, South Geelong and Queens Park, Highton	—	1953	2018–	1	2019
Torquay		Tigers	Spring Creek Reserve, Torquay	—	1952	2019–	0	–

=== Bellarine ===
Club	Colours	Nickname	Home Ground	Former League(s)	Est.	BFNL Seasons	BFNL Senior Premierships	
Club	Colours	Nickname	Home Ground	Former League(s)	Est.	BFNL Seasons	Total	Most recent
Anglesea		Roos	Ellimatta Reserve, Anglesea	GDFL	1963	1973–	4	2025
Barwon Heads		Seagulls	Howard Harmer Reserve, Barwon Heads	GDFL	1922	1971–	6	2022
Drysdale		Hawks	Drysdale Recreational Reserve, Drysdale	GDFL	1879	1971–	5	2010
Geelong Amateur		Ammos, Pegasus	Queens Park, Highton	GDFL	1926	1995–	5	2016
Modewarre		Warriors	Mt Moriac Recreation Reserve, Mount Moriac	GDFL	1879	1996–	1	2018
Newcomb		Power	Grinter Reserve, Moolap	—	1975	1976–	6	2007
Ocean Grove		Grubbers	Shell Road Reserve, Ocean Grove	PFL	1964	1971–	8	2003
Portarlington		Demons	Portarlington Recreation Reserve, Portarlington	PFL	1874	1971–	2	1992
Queenscliff		Coutas	Queenscliff Recreation Reserve, Queenscliff	PFL	1884	1971–	5	2026
Surf Coast Suns		Suns	Banyul-Warri Fields Sporting Precinct, Torquay	—	2016	2026–	0	—
Torquay		Tigers	Spring Creek Reserve, Torquay	PFL	1952	1971–	10	2024

=== Bendigo ===
Club	Colours	Nickname	Home Ground	Former League(s)	Est.	BFNL Seasons	BFNL Senior Premierships	
Club	Colours	Nickname	Home Ground	Former League(s)	Est.	BFNL Seasons	Total	Most recent
Broadford		Kangaroos	Harley Hammond Reserve, Broadford	OEFNL	1890	2024–	0	–
Castlemaine		Magpies	Camp Reserve, Castlemaine	CFL, MFL	1859	1925–	5	2000
Eaglehawk		Hawks; Two Blues	Canterbury Park, Eaglehawk	–	1880	1880–	28	2025
Gisborne		Bulldogs	Gardiner Reserve, Gisborne	RDFNL	1879	2000–	6	2026
Golden Square		Bulldogs	Wade Street Recreation Reserve, Golden Square	GCFL	1932	1935–	18	2023
Kangaroo Flat		Kangaroos	Dower Park, Kangaroo Flat	GCFL	1890	1981–	1	1996
Sandhurst		Dragons	Queen Elizabeth Oval, Bendigo	–	1861	1880–	28	2024
South Bendigo		Bloods	Harry Trott Oval, Kennington	–	1893	1893–	24	1994
Strathfieldsaye		Storm	Strathfieldsaye Recreation Reserve, Strathfieldsaye	–	2007	2009–	4	2019

=== Central Highlands ===
Club	Colours	Nickname	Home Ground	Former League(s)	Est.	CHFL Seasons	CHFL Senior Premierships	
Club	Colours	Nickname	Home Ground	Former League(s)	Est.	CHFL Seasons	Total	Most recent
Ballan		Blues	Ballan Recreation Reserve, Ballan	BBMFL	1881	1979–	2	1981
Beaufort		Crows	Goldfields Recreation Reserve, Beaufort	BFL	1880	1994–	3	2018
Bungaree		Demons	Bungaree Recreation Reserve, Bungaree	CFL	1897	1979–	2	2014
Buninyong		Bombers	Buninyong Recreation Reserve, Buninyong	BBMFL	1874	1979–	1	2002
Carngham Linton		Saints	Carngham Recreation Reserve, Snake Valley	LPFL	1969	2011–	0	–
Clunes		Magpies	Ligar Street Reserve, Clunes	CFL	1869	1979–	3	1997
Creswick		Wickers	Doug Lindsay Reserve, Creswick	CFL	1869	1979–	1	1987
Daylesford		Bulldogs	Victoria Park, Daylesford	BFL	1877	2006–	5	2026
Dunnstown		Towners	Dunnstown Recreation Reserve, Dunnstown	BBMFL	1894	1979–	3	1999
Gordon		Eagles	Gordon Recreation Reserve, Gordon	BBMFL	1895	1979–	3	2023
Hepburn		Burras	Hepburn Recreation Reserve, Hepburn	CFL	1919	1979–	9	2017
Learmonth		Lakies	Learmonth Recreation Reserve, Learmonth	CFL	1889	1979–	0	–
Newlyn		Cats	Newlyn Recreation Reserve, Newlyn	CFL	1900	1979–	2	2003
Rokewood Corindhap		Grasshoppers	Rokewood Recreation Reserve, Rokewood	LPFL	1932	2011–	0	–
Skipton		Emus	Skipton Recreation Reserve, Skipton	LPFL	1873	2011–	1	2025
Springbank		Tigers	Wallace Recreation Reserve, Wallace	CFL	1925	1979–	5	2016
Waubra		Roos	Waubra Recreation Reserve, Waubra	CFL	1910	1979–	4	2019

=== Central Murray ===
Club	Colours	Moniker	Home venue	Former League	Est.	Years in CMFNL	CMFNL premierships	
Club	Colours	Moniker	Home venue	Former League	Est.	Years in CMFNL	Total	Most recent
Cohuna Kangas		Kangas	Cohuna Recreation Reserve, Cohuna, Victoria	—	1996	1997–	0	–
Kerang (Kerang Rovers-Appin 1996–99)		Blues	Riverside Park, Kerang, Victoria	–	1996	1997–	10	2023
Lake Boga		Magpies	Lake Boga Community Park, Lake Boga, Victoria	NDFL	1892	1946–	6	2003
Mallee Eagles (Lalbert 1947–?)		Eagles	Lalbert Recreation Reserve, Lalbert, Victoria	NDFL	1904 (Note: as Lalbert)	1947–	6	1996
Murrabit		Blues	Murrabit Recreation Reserve, Murrabit, Victoria	GRFL	1919	2026–	0	–
Nyah-Nyah West United		Demons	Nyah Recreation Reserve, Nyah, Victoria	–	1978	1978–	4	2026
Swan Hill		Swans	Swan Hill Showgrounds, Swan Hill, Victoria	NDFL	1941	1947–	19	2011
Tooleybuc Manangatang		Saints	Tooleybuc Recreation Reserve, Tooleybuc, New South Wales and Manangatang Recreation Reserve, Manangatang, Victoria	–	2004	2004–	1	2007
Tyntynder		Bulldogs	Alan Garden Reserve, Swan Hill, Victoria	NDFL	1919	1947–	13	1999
Ultima		Storm	Ultima Recreation Reserve, Ultima, Victoria	NDFL, GRFL	1905	1947–1954, 2026–	0	–
Wandella		Bombers	Wandella Recreation Reserve, Wandella, Victoria	GRFL	1922	2026–	0	–
Woorinen		Tigers	Woorinen Recreation Reserve, Woorinen, Victoria	MMFA	1919	1946–	11	2025

=== Central Victoria ===
Club	Colours	Nickname	Home Ground	Former League(s)	Est.	CVFL Seasons	CVFL Senior Premierships	
Club	Colours	Nickname	Home Ground	Former League(s)	Est.	CVFL Seasons	Total	Most recent
Bendigo		Thunder	Weeroona Oval, Bendigo	NCWL	2011	2018–	1	2018
Castlemaine		Magpies	Camp Reserve, Castlemaine	–	1859	2022–	5	2026
Eaglehawk		Hawks; Two Blues	Canterbury Park, Eaglehawk	–	1880	2019–	0	–
Golden Square		Bulldogs	Wade Street Recreation Reserve, Golden Square	–	1932	2019–	1	2019
Marong		Panthers	Malone Park, Marong	–	1900s	2024–	0	–
Sandhurst		Dragons	Queen Elizabeth Oval, Bendigo	–	1861	2024–	0	–
Wedge-Tailed Eagles		Eagles; Wedgies	Racecourse Reserve, Woodend	EDFL (Note: Competed as Gisborne–Kyneton United under a merged operation with Gisborne Football Netball Club.)	2024	2026–	0	–
White Hills		Demons	White Hills Recreation Reserve, White Hills	–	1924	2024–	0	–

=== Colac & District ===
Club	Colours	Nickname	Home Ground	Former League	Est.	CDFNL seasons	CDFNL Senior Premierships	
Club	Colours	Nickname	Home Ground	Former League	Est.	CDFNL seasons	Total	Most recent
Alvie		Swans	Alvie Recreation Reserve, Alvie	CCFA	1922	1937–	14	2025
Apollo Bay		Hawks	Apollo Bay Recreation Reserve, Apollo Bay	PFL	c. 1900s	1971–	6	2004
Birregurra		Saints	Birregurra Recreation Reserve, Birregurra	PRDFA	1883	1967–	6	2017
Colac Imperials		Imperials	Western Reserve, Colac	PFL	1922	1937–1949, 1955	12	1995
Irrewarra-Beeac		Bombers	Irrewarra Recreation Reserve, Irrewarra	—	1982	1983–	3	2010
Lorne		Dolphins	Stribling Reserve, Lorne	PFL	1896	1971–	15	2026
Otway Districts		Demons	Gellibrand Recreation Reserve, Gellibrand	HMNFL	1981	1982–	0	—
Simpson		Tigers	Simpson Recreation Reserve, Simpson	HMNFL	1965	2003–	2	2015
South Colac		Kangaroos	Joiner Reserve, Elliminyt	—	1951	1951–	6	2022
Western Eagles		Eagles	Irrewillipe Recreation Reserve, Irrewillipe	—	1996	1996–	0	—

=== East Gippsland ===
Club	Colours	Nickname	Home Ground	Former League(s)	Est.	FNEG Seasons	FNEG Senior Premierships	
Club	Colours	Nickname	Home Ground	Former League(s)	Est.	FNEG Seasons	Total	Most recent
Boisdale Briagolong		Bombers	Boisdale Recreation Reserve, Boisdale	NGFNL	1982	2015–	1	2024
Lakes Entrance		Seagulls	Lakes Entrance Recreation Reserve, Lakes Entrance	GFL	1891	1974–	4	2003
Lindenow		Cats	Lindenow Recreation Reserve, Lindenow	GFL	1900s	1974–	9	2026
Lucknow		Magpies	Lucknow Recreation Reserve, Lucknow	BDFL	1951	1974–	3	2012
Orbost-Snowy Rovers		Blues	Lochiel Street Reserve, Orbost	–	2003	2003–	0	–
Paynesville		Gulls	AJ Freeman Reserve, Paynesville	RFL	1920	1974–1985, 2004–	2	2013
Stratford		Swans	Stratford Recreation Reserve, Stratford	NGFNL	1900	2012—	3	2022
Wy Yung		Tigers	Bullumwaal Road Recreation Reserve, Wy Yung	BDFL	1920	1974–	6	2025

=== Ellinbank & District ===
Club	Colours	Nickname	Home Ground	Former League(s)	Est.	EDFNL Seasons	EDFNL Senior Premierships	
Club	Colours	Nickname	Home Ground	Former League(s)	Est.	EDFNL Seasons	Total	Most recent
Buln Buln		Lyrebirds	Buln Buln Recreation Reserve, Buln Buln	NDFL	1919	1949–	12	2024
Bunyip		Bulldogs	Bunyip Showgrounds, Bunyip	WGFNC	1879	1982–2016, 2025–	3	2012
Catani		Blues	Catani Recreation Reserve, Catani	WGFL		1976–	4	2017
Ellinbank		Eagles	Ellinbank Recreation Reserve, Warragul South	WDJFA		1937–	15	1995
Lang Lang		Tigers	Lang Lang Community Recreation Precinct, Caldermeade	WGFL	1895	2000–	0	—
Longwarry		Crows	Longwarry Recreation Reserve, Longwarry	WGFL	1900s	1993–	2	2026
Neerim-Neerim South		Cats	Neerim South Recreation Reserve, Neerim South	–	1954	1954–	9	2025
Nilma Darnum (Nilma Lillico 1947–76)		Bombers	Darnum Recreation Reserve, Darnum	–	1947	1947–	5	2009
Nyora		Saints	Nyora Recreation Reserve, Nyora	BVWDFL	1880s	1967–	4	2018
Poowong		Magpies	Poowong Recreation Reserve, Poowong	SGFL	1900s	1967–	9	2003
Trafalgar		Bloods	Trafalgar Recreation Reserve, Trafalgar	MGFNL	1888	2021–	0	—
Yarragon		Panthers	Dowton Park Reserve, Yarragon	MGFNL	1895	2019–	0	—

=== Female Football Gippsland ===
Club	Colours	Nickname	Home Ground	Former League(s)	Est.	FFG Seasons	FFG Senior Premierships	
Club	Colours	Nickname	Home Ground	Former League(s)	Est.	FFG Seasons	Total	Most recent
Boisdale Briagolong		Bombers	Boisdale Recreation Reserve, Boisdale	—	1982	2018–2021, 2023–	5	2026
Lindenow South		Swampies, Swamp Hawks	Lindenow South Rec. Reserve, Lindenow South	—	1902	2021–	1	2024
Meeniyan Dumbalk United		Demons	Meeniyan Recreation Reserve, Meeniyan	—	1964	2026–	0	–
Moe (Moe Newborough 2021–25)		Lions	Ted Summerton Reserve, Moe	—	2021	2021–	1	2022
Nar Nar Goon		Goons	Nar Nar Goon Recreation Reserve, Nar Nar Goon	—	c. 1900	2026–	0	–
Woodside & District		Wildcats	Woodside Recreation Reserve, Woodside	–	2008	2026–	0	–

=== Geelong ===
Club	Colours	Nickname	Home Ground	Former League(s)	Est.	GFNL Seasons	GFNL Senior Premierships	
Club	Colours	Nickname	Home Ground	Former League(s)	Est.	GFNL Seasons	Total	Most recent
Bell Park		Dragons	Hamlyn Park, Bell Park	GDFL	1958	1979–	4	2011
Colac		Tigers	Central Reserve, Colac	HFL	1948	2001–	1	2014
Grovedale		Tigers	Burdoo Reserve, Grovedale	GDFL	1947	1979–	0	—
Geelong West		Giants	West Oval, Geelong West	—	2017	2017–	0	—
Leopold		Lions	Leopold Memorial Park, Leopold	BFL	1955	1992–	3	2024
Newtown & Chilwell		Eagles	Elderslie Reserve, Newtown	GDFL	1933	1979–	3	1986
North Shore		Seagulls	Windsor Park, North Shore	GDFL	1927	1979–	11	2000
South Barwon		Swans	McDonald Reserve, Belmont	—	1990	1990–	8	2013
St Albans		Supersaints	St Albans Reserve, Thomson	GDFL	1880	1979–	2	1988
St Joseph's		Joeys	Herne Hill Reserve, Herne Hill	GDFL	1973	1985–	4	2018
St Mary's		Saints	Kardinia Park West, South Geelong	GDFL	1953	1979–	8	2026

=== Geelong & District ===
Club	Colours	Nickname	Home Ground	Former League(s)	Est.	GDFNL Seasons	GDFNL Senior Premierships	
Club	Colours	Nickname	Home Ground	Former League(s)	Est.	GDFNL Seasons	Total	Most recent
Anakie		Roos	Anakie Reserve, Anakie	EC	1897	1949	4	1994
Bannockburn		Tigers	Victoria Park, Bannockburn	EC	1878	1953	6	2022
Bell Post Hill		Panthers	Myers Reserve, Bell Post Hill	—	1976	1977	7	2017
Belmont Lions (St Bernards 1965–73, East Belmont 1974–97)		Lions	Winter Reserve, Belmont	—	1965	1965	1	2007
Corio		Devils	Shell Reserve, Corio	—	1974	1974	1	1995
East Geelong (Eastern Suburbs 1980–99)		Eagles	Richmond Oval, East Geelong	—	1879	1879^{+}	25	2026
Geelong West		Giants	West Oval, Geelong West	—	2017	2017	0	—
Inverleigh (Leigh Districts 1970–95)		Hawks	Inverleigh Recreation Reserve, Inverleigh	—	1970	1970	2	2023
North Geelong		Magpies	Osborne Park, North Geelong	—	1876	1879^{+}	22	2025
Thomson		Tigers	Thomson Recreation Reserve, Thomson	—	1953	1957	11	2024
Werribee Centrals		Centurions	Galvin Park Reserve, Werribee	WSFL	1969	1984	7	2004
Winchelsea		Blues	Eastern Reserve, Winchelsea	WBFA	1876	1921	0	—

=== Gippsland ===
Club	Colours	Nickname	Home Ground	Former League(s)	Est.	GL/GLFL/LVFL Seasons	GL/GLFL/LVFL Senior Premierships	
Club	Colours	Nickname	Home Ground	Former League(s)	Est.	GL/GLFL/LVFL Seasons	Total	Most recent
Bairnsdale		Redlegs	Bairnsdale City Oval, Bairnsdale	EGFNL	1900	2011–	0	–
Drouin		Hawks	Drouin Recreation Reserve, Drouin	WGFL	1890	1960–	0	–
Leongatha		Parrots	Leongatha Recreation Reserve, Leongatha	SGFL	1894	1969–	12	2025
Maffra		Eagles	Maffra Recreation Reserve, Maffra	GFL	1901	1960–	9	2019
Moe		Lions	Ted Summerton Reserve, Moe	CGFL	1909	1954–	3	2026
Morwell		Tigers	Morwell Recreation Reserve, Morwell	CGFL	1905	1954–	9	2014
Sale		Magpies	Sale Oval, Sale	GFL	1901	1954–	10	2012
Traralgon		Maroons	Traralgon Recreation Reserve, Traralgon	VFL	1883	1954–	21	2024
Warragul		Gulls	Western Park Reserve, Warragul	WGFL	1879	1954–	4	1984
Wonthaggi		Power	Wonthaggi Recreation Reserve, Wonthaggi	AFNL	2005	2010–	0	–

=== Goulburn Murray Women ===
Club	Colours	Nickname	Home Ground	Former League	Est.	GMW Seasons	GMW Senior Premierships	
Club	Colours	Nickname	Home Ground	Former League	Est.	GMW Seasons	Total	Most recent
Cobram		Tigers	Scott Reserve, Cobram, Victoria	GVFA	1887	2026–	0	–
Mansfield		Eagles	Mansfield Recreation Reserve, Mansfield	–	1880s	2024–	0	–
Moama		Magpies	Moama Recreation Reserve, Moama, New South Wales	NEFL	1892	2026–	0	–
Nathalia		Purples	Nathalia Recreation Reserve, Nathalia	–	1887	2018–	2	2022
Rumbalara		Rumba	Rumbalara Recreation Reserve, Shepparton	–	1997	2018–2019, 2024–	0	–
Shepparton United		Demons	Deakin Reserve, Shepparton	–	1950	2022–	2	2026
Tatura		Bulldogs	Tatura Recreation Reserve, Tatura	–	1894	2019–	0	–

=== Goulburn Valley ===
Club	Colours	Nickname	Home Ground	Former League(s)	Est.	GVFL Seasons	GVFL Senior Premierships	
Club	Colours	Nickname	Home Ground	Former League(s)	Est.	GVFL Seasons	Total	Most recent
Benalla		Saints	Benalla Showgrounds, Benalla	OMFL	1896	1940, 1997–	2	2015
Echuca		Bombers	Victoria Park, Echuca	BFL	1876	1909–1923, 1974–	9	2026
Euroa		Magpies	Euroa Memorial Oval, Euroa	WNEFL	1880	1939–1940, 1971–	2	1990
Kyabram		Bombers	Kyabram Recreation Reserve, Kyabram	–	1886	1894–	16	2025
Mansfield		Eagles	Mansfield Recreation Reserve, Mansfield	WNEFL	1880s	1998–	2	2009
Mooroopna		Cats	Mooroopna Recreation Reserve, Mooroopna	CGVFL	1877	1894–1938, 1949–	11	1986
Rochester		Tigers	Rochester Recreation Reserve, Rochester	BFL	1874	1913–1914, 1973–	4	2008
Seymour		Lions	Kings Park, Seymour	WNEFL	1880	1939–1946, 1976–	7	2007
Shepparton		Bears	Deakin Reserve, Shepparton	CGVFL	1880s	1894–1938, 1949–	27	2018
Shepparton Swans (Lemnos 1946–98)		Swans	Princess Park, Shepparton	GVFA	1928	1946–	4	2014
Shepparton United (City United 1950–65)		Demons	Deakin Reserve, Shepparton	–	1950	1950–	12	2011
Tatura		Bulldogs	Tatura Recreation Reserve, Tatura	–	1894	1894–	12	2012

=== Hampden ===
Club	Colours	Nickname	Home Ground	Former League(s)	Est.	HFNL Seasons	HFNL Senior Premierships	
Club	Colours	Nickname	Home Ground	Former League(s)	Est.	HFNL Seasons	Total	Most recent
Camperdown		Magpies	Leura Oval, Camperdown	WDFL	1877	1930–	6	2000
Cobden		Bombers	Cobden Recreation Reserve, Cobden	WDFL	1879	1930–	6	1998
Hamilton Kangaroos		Kangaroos	Melville Oval, Hamilton	–	2012	2013–	0	–
Koroit		Saints	Victoria Park, Koroit	WDFL	1886	1961–	13	2026
North Warrnambool		Eagles	Bushfield Recreation Reserve, Bushfield	WDFNL	1986	1997–	1	2025
Portland		Tigers	Hanlon Park, Portland	WBFL	1876	2013–	0	–
Port Fairy		Seagulls	Gardens Oval, Port Fairy	WDFL	1868	1949–	1	1958
South Warrnambool		Roosters	Friendly Societies Park, Warrnambool	WDFL	1902	1933–	13	2024
Terang Mortlake		Bloods	Terang Recreation Reserve, Terang and D.C. Farran Oval, Mortlake	–	2001	2001–	3	2008
Warrnambool		Blues	Reid Oval, Warrnambool	WDFL	1861	1933–	25	2013

=== Heathcote District ===
Club	Colours	Nickname	Home Ground(s)	Former League(s)	Est.	HDFNL Seasons	HDFNL Senior Premierships	
Club	Colours	Nickname	Home Ground(s)	Former League(s)	Est.	HDFNL Seasons	Total	Most recent
Colbinabbin		Grasshoppers	MJ Morgan Reserve, Colbinabbin	CVFA	1915	1935–	12	2008
Elmore		Bloods	Elmore Recreation Reserve, Elmore	EFL	1882	1938–1939, 1948–	5	2007
Heathcote		Saints	Barrack Reserve, Heathcote	–	1967	1967–	7	2010
Huntly (Provincial-Huntly 1986)		Hawks	Strauch Reserve, Huntly	–	1986	1986–	0	–
Leitchville Gunbower		Bombers	Leitchville Recreation Reserve, Leitchville and Gunbower Recreation Reserve, Gunbower	CMFNL	1995	2010–	2	2018
Lockington Bamawm United		Cats	Lockington Recreation Reserve, Lockington	BFNL	1990	2001–	5	2022
Mount Pleasant		Blues	Toolleen Recreation Reserve, Toolleen	CVFA	1889	1935–	21	2025
North Bendigo		Bulldogs	North Bendigo Recreation Reserve, North Bendigo	BFNL	1945	1996–	4	2026
White Hills		Demons	White Hills Recreation Reserve, White Hills	BFNL	1924	1984–	2	2024

=== Horsham & District ===
Club	Colours	Nickname	Home Ground(s)	Former League(s)	Est.	HDFNL Seasons	HDFNL Senior Premierships	
Club	Colours	Nickname	Home Ground(s)	Former League(s)	Est.	HDFNL Seasons	Total	Most recent
Edenhope-Apsley		Saints	Edenhope Showgrounds, Edenhope	KNTFL	1999	2007–	0	–
Harrow Balmoral		Kangaroos	Harrow & District Recreation Reserve, Harrow and Balmoral Recreation Reserve, Balmoral	–	1997	1997–	9	2025
Kalkee		Kees	Kalkee Recreation Reserve, Kalkee	CWFL	1890	1945–1948, 1954–1958, 1960–	15	2012
Kaniva Leeor United		Cougars	Kaniva Recreation Reserve, Kaniva	KNTFL	1996	2020–	0	–
Laharum		Demons, Mountain Men	Cameron Oval, Laharum	CWFL	1923	1936–	11	2026
Natimuk United		Rams	Natimuk Showgrounds, Natimuk	–	2014	2014–	0	–
Noradjuha-Quantong		Bombers	Quantong Recreation Reserve, Quantong	–	1997	1997–	0	–
Pimpinio		Tigers	Pimpinio Sporting Complex, Pimpinio	CWFL	1909	1968–	2	2006
Rupanyup		Panthers	Rupanyup Recreation Reserve, Rupanyup	WFNL	1870s	1981–	8	2022
Swifts		Baggies	North Park, Stawell	ADFA	1913	2000–	2	2014
Taylors Lake		Lakers	Green Lake Recreation Reserve, Drung	–	1946	1946–	1	1952

=== Kowree-Naracoorte-Tatiara ===
Club	Jumper	Nickname	Home Ground	Former League	Est.	Years in comp	KNTFL Senior Premierships	
Club	Jumper	Nickname	Home Ground	Former League	Est.	Years in comp	Total	Years
Border Districts		Eagles	Frances Recreation Reserve, Frances, Goroke Recreation Reserve, Goroke and Apsley Recreation Reserve Apsley	KNFL	1951	1993–	1	2023

=== Kyabram & District ===
Club	Colours	Nickname	Home Ground	Former League(s)	Est.	kDFNL Seasons	KDFNL Senior Premierships	
Club	Colours	Nickname	Home Ground	Former League(s)	Est.	kDFNL Seasons	Total	Most recent
Avenel		Swans	Avenel Recreation Reserve, Avenel	WNEFL	1881	1976–	6	1994
Girgarre		Kangaroos	Girgarre Recreation Reserve, Girgarre	KDJFA	1920	1932–38, 1940, 1944–47, 1949–	4	1991
Lancaster		Wombats	Lancaster Recreation Reserve, Lancaster	KDJFA	1910	1932–	11	2023
Longwood		Redlegs	Longwood Recreation Reserve, Longwood	BDFNL	1888	2010–	0	–
Merrigum		Bulldogs	Merrigum Recreation Reserve, Merrigum	KDJFA	1902	1933–1939, 1946–	9	2015
Murchison-Toolamba (Murchison 1964–2016)		Grasshoppers	Murchison Recreation Reserve, Murchison	GVFL	1881	1964–	6	2025
Nagambie		Lakers	Nagambie Recreation Reserve, Nagambie	GVFL	1881	1965–	14	2026
Rushworth		Tigers	Rushworth Recreation Reserve, Rushworth	HDFNL	1882	1998–	1	2004
Shepparton East		Eagles	Central Park Recreation Reserve, Shepparton East	PDFNL	1924	1956–1961, 2019–	4	1961
Stanhope		Lions	Stanhope Recreation Reserve, Stanhope	HDFNL	1920	1933–1945, 1995–	7	2008
Tallygaroopna		Redlegs	Tallygaroopna Recreation Reserve, Tallygaroopna	PDFNL	1904	1958–	6	2018
Undera		Lions	Undera Recreation Reserve, Undera	CGVFL	1888	1940–47, 1953–	7	2009
Violet Town		Towners	Violet Town Recreation Reserve, Violet Town	CGFL	1880	2006–	1	2012

=== Limestone Coast ===
Club	Colours	Nickname	Home Ground	Former League	Est.	LCFNL Seasons	LCFNL Senior Premierships	
Club	Colours	Nickname	Home Ground	Former League	Est.	LCFNL Seasons	Total	Most recent
Casterton-Sandford		Cats	Island Park, Casterton	WBFL	2014	2024–	0	–

=== Limestone Coast Women's ===
Club	Colours	Nickname	Home Ground	Former League	Est.	LCFNL Seasons	LCWFL Senior Premierships	
Club	Colours	Nickname	Home Ground	Former League	Est.	LCFNL Seasons	Total	Most recent
Casterton-Sandford		Cats	Island Park, Casterton	–	2014	2019–	2	2025

=== Loddon Valley ===
Club	Colours	Nickname	Home Ground	Former League	Est.	LVFNL Seasons	LVFNL Senior Premierships	
Club	Colours	Nickname	Home Ground	Former League	Est.	LVFNL Seasons	Total	Most recent
Bears Lagoon Serpentine	(1945-2000s)(2000s-)	Bears	Serpentine Recreation Reserve, Serpentine	–	1945	1945–	12	1995
Bridgewater		Mean Machines	Bridgewater Recreation Reserve, Bridgewater on Loddon	GCFL	1890s	1931–	23	2026
Calivil United		Demons	Calivil Recreation Reserve, Calivil and Raywood Recreation Reserve, Raywood	–	1996	1997–	8	2017
Inglewood		Blues	Inglewood Recreation Reserve, Inglewood	IDFL	1876	1938–	9	1986
Macorna		Tigers	Macorna Recreation Reserve, Macorna	GRFL	1888	2026–	0	–
Maiden Gully YCW (YCW 1985–2016)	(1985–2016)(2017–)	Eagles	Marist College Bendigo, Maiden Gully	BFNL	1945	1985–	4	2002
Marong		Panthers	Malone Park, Marong	BFNL	1900s	1983–	5	2025
Mitiamo		Superoos	Mitiamo Recreation Reserve, Mitiamo	MDFL	1890s	1956–	6	2019
Newbridge (Newbridge-Laanecoorie 1947)		Maroons	Newbridge Recreation Reserve, Newbridge	–	1904	1904–	16	2018
Pyramid Hill		Bulldogs	Mitchell Park, Pyramid Hill	NEFL	1890	1995–	0	–

=== Maryborough Castlemaine ===
Club	Colours	Nickname	Home Ground	Former League	Est.	MCDFNL Seasons	MCDFNL Senior Premierships	
Club	Colours	Nickname	Home Ground	Former League	Est.	MCDFNL Seasons	Total	Most recent
Avoca		Bulldogs	Avoca Recreation Reserve, Avoca	LPFL	1873	2005–	0	-
Campbells Creek		Magpies, Creekers	Campbells Creek Recreation Reserve, Campbells Creek	CFL	1864	1952–	1	1953
Carisbrook		Redbacks	Carisbrook Recreation Reserve, Carisbrook	–	1900s	1901, 1919–	18	2018
Dunolly		Eagles	Dunolly Recreation Reserve, Dunolly	LVFL	1873	1919–1981, 2004–	14	1969
Harcourt		Lions	Harcourt Recreation Reserve, Harcourt	GCFL	1900s	1970–	8	2026
Lexton		Tigers	Lexton Recreation Reserve, Lexton	LPFL	1920	2011–	0	-
Maldon		Bombers	Bill Woodful Reserve, Maldon	GCFL	1873	1952–	9	2010
Maryborough Giants		Giants	JH Hedges Memorial Park, Maryborough	–	2023	2024–	0	–
Natte-Bealiba		Swans	Natte Yallock Recreation Reserve, Natte Yallock	LPFL	1961	2011–	3	2024
Navarre		Grasshoppers	Navarre Recreation Reserve, Navarre	LPFL	1920	2011–	4	2016
Newstead		Kangaroos	Newstead Recreation Reserve, Newstead	CFL	1881	1960	7	2009
Talbot		Hawks	Talbot Recreation Reserve, Talbot	CFL	1870s	1956–	7	2001
Trentham		Saints	Trentham Recreation Reserve, Trentham	RDFNL	1892	1988–	3	2025

=== Mid Gippsland ===
Club	Colours	Nickname	Home Ground	Former League	Est.	MGFNL Seasons	MGFNL Senior Premierships	
Club	Colours	Nickname	Home Ground	Former League	Est.	MGFNL Seasons	Total	Most recent
Boolarra		Demons	Boolarra Recreation Reserve, Boolarra	MYJFA	1885	1935–	4	2011
Fish Creek		Kangaroos	John Terrill Memorial Park, Fish Creek	AFNL	1891	2021–	3	2026
Foster		Tigers	Foster Showgrounds, Foster	AFNL	1890	2021–	1	2025
Hill End		Rovers, Hillmen	Willow Grove Recreation Reserve, Willow Grove	–	1946	1946–	5	1981
Meeniyan Dumbalk United		Demons	Meeniyan Recreation Reserve, Meeniyan	AFNL	1964	2021–	0	–
Mirboo North		Tigers	Walter J Tuck Reserve, Mirboo North	SGFL	1900	1955–1957, 1969–	7	2017
Morwell East		Hawks	Ronald Reserve, Morwell	–	1973	1973–	3	2005
Newborough		Bulldogs	Northern Reserve, Newborough	GL	1957	1957–1978, 1986–	10	2016
Stony Creek		Lions	Stony Creek Racecourse, Stony Creek	AFNL	1894	2021–	0	–
Tarwin		Sharks	Tarwin Lower Recreation Reserve, Tarwin Lower	AFNL	1988	2021–	0	–
Thorpdale		Blues	Thorpdale Recreation Reserve, Thorpdale	–	1887	1936–	5	1985
Toora		Magpies	Toora Recreation Reserve, Toora	AFNL	1891	2021–	0	–
Yinnar		Magpies	Yinnar Recreation Reserve, Yinnar	MYJFA	1883	1935–	14	2022

=== Millewa ===
Club	Colours	Nickname	Home Ground	Former League	Est.	MFNL Seasons	MFNL Senior Premierships	
Club	Colours	Nickname	Home Ground	Former League	Est.	MFNL Seasons	Total	Most recent
Bambill		Saints	Mildura Senior College, Mildura	–	1920s	1927–	31	2026
Cardross		Lions	Cardross Recreational Reserve, Cardross	SFNL	1948	1962–	3	1972
Meringur (Meringur-South Merbein 1988–95)		Kangaroos	Johansen Memorial Reserve, Cullulleraine	–	1926	1926–36, 1949–2011, 2013–	9	1964
Nangiloc		Demons	Nangiloc Recreational Reserve, Nangiloc	–	1975	1975–	8	2018
Werrimull		Magpies	Johansen Memorial Reserve, Cullulleraine	–	1926	1926–	20	2025

=== Mininera & District ===
Club	Colours	Nickname	Home Ground	Former League	Est.	MDFL Seasons	MDFL Senior Premierships	
Club	Colours	Nickname	Home Ground	Former League	Est.	MDFL Seasons	Total	Most recent
Ararat Eagles		Eagles	Alexandra Oval, Ararat	HDFNL	2000	2011–	1	2022
Caramut		Swans	Caramut Recreation Reserve, Caramut	PFFL	1882	1965–	3	1999
Glenthompson Dunkeld		Rams	Dunkeld Recreation Reserve, Dunkeld	–	2004	2004–	1	2010
Great Western		Lions	Central Park, Great Western	HDFNL	1880s	2012	1	2019
Hawkesdale Macarthur		Eagles	Hawkesdale Recreation Reserve, Hawkesdale and Macarthur Recreation Reserve, Macarthur	–	1997	1997–	0	–
Lismore Derrinallum		Demons	Lismore Recreation Reserve, Lismore and Derrinallum Recreation Reserve, Derrinallum	–	1999	1999–	4	2026
Moyston Willaura		Pumas	Moyston Recreation Reserve, Moyston and Willaura Recreation Reserve, Willaura	–	2000	2000–	1	2014
Penshurst		Bombers	Penshurst Recreation Reserve, Penshurst	PFFL	1874	1970–	12	2024
SMW Rovers		Bulldogs	Conna Wilson Reserve, Mininera	–	1954	1954–	8	2004
Tatyoon		Hawks	Tatyoon Recreation Reserve, Tatyoon	–	1924	1924–	12	2023
Wickliffe-Lake Bolac		Magpies	Lake Bolac Recreation Reserve, Lake Bolac	–	1986	1986–	9	2018
Woorndoo-Mortlake		Tigers	Woorndoo Recreation Reserve, Woorndoo and DC Farran Oval, Mortlake	–	2001	2001–	0	–

=== Mornington Peninsula ===
Club	Colours	Nickname	Home Ground	Former League	Est.	MPFNL Seasons	MPFNL Senior Premierships	
Club	Colours	Nickname	Home Ground	Former League	Est.	MPFNL Seasons	Total	Most recent
Bass Coast		Breakers	Dalyston Recreation Reserve, Dalyston	SEWF	2017	2024–	1	2018
Bonbeach		Sharks	Bonbeach Sports Reserve, Bonbeach	NFL	1961	1987–	0	–
Chelsea		Seagulls	Chelsea Recreation Reserve, Chelsea	MPFL	1919	1987–	4	2006
Crib Point		Magpies	Crib Point Recreation Reserve, Crib Point	NFL	1931	1987–	1	2001
Devon Meadows		Panthers	Glover Reserve, Devon Meadows	SWGFL	1977	1995–	1	2025
Dromana		Tigers	Dromana Recreation Reserve, Dromana	NFL	1896	1987–	5	2026
Edithvale-Aspendale		Eagles	Regents Park, Aspendale	MPFL	1921	1987–	7	2024
Frankston (Women's teams only)		Dolphins	Kinetic Stadium, Frankston	SEWF	1887	2024–	1	2024
Frankston Bombers		Bombers	Baxter Park, Frankston South	MPFL	1885	1987–	2	2009
Frankston YCW		Stonecats	Jubilee Park, Frankston	NFL	1967	1987–	14	2022
Hastings		Blues	Hastings Park, Hastings	MPFL	1889	1987–	3	2016
Hastings/Balnarring (Red Hill-Balnarring 2024)		Thunder	Balnarring Reserve, Balnarring	–	2024	2024–	2	2025
Karingal		Bulls	Ballam Park, Frankston	NFL	1963	1987–	2	1999
Langwarrin		Kangaroos	Lloyd Park, Langwarrin	NFL	1920	1987–	4	2022
Mornington		Bulldogs	Alexandra Park, Mornington	MPFL	1888	1987–	5	2023
Mount Eliza		Redlegs	Emil Madsen Reserve, Mount Eliza	MPFL	1964	1987–	4	2024
Pearcedale		Panthers	Pearcedale Recreation Reserve, Pearcedale	NFL	1898	1987–	3	2003
Pines		Pythons	Eric Bell Reserve, Frankston North	MPFL	1964	1987–	3	2018
Red Hill		Hillmen	Red Hill Recreation Reserve, Red Hill	NFL	1929	1987–	3	2026
Rosebud		Buds	Olympic Park, Rosebud	NFL	1929	1987–	5	2025
Rye		Demons	RJ Rowley Reserve, Rye	MPFL	1945	1987–	1	2006
Seaford		Tigers	RF Miles Recreation Reserve, Seaford	MPFL	1921	1987–	3	2009
Somerville		Eagles	Somerville Recreation Reserve, Somerville	NFL	1892	1987–	0	–
Sorrento		Sharks	David Macfarlane Reserve, Sorrento	MPFL	1908	1987–	7	2017
Tyabb		Yabbies	Bunguyan Reserve, Tyabb	NFL	1899	1987–	1	2000
Warragul Industrials		Dusties	Western Park, Warragul	SEWF	1948	2024–	2	2024

=== Murray ===
Club	Colours	Nickname	Home Ground	Former League	Est.	MFNL Seasons	MFNL Senior Premierships	
Club	Colours	Nickname	Home Ground	Former League	Est.	MFNL Seasons	Total	Most recent
Cobram		Tigers	Scott Reserve, Cobram	GVFA	1887	1937–	13	2025
Congupna		The Road, Roaders	Congupna Recreation Reserve, Congupna	TFL, GVFL	1956	1997–	2	2026
Echuca United		Eagles	Echuca South Recreation Reserve, Echuca	NEFL	1994	1997–	1	2013
Nathalia		Purples	Nathalia Recreation Reserve, Nathalia	PDFNL, TDFL	1887	1933–	14	2019
Numurkah		Blues	Numurkah Showgrounds, Numurkah	GVFA	1882	1931–	13	2000
Rumbalara		Rumba	Rumbalara Recreation Reserve, Shepparton	CGFL	1997	2006–	1	2014
Tongala		Blues	Tongala Recreation Reserve, Tongala	GVFL	1894	2006–	0	_

=== Murray Valley ===
Club	Colours	Nickname	Home Ground	Former League	Est.	MFNL Seasons	MFNL Senior Premierships	
Club	Colours	Nickname	Home Ground	Former League	Est.	MFNL Seasons	Total	Most recent
Murrayville		Blues	Murrayville Recreation Reserve, Murrayville	MFL	1960	2023–	2	2025

=== North Central ===
Club	Colours	Nickname	Home Ground	Former League	Est.	NCFL Seasons	NCFL Senior Premierships	
Club	Colours	Nickname	Home Ground	Former League	Est.	NCFL Seasons	Total	Most recent
Birchip-Watchem		Bulls	Birchip Recreation Reserve, Birchip	–	1997	1997–	2	2022
Boort		Magpies	Boort Park, Boort	GRFL	1889	1951–	3	2008
Calder United		Lions	Nullawil Recreation Reserve, Nullawil and Wycheproof Recreation Reserve, Wycheproof	–	2024	2025–	0	–
Charlton		Navy Blues	Charlton Park, Charlton	KFL	1880	1940–	13	2016
Donald		Royal Blues	Donald Recreation Reserve, Donald	DDFA	1880s	1930, 1932–	13	2006
Sea Lake-Nandaly Tigers		Tigers	Sea Lake Recreation Reserve, Sea Lake	MFL	2003	2016–	3	2024
St Arnaud		Saints	Lord Nelson Park, St Arnaud	DDFA	1877	1930, 1932–	11	2015
Wedderburn		Redbacks	Donaldson Park, Wedderburn	KFL	1882	1950–	9	2026

=== North East Border Female Football ===
Club	Colors	Nickname	Home Ground	Former League	Est.	NEBFFL Seasons	NEBFFL Senior Premierships	
Club	Colors	Nickname	Home Ground	Former League	Est.	NEBFFL Seasons	Total	Most recent
Wangaratta Rovers		Hawks	W.J. Findlay Oval, Wangaratta	–	1922	2018–	0	–
Wodonga Raiders		Raiders	Birallee Park, Wodonga	–	1975	2015–	0	–

=== North Gippsland ===
Club	Colours	Nickname	Home Ground	Former League	Est.	NGFNL Seasons	NGFNL Senior Premierships	
Club	Colours	Nickname	Home Ground	Former League	Est.	NGFNL Seasons	Total	Most recent
Churchill		Cougars	Gaskin Park, Churchill	GL	1888	1995–	5	2019
Cowwarr		Saints	Cowwarr Recreation Reserve, Cowwarr	CFL	1892	1955–	6	2026
Glengarry		Magpies	Glengarry Recreation Reserve, Glengarry	CFL	1895	1955–	11	2013
Gormandale		Tigers	Gormandale Recreation Reserve, Gormandale	CFL	1898	1955–	6	1995
Heyfield		Kangaroos	Gordon Street Reserve, Heyfield	GL	1882	1975–	10	2012
Rosedale		Blues	Rosedale Recreation Reserve, Rosedale	CFL	1882	1955–	6	2015
Sale City		Bulldogs	Stephenson Park, Sale	–	1970	1970–2002, 2004–	7	2017
Traralgon Tyers United		Bombers	Tyers Recreation Reserve, Tyers	GL	1981	1981, 1989–	3	2023
Woodside & District		Wildcats	Woodside Recreation Reserve, Woodside	–	2008	2008–	2	2025
Yallourn Yallourn North		Jets	George Bates Reserve, Yallourn North	MGFNL	1977	2021–	1	2022
Yarram		Demons	Yarram Recreation Reserve, Yarram	AFNL	1887	2014–	1	2018

=== Omeo & District ===
Club	Colours	Nickname	Home Ground	Former League	Est.	ODFNL Seasons	ODFNL Senior Premierships	
Club	Colours	Nickname	Home Ground	Former League	Est.	ODFNL Seasons	Total	Most recent
Bruthen		Bulldogs	Bruthen Rec. Reserve, Bruthen	EGFL	1920	1978–	10	2026
Buchan		Cavemen	Buchan Rec. Reserve, Buchan	GFL	1920s	1978–	5	2005
Lindenow South		Swampies (Swamp Hawks)	Lindenow South Rec. Reserve, Lindenow South	RFL	1902	2004–	5	2022
Omeo–Benambra		Ranges (Alpine Ranges)	Omeo Recreation Reserve, Omeo	–	2007	2007–	3	2025
Swifts Creek		Demons	Swifts Creek Rec. Reserve, Swifts Creek	TVFA	1890s	1893–	29	2023

=== Outer East ===
Club	Colours	Nickname	Home Ground	Former League	Est.	OEFNL Seasons	OEFNL Senior Premierships	
Club	Colours	Nickname	Home Ground	Former League	Est.	OEFNL Seasons	Total	Most recent
Alexandra		Rebels	Alexandra Showgrounds, Alexandra	YRFNL	1872	2019–	0	–
Belgrave		Magpies	Belgrave Recreation Reserve, Belgrave	YRFNL	1907	2019–	0	–
Emerald		Bombers	Chandler Recreation Reserve, Emerald	YRFNL	1904	2019–	1	2023
Gembrook Cockatoo		Brookers	Gembrook Recreation Reserve, Gembrook	YRFNL	1906	2019–	1	2022
Healesville		Bloods	Don Road Sporting Complex, Healesville	YRFNL	1888	2019–	1	2024
Monbulk		Hawks	Monbulk Recreation Reserve, Monbulk	YRFNL	1895	2019–	0	–
Mount Evelyn		Rovers	Mount Evelyn Recreation Reserve, Mount Evelyn	YRFNL	1931	2019–	0	–
Officer		Kangaroos	Officer Recreation Reserve, Officer	SEFNL	1977	2019–	0	–
Olinda-Ferny Creek		Bloods	Olinda Recreation Reserve, Olinda	YRFNL	1908	2019–	0	–
Pakenham		Lions	Toomuc Reserve, Pakenham	SEFNL	1892	2019–	1	2026
Powelltown		Demons	Powelltown Recreation Reserve, Powelltown	YRFNL	1922	2019–	2	2023
Seville		Blues	Seville Recreation Reserve, Seville	YRFNL	1972	2019–	1	2019
Thornton-Eildon		Shinboners	Thornton Recreation Reserve, Thornton	–	1957	2019–	0	–
Upwey-Tecoma		Tigers	Upwey Recreation Reserve, Upwey	YRFNL	1946	2019–	0	–
Wandin		Bulldogs	Wandin North Recreation Reserve, Wandin North	YRFNL	1909	2019–	3	2026
Warburton-Millgrove		Burras	Mac Sparke Oval, Warburton	YRFNL	1967	2019–	1	2025
Woori Yallock		Tigers	Woori Yallock Recreation Reserve, Woori Yallock	YRFNL	1904	2019–	0	–
Warburton-Wesburn		Burras	Mac Sparke Oval, Warburton	–	1967	2019–	1	2025
Yarra Glen		River Pigs	Yarra Glen Recreation Reserve, Yarra Glen	YRFNL	1888	2019–	0	–
Yarra Junction		Eagles	Yarra Junction Memorial Reserve, Yarra Junction	YRFNL	1909	2019–	0	–
Yea		Tigers	Yea Showgrounds, Yea	YRFNL	1893	2018–2021, 2024	0	–

=== Ovens & King ===
Club	Colours	Nickname	Home Ground	Former League	Est.	Years in OKFNL	OKFNL Senior Premierships	
Club	Colours	Nickname	Home Ground	Former League	Est.	Years in OKFNL	Total	Most recent
Benalla All Blacks		Panthers	Friendlies Oval, Benalla	BDFNL	1934	2005–	1	2022
Bonnie Doon		Bombers	Bonnie Doon Recreation Reserve, Bonnie Doon	BDFNL	1885	2010–	1	2023
Bright		Mountain Men	Pioneer Park, Bright	MBFL	1913	1955–	5	2025
Goorambat		Bats	Goorambat Recreation Reserve, Goorambat	BDFNL	1893	2010–	0	–
Greta		Blues	Greta Recreation Reserve, Hansonville	KVFA	1901	1945–	10	2024
King Valley United		Kangaroos	Whitfield Recreation Reserve, Whitfield	–	1935	1935–	2	1981
Milawa		Demons	Milawa Recreation Reserve, Milawa	WDFA	1903	1903–1921, 1925–	11	2019
Moyhu		Hoppers	Moyhu Recreation Reserve, Moyhu	WDFA	1891	1903–1922, 1925–	18	2011
North Wangaratta		Hawks	North Wangaratta Sports Reserve, North Wangaratta	WDFA, BDFNL	1892	1914–1915, 1919–1920, 1929–1933, 1961–	4	2012
Tarrawingee		Bulldogs	Tarrawingee Recreation Reserve, Tarrawingee	WDFA	1903	1903–1921, 1925–	8	2018
Whorouly		Lions	Whorouly Recreation Reserve, Whorouly	–	1892	1904–	8	2026

=== Ovens & Murray ===
Club	Colours	Nickname	Home Ground	Former League	Est.	OMFNL Seasons	OMFNL Senior Premierships	
Club	Colours	Nickname	Home Ground	Former League	Est.	OMFNL Seasons	Total	Most recent
Myrtleford		Saints	McNamara Reserve, Myrtleford	O&KFL	1896	1950–	1	1970
Wangaratta		Magpies	Norm Minns Oval, Wangaratta	O&KFL	1877	1893–1897, 1899–1903, 1922–1930, 1933–	15	2017
Wangaratta Rovers		Hawks	W.J. Findlay Oval, Wangaratta	O&KFL	1922	1950–	17	2026
Wodonga		Bulldogs	Martin Park, Wodonga	CDFL	1878	1936–	7	2004
Wodonga Raiders		Raiders	Birallee Park, West Wodonga	TDFL	1953 (Note: As Kergunyah FC)	1989–	1	1998
Yarrawonga		Pigeons	J.C. Lowe Oval, Yarrawonga	BMFL	1889	1929–	6	2023

=== Picola & District ===
Club	Colours	Nickname	Home Ground	Former League	Est.	PDFNL Seasons	PDFNL Senior Premierships	
Club	Colours	Nickname	Home Ground	Former League	Est.	PDFNL Seasons	Total	Most recent
Dookie United		Dooks	Dookie Recreation Reserve, Dookie	CGFL, KDFNL	1977	2006–2017, 2025–	1	2007
Katamatite		Tigers	Katamatite Recreation Reserve, Katamatite	TFL	1891	1950–1955, 1995–	5	2026
Katandra		Kats	Katandra Recreation Reserve, Katandra West	MFNL	1911	1996–2017, 2020–	3	2004
Katunga		Swans	Katunga Recreation Reserve, Katunga	–	1950	1950–	4	1984
Picola United		Blues	Picola Recreation Reserve, Picola	–	1971	1905–07, 1934–	12	2017
Strathmerton		Bulldogs	Strathmerton Recreation Reserve, Strathmerton	MFNL	1894	1936–1937, 1994–	6	2019
Tungamah		Bears	Tungamah Recreation Reserve, Tungamah	MFNL	1882	1995–2017, 2020–	6	2015
Waaia		Bombers	Waaia Recreation Reserve, Waaia	GVFA	1894	1932–	13	2024

=== Riddell District ===
Club	Colours	Nickname	Home Ground	Former League	Est.	RDFNL Seasons	RDFNL Senior Premierships	
Club	Colours	Nickname	Home Ground	Former League	Est.	RDFNL Seasons	Total	Most recent
Bacchus Marsh (Thirds team only)		Cobras	Maddingley Park, Maddingley	–	1979	2017–	0	–
Darley (Thirds team only)		Devils	Darley Park, Darley	–	1919	2025–	0	–
Diggers Rest		Burras	Diggers Rest Recreation Reserve, Diggers Rest	–	1978	1978–	5	2026
Eynesbury		Eagles	Eynesbury Recreation Reserve, Eynesbury	WFNL	2014	2016–2023, 2025–	0	–
Gisborne Giants		Giants	Gardiner Reserve, Gisborne	–	2016	2025–	0	–
Kyneton		Tigers	Kyneton Showgrounds, Kyneton	BFNL	1868	2024–	0	–
Lancefield		Tigers	Lancefield Park, Lancefield	–	1872	1920–	11	2009
Macedon		Cats	Tony Clarke Reserve, Macedon	GDFA, TFA	1887	1920–2000, 2003–	2	2014
Melton (Women's team only)		Bloods	MacPherson Park, Toolern Vale	BFL	1879	2023–	0	–
Melton Central		Blues	Arnolds Creek Recreation Reserve, Melton West	–	1996	1996–	0	–
Melton South		Panthers	Melton Recreation Reserve, Melton	BFNL	1973	1973–1996, 2025–	1	1994
Mt Alexander		Falcons	Harcourt Recreation Reserve, Harcourt	CVFL	2021	2023–	0	–
Riddell		Bombers	Riddells Creek Recreation Reserve, Riddells Creek	GDFA	1888	1912–	16	2025
Romsey		Redbacks	Romsey Park, Romsey	–	1874	1920–	22	2015
Wallan		Magpies	Greenhill Reserve, Wallan	NFNL	1891	1947–53, 1965–2001, 2008–	5	2021
Woodend-Hesket		Hawks	Gilbert Gordon Reserve, Woodend	–	1978	1978–	4	2007

=== South West District ===
Club	Colours	Nickname	Home Ground	Former League	Est.	SWDFNL Seasons	SWDFNL Senior Premierships	
Club	Colours	Nickname	Home Ground	Former League	Est.	SWDFNL Seasons	Total	Most recent
Branxholme-Wallacedale		Saints	Branxholme Recreation Reserve, Branxholme	–	1983	1983–	1	1983
Cavendish		Bloods	Cavendish Recreation Reserve, Cavendish	GFL	1900s	1970–	6	2025
Coleraine		Maroons	Coleraine Recreation Reserve, Coleraine	WBFL	1900s	1995–	8	2023
Dartmoor		Giants	Dartmoor Recreation Reserve, Dartmoor	PDFL	1920s	1970–	7	2026
Heathmere		Magpies	Heathmere Recreation Reserve, Heathmere	PDFL	1920s	1970–	3	2002
Heywood		Lions	Heywood Recreation Reserve, Heywood	WBFL	1920s	2012–	4	2019
Tyrendarra		Darras	Tyrendarra Recreation Reserve, Tyrendarra	PDFL	1900s	1970–	10	2024
Westerns		Roos	Alexandra Park, Portland	PDFL	1949	1970–	8	2000

=== Sunraysia ===
Club	Colours	Nickname	Home Ground	Former League	Est.	SFNL Seasons	SFNL Senior Premierships	
Club	Colours	Nickname	Home Ground	Former League	Est.	SFNL Seasons	Total	Most recent
Imperials		Imps	Brian Weightman Oval, Mildura	MDFL	1929	1945–	20	2024
Irymple		Swallows	Henshilwood Oval, Irymple	MDFL	1903	1945–	9	2023
Merbein		Magpies	Kenny Park, Merbein	MDFL	1910	1945–	6	2003
Mildura		Demons	Brian Weightman Oval, Mildura	MDFL	1888	1945–	10	2026
Ouyen United		Kangas	Blackburn Park, Ouyen and Underbool Recreation Reserve, Underbool	–	2015	2016–	2	2018
Red Cliffs		Tigers	Quandong Park, Red Cliffs	MDFL	1919	1945–	11	2015
Robinvale-Euston		Eagles	John James Oval, Robinvale	–	2015	2016–	0	–
South Mildura		Bulldogs	Mildura Sporting Precinct, Mildura	–	1945	1945–	4	1998

=== Tallangatta & District ===
Club	Colours	Nickname	Home Ground	Former League	Est.	TDFL Seasons	TDFL Senior Premierships	
Club	Colours	Nickname	Home Ground	Former League	Est.	TDFL Seasons	Total	Most recent
Barnawartha		Tigers	Barnawartha Recreation Reserve, Barnawartha	CDFL	1911	1958–	3	2026
Beechworth		Bushrangers	Baarmutha Park, Beechworth	O&KFL	1861	2004–	1	2010
Chiltern		Swans	Chiltern Recreation and Sports Reserve, Chiltern	O&KFL	1860s	2003–	2	2023
Dederang-Mt. Beauty		Bombers	Dederang Recreation Reserve, Dederang and Mount Beauty Recreation Reserve, Mount Beauty	–	1976	1976–	3	2003
Kiewa-Sandy Creek		Hawks	Coulston Park, Tangambalanga	–	1969	1969–	14	2025
Mitta United		Mountain Men	Eskdale Recreation Reserve, Eskdale and Magorra Park, Mitta Mitta	–	1945	1945; 1952–	22	2012
Rutherglen		Cats	Barkly Park, Rutherglen	O&KFL	1978	2004–	0	–
Tallangatta (Note: known as the Tallangatta Valley Football Club from their establishment in 1978; renamed in 2008.)		Hoppers	Rowen Park, Tallangatta	–	1978	1978–	8	2015
Wahgunyah		Lions	Wahgunyah Recreation Reserve, Wahgunyah	CDFNL	1908	2008–	0	–
Wodonga Saints (Note: known as the Bethanga Football Club from their establishment in 1907; name changed upon relocation in 2001.)		Saints	Martin Park, Wodonga and Bethanga Recreation Reserve, Bethanga	–	1907	1945–1947; 1949–1950; 1952–1955; 1957; 1976–	0	–
Yackandandah (Note: Club only competed in TDFL Reserves Grades from the 1969 season until the 1971 season.)		Roos	Butson Park, Yackandandah	CDFL	1884	1957–1968; 1972–	3	2024

=== Upper Murray ===
Club	Colours	Nickname	Home Ground	Former League	Est.	UMFNL Seasons	UMFNL Senior Premierships	
Club	Colours	Nickname	Home Ground	Former League	Est.	UMFNL Seasons	Total	Most recent
Bullioh		Bulldogs	Wyeeboo/Bullioh Recreation Reserve, Tallangatta Valley	–	1947	2001–	10	2026
Corryong		Demons	Corryong Recreation Reserve, Corryong	–	1892	1893–1915; 1918–1940; 1945–	32	2017
Cudgewa		Blues	Cudgewa Football Ground, Cudgewa	–	1892	1893–1915; 1918–1940; 1945–	31	2023

=== Warrnambool & District ===
Club	Colours	Nickname	Home Ground	Former League	Est.	WDFNL Seasons	WDFNL Senior Premierships	
Club	Colours	Nickname	Home Ground	Former League	Est.	WDFNL Seasons	Total	Most recent
Allansford (West End-Allansford 1971–2001)		Cats	Allansford Recreation Reserve, Allansford	–	1971	1971–	7	1987
Dennington		Dogs	Dennington Recreation Reserve, Dennington	WCFA	1900s	1953–	4	2015
Kolora Noorat		Power	Noorat Recreation Reserve, Noorat	–	2003	2003–	5	2019
Merrivale		Tigers	Merrivale Recreation Reserve, Warrnambool	WCFA	1931	1946–	7	2014
Nirranda		Blues	Nirranda Recreation Reserve, Nirranda	HFL	1900s	1992–	8	2026
Old Collegians (YCW 1951–52)		Warriors	Davidson Oval, Warrnambool	–	1951	1951–	8	1992
Panmure		Bulldogs	Panmure Recreation Reserve, Panmure	HMFNL	1919	1997–	5	2013
Russells Creek		Kangaroos	Mack Oval, Warrnambool	–	1931	1946–	9	2000
South Rovers		Lions	Walter Oval, Warrnambool	WDJFA	1919	1946–	5	2007
Timboon		Demons	Timboon Recreation Reserve, Timboon	–	2002	2003–	1	2008

=== West Gippsland ===
Club	Colours	Nickname	Home Ground	Former League	Est.	WGFNC Seasons	WGFNC Senior Premierships	
Club	Colours	Nickname	Home Ground	Former League	Est.	WGFNC Seasons	Total	Most recent
Cora Lynn		Cobras	Cora Lynn Recreation Reserve, Cora Lynn	EDFL	1913	2017–	0	—
Dalyston		Magpies	Dalyston Recreation Reserve, Dalyston	AFNL	1898	2017–	0	—
Garfield		Stars	Garfield Recreation Reserve, Garfield	EDFL	1935	2017–	0	—
Inverloch Kongwak		Sea Eagles	Inverloch Recreation Reserve, Inverloch	AFNL	1957	2017–	2	2023
Kilcunda Bass		Panthers	Bass Recreation Reserve, Bass	AFNL	1957	2017–	0	—
Koo Wee Rup		Demons	Koo Wee Rup Recreation Reserve, Koo Wee Rup	EDFL	1900	2017–	0	—
Korumburra Bena		Giants	Korumburra Showgrounds, Korumburra	AFNL	2001	2017–	0	—
Nar Nar Goon		Goons	Nar Nar Goon Recreation Reserve, Nar Nar Goon	EDFL	1900	2017–	3	2026
Phillip Island		Bulldogs	Cowes Recreation Reserve, Cowes	AFNL	1932	2017–	2	2019
Tooradin Dalmore		Seagulls	Tooradin Recreation Reserve, Tooradin	SEFNL	1922	2019–	1	2022
Warragul Industrials		Dusties	Western Park Reserve, Warragul	EDFL	1948	2019–	0	—

=== Western Victoria Female ===
Club	Colours	Nickname	Home Ground(s)	Former League	Est.	WVFFL Seasons	WVFFL Senior Premierships	
Club	Colours	Nickname	Home Ground(s)	Former League	Est.	WVFFL Seasons	Total	Most recent
Branxholme-Wallacedale		Saints	Branxholme Recreation Reserve, Branxholme	–	1982	2026–	0	–
Cavendish		Bloods	Cavendish Recreation Reserve, Cavendish	–	1900s	2024–	0	–
Hamilton Kangaroos		Kangaroos	Melville Oval, Hamilton	–	2012	2017–	3	2025
Terang Mortlake		Bloods	Terang Recreation Reserve, Terang and D.C. Farran Oval, Mortlake	–	2001	2026–	0	–
Tyrendarra		Darras	Tyrendarra Recreation Reserve, Tyrendarra	–	1900s	2022–	0	–
Warrnambool		Blues	Reid Oval, Warrnambool	–	1861	2017–	0	–
South Warrnambool		Roosters	Friendly Societies Park, Warrnambool	–	1902	2017–	1	2026

=== Wimmera ===
Club	Colours	Nickname	Home Ground(s)	Former League	Est.	WFNL Seasons	WFNL Senior Premierships	
Club	Colours	Nickname	Home Ground(s)	Former League	Est.	WFNL Seasons	Total	Most recent
Ararat		Rats	Alexandra Oval, Ararat	BFL	1871	1937–	14	2025
Dimboola		Roos	Dimboola Recreation Reserve, Dimboola	MWFL	1880s	1937–	5	2013
Horsham		Demons	Horsham City Oval, Horsham	BFL	1892	1937–	26	2018
Horsham Saints (St Michaels 1993–99)		Saints	Coughlin Park, Horsham	HDFNL	1945	1993–	2	2016
Minyip-Murtoa		Burras	Minyip Recreation Reserve, Minyip and Murtoa Recreation Reserve, Murtoa	–	1994	1995–	5	2022
Nhill		Tigers	Davis Park, Nhill	MWFL	1880s	1937–	5	2026
Southern Mallee		Thunder	Beulah Memorial Park, Beulah; Hopetoun Recreation Reserve, Hopetoun; Sir Robert Menzies Park; Jeparit, Rainbow Recreation Reserve, Rainbow	–	2023	2024–	0	–
Stawell		Warriors	Central Reserve, Stawell	BFL	1874	1937–	8	2000
Warrack Eagles		Eagles	Anzac Park, Warracknabeal and Brim Recreation Reserve, Brim	–	2000	2001–	1	2002
