= Simpson Football Netball Club =

Simpson

Names
- Full name: Simpson Football Netball Club
- Nickname(s): Tigers

Club details
- Founded: 1965; 60 years ago
- Colours: black gold
- Competition: Colac DFNL
- President: Brad Smith
- Premierships: 2 (2014, 2015)
- Ground(s): Ag Warehouse Oval

Uniforms
Home

The Simpson Football Netball Club is an Australian rules football club which competes in the Colac & District Football Netball League since 2003 after the former league they competed in folded at the end of 2002. The club is based in the Victorian town of Simpson. Simpson is approximately 35 km southwest of Colac, the administrative centre of the league and main regional centre for the region.

== History ==
The Simpson Football Club was founded in 1965 and have competed in several different league's including the Purnim and District Football League (until 1969), Purnim Heytesbury Football League (until 1979), Heytesbury Football League (until 1991) and finally the Heytesbury Mount Noorat Football League (1992 - 2002).

They currently compete in the Colac DFNL where they have stayed since 2003. They have not had much success by only winning two premierships in 2014 and 2015. However, they have won 12 premierships all up in other leagues since their founding in 1965.

Simpson's A Grade netball team broke through for their maiden Colac DFNL premiership in 2018.

== Premierships ==
- 1970 - Simpson 11.10.76 defeated Timboon 9.9.63
- 1975 - Simpson 8.13.61 defeated Port Campbell 9.4.58
- 1976 - Simpson 14.11.95 defeated Port Campbell 13.14.92
- 1979
- 1981
- 1982
- 1987
- 1991
- 1992
- 1993
- 2014
- 2015

== Bibliography ==
- Cat Country - History of Football In The Geelong Region - John Stoward - ISBN 978-0-9577515-8-3
- Football Country Style : a history of football in the Colac District from 1900 - 1974 - Bill Doran
