= Irrewarra-Beeac Football Netball Club =

Irrewarra-Beeac

Names
- Full name: Irrewarra-Beeac Football Netball Club
- Nickname: Bombers

Club details
- Founded: 1983; 42 years ago
- Colours: black red
- Competition: Colac DFNL
- Premierships: 3 (2008, 2009, 2010)
- Ground: Irrewarra Recreation Reserve

Uniforms
Home

The Irrewarra-Beeac Football Netball Club is an Australian rules football club which competes in the Colac & District Football League (Colac DFL) since 1986. They are based in the Victorian town of Irrewarra. Irrewarra is about six miles east of Colac.

== History ==
The Irrewarra-Beeac Football Club has competed in the Colac DFL since 1986. They are the result of a merger between the Irrewarra Football club and the Beeac Football clubs in 1986. Both clubs were members of the Colac DFL until rural decline forced the clubs to merge because of lack of players.

In 1985 Beeac found itself in a position where it didn't have enough players to fill the teams so it went into recess. Irrewarra managed to compete in the 1985 season with the help of players from Beeac. At the end of the year they formally made an announcement of a merger. They choose the Irrewarra oval for their home ground. This oval was often used by the league for finals matches. The Beeac home ground was subject to flooding after heavy rain and many games had to be rescheduled because of it.

=== Former clubs ===
Colors	Club	Nickname	Founded	Years in CDFL	Premiers won	Premiership Years
	Beeac	Magpies	1883	1945–1949, 1962–84	12	1910, 1913, 1923, 1927, 1928, 1929, 1930, 1937, 1938, 1950, 1956
	Irrewarra	Bombers	1922	1947–85	3	1948, 1956, 1972

The Irrewarra club had played all of its football in competitions in and around Colac. They started in the CDFL B grade competition in 1947. They won the 1948 B grade flag. In 1950 there was a mass exodus of clubs from the CDFL, the cause was that the Colac (Hampden league) team wanted to have the right to pick any player from the Colac DFL without needing a clearance. The result was the larger clubs opted to leave and join the Polwarth FL and be away from Colac's reach. With only Alvie and Warrion remaining in A Grade the surviving B Grade clubs combined into a single local competition.

The Beeac club because of its location often had to choose whether to play in a league to the North of the town or play in one in the South. Beeac had two stints in the Western Plains FL 1935-1940 and again from 1950 to 1951. Straight after World War II Beeac was in the CDFL from 1945 to 1949, they followed the other clubs out of the competition and way from Colac's reach. There no doubt that the Colac DFL was a stronger competition than the Western Plains League, after two Grand Finals and 1 flag Beeac opted to spend 12 seasons in the Polwarth FL. It won the Flag in 1956 and returned to the CDFL in 1962 when the Polwarth FL start admitting teams from the Bellarine Peninsula.

== VFL/AFL players ==
- David Cameron - Geelong - Brisbane Bears
- Peter Walker - Geelong
- Lindsay Froggy Harrison-Randle

== Bibliography ==
- Cat Country - History of Football In The Geelong Region - John Stoward - ISBN 978-0-9577515-8-3
- Football Country Style : a history of football in the Colac District from 1900-1974 - Bill Doran
