= Alvie Football Netball Club =

Australian rules football club

Alvie

Names
- Full name: Alvie Football Netball Club
- Nickname: Swans

Club details
- Founded: 1922; 104 years ago
- Colours: red white
- Competition: Colac DFNL
- Premierships: 13 (1950, 1954, 1959, 1962, 1965, 1966, 1967, 1969, 1970, 1975, 1977, 2000, 2023, 2025.
- Ground: Alvie Recreation Reserve

Uniforms
Home

The Alvie Football Netball Club is an Australian rules football club which competes in the Colac DFL since its founding in 1937. They are based in the Victorian town of Alvie. Alvie is approximately 12 km northwest of Colac, the main regional centre for the region. The current club champion and captain is Charlie Johns

== History ==
The Alvie Football Club was founded in 1922 and first competed in the Colac Junior Association. There was a lot of reorganization during the 1920s with competitions starting a foundering every couple of years.

They have competed in the Colac DFL since 1937. They are the only original club still in the competition. They first made the Grand final in 1945 which they lost. Since then they have been the most successful club in the competition with 12 premierships.

Prior to the 2019 CDFNL season Alvie appointed former Carlton Listed & Alvie junior Joseph Dare to coach the clubs football department. Alvie finished 5th and were eliminated from there first finals outing by Apollo bay hawks. the season was seen as a success by fans as the club will look forward to Joe taking charge in season 2020 with recruiting already under way to fill the gaps of a promising outfit. 2019 Best 7 Fairest Seniors: Charlie Johns Netball: Chelsea Hillman

== Football Premierships ==
- 1950, 1954, 1959, 1962, 1965, 1966, 1967, 1969, 1970, 1975, 1977, 2000, 2023

== Netball Premierships ==
- 1985, 1986, 1987, 1989, 1990, 1991, 1992, 1993, 2006, 2019, 2022.

== Bibliography ==
- Cat Country - History of Football in the Geelong Region - John Stoward - ISBN 978-0-9577515-8-3
- Football Country Style : a history of football in the Colac District from 1900 - 1974 - Bill Doran
