= Colac & District Football Netball League =

Minor country football league in Australia

- Formerly: Colac & District Football League (1937–2024)
- Sport: Australian rules football Netball
- Founded: 1937; 89 years ago
- First season: 1937
- No. of teams: 10
- Country: Australia
- Headquarters: Highton, Victoria, Australia
- Confederation: AFL Barwon
- Most recent champion: Lorne (15th Premiership) (2026)
- Most titles: Lorne (15 Premierships)
- Sponsor: Colac RSL
- Website: cdfnl.com.au

The Colac & District Football Netball League (CDFNL) is a minor country football league based in the South West of Victoria in the city of Colac. The CDFNL has 10 clubs, all located in the Colac Otway Shire, with the exception of Lorne, which falls within the Surf Coast Shire. The competition incorporates the two sports of Australian rules football and netball.

== History ==
The Colac & District Football League was formed in 1937, as a result of a merger of the Colac and District FA (known pre-1936 as the Colac Churches FA) and the Corangamite Farmers FA. It had A Grade and B Grade competitions.

In 1950 there was a mass exodus of clubs from the CDFL, the cause was that the Colac (Hampden league) team wanted to have the right to pick any player from the Colac DFL without needing a clearance. The result was Colac Imperials and Coragulac opted to leave and join the Polwarth FL and be away from Colac's reach. Beeac went to the Western Plains FL for two years before also joining the Polwarth FL, and Colac Rovers folded. With only Alvie and Warrion remaining in A Grade the surviving B Grade clubs combined into a single local competition along with Carlisle River from the Otway FA.

Over the years, a number of clubs moved between the CDFL and other local leagues, including the Otway Football Association, Polwarth Football League, and the Heytesbury Mt Noorat Football League, all of which are now defunct.

The Polwarth Football League folded after the 1970 season, with Lorne and Apollo Bay joining the CDFL and the other clubs moving to the Bellarine FL.

Otway Districts and Simpson joined the CDFL in 2003, after the Heytesbury Mt Noorat FL folded.

In early 2016, it was announced that Forrest would fold due to lack of players.

== Clubs ==
=== Current ===
Club	Colours	Moniker	Home venue	Former League	Est.	Years in CDFNL	CDFNL premierships	
Club	Colours	Moniker	Home venue	Former League	Est.	Years in CDFNL	Total	Most recent
Alvie		Swans	Alvie Recreation Reserve, Alvie	CCFA	1922	1937-	14	2025
Apollo Bay		Hawks	Apollo Bay Recreation Reserve, Apollo Bay	PFL	c. 1900s	1971-	6	2004
Birregurra		Saints	Birregurra Recreation Reserve, Birregurra	PFL	1883	1967-	6	2017
Colac Imperials (St Andrews 1937)		Imperials	Western Reserve, Colac	CCFA, PFL	1922	1937-1949, 1955-	12	1995
Irrewarra-Beeac		Bombers	Irrewarra Recreation Reserve, Irrewarra	—	1982	1983-	3	2010
Lorne		Dolphins	Stribling Reserve, Lorne	PFL	1896	1971-	15	2026
Otway Districts		Demons	Gellibrand Recreation Reserve, Gellibrand	HMNFL	1981	1982-1993, 2003-	0	—
Simpson		Tigers	Simpson Recreation Reserve, Simpson	HMNFL	1965	2003-	2	2015
South Colac		Kangaroos	Joiner Reserve, Elliminyt	—	1951	1951-	6	2022
Western Eagles		Eagles	Irrewillipe Recreation Reserve, Irrewillipe	—	1996	1996-	0	—

=== Former clubs ===
Club	Colours	Moniker	Home venue	Former league	Est.	Years in CDFNL	CDFNL premierships		Fate
Club	Colours	Moniker	Home venue	Former league	Est.	Years in CDFNL	Total	Most recent	Fate
Balintore				CFFA	c. 1920s	1945	0	—	Folded
Beeac		Magpies	Beeac Recreation Reserve, Beeac	WPFL	1883	1945-1949, 1962-1984	0	—	Returned to Western Plains FL after 1949 season. Merged with Irrewarra in 1985 to form Irrewarra-Beeac
Carlisle River		Blues	Carlisle River Recreation Reserve, Carlisle River	OFA	1912	1950-1973	0	—	Absorbed by Otway Rovers in 1974
Colac Diggers		Diggers	Colac Showgrounds, Colac	PFL	c. 1920s	1947-1948	0	—	Merged with Colac Rovers to form Colac in 1948
Colac Rovers		Rovers	Colac Showgrounds, Colac	CFL	c. 1900s	1947-1948	1	1939	Merged with Colac Diggers to form Colac in 1948
Coragulac Rovers		Rovers	Coragulac Recreation Reserve, Warrion Hill Rd, Warrion	—	1937	1937-1949	3	1948	Moved to Polwarth FL in 1950
Corangamite (Corangamite 1938)		Colts		CFL	1889	1938-1939	0	—	Folded in 1940
Elliminyt			Joiner Reserve, Elliminyt	CCFA	c. 1920s	1937-1950	0	—	Folded in 1950
Forrest	(?-1970s)(1970s-?)(?-2016)	Lions	Forrest Recreation Reserve, Forrest	PFL	1891	1970-1985, 1987-2016	2	2012	Recess in 1986. Folded after 2016 season
Gellibrand		Demons	Gellibrand Recreation Reserve, Gellibrand	OFA	1921	1957-1981	0	—	Merged with Otway Rovers to form Otway Districts after 1981 season
Irrewarra		Bombers	Warrowie Recreation Reserve, Irrewarra	CCFA	1922	1947-1985	3	1972	Merged with Beeac in 1985 to form Irrewarra-Beeac
Irrewillipe		Bulldogs	Irrewillipe Recreation Reserve, Irrewillipe	—	c. 1930s	1938-1995	4	1992	Merged with Pirron Yallock in 1996 to form Western Eagles
Nalangil				CFFA	c. 1919	1937-1946	0	—	Merged with Swan Marsh in 1947 to form Nalangil-Swan Marsh
Nalangil-Swan Marsh			Pirron Yallock Recreation Reserve, Swan Marsh	—	1946	1947-1948	0	—	Renamed Pirron Yallock in 1949
North Dreeite				CCFA	1937	1937-1940	0	—	Folded in 1940
Otway Rovers		Rovers	Carlisle River Recreation Reserve, Carlisle River	—	1957	1957-1981	3	1968	Merged with Gellibrand to form Otway Districts after 1981 season
Pirron Yallock (Nalangil-Swan Marsh 1947-48)		Tigers	Pirron Yallock Recreation Reserve, Swan Marsh	CFL	c. 1919	1940, 1949, 1954-1995	0	—	Recess between 1942-48 and 1950-53. Merged with Irrewillipe in 1996 to form Western Eagles
South Purrumbete		Beters	South Purrumbete Recreation Reserve, South Purrumbete	CDFL	1887	1946-1948, 1956-1980	2	1973	Recess from 1949-55. Moved to Heytesbury FL in 1981
St Mary's				CCFA	c. 1920s	1937-1940	0	—	Folded in 1940
Stoneyford				CFFA	c. 1920s	1937-1940	0	—	Folded in 1940
Swan Marsh	White with dark hoops		Pirron Yallock Recreation Reserve, Swan Marsh	CFFA	c. 1920s	1937-1946	1	1937	Merged with Nalangil in 1947 to form Nalangil-Swan Marsh
Warrion		Panthers	Warrion Recreation Reserve, Warrion	CFFA	c. 1920s	1937-1985	2	1952	Folded in 1986
Winchelsea		Blues	Eastern Reserve, Winchelsea	BFL	1876	1983-2001	1	1987	Returned to Geelong & District FNL in 2002
Yeodene				CCFA	c. 1920s	1937	0	—	Folded in 1940

== General statistics ==
General Information
Governing Body	AFL Victoria Country
Founded	1937
Current Clubs	10
Records
Highest Score	376 – Winchelsea 58.28.376 v Forrest 1.4.10 – 1987
Most goals in a game	24 – Wayne Tyquin – Birregurra v Otway Districts – 1993
Most Flags in a row	4 – Lorne (1980–1983)
Most wins in a row	37 – Lorne (2000–2001) Except 2000 grand final
Most losses in a row	55 – Western Eagles (2014–2018)
2024
Premiers	Lorne
Runners Up	Irrewarra-Beeac
Minor Premiers	Alvie
Wooden Spoon	Otway
League Best & Fairest	Brad Surkitt (27) South Colac
Leading Goal Kicker	Dominic Dare (Alvie Swans)

== Senior Football Premierships ==
- 1937 Swan Marsh 3 5 23 defeated Elliminyt 2 3 15
- 1938 Warrion 7 6 48 defeated Nalangil 1 7 13
- 1939 Colac Rovers 7 12 54 defeated Coragulac 3 7 25
- 1940 Coragulac 6 3 39 defeated Pirron Yallock 5 6 36
- 1941 to 1944 no play due to war
- 1945 Colac Imperials 9 10 64 defeated Alvie 7 6 48
- 1946 Coragulac 7 9 51 defeated Beeac 5 11 41
- 1947 Colac Imperials 13 8 86 defeated Coragulac 9 4 58
- 1948 Coragulac 8 9 57 defeated Colac Rovers 7 9 51
- 1949 Colac Imperials 6 8 44 defeated Alvie 3 9 27
- 1950 Alvie 8 5 53 defeated Warrion 3 8 26
- 1951 South Colac 5 7 37 defeated Warrion 3 11 29
- 1952 Warrion 11 13 79 defeated Irrewillipe 7 13 55
- 1953 Irrewillipe 11 9 75 defeated Carlisle River 7 16 58
- 1954 Alvie 16 13 109 defeated South Colac 6 22 58
- 1955 Irrewillipe 7 12 54 defeated Irrewarra 5 6 36
- 1956 Irrewarra 6 8 44 defeated Colac Imperials 4 9 33
- 1957 Otway Rovers 12 10 82 defeated Warrion 5 5 35
- 1958 Otway Rovers 11 7 73 defeated Colac Imperials 9 8 62
- 1959 Alvie 10 18 78 defeated Otway Rovers 10 11 71
- 1960 South Purrumbete 9 12 66 defeated Otway Rovers 6 10 46
- 1961 Otway Rovers 14 13 97 defeated Alvie 10 19 79
- 1962 Alvie 7 9 51 defeated Colac Imperials 4 5 29
- 1963 Colac Imperials 9 13 67 defeated Otway Rovers 8 18 66
- 1964 Colac Imperials 6 4 40 defeated Alvie 4 8 32
- 1965 Alvie 13 16 94 defeated Otway Rovers 10 11 71
- 1966 Alvie 17 7 109 defeated Otway Rovers 10 11 71
- 1967 Alvie 11 6 72 defeated Otway Rovers 10 10 70
- 1968 Otway Rovers 10 13 73 defeated Colac Imperials 10 8 68
- 1969 Alvie 11 17 83 defeated Irrewillipe 4 5 29
- 1970 Alvie 10 9 69 defeated South Colac 8 6 54
- 1971 Irrewillipe 11 7 73 defeated Alvie 9 10 64
- 1972 Irrewarra 13 19 97 defeated Apollo Bay 9 7 61
- 1973 South Purrumbete 6 7 43 Defeated Lorne 6 5 41
- 1974 Lorne 7 6 48 defeated Alvie 6 8 44
- 1975 Alvie 9 12 66 defeated Lorne 6 8 44
- 1976 Lorne 10 18 78 defeated Colac Imperials 6 10 46
- 1977 Alvie 11 6 72 defeated Colac Imperials 10 10 70
- 1978 South Colac 16 9 105 defeated Colac Imperials 15 12 102
- 1979 Colac Imperials 14 18 102 defeated Lorne 14 11 95
- 1980 Lorne 13 13 91 defeated Irrewillipe 8 9 57
- 1981 Lorne 15 12 102 defeated South Colac 12 10 82
- 1982 Lorne 18 10 118 defeated South Colac 11 10 76
- 1983 Lorne 17 9 111 defeated South Colac 10 2 62
- 1984 Apollo Bay 13 12 90 defeated Lorne 9 8 62
- 1985 Birregurra 22 8 140 defeated Alvie 17 8 110
- 1986 Colac Imperials 15 7 97 defeated Winchelsea 6 12 48
- 1987 Winchelsea 19 21 135 defeated Colac Imperials 10 10 70
- 1988 South Colac 15 6 96 defeated Winchelsea 10 7 67
- 1989 Colac Imperials 17 11 113 defeated South Colac 9 13 67
- 1990 Birregurra 14 16 100 defeated South Colac 13 11 89
- 1991 Colac Imperials 13 16 94 defeated Birregurra 12 13 85
- 1992 Irrewillipe 11 9 75 defeated Colac Imperials 8 14 62
- 1993 Apollo Bay 12 11 83 defeated Winchelsea 9 15 69
- 1994 Birregurra 15 5 95 defeated Winchelsea 13 5 83
- 1996 Apollo Bay 11 13 79 defeated Lorne 9 8 62
- 1997 South Colac 16 14 110 defeated Lorne 10 14 74
- 1998 Lorne 11 9 75 defeated Alvie 6 12 48
- 1999 Apollo Bay 19 17 131 defeated Alvie 12 8 80
- 2000 Alvie 13 16 94 defeated Lorne 10 17 77
- 2001 Lorne 18 18 126 defeated South Colac 6 9 45
- 2002 South Colac 14 8 92 defeated Lorne 12 11 83
- 2003 Apollo Bay 5 13 43 defeated Lorne 4 8 32
- 2004 Apollo Bay 23 17 155 defeated Lorne 12 11 83
- 2005 Forrest 3 5 23 defeated Alvie 2 4 16
- 2006 Lorne 21 9 135 defeated Irrewarra-Beeac 10 13 73
- 2007 Lorne 13 12 90 defeated Irrewarra-Beeac 9 8 62
- 2008 Irrewarra-Beeac 14 14 98 defeated Lorne 5 7 37
- 2009 Irrewarra-Beeac 17 18 120 defeated Birregurra 10 8 68
- 2010 Irrewarra-Beeac 11 10 76 defeated Birregurra 11 8 74
- 2011 Birregurra 6 10 46 defeated South Colac 6 7 43
- 2012 Forrest 7 5 47 defeated Lorne 5 12 42
- 2013 Lorne 15 11 101 defeated Colac Imperials 11 6 72
- 2014 Simpson 21 13 139 defeated Birregurra 5 6 36
- 2015 Simpson 12 10 82 defeated Irrewarra-Beeac 8 11 59
- 2016 Birregurra 11 10 76 defeated South Colac 7 12 54
- 2017 Birregurra 15 4 94 defeated Lorne 5 7 37
- 2018 Lorne 8 10 58 defeated Birregurra 5 7 37
- 2019 Lorne 10 18 78 defeated South Colac 2 7 19
- 2020 no play due to COVID pandemic
- 2021 no play due to COVID pandemic
- 2022 South Colac 9 5 59 defeated Irrewarra-Beeac 6 2 38
- 2023 Alvie 8 9 57 defeated Colac Imperials 4 4 28
- 2024 Lorne 7 8 50 defeated Irrewarra-Beeac 4 8 32
- 2025 Alvie 6 10 46 defeated Colac Imperials 5 8 38
- 2026 Lorne 12 8 80 defeated Colac Imperials 9 15 69

=== Grand Final Draws ===
- 1963 Colac Imperials 3 8 26 Drew with Otway Rovers 3 8 26

== A Grade Netball Premierships ==
- 1972 Apollo Bay
- 1973 Apollo Bay
- 1974 Warrion
- 1975 Warrion
- 1976 Warrion
- 1977 Warrion
- 1978 Birregurra
- 1979 Birregurra
- 1980 Beeac
- 1981 Beeac
- 1982 Beeac
- 1983 Birregurra
- 1984 Birregurra
- 1985 Alvie
- 1986 Alvie
- 1987 Alvie
- 1988 Colac Imperials
- 1989 Alvie
- 1990 Alvie
- 1991 Alvie
- 1992 Alvie
- 1993 Alvie
- 1994 Colac Imperials
- 1995 Western Eagles
- 1996 Irrewarra-Beeac
- 1997 Irrewarra-Beeac
- 1998 Colac Imperials
- 1999 Irrewarra-Beeac
- 2000 Colac Imperials
- 2001 Irrewarra-Beeac
- 2002 Irrewarra-Beeac
- 2003 Irrewarra-Beeac
- 2004 Irrewarra-Beeac
- 2005 Irrewarra-Beeac
- 2006 Alvie
- 2007 Irrewarra-Beeac
- 2008 Irrewarra-Beeac
- 2009 Irrewarra-Beeac
- 2010 Irrewarra-Beeac
- 2011 Irrewarra-Beeac
- 2012 Colac Imperials
- 2013 Colac Imperials
- 2014 Colac Imperials
- 2015 South Colac
- 2016 South Colac
- 2017 Lorne
- 2018 Simpson
- 2019 Alvie
- 2020 No play due to COVID-19
- 2021 No play due to COVID-19
- 2022 Alvie
- 2023 Irrewarra-Beeac
- 2024 Alvie
- 2025 Colac Imperials
- 2026 Birregurra

Premierships Won:

Alvie: (12)

Apollo Bay: (2)

Birregurra: (5)

Colac Imperials: (8)

Lorne: (1)

Otway District: (0)

South Colac: (2)

Simpson: (1)

Irrewarra-Beeac: (17)

Western Eagles: (1)

Warrion: (4)

== Leading Goalkickers ==
Year	Player	H&A goals	Finals goals	Total Goals
1939	F Newcombe (Swan Marsh)	30	0	30
1940	0	0	0	0
1945	0	0	0	0
1946	0	0	0	0
1947	0	0	0	0
1948	Vin Lidgerwood (Colac Rovers)	102	14	116
1949	0	0	0	0
1950	0	0	0	0
1951	G Inglis (South Colac)	24	2	26
1952	0	0	0	0
1953	0	0	0	0
1954	0	0	0	0
1955	0	0	0	0
1956	E Dark (Pirron Yallock)	48	0	48
1957	0	0	0	0
1958	0	0	0	0
1959	John McDonald (Otway)	64	0	64
1960	Ivor Hider (Otway)	65	6	71
1961	Len Williamson (Alvie)	62	5	67
1962	Ken Speight (Otway)	80	2	82
1963	Ivor Hider (Otway)	74	0	74
1964	Stuart Reid (Colac Imps)	70	3	73
1965	Stuart Reid (Colac Imps)	82	11	93
1966	Len Williamson (Alvie)	69	7	76
1967	Ivor Hider (Otway)	100	1	101
1968	Neil Carr (Otway)	60	6	66
1969	David Fleming (Alvie)	104	7	111
1970	David Fleming (Alvie)	56	9	65
1971	David Fleming (Alvie)	71	5	76
1972	Larry Tannock (Apollo Bay)	86	8	94
1973	Graeme Wombwell (Sth Purrumbete)	110	5	115
1974	David Fleming (Alvie)	0	97	97
1975	David Fleming (Alvie)	75	3	78
1976	David Fleming (Alvie)	82	10	92
1977	Warren Cook (Pirron Yallock)	74	2	76
1978	Warren Cook (Pirron Yallock)	65	5	70
1979	Warren Cook (Pirron Yallock)	0	89	89
1980	David Wyles (Lorne)	88	0	88
1981	David Wyles (Lorne)	78	11	89
1982	Mike Cameron (Beeac)	92	1	93
1983	David Wyles (Lorne)	83	12	95
1984	Guy Permezel (Apollo Bay)	127	17	144
1985	Denis Phelps (Apollo Bay)	101	0	101
1986	Daryl Leak (Winchelsea)	0	107	107
1987	Guy Permezel (Apollo Bay)	104	0	104
1988	Daryl Leak (Winchelsea)	0	131	131
1989	Daryl Leak (Winchelsea)	0	80	80
1990	Brett Dwyer (Lorne)	102	7	109
1991	Stephen Worland (Winchelsea)	101	0	101
1992	Nick Lang (Alvie)	63	0	63
1993	Wayne Tyquin (Birregurra)	0	130	130
1994	Wayne Tyquin (Birregurra)	0	107	107
1995	Michael Coutts (Lorne)	62	14	76
1996	Alan Hoffman (Apollo Bay)	0	124	124
1997	Martin Stewart (Lorne)	153	15	168
1998	Michael Coutts (Lorne)	124	14	138
1999	Dean Holroyd (Lorne)	142	5	147
2000	James Mawson (Winchelsea)	0	103	103
2001	Dean Holroyd (Lorne)	117	7	124
2002	Brook Sheils (Lorne)	56	5	61
2003	Alan Hoffman (Alvie)	68	0	68
2004	Michael Coutts (Lorne)	91	4	95
2005	David Timms (Forrest)	97	5	102
2006	Christian Kelly (Alvie)	81	3	84
2007	David Timms (Forrest)	110	7	117
2008	Mark Whelan (Birregurra)	85	0	85
2009	Mark Whelan (Birregurra)	77	5	82
2010	Christian Kelly (Alvie)	98	6	104
2011	Ben Cox (South Colac)	73	12	85
2012	Christian Kelly (Birregurra)	62	10	72
2013	Luke Norton (Lorne)	57	1	58
2014	Christian Kelly (Birregurra)	63	11	74
2015	Ben Cox (South Colac)	104	8	112
2016	Ben Cox (South Colac)	95	5	100
2017	Christian Kelly (Birregurra)	86	8	94
2018	Tom Mullane-Grant (Otway Districts)	76	0	76
2019	Dominic Dare (Alvie)	83	4	87
2021	Dominic Dare (Alvie)	59	0	59
2022	Dominic Dare (Alvie)	87	7	94
2023	Dominic Dare (Alvie)	113	3	116
2024	Dominic Dare (Alvie)	74	2	76
2025	Dominic Dare (Alvie)	64	9	73
2026	Dominic Dare (Alvie)	95	9	104

== U15 Football Premierships ==
2009: Irrewarra Beeac 3.9 27 v 3.3 21 Otway

2010: Birregurra 5.5 35 v 2.1 13 Simpson

2011: Birregurra 4.8 32 v 1.4 10 Simpson

2012: Birregurra 5.4 34 v 2.3 15 South Colac

2013: South Colac 3.6 24 v 3.3 21 Colac Imperials

2014: South Colac 10.8 68 v 2.6 18 Alvie

2015: Lorne 6.3 39 v 4.6 30 Irrewarra Beeac

2016: Irrewarra Beeac 8.10 58 v 3.3 21 Birregurra

2017: Irrewarra Beeac 6.7 43 v 5.3 33 Birregurra

2018: Birregurra 6.6 42 v 4.4 28 Western Eagles

2019: Birregurra 3.2 20 v 2.2 14 Irrewarra Beeac

2020: No Play Due to COVID

2021: No Play Due to COVID

2022: Irrewarra Beeac 14.14 98 v 2.1 13 Apollo Bay

2023: Irrewarra Beeac 8.9 57 v 3.4 22 Birregurra

2024: South Colac 9.5 59 v 5.2 32 Western Eagles

2025: South Colac 12.4 76 v 1.3 9 Western Eagles

2026: Irrewarra Beeac 6.6 42 v 2.4 16 Western Eagles

Premierships Won:

Alvie: (0)

Apollo Bay: (0)

Birregurra: (5)

Colac Imperials: (0)

Lorne: (1)

Otway District: (0)

South Colac: (5)

Simpson: (0)

Irrewarra-Beeac: (6)

Western Eagles: (0)

== U18 Football Premierships ==
2009: Simpson 10.10 70 v 5.9 39 South Colac

2010: South Colac 14.10 94 v 3.2 20 Simpson

2011: Birregurra 10.9 69 v 8.8 56 South Colac

2012: Birregurra 7.10 52 v 0.8 8 Alvie

2013: Birregurra 6.4 40 v 5.5 35 Alvie

2014: Birregurra 14.13 97 v 5.4 34 Colac Imperials

2015: Birregurra 10.6 66 v 7.7 49 Apollo Bay

2016: Alvie 9.11 65 v 5.2 32 Apollo Bay

2017: Alvie 11.10 76 v 5.4 34 Simpson

2018: Irrewarra Beeac 5.5 35 v 3.7 25 Alvie

2019: Irrewarra Beeac 8.2 50 v 1.5 11 Lorne

2020: No Play Due to COVID

2021: No Play Due to COVID

2022: Lorne 10.5 65 v 2.5 17 Western Eagles

2023: Irrewarra Beeac 6.6 42 v 3.11 29 Lorne

2024: Birregurra 7.7 49 v 6.5 41 Irrewarra Beeac

2025: Apollo Bay 7.6 48 v 4.7 31 Irrewarra Beeac

2026: Lorne 9.11 65 v 5.13 43 Irrewarra Beeac

Premierships Won:

Alvie: (2)

Apollo Bay: (1)

Birregurra: (6)

Colac Imperials: (0)

Lorne: (2)

Otway: (0)

South Colac: (1)

Simpson: (1)

Irrewarra-Beeac: (3)

Western Eagles: (0)

== Senior Football League BNF ==
Winners: 2026: Samuel Torpy (Lorne)

2025: Bailey Scott (Colac Imperials)

2024: Bradley Circuit (South Colac)

2023: Tyler Flanigan (Irrewarra-Beeac)

2022: Levi Dare (Alvie)

2021: Bradley King (Apollo Bay)

2020: COVID-19 PANDEMIC

2019: Brent Macleod (Apollo Bay)

2018: Mark McCormack [2] (Lorne)

2017: Mark McCormack (L) / Jarrod Wight (AB)

2016: Liam McGuane (Alvie)

2015: Sean O’Neill (CI) / Khan Beckett [2] (IB)

2014: Corey Baulch (Simpson)

2013: Lee Hollmer (Lorne)

2012: Hamish Tamlin (Apollo Bay)

2011: Cameron Wright (B) / Dean Calcedo (F)

2010: Andrew Kelly [2] (Alvie)

2009: Khan Beckett (Irrewarra-Beeac)

2008: Andrew Kelly (Alvie)

2007: Daniel O’Kelly (Birregurra)

2006: Adam Harris [4] (CI) / Josh Rathke (F)

2005: Peter Featherston [2] (Apollo Bay)

2004: Adam Harris [3](Colac Imperials)

2003: Adam Harris [2] (CI) / Brett Taylor (SC)

2002: Adam Harris (Colac Imperials)

2001: Peter Featherston (Irrewarra-Beeac)

2000: Sam Korth (Winchelsea)

1999: Dwayne Stephens (IB) / Michael Parker A

1998: Richard Terrier (Lorne)

1997: Gavin Griffiths [2] (Lorne)

1996: Martin Mulgrew (South Colac)

1995: Gavin Griffiths (Lorne)

1994: Russell Scott (Birregurra)

1993: Peter Anson (Apollo Bay)

1992: Brendan Hammond (Alvie)

1991: David Mitchell (Winchelsea)

1990: Steve Finn [2] (A) / Rodney Barrett (B)

1989: Stewart Benyon (Birregurra)

1988: Steve Finn (Alvie)

1987: Alan Woodman (Winchelsea)

1986: Dennis Dare (Alvie)

1985: Geoff Balderas (Lorne)

1984: Harvey McKinnon (Beeac)

1983: William Alford (Winchelsea)

1982: Collin Perkins (Apollo Bay)

1981: Malcolm Smith (Lorne)

1980: Ray Berry (Gellibrand)

1979: Peter Barker (Birregurra)

1978: Martin Crump (Apollo Bay)

1977: John Boyd (South Purrembete)

1976: Lennie van Brugel (Forrest)

1975: Lance Gibb [2] (Apollo Bay)

1974: Lance Gibb (Apollo Bay)

1973: Patrick Whelan (Forrest)

1972: Erwin Babbington (Lorne)

1971: Ron Payne (South Colac)

1970: Bernie Foster [2] (South Purrembete)

1969: Bernie Foster (South Purrembete)

1968: Rob Milverton (South Colac)

1967: Michael Tonkin (CR) / Ross Sutherland (I)

1966: Russell Duncombe (Colac Imperials)

1965: R. McEwan (Beeac)

1964: L. Hill (Alvie)

1963: W. Leerson (Irrewillipe)

1962: B. Harkness (South Purrembete)

1961: J. Howard (South Purrembete)

1960: Graham Williamson (Alvie)

1959: Lenny Williamson (Alvie)

1958: Don O’Neill (Irrewarra)

1957: Jack Berry (Forrest)

1956: Peter West (Pirron Yallock)

1955: Max Gray (Warrion)

1954: Hugh McKay (Irrewarra)

1953: Ray Allen (Carlisle)

1952: A. Greenshields (Carlisle)

1951: Don Gardiner (Carlisle)

1950: Tom White (Alvie)

1949: Doug Grant [3] (BM) / W. Mathieson (I)

1948: J. Lineen (Coragulac)

1947: Doug Grant [2] (Beeac)

1946: Doug Grant (Beeac)
