= Tarneit Football Club =

Australian rules football club in Victoria

Names
- Full name: Tarneit Titans Football Club
- Nickname: Titans

Club details
- Founded: 2013; 13 years ago
- Colours
- Competition: Western Region Football League (2013–)
- President: Sue Thornton
- Coach: Vinnie Turcinovich
- Captain(s): Zach Thornton & Joshua Stone
- Premierships: 2018 (Reserves), 2019 (Reserves)
- Ground: Wootten Road Reserve, Tarneit

Other information
- Official website: https://www.tarneitfc.com/

The Tarneit Football Club is an Australian rules football club, based in the western Melbourne suburb of Tarneit, which have competed in the Western Region Football League (WRFL) since 2014.

Operating out of Wootten Road Reserve in Tarneit.

As of the 2019 season, Tarneit is represented by seven junior teams, ranging from under 10s to under 16s; a senior women's team; and senior men's and reserves teams.

== History ==
=== 2014 - 2015: Formation and early years ===
The formation of the Tarneit Football Club was officially announced by the WRFL in 2013, following the recognition of the rapidly increasing population in the outer west and the recent development of an Australian Rules facility on Wootten Road.

Tarneit was ultimately established in 2014, and in its inaugural year the club were able to field two senior and three junior teams, alongside successfully hosting local football finals at the Wootten Road venue. Starting initially in Division 2 grading, the club made history with its first senior men's victory in Round 1, scoring a 79 point win over the North Sunshine Roadrunners.

The 2015 season consisted of lukewarm success for Tarneit; aided by the introduction of a Division 3 competition, the senior men's team increased their win tally to five games and the reserves men's side winning thirteen games and playing in the club's first final. Tarneit was also able to sustain its junior program in 2015, fielding three junior teams.

=== 2016 - 2017: Increased participation and drastic improvement ===
After two inaugural years of limited success, 2016 marked a drastic improvement in the club's on-field performances following the appointments of Mark Elso and Cam Evans as senior and reserves men's coach respectively. The senior men's side was able to secure its first ever finals victory after finishing the season in third position, whilst the reserve side featured in the club's first men's Grand Final - ultimately succumbing to Parkside by eight points. Similarly, the club experienced its first success in the junior ranks, with the Under 12s side playing in the club's first junior Grand Final.

The success of the previous year resulted in significant growth for the club in 2017, reflected by the introduction of Tarneit's first senior women's team and junior girls sides; contributing to a total of nine teams for the season. Although the women's team finished on the bottom of the table, another milestone for the club was achieved with the side securing their first ever victory against the Glen Orden Football Club

Tarneit's senior men also made history, with their qualification into the Division 3 Grand Final representing the club's first ever - an achievement that was soured by a loss to rivals Parkside by 41 points.

=== 2018: Tarneit's first taste of success ===
Following the performances of 2017, expectations for the men's teams were high, particularly following the re-signing of Elso and Evans for 2018. After finishing the season in second place - in a season where they scored a victory against each team - Tarneit's senior men's side could not improve on the previous year, crashing out of finals in straight sets following losses to Point Cook Centrals and the Wyndham Suns respectively.

Conversely, the reserves side were able to bounce back from a straight sets knockout in 2017 and finish the 2018 season as Minor Premiers en route to winning the club's first ever Premiership, with a one point victory over the Point Cook Centrals.

Tarneit also were able to maintain their junior numbers, with six junior sides representing the Titans alongside the senior men's, senior women's and reserve's sides.

=== 2019: Reserves back-to-back and continued growth ===
Tarneit's senior sides aimed to build on the momentum of their 2019 campaigns, and after five rounds looked strong with both sides undefeated at the top end of the ladder. This served to be a sliding doors moment for the teams; with the senior men going at a record of seven wins, six losses before crashing out in finals, while the reserves ultimately backed up their 2018 campaign with a 32 point victory in the Grand Final against the Albanvale Football Club.

The club's senior women's side also reveled in their own successes, with four wins for the season representing their strongest performance in Tarneit's short history.

=== 2020: COVID-19 and new senior coach ===
Due to the impact of COVID-19, the 2020 WRFL senior and junior seasons were cancelled respectively.

Following the cancellation of the senior season, Justin Palmer was announced as senior coach for 2021.

== Club Song ==
Sung to the tune of Keep Your Sunny Side Up

See the Titans fire up, up.
To win the premiership flag.
Our boys who bring their hardened game.
Are always striving for glory and fame.
See the Titans fire up, up.
The other teams they don't fear.
Tarneit are the best.
We will beat the rest.
As the Titans fire up!

== Honour Roll ==
Senior Men's Honour Board
Season	Coach	Captain (s)	Best & Fairest	Leading Goalkicker	Division	Finishing Position
2014	Max de Groot	Ash Fletcher	Thomas Robertson	Jason Seduikis (13)	WRFL - Div. 3	6/6
2015	Max de Groot	Ash Fletcher	Corey Mackey	Aaron Doughty (20)	WRFL - Div. 3	6/7
2016	Mark Elso	Todd Lawrie	Todd Lawrie	Todd Lawrie (32)	WRFL - Div. 3	3/9
2017	Mark Elso	Todd Lawrie	Todd Lawrie	Chris Benson/Aaron Molivas (44)	WRFL - Div. 3	3/8; Runners Up
2018	Mark Elso	Todd Lawrie	Tom Weybury	John Zangari (41)	WRFL - Div. 3	2/8
2019	Mark Elso	Adam Miriklis	Todd Lawrie	John Zangari (37)	WRFL - Div. 3	4/8
2021	Justin Palmer	Zac Gillard Ty Priest	Michael Jubb	Ryan Potter (22)	WRFL - Div. 3	5/7
2022	Brent Sheean	Zac Gillard	Luke Timms		WRFL - Div. 3	
2023	Brent Sheean	Zach Thornton Joshua Stone	Zach Thornton Micheal Naawi			

Reserves Men's Honour Board
Season	Coach	Captain (s)	Best & Fairest	Leading Goalkicker	Division	Finishing Position
2014	Danny Andjelkovic	Anthony Whyte	Reece Dimech	Brad Lancaster (9)	WRFL - Div. 3	6/6
2015	Neil Dutson	Cory Desira Joseph Mallia	Reece Frost	Tyson Szkudlarski (23)	WRFL - Div. 3	3/7
2016	Cameron Evans	Zach Thornton	Cody Ebbels	Troy Whiting (57)	WRFL - Div. 3	2/9; Runners Up
2017	Cameron Evans	Reece Frost	Matthew Lawrence	Samuel Ingham (52)	WRFL - Div. 3	2/8
2018	Cameron Evans	Reece Frost	Reece Frost	Jason Seduikis (50)	WRFL - Div. 3	1/8; Premiers
2019	Heath Hunter	Zac Gillard Sean Taylor	Sean Taylor	Heath Hunter (53)	WRFL - Div. 3	1/8; Premiers
2021	Arthur Arabit	Sean Taylor	Nick Williams	James di Blasi (8)	WRFL - Div. 3	6/7
2022	Arthur Arabit	Josh Watterson	Jordan Depetro	Declan Drummond	WRFL - Div. 3	5/7
2023	Arthur Arabit	Nick Williams	Cory Desira	Nick Williams	WRFL - Div.3	4/7
2024	Max de Groot					

Senior Women's Honour Board
Season	Coach	Captain (s)	Best & Fairest	Leading Goalkicker	Division	Finishing Position
2017	Brandon Stone	Suzzanne Hillis	Madeline Johnson	Madeline Johnson	WRFL & EDFL Women's	11/11
2018	Brandon Stone	Madeline Johnson	Emma Quinn	Emma Quinn	WRFL - Women's	8/9
2019	Brandon Stone	Paige van Hulst	Madeline Johnson	Madeline Johnson (8)	WRFL - Women's	11/13

WRFL League Best & Fairest Winners
Season	Best and Fairest Winner	Division
2016	Jayden Smithers	Under 11 - West
2016	Monique Gavriliadis	Under 12 - Division 3
2016	Todd Lawrie	Division 3 - Senior
2017	Dakodah Cott	Under 15 Girls - Division 1
2017	Jamie Cowlishaw	Division 3 - Reserves
2018	Reece Frost	Division 3 - Reserves
2019	Sarah Poni	Under 15 Girls - Division 1
2019	Todd Lawrie	Division 3 - Senior
2023	Aaron Campbell	Division 3 - Reserves
