= North Sunshine Football Club =

North Sunshine

Names
- Full name: North Sunshine Football Club
- Nickname: Roadrunners

Club details
- Founded: 1967; 59 years ago
- Colours
- Competition: Western Region Football League (1979–)
- President: Jeremy Hibbert
- Coach: Rob Telfer
- Premierships: 2 (1986, 2003)
- Ground: Dempster Park, Sunshine North,.

Uniforms
Home

Other information
- Official website: https://www.facebook.com/northsunshinefootballclub

The North Sunshine Football Club is an Australian rules football club that has competed in the Western Region Football League since 1967. It is based in the Melbourne suburb of Sunshine North, Victoria.

== History ==
Founded in 1967 as Crossroads Football Club, initially it operated solely as a junior club, fielding, in its inaugural year U/9's, U/11's and U/13's.

In the ensuing years a U/15 and U/17 side was fielded, and this remained the makeup of the club until 1979 which then saw the inclusion of a seniors side.

In 1994 North Sunshine added to its stocks by entering a Reserve grade side in the competition. The effect of fielding a full complement of junior and senior sides had an almost instantaneous effect on the club, with 1986 seeing the senior side take out their divisions Grand Final.

As the years rolled on, a third senior side was fielded in 1990, and a 'Superules' side in 1991. The new millennium saw North Sunshine Reserves win a Grand Final in 2000 and the senior side win their division Grand Final in 2003.

With a new coach in 2014 and many new players, the club got itself off the bottom of the ladder for the first time in 6 years.

Playing in the newly formed 3rd division, they beat Tarneit to take themselves off the bottom of the ladder, playing a competitive, hard brand of football against many of the other division 3 teams.

At the end of the 2014 season 7 new members joined the committee to give it a full complement of 10.

=== 2022 – present: New beginnings ===
Following the club's 2022 annual general meeting, former seniors coach Andrew Scimone was elected to the position of club president, leaving the position of seniors coach vacant.

On 23 January 2023, former Tarneit, Glen Orden and Manor Lakes seniors coach Max De Groot was unveiled as North Sunshine's seniors coach for the 2023 season.

Following another winless season for the North Sunshine seniors, Max De Groot would leave the club at the end of the season.

After another winless season in 2024, the Roadrunners advertised for a new senior coach going forward, appointing Paul Rossiter for the next 3 seasons.

== Song ==
Ohhhhh for it’s a grand old team we play for,

for it’s a grand old team we know,

and if, you know, the history,

it’s enough to make your hearts go oh oh oh,

we don’t care what the other team says,

for what the hell do we care,

for we always know that there’s gonna be a show,

when the boys from North Sunshine will be there.

Meep Meep!

== Premierships ==
- Western Region Football League
  - Division Two (2): 1986, 2003

== Bibliography ==
- History of the WRFL/FDFL by Kevin Hillier – ISBN 9781863356015
- History of football in Melbourne's north west by John Stoward – ISBN 9780980592924
