= Western Eagles Football Netball Club =

Western Eagles

Names
- Full name: Western Eagles Football Netball Club
- Nickname: Eagles

Club details
- Founded: 1996; 30 years ago
- Colours: blue white gold
- Competition: Colac & District FNL
- Premierships: none
- Ground: Irrewillipe Recreation Reserve

Uniforms
Home

The Western Eagles Football Netball Club is an Australian rules football and netball club which competes in the Colac DFL since 1996. They are based in the Victorian town of Irrewillipe. Irrewillipe is about twelve miles east of Colac .

== History ==
The Western Eagles Football Club has competed in the Colac DFL since 1996. They are the result of a merger between the Pirron Yallock Football club and the Irrewillipe Football clubs in 1996. Both clubs were members of the Colac DFL until rural decline forced the clubs to merge because of lack of players.

Since the merge the club has made the finals on four occasions, 1998, 1999 2001 and 2004. Since then the club has struggled on the field, finishing last or second last every year since 2006. They have won only fourteen games in their last 118 matches.

=== Former clubs ===
Colors	Club	Nickname	Founded	Years in CDFL	Premiers won	Premiership Years
	Pirron Yallock	Tigers	1887	1940, 1949, 1954–95	1	1924
	Irrewillipe	Bulldogs	1938	1938–95	4	1953, 1955, 1971, 1992

== Bibliography ==
- Cat Country - History of Football In The Geelong Region by John Stoward - ISBN 978-0-9577515-8-3
- Football Country Style: a history of football in the Colac District from 1900-1974 - Bill Doran
