= AFL Barwon Female Football =

Australian rules football competition

- Sport: Australian rules football
- Founded: 2018; 8 years ago
- No. of teams: 20
- Country: Australia
- Confederation: AFL Barwon
- Most recent champions: Geelong Amateur (Div 1); Lara (Div 2) (2026)
- Most titles: Geelong Amateur (4× Div 1)
- Sponsor: Epworth Health
- Related competitions: GFL, GDFL, BFL, CDFL
- Website: AFL Barwon

AFL Barwon Female Football is a women's Australian rules football competition based in the greater Geelong region. The first season of senior football held for women in the area was 2018. The senior competition has since swelled to multiple divisions incorporating 19 teams. A further eight underage girls divisions are also competed for in the 2023 season.

== Background ==
AFL Barwon is the governing body overseeing Australian rules football in the Geelong and greater district. After many years in which only junior girl's competitions were organised, a senior women's football competition commenced in 2018 under the banner of AFL Barwon Women's Football. Rather than being organised by the GFL, GDFL, or the BFL, the competition is managed under the AFL Barwon banner. The competition was renamed to AFL Barwon Female Football ahead of the 2019 season.

2018 inaugural season competing teams:

- Bellarine Football League:

Barwon Heads; Drysdale; Geelong Amateur; Ocean Grove

- Geelong Football League:

Grovedale; Lara; St Joseph's; St Mary's

- Geelong & District Football League:

Bell Post Hill; Geelong West Giants; North Geelong

- Colac & District Football League:

Colac Imperials

The competition has held grading games at the start of the seasons in 2018, 2021–2024 in order to compose divisions to try to make matches as competitive as possible.

In March 2024, following extensive consultation AFL Barwon announced that the competition would transition from playing mostly on Sundays to scheduling Saturday matches from 2025.

== Current clubs ==
=== Division 1 ===
Club	Colours	Nickname	Home Ground	Former League	Est.	AFL Barwon Seasons	AFL Barwon Senior Premierships	
Club	Colours	Nickname	Home Ground	Former League	Est.	AFL Barwon Seasons	Total	Most recent
Barwon Heads		Seagulls	Howard Harmer Reserve, Barwon Heads	—	1922	2018–	1	2018
Geelong Amateur		Ammos, Pegasus	Queens Park, Highton	—	1926	2018–	4	2026
Grovedale		Tigers	Burdoo Reserve, Grovedale	—	1947	2018–	1	2024
Geelong West Giants		Giants	West Oval, North Geelong	—	2017	2018–	1	2022
Portarlington		Demons	Portarlington Recreation Reserve, Portarlington	—	1874	2026–	0	—
South Barwon		Swans	McDonald Reserve, Belmont	—	1990	2021–	1	2025
St Joseph's		Joeys	Herne Hill Reserve, Herne Hill	—	1973	2018–	1	2022
St Mary's		Saints	Kardinia Park West, South Geelong	—	1953	2018–	1	2019

=== Division 2 ===
Club	Colours	Nickname	Home Ground	Former League	Est.	AFL Barwon Seasons	AFL Barwon Senior Premierships	
Club	Colours	Nickname	Home Ground	Former League	Est.	AFL Barwon Seasons	Total	Most recent
Anglesea		Roos	Ellimatta Reserve, Anglesea	—	1963	2021–	2	2024
Barwon Heads reserves/Ocean Grove		Seagulls/Grubbers	Howard Harmer Reserve, Barwon Heads and Shell Road Reserve, Ocean Grove	—	2026	2026–	0	—
Bell Park		Dragons	Hamlyn Park, Bell Park	—	1958	2026–	0	—
Belmont Lions		Lions	Winter Reserve, Belmont	—	1965	2024–	1	2024
Drysdale		Hawks	Drysdale Recreational Reserve, Drysdale	—	1879	2018–	0	—
Grovedale reserves		Tigers	Burdoo Reserve, Grovedale	—	1947	2018–	1	2024
Lara		Cats	Lara Recreation Reserve, Lara	—	1880	2018–	1	2026
Modewarre		Warriors	Mt Moriac Recreation Reserve, Mount Moriac	—	1879	2023–	1	2023
St Albans/Thomson		Supersaints, Tigers	St Albans Reserve, Thomson and Thomson Recreation Reserve, Thomson	—	2026	2026–	0	—
St Joseph's reserves		Joeys	Herne Hill Reserve, Herne Hill	—	1973	2018–	1	2022
St Mary's reserves/Geelong Amateur reserves		Saints, Ammos, Pegasus	Kardinia Park West, South Geelong and Queens Park, Highton	—	1953	2018–	1	2019
Torquay		Tigers	Spring Creek Reserve, Torquay	—	1952	2019–	0	—

== Former clubs ==
Club	Colours	Nickname	Home Ground	Former League	Est.	AFL Barwon Seasons	AFL Barwon Senior Premierships		Fate
Club	Colours	Nickname	Home Ground	Former League	Est.	AFL Barwon Seasons	Total	Most recent	Fate
Bell Post Hill		Panthers	Myers Reserve, Bell Post Hill	—	1976	2018	0	-	In recess
Colac Imperials		Imperials	Western Reserve, Colac	—	1922	2018–2021	0	-	In recess
Newtown & Chilwell		Eagles	Elderslie Reserve, Newtown	—	1933	2021–2025	0	—	In recess
North Geelong		Magpies	Osborne Park, North Geelong	VWFL	1876	2018–2025	2	2019	In recess

== Premiers ==
=== Division 1 ===
†	Team also won the minor premiership for finishing on top of the ladder

Season	Premiers	Runners-up	Score	Venue	Best on ground	Ref.
2018	North Geelong†	St Mary's	6.5 (41) d. 2.3 (15)	Burdoo Reserve	—N/a	
2019	St Mary's	Geelong Amateur	6.4 (40) d. 4.5 (29)	Bisinella Oval	—N/a	
2020	Season cancelled due to ongoing COVID-19 pandemic in Australia.					
2021	Not awarded					
2022	Geelong Amateur†	St Mary's	4.5 (29) d. 0.3 (3)	Herne Hill Reserve	Cheryl de Groot (Geelong Amateur)	
2023	Geelong Amateur†	Grovedale	4.10 (34) d. 2.1 (13)	Herne Hill Reserve	Danielle Sgarbi (Geelong Amateur)	
2024	Grovedale†	Geelong Amateur	2.8 (20) d. 1.6 (12)	Bisinella Oval	Taylah Hassett (Grovedale)	
2025	Geelong Amateur†	Grovedale	4.9 (33) d. 3.1 (19)	Bisinella Oval	Bella Hill (Geelong Amateur)	
2026	Geelong Amateur†	Grovedale	6.7 (43) d. 4.8 (32)	Bisinella Oval	Lucy Ware (Geelong Amateur)	

=== Division 2 ===
†	Team also won the minor premiership for finishing on top of the ladder

Season	Premiers	Runners-up	Score	Venue	Best on ground	Ref.
2018	Barwon Heads	Colac Imperials	4.9 (33) d. 4.8 (32)	Burdoo Reserve	—N/a	
2019	North Geelong†	Drysdale	3.8 (26) d. 0.1 (1)	Bisinella Oval	—N/a	
2020	Season cancelled due to ongoing COVID-19 pandemic in Australia.					
2021	Not awarded					
2022	St Joseph's†	Torquay	5.3 (33) d. 3.2 (20)	Herne Hill Reserve	Tamika Lewis (St Joseph's)	
2023	Geelong West Giants†	Thomson	3.5 (23) d. 3.4 (22)	Herne Hill Reserve	Teagan Tatlock (Thomson)	
2024	Anglesea	St Joseph's	5.9 (39) d. 3.5 (23)	Bisinella Oval	Ella Nickolaus (Angelsea)	
2025	South Barwon	Geelong West Giants	4.6 (30) d. 3.6 (24)	Bisinella Oval	Elara Dillon (South Barwon)	
2026	Lara	Torquay	8.9 (57) d. 2.8 (20)	Bisinella Oval		

=== Division 3 ===
†	Team also won the minor premiership for finishing on top of the ladder

Season	Premiers	Runners-up	Score	Venue	Best on ground	Ref.
2021	Not awarded					
2022	Anglesea†	South Barwon	6.6 (42) d. 2.3 (15)	Herne Hill Reserve	Ruby Manson (Anglesea)	
2023	Modewarre	North Geelong	6.0 (36) d. 1.8 (14)	Herne Hill Reserve	Monique Martin (Modewarre)	
2024	Belmont Lions†	Modewarre	1.7 (13) d. 1.2 (8)	Bisinella Oval	Ashleigh Feehan (Belmont)	
2025	Division not held					
2026	Division not held					

== Best and Fairest Award ==
Division 1

- 2018 — Charlotte Thorne (North Geelong) 39 votes
- 2019 — Stephanie Abfalter (Geelong Amateur) 19 votes
- 2021 — Isabella Hill (Grovedale) 21 votes
- 2022 — Alana Tully (Grovedale)
- 2023 — Danielle Sgarbi (Geelong Amateur)
- 2024 — Janessa Fitzgerald (Grovedale) 19 votes
- 2025 — Phoebe Monahan (Thomson) 28 votes
- 2026 — Isabella Hill (Geelong Amateur) 24 votes

Division 2

- 2018 — Emma Allen (Barwon Heads) 23 votes
- 2019 — Charlotte Thorne (North Geelong) 27 votes
- 2021 — Temikka Beeston (North Geelong) 18 votes
- 2022 — Tara Smith (Drysdale)
- 2023 — Daisy Wilson (South Barwon)
- 2024 — Elara Dillon (South Barwon) 19 votes
- 2025 — Elara Dillon (South Barwon 30 votes
- 2026 — Ailish Tyrrell (St Albans/Thompson); Kara Stacey (Lara); Lahnee Firth (Anglesea) 18 votes

Division 3

- 2021 — Charlotte Simpson (St Joseph's) 18 votes
- 2022 — Maggie Caudullo
- 2023 — Tara Smith (Drysdale)
- 2024 — Monique Martin (Modewarre) 14 votes

== Leading Goalkickers ==
Division 1

- 2018 — Ashleigh Bond (St Mary's) 28 goals
- 2019 — Ashleigh Bond (St Mary's) 23 goals
- 2021 — Bianca Cheever (St Mary's) & Rhianna Arnold (Geelong Amateur) 16 goals
- 2022 — Allesha McLean (St Mary's) 25 goals
- 2023 — Lucy Were (Geelong Amateur) 23 goals
- 2024 — Emily Kenshole (Thomson) 27 goals
- 2025 — Lillee Barendsen (Geelong Amateur) 51 goals
- 2026 — Bella Gilham (St Joseph's) 50 goals

Division 2

- 2018 — Teagan Barber (Colac Imperials) 23 goals
- 2019 — Melissa Egan (Drysdale) 61 goals
- 2021 — Melissa Egan (Drysdale) 20 goals
- 2022 — Bianca Deckker (Drysdale) 28 goals
- 2023 — Emily Kenshole (Thomson) 31 goals
- 2024 — Bella Gilham (St Joseph's) 32 goals
- 2025 — Neave Dickson (Newtown & Chilwell) 41 goals
- 2026 — Victoria Paapa-Silva (Lara) 47 goals

Division 3

- 2021 — Charlotte Simpson (St Joseph's), Rebekah Lane (South Barwon) & Camille King (Anglesea) 21 goals
- 2022 — Rebekah Lane (South Barwon) 28 goals
- 2023 — Bianca Deckker (Drysdale) 24 goals
- 2024 — Dakota Harrington (St Albans) 24 goals

== Sponsorship ==
The divisions has had the following organisations as naming rights partner for each season:

- 2018:

Epworth Health (Division 1)
Corio Bay Health Group (Division 2)

- 2019, 2021–present:

Epworth Health (Divisions 1–3)

== Representative matches ==
In May 2019, an AFL Barwon Female Football representative team coached by Geelong AFLW player Melissa Hickey, and captained by Barwon Heads' Emma Allen, played the Northern Football Netball League.

2019 WorkSafe AFL Victoria Championships
Saturday, 18 May 2019 (9:50 am)	AFL Barwon Female Football	def.	Northern Football Netball League	Queens Park, Highton	Report
2.3 (15); 2.4 (16); 3.6 (24); 5.7 (37)	Q1; Q2; Q3; Final	0.1 (1); 0.4 (4); 1.5 (11); 2.7 (19)
E. Allen 3, L. McClelland, T. Knox	Goals	S. Cross, T. Olcorn
E. Allen, E. Oliver, S. O'Dea, C. Thorne, M. Janssen	Best	C. O'Bryan, N. Blythe, K. Cobern, D. Bonde, S. Nyawela, D. Hallett
