= Polwarth Football League =

Australian football competition

- Formerly: Polwarth Football Association (1922–1949)
- Sport: Australian rules football
- Founded: 1922
- Folded: 1970
- Country: Australia
- Last champion: Winchelsea (1970)
- Most titles: Winchelsea (10)
- Related competitions: Bellarine FL; Colac & District FL

The Polwarth Football League (PFL) was an Australian rules football competition based in south-west rural Victoria. Named for the electoral district of Polwarth, which encapsulated numerous competing clubs, the league was established as the Polwarth Football Association (PFA) in 1922, before it was renamed as the Polwarth Football League in 1950.

The league's final season took place in 1970; six of the league's eight teams then migrated to the newly formed Bellarine & District Football League for 1971, with the remaining two (Apollo Bay and Lorne) commencing in the Colac & District Football League.

== History ==
The first Polwarth Football Association season was conducted

The McDonald Cup, the trophy for which clubs were originally presented upon winning the premiership, was first introduced in 1929. The cup was initiated by and named after local politician James McDonald, who died in 1933; before his passing, he specified that no club could permanently hold the trophy until every club had held it at least once. However, Winchelsea was given outright ownership of the cup after winning a trifecta of premierships from 1937 to 1939.

In September 1939, the association announced that teams would next year compete for the Marjorie Lawrence Cup, named for Australian soprano singer Marjorie Lawrence, a Deans Marsh local who had left the area to study music.

However, by 1941, the Polwarth Association was put on hold due to Australia's increasing involvement in World War II. The competition would not return until 1946.

In 1950 there was a mass exodus of clubs from the Colac & District Football League, the cause was that the Colac (Hampden league) team wanted to have the right to pick any player from the Colac DFL without needing a clearance. The result was Colac Imperials and Coragulac opted to leave and join the Polwarth FL and be away from Colac's reach. Beeac had a short stint in the Western Plains FL for two years before also joining the Polwarth FL.

After a couple of years the threat of Colac poaching their players had ceased, the Colac Imperials returned to the CDFL in 1955. Deans Marsh succumbed to player shortage and that was offset by the introduction of Queenscliff in 1957. Coragulac got permission to join the Hampden League in 1961 and Beeac returned to the Colac DFL.

Seeking new clubs, the league admitted Torquay in 1964 and then Leopold and Portarlington in 1965. Birregurra after a run of poor seasons went into recess after unsuccessfully applying to change to the Colac DFL. With the balance of the league shifting closer to Geelong the idea was floated to introduce more clubs closer to Geelong. Knowing that their little town didn't have the catchment to lure players as the other clubs did, Forrest transferred to the Colac DFL in 1969. The other clubs voted to form the Bellarine DFL and blocked Lorne and Apollo Bay from joining. These clubs were forced to join the Colac DFL making it the largest country football league at the time.

== Clubs ==
=== Final clubs ===
| Club | Colours | Nickname | Home Ground | Former League | Est. | Years in comp | PFL Senior Premierships | | Fate |
| Club | Colours | Nickname | Home Ground | Former League | Est. | Years in comp | Total | Years | Fate |
|---|---|---|---|---|---|---|---|---|---|
| Apollo Bay | (1950s)(?-1970) | Cats | Apollo Bay Recreation Reserve, Apollo Bay | OFA | 1900s | 1929-1930, 1933, 1935-1970 | 0 | - | Played in Otway FA in 1931-32 and 1934. Moved to Colac & District FL in 1971 |
| Leopold | | Lions | Leopold Memorial Park, Leopold | GDFL | 1955 | 1965-1970 | 0 | - | Formed the Bellarine FL in 1971 |
| Lorne | | Magpies | Stribling Reserve, Lorne | W&BFA | 1896 | 1929-1970 | 8 | 1933, 1935, 1940, 1946, 1947, 1948, 1949, 1950 | Moved to Colac & District FL in 1971 |
| Ocean Grove | | Grubbers | Shell Road Reserve, Ocean Grove | GDFL | 1964 | 1969-1970 | 0 | - | Formed the Bellarine FL in 1971 |
| Portarlington | | Demons | Portarlington Recreation Reserve, Portarlington | GDFL | 1874 | 1964-1970 | 0 | - | Formed the Bellarine FL in 1971 |
| Queenscliff | | Coutas | Queenscliff Recreation Reserve, Queenscliff | GDFL | 1928 | 1957-1970 | 7 | 1961, 1962, 1963, 1964, 1965, 1967, 1968 | Formed the Bellarine FL in 1971 |
| Torquay | | Tigers | Spring Creek Reserve, Torquay | GDFL | 1952 | 1964-1970 | 0 | - | Formed the Bellarine FL in 1971 |
| Winchelsea | (1925)(1925-36)(1937-70) | Blues | Eastern Reserve, Winchelsea | W&BFA | 1876 | 1923-1970 | 10 | 1924, 1926, 1932, 1937, 1938, 1939, 1951, 1957, 1960, 1969, 1970 | Formed the Bellarine FL in 1971 |

=== Former clubs ===
| Club | Colours | Nickname | Home Ground | Former League | Est. | Years in comp | PFL Senior Premierships | | Fate |
| Club | Colours | Nickname | Home Ground | Former League | Est. | Years in comp | Total | Years | Fate |
|---|---|---|---|---|---|---|---|---|---|
| Beeac | | Tigers | Beeac Recreation Reserve, Beeac | WPFL | 1890 | 1952-1961 | 1 | 1956 | Moved to Colac & District FL in 1962 |
| Birregurra | | Saints | Birregurra Recreation Reserve, Birregurra | W&BFA | 1883 | 1922-1965 | 5 | 1927, 1928, 1930, 1935, 1955 | Entered recess in 1966, re-formed in Colac & District FL in 1967 |
| Colac Diggers (Memorial Rooms 1922-23) | | Diggers | Colac Showgrounds, Colac | – | 1922 | 1922-1924 | 1 | 1923 | 1924-46 unknown. Re-formed in Colac & District FL in 1947 |
| Colac Imperials | | Cats | Western Reserve, Colac | CDFL | 1922 | 1950-1954 | 0 | - | Returned to Colac & District FL in 1955 |
| Colac Rovers | | Rovers | Colac Showgrounds, Colac | CFL | 1900s | 1922-1924 | 1 | 1922 | Returned to Corangamite FL in 1925 |
| Coragulac | | Rovers | O'Shea Paddock, Coragulac | CDFL | 1937 | 1950-1960 | 3 | 1953, 1958, 1959 | Moved to Hampden FL in 1961 |
| Deans Marsh | | The Marsh, Blood and Bandages | Deans Marsh Recreation Reserve, Deans Marsh | W&BFA, CFL | 1900s | 1922-1930, 1932-1957 | 1 | 1929 | Played in Corangamite FL in 1931. Folded after 1957 season |
| Forrest | | Lions | Forrest Recreation Reserve, Forrest | W&BFA | 1891 | 1922-1969 | 6 | 1925, 1931, 1934, 1952, 1954, 1966 | Moved to Colac & District FL in 1970 |
| Inverleigh | | | Inverleigh Recreation Reserve, Inverleigh | LDFA | 1870s | 1926 | 0 | - | Moved to Mathieson Trophy competition in 1927 |
| Mount Moriac | | | Mount Moriac Recreation Reserve, Mount Moriac | FCDFA | 1878 | 1922-1926 | 0 | - | Moved to Geelong Athletic Society FL in 1927, now known as Modewarre |

== Premiers ==
| Season | Premiers | Runners-up | Score | Ref. |
|---|---|---|---|---|
| 1922 | Colac Rovers | Birregurra | 4.6 (30) d. 3.2 (20) | |
| 1923 | Memorial Rooms | Colac Rovers | 9.20 (74) d. 1.5 (11) | |
| 1924 | Winchelsea | Colac Rovers | 5.8 (38) d. 3.6 (24) | |
| 1925 | Forrest | Deans Marsh | 9.9 (63) d. 4.5 (29) | |
| 1926 | Winchelsea (2) | Inverleigh | 6.8 (44) d. 3.4 (24) | |
| 1927 | Birregurra | Forrest | 7.14 (56) d. 8.6 (54) | |
| 1928 | Birregurra (2) | Deans Marsh | 13.9 (87) d. 12.13 (85) | |
| 1929 | Deans Marsh | Birregurra | 3.10 (28) d. 3.6 (24) | |
| 1930 | Birregurra (3) | Deans Marsh | 7.16 (58) d. 8.8 (56) | |
| 1931 | Forrest (2) | Lorne | 9.7 (61) d. 6.10 (46) | |
| 1932 | Winchelsea (3) | Forrest | 16.16 (112) d. 5.8 (38) | |
| 1933 | Lorne | Deans Marsh | 16.9 (105) d. 6.8 (44) | |
| 1934 | Forrest (3) | Deans Marsh | 12.14 (86) d. 7.10 (52) | |
| 1935 | Birregurra (4) | Forrest | 20.19 (139) d. 14.10 (94) | |
| 1936 | Lorne (2) | Winchelsea | 13.16 (94) d. 13.13 (91) | |
| 1937 | Winchelsea (4) | Lorne | 12.16 (88) d. 12.7 (79) | |
| 1938 | Winchelsea (5) | Deans Marsh | 15.13 (103) d. 14.13 (97) | |
| 1939 | Winchelsea (6) | Deans Marsh | 9.13 (67) d. 6.6 (42) | |
| 1940 | Lorne (3) | Forrest | 8.15 (63) d. 5.8 (38) | |
| No competition 1941–1945 due to World War II | | | | |
| 1946 | Lorne (4) | Winchelsea | 16.11 (107) d. 7.6 (48) | |
| 1947 | Lorne (5) | Winchelsea | 21.12 (138) d. 8.16 (64) | |
| 1948 | Lorne (6) | Deans Marsh | 9.5 (59) d. 7.4 (46) | |
| 1949 | Lorne (7) | Winchelsea | 6.15 (51) drew 6.15 (51) | |
| 1949 | Lorne (7) | Winchelsea | 9.22 (76) d. 7.7 (49) | |
| Polwarth Football League name adopted | | | | |
| 1950 | Lorne (8) | Winchelsea | 15.8 (98) d. 10.7 (67) | |
| 1951 | Winchelsea (7) | Birregurra | 9.12 (66) d. 6.8 (44) | |
| 1952 | Forrest (4) | Lorne | 15.19 (109) d. 7.6 (48) | |
| 1953 | Coragulac | Forrest | 14.8 (92) d. 10.11 (71) | |
| 1954 | Forrest (5) | Winchelsea | 7.10 (52) d. 7.8 (50) | |
| 1955 | Birregurra (5) | Coragulac | 6.9 (45) d. 4.9 (33) | |
| 1956 | Beeac | Birregurra | 5.7 (37) d. 3.4 (22) | |
| 1957 | Winchelsea (8) | Forrest | 11.15 (81) d. 10.17 (77) | |
| 1958 | Coragulac (2) | Winchelsea | 9.16 (70) d. 8.16 (64) | |
| 1959 | Coragulac (3) | Queenscliff | 9.16 (70) d. 8.7 (55) | |
| 1960 | Winchelsea (8) | Lorne | 17.16 (118) d. 16.10 (106) | |
| 1961 | Queenscliff | Winchelsea | 9.24 (78) d. 9.6 (60) | |
| 1962 | Queenscliff (2) | Apollo Bay | 8.16 (64) d. 8.9 (57) | |
| 1963 | Queenscliff (3) | Apollo Bay | 12.8 (80) d. 10.14 (74) | |
| 1964 | Queenscliff (4) | Torquay | 10.14 (74) d. 1.4 (10) | |
| 1965 | Queenscliff (5) | Winchelsea | 9.13 (67) d. 6.8 (44) | |
| 1966 | Forrest (6) | Queenscliff | 8.13 (61) d. 5.14 (44) | |
| 1967 | Queenscliff (6) | Torquay | 9.23 (77) d. 5.12 (42) | |
| 1968 | Queenscliff (7) | Winchelsea | 11.16 (82) d. 10.9 (69) | |
| 1969 | Winchelsea (9) | Queenscliff | 21.15 (141) d. 6.16 (52) | |
| 1970 | Winchelsea (10) | Leopold | 14.9 (93) d. 8.12 (60) | |
