= Hovey (surname) =

Hovey is a surname. Notable people with the surname include:

- Alvin Peterson Hovey (1821–1891), American Civil War Union general, governor of Indiana and Indiana Supreme Court justice
- Ann Hovey (1911–2007), American chorus girl and film actress
- Anna Moncrieff Hovey (1902–1995), Canadian pianist and educator
- Ced Hovey (1918–2014), Australian rules footballer
- Charles Edward Hovey (1827–1897), educator, college president and general in the U.S. Army
- Charles Fox Hovey (1807–1859), businessman in Boston, Massachusetts
- Charles Mason Hovey (1810–1887), American nurseryman, seed merchant, journalist and author
- Charles Hovey (naval officer) (1885–1911), U.S. Navy officer
- Chester Ralph Hovey (1872–1953), Associate Justice of the Washington Supreme Court
- DebraLee Hovey (born 1954), American politician from Connecticut
- Edmund Otis Hovey (1862–1924), American geologist
- Edmund Otis Hovey (Wabash College) (1801–1877), American Presbyterian minister and college founder
- Elliot Hovey (born 1983), American Olympic rower
- Ethel May Hovey (1871–1953), British campaigner for women's education and maternity care
- Frederick Hovey (1868–1945), American tennis player
- George Rice Hovey (1860–1943), American university president, minister, professor and author
- Jay Hovey, American politician from Alabama
- Jim Hovey (1922–1995), Australian rules footballer
- Marcia Hovey-Wright (born 1946), American politician from Michigan
- Natasha Hovey (born 1967), Italian actress
- Nilo Hovey (1906–1986), American clarinetist
- Richard Hovey (1864–1900), American poet, songwriter and playwright
- Ron Hovey (1932–2015), Australian rules footballer
- Serge Hovey (1920–1989), American composer and ethnomusicologist
- Tim Hovey (1945–1989), American child actor and musician
- Wayne Hovey (born 1956), Australian rules footballer
- William Hovey (1786–1855), early American industrialist and inventor; builder in 1824 of the "Upper and Lower Mills" and of the Hovey Dam in North Grafton, MA, which dam supplied water to the nascent Blackstone Canal

== See also ==
- Justice Hovey (disambiguation)
