= Adam Richardson (Australian footballer) =

Australian rules footballer

Personal information
- Full name: Adam Scott Richardson
- Born: 20 August 1974 (age 52)
- Original team: Drysdale (BFL)
- Height: 194 cm (6 ft 4 in)
- Weight: 102 kg (16 st 1 lb; 225 lb)
- Position: Full-forward

Playing career^{1}
Years	Club	Games (Goals)
2001	Adelaide	2 (1)
- ^{1} Playing statistics correct to the end of 2001.

Career highlights
- SANFL debut with West Adelaide on 29 March 1997; West Adelaide Best & Fairest 1998; SANFL Ken Farmer Medallist 1998–2001; West Adelaide Leading Goal Kicker 1998–2001; AFL debut with Adelaide on 12 May 2001 v Fremantle at Football Park; West Adelaide Club Captain 2002; Bellarine Football League leading goalkicker 1995, 2003

Adam Scott Richardson (born 20 August 1974) is a former Australian rules footballer who played for West Adelaide in the South Australian National Football League (SANFL) and Adelaide in the Australian Football League (AFL).

Prior to moving to South Australia, Richardson played for Drysdale finishing runner up in the 1992 Bellarine Football League Grand Final whilst simultaneously playing TAC Cup Under 18's for the inaugural premiers, Geelong Falcons. Richardson returned to the Bellarine Football League, leading the goal kicking with 121 goals in 1995 whilst playing for Ocean Grove in their premiership side, before playing for Geelong's reserve team in 1996.

Richardson was a late comer to the AFL, recruited from West Adelaide in the 2001 Pre-Season Draft but only made two appearances. His first game came when Adelaide defeated Fremantle by 20 points at Football Park, with Richardson contributing an inaccurate one goal and four behinds. The following weekend he participated in a win over Richmond but had no disposals and four hitouts.

A full-forward, Richardson instead spent most of 2001 playing at West Adelaide and became only the second Wests player alongside the club's all-time leading goalkicker Roger Luders (105 in 1983) to kick 100 goals for the season, 85 of them in the home and away season. He won four consecutive Ken Farmer Medals from 1998 to 2001, being rewarded as the league's top goal-kicker, becoming the first ever West Adelaide player to win the award and just the third from the club to lead the league in goalkicking. Richardson also won the Best & Fairest award in 1998. Richardson captained West Adelaide in 2002.

Richardson returned to Victoria and finished his career at Drysdale as Player/Coach for two seasons 2003 & 2004. He was also the league's leading goalkicking with 110 goals in 2003.
