= Flynn Young =

Personal information
- Born: 3 February 2002 (age 24)
- Original team: Geelong Falcons/Barwon Heads/Grovedale/Newton & Chilwell/Werribee
- Draft: No. 4, 2025 mid-season rookie draft
- Debut: Round 16, 2025, Carlton vs. Port Adelaide, at Adelaide Oval
- Height: 181 cm (5 ft 11 in)
- Position: Forward

Playing career^{1}
Years	Club	Games (Goals)
2025–2026	Carlton	11 (7)
- ^{1} Playing statistics correct to the end of the 2026 season.

Career highlights
- VFL premiership player: 2024

Flynn Young (born 3 February 2002) is a former professional Australian rules footballer who played for the Carlton Football Club in the Australian Football League (AFL).

== Junior and VFL career ==
Young played for the Geelong Falcons in the Talent League. He averaged 10.5 disposals and 1.5 goals a game as a 19-year-old, also playing for Barwon Heads in the Bellarine Football League.

Young made the move to Grovedale in 2022, where he kicked 31 goals, playing one game for Werribee in the VFL too. In 2024, Young, following a move to the Newtown & Chilwell Football Club the year prior, kicked 21 goals over the course of four games, and earned a position in Werribee's line-up for the rest of the year, including their victorious VFL Grand Final appearance.

== AFL career ==
Young was selected by Carlton with pick 4 of the 2025 mid-season rookie draft. He made his debut against Port Adelaide in round 16 of the 2025 AFL season.

In October 2025, Young signed a one-year contract extension with Carlton to the end of 2026. He was delisted by Carlton at the end of the 2026 AFL season.

== Statistics ==
Updated to the end of the 2026 season.

Legend
G	Goals	K	Kicks	D	Disposals	T	Tackles
B	Behinds	H	Handballs	M	Marks

Season	Team	No.	Games	Totals							Averages (per game)							Votes
Season	Team	No.	Games	G	B	K	H	D	M	T	G	B	K	H	D	M	T	Votes
2025	Carlton	45	8	5	2	55	29	84	22	13	0.6	0.3	6.9	3.6	10.5	2.8	1.6	0
2026	Carlton	45	3	2	2	16	12	28	9	4	0.7	0.7	5.3	4.0	9.3	3.0	1.3	0
Career			11	7	4	71	41	112	31	17	0.6	0.4	6.5	3.7	10.2	2.8	1.5	0
