= Wayne Hovey =

Australian rules footballer

Personal information
- Full name: Wayne Hovey
- Born: 13 July 1956 (age 70)
- Original team: Shepparton United

Playing career^{1}
Years	Club	Games (Goals)
1977	Geelong	6 (10)
- ^{1} Playing statistics correct to the end of 1977.

Wayne Hovey (born 13 July 1956) is a former Australian rules footballer who played for Geelong in the Victorian Football League (now known as the Australian Football League).

He is the son of Jim Hovey, who played for Geelong in the 1940s. His uncles, Ced and Ron, were also Geelong footballers.
