= Oliver Wiltshire =

Australian rules footballer (born 2002)

Personal information
- Born: 15 September 2002 (age 24)
- Original team: Barwon Heads
- Draft: No. 61, 2023 national draft
- Height: 180 cm (5 ft 11 in)
- Weight: 67 kg (148 lb)
- Position: Forward

Club information
- Current club: Geelong
- Number: 21

Playing career
Years	Club	Games (Goals)
2025–	Geelong	18 (15)

Oliver Wiltshire (born 15 September 2002) is an Australian rules footballer who plays for Geelong in the Australian Football League (AFL).

Wiltshire comes from Barwon Heads and was educated at St Joseph's College, Geelong. He came through the juniors of the Barton Heads Seagulls. In addition to football, Wiltshire was also a competitive middle-distance runner growing up, securing top 10 finishes at the state championships for both the 800m and 1500m events.

A forward, Wiltshire played his early senior football in the Bellarine Football League with Barton Heads, while training as an apprentice carpenter. He amassed 51 goals from 18 appearances in 2023, notably kicking 12 goals against Modewarre early in the season.

Wiltshire was selected by Geelong with the 61st pick of the 2023 national draft. He struggled with osteitis pubis during his first year, before featuring twice in the 2025 AFL season, debuting against Carlton in round seven. In the 2026 season, Wiltshire featured regularly for Geelong with 16 appearances, and had a team high four goal assists in their elimination final win over Carlton.
