= Jasper Pittard =

Australian rules footballer

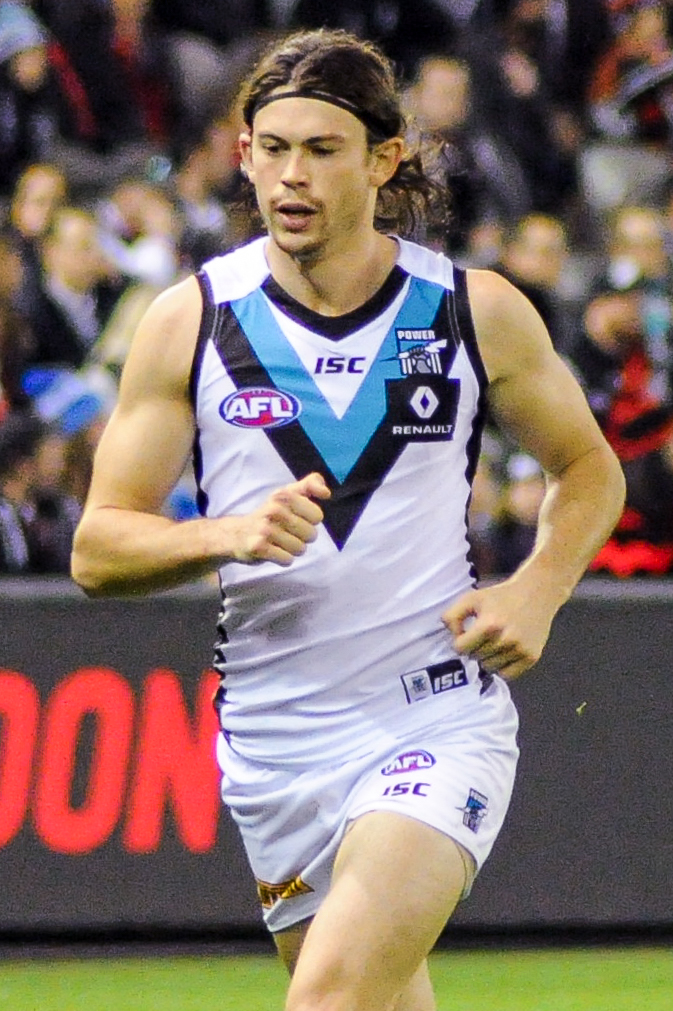
- Pittard in 2017

Personal information
- Full name: Jasper Pittard
- Born: 1 April 1991 (age 35); Melbourne, Victoria
- Original team: Geelong Falcons (TAC Cup)/Torquay
- Draft: No. 16, 2009 National Draft, Port Adelaide
- Height: 186 cm (6 ft 1 in)
- Weight: 83 kg (183 lb)
- Position: Defender

Playing career^{1}
Years	Club	Games (Goals)
2011–2018	Port Adelaide	126 (11)
2019–2020	North Melbourne	31 (5)
Total		157 (16)
- ^{1} Playing statistics correct to the end of 2020.

Career highlights
- 2011 AFL Rising Star nominee; Fos Williams Medal 2016; Coaches Award 2016

Jasper Pittard (born Jasper McMillan-Pittard, 1 April 1991) is a former Australian rules footballer who played for the North Melbourne Football Club and the Port Adelaide Football Club in the Australian Football League (AFL). He was one of three Port Adelaide players drafted in the first round in the 2009 AFL draft.

Along with former teammate Tom Campbell, Pittard notably launched ‘Footy for Climate’ in 2021, an organisation of AFL players supportive of greater action on climate change.

== Playing career ==
A Vic Country U18 representative in 2009, he scored 10.40 mins for the 3 km at Draft Camp, but was unable to do speed work as he was recovering from injury. He was rated by the AFL clubs as the best interviewee at the camp. He averaged 18 disposals in 13 matches for the Falcons with an efficiency rate of 71 per cent. He also played senior football for Torquay Football Club in the Bellarine Football League in 2008.

=== Port Adelaide (2011–2018) ===
In early 2010, Pittard decided to shorten his surname by dropping "McMillan" for simplicity.

Pittard debuted for the Power in the opening round of the 2010 NAB Cup alongside seven other rookie players. Although he didn't stand out as much as some of the other debutantes, he contributed with three kicks and three handballs.

After a 25-possession match against Adelaide in round 4, he was nominated for the 2011 AFL Rising Star award.

Pittard played all 25 games in 2014 and was the team's designated kicker from the kick ins. He managed to eradicate many of the fundamental errors which had previously characterised his game. His finals series was very solid, proving his ability to perform under pressure. Pittard put together another solid year in 2015, playing 20 games.

Pittard was traded, along with teammate Jared Polec, to North Melbourne at the conclusion of the 2018 season.

=== North Melbourne (2019–2020) ===
Pittard played all 22 games in 2019 and finished 9th in North Melbourne's Best and Fairest for the season.

After playing the first 11 games of 2020, Pittard was dropped from the side along with several other teammates due to the team's poor start to the season. Pittard did not play another game for the club and was delisted at the end of the year, after mass delistings which saw 11 players cut from the team's list.
