= Barwon Heads Football Netball Club =

Barwon Heads

Names
- Full name: Barwon Heads Football Netball Club
- Nickname: Seagulls

Club details
- Founded: 1922; 104 years ago
- Colours
- Competition: Bellarine Football League
- Ground: Howard Harmer Oval, Barwon Heads

Uniforms
Home

Other information
- Official website: barwonheadsfnc.org.au

The Barwon Heads Football Netball Club is an Australian rules football and netball club that plays in the Bellarine Football League and situated in the township of Barwon Heads, near the city of Geelong in Victoria. The club plays its home games at Howard Harmer Oval of Barwon Heads, and wears a light blue and royal blue jumper with a seagull motif.

== History ==
A "Barwon Heads F.C." existed circa 1922 which wore maroon jumpers with a white diagonal sash and were also known as the Seagulls. At some time in the early 1940s it was acknowledged that the club’s colours clashed with too many other clubs in the Geelong region and so the club decided to adopt completely new colours. A brand new set of royal blue jumpers with white collar and cuffs were purchased at great expense to the club. After their first game the jumpers were washed and the blue die ran and stained the white trim pale blue. Since the club could not afford the cost of a new set, the colours were changed to royal and pale blue. The club between 1947–1969 was known as "The Barwon Heads/Ocean Grove Football Club" which represented the greater Barwon Heads/Ocean Grove

Eventually in 1964 a new entity the Ocean Grove Football Club was formed and competed in the G.D.F.L. Jarman Cup. The Ocean Grove Football Club and the Barwon Heads/Ocean Grove Football Club played in the G.D.F.L. Woolworths Cup as opponents from 1965 to 1969. Ocean Grove adopted a purple and gold guernsey (later adopting the current red and white) however "Barwon Heads" kept the royal blue with white seagull centered.

The Barwon Heads/Ocean Grove F.C. dropped Ocean Grove from its name in 1970. The Barwon Heads FC was a founding member of the Bellarine Football League. The club held meetings from 1968 with neighbouring towns and the Victorian Country Football League to initiate a competition.

During the 1960s Barwon Heads had success at junior level with many players during this era coming from families who made the Heads and Grove their home after World War 2 mostly around 1949; namely Melnyk, Piec and Zurawel whose sons later played for the club in the 1990s. The juniors during this period were conveyed to venues in the back of an old truck in the early frosty mornings before car pooling came into vogue. It's worth noting that although Barwon Heads and Ocean Grove matches are known to be the "Battle of the Bridge". The history and foundations of the two clubs were cemented by the local families from the area as mentioned including Watson, Johnson and Robinsons to name a few with recent input from past AFL players Michael Turner (Geelong) and well respected Seagull Geoff 'Joffa' Miles (Former Collingwood, West Coast and Geelong) who has been a club Player, President, Coach, Trainer and Junior Co-Ordinator.

== Premierships ==
=== Senior ===
- Bellarine Football League (6): 1972, 1973, 1974, 1993, 2019, 2022
- Geelong & District Football League (1): 1957
- AFL Barwon Women's Football (1): 2018 (Division 2)

=== Minor ===
- Reserve (2): 1987, 1993
- U/18's (2) in 2005, 2017

== Individual honours ==
- Steven 'Chooka' Piec was the Leagues leading goalkicker with 90 (1972), 77 (1973), 57 (1974), 68 (1976)
- Lucas Murphy kicked (102) in 2008, (92) in 2009
- League Best & Fairest (Ash Medal) 1973, 1975; Dennis Johnson, 1992; Matt Walter 1994; Geoff Taylor 2002; Mark Hilderandt 2018; Matt Dyer

== Notable VFL/AFL players ==
- Geoff Ainsworth with Geelong
- Leo O'Halloran with Geelong and South Melbourne
- Darryl Stephens with Geelong
- Matt Maguire with St Kilda and Brisbane Lions
- Tim Callan with Geelong and Western Bulldogs
- Jaxson Barham with Collingwood
- Teia Miles with Hawthorn
- Alex Witherdon with Brisbane Lions and West Coast
- Ned McHenry with Adelaide
- Brandon Ryan with Hawthorn and Brisbane Lions
- Oliver Wiltshire with Geelong
- Flynn Young with Carlton
- Joe Pike with Geelong

== Bibliography ==
- Cat Country: History of Football in the Geelong Region by John Stoward – Aussie Footy Books, 2008 – ISBN 9780957751583
