= Ed Curnow =

Australian rules footballer (born 1989)

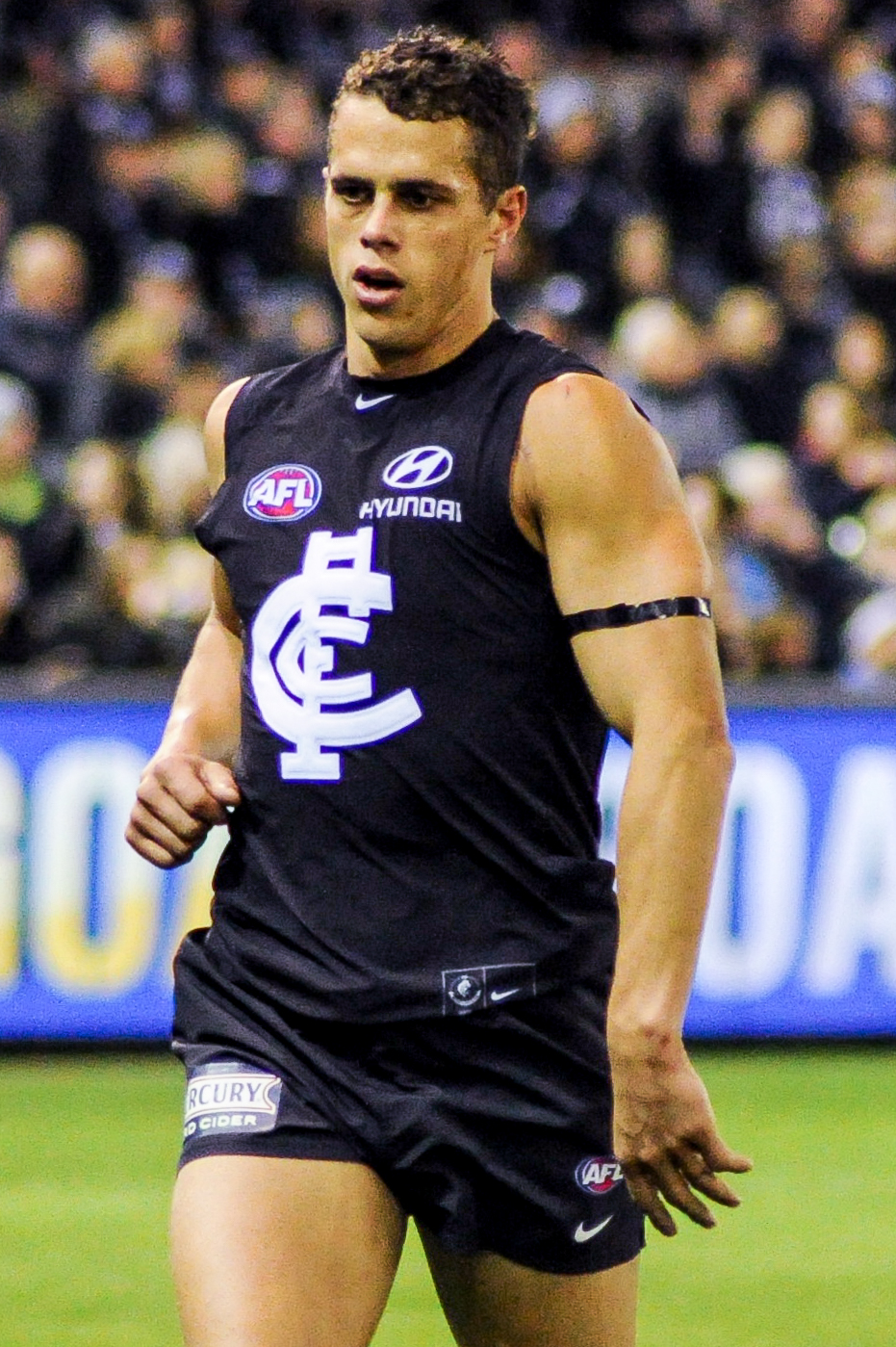
- Curnow playing for Carlton in June 2017

Personal information
- Full name: Edward Curnow
- Born: 7 November 1989 (age 36)
- Original team: Geelong Falcons (TAC Cup)
- Draft: No. 40, 2008 Rookie Draft, Adelaide; No. 18, 2011 Rookie Draft, Carlton
- Height: 180 cm (5 ft 11 in)
- Weight: 86 kg (190 lb)
- Position: Midfielder

Club information
- Current club: Carlton
- Number: 35

Playing career^{1}
Years	Club	Games (Goals)
2008	Adelaide	0 (0)
2011–2023	Carlton	221 (53)
- ^{1} Playing statistics correct to the end of round 24, 2023.

Career highlights
- David Parkin Medal: 2021; AFLPA Education and Training Excellence Award: 2017

Edward Curnow (born 7 November 1989) is a former professional Australian rules footballer who played for the Adelaide Football Club and Carlton Football Club in the Australian Football League (AFL).

== Early life ==
Curnow participated in the Auskick program at Geelong in Victoria, Australia, and played his junior football for Modewarre in the Bellarine Football League and school football for The Geelong College in the APS, before playing TAC Cup football for the Geelong Falcons until 2007, also representing Vic Country in the AFL Under-18 Championships. He was drafted to the AFL by the Adelaide Football Club with its third selection in the 2008 AFL Rookie Draft (#40 overall); however, he did not play a senior game for the Crows. He spent the 2008 season playing with Glenelg, his allocated SANFL club, and was delisted by the Crows after one season.

== AFL career ==
Curnow returned to Victoria, and signed up with Box Hill in the VFL in 2009. Curnow's 2009 season was solid, but his 2010 season was exceptional, and he was consistently Box Hill's best player. His season was cut short when he broke his leg in Round 13, missing the Hawks' last eight games; nevertheless, he had already polled enough votes to win the Box Hill best and fairest (the Col Austen Trophy), and he finished third in the J. J. Liston Trophy, after holding a comfortable lead at the time of his injury. Curnow played a total of 33 senior games for Box Hill during his two years at the club, and also played one representative game for the VFL.

Following his successful VFL season, Curnow was recruited back to the AFL by the Carlton Football Club with its first selection in the 2011 AFL Rookie Draft (No. 18 overall). He was given guernsey number 35. After impressing in the pre-season, Curnow became the club's nominated rookie, and he made his debut for the Blues in Round 1 of the 2011 season against Richmond at the MCG. He made a bright start to his career as one of Carlton's best players in the first six matches of the season, although the rest of his season suffered after a shoulder injury in Round 7.

Over the following years, and particularly under the coaching of Mick Malthouse between 2013 and mid-2015, Curnow made a name as a reliable tagger. Champion Data rated him to be the second best tagger in the league in 2013, and he finished fourth in the club's best and fairest that year, as well as in 2015.

Once Curnow was well established as a big-bodied and hard-running midfielder – he regularly won the club's 2km time trial – his roles as a ball-winner and began to diversify, especially after Malthouse's departure from the club; and after being elevated to the club's leadership group, he had a break-out year as a two-way tagger in 2016, increasing his attacking output as well as continuing to be a dependable tagger. Curnow was a mainstay of Carlton's midfield over the following years, finishing second in the club best and fairest in 2019, and third in 2018 and 2020.

Curnow missed the entire 2022 season with injuries, before returning to the rookie list for his final season in 2023. After thirteen seasons with Carlton, Curnow retired at the end of 2023. A popular figure at the club, Curnow was a three-time Best Clubman Award winner (2011, 2016 and 2019) and was in the club's leadership group between 2016 and 2020.

== Personal life ==
Curnow is the older brother of footballer and three time Coleman Medallist Charlie Curnow, and the two played alongside each other at Carlton for eight years between 2016 and 2023.

Curnow possesses a Bachelor of Environmental Engineering and a Master of Project Management, and was studying a Master of Finance at the University of Melbourne in 2020.

== Statistics ==
Statistics are correct to the end of the 2021 season

Legend
G	Goals	K	Kicks	D	Disposals	T	Tackles
B	Behinds	H	Handballs	M	Marks

Season	Team	No.	Games	Totals							Averages (per game)							Votes
Season	Team	No.	Games	G	B	K	H	D	M	T	G	B	K	H	D	M	T	Votes
2011	Carlton	35	12	3	1	117	98	215	47	55	0.3	0.1	9.8	8.2	17.9	3.9	4.6	0
2012	Carlton	35	18	0	2	128	190	318	58	89	0.0	0.1	7.1	10.6	17.7	3.2	4.9	0
2013	Carlton	35	21	6	3	182	165	347	72	99	0.3	0.1	8.7	7.9	16.5	3.4	4.7	0
2014	Carlton	35	15	2	3	163	156	319	60	74	0.1	0.2	10.9	10.4	21.3	4.0	4.9	0
2015	Carlton	35	22	0	3	216	262	478	75	98	0.0	0.1	9.8	11.9	21.7	3.4	4.5	0
2016	Carlton	35	21	5	9	275	249	524	76	147	0.2	0.4	13.1	11.9	25.0	3.6	7.0	3
2017	Carlton	35	13	6	3	156	126	282	51	66	0.5	0.2	12.0	9.7	21.7	3.9	5.1	0
2018	Carlton	35	21	5	6	266	268	534	81	138	0.2	0.3	12.7	12.8	25.4	3.9	6.6	4
2019	Carlton	35	22	9	8	267	229	496	84	112	0.4	0.4	12.1	10.4	22.5	3.8	5.1	5
2020	Carlton	35	17	4	3	212	108	320	42	89	0.2	0.2	12.5	6.4	18.8	2.5	5.2	5
2021	Carlton	35	22	10	3	318	178	496	106	80	0.5	0.1	14.5	8.1	22.5	4.8	3.6	4
Career			204	50	44	2300	2029	4329	752	1046	0.2	0.2	11.2	9.9	21.2	3.6	5.1	21
