= Lindsay Smith (Australian footballer) =

Australian rules footballer (born 1980)

Personal information
- Full name: Lindsay Gordan Smith
- Born: 29 February 1980 (age 46); Renmark, South Australia
- Original team: Bordertown / Glenelg
- Height: 199 cm (6 ft 6 in)
- Weight: 81 kg (179 lb)
- Position: Ruck

Club information
- Current club: Retired
- Number: Kangaroos - 38; Carlton - 11

Playing career^{1}
Years	Club	Games (Goals)
2001	Kangaroos	1 (1)
2002	Carlton	3 (0)
Total		4 (1)
- ^{1} Playing statistics correct to the end of 2002.

Lindsay Smith (born 29 February 1980) is a former Australian rules footballer who played with Kangaroos and Carlton in the Australian Football League.

A tall, key position/ruckman, originally from Bordertown in the Kowree-Naracoorte-Tatiara Football League. He was originally recruited to the SANFL by Glenelg Football Club, and from there was recruited to the Australian Football League by the North Melbourne Football Club in the 1999 National Draft, with a fifth round draft pick (No. 77 overall). Smith spent two years on the North Melbourne playing list, but managed only one senior game, in Round 8, 2001 against St Kilda. After the 2001 season, Smith was traded to the Carlton Football Club in exchange for a fifth round draft pick (No. 61 overall). He played three games in one season for Carlton before being delisted.

Smith returned to play one season for Bordertown in 2003, where he won the KNTFL League Best and Fairest. From 2004 until 2011, Smith played for Geelong Amateur in the Bellarine Football League. He was regularly one of the league's top players, and won the League Best and Fairest in 2009. Smith was named as first ruck in the Geelong Amateur Team of the Decade, and won two premierships with the club. He retired from playing after the 2011 season, at age 31.

== Sources ==
- Holmesby, Russell & Main, Jim (2009). The Encyclopedia of AFL Footballers. 8th ed. Melbourne: Bas Publishing.
- Lindsay Smith's playing statistics from AFL Tables
- Lindsay Smith's profile at Blueseum
