= Hovey =

Hovey may refer to:

== People ==
- Hovey (surname), a list of people
- Hovey E. Copley (1869–1946), American politician
- Hovey Everett (died 1861), owner of Dr. Hovey Everett House, Chemung, New York, United States

== Geography ==
- Hovey, Indiana, United States, an unincorporated community
- Hovey Township, Armstrong County, Pennsylvania, United States
- Hovey Lake, a body of water near Mount Vernon, Indiana, United States - see Hovey Lake Fish and Wildlife Area
- Hovey Channel, a feature of the Permian Basin (North America)

== Military uses ==
- Camp Hovey, a United States Army military base in Dongducheon, Gyeonggi Province, South Korea
- Fort Hovey (Fort Curtis), an American Civil War fort in Missouri
- USS Hovey, a World War II United States Navy destroyer

== Other uses ==
- Hovey Field, a stadium in Richmond, Virginia, United States

== See also ==
- SS Richard Hovey, a merchant ship sunk by Japanese submarine I-26 during World War II
