= Brian O'Keefe =

Brian O'Keefe may refer to:

- Brian O'Keefe (footballer) (born 1956), Australian rules footballer
- Brian O'Keefe (baseball) (born 1993), American baseball catcher

== See also ==
- Brian O'Keeffe (born 1977), Irish hurler
