= Ian Lewtas =

Australian rules footballer

Personal information
- Full name: Ian Lewtas
- Born: 25 February 1954 (age 72)
- Original team: Anglesea

Playing career^{1}
Years	Club	Games (Goals)
1973 — 1976	Geelong	15 (4)
- ^{1} Playing statistics correct to the end of 1976.

Ian Lewtas (born 25 February 1954) is an Australian rules footballer who played for the Geelong in the Australian Football League (AFL).
