= Edmund Otis Hovey =

American geologist (1862–1924)

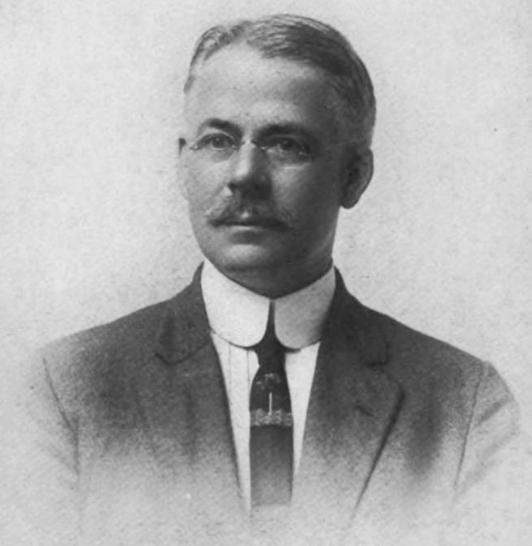
- Born: September 15, 1862; New Haven, Connecticut, US
- Died: September 27, 1924 (aged 62); New York City, US
- Education: Yale University
- Scientific career
- Fields: Geology
- Workplaces: American Museum of Natural History
- Doctoral advisor: James Dwight Dana; Samuel Lewis Penfield

Signature
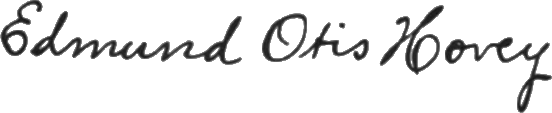

Edmund Otis Hovey (September 15, 1862 – September 27, 1924) was an American geologist specialising in volcanoes, earthquakes and meteorites. He made his greatest impact as curator of geology at the American Museum of Natural History.

== Early life and career ==
Hovey was born in New Haven, Connecticut, and he began studying geology through the amateur interests of his father — the Rev. Horace Carter Hovey, a Presbyterian minister. The family travelled throughout Hovey's teens exposing him to a range of landscapes across the United States. He first studied at Yale University before becoming a school teacher. For the next few years he managed both teaching and postgraduate study, gaining his doctorate under James Dwight Dana in 1889. He was appointed assistant curator at the American Museum of Natural History in 1894, after organising a successful mineralogical exhibition at the Columbian Exposition in Chicago. He was promoted to associate curator in 1901, and eventually became Curator of Geology and invertebrate paleontology in 1910.

== Fieldwork and expeditions ==
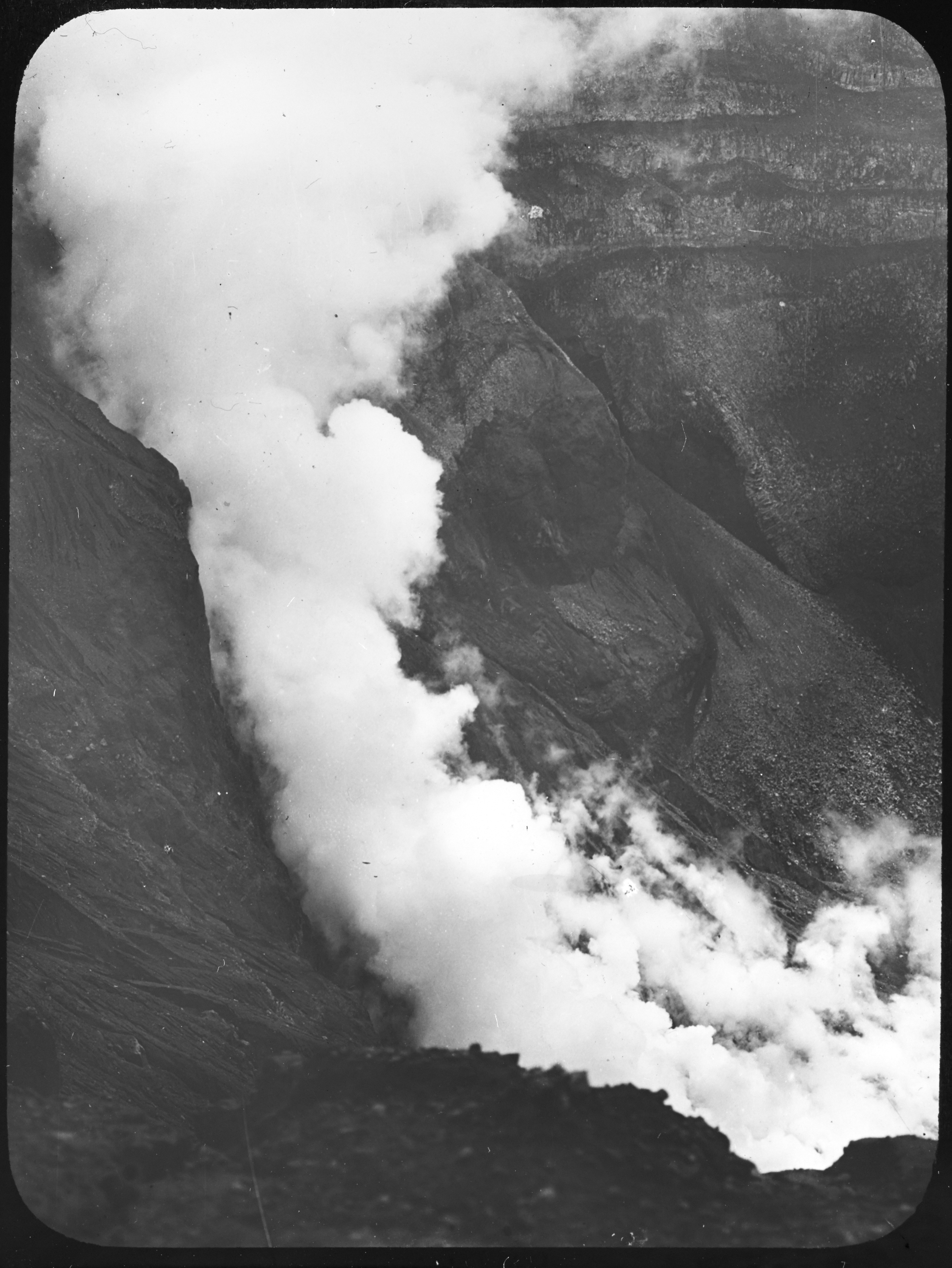
Steam column rising from south-east part of La Soufriere, St Vincent

Hovey travelled extensively to study geological phenomena and was often accompanied by his wife, Esther Lancraft, who would write up the more prosaic aspects of their travels.

One of his most significant voyages was to study the aftermath of the Mount Pelee and La Soufriere eruptions in 1902. Hovey travelled to the Caribbean in the immediate aftermath of the eruptions, on the USS Dixie. The party included geologists Thomas Jaggar, Israel Russell, Angelo Heilprin and Robert T. Hill, geographer George Carroll Curtis and Norwegian explorer Carsten Borchgrevink. In the Caribbean, Hovey also met up with British photographer and volcanophile, Tempest Anderson.

Many of Hovey's notebooks, photographs and published papers are archived at the American Museum of Natural History.

Hovey's fieldwork and expeditions
| Year | Destinations | Example photograph |
|---|---|---|
| 1897 | Italy Mount Vesuvius | |
| 1902 | Martinique and Saint Vincent | Dust covered ridge of Bunkers Hill, Richmond estate |
| 1905 | Mexico | |
| 1906 | 1906 San Francisco earthquake | |
| Around 1905 | Willamette Meteorite | |
| 1915-16 | Greenland | |

== Family ==
Hovey married Esther Amanda Lancraft in September 1888; she died in 1914. Hovey later married Dell Geneva Rogers, in 1919. Hovey died at Roosevelt Hospital in New York on September 27, 1924.
