= Connor Idun =

Australian rules footballer (born 2000)

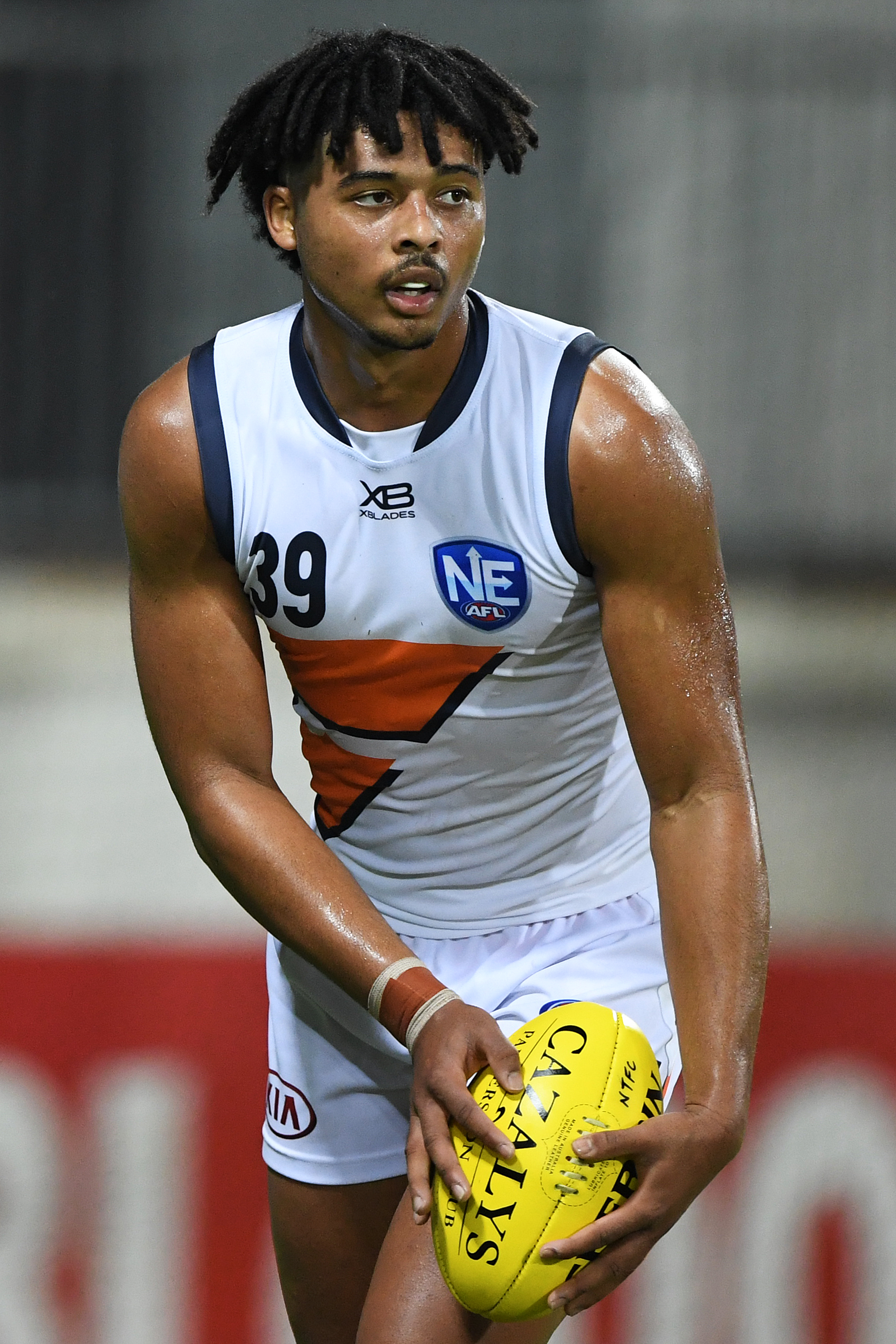
- Idun playing for Greater Western Sydney in July 2019

Personal information
- Full name: Connor Joshua Kwamena Idun
- Nicknames: Seek, CEO
- Born: 29 July 2000 (age 26); London, England, United Kingdom
- Original teams: Drysdale Football Club; Geelong Falcons
- Draft: No. 61 in the 2018 national draft
- Debut: 3 August 2019, Greater Western Sydney vs. Sydney, at Sydney Showground
- Height: 191 cm (6 ft 3 in)
- Weight: 91 kg (201 lb)
- Position: Defender

Club information
- Current club: Greater Western Sydney
- Number: 39

Playing career^{1}
Years	Club	Games (Goals)
2019–	Greater Western Sydney	140 (0)
- ^{1} Playing statistics correct to the end of 2026.

Connor Joshua Kwamena Idun (born 29 July 2000) is an Australian rules footballer who plays for the Greater Western Sydney Giants in the Australian Football League (AFL).

== Early life ==
Connor Idun was born in London to an Australian mother and a father from Ghana and was raised in Essex to the age of 4.

As a child he moved with his family from London to Sydney before relocating to Geelong in Victoria.

He began playing Australian rules football at the age of 12 in Geelong for Drysdale Football Club juniors and completed his VCE at Christian College. He played two seasons of NAB League for the Geelong Falcons primarily in defence before being selected to represent Victoria Country at the 2018 NAB AFL U18 Championships.

== AFL career ==
Idun was selected by the Greater Western Sydney Giants at pick No. 61 in the 2018 AFL national draft. He made his senior debut against Sydney in round 20 of the 2019 season, as a late replacement for injured forward Jeremy Cameron. He only managed three games across his first two years before being selected in round one, 2021 and going on to play 21 out of a possible 22 games, averaging 5.4 marks and 12.6 disposals per game. He was named the NAB AFL Rising Star nomination for round 23 of the 2021 season.

== Statistics ==
Updated to the end of round 22, 2026.

Legend
G	Goals	K	Kicks	D	Disposals	T	Tackles
B	Behinds	H	Handballs	M	Marks

Season	Team	No.	Games	Totals							Averages (per game)							Votes
Season	Team	No.	Games	G	B	K	H	D	M	T	G	B	K	H	D	M	T	Votes
2019	Greater Western Sydney	39	1	0	0	5	3	8	3	2	0.0	0.0	5.0	3.0	8.0	3.0	2.0	0
2020 (Note: The 2020 season was played with 17 home-and-away matches per team (down from 22) and 16-minute quarters with time on (down from 20-minute quarters with time on) due to the impact of the COVID-19 pandemic.)	Greater Western Sydney	39	2	0	0	9	8	17	5	1	0.0	0.0	4.5	4.0	8.5	2.5	0.5	0
2021	Greater Western Sydney	39	23	0	0	173	113	286	124	41	0.0	0.0	7.5	4.9	12.4	5.4	1.8	0
2022	Greater Western Sydney	39	16	0	3	124	96	220	74	27	0.0	0.2	7.8	6.0	13.8	4.6	1.7	0
2023	Greater Western Sydney	39	26	0	0	225	220	445	142	48	0.0	0.0	8.7	8.5	17.1	5.5	1.8	1
2024	Greater Western Sydney	39	25	0	1	226	252	478	170	36	0.0	0.0	9.0	10.1	19.1	6.8	1.4	0
2025	Greater Western Sydney	39	24	0	0	239	198	437	162	34	0.0	0.0	10.0	8.3	18.2	6.8	1.4	0
2026	Greater Western Sydney	39	21	0	0	239	196	435	136	34	0.0	0.0	11.4	9.3	20.7	6.5	1.6	0
Career			138	0	4	1240	1086	2326	816	223	0.0	0.0	9.0	7.9	16.9	5.9	1.6	1
