= Surf Coast Suns =

Names
- Full name: Surfcoast Suns Football & Netball Club Inc.
- Nickname: Suns
- Club song: "We are the Suns of the Surf Coast sky"

Club details
- Founded: 2016; 9 years ago
- Colours
- Competition: Bellarine Football Netball League
- President: Jay Williams (Football)
- Premierships: BFL (0)
- Ground: Polwarth Oval, Grenville Oval

Other information
- Official website: surfcoastsuns.com

The Surf Coast Football Netball Club, nicknamed the Suns, is an Australian rules football and netball club based in northern Torquay in the Surf Coast Shire of Victoria, Australia.

After a 9 year stint as a junior-only club, Surf Coast's senior team will debut in the Bellarine Football Netball League in the 2026 season. The Suns play their home games at the Polwarth Oval and Grenville Oval, which are based at the Banyul-Warri Fields Sporting Precinct.

== History ==
Following the consistent growth of northern Torquay throughout the 2010s, it was decided that a new volunteer-led junior football club would join the AFL Barwon junior competition in 2016. The first Surf Coast teams successfully joined the competition that season, and after just one year the club was able to enter junior Netball teams as well.

The club remained successful with many premierships being won between the U14 and U16 age groups throughout the following years. In 2024, the club made the decision to apply for a senior side in the Bellarine FNL and were successful.
