= Newcomb Power Football Club =

Australian rules football and netball club

Newcomb Power

Names
- Full name: Newcomb Power Football Netball Club
- Nickname(s): Power

Club details
- Founded: 1975; 50 years ago
- Colours
- Competition: Bellarine Football League
- Premierships: 6 (1980, 1981, 1982, 1988, 2005, 2007)
- Ground(s): Grinter Reserve

Uniforms
Home

Other information
- Official website: newcombpowerfnc.com.au

The Newcomb Power Football Netball Club is an Australian rules football and netball club based in the suburb of Moolap, Victoria. The teams currently play in the Bellarine Football League.

Newcomb Power's home ground is Grinter Reserve, Moolap.

== History ==
The club was established in 1975 as "Newcomb Football Club" until 2000 when a name change it became the "Newcomb Power Football Club". Originally nicknamed the Dinosaurs, the club is now known as the Power.

Originally the club wore a maroon guernsey with light blue yolk and distinctive light blue shorts with maroon stripes. A dinosaur badge with yellow 'stegasauraus' was worn left of the jumper, the badge also adorned the caps of the Newcomb and District Cricket Club. The football club officially came under the banner of Newcomb and District Sports Club however as the club lost its lacrosse, baseball and tennis clubs to name a few and today the Power are known as Newcomb Football Club.

Newcomb have won (1) Reserves Premiership being 1980, (8) U/18's Flags 1978, 81–84, 86, 90-91 four being as Champions (undefeated) and Grand Finalists in 2015, U/15's won (5) Flags 1978–80, 82, 84 four as Champions.

== Premierships ==
=== Senior ===
- Bellarine Football League (6): 1980, 1981, 1982, 1988, 2005, 2007

=== Reserves ===
- Bellarine Football League (1): 1980

=== Colts ===
- Bellarine Football League (8): 1978, 1981 (Under 17s); 1982, 1983, 1984, 1986, 1990, 1991 (Under 18s)

=== Junior ===
- Bellarine Football League (5): 1978, 1979 (Under 14s); 1980, 1982, 1984 (Under 15s)

== Individual honours ==
- BFL Senior Best and Fairest (Les Ash Medal):
  - 1981 – John Fagan
  - 1996 – Paul Hudson
  - 1997 – Paul Hudson
  - 2007 – Ricky O'Toole
- BFL Reserves Best and Fairest (Don Cole Medal):
  - 1979 – David Wilson
  - 1981 – Alan McKee
  - 1982 – Terry Bellears
  - 1991 – Chris Nicholls
  - 1998 – Craig Pearce
  - 1999 – Stephen Ward
  - 2001 – Craig Pearce
- Senior Leading Goalkicker:
  - 1979 — Tony Sudale (85)
  - 1981 — Tony Sudale (77)
- Reserves Leading Goalkicker:
  - 1979 – Steven Turner (97)
  - 1980 – Steven Turner (74)
  - 1981 – Des Harris (47)
  - 1999 – Paul Vigilante (69)

== Notable VFL/AFL players ==
- David O'Keeffe with Geelong and Brisbane Bears
