= Modewarre Football and Netball Club =

Modewarre

Names
- Full name: Modewarre Football and Netball Club
- Nickname: Warriors

Club details
- Founded: 1879; 147 years ago
- Colours
- Competition: Bellarine Football League
- Chairperson: Paul Grossman
- Ground: Mt Moriac Reserve

Uniforms
Home

Other information
- Official website: mfnc.com.au

The Modewarre Football and Netball Club, nicknamed the Warriors, is an Australian rules football and netball club situated near the rural town of Moriac, Victoria. Modewarre teams currently compete in the Bellarine Football League.

The club, established in 1878, plays its home games at the Mount Moriac Recreation Reserve, Mount Moriac.

== Premierships ==
- Geelong & District Football League (11): 1931, 1938, 1952, 1954, 1960, 1973, 1974, 1976, 1979, 1989, 1994
- Bellarine Football League (1): 2018
- AFL Barwon Female Football (1): 2023 (Division 3)

== Notable VFL/AFL players ==
- Gary Ablett, Jr. with Geelong and Gold Coast
- Nathan Ablett with Geelong and Gold Coast
- Ed Curnow with Carlton
- Ced Hovey with Geelong
- Jim Hovey with Geelong
- Ron Hovey with Geelong
- John Meesen with Adelaide and Melbourne
- Wayne Carroll Greater Western Sydney

== Bibliography ==
- Cat Country: History of Football in the Geelong Region by John Stoward – Aussie Footy Books, 2008 – ISBN 9780957751583
