= Leo O'Halloran =

Australian rules footballer

Personal information
- Full name: Leo Denis O'Halloran
- Born: 11 June 1925; Colac, Victoria
- Died: 27 October 1990 (aged 65); Geelong, Victoria
- Original team: Barwon Heads
- Height: 189 cm (6 ft 2 in)
- Weight: 83 kg (183 lb)

Playing career^{1}
Years	Club	Games (Goals)
1949–1952	Geelong	20 (19)
1953	South Melbourne	9 (11)
Total		29 (30)
- ^{1} Playing statistics correct to the end of 1953.

Leo Denis O'Halloran (11 June 1925 – 27 October 1990) was an Australian rules footballer who played with Geelong and South Melbourne in the Victorian Football League (VFL).

A follower and forward, O'Halloran was already 24 when he started his league career, having come to Geelong from Barwon Heads. While he was at the club in 1951 and 1952, Geelong won back to back premierships, but O'Halloran never featured in a single final. He struggled with injuries and the most he played in a season for Geelong was seven games in 1951. His performances for the Geelong seconds in 1952 won him a Gardiner Medal.

He spent the 1953 VFL season at South Melbourne, playing as a rover.
