= Russell Renfrey =

Australian rules footballer (1923–2018)

Personal information
- Born: 11 August 1923; Geelong, Victoria
- Died: 28 April 2018 (aged 94); Point Lonsdale, Victoria
- Original team: Drysdale
- Height: 183 cm (6 ft 0 in)
- Weight: 92 kg (203 lb)

Playing career^{1}
Years	Club	Games (Goals)
1946–1956	Geelong	201 (165)
- ^{1} Playing statistics correct to the end of 1956.

Russell 'Hooker' Renfrey (11 August 1923 – 28 April 2018) was an Australian rules footballer who played for Geelong in the VFL.

His career spanned from 1946 to 1956, during which he played 202 games for Geelong. At 182 cm and 83.5 kg, he was an important team member of that era, playing ruck rover in a team that boasted many prominent players.

Renfrey joined Geelong in 1946 with his only football experience in matches played during his stint in the Army. He was selected immediately in the Geelong Senior team and never played in the second eighteen, although was the 19th man in his 152nd match. He was the leading goal kicker for Geelong in his debut year (1946) with 38 goals. Renfrey represented Victoria in the interstate football during the 1948 season. He was a vital member of the Geelong side which won back to back premierships in 1951 and 1952. Over the 1952 and 1953 seasons Renfrey was the only player to play in all 26 wins without loss that is a record that stands to date.

He died on 28 April 2018 at the age of 94.
