= Graeme Linke =

Australian rules footballer

Personal information
- Full name: Graeme D. Linke
- Born: 17 November 1951 (age 74)
- Original team: Hawkesdale
- Height: 187 cm (6 ft 2 in)
- Weight: 92 kg (203 lb)

Playing career^{1}
Years	Club	Games (Goals)
1971–1974	Geelong	38 (0)
1975–1976	Woodville	
1977–1978	Footscray	5 (0)
- ^{1} Playing statistics correct to the end of 1978.

Graeme Linke (born November 17, 1951) is a former Australian rules footballer who played with Geelong and Footscray in the Victorian Football League (VFL) as well as Woodville in the South Australian National Football League (SANFL).

Linke, a defender often used at full-back, came to Geelong from Hawkesdale. He played 38 senior games for Geelong in four seasons, then went to Woodville for two years, before returning to Victoria and signing with Footscray. His career at Footscray was short, with one game in 1977 and four in 1978. He then played for Geelong Amateur in the Victorian Amateur Football Association and won the C-Grade competition's best and fairest award in 1979. His brother, Peter, also played for Geelong.
