= Justice Hovey =

Justice Hovey may refer to:

- Alvin Peterson Hovey, associate justice of the Supreme Court of Indiana
- Chester Ralph Hovey, associate justice of the Washington Supreme Court
