= Anglesea Football Netball Club =

Anglesea

Names
- Full name: Anglesea Football Netball Club
- Nickname: Roos

Club details
- Founded: 1963; 63 years ago
- Colours
- Competition: Bellarine Football League
- Premierships: 4, (1983, 1991, 1999, 2025)
- Ground: Dave Harding Oval, Anglesea

Uniforms
Home

Other information
- Official website: angleseafnc.com.au

The Anglesea Football Netball Club is an Australian rules football and netball club situated in the township of Anglesea, near the city of Geelong in Victoria.

The club plays its home games at Ellimatta Oval, Anglesea, and competes in the Bellarine Football League, an Australian rules competition established in 1971 in the Bellarine Peninsula region of Victoria.

== History ==
Anglesea Football Club was established in 1963. It is now known as the "Kangaroos". Before the founding of the club local players from Anglesea played for Freshwater Creek.

The Anglesea Football Club played the 1963 and 1964 season for the Geelong & District Football League Jarman Cup. The club only won one game in 1963 and lost all games in 1964. Anglesea was promoted to the Woolworths Cup in 1965 when the Jarman Cup became a reserve grade competition for first division clubs. The club played for this cup until the end of 1969.

In 1970, Anglesea and St Bernards were both demoted to GDFL Woolworths Cup Reserves. Both teams made the grand final with St Bernards winning 13.15 (93) to 6.12 (48). Both clubs were promoted back into the senior competition and Anglesea transferred to the Bellarine District Football League in 1973.

The club has a winning rate of 49.7%.

== Premierships ==
Bellarine Football League (4): 1983, 1991, 1999, 2025

== Notable VFL/AFL players ==
- Ian Lewtas - Geelong
- Patrick Dangerfield - Adelaide, Geelong
- James Gowans - St Kilda
- Dyson Bell-Warren (Geelong VFL)
- Stu Mackenzie (Frontman of rock band King Gizzard and the Lizard Wizard)
- Ned Reeves

== Bibliography ==
- Cat Country: History of Football in the Geelong Region by John Stoward – Aussie Footy Books, 2008 – ISBN 9780957751583
