= John Meesen =

Australian rules footballer (born 1986)

Personal information
- Full name: John Meesen
- Born: 20 June 1986 (age 40)
- Original teams: Modewarre Football Club; Geelong Falcons
- Draft: 8th overall, 2004 national draft Adelaide
- Height: 200 cm (6 ft 7 in)
- Weight: 95 kg (209 lb)
- Position: Ruckman

Playing career^{1}
Years	Club	Games (Goals)
2005–2007	Adelaide	2 (0)
2008–2010	Melbourne	4 (0)
- ^{1} Playing statistics correct to the end of 2009.

John Meesen (born 20 June 1986) is a former Australian rules football player who played for the Adelaide Football Club and Melbourne Football Club in the Australian Football League (AFL).

As of February 2026, Meesen notably serves as a sports agent for AFL players.

== Playing career ==
Drafted with pick eight in the 2004 draft, Meesen had a long wait to play his first senior game for Adelaide. Playing for Norwood in the South Australian National Football League (SANFL), Meesen was a leading ruckman in the senior side, but was incapable of surpassing Rhett Biglands, Ben Hudson and Matthew Clarke for a spot in the Crows team. Following Biglands' 2007 season-ending injury in the 2006 preliminary final and Clarke's move to St Kilda, it was thought that Meesen would begin season 2007 as back-up ruckman to Hudson. However an injury-plagued pre-season saw Jonathon Griffin and Ivan Maric move ahead of him in the pecking order.

Meesen finally made his debut in round 20, 2007 against the Western Bulldogs at AAMI Stadium at the expense of Griffin. In October 2007, Meesen was traded to Melbourne for the 37th selection in the 2007 AFL draft. He made his Melbourne debut in round 3, 2009 against Port Adelaide at AAMI Stadium.

Meesen was delisted at the end of the 2009 season along with Michael Newton; both were re-drafted as mature age rookies. After failing to play a senior match in 2010 due to injury, Meesen was delisted at season's end. Melbourne subsequently appointed Meesen to the role of part-time development coach.
