= Drysdale Football Netball Club =

Sports club

Drysdale

Names
- Full name: Drysdale Football Club
- Nickname: Hawks

Club details
- Founded: 1879; 147 years ago
- Colours
- Competition: Bellarine Football League
- Premierships: (14): 1926, 1928, 1935, 1955, 1962, 1963, 1966, 1969, 1970, 1976, 1977, 1985, 2009, 2010
- Ground: Drysdale Recreation Reserve

Uniforms
Home

Other information
- Official website: drysdalefc.com.au

The Drysdale Football Club, nicknamed the Hawks, is an Australian rules football club that plays in the Bellarine Football League and is situated in the township of Drysdale, in the centre of the Bellarine Peninsula, Victoria, Australia. The club plays its home games at Drysdale Recreation Reserve, Drysdale.

Its teams currently compete in the Bellarine Football League, a competition based in the Bellarine Peninsula region of Victoria, Australia, formed in 1971.

== History ==
The club was established in 1879. Drysdale club played in an early version Bellarine Football League that ran from 1895 to 1914. Reformed after the great war the club continued to play locally until 1924 when it joined the Geelong Football Association.

The Drysdale Football Club continued to play in various Geelong district competitions until the Bellarine District Football League was formed in 1971. Drysdale won back to back premierships in the GDFL prior to joining the new league. Since joining the Bellarine District Football League the club has a winning rate of 60.1%.

The Drysdale Football Club was first formed in 1879 when, as reported in the Geelong Advertiser, a team played the Chillwell 2nds on Saturday, 14 June. The side, captained by Cuddy, was defeated six goals to two. Other games followed that year against East Geelong, Artillery, and Wanderers, with a draw against Artillery the best result.

Early games were played at a ground behind the hotel known as The Buck's Head. This was also the location of the race-track, and the ground was most likely in the centre of it.

In 1900 The Bellarine Football Competition was formed with games previous to that being by invitation only. Drysdale, Portarlington, and Queenscliff were the inaugural teams with Military joining some years later. The club's first premiership came in 1903 with an impressive marble clock being awarded to the victors. The clock can still be seen in the clubrooms today.

The club colours have changed many times over the years with membership tickets giving us the best indication of early colour combinations. The club has in its possession a maroon and gold ticket from 1891, a blue & white ticket from 1912, and a red & white ticket from 1935.

The club continued to wear white jumpers with a red sash until 1948 when new jumpers were urgently required but these colours were unavailable. The brown jumper with gold collar & cuffs was adopted & worn until 1978 when brown & gold vertical stripes were chosen for financial reasons. The final change came in 2005 when the club reverted to the 1948 design of brown jumpers with a gold vee.

Throughout its history the Drysdale Football Club has played in several different competitions experiencing much success resulting in thirteen senior, five reserves, four under 18, five under 16, & six under 13 premierships.

== Premierships ==
- Bellarine Football League (5): 1976, 1977, 1985, 2009, 2010

== Notable VFL/AFL and VFLW/AFLW players ==
- Dick Grigg with Geelong
- Ron Lunn with Geelong
- Russell Renfrey with Geelong
- Adam Richardson with Adelaide
- Tom Ruggles with Geelong
- Connor Idun with Greater Western Sydney Football Club
- Tess Craven with North Melbourne Football Club

== Notable netball players ==
- Emily Mannix-Melbourne Vixens

== Bibliography ==
- Cat Country: History of Football in the Geelong Region by John Stoward – Aussie Footy Books, 2008 – ISBN 9780957751583
