= Jim Hovey =

Australian rules footballer

Personal information
- Full name: James Henry Lawrence Hovey
- Born: 15 August 1922; Mount Rowan, Victoria
- Died: 28 March 1995 (aged 72); Shepparton, Victoria
- Original team: Modewarre
- Height: 173 cm (5 ft 8 in)
- Weight: 75 kg (165 lb)

Playing career^{1}
Years	Club	Games (Goals)
1946–1948	Geelong	41 (8)
- ^{1} Playing statistics correct to the end of 1948.

James Henry Lawrence Hovey (15 August 1922 – 28 March 1995) was an Australian rules footballer who played with Geelong in the Victorian Football League (VFL).

Hovey, a back pocket player, arrived at Geelong from Modewarre and debuted in 1946, when he appeared in every game from round seven. He played 17 games in 1947 and gathered all of his five career Brownlow Medal votes that year, then made a further 11 appearances in 1948.

Following his career at Geelong, Hovey coached in country Victoria, first at Wimmera Football League club Murtoa in 1949, before being appointed coach of Mooroopna in 1950.

Hovey kicked two goals for Shepparton when they defeated Tatura in the 1951 Goulburn Valley Football League grand final.

Hovey won the 1952 Central Goulburn Valley Football League best and fairest award, the Neal Hanlon Trophy, as captain / coach of Tallygaroopna.

He was the second of three brothers to play league football for Geelong, the eldest Ced Hovey played 10 games in 1945 and the youngest Ron Hovey captained the club in 1960. His son, Wayne Hovey, also played with Geelong.
