= Geelong Amateur Football & Netball Club =

Geelong Amateur

Names
- Full name: The Geelong Amateur Football & Netball Club Inc.
- Nickname: Ammos

Club details
- Founded: 1926; 100 years ago
- Colours
- Competition: Bellarine Football League
- Premierships: 1931, 1953, 1966, 1972, 1985, 2004, 2008, 2014, 2015, 2016
- Ground: Queens Park, Highton

Uniforms
Home

Other information
- Official website: geelongamateur.com.au

The Geelong Amateur Football & Netball Club, nicknamed the Ammos, is an Australian rules football and netball club situated in the regional city of Geelong, Victoria, Australia.

GAFNC teams currently play in the Bellarine Football League.

== History ==
The Geelong Amateur Football Club was formed in 1926 as a result of teachers and students from The Geelong College and Geelong Grammar forming a football team to play in the Victorian Amateur Football Association. As such, it uses the green (College) and light blue (Grammar) colours, plus the Pegasus logo of The Geelong College.

They moved to their current home at Queens Park, Highton, in 1957.

They started in the VAFA, participating as high as A Grade before in 1983 the club decided to base itself in Geelong and joined the Geelong and District Football League. Playing in the VAFA meant travelling to Melbourne every fortnight, whereas joining the Geelong & District Football League meant that all games were played locally.

In 1985, they won the GDFL premiership. The club then briefly went up to the Geelong Football League but was unable to sustain itself there and moved back to the GDFL in 1989.

The club experienced a period of troubled times over the next few years and, after much soul-searching and survival meetings, in 1995 the club joined the Bellarine Football League and has remained there since, winning Senior Football Premierships in 2004, 2008, 2014, 2015 & 2016.

== Premierships ==
Men's football (10)

- Victorian Amateur Football Association
  - 1931, 1953, 1966, 1972
- Geelong & District Football League
  - 1985
- Bellarine Football League
  - 2004, 2008, 2014, 2015, 2016

Women's football (4)

- AFL Barwon Female Football (Division 1)
  - 2022, 2023, 2025, 2026

== League awards ==
=== League Best & Fairest ===
- 2001: Mark Trevaskis
- 2009: Lindsay Smith

=== League Leading Goalkickers ===
- 2010 Jason Tom: 89
- 2011 Jason Tom: 120
- 2015 Mitchell Day: 114
- 2016 Mitchell Day: 87

== Notable players ==
=== VFL/AFL players ===
- Graeme Linke with Geelong and Footscray.
- David Clarke with Geelong and Carlton.
- Tim Clarke with Hawthorn.
- Spiro Malakellis with Geelong
- Tony Malakellis with Geelong and Sydney Swans.
- Tim Clark with Geelong Football club
- Ben Bucovaz with Fremantle
- Josh Saunders with St Kilda
- Mason Wood with North Melbourne
- Hugh Goddard with St Kilda
- Peter Featherby with Footscray 1975–76 and Geelong 1979–83
- Jai Sheahan with Melbourne FC.

=== Other ===
- Lindsay Hassett (Test cricketer)
- Ian Redpath (Test cricketer)

== Seasons ==
Premiers	Grand Finalist	Minor premiers	Finals appearance	Wooden spoon	Division leading goalkicker	Division best and fairest

=== Men's ===
==== Seniors ====
Year	League	Division	Finish	W	L	D	Coach	Captain	Best and fairest	Leading goalkicker	Ref
1926	MAFA	A Section	7th								
1927	MAFA	A Section	9th	4	14	0					
