= Darryl Stephens (footballer) =

Australian rules footballer (born 1944)

Personal information
- Full name: Darryl Stephens
- Born: 10 January 1944
- Original team: Barwon Heads
- Height: 188 cm (6 ft 2 in)
- Weight: 80 kg (176 lb)

Playing career^{1}
Years	Club	Games (Goals)
1961–64	Geelong	17 (2)
- ^{1} Playing statistics correct to the end of 1964.

Darryl Stephens (born 10 January 1944) is a former Australian rules footballer who played with Geelong in the Victorian Football League (VFL). In AFL, per 1965 he ranked 7,252nd player to appear, 6,670th amongst most games played, 7,772nd on goals kicked.

As in Geelong, pre-1965, he was 656th player to appear with 574th most games played and 673rd most goals kicked
