= George Carroll Curtis =

American sculptor (1872–1926)

George Carroll Curtis (July 15, 1872 – February 2, 1926) was an American geographical sculptor. He created sculptures and models of geographical features, both natural and human-made.

== Early life and education ==
George Carroll Curtis was born on July 15, 1872, in Abington, Massachusetts, to Mary A. and George E. Curtis.

After graduating from Harvard University in 1896, Curtis studied geographic modeling under William Morris Davis, while at the same time acting as an assistant in Harvard's department of geology and geography.

== Works ==
His model of metropolitan Boston, made for the state of Massachusetts, was exhibited at the 1900 Paris World's Fair and received a gold medal. Curtis then went to Zurich, Switzerland, where he studied under Albert Heim, producing a model of Säntis. In 1902, he made two models of Washington, D.C., for the United States Senate, one from a photographic survey of the city, the other a model on lines of proposed development. As of Curtis's death in 1926, both models were in the Library of Congress.

Curtis' next major work was on geographic models of land forms. Alexander Agassiz commissioned a model of Bora Bora; Curtis spent nearly a year there, surveying and photographing the island for his model. Curtis completed a model of another coral island, Funafuti, afterwards.

Between 1909 and 1911, he sailed alone to Maine and Newfoundland to explore coastal fjords.

In 1913, Robert W. Sayles, curator of the Harvard Geological Museum (now the Harvard Mineralogical Museum), commissioned Curtis to model the Hawaiian volcano Kīlauea. Curtis undertook a survey of the volcano's caldera and hired J. Fred Haworth, a businessman and amateur photographer from Pittsburgh, to take pictures of the volcano from kites. Curtis finished his Kīlauea model in 1917.

On his way home from Kīlauea, Curtis examined volcanic islands, including Java and Sumatra, and saw over forty active vents. He had had experience earlier in the field of active volcanism as a member of the National Geographic Society's expedition which studied the eruption of Mount Pelée and La Soufrière in 1902.

Curtis made three relief models of American sites: Yosemite, Niagara Falls, and the Grand Canyon.

He died on February 2, 1926, in Boston. When he died, he was building a relief map of the United States. Many of Curtis' works are in Harvard's museum collections.

== Publications ==
- Curtis, George Carroll (1900). A Description of the Topographical Model of Metropolitan Boston. Wright & Potter; Commonwealth of Massachusetts. OCLC 1042989375.
- Smith, G. O.; Curtis, George Carroll (1900). "Camasland: A Valley Remnant". Geological Society of America Bulletin. 11 (1): 217–222. doi:10.1130/GSAB-11-217. ISSN 0016-7606.
- Curtis, George Carroll (1913). "The Fishing Banks off Our Atlantic Coast". Bulletin of the American Geographical Society. 45 (6): 413. doi:10.2307/200592. JSTOR 200592.
- Curtis, George Carroll (1911). "Land Reliefs That Are True to Nature". Bulletin of the American Geographical Society. 43 (6): 418–427. doi:10.2307/199478. ISSN 0190-5929. JSTOR 199478.

== Sources ==
- Sayles, Robert W. (January 1918). "A Naturalistic Model of Kilauea Volcano, Hawaii". Geographical Review. 5 (1): 38–43. Bibcode:1918GeoRv...5...38S. doi:10.2307/207499. JSTOR 207499.
- Sayles, Robert W. (1926). "Obituary: George Carroll Curtis". Geographical Review. 16 (2): 332–333. ISSN 0016-7428. JSTOR 208690.
