= Winchelsea Football & Netball Club =

Sports club in Victoria, Australia

Winchelsea

Names
- Full name: Winchelsea Football & Netball Club
- Nickname: Blues

Club details
- Founded: 1876; 150 years ago
- Colours
- Competition: Geelong District FL
- President: Angus Leigh
- Coach: Ben Moloney
- Premierships: 1896, 1897, 1910, 1911, 1912, 1913, 1914, 1924, 1926, 1932, 1937, 1938, 1939, 1951, 1957, 1960, 1969, 1970, 1987
- Ground: Eastern Reserve

Uniforms
Home

The Winchelsea Football & Netball Club, nicknamed the Blues, is an Australian rules football and netball club based in the town of Winchelsea, Victoria.

The club teams currently compete in the Geelong & District Football League, since 2002.

== History ==
The Winchelsea Football Club was founded in 1876. It was a founding club of the Polwarth Football Association in 1923. It was a founding club of the Bellarine Football League in 1971. It played in the Colac & District Football League from 1983 to 2001. It got admission to the Geelong DFL in 2002

== Premierships ==
- 1896, 1897, 1910, 1911, 1912, 1913, 1914, 1924, 1926, 1932, 1937, 1938, 1939, 1951, 1957, 1960, 1969, 1970, 1987.

== Grandstand ==
The grandstand was designed by Walter Burley Griffin and is heritage listed.

== Bibliography ==
- Cat Country - History of Football In The Geelong Region - John Stoward - ISBN 978-0-9577515-8-3
