= Torquay Football Club =

Torquay

Names
- Full name: Torquay Football Club Inc.
- Nickname: Tigers

Club details
- Founded: 1952; 74 years ago
- Colours
- Competition: Bellarine Football League
- Premierships: 10 (1971, 1984, 1986, 1987, 1989, 1998, 2006, 2017, 2023, 2024)
- Ground: Torquay Recreation Reserve

Uniforms
Home

Other information
- Official website: torquaytigers.com

The Torquay Football Club, nicknamed the Tigers, is an Australian rules football and netball club based in the town of Torquay, Victoria. The Tigers teams currently play in the Bellarine Football League.

== History ==
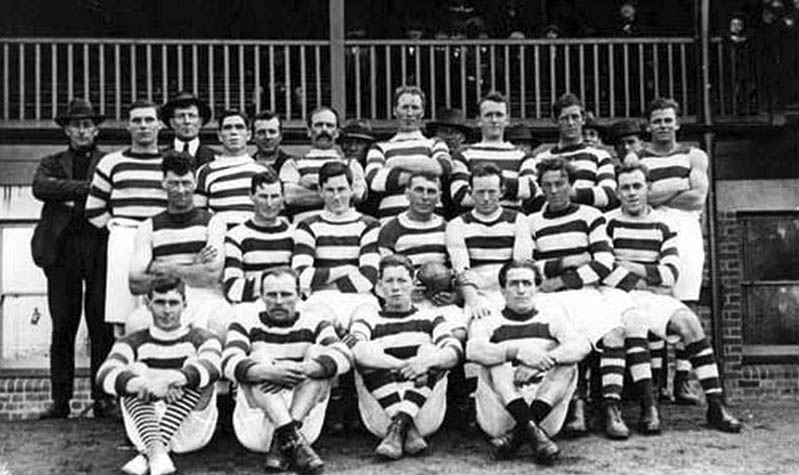
A Torquay team in 1920

The area between Torquay and Anglesea was served by the Freshwater Creek Football Club until 1952. The original "Torquay Football Club" was formed after World War I, and its first colours were blue and white. The club was disbanded during World War II. In 1952, Geo McCartney founded a junior Torquay FC team, while a senior squad was reformed in 1953. The first games were played on the Laurie Dean oval at the camping ground. The first competition the club played in was the "Jarman Cup", coached by Joel Witherton.

Because second-hand jumpers were donated by the Richmond Football Club, the club became known as the Tigers. The club won its first premiership in 1960. Torquay then played in the Polwarth Football League, from 1964 to 1970.

The Torquay Football Club was a founding member of the Bellarine District Football League in 1971.

== Premierships ==
- Geelong & District Football League (3): 1960, 1961, 1962
- Bellarine Football League (10): 1971, 1984, 1986, 1987, 1989, 1998, 2006, 2017, 2023, 2024

== Notable VFL/AFL players ==
The "bee" kit worn by many years
- Travis Boak with Port Adelaide
- Robert Scott with Geelong and North Melbourne
- Dale Lewis with Sydney
- Jasper Pittard with Port Adelaide
- Charlie Curnow with Carlton
- Peter McDonald with Richmond and Melbourne

== In popular culture ==
The 2013 film Blinder was set around a fictional story about a group of players of the Torquay club. Ten years after a scandal tore the fabric of the club apart, Tom Dunn returns home to face the townfolk who hadn't forgotten. Inspired by his late coach, Tom sets about mending fences and helping his old club.

Starring Oliver Ackland (as Tom Dunn) and Anna Hutchison, the film was not well received by critics, being negatively reviewed.

== Bibliography ==
- Cat Country: History of Football in the Geelong Region by John Stoward – Aussie Footy Books, 2008 – ISBN 9780957751583
