= Brian O'Keefe (footballer) =

Australian rules footballer

Personal information
- Full name: Brian O'Keefe
- Born: 10 December 1956 (age 69)
- Original team: Preston
- Height: 196 cm (6 ft 5 in)
- Weight: 92 kg (203 lb)

Playing career^{1}
Years	Club	Games (Goals)
1980	Footscray	3 (1)
- ^{1} Playing statistics correct to the end of 1980.

Brian O'Keefe (born 10 December 1956) is a former Australian rules footballer who played with Footscray in the Victorian Football League (VFL).
