= Portarlington Football Netball Club =

Portarlington

Names
- Full name: Portarlington Demons Football Netball Club Inc.
- Nickname: Demons

Club details
- Founded: 1874; 152 years ago
- Colours
- Competition: Bellarine Football League
- Ground: Portarlington Recreation Reserve

Uniforms
Home

Other information
- Official website: portarlingtonfnc.com.au

The Portarlington Football Netball Club, nicknamed the Demons, is an Australian rules football and netball club situated in the township of Portarlington, Victoria, on the Bellarine Peninsula. Portarlington teams currently play in the Bellarine Football League and its home ground is the Portarlington Recreation Reserve, Portarlington.

== History ==
The club was established in 1874. The club played in an early version Bellarine Football League that ran from 1895 to 1914. Reformed after World War I, the club continued to play locally until 1923 when it joined the Geelong Football Association. Portarlington used to wear the red and black Essendon jumper, but this clashed with Birreguarra when the club changed leagues.

A new strip based on the Melbourne jumper of red and blue was adopted. The Portarlington Football Club played the 1964 season in the Polwarth Football League and continued in this league until the Bellarine District Football League was formed in 1971. Portarlington was a founding club and P. Harrison won the goalkicking that year.

Since joining the Bellarine District Football League the club has a winning rate of 49.7%. For two seasons in the 1990s the club was Portarlington–St Leonards, but later reverted to its original name.

== Premierships ==
- Queenscliff & Bellarine Football Association (3): 1906, 1909, 1911
- Geelong & District Football League:
  - Woolworths Cup (1): 1947
  - Jarman Cup (3): 1953, 1958, 1959
- Bellarine Football League (2): 1978, 1992

== Notable VFL/AFL players ==
- Brian Chirgwin with Geelong
- Barry Smith
- Jim Nash with Geelong
- John Hyde with Geelong
- Barry Ward with Geelong
- Barrie Bretland with Geelong
- Max Trewin with Geelong
- Scott Allen with Footscray
