= Colac Imperials Football Netball Club =

Australian rules football and netball club

Colac Imperials

Names
- Full name: Colac Imperials Football Netball Club
- Nickname(s): Cats, Imps

Club details
- Founded: 1922; 104 years ago
- Colours: navy blue white
- Competition: Colac DFL
- President: Peter Lucas
- Coach: Paul Liistro
- Captain: Jeremy Spokes

Uniforms
Home

Other information
- Official website: colacimperials.com.au

The Colac Imperials Football Netball Club is an Australian rules football and netball club which competes in the Colac DFL since its founding in 1937.

They are based in the Victorian town of Colac. Colac Imperials play in Colac, the main regional centre for the region.

== History ==
The club was formed from the disbanded St Andrews Football Club who had played in the Colac Churches Association. The term Imperial comes from the military “Imperial Forces” connection, with many players being ex-servicemen.

The club also did not wish to be known just as Colac in case they became responsible for any debts of that club. During their time pre-WWII in the Colac Association, the club played against Coragulac Rovers, Warrion, Swan Marsh, Alvie, Nalangil, Elliminyt and St Mary’s (Colac). The club went into recess due to World War II from 1940 to 1944.

(In May 1940, Colac Imperials played a team from the RAAF base at Cressy).

The club reformed in 1945 and won the 1945 grand final. In 1948, Colac Diggers Football Club (Made up of returned servicemen) disbanded and a number of the players transferred to the Imperials. In 1949 a large number of Imperials players moved across to the newly formed Colac Tigers, they in turn took over the Western Oval, thus Imperials moved back to the Colac Showgrounds. In 1950, after being successful in the CDFL, the club moved to the Polwarth Football Association. Participating teams were: Apollo Bay, Lorne, Winchelsea, Deans Marsh, Birregurra, Beeac, Coragulac Rovers and Forrest. Winchelsea had a similar dark blue jumper with a white monogram, so it was necessary to change the jumper to the Geelong style. In 1950 there was a mass exodus of clubs from the CDFL, the cause was that the Colac (Hampden league) team wanted to have the right to pick any player from the Colac DFL without needing a clearance. The result was Colac Imperials opted to leave and join the Polwarth FL and be away from Colac's reach. It spent five years in that competition before returning to the CDFL.

The club moved back to the CDFL in 1955 and also back to the Colac Showgrounds for seven years before moving finally to the Western Reserve in 1972.

With 12 senior flags to their credit since 1945, the Cats have been the Colac and District Football League’s second most successful post-war club, behind Alvie.

== Current Day ==
- President - Carl Winchcomb
- Senior Men Football Coach - Paul Liistro
- Senior Women Netball Coach - Chloe Gray
- Senior Women Football Coach - Ethan Schroder

== Premiership Years ==
1945, 1947, 1949, 1960, 1963, 1964, 1968, 1979, 1986, 1989, 1991, 1995

== VFL/AFL players ==
- Luke Hodge – AFL Hawthorn & Brisbane
- Darcy Moloney – AFLW Geelong

== Bibliography ==
- Cat Country - History of Football In The Geelong Region - John Stoward - ISBN 978-0-9577515-8-3
- Football Country Style : a history of football in the Colac District from 1900-1974 by Bill Doran
