= Ced Hovey =

Australian rules footballer

Personal information
- Full name: Cedric John Hovey
- Born: 12 July 1918; Buangor, Victoria
- Died: 19 February 2014 (aged 95); Geelong, Victoria
- Original team: Modewarre
- Height: 177 cm (5 ft 10 in)
- Weight: 76 kg (168 lb)

Playing career^{1}
| Years | Club | Games (Goals) |
| 1945 | Geelong | 10 (0) |
- ^{1} Playing statistics correct to the end of 1945.

Cedric John Hovey (12 July 1918 – 19 February 2014) was an Australian rules footballer who played with Geelong in the Victorian Football League (VFL).

== Career ==
Hovey, who came from Modewarre, was runner-up in the Geelong seconds best and fairest award for the 1944 season. Mostly as a centreman, Hovey made 10 appearances with the senior side in the 1945 VFL season, debuting at the age of 26. He didn't play VFL football in 1946 and instead captained the Geelong seconds.

In 1947 he was cleared to Geelong West, in the Ballarat Football League. At Geelong West, Hovey was a best and fairest winner and captain-coached the club in 1948.

== Personal life ==
Hovey was one of four brothers to play football for Geelong. Most successful of the four was Ron Hovey, who was a member of Geelong's 1951 and 1952 premiership teams. Another, Jim, played 41 league games in the late 1940s. The eldest of the four, Bernard "Bern" Hovey, played for the Geelong seconds, before his death in an RAAF air crash in 1943.

On 19 February 2014, Hovey died at his home in Geelong, aged 95. He was the oldest surviving Geelong player at the time of his death.
