= Ron Hovey =

Personal information
- Born: 25 August 1932
- Died: 6 January 2015 (aged 82)
- Original teams: St Brendans Shepparton, Shepparton Boys
- Height: 179 cm (5 ft 10 in)
- Weight: 79 kg (174 lb)

Playing career^{1}
Years	Club	Games (Goals)
1951–1960	Geelong	141 (25)
- ^{1} Playing statistics correct to the end of 1960.

Career highlights
- Geelong premiership player 1951,52; 3 time VFL interstate representative

Ronald Clive Hovey OAM (25 August 1932 – 6 January 2015) was an Australian rules footballer who played with Geelong in the Victorian Football League (VFL).

== Career ==
Hovey played in the 1947 Shepparton Boys Football Club's Central Goulburn Valley Football League premiership team as a 15-year-old before moving to Geelong to play in the Geelong Under-19's side in 1948.

Hovey was a regular in the Geelong backline during the 1950s and would sometimes push into the midfield. He was a member of Geelong's 1951 and 1952 premiership teams. Hovey, who finished equal seventh in the 1959 Brownlow Medal, was captain of Geelong in 1960, his final season. Hovey was forced to retire six games into the 1960 VFL season due to an ongoing knee injury.

Two of his brothers, Ced and Jim, also played league football for Geelong.

== Later years ==
Following his retirement from his playing career, Hovey continued with Geelong in a number of administrative roles, serving as club president of Geelong Football Club from 1988 until 1998. He was awarded life membership of the club, social club, past players association, the 'Pivots' coterie group, and the Australian Football League.

Hovey was awarded the Medal of the Order of Australia (OAM) in the 1997 Australia Day Honours and the Centenary Medal in 2001.

He died on 6 January 2015, aged 82.
