= Bellarine Football Netball League =

Australian sports league

- Formerly: Bellarine & District Football League (1971–1985); Bellarine Football League (1986–2010)
- Sport: Australian rules football Netball
- Founded: 1971; 55 years ago
- No. of teams: 10
- Country: Australia
- Headquarters: Highton, Victoria, Australia
- Confederation: AFL Barwon
- Sponsor: Dow Chemical Company
- Related competitions: Geelong FNL; Geelong & District FNL; Polwarth FL
- Website: aflbarwon.com.au/bfnl

The Bellarine Football Netball League (BFNL) is an Australian rules football and netball competition based in the Bellarine Peninsula region of Victoria, Australia. Established in 1971 as the Bellarine & District Football League, the competition was formed out of the ashes of the Polwarth Football League, which had six of its former teams join.

The competition was renamed the Bellarine Football League in 1986, and finally the Bellarine Football Netball League in 2011 when the local netball competition was administratively aligned with the football competition for the first time. Prior to 2011, netball clubs competed in a competition overseen by the Bellarine District Netball Association.

The BFNL forms part of the second tier of football in the Geelong area, along with the Geelong Football Netball League (GFNL) and the Geelong & District Football League.

In March 2024, following extensive consultation, AFL Barwon detailed a plan for expanding the BFNL to 12 teams from 2025 with a path for a team to accept an invitation for promotion to the GFNL, replacing a club that would then be relegated from the GFNL. However, both Torquay and Geelong Amateur declined the invitation to join the GFNL for the 2026 season, resulting in an 11-team BFNL competition for 2026 due to the inclusion of Surf Coast.

== Clubs ==
=== Current clubs ===
Club	Colours	Moniker	Home venue	Former league	Est.	Years in BFNL	BFNL premierships			
Club	Colours	Moniker	Home venue	Former league	Est.	Years in BFNL	Football		Netball	
Club	Colours	Moniker	Home venue	Former league	Est.	Years in BFNL	Total	Most recent	Total	Most recent
Anglesea		Roos	Ellimatta Reserve, Anglesea	GDFL	1963	1973–	4	2025	1	2012
Barwon Heads		Seagulls	Howard Harmer Reserve, Barwon Heads	GDFL	1922	1971–	6	2022	0	—
Drysdale		Hawks	Drysdale Recreational Reserve, Drysdale	GDFL	1879	1971–	5	2010	0	—
Geelong Amateur		Ammos, Pegasus	Queens Park, Highton	GDFL	1926	1995–	5	2016	3	2022
Modewarre		Warriors	Mt Moriac Recreation Reserve, Mount Moriac	GDFL	1879	1996–	1	2018	3	2018
Newcomb		Power	Grinter Reserve, Moolap	—	1975	1976–	6	2007	0	—
Ocean Grove		Grubbers	Shell Road Reserve, Ocean Grove	PFL	1964	1971–	8	2003	4	2026
Portarlington		Demons	Portarlington Recreation Reserve, Portarlington	PFL	1874	1971–	2	1992	0	—
Queenscliff		Coutas	Queenscliff Recreation Reserve, Queenscliff	PFL	1884	1971–	5	2026	0	—
Surf Coast		Suns	Banyul-Warri Fields Sporting Precinct, Torquay	—	2016	2026–	0	—	0	—
Torquay		Tigers	Spring Creek Reserve,Torquay	PFL	1952	1971–	10	2024	3	2019

=== Former clubs ===
Club	Colours	Moniker	Home venue	Former league	Est.	Years in BFNL	BFNL premierships		Fate
Club	Colours	Moniker	Home venue	Former league	Est.	Years in BFNL	Total	Most recent	Fate
Leopold		Lions	Leopold Memorial Park, Leopold	PFL	1955	1971–1991	2	1990	Moved to Geelong FNL in 1992
St Leonards		Saints	St Leonards Lake Reserve, St Leonards	—	1985	1985–1991	0	—	Moved to Geelong & District FNL in 1992
Winchelsea		Blues	Eastern Reserve, Winchelsea	PFL	1876	1971–1982	0	—	Moved to Colac & District FL in 1983

== Premiers ==
=== Senior football ===
The winner of the best on ground award is presented with the Josh Finch Medal, named in honour of the Modewarre games record holder who retired at the conclusion of the 2025 season with a record four Les Ash Medals to his name. The award's renaming was announced during the 2025 Ash Medal presentation night.

^{+}	Team also won the minor premiership for finishing on top of the ladder
^{^}	Player also won the Les Ash Medal as the best and fairest in the league

Season	Premiers	Runners-up	Score	Venue	Best on ground	Ref.
1971	Torquay	Queenscliff	18.5 (113) d. 6.15 (51)	Ocean Grove Memorial Reserve	Graham Muncey (Torquay)	
1972	Barwon Heads^{+}	Ocean Grove	18.20 (128) d. 15.9 (99)	Leopold Memorial Park	Garry Hamer (Barwon Heads)	
1973	Barwon Heads^{+} (2)	Winchelsea	19.11 (125) d. 11.9 (75)	Spring Creek Reserve	Brian Marshman (Barwon Heads)	
1974	Barwon Heads^{+} (3)	Ocean Grove	13.14 (92) d. 11.13 (79)	Spring Creek Reserve	Geoff Fry^{^} (Barwon Heads)	
1975	Queenscliff^{+}	Drysdale	14.16 (100) d. 11.10 (76)	Leopold Memorial Park	Peter Growney (Queenscliff)	
1976	Drysdale	Torquay	23.10 (148) d. 19.13 (127)	Leopold Memorial Park	Greg Scott (Drysdale)	
1977	Drysdale (2)	Queenscliff	12.10 (82) d. 11.12 (78)	Portarlington Recreation Reserve	David Hall (Drysdale)	
1978	Portarlington	Drysdale	12.19 (91) d. 5.14 (44)	Howard Harmer Reserve	Vincent Guiffe (Portarlington)	
1979	Leopold	Newcomb	18.12 (120) d. 17.9 (111)	Spring Creek Reserve	Peter Lewis (Leopold)	
1980	Newcomb	Portarlington	13.17 (95) d. 9.12 (66)	Leopold Memorial Park	Greg Herbet (Newcomb)	
1981	Newcomb^{+} (2)	Torquay	17.10 (112) d. 12.9 (81)	Howard Harmer Reserve	John Fagan^{^} (Newcomb)	
1982	Newcomb (3)	Torquay	19.15 (129) d. 8.9 (57)	Leopold Memorial Park	John Fagan (2) (Newcomb)	
1983	Anglesea	Torquay	14.14 (98) d. 13.6 (84)	Portarlington Recreation Reserve	Brian O’Keefe (Anglesea)	
1984	Torquay (2)	Drysdale	19.11 (125) d. 19.10 (124)	Leopold Memorial Park	Alan Lynch (Drysdale)	
1985	Drysdale (3)	Leopold	20.26 (146) d. 11.6 (72)	Portarlington Recreation Reserve	Darren Wilson (Drysdale)	
Bellarine Football League name adopted
1986	Torquay^{+} (3)	Newcomb	21.21 (147) d. 4.12 (36)	Howard Harmer Reserve	Shane Jacobsen (Torquay)	
1987	Torquay^{+} (4)	Leopold	13.16 (94) d. 10.14 (74)	Leopold Memorial Park	Dale Lewis (Torquay)	
1988	Newcomb (4)	Drysdale	14.7 (91) d. 11.12 (78)	Leopold Memorial Park	Ross Gibson (Newcomb)	
1989	Torquay^{+} (5)	Drysdale	11.15 (81) d. 9.18 (72)	Portarlington Recreation Reserve	John McMahon (Torquay)	
1990	Leopold^{+} (2)	Anglesea	17.5 (107) d. 11.13 (79)	Drysdale Recreation Reserve	Peter Lange (Leopold)	
1991	Anglesea^{+} (2)	Leopold	10.15 (75) d. 5.7 (37)	Portarlington Recreation Reserve	Darren Fraser (Anglesea)	
1992	Portarlington^{+} (2)	Drysdale	10.6 (66) d. 4.11 (35)	Drysdale Recreation Reserve	Brian Canny (Portarlington)	
1993	Barwon Heads^{+} (4)	Ocean Grove	19.17 (131) d. 10.16 (76)	Drysdale Recreation Reserve	Antony Callan (Barwon Heads)	
1994	Ocean Grove^{+}	Portarlington	16.6 (102) d. 5.12 (42)	Drysdale Recreation Reserve	Dean Gills (Ocean Grove)	
1995	Ocean Grove^{+} (2)	Anglesea	17.12 (114) d. 11.11 (77)	Drysdale Recreation Reserve	Matthew McTaggart (Ocean Grove)	
1996	Ocean Grove^{+} (3)	Anglesea	12.12 (84) d. 7.12 (54)	Drysdale Recreation Reserve	Steven Sherwell (Ocean Grove)	
1997	Ocean Grove^{+} (4)	Anglesea	11.10 (76) d. 4.2 (26)	Drysdale Recreation Reserve	Will McTaggart (Ocean Grove)	
1998	Torquay^{+} (6)	Ocean Grove	9.8 (62) d. 6.7 (43)	Drysdale Recreation Reserve	George Arnold^{^} (Torquay)	
1999	Anglesea^{+} (3)	Ocean Grove	13.16 (94) d. 12.12 (84)	Drysdale Recreation Reserve	Ian Benny (Anglesea)	
2000	Ocean Grove^{+} (5)	Anglesea	16.13 (109) d. 7.12 (54)	Drysdale Recreation Reserve	Mathew Payne^{^} (Ocean Grove)	
2001	Ocean Grove^{+} (6)	Drysdale	23.16 (154) d. 12.8 (80)	Drysdale Recreation Reserve	Kane Montgomery (Ocean Grove)	
2002	Ocean Grove (7)	Drysdale	12.23 (95) d. 6.7 (43)	Spring Creek Reserve	James Dalton (Ocean Grove)	
2003	Ocean Grove (8)	Geelong Amateur	12.9 (81) d. 10.12 (72)	Drysdale Recreation Reserve	Liam Rock (Ocean Grove)	
2004	Geelong Amateur^{+}	Ocean Grove	18.9 (117) d. 11.5 (71)	Drysdale Recreation Reserve	Haami Williams (Geelong Amateur)	
2005	Newcomb^{+} (5)	Torquay	15.18 (108) d. 11.9 (75)	Drysdale Recreation Reserve	Luke McLean (Newcomb)	
2006	Torquay (7)	Newcomb	15.9 (99) d. 13.11 (89)	Drysdale Recreation Reserve	Andrew Wesley (Torquay)	
2007	Newcomb (6)	Ocean Grove	25.15 (165) d. 17.9 (111)	Spring Creek Reserve	Mark Stewart (Newcomb)	
2008	Geelong Amateur^{+} (2)	Torquay	28.11 (179) d. 14.19 (103)	Spring Creek Reserve	Nathan Reid (Geelong Amateur)	
2009	Drysdale (4)	Geelong Amateur	15.18 (108) d. 13.12 (90)	Spring Creek Reserve	Brett Dowie (Drysdale)	
2010	Drysdale^{+} (5)	Geelong Amateur	13.13 (91) d. 11.17 (83)	Spring Creek Reserve	Mitch Scott (Drysdale)	
Bellarine Football Netball League name adopted
2011	Queenscliff (2)	Geelong Amateur	17.22 (124) d. 13.7 (85)	Spring Creek Reserve	Daniel Gibbs (Queenscliff)	
2012	Queenscliff^{+} (3)	Torquay	16.14 (110) d. 12.8 (80)	Drysdale Recreation Reserve	Daniel Gibbs (2) (Queenscliff)	
2013	Queenscliff^{+} (4)	Drysdale	14.16 (100) d. 6.11 (47)	Spring Creek Reserve	Brad Ridings (Queenscliff)	
2014	Geelong Amateur^{+} (3)	Ocean Grove	22.16 (148) d. 8.9 (57)	Spring Creek Reserve	Kane Smith (Geelong Amateur)	
2015	Geelong Amateur (4)	Torquay	16.16 (112) d. 11.14 (80)	Spring Creek Reserve	Peter Street (Geelong Amateur)	
2016	Geelong Amateur^{+} (5)	Modewarre	18.16 (124) d. 11.11 (77)	Drysdale Recreation Reserve	Brad King (Geelong Amateur)	
2017	Torquay^{+} (8)	Geelong Amateur	17.9 (111) d. 7.18 (60)	Drysdale Recreation Reserve	Billy Henderson (Torquay)	
2018	Modewarre	Barwon Heads	14.9 (93) d. 5.16 (46)	Drysdale Recreation Reserve	John Meesen (Modewarre)	
2019	Barwon Heads (5)	Torquay	13.7 (85) d. 10.11 (71)	Spring Creek Reserve	Zach Walter (Barwon Heads)	
2020	Season cancelled due to COVID-19 pandemic					
2021	Season curtailed due to COVID-19 pandemic in Victoria					
2022	Barwon Heads (6)	Torquay	12.12 (84) d. 3.11 (29)	Grinter Reserve	Sammy Baker (Barwon Heads)	
2023	Torquay (9)	Drysdale	16.14 (110) d. 12.6 (78)	Grinter Reserve	Nathan Mifsud (Torquay)	
2024	Torquay (10)	Anglesea	16.17 (113) d. 7.9 (51)	Leopold Memorial Park	Chase Loftus (Torquay)	
2025	Anglesea (4)	Geelong Amateur	14.10 (94) d. 12.9 (81)	Grinter Reserve	Harrison Ling (Anglesea)	
2026	Queenscliff^{+} (5)	Torquay	14.14 (98) d. 6.11 (47)	Grinter Reserve	Caleb Whitley (Queenscliff)	

=== Lower-grade football ===
Season	Reserves	Under-16s	Under-13s	Ref.
1971	Torquay	Queenscliff	Ocean Grove	
1972	Winchelsea	Queenscliff (2)	Ocean Grove (2)	
1973	Ocean Grove	Queenscliff (3)	Portarlington	
1974	Ocean Grove (2)	Ocean Grove	Winchelsea	
1975	Drysdale	Leopold	Torquay	
	Reserves	Under-17s	Under-14s	Ref.
1976	Queenscliff	Torquay	Torquay (2)	
1977	Portarlington	Torquay (2)	Torquay (3)	
1978	Ocean Grove (3)	Newcomb	Newcomb	
1979	Ocean Grove (4)	Torquay (3)	Newcomb (2)	
	Reserves	Under-17s	Under-15s	Ref.
1980	Newcomb	Torquay (4)	Newcomb (3)	
1981	Torquay (2)	Newcomb (2)	Leopold	
	Reserves	Under-18s	Under-15s	Ref.
1982	Leopold	Newcomb (3)	Newcomb (4)	
1983	Torquay (3)	Newcomb (4)	Queenscliff	
1984	Ocean Grove (5)	Newcomb (5)	Newcomb (5)	
1985	Drysdale (2)	Queenscliff (4)	Leopold (2)	
1986	Drysdale (3)	Newcomb (6)	Drysdale	
1987	Barwon Heads	Drysdale	Leopold (3)	
1988	Leopold (2)	Drysdale (2)	Leopold (4)	
1989	Ocean Grove (6)	Drysdale (3)	Drysdale (2)	
1990	Queenscliff (2)	Newcomb (7)	Drysdale (3)	
1991	Ocean Grove (7)	Newcomb (8)	Torquay (4)	
1992	Portarlington (2)	Torquay (5)	Ocean Grove (3)	
1993	Barwon Heads (2)	Drysdale (4)	Ocean Grove (4)	
1994	Ocean Grove (8)	Torquay (6)	Ocean Grove (5)	
1995	Ocean Grove (9)	Ocean Grove (2)	Geelong Amateur	
1996	Ocean Grove (10)	Ocean Grove (3)	Geelong Amateur (2)	
1997	Anglesea	Ocean Grove (4)	Geelong Amateur (3)	
1998	Torquay (4)	Ocean Grove (5)	Drysdale (4)	
1999	Anglesea (2)	Ocean Grove (6)	Geelong Amateur (4)	
2000	Anglesea (3)	Torquay (7)	Geelong Amateur (5)	
2001	Drysdale (4)	Torquay (8)	Junior competition run by Geelong; Junior Football	
2002	Drysdale (5)	Ocean Grove (7)	Junior competition run by Geelong; Junior Football	
2003	Ocean Grove (11)	Ocean Grove (8)	Junior competition run by Geelong; Junior Football	
2004	Geelong Amateur	Torquay (9)	Junior competition run by Geelong; Junior Football	
2005	Torquay (5)	Barwon Heads	Junior competition run by Geelong; Junior Football	
2006	Ocean Grove (12)	Ocean Grove (9)	Junior competition run by Geelong; Junior Football	
2007	Ocean Grove (13)	Geelong Amateur	Junior competition run by Geelong; Junior Football	
2008	Geelong Amateur (2)	Ocean Grove (10)	Junior competition run by Geelong; Junior Football	
2009	Ocean Grove (14)	Ocean Grove (11)	Junior competition run by Geelong; Junior Football	
2010	Geelong Amateur (3)	Ocean Grove (12)	Junior competition run by Geelong; Junior Football	
2011	Modewarre	Geelong Amateur	Junior competition run by AFL Barwon	
2012	Ocean Grove (15)	Colts competition run by AFL Barwon	Junior competition run by AFL Barwon	
2013	Geelong Amateur (4)	Colts competition run by AFL Barwon	Junior competition run by AFL Barwon	
2014	Torquay (6)	Colts competition run by AFL Barwon	Junior competition run by AFL Barwon	
2015	Torquay (7)	Colts competition run by AFL Barwon	Junior competition run by AFL Barwon	
2016	Torquay (8)	Colts competition run by AFL Barwon	Junior competition run by AFL Barwon	
2017	Geelong Amateur (5)	Colts competition run by AFL Barwon	Junior competition run by AFL Barwon	
2018	Torquay (9)	Under-19s competition run by AFL Barwon	Junior competition run by AFL Barwon	
2019	Modewarre (2)	Under-19s competition run by AFL Barwon	Junior competition run by AFL Barwon	
2020	Season cancelled due to COVID-19 pandemic			
2021	Season curtailed due to COVID-19 pandemic in Victoria			
2022	Torquay (10)	Under-18s competition run by AFL Barwon	Junior competition run by AFL Barwon	
2023	Geelong Amateur (6)	Under-18s competition run by AFL Barwon	Junior competition run by AFL Barwon	
2024	Torquay (11)	Under-18s competition run by AFL Barwon	Junior competition run by AFL Barwon	
2025	Geelong Amateur (7)	Under-18s competition run by AFL Barwon	Junior competition run by AFL Barwon	
2026	Queenscliff (3)	Under-18s competition run by AFL Barwon	Junior competition run by AFL Barwon	

=== A Grade netball ===
^{+}	Team also won the minor premiership for finishing on top of the ladder
^{^}	Player also won the league best and fairest award

Season	Premiers	Runners-up	Score	Venue	Best on court	Ref.
2011	Modewarre	Anglesea	41–37	Kardinia Park	Christine Graham (Modewarre)	
2012	Anglesea^{+}	Modewarre	62–39	Banyul-Warri Fields	Elle Rice (Anglesea)	
2013	Torquay	Modewarre	49–37	Kardinia Park	Courtney Cuolahan (Torquay)	
2014	Geelong Amateur^{+}	Torquay	33–30	Drysdale Recreation Reserve	Jenni Gardner (Geelong Amateur)	
2015	Geelong Amateur (2)	Torquay	36–29	Drysdale Recreation Reserve	Keisha Guilmartin (Geelong Amateur)	
2016	Torquay (2)	Geelong Amateur	31–30	Drysdale Recreation Reserve	Jessica Standfield (Torquay)	
2017	Modewarre (2)	Geelong Amateur	43–27	Drysdale Recreation Reserve	Kim Martin (Modewarre)	
2018	Modewarre^{+} (3)	Geelong Amateur	34–30	Drysdale Recreation Reserve	Jessica Kelly (Modewarre)	
2019	Torquay (3)	Geelong Amateur	38–25	Spring Creek Reserve	Courtney Cuolahan (2) (Torquay)	
2020	Season cancelled due to ongoing COVID-19 pandemic					
2021	Season curtailed due to ongoing COVID-19 pandemic in Victoria					
2022	Geelong Amateur (3)	Ocean Grove	60–48	Grinter Reserve	Keisha Guilmartin (2) (Geelong Amateur)	
2023	Ocean Grove	Geelong Amateur	53–45	Grinter Reserve	Ashton O'Brien (Ocean Grove)	
2024	Ocean Grove (2)	Geelong Amateur	53–48	Leopold Memorial Park	Emily Moroney (Ocean Grove)	
2025	Ocean Grove (3)	Geelong Amateur	53–52	Grinter Reserve	Kaitlyn Sheringham (Geelong Amateur)	
2026	Ocean Grove (4)	Geelong Amateur	51–50	Grinter Reserve	Amy Kennedy (Ocean Grove)	

== Individual awards ==
=== Senior football ===
==== Les Ash Medal ====
The Les Ash Medal, named after the late longtime Bellarine football administrator, is presented to the league's best and fairest player at the conclusion of the home-and-away season. It was first named after Ash in 1989; previously it was known simply as the Best and Fairest Medal. Two players have won the award on four occasions – Modewarre's Josh Finch, whose honours spanned seven seasons throughout the 2010s, and Torquay's James Darke, whose period of success overlapped with Finch to claim the award across nine seasons. Both Finch and Darke are also members of a group of five players who have won the award in consecutive seasons.

^{^}	Player also won the Leading Goalkicker Award

Table of recipients
Season	Player	Club	Votes	Ref.
1971	Stewart Mathieson	Winchelsea	[?]	
1972	Gary Renfrey	Portarlington	[?]	
1973	Dennis Johnson	Barwon Heads	[?]	
1974	Geoff Fry	Barwon Heads	[?]	
1975	Dennis Johnson (2)	Barwon Heads	[?]	
1976	Robert Warren	Queenscliff	[?]	
1977	Mike Birrell	Queenscliff	[?]	
1978	Mike Birrell (2)	Queenscliff	[?]	
1979	David Roe	Portarlington	[?]	
1980	Phil Stringer	Ocean Grove	[?]	
1981	John Fagan	Newcomb	[?]	
1982	David Roe (2)	Portarlington	[?]	
1983	Greg Scott	Drysdale	[?]	
1984	Greg Young	Anglesea	[?]	
1985	Phil Dennis	Portarlington	[?]	
1986	Mark Browne^{^}	Torquay	[?]	
1987	Brian O'Keefe	Anglesea	[?]	
1988	Dean McNeil	Queenscliff	[?]	
Award renamed to Les Ash Medal
1989	Chris Taylor	Drysdale	[?]	
1990	Chris Haddock	Torquay	[?]	
1991	Chris Haddock (2)	Torquay	[?]	
1992	Matt Walter	Barwon Heads	[?]	
1993	Jamie Dalton	Queenscliff	[?]	
1993	Paul Hudson	Newcomb	[?]	
1994	Geoff Taylor	Barwon Heads	[?]	
1995	Trevor Tucker	Ocean Grove	[?]	
1996	Paul Hudson (2)	Newcomb	[?]	
1997	Paul Hudson (3)	Newcomb	[?]	
1998	George Arnold	Torquay	[?]	
1999	Damian Clark	Ocean Grove	[?]	
2000	Mathew Payne	Ocean Grove	[?]	
2001	Mark Trevaskis	Geelong Amateur	[?]	
2002	Mark Hildebrandt	Barwon Heads	[?]	
2003	Matthew Primmer	Queenscliff	[?]	
2004	Simon Nelis	Drysdale	[?]	
2005	Russell Whiteford	Anglesea	[?]	
2006	James Dalton	Ocean Grove	[?]	
2007	Ricky O'Toole	Newcomb	[?]	
2008	Christian Robertson	Anglesea	[?]	
2009	Lindsay Smith	Geelong Amateur	[?]	
2010	Josh Finch	Modewarre	18	
2011	Dylan Chaplin-Burch	Queenscliff	21	
2012	Josh Finch (2)	Modewarre	24	
2013	Josh Finch (3)	Modewarre	30	
2014	James Darke	Torquay	23	
2015	Mitch Day^{^}	Geelong Amateur	24	
2016	Josh Finch (4)	Modewarre	22	
2017	James Darke (2)	Torquay	31	
2018	Jackson Bews	Anglesea	17	
2018	Mat Dyer	Barwon Heads	17	
2019	Dom Gleeson	Torquay	22	
2019	John Meesen	Modewarre	22	
2020	Not awarded			
2021	James Darke (3)	Torquay	20 (Note: Only 12 games were played due to the ongoing COVID-19 pandemic.)	
2022	James Darke (4)	Torquay	27	
2023	Luke Davis	Barwon Heads	20 (Note: Drysdale's Ben Fennell polled 22 votes to lead the count, but was ruled ineligible due to a reprimand he received for an incident in the Hawks' round 17 match against Torquay.)	
2024	Matt Boag	Torquay	26	
2025	Sammy Baker	Barwon Heads	18	
2025	Ben Fennell	Drysdale	18	
2026	Logan Wagener	Newcomb	31	

==== Stephen "Chooka" Piec Medal ====
The Stephen "Chooka" Piec Medal is presented to the player who has kicked the most goals at the conclusion of the home-and-away season. Previously known as the Leading Goalkicker Award, the medal was named in honour of Piec at the 2025 Ash Medal presentation night. Piec, described as "a poster boy for the Bellarine in its formative years", solely held the record for the most titles (four) until 2025, when Geelong Amateur's Mitch Day also won a fourth title upon his return to the BFNL following a stint with Lara. The magical century-mark of goals has been reached 14 times throughout the regular season. Dominant Torquay forward Wayne Tyquin's three-year run of 349 cumulative goals from 1997 to 1999 capped off a five-year consecutive period where the league had at least one centurion. Overlap between the Piec Medal and Ash Medal is rare; only two players (Torquay's Mark Browne in 1986 and Day in 2015) have collected both honours in the same season.

^{^}	Player also won the Les Ash Medal as the best and fairest in the league

Table of recipients
Season	Player	Club	Goals	Ref.
1971	Peter Harrison	Portarlington	51	
1972	Stephen "Chooka" Piec	Barwon Heads	90	
1973	Stephen "Chooka" Piec (2)	Barwon Heads	77	
1974	Stephen "Chooka" Piec (3)	Barwon Heads	57	
1975	Ray King	Portarlington	83	
1976	Stephen "Chooka" Piec (4)	Barwon Heads	68	
1977	Randell Whitten	Drysdale	114	
1978	Randell Whitten (2)	Drysdale	110	
1979	Tony Sudale	Newcomb	85	
1980	Gary Harriott	Anglesea	93	
1981	Tony Sudale (2)	Newcomb	77	
1982	Darrell Bissett	Portarlington	111	
1983	Gary Harriott (2)	Anglesea	91	
1984	Kevin Madden	Torquay	82	
1985	Mike Birrell	Queenscliff	114	
1986	Mark Browne^{^}	Torquay	83	
1987	Jim Kelly	Anglesea	100	
1988	Darrell Bissett (2)	Portarlington	59	
1989	Sean Kennedy	Drysdale	81	
1990	Phil Tagliabue	Leopold	66	
1991	Russell Mitchell	Drysdale	62	
1992	Greg Mighall	Portarlington	73	
1993	Darren Evans	Queenscliff	63	
1994	Stephen Smith	Anglesea	67	
1995	Adam Richardson	Ocean Grove	121	
1996	David Masek	Drysdale	108	
1997	Wayne Tyquin	Torquay	111	
1998	Wayne Tyquin (2)	Torquay	120	
1999	Wayne Tyquin (3)	Torquay	118	
2000	Luke Winter	Anglesea	75	
2001	Jamie Gladman	Queenscliff	78	
2002	Stuart Craven	Drysdale	63	
2003	Adam Richardson	Drysdale	110	
2004	Jamie Gladman	Queenscliff	78	
2005	Adam Skrobalak	Torquay	68	
2006	Adam Skrobalak (2)	Torquay	95	
2007	Sam Clark	Geelong Amateur	58	
2008	Lucas Murphy	Barwon Heads	102	
2009	Lucas Murphy (2)	Barwon Heads	92	
2010	Jason Tom	Geelong Amateur	67	
2011	Jason Tom (2)	Geelong Amateur	108	
2012	Scott Hughes	Torquay	91	
2013	Scott Hughes (2)	Torquay	97	
2014	Daniel DeGois	Queenscliff	95	
2015	Mitch Day^{^}	Geelong Amateur	106	
2016	Mitch Day (2)	Geelong Amateur	82	
2017	Mitch Day (3)	Geelong Amateur	70	
2018	Jordan Erskine	Anglesea	83	
2019	Jordan Erskine (2)	Anglesea	94	
2020	Not awarded			
2021	Lucas Anderson	Torquay	56	
2022	Mat Hebbard	Drysdale	87	
2023	Lucas Anderson (2)	Torquay	74	
2024	Jack Duke	Newcomb	71	
Award renamed to Stephen "Chooka" Piec Medal
2025	Mitch Day (4)	Geelong Amateur	69	
2026	Sam Lloyd	Geelong Amateur	100	

=== A Grade netball ===
==== Best & Fairest Award ====
Table of recipients
Season	Player	Club	Votes	Ref.
2011	Nikki Cooke	Drysdale	24	
2012	Sarah O'Connor	Modewarre	27	
2013	Rochelle Godfrey	Queenscliff	28	
2014	Ashlea Salter	Geelong Amateur	27	
2015	Sarah Gunning	Modewarre	23	
2016	Hannah Kennedy	Drysdale	28	
2017	Olivia Wilson	Barwon Heads	29	
2018	Kelsey Ollis	Ocean Grove	27	
2019	Ashlea Salter (2)	Geelong Amateur	36	
2020	Not awarded			
2021	Jessica Standfield	Torquay	12	
2022	Kaitlin Gladman	Queenscliff	32	
2023	Kaitlin Gladman (2)	Queenscliff	35	
2024	Kiralee Collings	Torquay	27	
2024	Jess Duke	Newcomb	27	
2025	Ebony Rolph	Queenscliff	31	
2026	Bec Winch	Geelong Amateur	30	

==== Hot Shot Award ====
Table of recipients
Season	Player	Club	Goals	Ref.
2011	Errin Schaeffer	Newcomb	621	
2012	Elle Rice	Anglesea	660	
2013	Candice Bull	Portarlington	651	
2014	Candice Bull (2)	Portarlington	[?]	
2015	Amy Vogels	Torquay	589	
2016	Monique Adams	Barwon Heads	452	
2017	Kim Martin	Modewarre	629	
2018	Monique Adams (2)	Barwon Heads	594	
2019	Rebecca Scott	Ocean Grove	697	
2020	Not awarded			
2021	Ruby Watson	Geelong Amateur	531	
2022	Rebecca O'Neill (2)	Ocean Grove	831	
2023	Ruby Watson (2)	Geelong Amateur	1,064	
2024	Ruby Watson (3)	Geelong Amateur	852	
2025	Carly Sanders	Newcomb	638	
2026	Elisa Hall	Surf Coast	647	

== Bibliography ==
- Cat Country – History of Football In The Geelong Region – John Stoward – ISBN 9780957751583
