= Ocean Grove Football and Netball Club =

Ocean Grove

Names
- Full name: Ocean Grove Football and Netball Club
- Nickname: Grubbers

Club details
- Founded: 1964; 62 years ago
- Colours
- Competition: Bellarine Football League
- Premierships: 8 (1994, 1995, 1996, 1997, 2000, 2001, 2002, 2003)
- Ground: Ray Menzies Memorial Reserve

Uniforms
Home

Other information
- Official website: ogfnc.com.au

The Ocean Grove Football and Netball Club, nicknamed the Grubbers, is an Australian rules football and netball club that plays in the Bellarine Football League (BFL) and situated in the town of Ocean Grove, Victoria.

== History ==
The club started off in the 1960s as a joint club between Barwon Heads and Ocean Grove. The Barwon Heads/Ocean Grove Football Club wore purple jumpers with gold trim and were, and still are known as the "Grubbers". Ray Menzies was a founding member of the club and also the Bellarine Football League; the nearby Ray Menzies Memorial Reserve was named in his honour.

Years later, the club broke into the Barwon Heads Football Club and the Ocean Grove Football and Netball Club. The newly established club wore white jumpers with a red V, similar to the old South Melbourne jumpers. The current strip is a red jumper with a white OGFC monogram on the front, red shorts and red and white hooped socks, white shorts for away games. The origin of the nickname "Grubbers" is unknown, but may have come from a major road in the area (Grubb Road) or could also be reference to a swan.

The club has won eight premierships in the Bellarine Football League at senior level. This was achieved in two sequences of four-in-a-row, which in turn came from a sequence of twelve consecutive Grand Final appearances.

The Ocean Grove Football Club also fields a reserves team and under 19s team in the BFL, an under 17s in the Geelong Junior Football League. The club also have a junior "feeder" club, with the Ocean Grove Cobras Football Club, fielding under 15s, under 13s and under 10s teams.

In October 2006 a number of players from the club assaulted a Jewish man while they were on a club trip. In 2007 3 players from the Ocean Grove Football Club were found guilty by the Melbourne Magistrates Court for their part in an anti-Semitic remark on a father who was with his two young children. Criminal convictions were recorded against one man and two others who pleaded guilty were fined, while the player who punched the father in the face was never identified. In November 2007 Melbourne writer and social commentator Christopher Bantick in his column in the Herald Sun wrote that "the club is deserving of public shame".

== Premierships ==
- Bellarine Football League (8): 1994, 1995, 1996, 1997, 2000, 2001, 2002, 2003

== Notable club members ==
The club's two premiership coaches, Brendan McCartney (who won the 1994–1997 flags) and Mark Neeld (who won the 2000–2003 flags), both went on to senior coaching jobs in the Australian Football League, with the Western Bulldogs and Melbourne respectively. Coincidentally, both men were appointed to their senior coaching jobs in the same week at the end of the 2011 AFL season. Neeld coached Melbourne from 2012 until the middle of 2013, and McCartney coached the Bulldogs from 2012 until the end of 2014.

== AFL players ==
As of 2009, six players have made it from the Grubbers up to AFL level:

- Darren Denneman (Geelong, Sydney Swans)
- Clint Bartram (Melbourne)
- Jordan Jones (West Coast)
- Danny Stanley (Collingwood)
- Ayce Cordy (Western Bulldogs)
- Guy O'Keefe (Western Bulldogs)

== Bibliography ==
- Cat Country: History of Football in the Geelong Region by John Stoward – Aussie Footy Books, 2008 – ISBN 9780957751583
