= Bellarine Highway =

Highway in Victoria, Australia

Bellarine Highway Victoria
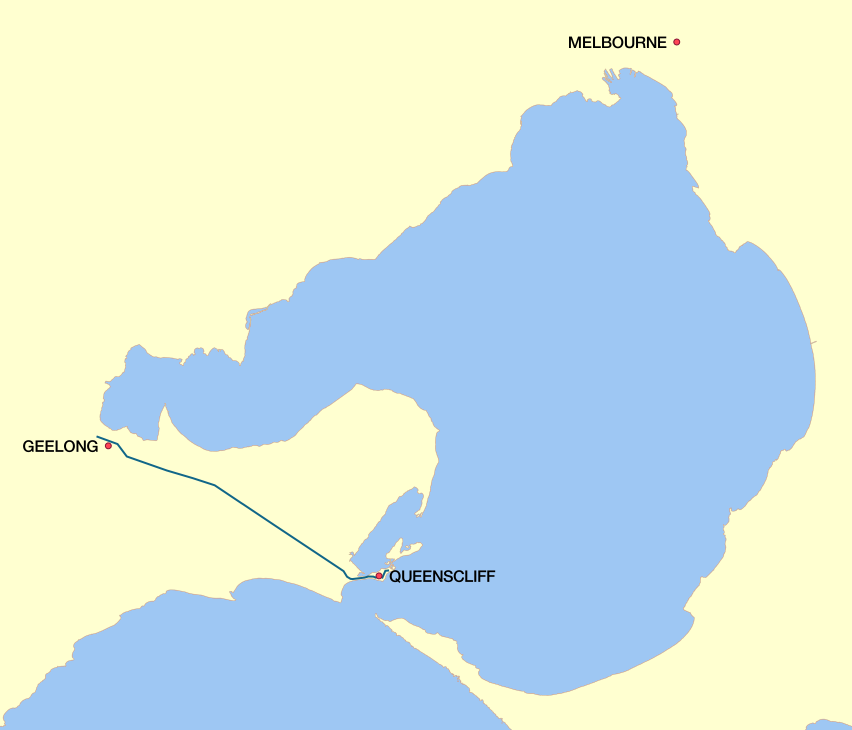
- Map of Bellarine Highway, south-west of Port Phillip Bay
- Coordinates: 38.151716°S 144.351874°E (West end); 38.265603°S 144.672427°E (East end)

General information
- Type: Highway
- Length: 32.5 km (20 mi)
- Gazetted: March 1914 (as Main Road); 1947/8 (as State Highway)
- Route number(s): B110 (1998–present); Entire route (via McKillop Street)
- Former route number: State Route 91 (1986–1998); Entire route (via Ryrie Street)

Major junctions
- West end: Princes Highway; Geelong, Victoria
- Grubb Road; Point Lonsdale Road
- East end: Wharf Street East; Queenscliff, Victoria

Location(s)
- Major settlements: Thomson, Newcomb, Moolap, Leopold, Wallington, Point Lonsdale

Highway system
- Highways in Australia; National Highway • Freeways in Australia; Highways in Victoria

Bellarine Highway is a main arterial highway that runs east from Geelong in Victoria along the Bellarine Peninsula to Queenscliff. The highway also provides the main route to Barwon Heads and Ocean Grove, localities along the southern coast of the peninsula.

== Route ==
Bellarine Highway begins at the intersection of Latrobe Terrace and McKillop Street on the western edge of central Geelong. As McKillop Street, it runs east as a four-lane, dual-carriageway road through Geelong, where it eventually intersects with and changes its name to Ormond Road, running south-east until the intersection with Boundary Road on the eastern edge of central Geelong. It then changes its name to Bellarine Highway in its own right and progressively heads south-east through Leopold. It eventually meets Grubb Road in Wallington, where it narrows to a dual-lane, single-carriageway road past Point Lonsdale. The highway eventually ends at Wharf Street East, Queenscliff, where it meets the Searoad Ferries passenger and motor vehicle ferry which operates across Port Phillip Bay to Sorrento on the Mornington Peninsula.

== History ==
The passing of the Country Roads Act 1912 through the Parliament of Victoria provided for the establishment of the Country Roads Board and its ability to declare Main Roads, taking responsibility for the management, construction and care of the state's major roads from local municipalities. Geelong-Queenscliff Road from Geelong to Queenscliff was declared a Main Road on 16 March 1914.

The passing of the Highways and Vehicles Act 1924 provided for the declaration of State Highways, roads two-thirds financed by the state government through the Country Roads Board. Bellarine Highway was declared a State Highway in the 1947/48 financial year, from Geelong to Queenscliff (for a total of 20 miles), subsuming the original declaration of Geelong-Queenscliff Road as a Main Road. It was named after the Bellarine Peninsula.

Bellarine Highway was signed as State Route 91 between Geelong and Queenscliff in 1986; with Victoria's conversion to the newer alphanumeric system in the late 1990s, this was replaced by route B110, which continues on the other side of the bay at Sorrento to run along Point Nepean Road until Mornington. The Geelong end of the highway originally ran along Ryrie Street in the Geelong city centre, but was relocated a number of blocks south to McKillop Street to remove heavy trucks from the shopping district in October 1997.

The passing of the Road Management Act 2004 granted the responsibility of overall management and development of Victoria's major arterial roads to VicRoads: in 2006, VicRoads re-declared the road as Bellarine Highway (Arterial #6730), beginning at Latrobe Terrace at Geelong and ending at the end of the Bellarine Peninsula in Queenscliff.

== Major intersections ==
LGA	Location	km	mi	Destinations	Notes
Greater Geelong	Geelong	0.0	0.0	Latrobe Terrace (A10/Tourist Route 21) – Melbourne, Avalon, Colac	Western terminus of highway (as McKillop Street) and route B110
Greater Geelong	East Geelong	2.1	1.3	Ormond Street (northwest) – Central Geelong; McKillop Street (east) – East Geelong	Eastbound traffic turns southeast onto Ormond Street, westbound traffic turns west onto McKillop Street
Greater Geelong	Thomson–Newcomb–East Geelong tripoint	3.6	2.2	Boundary Road (C124) – Belmont, Grovedale, Whittington	Eastbound traffic continues east onto Bellarine Highway, westbound traffic continues northwest onto Ormond Street
Greater Geelong	Wallington	18.9	11.7	Grubb Road (C129) – Drysdale, Ocean Grove, Barwon Heads	Roundabout
Queenscliffe	Point Lonsdale	25.9	16.1	Portarlington–Queenscliff Road (C126) – Portarlington	
Queenscliffe	Point Lonsdale–Queenscliff boundary	27.8	17.3	Point Lonsdale Road (C127) – Point Lonsdale	Roundabout
Queenscliffe	Queenscliff	32.5	20.2	Wharf Street East	Eastern terminus of highway Route B110 continues via Queenscliff–Sorrento Ferry to Point Nepean Road, Sorrento
1.000 mi = 1.609 km; 1.000 km = 0.621 mi: Route transition

== See also ==
- Highways in Australia
- Highways in Victoria
