= Geelong High School =

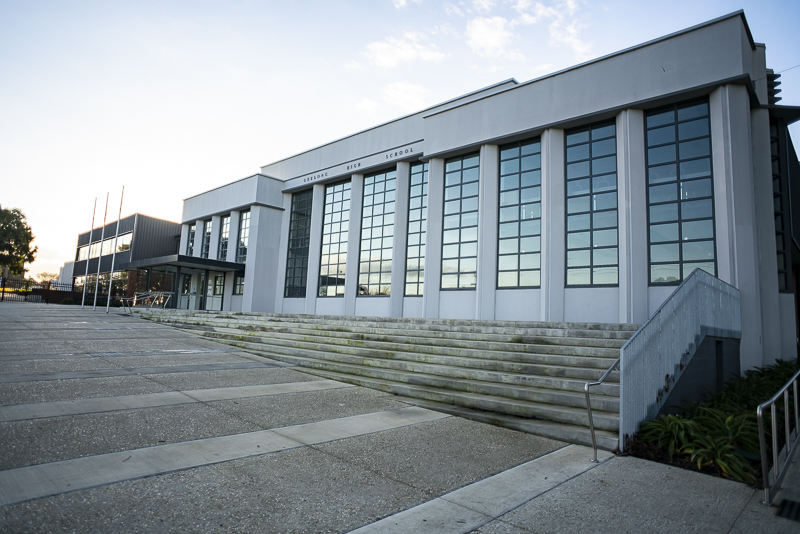
- Front entrance, 2021

Location
- East Geelong, Victoria; Australia; 38.1528°S 144.3738°E

Information
- Type: Public, co-educational, high school
- Motto: Vitae nos parat (It prepares us for life)
- Established: 1910
- Principal: Davin Reid
- Staff: 89 (68 teaching, 21 non-teaching)
- Grades: 7–12
- Enrolment: 893
- Campus: Suburban
- Colours: Navy blue, maroon and gold
- Nickname: GHS
- Website: www.geelonghigh.vic.edu.au

Geelong High School is a co-educational, public, secondary school located in East Geelong, Victoria, Australia. The school opened in 1910, making it one of Victoria's oldest state secondary schools, and it moved to its present site in 1915. The current principal is Davin Reid.

The school is situated on the corner of Garden and Ryrie Streets, and backs onto Eastern Gardens, home of the Geelong Botanical Gardens. Both Eastern Beach and the centre of Geelong are within easy walking distance. Geelong High accommodates students in Years 7–12 and has an enrolment of about 950.

== History ==
On 8 February 1910, 79 students, together with eight teachers and an acting headmaster, began classes in a couple of disused rooms at the Gordon Institute of TAFE. John William Gray was appointed headmaster in April 1910. Twelve months later, enrolment had increased to 150, and 12 rooms were being used at the Gordon. The school was renamed the Geelong High School and, as such, became Geelong's first state secondary school. The current site was selected in East Geelong, on the southwest corner of Eastern Park, and the new school, to accommodate 450 students, was completed in August 1915.

In 2005 and 2006, the school underwent some major reconstruction, providing new woodwork and metalwork studios, science labs and computer pods, and a new gymnasium and library, in addition to a learning centre with a computer pod, classrooms and a theatrette. The work was done to accommodate Year 7 students and assist them in their learning.

In an audit conducted by the Victorian state government, Geelong High School was identified as one of the 50 "most needy schools" in Victoria. That led to students sending letters to MHR for Corio, Richard Marles, as well as other politicians, mentioning "teachers and students working in classrooms with cracked walls, substandard heating and no cooling", and pleading for funding to fix and upgrade the school.

In 2014, the school received funding for a rebuild. The upgrade involved the refurbishment of the school hall, the construction of a new two-storey Year 7 building in the Year 7 area, and the construction of new music and dance studio, in 2017. During 2018, rooms 3–8 were demolished to make way for the new Year 7 courtyard, the Kroger Wing was refurbished, including the addition of a second storey. 2019 saw the refurbishment of the Vague Wing to create new art rooms, the refurbishment of the top floor of Winstanley Wing for new Year 12 classrooms, and the demolition of the 1970s office building. All portable classrooms were removed by 2020.

The refurbished C.A. Love Hall (originally opened in 1970), and dance and music studios, were completed in March 2018. While the Kroger Wing was closed for reconstruction, the school lost 17 classrooms but gained seven in the new building. As a result of that, the old dance and music rooms at Shenton, on the other side of Garden Street, were divided up into four new classrooms.

The School currently consists of the following buildings:

- The main Kroger Wing: centre section (rooms 1, 2, 9, 11, 11a, 12, 13 & 14) opened in 1915, with a 1918 extension (rooms 3, 4, 5, 6, 7 8), a two-storey front (rooms 10 & 10A, staffroom) opened in 1942, a VCE study centre, and administration offices, both opened in the 1970s.
- The Winstanley Wing was built in the 1960s, originally housing science and home economics classrooms, and now has cooking and art rooms. It was refurbished in 2014. (Rooms 17, 18, 19, 21, 22 & 23)
- The R.J. Vague Wing opened in 1979 and refurbished in 2006. It now contains the library and Year 7 Learning Centre (rooms L1, L2, L3, L4, 26 & 27)
- The science wing and gym (rooms S1, S2, S3, S4 & S5), opened in 2005.
- The wood and metalwork rooms (rooms 32 and 33), opened in 2004.
- Various portable classrooms (rooms 34, 35, 36, 36A, 37, 38, 39, 40, 41, 42 & 43), were installed over the past 10 years.

== Curriculum ==
Geelong High School operates a Year 7 program which is independent of the main curriculum structure. Year 7 students are situated in groups, each with two teachers who cover science and maths, and English and humanities. The program is designed to help students better manage their transition from primary to secondary education.

In 2003 the school introduced the ILP programme, in which students in Years 8–10 can choose their subjects.

In 2008 the school commenced teaching the Japanese language to Year 7 students, later extended to all years. The language was introduced as a replacement for Korean as a LOTE subject, which had been taught since the mid-1990s but was removed from the school curriculum at the end of 2006. The school previously offered German as a LOTE subject.

Geelong High school offers a number of senior study pathways for Year 10, 11 and 12 students, including Victorian Certificate of Education (VCE), Victorian Certificate of Applied Learning (VCAL) and Vocational Education and Training (VET).

=== Vocational Education and Training ===
VET, as part of the VCE program, combines a student's general studies with vocational ones in Year 10, 11 or 12. The aim is to give participating students an advantage when applying for full-time apprenticeships in trade areas. Geelong High School teaches in VET Information Technology as well as VET Dance.

=== School-based apprenticeships ===
Students in Years 10 and 11 have the opportunity to undertake part-time traineeships which include paid work placements and the opportunity to complete VET studies in each student's chosen area.

== Extra-curricular ==
=== Performing arts ===
==== Drama ====
During 1994, the school purchased some former church buildings on the corner of Ryrie and Garden Streets, and converted them into what is now the Shenton Performing Arts Centre. This complex hosts a fully equipped theatre, in addition to music classrooms, dance studios and performance spaces.

==== Music ====
Geelong High School offers Classroom Music and an Instrumental Music program to its students. Classroom Music is offered through the ILP program.

==== Dance ====
The VET course Certificate II in Dance is offered to provide students with the skills, knowledge, and attitudes to establish a career in dancing. As part of their assessment, all first and second year VET students annually perform their own group compositional ensemble piece in the Splash Dance festival showcase at the Geelong Performing Arts Centre. The school offers this course to all other students in Geelong.

=== Artist in residence ===
In 2002 the school was involved in the Artists in Schools program, under which an artist in residence helped students make their own books while also learning more about their city.

=== Sport ===
The sports the school offers include cricket, baseball, softball, tennis, volleyball, golf, football, hockey, soccer, basketball, netball, table tennis, and badminton.

=== Student exchange ===
Geelong High School offers language studies in Japanese and until 2022, German, with an established exchange program in both of those languages, giving students the opportunity to visit and live with families in these respective countries for a period of time.

== Notable alumni ==
- Ernie Bond – politician
- Prof. John Walter Cherry – theatre director, foundation professor of drama at Flinders University, and Professor of Theatre at Temple University, Philadelphia
- James Grant – author, Anglican priest, fellow of Trinity College (University of Melbourne), dean of St Paul's Cathedral, Melbourne
- Geoff Howard – Former ALP state politician. MLA for Ballarat East 1999–2014, and Buninyong 2014–2018. Parliamentary Secretary, Natural Resources and Environment 1999–2002, Parliamentary Secretary, Agriculture 2002–2006
- Jill Jolliffe - journalist and author
- Rod Mackenzie – state politician; MLC for Geelong 1979–1992; President, Legislative Council 1985–88; Minister of Soldier Settlement April–December 1982; Minister of Forests and Minister of Lands 1982–83; Minister of Conservation, Forests and Lands 1983–85
- Fred Mendelsohn - medical researcher and former director of the Howard Florey Institute
- Lee Troop – Olympic marathon runner
- Mark Wilson – bass player in the band Jet
- Ian Trezise – Former ALP state politician. Member for Geelong 1999–2014
- Garry Davidson – VFL football player for the Geelong Football Club
- Spiro Malakellis – AFL football player for the Geelong Football Club
- Jed Bews – AFL football player for the Geelong Football Club
- Devon Smith – AFL Footballer

== Controversies ==
In 2009, the discovery of broken asbestos-cement sheeting in the school hall was publicised in the local media. The problem has since been resolved.
