= Bervin Ellis Purnell =

Bervin Ellis Purnell MBE JP (10 March 1891 – 5 May 1972) was mayor and councillor of the City of Geelong, Australia.

Purnell was the second of seven children of Charles William Purnell (1854–1931) and Ellen McNair (c. 1862–1939). Purnell attended Flinders State School in Geelong, where he enjoyed running around the block. From here the young Purnell developed an interest in athletics.

As a book keeper in his father's furniture business from 1905 to 1917, it was natural that the young Purnell would be the Geelong Presbyterian Guild Harriers Athletic Club's first treasurer. He combined this with the secretary's job and was instrumental in founding the Guild Harriers through the Geelong Presbyterian Guild group.

After the Guild folded in 1913, Purnell continued his athletic interests through membership of the Hawthorn Harriers in Melbourne. In early 1917 Purnell enlisted in the Australian Flying Corps and married prior to sailing for England. Purnell was an Air Mechanic 1st Class and served in the spare parts storeroom at Salisbury Plain. Following the end of the war, Purnell spent over six months with Waring & Gillow, a noted furniture firm in London, during 1919. Purnell returned to Australia in late 1919 and resumed his manager's position at his father's firm in 1920.

After the war Purnell, former club president David F. Griffiths (died 1941) and others; encouraged by the successes of the Christ Church club (Geelong City AC); restored the Geelong Guild Athletic Club. Purnell returned as the Guild club's secretary and treasurer and remained in those positions until the early 1950s.

Purnell married May Violet Sandford (1896–1975) in 1917. They never had children. In 1924 they purchased a house in Meakin Street, East Geelong, where many Guild committee meeting were held.

Purnell was Guild secretary/treasurer then president, as well as team manager of the Guild's early cross country teams competing in the Melbourne Victorian Amateur Athletic Association's (V.A.A.A.) winter competitions.

Purnell unsuccessfully stood for V.A.A.A. council in the 1930s as a handicapper. However, in 1935 he was elected as one of the V.A.A.A.'s eleven vice presidents. Purnell would continue as a V.A.A.A. vice president until 1938.

As a prominent Geelong businessman, Purnell served as a Geelong city councillor from 1940 to 1963 and Geelong Mayor from 1949 to 1952. In the lead up to the 1952 Olympic Games, Purnell helped secure John Landy's place in the Olympic team through a silent fundraising campaign, as the Australian Olympic Committee had not approved Landy's place in the team through lack of funds. The same year, Purnell also supported Russell Mockridge's Olympic cycling bid, by underwriting a fidelity bond for his amateur status. Mockridge duly won two gold medals.

Purnell was recognised for his civic duties with an MBE in the New Years Honors on 1 January 1954. In 1957 he built a new factory at North Geelong in addition to recognising the six Geelong Guild Athletic Club Olympians, whilst guiding the Geelong Guild to finding a new permanent home, in Geelong.

In 1960, the Purnell furniture business (which had included contracts for furniture at Old Parliament House in Canberra) closed, due in part to Purnell's ongoing illness and old age. On 29 March 1963 (19 days after his 72nd birthday) Purnell was defeated at election for the Presidency of the club he founded 55 years earlier and was succeeded by a young Rudi Hochreiter Snr (1926–2006) for one year. Club veteran W.J.P. "Bill" Wood (1907–1990) then became president until 1970.

Bervin Purnell died aged 81 and is buried at the Geelong Eastern Cemetery.

Papers relating to Purnell's time as councillor are held in the Geelong heritage centre archives.

Preceded by new title	Secretary; 13 July 1908 – 9 April 1910	Succeeded by Edgar Deans
Preceded by Edgar Deans	Secretary; 6 April 1911 – 9 May 1913	Succeeded by Bervin E. Purnell
Preceded by Bervin E. Purnell	Secretary; April 1920 – 1955	Succeeded by Jim Bryce
Preceded by new title	Treasurer; 13 July 1908 – 6 April 1911	Succeeded by A.V. Muir
Preceded by Ivo Scott	Treasurer; April 1920 – 5 April 1957	Succeeded by Ray Mills
Government offices
Preceded by to be advised	Mayor of Geelong; 1949–1952	Succeeded by Morris Jacobs
