= Anne Drysdale =

Scottish squatter in colonial Australia

- Born: Anne Drysdale; August 26, 1792; Fife, Scotland
- Died: November 2, 1853 (aged 61); Coriyule Homestead
- Known for: Town of Drysdale, Victoria is named after her

Anne Drysdale (26 August 1792 - 11 May 1853) was a pioneer squatter for whom Drysdale, Victoria, is named.

== Early life ==
Anne Drysdale was born on 26 August 1792, the daughter of William Drysdale of Pitteuchar, Fife, Scotland, town clerk of Kirkcaldy, and Anne Currison, daughter of the town clerk of Hamilton.

== Pioneer life ==
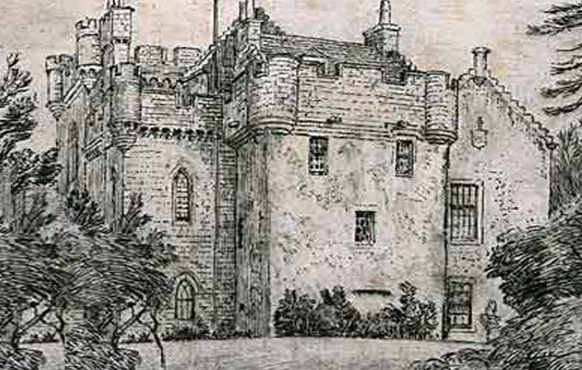
Craufurdland Castle

She initially had a farm in Ayrshire, Scotland, on her own account, and lived with the Houison Craufurd family in their Craufurdland Castle. She later decided, for health reasons, to emigrate to Port Phillip. Drysdale arrived at Port Phillip on 15 March 1840, and soon after became a guest of Dr Alexander Thomson and his family in Geelong. He had offered to help her and find a run. She and Caroline Elizabeth Newcomb (1812-1874), also a recent immigrant, became friends and, when Anne decided on Boronggoop as the site for her run, they also became partners. Anne was an experienced farmer and twenty years senior to Caroline. A cottage was built for them, the Armstrong family and others entered their employ, and a home was established.

Drysdale was a devout Presbyterian who often attended chapel on a Sunday morning then as the householder, held a service in the evening and "read a sermon" to her male employees. To "read a sermon" in colonial Australia meant leading a prayer service and reading aloud a sermon from a book for a family or household or any group where a minister was unavailable. For example in her diary, Drysdale refers to the ship's captain or doctor being responsible for reading a sermon on the journey to Australia.

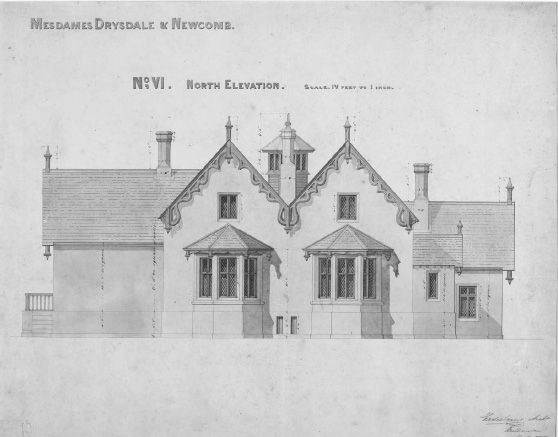
Coryule, built for Anne Drysdale and Caroline Elizabeth Newcomb

As Boronggoop was held by licence, Drysdale was anxious to own a freehold property. By 1843 they had established an outstation, Lap Lap, on Reedy Lake, and had heard of the run Coryule, near modern Drysdale. On 18 July they settled the sale of the property from Mr. Austin and by the late 1840s they were living there in the stone house Coryule, overlooking Port Phillip Bay, built by Melbourne architect, Charles Laing.

In June 1852, Anne Drysdale had a stroke and, eventually died as a result on 11 May 1853. Newcomb inherited the property.

Newcomb died in 1874 and was buried beside Anne Drysdale at Coryule; their remains were later moved to the Geelong Eastern Cemetery.

Drysdale Circuit in the Canberra suburb of Kambah is named in her honour.
