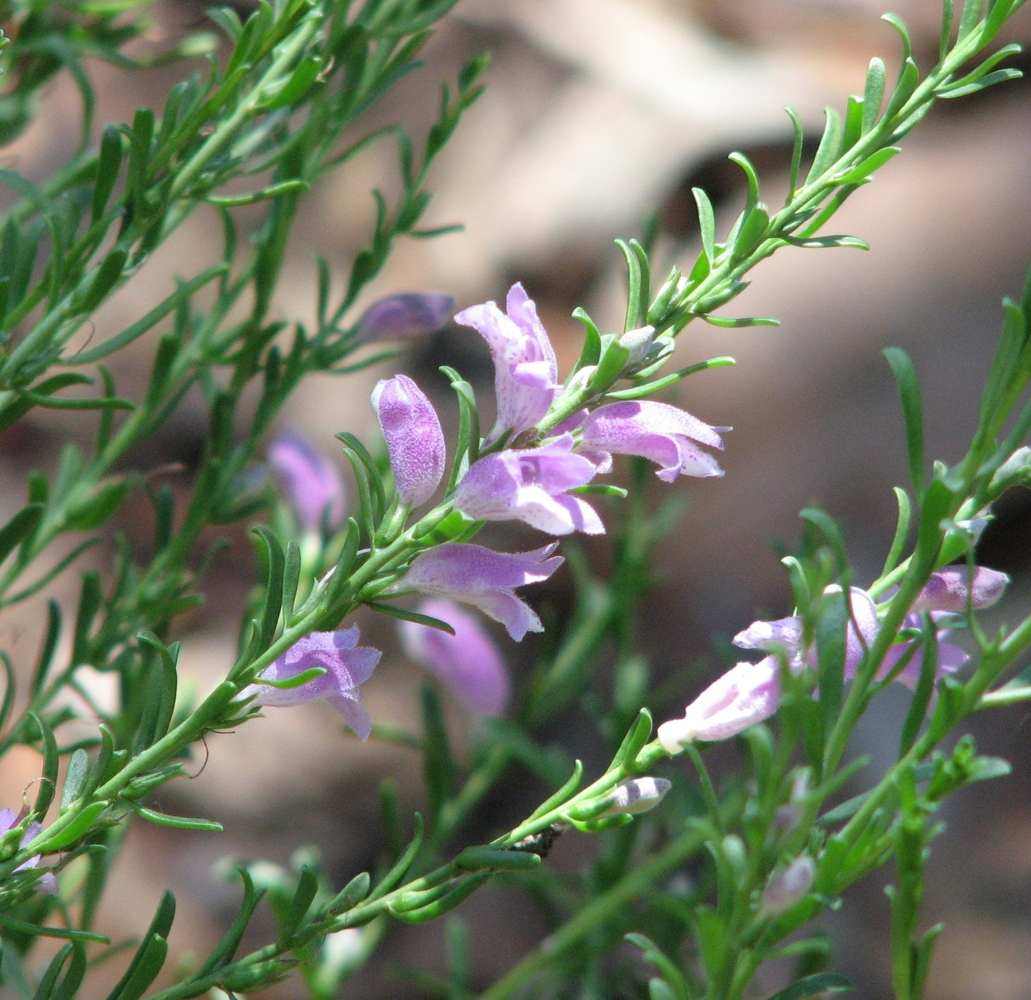
- Eremophila laanii in Geelong Botanic Gardens

Scientific classification
- Kingdom: Plantae
- Clade: Embryophytes
- Clade: Tracheophytes
- Clade: Spermatophytes
- Clade: Angiosperms
- Clade: Eudicots
- Clade: Asterids
- Order: Lamiales
- Family: Scrophulariaceae
- Genus: Eremophila
- Species: E. laanii

Binomial name
- Eremophila laanii F.Muell.

Synonyms
- Pholidia laanii (F.Muell) Kraenzl.

= Eremophila laanii =

Species of plant endemic to Western Australia

Eremophila laanii is a flowering plant in the figwort family, Scrophulariaceae and is endemic to Western Australia. It is a shrub or small tree with many tangled branches and flowers in a number of colour forms. It seems to be mostly restricted to the upper reaches of the beds and nearby flats of two rivers.

== Description ==
Eremophila laanii is a shrub or small tree usually growing to a height of 1–3 m (3–10 ft), sometimes twice as high which sometimes produces suckers. Its branches are spreading or drooping and are covered with a dense layer of fine hairs. The leaves are linear to elliptic in shape, mostly 26–40 mm (1–2 in) long, 2–7 mm (0.08–0.3 in) wide, sometimes glabrous, sometimes covered with fine hairs.

The flowers are borne singly in leaf axils on a hairy stalk 3–6 mm (0.1–0.2 in) long and are usually clustered near the ends of the branches. There are 5 green, egg-shaped, tapering sepals which are mostly 7.5–10.5 mm (0.3–0.4 in) long, glabrous on the outer surface but hairy on the inside. The petals are 20–30 mm (0.8–1 in) long and are joined at their lower end to form a tube. The petal tube is sometimes pink to red with pink spots on a light colour inside the tube, or cream and without spots. The petal tube is mostly glabrous except that the inside of the tube is filled with long, soft hairs. The 4 stamens extend beyond the end of the petal tube. Flowering occurs from June to December and is followed by woody, oval-shaped to top-shaped fruits with a pointed end and which are 8–10 mm (0.3–0.4 in) long and have a thin, papery covering.

== Taxonomy ==
The species was first formally described in 1884 by botanist Ferdinand von Mueller and the description was published in Australasian Chemist and Druggist.The type specimen was collected on the Upper Murchison River, near Mount Hale, by Charles Crossland. The specific epithet (laanii) honours Dr van der Laan, a 19th-century Dutch promoter of scientific research.

== Distribution and habitat ==
Eremophila laanii occurs on clay or sandy clay soils on floodplains and riverbanks along the upper reaches of the Murchison and Gascoyne Rivers in the Carnarvon, Gascoyne, Geraldton Sandplains, Murchison and Yalgoo biogeographic regions. It can reproduce by root suckering and often forms dense thickets.

== Conservation status ==
This species is classified as "not threatened" by the Western Australian Government Department of Parks and Wildlife.

== Use in horticulture ==
This eremophila is well known in cultivation. It is a large, tough shrub and is suitable for large gardens where there is little competition and it can be used as a screening plant. It is most easily grown from cuttings or from its root suckers and grows in most soils, especially heavy clay. It grows naturally near rivers and although drought resistant, flowers profusely after a deep watering. It is also frost tolerant but needs to occasionally be heavily pruned in order to maintain its shape and to remove dead wood.
