= Geelong Eastern Cemetery =

Cemetery in Victoria, Australia

- Interactive map of Geelong Eastern Cemetery

Details
- Established: 1839
- Location: East Geelong, Victoria
- Country: Australia
- Coordinates: 38.1632°S 144.3824°E
- No. of interments: >70,000
- Website: Geelong Eastern Cemetery
- Find a Grave: Geelong Eastern Cemetery
- Footnotes: Geelong Eastern Cemetery – Billion Graves

Geelong Eastern Cemetery is a cemetery located in the city of Geelong, Victoria in Australia. The cemetery dates back to 1839.

141 Ormond Road, The Eastern Cemetery Gatehouse is listed on the Victorian Heritage Register.

== Notable interments ==
- Thomas Austin, member of the Acclimatisation Society of Victoria
- Percy Ellingsen, Australian Rules footballer
- James Harrison, engineer and politician
- Howard Hitchcock, organised construction of the Great Ocean Road
- Bervin Ellis Purnell, Mayor of Geelong
- Bransby Cooper, Cricketer – Played in the first ever Test Match
- Anne Drysdale, from whom Drysdale, Victoria, is named
- Caroline Elizabeth Newcomb, woman pioneer squatter, partner of Anne Drysdale
- Catherine McDonald née Potaskie, first European born in Tasmania
- Robert Beauchamp, Australasian Mission President of the Church of Jesus Christ of Latter-day Saints and one of the earliest LDS missionaries to New Zealand

== War graves ==
The cemetery contains the war graves of 45 Commonwealth service personnel. There are 9 from World War I and 36 from World War II.
