= Sam McIntosh =

Australian Paralympic athlete (born 1990)

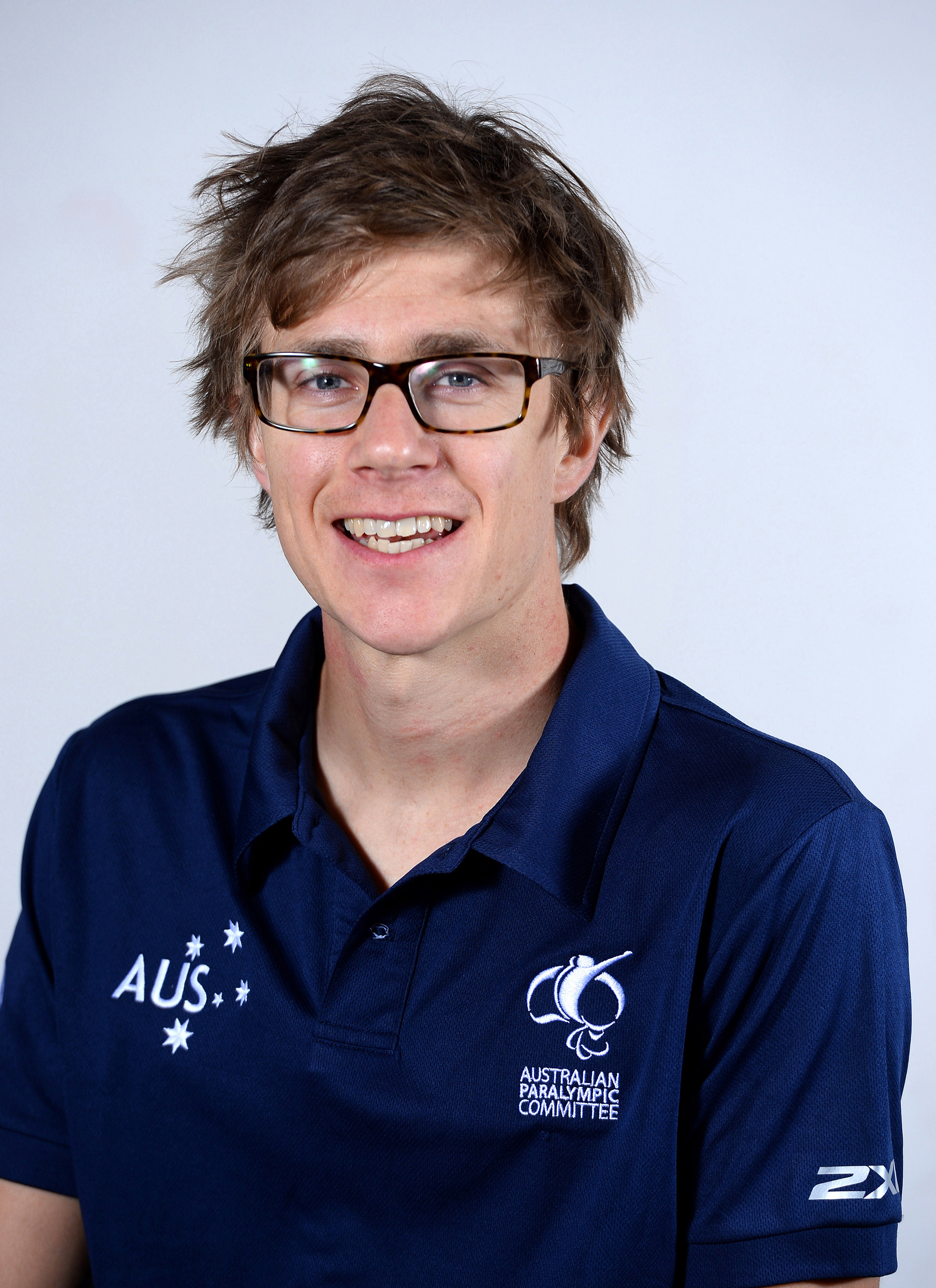
- 2016 Australian Paralympic team portrait of McIntosh

Personal information
- Full name: Samuel McIntosh
- Nicknames: Mallo, Quadzilla, Quadzilla Sam
- Nationality: Australian
- Born: 13 July 1990 (age 36) Drysdale, Victoria
- Website: SamMcIntosh.com

Sport
- Country: Australia
- Sport: Paralympic athletics
- Events: 100 metre, 200 metre and 400 metre
- Turned pro: 2011
- Coached by: Fred Periac

Achievements and titles
- Paralympic finals: 2012, 2016, 2020
- World finals: 2011, 2015, 2017, 2019, 2023
- Personal bests: 16.89 (100 metre), 32.02 (200 metre) 64.08 (400 metre)

Samuel McIntosh (born 13 July 1990) is an Australian Paralympic athlete who races in the T52 100m, 200m, and 400m events. He holds 3 Australian National Records and 2 Oceania Records. He represented Australia at the 2012 London Paralympic Games, 2016 Rio Paralympics, 2020 Tokyo Paralympics and the 2024 Paris Paralympics in athletics as well as the 2011, 2015, 2017, 2019 and 2023 Para Athletic World Championships.

== Early life ==
McIntosh was born on 13 July 1990 in Geelong, the youngest of three children to Glenn and Jenny McIntosh. He attended St. Thomas Primary School in Drysdale. In his youth, Sam showed an interest in individual sports and activities, such as swimming, karate, and BMX bike riding. Sam swam at the state level and at the Victorian Country LC Championships. Sam graduated with a VCE from Saint Ignatius College Geelong in 2008 after returning to school post-accident.

== The Accident ==
In 2007, while riding a BMX bike on a family holiday in Coffs Harbour, he had an accident that left him a C6 quadriplegic.

While in rehabilitation, he was visited by a school friend's sister, fellow Paralympian, Jemima Moore, who encouraged him to explore para sport. Following his accident, he initially played wheelchair rugby.

On 31 December 2011, on a dance floor, his neck was broken for a second time. He spent two weeks in hospital and three months doing rehabilitation before he was able to continue his athletics career. With six months between him and the 2012 London Paralympics, Sam was determined to recover, get back to training and represent his county. He succeeded.

== Athletics ==
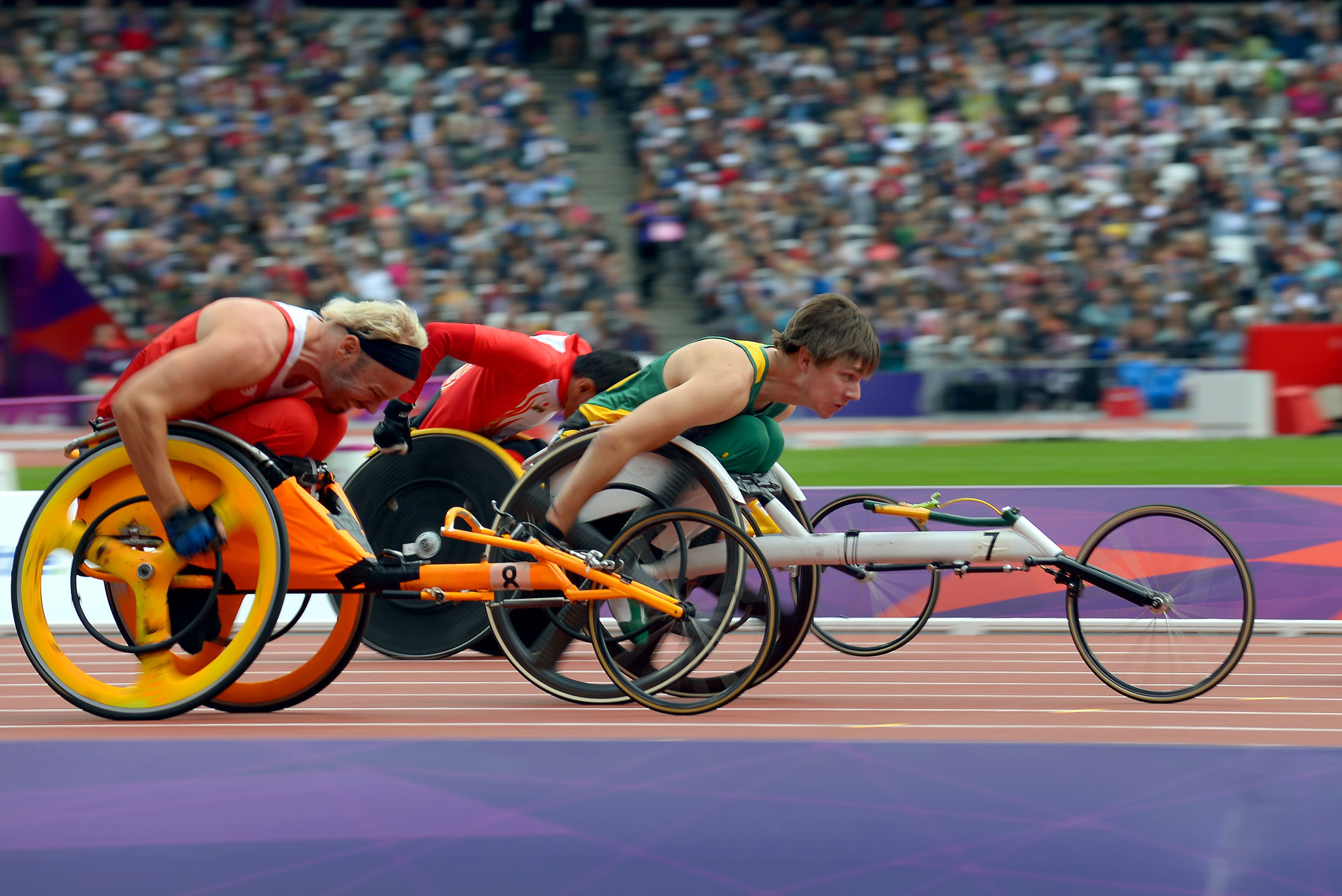
McIntosh at the 2012 London Paralympics

McIntosh is a T52 classified athlete who competes in the 100 metre, 200 metre and 400 metre events.

McIntosh switched from wheelchair rugby to athletics following a meeting with Kaye Colman, the mother of Richard Colman. He started competing in 2009. In 2010, he was coached by Mandi Cole. That year, he was able to purchase a racing wheelchair that fit him better. At the 2011 Australian National Titles, he earned a gold medal in the 100 metre event, and a silver medal in the 200 metre event.

In 2012, he participated in a national team training camp at the Australian Institute of Sport. He was selected to represent Australia at the 2012 Summer Paralympics in athletics in the 100 m and 200 m events. He did not medal at the 2012 Games.

Sam became ill after arriving in Rio for the 2016 Rio Paralympics. Although he was ill, he insisted on racing in the T52 100m event and he finished in fourth place. Just after crossing the finish line for the T52 100m finals, Beat Bösch mistakenly drifted into his lane and crashed into him. Sam was upturned on the track and his racing chair was badly damaged. A medical team attended to him and due to health concerns and a concussion from the crash, Sam withdrew from the upcoming 400m event.

At the 2017 World Para Athletics Championships in London, England, he finished sixth in 100m T52 (18.69s (+0.4)) and ranked 12th in the Men's 400m T52. McIntosh was one of three Geelong Para Athletes, as well as Martin Jackson and Jemima Moore, to be selected for the Championships.

At the 2019 World Para Athletics Championships in Dubai, UAE, he finished third in his 100m T52 heat, pushing him through to the finals where he placed sixth with a time of 17.69s, tying his season best. This time was fast enough to make him eligible to be selected for the Tokyo 2020 Paralympics (official selections have yet to be made).

At the 2020 Tokyo Paralympics, he finished fourth in the Men's 100m T52 and finished fifth in his heat of the Men's 400m T52. McIntosh at the 2023 World Para Athletics Championships in Paris, finished fourth in the Men's 100m T52 and seventh in heat of the Men's 400m T52.

At the 2024 Paris Paralympics, he competed in the Men's 100 m and 400 M T52 events and finished fifth and sixth in his heats respectively. At the 2025 World Para Athletics Championships in New Delhi, he finished fourth in Men's 1000 T52 in an Oceania record of 17.25.

He is coached by Fred Periac.

== Records ==
Sam currently holds three Australian National Records and two Oceania Records.

Australian National Records

T52 100m: 16.89s (+0.1 m/s) (Canberra, Australia, March 14, 2025) Previously beating his own record of 17.07 from Canberra, Australia in 2020

T52 200m: 32.02s (+0.6 m/s) (Arbon, Switzerland, June 4, 2015)

T52 400m: 1:04.08s (Perth, WA, Australia, April 16, 2010)

Oceania Records

T52 100m: 17.26s (+1.9 m/s) (Arbon, Switzerland, June 1, 2025) Previously beating his own record of 17.30 from Nottwil, Switzerland in 2025

T52 200m: 33.08s (+1.5 m/s) (Canberra, Australia, January 21, 2014)
