= Newcomb, Victoria =

Coordinates: 38.17°S 144.396°E

Newcomb
- Suburb
- Interactive map of Newcomb
- Country: Australia
- State: Victoria
- City: Geelong
- LGA: City of Greater Geelong

Government
  - State electorate: Geelong
  - Federal division: Corio

Population
  - Total: 4,704 (2016 census)
- Postcode: 3219
Suburbs around Newcomb
East Geelong	Corio Bay	Corio Bay
East Geelong	Newcomb	Moolap
Thomson	Whittington	Moolap

Newcomb is a residential suburb of Geelong, Victoria, Australia. At the 2021 census, Newcomb had a population of 4,704.

The Post Office opened on 2 July 1962 as the suburb developed.

The suburb has an Australian Rules football team competing in the Bellarine Football League.

The majority of Newcomb residential areas consist of mid 20th century homes, with no capacity for new housing estates, although there is a growing trend to subdivide larger blocks to build flats, whether by demolishing existing houses or by building behind them.

House prices in the area have grown exponentially within the last few years due largely to being close and easily accessible by essential services. Average house prices in the suburb in 2015 were $292,000 (only slightly more expensive than near-by Whittington), compared to $500,000 as of early 2021.

== Services ==
Newcomb is a suburb offering convenience to residents with two shopping centres, Newcomb Central and Bellarine Village both including a Woolworths supermarket and a range of other shops. The suburb's perimeter is only 3 kilometres from the Geelong CBD.

The Geelong CBD from Newcomb is easily accessible via public transport, with the suburb being directly serviced by bus route 30 and 31 between the CBD and Whittington. Bus routes 60 and 61, which run through Newcomb via Portarlington Rd and Bellarine Hwy respectively, also offer relatively easy public transport access to towns on the Bellarine Peninsula as well as the Geelong CBD.

== Streets ==
- Bellarine Highway
