= Vic Profitt =

Australian rules footballer

Personal information
- Full name: Victor Henry William Profitt
- Born: 24 May 1898; Moolap, Victoria
- Died: 20 October 1978 (aged 80); Newtown, Victoria

Playing career^{1}
Years	Club	Games (Goals)
1924–25	Geelong	4 (1)
- ^{1} Playing statistics correct to the end of 1925.

Victor Henry William Profitt (24 May 1898 – 20 October 1978) was an Australian rules footballer who played with Geelong in the Victorian Football League (VFL).
