= Bransby Cooper =

Australian cricketer (1844–1914)

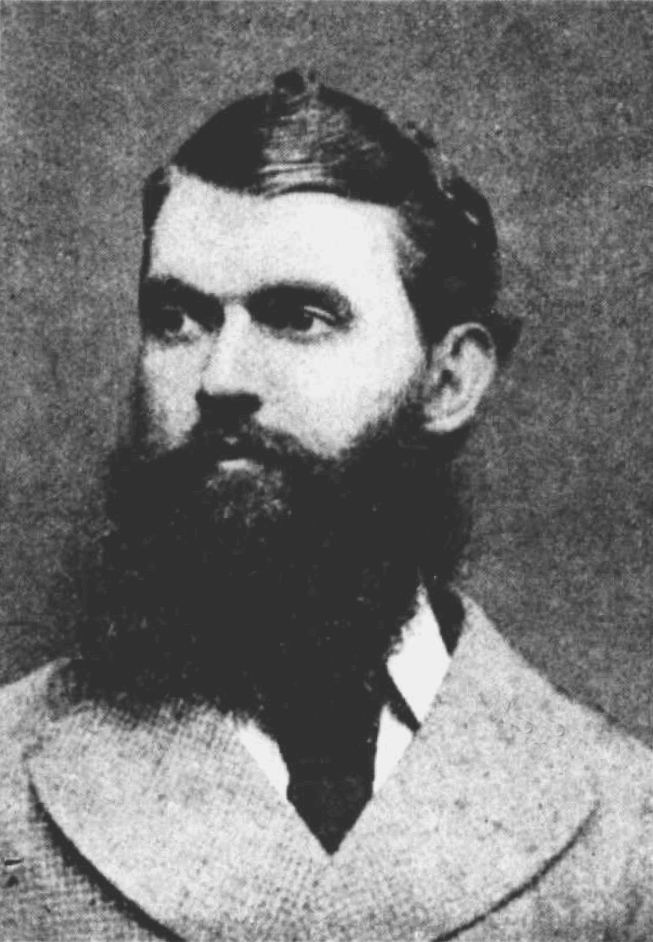

Personal information
- Full name: Bransby Beauchamp Cooper
- Born: 15 March 1844; Dacca, British India (Now Dhaka, Bangladesh)
- Died: 7 August 1914 (aged 70); Geelong, Victoria
- Height: 5 ft 10 1/2 in (1.79 m)
- Batting: Right-handed
- Role: Batsman, occasional wicket-keeper

International information
- National side: Australia
- Only Test (cap 3): 15 March 1877 v England

Domestic team information
- Years: Team
- 1863–1867: Middlesex
- 1868–1869: Kent
- 1870/71–1877/78: Victoria

Career statistics
Competition	Test	First-class
Matches	1	50
Runs scored	18	1,600
Batting average	9.00	20.51
100s/50s	0/0	1/7
Top score	15	101
Catches/stumpings	2/–	41/20
- Source: ESPNcricinfo, 9 October 2018

Bransby Beauchamp Cooper (15 March 1844 – 7 August 1914) was a member of the Australian cricket team that played the inaugural Test match at the Melbourne Cricket Ground in 1877. Cooper was born in Dacca in what was then British India in 1844. He played first-class cricket as an amateur in England for Middlesex and Kent County Cricket Clubs before moving to Australia where he played for Victoria. He was a right-handed batsman and wicket-keeper and the first Indian-born Test cricketer.

== Early life ==
Cooper has been described as "a public-school educated product of the English establishment". He was born in Dacca in British India, the son of Bransby Henry Cooper and his wife Mary. His father was an officer in the East India Company and died in 1857, his mother returning to England to live at Hemel Hempstead. Cooper was educated at Rugby School where he played cricket in the school XI between 1860 and 1862, coached by Alfred Diver.

== Cricket ==
Cooper played club cricket for Southgate Cricket Club and Free Foresters before going on to play first-class cricket for Middlesex and Kent. He made his first-class debut in 1863 for Middlesex against Surrey before the county club was formally founded and played in the first match Middlesex played after their formation in 1864. He also played for Marylebone Cricket Club (MCC) and the Gentlemen, often playing with William Gilbert Grace who made his Gentlemen debut in the same match as Cooper. He played eight times for Middlesex between 1863 and 1867 before moving to Tunbridge Wells and playing nine times for Kent in 1868 and 1869.

After the 1869 season Cooper moved firstly to the United States, where he played cricket for St George's Cricket Club at Hudson City in 1870, and then to Australia in 1871. He played for Victoria in 11 matches, including nine intercolonial matches against New South Wales. He has been described as being "recognised as the leading batsman in colonial cricket." In the inaugural Test match at Melbourne in 1877 Cooper was expected to be named as captain as Victorians outnumbered New South Welshmen. Dave Gregory was instead elected by the players for this honour. In what was to be his only Test match Cooper scored 15 and 3 runs and took 2 catches whilst becoming the first player to make their Test debut on their birthday. He helped Charles Bannerman add 77 for the fourth wicket in the first innings, the highest partnership of the match.

In all first-class matches, Cooper scored 1,600 runs at a batting average of 20.51, took 41 catches and made 20 stumpings. His only first-class century was a score of 101 made in 1869 for the Gentlemen of the South against the Players of the South; his partnership of 283 runs with W. G. Grace set a record for an opening partnership in first-class cricket which stood until 1892. His Wisden obituary said that he batted in a "very attractive style" with "patience and sound defence" and that he was a "fairly good wicketkeeper without approaching the front rank". Grace said, "His driving powers were good, and he could cut very prettily, but it was his patience and defence which made him so valuable."

== Professional and later life ==
Cooper worked on the London Stock Exchange. He was in business in both the United States and Australia, eventually becoming a senior official in the Customs Department at Queenscliff and Melbourne.

After marrying Helen Wilkinson in 1875 Cooper played less cricket. The couple had three daughters. They were living in Queenscliff when he died in Geelong in 1914 aged 70. He is buried in the Geelong Eastern Cemetery.

== Bibliography ==
- Carlaw, Derek (2020). Kent County Cricketers, A to Z: Part One (1806–1914) (PDF). Cardiff: ACS.
