= Saint Ignatius College, Geelong =

Saint Ignatius College

Location
- Drysdale, Victoria; Australia; 38°11′21″S 144°33′24″E

Information
- Type: Independent secondary day school
- Motto: Latin: Amare et Servire (To Love and Serve)
- Religious affiliation: Roman Catholic (Jesuit)
- Patron saint: Ignatius of Loyola
- Established: 1997; 29 years ago: at Drysdale; 2007; 19 years ago: as Saint Ignatius College
- Oversight: Melbourne Archdiocese Catholic Schools
- Chairperson: Tony Frizza
- Rector: Fr. James Puppady
- Principal: Michael Exton
- Years offered: 7–12
- Gender: Co-educational
- Enrolment: c. 1,350 (2020)
- Colours: Red, white and blue
- Song: We are Companions of Ignatius
- Yearbook: Magis
- Affiliation: Jesuit and Companion Schools in Australia
- Alumni: Old Ignatians
- Website: ignatius.vic.edu.au

Saint Ignatius College is an independent Catholic secondary day school for boys and girls, located in the rural hinterland of the Bellarine Peninsula near Geelong, Victoria, Australia. The school provides education from Year 7 to Year 12, conducted in the Jesuit tradition, and operates with oversight from Melbourne Archdiocese Catholic Schools. The college is part of the international network of Jesuit schools begun in Messina, Sicily in 1548.

== History ==
Founded in Drysdale in 1997, the name Saint Ignatius College (for Ignatius of Loyola) was not applied to the school until 2007, when the college became a Jesuit Partner School and formed a relationship with Xavier College in Melbourne. Announced in November 2006, before this time it had been the Drysdale campus of 'Catholic Regional College', which consolidated all operations to the campus in 2005.

=== Catholic Regional College ===
Logo of Catholic Regional College, motto was 'Christ our Light'

Saint Ignatius College Geelong is the only secondary Catholic school on the Bellarine Peninsula.

Catholic Regional College was formed in 1991 as an amalgamation of female-only Goold College and the male only St. Mary's Technical School, both located in inner city Geelong. In 1992 the College became fully coeducational teaching years 7 to 12, with the junior campus (years 7–9) at the St. Mary's site in Yarra Street, and the senior campus (years 10–12) at the Goold College site in Fenwick Street.

At the Yarra Street campus a new Home Economics centre, canteen, and two additional classroom, along with extensions to the Engineering building. At Fenwick Street refurbishment was carried out to older buildings, including the science labs, art rooms, library and administration offices. Due to the Yarra Street campus having a heritage as a technical school, the majority of the 'hands on' woodworking, metalworking and engineering subjects were taught there, with senior students required to walk the three blocks between campuses.

A third campus was opened at Drysdale in 1997, initially catering for years 7 and 8 only. This campus operated separately from the two 'City' campuses, with sports days and whole of school masses being the main links for students at the two campuses.

In 1999 the 'St Thomas' campus at Drysdale had 189 students and offered the Year 10 program to students for the first time. It had five composite Year 7/8 home rooms, two Year 9 home rooms, and one Year 10 homeroom. The same year the city campuses each had around 250 students each. Also in 1999 the school introduced ties and blazers as part of the uniform for incoming students, expanding to all year levels in 2000.

In 2000 science buildings at the Yarra Street campus were refurbished, and a $450,000 Technology Centre was opened. The same year inaugural principal Netty Broekman left the school. The Drysdale campus remained teaching Years 7 to 10, with an enrolment of 280. It was decided to not expand to offer Year 11 at the campus in 2000 due to the limited subject section for the Victorian Certificate of Education, with students transferring to the city campus. This remained an issue for the entire time that the three campuses operated. The curriculum at the junior campus was altered in 2000, with a 'Middle Years' program for Years 7 and 8, and a 'Horizons' program for Year 9 introduced, based on programs started at the Drysdale campus when it opened.

By 2002 the Drysdale campus had a Year 12 class, but only of 10 students. By 2004 (the last year of separate campuses) it had only increased to 29.

In 2003 a review was carried out by the school administrators and the Melbourne Catholic Education Office, with the decision made to consolidate the school at the Drysdale campus. The senior campus at Fenwick Street was first to close at the end of 2003, with years 8, 10 and 12 continuing on the junior campus site at Yarra Street in 2004. The Fenwick Street campus was sold to Education Department in 2004 for the expansion of the neighbouring Matthew Flinders Girls Secondary College, while part of the Yarra Street campus is used as offices for the parish of St Mary's, with other parts demolished for the expansion of the neighbouring fire station. Proposals were also made in late 2007 for the relocation of St Mary's Primary School to the remainder of the site.

== Management ==
The college is conducted on behalf of the thirteen Roman Catholic parishes of Geelong and Drysdale. It is administered by the body of parish priests (the Canonical Administrators) of Geelong, and is managed by a College Board under the delegation of the Canonical Administrators.

The current principal is Michael Exton, who was the original Drysdale campus director when it was part of Catholic Regional College. School fees range from $4920 at Year 7 to $5320 at Year 12.

== Facilities ==
When opened in 1997, the main building on the Drysdale campus was a two-storey library / classroom / computer room / canteen, known as the "Experiment, Design and Construction Centre" (EDCC) with portable classrooms making up the rest of the school. The current buildings have been erected since this time, with a large building program commenced in the lead up to the consolidation of Catholic Regional College at the site. The EDCC was renovated in 2012–13. This meant new science labs, media, graphics and art rooms were opened. An art gallery features students accomplishments and the library was refurbished and expanded.

Other buildings have since been opened such as the VCE block, Year 10 buildings, a new canteen, Gymnasium, Food Technology and Technology buildings. In 2014 the VCE building was officially named the MacKillop Centre.

In 2013, Saint Ignatius College opened a state of the art Year 7 and 8 building. Accommodating up to 400 students, the new building is highly energy efficient and stays cool easily in the summer. The building was named The Saint Francis Xavier building but is commonly known as the Xavier Centre.

In addition, and completed in 2019/2020, is the indoor double-court multi-purpose complex. It sits adjacent to the dedicated Year 9 Learning Centre, which comprisies of "multiple classrooms, numerous staffrooms, presentation rooms and outdoor areas". The College utilises this complex for a variety of uses including as a space for the school population of over 1300 students to gather together as a whole school for assemblies and liturgies. In the beginning of 2025, the multi-purpose complex was officially named the Companions Centre.

A new Loyola Centre was completed in late 2021. It houses Student, Staff and Administration services.

Plans for a dedicated Senior School building for students in Year 10, 11 and 12 began in 2022. Initial estimates put the anticipated completion date for the building as 20 January 2024. Construction began in late August/September of 2022 and was completed in late February/March of 2024. The building was officially opened in late March 2024 and classes began in the centre in April 2024. It features "16 classrooms, a 330 seat lecture theatre, maker spacers, break out spaces and learning decks" and is "a hub of learning and teaching for our students in the Ignatian tradition". The cost of the project was $25.5 million, with $1 million funded by a State Government Grant.

Despite being located 15 minutes east of Geelong, the college operates a number of bus services, enabling students from across Geelong and the Bellarine Peninsula, as well as towns such as Bannockburn, Anakie, Lethbridge, Inverleigh, Moriac, Winchelsea, Lara and Torquay to attend the school.

== School sports ==
Saint Ignatius College offers a wide range of sports. Annual house carnivals include athletics, cross country and swimming. Saint Ignatius provides many sporting opportunities, including:

- Australian rules football: In 2019, the School won the Herald Sun Shield Division 2
- Basketball
- Cricket
- Cross country
- Diving
- Equestrian
- Golf
- Hockey
- Netball
- Soccer
- Surf Life Saving (Surf League)
- Swimming
- Tennis
- Track and field
- Volleyball

== House system ==
Saint Ignatius College runs a house system which is based on points earned. There are four houses at Saint Ignatius College: Xavier, MacKillop, Glowrey and Ricci. The four House names were chosen based on their achievements and connection with Saint Ignatius College. Upon entering Year 7, all students attending Saint Ignatius are assigned a house. There are male & female house captains and male & female vice captains for each house. The houses compete for the House Cup.

The House System was updated in 2023 to recognise a more diverse range of achievements - including a number of additional activities throughout the year specifically related to the Arts, Academics and Community Service (this is in addition to the more traditional sporting achievements from Athletics, Swimming, Cross Country and more). Additionally, points are allocated for students that receive Positive Affirmations or Loyola Awards.

The houses are as follows:

House	Xavier	Mackillop	Glowrey	Ricci
Colour	Red	Yellow	Blue	Green
Named after	St Francis Xavier, SJ Catholic Missonary and Saint	St. Mary MacKillop Australian Religious Sister	Dr Sr Mary Glowrey Australian Religious Sister & Doctor	Fr Matteo Ricci, SJ Italian Catholic Missonary

== Activities ==
The college was an active participant in the RACV Energy Breakthrough from at least 1999 onwards.

== Notable alumni ==
- Jhye Clark – AFL footballer for Geelong
- Emily Mannix – netball player for the Melbourne Vixens and the Australian Diamonds
- Sam McIntosh – Paralympic athlete
- Flynn Young – AFL footballer for Carlton
- Kye Annand - AFL footballer for Richmond

== See also ==
- Catholic education in Australia
- List of schools in Victoria
- List of high schools in Victoria
- List of Jesuit schools
