= Percy Ellingsen =

Australian rules footballer

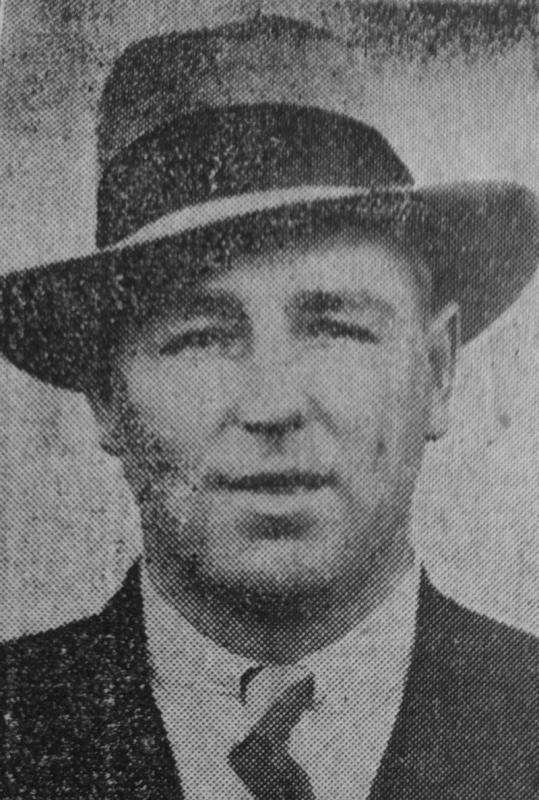

Personal information
- Full name: Percy Ellingsen
- Born: 18 July 1895; Ballarat, Victoria
- Died: 7 May 1947 (aged 51); Ulverstone, Tasmania
- Original team: East Geelong (GDFA)
- Height: 168 cm (5 ft 6 in)
- Weight: 86 kg (190 lb)
- Position: Rover

Playing career^{1}
Years	Club	Games (Goals)
1912	Richmond	6 (5)
1913	Melbourne	2 (1)
1915, 1917–19	Geelong	36 (52)
Total		44 (58)
- ^{1} Playing statistics correct to the end of 1919.

Percy Ellingsen (18 July 1895 – 7 May 1947) was an Australian rules footballer who played for Richmond, Melbourne and Geelong in the Victorian Football League (VFL).

Ellingsen was just 16 when he made his league debut in 1912, having been recruited from East Geelong. A rover, he kicked five goals for Richmond, all of them in a win over Melbourne University Football Club. He then spent the 1913 VFL season at Melbourne before crossing to Geelong, his final VFL club. His tally of 18 goals in 1917 included a bag of six against his old club Richmond, at Corio Oval. Also that season, Ellingsen set a club record which still stands to this day by kicking the only two goals that Geelong managed in their match against Collingwood.

Following his VFL career, Ellingsen moved to the Victorian Football Association (VFA), where over a three-year period he represented North Melbourne, Footscray and Geelong Association. In 1920 he was suspended for a season, a sentence later overturned as an act of clemency during the visit of the Prince of Wales.

In 1930, Ellingsen joined the Geelong and District Football League as a field umpire. The following year he was appointed to the VFL Senior List and, unusually for the period, did not umpire any country or Second Eighteen matches before being appointed to his first VFL senior match in Round 1 - St.Kilda v. Essendon at the Junction Oval. This earned him Heritage Number 150 as the 150th field umpire in VFL history.

He umpired the entire 1931 season in the VFL including the First Semi-final and finished the year appointed to the Goulburn Valley Football League finals series.

From 1931–33 Ellingsen compiled a total of 53 VFL and 24 VCFL matches. The only Grand Finals he officiated were in the 1931 Wednesday Football League and the 1932 Corangamite Football League.

In June 1932 he was appointed to the North v. South representative match in Launceston and so began a significant connection with Tasmanian umpiring.

Offered two options for his umpiring career in early 1934 Ellingsen accepted a contract with the Tasmanian Australian National Football Football League in 1934 to act as the local umpire for the season. He had also been approached by the Mildura league to act in a similar capacity.

For the next five years he continued to umpire in Tasmania as follows:

- TANFL 1934–35
- North-West Football Union (NWFU) 1936
- Northern Tasmanian Football Association 1937
- Tasmanian Amateur Football Association 1938

Ellingsen retired from umpiring at the end of the 1938 season and returned to Melbourne where he worked, as he had when not umpiring, as a barman. Remaining in the hotel trade he returned to Ulverstone, Tasmania in 1945, where he became publican of the Commercial Hotel.

Maintaining his interest in local football he became president and non-playing coach of Ulverstone Football Club in 1946. He was the club's delegate to, and also a selector for, the NWFU that same year.

Furthermore, he gave weekly lectures at the new umpires' class for the Western Division of the NWFU run by O.H. Hind, making it a very busy year.

After a short illness Percy Ellingsen died on 7 May 1947. His body was returned to Geelong where he was buried in the Eastern Cemetery.

Later in 1947 Geelong visited Burnie and played a representative NWFU team. Ellingsen had umpired a similar match in 1937 which resulted in a 192-point win for the visitors. At the conclusion of the 1947 match the Cats Kevin Brown was presented with a gold medal for being best afield. The medal was named in honour of Percy Ellingsen, presented by his second wife Dorothy and commemorated his connection with Geelong and Tasmania.
