= William Houison Craufurd =

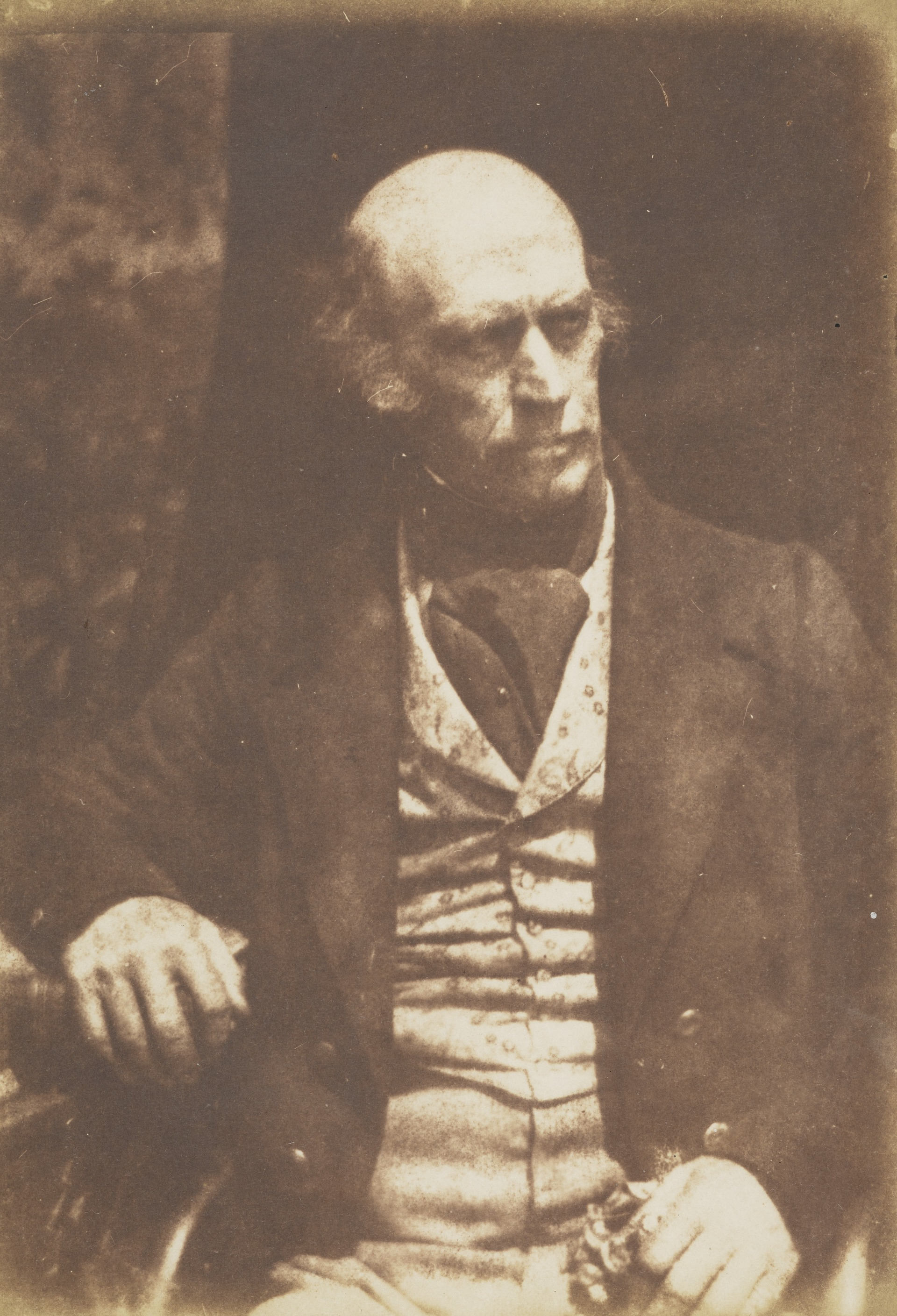
- William Howieson Craufurd by Hill & Adamson

Personal details
- Born: 29 November 1781
- Died: 17 September 1871 (aged 89)

Deputy-Lieutenant of the County of Ayr

Justice of the Peace

Commissioner of Supply

William Houison Craufurd, sometimes spelled William Howieson Craufurd (29 November 1781 – 17 September 1871) was a landed country gentleman. He was a Deputy-Lieutenant of the County of Ayr, Justice of the Peace, and Commissioner of Supply. After several years as an elder in the Church of Scotland, he left at the Disruption and joined the Free Church of Scotland. He was photographed by Hill & Adamson, pioneering photographers, who recorded many Free Church ministers and leaders.

== Ancestry, early life and training ==
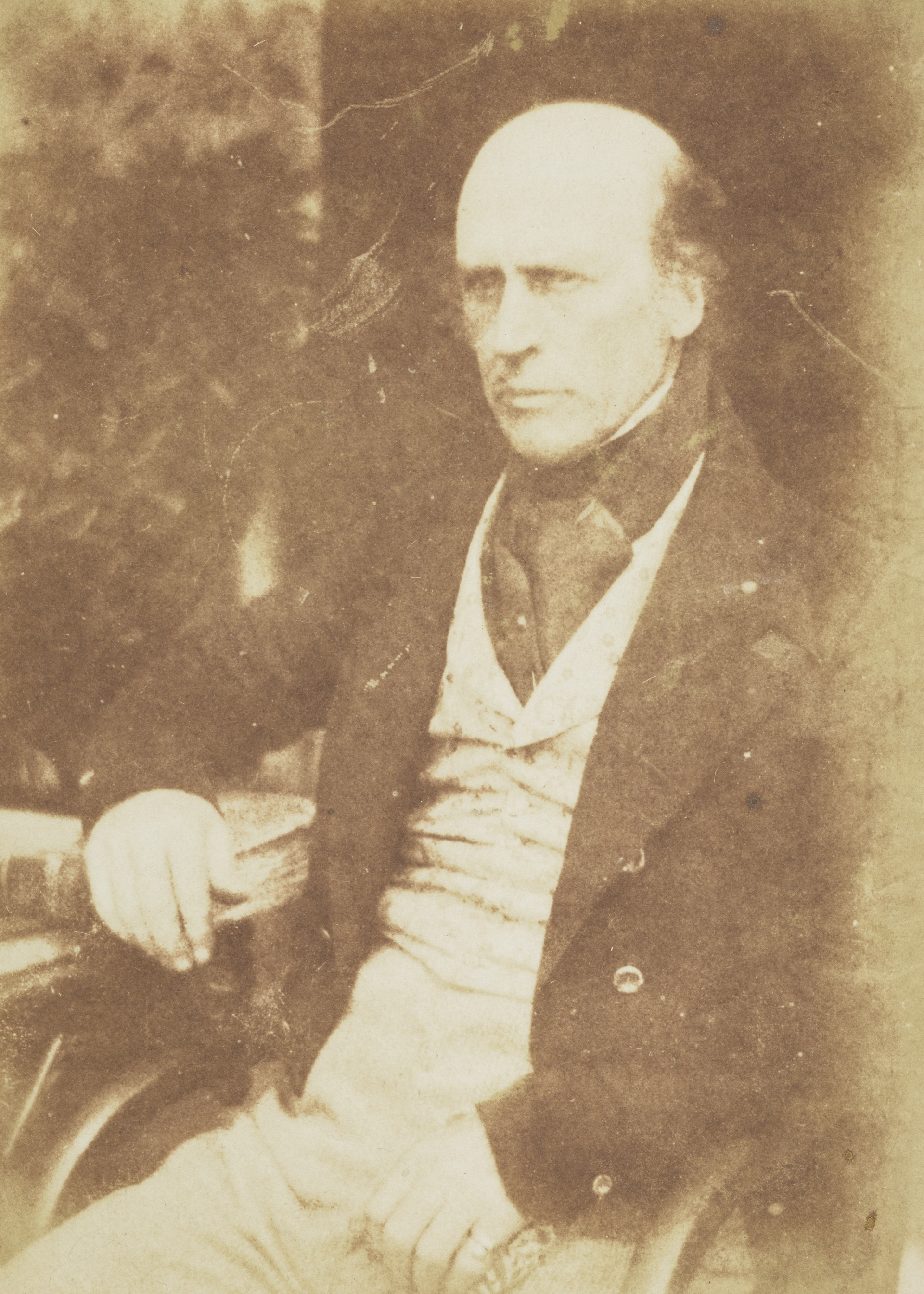
William Howieson Craufurd by Hill & Adamson from National Galleries Scotland

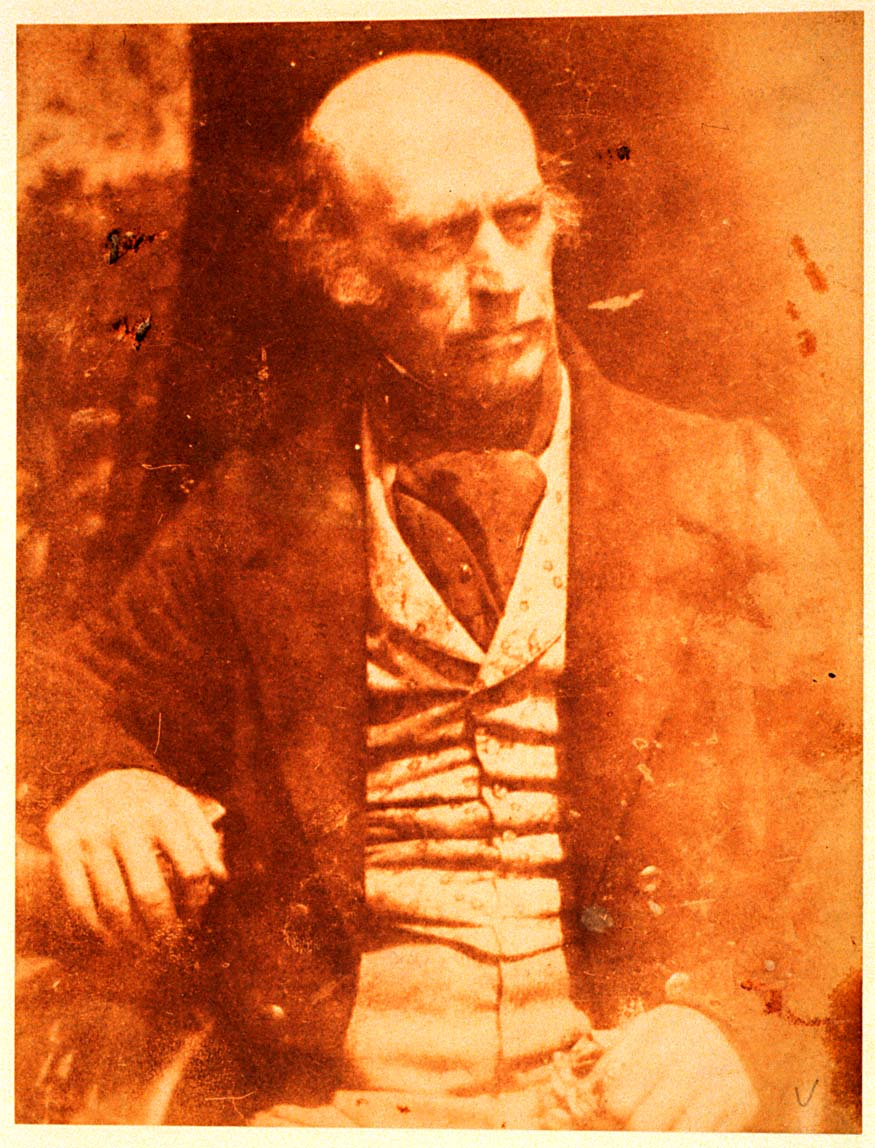
William Howieson Craufurd by Hill & Adamson from Glasgow University's Hill and Adamson collection

William Houison-Craufurd of Craufurdland and Braehead was born on 29 November 1781. His father was James Moody, a Church of Scotland minister. James came to the West Church, Perth on 11 June 1772. James Moody assumed the name of Howison Craufurd in consequence of his succession by marriage to the estate of Craufurdland, by decision of the House of Lords on 14 March 1806. He subsequently demitted his post on 2 December 1807. William's mother was Elizabeth, the eldest daughter of John Howison and heiress of Braehead, Cramond. William Houison Craufurd was educated at the High School of Edinburgh, from which he passed to the university.

== Political life and offices ==
In all public matters Mr Craufurd took a great and active interest. He was a Deputy-Lieutenant of the County of Ayr, Justice of the Peace, and Commissioner of Supply. All through life he was a keen politician and thoroughly Conservative. While the progress of events somewhat modified his views, he retained his political opinions to the end.

== Work as a Church of Scotland elder ==
Craufurd occupied the chair at Bible Society and missionary meetings in Edinburgh, and joined with Dr Andrew Thomson in the defence of pure Bible circulation. He also enrolled himself in the ranks of Anti-patronage, a cause which in those days was treated with ridicule and scorn. As an elder of the church, he sat for nearly sixty years in the General Assembly, and although his voice was seldom heard in the discussions, his influence and vote were consistent.

== At the Disruption ==
At the Disruption, along with several other elders and a considerable following of the people, he left the Low Church of Kilmarnock, and attached himself to the Free High Church, in which for twenty-eight years, till the day of his death, he continued to bear office. In everything connected with the congregation he took the deepest interest. The Sustentation Fund especially was financially supported, and he made the Deacons' Courts of the various congregations in which his properties were situated the channel of communication.

Later in life he was requested by his numerous friends to sit for his portrait, which was hung in Craufurdland Castle. The Presbytery of Irvine, whose representative in the General Assembly he had been for fifty years, invited him to a public entertainment to celebrate his official jubilee.

== Royal tradition ==
The Howisons possessed Braehead in Mid Lothian since the reign of James the First. According to a tradition, which is embodied in the popular drama of 'Cramond Brig,' part of the estate was conferred by James the Second or Third, as a reward to one of their ancestors for having gone to the rescue of the king, then wandering about in disguise, when attacked by a gang of gipsies, and with no other weapon than his flail, with which he had been threshing corn in his barn, delivering him from his assailants. The tenure by which this land is held, is the presenting of a basin of water and a napkin to the king of Scotland, to wash his hands, King James, on entering Howison's cottage, before partaking of refreshment, having asked for water and a cloth to wipe the marks of the scuffle from his clothes. This service was performed by Mr. Howison-Crawfurd, then younger of Crawfurdland, in right of the lairdship of Braehead, to King George the Fourth, at the banquet given to his majesty by the city of Edinburgh, 24 August 1822, when he was attended by masters Charles and Walter Scott, the one a son, the other a nephew of the author of Waverley, as pages, attired in splendid dresses of scarlet and white satin. The rose-water then used has ever since been hermetically sealed up, and the towel which dried the hands of his majesty on that occasion has never been used for any other purpose. All the documents mentioned as granted to the above-named Archibald Craufurd, almoner to Queen Mary, were likewise carefully preserved by the Craufurdland family.

== Death ==
He died on 17 September 1871. He was buried on 23 September 1871 at the family burial ground at Fenwick Parish Church.

== Family ==
He married on 14 June 1808, Jane Esther, only daughter of James Whyte, Esq. of Newmains, by his wife, Esther Craufurd, with issue. She collected manuscripts including one of 'Epitaph' on Grizzel Grim by Robert Burns.
