= Craufurdland Castle =

House in East Ayrshire, Scotland, UK

- Kilmarnock, East Ayrshire in Scotland
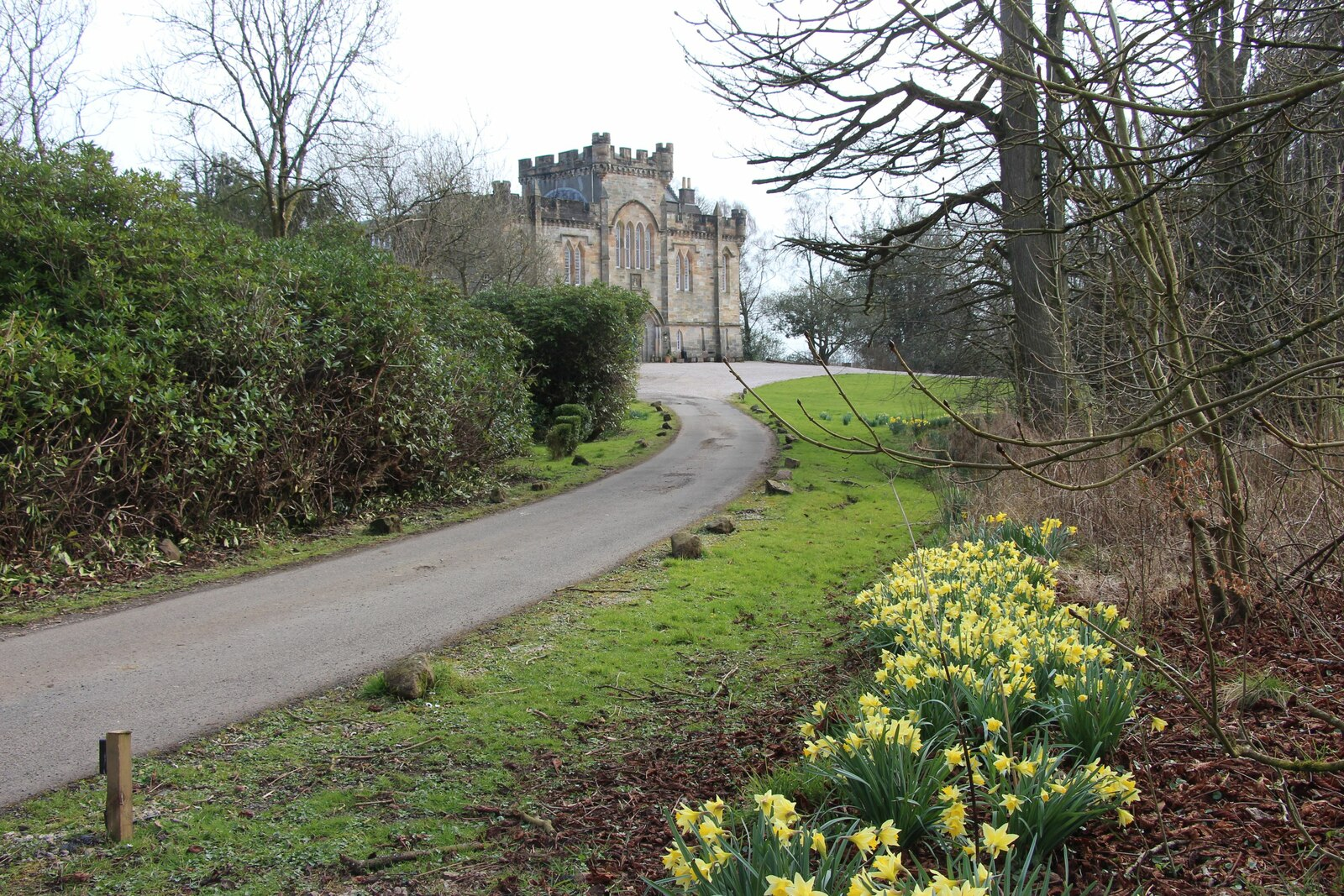

Site information
- Type: Tower house / Country house
- Owner: Houison Craufurd family
- Open to the public: No (Estate businesses open)
- Status: Private residence

Location
- Location within Scotland
- Coordinates: 55°38′10″N 4°27′16″W

Site history
- Built: 16th century
- Built by: Crawford family

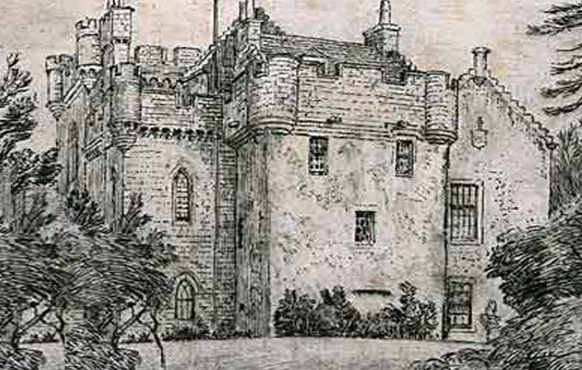
Drawing of Craufurdland Castle

Craufurdland Castle is a rebuilt tower house, originating in the 16th century, about 2.5 miles (4.0 km) north east of Kilmarnock, East Ayrshire, Scotland, north of the Craufurdland Water.

== History ==
The property belonged to the Crawfords from the 13th century. John Crauford of Craufurdland was killed at the battle of Flodden in 1513.

Archibald Crauford of Craufordland, younger brother of the laird John Craufurd, was the Parson of Eaglesham and a courtier who served Mary of Guise and Mary, Queen of Scots as an almoner. He visited Mary, Queen of Scots, at Joinville, Haute-Marne, on 17 April 1561. He was in charge of her chapel goods and silver plate. In November 1567, after Mary was deposed, he delivered some of her silverware to Regent Moray and the treasurer Robert Richardson.

The castle was built in the 16th century, remodelled and extended in the 17th century, and further extended in the 18th and 19th centuries. Ownership passed to the Howiesons in 1793.

The house was restored in the 1980s, and is still occupied.

Simon Houison Craufurd, 29th Laird of Craufurdland Castle, holds the role of Washer of the Sovereign's Hands in Scotland.

== Structure ==
A corbelled-out battlement at one end of the original tower remains as part of the west wing. There is a basement which is vaulted, but the interior of the tower has been greatly altered. There is a fine plaster ceiling in the King's Room, dated 1668, incorporating the arms of the Stewarts.

The 17th-century east wing is two storeys high. It is said that an underground passage connected the castle to Dean Castle, some miles away. The castle was remodelled as a crenellated mansion in Gothic style.

== Estate businesses ==
Some of the land on the estate is farmed. The family also run a children's nursery, holiday accommodation and other enterprises from the estate. Simon Crauford has talked about the financial struggles involved in keeping the property going and the community activities the estate carries out.

== Millionaire Hoarders ==
In 2023, the estate and family appeared on the Channel 4 television programme Millionaire Hoarders.

== See also ==
- William Houison Craufurd
- Castles in Great Britain and Ireland
- List of castles in Scotland
