= Caroline Elizabeth Newcomb =

(1812–1874) London born woman squatter in Tasmania

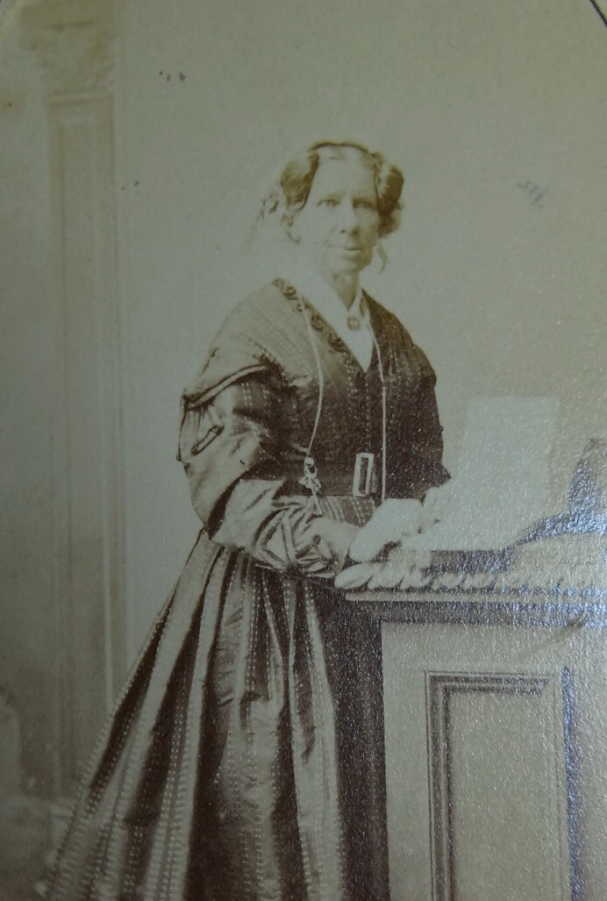
- Caroline Elizabeth Newcomb
- Born: 5 October 1812; London
- Died: 3 October 1874; Brunswick, Victoria
- Other name: Caroline Elizabeth Dodgson
- Known for: Pioneer squatter
- Spouse: Rev. James Davy Dodgson
- Partner: Anne Drysdale

Caroline Elizabeth Newcomb (5 October 1812 - 3 October 1874) was a British emigrant pioneer squatter with her long-term companion and partner Anne Drysdale, from whom we get the name of the town of Drysdale, Victoria. She inherited the property when Anne died. She later married the Rev. James Davy Dodgson.

== Early life ==
Newcomb was born in London in 1812. Her mother isn't known and she was taken in by her grandmother when her British father, Samuel Newcomb, died. Her father had been a commisar in Iberia. In 1833 she arrived in Tasmania which was then known as Van Dieman's land.

== Pioneer life ==
Newcomb had emigrated to Tasmania to benefit her health and she first lived in Hobart Town. She was employed as a governess by the Batman family. John Batman set out with his wife, his children and their governess to Port Phillip in 1836.

In the following year she became known to Dr Alexander Thomson and his family and in the March 1837 she moved to their house in Geelong.

Three years later Anne Drysdale arrived at Port Phillip in March 1840 and soon after became a guest of Dr Thomson. She and Caroline became friends and, when Anne decided on Boronggoop as the site for her run, they also became partners. Anne was an experienced farmer and twenty years senior to Caroline. A cottage, built for them, was completed in August 1841 and they established a home together with a piano and a garden. Anne had a high regard for Newcomb, describing her as the "most clever person I have ever met with. There seems to be magic in her touch". The Armstrong family and others entered their employ.

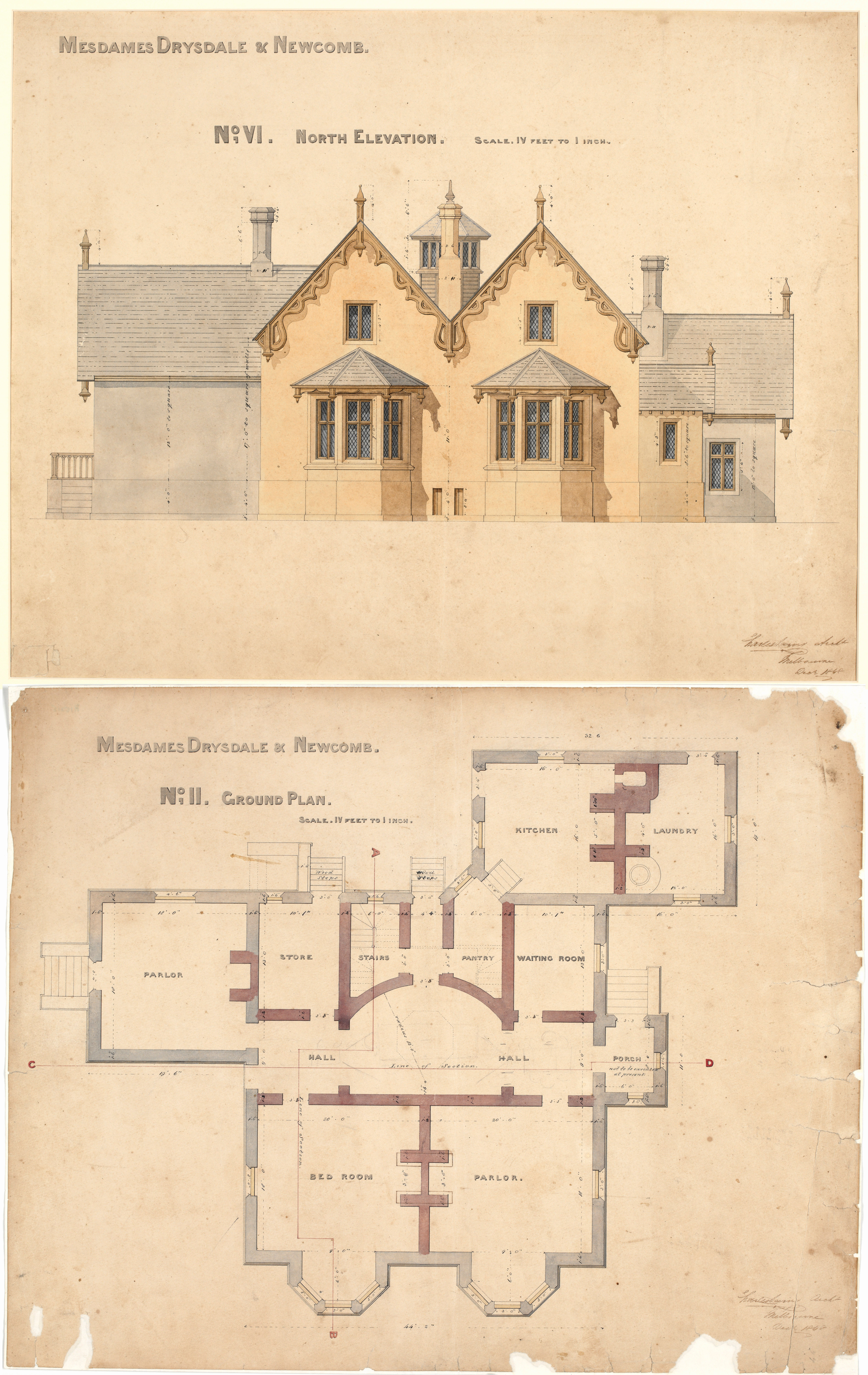
Charles Laing's 1849 design for Coryule, near Drysdale on the Bellarine Peninsula

As Boronggoop was held by licence, Drysdale was anxious to own a freehold property. By 1843 they had established an outstation, Lap Lap, on Reedy Lake, and had heard of the run Coryule, near modern Drysdale. On 18 July they settled the sale of the property from Mr. Austin and they engaged the architect Charles Laing who in 1849 designed the stone house Coryule, overlooking Port Phillip Bay. In June 1852 Anne Drysdale suffered a stroke and, after a period of invalidity, died May 1853. Caroline inherited the property. She was elected a member of the first Portarlington Road Board and became its secretary. On 27 November 1861, Caroline married the Methodist Rev. James Davy Dodgson (1824-1892) at the recently built Wesley Church in Lonsdale Street, Melbourne. Newcomb would accompany her husband on Methodist circuit work.

Newcomb died at the Wesleyan Parsonage in c, on 3 October 1874 after two weeks of illness. She was buried beside Anne Drysdale. Her will was disputed by her sister and her family. She had left instructions that her husband should receive all of her estate and he was the sole executor. Her husband went to court in an equity case known as "Dodgson v. Clare" and he was successful.

Her and Anne's house, Coryule, is extant and is said to be the best example of her architect, Charles Laing's, work.
