= Thomson, Victoria =

Thomson Geelong, Victoria
- Coordinates: 38.170°S 144.381°E
- Population: 1,607 (2016 census)
- Postcode(s): 3219
- LGA(s): City of Greater Geelong
- State electorate(s): Geelong
- Federal division(s): Corio
Suburbs around Thomson:
East Geelong	East Geelong	Newcomb
South Geelong	Thomson	Whittington
Breakwater	Breakwater	Whittington

Thomson is a small residential suburb of Geelong, Victoria, Australia. Thomson is triangular in shape and is bounded in the west by Breakwater Road, Carr Street and St Albans Road, in the north by Lomond Terrace, Godfrey and Ensby Streets, and in the east by Ormond and Boundary Roads.

The East Geelong campus of The Gordon Institute of TAFE is located here, which also includes their student residence.

Thomson was named after the early settler and the first mayor of Geelong Dr. Alexander Thomson.

Thomson Post Office opened in 1950 and closed in 1992.

Thomson has an Australian Rules football team competing in the Geelong & District Football League.
