= Whittington, Victoria =

Whittington Geelong, Victoria
- Coordinates: 38.18°S 144.39°E
- Population: 3,990 (2021 census)
- Postcode(s): 3219
- LGA(s): City of Greater Geelong
- State electorate(s): Geelong
- Federal division(s): Corio
Suburbs around Whittington:
Thomson	Newcomb	Moolap
Thomson	Whittington	Moolap
Breakwater	St Albans Park	Moolap

Whittington is a residential suburb of Geelong, Victoria, Australia, located 4 km south-east of the city centre. It is bordered by Boundary, Townsend and Coppards roads and by the former Geelong to Queenscliff railway line now known as the Bellarine Rail Trail. At the 2021 census, Whittington had a population of 3,990.

A large part of Whittington is laid out in cul-de-sacs and courts to inhibit traffic and to help create numerous neighbourhood reserves. Whittington contains a shopping centre, a community centre, recreation reserves and the Whittington Primary School.

== History ==
The area of Whittington was originally part of Breakwater, and was named after an early land owner, James Whittington, during the 1920s. A Post Office of that name had been open since 1914.

== Notable people ==
Damien Birkinhead – Olympic shot putter

Lee Troop – Olympic marathon runner

George Blagojevic – NBL Basketball player

== Education ==
Whittington Primary School is a small Primary School located in Whittington, Victoria.
