= Lee Troop =

Australian long-distance runner (born 1973)

Personal information
- Full name: Lee Joseph Troop
- Nickname: Troopy
- Nationality: Australian
- Born: 22 March 1973 (age 53) Geelong, Australia
- Height: 178 cm (70 in)
- Weight: 53 kg (117 lb)

Sport
- Club: Athletics Chilwell

Lee Joseph Troop (born 22 March 1973) is an Olympic marathon runner from Geelong, Victoria, Australia. Starting as a long-distance track runner, he represented Australia in the 5000 m at the 1998 Commonwealth Games and attended his first World Athletics Championships the following year. He broke the Australian record in the 5000 m in 1999.

After changed to the marathon distance, he made his Olympic debut in the 2000 Olympic marathon race in Australia but finished in 66th place after an injury. Further injuries interrupted his next two seasons, but he returned and finished 17th in the marathon at the 2003 World Championships and 27th at the 2004 Athens Olympics. He qualified for the 2008 Beijing Olympics but despite his aim of making the top ten, he finished in 60th place.

== Early life ==
Lee became involved in athletics at the age of 11, when he joined his father's weight loss campaign by taking training runs around the Geelong suburb of Whittington. He joined Athletics Chilwell (formerly Chilwell Athletic Club) in 1986 and has competed for the club ever since. During a brief stint in the 1990s, he competed on a second-claim basis for the cross country team from Ballarat Harriers in the Athletics Victoria winter competition series. He was mentored by Steve Moneghetti, the 1994 Commonwealth champion in the marathon.

== World debut ==
In 1996, Troop won Victoria's regional 5000 metres championship. He first represented Australia at the 1998 Commonwealth Games in Kuala Lumpur. He finished sixth in the 5000 m and seventh in the 10,000 metres. He competed in the 5000 m at the 1999 World Championships in Athletics but did not progress beyond the heats.

He broke Ron Clarke's 33-year-old national record in the 5000 m in 1999, but decided to focus on marathon running in the lead-up to the 2000 Sydney Olympics. However, after qualifying, he tore a stomach muscle and struggled to finish in 66th place.

== 2004–2008 Olympics ==
For the next two years, Troop was troubled by a series of injuries but bounced back in 2003, enjoying his best ever form. He ran a personal best of 2:09:49 at Lake Biwa Marathon, and finished 17th at the World Championships in Paris. He placed 27th at the 2004 Athens Olympic Games in the marathon with a time of 2:18.46. He broke down shortly after with a stress fracture of the pelvis.

In October 2007, Troop ran 2:10:31 at the Berlin Marathon – an Olympic A-grade qualifying time. In May 2008, Troop was the only nomination for the Australian Men's team in the marathon for the 2008 Beijing Olympics. Troop said he wanted to emulate the feats of Australian marathon legends Robert de Castella and his coach Steve Moneghetti in achieving a top 10 placing at the Olympic Games. In the 2008 Olympic marathon race he finished 60th in a time of 2:27:17.

In October 2008, Lee announced that he and his family may move to the United States with a desire to run in the Boston and New York marathons. In 2008, he finished fourth in the Melbourne Half Marathon and took part in the Shanghai Marathon.

In April 2013, Lee finished 15th in the Boston Marathon in 2:17:52 at 40 years old.

== Boulder Track Club and T.E.A.M. Boulder ==
Lee began coaching for Boulder Track Club in 2011 and coached elite runners including Laura Thweatt. He now owns and manages T.E.A.M. Boulder with current elite runners Alejandro Ambrosio, Abdulmuhsen Mubarak Alali, Melissa Dock, Samuel Lanternier, Jacob Riley, Carrie Verdon, Ericka Waterman, and Chase Weaverling.
