= Drysdale, Victoria =

Drysdale
- Suburb
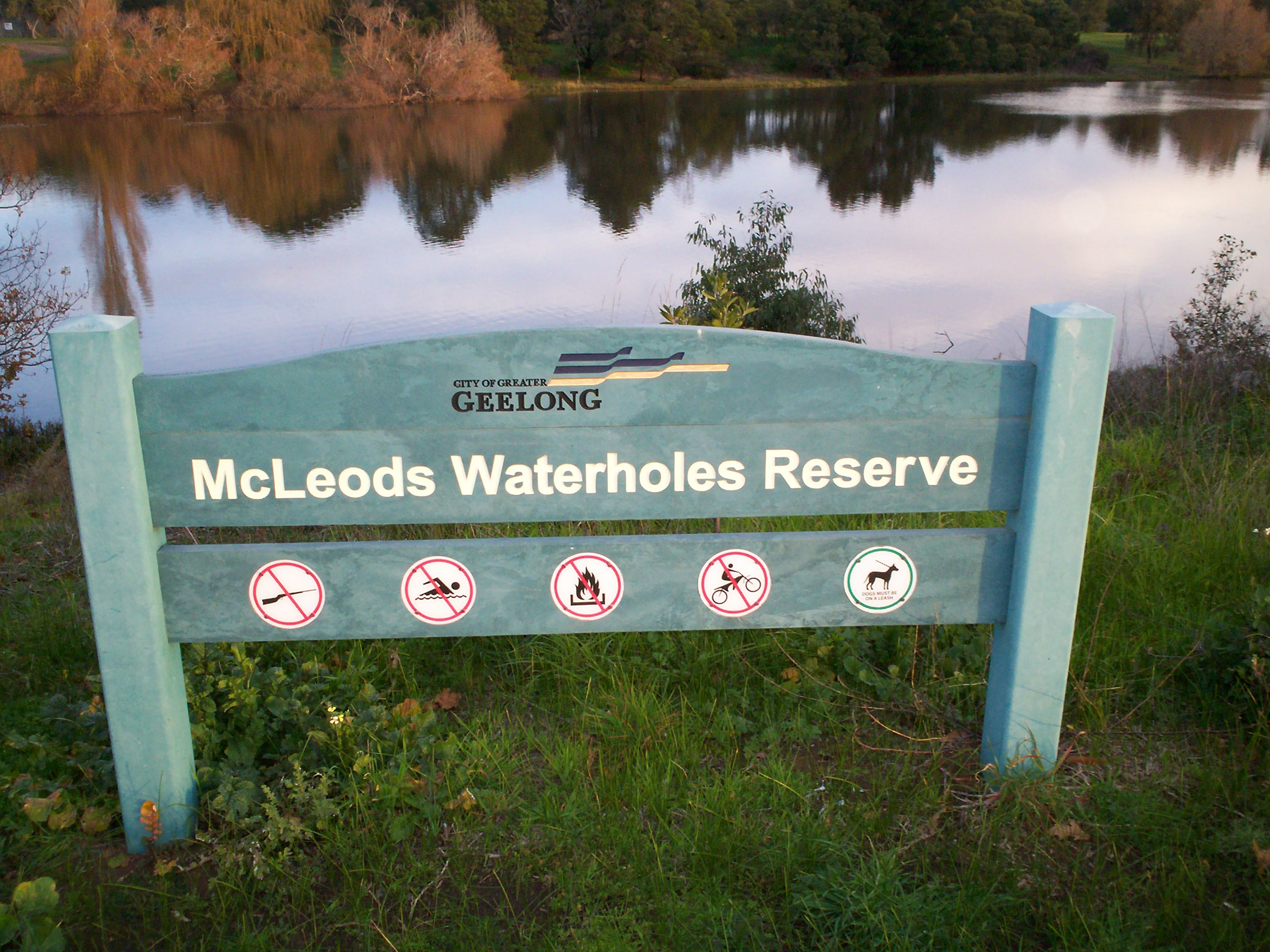
- McLeods Waterholes Reserve in Drysdale

- Interactive map of Drysdale
- Coordinates: 38°10′S 144°34′E
- Country: Australia
- State: Victoria
- City: Geelong
- LGA: City of Greater Geelong
- Location: 91 km (57 mi) from Melbourne; 20 km (12 mi) from Geelong

Government
  - State electorate: Bellarine
  - Federal division: Corangamite

Population
  - Total: 4,976 (2021 census)
- Postcode: 3222
Suburbs around Drysdale
Clifton Springs	Bellarine	Portarlington
Curlewis	Drysdale	St Leonards
Wallington	Mannerim	Swan Bay

Drysdale is a rural township near Geelong, Victoria, Australia, located on the Bellarine Peninsula. The town has an approximate population of over 3,700. Drysdale forms part of an urban area, along with nearby Clifton Springs, that had an estimated population of 13,494 at June 2016.

A popular youth music and performing arts venue, affectionately labelled 'The Potato Shed' is located in the back of Drysdale. The industrial size venue is the site of 'Battle of The Bands', a yearly music festival which has seen a number of local bands make a name for themselves in a popular setting.

Drysdale has several primary and high schools, including Saint Ignatius College, the senior campus of Bellarine Secondary College, and a campus of Christian College. The local football club is the Drysdale Hawks, who play Australian Rules Football and compete in the Bellarine Football League. The Hawks were formed in 1879 and have won 15 premiership titles, the last in 2010. The Bellarine Rail Trail also runs through the town. The local cricket club is also named the Drysdale Hawks.

== History ==
The town is named after Anne Drysdale. She and Caroline Elizabeth Newcomb had the estate "Coriyule" which sits above the township. The area was known as McLeod's Waterholes and Bellarine. A township began to develop in the late 1840s and a Post Office (known as Bellarine until 1862) opened on 1 January 1855. From 1902 until 1951 Murrudoc Post Office to the west operated in the area also known as Murradoc. The railway reached the local railway station from South Geelong on the way to Queenscliff in 1879, and remained in Victorian Railways service until 1976. It is now the western terminus of the tourist orientated Bellarine Railway. The station lies next to Lake Lorne, an important regional site for waterbirds.

Until abolished in 1993, the Rural City of Bellarine council seat was in Drysdale.

=== Heritage listed sites ===
Drysdale contains several Victorian Heritage Register listed sites, including:

- Drysdale Hotel
- Drysdale Railway Station
- The Stock Pound
- Drysdale State School
- Drysdale War Memorial

== Notable residents ==
- Anne Drysdale
- Caroline Elizabeth Newcomb

== Gallery ==
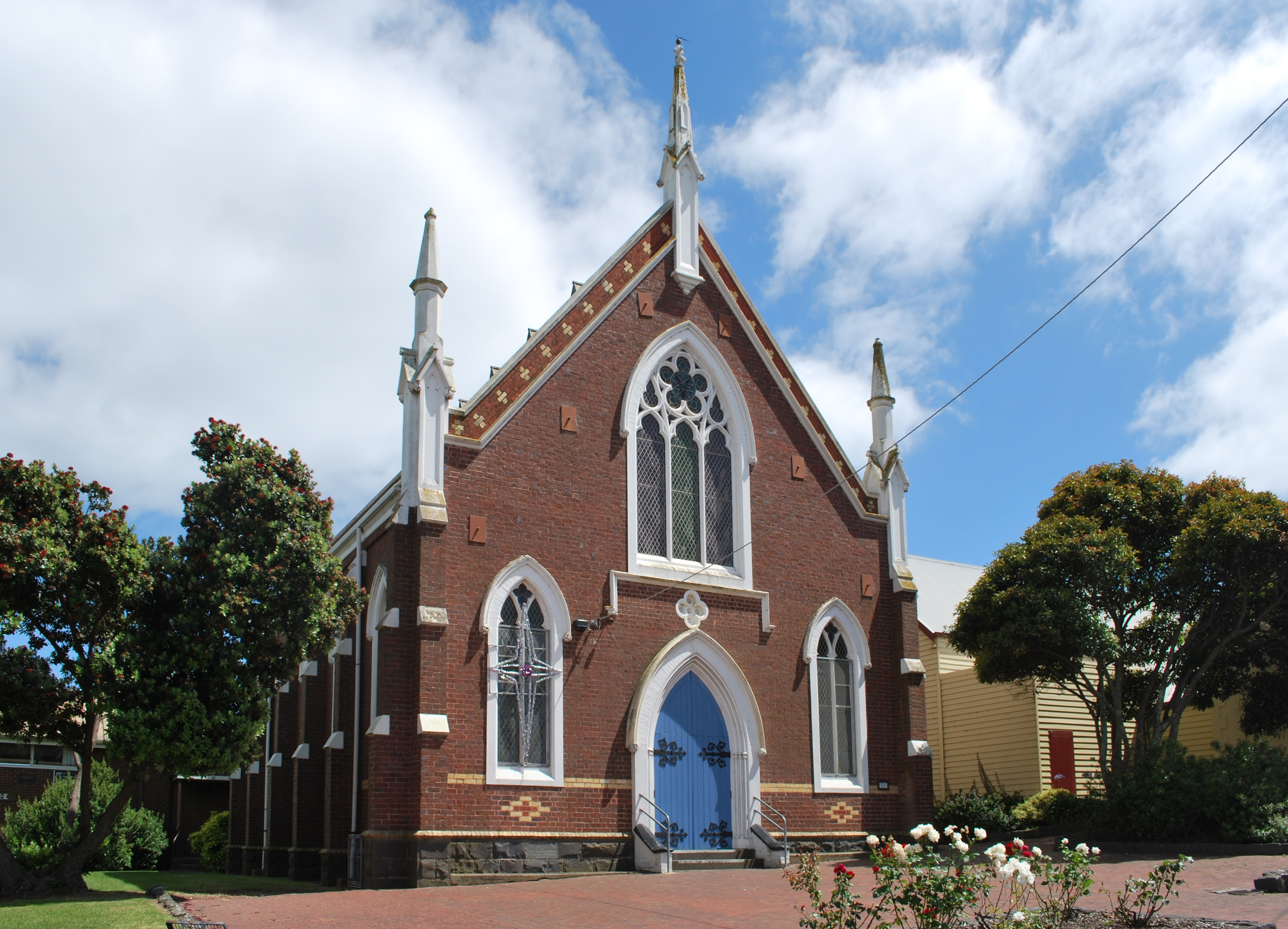
Uniting church

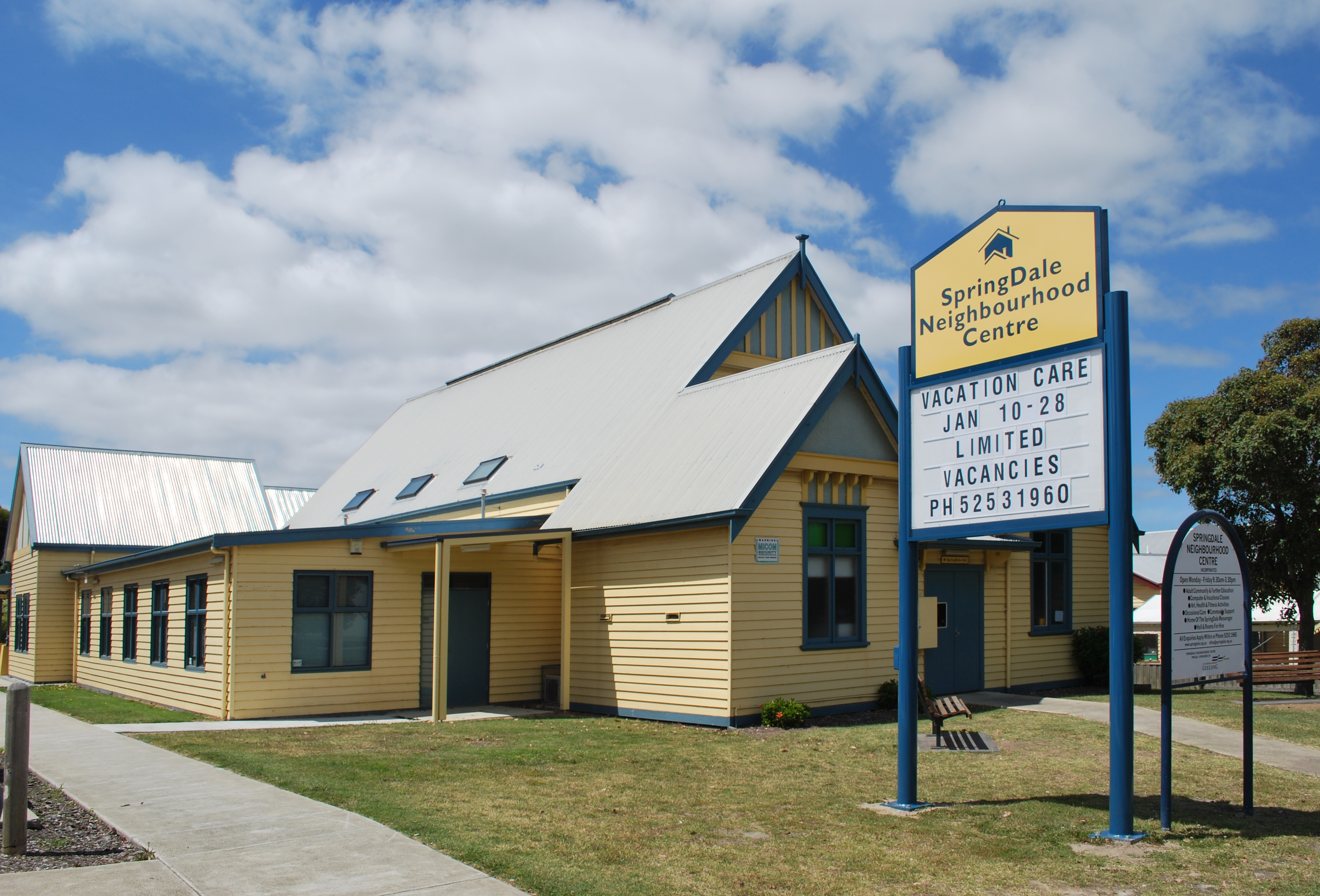
Community Centre

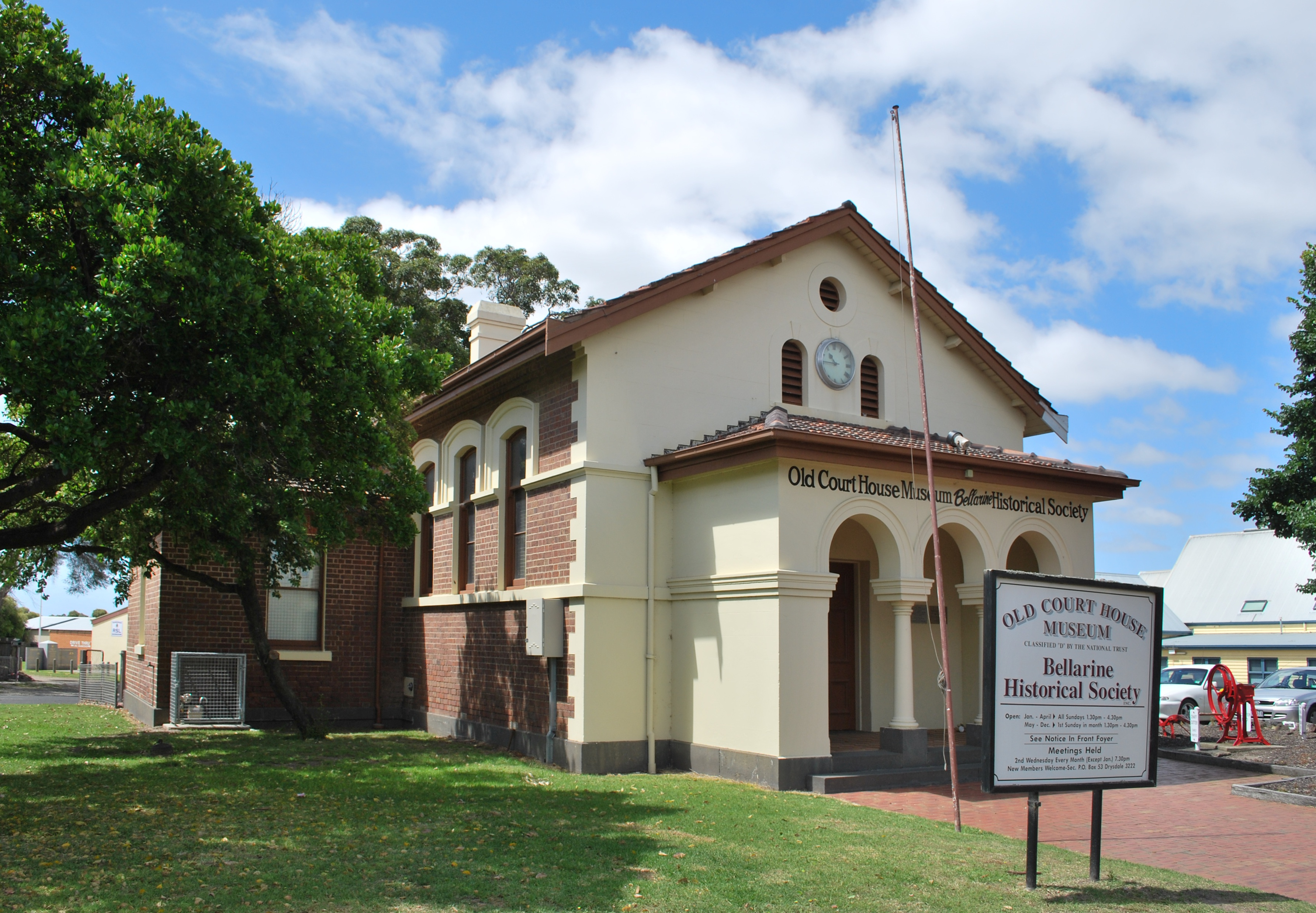
Court House

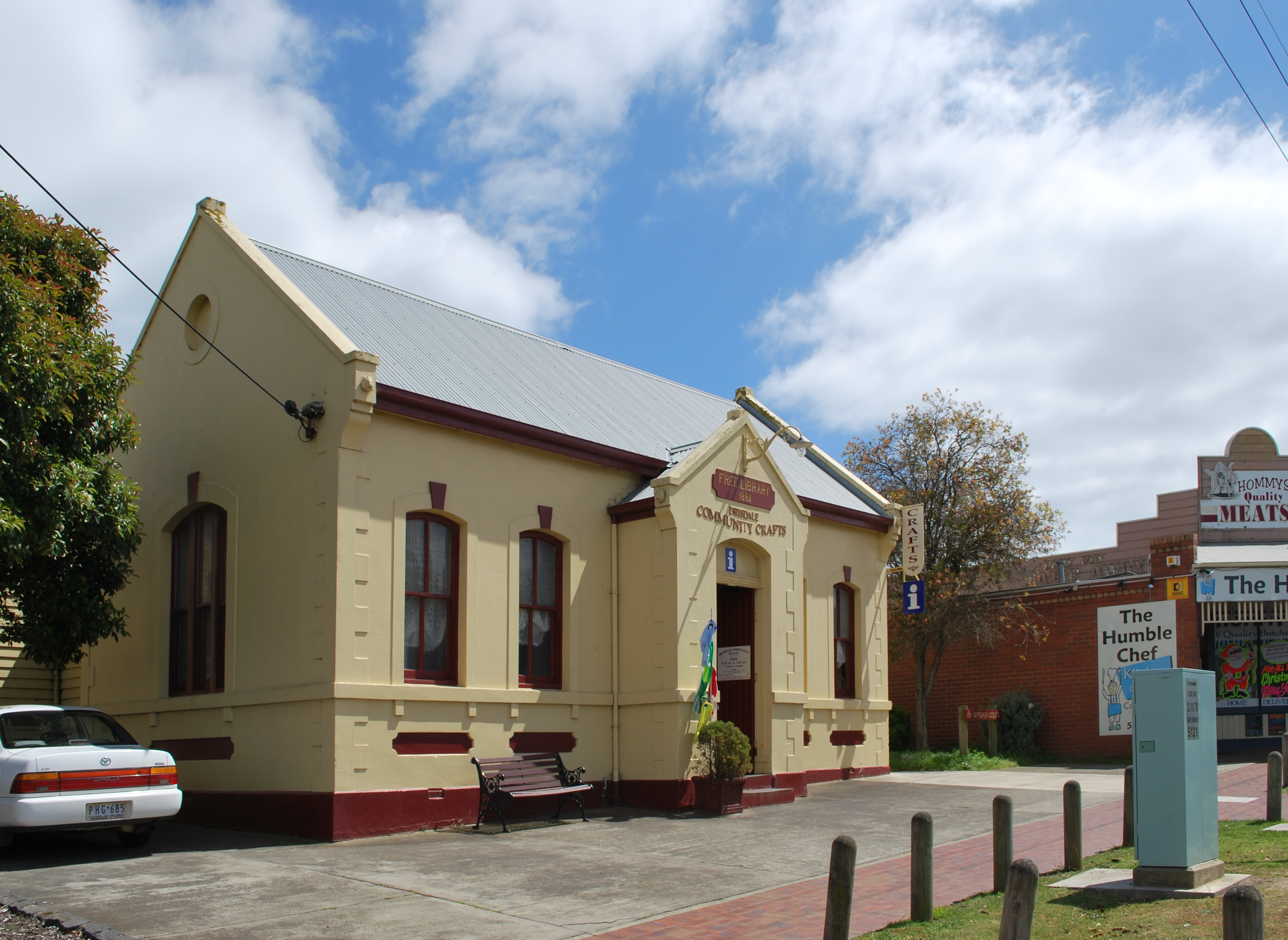
Drysdale Free Library

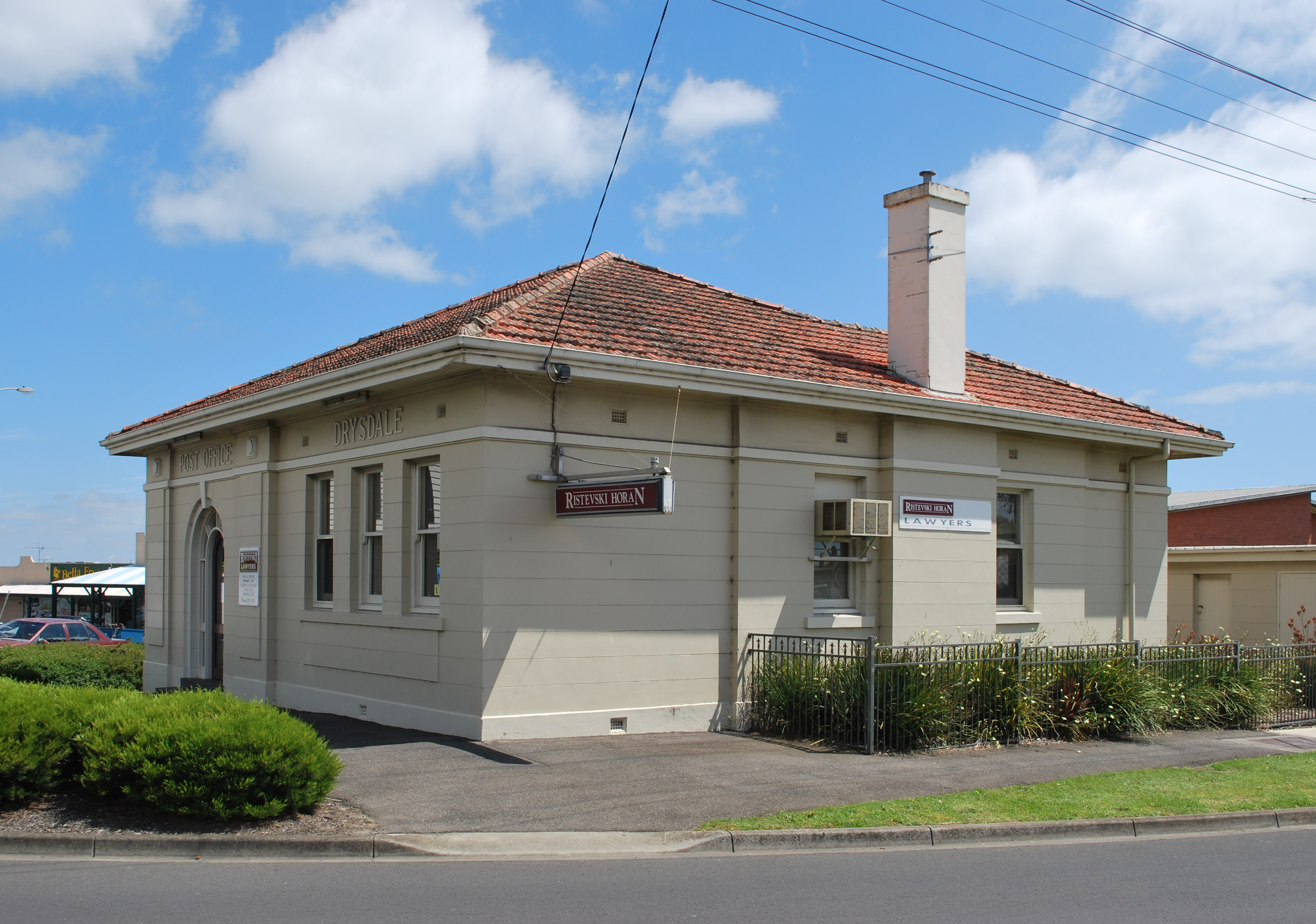
Post Office

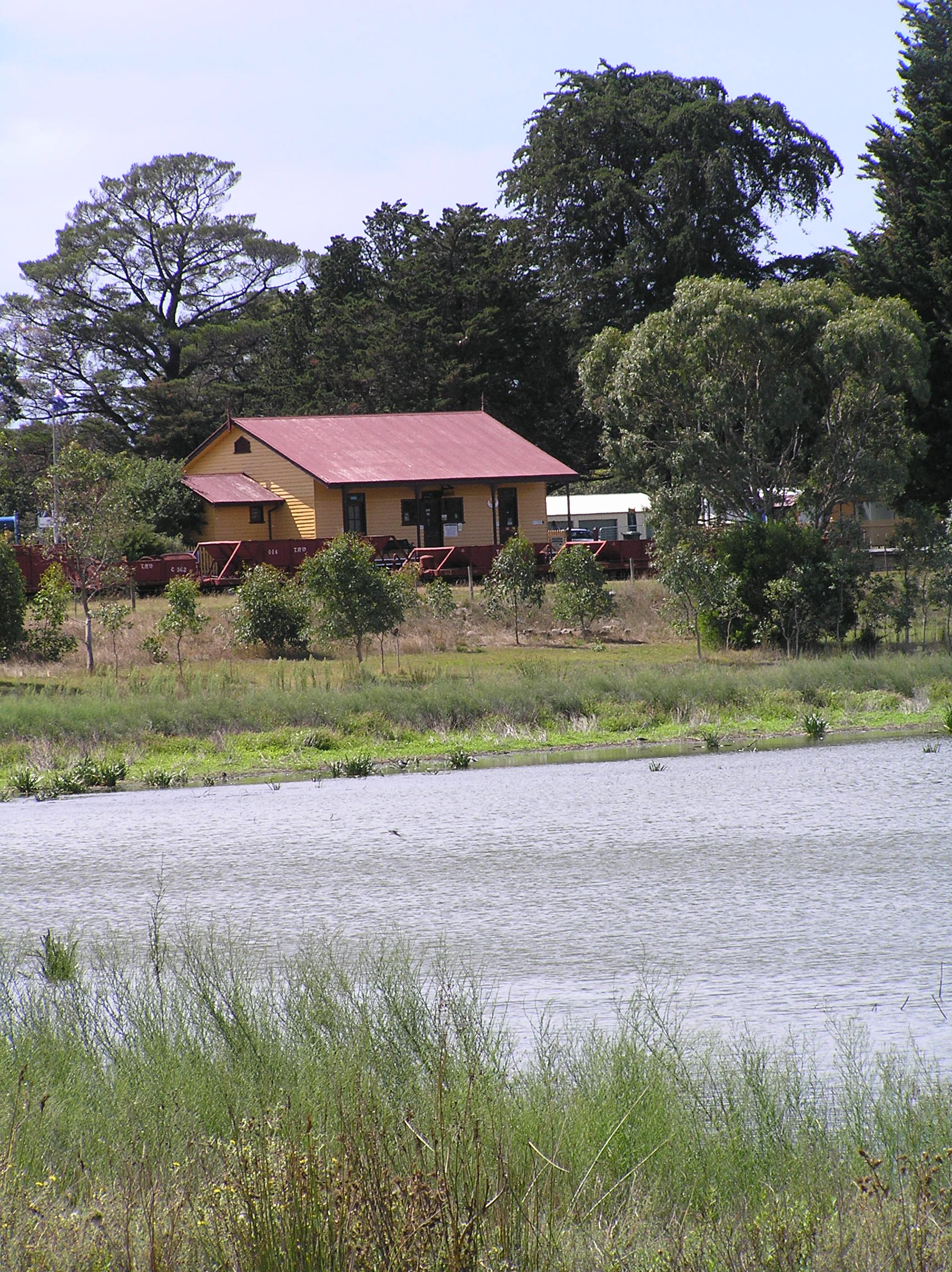
Railway Station
