= Geelong Botanic Gardens =

Botanical gardens in Victoria, Australia

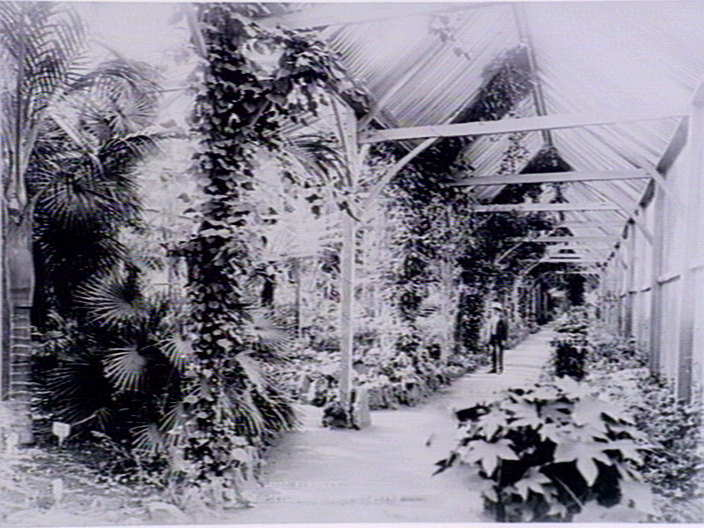
- Fernery at the Geelong Botanic Gardens, (1892-1902)
- Interactive map of Geelong Botanic Gardens
- Type: Botanical
- Location: Geelong, Victoria
- Coordinates: 38.1500°S 144.3781°E
- Area: 7 hectares (17 acres)
- Opened: 1851
- Owner: City of Greater Geelong
- Collections: Pelargonium (OPCAA registered collection), Salvia (OPCAA registered collection), Heritage Roses, Indigenous Plants- Regional collection
- Website: https://app.geelongcity.vic.gov.au/gbg/

The Geelong Botanic Gardens is a botanical garden in the city of Geelong, Victoria, Australia. The gardens are located within Eastern Park on the eastern outskirts of the central business district. They were established in 1850 and are the fourth oldest botanic garden in Australia.

== History ==
The gardens were first set aside as a public space in 1850, taking up the whole of today's Eastern Park. The botanic gardens were later isolated to a fenced-off area in the centre of the park.

While the origin story of the Geelong Botanic Gardens can be traced back to as early as 1850, the land it was built upon has an even richer history. This history of the land dates back over 25,000 to 60,000 years ago when it was under the care of the Wathaurong people, an indigenous Australian community who are the traditional owners of the land.

Despite being cleared for public use in 1850, a committee of management wasn't formed until 1852, and its first curator wasn't appointed until 1857. The first appointed curator was a 19th-century explorer known as Daniel Bunce who tended to it for 14 years before his death in 1872. In that time, Bunce developed the land to contain a conservatory, a glasshouse, an aviary, and an inbuilt lake. Furthermore, Bunce planted a vast network of shrubberies along the carriageways to serve as a windbreak for the attendees.

The next curator was John Raddenberry who served the gardens from 1872 till 1896. In his term as curator, he implemented a thatched summerhouse and some rotundas. Yet the most iconic inclusion during his time as curator was a timber fernery, complete with an inbuilt pond surrounded by various foliage and ferns.

This Fernery was opened in October 1885. It was 120 feet (37 meters) long, 60 feet (18 meters) wide and was located where the George M. Hitchcock Fountain now stands. The fernery was extended in 1886 by an octagon 60 feet (18 meters) high, with a pond located underneath. A third section was added in 1887, taking the total length to 300 feet (91 meters). By 1920 the ferns were becoming overgrown, and the fernery was demolished some time after World War II because the wooden structure was falling into disrepair.

By the late 1800s facilities included a large wooden fernery, three miles (4.8 km) of carriage drives, an aviary, monkey house, and a fish hatchery.

The original park was much larger than its current form, spanning the full 200 acres of eastern hill as opposed to its current 17 acres which remain fenced off from the rest of Eastern Park.

The Geelong botanic gardens and its surrounding Eastern Park are listed on the Victorian Heritage Register for their vast assortment of plant life. Furthermore, the gardens also contain singular trees listed under the National Trust of Australia (Victoria) Register of Significant Trees, as well as some of Geelong's original heritage buildings such as the statue of Queen Victoria, the Cabman's Shelter, and the Market Square fountain.

== Irrigation system ==
As the Geelong Botanic Gardens is home to plants from around the world, their water requirements can differ vastly. Furthermore, the Geelong Botanic gardens is situated in the middle of eastern park, a large public space close to the Geelong waterfront and home to a vast arboretum. This arboretum landscape surrounding the gardens has a much lower water requirement then a majority of the imported and indigenous plants which reside within its walls, as these plants have originated from differing climate conditions.

To ensure all plant life meets its necessary survival requirements, the gardens house a large irrigation system capable of outputting up to 28 megaliters of water annually. This output is also capable of adjusting to the climate which particularly helps during the summer months depending on the incoming rainfall and temperature.

== 2006 water restrictions ==
In the summer of 2006 Australia was at the height a of crippling drought. As a response to the crisis, stage 4 water restrictions were enforced upon the Barwon area which prevented residential, commercial, and public gardens from being watered. However, an exemption was granted to the Geelong Botanic Gardens to allow mains water to be used, this was mainly due to the fact that the gardens house heritage trees and collections of plants used for scientific purposes.

Despite this, the garden was still negatively affected by the drought. Every part of the gardens irrigation system was throttled to output the minimum volume of water needed for the gardens to survive, thus stunting the photosynthesis, respiration and transpiration processes in the plant life affected. This caused minor wilting, discoloration and even death in some specimens, but by and large the garden survived and now thrives to this day.

In 2011, the Australian government provided funding to the city of greater Geelong to develop a storm water treatment facility that would allow the storage and reuse of storm water. The plan was conceived in 2008 as an answer to the drought crisis of the current day and involved the capture of storm water throughout the region of East Geelong for redistribution throughout Eastern Park and the Geelong Botanic Gardens. This required a full restructuring of the irrigation system that would connect to the 250,000 litre storage tanks that would be placed at the edge of the gardens. While this reconstruction was underway, all plant life previously connected to the old irrigation system would be analysed to further improve the efficiency of the new irrigation system's design. The full restructuring of the irrigation systems commenced in 2013 and finalized in 2017 along with the development of the storm water treatment facility.

== 21st century gardens ==
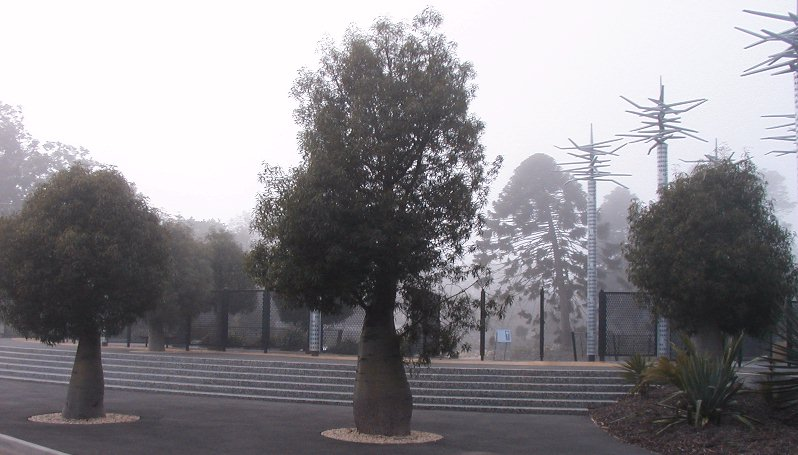
Bottle tree entrance

The gardens were renovated in 2002, with a new section for arid-climate and local native plants opened. It features a dramatic entrance with Queensland Bottle Trees (Brachychiton rupestris), combining architectural plants with modern garden sculptures.

The species Livistona mariae and Macrozamia macdonnellii were feature plants in an exhibition of Central Australian flora.

== See also ==
- Johnstone Park
