= East Geelong =

East Geelong Geelong, Victoria
- Coordinates: 38.1620°S 144.3802°E
- Population: 3,862 (2016 census)
  - Density: 1,246/km^{2} (3,230/sq mi)
- Postcode(s): 3219
- Area: 3.1 km^{2} (1.2 sq mi)
- LGA(s): City of Greater Geelong
- State electorate(s): Geelong
- Federal division(s): Corio
Suburbs around East Geelong:
Corio Bay	Corio Bay	Corio Bay
Geelong CBD	East Geelong	Newcomb
South Geelong	Thomson	Newcomb

East Geelong is a residential suburb of Geelong, Victoria, Australia. At the 2016 census, East Geelong had a population of 3,862.

The post office opened on 6 June 1921. An earlier Post Office dating from 1871 was later renamed Moolap West.

The 81-hectare Eastern Park is located in East Geelong. It is Geelong's premier regional park and an important recreation focus for central Geelong. The Geelong Botanic Gardens are located at its centre.

East Geelong has an Australian Rules football team competing in the Geelong & District Football League. Golfers play at the course of the East Geelong Golf Club at Eastern Gardens.

== Heritage listed sites ==
East Geelong contains a number of heritage listed sites, including:

- 141 Ormond Road, Eastern Cemetery Gatehouse
- 1-55 Garden Street, Eastern Park and Geelong Botanic Gardens
- 1-55 Garden Street, First Geelong Customs House
- Hearne Parade, Limeburners Point Lime Kiln Complex

== Population ==
In the 2016 Census, there were 3,862 people in East Geelong. 82.4% of people were born in Australia. The next most common country of birth was England at 2.9%. 87.4% of people spoke only English at home. The most common responses for religion were No Religion 35.9%, Catholic 28.7% and Anglican 9.5%.
