= The Recruit (Australian TV series) =

Reality TV series about Australian rules football

- Genre: Sports; Reality
- Presented by: Ryan Fitzgerald (S1), (S2 - Finale)
- Starring: Michael Voss (S1); Ben Dixon; Mick Malthouse (S2); Darren Burgess; Leigh Russell
- Country of origin: Australia
- Original language: English
- No. of seasons: 2
- No. of episodes: 20

Production
- Running time: 60 minutes
- Production companies: McGuire Media; The Media Tribe

Original release
- Network: Fox8
- Release: 16 July 2014 – 21 September 2016

Related
- Cricket Superstar

The Recruit is an Australian rules football reality television series that aired on Fox8 from 16 July 2014 to 21 September 2016.

The winner of the show was drafted to an Australian Football League (AFL) club's rookie list via a special draft in September at the end of each series. They were listed as a Category B rookie (i.e. the same as an international player or someone who had not played for more than three years).

The first series was hosted by Ryan Fitzgerald and featured Michael Voss as the head coach. Mick Malthouse replaced Voss as head coach for the second series. Other key members of the program are former Hawthorn player Ben Dixon as Assistant Coach, Leigh Russell as the Elite Performance Manager, and Port Adelaide fitness coach Darren Burgess as the High Performance Coach.

Contestants must not have been previously selected to an AFL club list, be over 20 years of age, and have not played in a senior state league in the past two years.

On 18 September 2014, the series was renewed for a second season. Originally scheduled to air in 2015, it was later announced it would air in 2016 due to multiple factors, one of which was the departure of Voss as coach.

On 3 August 2015, it was announced Gary Buckenara would be a scout in the second season, and that Fitzgerald will not return as host (although he did return as host for the live finale). The second and final season began on 20 July 2016.

== Series overview ==
Season	Episodes	Originally aired	
Season	Episodes	Season premiere	Season finale
1	10	16 July 2014	17 September 2014
2	10	20 July 2016	21 September 2016

== Season 1 ==
=== Contestants ===
The final squad of 13 players was selected from 50 contestants.

Name	Club	State/Country	Position	Comments	Status	References
Johann Wagner	Tasman FC	SA	Forward	Had signed with Central District	Winner, signed with Port Adelaide	The Recruit, Fox Sports Pulse
Bradie Foster	Aspley AFC	Qld	Ruck/forward	Former captain of the AIS volleyball team	Runner-Up	The Recruit, Fox Sports Pulse
Chris Moreland	Geelong West St Peters FC	Victoria	Midfield		Delisted in Episode 10	The Recruit, Geelong Advertiser
Reece Maxwell		WA	Utility	Played basketball for Gillette College	Delisted in episode 9	The Recruit
Padraig Lucey		Ireland	Ruck		Introduced in episode 3, Delisted in episode 9. However he was signed by Geelong.	The Recruit
Ryan Semmel	Rye Football Club	Victoria	Midfield/forward	2013 Cheatley Medalist	Delisted in episode 9	The Recruit, Fox Sports Pulse
Brendan Goss	Old Xaverians	Victoria	Forward		Delisted in episode 8	The Recruit, Fox Sports Pulse
Nathan Jackel	Darley FC	Victoria	Midfield		Delisted in episode 7	The Recruit, Fox Sports Pulse
Mark Cisco		USA	Forward/ruck		Introduced in episode 3 Delisted in episode 6	The Recruit, US combine
Waylon Manson	Billiluna Community	WA	Ruck/forward	Highly rated 2011 AFL draft prospect	Delisted in episode 6	The Recruit, WAFL
Ryan Smith	Lancelin Ledge Point FC	WA	Centre half-forward/Centre half-back	Previously played for East Perth FC Son and brother of golfers Wayne and Kristie Smith	Delisted in episode 5	The Recruit, Fox Sports Pulse
Daniel Johncock	South Launceston FC	Tasmania	Midfield		Delisted in episode 4	The Recruit,
Michael Hutchinson	Aspley AFC	Queensland	Backline		Delisted in episode 4	The Recruit, AFL draft profile
James Brackin	Macquarie University AFC	NSW	Centre half-forward		Delisted in episode 3	The Recruit, Fox Sports Pulse
Tyrone Armitage	Manly Warringah FC	NSW	Half-forward/midfield	2013 Phelan Medalist	Delisted in episode 2	The Recruit, Fox Sports Pulse

=== Season 1 episodes (2014) ===
No.	Title	Original air Date	Overnight Australian viewers
1	"The Cut"	16 July 2014	119,000
2	"Drop Zone"	23 July 2014	94,000
3	"Leap of Faith"	30 July 2014	88,000
4	"Child's Play"	6 August 2014	105,000
5	"Survival of the Fittest"	13 August 2014	123,000
6	"Stranded at Sea"	20 August 2014	130,000
7	"Follow the Leader"	27 August 2014	88,000
8	"Recruits at War"	3 September 2014	119,000
9	"Swimming with the Sharks"	10 September 2014	133,000
10	"The Draft"	17 September 2014	162,000

== Season 2 ==
=== Contestants ===
The final squad of 15 players was selected from 50 contestants.

Name	Age	Club	League	Hometown	Position	Status	References
Matt Eagles	26	Yeronga South Brisbane FC	Queensland FA	Morningside, Queensland	Full forward / ruck	Winner, signed with Brisbane Lions	The Recruit
Daniel Cox	21	Cable Beach FC	West Kimberley FA	Broome, WA	Midfield / half-forward	Runner-Up	The Recruit
Jordan Treloar	23	Heidelberg FC	Northern FL	Macleod, Victoria	Centre half-forward	Delisted in Episode 10	The Recruit
Jayden Kelly	27	North Broken Hill FC	Broken Hill FL	Broken Hill, NSW	Midfield	Delisted in Episode 9	The Recruit
Jackson Sketcher	24	Noble Park FC	Eastern FL	Melbourne, Victoria	Half-back	Delisted in Episode 9	The Recruit
Jack Dimery	23	East Coast Eagles	Sydney AFL	Quakers Hill, NSW	Midfield / half-back	Delisted in Episode 8	The Recruit
Darren Allen	21	Lindenow FC	East Gippsland FL	Lindenow, Victoria	Midfield / half-forward	Relinquished his position in the competition in Episode 7	The Recruit
Justin Van Unen	26	Mt Eliza FC	Mornington Peninsula Nepean FL	Nunawading, Victoria	Full forward	Delisted in Episode 6	The Recruit
Brady Egan	21	Rye FC	Mornington Peninsula Nepean FL	Rye, Victoria	Wing / half-forward	Delisted in Episode 5	The Recruit
Dillan Jones	23	Saints FC	Newman FL	Newman, WA	Forward	Delisted in Episode 5	The Recruit
Rhett Coots	21	Rupertswood FC	Riddell District FL	Melbourne, Victoria	Half-back	Delisted in Episode 5	The Recruit
Jeconiah "Jay Jay" Peni	20	Balwyn FC	Eastern FL	Balwyn, Victoria	Wing	Delisted in Episode 4	The Recruit
Shylo Smith	25	Essendon Doutta Stars	Essendon District FL	Point Cook, Victoria	Midfield	Delisted in Episode 3	The Recruit
Jason Williams	22	Diggers Rest FC	Riddell District FL	Sunbury, Victoria	Half-forward / half-back	Delisted in Episode 2 due to injury	The Recruit
Fabian Brancatisano	22	Pyramid Hill FC	Loddon Valley FL	Kealba, Victoria	Wing / half-forward	Delisted in Episode 1	The Recruit

=== Season 2 episodes (2016) ===
No.	Title	Captain's challenge	Captain's challenge winner	Original release date	Australian viewers (millions)
1	"Episode 1"	Run around The Tan and kayak the Yarra River	Rhett Coots	20 July 2016	118,000
2	"Episode 2"	Abseil down the wall of the Gordon Dam in Tasmania	Jay Jay Peni	27 July 2016	106,000
3	"Episode 3"	Run a football clinic for children in Darwin, Northern Territory	Darren Allen	3 August 2016	102,000
4	"Episode 4"	Walking a tightrope across Etihad Stadium with a football to drop on a target	Jack Dimery	10 August 2016	97,000
5	"Episode 5"	Discus, long jump and relay race with Little Athletics children	Matt Eagles	17 August 2016	75,000
6	"Episode 6"	Race through a tough obstacle course	Jayden Kelly	24 August 2016	95,000
7	"Episode 7"	V8 Supercar tyre change	Matt Eagles	31 August 2016	76,000
8	"Episode 8"	Helicopter water escape	Jackson Sketcher	7 September 2016	78,000
9	"Episode 9"	Holding a 10 kg football above head	Matt Eagles	14 September 2016	86,000
10	"Final - Live draft"	N/A	N/A	21 September 2016	150,000

=== Guests ===
Guest	Episode
Anthony Koutoufides	1
Brent Harvey	1
Corey Enright	1
Dermott Brereton	1
Dustin Fletcher	1
Jason Akermanis	1
Ian Thorpe	4
Jonathan Brown	4, 9
Stephanie Rice	4
Cathy Freeman	5
Barry Hall	6, 9
Ryan Fitzgerald	6
Paul Licuria	7
David Reynolds	7
Lauryn Eagle	8
Shane Warne	8
Brendan Fevola	9
Kevin Sheedy	9

== See also ==
- List of Australian television series
