= Geoff Everett (footballer) =

Australian rules footballer

Personal information
- Born: 20 December 1960 (age 65)
- Original team: Warrandyte
- Height: 180 cm (5 ft 11 in)
- Weight: 80 kg (176 lb)

Playing career^{1}
Years	Club	Games (Goals)
1980–1982	Fitzroy	15 (1)
- ^{1} Playing statistics correct to the end of 1982.

Geoff Everett (born 20 December 1960) is a former Australian rules footballer who played with Fitzroy in the Victorian Football League (VFL).

Everett came to Fitzroy from Warrandyte and made his league debut in the final round of the 1980 VFL season, against Carlton at Princes Park. He played the opening six rounds of the 1981 season, then didn't feature again for the rest of the year. In 1981 he made eight appearances, which included a win over Hawthorn, in which Everett tagged Leigh Matthews and was successful in blunting him.

In 1986, Everett coached Melton to a premiership in the Riddell District Football League.

Since then he has moved to Thailand and was coach of the Thailand Tigers Australian rules football team.
