= Gisborne Giants Football Netball Club =

Sports club in Australia

Gisborne Giants

Names
- Full name: Gisborne Giants Football Netball Club
- Nickname: Giants

Club details
- Founded: 2016
- Colours: Orange Charcoal White
- Competition: Riddell District Football Netball League
- Ground: Macedon Ranges Sports Precinct

Uniforms
Home

Other information
- Official website: https://www.gisbornegiantsfnc.club/

The Gisborne Giants Football Netball Club, nicknamed the Giants is an Australian rules football and Netball club located in the town of Gisborne, Victoria.

The club currently competes in the Riddell District Football Netball League

== Club History ==
Starting only as a junior club, the Gisborne Giants were established in 2016 when it became evident that the Gisborne Rookies Junior Football Netball Club could not accommodate the number of people wanting to play. So to ease the strain off the Rookies a new club had to be established, so the Giants were born.

The club performed well in its first few years, winning junior premierships in football and netball across various age groups.

For the first time ever, in 2022 the Giants fielded a football team in a senior division competing in the Under 19.5 competition. The next year in 2023 saw the Under 19.5 football team finish minor-premiers but unfortunately go down in the grand final to close rival, Macedon. The year also saw the club field a side in the Under 19 netball competition for the first time. In 2024 the Under 19.5 football team finished minor-premiers for the second year running and won the grand final by 25 points against Kyneton securing the club its first premiership in a senior division. The Giants also fielded a senior netball side in the D-grade competition for the first time as well. They went on the win the grand final against Romsey by 17 goals. The year also saw a record number of junior football and netball teams competing in grand finals for the Giants.

With the completion of the Giants new home ground, the Macedon Ranges Sports Precinct, 2025 will see the club have a fully fledged senior football and netball program fielding sides in all divisions.

== Premierships ==
=== Football ===
Riddell District Football Netball League

Under 19.5

- 2024, 2026

=== Netball ===
Riddell District Football Netball League

C grade

- 2025

D grade

- 2024, 2025
