= Cooper Duff-Tytler =

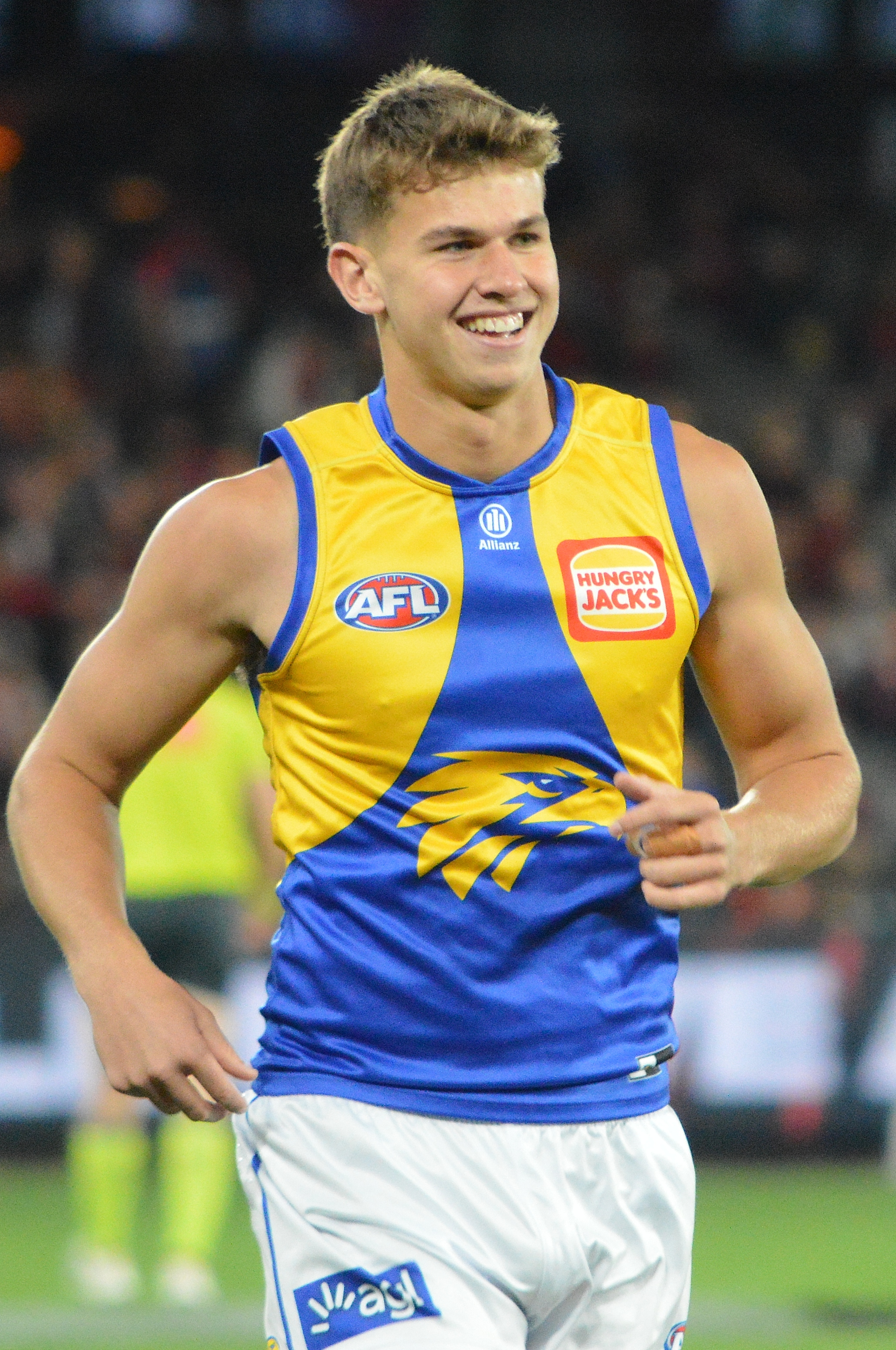
- Duff-Tytler in May 2026

Personal information
- Born: 22 August 2007 (age 19)
- Original teams: Woodend Hesket (RDFNL); Calder Cannons (Talent League)
- Draft: No. 4, 2025 AFL draft
- Debut: Round 1, 2026, West Coast vs. Gold Coast, at Carrara Stadium
- Height: 200 cm (6 ft 7 in)
- Position: Ruck/Key Forward

Club information
- Current club: West Coast
- Number: 21

Playing career^{1}
Years	Club	Games (Goals)
2026–	West Coast	14 (4)
- ^{1} Playing statistics correct to the end of round 22, 2026.

Cooper Duff-Tytler (born 22 August 2007) is a professional Australian rules footballer who plays for the West Coast Eagles in the Australian Football League (AFL).

== Junior football and basketball career ==
Duff-Tytler played both Australian rules football and basketball growing up. In 2023, he won a gold medal for Australia in basketball at the 2023 FIBA U16 Asian Championship. He played for Keilor Thunder in the NBL1 South basketball league.

Duff-Tytler began playing Australian rules football with the Woodend Junior Football Netball Club in the Riddell District Football Netball League. He also represented his school, Penleigh and Essendon Grammar School. In 2025 he co-captained the school's AGSV Boys' First Football side as they won the Premiership.

Duff-Tytler played for the Calder Cannons in the Talent League. In 2025, he averaged over 20 disposals, 17.4 hitouts and a goal per game. He also represented Vic Metro in the Under 18 Championships in 2025, where he averaged 14.5 disposals and 14 hitouts a game.

== AFL career ==
Duff-Tytler was selected by the West Coast Eagles with pick 4 of the 2025 AFL draft. He received the guernsey number 21. He made his debut in round 1 of the 2026 AFL season.

== Personal life ==
Duff-Tytler is of Sri Lankan descent on his father's side. His grandparents immigrated to Australia in 1973. He grew up supporting Hawthorn.

Duff-Tytler attended high school at Gisborne Secondary College and Penleigh and Essendon Grammar School.

== Statistics ==
Updated to the end of round 22, 2026.

Legend
G	Goals	K	Kicks	D	Disposals	T	Tackles
B	Behinds	H	Handballs	M	Marks	H/O	Hit-outs

Season	Team	No.	Games	Totals								Averages (per game)								Votes
Season	Team	No.	Games	G	B	K	H	D	M	T	H/O	G	B	K	H	D	M	T	H/O	Votes
2026	West Coast	21	14	4	10	59	70	129	28	39	57	0.3	0.7	4.2	5.0	9.2	2.0	2.8	4.1	0
Career			14	4	10	59	70	129	28	39	57	0.3	0.7	4.2	5.0	9.2	2.0	2.8	4.1	0
