= Calder Cannons =

Names
- Full name: Calder Cannons Footy Factory
- Nickname: Cannons

2026 season
- After finals: 10th
- Home-and-away season: 5th

Club details
- Founded: 1995; 31 years ago
- Colours: Orange Red Black
- Competition: Talent League
- Premierships: Talent League (6) 2001, 2003, 2004, 2007, 2009, 2010
- Ground: Highgate Recreation Reserve, Craigieburn

Other information
- Official website: https://www.facebook.com/profile.php?id=100063918974285

The Calder Cannons is an Australian rules football club from Melbourne, Australia. The club competes in the Talent League, the Victorian Statewide Under-18s competition, and fields squads in the Under-15s, Under-16s and Under-18s. The club was formed in 1995 after the need for two more metropolitan clubs. The geographic catchment area for the club is the north western suburbs of Melbourne extending to cover the Macedon Ranges area.

== Honours ==
- Premierships (6): 2001, 2003, 2004, 2007, 2009, 2010
- Runners-up (3): 2002, 2006, 2014
- Minor Premiers (4): 2003, 2004, 2011, 2014
- Wooden Spoons: Nil

=== Talent League Girls ===
- Premierships (1): 2017
- Runners-up (1): 2019

== Performances ==
The club has been a strong competitor since its inception, and in 2006 lost in the final to eventual premiers the Oakleigh Chargers at the MCG. They won the competition in 2001, 2003, 2004 and 2007, and have appeared in 6 out of the last 7 grand finals.

== Club information ==
The club trains and play home matches at the Highgate Recreation Reserve (known since 2014 as RAMS Arena) in northern Craigieburn. It was previously based at the Coburg City Oval in Coburg.

Former Collingwood footballer and Copeland Trophy winner, Robert Hyde, coached the Cannons from 1996 to 2006. The club's best and fairest award is called the Robert Hyde medal, in honour of Hyde. Currently The club is the Feeder Club to the Coburg Football Club in the VFL

== Players drafted from Calder Cannons ==
Many notable players in the Australian Football League have been recruited from the Cannons.

- 1995 – David Round, Darren Milburn, Ashley Fernee
- 1996 – Mark Kinnear, Jason Johnson, Marcus Barham, Mark Johnson
- 1997 – Marcus Baldwin, George Bakoulas, Jamie Cann
- 1998 – Jude Bolton, Teghan Henderson
- 1999 – Paul Koulouriotis, Ezra Bray, Paul Chapman, Ryan O'Keefe, Adam Pickering, David Johnson
- 2000 – Jordan Bannister
- 2001 – Brent Reilly, James Kelly, David Rodan, Andrew Welsh, Dane Swan, Jordan Barham, Scott Howard, Adan Winter
- 2002 – Bo Nixon, Tom Lonergan, Brad Murphy, Cameron Wright, Cameron Hunter, Ryan Crowley, Daniel Sipthorp
- 2003 – Brock McLean, David Trotter, Zac Dawson, Brent Hartigan, Ben Clifton, Adam Bentick
- 2004 – Lynden Dunn, Matthew Little, James Ezard, Ivan Maric, Jesse W. Smith, Dean Limbach, Adam Iacobucci, Eddie Betts, Jesse D. Smith, Ben Jolley, Nick Becker
- 2005 – Richard Douglas, Matthew White, Lachlan McKinnon, James Wall, Shane Neaves, Tim O'Keefe
- 2006 – Jarryd Allen, Peter Faulks
- 2007 – Addam Maric, Darcy Daniher, James Polkinghorne, Mitchell Farmer, Dean Putt, Aaron Kite, Phil Smith, Ashley Arrowsmith, Jeremy Laidler
- 2008 – Jackson Trengove, Shaun McKernan, Marcus White, Thomas German
- 2009 – Jake Melksham, Daniel Talia, Jake Carlisle, Anthony Long, Robert Hicks, Thomas Hunter
- 2010 – Dion Prestia, Matthew Watson, Mitch Wallis, Cameron Guthrie, Tom Liberatore, Luke Mitchell, Jordan Schroder, Josh Toy
- 2011 – Brandon Ellis, Tom Sheridan, Daniel Markworth, Michael Talia, Fraser Dale, Hal Hunter
- 2012 – Jonathan O'Rourke, Lachie Plowman, Liam McBean, Matthew Dick, Rory Atkins, Sean Gregory, Joe Daniher
- 2013 –
- 2014 – Paul Ahern, Peter Wright, Jake Lever, Touk Miller, Matthew Goodyear, Jayden Foster, Damien Cavka, Roarke Smith, Reilly O'Brien
- 2015 – Nick O'Kearney, Callum Moore, Tom Wallis
- 2016 – Mitchell Lewis, Ben Ronke, Zach Guthrie
- 2017 – Noah Balta
- 2018 – Rhylee West, Jack Bytel, Curtis Taylor, Lachlan Sholl
- 2019 – Harrison Jones, Francis Evans, Sam Ramsay, Lachlan Gollant
- 2020 – Matthew McLeod-Allison, Josh Eyre, Cody Brand
- 2021 – Josh Goater, Zac Taylor
- 2022 – Harry Rowston
- 2023 – Hugo Garcia
- 2024 – Isaac Kako, Harry O'Farrell, Patrick Said, Jayden Nguyen
- 2025 – Cooper Duff-Tytler, Adam Sweid, Hussien El Achkar
