= Melton Central Football Club =

Australian rules football club known as "Blues"

Melton Central
- Full name: Melton Central Football Club
- Nickname: Blues
- Sport: Australian rules
- Founded: 1996
- League: Riddell District Football League
- Home ground: Arnold’s Creek Reserve
- President: Paul Sinclair

Strip
- Blue with white emblem

The Melton Central Football Club, known as the "Blues", is an Australian rules football club based in the satellite city of Melton, 35 km west of Melbourne. The club is affiliated with the Riddell District Football League.

Formed by the RDFL when it became obvious that the two other Melton-based sides (Melton and Melton South) were on the brink of leaving the competition to play in the Ballarat Football League. The RDFL wanted to keep representative side from the growing Melton urban area.

Melton Central competed alongside two larger football clubs in the area during its time in the Riddell District Football League. The club's best season came in 2003, when it reached the Preliminary Final.

The most recent Premiership was in 2009 when Melton Central won the Reserves Grand Final.

== Results ==
Year	Place	Wins	Draws	Losses	Percentage	Reached finals
2012	6th	9	1	8	104.40%	Yes
2013	7th	8	0	8	95.51%	No
2014	10th	5	0	11	63.24%	No
2015	12th	2	2	14	50.80%	No
2016	11th	2	1	14	52.68%	No
2017	8th	7	0	9	66.74%	No
2018	9th	6	0	10	98.08%	No
2019	7th	7	0	9	113.41%	No

== Community ==
The club is a part of a number of projects aimed at improving awareness of charities and promotion of having a healthy lifestyle.

They are currently a part of the Good Sports program, which targets local sporting clubs to "build a healthier sporting nation". They currently have level 2 accreditation as a part of the program.

They also support the Call to Arms charity, which focuses on supporting males who have survived cancer. They have been supporting the charity since 2008, and have raised over $1500.

== Team Song ==
We are the Navy Blues,

We are the old, dark, navy blues

We're the team that never lets you down

We're the only team from Melton town

With all the champions

They like to send us

We'll keep our end up

And they will know that they've been playing

Against the famous old dark blues

Go Centrals!

== Books ==
- History of Football in the Bendigo District - John Stoward - ISBN 9780980592917
- 100 Years of Football in the Riddell District - John Stoward
