= Kyneton Women's Football Club =

Names
- Full name: Kyneton Women's Football Club
- Nickname(s): Wedge-Tailed Eagles, Wedgies, Eagles

Club details
- Founded: Late 2024; 2 years ago
- Colours: Teal White Black
- Competition: Central Victoria Football League
- Premierships: EDFL (1): 2025

Other information
- Official website: kwfc.com.au

The Kyneton Women's Football Club (KWFC), nicknamed the Wedge-Tailed Eagles or the Wedgies, is an Australian rules football club based in the Victorian town of Kyneton. The club was formed in 2024 as a breakaway from the Kyneton Football Netball Club (KFNC).

From 2026, the club will compete as the Wedge-Tailed Eagles Football Club in the Central Victoria Football League (CVFL). Pending the approval of the Macedon Ranges Shire Council, the club will play its home matches at Woodend Racecourse Reserve.

== History ==
=== Background ===
The Kyneton Football Netball Club (KFNC), nicknamed the Tigers, introduced a women's team into the Victorian Women's Football League (VWFL) in 2015. The team entered West Division, but failed to win a match in its first season and finished last on the ladder. After moving to Goldfields Division, Kyneton was again winless in 2016.

Following the disbandment of the VWFL, Kyneton was an inaugural club in the Northern Country Women's Football League (NCWFL) in 2017, winning its first match in round 2 against Kerang. The club moved to the Central Victoria Football League (CVFL) in 2018.

In 2023, Kyneton moved to the Riddell District Football Netball League (RDFNL) women's competition. The club won the 2023 premiership but lost the 2024 grand final, facing Macedon on both occasions.

=== Breakaway club ===
According to KWFC, members of the women's team faced poor behaviour from the male members of the club, with players criticising the lack of equitable resources and the condition of changing rooms. In March 2025, KWFC president Natalie Korinfsky described it as a "horrible, volatile environment", while KFNC denied allegations.

The final straw was a raffle which was scheduled at the same time as the 2024 women's grand final. Korinfsky stated that KFNC "actively encouraged all the members to stay at the clubrooms [...] while we were playing our grand final in front of the opposition's crowd". The RDFNL stated in 2026 that the raffle was scheduled in January 2024, while the date of the women's grand final was not known until March 2024.

The Kyneton Women's Football Club was officially formed in late 2024, with around 30 players joining the new club. Representatives from the RDFNL and Mount Alexander Falcons Football Club met with KWFC representatives on 17 December 2024 to discuss the KWFC playing as Mount Alexander's second women's team. However, the RDFNL was contacted by the KWFC in January 2025 to say that an application for a new team for the 2025 season would be submitted.

The CVFL and the Ballarat Football Netball League (BFNL) both stated that the KWFC had missed the deadline to join their respective competitions in 2025, while the RDFNL denied KWFC's application to contest as a standalone team. As a result, KWFC joined the Gisborne Football Netball Club to compete as Gisborne-Kyneton United in the Essendon District Football League (EDFL) for the 2025 season. The joint team was undefeated and won the 2025 Division 2 grand final, defeating Taylors Lakes Football Club by 64 points. The KFNC did not field a senior women's team in 2025.

=== 2026 season application ===
On 24 July 2025, a meeting was held between the RDFNL and the KWFC. According to the RDFNL, the KWFC was informed that the KFNC intended to field a senior women's team in 2026, which would force the KWFC to change its name if it competed in the RDFNL. It was suggested by the RDFNL that the club change its name to the Wedge-Tailed Eagles Football Club, with Woodend Racecourse Reserve as a possible home ground.

In October 2025, the CVFL Advisory Committee unanimously supported an application from KWFC to affiliate with the CVFL for the 2026 season. The RDFNL appealed the decision and AFL Victoria upheld the appeal on 11 December 2025, preventing the KWFC from entering the CVFL.

RDFNL president Brenton Knott was alleged to have made comments that the situation with the KWFC was "not about footy, it's about grooming and gender weirdness". In a statement released on 6 February 2026, the RDFNL described the alleged comment as "falsified, photoshopped and doctored", and confirmed that both Knott and the league would "begin the legal process of proceeding with defamation cases" against the KWFC, Not All Clubs Media and the Midland Express.

On 17 February 2026, KWFC announced that it would be able to compete in the CVFL as the "Wedge-Tailed Eagles Football Club", after the RDFNL said it would not further appeal the club's application. The RDFNL also announced that Andrew Power, its vice-president, had resigned after making social media remarks about the club which included "vulgar comments and jokes about being bisexual".

KWFC has received public support from Victorian premier Jacinta Allan, federal Labor Party MP Lisa Chesters and Animal Justice Party MP Georgie Purcell.
