= Harry Tampling =

Australian rules footballer

Personal information
- Full name: Harry William Tampling
- Born: 22 November 1896; Macedon, Victoria
- Died: 10 August 1982 (aged 85); Macedon, Victoria
- Original team: Macedon
- Height: 183 cm (6 ft 0 in)

Playing career^{1}
Years	Club	Games (Goals)
1920	Melbourne	1 (0)
1924	St Kilda	6 (0)
Total		7 (0)
- ^{1} Playing statistics correct to the end of 1924.

Harry William Tampling (22 November 1896 – 10 August 1982) was an Australian rules footballer who played with Melbourne and St Kilda in the Victorian Football League (VFL).

== Death ==
He died at Macedon, Victoria on 10 August 1982.
