= Bill Shaw (Australian footballer) =

Australian rules footballer, born 1915

Personal information
- Full name: William Clive Shaw
- Born: 25 April 1915; Romsey, Victoria
- Died: 5 October 1994 (aged 79); Romsey, Victoria
- Original team: Romsey
- Height: 185 cm (6 ft 1 in)
- Weight: 76 kg (168 lb)
- Position: Follower

Playing career^{1}
Years	Club	Games (Goals)
1939	Footscray	2 (0)
- ^{1} Playing statistics correct to the end of 1939.

William Clive Shaw (25 April 1915 – 5 October 1994) was an Australian rules footballer who played with Footscray in the Victorian Football League (VFL), who was recruited from Romsey.

Shaw later served in the Australian Army during World War II.

Shaw won the Riddell District Football Association best and fairest award, the Bowen Medal in 1947, 1949 and 1953, playing for Romsey.
