= Ray Taylor =

Ray Taylor may refer to:

- Ray Taylor (director) (1888–1952), American film director
- Ray Taylor (English footballer) (1930–2012), footballer for Huddersfield Town, Southport Frickley and Denaby United
- Ray Taylor (Australian footballer) (born 1947), Australian rules footballer for North Melbourne
- Ray Taylor (politician) (1923–2015), American politician in the state of Iowa
- Raymond Taylor (1910–?), American baseball catcher in the Negro leagues
- Ray Washington Traylor Jr. (1963–2004), American professional wrestler who used the ring name Big Boss Man
- Ray Taylor (EastEnders), fictional character in EastEnders, played by Dorian Lough in 2005
- Ray Taylor (EastEnders: Perfectly Frank), fictional character played by Tony Osoba in the 2003 spin-off EastEnders: Perfectly Frank
- Ray Taylor, a character in The Angry Hills
