= Wallan Football Club =

Wallan FNC

Names
- Full name: Wallan Football Netball Club
- Nickname: Magpies

Club details
- Founded: 1891
- Colours: Black and White
- Competition: Riddell District Football League since 2008
- Premierships: (9) 1907, 1908, 1909, 1914, 1977, 1985, 1989, 1992, 2021.
- Ground: Wallan Recreation Reserve Wallan, Victoria

Other information
- Official website: http://www.wallanmagpies.com.au

The Wallan Football Netball Club, nicknamed the Magpies, is an Australian rules football club located 45 km north of Melbourne in the town of Wallan and is affiliated with the Riddell District Football League and wears black and white vertical stripes.

== History ==
The club appears to of played its first game of Australian Rules football in 1891 against the Kilmore Rose Football Club.

== Football Competitions Timeline ==
- 1891 - 1895: Club active, playing some intermittent football matches against other local sides.
- 1896 - Power Trophy
- 1897 - 1906: Club active, playing some intermittent football matches against other local sides.
- 1907 - 1911: Central Mernda Football Association
- 1912: Club active, but did not play any competition football.
- 1913 - 1915: Midlands District Football Association. Association abandoned in July 1915 due to war enlistments from footballers.
- 1916 - 1918: Association / Club in recess due to World War I
- 1919 - 1920: Mernda Football Association
- 1923 - 1931: Bourke Evelyn Football League
- 1935 - 1939: Hume Highway Football Association
- 1940 - 1945: Association / Club in recess due to World War II
- 1945 - 1946: Hume Highway Football Association
- 1947 - 1953: Riddell District Football League
- 1954 - 1964: Panton Hill Football League
- 1965 - 2001: Riddell District Football League
- 2002 - 2006: Diamond Valley Football League
- 2007 - 2007: Northern Football League
- 2008 - 2024: Riddell District Football League

== Football Premierships (9) ==
Seniors

- Central Mernda Football Association
  - 1907, 1908, 1909
- Midlands Football Association
  - 1914
- Riddell District Football League - Division One
  - 1985
- Riddell District Football League - Division Two
  - 1977
  - 1989
  - 1992

== Runners Up (4) ==
- Central Mernda District Football Association
  - 1910
- Midlands Football Association
  - 1913
- Riddell District Football League - Division Two
  - 1984
- Riddell District Football League - Division One
  - 1998, 2000, 2019

== Football League Best & Fairest Winners ==
Seniors

- Riddell District Football League
  - 1952 - Ken Cleve *
  - 1971 - Les Benjamin
  - 1982 - Ian Benjamin
  - 1998 - Gavin Langborne
  - 1999 - Dean Fitzpatrick
  - 2001 - Brett Spencer
  - 2018 - Jesse Davies
  - 2021 - Ricky Schraven
  - 2022 - Steven Boyall
- 1952: Ken Cleve (Wallan) tied with Ray Russell (Lancefield) on 14 votes, but received the runners up award and has never received a retrospective "co-winners" medal from the RDFL.

== Leading Goalkickers ==
Seniors

- Riddell District Football League
  - 1970: Ian Benjamin 44
  - 1972: Greg Wood 130
  - 1973: Greg Wood 179
  - 1976: Pat Delaney 111
  - 1977: Pat Delaney 133
  - 1984: Bernie Laffin 63
  - 1991: David Fowler 78

== Highest Score ==
Wallan 56.25.361 (v North Fawkner 1.2.8) – Riddell DFL – 1997

== Most goals in a game ==
34 – David Fowler – Wallan (v North Fawkner) – Riddell DFL – 1997

== Books ==
- History of Football in the Bendigo District - John Stoward - ISBN 9780980592917
- 100 years of Football in the Riddell District - John Stoward
