= Lancefield Football Club =

Rules football club in Lancefield, Australia

Lancefield FNC

Names
- Full name: Lancefield Football Netball Club
- Nickname: Tigers

2023 season
- Home-and-away season: 8th, 4 wins, 12 losses

Club details
- Founded: 1872; 154 years ago
- Colours
- Competition: Riddell District Football League
- Premierships: (16) 1903, 1904, 1907, 1910, 1923, 1924, 1932, 1946, 1949, 1952, 1958, 1966, 1995, 1996, 2004, 2009
- Ground: Lancefield Park Lancefield, Victoria (capacity: 5,000)

Uniforms
Away

Other information
- Official website: Lancefield FNC website

The Lancefield Football Netball Club, nicknamed the Tigers, is an Australian rules football club located 61 km north of Melbourne in the town of Lancefield. It is affiliated with the Riddell District Football League.

== History ==
The Lancefield Football Club was formed in 1873 and one of its earliest published match review was against Kyneton in July 1879.

In 1890, Riddell's Creek and Lancefield played Footscray, with Footscray: 5.9 - 39 defeating Riddell's Creek / Lancefield: 4.6 - 30

== Competition Timeline ==
- 1902 - 1903: Lancefield / Romsey Football Association
- 1904: Kilmore Football Association
- 1905: Club active, no competition football. Lancefield was refused entry into the Kyneton District Football Association.
- 1906: Club active, but no competition football
- 1907: Central Dalhousie Football Association
- 1908: Club active, but no competition football
- 1909: Club active, but no competition football
- 1910 - 1911: Romsey District Football Association
- 1912 - Dalhousie Football Association
- 1913: Lancefield applied to join the Riddell FA, but were refused.
- 1914: Lancefield applied to join the Riddell FA, but were refused again. Club active, no competition football.
- 1915: Romsey & District Football Association. Lancefield applied to join the Riddell FA, but were refused again
- 1916 - 1918: Club in recess due to World War One
- 1919: Lancefield FC reformed. Club active, but no competition football.
- 1920 - 2024: Riddell District Football Association

== Football Premierships ==
Seniors

- Assorted District football competitions
  - 1888, 1890, 1894, 1895, 1899, 1911
- Romsey / Lancefield Football Association
  - 1903 - Lancefield: 7.8 - 50 defeated Gisborne: 4.6 - 30
- Kilmore Football Association
  - 1904
- Central Dalhousie Football Association
  - 1907 - Lancefield: 7.4 - 46 d Kilmore: 4.4 - 28
- Romsey District Football Association
  - 1910 - Lancefield: 3.7 - 25 d Romsey: 2.1 - 13
- Riddell District Football League
  - 1923 - Lancefield: 7.5 - 47 d Romsey: 3.9 - 27
  - 1924 - Lancefield: 8.13 - 61 d Macedon: 7.4 - 46
  - 1932 - Lancefield: 15.6 - 96 d Kilmore: 10.11 - 71
  - 1946 - Lancefield: d ?
  - 1949 - Lancefield: 11.5 - 71 d Sunbury: 10.6 - 66
  - 1952 - Lancefield: 17.18 - 120 d Kilmore: 15.7 - 97
  - 1958 - Lancefield: 5.7 - 37 d Sunbury: 4.8 - 32
  - 1966 - Lancefield: 10.9 - 69 d Romsey: 7.8 - 50
- Riddell District Football League - Division Two
  - 1995, 1996
- Riddell District Football League
  - 2004, 2009

== Football Runners Up ==
Seniors

- Kyneton District Football Association
  - 1896
- Gisborne District Football Association
- Romsey / Lancefield Football Association
  - 1902 - Romsey: 2.8 - 20 d Lancefield: 0.2 - 2
- Dalhousie Football Association
  - 1912 - Darraweit: 5.7 - 37 d Lancefield: 3.7 - 25
- Woodend District Football Association
  - 1930 - Woodend: 6.13 - 49 d Lancefield: 6.11 - 47

Juniors

- Hesket District Junior Football Association
  - 1926: Hesket: 4.12 - 36 d Lancefield: 3.8 - 26

== Football league best & fairest winners ==
Seniors

- Riddell District Football League - Bowen Medal
  - 1952 - Ray Russell
  - 1958 - Keith Shannon
  - 1959 - Bill Shannon
  - 2008 - Tom Waters
  - 2010 - Tom Waters

== VFL/AFL players ==
- 1905 - Frank Caine - Carlton
- 1906 - Harvey Gibson - Carlton
- 1906 - Alexander "Ike" Johnston - Carlton
- 1927 - Jack McCormack - Richmond

== Books ==
- History of Football in the Bendigo District - John Stoward - ISBN 9780980592917

== Links ==
- Lancefield FNC Facebook page
- 1953 - Lancefield FC training photo
