= Jayden Nguyen =

Australian rules footballer (born 2006)

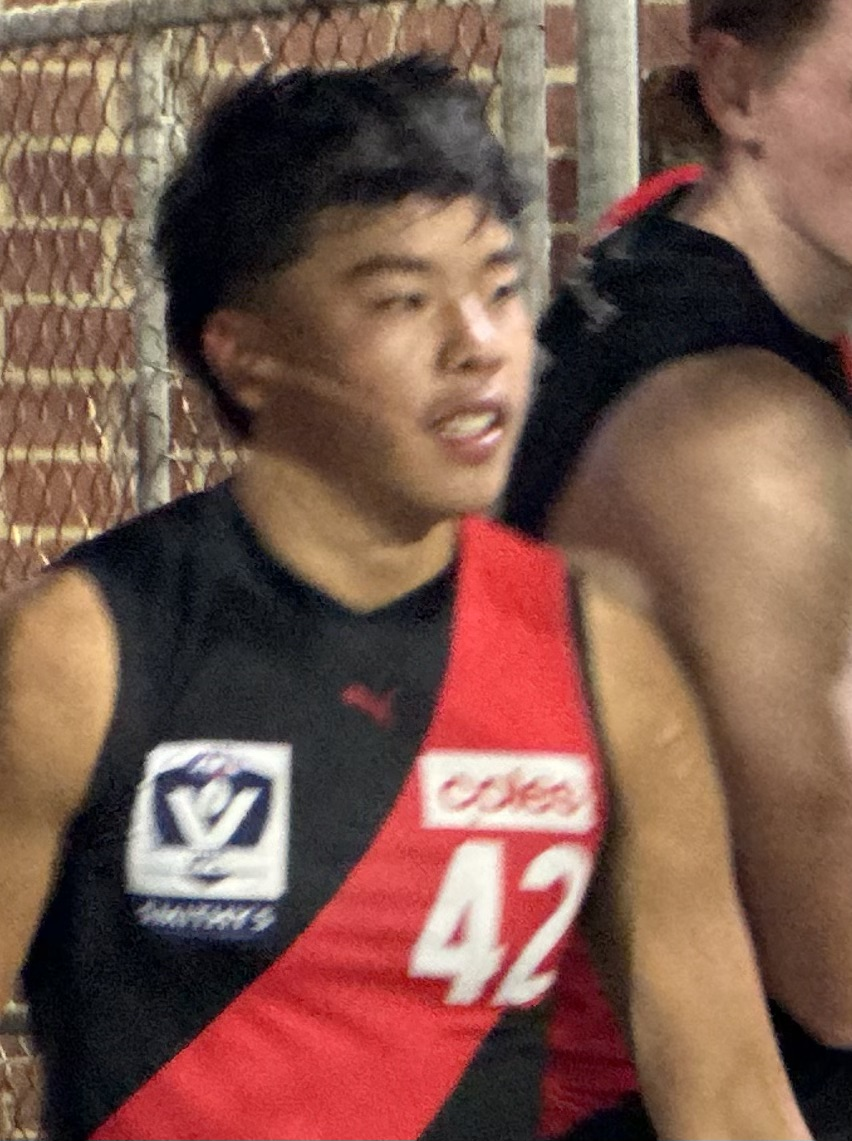
- Nguyen playing in the VFL in 2025

Personal information
- Full name: Jayden Nguyen
- Born: 27 July 2006 (age 20)
- Original teams: Calder Cannons (Talent League), Aberfeldie Football Club
- Draft: Category B rookie selection (2024)
- Debut: Round 21, 2025, Essendon vs. Sydney, at Sydney Cricket Ground
- Height: 178 cm (5 ft 10 in)

Club information
- Current club: Essendon
- Number: 42

Playing career^{1}
Years	Club	Games (Goals)
2025–	Essendon	10 (0)
- ^{1} Playing statistics correct to the end of 2026.

Jayden Nguyen (born 27 July 2006) is a professional Australian rules footballer with the Essendon Football Club in the Australian Football League (AFL).

== AFL career ==
Nguyen was selected by Essendon in the 2025 rookie draft as a Next Generation Academy selection.

During the 2025 season, he made his debut against Sydney in round 21, becoming the first player of Vietnamese descent to play in the AFL. After impressing in the senior team in his first three matches, Nguyen signed a one year contract extension to remain at Essendon in 2026.

Despite impressing as a small defender in his debut season, Nguyen played in Essendon's forward line during the 2026 season. He played five games at AFL level and signed a one-year contract extension at the end of the season to remain at Essendon until 2027.

== Statistics ==
Updated to the end of round 22, 2026.

Legend
G	Goals	K	Kicks	D	Disposals	T	Tackles
B	Behinds	H	Handballs	M	Marks

Season	Team	No.	Games	Totals							Averages (per game)							Votes
Season	Team	No.	Games	G	B	K	H	D	M	T	G	B	K	H	D	M	T	Votes
2025	Essendon	42	5	0	0	19	19	38	11	13	0.0	0.0	3.8	3.8	7.6	2.2	2.6	0
2026	Essendon	42	5	0	2	18	40	58	12	7	0.0	0.4	3.6	8.0	11.6	2.4	1.4	0
Career			10	0	2	37	59	96	23	20	0.0	0.2	3.7	5.9	9.6	2.3	2.0	0
