= Central Victoria Football League =

Women's Australian rules football league

- Founded: 2018; 8 years ago
- No. of teams: 7
- State: Victoria
- Region: Central Victoria
- Current premiers (2026): Castlemaine (5th premiership)
- Most premierships: Castlemaine (5)
- Official website: cvfl.com.au

The Central Victoria Football League (CVFL or CVFLW) is a women's Australian rules football competition based around the Central Victoria region. It includes senior and junior competitions.

== History ==
The Central Victoria Football League was established in 2018, splitting from the Northern Country Women's League (NCWL) which had been formed one year prior. Five teams competed in the inaugural season – Bendigo Thunder reserves, Kangaroo Flat, Kyneton, North Bendigo and Strathfieldsaye. Bendigo Thunder won the 2018 grand final, defeating Strathfieldsaye by 87 points.

In 2019, Eaglehawk and Golden Square joined the CVFL, while Bendigo Thunder withdrew to compete solely in the Northern Football Netball League (NFNL).

No season was held in 2020 due to the impact of the COVID-19 pandemic. The 2021 season – which saw Bendigo Thunder rejoin and Kerang compete for the first time – was also impacted by COVID-19 and curtailed without a finals series being held.

The CVFL introduced junior football in 2022 with a six-team under-14s competition, featuring clubs from the North Central Victoria region. Castlemaine formed its first senior women's team and joined the competition for the 2022 season, while Kangaroo Flat withdrew. The newly formed Mount Alexander Falcons applied to join but were rejected, although they played several CVFL practice matches throughout the year.

Woorinen joined the CVFL in 2023, while Kyneton moved to the Riddell District Football Netball League (RDFNL) and Kerang withdrew. The CVFL reached nine teams for the first time during the 2024 season, when three clubs – Marong, Sandhurst and White Hills – joined the senior competition, with Strathfieldsaye having withdrawn. Woorinen's senior women's team entered recess in 2025.

In October 2025, the CVFL Advisory Committee unanimously supported an application from the Kyneton Women's Football Club (KWFC) – a breakaway from the Kyneton Tigers – to affiliate with the CVFL for the 2026 season. The RDFNL appealed the decision and AFL Victoria upheld the appeal on 11 December 2025, preventing the KWFC from entering the CVFL.

== Clubs ==
=== Current ===
Club	Colours	Nickname	Home Ground	Former league(s)	Est.	CVFL seasons	CVFL senior premierships	
Club	Colours	Nickname	Home Ground	Former league(s)	Est.	CVFL seasons	Total	Most recent
Bendigo		Thunder	Weeroona Oval, Bendigo	NFNL	2011	2021– (Note: While Bendigo's reserve team competed in 2018, their senior team (which became their only team from 2019 onwards) did not join the CVFL until 2021.)	0	–
Castlemaine		Magpies	Camp Reserve, Castlemaine	–	1859	2022–	5	2026
Eaglehawk		Hawks; Two Blues	Canterbury Park, Eaglehawk	–	1880	2019–	0	–
Golden Square		Bulldogs	Wade Street Recreation Reserve, Golden Square	–	1932	2019–	1	2019
Marong		Panthers	Malone Park, Marong	–	1900s	2024–	0	–
Sandhurst		Dragons	Queen Elizabeth Oval, Bendigo	–	1861	2024–	0	–
Wedge-Tailed Eagles		Eagles; Wedgies	Racecourse Reserve, Woodend	EDFL (Note: Competed as Gisborne–Kyneton United under a merged operation with Gisborne Football Netball Club.)	2024	2026–	0	–
White Hills		Demons	White Hills Recreation Reserve, White Hills	–	1924	2024–	0	–

=== Former ===
Club	Colours	Nickname	Home Ground	Former league(s)	Est.	CVFL seasons	CVFL senior premierships		Fate
Club	Colours	Nickname	Home Ground	Former league(s)	Est.	CVFL seasons	Total	Most recent	Fate
Bendigo reserves		Thunder	Weeroona Oval, Bendigo	NCWL	2017 (Note: The Bendigo Women's Football Club was established in 2011; its reserve team was established in 2017.)	2018	1	2018	Withdrew in 2019
Kangaroo Flat		Kangaroos	Dower Park, Kangaroo Flat	–	1890	2018–2021	0	–	Withdrew in 2022
Kerang		Blues	Riverside Park, Kerang	NCWL	1996	2020–2022	0	–	Withdrew in 2023
Kyneton		Tigers	Kyneton Showgrounds, Kyneton	NCWL	1868	2018–2022	0	–	Moved to RDFNL
North Bendigo		Bulldogs	North Bendigo Recreation Reserve, North Bendigo	NCWL	1945	2018–2025	0	–	Entered recess in 2026
Woorinen		Tigers	Woorinen Recreation Reserve, Woorinen	–	1919	2023–2024	0	–	Entered recess in 2025

== Premiers ==
=== Seniors ===
Year	Premiers		Runners-up		Venue	Date	Ref
Year	Club	Score	Club	Score	Venue	Date	Ref
2018	Bendigo reserves (1)	15.12 (102)	Strathfieldsaye (1)	2.3 (15)	Weeroona Oval	26 August 2018	
2019	Golden Square (1)	4.6 (30)	Kangaroo Flat (1)	0.5 (5)	Weeroona Oval	1 September 2019	
2020	Season not contested due to the COVID-19 pandemic						
2021	Premiership not awarded due to the COVID-19 pandemic						
2022	Castlemaine (1)	5.8 (38)	Golden Square (1)	2.7 (19)	Queen Elizabeth Oval	9 September 2022	
2023	Castlemaine (2)	5.2 (32)	Woorinen (1)	1.9 (15)	Queen Elizabeth Oval	1 September 2023	
2024	Castlemaine (3)	8.5 (53)	Golden Square (2)	3.4 (22)	Queen Elizabeth Oval	6 September 2024	
2025	Castlemaine (4)	4.12 (36)	Golden Square (3)	1.3 (9)	Queen Elizabeth Oval	5 September 2025	
2026	Castlemaine (5)	5.8 (38)	Golden Square (4)	3.5 (23)	Queen Elizabeth Oval	4 September 2026	
