= Craigieburn Football Club =

Australian rules football club in Craigieburn, Melbourne

Craigieburn Eagles
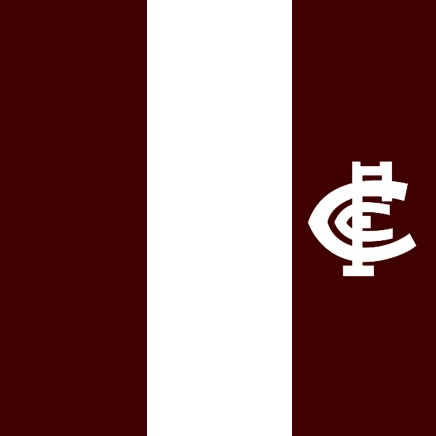

Names
- Full name: Craigieburn Eagles Football Club
- Nickname(s): Eagles, Burners
- Club song: "Glory, Glory for the mighty Brown and White"

2025 EDFL season
- After finals: 3rd (Defeated by Hillside in Prelim (18.7.115)-(8.8.56))
- Home-and-away season: 5th (9-9)
- Leading goalkicker: Tadhg Boyle (23)
- Best and fairest: Jai Robinson

Club details
- Founded: 1967; 58 years ago
- Colours
- Competition: Essendon District Football League
- President: Dom Micallef
- Coach: Jack Carlyon/Cale Bettanin
- Captain: Jamie Gorgievski
- Premierships: (5) 1979, 1993, 2005, 2016, 2019
- Grounds: D.S Aitken Reserve, Craigieburn
- Highgate Reserve Oval 2, Craigieburn

Other information
- Official website: craigieburnfc.com.au

The Craigieburn Football Club is an Australian rules football club and is located 27km north of Melbourne in the township of Craigieburn.

== History ==
After an unsuccessful application in 1970 for entry into the Riddell District Football League for the 1971 season, the club successfully re-applied in 1971 for admission in 1972. The first senior game was against Sunbury in which Craigieburn lost by just 245 points. It began life as an amateur football club with a 21-match losing streak before winning its first match on 3 May 1973 against Romsey, 12.12 (84) to 9.13 (67).

In 1975 the Riddell District Football League split into two divisions, with Craigieburn being cut into this newly formed Second Division, Craigieburn finished the H/A in fourth position with the Seniors and Reserves reaching the Preliminary Final both being defeated by Wallan whilst the Under 17's going through to the club's first Grand Final.

The club's first Senior premiership was the 1979 RDFL Second Division when they defeated Broadford by 47 points.

Promoted to First Division the club was competitive and regularly played finals losing the 1986 Grand Final to Melton.

Craigieburn won their initial First Division RDFL premiership in 1993 defeating Darley by 28 points.

Craigieburn Football Club played in the Riddell District Football League from 1972 until the end of the 2000 season.

The club entered the Essendon District Football League in 2001 and won the 2005 B Grade premiership defeating West Coburg 11.14.80 to 10.12.72.

Since the club's first EDFL premiership in 2005, Craigieburn have won a further 2 premierships in EDFL Division 1, coming in 2016 (Craigieburn: 15.10 - 100 d Tullamarine: 12.8 - 80) and 2019 (Craigieburn: 13.17 - 95 d East Keilor: 7.16 - 58) respectively.

== Football Premierships (5) ==
Seniors

- Riddell District Football League - Second Division
  - 1979 - Craigieburn: defeated Broadford: by 47 points.
- Riddell District Football League - First Division
  - 1993 - Craigieburn: defeated Darley by 28 points
- Essendon District Football League - B. Grade/EDFL Division 1
  - 2005 - Craigieburn: (11.14 - 80) defeated West Coburg: (10.12 - 72)
  - 2016 - Craigieburn: (15.10 - 100) defeated Tullamarine: (12.8 - 80)
  - 2019 - Craigieburn: (13.17 - 95) defeated East Keilor: (7.16 - 58)

=== Reserves ===
- Essendon District Football League - B. Grade/EDFL Division 1
  - 2002
  - 2005

=== Under 18.5s (Previously Under17/18/19) ===
- Essendon District Football League - AGA Under 18.5 Men's Division 1
  - 2003
  - 2014 - Craigieburn: (11.10.76) defeated Hadfield: (9.9.63)
  - 2024 - Craigieburn: (5.3.33) defeated Essendon Doutta Stars: (4.4.28)

=== Under 18.5 Women's ===
- Essendon District Football League - AGA Under 18.5 Women's Division 1
  - 2025 - Craigieburn: (8.7.55) defeated Point Cook Centrals: (4.2.26)

== VFL/AFL players ==
The following footballers played with Craigieburn FC, prior to playing senior VFL / AFL football.

- 2001 - Adam Pickering – Carlton
- 2008 - Mitch Farmer – Port Adelaide , Richmond
- 2010 - Jake Carlisle – Essendon , St Kilda

== Junior Club ==
Formed in 1967 by Craigieburn resident Jim McKessy, competed in the Northern Football Netball League. Later moved to the Essendon District Football League where the juniors compete to this day.
