= Jack Hiscock =

Australian rules footballer

Personal information
- Full name: John William Hiscock
- Born: 1 March 1924; Brighton, Victoria
- Died: 28 May 2007 (aged 83)
- Original team: Sandringham

Playing career^{1}
Years	Club	Games (Goals)
1947-49	Sandringham	51 (125)
1950	Melbourne	4 (3)
1950-53	Sandringham	54 (70)
- ^{1} Playing statistics correct to the end of 1953.

John William Hiscock (1 March 1924 – 28 May 2007) was an Australian rules footballer who played with Melbourne in the Victorian Football League (VFL).

Hiscock was Sandringham's leading goalkicker in 1948 (73) and 1949 (53) before playing with Melbourne in 1950.

Hiscock later had a very successful football career at Trentham, being captain-coach of their 1956 and 1959 Riddell District Football League senior football premiership sides.

Hickcock also won the 1954 and 1960 Riddell District Football League best and fairest award, the Bowen Medal. Hiscock was runner up in the 1957 Bowen Medal too.

Hiscock played sub district cricket for Caulfield Cricket Club.
