= Harvey Gibson =

Australian rules footballer

Personal information
- Full name: Alfred Harvey Gibson
- Born: 9 April 1886; Goodwood, South Australia
- Died: 7 September 1940 (aged 54); Glenelg, South Australia
- Original teams: North Melbourne (VFA), Lancefield,

Playing career^{1}
| Years | Club | Games (Goals) |
| 1906 | Carlton | 1 (0) |
- ^{1} Playing statistics correct to the end of 1906.

Alfred Harvey Gibson (9 April 1886 – 7 September 1940) was an Australian rules footballer who played with Carlton in the Victorian Football League (VFL).
