= Melton South Football Club =

Melton South

Names
- Full name: Melton South Football & Netball Club
- Nickname(s): Panthers

Club details
- Founded: 1973; 52 years ago
- Colours
- Competition: Ballarat Football League
- Ground(s): Melton Recreation Reserve

Uniforms
Home

Melton South Football and Netball Club, nicknamed the Panthers, is an Australian rules football and netball club located in Melton. As of 2025, the club currently competes in Riddell District Football Netball League. They have cross town rivals in the Melton Football Club and the Melton Central Football Club

== History ==
The club was formed in 1973 and commenced in the Riddell District Football League.
The Bacchus Marsh FL and the Ballarat & District FL had merged but the club with its cross town rival Melton opted to join the Riddell District Football League.

In 1997, the stronger clubs ( Darley, Melton, Melton South,& Sunbury) of the Riddell District Football League were transferred to the Ballarat Football League.

There have been a few great footballers to go through the club including, Sean Denham, Ben Haynes and Paul Chambers.

== Football Premierships ==
Seniors

- Riddell District Football League
  - 1994
