= Woodend/Hesket Football Club =

Woodend / Hesket FNC

Names
- Full name: Woodend / Hesket Football Netball Club Inc.
- Nickname: Hawks

2023 season
- After finals: 2nd
- Home-and-away season: 3rd (12 wins, 4 losses, 2 byes)
- Leading goalkicker: Josh Pound (30)
- Laurie O'Brien Medal: Daniel Toman

Club details
- Founded: 1978
- Colours: Gold and Brown
- Competition: Riddell District Football League
- Coach: Alister Rae
- Premierships: 1978, 1983, 2002, 2007
- Ground: Gilbert Gordon Oval Victoria (capacity: 5,000)

Uniforms
Home	Away 1

Other information
- Official website: Woodend/Hesket Football Club website

The Woodend/Hesket Football Club, known as the Hawks, is an Australian Rules Football club playing in the Riddell District Football League.

The club is 65 km north west of Melbourne in the township of Woodend.

The club first played as Woodend-Hesket in 1978 following the merger between Woodend FC and Hesket FC. The Senior Club plays home games at the Gilbert Gordon Oval, Woodend.

The club's main feeder team is the Woodend Junior Football Club (Woodend Hawks) who were established in 1973 and play their home games at the Woodend Racecourse and Recreation Reserve.

== Hesket FC history ==
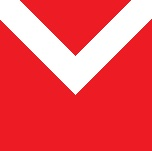
Hesket Club Jumper

Formed in 1873 the Hesket club participated in the local competitions including the Hesket and District Football Association in 1926. Hesket joined the Riddell Football League in 1936.

The colours were red and white. In 1936, Clarrie O'Connor won the Harry O. White medal for the best and fairest player in the Riddell District Football League.

In 1971 the club went into recess after the season, only to reform in 1975 in the RDFL 2nd Division.

The club merged with Woodend in 1978.

=== Football timeline ===
- 1891–Romsey District Football Association
- 1892–1902: Club active, but did not play in any official competitions
- 1903–Romsey Lancefield District Football Association
- 1904–Gisborne District Football Association
- 1905–1909: Club in recess
- 1910–1911: Romsey Football Association
- 1912–Woodend Football Association
- 1913–1914: Club in recess
- 1915–Romsey & District Football Association
- 1916–1920: Club in recess. World War One
- 1921–1922: ? Football Associations
- 1923–Rochford Junior Football Association. Runner up
- 1924–1925: ? Football Associations
- 1926–Hesket District Football Association
- 1927–1930: ? Football Associations
- 1931–1935: Woodend Junior Football Association Runner up: 1932 Runner up: 1935
- 1936–Riddell District Football League.
- 1937–1945: Club in recess. Withdrew from the RDFA in 1937 / World War Two
- 1946–1971: Riddell District Football League
- 1972–1974: Club in recess
- 1975–1977: Riddell District Football League–Division Two
- 1978–Merged with the Woodend Football Club & played in the Riddell District Football League.

==== Football premierships ====
Seniors

- ? Football Associations
  - 1910, 1921, 1925,
- Hesket District Football Association
  - 1926: Hesket: 4.12–36 d Lancefield: 3.8–26
- Riddell District Football League
  - 1960

== Woodend fc history ==
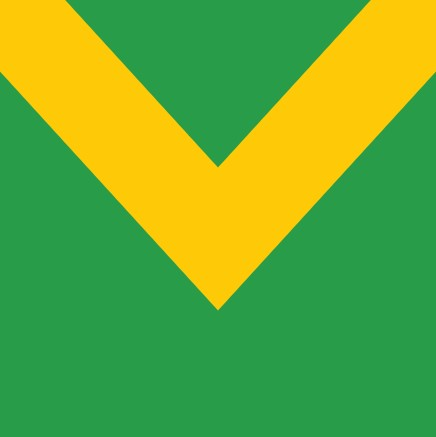
Woodend Club Jumper

The Woodend Football Club was initially formed in 1880 and then reformed in 1895 and participated in the local competitions including the Riddell District Football League from 1912 to 1921, 1923–1939 and from 1953 to 1977.

Mr. N. Jongebloed was President of Woodend Football Club between 1886 and 1905.

In 1889, R. McCubbin won a gold locket as Woodend's best all round player and G. McCubbin won a gold medal for the best back player.

Woodend FC initially played on the Volunteer Reserve, which became the Woodend Racetrack and Recreation Reserve in 1902.

From 1925 Woodend played against local Castlemaine sides until returning to the Riddell DFL in 1953. The colours were navy blue.

Former Woodend player, Percy Bowen played in ten local premierships between 1905 and 1927 and played for 22 consecutive years.

After finishing last in 1977 the club merged with Hesket in 1978.

=== Football timeline ===
- 1880 – 1894: Club active, but did not play in any official competitions.
- 1895 – Woodend Football Association
- 1896 – Kyneton District Football Association
- 1897 – 1898: Club in recess
- 1899 – ? Kyneton District Football Association
- 1900 – 1901: ? Football Association
- 1902 – Romsey Lancefield District Football Association
- 1903 – Kyneton District Football Association
- 1904 – Gisborne District Football Association
- 1905 – Kyneton District Football Association
- 1906 – Gisborne District Football Association
- 1907 – Half Holiday (Wednesday) Football Association
- 1908 – Gisborne District Football Association
- 1909 – 1910: Kyneton District Football Association
- 1911 – 1912: Gisborne District Football Association
- 1913 – Woodend Football Association
- 1914 – 15: Riddell District Football Association
- 1916 – 1919: Association / Club in recess due to World War One
- 1920 – 1921: Riddell District Football Association
- 1922 – Woodend Football League
- 1923 – 1925: Riddell District Football Association
- 1926 – 1929: Kyneton Football League
- 1930 – 1939: Riddell District Football Association
- 1940 – 1941: Castlemaine Football League
- 1942 – 1945: Association / Club in recess due to World War Two
- 1946 – 1952: Castlemaine Football League
- 1953 – 1977: Riddell District Football League
- 1978 – Merged with the Hesket Football Club & played in the Riddell District Football League.

==== Football premierships ====
Seniors

- Other Football Associations
  - 1889, 1893, 1900
- Woodend District Football Association
  - 1895
- Kyneton District Football Association
  - 1896
- Gisborne District Football Association
  - 1904
- Riddell District Football League
  - 1914 – Woodend defeated Riddell
  - 1930, 1931, 1937, 1954, 1964

Runners-up

- Romsey Lancefield District Football Association

1902

Juniors

- Riddell District Junior Football Association
  - 1928 – Woodend: 9.16 – 70 d Gisborne: 4.9 – 33

== Woodend/hesket fnc – football premierships ==
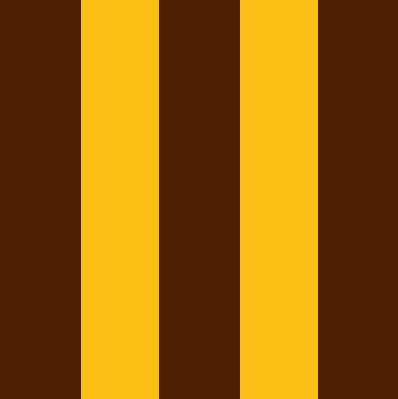
Woodend Hesket Football Club colours

Seniors

- Riddell District Football League – Division Two
  - 1978, 1983
- Riddell District Football League – Division One
  - 2002, 2007

Reserves

- Riddell District Football League
  - 2008

Under 18's

- Riddell District Football League
  - 2003, 2007, 2009, 2011

== Woodend/hesket fnc – netball premierships ==
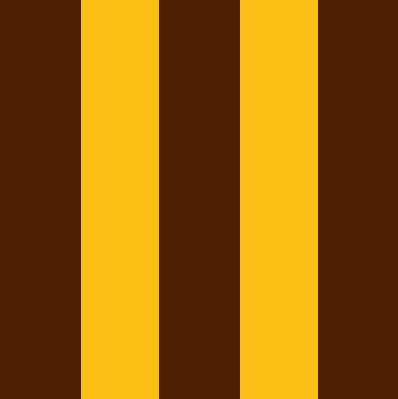
Woodend Hesket Football Club colours

A Grade

- Riddell District Football League – A Grade
  - 2023, 2024

== Books ==
- History of Football in the Bendigo District – John Stoward – ISBN 9780980592917
