= Frank Caine =

Australian rules footballer

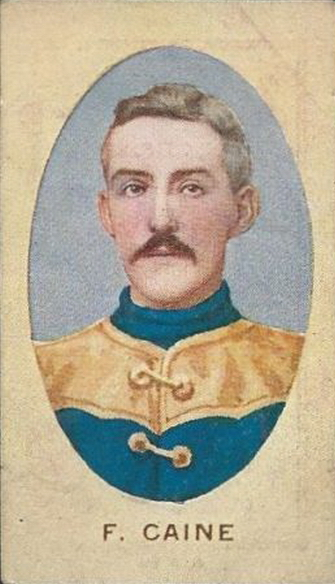
- Cigarette card of Caine in 1910

Personal information
- Full name: Francis Albert Caine
- Born: 28 July 1881; Murtoa, Victoria
- Died: 19 January 1930 (aged 48); South Melbourne, Victoria
- Original teams: Minyip, Lancefield
- Debut: Round 7, 1905, Carlton vs. St Kilda, at Junction Oval
- Height: 184 cm (6 ft 0 in)
- Weight: 86 kg (190 lb)

Playing career^{1}
Years	Club	Games (Goals)
1905–1909	Carlton (VFL)	80 (147)
1910–1911	North Melbourne (VFA)	
1912–1914	Essendon (VFL)	22 (33)
- ^{1} Playing statistics correct to the end of 1914.

Career highlights
- 1910 VFA premiership; 1910 Association leading goalkicker

Frank Caine (28 July 1881 – 19 January 1930) was an Australian rules footballer in the Victorian Football League.

== Football ==
Caine was recruited from Lancefield and made his debut for the Carlton Football Club against St Kilda in Round 7 of the 1905 season. He went on to play 80 games and kick 147 goals for the Blues.

In a huge coup for North Melbourne, Caine was poached from Carlton in early 1910 along with ‘Mallee’ Johnson, Fred Jinks, and Charlie Hammond. He helped North to their third VFA premiership in 1910, and also topped the Association's goalkicking standings for that season, kicking a new record of 75 goals (including finals).

In 1912 Caine moved to Essendon, where he played a further 22 games.
