= Brad Murphy =

Australian rules footballer (born 1984)

Personal information
- Full name: Brad Murphy
- Born: 27 October 1984 (age 42)
- Original team: Calder Cannons
- Height: 189 cm (6 ft 2 in)
- Weight: 83 kg (183 lb)

Playing career^{1}
Years	Club	Games (Goals)
2004–2005	Western Bulldogs	7 (6)
- ^{1} Playing statistics correct to the end of 2005.

Brad Murphy (born 27 October 1984) is an Australian rules footballer who played for the Western Bulldogs in the Australian Football League (AFL) in 2004 and 2005. He was drafted from the Calder Cannons in the TAC Cup with the 33rd selection in the 2002 AFL draft. He played seven games in four seasons at the Bulldogs before he was delisted at the end of the 2006 season.

After leaving the AFL he continued to play, including for the Hoppers Crossing Football Club in the Western Region Football League. More recently the former Western Bulldog Brad Murphy was coaching Melton Football Club. Murphy, who is almost 29 years old, has coached nearby club Hoppers Crossing to the past three under-18 flags in the Western Region Football League. He also captained the Hoppers senior team but has always wanted to coach a senior team. Murphy is very familiar with BFL footy. He grew up in Sunbury but played his junior football with Rupertswood. His grandparents lived in Melton and Murphy would often watch games about the town with them when visiting. Murphy spent four years with the Bulldogs (2003–2006), playing seven AFL games and about 80 in the Victorian Football League with the Bulldogs’ then-affiliate Werribee.
