= Bo Nixon =

Personal information
- Full name: Bowman Nixon
- Born: 25 July 1984 (age 42); Yarrawonga District Hospital
- Original teams: Yarrawonga / Calder Cannons
- Draft: 21st, 2002 AFL draft
- Height: 191 cm (6 ft 3 in)
- Weight: 88 kg (194 lb)

Playing career^{1}
Years	Club	Games (Goals)
2004	Collingwood	3 (0)
2005	Hawthorn	1 (0)
Total		4 (0)
- ^{1} Playing statistics correct to the end of 2005.

Bowman "Bo" Nixon (born 25 July 1984) is a former college captain of Assumption College, Kilmore and Australian rules footballer who played with Collingwood and Hawthorn in the Australian Football League (AFL). Upon completion of his playing career, Nixon graduated with a bachelor of laws degree from Monash University and commenced practicing as a banking lawyer with international law firm, Norton Rose Fulbright.

Nixon was drafted while at the Calder Cannons, but is originally from Yarrawonga. He didn't feature in the 2003 AFL season, when Collingwood were grand finalists, but made three appearances in 2004. At the end of the year he had surgery to remove a malfunctioning kidney.

He was traded to Hawthorn prior to the 2005 season, along with the seventh selection of the 2004 AFL draft, Jordan Lewis, in return for draft picks 10 and 37. His only senior AFL game came in round 16 against the Kangaroos at Docklands and he had 11 disposals. After being delisted he joined Port Melbourne.
