= Mark Hunter (footballer) =

Australian rules footballer

Personal information
- Full name: Mark Hunter
- Born: 3 September 1965 (age 61)
- Original team: Melton
- Height: 181 cm (5 ft 11 in)
- Weight: 77 kg (170 lb)

Playing career^{1}
Years	Club	Games (Goals)
1988–1996	Footscray	130 (10)
- ^{1} Playing statistics correct to the end of 1996.

Mark Hunter (born 3 September 1965) is a former Australian rules footballer who represented Footscray in the Australian Football League (AFL).

Hunter, a product of the Melton Bloods, played both under-19s and reserves level football at the Geelong Football Club. He was delisted by Geelong without playing a senior game but had his hopes of a VFL career revived when he was invited to train with Footscray prior to the 1988 season, after winning the 1987 Riddell District Football League's best and fairest award, the Bowen Medal.

A defender, he slotted straight into the Footscray team in 1988 and over the course of his career would give the club good service, although he missed many games because of hamstring injuries. He had perhaps his best season in 1994 when he had averaged 20 disposals a game from his 22 appearances and had 365 kicks, the fourth most in the league that year.

After retirement he spent a season at Williamstown in 1999 as an assistant coach and a couple of years as a Footscray runner in 2006 and 2007.

He is currently involved in the horse racing industry as a form analyst on the radio and internet.

His son Lachie was recruited by the Bulldogs under the father–son rule in 2012.
