= Riddell Football Club =

Riddell

Names
- Full name: Riddell Football Netball Club
- Nickname(s): Bombers

Club details
- Founded: 1888
- Colours: Black and Red
- Competition: Riddell District Football League
- Premierships: 1905, 1912, 1947, 1970, 1980, 1982, 1990, 1991, 1992, 2005, 2006, 2008, 2010, 2013
- Ground(s): Riddells Creek Reserve Riddell Creek, Victoria

Other information
- Official website: http://www.riddell.sportingpulse.net

The Riddell Football Netball Club, nicknamed the Bombers, is an Australian rules football club located 53 km north west of Melbourne in the town of Riddells Creek affiliated with the Riddell District Football League.

== Premierships ==
Senior Football (15)

- Gisborne Football Association
  - 1905
- Riddell District Football League
  - 1912
  - 1947, 1970, 1980, 1982, 1990, 1991, 1992, 2005, 2006, 2008, 2010, 2013, 2022, 2030

Reserves (2)

- 1982, 2004, 2012

Thirds (3)

- 1966, 2005, 2006, 2012

Netball

- Riddell District Football League
  - A. Grade
    - 2005, 2006, 2007
- B. Grade
  - 2003, 2005 2010
- C. Grade
  - 2010, 2012

== Former players in the AFL ==
- 2008 - Jarryd Allen - St Kilda
- 2012 - Tom Sheridan - Fremantle and GWS

== Website ==
http://www.riddell.sportingpulse.net

== Books ==
- History of Football in the Bendigo District - John Stoward - ISBN 9780980592917
- 100 years of Football in the Riddell District - John Stoward
