= Kilmore Football Club =

Kilmore FNC
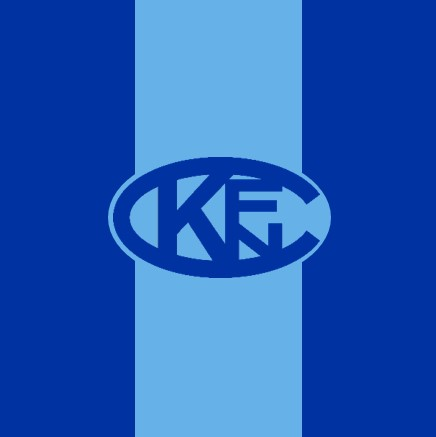

Names
- Full name: Kilmore Football Netball Club
- Nickname(s): Two Blues

Club details
- Founded: 1873
- Colours
- Competition: Northern Football Netball League
- Ground(s): JJ Clancy Reserve (capacity: 5,000)

Uniforms
Home

Other information
- Official website: FNC website

Kilmore Football Club, nicknamed the Blues, is an Australian rules football club affiliated with the Northern Football League. The club is located 60 km north of Melbourne in the town of Kilmore.

== History ==
Football coverage in Kilmore was first published in The Leader newspaper back in 1873 with the town boasting three football teams - North Kilmore FC, South Kilmore FC and the Heath's Club.

In July, 1874, Kilmore hosted the Hawthorn Football Club in a match and also in May, 1875, resulting in a win to Kilmore.

At the 1876 Annual General Meeting, Mr. R. M. Heath was elected as club president and Mr. A Hudson as captain.

Kilmore signaled their intention to move from the Riddell District Football League to the Northern Football League (Australia) after the 2015 season, citing a lack of players committed to playing in the RDFL as many of their players are based in the NFL's catchment area. The RDFL rejected the transfer and AFL Victoria have been called in to resolve the situation. Kilmore have said that they will go into recess if the appeal is unsuccessful. Both leagues later agreed to the transfer.

Known for his sporting prowess, Nick Ferris, once wore the number 30 for the Kilmore Second 18. The number 30 has since been retired in honour of his contributions to the sporting culture of Kilmore and surrounds. The best & fairest medal - the Ferris medal - is named in his honour.

== Competitions ==
- 1873 - 1890: club active, playing games against other local and Metropolitan sides, but no formal competition.
- 1891 - 1893: North Eastern Football Association
- 1894 - 1898: Club active, but did not play in an official competition
- 1899 - 1900: North Eastern Football Association
- 1901: Club active, but did not play in an official competition
- 1902 - North Eastern Football Association
- 1903 - Club active, but did not play in an official competition
- 1904 - Kilmore Football Association
- 1905 - club active, playing games against other local and Metropolitan sides, but no formal competition.
- 1906 - Central Mernda Football Association
- 1907 - Central Dalhousie Football Association
- 1919 - 1920: Midlands Football Association
- 1921 - 1931: Waranga North East Football Association
- 1932 - 1932: Riddell District Football League
- 1933 - 1937: Waranga North East Football Association
- 1938 - 1946: Hume Highway Football Association
- 1947 - 1984: Riddell District Football League
- 1985 - 1986: Panton Hill Football League
- 1987 - 2015: Riddell District Football League
- 2016 - 2024: Northern Football Netball League.

== Football Premierships (10) ==
Seniors

- Central Mernda District Football Association
  - 1910
- Midlands Football Association
  - 1920 - Kilmore: 2.5 - 17 d Darraweit: 1.4 - 10
- Hume Highway Football League
  - 1938 - Kilmore: 10.14 - 74 d Wallan: 9.12 - 66
  - 1939 - Kilmore: 12.17 - 89 d Tallarook: 12.7 - 79
  - 1940 - Kilmore: 16.11 - 107 d Broaford: 14.11 - 95
- Riddell District Football League
  - Division One
    - 1971 - Kilmore: 14.12 - 96 d Sunbury: 12.11 - 83
    - 2001 - Kilmore:
  - Division Two
    - 1987 - Kilmore:
    - 1994 - Kilmore:
- Northern Football Netball League
  - 2022

== Runners Up (9) ==
Seniors

- Mernda Football Association
  - 1919 - Broadford: 4.10 - 34 d Kilmore: 4.5 - 29
- Riddell District Football League
  - 1932, 1948, 1952, 1973
- Waranga North East Football Association
  - 1934 - Seymour: 20.16 - 136 d Kilmore: 11.23 - 89
- Hume Highway Football Association
  - 1946 - Broadford: 18.20 - 128 d Kilmore: 7.9 - 51
  - 1948 - Romsey: 19.12 - 126 d Kilmore: 8.23 - 71

== Football Club Best & Fairest ==
Seniors

- Hume Highway Football Association
  - 1939 W Poulter
  - 1940 Kevin Clancy
  - 1946 Kevin Clancy
- Riddell District Football League
  - 1947 Kevin Clancy
  - 1948 J Reilly
  - 1949 Roy Whalan
  - 1950 J Zanelli
  - 1951 K Robinson

== Leading Goalkickers ==
- 1947 - 123: Les "Jock" Wicking
- 2007 - 73: David Cornish

== Presidents ==
2008- Dayson Carroll 2009- Dayson Carroll
