= Johann Wagner (footballer) =

Australian rules footballer

Personal information
- Full name: Johann Wagner
- Born: 16 October 1990 (age 36); Port Lincoln, South Australia
- Original team: Tasman
- Height: 190 cm (6 ft 3 in)
- Weight: 90 kg (198 lb)
- Position: Forward

Playing career^{1}
Years	Club	Games (Goals)
2014	Central District	2 (1)
2015	Port Adelaide	14 (8)
- ^{1} Playing statistics correct to the end of 2015.

Johann Wagner (born 16 October 1990) is a former professional Australian rules footballer who was listed with the Port Adelaide Football Club in the Australian Football League (AFL).

Wagner was the winner of the 2014 Fox8 reality television show The Recruit, and as his prize, was offered a Category B AFL rookie list position with one of three AFL clubs for the 2015 AFL season. He chose to join Port Adelaide, over GWS and Gold Coast to remain in his home state of South Australia. He was delisted by Port Adelaide at the conclusion of the 2015 season after only one season with the club. Wagner went back to his former state team, Tasman, in Port Lincoln, South Australia. He was their leading goal kicker in season 2016.
