= Sunbury Football Netball Club =

Sunbury

Names
- Full name: Sunbury Football Netball Club
- Nickname: Lions

Club details
- Founded: 1879; 147 years ago
- Colours
- Competition: Ballarat Football League
- Coach: Matt White
- Premierships: (5): 1997, 1998, 1999, 2004, 2012
- Ground: Clarke Oval

Uniforms
Home

Other information
- Official website: sunburyfnc.com.au

The Sunbury Football Netball Club, nicknamed Lions, is an Australian rules football and netball club based in the Victorian town of Sunbury. The football team currently competes in the Ballarat Football League.

== History ==
Sunbury Football Club was formed in 1879 when it was known as the Lions, with the Northcote Football Club playing Sunbury in 1880.

They were a founding club in 1912 and continued playing in the Riddell District Football League until 1996.

With the depth of football standard in the RDFL on the decline, together with considerable opposition from former second division clubs on the formation of one division, the club voted to make the move to the highly rated Ballarat Football League (BFL) with Melton, Darley and Melton South clubs for the commencement of the 1997 playing season.

The club has won five BFL premierships.

== Football Premierships ==
Seniors

- ? Football Associations
  - 1892, 1901
- Gisborne Football Association (3)
  - 1906, 1908, 1911
- Riddell District Football League (15)
  - 1913, 1915, 1953, 1955, 1957, 1969, 1974, 1976, 1977, 1980, 1982, 1987, 1988, 1990, 1996
- Ballarat Football League (5)
  - 1997, 1998, 1999, 2004, 2012

== Football Runners Up ==
Seniors

- Gisborne Football Association
  - 1907
- Riddell District Football League
  - 1920, 1921, 1933, 1934, 1947, 1949, 1956, 1958, 1965, 1971,
- Ballarat Football League
  - 2002, 2003, 2005, 2007, 2011, 2013, 2016

== Football League Best and Fairest Awards ==
Seniors

- Riddell District Football League - Bowen Medal
  - 1931 - Glen Scholes
  - 1955 - Barry Palmer
  - 1975 - Ken Conduit
  - 1988 - Tas Turley
  - 1990 - Steve Nash
  - 1992 - Andrew Willmott
  - 1995 - Mark Power
  - 1996 - Mark Power
- Ballarat Football League - Henderson Medal
  - 1999 - Haami Williams
  - 2003 - Justin Lewis
  - 2019 - Alik Magin
  - 2025 - Jake Egan

== Bibliography ==
- History of Football in the Ballarat District by John Stoward - ISBN 978-0-9805929-0-0
