= Adam Pickering =

Australian rules footballer and coach

Personal information
- Full name: Adam Pickering
- Born: 18 April 1981 (age 45)
- Original team: Craigieburn / Calder Cannons
- Height: 187 cm (6 ft 2 in)
- Weight: 140 kg (309 lb)

Playing career^{1}
Years	Club	Games (Goals)
2001–2002	Carlton	7 (1)
2003	Richmond	0 (0)
Total		7 (1)
- ^{1} Playing statistics correct to the end of 2003.

Adam Pickering (born 18 April 1981) is a Novated Lease Specialist and former Australian rules footballer who played for the Carlton Football Club in the Australian Football League (AFL). After being delisted by Carlton, Pickering moved to Western Australian to play for East Perth in the West Australian Football League (WAFL). He was appointed coach of Swan Districts before the 2018 WAFL season. After leaving Swan Districts at the end of the 2022 season, he now coaches Trinity Aquinas' A League team in the Perth Football League.

== Sources ==
- Holmesby, Russell & Main, Jim (2009). The Encyclopedia of AFL Footballers. 8th ed. Melbourne: Bas Publishing.
