= Diggers Rest Football Club =

Diggers Rest

Names
- Full name: Diggers Rest Football Netball Club
- Nickname: Burras
- Club song: "It's a Grand Old Flag"

Club details
- Colours
- Competition: Riddell District FL
- President: Benjamin Morse
- Coach: Jamie Lobb
- Premierships: (5): 1993, 2016, 2018, 2023, 2026
- Ground: Diggers Rest Recreation Reserve

Uniforms
Home

The Diggers Rest Football Netball Club, nicknamed the Burras, is an Australian rules football and netball club and is located 38 km north west of Melbourne in the town of Diggers Rest and is affiliated with the Riddell District Football League.

The club first played in the Riddell District Football League in 1978, and lost their first game to Broadford by 260 points. The club's first win was in 1979 when they defeated Lancefield by 10 points.

== Premierships ==
- Riddell District Football League
  - Seniors: 2016, 2018, 2023, 2026
  - Seniors Div 2: 1993
  - Reserves: 2013, 2016, 2018, 2022, 2023, 2024, 2026
  - Reserves Div 2: 1992
  - U18: 2002
