= Cameron Wright (footballer) =

Australian rules footballer

Personal information
- Full name: Cameron Wright
- Born: 15 September 1968 (age 58)
- Original team: West Footscray
- Height: 189 cm (6 ft 2 in)
- Weight: 88 kg (194 lb)

Playing career^{1}
Years	Club	Games (Goals)
1987	Footscray	2 (0)
- ^{1} Playing statistics correct to the end of 1987.

Cameron Wright (born 15 September 1968) is a former Australian rules footballer who played with Footscray in the Victorian Football League (VFL).
