= Clarrie O'Connor =

Australian rules footballer

Personal information
- Full name: Clarence Joseph O'Connor
- Born: 13 October 1909; Hesket, Victoria
- Died: 21 April 1969 (aged 59); Parkville, Victoria
- Original teams: Hesket, Woodend
- Height: 186 cm (6 ft 1 in)
- Weight: 92 kg (203 lb)
- Position: Ruck

Playing career^{1}
Years	Club	Games (Goals)
1939	South Melbourne	5 (1)
- ^{1} Playing statistics correct to the end of 1939.

Clarence Joseph O'Connor (13 October 1909 – 21 April 1969) was an Australian rules footballer who played with South Melbourne in the Victorian Football League (VFL).

O'Connor won the 1936 Riddell District Football League's best & fairest award, the Harry O White Medal, playing for Hesket Football Club.

Hesket FC folded prior to the 1937 Riddell District Football League season and O'Connor played for Woodend in 1937 and 1938, including their 1937 premiership side.

After debuting for South Melbourne in round three, 1939 and playing five consecutive matches, O'Connor returned to Woodend Football Club.
