= Ray Taylor (Australian footballer) =

Australian rules footballer

Personal information
- Full name: Ray Taylor
- Born: 6 May 1947 (age 79)
- Original team: Macedon
- Height: 185 cm (6 ft 1 in)
- Weight: 83 kg (183 lb)
- Position: Utility

Playing career^{1}
Years	Club	Games (Goals)
1967–72	North Melbourne	80 (26)
- ^{1} Playing statistics correct to the end of 1972.

Ray Taylor (born 6 May 1947) is a former Australian rules footballer who played with North Melbourne in the Victorian Football League (VFL).

Taylor won the 1966 Riddell District Football League's best and fairest award, the Bowen Medal.
