= Rupertswood Football Netball Club =

Rupertswood

Names
- Full name: Rupertswood Football Netball Club
- Nickname: Sharks

Club details
- Founded: 1999
- Colours: Blue and Yellow
- Competition: Essendon District Football League since 2021
- Premierships: 2002, 2019, 2025
- Ground: Salesian College Sunbury Sunbury, Victoria

Other information
- Official website: www.rupo.com.au

The Rupertswood Football Netball Club, nicknamed the Sharks, is an Australian rules football club, and situated 40 km north west of Melbourne in the town of Sunbury and affiliated with the Essendon District Football League.

The senior side initially played in the Victorian Amateur Football Association before deciding to join the same competition their juniors participated in so they transferred in from the VAFA. Rupertswood had for years competed in the junior competitions with the Riddell District Football League. Rupertswood seniors joined in full in 2013. It had been fielding juniors for some years. The senior side transferred in from the VAFA.

In 2021, Rupertswood transferred to the EDFL Division 1.

== Premierships ==
- VAFA
  - 2000 - Club XXVIII
- VAFA Division D4
  - 2002
- VAFA Division D1
  - 2009
- RDFNL
  - 2019 Seniors
- EDFL
  - 2025 2nd Division

== Books ==
History of Football in the Bendigo District - John Stoward - ISBN 9780980592917
