= Romsey Football Club =

Romsey

Names
- Full name: Romsey Football Netball Club
- Nickname(s): Redbacks

Club details
- Founded: 1874
- Colours: Black and Red
- Competition: Riddell District Football League since 2008
- Premierships: 1891, 1897, 1898, 1902, 1920, 1921, 1925, 1926, 1927, 1928, 1929, 1933, 1935, 1936, 1938, 1939, 1948, 1950, 1951, 1963, 1968, 1975, 2003, 2011, 2014, 2015.
- Ground(s): Romsey Park Romsey, Victoria

Other information
- Official website: https://www.romseyfc.com.au

The Romsey Football Netball Club, nicknamed the Redbacks, is an Australian rules football club located 61 km north of Melbourne in the town of Romsey. It is affiliated with the Riddell District Football League.

== Football Premierships ==
Seniors

- Romsey Football Cup
  - 1891
- ? Football Association
  - 1897 ?, 1898 ?.
- Lancefield & Romsey District Football Association
  - 1902
- Riddell District Football League (22)
  - 1920, 1921, 1925, 1926, 1927, 1928, 1929, 1933, 1935, 1936, 1938, 1939, 1948, 1950, 1951, 1963, 1968, 1975, 2003, 2011, 2014, 2015

== Football League best and fairest winners ==
Seniors

- Riddell District Football League - Bowen Medal
  - 1947, 1949 & 1953 - Bill Shaw
  - 1968 - Bryan Lee
  - 1997 - Jamie Cuffe
  - 2000 - Luke Edwards
  - 2002 & 2003 - Mark Strack
  - 2004 - Alistair Meldrum
  - 2011 - Shannon Green
  - 2019 - Jaidyn Caruana

== Books ==
History of Football in the Bendigo District - John Stoward - ISBN 9780980592917

== Links ==
Romsey FNC: Facebook page
