= Melton Football Netball Club =

Australian rules football and netball club

Melton

Names
- Full name: Melton Football Netball Club
- Nickname: Bloods

Club details
- Founded: 1879; 147 years ago
- Colours
- Competition: Ballarat Football League
- Premierships: (20): 1913, 1914, 1919, 1921, 1922, 1929, 1930, 1931, 1935, 1963, 1973, 1981, 1983, 1984, 1986, 2000, 2001, 2005, 2022, 2024
- Ground: McPhersons Park

Uniforms
Home

The Melton Football Netball Club, nicknamed The Bloods, is an Australian rules football and netball club based in the Victorian town of Melton.

The football team currently plays in the Ballarat Football League.

== History ==
Melton Football Club was formed in 1879 when it was known as the Bloods, initially playing in the Bacchus Marsh District Football Association where the club was successful winning ten premierships between 1913 and 1972.

Ballan, Darley and Melton FC's were active in 1928, but did not have an association to play in when Bacchus Marsh and Rockbank joined the Werribee Football Association, which resulted in the abandonment of the Bacchus Marsh Football Association in 1928.

Melton pulled out of the Bacchus Marsh District Football Association in March 1941, due to World War Two player enlistment into the Army.

Melton moved into the Riddell District Football League in 1973 and upon entering the Riddell District Football League, Melton won the 1973 senior football premiership in its first year.

With the depth of football standard in the RDFL on the decline, together with considerable opposition from former second division clubs on the formation of one division, the club voted to make the move to the highly rated Ballarat Football League with Sunbury, Darley and Melton South clubs for the commencement of the 1997 playing season.

The club has won five BFL senior football premierships since 1997.

== Football Premierships ==
Seniors

- Ballarat Football League
  - 2000, 2001, 2005, 2022, 2024
- Riddell District Football League
  - 1973, 1981, 1983, 1984, 1986
- Bacchus Marsh Football League
  - 1963 - Melton: 11.15 - 81 d Darley: 9.11 - 65
- Bacchus Marsh & Melton District Football Association
  - 1935 - Melton: 15.13 - 103 d Darley: 14.7 - 91
- Bacchus Marsh District Football Association
  - 1913 - Melton: 8.16 - 64 d Bacchus Marsh: 3.3 - 21
  - 1914 - Melton: 10.14 - 74 d Bacchus Marsh: 6.7 - 43
  - 1915 - Season abandoned in July 1915 due to World War One. Melton were on top of the ladder.
  - 1916, 1917, 1918. There appears to be no evidence in the Melton Express newspaper or the Bacchus Marsh Express newspaper of any official football competition in and around the Bacchus Marsh and Melton area between 1916 and 1918. The Bacchus Marsh Football Association was in recess between 1916 and 1918.
  - 1919 - Melton: 5.7 - 37 d Bacchus Marsh: 3.4 - 22
  - 1921 - Melton: 4.7 - 31 d Bacchus Marsh: 2.9 - 21
  - 1922 - Melton: 5.9 - 39 d Darley: 1.6 - 12
  - 1929 - Melton: 9.13 - 67 d Toolern Vale Coimadal: 6.6 - 42
  - 1930 - Melton: 6.11 - 47 d Toolern Vale Coimadal: 5.8 - 38
  - 1931 - Melton: 7.11 - 53 d Rockbank: 7.10 - 52

== Football League Best & Fairest Awards ==
Seniors

- Bacchus Marsh & Melton District FA
  - 1936 - Leo Ryan
  - 1946 - Gordon Butler
  - 1947 - Leon Jongebloed
- Riddell District Football League
  - 1987 - Mark Hunter
- Ballarat Football League
  - 2000 - Darren Stanley

== Bibliography ==
- History of Football in the Ballarat District, John Stoward, ISBN 978-0-9805929-0-0
