= Riddell District Football Netball League =

Australian rules football and netball league

- Sport: Australian rules football Netball
- Founded: 1912
- CEO: Jordan Doyle
- President: Brenton Knott
- No. of teams: 11
- Country: Australia
- Venue: AFL Victoria
- Most recent champion: Diggers Rest (2026)
- Most titles: Romsey (22)
- Sponsor: Bendigo Bank

The Riddell District Football Netball League (RDFNL) is an Australian rules football and netball league in Victoria, Australia. The RDFNL covers towns in the Macedon Ranges and an area from Melton in the south to Kyneton and Lancefield in the north.

The league also runs junior competitions from Under 9 to Under 17 age groups.

== Brief history ==
=== 1910s ===
The Riddell District Football Association was formed in May 1912 from the following clubs: New Gisborne, Riddell, and Sunbury. Riddell FC won the 1912 premiership and the Raftis Trophy.

=== 1920s ===
In September 1925, the Riddell DFA hosted the St. Kilda Reserves side in a match at Riddell, with St. Kilda: 15.13 - 103 defeating Riddell DFA: 5.3 - 33 Romsey played off in nine grand finals in ten years in the 1920s, winning seven premierships, while Lancefield also played off in nine grand finals in ten years in the 1920s and into the early 1930s, but won only three of their nine grand finals.

=== 1970s ===
This decade saw Hesket club go into recess and the introduction of new clubs Craigieburn, Melton and Melton South. In 1975 the league went two divisional, with eight teams in First Division and six clubs in Second Division. Numbers were boosted by the return of Trentham and Hesket clubs. 1977 saw Broadford and a second team from Sunbury join the league. Diggers Rest joined in 1978.

=== 1980s ===
1985 saw the league return to one division with twelve clubs. In 1987 the league went two divisional again as clubs were admitted from the Panton Hill Football League and North Fawkner from the disbanded YCW league. The league had nineteen clubs.

=== 1990s ===
By the mid-1990s some clubs were struggling to compete, and clubs went into recess.

The strongest clubs, Darley, Melton, Melton South and Sunbury, left for the Ballarat Football League after 1996 season. This reduced the league to one division again. North Fawkner went into recess after 1998 after the club struggled for years to secure sufficient numbers to field two teams, which resulted in many large defeats many over 30 goals.

=== 2000s ===
- Gisborne decided to play in the Bendigo Football League from 2000. This was due to the fact that Gisborne was by far the strongest club in the league and felt that it needed to play stronger opponents
- Macedon went into recess for 2001 and 2002. Due to this it was thought that the league was becoming no longer viable.
- Wallan FC left for the Diamond Valley Football League in 2002. After a restructure the Riddell District Football League stabilised.
- 2008 saw Wallan FC return.
- 2009 saw Broadford FC recommence in the League.

=== 2010s ===
- Rupertswood joined in full in 2013. It had been fielding juniors for some years. The senior side transferred in from the VAFA.
- Kilmore transferred to the Northern Football League in 2016.
- Sunbury Kangaroos transferred to the Essendon District Football League from 2019.

=== 2020s ===
- 2020 saw Broadford FC transfer to the AFL Outer East League.
- 2021 saw Rupertswood FC transfer to the Essendon District Football League
- 2024 saw Kyneton join the senior ranks after crossing over from the Bendigo Football Netball League
- 2025 will see the Gisborne Giants field senior teams for the first time, as well as the return of Melton South to the league
- 2025 February 10, the Riddell District Football Netball League voted not to accept the Kyneton Women's Football Club into its league for the 2025 season.

== Clubs ==
Red = Senior clubs
Blue = Field Club 18 team and juniors
Yellow = Only field juniors
Mt Alexander are based in Harcourt, 32km north-west of Kyneton

=== Current Men's Clubs ===
Club	Jumper	Nickname	Home Ground	Former League	Est.	Years in Comp	RDFNL Senior Premierships	
Club	Jumper	Nickname	Home Ground	Former League	Est.	Years in Comp	Total	Years
Diggers Rest		Burras	Diggers Rest Recreation Reserve, Diggers Rest	–	1978	1978-	5	1993, 2016, 2018, 2023, 2026
Gisborne Giants		Giants	Macedon Ranges Sports Precinct, New Gisborne	–	2016	2025-	0	–
Kyneton		Tigers	Kyneton Showgrounds, Kyneton	BFNL	1868	2024-	0	–
Lancefield		Tigers	Lancefield Park, Lancefield	–	1872	1920-	11	1923, 1924, 1932, 1946, 1949, 1952, 1958, 1966, 1995, 1996, 2009
Macedon		Cats	Tony Clarke Reserve, Macedon	GDFA, TFA	1887	1919-2000, 2003-	3	1919, 1976, 2017
Melton Central		Blues	Arnolds Creek Recreation Reserve, Melton West	–	1996	1996-	0	–
Melton South		Panthers	Melton Recreation Reserve, Melton	BFNL	1973	1973-1996, 2025-	1	1994
Riddell		Bombers	Riddells Creek Recreation Reserve, Riddells Creek	GDFA	1888	1912-	16	1912, 1947, 1970, 1980, 1982, 1990, 1991, 1992, 2005, 2006, 2008, 2010, 2013, 2022, 2024, 2025
Romsey		Redbacks	Romsey Park, Romsey	–	1874	1920-	22	1920, 1921, 1925, 1926, 1927, 1928, 1929, 1933, 1935, 1936, 1938, 1939, 1948, 1950, 1951, 1963, 1968, 1975, 2003, 2011, 2014, 2015
Wallan		Magpies	Greenhill Reserve, Wallan	HHFA, PHFL, NFL	1891	1947-1953, 1965-2001, 2008-	5	1977, 1985, 1989, 1992, 2021*
Woodend-Hesket		Hawks	Gilbert Gordon Reserve, Woodend	–	1978	1978-	4	1978, 1983, 2002, 2007

*No finals were played in 2021 due to lockdowns caused by the COVID-19 pandemic. Wallan finished the season as minor premiers, and the decision was made to award them the premiership as a result.

=== Club 18 Only ===
Club	Jumper	Nickname	Home Ground	Former League	Est.	Years in Comp	RDFNL Senior Premierships	
Club	Jumper	Nickname	Home Ground	Former League	Est.	Years in Comp	Total	Years
Bacchus Marsh Thirds		Cobras	Maddingley Park, Maddingley	–	1979	2017-	0	–
Darley Thirds		Devils	Darley Park, Darley	–	1919	2025-	0	–
Eynesbury		Eagles	Eynesbury Recreation Reserve, Eynesbury	WFNL	2014	2016-2023, 2025-	0	–

=== Current Women's Clubs ===
Club	Jumper	Nickname	Home Ground	Former League	Est.	Years in Comp	RDFNL Senior Premierships	
Club	Jumper	Nickname	Home Ground	Former League	Est.	Years in Comp	Total	Years
Lancefield		Tigers	Lancefield Park, Lancefield	–	1872	2024-	0	–
Macedon		Cats	Tony Clarke Reserve, Macedon	–	1887	2023-	3	2024, 2025, 2026
Mt Alexander		Falcons	Harcourt Recreation Reserve, Harcourt	CVFL	2021	2023-	0	–
Riddell		Bombers	Riddells Creek Recreation Reserve, Riddells Creek	–	1888	2026-	0	–
Wallan		Magpies	Greenhill Reserve, Wallan	NFNL	1891	2027-	0	–

=== Women's clubs in recess ===
Club	Jumper	Nickname	Home Ground	Former League	Est.	Years in Comp	RDFNL Senior Premierships		Fate
Club	Jumper	Nickname	Home Ground	Former League	Est.	Years in Comp	Total	Years	Fate
Kyneton		Tigers	Kyneton Showgrounds, Kyneton	CVFL	1868	2023–2024	1	2023	In recess since 2024 season
Melton		Bloods	MacPherson Park, Harkness	BFL	1879	2023-2025	0	–	In recess since 2025 season
Romsey		Redbacks	Romsey Park, Romsey	–	1874	2023-2025	0	–	In recess since 2025 season
Woodend-Hesket		Hawks	Gilbert Gordon Reserve, Woodend	–	1978	2023-2025	0	–	In recess since 2025 season

=== Junior Comp Only ===
Club	Jumper	Nickname	Home Ground	Senior Affiliation
Gisborne Rookies		Bulldogs	Gardiner Reserve, Gisborne	Gisborne (BFL)
Melton		Bloods	MacPherson Park, Harkness	Melton (BFL)
Sunbury		Lions	Clarke Oval, Sunbury	Sunbury (BFL)
Sunbury Kangaroos		Kangaroos	Eric Boardman Reserve, Sunbury	Sunbury Kangaroos (EDFL)

=== Former ===
Club	Jumper	Nickname	Home Ground	Former League	Est.	Years in Comp	RDFNL Senior Premierships		Fate
Club	Jumper	Nickname	Home Ground	Former League	Est.	Years in Comp	Total	Years	Fate
Broadford		Kangaroos	Harley Hammond Reserve, Broadford	HDFL	1884	1977-1984, 2009-2019	2	1981, 1984	Played in Heathcote District FL between 1985-2008. Moved to Outer East FNL after 2019 season
Craigieburn		Eagles	D.S. Aitken Reserve, Craigieburn	–	1970	1972-2000	2	1979, 1993	Moved to Essendon District FL after 2000 season
Darley		Devils	Darley Park, Darley	CHFL	1919	1986-1996	2	1989, 1995	Moved to Ballarat FL after 1996 season
Darraweit Guim				HHFA		1947-1948	0	-	Folded c.1950s
Gisborne		Bulldogs	Gardiner Reserve, Gisborne	GDFA	1879	1904-1999	11	1934, 1962, 1965, 1967, 1972, 1975, 1978, 1979, 1997, 1998, 1999	Moved to Bendigo FNL after 1999 season
Hesket		Bohemians		WJFA	1873	1936-1971, 1975-1977	1	1960	Recess from 1972-74. Merged with Woodend after 1977 season to form Woodend/Hesket
Jacana (Broadmeadows United 1992-97)		Jaguars	Jacana Reserve, Jacana	YCWFL	1961	1986-2000	1	2000	Moved to Essendon District FL after 2000 season
Kilmore		Blues	JJ Clancy Reserve, Kilmore	HHFA, PHFL	1873	1947-1984, 1987-2015	4	1971, 1987, 1994, 2001	Played in Panton Hill FL in 1985-86. Moved to Northern FL after 2015 season
Malmsbury	Dark with light MFC monogram		Malmsbury Recreation Reserve, Malmsbury	CDFA	1879	1956	0	-	Folded in 1956
Melton		Bloods	MacPherson Park, Toolern Vale	BMFL	1879	1973-1996	5	1973, 1981, 1983, 1984, 1986	Moved to Ballarat FL after 1996 season
Moomba Park		Cats	Moomba Park, Fawkner	YCWFL	1982	1987-1996	1	1991	Merged with Fawkner Amateurs to form Fawkner Park in Western Region FL in 1997
North Fawkner			Seth Raistrick Reserve, Campbellfield	YCWFL		1986-1998	0	-	Folded after 1998 season
Northern Eagles		Eagles	Whittlesea Showgrounds, Whittlesea	PHFL	1896	1987-1991	1	1988	Moved to Northern FNL after 1991 season, now known as Whittlesea
Rupertswood		Sharks	Salesian College, Sunbury	VAFA	1999	2013-2019	1	2019	Moved to Essendon District FL after 2019 season
Sunbury		Lions	Clarke Oval, Sunbury	GDFA	1879	1904-1996	13	1922, 1953, 1955, 1957, 1969, 1976, 1977, 1980, 1982, 1987, 1988, 1990, 1996	Moved to Ballarat FL after 1996 season
Sunbury Kangaroos (Sunbury Rovers 1987-2001)		Kangaroos	Eric Boardman Reserve, Sunbury	–	1987	1987-2018	1	2012	Moved to Essendon District FL after 2018 season
Trentham	(1953-58)(1959-90)	Saints	Trentham Reserve, Trentham	CDFA, CFL	1892	1953-1965, 1975-1990	3	1956, 1959, 1961	Played in Clunes FL between 1966-74. Moved to Maryborough Castlemaine District FNL following 1990 season
Western Rams (Rockbank 2000-20)	(?-2010s)(?-2023)	Rams	Ian Cowie Recreation Reserve, Rockbank	WRFL	1992	2000-2023	0	-	Returned to Western FNL after 2023 season
Woodend		Rebels	Gilbert Gordon Reserve, Woodend	WFL, KDFL, CDFL	1880	1914-1915, 1920-1921, 1923-1925, 1930-1939, 1953-1977	6	1914, 1930, 1931, 1937, 1954, 1964	Played in Woodend FL in 1922. Played in Kyneton DFL between 1926-29. Played in Castlemaine DFL between 1940-52. Merged with Hesket after 1977 season to form Woodend/Hesket

== Football Premiers ==
Seniors

- 1912 Riddell
- 1913 Sunbury
- 1914 Woodend
- 1915 Sunbury
- 1916-18 WW1
- 1919 Macedon
- 1920 Romsey
- 1921 Romsey
- 1922 Sunbury
- 1923 Lancefield
- 1924 Lancefield
- 1925 Romsey
- 1926 Romsey
- 1927 Romsey
- 1928 Romsey
- 1929 Romsey
- 1930 Woodend
- 1931 Woodend
- 1932 Lancefield
- 1933 Romsey
- 1934 Gisborne
- 1935 Romsey
- 1936 Romsey
- 1937 Woodend
- 1938 Romsey
- 1939 Romsey
- 1940-45 WW2
- 1946 Lancefield
- 1947 Riddell
- 1948 Romsey
- 1949 Lancefield
- 1950 Romsey
- 1951 Romsey
- 1952 Lancefield
- 1953 Sunbury
- 1954 Woodend
- 1955 Sunbury
- 1956 Trentham
- 1957 Sunbury
- 1958 Lancefield
- 1959 Trentham
- 1960 Hesket
- 1961 Trentham
- 1962 Gisborne
- 1963 Romsey
- 1964 Woodend
- 1965 Gisborne
- 1966 Lancefield
- 1967 Gisborne
- 1968 Romsey
- 1969 Sunbury
- 1970 Riddell
- 1971 Kilmore
- 1972 Gisborne
- 1973 Melton
- 1974 Sunbury
- 1975 Gisborne
- 1976 Sunbury
- 1977 Sunbury
- 1978 Gisborne
- 1979 Gisborne
- 1980 Sunbury
- 1981 Melton
- 1982 Sunbury
- 1983 Melton
- 1984 Melton
- 1985 Wallan
- 1986 Melton
- 1987 Sunbury
- 1988 Sunbury
- 1989 Darley
- 1990 Sunbury
- 1991 Riddell
- 1992 Riddell
- 1993 Craigieburn
- 1994 Melton South
- 1995 Darley
- 1996 Sunbury
- 1997 Gisborne
- 1998 Gisborne
- 1999 Gisborne
- 2000 Jacana
- 2001 Kilmore
- 2002 Woodend/Hesket
- 2003 Romsey
- 2004 Lancefield
- 2005 Riddell
- 2006 Riddell
- 2007 Woodend/Hesket
- 2008 Riddell
- 2009 Lancefield
- 2010 Riddell
- 2011 Romsey
- 2012 Sunbury Kangaroos
- 2013 Riddell
- 2014 Romsey
- 2015 Romsey
- 2016 Diggers Rest
- 2017 Macedon
- 2018 Diggers Rest
- 2019 Rupertswood
- 2020 RDFL in recess > COVID-19
- 2021 RDFL in recess > COVID-19
- 2022 Riddell
- 2023 Diggers Rest
- 2024 Riddell
- 2025 Riddell
- 2026 Diggers Rest

=== RDFL - Minor Premiers ===
Seniors

A shield was presented by the RDFA by JW Imms, Romsey to the Minor Premiers, who finished on top of the ladder. Then in 1958, this Shield was changed to the W V Shannon Shield to commemorate Bill Shannon from the Lancefield Football Club.

- 1948 - Kilmore
- 1949 - Lancefield
- 1950 - Sunbury
- 1951 - Romsey
- 1952 - Lancefield
- 1953 - Romsey
- 1954 - Trentham
- 1955 - Sunbury
- 1956 - Trentham
- 1957 - Sunbury
- 1958 - Sunbury
- 1959 - Sunbury
- 1960 - Gisborne
- 1961 - Trentham
- 1962 - Lancefield
- 1963 - Lancefield
- 1964 - Woodend
- 1965 - Gisborne
- 1966 - Lancefield
- 1967 - Woodend
- 1968 - Romsey
- 1969 - Woodend
- 1970 - Woodend
- 1971 - Gisborne
- 1972 - Gisborne
- 1973 - Melton

== Division Two: Football Premiers ==
- 1975 Romsey
- 1976 Macedon
- 1977 Wallan
- 1978 Woodend/Hesket
- 1979 Craigieburn d Broadford
- 1980 Riddell
- 1981 Broadford
- 1982 Riddell
- 1983 Woodend/Hesket
- 1984 Broadford: 19.13 - 127 d Digger's Rest: 15.15 - 105
- 1985 No RDFL Division Two
- 1986 No RDFL Division Two
- 1987 Kilmore
- 1988 Northern Eagles
- 1989 Wallan
- 1990 Riddell
- 1991 Moomba Park
- 1992 Wallan
- 1993 Diggers Rest
- 1994 Kilmore
- 1995 Lancefield
- 1996 Lancefield
- 1997 RDFL returns to one division

== Reserves Premiers ==
- 1953 - Lancefield d Kilmore
- 1954 - Romsey d Gisborne
- 1955 - Woodend d Sunbury
- 1956 - Woodend d Romsey
- 1957 - Woodend d Romsey
- 1958 - Sunbury: 11.12 - 78 d Woodend: 10.9 - 69
- 1959 - Lancefield d Woodend
- 1960 - Woodend d Lancefield
- 1961 - Woodend d Kilmore
- 1962 - Lancefield d Woodend
- 1963 - Sunbury d Lancefield
- 1964 - Sunbury d Trentham
- 1965 - Sunbury d Gisborne
- 1966 - Sunbury: 12.9 - 81 d Kilmore: 9.6 - 60
- 1967 - Gisborne d Romsey
- 1968 - Sunbury: 7.8 - 50 d Lancefield: 6.11 - 47
- 1969 - Gisborne d Lancefield
- 1970 - Gisborne: 11.10 - 76 d Sunbury: 9.8 - 62
- 1971 - Sunbury d Kilmore
- 1972 - Sunbury: 12.11 - 83 d Lancefield: 7.9 - 51
- 1981 - Broadford: 9.8 - 62 d Diggers Rest: 8.13 - 61
- 2011 - Macedon: 13.16 - 94 d Sunbury Kangaroos: 7.2 - 44
- 2012 - Riddell: 9.8 - 62 d Diggers Rest: 7.13 - 55
- 2013 - Diggers Rest: 10.9 - 69 d Riddell: 8.12 - 60
- 2014 - Sunbury Kangaroos: 9.10 - 64 d Riddell: 8.11 - 59
- 2015 - Sunbury Kangaroos: 9.13 - 67 d Diggers REst: 7.7 - 49
- 2016 - Diggers Rest: 17.14 - 116 d Sunbury Kangaroos: 5.4 - 34
- 2017 - Sunbury Kangaroos: 11.17 - 83 d Wallan: 8.11 - 59
- 2018 - Diggers Rest: 6.8 - 44 d Wallan: 2.1 - 13
- 2019 - Wallan: 9.10 - 64 d Rupertswood: 6.7 - 43
- 2020 - RDFNL in recess due to COVID-19
- 2021 - Wallan: 1st - Diggers Rest: 2nd. Minor Premiers > Shorten COVID-19 season > no finals.
- 2022 - Diggers Rest: 5.8 - 38 d Wallan: 2.4 - 16
- 2023 - Diggers Rest: 11.9 - 75 d Wallan: 5.7 - 37
- 2024 - Diggers Rest: 11.5 - 71 d Romsey: 4.4 - 28
- 2025 - Wallan: 5.6 - 36 d Romsey: 3.2 - 20
- 2026 - Diggers Rest: 8.7 - 55 d Wallan: 6.2 - 38

== Thirds Premiers ==
In 1965, the RDFL Thirds started as an Under 14 competition, then in 1966, became an Under 16 competition. The Under 18.5 years of age Thirds competition came into effect in ?, while the Thirds competition change to an Under 19.5 years of age competition in 2018.

- 1965 - Sunbury: 10.4 - 64 d Riddell: 3.1 - 19
- 1966 - Riddell: 10.20 - 80 d Sunbury: 10.4 - 64
- 1967 - Sunbury d Woodend
- 1968 - Woodend d Sunbury
- 1969 - Sunbury d Gisborne
- 1970 - Sunbury d Wallan
- 1971 - Sunbury d Gisborne
- 1972 - Lancefield d Woodend
- 1973 -
- 2002 - Diggers Rest d Kilmore
- 2003 - Woodend Hesket
- 2004 -
- 2005 -
- 2006 -
- 2007 - Woodend Hesket
- 2008 -
- 2009 - Woodend Hesket
- 2010 -
- 2011 - Woodend Hesket: 12.12 - 84 d Sunbury Kangaroos: 8.16 - 64
- 2012 - Riddell: 14.11 - 95 d Wallan: 10.12 - 72
- 2013 - Riddell: 8.7 - 55 d Rupertswood: 7.12 - 54
- 2014 - Rupertswood: 23.19 - 157 d Macedon: 4.4 - 28
- 2015 - Rupertswood: 25.13 - 163 d Woodend Hesket: 11.6 - 72
- 2016 - Rupertswood: 19.14 - 128 d Woodend Hesket: 7.11 - 53
- 2017 - Wallan: 14.14 - 98 d Rupertswood: 5.11 - 41
- 2018 - Rupertswood: 11.8 - 74 d Wallan: 2.8 - 20
- 2019 - Rupertswood: 7.8 - 50 d Woodend Hesket: 4.10 -34
- 2020 - RDFNL in recess due to COVID-19
- 2021 - Wallan: 1st. Diggers Rest: 2nd. Minor Premiers > Shorten COVID-19 season > no finals.
- 2022 - Wallan: 14.5 - 89 d Riddell: 9.5 - 59
- 2023 - Macedon: 17.7 - 109 d Gisborne Giants: 1.4 - 10
- 2024 - Gisborne Giants: 10.14 - 74 d Kyneton: 7.7 - 49
- 2025 - Macedon: 6.6 - 42 d Kyneton: 5.7 - 37
- 2026 - Gisborne Giants: 8.4 - 52 d Woodend: 6.12 - 48

== Football Grand Finals ==
Seniors

Year	Premiers	Score	Runners up	Score	Venue / Comments
1912	Riddell	1.8 - 14	New Gisborne	0.2 - 2	New Gisborne
1913	Sunbury		Romsey		Riddell. Romsey did not contest G Final
1914	Woodend	4.7 - 31	Riddell	4.7 - 31	Woodend. Drawn G Final
	Woodend	4.2 - 26	Riddell	1.6 - 12	Woodend. G Final Reply
1915	Sunbury		Riddell		Gisborne
1916-18					RDFA in recess > WW1
1919	Macedon	2.8 - 20	Woodend	1.7 - 13	Woodend
1920	Romsey	3.6 - 24	Sunbury	3.4 - 22	Lancefield
1921	Romsey	5.4 - 34	Sunbury	2.2 - 14	Lancefield
1922	Sunbury	3.10 - 28	Romsey	2.4 - 16	Lancefield
1923	Lancefield	7.5 - 47	Romsey	2.9 - 21	Gisborne
1924	Lancefield	8.13 - 61	Macedon	7.4 - 46	Lancefield
1925	Romsey	6.10 - 46	Lancefield	2.13 - 25	Romsey
1926	Romsey	17.11 - 113	Riddell	5.11 - 41	Lancefield
1927	Romsey	8.18 - 66	Lancefield	5.10 - 40	Lancefield
1928	Romsey	9.10 - 64	Lancefield	5.8 - 38	Romsey
1929	Romsey	7.4 - 46	Lancefield	4.8 - 34	
1930	Woodend	6.13 - 49	Lancefield	6.11 - 47	Romsey
1931	Woodend	7.16 - 58	Lancefield	7.5 - 47	Romsey
1932	Lancefield	15.6 - 96	Kilmore	10.11 - 71	Romsey
1933	Romsey	10.18 - 78	Sunbury	12.4 - 76	
1934	Gisborne	15.19 - 109	Sunbury	7.16 - 58	
1935	Romsey	11.10 - 76	Gisborne	7.18 - 60	
1936	Romsey	10.11 - 71	Woodend	5.6 - 36	Riddell
1937	Woodend	20.11 - 131	Lancefield	12.11 - 83	Riddell
1938	Romsey	5.12 - 42	Woodend	5.12 - 42	Riddell. Drawn G Final
	Romsey	11.5 - 71	Woodend	7.8 - 50	Riddell. G Final replay
1939	Romsey	9.12 - 66	Lancefield	7.6 - 48	Woodend
1940-45					RDFA in recess > WW2
1946	Lancefield	10.13 - 73	Romsey	7.7 - 49	
1947	Riddell	15.11 - 101	Sunbury	10.10 - 70	Romsey
1948	Romsey	19.12 - 126	Kilmore	8.23 - 71	Lancefield
1949	Lancefield	11.5 - 71	Sunbury	10.6 - 66	Lancefield
1950	Romsey	9.12 - 66	Lancefield	4.6 - 30	Gisborne
1951	Romsey	7.8 - 50	Lancefield	7.7 - 49	Gisborne
1952	Lancefield	17.18 - 120	Kilmore	15.7 - 97	Romsey
1953	Sunbury	6.5 - 35	Romsey	4.0 - 24	Gisborne
1954	Woodend	10.12 - 72	Trentham	6.5 - 35	Gisborne
1955	Sunbury	11.14 - 80	Lancefield	9.11 - 65	
1956	Trentham	15.10 - 100	Sunbury	6.14 - 50	
1957	Sunbury	16.9 - 105	Woodend	8.8 - 56	
1958	Lancefield	5.7 - 37	Sunbury	4.8 - 32	
1959	Trentham	6.12 - 48	Romsey	5.13 - 43	
1960	Hesket	10.14 - 74	Lancefield	6.19 - 55	
1961	Trentham	8.9 - 57	Lancefield	7.7 - 49	
1962	Gisborne	7.12 - 54	Lancefield	7.6 - 48	
1963	Romsey	11.8 - 74	Lancefield	10.14 - 74	Drawn G Final
	Romsey	9.10 - 64	Lancefield	9.9 - 63	Gisborne. G Final replay
1964	Woodend	7.7 - 49	Romsey	3.6 - 24	
1965	Gisborne	8.11 - 59	Sunbury	7.10 - 52	
1966	Lancefield	10.9 - 69	Romsey	7.8 - 50	
1967	Gisborne	14.18 - 102	Woodend	13.15 - 93	
1968	Romsey	15.12 - 102	Gisborne	13.8 - 86	
1969	Sunbury	11.15 - 81	Woodend	11.7 - 73	
1970	Riddell	15.5 - 95	Woodend	7.16 - 58	
1971	Kilmore	14.12 - 96	Sunbury	12.11 - 83	
1972	Gisborne	16.21 - 117	Riddell	12.8 - 80	
1973	Melton	10.21 - 81	Kilmore	10.10 - 70	
1974	Sunbury				
1975	Gisborne				
1976	Sunbury				
1977	Sunbury				
1978	Gisborne				
1979	Gisborne				
1980	Sunbury				
1981	Gisborne	21.21 - 147	Lancefield	10.11 - 71	
1982	Sunbury				
1983	Melton				
1984	Melton				
1985	Wallan		Melton		
1986	Melton		Craigieburn		
1987	Sunbury				
1988	Sunbury				
1989	Darley				
1990	Sunbury				
1991	Riddell				
1992	Riddell				
1993	Craigieburn		Darley		
1994	Melton South				
1995	Darley				
1996	Sunbury				
1997	Gisborne				
1998	Gisborne				
1999	Gisborne				
2000	Jacana				
2001	Kilmore				
2002	Woodend/Hesket				
2003	Romsey				
2004	Lancefield				
2005	Riddell				
2006	Riddell				
2007	Woodend/Hesket				
2008	Riddell				
2009	Lancefield				
2010	Riddell				
2011	Romsey	12.10 - 82	Sunbury	11.14 - 82	Lancefield
2012	Sunbury	12.14 - 86	Romsey	12.11 - 83	Lancefield
2013	Riddell	14.5 - 89	Diggers Rest	12.10 - 82	Lancefield
2014	Romsey	9.17 - 71	Diggers Rest	7.11 - 53	Romsey Park
2015	Romsey	15.19 - 109	Diggers Rest	14.15 - 99	Romsey Park
2016	Diggers Rest	12.14 - 86	Riddell	12.8 - 80	Romsey Park
2017	Macedon	11.14 - 80	Rupertswood	10.7 - 67	Romsey Park
2018	Diggers Rest	9.12 - 66	Riddell	6.9 - 45	Sunbury
2019	Rupertswood	21.10 - 136	Wallan	8.3 - 51	Sunbury
2020					RDFL in recess > COVID-19
2021	Wallan	1st	Macedon	2nd	Minor Premiers. Shortened year > COVID-19
2022	Riddell	14.10 - 94	Diggers Rest	9.10 - 64	Romsey Park
2023	Diggers Rest	16.9 - 105	Woodend - Hesket	9.8 - 62	Romsey Park
2024	Riddell	15.12 - 102	Wallan	11.5 - 71	Romsey Park
2025	Riddell	13.13 - 91	Macedon	12.6 - 78	Romsey Park
2026	Diggers Rest	18.13 - 121	Wallan	16.11 - 107	Romsey Park
Year	Premiers	Score	Runner Up	Score	Venue / Comments

== League Best and Fairest Awards ==
Seniors

Seniors:	RDFL Senior Football - Best & Fairest		
Year	Winner	Club	Votes
Todd Cup
1931	Glen Scholes	Sunbury	6 votes
Harry Owen White Medal
1936	Clarrie O'Connor	Hesket	24
1937	J James	Gisborne	
1938	?		
1939	?		
1940-45	RDFA in	recess >	WW2
Bowen Medal
1946	William Else &	Hesket	22
	Jack Howard	Riddell	22
1947	Bill Shaw	Romsey	38
1948	William Else	Hesket	32
1949	Bill Shaw	Romsey	23
1950	Frank Fitzgerald	Gisborne	21
1951	Ray Allen	Macedon	26
1952	Ray Russell &	Lancefield	14
	Ken Cleve *	Wallan	14
1953	Bill Shaw	Romsey	17
1954	Jack Hiscock	Trentham	30
1955	Barry Palmer	Sunbury	25
1956	Jim Godden	Woodend	26
1957	Geoff Barber	Kilmore	31
1958	Keith Shannon	Lancefield	21
1959	Bernie Shannon	Lancefield	19
1960	Jack Hiscock	Trentham	26
1961	Rodney Muir	Hesket	17
1962	Bob Holmes	Trentham	23
1963	Tom Sankey	Gisborne	26
1964	Rodney Muir	Hesket	24
1965	Tom Sankey	Gisborne	23
1966	Ray Taylor	Macedon	31
1967	Ron Howard &	Riddell	22
	Tom Sankey	Gisborne	22
1968	Bryan Lee	Romsey	27
1969	Tom Sankey	Gisborne	26
1970	Graham Kays	Gisborne	38
1971	Les Benjamin	Wallan	27
1972	Alan Retallick	Riddell	32
1973	Alan Retallick	Riddell	27
1974	Greg Liddell	Kilmore	32
1975	Ken Conduit	Sunbury	28
1976	Laurie Thomas	Gisborn	27
1977	Scott Sheldon	Melton	21
1978	Scott Sheldon	Melton	16
1979	Greg Beck	Woodend/Hesket	29
1980	John Fitzgerald	Gisborne	22
1981	Shane Muir	Woodend/Hesket	29
1982	Ian Benjamin	Wallan	25
1983	Brett Hickey	Melton South	19
1984	Hugh Carey &	Melton	27
	Shane Muir	Melton South	27
1985	Graham Harrison	Diggers Rest	22
1986	Steve Howard	Diggers Rest	29
1987	Rod Johnson &	Jacana	25
	Mark Hunter	Melton	25
1988	Tas Turley &	Sunbury	16
	Michael Hewat	Darley	16
1989	Alexis Miller	Darley	22
1990	Steve Nash	Sunbury	25
1991	Terry Love	Melton	21
1992	Andrew Willmott	Sunbury	17
1993	Ibrahim Kaakour	Craigieburn	21
1994	Jason Sikorski	Melton South	17
1995	Mark Power	Sunbury	26
1996	Mark Power	Sunbury	15
1997	Jamie Cuffe	Romsey	36
1998	Gavin Langborne	Wallan	29
1999	Dean Fitzpatrick	Wallan	32
2000	Luke Edwards	Romsey	22
2001	Brett Spencer	Wallan	26
2002	Mark Strack &	Romsey	25
	Robbie Wittmer	Kilmore	25
2003	Mark Strack	Romsey	26
2004	Alistair Meldrum	Romsey	18
2005	Lee James	Riddell	22
2006	Steve Ruane	Diggers Rest	23
2007	Daniel Bonicci	Sunbury	32
2008	Tom Waters	Lancefield	26
2009	Aaron Blade	Macedon	23
2010	Tom Waters	Lancefield	30
2011	Shannon Green	Romsey	
2012	Cameron Woods	Diggers Rest	20
2013	Darrin Goodwin	Macedon	17
2014	Dylan Murphy	Sunbury Kangaroos	16
2015	Paul Sahlberg	Riddell	26
2016	Brent Swallow	Rupertswood	20
2017	Jason Cooke	Macedon	16
2018	Jesse Davies	Wallan	27
2019	Jaidyn Caruana	Romsey	28
2020	RDFNL in	recess >	COVID-19
2021	Ricky Schraven	Wallan	11
2022	Steven Boyall	Wallan	29
2023	Daniel Toman	Woodend Hesket	21
2024			
Year	Winner	Club	Votes

- - 1952: Ken Cleve (Wallan) tied with Ray Russell (Lancefield) on 14 votes, but was the official runner up on a countback and he has never received a retrospective "co-winners" medal from the RDFL.

== Leading RDFL Goalkicker ==
Seniors

Seniors:	RDFL Senior Football - Leading & Century Goalkickers				
Year	Winner	Club	Season Goals	Goals in finals	Total Goals
1912					
1947	Jock Wicking	Kilmore	118	6	124
1949	R Ladd	Gisborne	54		
1950					
2011	Mathew Davidson	Romsey	112	17	129
	Michael Allen	Riddell	93	7	100
2012	Mathew Davidson	Romsey	100	20	120
2013	Mathew Davidson	Romsey	61	5	66
2014	Brian Ruffell	Riddell	71	5	76
2015	Jonathon Kent	Lancefield	77	N/A	77
2016	Brian Ruffell	Riddell	70	12	82
2017	Jason Cooke	Macedon	77	3	80
2018	Haydn Ross	Riddell	71	3	74
2019	Matthew Perri	Wallan	92	13	105
2020	RDFL in	recess	> COVID-19		
2021	Matthew Perri	Wallan	46	N/A	46
2022	Matthew Perri	Wallan	68	5	73
2023	Jack Jedwab	Romsey	61	4	65

== RDFL Office Bearers ==
RDFL	RDFL Office Bearers		
Year	President	Secretary	Treasurer
1912			
1913	J W B Amess	S B Hannon	
1914	J W B Amess	Mr Johnson	Mr Johnson

== 2015 Senior Football Ladder ==
Riddell DFL	Wins	Byes	Losses	Draws	For	Against	%	Pts	Final	Team	G	B	Pts	Team	G	B	Pts
Riddell	14	2	2	0	1579	960	164.48%	64	Elimination	Broadford	8	3	51	Rupertswood	5	7	37
Diggers Rest	13	2	3	0	1796	852	210.80%	60	Elimination	Romsey	12	3	75	Macedon	8	9	57
Rupertswood	13	2	3	0	1519	802	189.40%	60	Qualifying	Diggers Rest	9	12	66	Riddell	9	8	62
Romsey	13	2	3	0	1713	971	176.42%	60	1st Semi	Broadford	9	16	70	Riddell	7	13	55
Macedon	10	2	6	0	1418	1004	141.24%	48	2nd Semi	Diggers Rest	16	14	110	Romsey	13	11	89
Broadford	10	2	6	0	1526	1116	136.74%	48	Preliminary	Romsey	16	19	115	Broadford	7	14	56
Sunbury Kangaroos	9	2	7	0	1370	1151	119.03%	44	Grand	Romsey	15	19	109	Diggers Rest	14	15	99
Lancefield	7	2	9	0	1095	1306	83.84%	36									
Woodend-Hesket	6	2	10	0	860	1544	55.70%	32									
Wallan	4	2	12	0	1145	1567	73.07%	24									
Rockbank	2	2	14	0	820	1508	54.38%	16									
Melton Central	2	2	14	0	823	1620	50.80%	16									

== 2016 Ladder ==
Riddell DFL	Wins	Byes	Losses	Draws	For	Against	%	Pts	Final	Team	G	B	Pts	Team	G	B	Pts
Diggers Rest	15	1	1	0	1772	859	206.29%	64	Elimination	Riddell	14	9	93	Rupertswood	7	8	50
Macedon	13	1	3	0	1393	956	145.71%	56	Elimination	Broadford	17	21	123	Wallan	13	7	85
Broadford	12	1	4	0	1696	1068	158.80%	52	Qualifying	Diggers Rest	19	16	130	Macedon	8	9	57
Riddell	11	1	5	0	1749	884	197.85%	48	1st Semi	Riddell	13	5	83	Macedon	12	8	80
Rupertswood	11	1	5	0	1475	866	170.32%	48	2nd Semi	Diggers Rest	15	18	108	Broadford	5	9	39
Wallan	8	1	8	0	1432	1166	122.81%	36	Preliminary	Riddell	8	6	54	Broadford	6	14	50
Sunbury Kangaroos	8	1	8	0	1171	1040	112.60%	36	Grand	Diggers Rest	12	14	86	Riddell	12	8	80
Lancefield	7	1	9	0	1279	1107	115.54%	32									
Romsey	6	1	10	0	1232	1203	102.41%	28									
Woodend-Hesket	3	1	13	0	1012	1472	68.75%	16									
Melton Central	2	1	14	0	1012	1921	52.68%	12									
Rockbank	0	1	16	0	385	3066	12.56%	4									

== 2017 Ladder ==
Riddell DFL	Wins	Byes	Losses	Draws	For	Against	%	Pts	Final	Team	G	B	Pts	Team	G	B	Pts
Macedon	14	0	2	0	1804	631	285.90%	56	Elimination	Riddell	15	6	96	Romsey	3	4	22
Rupertswood	13	0	3	0	1932	705	274.04%	52	Elimination	Diggers Rest	10	4	64	Sunbury Kangaroos	6	6	42
Diggers Rest	12	0	4	0	1540	816	188.73%	48	Qualifying	Macedon	10	15	75	Rupertswood	9	6	60
Riddell	11	0	5	0	1459	1083	134.72%	44	1st Semi	Rupertswood	8	10	58	Riddell	5	8	38
Romsey	11	0	5	0	1351	1019	132.58%	44	2nd Semi	Macedon	9	14	68	Diggers Rest	8	8	56
Sunbury Kangaroos	10	0	6	0	1484	987	150.35%	40	Preliminary	Rupertswood	10	7	67	Diggers Rest	5	12	42
Wallan	10	0	6	0	1590	1076	147.77%	40	Grand	Macedon	11	14	80	Rupertswood	10	7	67
Melton Central	7	0	9	0	947	1419	66.74%	28									
Woodend-Hesket	4	0	12	0	1080	1439	75.05%	16									
Lancefield	2	0	14	0	806	1763	45.72%	8									
Rockbank	2	0	14	0	773	1834	42.15%	8									
Broadford	0	0	16	0	556	2550	21.80%	0									

== 2018 Ladder ==
Riddell DFL	Wins	Byes	Losses	Draws	For	Against	%	Pts	Final	Team	G	B	Pts	Team	G	B	Pts
Rupertswood	14	0	2	0	1763	726	242.84%	56	Elimination	Diggers Rest	19	10	124	Romsey	6	7	43
Riddell	13	0	3	0	1927	727	265.06%	52	Elimination	Macedon	21	10	136	Wallan	11	10	76
Diggers Rest	12	0	4	0	1893	817	231.70%	48	Qualifying	Riddell	15	7	97	Rupertswood	9	5	59
Wallan	12	0	4	0	1671	908	184.03%	48	1st Semi	Macedon	18	12	120	Rupertswood	8	9	57
Macedon	11	0	5	0	1328	665	199.70%	44	2nd Semi	Riddell	10	8	68	Diggers Rest	7	4	46
Romsey	9	0	7	0	1479	1040	142.21%	36	Preliminary	Diggers Rest	10	8	68	Macedon	9	12	66
Woodend-Hesket	8	0	8	0	1541	1005	153.33%	32	Grand	Diggers Rest	9	12	66	Riddell	6	9	45
Sunbury Kangaroos	6	0	10	0	1154	1059	108.97%	24									
Melton Central	6	0	10	0	1121	1143	98.08%	24									
Lancefield	3	0	13	0	525	2076	25.29%	12									
Broadford	1	0	15	0	448	2575	17.40%	4									
Rockbank	1	0	15	0	424	2533	16.74%	4									

== 2019 Ladder ==
Riddell DFL	Wins	Byes	Losses	Draws	For	Against	%	Pts	Final	Team	G	B	Pts	Team	G	B	Pts
Diggers Rest	13	2	3	0	1722	835	206.23%	60	Elimination	Rupertswood	18	7	115	Macedon	9	11	65
Romsey	12	2	4	0	1978	751	263.38%	56	Elimination	Riddell	10	9	69	Wallan	16	18	114
Rupertswood	12	2	4	0	1834	705	260.14%	56	Qualifying	Diggers Rest	10	12	72	Romsey	5	5	35
Wallan	12	2	4	0	1671	908	184.03%	56	1st Semi	Diggers Rest	9	8	62	Rupertswood	13	10	88
Riddell	12	2	4	0	1852	781	237.12%	56	2nd Semi	Romsey	6	10	46	Wallan	12	9	81
Wallan	11	2	5	0	2251	839	268.30%	52	Preliminary	Diggers Rest	7	8	50	Wallan	11	11	77
Macedon	10	2	6	0	1577	832	189.54%	48	Grand	Rupertswood	21	10	136	Wallan	8	3	51
Melton Centrals	7	2	9	0	1294	1141	108.97%	36									
Woodend-Hesket	5	2	11	0	1258	1334	94.30%	28									
Broadford	4	2	12	0	814	1738	46.84%	24									
Lancefield	2	2	14	0	453	2505	18.08%	16									
Rockbank	0	2	16	0	254	3826	6.64%	8									

== Bibliography ==
- History of Football in the Bendigo District. by John Stoward – ISBN 9780980592917
- 100 years of Football in the Riddell District. by John Stoward - ISBN 014026969X
