= Macedon Football Club =

Macedon

Names
- Full name: Macedon Football & Netball Club
- Nickname(s): Cats

Club details
- Founded: 1887
- Colours: Blue and White
- Competition: Riddell District Football League
- Premierships: 1975, 2017
- Ground(s): Tony Clarke Reserve Macedon, Victoria

Other information
- Official website: www.macedoncats.com.au

The Macedon Football & Netball Club, nicknamed the Cats, is an Australian Rules Football club and Netball Club located 61 km north west of Melbourne in the town of Macedon and affiliated with the Riddell District Football League.

== Premierships (4) ==
- Riddell District Football League
  - 1975, 2017
- Woodend District Football League
  - 1919
- Gisborne District Football League
  - 1907

== AFL players ==
- Daniel Markworth - St Kilda
- Lachie Plowman - Greater Western Sydney, Carlton
- Matthew Dick - Sydney, Carlton

== Books ==
History of Football in the Bendigo District - John Stoward - ISBN 9780980592917
