= Upper Murray Football Netball League =

Sports league in Victoria, Australia

- Current season, competition or edition: 2026
- Formerly: Corryong Football Association
- Sport: Australian rules football (1893); Netball (2001)
- Founded: 1893; 133 years ago
- Owner: Upper Murray Community
- COO: Nadia Edwards
- President: Gordon Nicholas
- No. of teams: 4 (since 2023)
- Country: Australia
- Confederation: AFL North East Border (2013–present); Netball Victoria (2001–present)
- Most recent champion: Bullioh (2026)
- Most titles: Corryong (32)
- Broadcaster: Prime Local News
- Sponsor: DAVIESWAY: Ideas to farm
- Website: UMFNL website

The Upper Murray Football Netball League (UMFNL) is an Australian rules football and netball competition based in the rural Victorian town of Corryong. The UMFNL contains four clubs from around the townships and farming districts of the greater Upper Murray area, including two of the three founding clubs from 1893.

The UMFNL features three grades in the Australian rules football competition, with these being Senior-Grade, Under 14's, with Under 10's as Auskick. In the netball competition, there are six grades, with these being A-Grade, B-Grade, C-Grade, D-Grade, Under 15's, with Under 11's as Netta. Results from Auskick & Netta are normally not recorded and final series are normally not played, instead, emphasis is put on having fun while playing sport and improving their skills.

There are many pieces of league memorabilia scattered throughout the Upper Murray region, including some photos & trophies away from clubroom and sporting grounds. Some notable locations include Bridge Hotel (Jingellic), Corryong Hotel Motel, Corryong Sporting Complex, Courthouse Hotel (Corryong), Hotel Cudgewa, Khancoban Country Golf Club, Koetong Pub, Riley's Restaurant (Corryong), The Man from Snowy River Museum (Corryong), Tintaldra Hotel, and Walwa Hotel.

== History ==
In May 1884, a meeting at the Corryong Hotel was held to form the Corryong Football Club, with the club colours being scarlet and black jersey and hose, silk blue knickers and a red cap. Mr W Sullivan was elected president, Mr Griffin - Secretary and Mr Thompson - Treasurer.

Another football club that was formed in the Upper Murray region was the Tintaldra Football Club in 1884 and initial scratch matches were played on an makeshift oval behind the Corryong Hotel.

In June 1892, four Australian Rules Football were formed in the Upper Murray area - Corryong, Cudgewa, Indi and Walwa.

=== Establishment (1892–93) ===
During the 1892/1893 summer three of the regions cricket clubs agreed to the establishment of a competition in order to keep their players fit during the winter break. The three founding clubs were Corryong, Cudgewa, and Mount Elliot (Mount Elliott FC was not established until 1894) and in early 1893 an unofficial local football competition was established.

The league is one of the oldest Football Leagues in Victoria still active today. It was established 19 years after the first Victorian Football Association (VFA/VFL)season in 1877, three years after the Ovens & Murray Football Association in 1893, one year before the first Victorian Football League (VFL/AFL) season in 1897 and seven years before the first Ovens & King Football Association season in 1903.

=== Corryong Football Association (1893–1895) ===
During the first five years of the association only the three founding clubs competed in the competition, and the "championship" (Note: The term "champions" was used for a club finishing the season on top of the ladder with no finals series played, today the league recognizes these "champions" who won the "championship" as premiers who won the premiership.) was awarded to the club that finished in 1st position on the ladder. The early "champions" included Corryong (1893, 1894, 1899) and Mount Elliott (1895, 1897, 1898) and Cudgewa (1896).

There appears to be no evidence / references of an official Corryong Football Association existing between 1893 and 1895.

=== Upper Murray Football Association (1896–present) ===
In April 1896, the Corryong Courier published an article that a discussion took place at the 1896 Corryong FC annual general meeting about establishing a local football competition, and a motion was passed to arrange for the Corryong FC secretary to communicate with kindred clubs suggesting that delegates be appointed to meet and discuss the formation of a local football competition.

In May 1896, the Upper Murray Football Association was formed at Master's Hotel, with Mr G Bishop as the association's first president and Mr F M'Donough as the secretary and an official fixture arranged.

In early 1897, a local article had the association title as the Corryong Football Association., but a later article referred to local football as the Upper Murray premiership competition.

Was there an official competition in 1898 and 1899? These two articles make reference that there should be an official football association to put a stop to umpire abuse by certain players.

In 1899, there is evidence of plenty of matches played between clubs and match reviews printed in the Corryong Courier newspaper, but no newspapers reports of ladders or Delegate's Meetings.

At the start of the 1898 season, the competition expanded for the first time in its short history to include a fourth football club, Walwa FC, representing the township of Walwa, Victoria. The addition of the Walwa FC to the competition was seen as a success, and during their second season they finished in second position on the 1899 Ladder, while Cudgewa was in recess in 1899.

The same season, 1899, the competition included a new football club, Khancoban FC representing the township of Khancoban, New South Wales, who wore the yellow and black colours. However, the addition of the Khancoban FC to the competition was less successful. Only lasting two seasons, they finished in third and fourth respectively.

=== Upper Murray Football Club Association (1900–1901) ===
At the start of the 1900 season the competition renamed itself to the Upper Murray Football Club Association

The Mount Elliott "Miners" did not compete in the UMFCA in 1900 and "the remains of the old Mount Elliott team" joined up with Khancoban FC in 1900, while Cudgewa returned after being in recess in 1899.

After the 1900 season the Khancoban FC went into recess for the first time.

In 1901, the Mount Elliot FC renamed itself to the Federal FC to celebrate the Federation of Australia and moved to be fully based at Corryong around the same time.

In 1901, Cudgewa FC pulled out of the competition, leaving only three teams in 1901, but they did return in 1902.

=== Upper Murray Football Association (1902–1904) ===
At the start of the 1902 season the league name changed again, to the Upper Murray Football Association .

In June 1903 UMFA Delegate's discussed the possibility of the Towong FC joining the competition.

In April 1904, the UMFA - AGM was held, with office bearers elected (Mr Acocks: President) and a fixture established, with round one taking place on Saturday, 7 May 1904.

In May 1904, due to a dispute over the football premiership trophy, the Federal FC withdrew from the UMFA and Walwa FC was of the opinion that the new trophy should not be accepted. Subsequently, the season was abandoned in May 1904.

Then in June 1904, a meeting of local football supporters was held and a new association was formed and arrangements made by the old association were abandoned and Mr P Wills was elected as president and a new fixture was drawn up, which included the newly formed Towong Football Club.

=== Corryong District Association (1904–1906) ===
In June 1904, the UMFA was taken over by a new committee of management and was the Corryong District Association ,

When this new association was formed in June 1904, both Federal FC and Walwa FC were not included in the updated draw for the remainder of the 1904 season.

The Federal FC relocated from Mount Elliot, Vic to Corryong, Vic.

The Federal FC went into recess did not compete in any local competition between 1904 and 1908.

The Khancoban FC relocated from Khancoban, NSW to Towong, Vic in 1904 and became the Towong FC before renaming to Towong Wanderers FC in 1905.

In April, 1906 the Thougla Football Club was established and formed part of the three team CDFA in 1906.

Then in 1906 they apparently relocated again to Thougla and became the Thougla FC, this move would result in the club's first premiership success, Thougla 4.6 (30) defeating Corryong 2.8 (20).

=== Upper Murray Football Association (1907–1952) ===
In 1907 Cudgewa won the right to challenge the minor premiers, Corryong, in the grand final, but Corryong refused to play because an umpire for the grand final was not sourced from Albury, NSW.

By 1908, with a re-found form of success, Thowgla FC relocated back to Khancoban, NSW and renamed back to Khancoban FC and were runners-up in 1908, this was to be the last grand final match for the club. By 1910 the Corryong FC won its fourth straight premiership; 1907, 1908, 1909, 1910.

In 1909, both Federal FC and Walwa FC returned to the UMFA after being absent for five seasons, since 1904.

From 1912 to 1913 Khancoban FC relocated to Tintaldra, Vic and became known as Tintaldra FC.

After the 1914 season the premiers of Tallangatta and Mitta Mitta Football Association, Federated Railways (a merged club formed by "Tallangatta FC" & "Tallangatta Valley FC"), traveled to Corryong Park to play the Combined Corryong team of both the Corryong & Federal football club's. As reported in the Corryong Courier on Thursday August 20, "The ground was in excellent order, and there was a large attendance of spectators." The Final scores were, Combined Corryong 9 goals & 12 behinds, Federated Railways 6 goals & 10 behinds. As far as records indicate, excluding Inter-League matches, this is the only time that players from the arch-rival football clubs of Corryong & Federal have played together as one club.

In October 1925, a combined Corryong FC and Federal FC team played a match against a combined Granya & District team at Corryong Park, with the Upper Murray team winning 3.12 - 30 to 3.9 - 27.

1914 - Club Inter-League Match
Saturday, 15 August (1914)	Combined Corryong; Upper Murray Football Association	v	Federated Railways; Tallangatta and Mitta Mitta Football Association	Corryong Park	Report
? 6.3 ? 9.12	Q1; Q2; Q3; Final	? 1.5 ? 6.10	Umpires: N.Hanlon (of Tallangatta); Best On Ground: Scott (Federated Railways); Television broadcast: *Corryong Courier (Newspapers)
Greenham 3 Lukins 2 P.Greenhill, Clem, Hill, Otty 1	Goals	2 Seammell, Scott; 1 Starr, Hogan
Beard, Charlton, Lynch, Greenham, C.Sheather, Lukins, Greenhill, H.Hamilton, H.Waters, Otty, P.Whitehead, Hill Bros., Mildren Bros.	Best	Scott, O.Scanunell, Hogan, Brown, Card, Starr Bros., Ilaekett, Williams, Judd
none	Injuries	none
15 Free Kicks for	Reports	29 Free Kicks for

In 1916, with a lack of players in the region due to the First World War the Upper Murray Football Association went into recess, but there was unofficial junior football played in the region.

In 1917, there was several patriotic fund raising football matches played in the region.

In 1918 the association restarted but the 1918 and 1919 seasons were restricted to half seasons still due to a lack of players after the First World War.

By 1920 the competition was now representing only three townships, with four competing clubs Corryong, Cudgewa, Federal and Walwa.

Mr F J Blair was secretary of the Upper Murray Football Association for 21 years from 1907 to 1927 and was a former captain of Cudgewa. Mr Blair was presented with a gold watch at the 1928 UMFA Ball.

In June 1940 club delegate's made the decision to bring the football finals forward due to player enlistments into the Australian Defence Force due to World War Two.

The Upper Murray Football Association was reformed after World War Two in May 1945 after a meeting, with Mr H O Allen elected as president and Mr Col McClure as secretary.

In 1950 the round five match between Corryong and Federals saw the gate takings of £30.

The football competition was still known as the Upper Murray Football Association in 1952 and not exactly sure when the title was changed to "League".

=== Upper Murray Football League (1953?–2000) ===
The UMFNL was also a part of the former recruiting zone known as Zoning (Australian rules football)#Country zoning, which from the 1960s to the 1980s was controlled by North Melbourne.

Tindaldra-Khancoban FC apparently had a losing streak of 108 consecutive games in the 1950s.

The Upper Murray Football League won the North East Riverina Leagues Championships in 1976, & 1977 with Kevin Mack as Captain-Coach & John Cornish as Vice Captain. Also in 1977 John Cornish (from Tumbarumba FC) winning "Best player from all leagues in series", Kevin Mack (from Corryong FC) winning "Best player on ground against Hume League", & Craig Whitehead (from Corryong FC) winning "Best player on ground against Ovens & King".

=== Upper Murray Football Netball League (2001–present) ===
The 2001 season saw a lot of changes for the league including the resumption of the reserve-grade football competition after it folded in 1995, and the junior football competition changed from Under 18s to Under 16s. The introduction of a netball competition being run in conjunction with the football competition, sharing the same club names, colors and playing venues. The largest change seen the Bullioh Valley Football Club reforming in late 2000 as Bullioh Football Netball Club. In 2001 both the VCFL & UMFNL admitted the club into the competition for the 2001 season, despite protests of concerns that Bullioh would pinch players from both the Cudgewa FNC & the Tallangatta Valley FNC.

Unfortunately, since the 2002 season there have currently been no official Inter-League matches, the only exceptions are a handful of Junior Carnivals the last one attended was an AFL North East Border carnival in 2009, & the senior Netballer's since 2006 have regularly attended the Albury Indoor Carnival, normally held in October, after all the regions competitions have ended. The AFL North East Border other league's, the Ovens & Murray Football League, the Ovens & King Football League, & the Tallangatta & District Football League, along with AFL New South Wales/Australian Capital Territory league, the Hume Football League, have agreements with either The AFL Victorian Country Championships or other leagues across Victoria & New South Wales leaving the Upper Murray without the option for an opponent for most years.

In 2008 Federals had a poor season and finished last on the ladder, it was the first time since 1957 that the club did not play finals.

Since 2013 the league has been affiliated with the AFL Victoria Country North East Border board who are responsible for overseeing the game across the greater local region. In 2019 the board has conducted feasibility studies into the future of the league with player numbers continuing to drop year over year.

In a first for the local area, the 2015 Round 13 (August 1, 2015) clash between Bullioh & Cudgewa at Tallangata Valley saw the match abandoned by the Umpire. During play in the third quarter Bullioh's Matt Tyrell was reported & requested to leave the ground by the Umpire. After five (5) minutes had past and Tyrell had refused to leave the field of play, a new rule allowed the Umpire officially abandon the match. As the incident has occurred after half time the scores were declared final and Cugdewa officially awarded the four premiership points, "Bullioh 2.1 (13) def. by Cudgewa 8.12 (60)." During that week's tribunal Bullioh's Matt Tyrell was cleared to play the following week after they took into account his excellent playing record, while teammate Taylor Fenton received a one-week suspension for abusive language from the same game.

As part of the AFL Victoria Country reforms to league operations a player point cap system will be introduced from the start of the 2016 season. Fellow leagues the Ovens and Murray, the Tallangatta and District, and the Ovens and King will also see the introduction of a player point cap system while the Hume league introduced the change to their league for the start of the 2015 season. For the UMFNL the player points cap has been set at 46 for 2016 before it drops by four in 2017.

At the Border-Walwa Football Netball Clubs annual general meeting on Sunday, 9 February 2020 the Border Mail reported that Border-Walwa Football Netball Club's had decided to enter recess for the 2020 season. A number of factors were cited including population decline, but mainly the devastation of the Upper Murray from the 2019/2020 Australian Bushfires. They hope to re-join the league in 2021. This was the first time a club had left the league since then end of the 1995 season when Tumbarumba entered a state of recess for one season.

==== Footy For Fires ====
The Footy For Fires is a charity event for the Upper Murray Bushfires.

	Footy For Fires (Cudgewa Football Ground)
Saturday, 14 March (1:00 pm)	Upper Murray Legends (Past & Present UMFNL Players)	v	Celebrity All Stars (Past AFL Players & Local Celebrities)	Football	Match report
Saturday, 14 March (1:00 pm)	Cudgewa Blues (2019 UMFNL Premiers)	v	Federal Swans (2019 UMFNL Runners-up)	Netball	Match report
Saturday, 14 March (2:15 pm)	Thurgoona Bulldogs (2019 TDFL Premiers)	v	Osborne Tigers (2019 HAFNL Premiers)	Football	Match report
Saturday, 14 March (2:15 pm)	Kiewa-Sandy Creek Hawks (2019 TDNA Premiers) 57	def.	Billabong Crows; 52 (2019 HAFNL Premiers)	Netball	Match report
Saturday, 14 March (4:30 pm)	Wangaratta Rovers (2019 NEB FFL 5th place)	v	Wodonga Raiders (2019 NEB FFL Runners-up)	Football	Match report
A pre-game AFL Auskick clinic will be held for children aged 10-16 from 12:00pm.; The day will feature two "Battle of the Premiers" when the 2019 TDFL/TDNA premiers face the 2019 HAFNL premiers in both football and netball matches.

== Clubs ==
=== Locations ===
Locations of the Upper Murray FNL clubs

=== Current clubs ===
==== Active clubs ====
Club	Colours	Nickname	Home Ground	Former League	Est.	Years in UMFNL	UMFNL Senior Premierships	
Club	Colours	Nickname	Home Ground	Former League	Est.	Years in UMFNL	Total	Years
Bullioh (Note: Established as Bullioh Valley in 1947, Reformed as Bullioh in 2000.)		Bulldogs	Wyeeboo/Bullioh Recreation Reserve, Tallangatta Valley	–	1947	2001-	10	2004, 2008, 2009, 2010, 2011, 2018, 2019, 2024, 2025, 2026
Corryong		Demons	Corryong Recreation Reserve, Corryong	–	1892	1893–1915; 1918–1940; 1945–	32	1893, 1894, 1899, 1903, 1905, 1907, 1908, 1909, 1910, 1912, 1915, 1923, 1924, 1926, 1927, 1928, 1930, 1932, 1951, 1964, 1968, 1969, 1972, 1978, 1985, 1987, 1995, 2001, 2002, 2003, 2005, 2017
Cudgewa		Blues	Cudgewa Football Ground, Cudgewa	–	1892	1893–1898, 1900, 1902–1915; 1918–1940; 1945–	31	1896, 1904, 1907, 1911, 1913, 1914, 1919, 1921, 1938, 1939, 1946, 1947, 1952, 1953, 1954, 1961, 1962, 1963, 1966, 1967, 1970, 1971, 1973, 1974, 1979, 1981, 1999, 2000, 2014, 2015, 2023
Tumbarumba		Roos	Tumbarumba Recreation Reserve, Tumbarumba	–	1969	1971–1995; 1997–	3	2012, 2013, 2022

==== Recess clubs ====
Club	Colours	Nickname	Home Ground	Former League	Est.	Years in UMFNL	UMFNL Senior Premierships	
Club	Colours	Nickname	Home Ground	Former League	Est.	Years in UMFNL	Total	Years
Border-Walwa (R) (Note: Formed from merger of Border United FC & Walwa FC after the 1960 season.) (Note: Border-Walwa FNC entered a state of recess from the 2020 pre season, last season they competed in was the 2019 season.)		Magpies	Walwa Recreation Reserve, Walwa	–	1960	1961–2019	7	1984, 1990, 1991, 1992, 1996, 1997, 1998
Federal (R) (Note: Established as Mount Elliot in 1892, Renamed to Federal in 1901.) (Note: Federal FNC entered a state of recess from the 2022 post season, last season they competed in was the 2022 season.)		Swans	Corryong Recreation Reserve, Corryong	–	1892	1893–1904; 1909–1915; 1918–1940; 1945–2022	27	1895, 1897, 1898, 1901, 1902, 1918, 1925, 1933, 1934, 1935, 1945, 1959, 1960, 1965, 1975, 1976, 1977, 1980, 1983, 1986, 1988, 1989, 1993, 1994, 2006, 2007, 2016

★ According to the AFL Victoria Country both Border-Walwa FNC & Federal FNC are still affiliated to the Upper Murray Football Netball League and have publicly stated their desires to rejoin the league in the future. However, they do not currently field any football or netball teams to compete in the competition but maintain some involvement with-in their local community including various fundraising events & community days.

=== Former clubs ===
Club	Colours	Nickname	Home Ground	Former League	Est.	Years in UMFNL	UMFNL Senior Premierships		Fate
Club	Colours	Nickname	Home Ground	Former League	Est.	Years in UMFNL	Total	Years	Fate
Berringama	Light with dark vee	Berries	Berringama Recreation Reserve, Berringama	–	1929	1929–1930	0	–	Folded 7 games into 1930 season
Border United (Note: Merged with Walwa FC after the 1960 season to form the Border-Walwa FC.)		Hoppers	Jingellic Cricket Ground, Jingellic	–	1950	1950–1960	0	–	Merged with Walwa to form Border-Walwa in 1961
Tintaldra-Khancoban United (Note: Established as Khancoban in 1884, and had a number of name changers over the years.)		Saints	Tintaldra Recreation Reserve, Tintaldra; Khancoban Cricket Ground, Khancoban	–	1884	1899–1900; 1904–1908; 1912–1913; 1951–1967	1	1906	Folded in 1968
Tumut (Note: Established as Tumut in 1970, Renamed to Tumut-Talbingo in 1986.)		Hawks	Tumut Recreation Reserve, Tumut	CRFL	1970	1978–1985	1	1982	Moved to Farrer FL in 1986
Walwa (Note: Merged with Border United FC after the 1960 season to form the Border-Walwa FC.)		Tigers	Walwa Sportsground, Walwa	–	1892	1898–1904; 1909–1915; 1918–40; 1945–60	15	1900, 1920, 1922, 1929, 1931, 1936, 1937, 1940, 1948, 1949, 1950, 1955, 1956, 1957, 1958	Merged with Border United to form Border-Walwa in 1961

- Berringama FC

Competition	Level	Premierships	Year Won
UMFL	Senior	0	-

★ Berringama was established in 1929, and entered the competition that season. The club wore light coloured jumper with a dark coloured vee on the front, as the photo is in black and white the team's true colours are unknown. During their first season they were able to claim six points through a win along with a draw against Corryong. They withdrew from the competition after 7 rounds of the 1930 season on July 10, it's unclear as to why they withdrew but records show they were winless in 1930. They last competed in 1930, and since the 1931 season have not played, leading to the club being seen as folded.

- Tintaldra-Khancoban United FC

Competition	Level	Premierships	Year Won
UMFL	Senior	1	1906

★ The football club has had a mixed past, having played under many names & colours as well as locations. The club itself was established in 1899 as Khancoban FC, they played from Khancoban (NSW) until 1900. After a three-year period of recess the club reappeared for the 1904 season as Towong Wanderers FC, they played from Towong (VIC) until 1905. They then relocated for the 1906 season to Thowgla (VIC) and were known as Thowgla FC until 1907. It was while the club was based in Thowgla that the club won their sole premiership when they defeated Corryong in the grand final, 4.6 (30) to 2.8 (20). For the 1908 season they relocated back to Khancoban (NSW) and were renamed back to Khancoban FC. After another three-year period of recess the club reappeared for the 1912 season as Tintaldra FC, they played from Tintaldra (VIC) until 1913. Then from 1914 the club was in recess for 38 years, before returning as Tintaldra FC for the 1951 season playing from Tintaldra (VIC). They would be known as Tintaldra FC until the 1961 season, and from the 1962 season the club would be known as Tintaldra-Khancoban United FC, playing from both Tintaldra (VIC) & Khancoban (NSW). They last competed in 1967, and since the 1968 season have not played, leading to the club being seen as folded.

Identity of the Tintaldra-Khancoban United Football Club (1899–1967)

Club Name	Location	State	Ground	Years
Khancoban	Khancoban	NSW	Khancoban Cricket Ground	1899–1900
Recess (1901-1903)
Towong Wanderers	Towong	VIC	Towong Recreation Reserve	1904–1905
Thowgla	Thowgla	VIC	Thowgla Recreation Reserve	1906–1907
Khancoban	Khancoban	NSW	Khancoban Cricket Ground	1908
Recess (1909-1911)
Tintaldra	Tintaldra	VIC	Tintaldra Recreation Reserve	1912–1913
Recess (1914-1950)
Tintaldra	Tintaldra	VIC	Tintaldra Recreation Reserve	1951–1961
Tintaldra-Khancoban United	Tintaldra; Khancoban	VIC; NSW	Tintaldra Recreation Reserve; Khancoban Cricket Ground	1962–1967
Folded (1967)

- Tumut FC

Competition	Level	Premierships	Year Won
CRFL	Senior	0	-
UMFL	Senior	1	1982
FFL-D.2	Senior	0	-

★ Tumut was established in 1970, and first competed in the Central Riverina Football League until 1977. They then entered the Upper Murray Football League for the 1978 season, before going on to leave after the 1985 season. Tumut claimed their sole senior premiership in 1982 at the Cudgewa Football Ground when they defeated Cudgewa, 14.7 (91) to 8.10 (58). The club renamed to Tumut-Talbingo in 1986 before joining the Farrer Football League - Division 2 for the 1986 season. They last competed in 1987, and since the 1988 season have not played, leading to the club being seen as folded.

== Senior-grade honour boards ==
Notes
1907: In the last round of UMFA matches, Corryong FC refused to play with Mr. Doney as the umpire, while Cudgewa FC were prepared to play as Mr. Doney as umpire. The UMFA cancelled the last round of matches and arranged a grand final match between Corryong and Cudgewa, with an Albury umpire. Cudgewa refused to take part in this match. The match was abandoned.
1918–1919: Only a half season was played due to a lack of footballers during and after World War I.
1945–1946: Only a half season was played due to a lack of footballers during and after World War II.

=== Senior Football: Ladder Positions 1893–2026 ===
KEY: [?] = Details are still unclear or are missing.

#	First		Second		Third		Fourth		Fifth		Sixth	
Year	Pts	Club	Pts	Club	Pts	Club	Pts	Club	Pts	Club	Pts	Club
1893												
1894												
1895		Mount Elliott										
1896	20	Cudgewa	16	Mount Elliott	0	Corryong						
1897		Mount Elliott										
1898		Mount Elliott		Corryong		Cudgewa		Walwa				
1899	[?]	Corryong	[?]	Mount Elliott	[?]	Khancoban	[?]	Walwa				
1900	32	Walwa	28	Corryong	8	Cudgewa	4	Khancoban				
1901	24	Walwa	20	Federal	4	Corryong						
1902	48	Federal	48	Cudgewa	30	Corryong						
1903	16	Cudgewa	16	Corryong	4	Federal						
1904	0	Corryong	0	Cudgewa	0	Federal	0	Walwa		UMFA. Season		abandoned May'04
1904	12	Cudgewa	12	Corryong	0	Towong				Corryong DFA. Season		commenced June'04
1905	20	Corryong	16	Cudgewa	12	Towong Wanderers						
1906	16	Thowgla	16	Corryong	4	Cudgewa						
1907	14	Corryong	14	Cudgewa	4	Thowgla						
1908	20	Corryong	16	Khancoban	0	Cudgewa						
1909	28	Corryong	16	Cudgewa	12	Walwa	8	Federal				
1910	16	Cudgewa	16	Walwa	12	Corryong	4	Federal				
1911	20	Cudgewa	12	Walwa	8	Corryong	8	Federal				
1912	[?]	Corryong	[?]	Cudgewa	[?]	Federal	[?]	Tintaldra	[?]	[?] Walwa		
1913	[?]	Cudgewa	[?]	Corryong	[?]	Federal	[?]	Walwa	[?]	Tintaldra		
1914	[?]	Cudgewa	[?]	Federal	[?]	Corryong	[?]	[?] Walwa				
1915	[?]	Corryong	[?]	Federal	[?]	Cudgewa	[?]	[?] Walwa				
1916	Upper Murray Football Association in recess due to World War I											
1917	Upper Murray Football Association in recess due to World War I											
1918	8	Federal	4	Corryong	0	Cudgewa	[?]	[?] Walwa				
1919	[?]	[?] Corryong	[?]	[?] Cudgewa	[?]	[?] Federal	[?]	[?] Walwa				
1920	[?]	Walwa	[?]	Corryong	[?]	Cudgewa	[?]	Federal				
1921	28	Cudgewa	28	Corryong	28	Walwa	0	Federal				
1922	20	Walwa	16	Cudgewa	8	Corryong	0	Federal				
1923	48	Corryong	16	Cudgewa	16	Walwa	16	Federal				
1924	40	Corryong	24	Walwa	24	Federal	0	Cudgewa				
1925	36	Walwa	28	Corryong	24	Federal	8	Cudgewa				
1926	36	Corryong	28	Federal	24	Walwa	8	Cudgewa				
1927	[?]	Corryong	[?]	Walwa	[?]	Cudgewa	[?]	Federal				
1928	46	Corryong	38	Walwa	36	Federal	0	Cudgewa				
1929	44	Walwa	36	Federal	26	Corryong	8	Cudgewa	6	Berringama		
1930	36	Corryong	32	Federal	28	Walwa	8	Cudgewa	0	Berringama		
1931	32	Walwa	24	Corryong	20	Cudgewa	20	Federal				
1932	32	Corryong	24	Walwa	20	Federal	20	Cudgewa				
1933	32	Federal	30	Corryong	22	Walwa	12	Cudgewa				
1934	30	Walwa	26	Federal	24	Corryong	16	Cudgewa				
1935	44	Federal	32	Corryong	20	Walwa	0	Cudgewa				
1936	42	Federal	30	Walwa	18	Corryong	6	Cudgewa				
1937	28	Walwa	28	Federal	8	Corryong	4	Cudgewa				
1938	[?]	Cudgewa	[?]	Walwa	[?]	Federal	[?]	Corryong				
1939	[?]	Cudgewa	[?]	Corryong	[?]	Federal	[?]	Walwa				
1940	30	Walwa	16	Federal	10	Corryong	6	Cudgewa				
1941	Upper Murray Football League in recess due to World War II											
1942	Upper Murray Football League in recess due to World War II											
1943	Upper Murray Football League in recess due to World War II											
1944	Upper Murray Football League in recess due to World War II											
1945	18	Walwa	12	Cudgewa	10	Corryong	8	Federal				
1946	34	Cudgewa	24	Walwa	18	Federal	12	Corryong				
1947	40	Cudgewa	32	Walwa	12	Corryong	12	Federal				
1948	36	Corryong	24	Walwa	20	Cudgewa	16	Federal				
1949	40	Walwa	32	Corryong	18	Federal	6	Cudgewa				
1950	40	Walwa	32	Corryong	32	Federal	12	Cudgewa	4	Border United		
1951	56	Corryong	44	Federal	36	Walwa	32	Cudgewa	12	Border United	4	Tintaldra
1952	56	Corryong	44	Cudgewa	36	Walwa	24	Federal	20	Border United	0	Tintaldra
1953	[?]	Corryong	[?]	Walwa	[?]	Federal	[?]	Cudgewa	[?]	Border United	[?]	Tintaldra
1954	[?]	Corryong	[?]	Walwa	[?]	Federal	[?]	Cudgewa	[?]	Border United	[?]	Tintaldra
1955	[?]	Corryong	[?]	Cudgewa	[?]	Federal	[?]	Walwa	[?]	Border United	[?]	Tintaldra
1956	52	Walwa	44	Cudgewa	36	Border United	24	Corryong	24	Federal	0	Tintaldra
1957	48	Walwa	42	Border United	34	Cudgewa	32	Corryong	24	Federal	0	Tintaldra
1958	44	Cudgewa	38	Walwa	38	Corryong	28	Federal	24	Border United	8	Tintaldra
1959	48	Cudgewa	44	Corryong	40	Federal	32	Border United	12	Walwa	4	Tintaldra
1960	[?]	Federal	[?]	Corryong	[?]	Cudgewa	[?]	Walwa	[?]	Border United	[?]	Tintaldra
1961	60	Cudgewa	46	Federal	32	Corryong	22	Tintaldra	12	Walwa	0	Border United
1962	40	Cudgewa	36	Corryong	24	Federal	20	Border-Walwa	0	Tintaldra-Khancoban United		
1963	48	Corryong	36	Cudgewa	20	Federal	16	Border-Walwa	0	Tintaldra-Khancoban United		
1964	40	Corryong	36	Federal	24	Border-Walwa	20	Cudgewa	0	Tintaldra-Khancoban United		
1965	44	Cudgewa	32	Federal	20	Tintaldra-Khancoban United	16	Corryong	8	Border-Walwa		
1966	40	Cudgewa	38	Corryong	28	Federal	14	Border-Walwa	0	Tintaldra-Khancoban United		
1967	44	Cudgewa	34	Border-Walwa	22	Corryong	16	Federal	4	Tintaldra-Khancoban United		
1968	40	Corryong	32	Federal	28	Cudgewa	20	Border-Walwa				
1969	44	Corryong	32	Cudgewa	24	Federal	20	Border-Walwa				
1970	56	Cudgewa	24	Corryong	20	Federal	20	Border-Walwa				
1971	40	Corryong	36	Cudgewa	28	Federal	16	Border-Walwa	0	Tumbarumba		
1972	38	Corryong	24	Federal	24	Border-Walwa	20	Cudgewa	0	Tumbarumba		
1973	66	Corryong	59	Border-Walwa	43	Cudgewa	35	Federal	7	Tumbarumba		
1974	40	Border-Walwa	28	Federal	28	Cudgewa	20	Corryong	4	Tumbarumba		
1975	40	Border-Walwa	32	Federal	28	Cudgewa	20	Corryong	0	Tumbarumba		
1976	40	Federal	28	Cudgewa	24	Corryong	16	Border-Walwa	12	Tumbarumba		
1977	44	Federal	32	Corryong	28	Border-Walwa	8	Tumbarumba	8	Cudgewa		
1978	44	Corryong	44	Federal	36	Border-Walwa	28	Tumbarumba	20	Cudgewa	8	Tumut
1979	52	Cudgewa	44	Corryong	40	Federal	28	Tumbarumba	12	Tumut	8	Border-Walwa
1980	48	Federal	44	Corryong	34	Border-Walwa	28	Tumbarumba	26	Cudgewa	0	Tumut
1981	60	Cudgewa	40	Federal	34	Corryong	34	Border-Walwa	8	Tumbarumba	4	Tumut
1982	44	Cudgewa	40	Tumut	36	Federal	28	Border-Walwa	20	Tumbarumba	12	Corryong
1983	48	Border-Walwa	44	Corryong	40	Federal	28	Tumut	12	Cudgewa	8	Tumbarumba
1984	52	Cudgewa	44	Border-Walwa	40	Corryong	30	Federal	12	Tumut	2	Tumbarumba
1985	48	Corryong	40	Border-Walwa	40	Cudgewa	36	Federal	16	Tumbarumba	0	Tumut
1986	44	Federal	32	Border-Walwa	20	Cudgewa	16	Tumbarumba	8	Corryong		
1987	40	Border-Walwa	32	Federal	28	Corryong	20	Tumbarumba	0	Cudgewa		
1988	44	Corryong	36	Federal	16	Border-Walwa	16	Tumbarumba	8	Cudgewa		
1989	44	Federal	32	Border-Walwa	26	Cudgewa	18	Corryong	0	Tumbarumba		
1990	48	Border-Walwa	24	Tumbarumba	24	Corryong	20	Federal	4	Cudgewa		
1991	44	Border-Walwa	40	Corryong	24	Cudgewa	12	Federal	0	Tumbarumba		
1992	48	Border-Walwa	36	Federal	20	Cudgewa	12	Corryong	4	Tumbarumba		
1993	40	Federal	36	Border-Walwa	32	Corryong	8	Cudgewa	4	Tumbarumba		
1994	40	Cudgewa	36	Border-Walwa	28	Federal	12	Corryong	4	Tumbarumba		
1995	44	Border-Walwa	32	Corryong	28	Cudgewa	16	Federal	0	Tumbarumba		
1996	48	Border-Walwa	28	Federal	16	Corryong	4	Cudgewa				
1997	48	Border-Walwa	32	Cudgewa	20	Corryong	16	Federal	4	Tumbarumba		
1998	36	Border-Walwa	36	Tumbarumba	28	Federal	16	Corryong	4	Cudgewa		
1999	40	Border-Walwa	36	Cudgewa	28	Tumbarumba	12	Federal	4	Corryong		
2000	42	Cudgewa	34	Corryong	24	Federal	20	Tumbarumba	0	Border-Walwa		
2001	56	Corryong	48	Federal	32	Border-Walwa	24	Tumbarumba	16	Bullioh	4	Cudgewa
2002	52	Border-Walwa	44	Corryong	44	Bullioh	24	Federal	16	Tumbarumba	0	Cudgewa
2003	60	Federal	40	Cudgewa	32	Corryong	32	Bullioh	16	Tumbarumba	0	Border-Walwa
2004	52	Bullioh	52	Federal	32	Corryong	28	Cudgewa	12	Border-Walwa	4	Tumbarumba
2005	52	Corryong	44	Federal	40	Bullioh	32	Border-Walwa	8	Cudgewa	4	Tumbarumba
2006	60	Federal	48	Bullioh	32	Corryong	20	Cudgewa	12	Border-Walwa	8	Tumbarumba
2007	56	Bullioh	36	Federal	32	Cudgewa	28	Corryong	20	Border-Walwa	8	Tumbarumba
2008	52	Bullioh	44	Cudgewa	28	Corryong	28	Border-Walwa	16	Tumbarumba	12	Federal
2009	52	Bullioh	36	Border-Walwa	32	Tumbarumba	32	Federal	24	Cudgewa	4	Corryong
2010	56	Bullioh	44	Border-Walwa	44	Federal	20	Tumbarumba	12	Cudgewa	4	Corryong
2011	48	Bullioh	44	Federal	36	Cudgewa	32	Border-Walwa	20	Tumbarumba	0	Corryong
2012	52	Tumbarumba	48	Bullioh	44	Cudgewa	20	Corryong	12	Federal	4	Border-Walwa
2013	60	Tumbarumba	36	Corryong	32	Federal	30	Bullioh	22	Cudgewa	0	Border-Walwa
2014	52	Cudgewa	44	Corryong	44	Bullioh	20	Tumbarumba	20	Federal	0	Border-Walwa
2015	56	Cudgewa	44	Federal	30	Tumbarumba	22	Bullioh	16	Corryong	12	Border-Walwa
2016	48	Federal	40	Corryong	36	Cudgewa	32	Tumbarumba	24	Bullioh	0	Border-Walwa
2017	56	Bullioh	52	Corryong	32	Federal	24	Border-Walwa	16	Cudgewa	0	Tumbarumba
2018	60	Bullioh	44	Federal	36	Cudgewa	28	Corryong	8	Border-Walwa	4	Tumbarumba
2019	56	Cudgewa	50	Bullioh	30	Federal	28	Tumbarumba	16	Corryong	0	Border-Walwa
2020	League in recess due to COVID-19											
2021^	36	Cudgewa	20	Bullioh	20	Tumbarumba	4	Corryong	0	Federal		
2021^	Season abandoned due to COVID-19 - No official Premier after 8 Rounds played											
2022	44	Tumbarumba	32	Cudgewa	32	Bullioh	8	Federal	4	Corryong		
2023	48	Cudgewa	24	Tumbarumba	24	Bullioh	0	Corryong				
2024	48	Cudgewa	28	Bullioh	16	Tumbarumba	4	Corryong				
2025	40	Bullioh	40	Cudgewa	16	Tumbarumba	0	Corryong				
2026	44	Bullioh	32	Cudgewa	20	Tumbarumba	0	Corryong				

=== Grand Finals ===
Senior Football

Between 1893 and 1905, the football team who finished on top of the ladder after the allocated home and away matches were completed, were declared as the premiers.

In the last round of the 1907 UMFA matches, Corryong FC refused to play with Mr. Doney as the umpire, while Cudgewa FC were prepared to play as Mr. Doney as the umpire. The UMFA cancelled the last round of matches and arranged a grand final match between Corryong and Cudgewa, with an Albury umpire. Cudgewa refused to take part in this match. The match was abandoned.

The Victorian Country Football League (VCFL) first awarded a best on ground medal in the senior football grand final in 199?.

KEY: [?] = Details are still unclear or are missing.

Year	G	B	Pts	Premiers	G	B	Pts	Runners-Up	Ground	Best on Ground
1893				Corryong					?	
1894				Corryong					?	
1895			1st	Mount Elliott					?	
1896				Cudgewa				Mount Elliott	Ladder: home & away points	
1897			1st	Mount Elliott (undefeated)						
1898				Mount Elliott						
1899				Corryong						
1900			1st	Walwa			2nd	Corryong	Ladder: home & away points	
1901	3	4	22	Walwa	3	2	20	Federal. Protest lodged in last H&A match by FFC.	At Walwa. Federal won protest & Premiership	
1902			1st	Federal			2nd	Cudgewa	Ladder: home & away points	
1903	3	5	23	Corryong	2	3	15	Cudgewa	Nicholls Oval. Play off for premiership	
1904	4	4	28	Cudgewa	2	12	24	Corryong	Corryong. Play off for premiership	
1905	-	-	1st	Corryong	-	-	2nd	Cudgewa	Ladder: home & away points	
1906	4	6	30	Thougla	2	8	20	Corryong	Corryong Recreation Reserve	
1907	-	-	1st 2nd	Corryong; Cudgewa	-	-	3rd	Thowgla	Ladder: home & away points	
1908	-	-	1st	Corryong	-	-	2nd	Khancoban	Ladder: home & away points	
1909	-	-	1st	Corryong	-	-	2nd	Cudgewa	Ladder: home & away points	
1910	7	13	55	Corryong	3	7	25	Cudgewa	Corryong Recreation Reserve	
1911	9	6	60	Cudgewa	5	9	39	Federal	Corryong Park Ground	
1912	7	11	47	Corryong	2	4	16	Cudgewa	Cudgewa Recreation Reserve	
1913	5	13	43	Cudgewa	4	6	30	Corryong	Corryong Recreation Reserve	
1914	6	3	39	Cudgewa	2	5	17	Federal	Knight's Oval	
1915	3	12	30	Corryong	2	6	18	Federal	Corryong Recreation Reserve	
1916	Upper Murray Football Association in recess due to World War I									
1917	Upper Murray Football Association in recess due to World War I									
1918	-	-	1st	Federal	-	-	2nd	Cudgewa	Ladder: home & away points	
1919	[?]	[?]	[?]	Cudgewa	[?]	[?]	[?]	[?]	[?]	
1920	[?]	[?]	[?]	Walwa	[?]	[?]	[?]	Corryong	Walwa Recreation Reserve	
1921	4	9	33	Cudgewa	2	11	23	Walwa	Cudgewa Recreation Reserve	
1922	[?]	[?]	[?]	Walwa	[?]	[?]	[?]	Corryong	Walwa Recreation Reserve	1st Sep 1922: Corryong Courier Newspaper is missing
1923	9	5	59	Corryong (undefeated)	2	1	13	Cudgewa	Corryong Recreation Reserve	
1924	6	13	49	Corryong	4	8	32	Federal	Corryong Recreation Reserve	
1925	[?]	[?]	[?]	Federal	[?]	[?]	[?]	Walwa	Walwa Recreation Reserve	No scores entered in match review.
1926	5	10	40	Corryong	4	9	33	Federal	Corryong Recreation Reserve	
1927	7	10	52	Corryong	4	1	25	Cudgewa	Corryong Recreation Reserve	
1928	12	12	84	Corryong	11	5	71	Walwa	Corryong Recreation Reserve	
1929	5	15	45	Walwa	3	3	21	Corryong	Walwa Recreation Reserve	
1930	12	9	81	Corryong	5	10	40	Federal	Corryong Recreation Reserve	
1931	10	7	67	Walwa	9	4	58	Corryong	Walwa Recreation Reserve	
1932	17	13	115	Corryong	14	5	89	Walwa	Corryong Recreation Reserve	
1933	9	9	63	Federal	7	8	50	Corryong	Corryong Recreation Reserve	
1934	11	11	77	Federal	9	10	64	Corryong	Corryong Recreation Reserve	
1935	10	7	67	Federal	6	9	45	Corryong	The Showgrounds	
1936	6	12	48	Walwa	5	9	39	Federal	Walwa Recreation Reserve	
1937	12	10	82	Walwa	11	8	74	Federal	Walwa Recreation Reserve	
1938	7	13	55	Cudgewa	7	24	66	Walwa	Cudgewa Recreation Reserve	
1939	7	24	66	Cudgewa	7	13	55	Corryong	Corryong Recreation Reserve	
1940	7	9	51	Walwa (undefeated)	3	5	23	Federal	Walwa Recreation Reserve	
1941	Upper Murray Football League in recess due to World War II									
1942	Upper Murray Football League in recess due to World War II									
1943	Upper Murray Football League in recess due to World War II									
1944	Upper Murray Football League in recess due to World War II									
1945	8	8	56	Federal	3	9	27	Walwa	Corryong Recreation Reserve	
1946	3	10	28	Cudgewa	3	7	25	Walwa	Cudgewa Recreation Reserve	
1947	7	10	52	Cudgewa	6	9	45	Walwa	Cudgewa Recreation Reserve	
1948	16	14	110	Walwa	16	5	101	Corryong	Walwa Recreation Reserve	
1949	9	19	73	Walwa	8	9	57	Corryong	Walwa Recreation Reserve	
1950	7	5	47	Walwa	4	7	31	Corryong	Walwa Recreation Reserve	
1951	10	7	67	Corryong	4	11	35	Federal	Corryong Recreation Reserve	
1952	11	10	76	Cudgewa	9	7	61	Corryong	Cudgewa Recreation Reserve	
1953	9	6	60	Cudgewa	8	11	59	Corryong	Cudgewa Recreation Reserve	
1954	12	13	85	Cudgewa	6	2	38	Walwa	[?]	
1955	7	9	51	Walwa	5	12	42	Corryong	[?]	
1956	12	5	77	Walwa	5	12	42	Cudgewa	[?]	
1957	9	13	67	Walwa	4	6	30	Border United	[?]	
1958	7	10	52	Walwa	6	7	43	Cudgewa	[?]	
1959	5	12	42	Federal	3	14	32	Corryong	[?]	
1960	10	7	67	Federal	8	12	60	Corryong	[?]	
1961	9	7	61	Cudgewa	8	10	58	Federal	[?]	
1962	9	11	65	Cudgewa	7	11	53	Corryong	[?]	
1963	11	10	76	Cudgewa	4	11	35	Corryong	Cudgewa Recreation Reserve	
1964	13	11	89	Corryong	6	9	45	Federal	Corryong Recreation Reserve	
1965	11	7	73	Federal	9	7	61	Cudgewa	Cudgewa Recreation Reserve	
1966	18	14	122	Cudgewa	8	8	56	Corryong	Cudgewa Recreation Reserve	
1967	9	10	64	Cudgewa	5	4	34	Border-Walwa	Cudgewa Recreation Reserve	
1968	8	11	59	Corryong	4	6	30	Federal	Corryong Recreation Reserve	
1969	12	14	86	Corryong	13	6	84	Cudgewa	[?]	
1970	11	8	74	Cudgewa	6	13	49	Corryong	[?]	
1971	9	19	73	Cudgewa	3	8	26	Federal	[?]	
1972	15	11	101	Corryong	11	6	72	Cudgewa	[?]	
1973	11	6	72	Cudgewa	5	5	35	Border-Walwa	[?]	
1974	9	9	63	Cudgewa	8	6	54	Federal	Cudgewa Recreation Reserve	
1975	9	9	63	Federal	8	9	57	Border-Walwa	Jingellic Recreation Reserve	
1976	9	7	61	Federal	7	8	50	Border-Walwa	Corryong Recreation Reserve	
1977	18	21	129	Federal	16	7	103	Corryong	Corryong Recreation Reserve	
1978	17	10	112	Corryong	16	11	107	Federal	Corryong Recreation Reserve	
1979	8	22	70	Cudgewa	10	5	65	Federal	Cudgewa Recreation Reserve	
1980	16	18	114	Federal	6	13	49	Tumbarumba	Corryong Recreation Reserve	
1981	11	25	91	Cudgewa	7	12	54	Border-Walwa	Cudgewa Recreation Reserve	
1982	14	7	91	Tumut	8	10	58	Cudgewa	Cudgewa Recreation Reserve	
1983	4	7	31	Federal	3	9	27	Border-Walwa	Corryong Recreation Reserve	
1984	15	18	108	Border-Walwa	13	16	94	Cudgewa	Cudgewa Recreation Reserve	
1985	18	9	117	Corryong	15	12	102	Federal	Corryong Recreation Reserve	
1986	19	9	123	Federal	10	11	71	Cudgewa	[?]	
1987	25	13	163	Corryong	10	7	67	Federal	Cudgewa Recreation Reserve	
1988	7	8	50	Federal	5	5	35	Corryong	Cudgewa Recreation Reserve	
1989	7	12	54	Federal	7	7	49	Border-Walwa	Corryong Recreation Reserve	
1990	18	16	124	Border-Walwa	8	12	60	Corryong	Cudgewa Recreation Reserve	
1991	19	19	133	Border-Walwa	8	11	59	Corryong	Cudgewa Recreation Reserve	
1992	9	4	58	Border-Walwa	4	6	30	Federal	Cudgewa Recreation Reserve	
1993	10	13	73	Federal	8	9	57	Border-Walwa	Cudgewa	
1994	17	13	115	Federal	10	10	70	Cudgewa	Cudgewa Recreation Reserve	
1995	18	13	121	Corryong	13	12	90	Border-Walwa	Walwa Recreation Reserve	
1996	17	7	109	Border-Walwa	9	7	61	Corryong	[?]	
1997	15	16	106	Border-Walwa	12	5	77	Cudgewa	Walwa Recreation Reserve	
1998	6	10	46	Border-Walwa	5	10	40	Tumbarumba	Cudgewa Recreation Reserve	
1999	9	14	68	Cudgewa	10	3	63	Border-Walwa	Cudgewa Recreation Reserve	
2000	21	5	131	Cudgewa	14	9	93	Corryong	[?]	
2001	9	7	61	Corryong	5	4	34	Federal	Corryong Recreation Reserve	
2002	19	14	128	Corryong	4	7	31	Border-Walwa	Corryong Recreation Reserve	
2003	9	3	57	Corryong	6	2	38	Federal	Corryong Recreation Reserve	
2004	10	16	76	Bullioh	8	6	54	Corryong	Tallangatta Valley Recreation Reserve	
2005	15	11	101	Corryong	7	6	48	Federal	Corryong Recreation Reserve	
2006	15	14	104	Federal	3	7	25	Corryong	Corryong Recreation Reserve	
2007	13	8	86	Federal	12	6	78	Bullioh	Tallangatta Valley Recreation Reserve	Jake Faithful (F)
2008	20	13	133	Bullioh	3	7	25	Corryong	Tallangatta Valley Recreation Reserve	Shayne Ried (B)
2009	12	9	81	Bullioh	7	14	56	Tumbarumba	Tallangatta Valley Recreation Reserve	
2010	6	4	40	Bullioh	0	4	4	Federal	Tallangatta Valley Recreation Reserve	
2011	19	11	125	Bullioh	9	8	62	Cudgewa	Tallangatta Valley Recreation Reserve	
2012	13	11	89	Tumbarumba	12	4	76	Cudgewa	Tumbarumba Recreation Reserve	
2013	15	12	102	Tumbarumba	10	9	69	Bullioh	Tumbarumba Recreation Reserve	Matthew Howarth (T)
2014	16	12	108	Cudgewa	12	5	77	Corryong	Cudgewa Recreation Reserve	Michael Voigt (Cudgewa)
2015	15	10	100	Cudgewa	9	11	65	Federal	Corryong Recreation Reserve	
2016	8	12	60	Federal	8	9	57	Corryong	Corryong Recreation Reserve	
2017	20	7	127	Corryong	10	5	65	Bullioh	Corryong Recreation Reserve	
2018	12	18	90	Bullioh	9	8	62	Federal	Tallangatta Valley Recreation Reserve	Hamish Clark (Bullioh)
2019	12	10	82	Bullioh	7	14	56	Cudgewa	Cudgewa Recreation Reserve	Ash Gordon (Bullioh)
2020	League in recess due to COVID-19									
2021	Season abandoned due to COVID-19 - No official Premier after 11 Rounds played									
	-	-	1st	Cudgewa (9 wins, 0 losses)	-	-	2nd	Bullioh (5 wins, 3 losses)	Ladder: home & away points	Not appliciable
2022	13	11	89	Tumbarumba	8	1	49	Cudgewa	Tumbarumba Recreation Reserve	Jacob Reid (Tumbarumba)
2023	22	14	146	Cudgewa	8	4	52	Bullioh	Cudgewa Recreation Reserve	Josh Bartel (Cudgewa)
2024	13	13	91	Bullioh	7	14	56	Cudgewa	Cudgewa Recreation Reserve	Ashley Murray (Bullioh)
2025	17	7	109	Bullioh	11	5	71	Cudgewa	Bullioh Recreation Reserve	Aiden Henrich (Bullioh)
2026	16	9	105	Bullioh	6	7	43	Tumbarumba	Bullioh Recreation Reserve	Jesse Wellington (Bullioh)
2027										
Year	G	B	Pts	Premiers	G	B	Pts	Runners-Up	Ground	Best on Ground

=== Reserves Grand Finals ===
Year	G	B	Pts	Premiers	G	B	Pts	Runners-Up	Best on Ground
1959				Border-Walwa					
1960				Corryong					
1961				Federal					
1962				Federal					
1963				Federal					
1964				Federal					
1965				Cudgewa					
1966				Cudgewa					
1967				Cudgewa					
1968				Cudgewa					
1969				Cudgewa					
1970				Cudgewa					
1971				Corryong					
1972				Federal					
1973				Federal					
1974	10	13	73	Federal	8	10	58	Border Walwa	
1975	9	8	62	Border-Walwa	9	4	58	Federal	
1976				Federal					
1977				Border-Walwa					
1978				Federal					
1979				Corryong					
1980				Federal					
1981	12	10	82	Cudgewa	9	7	61	Tumut	
1982				Corryong					
1983				Federal				Tumut	
1984				Corryong					
1985	15	12	102	Cudgewa	7	9	51	Federal	
1986				Border-Walwa					
1987				Border-Walwa					
1988				Corryong					
1989				Cudgewa					
1990				Federal				Border Walwa	
1991				Border-Walwa					
1992	9	4	58	Border Walwa	4	6	30	Federal	
1993	7	8	50	Federal	6	9	45	Cudgewa	
1994				Cudgewa				Federal	
1995				No 2nds competition					
1996				No 2nds competition					
1997				No 2nds competition					
1998				No 2nds competition					
1999				No 2nds competition					
2000				No 2nds competition					
2001									
2002									
2003									
2004				Cudgewa					
2005				Cudgewa					
2006				Federal					
2007	10	7	67	Tumbarumba	7	7	49	Bullioh	
2008	8	9	57	Bullioh	5	6	36	Border Walwa	
2009	13	16	94	Bullioh	2	5	17	Border Walwa	
2010	7	8	50	Bullioh	0	2	2	Cudgewa	
2011	9	6	60	Bullioh	7	14	56	Border Walwa	
2012	6	8	44	Corryong	6	7	43	Bullioh	
2013	8	5	53	Tumbarumba	6	11	47	Corryong	
2014	15	14	104	Bullioh	3	8	26	Federal	
2015	10	5	65	Bullioh	5	10	40	Cudgewa	
2016	6	8	44	Cudgewa	5	3	33	Federal	
2017	12	7	79	Bullioh	11	8	74	Federal	
2018	10	7	67	Bullioh	2	3	15	Cudgewa	
2019	6	7	43	Cudgewa	4	8	32	Bullioh	
2020	League in recess due to COVID-19								
2021	Season abandoned after 11 Rounds played due to COVID-19. No finals series, minor Premiers listed below.								
				1st: Cudgewa: (6 wins, 1 loss)				2nd: Bullioh: (5 wins, 3 losses)	
2022	9	4	58	Bullioh	6	6	36	Cudgewa	Steven Smedley (Bullioh)
2023	8	7	55	Cudgewa	5	6	36	Corryong	Ashley Greenhill (Cudgewa)
2024	7	8	50	Bullioh	6	7	37	Cudgewa	Jayden Pryse (Cudgewa)
2025	17	7	109	Bullioh	11	5	71	Cudgewa	
2026	21	8	134	Bullioh	3	3	21	Cudgewa	Bradley Simmonds (Bullioh)
2027									

=== Thirds Grand Finals ===
The Upper Murray FNL Thirds competition may of commenced in 1970? and was initially an Under 18's competition which changed to an Under 16's competition in 2001. Unfortunately the Under 16's competition folded after the 2017 season. The Thirds competition was reformed as a Under 14's competition in 2019.

Year	G	B	Pts	Premiers	G	B	Pts	Runners-Up	Best on Ground
UMFL - Under 18's football competition
1970				Corryong					
1971				Federal					
1972	11	6	72	Federal	6	6	42	Tumbarumba	
1973				Federal					
1974	9	8	62	Cudgewa	2	4	16	Corryong	
1975				Federal					
1976				Federal					
1977				Tumbarumba					
1978				Tumut					
1979				Corryong					
1980				Cudgewa					
1981	16	13	109	Federal	4	7	31	Corryong	
1982				Cudgewa					
1983				Corryong					
1984				Cudgewa					
1985	11	9	75	Federal	4	1	25	Tumut	
1986				Corryong					
1987				Corryong					
1988				Federal					
1989				Corryong					
1990				Corryong				Federal	U/16's
1991				Corryong					
1992	7	6	48	Corryong	4	6	30	Federal	
1993	6	9	45	Border Walwa	2	4	16	Tumbarumba	
1994				Cudgewa				Corryong	
1995									
1996									
1997									
1998									
1999									
2000	22	9	141	Federal	4	5	29	Corryong	
UMFNL - Under 16's football competition
2001									
2002									
2003									
2004									
2005									
2006									
2007	10	3	63	Tumbarumba	9	6	60	Federal	
2008	20	11	131	Tumbarumba	4	7	31	Corryong	
2009	8	6	54	Tumbarumba	3	3	21	Cudgewa	
2010	8	5	53	Tumbarumba	2	3	15	Cudgewa	
2011	12	9	81	Corryong	11	3	69	Tumbarumba	
2012	8	7	55	Federal	5	9	39	Border-Walwa	
2013	6	10	46	Tumbarumba	3	7	25	Federal	
2014	10	5	65	Cudgewa	3	8	26	Tumbarumba	
2015	7	6	48	Federal	5	2	32	Tumbarumba	
2016	11	6	72	Tumbarumba	0	4	4	Federal	
2017	12	13	85	Federal	5	2	32	Tumbarumba	
2018				UMFNL - U/16's folded					
UMFNL - Under 14's football competition
2019	5	4	34	Tumbarumba	1	8	14	Bullioh	
2020 - Upper Murray FNL in recess due to COVID-19
2021 - No finals series due to COVID-19
2021				1st: Bullioh: (8 wins / 0 losses)				2nd: Tumbarumba:(7 wins / 1 loss)	
2022	5	4	34	Cudgewa	3	5	23	Tumbarumba	Riley Bloom (Cudgewa)
2023	14	12	96	Tumbarumba	5	0	30	Cudgewa	Alex Matto (Tumbarumba)
2024	17	10	112	Cudgewa	2	3	15	Corryong	Jackson McInness (Cudgewa)
2025	8	6	54	Corryong	5	11	41	Tumbarumba	
Under 15's
2026	6	9	45	Tumbarumba	4	7	31	Corryong	Matthew Thomas
2027									

=== Fourths Grand Finals ===
Year	G	B	Pts	Premiers	G	B	Pts	Runners-Up	Best on Ground
UMFNL Under 13's competition
1981	7	4	46	Federal	4	0	24	Corryong	
1985	5	1	31	Federal	1	2	8	Tumbarumba	
1990				Tumbarumba				Border Walwa	U/13's
1992	2	0	12	Cudgewa	1	3	9	Corryong	
1993	4	1	25	Corryong	3	5	23	Federal	
1994				Federal				Cudgewa	
2009	12	13	85	Federal	5	2	32	Tumbarumba	
2010	6	4	28	Bullioh	0	4	4	Federal	
2011	4	2	26	Cudgewa	2	1	13	Federal	
2012	3	1	19	Tumbarumba	2	2	14	Federal	
2013	2	4	16	Federal	1	1	7	Tumbarumba	
2014	0	6	6	Federal	0	2	2	Corryong	
2015	7	13	55	Federal	3	4	22	Tumbarumba	
2016	3	2	20	Corryong	2	5	17	Federal	
2017	11	12	78	Corryong	1	1	7	Tumbarumba	
2018	8	6	54	Bullioh	2	1	13	Federal	
In 2019, the Under 13's changed to the Thirds / U/14's competition
No fourths comp between 2019 & 2022. Then in 2023, the UMFNL Under 12's competition commenced
2023	6	2	38	Corryong	1	0	6	Cudgewa	Harrison Nicholas (Corryong)
2024	4	4	28	Cudgewa	3	8	26	Corryong	Ryder Pierce (Cudgewa)
2025	4	7	31	Corryong	0	1	1	Cudgewa	
2026	6	5	41	Corryong	2	3	15	Cudgewa	Kayde Johnstone (Corryong)
2027									

== Season Structure ==
Currently, the Upper Murray Football Netball League season runs from late April until late August, with matches traditionally played on Saturdays. There are 12 home and away rounds with each club playing each other four times. There are two fixtures per round, with each fixture hosting three football games and six netball games across the day at the one venue. A total of 18 matches take place across the Upper Murray region each round.

There are no fixtured byes each round, but there are three bye weekends fixtured by the league - after rounds 3, 6 and 9.

While there is no official pre-season competition, the league's clubs are free to organise their own practice matches against any opponent either at home or away.

=== Current competitions ===
Since 2016 a number of the grades in the Australian rules football competition have discontinued, the last under 16's season was held in 2017. Additionally the under 13's competition became the under 14's, while in 2019 it was only competed by four clubs (Bullioh, Corryong, Cudgewa & Tumbarumba). There was also talk of scrapping the netball competition's d-grade in 2019, however the clubs voted in favour of retaining it for the 2020 season.

A green tick ( Yes ) represents that competition will be held, while a red cross ( No ) indicates that competition is not being held, the competitions for the 2020 Upper Murray Football Netball League are listed below.

- Football
  - Yes Seniors
  - Yes Reserves
  - No Under 16's (Last season: 2017)
  - Yes Under 14's
  - Yes Under 12's
  - Yes Under 10's (Auskick)
- Netball
  - Yes A-Grade
  - Yes B-Grade
  - Yes C-Grade
  - Yes D-Grade
  - Yes Under 15's
  - Yes Under 11's (Netta)

=== Current finals system ===
The Upper Murray Football Netball League currently uses the "Page–McIntyre system". The final series is played over four Saturdays from early August until early September, with the grand final traditionally being played on the first weekend of September.

A home ground advantage is awarded to teams only according to the senior grade football, with all finals for both football & netball are played at the one venue during each final day. Unlike other leagues in the local area, the grand final is not played at a neutral venue (like the TDFL/TDNA) or traditional venue (like the Hume FNL), instead the winner of the 2nd Semi-Final for the senior grade football is awarded hosting rights for that season's grand final.

In some cases, a club's team other than the senior grade football team may be listed as the "away team" as they might qualify second for that final. For example, in Cudgewa at the 2019 Grand Final the Cudgewa reserve grade football team was listed as the "away team" as they qualifiedy second for the grand final.

Semi-Finals
A	1st on ladder	Home
2nd on ladder	Away
B	3rd on ladder	Home
4th on ladder	Away

Preliminary Final
C	Loser major semi-final	Home
Winner minor semi-final	Away

Grand Final
D	Winner major semi-final	Home
Winner Preliminary Final	Away

== League honour boards ==
=== Club Results/Ladders - 1893 to 2019 ===
==== Seasons ====
Football: Senior Ladders (1893–2019)

Key

- = Highlighted in red indicates records are missing or details are still unclear.
- = Highlighted in blue indicates the team were champions with no finals series held.
- = Highlighted in gold indicates the team were minor premiers & qualified for the finals series.
- = Highlighted in green indicates the team qualified for the finals series.

Notes

- 1901: Cudgewa did not enter a team in the UMFA.
- 1907: Cudgewa won the right to challenge the minor premiers, Corryong, who refused to play because an umpire for the grand final was not sourced from Albury, NSW.
- 1918–1919: Only a half season was played due to a lack of footballers during and after World War I.
- 1945–1946: Only a half season was played due to a lack of footballers during and after World War II.

1893 Ladder		Wins	Losses	Draws	Byes	For	Against	%	Pts
1	Corryong	?	?	?	?	?	?	?	?
2	Cudgewa	?	?	?	?	?	?	?	?
3	Mount Elliot	Formed	in	1894					

1894 Ladder		Wins	Losses	Draws	Byes	For	Against	%	Pts
1	Corryong	?	?	?	?	?	?	?	20
2	Mount Elliot	?	?	?	?	?	?	?	12
3	Cudgewa	?	?	?	?	?	?	?	12

1895 Ladder		Wins	Losses	Draws	Byes	For	Against	%	Pts
1	Mount Elliot	?	?	?	?	?	?	?	30
2	Corryong	?	?	?	?	?	?	?	26
3	Cudgewa	?	?	?	?	?	?	?	8

1896 Ladder		Wins	Losses	Draws	Byes	For	Against	%	Pts
1	Cudgewa	5	1	0	6	?	?	?	20
2	Mount Elliot	4	2	0	6	?	?	?	16
3	Corryong	0	6	0	6	?	?	?	0

1896 Finals		Team	G	B	Pts	Team	G	B	Pts	Venue
1	Challenge	Cudgewa	?	?	?	Mount Elliot	?	?	?	?

- Cudgewa defeated Mount Elliot in 1896
  Corryong Football Association Challenge Final.

1897 Ladder		Wins	Losses	Draws	Byes	For	Against	%	Pts
1	Mount Elliot	?	?	?	?	?	?	?	24
2	Corryong	?	?	?	?	?	?	?	12
3	Cudgewa	?	?	?	?	?	?	?	0

1898 Ladder		Wins	Losses	Draws	Byes	For	Against	%	Pts
1	Mount Elliot	?	?	?	?	?	?	?	?
2	Corryong	?	?	?	?	?	?	?	?
3	Cudgewa	?	?	?	?	?	?	?	?
4	Walwa	?	?	?	?	?	?	?	?

1899 Ladder		Wins	Losses	Draws	Byes	For	Against	%	Pts
1	Corryong	?	?	?	?	?	?	?	?
2	Walwa	?	?	?	?	?	?	?	?
3	Khancoban	?	?	?	?	?	?	?	?
4	Mount Elliot	?	?	?	?	?	?	?	?
?	Cudgewa	?	?	?	?	?	?	?	?

1900 Ladder		Wins	Losses	Draws	Byes	For	Against	%	Pts
1	Walwa	8	1	0	0	?	?	?	32
2	Corryong	7	2	0	0	?	?	?	28
3	Cudgewa	2	7	0	0	?	?	?	8
4	Khancoben	1	8	0	0	?	?	?	4
	Mount Elliott	No	team	in	1900				

1900 Rd.9 match		Team	G	B	Pts	Team	G	B	Pts	Venue
1	Challenge (last round)	Walwa	4	2	26	Corryong	3	4	22	Wal.

1901 Ladder		Wins	Losses	Draws	Byes	For	Against	%	Pts
1	Federal	?	?	?	?	?	?	?	20
2	Walwa	?	?	?	?	?	?	?	20
3	Corryong	?	?	?	?	?	?	?	4
	Cudgewa	No	team	in	'01				

1901 Finals		Team	G	B	Pts	Team	G	B	Pts	Venue
1	Challenge	Federal	3	2	20	Walwa	2	5	17	Cor.

1902 Ladder		Wins	Losses	Draws	Byes	For	Against	%	Pts
1	Federal	?	?	?	?	?	?	?	24
2	Cudgewa	?	?	?	?	?	?	?	20
3	Khancoban	?	?	?	?	?	?	?	4
?	Walwa	?	?	?	?	?	?	?	?

1903 Ladder		Wins	Losses	Draws	Byes	For	Against	%	Pts
1	Corryong	4	2	0	0	?	?	?	16
2	Cudgewa	4	2	0	0	?	?	?	16
3	Federal	1	5	0	0	?	?	?	4
?	Walwa	?	?	?	?	?	?	?	?

1903 Finals		Team	G	B	Pts	Team	G	B	Pts	Venue
1	Challenge	Corryong	3	5	23	Cudgewa	2	3	15	Cor.

1904 Ladder		Wins	Losses	Draws	Byes	For	Against	%	Pts
1	Cudgewa	?	?	?	?	?	?	?	12
2	Corryong	?	?	?	?	?	?	?	12
3	Towong	?	?	?	?	?	?	?	0
?	Federal	?	?	?	?	?	?	?	?
?	Walwa	?	?	?	?	?	?	?	?

1904 Finals		Team	G	B	Pts	Team	G	B	Pts	Venue
1	Challenge	Cudgewa	4	4	28	Corryong	2	12	24	?

1905–2017

2018 Ladder		Wins	Losses	Draws	Byes	For	Against	%	Pts
1	Bullioh	15	0	0	0	2218	602	368.44%	60
2	Federal	11	4	0	0	1753	1020	171.86%	44
3	Cudgewa	9	6	0	0	1519	1156	131.40%	36
4	Corryong	7	8	0	0	1424	1420	100.28%	28
5	Border-Walwa	2	13	0	0	882	2255	39.11%	8
6	Tumbarumba	1	14	0	0	830	2173	38.20%	4

2018 Finals		Team	G	B	Pts	Team	G	B	Pts	Venue
1	1st semi	Cudgewa	9	7	61	Corryong	9	13	67	Cud.
2	2nd semi	Bullioh	16	14	110	Federal	9	16	70	Why.
3	Preliminary	Federal	19	14	128	Corryong	13	7	85	Cor.
4	Grand	Bullioh	12	80	90	Federal	9	8	62	Why.

2019 Ladder		Wins	Losses	Draws	Byes	For	Against	%	Pts
1	Cudgewa	14	1	0	0	2982	432	691.90%	56
2	Bullioh	12	2	1	0	2744	561	489.13%	50
3	Federal	7	7	1	0	1359	1537	88.42%	30
4	Tumbarunba	7	8	0	0	1252	1655	75.65%	28
5	Corryong	4	11	0	0	762	2189	34.81%	16
6	Border-Walwa	0	15	0	0	194	2926	6.63%	0

2019 Finals		Team	G	B	Pts	Team	G	B	Pts	Venue
1	1st semi	Federal	27	9	171	Tumbarumba	7	8	50	Cor.
2	2nd semi	Cudgewa	11	9	75	Bullioh	10	10	70	Cud.
3	Preliminary	Bullioh	24	19	163	Federal	12	4	76	Why.
4	Grand	Cudgewa	7	14	56	Bullioh	12	10	82	Cud.

==== Interleague / community championships matches ====
The Upper Murray Football League won the North East Riverina Leagues Championships in 1969, 1976, & 1977 with Kevin Mack as Captain-Coach & John Cornish as Vice Captain. Also in 1977 John Cornish (from Tumbarumba FC) winning "Best player from all leagues in series", Kevin Mack (from Corryong FC) winning "Best player on ground against Hume League", & Craig Whitehead (from Corryong FC) winning "Best player on ground against Ovens & King". The interleague senior football match results below are via the official Ovens and King Football Netball League website.

Year	Captain	Coach	Venue	UMFL Score	Match Result	UMFL Opposition	Match Score	Date/Comments
1898			Tallangatta	4.4 - 28	defeated	Tallangatta	3.4 - 22	13.8.1898
1908	Ernie Whitehead		Albury	5.3 - 33	lost to	Albury	6.9 - 45	19.08.1908
1932		Jack Greenhill	Match cancelled			Wangaratta		24/9/32
1937				6.8 - 44	defeated	Granya	5.11 - 41	4/9/37
1964		Greg Tate	Jindera			Hume FL		6.9.1964
1969			Martin Park, Wodonga	8.15 - 63	defeated	Ovens & King FL	8.5 - 53	11.6.69 - G Final
1970			Martin Park, Wodonga	5.12 - 42	lost to	Ovens & King FL	16.14 - 110	1.8.70 - G Final
1974			Baarmutha Park, Beechworth	12.9 - 81	lost to	Ovens & King FL	20.14 - 134	13.7.74
1977	Kevin Mack	Kevin Mack	Corryong Rec Reserve	18.3 - 111	defeated	Ovens & King FL	15.12 - 102	11.6.77 - G Final
1979			Tarrawingee Rec Reserve	14.12 - 96	lost to	Ovens & King FL	28.19 - 187	26.5.79
1980	Bruce Forbes	Bruce Forbes	Corryong Rec Reserve	14.19 - 103	lost to	Ovens & King FL	20.12 - 132	31.5.80
1989			Corryong Rec Reserve	19.14 - 128	defeated	Ovens & King FL	13.19 - 97	3.6.89
1991			Tarrawingee Rec Reserve	6.6 - 42	lost to	Ovens & King FL	28.29 - 197	25.5.91

== Individual awards ==
=== Best and Fairest / Goalkicking Award ===
In 1895, a gold medal was presented to Corryong's Frank Cain for "the best football player in the Upper Murray".

An award for the "most popular footballer" in the Upper Murray FA was awarded by Mrs Jones from the Kia Ora Cafe in 1922 and in 1923 Mrs Jones awarded a gold medal to the "best all-round footballer" and was voted on by the general public.

An award for the "best all-round footballer" in the Upper Murray Football Association was awarded in 1926 and was also voted on by the general public. In 1926 and 1927 there was no fewer than four different football awards donated by local business owners in the Upper Murray FA. These were - Mrs Selina Jane McDonough's Crystal Cafe, Mrs Graham's, Mr Anderson and Mr & Mrs McCully. There seemed to be an extraordinary number of public votes for these awards between 1922 and 1936 for such a small population base, but it is all documented in past issues of the Corryong Courier newspaper, which are referenced below.

The first official UMFA senior football best and fairest cup award was donated by M Stafford from the Corryong Hotel and presented in 1940 and was voted on by the match day umpire, with the award being a cash award of £3/3 in 1945 and £6/5 in 1946. Donor, Taiton A Edwards donated a silver cup for the award from 1947 to 1952.

At some unknown point, the UMFL senior football best and fairest award was called the McAuliffe Medal.

Multiple UMFNL Best & Fairest Winners

- 4 - Mark Albers - Border-Walwa
- 3 - Murray Jarvis - Cudgewa
- 3 - Les Harrison - Cudgewa
- 3 - Evan Nicholas - Corryong
- 2 - Harold Purss - Walwa
- 2 - Kevin Smith - Federal
- 2 - Tony Emerson - Border-Walwa
- 2 - Laurie McInnes - Federal
- 2 - Karl Elliott - Bullioh
- 2 - Brent Ohlin - Federal
- 2 - James Waters - Tumbarumba

Most goals in a match

- 23 - John Spencer (Cudgewa) v Corryong, Rd.3 2025
- 21 - Rod Lees (Corryong) v Cudgewa, 1988
- 20 - Kylin Morey (Cudgewa) v Federal, Rd.3 2021
- 19 - Mark Fitzgerald (Cudgewa) v Tumbarumba, 1971
- 18 - Larry Harris (Corryong) v Tintaldra, 1953.

Most goals in a grand final

- 12 - Darryl Jordan: (Federal) v Cudgewa, 1986
- 11 - Shayne Ried: (Bullioh) v Corryong, 2008

Century Goalkickers

- 1951 - Larry Harris: Corryong
- 1953 - Larry Harris: Corryong
- 1978 - Chris McInnes: Corryong
- 1979 - Darryl Jordan: Federal
- 1983 - Darryl Jordan: Federal
- 1986 - Darryl Jordan: Federal
- 1987 - Darryl Jordan: Federal
- 2002 - Ross Hillary: Corryong
- 2006 - Clinton Tonkin: Bullioh
- 2017 - Jarrod Williams: Corryong
- 2019 - Ashley Murray: Bullioh
- 2025 - John Spencer: Cudgewa

=== Senior Football ===
	UMFA Best Player Award				Leading Goalkicker Award		
Year	Votes	Player	Club	Award Donor	Goals	Player	Club
1895		Frank Cain	Corryong				
1896					10	D Whitehead	Cudgewa
1922		Gold Medal: William Murrell	Corryong	Mrs Jones, Kia Ora Cafe (most popular)			
1923	14,116	Gold Medal: Charlie Greenhill	Corryong	Mrs Jones, Kia Ora Cafe (best player)			
1926	23,313	Gold Medal: Colin Lennox	Federal	Mrs McDonough's Cafe (best player)			
	13,780	Silver Medal: Jack Greenhill	Corryong	Mrs McDonough's Cafe (best player)			
		Gold Watch: Dick Smith	Corryong	Mr & Mrs McCully (most popular)			
		Gold Medal: Jack Greenhill	Corryong	Mr & Mrs Graham (most popular)			
1927	33,666	Jack White	Federal	Mrs McDonough's Cafe (best player)			
		A Whitsed	Corryong	Mrs Graham (most popular)			
	14,915	W Krausgrill	Corryong	Mr Anderson (most popular)			
1928	43,688	Jack White	Federal	Mrs McDonough's Crystal Cafe			
1929	30,750	Goldie Whitehead	Federal	Mrs McDonough's Crystal Cafe			
1931	14,375	S McKenzie	Federal	Mrs McDonough's Crystal Cafe	27	M Smith	Federal
1936	831	W Murrell	Corryong	Management: Local Talkies			
Upper Murray FA: Official Best & Fairest Award - 1940 to present day
1940	?	Private A B Lloyd	Federal	Stafford's Corryong Hotel			
1941-44		UMFA in recess >	World War Two				
1945	?	Harold Purss	Walwa	£3/3: Chas McNamara			
1946	?	Harold Purss	Walwa	£6/5/: General donations			
1947	28	Murray Jarvis	Cudgewa	TA Edwards, Albury Dentist			
1948	22	Jack Edmondson	Federal	T A Edwards, Albury Dentist			
1949	24 (24)	Murray Murrell; John Couttie *	Corryong; Federal	T A Edwards, Albury Dentist			
1950	24	Murray Jarvis	Cudgewa	TA Edwards, Albury Dentist			
1951	26	Bob Chomley	Tintaldra	T A Edwards, Albury Dentist	90 (103)	Larry Harris	Corryong
1952	25	Murray Jarvis	Cudgewa	T A Edwards, Albury Dentist	51 (65)	Larry Harris	Corryong
1953		Jack Lowthian	Walwa		108	Larry Harris	Corryong
1954		Les Harrison	Cudgewa		59	Larry Harris	Corryong
1955		Les Harrison	Cudgewa		58	Bill Moon	Corryong
1956	34	Les Harrison	Cudgewa	Ivan Drummond	66	Graham Gadd	Walwa
1957		Barry Bryant	Walwa		66	Graham Gadd	Walwa
1958	?	Mick Boswell	Border United		52	John Hadley	Corryong
1959	20	Max Hore	Walwa		68	Barry Laverty	Cudgewa
1960		Kevin Smith	Federal		64	Cliff Daly	Corryong
1961		Kevin Smith	Federal		62	Colin Fletcher	Cudgewa
1962		Peter Chitty	Cudgewa		62	Glen Whitehead	Corryong
1963	?	Merv Clarke	Tintaldra Khancoban		79 (82)	Ian Todd	Corryong
1964	15	Noel Richardson	Corryong		75	Ian Todd	Corryong
1965		C Pagononi	Tintaldra Khancoban		39	Ted McSweeney	Federal
1966		Tony Smedley	Cudgewa		58	Merv Ward	Cudgewa
1967	22	Ian Moscrop	Cudgewa		37	Merv Ward	Cudgewa
1968		Ross McKimmie	Federal		26	Greg Smith	Federal
1969		Tony Emerson	Border-Walwa		61	Tony Smedley	Cudgewa
1970		Tony Emerson	Border-Walwa		43	John Chitty	Cudgewa
1971		Noel Byatt	Cudgewa		56	Herb Maloney	Federal
1972	16	John Merrick	Corryong		56	Tom Smedley	Cudgewa
1973		Ken Land	Cudgewa		43; 43	Chris McInnes; Robin Taylor	Corryong; Border Walwa
1974		John Cornish	Tumbarumba		37	Merv Ward	Cudgewa
1975	15	Tom Buscombe	Corryong		32	John Whitsed	Federal
1976		Bertie Haynes	Tumbarumba		40	Bertie Haynes	Tumbarumba
1977		John Mulligan	Cudgewa		80	Darryl Jordan	Federal
1978	22	Peter White	Tumbarumba		115	Chris McInnes	Corryong
1979	23	Phil Byatt	Cudgewa		127 (143)	Darryl Jordan	Federal
1980	19 (19)	Bruce Forbes; Doug Paton	Tumbarumba; Federal		92	Chris McInnes	Corryong
1981		Doug Paton	Federal		53	Alan Politis	Cudgewa
1982		Ron Hystek	Tumbarumba		61	Michael Dobson	Tumut
1983		Mark Hallinan	Border-Walwa		92 (103)	Darryl Jordan	Federal
1984		David Greenhill	Corryong		65	Scott Drummond	Border-Walwa
1985	18	Ian Edmondson	Cudgewa	Ron Hoban Trophy	72	Brett Richter	Corryong
1986		Paul McInerney	Border-Walwa		105 (129)	Darryl Jordan	Federal
1987		Stephen Brown	Corryong		127 (140)	Darryl Jordan	Federal
1988		John Bloom; Chris Graham	Cudgewa; Cudgewa		119	Rod Lees	Corryong
1989		Jon Collins	Federal		54	Bruce Shea	Federal
1990	19	Mark Albers	Border-Walwa		58	Darryl Jordan	Federal
1991		Mark Albers	Border-Walwa		61	Luke Ellis	Border-Walwa
1992	18	Wayne Edwards	Border-Walwa		47	Wayne Edwards	Border-Walwa
1993		Brendan Attree; Steve McCormack	Corryong; Border-Walwa		44	Clinton Griffiths	Federal
1994	11	Paul Williams	Tumbarumba		37	Clinton Griffiths	Federal
1995		Peter Tolsher	Federal		47	Neville Deery	Cudgewa
1996		Mark Albers	Border-Walwa		52	Ron Harris	Federal
1997		Mark Albers	Border-Walwa		66	Robert Newnham	Border-Walwa
1998		Baxter Oliver	Federal		55	Justin Gregory	Tumbarumba
1999		Kevin Hunt; Laurie McInnes	Border-Walwa; Federal		53	Matt Dingey	Border-Walwa
2000		Alby Freijah; Laurie McInnes	Corryong; Federal		47	Greg Andrew; Lindsay Seymour	Cudgewa; Tumbarumba
2001	24	Michael Wild	Corryong		39	Carlo Visser	Federal
2002	19	Rick Sibraa	Border Walwa		90 (100)	Ross Hilliary	Corryong
2003	24	Ian McKimmie	Federal		72	Scott Byatt	Federal
2004		Karl Elliott	Bullioh		54	Matthew Hayes	Corryong
2005		Karl Elliott	Bullioh		61	Michael Mathey	Federal
2006		Evan Nicholas	Corryong		100	Clinton Tonkin	Federal
2007	13	Mark Nichol; Neville Nugent	Bullioh; Federal		71	Shane Reid	Bullioh
2008		Bill Nichol	Bullioh		60	Matthew Hayes	Corryong
2009		James Cleven	Cudgewa		72 (78)	Clinton Tolkin	Bullioh
2010		Warren Sinclair	Federal		70 (74)	Shane Ried	Bullioh
2011		John Forrest	Federal		76 (83)	Tom Hickey	Bullioh
2012		Evan Nicholas	Corryong		62 (65)	Tom Hickey	Bullioh
2013	20	Evan Nicholas; Stephen Barnes	Corryong; Tumbarumba		80 (90)	Matthew Molkentin	Tumbarumba
2014	17	Shannon Gilson	Corryong		52	Ben Carey	Tumbarumba
2015		Brent Ohlin	Federal		54 (64)	Ben Carey	Tumbarumba
2016		Brent Ohlin	Federal		62 (62)	Matt Bradshaw	Federal
2017		Daniel McCarthy	Border-Walwa		101 (108)	Jarrod Williams	Corryong
2018	22	Zach Burhop	Bullioh		52 (54)	Zach Burhop	Bullioh
2019	22	Tom McKimmie	Federal		135 (160)	Ashley Murray	Bullioh
2020		UMFNL in recess	due to COVID-19				
2021		?			61 (N/A)	Kylin Morey	Cudgewa
2022		Jacob Read; James Waters	Tumbarumba; Tumbarumba		61 (68)	Nick Brockley	Cudgewa
2023	15	James Waters	Tumbarumba		58 (71)	Adam Prior	Cudgewa
2024	14	Grady Nigsch	Cudgewa		71 (73)	Guy Telford	Cudgewa
2025	9 (11)	Clint Brunnenmeyer; John Spencer *	Bullioh; Cudgewa		95 (106)	John Spencer	Cudgewa
2026	16	Nicholas Molkentin	Tumbarumba		44 (58); 44 (53)	Samuel Clarke; Ben Hall	Tumbarumba; Cudgewa
2027							
Year	Votes	Player	Club	Award Donor	Goals	Player	Club

- Goalkicking: Brackets () includes goals kicked in finals.
- 1949 - John Couttie (Federal) tied with the winner on votes but finished as runner up under the old countback system.
- 1980 - Doug Paton (Federal) tied with the winner on votes but finished as runner up under the old countback system.
- 2025 - John Spencer (Cudgewa) polled the most votes (11) but was deemed ineligible due to a one-week suspension for umpire abuse in round four.

=== Reserves Football ===
	UMFL Best & Fairest Award				Leading Goalkicking Award		
Year	Votes	Player	Club	B & F Donor	Goals	Player	Club
1964	13	W Schmehl	?				
1968	14	John Bryant	Border Walwa				
1972	14	Graham McInnes	Federal				
1975	10	Graham McInnes	Federal				
1979	20	C Akers	Tumut				
1980	16	Brian McNamara	Cudgewa				
1981							
1985		Peter Beckwith	Cudgewa				
1990	11	Shane Mitchell	Border Walwa		30	P McCormack	Border Walwa
1992	19	Gordon Paton	Federal				
1993							
1994	16	Brian McNamara	Cudgewa				
2007	14	Andrew Stevens	Federal		50	Peter Scammell	Federal
2008							
2009					35 (43)	Damien Swaby	Bullioh
2010					60 (63)	Alastair Campbell	Bullioh
2011					67 (72)	Damien Swaby	Bullioh
2012							
2013		Brendan Lane	Tumbarumba				
2014					44 (51)	Mathew Tyrell	Bullioh
2015					16	Brady McKimmie	Federal
2016		Brendon Lane	Tumbarumba		39 (45)	Peter Scammell	Federal
2017					39 (56)	Matthew Jones	Federal
2018	13	Ben Parker	Bullioh		68	Mark Boyle	Corryong
2019	6	Ben Parker	Bullioh		27	Ben Parker	Bullioh
2020		UMFNL in recess	due to COVID-19				
2021		?			22	Greg Wheeler	Cudgewa
2022		Brad Simmonds	Bullioh		25 (27)	Jaymin Fenton	Bullioh
2023		Joel Cook	Bullioh		52 (55)	Shane Price	Bullioh
2024		Luke Rafferty	Bullioh		72 (75)	Aaron Barnes	Bullioh
2025	17	Brad Simmonds	Bullioh		55 (57)	Aaron Barnes	Bullioh
2026	20	Brent King	Bullioh		38	Ben Parker	Bullioh
2027							
Year	Votes	Player	Club	Award Donor	Goals	Player	Club

=== Thirds Football ===
	UMFL Best & Fairest Award				Leading Goalkicking Award		
Year	Votes	Player	Club	B & F Donor	Goals	Player	Club
1972	27	Peter Shaw	Corryong				
1975		Craig Whitehead	Corryong				
1980	24	John Carkeek	Cudgewa				
1990	19	Adrian Whitehead	Federal				
1992	18	Brad Burgess	Cudgewa				
2001	13	Matthew Molkentin	Tumbarumba				
2012		Thomas Bennetts	Tumbarumba				
2013		Thomas Bennetts	Tumbarumba				
2024		Charlie Kemp	Corryong		53 (59)	Heath Mulligan	Cudgewa
2025					32 (34)	Harrison Nicholas	Corryong
2026	18	Darcy McGee	Tumbarumba		28 (33)	Matthew Thomas	Tumbarumba
2027							

==== Life Members ====
Upper Murray FNL: Life Members
Year Inducted	Inductee	Notes
(N/A)	Arthur R. Nickless	Upper Murray Football League * (No life membership awarded) * President: 1972–1977 Victoria Country Football League * VCFL Service Medallion; M.B.D. Football Council * Delegate for the Upper Murray Football League 1977
[Pre-1977]	Alan M. Vogel	Upper Murray Football League * President: 1961, 1965, 1970
[Pre-1977]	Clive McAuliffe	Upper Murray Football League * President: 1964 * Vice President: 1977 * Inter-League Manager: 1977 Victoria Country Football League * VCFL Service Medallion; M.B.D. Football Council * Delegate for the Upper Murray Football League 1977
[Pre-1977]	Col McClure (dec.)	Upper Murray Football League * Secretary: 1945–1962 * Ball Committee: 1977 Victoria Country Football League * VCFL Service Medallion
[Pre-1977]	G. C. Hamilton (dec.)	Upper Murray Football League * President: 1959; *Corryong
	George Turner	[?]
[?]	Jack Hallinan	Border-Walwa FNC * Formed the Junior Border-Walwa Football team * Arranged entry into the Upper Murray Football Association * Coached & organized juniors * Club Secretary: 10 Seasons Upper Murray Football League * Tribunal Representative; Ovens and Murray Football League * Appeals Board; Victoria Country Football League * Delegate for the Upper Murray Football League
[?]	Jeff Ross	Upper Murray Football League Secretary
[?]	Milne "Spud" Bryant	Walwa FC
[?]	Norm Hughes	Walwa FC
1976	Ron G. Clarke (dec.)	Tintaldra FC * Player: 1951–1959 * Club Best & Fairest: 1958 * President: 1960–1961 Tintaldra-Khancoban United FC * President: 1963–1966; Upper Murray Football League * President: 1962, 1967 * Vice-president: 6 Seasons * Secretary: 10 Seasons * Assistant Secretary: 1 Season * Tribunal Representative: 3 Seasons * Ball Committee: 1977
2013	Mont Waters	Tumbarumba FC
2026	Rebecca Clarke	Tumbarumba FC

==== VFL / AFL Players ====
The following former Upper Murray FL players have gone onto play senior VFL / AFL football. James Jordan is the son of former Federal player, Daryl Jordan and Harry Dean is the son of former Carlton and Bullioh player, Peter Dean.

VFL / AFL - Australian Rules Football Players

Player	Local Club	VFL/AFL Club	Recruited/Drafted	Debut	Years	Games	Goals	Jumper No.
Jimmy Seaton	Corryong	Collingwood	1912: (via Corryong)	1912: Round 18 vs South Melbourne	1912	1	2	
Jack Greenhill	Corryong	Carlton	1917: (via Corryong)	1917: Round 2 vs Collingwood	1917, 1920–21, 1923	41	4	#17(1917) #6 (1920) #29(1921) #6(1923)
Charlie Greenhill	Corryong	Carlton	1922: (via Corryong)	1922:	1922	3	0	
Eric Humphrey	Corryong	Carlton	1922: (via Corryong)	1922:	1922	4	1	#29
Peter Chitty	Cudgewa	St. Kilda	1936: (via Albury)	1936: Round 11 vs Fitzroy	1936	2	0	#36
Bob Chitty	Cudgewa	Carlton	1936: (via Sunshine)	1937: Round 7 vs Footscray	1937–1946	147	32	#33 (1937) #6 (38–46)
Frank Hanna	Walwa	Melbourne	1947: (via Walwa)	1947: Round 2 vs Geelong	1922	30	3	#24
Lance Mann	Walwa	Essendon	1951: (via Albury)	1951: Round 6 vs Fitzroy	1951	80	22	#32(51–54) #7 (58–59)
Barry Bryant	Walwa	Carlton	1960: (via Kyabram)	1960: Round 2 vs Fitzroy	1960	14	5	#11
Kevin Smith	Federal	Richmond	1964: (via Myrtleford)	1964: Round 1 vs Footscray	1964–1966	47	3	#26
Darryl Herrod	Federal	Geelong (1966–1967); Fitzroy (1968–1971)	1966: (via Assumption College)	1966: Round 3 vs Footscray	1966–1971	54	1	#13 (66–67) #19 (68–71)
Wennie Van Lint	Tintaldra-Khancoban United	South Melbourne	1967: (via Albury)	1967: Round 16 vs Collingwood	1967	2	0	#32
Barry Mugeli	Corryong	Collingwood	1967: (from Corryong)	1968: Round 16 vs Hawthorn	1968	3	0	#49
Dennis Carroll	Tumbarumba	Sydney	1981: (via Albury)	1981: Round 8 vs Melbourne	1981–1993	219	117	#7
Jonathan Collins	Federal	North Melbourne (1983–85); St. Kilda (1986–87)	1983: (via Wodonga)	1983: Round 17 vs Collingwood	1983–87	40	11	#44 (1983) #11 (84–85) #15 (86–87)
Adrian Whitehead	Federal	Carlton	1992 – National Pick #43: (via Wodonga)	1994: Round 3 vs Geelong	1992–1999	63	22	#32
Shaun Atley	Federal	North Melbourne	2010 – National Pick #17: (via Murray Bushrangers)	2011: Round 1 vs West Coast Eagles	2011–2021	234	44	#18
James Jordan	Federal	Melbourne	2018– National Pick #33: (via Yarrawonga)	2021: Round 1 vs Fremantle	2019–2025	133^{A}	41^{A}	#17
Harry Dean	Bullioh	Carlton	2025 – National Pick #3: (via Lavington)	2026: Rd. 1 vs Sydney Swans	2026	18^{A}	1^{A}	#35
Player	Local Club	VFL/AFL Club	Recruited/Drafted	Debut	Years	Games	Goals	Jumper No.

Notes:
^{A} Stats correct to the end of the 2026 Home & Away season.

== Netball honour boards ==
History

It appears that the Upper Murray Basketball (Netball) Association was formed in June 1946 with four newly formed teams and this female sport was initially called "basketball" until 1970, when it was changed to "netball" for the 1971 season.

In Australia, the term women's basketball was used to refer to both netball and basketball. During the 1950s and 1960s, a movement arose to change the Australian name of the game from women's basketball to netball in order to avoid confusion between the two sports. The Australian Basketball Union offered to pay the costs involved to alter the name, but the netball organisation rejected the change. In 1970, the Council of the All Australia Netball Association officially changed the name to "netball" in Australia.

Upper Murray BA Teams

- Berringama: 1947–49, 1951-
- Colac Colac: 1946-
- Corryong: 1946-
- Cudgewa: 1946–49, 1951-
- Cudgewa North: 1948–50,
- Elliott: 1951-
- GFS: 1946–50,
- Kiwis: 1950,
- Koalas: 1950,
- Thougla: 1948, 1950,
- Tintaldra: 1948–49,
- Walwa: 1947-

=== Netball Premiers ===
Upper Murray Netball: 1946 to 1970
Upper Murray Basketball (Netball) Association: Grand Final teams

Season	A-Grade: 1946–1970	B-Grade	C-Grade	D-Grade	14's & Under	11's & Under
1946	Colac Colac d Corryong					
1947	Cudgewa d Colac Colac					
1948	Colac Colac d Corryong					
1949	Colac Colac d Corryong					
1950	Corryong d Koalas					
1951	Elliott d Colac Colac					
1952	Colac Colac d Elliott					
1953	Elliott					
1954						
1955						
1956						
1957						
1958						
1959						
1960						
1972	Corryong 23 d Federal 22	Tindaldra 34 d Waratah Brown 33				
Upper Murray Football / Netball League
Season	A-Grade	B-Grade	C-Grade	D-Grade	14's & Under	11's & Under
2000	Unknown	Unknown	Unknown	Unknown	Unknown ^{1}	Unknown
2001	Unknown	Unknown	Unknown	Unknown	Unknown ^{1}	Unknown
2002	Unknown	Unknown	Unknown	Unknown	Unknown ^{1}	Unknown
2003	Unknown	Federal	Unknown	Unknown	Unknown ^{1}	Unknown
2004	Federal	Unknown	Unknown	Unknown	Unknown ^{1}	Unknown
2005	Federal	Unknown	Federal	Unknown	Unknown ^{1}	Unknown
2006	Federal	Unknown	Unknown	Unknown	Unknown ^{1}	Unknown
2007	Federal d Tumbarumba	Bullioh d Cudgewa	Cudgewa d Bullioh		Unknown ^{1}	Unknown
2008	Federal d Cudgewa	Cudgewa d Corryong	Cudgewa d Federal	Tumbarumba d Cudgewa	Unknown ^{1}	Unknown
2009	Federal	Unknown	Unknown	Unknown	Unknown ^{1}	Unknown
2010	Federal	Federal	Federal	Unknown	Unknown ^{1}	Unknown
2011	Federal	Federal	Federal	Unknown	Unknown ^{1}	Unknown
2012	Federal	Federal	Federal	Unknown	Unknown ^{1}	Unknown
					15's & Under	
2013	Federal	Federal	Cudgewa	Cudgewa	Federal	Unknown
2014	Border-Walwa	Border-Walwa	Federal	Federal	Federal	Unknown
2015	Cudgewa	Federal	Corryong	Tumbarumba	Federal	Unknown
2016	Tumbarumba	Cudgewa	Federal	Federal	Federal	Unknown
2017	Bullioh d Federal	Bullioh d Corryong	Federal d Corryong	Federal d Bullioh	Corryong d Federal	Unknown
2018	Cudgewa d Corryong	Cudgewa d Corryong	Bullioh d Cudgewa	Federal d Bullioh	Bullioh d Federal	Unknown
2019	Federal v Cudgewa	Cudgewa v Federal	Bullioh v Tumarumba	Tumbarumba v Federal	Tumbarumba v Border Walwa	Unknown
2020	UMFNL in recess > COVID-19	UMFNL in recess > COVID-19	UMFNL in recess > COVID-19	UMFNL in recess > COVID-19	UMFNL in recess > COVID-19	UMFNL in recess > COVID-19
2021 season abandoned after 11 matches. No finals series played due to COVID-19. 2021 Minor Premiers listed below.
2021	1st: 2nd:	1st: 2nd:	1st: 2nd:	1st: 2nd:	1st: 2nd:	?
2022	Tumbarumba d Cudgewa	Cudgewa d Bullioh	Bullioh d Tumbarumba	Bullioh d Tumbarumba	Federal d Bullioh	?
2023	Cudgewa d Tumbarumba	Cudgewa d Bullioh	Bullioh d Tumbarumba	Bullioh d Corryong	Tumbarumba d Cudgewa	Tumbarumba v Cudgewa
2024	Cudgewa v Bullioh	Cudgewa d Bullioh	Corryong d Bullioh	Tumbarumba d Bullioh	Cudgewa d Tumbarumba	Cudgewa v Bullioh
2025	Cudgewa d Corryong	Cudgewa d Bullioh	Cudgewa d Corryong	Tumbarumba d Corryong	Tumbarumba d Cudgewa	Tumbarumba d Bullioh
2026	Cudgewa 34 d Corryong 27	Bullioh 49 d Cudgewa 35	Corryong 29 d Cudgewa 28	Cudgewa 23 d Corryong 19	Bullioh 26 d Tumbarumba 22	Tumbarumba 24 d Cudgewa 19

Notes:
^{1} Ran as a "14's & Under" competition between 2001 & 2012.

=== Netball Best & Fairest Winners ===
In 1953, Miss Una Murrell (Club ?) received the Upper Murray Basketball (Netball) Association best and fairest award, donated by Mrs E Whitehead.

2001–2027: A, B & C Grades

Upper Murray Football Netball League
Season	A-Grade (votes)	Club	B-Grade	Club	C-Grade	Club
2001	Tasanee James (16)	Corryong	Belinda McLellan	Border Walwa	Unknown	Unknown
2002	Unknown	Unknown	Unknown	Unknown	Unknown	Unknown
2003	Unknown	Unknown	Unknown	Unknown	Unknown ^{1}	Unknown
2004	Chrissie McKimmie	Federal	Tonia Turner	Federal	Unknown	Unknown
2005	Unknown	Unknown	Unknown	Unknown	Unknown	Unknown
2006	Unknown	Unknown	Unknown	Unknown	Unknown	Unknown
2007	Chrissie McKimmie	Federal	Unknown	Unknown	Unknown	Unknown
2008	Amy Paton	Federal	Unknown	Unknown	Unknown	Unknown
2009	Unknown	Unknown	Unknown	Unknown	Unknown	Unknown
2010	Chrissie McKimmie	Federal	Unknown	Unknown	Unknown	Unknown
2011	Unknown	Unknown	Sallie Findlay	Federal	Unknown	Unknown
2012	Unknown	Unknown	Georgia Coysh	Federal	Sarah Triggs	Federal
2013	Emily Jones (21)	Bullioh	Katie Hewatt (17)	Unknown	Jahla Hunt (21)	Unknown
2014	Unknown	Unknown	Nikki Nugent	Federal	Unknown	Unknown
2015	Unknown	Unknown	Unknown	Unknown	Unknown	Unknown
2016	Sallie Findlay	Federal	Unknown	Unknown	Unknown	Unknown
2017	Sophie Pattison	Federal	Unknown	Unknown	Unknown	Unknown
2018	Leah Mathey (21)	Federal	Tiarnee Hunt	Federal	Unknown	Unknown
2019	Sophie Pattison (22)	Federal	Christine McKimmie	Federal	Tania Campbell	Bullioh
2020 - Upper Murray FNL - In recess > COVID-19
2021 - Upper Murray FNL -No finals series due to COVID-19
2021						
2022	Bridget Rhynehart	Tumbarumba	Casey Tyrell	Federal	Clare McCormack	Bullioh
2023	Megan Nankervis	Cudgewa	Charlotte Star	Cudgewa	Bella Paton	Bullioh
2024	Kirsty Hodgkin; Malory Nankervis	Bullioh; Cudgewa	Ruby McCourt	Bullioh	Zoe McKimmie	Cudgewa
2025	Bridgette Brunnenmeyer (15)	Bullioh	Dianne Plunkett (13)	Bullioh	Jess Damm (15)	Corryong
2026	Rachel Cogan (14)	Corryong	Zoe McKimmie (16)	Cudgewa	Elly Craighead (14)	Corryong
2027						

Notes:

2001–2027: D Grade, 15's & Under & 11's & Under

Upper Murray Football Netball League
Season	D-Grade	Club	15's & Under	Club	11's & Under	Club
2013	Kate McCallum (29)	Unknown	Unknown	Unknown	Unknown	Unknown
2014	()	Unknown	Unknown	Unknown	Unknown	Unknown
2015	()	Unknown	Unknown	Unknown	Unknown	Unknown
2016	()	Unknown	Unknown	Unknown	Unknown	Unknown
2017	()	Unknown	Unknown	Unknown	Unknown	Unknown
2018	()	Unknown	Unknown	Unknown	Unknown	Unknown
2019	()	Unknown	Orianne Hunt	Federal	Unknown	Unknown
2020 - Upper Murray FNL - In recess > COVID-19
2021 - Upper Murray FNL -No finals series due to COVID-19
2021	()	Unknown	Unknown	Unknown	Unknown	Unknown
2022	Rebecca Clarke (?)	Tumbarumba	Unknown	Unknown	Unknown	Unknown
2023	Kate Butler	Corryong	Ruby Jean Klippel	Cudgewa	Unknown	Unknown
2024	Sarah McKay	Corryong	Ruby Jean Klippel	Cudgewa	Unknown	Unknown
2025	Sally Houghagen (18)	Cudgewa	Mary Middleton (20)	Tumbarumba	Katie Piece (17)	Cudgewa
2026	Sally Houghagen (20)	Cudgewa	Mary Middleton (19)	Tumbarumba	Amity Cameron (19)	Bullioh
2027						

Notes:
^{1} The current 15's & Under ran as an "14's & Under" competition between 2001 & 2014.

=== Leading Goal Scorers ===
1946–2026

Season	A-Grade: 1946–1970	B-Grade	C-Grade	D-Grade	14's & Under	11's & Under
Upper Murray Basketball (Netball) Association
1946						
1947						
1948						
1949	June Rixon-Corryong:(309)^{2}					
1950	June Rixon - Corryong: (343)					
1951	June Schintler - Colac: (201)					
1952	June Schintler - Colac: (206)					
1953	Nola Hillier - Elliott: (307)					
Upper Murray Football / Netball League
Season	A-Grade: 2001–2025	B-Grade	C-Grade	D-Grade	14's & Under	11's & Under
2001	Unknown	Unknown	Unknown	Unknown	Unknown	Unknown
2002	Unknown	Unknown	Unknown	Unknown	Unknown	Unknown
2003	Unknown	Unknown	Unknown	Unknown	Unknown	Unknown
2004	Unknown	Unknown	Unknown	Unknown	Unknown	Unknown
2005	Unknown	Unknown	Unknown	Unknown	Unknown	Unknown
2006	Unknown	Unknown	Unknown	Unknown	Unknown	Unknown
2007	Unknown	Unknown	Unknown	Unknown	Unknown	Unknown
2008	Unknown	Unknown	Unknown	Unknown	Unknown	Unknown
2009	Unknown	Unknown	Unknown	Unknown	Unknown	Unknown
2010	Unknown	Unknown	Unknown	Unknown	Unknown	Unknown
2011	Unknown	Unknown	Unknown	Unknown	Unknown	Unknown
2012	Unknown	Unknown	Unknown	Unknown	Unknown	Unknown
					'15's & Under'	
2013	S-A.Walker (413)	N.Walsh (379)	A.Edwards (206)	K.McCallum (224)	C.McKimmie (175)	Unknown
2014	T.Thorpe, Corryong (558)	C.Beer, Federal (306)	A.Sheather, Federal (223)	M.Galbraith (200)	A.Byrne (229)	Unknown
2015	C.Beer, Federal (361)	A.Sheather, Federal (315)	A.Byrne (179)	M.Galbraith (111)	T.Hunt (198)	()
2016	C.Beer, Federal (353)	A.Sheather, Federal (198)	A.Byrne, (232)	I.Norman, (125)	T.Hunt, (179)	()
2017	()	()	()	()	()	()
2018	()	()	()	()	()	()
2019	()	()	()	()	()	()
2020: UMFNL in recess due to COVID-19
2021: Season abandoned after 11 matches. No finals series played due to COVID-19. Leading goal-shooters listed below.
2021	()	()	()	()	()	()
2022	()	()	()	()	()	()
2023	L Coelli, Bullioh ()	P Brown, Cudgewa ()	T Hussell, ()	I Glass, ()	M McLean, ()	()
2024	()	()	()	()	()	()
2025	()	()	()	()	()	()
2026	T Lebner, Corryong (314)	M Drumgold, Bullioh (335)	E Craighead, Corryong (289)	I McVean, Cudgewa (184)	E Roberts, Bullioh (226)	T Nugent, Cudgewa (100)
2027	()	()	()	()	()	()

Notes:
^{2} 1949: Rixon was leading with 309 goals on the 7th July 1949

=== National League players ===
T.B.A.

=== Inter-League matches ===
T.B.A.

== Officer Bearers ==
There appears to be no references to an official local Corryong and district and / or a Upper Murray football competition between 1893 and 1895 and also between 1898 and 1899.

Year	President	Secretary	Treasurer
1893	?		
1894	?		
1895	?		
Upper Murray Football Association
1896	G Bishop	F M'Donough	
1897		W Denby	
1898	?		
1899	?		
1900		W Denby	
1901	W Farrell	W Denby	
1902	A W Acocks	W Denby	
1903	A W Acocks	W Denby	
1904	A W Acocks	W Denby	
Corryong District Football Association
1904	P Wills	A E Eastlake	A E Eastlake
1905	George Garing	A E Eastlake	A E Eastlake
1906	H W Hood	J F Blair	
Upper Murray Football Association
1907	H W Hood	J F Blair	
1908	H W Hood	J F Blair	
1909	A T Bartlett	J F Blair	
1910	A T Bartlett	J F Blair	
1911	A T Bartlett	J F Blair	
1912	A T Bartlett	J F Blair	
1913	A T Bartlett	J F Blair	
1914	A T Bartlett	J F Blair	
1915	A T Bartlett	J F Blair	J F Blair
1916-17	In recess>WW1		
1918	?		
1919		J F Blair	
1920		J F Blair	
1921		J F Blair	
1922		J F Blair	
1923		J F Blair	
1924		J F Blair	
1925		J F Blair	
1926		J F Blair	
1927	J Mackie	A Waters	A Waters
1928			
1929			
1930	G Hamilton	A Waters	A Waters
1931	C W Eade	W Jeans	
1932			
1933			
1934			
1935			
1936			
1937	George Hughes	G C Hamilton	
1938			
1939	Rev J D Wade	G C Hamilton	G C Hamilton
1940	Jack Hunt	G C Hamilton	
1945	H O Allen	Col McClure	
1946	E A Briggs	Col McClure	C McClure
1947	J Collins	Col McClure	C McClure
1948	Keir McHarg	Col McClure	C McClure
1949	H O Allen	Col McClure	C McClure
1950	Reg Carkeek	Col McClure	
1951		Col McClure	
1952	J J Hunt	Col McClure	C McClure
1953		Col McClure	
1954		Col McClure	
1955		Col McClure	
1956		Col McClure	
1957		Col McClure	
1958		Col McClure	
1959	G C Hamilton	Col McClure	
1960		Col McClure	
1961	Alan M Vogel	Col McClure	
1962	Ron G Clarke	Col McClure	
1963			
1964	Clive McAuliffe		
1965	Alan M Vogel		
1966			
1967	Ron G Clarke		
1968			
1969			
1970	Alan M Vogel		

== General information ==
League Names
1893–1895	Corryong Football Association ?
1896-1899	Upper Murray Football Association
1900–1901	Upper Murray Football Club Association
1902-1903	Upper Murray Football Association
1904–1906	Corryong District Association
1907–1952	Upper Murray Football Association
1953–2000	Upper Murray Football League
2001–present	Upper Murray Football Netball League
2025 Compertitions
Football	UMFNL Seniors; UMFNL Reserves; ~~UMFNL Under 16's~~ UMFNL Under 14's UMFNL Under 12's UMFNL Under 10's (Auskick)
Netball	UNFNL A-Grade; UMFNL B-Grade; UMFNL C-Grade; UMFNL D-Grade; UMFNL Under 15's UMFNL Under 11's (Netta)

Men's Leagues
Ovens & King
Ovens & Murray
Tallangata & District
Upper Murray
Women's Leagues
AFLNEB Female
Junior Leagues
Albury Wodonga Junior
Wangaratta & District Junior

== See also ==
- Australian rules football in Victoria
- Australian rules football in New South Wales
- Zoning in Australian Rules Football
- List of Australian rules football clubs by date of establishment
- Tallangatta & District Football League
- Farrer Football League
- 1940 list of Upper Murray men who joined the 2nd A.I.F.
- 1992 AFL draft
- 2010 AFL draft
