= Cudgewa Football Netball Club =

Cudgewa Blues
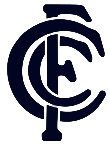

Names
- Full name: Cudgewa Football Netball Club
- Nickname: Blues

Club details
- Founded: 1892; 134 years ago
- Colours: dark blue white
- Competition: UMFNL
- Premierships: UMFNL: 31 List: 1896, 1904, 1907, 1911, 1913, 1914, 1919, 1921, 1938, 1939, 1946, 1947, 1952, 1953, 1954, 1961, 1962, 1963, 1966, 1967, 1970, 1971, 1973, 1974, 1979, 1981, 1999, 2000, 2014, 2015, 2023
- Ground: Cudgewa Recreation Reserve

Uniforms
Home

Other information
- Official website: Cudgewa FNC

Cudgewa Football Netball Club, nicknamed the Blues, is an Australian rules football club which plays in the Upper Murray Football League. The club is based in Victorian town of Cudgewa and plays its home games at the Cudgewa Recreation Reserve. The club fields senior, reserve and junior sides as well as fielding all netball sides.

== History ==
The Blues were among the founding members of a local football competition, which became the Upper Murray Football Association in 1896.

In April 1896, the Corryong Courier published an article that a discussion took place at the 1896 Corryong FC annual general meeting about establishing a local football competition, and a motion was passed to arrange for the Corryong FC secretary to communicate with kindred clubs suggesting that delegates be appointed to meet and discuss the formation of a local football competition.

In May 1896, the Upper Murray Football Association was formed at Master's Hotel, with Mr G Bishop as the association's first president and Mr F M'Donough as the secretary and an official fixture arranged.

The side finished second in its debut season and again in 1895 before claiming its first premiership in 1896. This inaugural flag was won on the basis of the number of premiership points attained during the home and away season, but by the time Cudgewa next went top, in 1904, the association had introduced a finals system. The Blues won that year's grand final against Corryong, and by the time of the outbreak of World War One, Cudgewa had added further such triumphs at the expense of Federal in 1911, Corryong in 1913, and Federal in 1914.

Between the wars Cudgewa claimed another four premierships but it was during the first four decades after World War Two that the club really came into its own. Over the course of the forty-one season period from 1946 to 1986 the Blues contested no fewer than twenty-four senior grade grand finals, winning sixteen of them.

One of Cudgewa's all time greats was former captain-coach, Ben Byatt who coached seven premierships during his 12 years as coach and played over 400 games.

== 2000 and Beyond ==
Since the late 1990s Cudgewa has experienced mixed success under a variety of coaches starting by going back to back Premiers in 1999 and 2000. However, by the early 2000s the Blues were struggling with the retirement of several older players and the reformation of the Bullioh Football Club the Blues were drained of many of its better players. For the rest of the decade the Blues made the finals on only 4 occasions as they slowly rebuilt with some of the more promising players in the competition. By 2011 under new coach Bill Deery, and with a host of new recruits, the club made a resurgence to reach the Grand Final only to be defeated by Bullioh by 63 points in the decider.

== Football Premierships ==
Upper Murray Football Netball League

Senior Football (31)

- 1896, 1904, 1907, 1911, 1913, 1914, 1919, 1921, 1938, 1939, 1946, 1947, 1952, 1953, 1954, 1961, 1962, 1963, 1966, 1967, 1970, 1971, 1973, 1974, 1979, 1981, 1999, 2000, 2014, 2015, 2023

Reserves Football

- ?

Thirds Football

- ?

== Netball Premierships ==
Upper Murray Football Netball League

A. Grade

- 1947,

B. Grade

- ?

c. Grade

- ?

D. Grade

- ?

14's & Under

- ?

15's & Under

- ?

11's & Under

- ?

== League Best and Fairest Winners ==
Upper Murray Football League

Seniors

- 1947, 1950, 1952 - Murray Jarvis
- 1954, 1955, 1956 - Les Harrison
- 1957 - B Bryant
- 1962 - Peter Chitty
- 1966 - Tony Smedley
- 1967 - Ian Moscrop
- 1971 - Noel Byatt
- 1973 - Ken Land
- 1977 - John Mulligan
- 1979 - Phil Byatt
- 1985 - Ian Edmondson
- 1988 - John Bloom &
- 1988 - Chris Graham
- 2009 - John Cleven
- 2024 - Grady Nigsch

Reserves

- ?

Thirds

- ?

== VFL / AFL Players ==
- 1936 - Peter Chitty - St Kilda
- 1937 - Bob Chitty - Carlton
- 1940 - Arthur Chitty - Carlton Reserves Later killed in 1942 during World War Two.

== See also ==
- Upper Murray Football Netball League
- Tallangatta & District Football League
- Australian rules football in Victoria
- Australian rules football in New South Wales
