= Murray Murrell =

Australian rules footballer

Personal information
- Full name: Francis Murray Murrell
- Born: 16 April 1923
- Died: 3 June 2016 (aged 93)
- Original team: East Coburg

Playing career^{1}
Years	Club	Games (Goals)
1945	Collingwood	2 (0)
- ^{1} Playing statistics correct to the end of 1945.

Francis Murray Murrell (16 April 1923 – 3 June 2016) was an Australian rules footballer who played with Collingwood in the Victorian Football League (VFL).

Murrell played reserves football with Collingwood in 1944, playing in Collingwood Reserves 1944 grand final loss to Fitzroy, prior to making his VFL debut against St Kilda at the Junction Oval in round seven, 1945.

Murrell played for the Bullioh Valley Football Club in the Tallangatta & District Football League in 1947 and 1948, winning the club best and fairest in 1948 and finishing third in the league best and fairest award.

Murrell won the 1949 Upper Murray Football League best and fairest award, whilst playing with Corryong.

Murrell was captain-coach of Corryong in 1950 when they lost the 1950 Upper Murray Football League grand final.
