= James Seaton =

James Seaton may refer to:

- James Seaton (professor) (1944–2017), professor of English at Michigan State University
- James Seaton (Newfoundland politician) (1804–1876), journalist and political figure in Newfoundland
- James Seaton (New Zealand politician) (1822–1882), member of parliament from Dunedin, New Zealand
- James Seaton (bishop) (1868–1938), Anglican bishop
- James Wilson Seaton (1824–1904), American lawyer and legislator
- Jimmy Seaton (1891–1959), Australian rules footballer

== See also ==
- James Seton (disambiguation)
