= Peter Chitty =

Australian rules footballer

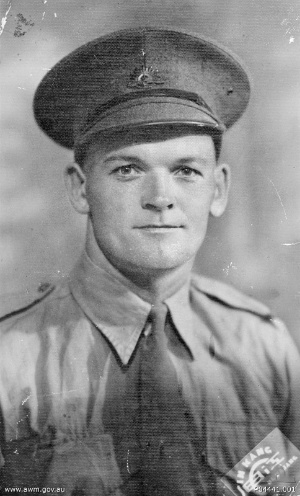

Personal information
- Full name: Leslie Allan Chitty
- Born: 11 March 1912; Corryong, Victoria
- Died: 27 March 1996 (aged 84)
- Original teams: Cudgewa (UMFL); Border United (OMFL)
- Debut: Round 11, 1936, St Kilda vs. Fitzroy, at Brunswick Street Oval
- Height: 170 cm (5 ft 7 in)
- Weight: 70 kg (154 lb)

Playing career^{1}
Years	Club	Games (Goals)
1936	St Kilda	2 (0)
- ^{1} Playing statistics correct to the end of 1936.

Career highlights
- "Brownlow Medal" in the Changi Football League, 1943

Leslie Allan "Peter" Chitty BEM (11 March 1912 – 27 March 1996) was an Australian rules footballer who played for St Kilda in the Victorian Football League (VFL). He was a prisoner of war held at Changi prison during the Second World War. Chitty won the only "Changi Brownlow" medal to be awarded as part of the Changi Australian rules football competition. In 2024, it was reported in the Corryong Courier that an Australian Red Ensign bearing the words "Changi '41 '42" and "Chitty flag" had been discovered, which may have flown over the game where Chitty was awarded the Changi Brownlow.

== Youth ==
Born in Corryong, Victoria, Chitty grew up on the family dairy farm near Corryong and, along with his brother Bob Chitty, became a leading footballer in the region for Cudgewa. Chitty continued to work on the family farm while playing as a rover in the Ovens and Murray Football League with the Border United Football Club, in Albury and played in the 1935 O&MFL Grand Final lost to Rutherglen Football Club, until St Kilda enticed him down to Melbourne for the 1936 VFL season.

== VFL career ==
Awarded guernsey number 36, Chitty made his VFL debut for St Kilda in Round 11, 1936, against Fitzroy at Brunswick Street Oval. After missing Round 12 with a leg injury, Chitty returned to St Kilda's league side for the Round 13 match against South Melbourne. Struck down by injuries, this was to be his last VFL match.

== World War II ==
Chitty returned to Corryong and was working on his farm when World War II was declared. On 25 July 1940, Chitty enlisted in the Second Australian Imperial Force and was posted to the 2/9 Field Ambulance Convoy, initially as a Private before gaining the rank of Corporal. One of four brothers to enlist, Chitty was sent to Singapore on 1 March 1941 and was stationed with the Australian General Hospital in Malaya when he was captured during the Fall of Singapore in March 1942 and reported missing on 26 March 1942 (although it was not until 9 June 1943 that his family were notified of his capture).

Chitty had three brothers, Arthur, Ronald, and Phillip, who also enlisted in the Army. All three served in the North Africa Campaign, Private Arthur Chitty with 2/23 Battalion and Ronald and Phillip with 2/2 Field Ambulance. Arthur was killed in action at El Alamein on 22 July 1942 while Privates Ronald and Phillip Chitty were taken prisoner by the Germans. They were repatriated in 1943 and visited their brother's grave in North Africa in September that year.

=== Changi Football League ===
Transported to Changi Prison's Selerang barracks, Chitty became involved in the Changi Football League, the Australian rules competition for Prisoners at Changi. Chitty played for "Geelong", one of four sides in the league (the others were "Essendon", "Collingwood" and "Carlton"). The League, with 15,000 Australian prisoners to choose from, was reportedly very strong and featured a number of players from leading leagues around the country.

At the end of the season, Chitty captained a side of players from Victoria against a team containing the best players from the rest of the country. The match, which drew 10,000 spectators, saw Chitty awarded the Changi Brownlow from former Brownlow Medallist Wilfred Smallhorn (who was too ill to play). The medal, reputedly made partly from metal from a downed Japanese aeroplane, became Chitty's good luck charm for the remainder of the war.

In 1943, Chitty was transferred to Burma where he spent eighteen months working on the Burma Railway. During this time, Chitty carried a fellow soldier who was dying of malaria more than 200 kilometres (120 mi) along the Railway, partly for which, on 6 March 1947, he was awarded the British Empire Medal.

After being repatriated at the end of World War II, Chitty was aboard the Largs Bay returning to Australia when the 1945 VFL Grand Final between South Melbourne and Carlton was being played. As Chitty's brother Bob was captaining Carlton, Chitty organised a syndicate and bet everything they had (which was beer) on a Carlton win. In an upset, Carlton defeated South Melbourne, and Chitty enjoyed his beers.

== Post-war ==
Chitty arrived back in Australia in October 1945. After two months recovering in hospital, Chitty was discharged on 5 December 1945.

Chitty died in 1996, aged 84, survived by his widow, Lillian, two sons, Lindsay and Roger and two daughters, Dawn and Roslyn. In 2004, Lillian Chitty presented Chitty's Changi Brownlow to the Australian War Memorial.
