= Tumbarumba Australian Football Netball Club =

Tumbarumba Roos

Names
- Full name: Tumbarumba Australian Football Netball Club
- Nickname: Roos

Club details
- Founded: 1896; 130 years ago
- Colours: blue white
- Competition: UMFNL
- Premierships: UMFNL: (3) 2012, 2013, 2022
- Ground: Tumbarumba Sports Ground

Uniforms
Home

Other information
- Official website: Tumbarumba FNC - Gameday website

The Tumbarumba Football Netball Club, nicknamed the Roos, is an Australian rules football and netball club which plays in the Upper Murray Football League. The club is based in New South Wales town of Tumbarumba and plays its home games at the Tumbarumba Recreation Reserve.

== History ==
The Tumbarumba Australian Rules Football Club was established in June 1896 and they played Corryong in their first match in August 1896.

In 1898, Tumbarumba FC wore a blue guernsey, with a white sash and played under Victorian Association rules.

The club played against other local teams between 1896 and 1899, then at the 1900 Annual Meeting, the club decided to play Rugby instead of "Association" football.

The Tumbarumba Football Club was then reformed in 1969 and commenced playing Australian Rules Football in the Upper Murray Football League in 1971 and it took until the last round of the 1974 season on Saturday 14th August for Tumbarumba: 10.5 - 65 to record its first senior football win when it beat Corryong: 8.6 - 54.

The club is based in a Rugby League dominated town and has struggled for success on-field since its formation. Senior success has been scarce for the Kangaroos; however, they have won numerous reserve flags whilst their junior sides have been the most successful of any club in the past decade.

The club's senior football team has been runners up in 1980, and 1998, 2008 and 2026, before winning back-to-back premierships in 2012, 2013 and 2022.

== Premierships ==
Upper Murray Football League

Senior Football

- 2012 - Tumbarumba: 13.11 - 89 d Cudgewa: 12.4 - 76
- 2013 - Tumbarumba: 15.12 - 102 d Bullioh: 10.9 - 69
- 2022 - Tumbarumba: 13.11 - 89 d Cudgewa: 8.5 - 53

Reserves Football

- 2013 - Tumbarumba: 8.5 - 53 d Corryong: 6.11 - 47

Thirds Football - Under 16's

- 2009 - Tumbarumba: 8.6 - 54 d Cudgewa: 3.3 - 21
- 2010 - Tumbarumba: 8.5 - 53 d Cudgewa: 2.3 - 15
- 2013 - Tumbarumba: 6.10 - 46 d Federal: 3.7 - 25
- 2016 - Tumbarumba: 11.6 - 72 d Federal: 0.4 - 4

== League Best and Fairest ==
Seniors

== VFL Players ==
- 1981 - Dennis Carroll: South Melbourne/Sydney
