= Charlie Greenhill =

Australian rules footballer, born 1902

Personal information
- Full name: Charles Dickson Greenhill
- Born: 23 March 1902; Corryong, Victoria
- Died: 14 August 1986 (aged 84); Macleod, Victoria
- Original team: Corryong
- Height: 183 cm (6 ft 0 in)
- Weight: 84 kg (185 lb)

Playing career^{1}
Years	Club	Games (Goals)
1922	Carlton	3 (0)
- ^{1} Playing statistics correct to the end of 1922.

Charles Dickson Greenhill (23 March 1902 – 14 August 1986) was an Australian rules footballer who played with Carlton in the Victorian Football League (VFL).

Greenhill played in the Carlton senior side in rounds four, six and seven in 1922, then played the second half of the 1922 football season with Brunswick in the VFA.

Greenhill returned to Corryong in 1923 and won the 1923 best all-round player award in the Upper Murray Football Association.

Greenhill then played in Corryong's 1923 and 1924 Upper Murray Football Association premierships.

Younger brother of Carlton's Jack Greenhill.
