= Bob Chitty =

Australian rules footballer

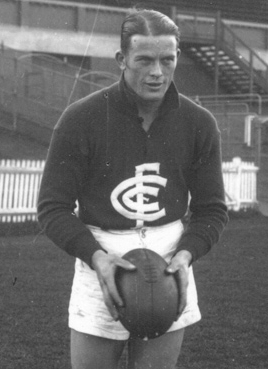

Personal information
- Full name: Robert Mainwaring Chitty
- Born: 4 July 1916; Corryong, Victoria
- Died: 4 April 1985 (aged 68); Launceston, Tasmania
- Original teams: Cudgewa (UMFL); Sunshine VSDL
- Height: 174 cm (5 ft 9 in)
- Weight: 86 kg (190 lb)

Playing career^{1}
Years	Club	Games (Goals)
1937–1946	Carlton	147 (32)
- ^{1} Playing statistics correct to the end of 1946.

Career highlights
- Carlton premiership player 1938; Carlton premiership captain 1945; Robert Reynolds Trophy 1941, 1944; Carlton captain 1945–1946

Robert Mainwaring Chitty (4 July 1916 – 4 April 1985) was an Australian rules footballer in the Victorian Football League (VFL).

== Family ==
The son of Alan Peter Chitty (1884-1981), and Hannah Evelyne Chitty (1887-1974), née Wilson, Robert Mainwaring "Bob" Chitty was born at Corryong, Victoria on 4 July 1916.

He married Hazel Irene Leggo (1907-1976) on 26 April 1941.

Chitty's brother Peter played VFL football for St Kilda. Later, as a prisoner of War in Changi Prison, Peter was awarded a "Brownlow Medal" for being the Best and Fairest player in the Changi Football League.

== Football ==
Chitty played much of his junior and amateur football for his home town of Cudgewa.

Leaving the country for the city, Chitty played for Sunshine in the Victorian Sub-Districts before being signed by Carlton. Chitty made his debut for the Carlton Football Club in Round 7 of the 1937 season. While a brilliant, versatile player, Chitty built his reputation as one of the game's most fearsome hardmen:

"Some players manufacture aggression, others seem born to it; as far as Bob Chitty was concerned, aggression oozed out of his every pore." — australianfootball.com.

Chitty captained Carlton to victory in the infamous 1945 "Bloodbath" Grand Final. Chitty's king hit of South Melbourne's Ron Clegg in the second quarter is seen as what triggered the succession of violent incidents that garnered the match its nickname. In the fourth quarter, Chitty was knocked out by opponent Laurie Nash. After the match, Chitty was suspended for eight weeks for elbowing Bill Williams.

After leaving Carlton at the end of the 1946 VFL season, Chitty spent several years in country Victoria as captain-coach of the Benalla Football Club in the Ovens and Murray Football League from 1947 to 1949, during which time he led the goalkicking on two occasions.

Chitty then moved to Tasmania in 1950, where he served as captain-coach of the Scottsdale Football Club. He won the Northern Tasmanian Football Association goalkicking in 1952 with 40 goals. He finished his playing career with Ringarooma in the North East Football Union; and, in 1956, he kicked 105 goals for the season.

== Actor ==
In 1947, while he was living in Benalla, Chitty ("a good horseman and bushman") starred as bushranger Ned Kelly in the critically panned feature film, The Glenrowan Affair, that was released in 1951.

== Death ==
He died at Launceston, Tasmania on 4 April 1985.
