= James Seton =

James Seton may refer to:

- Sir James Seton (died 1606), commissioner to the Parliament of Scotland in 1593 and 1596, represented Dumbartonshire (UK Parliament constituency)
- James Seton (died 1673), commissioner for Stirlingshire between 1665 and 1672
- James Seton (died 1702), commissioner for Stirlingshire between 1673 and 1686
- James Seton, 4th Earl of Dunfermline (died 1694), Scottish peer
- James Alexander Seton (1816–1845), last British person to be killed in a duel on English soil

== See also ==
- James Seaton (disambiguation)
