= Bullioh Football Netball Club =

Australian rules football club

Bullioh Bulldogs

Names
- Full name: Bullioh Football Netball Club
- Nickname: Bulldogs

Club details
- Founded: 1928; 98 years ago as "Bullioh FC"
- Colours: red white red
- Competition: Upper Murray
- Premierships: TDFL:1; 1950. UMFNL: (9); 2004, 2008, 2009, 2010, 2011, 2018, 2019, 2024, 2025
- Ground: Whyeebo Recreation Reserve

Uniforms
Home

Bullioh Football Netball Club, nicknamed the Bulldogs, is an Australian rules football club which plays in the Upper Murray Football League. The club is based in Victorian district of Bullioh and plays its home games 13 km away at Wyeebo Recreation Reserve in the Victoria district of Tallangatta.

== History ==
Bullioh FC

The Bullioh Football Club was established in 1928. (wore yellow and black colours & were known as the Carnaries)

Leagues Timeline

- 1928: Yackandandah & District Football Association.
- 1929 - 1930: club in recess
- 1931: Tallangatta & District Football Association (green & gold colours)
- 1932 - 1946: club in recess.

Tallangatta Valley FC

The Tallangatta Valley Football Club was established in 1909 (wore gold and black colours)

Leagues Timeline

- 1909 - 1913: "Mitta Valley Football Association"
- 1914: "Wodonga & District Football Association" (1914 - as "Federal Railway FC");
- 1921: "Kiewa & District Football Association"
- 1934: "Tallangatta & District Football Association"

Premiers

- Mitta Valley Football Association
  - 1909, 1911, 1913,
- Tallangatta FC Knockout Competition
  - 1948 - Bullioh: 8.4 - 52 d Albury: 3.9 - 27

=== Bullioh Valley Football Club (1947-1977) ===
The Bullioh Valley Football Club (as it was then known) was originally formed in 1947 as a result of a merger between the Tallangatta Valley and Bullioh football teams after WWII. The newly merged club participated in the Tallangatta & District Football League from 1947 until 1977.

The club won its only Senior TDFL flag in 1950 when Bullioh Valley defeated Granya by one point. The club changed its colours to red, white and blue in 1964.

Despite the Bulldogs being Runners Up in 1976 it was apparent by the end of 1977 that both the Bullioh and nearby Tallangatta Football Club's would both struggle for survival unless steps were taken to remedy the situation. A merger between the two club's paved the way for the Tallangatta Valley Football Club to debut in the TDFL in 1978 with home games being shared between the two former clubs. The merged club was immediately successful winning flags in 1979 and 1980. However, by the early 1990s all home games were played at the Tallangatta football ground.

- Tallangatta & District Football League: Grand Finals

Year	G	B	Pts	Premiers	G	B	Pts	Runners-Up	Ground
1949	8	8	56	Tallangatta	7	6	48	Bullioh Valley	Rowan Park
1950	9	9	63	Bullioh Valley	9	8	62	Granya	Sandy Creek Oval
1952	6	15	51	Mitta United	2	7	19	Bullioh Valley	Sandy Creek Oval
1972	17	13	115	Kiewa-Sandy Creek	11	8	74	Bullioh Valley	Sandy Creek Oval
1976	20	16	136	Kiewa-Sandy Creek	12	9	81	Bullioh Valley	Sandy Creek Oval

- In 2009 the "Tallangatta Valley FNC" were renamed to the "Tallangatta FNC" no longer recognizing their connection to the "Bullioh Valley FC" after almost 10 years since the re-formation of the "Bullioh FNC".

=== Upper Murray Football Netball League ===
By 2000 a group of residents of the Bullioh community had decided it was time to reform the Bullioh Football Club. Although both the Tallangatta Valley and Cudgewa clubs protested their players would be poached and after it was initially turned down by the VCFL the club was granted the right to play in the Upper Murray Football League in 2001. That season they fielded senior, reserve and junior sides along with the formation of the Bullioh Netball Club. The senior side managed four victories in their inaugural season.

Since first taking to the field in the Upper Murray Football League, Bullioh has been among the most successful clubs in country Victoria, making the finals in all but its first season and winning their maiden Upper Murray flag in 2004. Since the appointment of Mark Nichol as senior coach in 2007 the club has made 5 grand finals in a row. After finishing the home and away season in 2007 with only one loss the Bulldog's were shock losers to Federal in a near unbackable grand final.

However, this only strengthened the club's resolve with the club now having won four premierships in succession (2008–2011).

== Football Premierships ==
Upper Murray Football League

Senior Football (9)

- 2004, 2008, 2009, 2010, 2011, 2018, 2019, 2024, 2025

Reserves Football

- ?

Thirds Football

- ?

== Netball Premierships ==
Upper Murray Football Netball League

A. Grade

- ?

B. Grade

- 2017,

C. Grade

- 2018, 2019, 2022, 2023,

D. Grade

- 2022, 2023,

14's & Under

- 2018

15's & Under

- ?

11's & Under

- ?

== See also ==
- Australian rules football in Victoria
- Australian rules football in New South Wales
- Yackandandah & District Football League
