= Corryong Football Netball Club =

Australian rules football and netball club

Corryong FNC

Names
- Full name: Corryong Football Netball Club
- Nickname: Demons

Club details
- Founded: 1892; 133 years ago
- Colours: dark blue claret
- Competition: UMFNL
- Premierships: UMFNL: 32; 1893, 1894, 1899, 1903, 1905, 1907, 1908, 1909, 1910, 1912, 1915, 1923, 1924, 1926, 1927, 1928, 1930, 1932, 1951, 1964, 1968, 1969, 1972, 1978, 1985, 1987, 1995, 2001, 2002, 2003, 2005, 2017
- Ground: Corryong Recreation Reserve

Uniforms
Home

Other information
- Official website: Corryong FNC

The Corryong Football Netball Club is an Australian rules football and netball club that plays in the Upper Murray Football League. The club fields all senior and junior sides alongside the Corryong Netball Club. Their players are mainly from the Corryong area and also from Albury/Wodonga.

== History ==
Corryong was a founding member in 1893 of the Corryong Football Association, a precursor of today's Upper Murray Football League, and with a total of thirty-one senior grade premierships to its credit the club is the most successful in the competition's history. That success commenced right away as Corryong won successive flags in 1893 and 1894 and by the time the competition went into recess in 1916 because of World War One it had added another nine, including four in succession between 1907 and 1910.

During the 1920s Corryong was an almost perennial grand finalist, emerging triumphant on five occasions. It was less successful during the 1930s but still managed to claim a couple of flags. Following the second world war the club was consistently in the hunt for premiership honours and between 1948 and 1954 contested every grand final except one. However, it was successful only once, against Federal in 1951. It was a similar story during the late 1950s and the first half of the ensuing decade as, over the course of eight seasons, the Demons managed just a solitary grand final victory from half a dozen attempts.

Corryong ended the 1960s in style, however, overcoming Federal in the grand final of 1968 by 29 points and Cudgewa in the following season's play-off by a bare 2 point margin. Since their 1969 triumph the Demons have continued to amass flags at a steady rate.

== 2000 and Beyond ==
The Demons were the powerhouse club of the competition during the first half of the decade. Between 2000 and 2005 Corryong's seniors won premierships in 2001, 2002, 2003 and 2005. These sides were made up of a strong local talent base combined with some experienced players from stronger district leagues proving the difference between themselves and the rest of the competition. The club also made grand finals in 2006 and 2008 with their last appearance in a grand final resulting in an embarrassing 108-point loss to Bullioh. A combination of the club's older players retiring and a number of locals leaving the area has resulted in the Demon's struggling down the bottom of the ladder for the last three season's with them finishing winless in 2011. Corryong Demons made another appearance against Cudgewa in the 2014 Grand Final, but unfortunately loss. In 2016 there was a three point loss in the Grand Final to rival Federal. However in 2017, Demons came home with the flag smashing Bullioh.

Since 2017, the senior football sides have really struggled and the club is also struggling with volunteer involvement too.

== Football Premierships ==
Senior Football (32)

- Corryong Football Association (1893–1899)
  - 1893, 1894, 1899
- Upper Murray Football Club Association (1900–1901)
  - Nil
- Upper Murray Football Association (1902–1903)
  - 1903
- Corryong District Association (1904–1906)
  - 1905
- Upper Murray Football Association (1907–1936)
  - 1907, 1908, 1909, 1910, 1912, 1915, 1923, 1924, 1926, 1927, 1928, 1930, 1932
- Upper Murray Football League (1937-2000)
  - 1951, 1964, 1968, 1969, 1972, 1978, 1985, 1987, 1995
- Upper Murray Football Netball League (2001–present)
  - 2001, 2002, 2003, 2005, 2017

Reserves Football

- ?

Thirds Football

- ?

== League Best and Fairest Winners ==
Senior Football

- 1949 - Murray Murrell
- 1964 - Noel Richardson
- 1972 - John Merrick
- 1975 - Tony Buscombe
- 1984 - David Greenhill
- 1987 - Stephen Brown
- 1993 - Brendan Attree
- 2000 - Alby Freijah
- 2001 - Michael Wild
- 2006, 2012, 2013 - Evan Nicholas
- 2014 - Shannon Gilson

== League leading goalkickers ==
Senior Football

- 1951 - Larry Harris: 103 goals
- 1952 - Larry Harris: 51
- 1953 - Larry Harris: 108
- 1954 - Larry Harris: 59
- 1955 - Bill Moon: 58
- 1958 - John Hadley: 52
- 1960 - Cliff Daly: 64
- 1962 - Glen Whitehead: 62
- 1963 - Ian Todd: 82
- 1964 - Ian Todd: 75
- 1973 - Chris McInnes: 43
- 1978 - Chris McInnes: 115
- 1980 - Chris McInnes: 90
- 1985 - Brett Richter: 72
- 1988 - Rod Lees: 119
- 2002 - Ross Hilliary: 100
- 2017 - Jarrod Williams: 108

== Netball Premierships ==
The Corryong Basketball Club was formed in 1946 and played in the Upper Murray Basketball (Netball) Association from 1946 to 1970, when the sport of women's basketball name was changed to "netball" in Australia in 1970.

Upper Murray Football Netball League

A. Grade

- 1950,

B. Grade

- ?

C. Grade

- 2015, 2024,

D. Grade

- ?

14's & Under

- ?

15's & Under

- 2017

11's & Under

- ?

== VFL / AFL Players ==
The following footballers played with Corryong, prior to playing senior football in the VFL/AFL, and / or drafted, with the year indicating their VFL/AFL debut.

- 1912 - Jimmy Seaton - Collingwood
- 1917 - Jack Greenhill - Carlton
- 1922 - Charlie Greenhill - Carlton
- 1922 - Eric Humphrey - Carlton
- 1968 - Barry Mugeli - Collingwood

== See also ==
- Upper Murray Football Netball League
- Tallangatta & District Football League
- Australian rules football in Victoria
- Australian rules football in New South Wales
