= Sandy Creek, Victoria =

Sandy Creek
- Town
- Coordinates: 36°21′43″S 147°7′16″E
- Country: Australia
- State: Victoria
- Region: Hume
- LGA: Shire of Indigo

Government
  - State electorate: Benambra
  - Federal division: Indi

Population
  - Total: 200 (2021 census)
- Postcode: 3695

Sandy Creek is a locality in the Shire of Indigo, Victoria, Australia. At the 2021 census, Sandy Creek had a population of 200.

== History ==
The Mitta Mitta River and several of its tributaries were the scene of gold discoveries in the early 1850s, and gold was found at Sandy Creek in 1854. Reports from the time described diggings extending about 5 km along the creek, worked by around 300 miners, with some reef gold also present. An Anglican school opened in 1859. Unlike most gold towns in Victoria, Sandy Creek had no hotel, little to no agriculture, and only a post office and a school as public institutions. Gold and tin dredging operated from about 1900 until 1918. The school closed in 1921 and reopened in 1942 in the local hall, before closing permanently in 1953 when Kiewa Valley Consolidated School was built. The Sandy Creek Upper school, established in 1890, had 27 pupils in 1999 and 5 in 2014.
