= Barry Mugeli =

Australian rules footballer

Personal information
- Full name: Barry Mugeli
- Born: 19 March 1948 (age 78)
- Original team: Corryong

Playing career^{1}
Years	Club	Games (Goals)
1968	Collingwood	3 (0)
- ^{1} Playing statistics correct to the end of 1968.

Barry Mugeli (born 19 March 1948) is a former Australian rules footballer who played for the Collingwood Football Club in the Victorian Football League (VFL).
