= Eric Humphrey =

Australian rules footballer

Personal information
- Full name: Cyril Eric George Humphrey
- Born: 20 November 1900; Cudgewa, Victoria
- Died: 16 April 1929 (aged 28); Corryong, Victoria
- Original team: Corryong
- Height: 180 cm (5 ft 11 in)
- Weight: 80 kg (176 lb)

Playing career^{1}
Years	Club	Games (Goals)
1922	Carlton	4 (1)
- ^{1} Playing statistics correct to the end of 1922.

Cyril Eric George Humphrey (20 November 1900 – 16 April 1929) was an Australian rules footballer who played with Carlton in the Victorian Football League (VFL).
