= AFL North East Border Female Football League =

Australian rules football competition

- Formerly: AFL North East Border Youth Girls
- Association: AFL Victoria Country
- Sport: Women's Australian rules football
- Founded: 2015

The Australian Football League North East Border Female Football League (AFL NEB FFL) is a Women's Australian rules football competition based in the greater North East Victoria region of Victoria, Australia.

== History ==
The league was established in 2015 as a pathway for young girls who wanted to continue playing football after Auskick but were unable to compete in traditional male leagues across the region. Since its inception the league has grown to seven clubs and two competitions, one for women aged 13 to 16, and a second open-age competition for women aged 17 years and over.

== Clubs ==
=== Senior Clubs ===
Club	Colors	Nickname	Home Ground	Former League	Est.	NEBFFL Seasons	NEBFFL Senior Premierships	
Club	Colors	Nickname	Home Ground	Former League	Est.	NEBFFL Seasons	Total	Seasons
Lavington		Panthers	Lavington Sports Ground, Hamilton Valley	–	1880s	2015-	4	2022, 2023, 2024, 2025
Corowa-Rutherglen		Kangaroos	John Foord Oval, Corowa	–	1979	2025-	0	-
Thurgoona		Bulldogs	Thurgoona Oval, Thurgoona	–	1988	2017-2020, 2022-	2	2018, 2019
Wangaratta Rovers		Hawks	W.J. Findlay Oval, Wangaratta	–	1922	2018-	0	-
Wodonga Raiders		Raiders	Birallee Park, Wodonga	–	1975	2015-	0	-

=== Junior-only clubs ===
Club	Colours	Nickname	Home Ground	Former League	Est.	NEBFFL Seasons
North Albury		Hoppers	Bunton Park, North Albury	–	1943	2024-
Wodonga		Bulldogs	Martin Park, Wodonga	–	1878	2021-

=== Former clubs ===
Club	Colors	Nickname	Home Ground	Former League	Est.	NEBFFL Seasons	NEBFFL Senior Premierships		Fate
Club	Colors	Nickname	Home Ground	Former League	Est.	NEBFFL Seasons	Total	Seasons	Fate
Alpine Lions		Lions	Whorouly Recreation Reserve, Whorouly	–	2016	2016-2020	0	-	Merged with Thurgoona and Yarrawonga to play as United in 2021, folded before 2022 season
Murray Felines		Felines	Barkly Park, Rutherglen	–	2016	2016-2024	0	-	Merged with Corowa-Rutherglen following 2024 season
United		Lions, Bulldogs, Pigeons	Whorouly Recreation Reserve, Whorouly and J.C. Lowe Oval, Yarrawonga	–	2021	2021	0	-	Folded after 2022 season. Only Thurgoona re-formed.
Yarrawonga		Pigeons	J.C. Lowe Oval, Yarrawonga	–	1889	2017-2019	0	-	In recess since 2019. Played merged with Thurgoona and Alpine Lions as United in 2021

== Premiers ==
Year	Seniors	Youth Girls		
2015	No competition	Lavington		
2016	No competition	Lavington		
2017	No competition	Wodonga Raiders		
2018	Thurgoona	Murray Felines		
2019	Thurgoona	Lavington		
2020	No competition due to COVID-19 pandemic			
2021	Competition abandoned due to COVID-19 pandemic			
Year	Seniors	U17	U14	U12
2022	Lavington	Lavington	Lavington	No competition
2023	Lavington	Lavington	Lavington	No competition
2024	Lavington	Lavington	Lavington	No competition
2025	Lavington	Wodonga Raiders	Wodonga	Lavington

== Seasons ==
=== 2015 ===
- Australian Football League North East Border Youth Girls
  - Grand Final: Lavington def. Wodonga Raiders

=== 2016 ===
- Australian Football League North East Border Youth Girls

Ladder	Wins	Losses	Draws	Byes	For	Against	%	Pts
Lavington	8	1	0	0	593	131	452.67%	32
Wodonga Raiders	5	4	0	0	422	337	125.22%	20
Alpine Lions	5	4	0	0	445	380	117.11%	20
Murray Felines	0	9	0	0	68	680	10.00%	0

Finals	Team	G	B	Pts	Team	G	B	Pts
1st Semi	Alpine Lions	15	12	102	Murray Felines	0	0	0
2nd Semi	Lavington	6	6	42	Wodonga Raiders	4	6	30
Preliminary	Wodonga Raiders	3	6	24	Alpine Lions	2	9	21
Grand	Lavington	9	11	65	Wodonga Raiders	3	6	24

== 2021 Ladder ==
North East Women's	Wins	Byes	Losses	Draws	For	Against	%	Pts	Final	Team	G	B	Pts	Team	G	B	Pts
Wodonga Raiders	10	0	0	0	489	100	489.00%	40	1st Semi	Wangaratta Rovers	12	6	78	Murray Felines	1	2	8
Lavington	6	0	3	0	389	155	250.97%	24	2nd Semi	Lavington	4	9	33	Wodonga Raiders	3	5	23
Wangaratta Rovers	4	0	4	0	228	241	94.61%	16	Preliminary	Wodonga Raiders	10	6	66	Wangaratta Rovers	0	4	4
Murray Felines	1	0	7	0	40	353	11.33%	4	Grand	0	0	0	0	0	0	0	0
Alpine Lions	1	0	8	0	64	361	17.73%	4		Grand final cancelled due to Government lockdown							

== 2022 Ladder ==
North East Womens	Wins	Byes	Losses	Draws	For	Against	%	Pts	Final	Team	G	B	Pts	Team	G	B	Pts
Wodonga Raiders	10	0	2	0	742	96	772.92%	40	1st Semi	Wangaratta Rovers	5	8	38	Murray Felines	1	1	7
Lavington	10	0	2	0	778	122	637.70%	40	2nd Semi	Wodonga Raiders	1	3	9	Lavington	0	2	2
Wangaratta Rovers	6	0	6	0	372	509	73.08%	24	Preliminary	Lavington	6	6	42	Wangaratta Rovers	1	3	9
Murray Felines	4	0	8	0	246	451	54.55%	16	Grand	Lavington	2	4	16	Wodonga Raiders	1	1	7
Thurgoona	0	0	12	0	87	1047	8.31%	0									
