= Jack Greenhill =

Australian rules footballer

Personal information
- Full name: John Dickson Greenhill
- Born: 23 June 1897; Corryong, Victoria
- Died: 2 July 1977 (aged 80); Corryong, Victoria
- Original team: Corryong
- Height: 180 cm (5 ft 11 in)
- Weight: 80 kg (176 lb)

Playing career^{1}
Years	Club	Games (Goals)
1917, 1920–23	Carlton	41 (4)
- ^{1} Playing statistics correct to the end of 1923.

John Dickson Greenhill (23 June 1897 – 2 July 1977) was an Australian rules football player who served with the Australian Imperial Force during World War I.

== Playing career ==
Having arrived from Corryong via the Maribyrnong artillery camp after enlisting in the army, Greenhill made his debut for Carlton in the Victorian Football League during the 1917 season in round two against Collingwood and figured in their best players in several different newspaper match reviews.

After a break due to military service, he rejoined the club for the 1920 VFL season playing 13 games in a Carlton team that made it to the Preliminary Final. The following year he played 19 matches, playing in the Blues team that lost the 1921 VFL Grand Final to Richmond.

He also represented Victoria at the 1921 Perth Carnival.

His brother Charlie Greenhill was also an Australian rules footballer with Carlton in 1922.

== Military service ==
Greenhill enlisted with the Australian Imperial Force in April 1917 and left Melbourne on HMAT Port Sydney in November 1917. He was attached to the 8th Field Artillery Brigade as a gunner. He returned to Australia in July 1919.
