= Jimmy Seaton =

Australian rules footballer

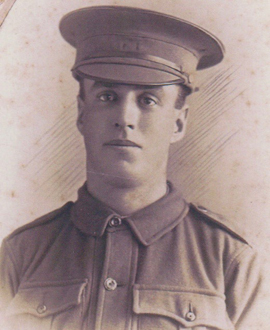

Personal information
- Full name: James Seaton
- Born: 25 May 1891; Corryong, Victoria
- Died: 3 January 1959 (aged 67); Fitzroy, Victoria
- Original team: Corryong
- Height: 173 cm (5 ft 8 in)
- Weight: 72 kg (159 lb)

Playing career^{1}
| Years | Club | Games (Goals) |
| 1912 | Collingwood | 1 (2) |
- ^{1} Playing statistics correct to the end of 1912.

Jimmy Seaton (25 May 1891 – 3 January 1959) was an Australian rules footballer who played with Collingwood in the Victorian Football League (VFL).

Seaton came down from Corryong to play the last match of the 1912 season and Collingwood were expecting him to return in 1914 after the harvest preparation was completed.

Seaton was secretary of the Corryong Football Club in 1911 and 1912 and later served as President of the Corryong Football Club in 1924.

Seaton enlisted with the Australian Imperial Force in 1916.
