= Corryong Courier =

Australian newspaper

The Corryong Courier is a newspaper published in Corryong, Victoria, Australia.

== History ==
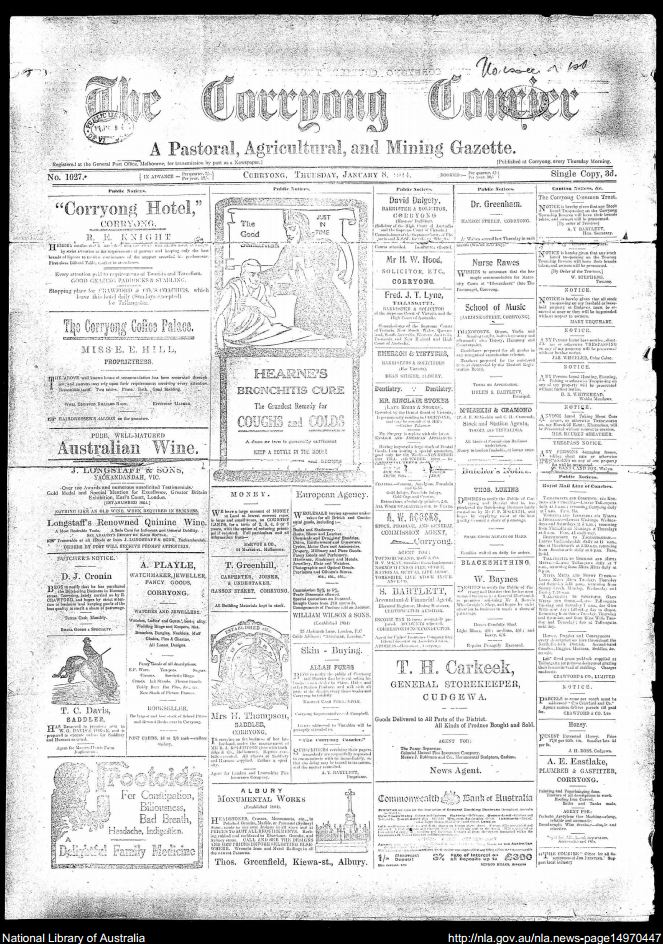
Front page of Corryong Courier, 8 January 1914

The paper was first published on 25 January 1894. H.H Parnaby & A. Albert were the original owners, followed by Peter Seaton and then T.E Jeans & W.G Jeans. In 1937 William McClure took over and in 1951, his son Col took over before handing it over to his daughter Cyndie and husband Mark Collins in 1993. From 2012, Jade Moscrop and Liam Collins purchased the business and continue to publish the newspaper each week.

Between 1946 and 1960 the Corryong Courier was renamed the Corryong courier and Walwa district news.

At the end of 1992, it was the only newspaper in Victoria still using the "hot metal" and flat-bed press method of production, this changed in 1993 when the new owners brought in computers to maintain a similar format but using modern methods.

== Digitisation ==
The newspaper has been digitised as part of the Australian Newspapers Digitisation Program project of the National Library of Australia. It was digitised in June 2011, in the first collaboration between the Digitisation and Photography Branch of the National Library of Australia and the Australian Newspapers Digitisation Program team.

== See also ==
List of newspapers in Australia
