= Australian rules football in Victoria =

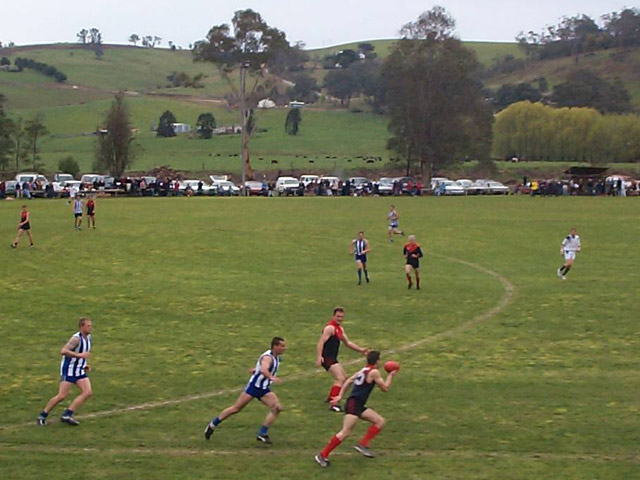
- The grand final of the Omeo & District Football League in 2001
- Governing body: AFL Victoria
- Representative team: Victoria
- First played: Melbourne 31 July 1858; 168 years ago
- Registered players: 227,213 (adult); 96,068 (child)
- Clubs: 1,242 (76 competitions)

Club competitions
- Victorian Football League; Victorian Amateur Football Association; Eastern Football League; Northern Football Netball League; Essendon District Football League; Southern Football Netball League; Western Region Football League; Geelong Football League; Ballarat Football League; Bendigo Football League; Ovens & Murray Football League; Goulburn Valley Football League

Audience records
- Single match: 121,696 (1970: Collingwood vs Carlton, Melbourne Cricket Ground)

In Victoria, Australian rules football (known mainly as "football" or "footy") is the most popular sport overall, being the most watched and second most participated code of football. Australian rules football originated in Melbourne in the late 1850s and quickly came to dominate in the sport, which it continues to. Victoria has more than double the number of players of any other state in Australia accounting for approximately 42% of all Australian players in 2023 and continues to grow strongly. In 2023 there were 76 competitions and 1,242 clubs. According to Ausplay there are 227,213 adult players of which about one in three are female and 96,068 children playing, similar numbers to soccer. The sport is governed by AFL Victoria based in Melbourne. The national governing body, the AFL Commission is also based in Melbourne.

The national Australian Football League (AFL) grew out of the Victorian Football League, founded in 1896, as it expanded nationally in the 1980s. 10 of 18 AFL clubs remain Victoria-based including the 4 oldest and the most successful with two thirds of all premierships. Victoria is home to the Cordner–Eggleston Cup, first contested in 1858 and the longest continuously running football competition in the world. It is home to the oldest club in the sport, the Melbourne Football Club which wrote the first rules in 1859 also is the oldest professional football club of any code in the world. It was home to the first official tournament in the sport, the Challenge Cup in 1861. It is home to the second oldest football league in Australia, the semi-professional Victorian Football Association founded in 1877 which, like the AFL has also begun to expand nationally. While Victoria in 2017 accounted for just 30% of all players worldwide, and 40% of Australian players, more than 60% of professional AFL players are recruited from the state. Proponents of the game from outside the state have widely criticised the Victorian bias which runs through many aspects of the game nationally.

The Melbourne Cricket Ground, with a capacity of 100,024 people, is considered the "spiritual home" of the game, and is contracted to host the sport's largest event, the AFL Grand Final, annually until 2058. This event is traditionally staged on the afternoon of the last Saturday in September. The state also holds regular blockbusters including the annual Anzac Day match, King's Birthday match and Dreamtime at the 'G.

The Victoria Australian rules football team debuted in 1879 and has been dominant in national championships winning more titles than any other state (until the introduction of State of Origin rules) with 16 of the 19 carnivals up until 1975. Since the 1999 Victoria has been undefeated, having won the AFL Hall of Fame Tribute Match, State of Origin for Bushfire Relief Match and 2026 AFL Origin. Victorian teams have also dominated the National underage championships with two thirds of the titles since it went national in 1976. Victorian clubs have also won 10 of the 19 Championships of Australia.

Victoria has produced the most greats in the history of the game. All four of the Sport Australia Hall of Fame Australian Football legends are Victorian: Ron Barassi, Ted Whitten, Bob Skilton and Leigh Matthews. In 2024 the vast majority of the Australian Football Hall of Fame Legends are also from the state (20 of 31). Victoria also holds the world record for attendance with 121,696 attending the 1970 VFL Grand Final between Carlton and Collingwood.

== History ==
See also Origins of the Game, History of Australian rules football in Victoria (1859–1900)

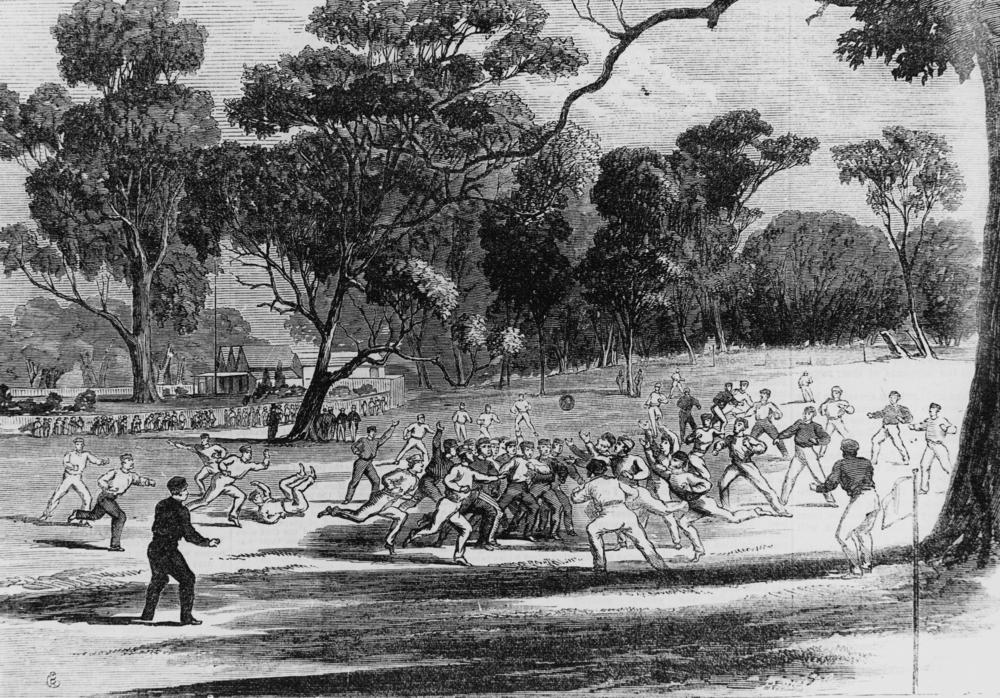
A game at the Richmond Paddock in the 1860s. A pavilion at the MCG is on the left in the background. (A wood engraving made by Robert Bruce on 27 July 1866)

In 1858 Tom Wills began to devise Australian rules in Melbourne, the capital of Victoria, which was at the time a British colony. (Although H.C.A. Harrison, Wills' cousin, was also named, much later, as an official father of the game his role does not, now, seem to have been significant at this very early stage.) A letter by Wills was published in Bell's Life in Victoria & Sporting Chronicle on 10 July 1858, calling for a "foot-ball club" with a "code of laws" to keep cricketers fit during winter. A match, played at the Richmond Paddock (later known as Yarra Park next to the MCG) on 31 July 1858, was probably a game of folk football, or one based on unidentified English school rules. However, few details of the match have survived.

The Melbourne Football Club was founded on Saturday 14 May 1859, one of the world's first football clubs in any code. For many years unjustified claims have been made about a football match between Melbourne Grammar School and Scotch College. It began on 7 August 1858, umpired by Wills and John McAdam. A second day of play took place on 21 August and a third, and final, day on 4 September. The two schools have competed annually ever since. However, the rules used by the two teams in 1858 had little in common with the eventual form of Australian football since that code had not yet been written.

The Melbourne Football Club rules of 1859 are the oldest surviving set of laws for Australian football. They were drawn up at the Parade Hotel, East Melbourne, on 17 May, by Wills, W. J. Hammersley, J. B. Thompson and Thomas Smith (some sources include H. C. A. Harrison). The 1859 rules did not include some elements that soon became important to the game, such as the requirement to bounce the ball while running, and Melbourne's game was not immediately adopted by neighbouring clubs. Before each match the rules had to be agreed by the two teams involved. By 1866, however, several other clubs had agreed to play by an updated version of Melbourne's rules.

=== First Organised Competitions ===
While many early Victorian teams participated in one-off matches, most had not yet formed clubs for regular competition until 1860. To ensure the supremacy of the Melbourne rules, the first-club level competition in Australia, the Caledonian Society's Challenge Cup (1861–64), stipulated that only the Melbourne rules were to be used. This law was reinforced by the Athletic Sports Committee (ASC), which ran a variation of the Challenge Cup in 1865–66. With input from other clubs, the rules underwent several minor revisions, establishing a uniform code known as "Victorian rules". In 1866, the "first distinctively Victorian rule", the running bounce, was formalised at a meeting of club delegates chaired by H. C. A. Harrison, an influential pioneer who took up football in 1859 at the invitation of Wills, his cousin.

=== VFA era ===
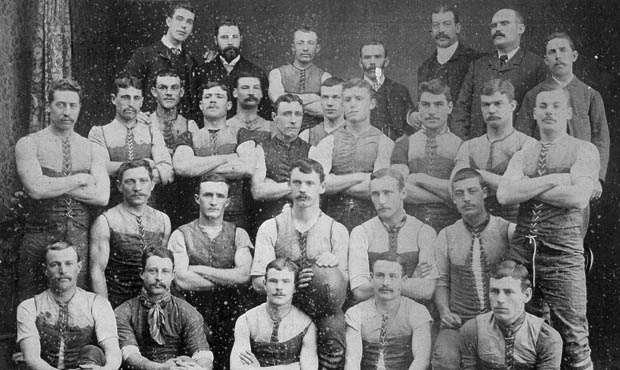
Carlton, VFA first premiers in 1877

On 17 May 1877, the Victorian Football Association (VFA), Victoria's first governing body for Australian football, was formed. The foundation Senior clubs of the VFA were Albert-park, Carlton, Hotham, Melbourne, St Kilda. The Junior section of the VFA originally included such clubs as Ballarat, East Melbourne, Essendon, Hawthorn, Northcote, South Melbourne, Standard, Victoria United, Victorian Railways, West Melbourne and Williamstown. During its early years, many clubs dropped in and out and there were erratic promotions between the Senior and Junior sections. Hawthorn, Northcote, Standard, Victoria United, Victorian Railways and Williamstown dropped out within a year or so but Hawthorn, Northcote and Williamstown were all to return at various times.

There were also numerous rules changes in this early period.

==== Growth outside of Melbourne ====
Not all football was played in Melbourne and the Goldfields experienced its own boom in competition in the 1880s and 1890s. By 1881, the Sandhurst Football Association had formed with a number of clubs in what is now Bendigo. Ballarat was to follow with its own Ballarat Football Association in 1893, giving some of the oldest clubs outside of Melbourne including Ballarat (1860) and Sandhurst (1861) clubs and the growing number of clubs in country Victoria some regular competition. While strong popular competitions in their own right, their member clubs were to become strong feeder clubs to the big metropolitan leagues.

==== Formation of the VFL ====
A rift in the VFA led to the formation of the Victorian Football League (VFL), which commenced play in 1897 as an eight-team breakaway of the stronger clubs in the VFA competition: Carlton, Collingwood, Essendon, Fitzroy, Geelong, Melbourne, St Kilda and South Melbourne. The first season concluded with Essendon finishing as the premiers (winners).

Another four VFA clubs joined the VFL later, as Richmond joined the VFL in 1908. Footscray, Hawthorn and North Melbourne joined in 1925, by which time VFL had become the most prominent league in the game. University also joined the VFL in 1908 but left in 1915.

=== National league and current issues ===
In 1982, in a move which heralded big changes within the sport, one of the original VFL clubs, South Melbourne Football Club, relocated to the rugby league stronghold of Sydney and became known as the Sydney Swans.

In the late 1980s, strong interstate interest in the VFL led to a more national competition; two more non-Victorian clubs, the West Coast Eagles and the Brisbane Bears began playing in 1987.

The league changed its name to the Australian Football League (AFL) following the 1989 season, later gaining further West Australian and South Australian teams.

The VFA/VFL became a secondary league, although even it has grown to accommodate a team from Tasmania.

Even the biggest locally grown suburban clubs, elevated into the national league, continue struggle for survival, competing for marketshare. Fourteen years after South Melbourne's difficulties led them to move to Sydney, similar problems at the Fitzroy Football Club result in a merger, forming the Brisbane Lions. Although a small consolation of these club's recent success has been establishing renewed interest with their Melbourne based supporters, other clubs, such as the historic Melbourne, Western Bulldogs (formerly Footscray), North Melbourne and Carlton Clubs are assisted by the AFL to remain in the national competition. Many suggestions have been made in response to issues of overcrowding but the AFL has been somewhat reluctant to make a drastic change, due to both the history and supporters' passion for their club – save for the merger of Fitzroy and the Bears.

== Participation ==
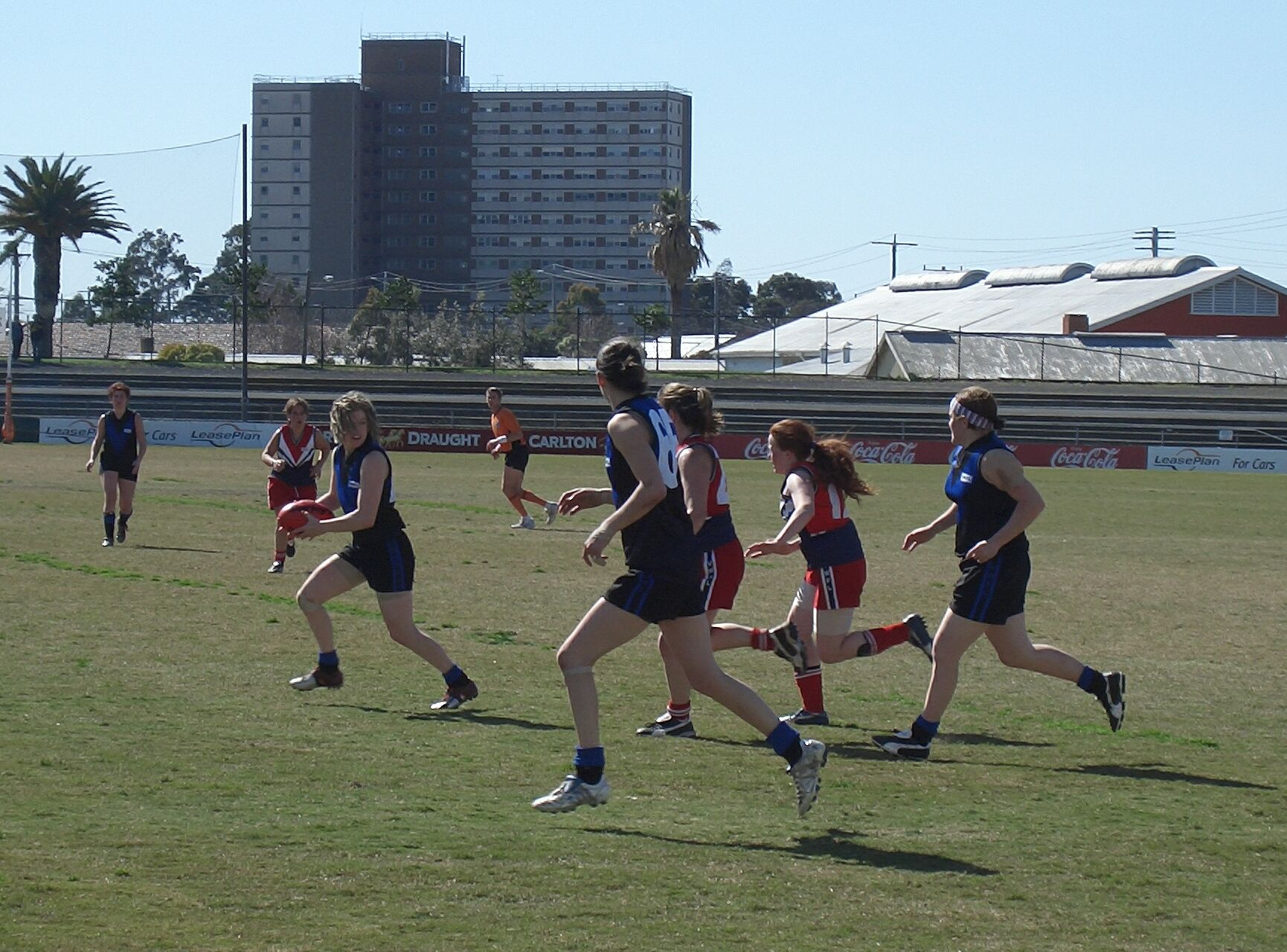
Women's Australian rules football is growing in popularity in Victoria.

In 2004, with 36,900 senior players in Victoria, more than any other state in Australia.

With a total participation of 223,999, Victoria has a participation rate of around 4% per capita, makes it the equal third most supported state (with Western Australia and South Australia)

Adult players
2016	2022/23	2023/24
209,117	235,970	227,213

== Audience ==
=== Attendance record ===
- 121,696 (1970). VFL Grand Final Carlton v Collingwood (MCG, Melbourne)

== Major Australian rules events in Victoria ==
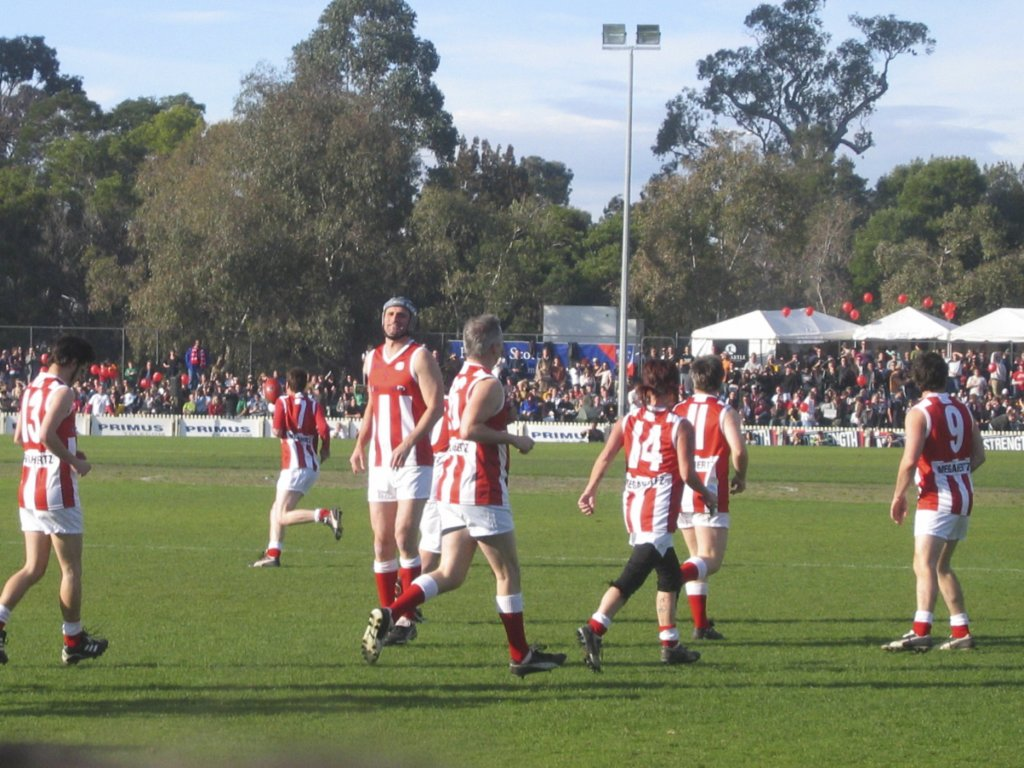
2005 Community Cup

- Australian Football League Premiership Season including special matches:
  Anzac Day match, Dreamtime at the 'G and King's Birthday match
- AFL Grand Final (annual)
- VFL Grand Final (annual)
- International Rules Series (biennial)
- Australian Football International Cup (quadrennial free event)
- E. J. Whitten Legends Game (annual charity event)
- Community Cup (annual charity event)
- Multicultural Cup (annual free event)
- Ovens & Murray Football League Grand Final (annual)

== Notable Victorian footballers ==
Australian Football Hall of Fame players with Legend status from Victoria (in order of induction) include: Ron Barassi, Haydn Bunton Sr., Roy Cazaly, John Coleman, Jack Dyer, Bill Hutchison, Leigh Matthews, John Nicholls, Bob Pratt, Dick Reynolds, Bob Skilton, Ted Whitten, Ian Stewart, Gordon Coventry, Kevin Bartlett, Jock McHale, Norm Smith, Kevin Murray, Tony Lockett, Kevin Sheedy and John Kennedy Sr.

Victorians represent the vast majority of male Australian Football Hall of Fame inductees.

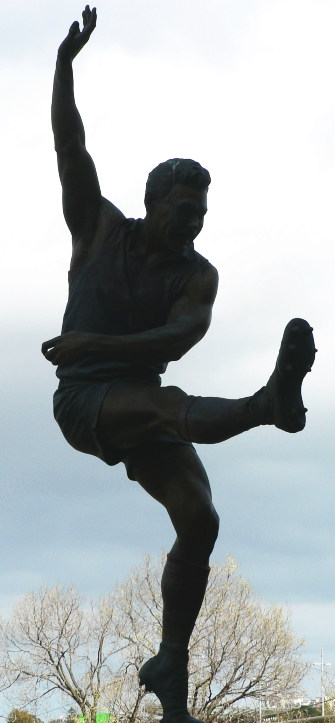
Ron Barassi statue at the MCG

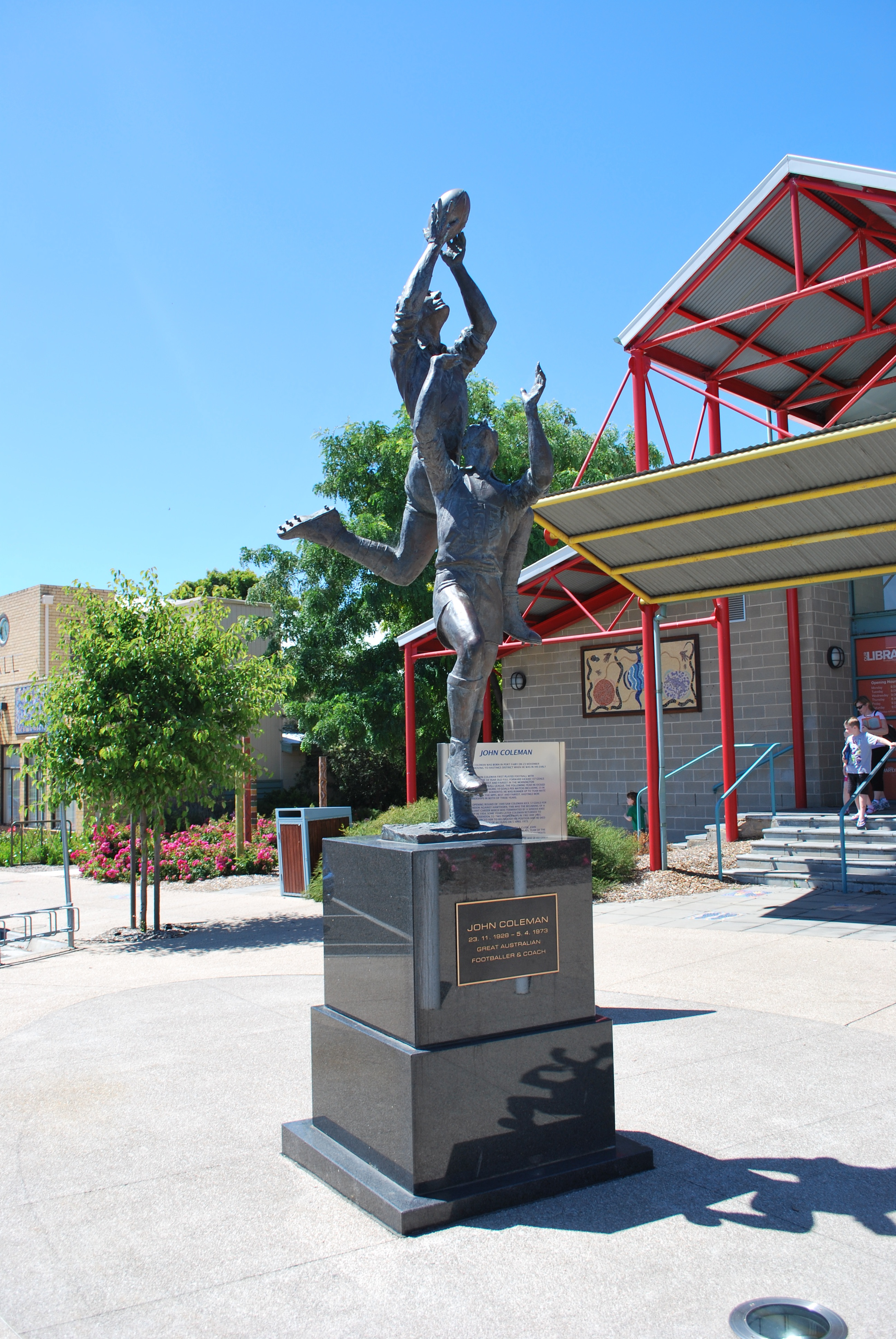
John Coleman statue at Hastings, Victoria

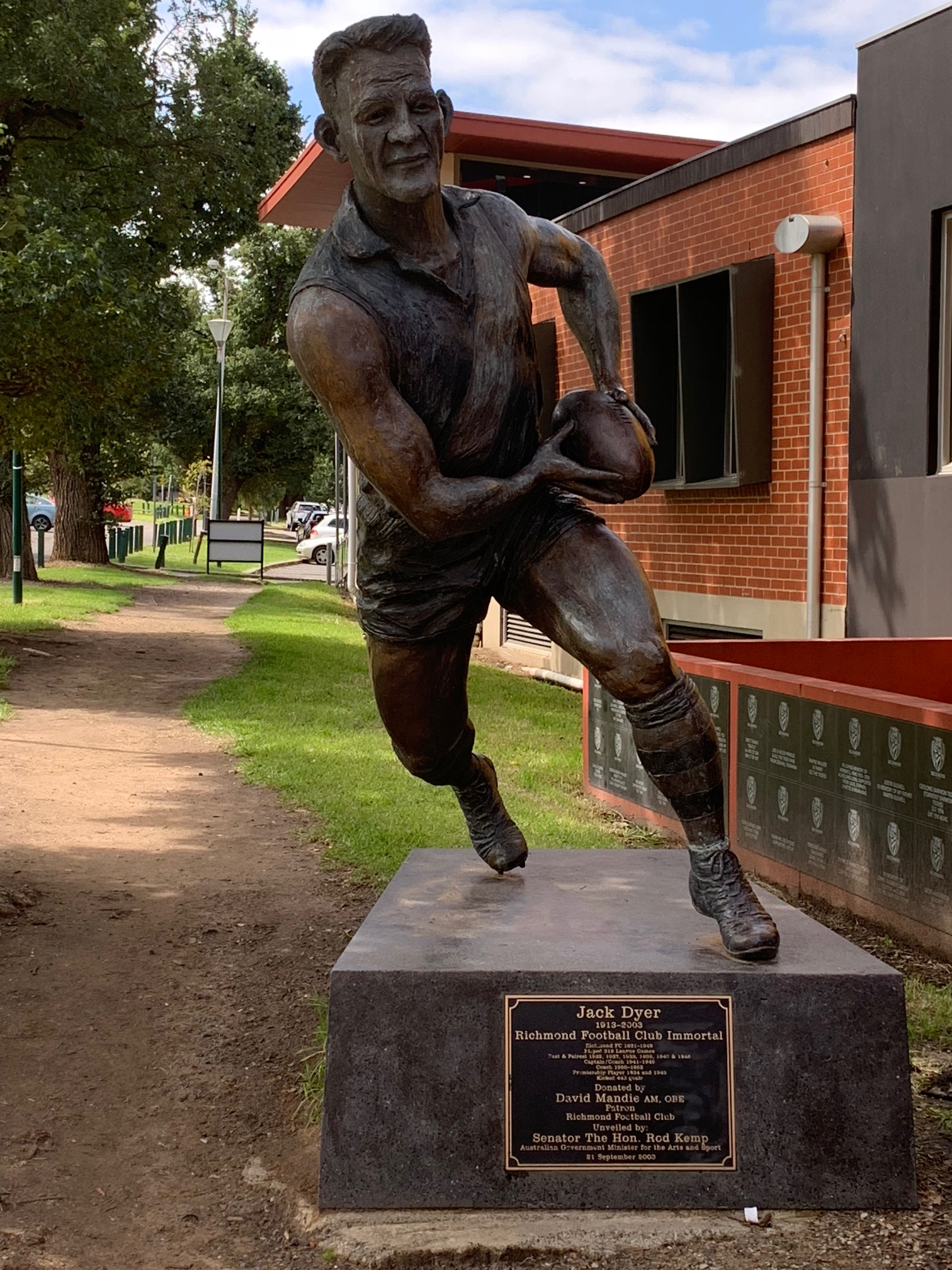
Jack Dyer statue at the Punt Road Oval

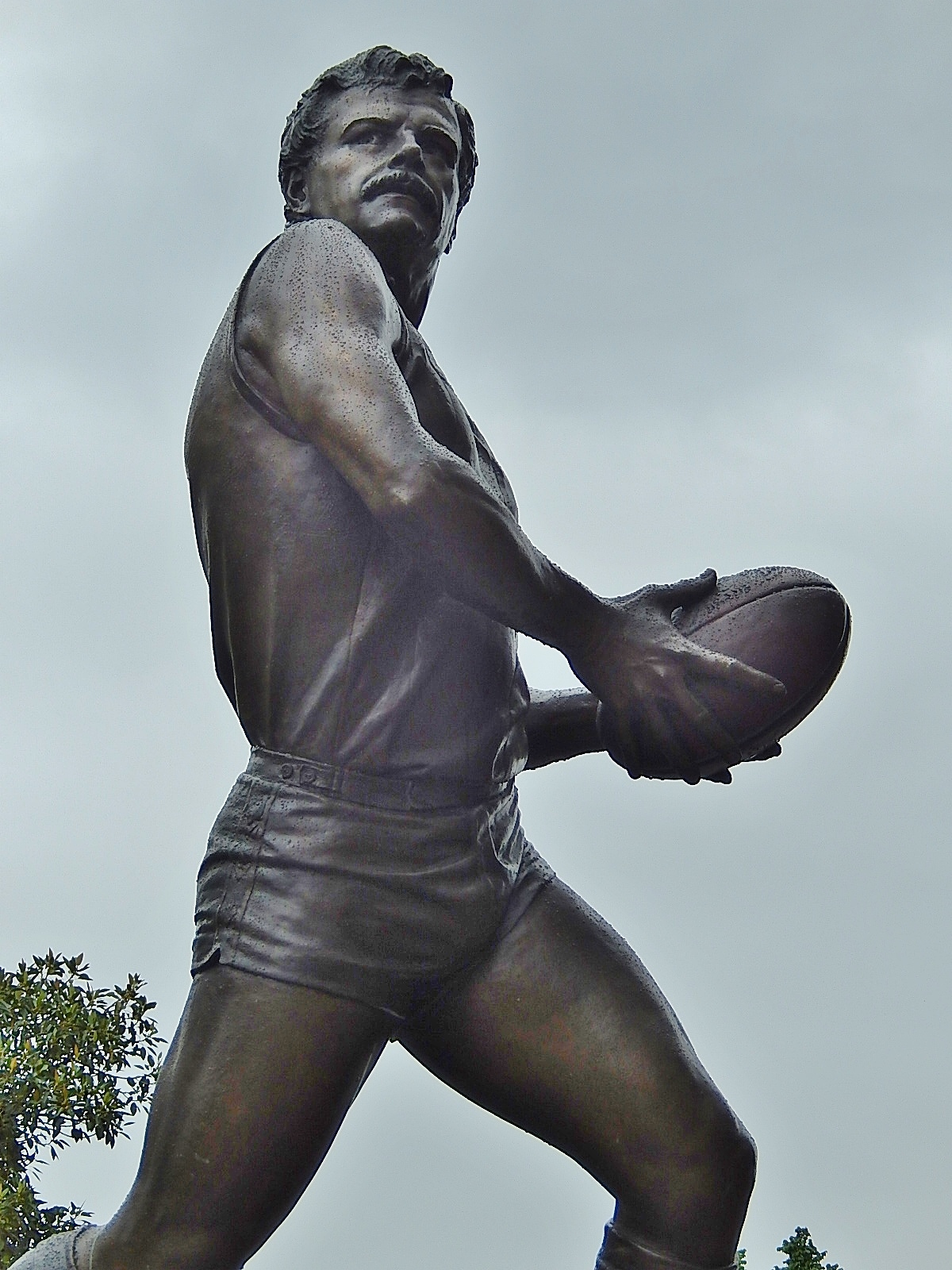
Leigh Matthews statue at MCG

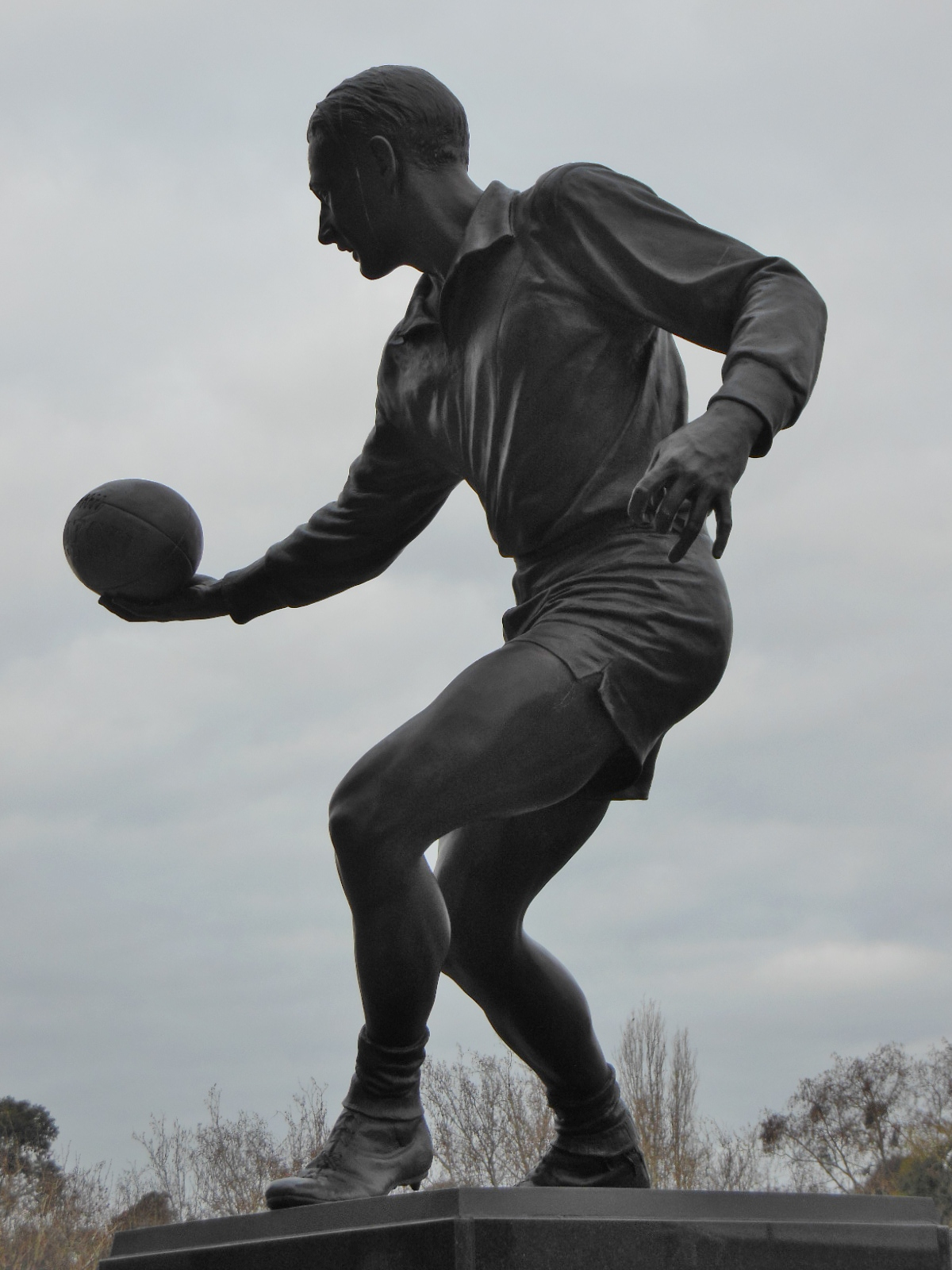
Dick Reynolds statue at MCG

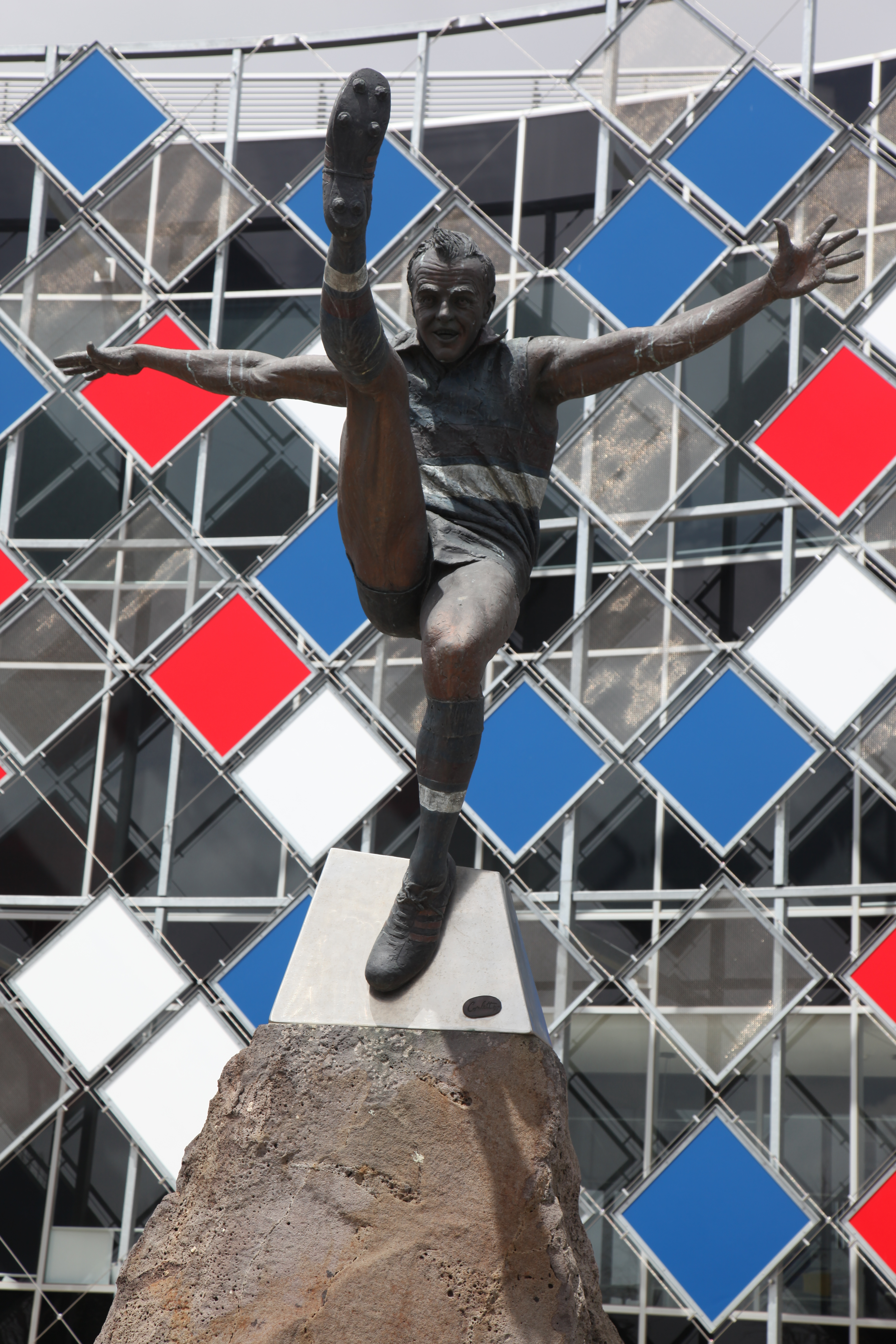
Ted Whitten statue at Whitten Oval

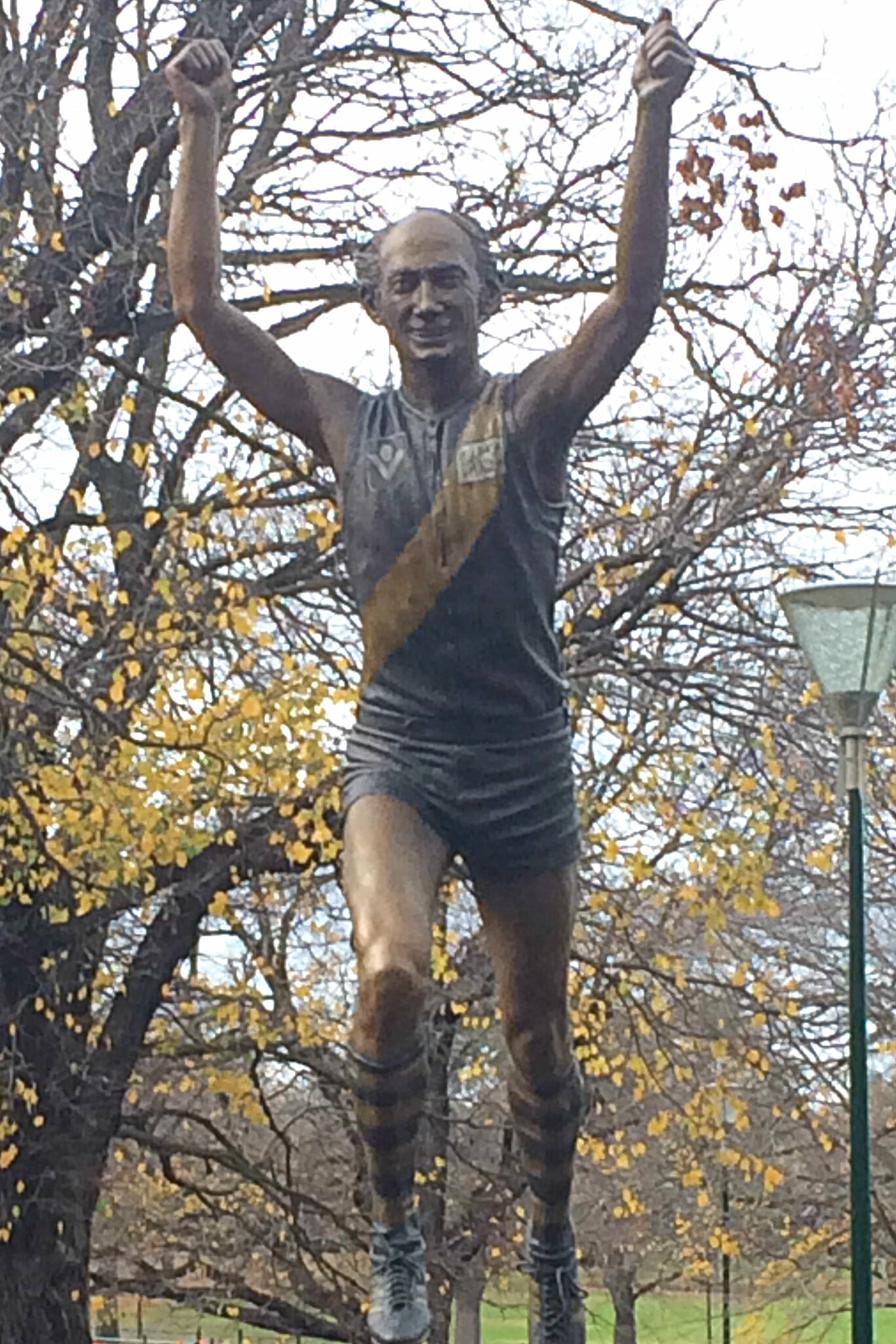
Kevin Bartlett statue at the MCG

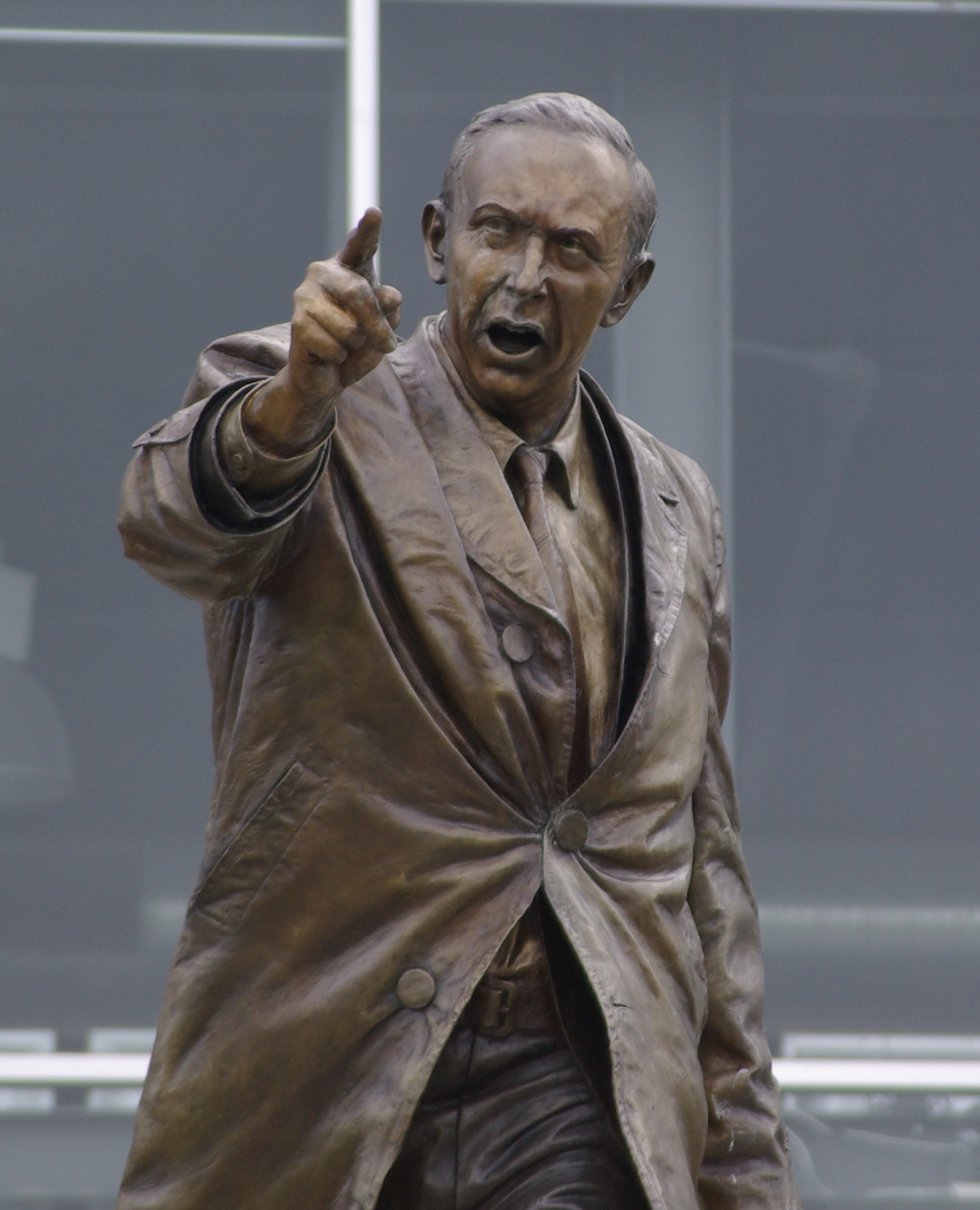
John Kennedy Sr. statue at Waverley Park

Notable female players include: Debbie Lee (first female member of the Australian Football Hall of Fame), Daisy Pearce. Erin Phillips was born in Melbourne.

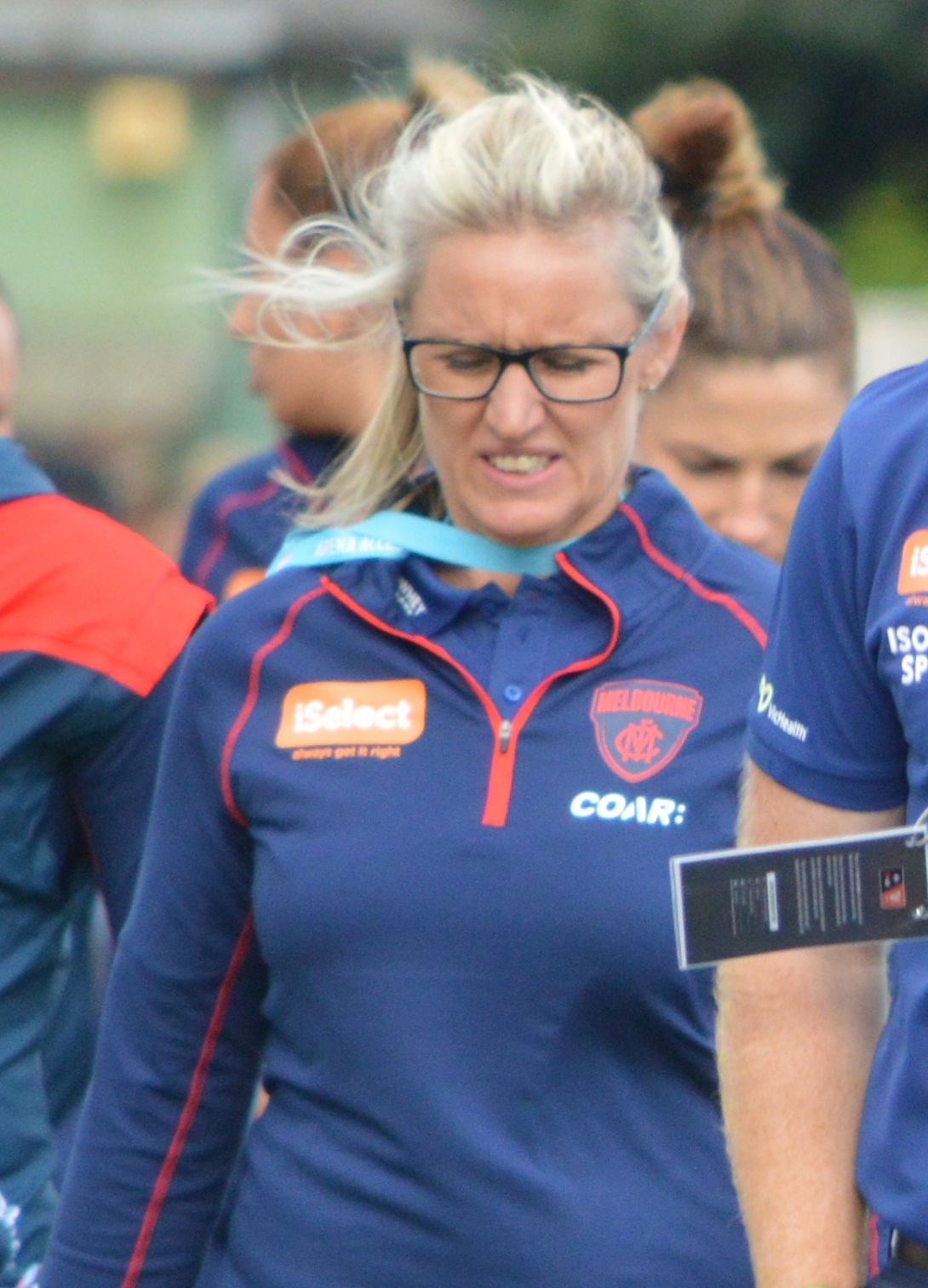
Debbie Lee

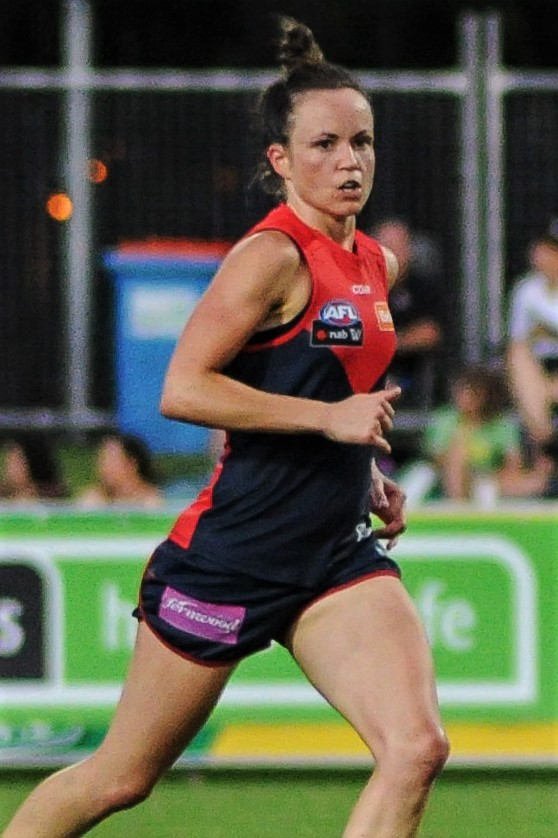
Daisy Pearce

== Governing body ==
The governing body for Australian rules football in Victoria is AFL Victoria.

== Leagues and clubs ==
=== Professional clubs ===
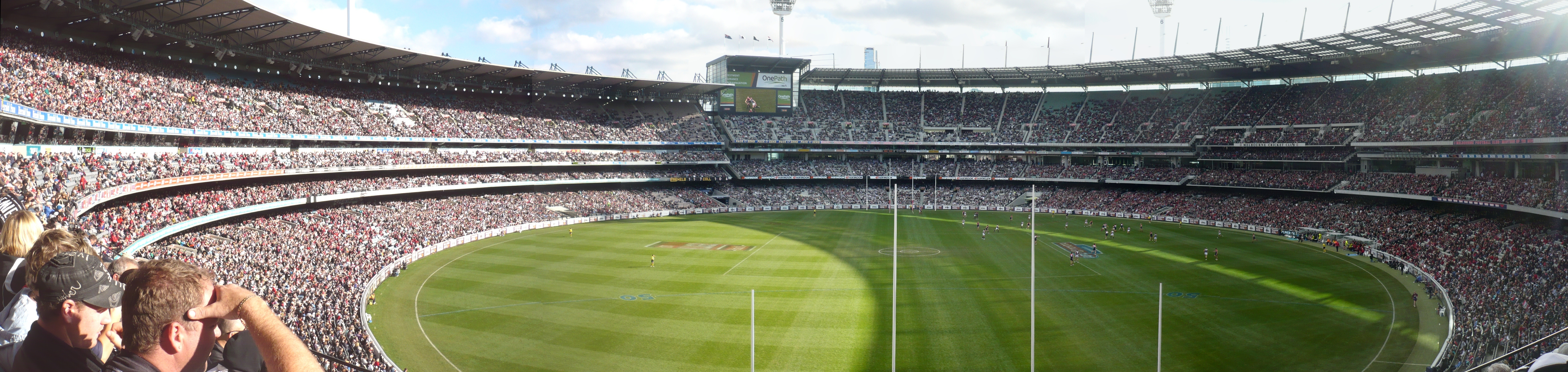
An AFL premiership season match at the game's spiritual home, the Melbourne Cricket Ground.

- Carlton Football Club (Australian Football League)
- Collingwood Football Club (Australian Football League)
- Essendon Football Club (Australian Football League)
- Geelong Football Club (Australian Football League)
- Hawthorn Football Club (Australian Football League)
- Melbourne Football Club (Australian Football League)
- North Melbourne Football Club (Australian Football League)
- Richmond Football Club (Australian Football League)
- St Kilda Football Club (Australian Football League)
- Western Bulldogs (formerly Footscray Football Club) (Australian Football League)

=== Open ===
==== Statewide leagues ====
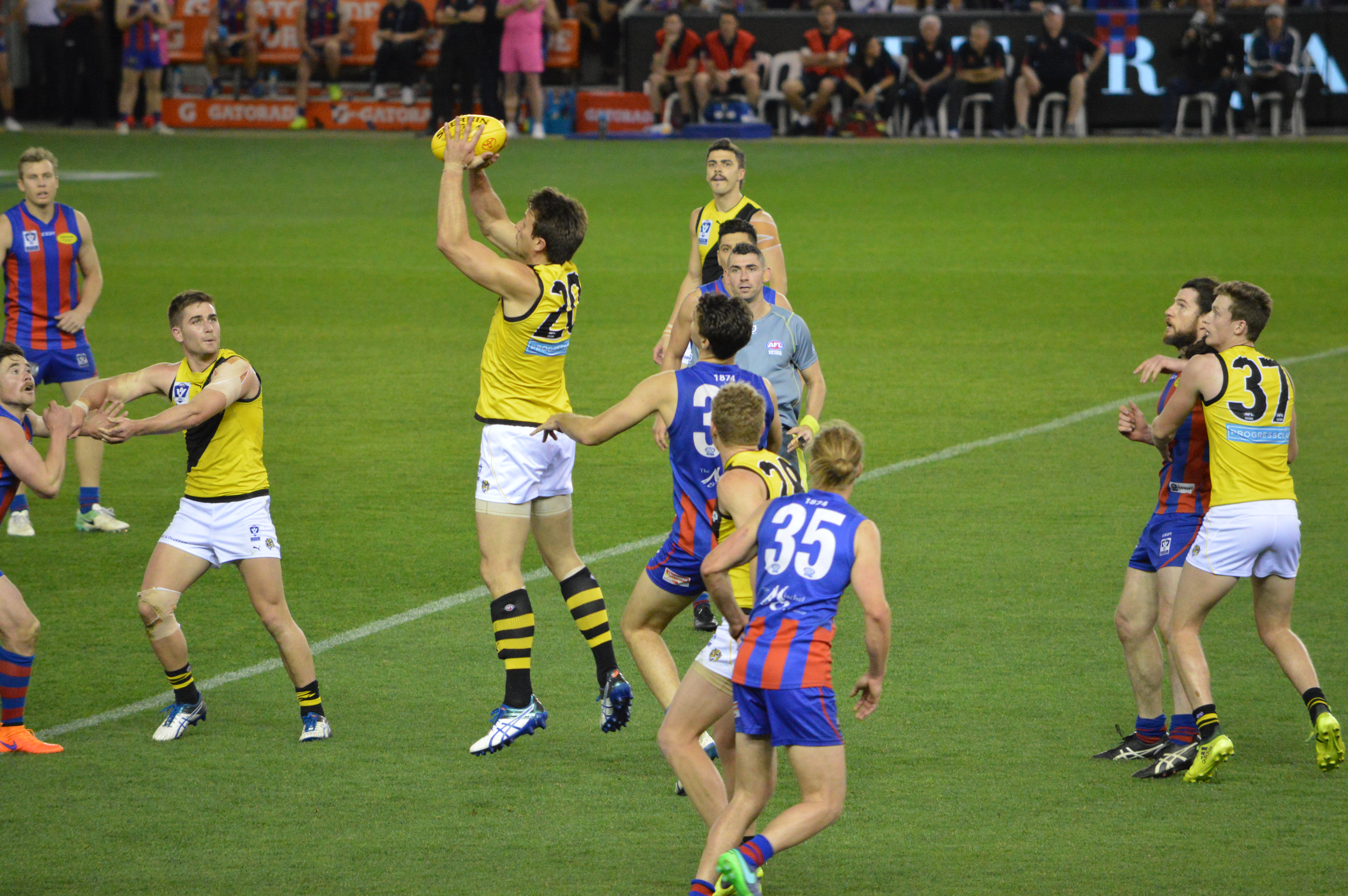
Action from the 2017 VFL Grand Final at Docklands Stadium.

- Victorian Football League

==== Melbourne metropolitan leagues ====
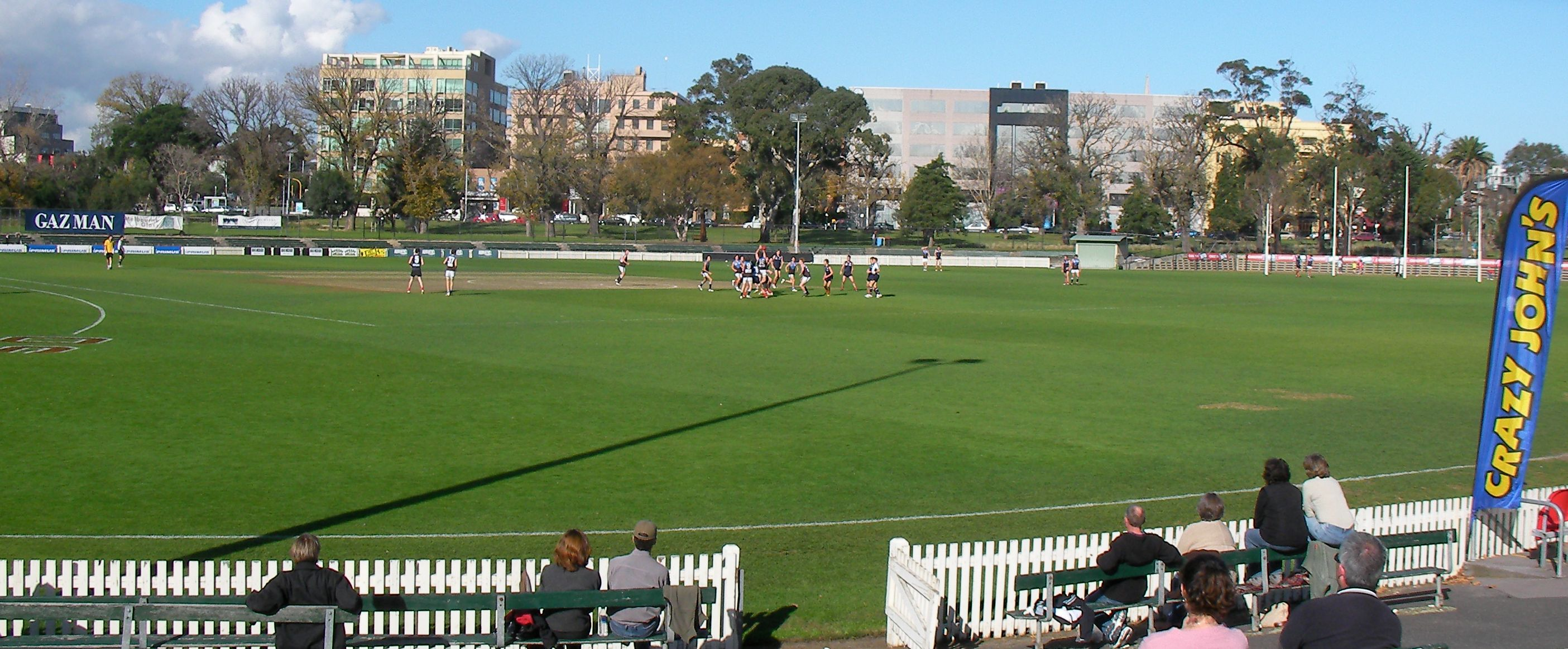
A VAFA match at the Junction Oval. Founded in 1892, the VAFA is the largest senior community competition in Victoria

- Eastern Football League
- Essendon District Football League
- Northern Football League
- Southern Football League
- Victorian Amateur Football Association
- Western Region Football League
- Riddell District Football League

==== Regional leagues ====
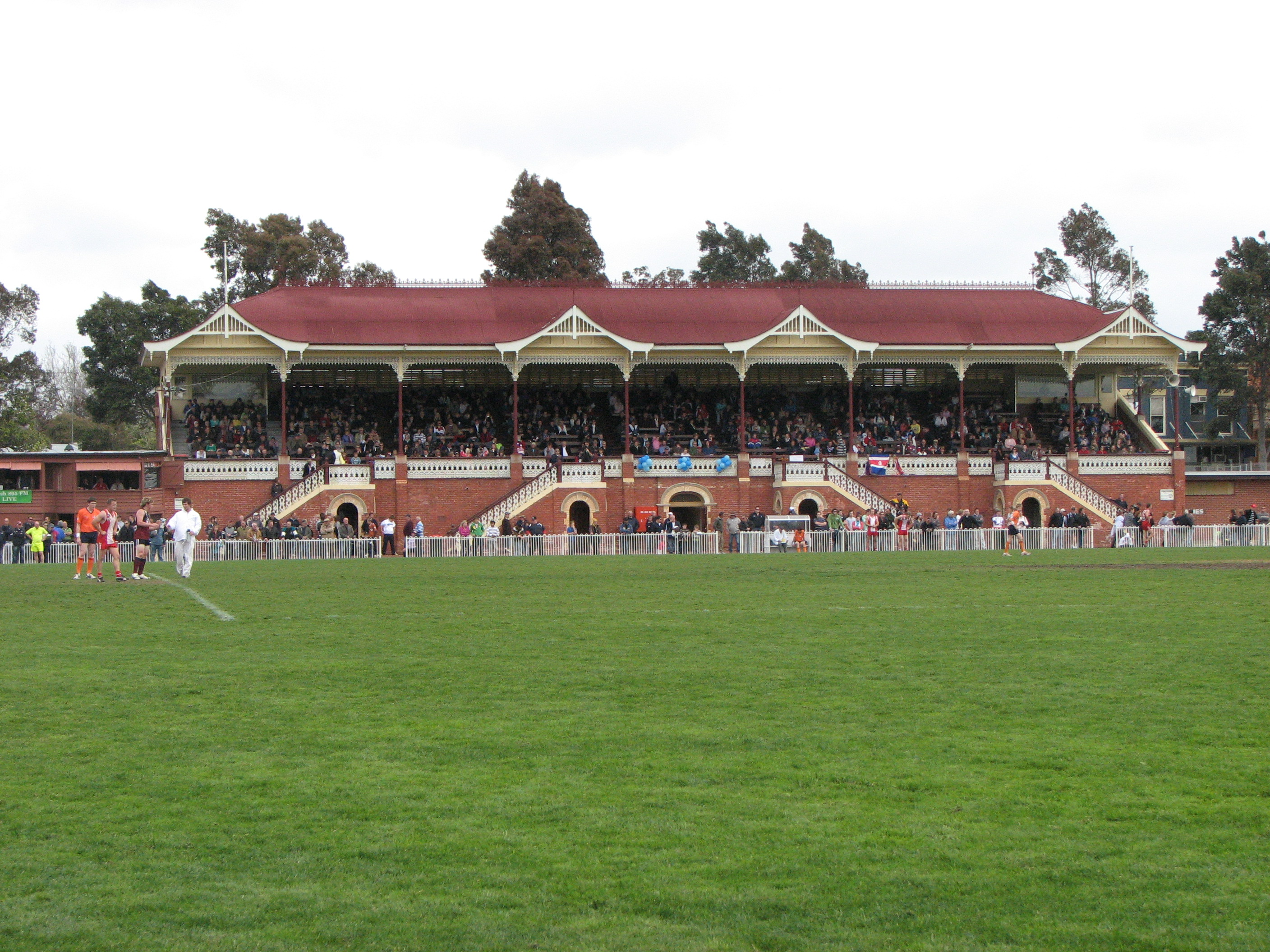
A Bendigo Football League match attracts a large crowd at the Queen Elizabeth Oval

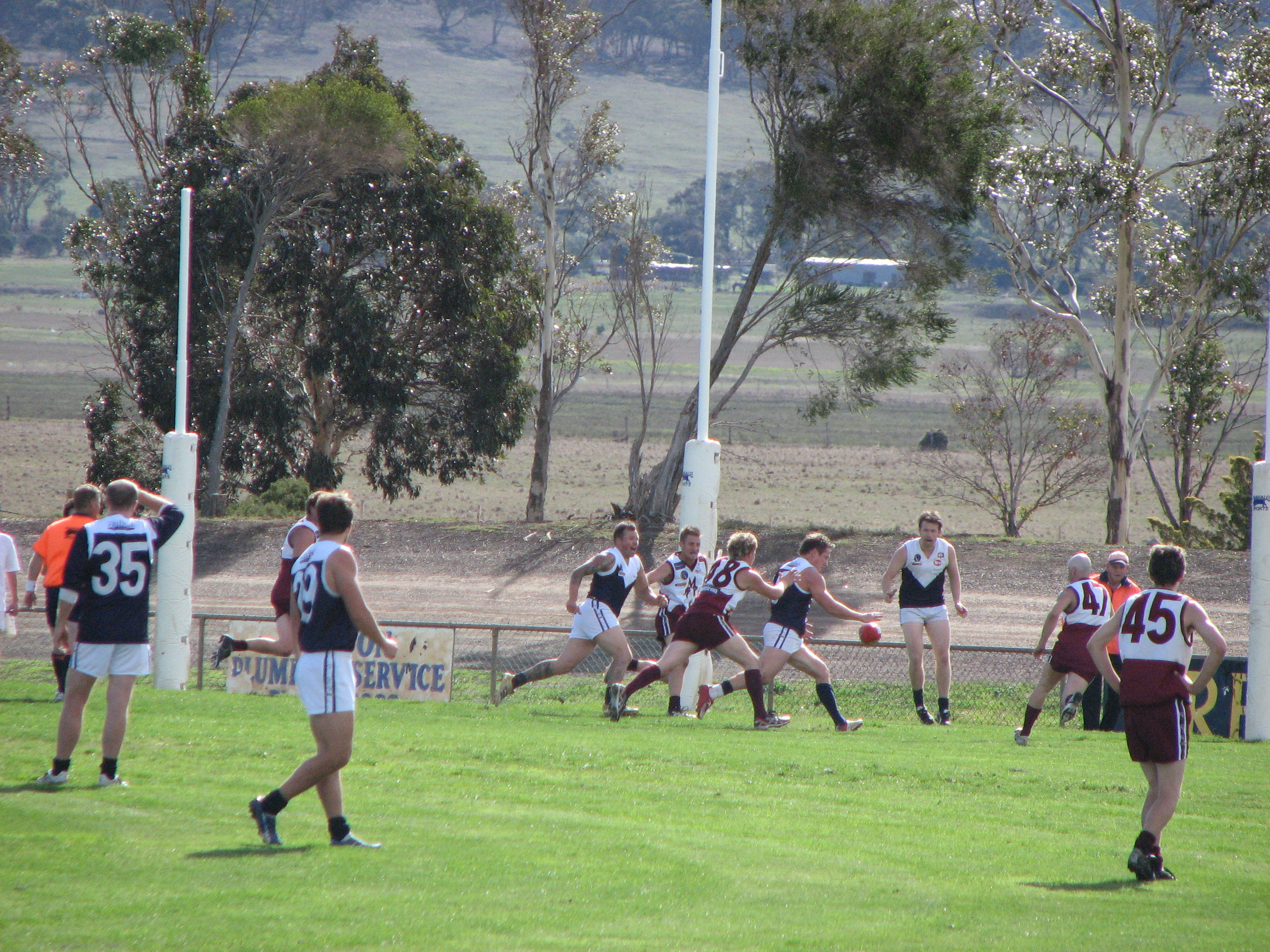
A Ballarat Football League reserves match in Melton

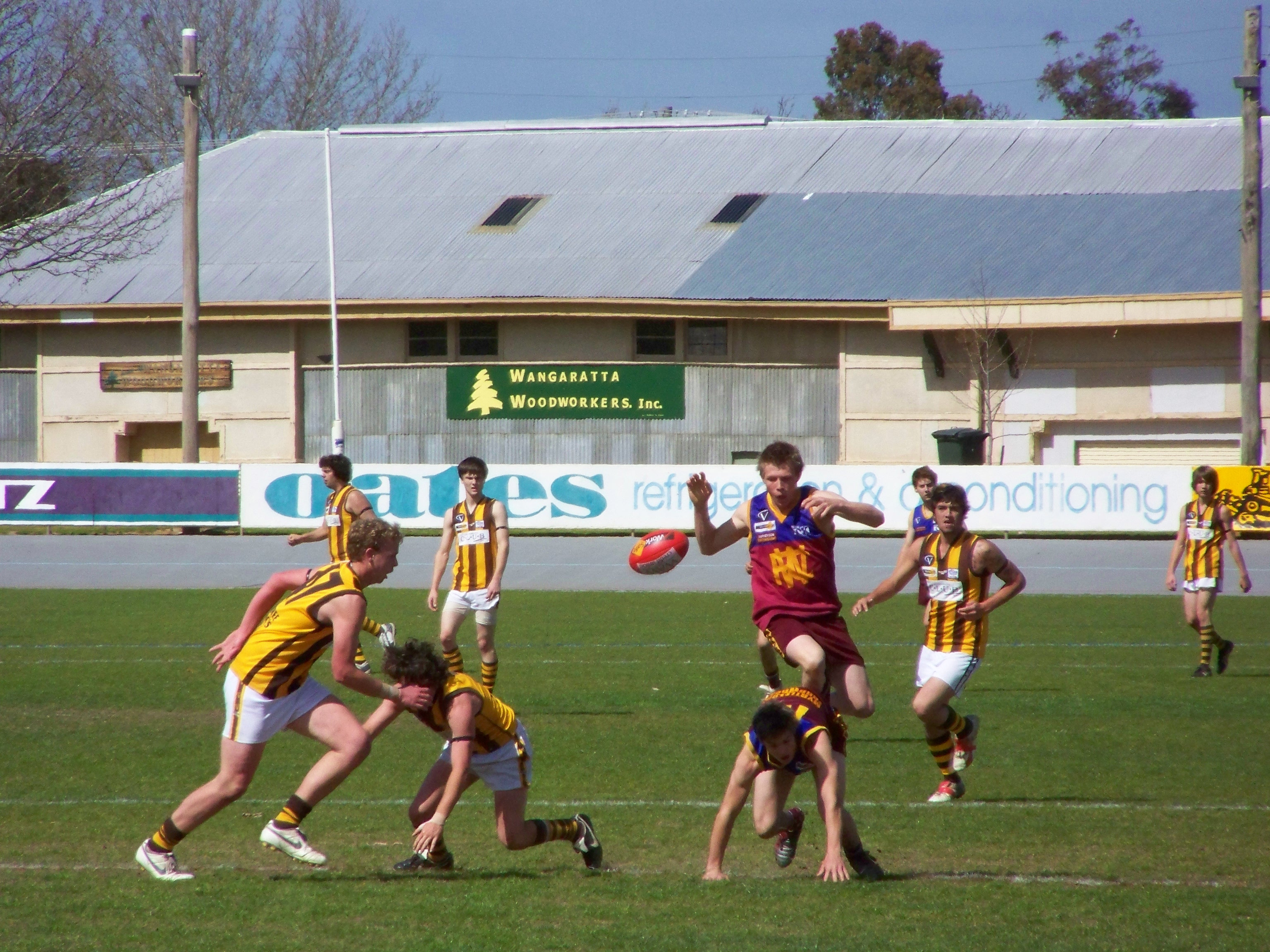
Action from a lower division of the Ovens & King Football League

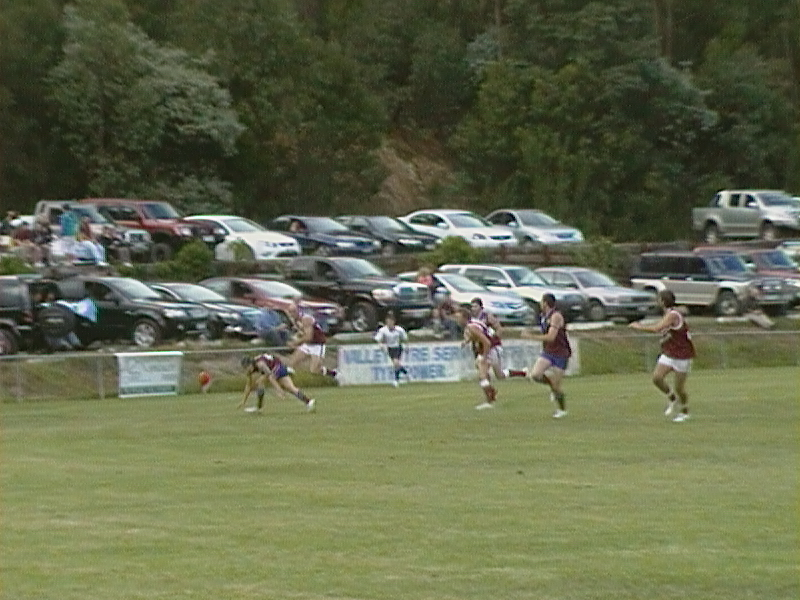
Gippsland Football League match between Traralgon and Moe

- Victorian Country Football League Official Site (governing body over regional Victoria)
- Ballarat Football League
- Bellarine Football League
- Bendigo Football League
- Central Highlands Football League
- Central Murray Football League
- Colac & District Football League Official Site
- East Gippsland Football League Official Site
- Ellinbank & District Football League Official Site
- Geelong Football League Official Site
- Geelong & District Football League Official Site
- Gippsland Football League Official Site
- Goulburn Valley Football League
- Golden Rivers Football League
- Hampden Football Netball League Official Site
- Heathcote District Football League Official Site
- Horsham & District Football League Official Site
- Kowree Naracoorte Tatiara Football League
- Kyabram & District Football League
- Loddon Valley Football League Official Site
- Maryborough Castlemaine District Football League Official Site
- Mid Gippsland Football League Official Site
- Millewa Football League Official Site
- Mininera & District Football League Official Site
- Mornington Peninsula Nepean Football League Official Site
- Murray Football League Official Site
- North Central Football League Official Site
- North Gippsland Football League Official Site
- Omeo & District Football League Official Site
- Outer East Football Netball League
- Ovens & King Football League Official Site
- Ovens & Murray Football League
- Picola & District Football League
- South West District Football League Official Site
- Sunraysia Football League Official Site
- Tallangatta & District Football League Official Site
- Upper Murray Football League Official Site
- Warrnambool & District Football League Official Site
- Wimmera Football League Official Site

=== Junior ===
- Warragul & District Junior Football League
- Riddell District Junior Football League Official Site
- Yarra Junior Football League
- Waverley Junior Football Association Official Site
- South Metro Junior Football League Official Site
- Dandenong & District Junior Football League Official Site
- Central Gippsland Junior Football League
- Traralgon & District Junior Football League

=== Masters ===
- Victorian Metropolitan Superules Football Official Site
- Victorian Country Masters Australian Football Official Site

=== Women's ===
- Victorian Women's Football League
- Youth Girls Competition Official Site

== Principal venues ==
The following venues meet AFL Standard criteria and have been used to host recent AFL (National Standard), VFL or AFLW level matches (Regional Standard) are listed by capacity.

Many former suburban VFL/AFL venues became disused when the league consolidated at its flagship stadium at Docklands and with its increased national/regional city focus, however the AFLW (and VFL) has since seen some of these former stadiums reused and renovated albeit with downgraded or reduced capacity.

Melbourne	Melbourne	Geelong
Melbourne Cricket Ground	Docklands Stadium	Kardinia Park
Capacity: 100,024	Capacity: 55,347	Capacity: 40,000
Record: 121,696 (1970)	Record: 54,444 (2009)	Record: 49,109 (1952)
Melbourne Cricket Ground	Docklands Stadium	Kardinia Park
Wangaratta	Melbourne	Melbourne
Norm Minns Oval	Coburg City Oval	Princes Park
Capacity: 15,000	Capacity: 15,000	Capacity: 12,000
Record: 11,000 (2013)	Record: 21,626 (1965)	Record: 62,986 (1945)
The Showgrounds Oval	Coburg City Oval	Princes Park
Ballarat	Melbourne	Bendigo
Eureka Stadium	Victoria Park	Queen Elizabeth Oval
Capacity: 11,000	Capacity: 10,000	Capacity: 10,000
Record: 10,412 (2022)	Record: 47,000 (1948)	Record: 16,600 (1957)
Eureka Stadium	Victoria Park	Queen Elizabeth Oval
Melbourne	Melbourne	Melbourne
Whitten Oval	Box Hill City Oval	Windy Hill
Capacity: 10,000	Capacity: 10,000	Capacity: 10,000
Record: 42,354 (1955)	Record: 6,200 (1983)	Record: 43,487 (1966)
Whitten Oval	Box Hill City Oval	Windy Hill
Melbourne	Melbourne	Melbourne
Moorabbin Oval	Chirnside Park	Casey Fields
Capacity: 10,000	Capacity: 9,000	Capacity: 9,000
Record: 51,370 (1965)	Record: 10,000 (1982)	Record: 10,099 (2007)
Moorabbin Oval	Chirnside Park	Casey Fields
Melbourne	Melbourne	Melbourne
Frankston Park	Preston City Oval	Arden Street Oval
Capacity: 5,000	Capacity: 5,000	Capacity: 4,000
Record: 3,722 (2023)	Record: unknown	Record: 35,116 (1949)
Frankston Park	Preston City Oval	Arden Street Oval

=== Low capacity and lesser used venues (AFL Standard) ===
- Morwell Recreation Reserve (Morwell)
- Deakin Reserve (Shepparton)
- Punt Road Oval (Melbourne)
- Trevor Barker Beach Oval (Melbourne)

=== Low capacity and lesser used venues (non-AFL Standard) ===
- Elsternwick Park (Melbourne) (home of the VAFA)
- Williamstown Cricket Ground (Melbourne)
- Yarraville Oval (Melbourne)
- North Port Oval (Melbourne)
- Skinner Reserve (Melbourne)
- Eastern Oval (Ballarat)

=== Former venues ===
- Waverley Park (1970-2000) (also known as VFL Park)
- Glenferrie Oval (1925–1973) (former home of the Hawthorn Football Club)
- Lakeside Oval (1874-1995) (former home of the South Melbourne Football Club) (now primarily soccer venue)
- Junction Oval (1870-1966) (now primarily cricket venue)
- East Melbourne Cricket Ground (1860-1921)
- Brunswick Street Oval (1883-1966) (former home of the Fitzroy Football Club)
- Corio Oval (1862-1944) (former home of the Geelong Football Club)

== Representative team ==
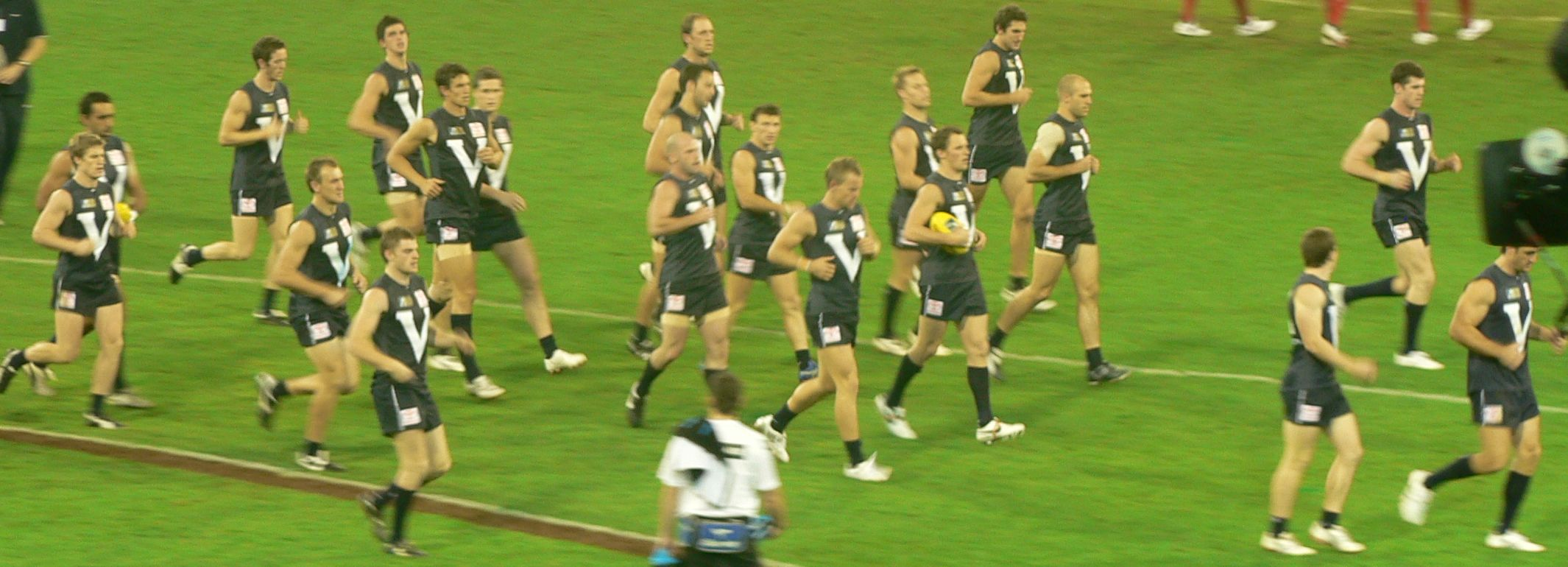
The Big V running out for the AFL Hall of Fame Tribute Match in 2008. (From left to right – Luke Power, Adam Goodes, Robert Murphy, Darren Milburn, Scott Pendlebury, Heath Shaw, Troy Simmonds, Trent Croad, Paul Chapman, Josh Fraser, Jimmy Bartel, Brent Harvey, Ryan O'Keefe, Sam Mitchell, Steve Johnson, Jarrad Waite, Chris Judd, Jonathan Brown, Daniel Bradshaw.)

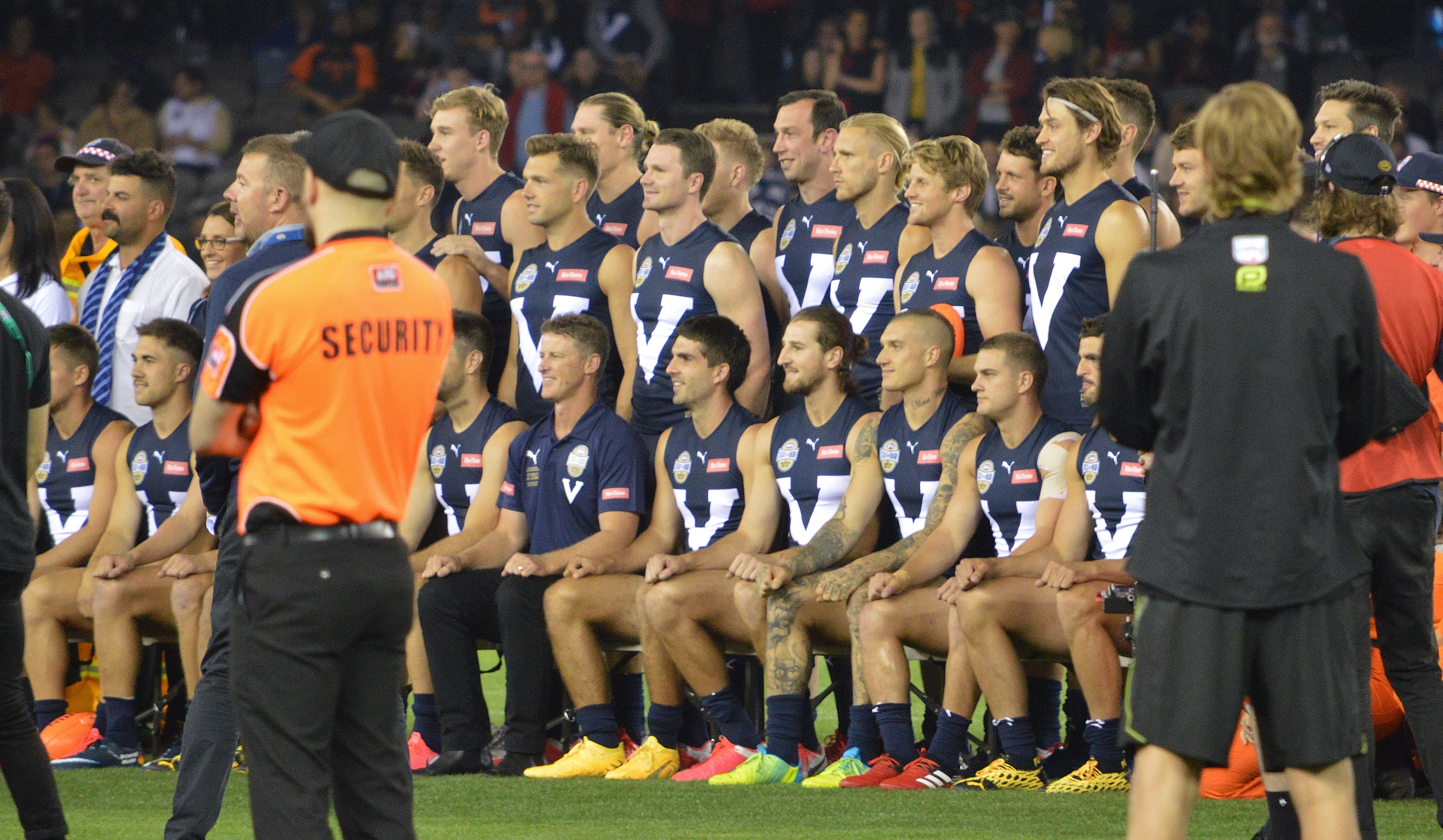
The Big V in 2020

The Victorian representative team, nicknamed the Big V, debuted in 1879 and have played against and defeated all other Australian states. It was the dominant team until the introduction of State of Origin rules in 1977 after which its dominance was challenged by Western Australia. The Big V have seldom appeared since 1999, with the exception of the 2008 AFL Hall of Fame Tribute Match, 2020 State of Origin for Bushfire Relief Match and 2026 AFL Origin.

At underage level, Victoria is split into Vic Metro and Vic Country sides which compete annually in the AFL National Championships.

=== Uniforms ===
Victoria (VFA)	Victoria (VFL)

Victoria State of Origin guernsey.

== See also ==
- List of Australian rules football leagues in Australia
- History of Australian rules football in Victoria (1859–1900)
