= AFL Victoria =

Sports governing body in Victoria, Australia

- Sport: Australian rules football
- Jurisdiction: Victoria
- Founded: 1999; 27 years ago
- Affiliation: AFL
- Headquarters: Docklands, Melbourne
- CEO: Greg Madigan
- Replaced: Victorian State Football League
- (founded): 1992

Official website
- aflvic.com.au
- (Victoria (state))

AFL Victoria (formerly Football Victoria) is the state-level sport governing body for Australian rules football in the state of Victoria, Australia.

== Responsibility ==
AFL Victoria, as part of the sport's national governing body the AFL, has the overarching responsibility for approximately 115 leagues – including the Victorian Football League (VFL), the Victorian Amateur Football Association, the AFL Victoria Country, and all local metropolitan and country leagues – and 1,942 clubs, (not including the state's ten Australian Football League clubs) as well as developmental, coaching, and umpiring bodies. These country and metropolitan leagues are a source of income for many amateur footballers throughout Victoria and many hold tradition and history dating back over 100 years.

Football Victoria took over the organization of the VFL competition in 1999, replacing the Victorian State Football League as the peak governing body for Australian rules football in Victoria, under the Australian Football League Commission. The organization filling the gap created in 1990 when the previous state governing body (the Victorian Football League) expanded its scope nationally to become the Australian Football League. AFL Victoria also took over the direct operation of the Victorian Metropolitan Football League (VMFL) on 26 February 2002, bringing its members under the direct control of AFL Victoria.

In 2007, Football Victoria adopted the name AFL Victoria releasing a statement:

"Adopting the name of AFL Victoria will reinforce the organization's own position and also boost the position of the AFL brand as AFL Victoria works and the AFL work together to expand the reach of football in the face of increasing competition."

== History ==
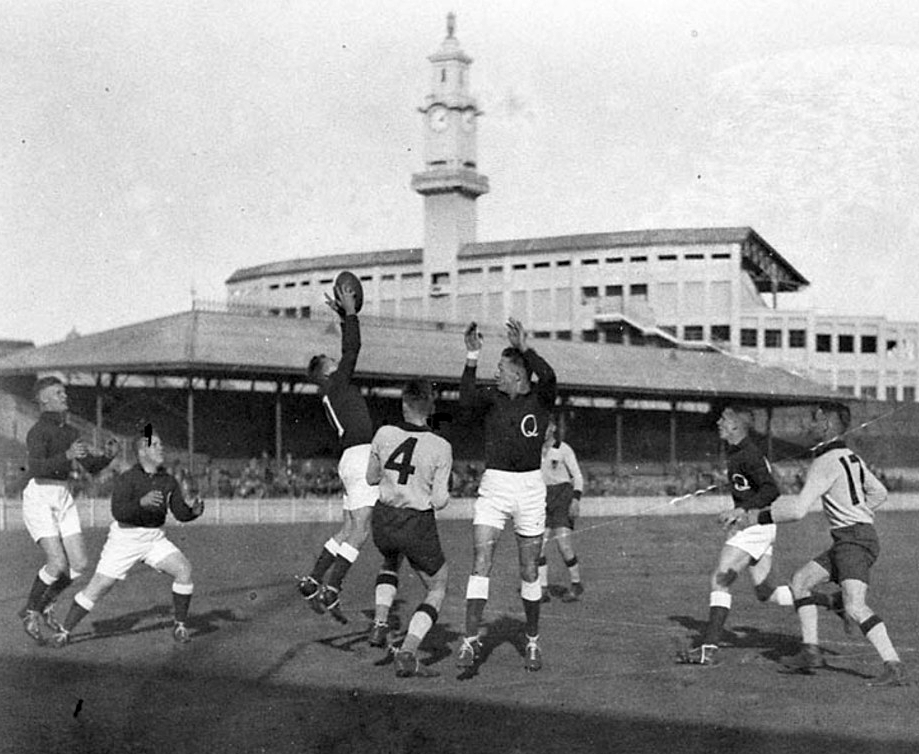

Australian rules football originated in Melbourne in the late 1850s. One of the earliest records is Melbourne between Melbourne Grammar School and Scotch College, Melbourne , beginning on 7 August 1859.

Once established, the game formed an official set of rules in May 1859. Thomas Wentworth Wills and others assembled to create them. Initially, the cricket clubs were reluctant to allow football to be played in their parks, as it damaged the turf, but after realising potential financial gain from the growing crowds, football became even more established within the city and country lifestyle of everyday Victorians. As covers began to be charged for spectators, they also began voicing their opinions for changes to the game such as a governing body to be put in place to create an organization to run things more smoothly.

=== Board Members (2026) ===
- Lindsay Tanner - Chair
- Grant O’Riley - Director
- Jenny Taing Oam - Director
- Damian Drum - Director
- Clare Walker - Director
- Rob Auld - Director
- Greg Madigan - Director
- Kayla Bannister - Secretary

== Cultural and national diversity ==
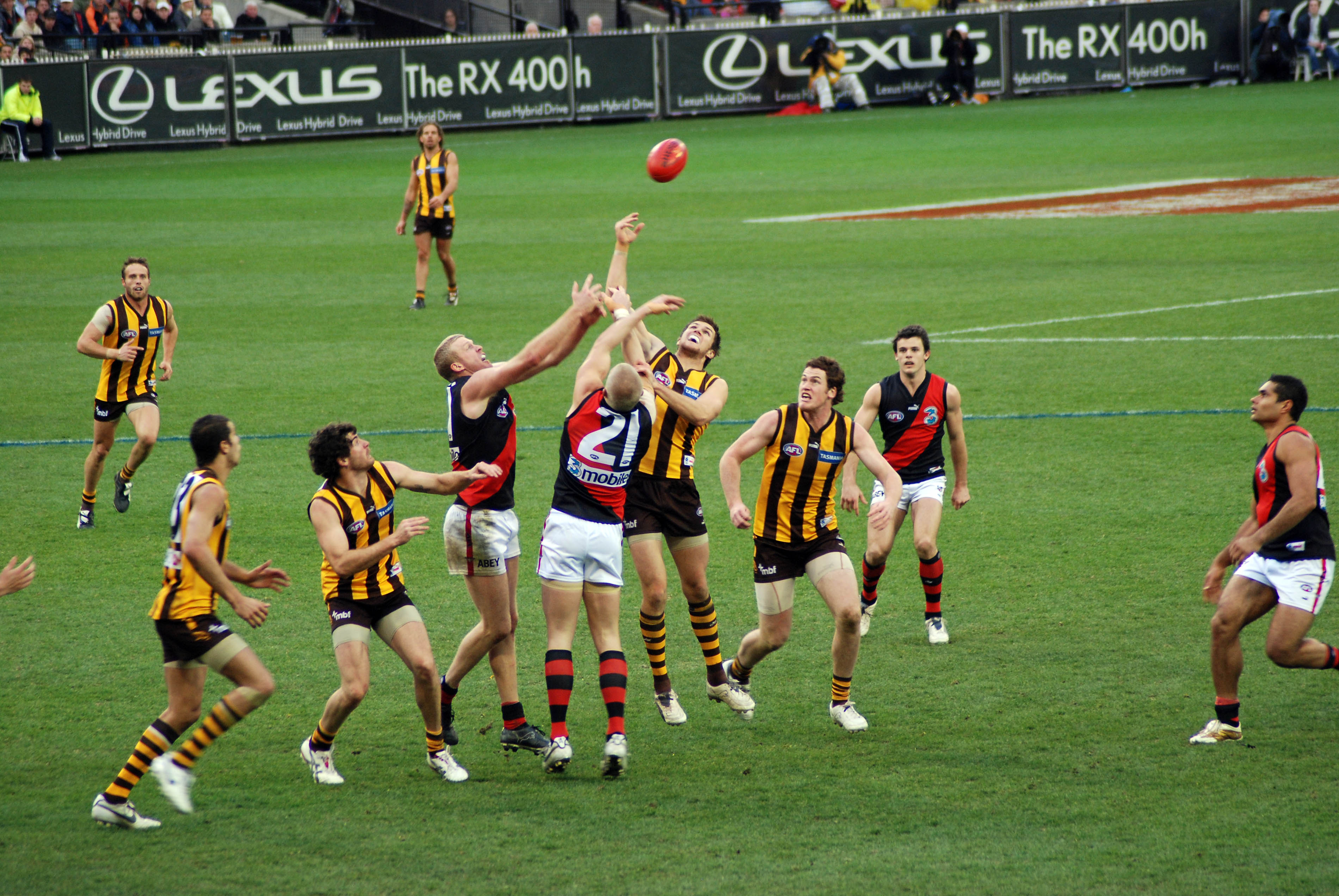
An AFL match between Hawthorn Vs Essendon

AFL Victoria created The Game Development Cultural Diversity Action Plan to create a better environment for culturally diverse communities and people. It aims to be a place based plan with a design focused around the specific communities being played in and enabling access to the game to prioritised Local Government Areas (LGAs) through initiatives such as AFL Community Connect and AFL School Connect programs.

AFL Victoria has also implemented multiple leagues to include and cater to people with disabilities , such as bringing in the Victorian Wheelchair Football League (VWFL), The Victorian Blind Football League (VBFL) and The Football Integration Development Association (FIDA) to include those with intellectual disabilities.

== See also ==
- List of Australian rules football leagues in Australia
- Australian rules football in Victoria
