= Victorian bias in the Australian Football League =

Victorian bias in the Australian Football League is an assertion by critics of the Australian Football League (AFL) that there is a bias or favouritism towards its Victorian-based clubs.

== Background ==
In 1982, the VFL relocated the South Melbourne Football Club to Sydney in New South Wales, with the following decade seeing the competition expand to have clubs in all five Australian mainland states. By 1997, there were ten clubs located in Victoria and six clubs located interstate.

After further expansion, the AFL consists of 18 clubs, eight of these being interstate clubs: the AFL will expand to 19 clubs in 2028 with the admission of Tasmania to the competition, giving a ninth interstate club. This imbalance of clubs inside and outside Victoria is often cited as the main, or even only, cause of any bias.

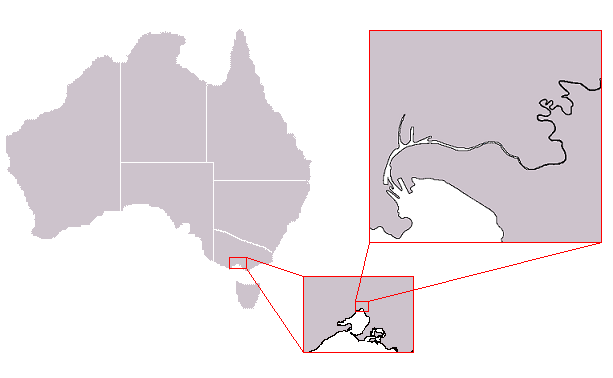

== Commonly cited examples of bias ==
=== Grand final location ===
Due to long-term contractual agreements with the Victorian Government and Melbourne Cricket Club, the AFL Grand Final is always played at the Melbourne Cricket Ground, even when no Victorian clubs compete. The current contract expires after 2059, with the most recent extension signed in 2018.

=== History, clubs and expansion ===
In the modern expanded Australian Football League, ten out of the eighteen clubs are Victorian, and two of the eight non-Victorian clubs present strong Victorian Football League identities, being the Sydney Swans (who relocated from South Melbourne in 1981) and the Brisbane Lions (who had merged with the Fitzroy Football Club).

Since the 1980s, the league has charged millions in new license fees, which were distributed to its primarily Victorian members to support their financial survival.

In contrast, it has been less forthcoming to non-Victorian clubs: 1987 expansion clubs the West Coast Eagles and Brisbane Bears had their $4 million license fees keep Fitzroy and Footscray trading, but both came to the brink of financial collapse within two seasons. In 1989, as both clubs were about to fold, their Victorian counterparts continued to trade. Neither the Eagles or Bears received league assistance: instead, the Bears were sold to Reuben Pelerman and the West Australian Football Commission bought up a significant stake in the Eagles to ensure their survival. In 2009, the league initially denied Port emergency funds when it faced a financial crisis: instead, it faced the threat of its license being revoked, and had to seek funds from the South Australian National Football League. In place of an emergency grant, the league brokered a deal that involved a loan from the SANFL and a buy-back of the club's AFL license.

Through their 1997 expansion, the Port Adelaide Football Club – with a long history wearing black and white as the Magpies in the SANFL – was required to modify its identity to protect the identity of an existing Victorian AFL club, Collingwood, also in black and white as the Magpies, prior to being granted entry to the league.

=== Fixturing bias ===
Victorian clubs enjoy favourable fixture conditions as they related to home grounds and travel. Included among this: Victorian teams play many more away games on their home grounds than the interstate teams do; non-Victorian clubs travel far greater distances during their careers; Victorian clubs generally have many more opportunities to play on the Melbourne Cricket Ground during the season, increasing their familiarity with it ahead of a potential grand final

Friday nights are regarded as the premier time slot for AFL fixtures as they are broadcast nationally on free to air, consequently generating the largest TV audiences of the week for the competition. Victorian clubs often dominate the Friday night fixture, as the result of broadcasters' preference for those matches to involve Melbourne teams, as that city is the largest market for the competition. Additionally, the league's regular marquee public holiday fixtures, such as the Anzac Day clash and King's Birthday match, are played between Victorian clubs.

=== Media ===
As a result of both the AFL administrative headquarters (AFL House) and the majority of the league's teams being located in Victoria, the majority of the competition's associated media is based in Victoria. As a result, it is thought that the media that covers the game has a bias towards Victorian clubs, and particularly Victorian based players with critics suggesting that players of Victorian clubs garner a higher profile compared to their non-Victorian counterparts.

=== Subsidisation ===
There have been claims that supporters of non-Victorian clubs pay higher ticket prices than those in Melbourne with the former effectively subsiding the latter.

=== Recruitment and AFL draft system ===
==== Disproportionate number of players recruited from Victoria ====
More than 60% of professional AFL players were recruited from Victoria in 2017, despite the state having only 40% of registered Australian players. This reflects stronger pathways, including the Victorian under-18s Talent League competition, from which a majority of players are recruited This is exacerbated by the "go home factor", a phenomenon which often sees star young players quickly requests trades back to their home states, leading to clubs being reluctant to risk high draft picks on players from other states – and although the "go home factor" sees players return to both Victorian and non-Victorian clubs, Victoria has seen disproportionate benefits from the phenomenon. Victorian clubs have also lobbied against draft concessions allowed to players from the northern academies, which aim to improve youth pathways in the developing New South Wales and Queensland markets.

==== Father–son rule ====
The AFL draft includes a father–son rule, allowing clubs priority access to recruit the sons of former players. During the first two decades of the non-Victorian clubs' existences, this rule applied unequally to Victorian and non-Victorian clubs: for Victorian clubs, it applied to sons whose fathers who had played 100 games for their club; for Western Australian clubs, it applied to sons whose fathers had played 150 games for one of four WAFL clubs; and for South Australian clubs, it applied to sons whose fathers had played 200 games for one of four or six SANFL clubs. This was supposed to create a roughly equitable outcome, but failed in practice, with very few South Australian or Western Australian sons ever recruited under the state-league eligibility rule.

=== Australian Football Hall of Fame ===
The Australian Football Hall of Fame has been criticised by football writers and historians for being heavily biased towards figures from Victoria. The initial selection committee was made up of 11 Victorians, one South Australian and one Western Australian, with the current selection committee being made up of six Victorians, two Western Australians and one South Australian. Of the 136 inaugural inductees into the Hall of Fame, 116 played substantial parts of their careers in Victoria, with eleven of the thirteen "Legends" from Victoria.

== See also ==
- New South Wales selection bias
