= AFL Grand Final location debate =

Event

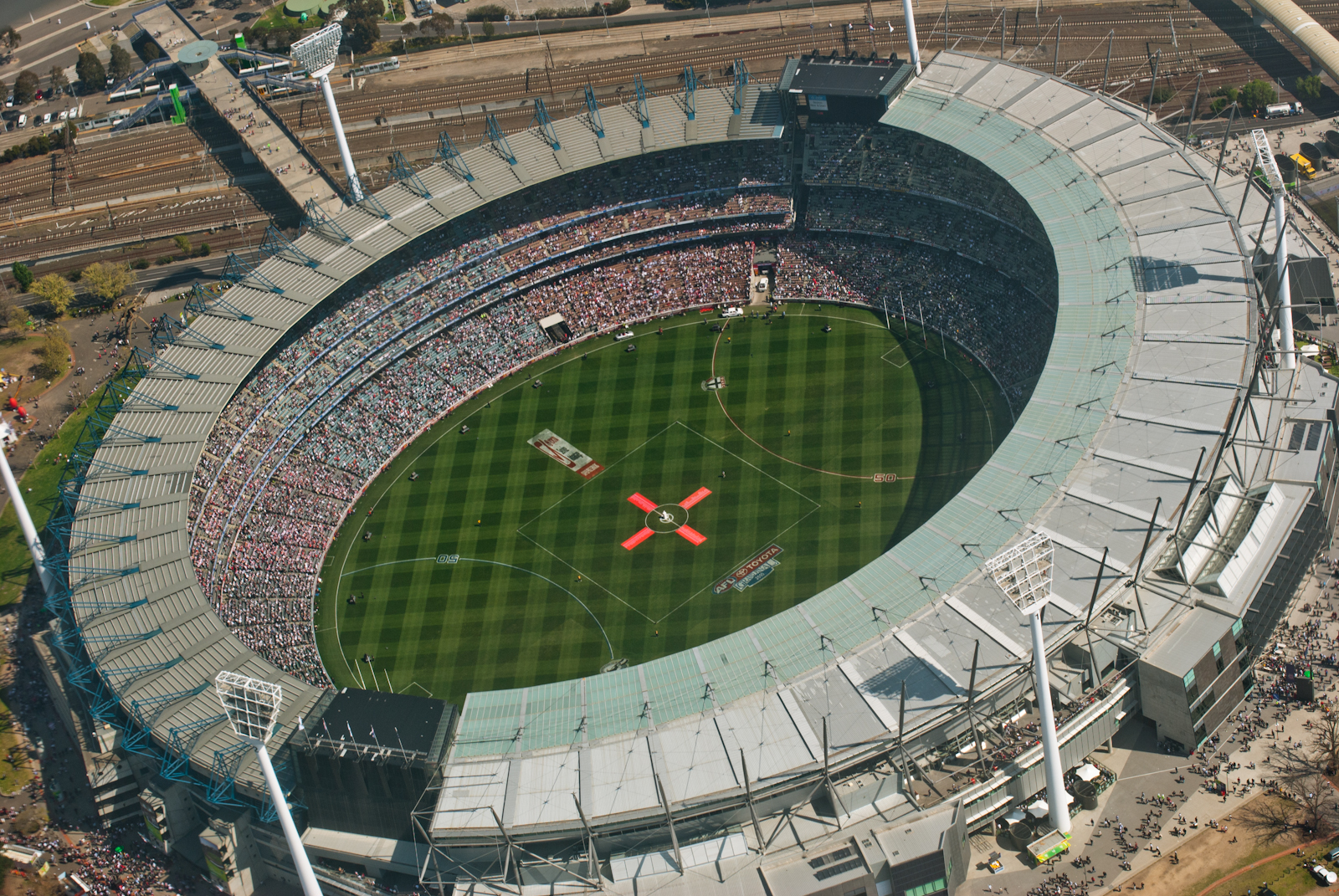
The 2010 AFL Grand Final at the Melbourne Cricket Ground.

The AFL Grand Final, which is the final premiership deciding match each season in the Australian Football League (AFL), has been played at the Melbourne Cricket Ground in Melbourne, Victoria, every year since 1902, except on seven occasions when the ground was unavailable or because of the COVID-19 pandemic in the case of the 2020 and 2021 Grand Finals, and it is presently contracted to be played there until 2059. Despite the long-term stability in its location, and its natural fit as the largest capacity stadium in both Melbourne and Australia, the ongoing use of the Melbourne Cricket Ground has been controversial throughout its history.

During the latter half of the 20th century, the location debate was driven by the Victorian Football League (or VFL, as the league was then known) seeking better commercial terms than it had at the Melbourne Cricket Ground from the Victorian Government and Melbourne Cricket Club – the ground's owners and operators respectively. This most notably resulted in an unsuccessful attempt to move the grand final to the VFL-owned VFL Park during the 1980s.

In the 1990s and into the 21st century, the VFL expanded interstate to become the AFL, while eight of the league's eighteen clubs have been based outside Victoria since 2012: a ninth non-Victorian club, Tasmania, will be admitted to the competition in 2028 as the league's 19th team. During this time, the location debate centred around the fairness of the grand final being staged permanently in Victoria after the league had spread nationally.

== Early history ==
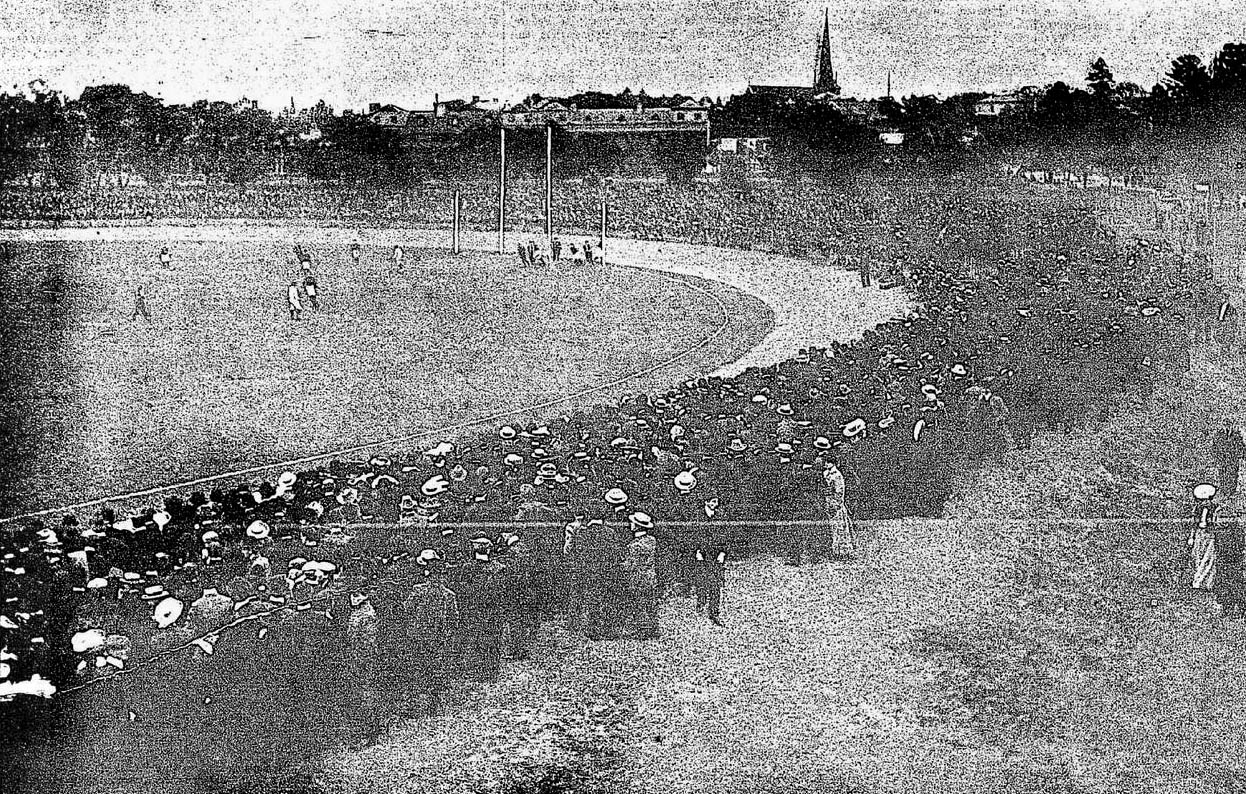
The Junction Oval staged the first VFL Grand Final and has played host to the match on three occasions in total.

Early VFL Grand Finals were played at different neutral venues chosen by the league's match committee a week in advance. The selection of the venue could depend on the condition of the surface, as many grounds were being prepared for the cricket season in September; and at this time, and football was not allowed on the Melbourne Cricket Ground after mid-August, as the Melbourne Cricket Club (MCC) sought to protect its surface for interstate and international cricket matches. The portion of the gate and privileges for cricket club members demanded by grounds landlords was considered by the league's match committee in its annual choice of venue. Of the first four grand finals, two were played at St Kilda, one at East Melbourne and one at South Melbourne.

In 1902, the ban on late-season football was lifted, and the grand final was played at the Melbourne Cricket Ground for the first time. The MCC was unwilling to grant any concessions to the league regarding its members – full members would gain free entry to the game and privileges for ladies' tickets – but the VFL nevertheless rewarded the MCC for its assistance in the staging of interstate games that year. The ground was thereafter used for all grand finals; and, after 1908, all finals.

Ever since the game moved to the ground, the agreement continued to allow MCC members to gain free entry to the Grand Final if they had paid the following cricket season's membership fee, and the high number of non-paying spectators long became a sticking point in negotiations between the VFL and MCC. In 1929, the MCC began paying the VFL lump sums for the right to host the finals and grand final each year – similar to an agreement it already had with the Victorian Cricket Association for exclusive rights to stage international cricket – and the lump sum partly covered the cost of its members' entry. This began at £300/yr, then was increased to £500/yr in 1931, as part of a ten-year deal between the VFL, the MCC and MCG Trust (the Victorian Government-appointed body which acts as the ground's owner) to keep the grand final, and other finals, at the ground until 1940; a new sixteen-year agreement, from 1941 until 1956, followed it. The ground was not used for the grand final between 1942 and 1945, as it was required to be used by the Australian military after its entry into the Pacific campaign of World War II.

== 1950s: the opportunity of the Olympics ==
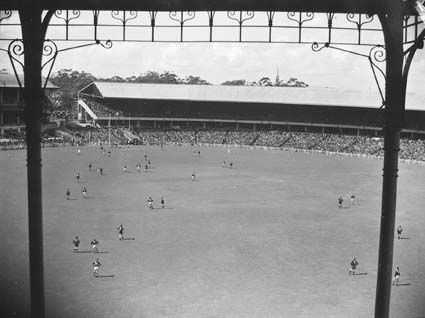
The VFL Grand Final returned to the Melbourne Cricket Ground in 1946 after a four year absence due to the venue being used for military purposes during World War II.

In the 1950s, the VFL continued to resent its reliance on the arrangement at the ground: the MCG Trust fixed admission prices, and the MCC continued to take a large portion of the gate, retain entry privileges for its members, and pay a £500/yr fee which had not increased since the 1930s.

In the early 1950s, the 1956 Melbourne Olympics offered the VFL its first opportunity to break from the deal. In early 1952, Carlton's stadium at Princes Park was selected to be upgraded to become the Olympic Stadium. Different plans for its capacity ranged from 70,000 to 125,000, compared with the Melbourne Cricket Ground's then-capacity of about 88,000. With less hostile landlords, the VFL was widely expected to relocate the finals, including the grand final, to Princes Park under more favourable terms after the Olympics and its current grand final deal ended in 1956.

However, in the 1952 Victorian state election, held in December 1952, the Labor Party's John Cain, Sr. replaced the Country Party's John McDonald as Premier of Victoria. Within two months, seeking cost reductions on the Olympics, plans for an all-new stadium at Carlton were abandoned in favour of a much lower cost redevelopment of the Melbourne Cricket Ground, which included the construction of the Olympic Stand and expansion of the ground's capacity to over 100,000. This left the Melbourne Cricket Ground as the only ground large enough to accommodate the Grand Final, giving the VFL little choice but to extend its arrangement at the ground.

The issue of the Melbourne Football Club having an unfair advantage by playing the grand final at the Melbourne Cricket Ground – which was its normal home ground – was noted after the club won five premierships in six years between 1955 and 1960. In 1961, one club delegate proposed in a league meeting that ground's goal posts be moved prior to each Melbourne finals match to temper its home ground advantage, an idea which drew wide laughter before being overwhelmingly voted down.

== 1970s–80s: VFL Park ==
The VFL's next strategy to sever its reliance on the Melbourne Cricket Ground arrangement was the construction of VFL Park (later known as Waverley Park) in south-eastern suburb of Mulgrave. Privately owned by the VFL, the land was purchased in 1962, and the new ground was opened for games in 1970. The first phase of its construction resulted had a capacity of 75,000; and the league started scheduling finals matches at the venue in 1972 – but not the grand final. Original designs for VFL Park allowed for eventual expansion to a capacity of 157,000.

The VFL put its plans to move the grand final to VFL Park into motion in August 1981: proposing a $14 million upgrade to increase its capacity to 104,500, and announcing that it would be ready for the 1984 VFL Grand Final. However, the Victorian Government, now under premier John Cain, Jr., blocked the upgrade. Initially, it was blocked on the basis that the higher crowd required improved public facilities and transport in the surrounding area, which the VFL agreed to fund; but by the end of 1982, the government stated openly that it preferred and was committed to keeping the grand final at Melbourne Cricket Ground, and thus rejected VFL Park expansion plans. This put the VFL and government in open conflict.

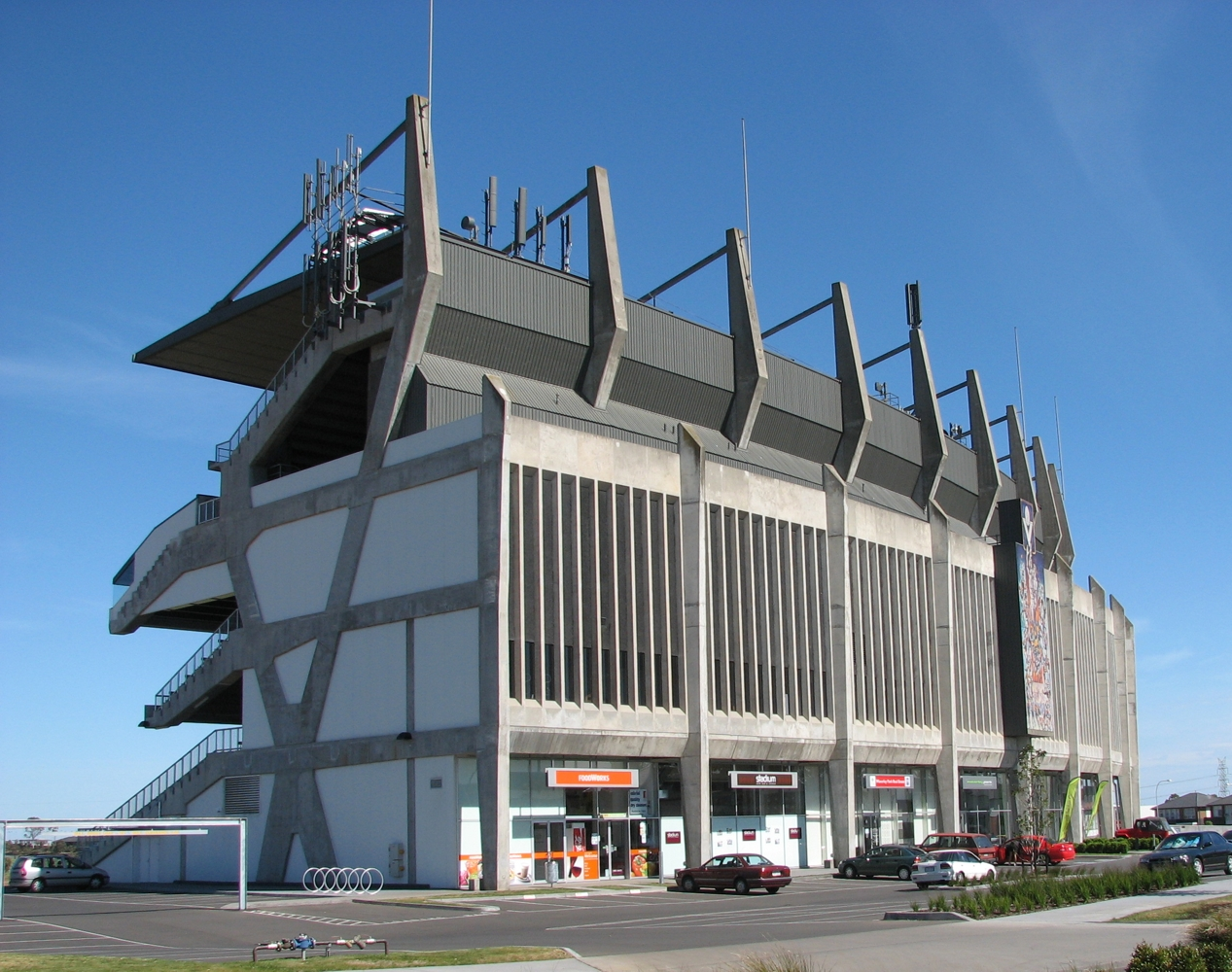
Once the VFL's long-term plan for the grand final, the disused K. G. Luke Grandstand is all that remains of spectator facilities at VFL Park.

By the 1980s, the VFL's motivation to stage the game at VFL Park was not simply a matter of finding a better commercial deal: it was a matter of financial survival. Rising costs, including player payments, were sending more than half of the league's clubs broke; South Melbourne was in the process of relocating to Sydney due to its financial troubles, and several other clubs (including Fitzroy, Footscray and Richmond) were soon to be fighting for their futures. Staging the grand final at VFL Park was worth an estimated $3 million per year to the VFL and its clubs, as it could keep a higher proportion of the gate, and use grand final entry as an incentive to sell VFL Park memberships.

Losing the grand final would have been a similar financial negative for the MCC and Victorian government. Both had invested heavily in the ageing facilities at the Melbourne Cricket Ground, and grand final entry was also a noted incentive for MCC memberships. Surveys of VFL fans generally favoured the game remaining at the centrally located Melbourne Cricket Ground, rather than VFL Park which was relatively distant in the south-eastern suburbs of Melbourne.

Negotiations took place throughout 1982 and 1983. The Victorian government committed to a $15 million upgrade of the Melbourne Cricket Ground, including light towers for night football and cricket. The VFL gave up on its grand expansion plans, and sought a smaller $5 million upgrade to bring the capacity to 84,000; but the Cain Jr. government continued to reject any upgrade plans, and even threatened to pass legislation requiring the grand final be played at the Melbourne Cricket Ground.

By late 1983, the parties began negotiating for a new arrangement at the Melbourne Cricket Ground. The VFL sought to lease the entire ground for finals, with its 28,000 VFL Park full members granted exclusive use of MCC members' facilities. The MCC executive counteroffered to waive the $250,000 lease fee, and set aside the members' facilities and the Olympic Stand for shared use by MCC and VFL Park members. The counteroffer was rejected in a vote of the MCC members by a substantial 74% majority; but, the government, via the MCG Trust, was able to use its powers to compel the MCC to accept the deal. The deal was done in early 1984, and plans to move the 1984 Grand Final to VFL Park were abandoned. For the VFL, this outcome was still a $2.4 million per year improvement on the previous arrangement, as it still enabled the league to use grand final entry as an incentive for the purchase of VFL Park memberships.

The MCC and VFL maintained an uneasy relationship through the balance of the 1980s. Then, in 1988, concrete cancer was found in the Melbourne Cricket Ground's ageing Southern Stand. The MCC could not afford to completely rebuild it, so the VFL and MCC agreed to a joint funding arrangement. The brand new Great Southern Stand (later known as the Shane Warne Stand), with facilities befitting a paid membership, was completed in 1992, and half of it was reserved for exclusive use of VFL members during the football season; MCC members then regained exclusive use of their traditional members' facilities. With a direct financial stake in the Melbourne Cricket Ground, the VFL no longer had an incentive to move the grand final from the ground, permanently ending the grand final location debate as it related to VFL Park.

== 1990s to today: national expansion ==
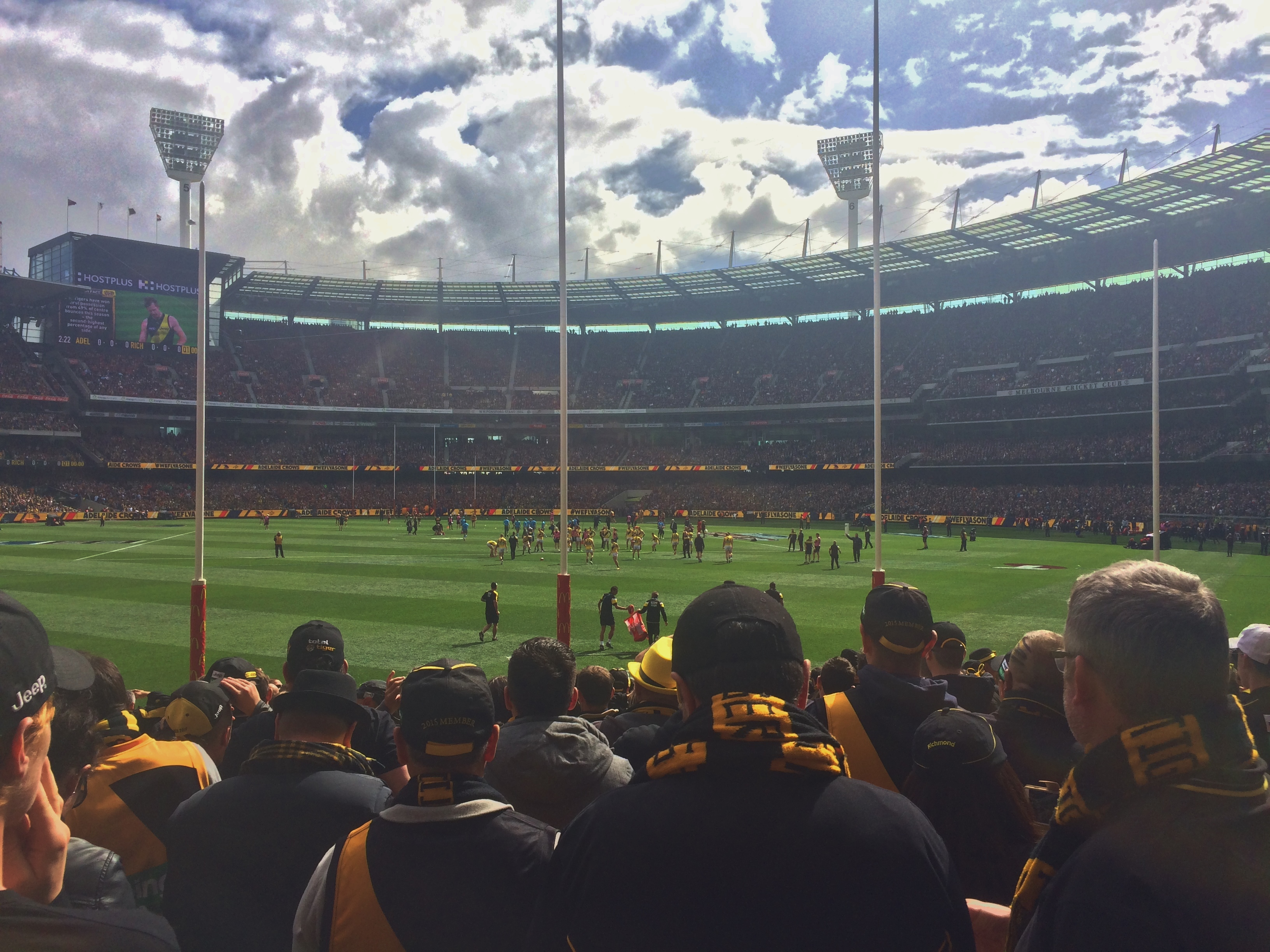
In the 21st century, the VFL/AFL Grand Final location debate has revolved around whether or not Victoria should always host the premiership deciding match of the Australian Football League.

In 2003, a long-term deal was initially locked in to secure the Melbourne Cricket Ground for the grand final every year until 2032. This was extended in 2009 to 2037, then in 2018 to 2057, with compensatory extensions to 2058 and 2059 after the COVID-19 pandemic forced the 2020 and 2021 matches out of the venue. As for all Grand Final venue agreements, they were three-party deals among the VFL/AFL, MCC and the Victorian government's MCG Trust.

When the initial long-term deals were put in place, the former Victorian Football League was in the process of expanding interstate, and was renamed the Australian Football League in 1990: since the admission of Greater Western Sydney in 2012, eight of the league's eighteen clubs have been non-Victorian, and a ninth non-Victorian club, Tasmania, will be admitted to the competition in 2028 as the league's 19th club.

The non-Victorian clubs have called into question the inherent fairness of the long-term Melbourne Cricket Ground deal, as it permanently gives the Victorian clubs a home-state advantage in finals and gives non-Victorian clubs a travel cost burden for the grand final. It is argued that the game should be bid for or rotated among all of the major venues every year, or alternatively, that the Melbourne Cricket Ground remain the main venue with the game shared around periodically, such as once every four to ten years.

=== Key arguments ===
Points of contention over where the AFL Grand Final is hosted are often focused on a few key themes. Opinions on whether the AFL Grand Final should remain in Victoria or be shared around Australia tend to be partisan based on whether the individual is located in Victoria or another state.

Growing the code

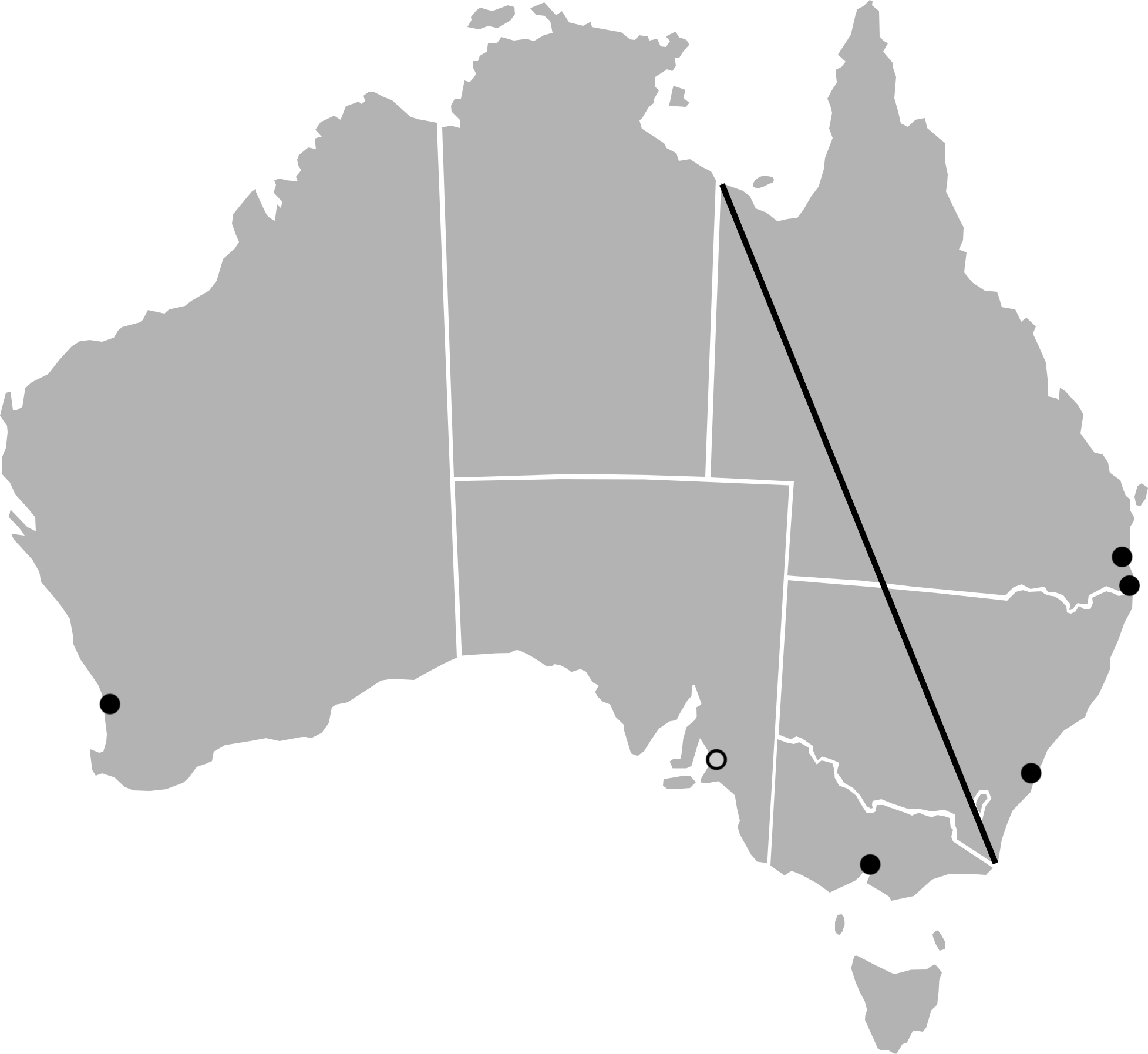
The "Barassi Line", as proposed by Ian Turner in 1978. The line divides the regions where Australian rules football (southwest) and rugby league (northeast) are the most popular football codes. It is argued that by hosting the AFL Grand Final, the marquee event of Australian rules football, to the north of the Barassi Line will help grow the game.

Another common argument in recent times regarding the rotation of the AFL Grand Final venue is for the sake of growing the game in the non-traditional markets of Australian rules football. Many football writers argue that the AFL cannot claim to be a full national competition until the championship deciding match is shared around the country regularly. Michelangelo Rucci has argued that hosting rights of the AFL Grand Final should feature a bidding process, stating that "there is far more to gain than lose from a national bidding battle to host the AFL grand final".

Incentivise infrastructure investment

It is argued that by moving the AFL Grand Final around Australia it will give an incentive to state governments to invest money into Australian rules football stadia. Hosting the grand final is a known incentive for stadium development, as each extension of the long-standing Melbourne Cricket Ground deal has been part of negotiations with the Victorian government for gaining government funding for that ground's redevelopments.

Economics

One potential arrangement if the match were to be moved from the Melbourne Cricket Ground would be for competitive bidding among ground owners, typically state governments, to secure the rights to stage it. This could become a commercially favourable option for the league as it could encourage a direct cash injection to the league by bidders, who would do so to secure the game's benefit to their local economies, both from tourism and local spending. Economists estimated the net benefit to the Victorian economy of hosting the 2015 Grand Final was $125 million.

In 2018, when the Victorian government announced the $500 million investment in the Melbourne Cricket Ground and other Victorian football infrastructure which triggered the extension of the grand final contract to 2057, it acknowledged that it was motivated by a desire to protect the economic windfall Victoria derives from hosting the grand final – noting the strong investment in stadiums by all of the other mainland states and the need to remain competitive with them.

In 2020, when a bidding auction for the grand final took place because the Melbourne Cricket Ground was unavailable due to the COVID-19 pandemic, the Western Australian government offered the AFL $35 million as part of its bid to host the AFL Grand Final at Perth Stadium. This compares to the $12.5 million dollars in benefits which the Victorian government is estimated to deliver to the AFL each year as part of its deal to host the game until 2059.

Fairness

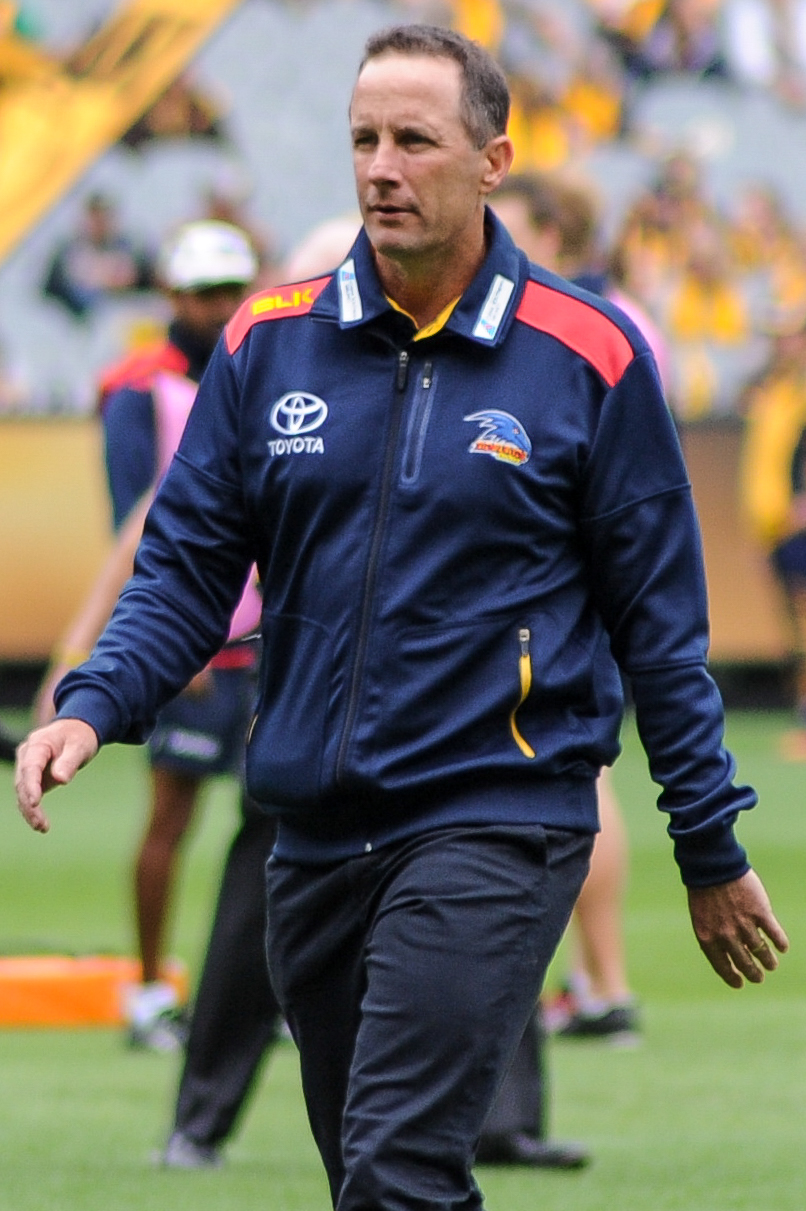
Don Pyke has formally raised concerns about the fairness of the MCG Grand Final arrangement.

A key argument in regards to fairness centres on the fact that non-Victorian clubs must always carry the travel burden of the grand final, and that MCG tenant clubs in particular have the benefit of hosting the premiership decider at their home ground, some playing up to seventeen games on the ground each year, making the arrangement the biggest handicap against non-Victorian sides being able to win the premiership. After the 2017 AFL Grand Final, where the minor premiers Adelaide played Richmond on the latter's home ground, the MCG, Adelaide coach Don Pyke raised his concern with the AFL Coaches Association about the unfairness of the current arrangement.

As of 2025, ten grand finals have been played between a higher-ranked non-Victorian team and a lower-ranked Victorian team in Victoria; the non-Victorian clubs have won five of those. The AFL acknowledged the home state imbalance in its 2018 contract renegotiation by including some balancing provisions: that interstate clubs be scheduled to play at least two home-and-away games at the venue annually (although this rule has not been consistently enforced), be granted training access to the ground during the year, and be chartered flights during grand final week.

Some observers advocate that the grand final should be held on the home ground of the higher ranked team, seen as the overall fairest option which allows teams to earn the benefit of home ground advantage through on-field performances over the season. This was outright ruled out by league CEO Gillon McLachlan in 2020, stating that the preparation for the grand final – including all of the spectator and corporate events which accompany it and contribute significantly to both the tradition and revenue of the game respectively – require months or years of planning, making it both impractical and onerously expensive to leave the venue undecided until after the preliminary final weekend.

Capacity

The Melbourne Cricket Ground remains the highest capacity stadium in Australia, and thus provides the greatest opportunity for spectators to attend. This remains a strong argument in favour of the current arrangement, and part of the AFL's stated model is to maximise the game's in-person attendance. A critique of this view is that, from the pure perspective of its audience numbers, the AFL Grand Final is primarily a television event. But there is also an economic argument in favour of the high capacity, which notes that the ability to sell corporate grand final ticket packages, which are most plentiful at the large venue, is a significant revenue earner for both the league and the clubs, and that under present business models this revenue is a critical part of the match's overall cash flow; the AFL made a $19 million profit on the 2016 grand final alone, mostly from corporate packages.

Members of the Melbourne Cricket Club have guaranteed access to 23,000 out of 100,024 seats at the Melbourne Cricket Ground for every AFL Grand Final.

Affordability and accessibility

In addition to non-Victorian clubs bearing the travel burden of finals, a higher cost to attend the match is always borne by non-Victorian spectators than Victorian spectators, due to airfares and accommodation. This is particularly relevant for fans who live in Perth, with return flights during Grand Final weekend exceeding $1,000.

Tradition

Other than commercial interests and the balancing of home-state advantage, other arguments put forward in the debate include. The long history and tradition associated with the game favour continuing to schedule at the traditional venue– although it is counter-argued that this represents only the Victorian perspective view of their grand final's traditions, especially considering that the Australian rules football heartland states of South Australia and Western Australia held their own Grand Finals, which at the time were of an equal level of seniority to the VFL, before those states fielded teams in the national competition.

== Potential venues ==
Below are the venues that have been put forward as locations for an AFL Grand Final. These venues are usually the largest Australian rules football stadiums in each state. During the bidding process for the pandemic-affected 2020 AFL Grand Final, The Gabba, Adelaide Oval, Perth Stadium and Stadium Australia were all considered. In the past Waverley Park was considered a long term venue for the VFL and AFL Grand Final with the venue hosting the game for the 1991 AFL Grand Final.

Melbourne Cricket Ground	Stadium Australia	Perth Stadium	Adelaide Oval
Melbourne, Victoria	Sydney, New South Wales	Perth, Western Australia	Adelaide, South Australia
Capacity: 100,024	Capacity: 82,500	Capacity: 60,223	Capacity: 53,583
Waverley Park	AFL Grand Final location debate is located in Australia		The Gabba
Mulgrave, Victoria	AFL Grand Final location debate is located in Australia		Brisbane, Queensland
Capacity: 78,000	AFL Grand Final location debate is located in Australia		Capacity: 42,000

== Grand finals away from the Melbourne Cricket Ground ==
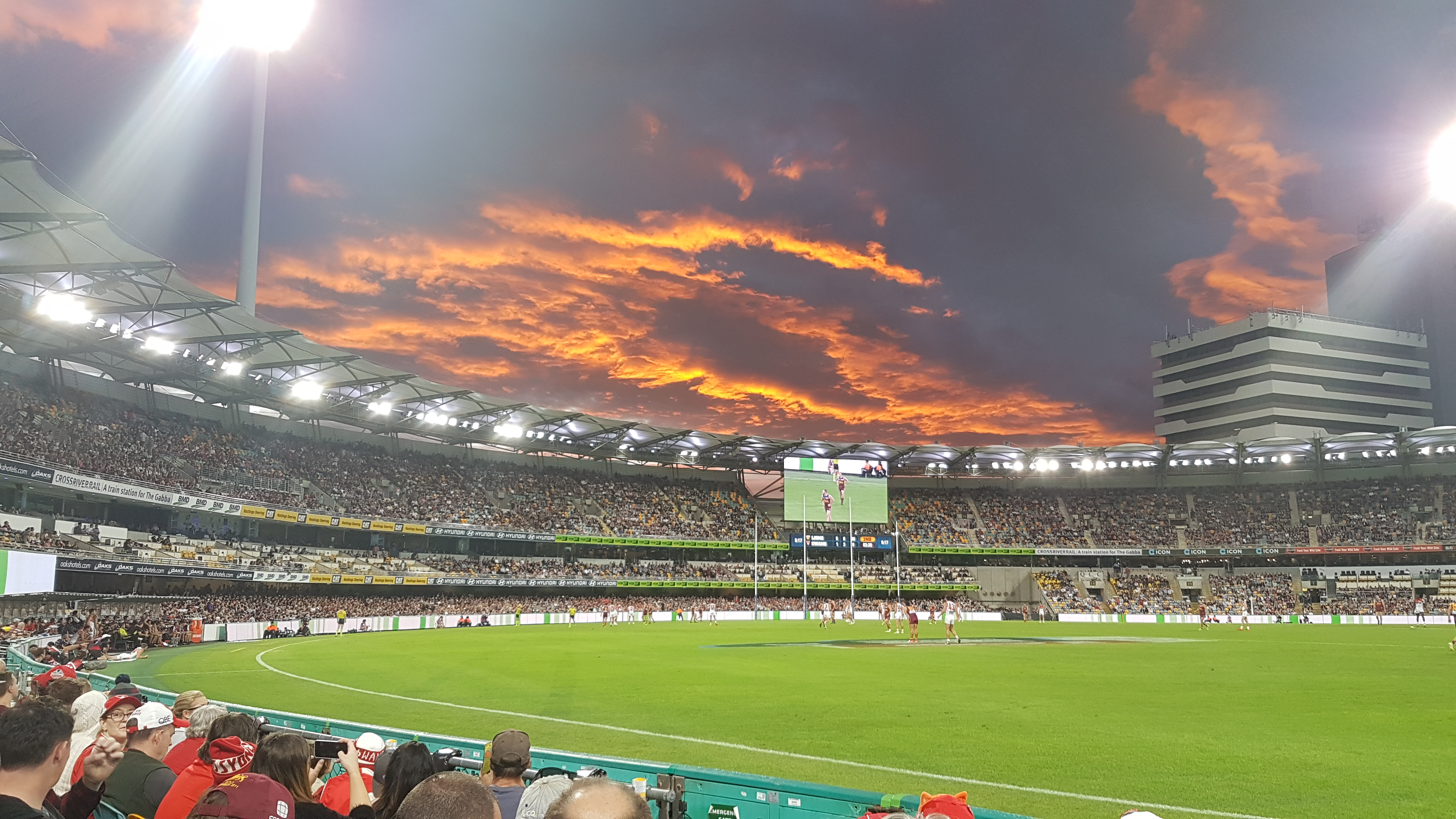
Brisbane's Gabba was selected over several non-Victorian stadiums to host the pandemic-affected 2020 Grand Final.

The VFL/AFL Grand Final has been held at a ground other than the Melbourne Cricket Ground on eleven occasions.

The first four VFL Grand Finals were held at Junction Oval (1898 and 1899), the East Melbourne Cricket Ground (1900) and the Lake Oval (1901).

Since the Grand Final was first played at the Melbourne Cricket Ground in 1902, seven Grand Finals have been played away from the venue due to either unavailability or capacity restriction:

- The Melbourne Cricket Ground was requisitioned for military use from 1942 to 1945, resulting in the use of Princes Park (1942, 1943 and 1945) and the Junction Oval (1944).
- The reconstruction of the Southern Stand in 1991 reduced the ground's capacity by half, resulting in the use of Waverley Park.
- The COVID-19 pandemic resulted in restrictions on interstate travel and public gatherings in Victoria during the finals in both 2020 and 2021, resulting in the use of the Gabba in Brisbane (2020) and Optus Stadium in Perth (2021).

=== VFL/AFL Grand Finals not held at the MCG ===
	Grand Final	Premiers	Runners-up	Score	Venue	Attendance	Date
1	1898	Fitzroy	Essendon	5.8 (38) d. 3.5 (23)	Junction Oval	16,538	24 September 1898
2	1899	Fitzroy	South Melbourne	3.9 (27) d. 3.8 (26)	Junction Oval	4,823	16 September 1899
3	1900	Melbourne	Fitzroy	4.10 (34) d. 3.12 (30)	East Melbourne Cricket Ground	20,181	22 September 1900
4	1901	Essendon	Collingwood	6.7 (43) d. 2.4 (16)	Lake Oval	30,031	7 September 1901
5	1942	Essendon	Richmond	19.18 (132) d. 11.13 (79)	Princes Park	49,000	19 September 1942
6	1943	Richmond	Essendon	12.14 (86) d. 11.15 (81)	Princes Park	42,100	25 September 1943
7	1944	Fitzroy	Richmond	9.12 (66) d. 7.9 (51)	Junction Oval	43,000	30 September 1944
8	1945	Carlton	South Melbourne	15.13 (103) d. 10.15 (75)	Princes Park	62,986	29 September 1945
9	1991	Hawthorn	West Coast	20.19 (139) d. 13.8 (86)	VFL Park	75,230	28 September 1991
10	2020	Richmond	Geelong	12.9 (81) d. 7.8 (50)	The Gabba	29,707	24 October 2020
11	2021	Melbourne	Western Bulldogs	21.14 (140) d.10.6 (66)	Optus Stadium	61,118	25 September 2021
