= Outram =

Outram may refer to:

== Places ==
- Outram, Nova Scotia, an unincorporated district in Canada
- Outram, Saskatchewan, a community in Canada
- Outram, New Zealand, a small town in Otago
- Outram, Singapore, a district in central Singapore
- Outram Ghat, in Kolkata, India
- Outram Island, one of the Andaman Islands, India
- Outram Street, Perth, Australia

== People ==
- Benjamin Outram (1764–1805), English civil engineer
- Benjamin Fonseca Outram (1774–1856), English naval surgeon
- Gary Outram (born 1976), South African cricketer
- George Outram (1805–1856), Scottish humorous poet
- James Outram (mountaineer) (1864–1925), British mountaineer
- Sir James Outram, 1st Baronet (1803–1863), British Indian military and political leader
- Jean Outram (1925–2023), maiden name of Jean Argles, British cryptographer
- John Outram (born 1934), British architect
- Martin Outram, English violist
- Percy Outram (1903–1981), Australian rules footballer
- Richard Outram (1930–2005), Canadian poet
- Roy Outram (1901–1987), Australian rules footballer
- Outram Bangs (1863–1932), American zoologist

== Other uses ==
- Outram Secondary School, in Singapore
- 123rd Outram's Rifles, a regiment of the British Indian Army
