= Frank Hanna =

Frank Hanna may refer to:

- Frank Hanna (politician) (1914–1987), Irish politician
- Frank Hanna III (born 1960s), American entrepreneur and merchant banker
- Frank Hanna (footballer, born 1893) (1893–1967), Australian rules footballer for the Carlton Football Club
- Frank Hanna (footballer, born 1924) (1924–2010), Australian rules footballer for the Melbourne Football Club

== See also ==
- Frank Hannah (born 1971), Scottish filmmaker
