= List of shipwrecks in January 1872 =

The list of shipwrecks in January 1872 includes ships sunk, foundered, grounded, or otherwise lost during January 1872.

== 1 January ==
List of shipwrecks: 1 January 1872
| Ship | State | Description |
|---|---|---|
| Agincourt | United Kingdom | The ship ran aground 4.5 nautical miles (8.3 km) off the Spurn Lightship ( Trinity House). She was on a voyage from Sunderland, County Durham to Shanghai, China. She was refloated and taken in to the River Tyne in a leaky condition with the assistance of a tug. |
| Blue | Canada | The barque was wrecked on the Brail Sand, in the North Sea. Her crew were rescued by a fishing boat. |
| Director | United Kingdom | The ship ran aground on the Cork Sand, in the North Sea off the coast of Essex. She was on a voyage from London to Mistley, Essex. She was refloated and taken in to Harwich, Essex in a derelict condition. |
| Kingfisher | United Kingdom | The barque ran aground on the Foreness Rock, Margate, Kent. She was on a voyage from Newcastle upon Tyne, Northumberland to Cherbourg, Manche, France. She was refloated and taken in to Margate. |
| Margaret Pollock | United Kingdom | The full-rigged ship was driven ashore at Rosneath Point, Argyllshire. She was refloated and taken in to Greenock, Renfrewshire. |
| Marguerite | France | The brig was driven ashore at Famagusta, Cyprus. |
| Peace | United Kingdom | The ship was driven ashore at Blakeney, Norfolk. She was on a voyage from Blyth, Northumberland to London. She was refloated and taken in to Blakeney. |
| Seaman | United Kingdom | The ship was driven ashore on Gardiners Island, New York, United States. She was on a voyage from Liverpool to Newhaven, Connecticut. She was refloated on 5 January and towed in to Newhaven. |
| Solferino | Flag unknown | The ship was driven ashore and wrecked at Port-la-Nouvelle, Aude, France with the loss of three of her crew. |
| Stroch | Flag unknown | The ship was driven ashore at Port-la-Nouvelle. |
| Sussex | United Kingdom | The full-rigged ship was wrecked at Port Philip Heads, Victoria. |
| Sybil | United Kingdom | The schooner was driven ashore and wrecked at Gorleston, Suffolk. Her crew were rescued by the Gorleston Lifeboat. She was on a voyage from Hartlepool, County Durham to Great Yarmouth, Norfolk. |
| Thomas and Elizabeth | United Kingdom | The ship was driven ashore and sank at "Pilroot", County Antrim. |
| Volonte de Dieu | France | The ship was driven ashore and wrecked at Port-la-Novelle. |

== 2 January ==
List of shipwrecks: 2 January 1872
| Ship | State | Description |
|---|---|---|
| Anonyma | United Kingdom | The ship was sighted in the Atlantic Ocean whilst on a voyage from Calcutta, India to New York, United States. No further trace, presumed foundered with the loss of all hands. |
| Bessie North | United Kingdom | The ship was driven ashore. She was on a voyage from Beaumaris, Anglesey to New Orleans, Louisiana, United States. She was refloated and take in the Greenock, Renfrewshire in a leaky condition. |
| Grocer | United Kingdom | The schooner sank off Dunwich, Suffolk with the loss of at least one of her crew. |
| Johnny | Sweden | The ship was wrecked near Westervik. She was on a voyage from London, United Kingdom to Westervik. |
| Koster | Germany | The schooner sank off the mouth of the Oste. Her crew survived. She was on a voyage from Cephalonia, Greece to Hamburg. |
| Laura | United Kingdom | The barque was abandoned in the North Sea. Her crew were rescued by the steamship Jutland (United Kingdom). Laura was on a voyage from the Nieuwe Diep to Sunderland, County Durham. |
| Louisa Ann Fanny | United Kingdom | The steamship was run into at Gothenburg, Sweden by the steamship Carl XV (Sweden) and sank at the stern. |
| Oscar | Norway | The ship was driven ashore near Ålesund. She was on a voyage from Lisbon, Portugal to Trondheim. |
| Robin | United Kingdom | The Mersey Flat sank off the Hilbre Islands, Cheshire. Her crew were rescued. |
| Seraphina | United Kingdom | The ship ran aground on the Cutler Sand, in the North Sea off the coast of Suffolk. She was on a voyage from Sunderland, County Durham to London. She was refloated and beached at Harwich, Essex. |
| Union | United Kingdom | The schooner was driven ashore on Flotta, Orkney Islands. Her three crew were rescued. She was on a voyage from Portgordon, Moray to Sunderland. |
| Unnamed | Flag unknown | The ship was driven ashore on Great Cumbrae, Argyllshire, United Kingdom. |
| Unnamed | Flag unknown | The barque ran aground on the Kentish Knock. |
| Eight unnamed vessels | (Ottoman Empire) Egypt | The lighters sank at Alexandria. Two of them were raised. |

== 3 January ==
List of shipwrecks: 3 January 1872
| Ship | State | Description |
|---|---|---|
| Accord | United Kingdom | The ship ran aground on the Colbert Sand. She was on a voyage from Sunderland, County Durham to Southampton, Hampshire. She was refloated and put in to Dover, Kent in a leaky condition. |
| Dannevirke | Germany | The ship was wrecked at Grimstad, Norway. She was on a voyage from Kiel to Londonderry, United Kingdom. |
| True Blue | United Kingdom | The ship was driven ashore in the River Thames at Tilbury, Essex. She was on a voyage from Gravesend, Kent to Algoa Bay. She was refloated and resumed her voyage. |

== 4 January ==
List of shipwrecks: 4 January 1872
| Ship | State | Description |
|---|---|---|
| Aurora | Denmark | The schooner was driven ashore on Læsø. She was on a voyage from Kjerteminde to Antwerp, Belgium. She was later refloated and towed in to Fredrikshavn, Denmark. |
| Clarissa | United Kingdom | The schooner ran aground off Southend, Essex. She was on a voyage from London to Seaham, County Durham. |
| Cygnet | United Kingdom | The schooner was driven ashore at Maryport, Cumberland. Her three crew were rescued by the Maryport Lifeboat. She was on a voyage from Port Dinorwic, Caernarfonshire to Workington, Cumberland. |
| Fire Queen | United Kingdom | The ship ran aground on the Goodwin Sands, Kent. She was on a voyage from London to Sydney, New South Wales. |
| Flinn | United Kingdom | The ship ran aground on Scroby Sands, Norfolk. She was on a voyage from Seaham to Rochester, Kent. She was refloated and taken in to Great Yarmouth, Norfolk in a leaky condition. |
| James Ewing | United Kingdom | The schooner was driven ashore at Harrington, Cumberland. She was refloated and taken in to Harrington. |
| Rough Diamond | Canada | The schooner was driven ashore near Newburyport, Massachusetts, United States. Her crew survived. She was on a voyage from Newhaven, Connecticut, United States to Saint John, New Brunswick. |
| Spirit of the Dawn | United Kingdom | The ship was wrecked near Tŷ Croes, Anglesey with the loss of six of her twelve crew. She was on a voyage from Liverpool, Lancashire to San Francisco, California, United States. She was refloated in mid-March and taken in to Rhosneigr. |

== 5 January ==
List of shipwrecks: 5 January 1872
| Ship | State | Description |
|---|---|---|
| Dumfries | United Kingdom | The steamship was driven ashore at Ayr. She was on a voyage from Liverpool, Lancashire to Ayr. |
| Majesty | United Kingdom | The ship, a polacca or a smack. foundered in Barnstaple Bay. Her three crew were rescued by the Appledore Lifeboat Bramads of Backs ( Royal National Lifeboat Institution). |
| Olagaival, or Olaquwel | Spain | The barque was wrecked on the Heleda Shoal, off Hong Kong. Her crew were rescued by Sophie, Koningen der Nederlanden. The barque was on a voyage from Liverpool, Lancashire, United Kingdom to Manila, Spanish East Indies. |
| Silesia | Germany | The Hammonia-class ocean liner ran aground at Dartmouth, Nova Scotia. She was on a voyage from New York, United States to Hamburg. She was refloated and completed her voyage. |
| Star of England | United Kingdom | The ship caught fire at Callao, Peru and was scuttled. She was refloated on 8 January. |

== 6 January ==
List of shipwrecks: 6 January 1872
| Ship | State | Description |
|---|---|---|
| R. E. A. Parkinson | United Kingdom | The schooner was severely damaged by fire at Barrow-in-Furness, Lancashire. |

== 7 January ==
List of shipwrecks: 7 January 1872
| Ship | State | Description |
|---|---|---|
| Duke of Sutherland | United Kingdom | The fishing smack collided with the fishing smack Devon (United Kingdom) and sank in the North Sea. Her crew were rescued by Devon. |
| Ebenezer | United Kingdom | The ship was driven ashore in the Southwest Pass. She was on a voyage from Ardrossan, Ayrshire to New Orleans, Louisiana, United States. She was refloated on 15 January and towed in to New Orleans. |
| Shamrock | United States | The brig was driven ashore at Genoa, Italy. Her crew were rescued. She was on a voyage from New York to Genoa. |
| Vancouver | United Kingdom | The ship caught fire at New Orleans, Louisiana, United States. |

== 8 January ==
List of shipwrecks: 8 January 1872
| Ship | State | Description |
|---|---|---|
| John Clemens | United Kingdom | The schooner foundered in the Firth of Forth off the Bass Rock. Her crew were rescued. |
| Lady Gwendolin | United Kingdom | The barque was wrecked on the Haaks Bank, in the North Sea off the Dutch coast. Her crew were rescued. She was on a voyage from Iquique, Chile to Hamburg, Germany. |
| Minnie Breslauer | United Kingdom | The freighter ran aground on a reef 1 mile off Horseshoe Bay, Bermuda and sank after trying to back off the reef. |

== 9 January ==
List of shipwrecks: 9 January 1872
| Ship | State | Description |
|---|---|---|
| Christian | Sweden | The ship was driven ashore at Blakeney, Norfolk, United Kingdom. She was on a voyage from Sunderland, County Durham, United Kingdom to Barcelona, Spain. |
| Mary | United Kingdom | The ship was driven ashore at "Napara" or "Napia", in the Dardanelles. She was on a voyage from Liverpool, Lancashire to Constantinople, Ottoman Empire. Mary was refloated on 12 January and resumed her voyage following temporary repairs. |

== 10 January ==
List of shipwrecks: 10 January 1872
| Ship | State | Description |
|---|---|---|
| Cabinet | United Kingdom | The barque was driven ashore and wrecked near The Manacles, Cornwall. She was on a voyage from Odesa, Russia to Newry, County Antrim. Her five crew had been taken off by the Porthoustock Lifeboat Mary Ann Storey ( Royal National Lifeboat Institution). |
| Dublin | United Kingdom | The Thames barge collided with the steamship Maasstroom (Netherlands) and sank in the River Thames at Blackwall, Middlesex. |
| Flora | Austria-Hungary | The barque was driven ashore and wrecked in Ballycroneen Bay. She was on a voyage from Alexandria, Egypt to Queenstown, County Cork, United Kingdom. |
| John & Mary | United Kingdom | The schooner collided with a steamship and was beached on the Whitehouse Bank, in the Belfast Lough. She was on a voyage from Maryport, Cumberland to Belfast, County Antrim. |
| Lilly | United Kingdom | The schooner ran aground on the Kish Bank, in the Irish Sea. Her six crew got aboard the Kish Lightship ( Trinity House). |
| Madre Mimbelli | France | The ship was run down and sunk at Toulon, Var by L'Hermite (French Navy). Her crew were rescued. |
| Princess Royal | United Kingdom | The barque ran aground off Thorpeness, Suffolk. She was on a voyage from South Shields, County Durham to London. She was refloated and resumed her voyage. |
| Walmea | New South Wales | The steamship was wrecked at the mouth of the Richmond River. |
| Unnamed | United Kingdom | The smack sank off the Horse Isle, in the Firth of Clyde. Her crew were rescued. |

== 11 January ==
List of shipwrecks: 11 January 1872
| Ship | State | Description |
|---|---|---|
| Ada | United Kingdom | The steamship ran into the steamship Sappho (United Kingdom) and sank in the North Sea off the mouth of the Humber. Her twenty crew were rescued. Ada was on a voyage from Brăila, Ottoman Empire to Hull, Yorkshire. |
| Alice | United Kingdom | The steamship sprang a leak and sank at Gateshead, County Durham. |
| Catherine McIver | United Kingdom | The schooner was driven ashore at Lowestoft, Suffolk. She was on a voyage from Arbroath, Forfarshire to London. She was refloated and taken in to Lowestoft. |
| Cheviot | United Kingdom | The schooner was driven ashore at Lindisfarne, Northumberland. She was on a voyage from Aberdeen to South Shields, County Durham. She was refloated and taken in to Lindisfarne. |
| Confiance | France | The ship was driven ashore and sank at Havre de Grâce, Seine-Inférieure. Her crew were rescued. |
| Diana | United Kingdom | The ship ran aground on the Longsand, in the North Sea off the coast of Essex. She was on a voyage from South Shields to Cádiz, Spain. She was refloated with assistance from the smack Increase (United Kingdom)n and assisted in to Harwich, Essex in a leaky condition. |
| Elliott | United Kingdom | The brig was abandoned in Robin Hoods Bay. She was on a voyage from Honfleur, Manche, France to Arbroath, Forfarshire. She came ashore at Ness Point but was refloated on 13 January with assistance from the paddle tug Esk (United Kingdom). She consequently sank. Those on board were rescued by cobles. |
| Golden Eagle | United Kingdom | The ship was abandoned in the Atlantic Ocean. Her crew were rescued. She was on a voyage from Sombrero, Anguilla to Gloucester. |
| Hazard | United Kingdom | The steamship was driven ashore and wrecked at Port Eynon, Glamorgan. Her crew were rescued. She was on a voyage from Rouen, Seine-Inférieure, France to Swansea, Glamorgan. |
| Jane Fish | United States | The ship ran aground on the Kentish Knock. She was on a voyage from Brouwershaven, Zeeland, Netherlands to Cardiff, Glamorgan, United Kingdom. Jane Fish was refloated but then ran aground on the Longsand. She was refloated with the assistance of two tugs and towed in to Harwich. |
| John and Mary | United Kingdom | The schooner was run into by the steamship Venezia (United Kingdom) in the Belfast Lough and was beached. Her crew were rescued by Venezia. John and Mary was on a voyage from Maryport, Cumberland to Belfast, County Antrim. |
| Little Freddy | Argentina | The brigantine was abandoned in the Atlantic Ocean (38°30′N 53°10′W). Her eight crew were rescued by Hope (United States). Little Freddy was on a voyage from Sombrero, Anguilla to Liverpool, Lancashire, United Kingdom. |
| Majestas | United Kingdom | The ship ran aground on the Cutler Sand, in the North Sea off the coast of Essex. She was on a voyage from Seaham, County Durham to Boulogne, Pas-de-Calais, France. She was refloated and assisted in to Harwich in a leaky condition. |
| Orphan | United Kingdom | The steamship was destroyed by fire at Nagasaki, Japan with the loss of one life. |
| Pacific | United Kingdom | The barque was driven ashore at Deal, Kent. She was on a voyage from South Shields to New York, United States. She was refloated and taken in to Ramsgate, Kent in a leaky condition. |
| Reform | United Kingdom | The ship sprang a leak and sank in Skerries Sound. Her crew were rescued. She was on a voyage from Liverpool to Plymouth, Devon. |
| Rover | United Kingdom | The ship was abandoned in the Atlantic Ocean off Stoer Head, Sutherland. She was on a voyage from Thurso, Caithness to Glasgow, Renfrewshire. |
| Treaty | United Kingdom | The ship was driven ashore on the Filey Brigg. She was on a voyage from Hull to Stockton-on-Tees, County Durham. |
| Western Belle | United Kingdom | The schooner was driven ashore near Prawle Point, Devon. She was on a voyage from Hull to São Miguel Island, Azores. |

== 12 January ==
List of shipwrecks: 12 January 1872
| Ship | State | Description |
|---|---|---|
| Alarm | United Kingdom | The schooner capsized in the River Parrett. |
| Bessie | United Kingdom | The schooner ran aground on the Goodwin Sands, Kent . She was on a voyage from Antwerp, Belgium to Bristol, Gloucestershire. She was refloated and taken in to Calais, France in a derelict condition. |
| Boscoppa | United Kingdom | The ship struck a submerged object and was damaged. She was on a voyage from Runcorn, Cheshire to Fareham, Hampshire. She put in to Liverpool, Lancashire in a leaky condition. |
| Celt | United Kingdom | The steamship was driven ashore at Ballyhalbert, County Down. She was on a voyage from the Clyde to Dublin. She was refloated and completed her voyage. |
| Confucius | United Kingdom | The barque ran aground, capsized and sank at Cap Gris Nez, Pas-de-Calais, France. She was on a voyage from Bremen, Germany to Cardiff, Glamorgan. She floated off, but sank with the loss of her captain. Survivors were rescued by a fishing boat. |
| Happy Return | United Kingdom | The ship was driven ashore at Fraserburgh, Aberdeenshire. She was on a voyage from "Port Malock" to London. |
| Hematite | United Kingdom | The steamship ran aground and was wrecked at Cap la Heve, Seine-Inférieure, France. Her crew were rescued. She was on a voyage from the Clyde to Nantes, Loire-Inférieure, France. |
| Island Maid | United Kingdom | The schooner collided with Robert L. Lane (United States) and sank in the English Channel off Start Point, Devon. Five of her eight crew were rescued by Robert L. Lane, three were reported missing. Island Maid was on a voyage from London to Salcombe, Devon. |
| Lass of Courtown | United Kingdom | The ship ran ashore on, or sank off, Flat Holm. She was on a voyage from Cardiff, Glamorgan to Bridgwater, Somerset. She was refloated on 11 January and towed in to Bridgwater where she was placed under repair. |
| Lemari M. | Flag unknown | The ship was abandoned in the Atlantic Ocean. Her crew were rescued by Gwenissa (United States). |
| Malcolm Brown | United Kingdom | The ship was wrecked in Compton Bay. Her crew were rescued by Pride of Dorset (United Kingdom). |
| Margaret | United Kingdom | The smack sank at Ardrossan, Ayrshire. Her crew were rescued. |
| Pearl | United Kingdom | The ship ran aground on the Bolder Bank, in the English Channel. She was on a voyage from Newcastle upon Tyne, Northumberland to Torbay. She put in to Littlehampton, Sussex in a leaky condition. |
| Polyxena | United Kingdom | The barque was wrecked near the Hook Lighthouse, County Wexford. Her nineteen crew were rescued by rocket apparatus. She was on a voyage from Liverpool to London. |
| Romp | United Kingdom | The ship was wrecked on the Haisborough Sands, in the North Sea off the coast of Norfolk. Her crew were rescued. She was on a voyage from Hartlepool, County Durham to London. |
| Samuel Larrabee | Canada | The ship departed from Savannah, Georgia, United States for Bremen, Germany. No further trace, presumed foundered with the loss of all hands. |
| Sovereign | United Kingdom | The barque ran aground on the Arklow Bank, in the Irish Sea off the coast of County Wexford and was abandoned. Her crew were rescued. She was on a voyage from Liverpool to Pomaron, Portugal. |
| Star | United Kingdom | The brig was wrecked on the Haisborough Sands. Her crew were rescued by the brig Williams (United Kingdom). Star was on a voyage from Seaham, County Durham to Whitstable, Kent. |
| Unrestricted | United Kingdom | The brig ran aground. She was on a voyage from Belfast, County Antrim to Liverpool. She was refloated and beached at Southport, Lancashire. |
| W. S. Heard | United Kingdom | The ship ran aground at Yarmouth, Nova Scotia, Canada. She was on a voyage from Yarmouth to New York, United States. |

== 13 January ==
List of shipwrecks: 13 January 1872
| Ship | State | Description |
|---|---|---|
| Albert Victor | United Kingdom | The ship was sighted in the Indian Ocean whilst on a voyage from Calcutta, India for Mauritius. No further trace, presumed foundered with the loss of all hands. |
| Atrevida | Spain | The felucca collided with a fishing boat and sank off Cádiz. Her crew were rescued by the fishing boat. She was on a voyage from Cádiz to Ceuta. |
| Idaho | United States | The ship was driven ashore at Courtown, County Wexford, United Kingdom. All 23 people on board were rescued by the Courtown Lifeboat. She was on a voyage from Liverpool, Lancashire, United Kingdom to New Orleans, Louisiana. |
| L'Orient | France | The brig collided with the barque Pride of the Wear (United Kingdom) and foundered in the English Channel 45 nautical miles (83 km) off The Lizard, Cornwall, United Kingdom with the loss of her captain. Survivors were rescued by Pride of the Wear. |
| Osprey | United Kingdom | The schooner ran aground off Beachy Head, Sussex and was abandoned by her crew. She was on a voyage from Sunderland, County Durham to Poole, Dorset. She subsequently became a wreck. |
| William and John | United Kingdom | The schooner was driven ashore at Amble, Northumberland. She was on a voyage from Leith, Lothian to Great Yarmouth, Norfolk. She was refloated and taken in to Amble. |
| Unnamed | Flag unknown | The ship was wrecked off Cap Gris Nez, Pas-de-Calais, France. |

== 14 January ==
List of shipwrecks: 14 January 1872
| Ship | State | Description |
|---|---|---|
| British Admiral | United Kingdom | The ship was abandoned in the Pacific Ocean. Her crew were rescued. She was on a voyage from San Francisco, California to Calcutta, India. |
| Byethorn | United Kingdom | The ship departed from the River Tyne for Cartagena, Spain. Presumed subsequently foundered in the English Channel with the loss of all fourteen crew; a boat from the ship was washed up at Sandown, Isle of Wight in late January. |
| Deptford | United Kingdom | The brig ran aground on the Whiting Sand, in the North Sea off the coast of Suffolk. She was refloated and beached at Orford, Suffolk in a waterlogged condition. She was on a voyage from Hartlepool, County Durham to London. |
| Horten | Norway | The barque was wrecked off the Caymanas Brake. Her crew were rescued. She was on a voyage from Liverpool, Lancashire, United Kingdom to Matamoros, Mexico. |
| Idalia | United States | The ship was driven ashore at Courtown, County Wexford. Her crew survived. She was on a voyage from Liverpool to New Orleans, Louisiana. |
| Industry | United Kingdom | The schooner sank at Donegal. |
| Ravensworth | United Kingdom | The brigantine was driven ashore 2 nautical miles (3.7 km) east of Weymouth, Dorset. She was on a voyage from Dieppe, Seine-Inférieure to Cardiff, Glamorgan. She was refloated but had to be beached. |
| Westalinden | Norway | The barque was run into by the steamship Churruca (Spain) and beached in the River Thames at Blackwall, Middlesex, United Kingdom. She was then run into by the steamship Hero (United Kingdom) and sank. |

== 15 January ==
List of shipwrecks: 15 January 1872
| Ship | State | Description |
|---|---|---|
| Isabella Sarah | United Kingdom | The ship was driven ashore at "Huitings", Norway and was abandoned by her crew. |
| Jewess | United Kingdom | The tug was run into by a steamship and sank at Gravesend, Kent. |
| Maize | United Kingdom | The ship was driven ashore and sank at Great Yarmouth, Norfolk. Her crew were rescued. |
| Marie Madeleine | France | The brig departed from Saint-Nazaire, Loire-Inférieure for Newcastle upon Tyne, Northumberland, United Kingdom. No further trace, presumed foundered with the loss of all hands. |
| Statesman | United Kingdom | The steamship ran aground at New Orleans, Louisiana, United States. She was on a voyage from New Orleans to Liverpool, Lancashire. |

== 16 January ==
List of shipwrecks: 16 January 1872
| Ship | State | Description |
|---|---|---|
| Grecian | United Kingdom | The barque ran aground at Honfleur, Manche, France. |
| Pearl | United Kingdom | The ship sank at Liverpool, Lancashire. She was on a voyage from Birkenhead, Cheshire to Liverpool. |
| Tavistock | United Kingdom | The schooner departed from Port Talbot, Glamorgan for Waterford. No further trace, presumed foundered with the loss of all hands. |

== 17 January ==
List of shipwrecks: 17 January 1872
| Ship | State | Description |
|---|---|---|
| Beatitude | United Kingdom | The ship was wrecked on the Black Rock Ledge, off Yarmouth, Isle of Wight. Her crew survived. She was on a voyage from West Hartlepool, County Durham to Cardiff, Glamorgan. |
| Celinie | France | The brig was wrecked in Morroch Bay, Wigtownshire, United Kingdom with the loss of her captain. She was on a voyage from Dublin to Ardrossan, Ayrshire. |
| Friends | United Kingdom | The sloop was driven ashore at Drigg, Cumberland. Her crew were rescued. She was on a voyage from the River Duddon to Ellesmere, Cheshire. |
| George | United Kingdom | The Thames barge sank in the River Thames at Blackwall, Middlesex. She was refloated on 20 January. |
| Jeune Antoinette | France | The smack ran aground on the Kimmeridge Ledges, in the English Channel off the coast of Dorset, United Kingdom. Her crew were rescued. She was on a voyage from Saint-Malo, Ille-et-Vilaine to Portsmouth, Hampshire, United Kingdom. |
| Lindesnaes | United States | The ship departed from New York for a British port. No further trace, presumed foundered with the loss of all hands. |
| Mary Ann | United Kingdom | The schooner collided with the barque Pedro (Germany) and sank in the Bristol Channel. Her crew were rescued. |
| Meteor | United Kingdom | The steamship ran aground in the Firth of Clyde. She was on a voyage from Huelva, Spain to Glasgow. She was refloated and completed her voyage. |
| Miaza | United Kingdom | The brig was wrecked on the Haisborough Sands, in the North Sea off the coast of Norfolk. |
| Napier | (United Kingdom of Great Britain and Ireland) Jersey | The smack was driven ashore at West Wittering, Sussex. She was on a voyage from Jersey to Shoreham-by-Sea, Sussex. |
| Stephensons | United Kingdom | The steamship struck the quayside at Liverpool, Lancashire and was severely damaged, sinking at the bow. She was on a voyage from Calcutta, India to Liverpool. |
| Stettin | United Kingdom | The steamship ran aground on Skagen, Denmark. She was refloated and taken in to Copenhagen, Denmark. |
| Superior | United Kingdom | The barque was driven ashore on Piel Island, Lancashire. |
| Thomas Chalmers | United Kingdom | The ship was wrecked on the Kentish Knock with the loss of two of her crew. Survivors were rescued by the steamship Diana (United Kingdom). Thomas Chalmers was on a voyage from South Shields, County Durham to Trouville-sur-Mer, France. |
| Woodside | United Kingdom | The brig was driven ashore north of Bridlington, Yorkshire. Her crew were rescued. She was on a voyage from Ipswich, Suffolk to Newcastle upon Tyne, Northumberland. She was refloated on 20 January and taken in to Bridlington in a severely leaky condition. |
| Wanderer | United Kingdom | The schooner was wrecked in the River Tay with the loss of a crew member. Survivors were rescued by the Broughty Ferry Lifeboat. She was on a voyage from Sunderland, County Durham to Aberdeen. |
| Unnamed | United Kingdom | The Mersey Flat sank in the River Mersey. |

== 18 January ==
List of shipwrecks: 18 January 1872
| Ship | State | Description |
|---|---|---|
| Ariadne | United Kingdom | The ship ran aground in the North Sea. She was on a voyage from South Shields, County Durham to "Matero". She was refloated and put back to South Shields in a leaky condition. |
| Bannockburn | United Kingdom | The barque was driven ashore and wrecked at Nethertown, Cumberland. She was on a voyage from Barrow in Furness to Liverpool, Lancashire |
| Caernarvon | United Kingdom | The brigantine was wrecked on Cefn Sidan, Carmarthenshire with the loss of all hands, six or seven lives. |
| Devonshire Lass | United Kingdom | The ship ran aground on the Platters Sand, in the North Sea off the coast of Essex. She was on a voyage from Exeter, Devon to Sunderland, County Durham. She was refloated and assisted in to Harwich, Essex. |
| Energy | United Kingdom | The brig was driven ashore at Aldeburgh, Suffolk. Her eight crew were rescued. She was on a voyage from Boulogne, Pas-de-Calais, France to Blyth, Northumberland. |
| Freia | Denmark | The ship was wrecked on the north coast of Skagen. She was on a voyage from Bo'Ness, Lothian, United Kingdom to Kiel, Germany. |
| Guiding Star | United Kingdom | The barque was abandoned in the North Sea 10 nautical miles (19 km) off Orfordness, Suffolk. Her eleven crew survived. She was on a voyage from Hull, Yorkshire to Civita Vecchia, Italy. |
| James and Maria | United Kingdom | The ship was driven ashore at Carrickfergus, County Antrim. She was on a voyage from Bangor to Belfast, County Antrim. |
| Magdala | United Kingdom | The steamship was driven ashore and wrecked at Boulmer, Northumberland. Her crew were rescued. She was on a voyage from Dunkirk, Nord, France to Leith, Lothian. |
| Princess Alice | United Kingdom | The ship ran aground on the Burlane Bank, off the coast of County Cork. She was refloated. |
| Ruby | United Kingdom | The brig was wrecked on the Platters Sand. Her crew were rescued by Volunteer (United Kingdom). She was on a voyage from South Shields, County Durham to Exmouth, Devon. |
| Superior | United Kingdom | The ship was driven ashore on Piel Island, Lancashire. |
| Unnamed | United Kingdom | The schooner ran aground on the Pennington Spit, off the coast of Hampshire. |

== 19 January ==
List of shipwrecks: 19 January 1872
| Ship | State | Description |
|---|---|---|
| Drie Gebroeders | Germany | The brigantine collided with a fishing vessel and was abandoned north of the Dogger Bank. She was subsequently taken in to West Hartlepool, County Durham, United Kingdom in a derelict condition. |
| Leon | France | The brig was wrecked at Arzila, Morocco with the loss of one of her nine crew. She was on a voyage from Sierra Leone to Marseille, Bouches-du-Rhône. |
| Francisco Calderon | Peru | The steamship foundered in the Atlantic Ocean 340 nautical miles (630 km) south west of The Lizard, Cornwall, United Kingdom. Her crew were rescued. She was on her maiden voyage, from South Shields, County Durham to Macao and Hong Kong. |
| Unnamed | Flag unknown | The barque ran aground on the Whiting Sand, in the North Sea off the coast of Essex, United Kingdom and sank. |

== 20 January ==
List of shipwrecks: 20 January 1872
| Ship | State | Description |
|---|---|---|
| Forest King | United Kingdom | The brigantine ran aground on Drakes Island, Devon. She was on a voyage from London to Gran Canaria, Canary Islands. She was refloated on 22 January and taken in to Plymouth, Devon in a severely leaky condition. |
| Jane Campbell | United Kingdom | The ship was abandoned in a sinking condition. She was on a voyage from Riga, Russia to Newry, County Antrim. |
| Pahse | United Kingdom | The steamship caught fire whilst on a voyage from Hong Kong to Yokohama, Japan. She put in to Shantou, China where the fire was extinguished. She resumed her voyage on 24 January. |

== 22 January ==
List of shipwrecks: 22 January 1872
| Ship | State | Description |
|---|---|---|
| Beatrice | United Kingdom | The ship was wrecked at Santander, Spain. Her crew were rescued. She was on a voyage from Cardiff, Glamorgan to Santander. |
| Charity | United Kingdom | The fishing yawl was driven ashore and wrecked 5 nautical miles (9.3 km) south of Scarborough, Yorkshire. |
| Percy | United Kingdom | The ship was wrecked at Ardglass, County Down. She was on a voyage from Belfast, County Antrim to Port Dinorwic, Caernarfonshire. |
| Unnamed | Italy | The barque foundered 11 nautical miles (20 km) off Saltee Islands, County Donegal, United Kingdom with the supposed loss of all hands. |

== 23 January ==
List of shipwrecks: 23 January 1872
| Ship | State | Description |
|---|---|---|
| Africana | Italy | The ship was destroyed by fire in the Atlantic Ocean. Her crew were rescued. She was on a voyage from Rio de Janeiro, Brazil to Genoa. |
| Confidence | United Kingdom | The smack was towed in to West Hartlepool, County Durham in a derelict condition. |
| Ravenswheel | United Kingdom | The brig was wrecked at Sines, Portugal. Her crew were rescued. |

== 24 January ==
List of shipwrecks: 24 January 1872
| Ship | State | Description |
|---|---|---|
| Anna | Netherlands | The ship ran aground on the Longsand, in the North Sea off the coast of Essex, United Kingdom. She was on a voyage from the Nieuwe Diep to Curaçao, Curaçao and Dependencies. She was refloated and assisted in to Harwich, Essex in a severely leaky condition and was beached. |
| Bolton | United Kingdom | The brig was driven ashore and wrecked on Coquet Island, Northumberland. Her crew were rescued. She was on a voyage from Granton, Lothian to London. |
| Fop Smit | Germany | The steamship ran aground at Bremerhaven. She was on a voyage from Odesa, Russia to Bremerhaven. She was refloated with the assistance of two tugs. |
| Luigia | United Kingdom | The barque sank in the River Thames at Blackwall, Middlesex. |
| Nonpareil | United Kingdom | The sschooner was driven ashore and wrecked at Vila Franca do Campo, São Miguel Island, Azores. |
| Sapphire | United Kingdom | The steamship was driven ashore at Kirkcaldy, Fife. She was on a voyage from Grangemouth, Stirlingshire to Kirkcaldy. |
| Scipio | United Kingdom | The brig ran aground in Ramsey Bay and was abandoned. Her crew survived. She was on a voyage from Maryport, Cumberland to Dublin. |

== 25 January ==
List of shipwrecks: 25 January 1872
| Ship | State | Description |
|---|---|---|
| Constance | United Kingdom | The brigantine was abandoned at sea. Her crew were rescued by the schooner Cicerone (Flag unknown). |
| Jessie Forrest | United Kingdom | The ship was wrecked at Lagos. She was on a voyage from Liverpool, Lancashire to Lagos. |
| Lizzie | United Kingdom | The ship was sighted in the Atlantic Ocean whilst on a voyage from Barrow in Furness, Lancashire to New York. No further trace, presumed foundered with the loss of all hands. |
| Pelham | United Kingdom | The ship was driven ashore on the coast of the Natal Colony. She was on a voyage from London to a port in the Natal Colony. She was refloated and taken in to port. |

== 26 January ==
List of shipwrecks: 26 January 1872
| Ship | State | Description |
|---|---|---|
| Dauntless | United Kingdom | The ship was wrecked on Barker Island, County Sligo. She was on a voyage from Troon, Ayrshire to Ballina, County Mayo. |
| HMS Hotspur, and Lady Woodhouse | Royal Navy; United Kingdom | The ironclad HMS Hotspur collided with the steamship Lady Woodhouse off Plymouth, Devon. Both vessels were severely damaged. |
| Seaflower | (United Kingdom of Great Britain and Ireland) Jersey | The ship capsized with the loss of all hands. She was on a voyage from Great Yarmouth, Norfolk to Carmarthen. She was beached a Great Yarmouth and was subsequently righted. |
| Spray | United Kingdom | The Thames barge foundered in the North Sea off Grimsby, Lincolnshire. Her crew were rescued. She was on a voyage from Goole, Yorkshire to Maldon, Essex. She was refloated on 29 January and beached at Grimsby. |

== 27 January ==
List of shipwrecks: 27 January 1872
| Ship | State | Description |
|---|---|---|
| Baltic | Sweden | The brig was damaged by an onboard explosion at Cardiff, Glamorgan, United Kingdom. |
| Florence Nightingale | United Kingdom | The steamship foundered in the Atlantic Ocean. Her crew were rescued by the steamship Bassian (United Kingdom). Florence Nightingale was on a voyage from Cardiff to Rio de Janeiro, Brazil. |
| Mary Ann Mandall | United Kingdom | The ship was driven ashore at Islandmagee, County Antrim. She was on a voyage from Ardrossan, Ayrshire to Morecambe, Lancashire. She was refloated with the assistance of a steamship. |

== 28 January ==
List of shipwrecks: 28 January 1872
| Ship | State | Description |
|---|---|---|
| Lizzie | United Kingdom | The ship ran aground on the Culver Sand. She was on a voyage from Cardiff to Bridgwater, Somerset. She was refloated and beached at Littlestoke, Somerset. |
| Shepperton | United Kingdom | The steamship ran aground at Lapseki, Ottoman Empire. She was on a voyage from Nicholaieff, Russia to Hamburg, Germany. |
| Woodburn | United Kingdom | The ship capsized at Greenock, Renfrewshire. |

== 29 January ==
List of shipwrecks: 29 January 1872
| Ship | State | Description |
|---|---|---|
| Castor | United Kingdom | The steamship ran aground in the Elbe downstream of Cuxhaven, Germany. |
| Earl of Aberdeen | United Kingdom | The steamship ran aground in the Elbe downstream of Cuxhaven. |
| Emigrant | Sweden | The brigantine was driven ashore on Vlieland, Friesland, Netherlands. She was on a voyage from Oscarshamn, Sweden to Cardiff, Glamorgan, United Kingdom. |
| Judith | United Kingdom | The schooner was driven ashore at Fraserburgh, Aberdeenshire. She was on a voyage from Lubawa, Courland Governorate to Newcastle upon Tyne, Northumberland. She was refloated and taken in to Fraserburgh in a sinking condition. |
| Lucien | France | The steamship ran aground off Heligoland. She was on a voyage from Havre de Grâce, Seine-Inférieure to Hamburg, Germany. She was refloated with assistance from the steamship Victoria (United Kingdom and towed in to Cuxhaven, Germany. |
| Robin | United Kingdom | The schooner ran aground north of Heligoland. She was on a voyage from Falmouth, Cornwall to Altona, Germany. |
| Sphinx | United Kingdom | The steamship ran aground on the Gunfleet Sand, in the North Sea off the coast of Essex. She was on a voyage from Newcastle upon Tyne, Northumberland to London. She was refloated and resumed her voyage. |
| Telegraph | United Kingdom | The brig was abandoned in the North Sea. She was on a voyage from Stockholm, Sweden to Calais, France. |
| Thames | United Kingdom | The brig was abandoned in the Atlantic Ocean. Her crew were rescued. She was on a voyage from the Abaco Islands to Boston, Lincolnshire. |
| Unnamed | Flag unknown | The schooner was driven ashore in Wigtown Bay. She was refloated and taken into the River Cree in a leaky condition. |

== 30 January ==
List of shipwrecks: 30 January 1872
| Ship | State | Description |
|---|---|---|
| City of Halifax | United Kingdom | The ship was driven ashore at Clynnog Fawr, Caernarfonshire. Her crew were rescued. She was on a voyage from Charleston, South Carolina to Liverpool, Lancashire. |
| Clara Sayers | New South Wales | The barque was wrecked off Rodrigues with the loss of two lives. She was on a voyage from Newcastle to Mauritius. |
| Eclipse | United Kingdom | The brig was driven ashore at Ardrossan, Ayrshire. She was on a voyage from Dublin to Ardrossan. She was refloated on 10 February and towed in to Ardrossan by the tug Flying Meteor (United Kingdom). |
| Eothen | United Kingdom | The ship ran aground at Stornoway, Isle of Lewis, Outer Hebrides. She was on a voyage from Riga, Russia to Belfast, County Antrim. She was refloated and taken in to Stornoway. |
| Majesty | United Kingdom | The schooner foundered in Bideford Bay. Her crew were rescued. |
| Raven | United Kingdom | The ship was driven ashore and wrecked at Lochbay, Isle of Skye, Outer Hebrides. She was on a voyage from Runcorn, Cheshire to Newcastle upon Tyne, Northumberland. |
| Suwonada | China | The steamship struck an uncharted rock in the Hainan Strait and sank south of Itay Island. Her crew were rescued. She was on a voyage from Hong Kong to Shanghai. |

== 31 January ==
List of shipwrecks: 31 January 1872
| Ship | State | Description |
|---|---|---|
| Ariel | United Kingdom | The clipper departed from London for Sydney, New South Wales. Presumed subsequently foundered with the loss of all hands; a lifeboat thought to be from the ship was discovered on King Island, Tasmania in August. |
| Catherine | Germany | The ship struck the Gladstone Rock, in the Farne Islands, Northumberland, United Kingdom. She was on a voyage from Bremen to Grangemouth, Stirlingshire, United Kingdom. She was refloated and taken in to Lindisfarne, Northumberland. |
| James Dackett | United Kingdom | The barque was wrecked at "Ballymacollen", in Ballycotton Bay with the loss of five of her eleven crew. She was on a voyage from Lagos, Africa to Falmouth, Cornwall. |
| Manitoba | Canada | The barque was wrecked on the Bucks, on the coast of Cornwall, with the loss of five of the sixteen people on board. She was on a voyage from Havre de Grâce, Seine-Inférieure, France to Briton Ferry, Glamorgan, United Kingdom. |
| Marys | United Kingdom | The ship was driven ashore at Beaumaris, Anglesey and was severely damaged. sHe was on a voyage from Liverpool, Lancashire to Beaumaris. |
| Penguin | United Kingdom | The ship was driven ashore and wrecked at Florida, Cuba. Her crew were rescued. She was on a voyage from Saint Thomas, Virgin Islands to Havana, Cuba. The wreck was plundered by the local inhabitants. |
| William and Thomas | United Kingdom | The schooner ran aground on the Shipwash Sand, in the North Sea off the coast of Suffolk. She was on a voyage from Newcastle upon Tyne, Northumberland to Messina, Sicily, Italy. She was refloated the next day and taken in to Great Yarmouth, Norfolk in a leaky condition. |

== Unknown date ==
List of shipwrecks: Unknown date in January 1872
| Ship | State | Description |
|---|---|---|
| Agnes Brown | United Kingdom | The ship was driven ashore on Heligoland. She was on a voyage from Bahia, Brazil to the Elbe. She was refloated on 1 February and taken in to the Elbe. |
| Akola | United Kingdom | The ship was driven ashore at Cape Faro. She was on a voyage from Cardiff, Glamorgan to Trieste. She was refloated and resumed her voyage. |
| Amor | United Kingdom | The ship was wrecked near Marstrand, Sweden. Her crew were rescued. She was on a voyage from an English port to Copenhagen, Denmark. |
| Anna | Russia | The ship ran aground off Toulon, Var, France. She was on a voyage from a Russian port to Marseille, Bouches-du-Rhône, France. |
| Anne | Norway | The schooner ran aground on the Longsand, in the North Sea off the coast of Essex, United Kingdom. Her crew were taken off by the tug Robert Owen (United Kingdom), which towed Anne in to Harwich, Essex. |
| Ant | United Kingdom | The ship was driven ashore at Orfordness, Suffolk. |
| Anton | Germany | The ship ran aground on a sunken anchor at Buenos Aires, Argentina and was beached. She was on a voyage from Hamburg to Buenos Aires. She was consequently condemned. |
| Artizan | United Kingdom | The steamship was abandoned off Cape Finisterre, Spain. |
| Assomption | France | The brig ran aground on the Filey Brigg, off the coast of Yorkshire, United Kingdom. She was refloated on 20 January and taken in to Scarborough, Yorkshire. |
| Astronom | United Kingdom | The steamship was driven ashore on Heligoland. She was on a voyage from Havre de Grâce, Seine-Inférieure to Hamburg. She was refloated and resumed her voyage. |
| Bacchus | United Kingdom | The barque was abandoned in the North Sea. Her crew were rescued. She was on a voyage from Danzig, Germany to London. |
| Bavico | Italy | The ship was abandoned in the Mediterranean Sea. She was on a voyage from Marseille to Genoa. |
| Beautemps Beaupre | France | The barque ran aground off Cap-Haïtien, Haiti and was abandoned by her crew. |
| Benjamin | United Kingdom | The ship was driven ashore 6 nautical miles (11 km) from "Lanbruia". She was on a voyage from an English port to "Port Navale". |
| Berendina Margaretha | Netherlands | The galiot was wrecked at Sanlúcar de Barrameda, Spain. Her crew were rescued. |
| Benmore | United Kingdom | The ship ran aground at Horsens, Denmark. She was refloated and taken in to Texel, North Holland, Netherlands. |
| Buona Maria | Italy | The ship foundered in the Adriatic Sea. She was on a voyage from Trieste to Ancona. |
| City of Halifax | United Kingdom | The ship was driven ashore in Carnarvon Bay. She was on a voyage from Charleston, South Carolina, United States to Liverpool, Lancashire. |
| County of Berwick | United Kingdom | The ship ran aground in the Hellegat. She was on a voyage from Java, Netherlands East Indies to Rotterdam, South Holland, Netherlands. She was later refloated and completed her voyage. |
| Cythorn | United Kingdom | The barque departed from the River Tyne for Cartagena, Spain in mid-January. Presumed subsequently foundered with the loss of all fourteen crew; a boat from the ship washed ashore. |
| Daniel O'Connell | United Kingdom | The ship was driven ashore and wrecked on Colonsay, Inner Hebrides. She was on a voyage from Kilrush, County Clare to Belfast, County Antrim. |
| Deutschland | Germany | The ship caught fire at sea. She was on a voyage from Hamburg to Rangoon, Burma. |
| Dina | Denmark | The ship ran agroundl She was on a voyage from Hartlepool, County Durham, United Kingdom to Copenhagen. She was refloated. |
| Dione | United Kingdom | The ship ran aground near Gibraltar. She was refloated. |
| Eiche | Germany | The ship was driven ashore near the Hohe Weg Lighthouse. She was on a voyage from Geestemünde to Wilhelmshaven. |
| Elizabeth | United Kingdom | The brig was wrecked on the Ortiz Bank, off Buenos Aires before 6 January. Her crew were rescued by an Italian barque |
| Elizabeth | (United Kingdom of Great Britain and Ireland) British West Africa | The ship foundered. |
| Elizabeth Tickell | United Kingdom | The ship struck rocks and was damaged. She was on a voyage from Methil, Fife to Teignmouth, Devon. She was refloated and taken in to Burntisland, Fife. |
| Eliza Thornton | (United Kingdom of Great Britain and Ireland) Gibraltar | The ship was driven ashore at Swansea, Glamorgan. She was refloated on 1 February and towed in to Swansea. |
| Ella | (Dominion of Newfoundland) Newfoundland Colony | The ship was driven ashore at Youngs Cove, Nova Scotia, Canada. She was on a voyage from Saint John's to Havana. |
| Ellas Pana | Flag unknown | The ship was wrecked. |
| Elpis | United Kingdom | The ship caught fire. She put in to Constantinople, Ottoman Empire. |
| Elverhoi | United Kingdom | The ship was driven ashore at Sulina, Ottoman Empire. She was on a voyage from Sulina to a British port. She was refloated. |
| Emma | United Kingdom | The fishing smack caught fire in the North Sea and was abandoned by her crew. |
| Emily Stewart | United Kingdom | The ship ran aground on the Corton Sand, in the North Sea off the coast of Suffolk. She was refloated and taken in to Lowestoft, Suffolk. |
| Englishman | United Kingdom | The ship ran aground on the Goodwin Sands, Kent. She was on a voyage from Hamburg to Lagos, Africa. She was refloated and taken into The Downs. |
| Equity | United Kingdom | The ship ran aground on the Brake Sand. She was refloated and taken in to Ramsgate, Kent in a leaky condition. |
| Essex | United Kingdom | The barque ran aground at Inverness. |
| Euphemia | United Kingdom | The fishing lugger collided with the steamship Dido (United Kingdom) and sank in the Firth of Clyde before 13 January. |
| Evening Star | United Kingdom | The ship was driven ashore on Öland, Sweden. She was on a voyage from Memel, Germany to Whitehaven, Cumberland. She was refloated. |
| F. Adams | United Kingdom | The steamship ran aground at South Shields, County Durham. She was on a voyage from Huelva, Spain to South Shields. She was refloated. |
| Flora | United Kingdom | The full-rigged ship was abandoned in the Atlantic Ocean before 7 January. |
| Florida | United States | The ship foundered. She was on a voyage from New Orleans, Louisiana to Apalachicola, Florida. |
| Friedrick Buckman | Germany | The ship ran aground in the Elbe upstream of Altenbruch. She was refloated with the assistance of a tug and towed in to Cuxhaven. |
| Galatea | United States | The ship was abandoned at sea. She was on a voyage from the Turks Islands to Boston, Massachusetts. |
| Garnet | United Kingdom | The schooner was holed by ice and foundered in the Gut of Canso. Her crew were rescued. She was on a voyage from Halifax to Guysborough, Nova Scotia. |
| Gloria | Norway | The ship ran aground at Cape Foutan, near Odesa, Russia. She was refloated and towed in to Odesa. |
| Grace and Ann | United Kingdom | The ship ran aground at Penmon, Anglesey. She was on a voyage from Liverpool to Bray, County Wicklow. She was refloated and found to be severely leaky. |
| Helena Donner | Germany | The barque caught fire in the Atlantic Ocean before 18 January and was abandoned. Her crew were rescued by Ventus (United Kingdom). Helena Donner was on a voyage from Swansea to Valparaíso, Chile. |
| Helevig Sieve | Netherlands | The ship ran aground. She was on a voyage from Adrianople, Ottoman Empire to Rotterdam. She was refloated and taken in to Brouwershaven, Zeeland in a leaky condition. |
| Hermino | Portugal | The schooner was wrecked at Casablanca, Morocco. |
| Hibernica | United Kingdom | The schooner was driven ashore at Queenstown, County Cork. |
| Indos | United Kingdom | The ship was lost off "Canea", Cyprus before 12 January with the loss of a crew member. She was on a voyage from Taganrog, Russia to a British port. |
| Ireland | United Kingdom | The ship was abandoned in the Irish Sea on or before 3 January. She was towed in to the Tudwall Roads by the Abersoch Lifeboat on 6 January. |
| Irene | Netherlands | The ship ran aground at "Mapatan". She was refloated and resumed her voyage. |
| Jacobus Albers | Germany | The ship ran aground at Amsterdam, North Holland and sprang a leak. She was on a voyage from Hamburg to Buenos Aires. |
| James Landells | United Kingdom | The brig was wrecked at Two Rivers. |
| Jane Emily | United Kingdom | The ship was driven ashore at Dunbar, Lothian. She was on a voyage from Inverness to Sunderland, County Durham. She was refloated and resumed her voyage. |
| Jean Tullea | France | The brig was wrecked at "Lacalle". |
| Jessie | (United Kingdom of Great Britain and Ireland) Guernsey | The ship ran aground on the Cross Sand, in the North Sea off the coast of Norfolk. She was on a voyage from London to South Shields. She was refloated and taken in to Great Yarmouth, Norfolk. |
| Joseph Heydon | United Kingdom | The ship ran aground whilst on a voyage from Hong Kong to Rangoon. She was refloated three days later and resumed her voyage. |
| Josephine | United Kingdom | The ship ran aground on the Foreness Rock, Margate, Kent. |
| Josephine Oulton | United Kingdom | The ship sprang a leak and was beached at Havana. She was on a voyage from New Orleans to Liverpool. |
| Lioness | United Kingdom | The tug put in to Howth, County Dublin in a sinking condition. |
| Loire et Bretagne | France | The ship was wrecked on the Pointe de La Coubre, Charente-Inférieure by 12 January. She was on a voyage from Bordeaux, Gironde to Nantes, Loire-Inférieure. |
| Manoel Legaffin | France | The ship was wrecked at Martinique. |
| Marcus | France | The steamship was driven ashore at Quillebeuf-sur-Seine, Eure. She was on a voyage from Rouen, Seine-Inférieure to Alexandria, Egypt. She was refloated and taken in to Quillebeuf-sur-Seine. |
| Margaret | United Kingdom | The steamship was driven ashore at Boulmer, Northumberland. She was on a voyage from Dunkirk, Nord, France to Leith. |
| Margaret | United States | The ship ran aground off the coast of Delaware. She was on a voyage from Hamburg to Philadelphia, Pennsylvania. She was refloated with assistance. |
| Maria | Germany | The schooner was driven ashore at "Gioja". Her crew were rescued. She was on a voyage from Gallipoli, Ottoman Empire to an English port. |
| Maria Schongrund | Germany | The ship was driven ashore and wrecked on Rügen. She was on a voyage from Hamburg to Wolgast. |
| Marseille | France | The ship ran aground and was wrecked at Maracaibo, Venezuela. |
| Mary Anne | United Kingdom | The ship was driven ashore in Ardmore Bay. She was on a voyage from Llanelly, Glamorgan to Youghal, County Cork. |
| Mary B. | United Kingdom | The ship was wrecked in Carmarthen Bay. |
| Mary Blair | United Kingdom | The ship was driven ashore at Cape Bon, Beylik of Tunis. She was on a voyage from Sulina to a British port. |
| Mary Burdell | United States | The ship was driven ashore at Sandy Hook, New Jersey. She was on a voyage from Pará, Brazil to New York. |
| Marysville | United Kingdom | The ship was beached. She was on a voyage from Saint John, New Brunswick, Canada to Boston, Massachusetts. |
| Mimi | United Kingdom | The pilot boat was driven ashore at Queenstown. |
| Mount Carmel | United Kingdom | The ship ran aground on the Outer Dowsing Sandbank, in the North Sea off the coast of Lincolnshire, and sank. She was on a voyage from Sunderland to Livorno, Italy. |
| Messanger | United States | The fishing schooner was lost on the Western Banks. Lost with all 12 hands. |
| Newon Principio | Flag unknown | The ship ran aground on the Fontain Shoal, in the Adriatic Sea off Parenzo, Austria-Hungary. |
| Nuova Giuseppe | Flag unknown | The ship was driven ashore on the Horseshoe Reef. She was on a voyage from Philadelphia to Queenstown. She was refloated and towed in to Philadelphia. |
| Ocean Wave | United Kingdom | The ship ran aground off Scarborough. She was refloated. |
| Otranto | Italy | The ship ran aground near Veruda, Austria-Hungary. |
| Patria | Italy | The barque was driven ashore at Castellammare del Golfo, Sicily. |
| Peter Rohland | United Kingdom | The ship ran aground in the River Thames at Gravesend, Kent. She was on a voyage from London to Bremerhaven. |
| Ralph Carlton | United States | The ship was driven ashore at Sandy Hook. She was on a voyage from Cárdenas, Cuba to New York. |
| Sara | Germany | The ship was driven ashore near Sandsfoot Castle, Dorset. She was on a voyage from Riga, Russia to Bridport, Dorset. She had been refloated by 19 January. |
| Sea Harrier | United States | The ship was wrecked. She was on a voyage from Bahia, Brazil to New York. |
| Sentinel | United Kingdom | The ship was wrecked. She was on a voyage from the Turks Islands to Halifax. |
| Skiddaw | United Kingdom | The ship ran aground on the Goodwin Sands, Kent. She was on a voyage from South Shields to Alexandria. She was refloated. |
| Sovereign | United Kingdom | The ship was abandoned at sea. She was on a voyage from Dublin to London. |
| Staatsraad | Netherlands | The steamship ran aground on the Goodwin Sands. She was on a voyage from Middlesbrough, Yorkshire to Galveston, Texas, United States. She was refloated and resumed her voyage, but put in to Plymouth, Devon in a leaky condition. |
| Statelie | United Kingdom | The ship was driven ashore and damaged. She was on a voyage from Rangoon to Liverpool. She was refloated and put back to Rangoon. |
| Strathardle | United Kingdom | The ship was wrecked at Saint-Vallier, Quebec, Canada before 16 January. She was on a voyage from Dénia, Spain to Montreal, Quebec. She was refloated in April and towed in to Indian Cove, Newfoundland Colony. |
| Susanna | Netherlands | The ship ran aground on the Kentish Knock. She was on a voyage from Rotterdam to Samarang, Netherlands East Indies. She was refloated and put back to Rotterdam. |
| Sveridge | Sweden | The steamship ran aground at "Kobberig". She was refloated. |
| Tavistock | United Kingdom | The ship was wrecked in Carmarthen Bay with loss of life. |
| Teodoro | Greece | The schooner was wrecked near Agathopolis, Ottoman Empire. She was on a voyage from "Frangaki" to Nicholaieff, Russia. |
| Thames | United Kingdom | The steamship ran aground near Dartmouth, Devon. She was on a voyage from London to the Natal Colony. She was refloated and resumed her voyage. |
| Thebe and Ellen | (Dominion of Newfoundland) Newfoundland Colony | The ship capsized. She was on a voyage from Saint John's to Havana. |
| Trial | United States | The ship was abandoned at sea. She was on a voyage from Richmond, Virginia to Bahia, Brazil. |
| Urho | Russia | The ship ran aground off Snekkersten, Denmark. She was on a voyage from Riga to an Irish port. She was refloated. |
| Victoria | United Kingdom | The ship was driven ashore and wrecked at Deal, Kent. She was reported to have been on a voyage from Liverpool to New York. |
| Vidar | United Kingdom | The steamship was driven ashore at Blakeney, Norfolk. She was on a voyage from South Shields to London. She was refloated on 22 January and resumed her voyage. |
| Vittoria | Italy | The ship was driven ashore at Towyn, Merionethshire, United Kingdom. She was on a voyage from Havre de Grâce to Cardiff. |
| Welinki Knas Alexei | Russia | The steamship was driven ashore. She was on a voyage from Riga to Hull, Yorkshire. She was refloated and put in to Copenhagen in a leaky condition. |
