= Kyabram Football Club =

Australian rules football and netball club

Kyabram

Names
- Full name: Kyabram Football Netball Club
- Nickname: Bombers

Club details
- Founded: 1886
- Colours: Black Red
- Competition: Goulburn Valley Football League
- President: John Guinan
- Coach: Corey Carver & Kaine Herbert
- Premierships: 16 (1919, 1921, 1922, 1926, 1927, 1928, 1948, 1950, 1958, 1975, 1996, 2013, 2016, 2017, 2019, 2025)
- Ground: Kyabram Recreation Reserve

Uniforms
Home

The Kyabram Football Netball Club, nicknamed the Bombers, is an Australian rules football and netball club based in the town of Kyabram, Victoria. The club teams currently compete in the Goulburn Valley Football League (GVFL).

== History ==
Kyabram was a foundation club in the Goulburn Valley Football League (GVDFA) in 1893 and initially wore a white and blue jersey, with red stockings.

Kyabram did not affiliate with the GVDFA between 1895 and 1898, but the "Kyabram Ramblers FC" were active playing a number of friendly matches against other local teams in 1896.

Kyabram FC rejoined the GVDFA in 1899.

Kyabram changed their club jumper in 1911 to red and black colours.

The club had a successful era the 1920s, when they won five GVFL premierships, including the Kyabram Reserves winning the senior football premiership in the Northern Goulburn Football Association in 1929.

The club has produced many VFL/AFL footballers, including Ross Dillon, Garry Lyon, Kayne Pettifer, Nick Holman and Brett Deledio. Kyabram's Chris Stuhldreier won the GVFL goal-kicking every season from 1991 to 1994, including a record setting 164 goals in 1993.

Between round one of 2016 and the preliminary final of 2018 the club won an astounding 62 consecutive wins. The sequence stopped at the 2018 Grand Final. The club was then undefeated once again in 2019, then had their next loss in round three in 2021 against Echuca.

Only the Shepparton Football Club have won more premierships that Kyabram.

== Football Premierships ==
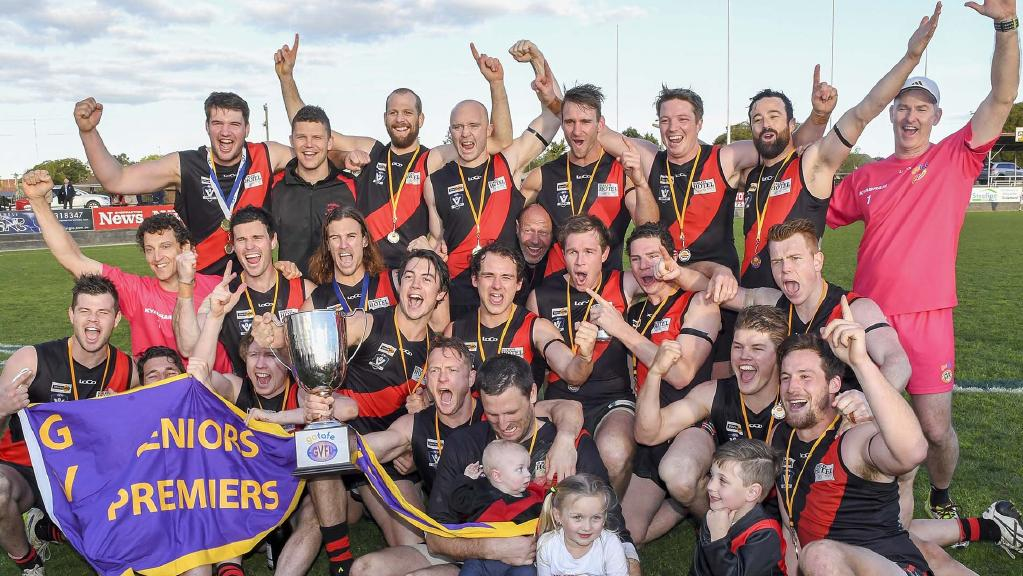
2016 GVFNL Premiers: Kyabram FC Seniors

Seniors

League	Total flags	Premiership years
Goulburn Valley FL	16	1919, 1921, 1922, 1926, 1927, 1928, 1948, 1950, 1958, 1975, 1996, 2013, 2016, 2017, 2019, 2025
Northern Goulburn Football Association	1	1929

== League Best & Fairest Winners ==
Senior Football

- Goulburn Valley Football League – Morrison Medal winners
  - Jeff Cooper (1958, 1961)
  - Charles Stewart (1963)
  - Dick Clay (1964)
  - Peter Gittos (1987)
  - Benny Gugliotti (1993)
  - Lincoln Withers (2008)
  - Michael Mattingly (2019)
  - Toby Mckiernan (2026)

Reserves Football

- Goulburn Valley Football League – Abikhair Medal winners
  - 1964 - David Bates
  - 1971, 1972, 1973 - Max Murley
  - 1996 - Peter Leer
  - 1999 - J Chapman
  - 2000 - Steven Kerwin

Thirds Football

- Goulburn Valley Football League – Pattison Medal winners
  - 1962 - F Fanning
  - 1966 - Paul Rowlands
  - 1978 - Michael Fry
  - 1980 - Ross Normington
  - 1990 - Adam Houlihan
  - 1992 - Andrew Trimby
  - 1994 - Michael Portia
  - 2007 - Alec Young
  - 2012 - Hayden Gemmill
  - 2019 - Mitchell Gugliotti

== VFL / AFL Players ==
The following footballers played with Kyabram prior to playing senior VFL / AFL football, with the year indicating their debut season.

- 1904 – Tom Hawking: South Melbourne
- 1914 – Charlie Fisher: Carlton (premiership player)
- 1919 – George Parkinson: Richmond
- 1920 – Billy James: Richmond (premiership player)
- 1920 – Roy Outram: Collingwood & Richmond
- 1925 – Percy Outram: Carlton
- 1955 – Peter Aitken: Carlton
- 1959 – Cliff Deacon: South Melbourne
- 1960 – Ian Howard: Footscray
- 1961 – Barry Bryant: Carlton
- 1961 – Graeme Haslem: Hawthorn
- 1965 – Bryan Pleitner: Footscray
- 1966 – Dick Clay: Richmond (premiership player)
- 1966 – Ross Dillon: Melbourne
- 1966 – Frank Fanning: Footscray
- 1966 – Maurie Fowler: Carlton
- 1969 – Paul Rowlands: Melbourne
- 1973 – Shane Fitzsimmons: Melbourne
- 1975 – Colin Graham: Melbourne
- 1975 – John Sparks: Melbourne
- 1976 – Maurice Wingate: Melbourne
- 1979 – Kelly O'Donnell: Melbourne
- 1982 – Trevor Castles: Melbourne
- 1982 – Stuart McKenzie: Melbourne
- 1985 – Daryl Bourke: Melbourne
- 1986 – Gary Lyon: Melbourne
- 1987 – Bradley Sparks: Melbourne
- 1995 – Glen Coghlan: St. Kilda
- 2001 – Kayne Pettifer: Richmond
- 2005 – Brett Deledio: Richmond
- 2014 – Nick Holman: Carlton & Gold Coast Suns
- 2024 - Anthony Depasquale: Werribee Football Club
