= Federal Football Netball Club =

Federal "Swans" FNC Inc.

Names
- Full name: Federal Football Netball Club
- Nickname: Swans

Club details
- Founded: 1892; 134 years ago as "Mount Elliot FC"
- Dissolved: 11th November 2022
- Colours: white red
- Competition: UMFNL
- Premierships: UMFNL: (27) 1895, 1897, 1898, 1901, 1902, 1918, 1925, 1933, 1934, 1935, 1945, 1959, 1960, 1965, 1975, 1976, 1977, 1980, 1983, 1986, 1988, 1989, 1993, 1994, 2006, 2007, 2016, 2022
- Ground: Corryong Recreation Reserve (capacity: 8,000)

Uniforms
Home

Other information
- Official website: Federal FNC

The Federal Football Netball Club was an Australian rules football and netball club in the Upper Murray Football League, the club was known as the Swans based in Corryong, Victoria. The club fielded all senior and junior sides in both the football and netball competitions for many years.

Federal almost went into recess prior to the start of the 2022 football season, but avoided it at the last minute, but unfortunately the club went into recess after the end of the 2022 season.

== History ==
Originally known as Mount Elliott, the club enjoyed premiership success in the Corryong Football Association (CFA), precursor of the Upper Murray Football League, on three occasions in 1894, 1897 and 1898. The Mount Elliott "Miners" did not compete in the CFA in 1900. Mount Elliott apparently then became known as the Federal Football Club in 1901 to celebrate the Federation of Australia and moved to be fully based at Corryong around the same time, while this article states that "the remains of the old Mount Elliott team" joined up with Khancoban FC in 1900. which would indicate that the Mount Elliott FC actually folded after the 1899 season and did not change their name to the Federal FC in 1901.

This article in the lead up to the 1901 season suggests that the Khancoban FC may of changed its name to the Federal FC which included three home games for the Federal FC at Khancoban in 1901, with no reference at all that Mount Elliott FC changed its name to the Federal FC as mention in the above paragraph.

Federal's claimed their first pre-world war one flag in 1901 (in the yellow and black colours) when they lost the last match of the home and away season to Walwa, but then won it on protest and thus the premiership and won it again in 1902 at the expense of Cudgewa.

In 2022, a 1901 Upper Murray Football Association premiership medallion, won by the Federal FC was returned to the club by relatives of the original recipient, a Mr. W McClure.

In May 1902 after a club meeting at Khancoban, the club presented premiership medals to all 1901 UMFA premiership players.

In May 1904, due to a dispute over the football premiership trophy, the Federal FC withdrew from the UMFA and Walwa FC was of the opinion that the new trophy should not be accepted. Subsequently the season was abandoned in May 1904. In June 1904, the UMFA was taken over by a new committee of management and was named the Corryong District Association , When this new association was formed in June 1904, both Federal FC and Walwa FC were not included in the updated draw for the remainder of the 1904 season.

After a break of five years, the Federal FC returned to the UMFA in 1909 and over the remainder of the twentieth century Federal firmly established itself as one of the UMFL's leading clubs, claiming at least one premiership every decade.

The 1920s brought several grand final appearances but only one flag, achieved in 1925 against Walwa. Over the course of the 1930s the Swans, with a total of three premierships, all claimed in succession between 1933 and 1935, vied with Walwa as the competition's most successful club.

In 1928, Mr A E Eastlake was elected as the club secretary for the 21st consecutive year. Mr A E Eastlake resigned as Secretary / Treasurer at the 1929 Annual General Meeting.

Federal began the post-war period by downing Walwa, 8.8 (56) to 3.9 (27), in the 1945 grand final, but there then followed an unusually long premiership drought that was not broken until 1959. The Swans overcame Corryong in that year's grand final, as they would do again the following season. Both matches were close, with Federal getting home by 10 points in the former year and 9 points in the latter.

The remainder of the 1960s saw the Swans contesting another four grand finals but only once, against Cudgewa in 1965, did they emerge victorious. The ensuing decade was altogether more successful as the side procured its second hat trick of grand final triumphs between 1975 and 1977 besides finishing second on four occasions.

The 1980s proved to be the Swans' most successful decade to date, with grand final victories over Tumbarumba in 1980, Border-Walwa in 1983, Cudgewa in 1986, Corryong in 1988, and Border-Walwa in 1989. There were also losing grand final appearances against Corryong in both 1985 and 1987.

== 2000 and beyond ==
The club had successive grand final wins in 1993 and 1994, while since the turn of the century the Swans have been grand finalists five times for victories in 2006 over Corryong and 2007 against Bullioh and in 2016 over Corryong.

Overall, their record of 27 UMFL premierships places them third on the all-time list behind Corryong (31) and Cudgewa (28).

== Football Premierships ==
Upper Murray Football League

Senior Football (27)

- 1894, 1987, 1898, 1901, 1902, 1918, 1925, 1933, 1934, 1935, 1945, 1959, 1960, 1965, 1975, 1976, 1977, 1980, 1983, 1986, 1988, 1989, 1993, 1994, 2006, 2007, 2016,2022

Reserves Football

- ?

Thirds Football

- 2012, 2015, 2017

Midgets/Under 13's

- 1981, 1985, 2009, 2013, 2014, 2015,

== Netball Premierships ==
Upper Murray Football Netball League

A. Grade

- 2004,2005,2006,2007,2008.2009,2010,2011,2012,2013

B. Grade

- 2003,2010,2011,2012,2013, 2019

C. Grade

- 2005,2010,2013,2014,2016

D. Grade

- 2010,2011,2014,2016, 2019

Under 15

- 2016
- 2022

Under 14

- 2013

== VFL / AFL Players ==
The following footballers played with Federal, prior to playing senior football in the VFL/AFL, and / or drafted, with the year indicating their VFL/AFL debut.

- 1964 - Kevin Smith - Richmond
- 1966 - Darryl Herrod - Geelong & Fitzroy
- 1983 - Jonathan Collins - North Melbourne
- 1992 - Adrian Whitehead - Carlton
- 2010 - Shaun Atley - North Melbourne
- 2017 - Joseph Atley - Port Adelaide
- 2019 - James_Jordon - Melbourne

== League Best & Fairest Winners ==
An award for the "best all-round footballer" in the Upper Murray Football Association was first awarded in 1926 and was voted on by the general public. In 1927 there was no fewer than three different football awards donated by local business owners in the Upper Murray FA. These were - Mrs McDonough's Crystal Cafe, Mrs Graham's and Mr Anderson.

The first official UMFA senior football best and fairest award was donated and presented in 1940. Donor T A Edwards donated a silver cup for the award.

Senior Football

- 1926 - Colin Lennox
- 1927 - Jack White
- 1928 - Jack White
- 1929 - Goldie Whitehead
- 1931 - S McKenzie
- 1940 - A B Lloyd
- 1948 - Jack Edmondson
- 1949 - John Couttie *
- 1960 - Kevin Smith
- 1961 - Kevin Smith
- 1968 - Ross McKimmie
- 1980 - Doug Paton *
- 1981 - Doug Paton
- 1989 - Jonathan Collins
- 1995 - Peter Tolsher
- 1998 - Baxter Oliver
- 1999 - Laurie McInnes
- 2000 - Laurie McInnes
- 2003 - Ian McKimmie
- 2007 - Neville Nugent
- 2010 - Warren Sinclair
- 2011 - John Forrest
- 2015 - Brent Ohlin
- 2016 - Brent Ohlin
- 2019 - Tom McKimmie
- 1949 - (tied with the winner on votes, but finished as runner up under the old countback system)
- 1980 - (tied with the winner on votes, but finished as runner up under the old countback system)

A Grade Netball

- 2004 - Chrissie McKimmie
- 2007 - Chrissie McKimmie
- 2008 - Amy Paton
- 2010 - Chrissie McKimmie
- 2016 - Sallie Findlay
- 2018 - Leah Mathey
- 2019 - Sophie Pattison
- 2022 - Sallie Findlay

A Grade Team of the Year

- 2016 Sallie Findlay, Jahla Hunt
- 2018 Lrah Mathey, Chrissie McKimmie, Claudia McKimmie
- 2019 Leah Mathey, Claudia McKimmie, Sallie Findlay, Amy Paton

B Grade Netball

- 2004 - Tonia Turner
- 2011 - Sallie Findlay
- 2012 - Jorja Coysh
- 2014 - Nikki Nugent
- 2018 - Tiarnee Hunt
- 2019 - Chrissie McKimmie
- 2022 - Kelsie Lupson

C Grade Netball

- 2010 - Vanessa Bardrick
- 2012 - Sarah Triggs
- 2013 - Jahla Hunt
- 2016 - Georgia Wilson

D Grade Netball

- 2010 - Elise Wilson
- 2011 - Kerrie Clarke
- 2014 - Nicole Davis
- 2016 - Isobel Norman
- 2018 - Kate Butler

15 & Under Netball

- 2018 - Maddie McKimmie
- 2019 - Orianne Hunt

UMFNL Champion Club

- 2016
- 2018

== League Goal Kicking Awards ==
Most Goals in a Grand Final

- 1986- Daryl Jordan 12 goals

100 Goals or more in a season

- 1979 - Daryl Jordan
- 1983 - Daryl Jordan
- 1986 - Daryl Jordan
- 1987 - Daryl Jordan

== See also ==
- Upper Murray Football Netball League
- Tallangatta & District Football League
- Australian rules football in Victoria
- Australian rules football in New South Wales
