= Barry Bryant =

Australian rules footballer

Personal information
- Full name: Barry Bryant
- Born: 4 May 1940 (age 86)
- Original teams: Walwa, Kyabram
- Height: 178 cm (5 ft 10 in)
- Weight: 72 kg (159 lb)
- Position: forward

Playing career^{1}
Years	Club	Games (Goals)
1960–1961	Carlton	14 (5)
1962	Brunswick	8 (16)
- ^{1} Playing statistics correct to the end of 1962.

Barry Bryant (born 4 May 1940) is a former Australian rules footballer who played for the Carlton Football Club in the Victorian Football League (VFL).

Bryant was originally from Walwa and played in four consecutive Upper Murray Football League premierships from 1955 to 1958 and remarkably played alongside his brother, Gordon and father, Milne (aka 'Spud') in all four flags. Bryant won the 1957 Upper Murray Football League best and fairest award and was also runner up in 1958.

Bryant then played with Kyabram in 1959 and won the club best and fairest award, before debuting with Carlton in round two on Anzac Day, 1960 against Fitzroy.
