= Riley Bice =

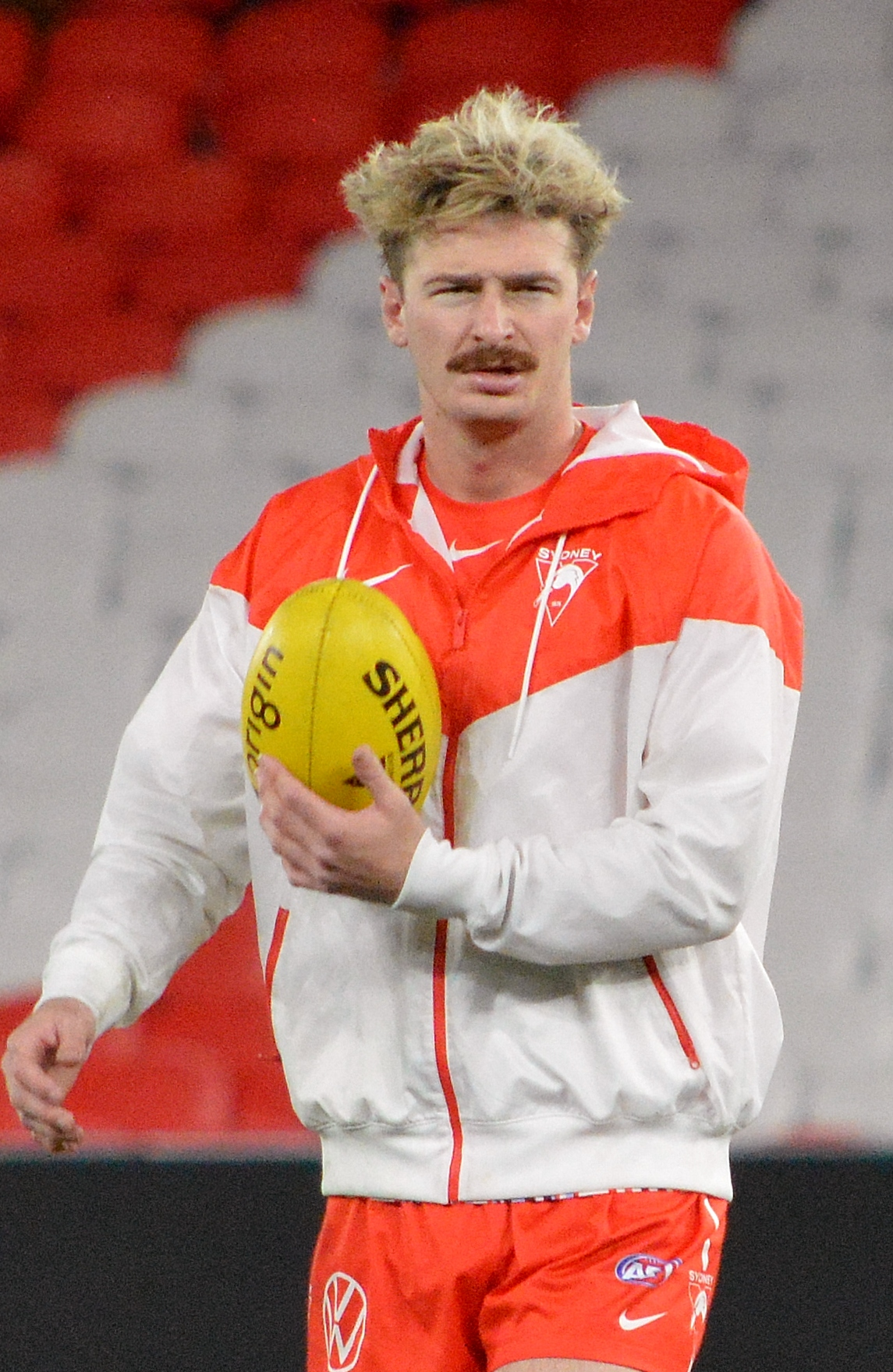
- Bice in August 2026

Personal information
- Born: 26 September 2000 (age 26)
- Original teams: Albury (OMFNL); Murray Bushrangers (Talent League); GWS Giants (VFL); Werribee (VFL)
- Draft: No. 41, 2024 AFL draft
- Debut: Round 1, 2025, Sydney vs. Brisbane Lions, at the SCG
- Height: 186 cm (6 ft 1 in)
- Position: Defender

Club information
- Current club: Sydney
- Number: 26

Playing career^{1}
| Years | Club | Games (Goals) |
| 2025– | Sydney | 36 (4) |
- ^{1} Playing statistics correct to the end of round 23, 2025.

Career highlights
- VFL premiership player: 2024

Riley Bice (born 26 September 2000) is an Australian rules footballer who plays for the Sydney Swans in the Australian Football League (AFL).

== Pre-AFL career ==
Bice played junior football for the Murray Bushrangers in the Talent League. He played local football for Albury in the Ovens & Murray Football Netball League.

In 2022, Bice played three games for the GWS Giants in the VFL. In 2024 he returned to the VFL with Werribee, and was part of their drought-breaking premiership side, recording 23 possessions in the Grand Final against Southport.

== AFL career ==
Bice was drafted by the Sydney Swans with pick 41 of the 2024 AFL draft. He was selected to make his debut in round 1 of the 2025 AFL season. At the end of the 2025 season, Bice was rewarded with a contract extension to the end of 2028.

On 19 August 2026, Bice was one of five Sydney players suspended by the club for the remainder of the 2026 AFL season after an incident inside a hotel room in Melbourne. A report of sexual assault was made by a woman who was in the hotel room, although it has not been suggested in media reports that any of the players are being accused of sexual assault. On 3 September, it was publicised that Bice was cleared as a suspect in the case, and was being treated as a witness. The Swans confirmed that Bice would remain suspended for the rest of the season, due to the suspension being based on behavioural standards.
