= 2026 Sydney Swans player investigation =

Sydney Swans player investigation
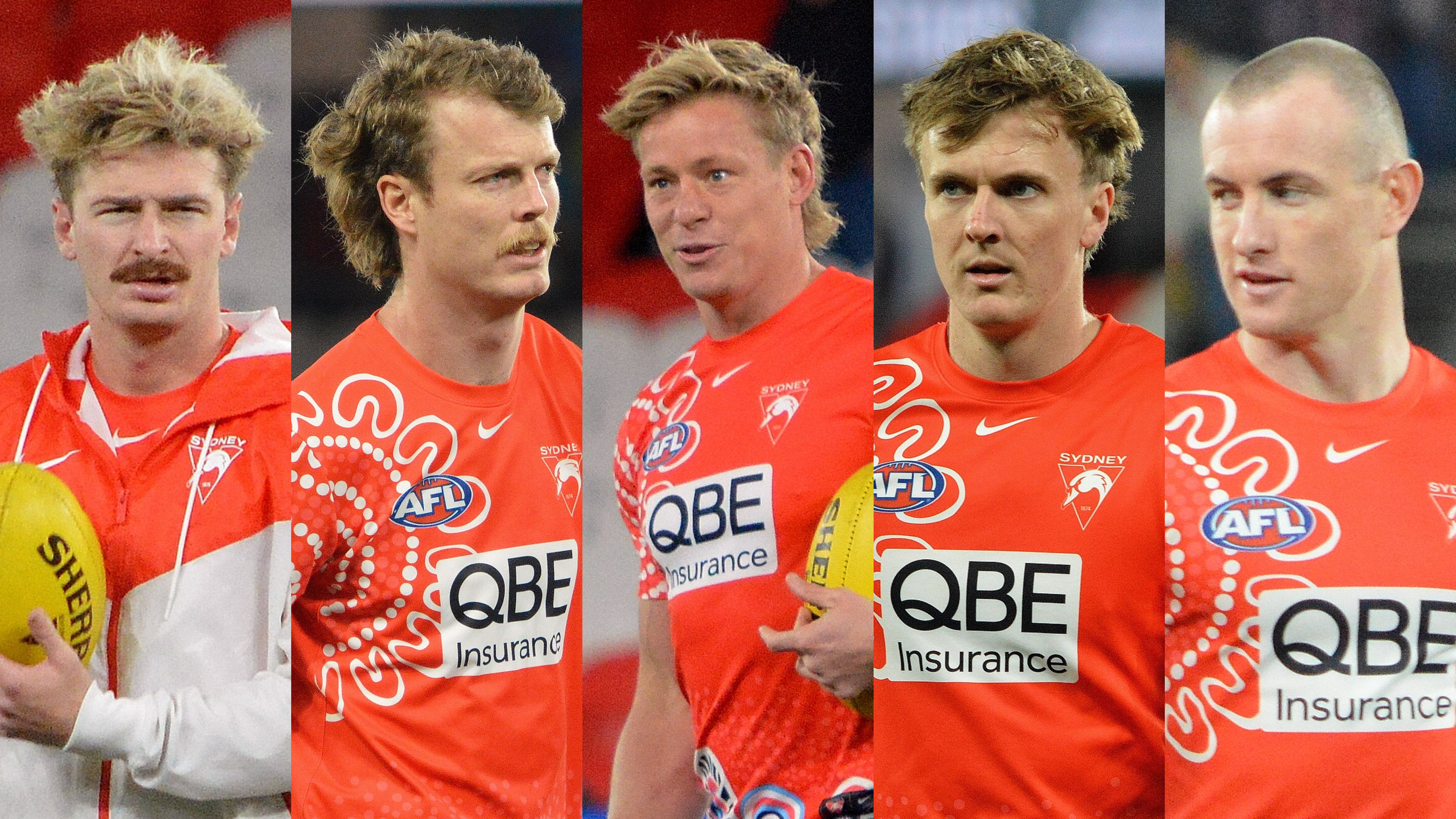
- L–R: Bice, Blakey, Heeney, Jordon, Warner
- Date: 17 August 2026 – ongoing
- Venue: Pullman Hotel
- Location: East Melbourne, Victoria, Australia
- Participants: Sydney Swans

On 17 August 2026, a report of sexual assault was made at the Pullman Hotel in East Melbourne, following an incident inside the hotel room of a Sydney Swans player that occurred earlier that morning. Several players had stayed up late following the club's victory over Essendon in a match held the previous afternoon.

Two days later, Sydney announced that five of its players – Riley Bice, Nick Blakey, Isaac Heeney, James Jordon and Chad Warner – would be stood down from playing in the Australian Football League (AFL) for the remainder of the 2026 season, citing breaches of the club's behavioural standards. The involved players were dubbed the "Pullman Five".

The reports of sexual assault were investigated by Victoria Police over the following three months, and concluded on 13 November with no charges being laid.

== Timeline of events ==
On 16 August 2026, the Sydney Swans defeated the Essendon Football Club by 36 points at the Melbourne Cricket Ground (MCG) in round 23 of the 2026 AFL season. Members of Sydney's playing and coaching groups went out for drinks later that evening; according to the club, staff had gathered for a "pre-planned get together" and their actions were "not inappropriate". Several players remained out until the early morning hours of 17 August.

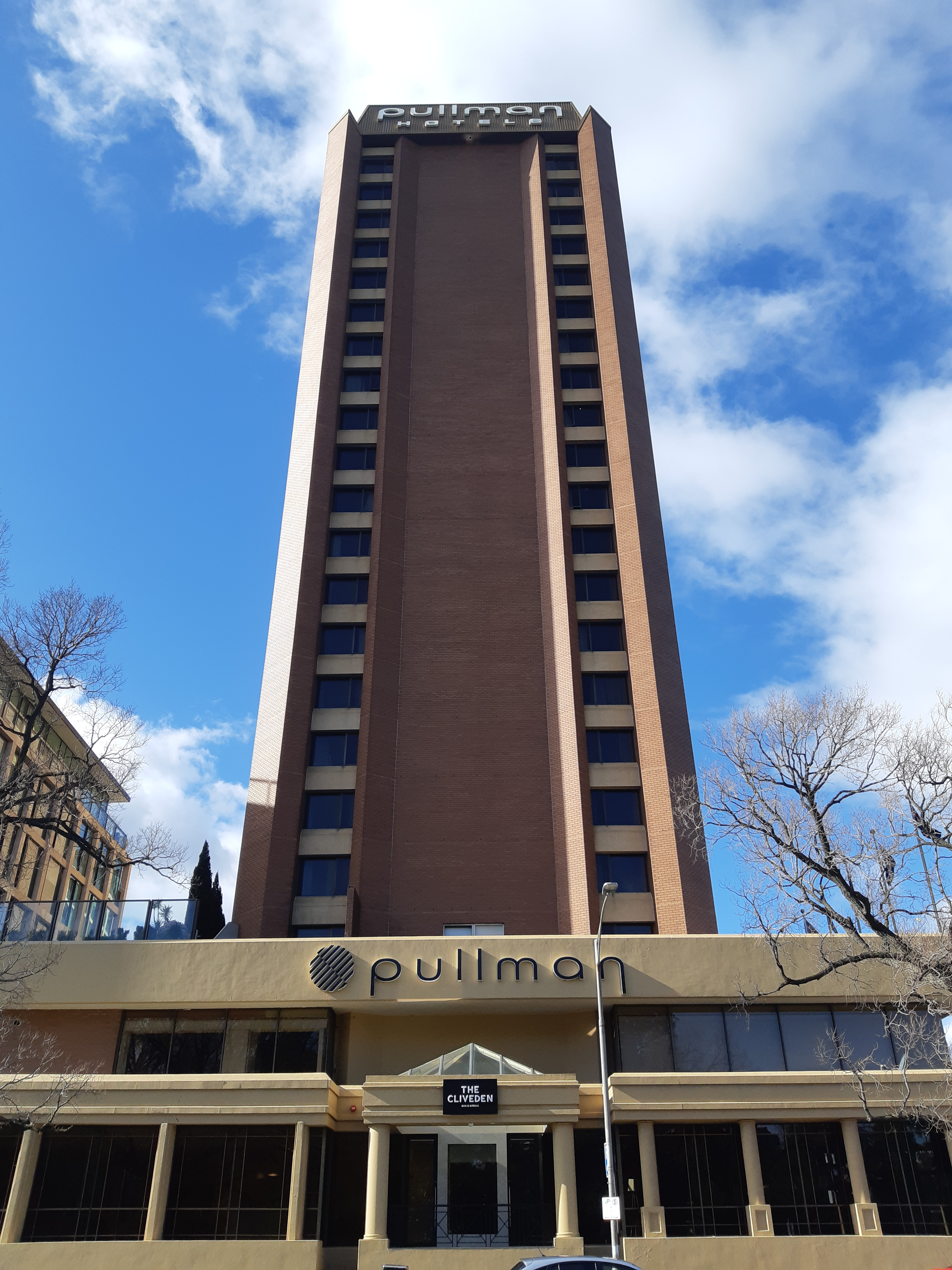
The Pullman Hotel in East Melbourne

After returning to the Pullman Hotel in East Melbourne – where Swans players, coaches and staff were staying overnight – several current players moved to one hotel room. According to The Sydney Morning Herald, a "former Swans player and a further friend joined the group for at least a period of this night". Sports journalist Tom Morris reported that two topless waitresses were booked by a player, with a third arriving at 5:30am for a two-hour booking. Morris also reported that multiple players took cocaine in the hotel room, although it was unclear which players were involved in drug use. Separately, ABC News reported that detectives had been told some Sydney players paid the women to consume drugs off their bodies.

While it is uncertain what happened next, one of the women soon made an allegation of sexual assault. Two women left the hotel room and entered the foyer, where they were joined by a third woman, before a "commotion" occurred at around 7:30am. At that time, the women confronted Sydney staff, including head coach Dean Cox, who was described as "shocked" by the scene that was taking place.

At 11:58am that morning, Sydney released a short statement, saying it "can confirm several players were involved in an alleged incident in Melbourne last night" and the club had "notified the AFL and relevant authorities". Around the same time, Victoria Police confirmed it was "investigating a report of a sexual assault in East Melbourne" and "the exact circumstances are yet to be established and the investigation into the incident remains ongoing". It was revealed in media reports later that evening that five Sydney players – Riley Bice, Nick Blakey, Isaac Heeney, James Jordon and Chad Warner – were involved, although there were no specific allegations or suggestions of wrongdoing made against the players.

== Aftermath ==
=== Reaction ===
Sydney CEO Matthew Pavlich said the club was "deeply embarrassed and ashamed that the poor choices of five of our players" and the impact it had "on the women involved, the club, our supporters and so many other people". AFL CEO Andrew Dillon said the "conduct and serious allegations regarding Sydney players are deeply concerning" and raised "broader issues for our game and our responsibilities as a sport", while also saying the woman who made the report to police was "entitled to privacy and care". Ben Carroll, the Premier of Victoria, said that although the matter was under police investigation, all women "deserve to be treated with respect and to be given the safety that they deserve".

Telecommunications company Telstra suspended its brand ambassadorship deals with any Sydney players involved with the ongoing investigation.

The next match played by the Sydney Swans women's team, against Essendon on 23 August at the SCG, drew a club record women's crowd of 16,672 spectators. The men's team took to the ground immediately afterwards, in a round 24 clash against North Melbourne. According to reports made on podcast Mamamia Out Loud, hundreds of people exited the stadium in between the two games to express their outrage, despite their tickets allowing them to remain and watch the men play. Some waved placards as they left the stadium, and the final attendance was 30,058, the Sydney men's lowest home crowd for the year.

=== Player sanctions ===
Sydney announced on the evening of 18 August that the club's board would meet to agree on player sanctions and penalties, after conducting its own interviews with the players involved in the incident. The club said the players were in "serious breach" of the club's expected behaviour and standards. The following morning, Sydney revealed that Bice, Blakey, Heeney, Jordon and Warner would be ineligible for team selection for the remainder of the 2026 AFL season, including the finals series.

In a joint statement released following the announcement of the suspensions, the five players said they were "deeply sorry to everyone involved" and their behaviour had "fallen well short" of the standards expected and the values of the club.

The AFL had intended to release the 2026 All-Australian squad – representing the 46 best-performed players from the 2026 season – on the evening of 17 August, before it was delayed when the incident was revealed. On 19 August, the AFL confirmed that the five suspended Sydney players would not be considered for selection in the All-Australian squad. Blakey, Heeney and Warner were seen as in contention to make the squad based on their performances from the 2026 season.

=== Victoria Police investigation ===
The reports of sexual assault were investigated by Victoria Police over the following three months. Only four of the players – Warner, Blakey, Heeney and Jordon – were investigated as suspects; Bice was cleared early in the investigation and treated as a witness. The investigation concluded on 13 November when Victoria Police announced it had insufficient evidence to lay criminal charges.

As of November 2026, a civil case brought against the players by the women involved in the incident remains active.

=== Impact on Sydney's season ===
At the time of the incident, Sydney had secured second place on the AFL ladder regardless of the result of its one remaining match, guaranteeing a home qualifying final and double chance. However, the suspensions of the five players, and mental impact to the rest of the team, meant that their chances at winning the premiership were seen to have dropped dramatically. The team immediately fell from $6.50–7.00 second favouritism in premiership betting, out to a seventh favourite paying $26–$34, and was not even favoured by betting agencies to win its round 24 match against 14th-placed North Melbourne. Sydney chairman Andrew Pridham, in announcing the suspensions, said the club's board had accepted that it had effectively "torpedoed its season" with its decision.

Sydney won its round 24 match against North Melbourne by 53 points, with several players shedding tears at the end of the match in the emotion of the victory.

Two weeks later, Sydney hosted third-placed Brisbane Lions in a qualifying final in which it was considered a $3.50 underdog with bookmakers; and its chances of victory fell further when captain Callum Mills ruptured his anterior cruciate ligament in the first quarter, ending his match and season. However, Sydney dominated the match, winning 21.15 (141) def. 13.10 (88) by 53 points. It was considered one of the biggest finals upsets of all time, and it was described by some, including forward Tom Papley, as one of the greatest wins in the club's history. Sydney's season ended when they lost the preliminary final against Fremantle Football Club two weeks later, leading in the third quarter before conceding the last six goals to be overrun by 12 points.

=== AFL Trade Period ===
During the 2026 trade period Nick Blakey requested a trade away from the Swans, as he was unhappy at being suspended for breaching club rules and regulations over his role in the events. He was eventually traded to North Melbourne on October 13, on an 8 year contract worth more than $11 million. Blakey's father John Blakey had played for North Melbourne. After being traded to North Melbourne, Blakey apologised for his role in the Pullman Hotel scandal as well as the circumstances surrounding his exit from the club.
