= Jonathan Collins =

Australian rules footballer

Jon Collins

Personal information
- Full name: Jonathan Collins
- Born: 14 March 1961 (age 65)
- Original teams: Federal (UMFNL), Wodonga
- Height: 174 cm (5 ft 9 in)
- Weight: 75 kg (165 lb)

Playing career^{1}
Years	Club	Games (Goals)
1983–1985	North Melbourne	24 (9)
1986–1987	St Kilda	16 (2)
Total		40 (11)
- ^{1} Playing statistics correct to the end of 1987.

Jonathan Collins (born 14 March 1961) is a former Australian rules footballer who represented the North Melbourne Football Club and the St Kilda Football Club in the Victorian Football League (VFL) during the 1980s.

A speedy wingman, Collins came from Wodonga to begin his VFL career with North Melbourne in 1983. He had a strong season in 1984, playing 15 games for the club, gaining two Brownlow votes. After a third season with North in 1985, Collins moved to St Kilda. Collins' 1986 season added another 15 games, and a further five Brownlow votes. After one game in 1987, Collins left St Kilda.
