= Frank Fanning =

Australian rules footballer

Personal information
- Full name: Frank Fanning
- Born: 28 November 1945 (age 80)
- Original team: Kyabram
- Height: 178 cm (5 ft 10 in)
- Weight: 70 kg (154 lb)

Playing career^{1}
Years	Club	Games (Goals)
1966	Footscray	2 (0)
- ^{1} Playing statistics correct to the end of 1966.

Frank Fanning (born 28 November 1945) is a former Australian rules footballer who played with Footscray in the Victorian Football League (VFL).
