= Nick Blakey =

Australian rules footballer (born 2000)

- Blakey pre-match with Sydney in 2026

Personal information
- Full name: Nicholas Blakey
- Nickname: Lizard
- Born: 27 February 2000 (age 26)
- Original team: UNSW-Eastern Suburbs Bulldogs (AFL Sydney)
- Draft: No. 10, 2018 national draft
- Height: 196 cm (6 ft 5 in)
- Weight: 80 kg (176 lb)
- Position: Defender

Club information
- Current club: North Melbourne

Playing career^{1}
Years	Club	Games (Goals)
2019–2026	Sydney	173 (54)
2027–	North Melbourne	0 (0)
Total		173 (54)
- ^{1} Playing statistics correct to the end of the 2026 season.

Career highlights
- All-Australian team: 2024; Kirk–Ward Medal: 2026 (game 1); AFL Rising Star nominee: 2019

Nick Blakey (born 27 February 2000) is a professional Australian rules footballer playing for the North Melbourne Football Club in the Australian Football League (AFL). He previously played for the Sydney Swans from 2019 to 2026. Blakey was named in the 2024 All-Australian team.

== Early life ==
Blakey was born in Melbourne. His father, John Blakey, was a Fitzroy player and dual premiership midfielder for North Melbourne.

He moved to Brisbane with his family at two years of age, due to his father assistant coaching at Brisbane Lions, before settling in Sydney as a six-year-old when his father joined Sydney Swans coaching panel. He grew up in Sydney's Eastern Suburbs and attended Waverley College. Blakey participated in the Auskick program at East Sydney Bulldogs. In his final year of junior football, he scored 18 goals.

Blakey had a choice of three possible clubs, North Melbourne and the Brisbane Lions through the father–son rule, and the Sydney Swans as a member of the Swans' Development Academy. In early 2018, Blakey revealed his preference was to play for the Sydney Swans.

== AFL career ==
He was recruited by the Sydney Swans with the 10th draft pick in the 2018 AFL draft matching a bid from Greater Western Sydney. Blakey received a 2019 AFL Rising Star nomination in round 14 of the 2019 AFL season, for his two goal effort against Hawthorn.

On 5 June 2023, Blakey became the first player contracted until the 2030s with a seven year contract extension handed to him by the Sydney Swans.

On 19 August 2026, Blakey was one of five Sydney players suspended by the club for the remainder of the 2026 AFL season after an incident inside a hotel room in Melbourne. A report of sexual assault was made by a woman who was in the hotel room, although it has not been suggested in media reports that any of the players are being accused of sexual assault.

In the wake of his suspension amidst the ongoing investigation, Blakey's relationship with the Swans fractured, causing him to seek a trade. North Melbourne's reported offer of an eight-year contract worth approximately $11 million led him to request a trade to the Roos, which was completed on 13 October.

== Statistics ==
Updated to the end of the 2026 season.

Legend
G	Goals	K	Kicks	D	Disposals	T	Tackles
B	Behinds	H	Handballs	M	Marks

Season	Team	No.	Games	Totals							Averages (per game)							Votes
Season	Team	No.	Games	G	B	K	H	D	M	T	G	B	K	H	D	M	T	Votes
2019	Sydney	22	21	19	14	153	68	221	50	48	0.9	0.7	7.3	3.2	10.5	2.4	2.3	0
2020 (Note: The 2020 season was played with 17 home-and-away matches per team (down from 22) and 16-minute quarters with time on (down from 20-minute quarters with time on) due to the impact of the COVID-19 pandemic.)	Sydney	22	16	8	13	126	36	162	36	36	0.5	0.8	7.9	2.3	10.1	2.3	2.3	0
2021	Sydney	22	17	3	6	138	75	213	65	28	0.2	0.4	8.1	4.4	12.5	3.8	1.6	0
2022	Sydney	22	24	2	3	350	118	468	104	50	0.1	0.1	14.6	4.9	19.5	4.3	2.1	0
2023	Sydney	22	24	2	1	318	175	493	98	32	0.1	0.0	13.3	7.3	20.5	4.1	1.3	5
2024	Sydney	22	26	5	5	414	130	544	154	31	0.2	0.2	15.9	5.0	20.9	5.9	1.2	4
2025	Sydney	22	23	10	10	400	92	492	126	33	0.4	0.4	17.4	4.0	21.4	5.5	1.4	7
2026	Sydney	22	22	5	5	381	183	564	90	31	0.2	0.2	17.3	8.3	25.6	4.1	1.4	5
Career			173	54	57	2280	877	3157	723	289	0.3	0.3	13.2	5.1	18.3	4.2	1.7	21

== Honours and achievements ==
Team

- AFL minor premiership (Sydney): 2024
- McClelland Trophy (Sydney): 2026

Individual

- All-Australian team: 2024
- Kirk–Ward Medal: 2026 (game 1)
- AFL Rising Star nominee: 2019
