= Bradley Sparks =

Australian rules footballer

Personal information
- Full name: Bradley Sparks
- Born: 21 August 1967 (age 59)
- Original team: Kyabram / Moorabbin
- Height: 180 cm (5 ft 11 in)
- Weight: 75 kg (165 lb)

Playing career^{1}
Years	Club	Games (Goals)
1987–1989	Melbourne	4 (4)
- ^{1} Playing statistics correct to the end of 1988.

Bradley Sparks (born 21 August 1967) is a former Australian rules footballer who played with Melbourne in the Victorian Football League (VFL).
