= Stuart McKenzie (Australian footballer) =

Australian rules footballer

Personal information
- Full name: Stuart McKenzie
- Born: 27 March 1961 (age 65)
- Original team: Kyabram
- Height: 191 cm (6 ft 3 in)
- Weight: 89 kg (196 lb)

Playing career^{1}
Years	Club	Games (Goals)
1982	Melbourne	10 (0)
- ^{1} Playing statistics correct to the end of 1982.

Stuart McKenzie (born 27 March 1961) is a former Australian rules footballer, who played with Melbourne in the Victorian Football League (VFL). He last played for Melbourne in 1982, under the team called Demons.
