= Lake La Rose, Nova Scotia =

Community in Nova Scotia, Canada

Coordinates: 44°42′50″N 65°26′30″W

Lake La Rose in Nova Scotia

Lake La Rose is a community in the Canadian province of Nova Scotia, located in Annapolis County. It is at an elevation of approximately 135m, adjacent to a lake of the same name.
