= Kevin Smith (footballer, born 1942) =

Australian rules footballer

Personal information
- Full name: Kevin Smith
- Born: 21 September 1942
- Died: 26 June 2003 (aged 60)
- Original teams: Federal, (Upper Murray Football League), Myrtleford
- Height: 188 cm (6 ft 2 in)
- Weight: 92 kg (203 lb)
- Position: Centre half back

Playing career^{1}
Years	Club	Games (Goals)
1956-1961	Federal	95 (330)
1962-63, 1967-75	Myrtleford	176 (218)
1964-1966	Richmond	47 (3)
1976-1978	Yackandandah	61 (232)
Total		379 (783)
- ^{1} Playing statistics correct to the end of 1978.

Career highlights
- UMFL Premierships: 1959, 1960; Federal: best & fairest: 1960; UMFL best & fairest: 1960, 1961; Richmond: best 1st year player: 1964; O&MFL Premiership: 1970; Myrtleford best & fairest: 1969, 1970, 1974; O&MFL Hall of Fame Inductee: 2011

Kevin Smith (21 September 1942 – 26 June 2003) was a former Australian rules footballer who played with Richmond in the Victorian Football League (VFL).
