= Border-Walwa Football Netball Club =

Walwa Football Netball Club

Border-Walwa

Names
- Full name: Border-Walwa Football Netball Club
- Nickname: Magpies

Club details
- Founded: 1960; 66 years ago (Note: Merged club: Border United FC & Walwa FC)
- Dissolved: 9 February 2020
- Colours: black white
- Competition: UMFNL
- Premierships: UMFNL: 7: 1984, 1990, 1991, 1992, 1996, 1997, 1998
- Ground: Walwa Recreation Reserve

Uniforms
Home

The Border-Walwa Football Netball Club was an Australian rules football and netball club founded in 1960 in Walwa, Victoria, whose teams formerly competed in the Upper Murray Football Netball League.

== History ==
Based in Walwa, in the Upper Murray region of north-eastern Victoria, the Border-Walwa Football Netball Club was a grassroots Australian rules football and netball club. Combined, the predecessor clubs had participated in Upper Murray football since 1898., the Border Walwa Football Netball Club was a grassroots Football and Netball Club. All up the combined club's have been kicking footballs since 1898.

Club	Nickname	Location	State	Ground	Est.	Years	Premiers won	Premiership Years
Walwa (Note: Merged with Border United FC after the 1960 season to form the Border-Walwa FC.)	Tigers	Walwa	VIC	Walwa Recreation Reserve	1898	1898-1960	15	1900, 1920, 1922, 1929, 1931, 1936, 1937, 1940, 1948, 1949, 1950, 1955, 1956, 1957, 1958.
Border United (Note: Merged with Walwa FC after the 1960 season to form the Border-Walwa FC.)	Hoppers	Jingellic	NSW	Jingellic Cricket Ground	1950	1950-1960	0	
Border-Walwa (Note: Formed from merger of Border United FC & Walwa FC after the 1960 season.) (Note: Border-Walwa FNC entered a state of recess from 2020, they hope to return for 2021.)	Magpies	Walwa	VIC	Walwa Recreation Reserve	1960	1961–2019	7	1984, 1990, 1991, 1992, 1996, 1997, 1998.

=== Walwa FC (1898-1960) "Tigers" ===
Walwa Tigers kit

In 1898 the Walwa Football Club was based in Walwa, Victoria, playing their home games from the Walwa Recreation Reserve. The club competed in the Upper Murray Football League from 1898 to 1960, with the exception being -

- 1905-1908: in recess
- 1916-1917: World War One &
- 1941-1944: World War Two

Walwa won 15 senior premierships & were also 11 time runners-up competing in 26 grand finals during that time. The first of these premierships was won in 1900 when the club wore the green and yellow colours.

Competition	Level	Wins	Year won
UMFL	Senior	15	1900, 1920, 1922, 1929, 1931, 1936, 1937, 1940, 1948, 1949, 1950, 1955, 1956, 1957, 1958.

=== Border United FC (1950-1960) "Hoppers" ===
Border United Hoppers kit

In 1950 the Border United Football Club was based in Jingellic, New South Wales, playing their home games from the Jingellic Cricket Ground. The club competed in the Upper Murray Football League from 1950 to 1960. Border United never won a senior premiership, however they were 1957 Grand Final runners-up, losing to Walwa, 9.13 (67) to 4.6 (30).

Competition	Level	Wins	Year won
UMFL	Seniors	0	
UMFL	Reserves	1	1959

=== Border-Walwa FNC (1960-2020) "Magpies" ===
Border-Walwa Magpies kit

In 1960 the Border-Walwa Football Club was based in Walwa, Victoria, playing their home games from the Walwa Recreation Reserve. The club competed in the Upper Murray Football League from 1961. Border-Walwa has won 7 senior premierships & also were 11 time runners-up competing in 18 grand finals during that time.

Combined the Walwa FC, the Border United FC, & the Border-Walwa FNC have won a total of 22 senior premierships, with the Border-Walwa FNC on seven senior premierships officially recognised by the Upper Murray Football Netball League. This is similar to how combined the Fitzroy FC, the Brisbane Bears, & the Brisbane Lions have won a total of 11 VFL/AFL premierships, but the Brisbane Lions only has 3 VFL/AFL premierships officially recognised by the Australian Football League.

Competition	Level	Wins	Year won
UMFL	Seniors	7	1984, 1990, 1991, 1992, 1996, 1997, 1998
UMFL	Reserves	5	1975, 1977, 1986, 1987, 1991
UMFL	Thirds	0	

==== 2000 and beyond ====
On Saturday 23 May 2015, the Border-Walwa senior football team broke its 47-match losing streak after beating Corryong by 35 points at Corryong. As reported by The Border Mail that night:

It was just priceless to see the joy on the faces of the supporters and committee members who have been through the tough times and keep turning up each weekend to help out and support the club.

At the club's annual general meeting on Sunday 9 February 2020 the Border Mail reported that Border-Walwa Football Netball Club's had decided to enter recess for the 2020 season. A number of factors were cited including population decline, but mainly the devastation of the Upper Murray from the 2019/2020 Australian Bushfires. They hope to re-join the league in 2021.

The Border Walwa FNC facilities have now been transformed into the Walwa Community Centre to assist the small local community with social cohension and a meeting place for other groups.

== Season records ==
Season	Position	Finals result
1984		Premiers
1990		Premiers
1991		Premiers
1992		Premiers
1996		Premiers
1997		Premiers
1998		Premiers

== Grand Final appearances ==
Year	Opponent	Result
1984		Won
1990		Won
1991		Won
1992		Won
1993		Lost
1996		Won
1997		Won
1998		Won

== Netball ==
Border-Walwa fielded netball teams in the Upper Murray Football Netball League for many decades alongside its football program. The club participated across senior and junior netball grades and formed an important part of the local sporting community.

=== Netball premierships ===
Grade	Premierships	Years
A Grade		
B Grade		
Junior grades		

== Club officials ==
=== Senior coaches ===
Coach	Years	Premierships

=== Senior captains ===
Captain	Years

== Club honours ==
=== Leading goalkickers ===
Player	Goals	Season

=== Junior football ===
Border-Walwa fielded junior football teams in Upper Murray junior competitions for many years.

== League Best and Fairest Winners ==
Upper Murray Football League

Senior Football

- 1945 - Harold Purss
- 1946 - Harold Purss
- 1953 - Jack Lowthian
- 1957 - Barry Bryant
- 1959 - Max Hore
- 1969 - Tony Emerson
- 1970 - Tony Emerson
- 1983 - Mark Hallihan
- 1990 - Mark Albers
- 1991 - Mark Albers
- 1992 - Wayne Edwards
- 1993 - Steve McCormack
- 1996 - Mark Albers
- 1997 - Mark Albers
- 1999 - Kevin Hunt
- 2002 - Rick Sibraa
- 2017 - Dan McCarthy

Reserves Football

- ?

== VFL Players ==
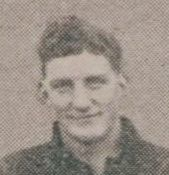
Frank Hanna 1948

- 1947 - Frank Hanna: Melbourne
- 1951 - Lance "Gibbie" Mann: Essendon. Mann also won the 1952 Stawell Gift
- 1960 - Barry Bryant: Carlton

== Notable players ==
- Barry Bryant
- Frank Hanna
- Lance Mann

== See also ==
- Australian rules football in Victoria
- Australian rules football in New South Wales
- Upper Murray Football Netball League
- List of Australian rules football clubs in Victoria
