= Waldeck, Nova Scotia =

Community in Nova Scotia, Canada

Coordinates: 44.628°N 65.633°W

Location of Waldeck in Nova Scotia

Waldeck is a community in the Canadian province of Nova Scotia, located in Annapolis County. Nearby are the communities of Waldeck East and Waldeck West.

It was settled after the American Revolution by disbanded German troops (Hessians) from the Principality of Waldeck who had fought on the British side during the war.
