= Maurice Wingate =

Australian rules footballer

Personal information
- Full name: Maurice Wingate
- Born: 19 October 1957 (age 69)
- Original team: Kyabram
- Height: 183 cm (6 ft 0 in)
- Weight: 79.5 kg (175 lb)

Playing career^{1}
Years	Club	Games (Goals)
1976–80	Melbourne	39 (13)
- ^{1} Playing statistics correct to the end of 1980.

Maurice Wingate (born 19 October 1957) is a former Australian rules footballer who played with Melbourne in the Victorian Football League (VFL).
