= Chad Warner =

Australian football league player (born 2001)

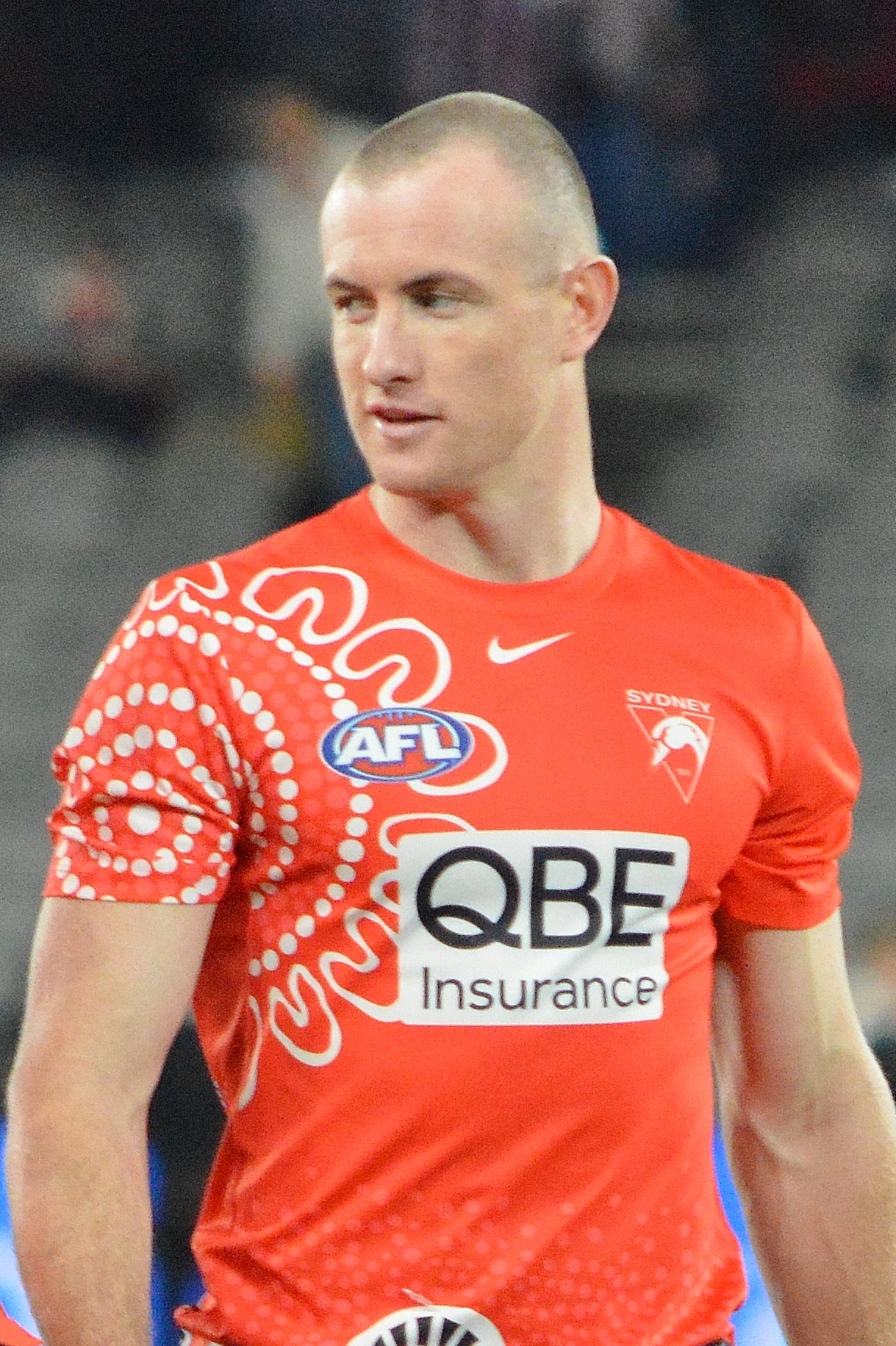
- Warner in August 2026

Personal information
- Nicknames: The Chad, Curly
- Born: 19 May 2001 (age 25); Willetton, Western Australia
- Original team: East Fremantle (WAFL)
- Draft: No. 39, 2019 AFL draft, Sydney
- Debut: 12 July 2020, Sydney vs. Richmond, at The Gabba
- Height: 185 cm (6 ft 1 in)
- Weight: 82 kg (181 lb)
- Position: Midfielder

Club information
- Current club: Sydney
- Number: 1

Playing career^{1}
| Years | Club | Games (Goals) |
| 2020– | Sydney | 130 (132) |

Representative team honours
| Years | Team | Games (Goals) |
| 2026 | Western Australia | 1 (1) |
- ^{1} Playing statistics correct to the end of round 23, 2026.

Career highlights
- All-Australian team: 2024; 2021 AFL Rising Star nomination; 2x Goodes-O’Loughlin Medal: 2023, 2024; Brett Kirk Medal: 2025 (game 1)

Chad Warner (born 19 May 2001) is an Australian rules footballer who plays for the Sydney Swans in the Australian Football League (AFL). He was recruited by the Sydney Swans with the 39th draft pick in the 2019 AFL draft.

== Early football ==
Warner played for the Willetton Junior Football Club in his home suburb of Willetton in Western Australia. He played for East Fremantle in the Western Australian Football League colts division for the 2019 season, playing 9 games and kicking 8 goals. He also represented Western Australia in the AFL Under 18 Championships. He also played football for his school Aquinas College, Perth, in the Public Schools Association.

His father Travis Warner, and grandfather Graeme Warner, both played football for the Nhill Football Club in the Wimmera Football League. Travis moved to Perth in the late 1990s to play for South Fremantle in the West Australian Football League (WAFL), playing 34 games in three seasons.

== AFL career ==
=== 2020–2021: Debut seasons ===
Warner debuted in the Swans' eight-point loss to the Richmond Tigers in the 6th round of the 2020 AFL season, alongside teammate Dylan Stephens. On his debut, Warner picked up 8 disposals, 2 marks and 2 tackles.

After a great start to the 2021 AFL season, Warner received a 2021 AFL Rising Star nomination after he kicked 2 goals, collected 20 disposals and had 417 metres gained in a career-best performance against Richmond in Round 3. He re-signed with the club the day he received his nomination, keeping him at the club until 2023. The following week saw him named as one of the Swans' best after he collected 23 disposals, his highest total in a game to that point.

In 2021, Warner missed round 13 due to leg soreness. He returned in their 1-point loss to Greater Western Sydney in Week 1 of the Finals.

=== 2022–2023: Rise ===
Warner started the 2022 season by missing the opening round with COVID-19 but he played the next game and was the one who kicked the ball to Lance Franklin when he kicked his 1000th goal. He then enjoyed a breakout 2022 season with his burst and impact per touch immediately marking him as one of the best young players of the competition. AFL journalist Damian Barrett spoke many times about the high esteem he places him in, even counting him a certainty to win the Brownlow at some stage. His season was awarded when he was included in the All-Australian squad and was the runner-up in the Bob Skilton Medal. He was clearly one of the best on ground for the Swans in their grand final loss.

In Round 5 of the 2023 season, Warner played his first game alongside his younger brother Corey Warner in which Corey kicked his first goal. In Sydney’s Indigenous Round clash with Carlton, Warner stepped up, collecting 29 disposals and kicking 2 goals to be awarded with the Goodes–O’Loughlin Medal for best on ground in the game. Warner finished the 2023 season after playing 21 out of a possible 24 games for Sydney and polling his team's second-most Brownlow votes with 16 on the night. His poll was only behind fellow young player Errol Gulden, who polled 27.

=== 2024: All-Australian selection and second Grand Final loss ===
Warner had an excellent year in 2024, helping Sydney reach the Grand Final. Warner starred across the year which was reflected with his inaugural All-Australian selection. Warner's standout performances of the season were in rounds 11, 18, and 22. Round 11 was a four-goal, 25-disposal display in a 14-point win over the Western Bulldogs. Round 18 included 31 disposals and 6 clearances in a dominant 79-point win. Finally, Round 22 brought a match-winning 33-disposal two-goal outing which helped accomplish a three-point win over Collingwood. On Grand Final day, Warner was active, having 21 disposals and kicking a goal; however, they fell short and lost by 60 points to the Brisbane Lions.

=== 2025: Form slump and Finals absence ===
2025 came with a lot of change for Sydney with a new coach in, Dean Cox, and the absence of star midfielder Errol Gulden for the majority of the season, which caused the Swans to finish 10th and miss finals. Warner fell a bit in 2025, not kicking over 2 goals in a game at all during the year and only collecting 30 or more disposals on one occasion. Warner's best performances of the year were first in his Brett Kirk Medal–winning performance of Round 8 when he dominated clearances with 7, and collected 24 disposals; additionally, his performance in round 10 was also commendable, where he gained 30 disposals and kicked two goals; finally, in round 22, Warner helped the Swans accomplish a two-point win over eventual premiers, Brisbane, through his 26 disposals and 2 goals. 2025 also came with the opportunity for Chad to play more games alongside his brother Corey, as Corey found himself playing 14 games for the seniors.

=== 2026: Season and suspension ===
On 19 August 2026, Warner was one of five Sydney players suspended by the club for the remainder of the 2026 AFL season after an incident inside a hotel room in Melbourne. A report of sexual assault was made by a woman who was in the hotel room, although it has not been suggested in media reports that any of the players are being accused of sexual assault.

== Family ==
Warner is the older brother of fellow Swans player Corey Warner.

== Statistics ==
Updated to the end of round 22, 2026.

Legend
| G | Goals | K | Kicks | D | Disposals | T | Tackles |
| B | Behinds | H | Handballs | M | Marks |

| Season | Team | No. | Games | Totals | | | | | | | Averages (per game) | | | | | | | Votes |
| Season | Team | No. | Games | G | B | K | H | D | M | T | G | B | K | H | D | M | T | Votes |
|---|---|---|---|---|---|---|---|---|---|---|---|---|---|---|---|---|---|---|
| 2020 (Note: The 2020 season was played with 17 home-and-away matches per team (down from 22) and 16-minute quarters with time on (down from 20-minute quarters with time on) due to the impact of the COVID-19 pandemic.) | Sydney | 1 | 2 | 0 | 0 | 9 | 5 | 14 | 3 | 3 | 0.0 | 0.0 | 4.5 | 2.5 | 7.0 | 1.5 | 1.5 | 0 |
| 2021 | Sydney | 1 | 13 | 8 | 5 | 135 | 81 | 216 | 31 | 48 | 0.6 | 0.4 | 10.4 | 6.2 | 16.6 | 2.4 | 3.7 | 1 |
| 2022 | Sydney | 1 | 24 | 20 | 24 | 327 | 220 | 547 | 80 | 97 | 0.8 | 1.0 | 13.6 | 9.2 | 22.8 | 3.3 | 4.0 | 12 |
| 2023 | Sydney | 1 | 21 | 15 | 15 | 309 | 209 | 518 | 65 | 90 | 0.7 | 0.7 | 14.7 | 10.0 | 24.7 | 3.1 | 4.3 | 16 |
| 2024 | Sydney | 1 | 25 | 35 | 19 | 361 | 226 | 587 | 104 | 79 | 1.4 | 0.8 | 14.4 | 9.0 | 23.5 | 4.2 | 3.2 | 23 |
| 2025 | Sydney | 1 | 23 | 20 | 19 | 330 | 180 | 510 | 91 | 81 | 0.9 | 0.8 | 14.3 | 7.8 | 22.2 | 4.0 | 3.5 | 21 |
| 2026 | Sydney | 1 | 21 | 31 | 23 | 297 | 194 | 491 | 65 | 75 | 1.5 | 1.1 | 14.1 | 9.2 | 23.4 | 3.1 | 3.6 | 0 |
| Career | | | 129 | 129 | 105 | 1768 | 1115 | 2883 | 439 | 473 | 1.0 | 0.8 | 13.7 | 8.6 | 22.3 | 3.4 | 3.7 | 73 |

== Honours and achievements ==
Team

- Minor Premiership: 2024 (Sydney Swans)
- McClelland Trophy: 2026 (Sydney Swans)

Individual

- AFL Rising Star nominee: 2021 (round 3)
- All-Australian team: 2024
- 2x Goodes–O'Loughlin Medal: 2023, 2024
- Brett Kirk Medal: 2025 (game 1)
