= Inglisville =

Community in Nova Scotia, Canada

Coordinates: 44°51′22.44″N 65°6′45.43″W

Inglisville in Nova Scotia

Inglisville is a community in the Canadian province of Nova Scotia, located in Annapolis County.
