= Paul Rowlands =

Australian rules footballer

Personal information
- Born: 28 May 1949 (age 77)
- Original team: Kyabram
- Height: 185 cm (6 ft 1 in)
- Weight: 85.5 kg (188 lb)

Playing career^{1}
Years	Club	Games (Goals)
1969–70	Melbourne	35 (0)
- ^{1} Playing statistics correct to the end of 1970.

Paul Rowlands (born 28 May 1949) is a former Australian rules footballer who played with Melbourne in the Victorian Football League (VFL).
