= Peter Aitken (Australian footballer) =

Australian rules footballer

Personal information
- Full name: Peter Aitken
- Born: 11 November 1934
- Died: 4 December 2025 (aged 91)
- Original team: Kyabram
- Height: 175 cm (5 ft 9 in)
- Weight: 62.5 kg (138 lb)

Playing career^{1}
Years	Club	Games (Goals)
1955	Carlton	11 (7)
- ^{1} Playing statistics correct to the end of 1955.

Peter Aitken (11 November 1934 – 4 December 2025) was an Australian rules footballer who played with Carlton in the Victorian Football League (VFL).
