= Graywood =

Community in Nova Scotia, Canada

Coordinates: 44°38′53.3″N 65°26′52.66″W

Graywood in Nova Scotia

Graywood is a community in the Canadian province of Nova Scotia, located in Annapolis County. It is on Nova Scotia Trunk 8 at an elevation of approximately 180m.
