= Litchfield, Nova Scotia =

Community in Nova Scotia, Canada

Coordinates: 44°46′44.96″N 65°36′23.05″W

Litchfield in Nova Scotia

Litchfield is a community in the Canadian province of Nova Scotia, located in Annapolis County.
