= Maurie Fowler =

Australian rules footballer

Personal information
- Full name: Maurice John Fowler
- Born: 10 August 1944
- Died: 8 May 2017 (aged 72)
- Original team: Kyabram
- Height: 180 cm (5 ft 11 in)
- Weight: 72 kg (159 lb)

Playing career^{1}
| Years | Club | Games (Goals) |
| 1966 | Carlton | 8 (4) |
- ^{1} Playing statistics correct to the end of 1966.

Maurice John Fowler (10 August 1944 – 8 May 2017) was an Australian rules footballer who played for the Carlton Football Club in the Victorian Football League (VFL). He also played 120 games for the Kyabram Football Club.

In 1967 he was cleared to Footscray but later that year transferred to Williamstown in the VFA without playing a senior game for Footscray. In his one season with the VFA Seagulls in 1967, he played 16 games and kicked 15 goals. He then returned to the Goulburn Valley Football Netball League, playing one season with Mooroopna and one season with Kyabram, before accepting the position as playing coach of the Palm Beach Currumbin Football Club on the Queensland Gold Coast in 1970.

He coached Palm Beach Currumbin to 2 premierships between 1970 & 1974 before returning to Victoria as playing coach of the Robinvale Football Club in the Sunraysia Football League.

After only 1 season at Robinvale where the club finished third, Fowler was appointed playing coach of the Hay (NSW) Football Club in the Mid Murray Football League. Within six months Fowler was appointed General Manager of the Hay Services Club.

Fowler retired as a player in 1977 but continued to coach Hay before accepting the position of General Manager of the Cobram-Barooga Golf Club on the NSW – Victorian border. During his time at Cobram Fowler returned to coaching in 1982 & 1983, taking Cobram into their first Murray League Grand Final appearance in 9 years.

In 2016 he was diagnosed with motor neuron disease and died less than a year later.
