= Ross Dillon =

Australian rules footballer

Personal information
- Born: 10 December 1947 (age 78)
- Original team: Kyabram (GVFL)
- Height: 187 cm (6 ft 2 in)
- Weight: 84 kg (185 lb)

Playing career^{1}
Years	Club	Games (Goals)
1966–1972	Melbourne	85 (133)
- ^{1} Playing statistics correct to the end of 1972.

Career highlights
- Melbourne leading goalkicker: 1969 & 1970

Ross Dillon (born 10 December 1947) is a former Australian rules footballer who played for Melbourne in the Victorian Football League (VFL).

A forward, Dillon topped Melbourne's goalkicking in 1969 with 48 goals and again the following season with 41. He joined Norwood in the South Australian National Football League (SANFL) in 1973 and won their best and fairest award in his third season at the club. Dillon represented both Victoria and South Australia at interstate football during his career.
