= John Sparks (footballer) =

Australian rules footballer

Personal information
- Full name: David Sparks
- Born: 5 January 1957 (age 69)
- Original team: Kyabram
- Height: 174 cm (5 ft 9 in)
- Weight: 66 kg (146 lb)

Playing career^{1}
Years	Club	Games (Goals)
1975, 1977	Melbourne	9 (8)
- ^{1} Playing statistics correct to the end of 1977.

David "John" Sparks (born 5 January 1957) is a former Australian rules footballer who played with Melbourne in the Victorian Football League (VFL).
