= Corey Warner =

Australian rules footballer

Personal information
- Born: 7 October 2003 (age 23); Perth, Western Australia
- Original team: East Fremantle (WAFL)
- Draft: No. 40, 2021 national draft
- Debut: Round 5 2023, Sydney vs. Richmond, at Adelaide Oval
- Height: 182 cm (6 ft 0 in)
- Weight: 77 kg (170 lb)
- Position: Midfielder

Club information
- Current club: Sydney
- Number: 37

Playing career^{1}
Years	Club	Games (Goals)
2022–	Sydney	28 (12)
- ^{1} Playing statistics correct to the end of round 22, 2026.

Corey Warner (born 7 October 2003) is an Australian rules footballer who plays for the Sydney Swans in the Australian Football League (AFL).

The younger brother of Chad Warner, he was recruited by the Sydney Swans with pick no. 40 in the 2021 national draft after recording four top-10 performances at the AFL Draft Combine.

== AFL career ==
=== Sydney: (2022–) ===
Warner debuted in Round 5 of the 2023 AFL season for the Sydney Swans. In that game, he kicked his first AFL goal and finished had 8 disposals and 5 handballs in his first AFL win. Warner finished his second season at Sydney after playing his first 3 games and kicking his first career goal.

Warner played his first match of the 2024 AFL season for Sydney in round 2 in a 30 point win against Essendon at home. Warner collected a career high 11 disposals and however wasn't efficient on goals kicking 0 goals and 3 behinds.

== Statistics ==
Updated to the end of round 22, 2026.

Legend
G	Goals	K	Kicks	D	Disposals	T	Tackles
B	Behinds	H	Handballs	M	Marks

Season	Team	No.	Games	Totals							Averages (per game)							Votes
Season	Team	No.	Games	G	B	K	H	D	M	T	G	B	K	H	D	M	T	Votes
2022	Sydney	37	0	—	—	—	—	—	—	—	—	—	—	—	—	—	—	0
2023	Sydney	37	3	1	0	6	6	12	3	4	0.3	0.0	2.0	2.0	4.0	1.0	1.3	0
2024	Sydney	37	6	1	4	23	26	49	6	5	0.2	0.7	3.8	4.3	8.2	1.0	0.8	0
2025	Sydney	37	14	8	8	105	63	168	42	24	0.6	0.6	7.5	4.5	12.0	3.0	1.7	0
2026	Sydney	37	5	2	1	31	24	55	7	6	0.4	0.2	6.2	4.8	11.0	1.4	1.2	0
Career			28	12	13	165	119	284	58	39	0.4	0.5	5.9	4.3	10.1	2.1	1.4	0
