= St. Croix Cove =

Community in Nova Scotia, Canada

Coordinates: 44°55′0.05″N 65°18′11.39″W

St. Croix Cove in Nova Scotia

St. Croix Cove is a community in the Canadian province of Nova Scotia, located in Annapolis County. It is named for Captain St. Croix who settled here c.1772. It s a peaceful and beautiful community of about 100 souls. The Bay of Fundy is the front door, the North Mountain is the back door.
