= James Jordon =

Australian rules footballer (born 2000)

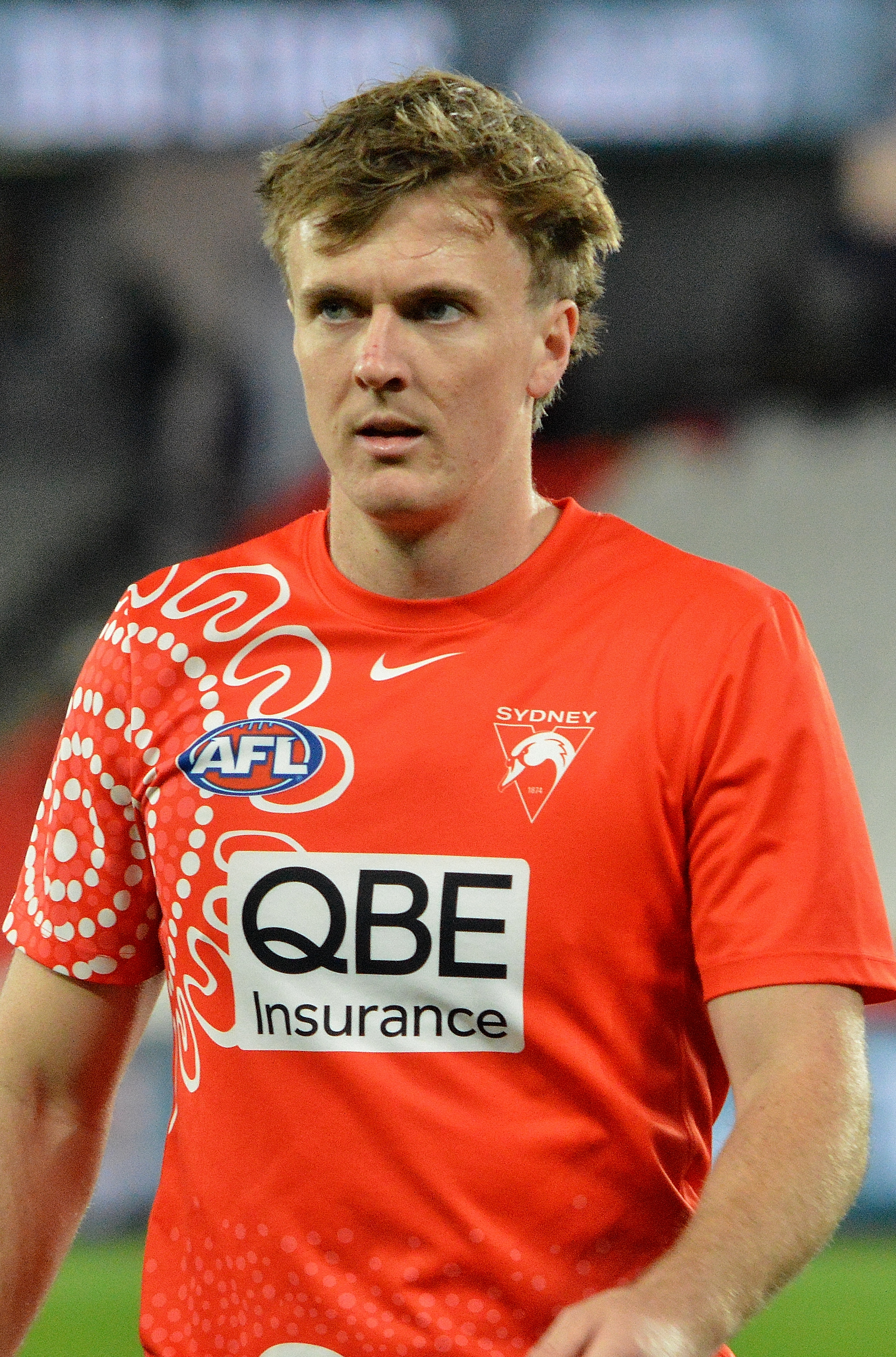
- Jordon with Sydney in August 2026

Personal information
- Born: 20 December 2000 (age 25)
- Original teams: Federal (UMFL), Yarrawonga (OMFNL), Caulfield Grammar (APS), Oakleigh Chargers (NAB League)
- Draft: Pick 33, 2018 AFL draft
- Height: 187 cm (6 ft 2 in)
- Weight: 82 kg (181 lb)

Club information
- Current club: Sydney
- Number: 17

Playing career^{1}
Years	Club	Games (Goals)
2019–2023	Melbourne	65 (17)
2024–	Sydney	70 (24)
Total		133 (41)
- ^{1} Playing statistics correct to the end of round 22, 2026.

Career highlights
- AFL premiership player: 2021; AFL Rising Star nominee: 2021

James Jordon (born 20 December 2000) is an Australian rules footballer who plays for the Sydney Swans in the Australian Football League (AFL).

Jordon was drafted by Melbourne with pick 33, in the 2018 AFL draft. Jordon made his AFL debut in the Demons' 22-point victory against Fremantle at the MCG in round one, 2021. He moved as an unrestricted free agent to Sydney in October 2023.

Jordan's father Darryl was a prolific goalkicker in both the Upper Murray Football League with Federal Football Club and also with Walbundrie Football Club in the Hume Football League, kicking approximately 1700 goals which included nine centuries of goals.

On 19 August 2026, Jordon was one of five Sydney players suspended by the club for the remainder of the 2026 AFL season after an incident inside a hotel room in Melbourne. A report of sexual assault was made by a woman who was in the hotel room, although it has not been suggested in media reports that any of the players are being accused of sexual assault.

== Statistics ==
Updated to the end of round 22, 2026.

Legend
G	Goals	K	Kicks	D	Disposals	T	Tackles
B	Behinds	H	Handballs	M	Marks

Season	Team	No.	Games	Totals							Averages (per game)							Votes
Season	Team	No.	Games	G	B	K	H	D	M	T	G	B	K	H	D	M	T	Votes
2021^{#}	Melbourne	23	25	6	6	178	185	363	64	97	0.2	0.2	7.1	7.4	14.5	2.6	3.9	0
2022 (Note: 2022 statistics include one game in which Jordon was a used medical substitute (round 23).)	Melbourne	23	22	7	3	233	212	445	83	43	0.3	0.1	10.6	9.6	20.2	3.8	2.0	0
2023 (Note: 2023 statistics include six games in which Jordon was a used substitute (rounds 4, 5, 9, 10, 11 & 13) and 2 games in which Jordon was substituted out (rounds 15 & 22).)	Melbourne	23	18	4	3	113	122	235	46	37	0.2	0.2	6.3	6.8	13.1	2.6	2.1	0
2024	Sydney	17	26	9	10	179	203	382	85	85	0.3	0.4	6.9	7.8	14.7	3.3	3.3	0
2025	Sydney	17	23	10	8	156	178	334	46	85	0.4	0.3	6.8	7.7	14.5	2.0	3.7	0
2026	Sydney	17	21	5	3	128	192	320	41	82	0.2	0.1	6.1	9.1	15.2	2.0	3.9	0
Career			135	41	33	987	1092	2079	365	429	0.3	0.2	7.3	8.1	15.4	2.7	3.2	0

== Honours and achievements ==
Team

- AFL premiership player (Melbourne): 2021
- AFL minor premiership (Melbourne): 2021
- 2x McClelland Trophy (Melbourne): 2021, (Sydney) 2026

Individual

- AFL Rising Star nominee: 2021 (Round 8)
