= Darryl Herrod =

Australian rules footballer

Personal information
- Full name: Darryl Herrod
- Born: 2 June 1945 (age 81)
- Original teams: Federal, Assumption College
- Height: 179 cm (5 ft 10 in)
- Weight: 81 kg (179 lb)

Playing career^{1}
Years	Club	Games (Goals)
1966–1967	Geelong	7 (0)
1968–1971	Fitzroy	47 (1)
Total		54 (1)
- ^{1} Playing statistics correct to the end of 1971.

Darryl Herrod (born 2 June 1945) is a former Australian rules footballer who played with Geelong and Fitzroy in the Victorian Football League (VFL).

Herrod came to Geelong from Assumption College, in Kilmore via Federal in the Upper Murray Football League. He played 75 VFL reserves matches and won the Gardiner Medal in 1966, but managed just seven senior games in his two seasons with Geelong.

At Fitzroy he put together regular senior appearances, with his most productive season coming in 1970 when he appeared in 19 rounds.

A half back flanker, he spent 1972 and 1973 in Tasmania, with the North Hobart Football Club. He then joined Port Melbourne, as he was a good friend of former Fitzroy teammate and new Port coach Norm Brown.
