= Percy Outram =

Australian rules footballer, born 1903

Personal information
- Full name: Percy Dwight Outram
- Born: 21 May 1903; Kyabram, Victoria
- Died: 3 November 1981 (aged 78)
- Original team: Kyabram / Wesley College
- Height: 178 cm (5 ft 10 in)
- Weight: 76 kg (168 lb)

Playing career^{1}
Years	Club	Games (Goals)
1925–27	Carlton	24 (43)
1928–30	St Kilda	27 (51)
Total		51 (94)
- ^{1} Playing statistics correct to the end of 1930.

Percy Dwight Outram (21 May 1903 – 3 November 1981) was an Australian rules footballer who played with Carlton and St Kilda in the Victorian Football League (VFL). He was a small and elusive forward recruited from Kyabram.

== VFL career ==
He made his senior debut with a win against Richmond at Princes Park in round 7, 1925. Outram was in and out of the senior team for the next three seasons. Disappointed of being dropped on the eve of finals after kicking 4 goals, he received offers from St. Kilda and requested a transfer. His 27 games for the Saints produced 51 goals, including two when St Kilda lost to Carlton in the 1929 first Semi Final.

Outram retired after the 1930 season and volunteered for active service at the outbreak of World War II in 1939, and spent four years in uniform.

== Family ==
Brother of former Collingwood and Richmond player, Roy Outram. Like his brother, Percy was the leading goalkicker in the Goulburn Valley FA in 1923 and 1924. His brother Roy was leading goalkicker in 1926 and 1927.
