= Outram, Nova Scotia =

Community in Nova Scotia, Canada

Coordinates: 44°57′15.45″N 65°12′46.02″W

Outram in Nova Scotia

Outram is a community in the Canadian province of Nova Scotia, located in Annapolis County.
