= Youngs Cove, Nova Scotia =

Community in Nova Scotia, Canada

Coordinates: 44°51′54.42″N 65°26′26.7″W

Youngs Cove in Nova Scotia

Youngs Cove is a community in the Canadian province of Nova Scotia, located in Annapolis County on the shore of the Bay of Fundy.
