= Frank Hanna (footballer, born 1893) =

Australian rules footballer (1893–1967)

Personal information
- Full name: Frank James Hanna
- Born: 7 March 1893; Ascot Vale, Victoria
- Died: 23 June 1967 (aged 74); Essendon, Victoria
- Original team: North Melbourne (VFA)
- Height: 174 cm (5 ft 9 in)
- Weight: 71 kg (157 lb)
- Position: Rover

Playing career^{1}
| Years | Club | Games (Goals) |
| 1913–14 | Carlton | 3 (1) |
- ^{1} Playing statistics correct to the end of 1914.

Frank James Hanna (7 March 1893 – 23 June 1967) was an Australian rules footballer who played with Carlton in the Victorian Football League (VFL). During the 1914 season he transferred to Hawthorn in the Victorian Football Association where he played until the end of the 1915 season.

He enlisted in the Australian Imperial Force in February 1916 and served in the Australian 119th Field Artillery (Howitzer) Battery as a gunner before becoming a driver, and reaching the rank of corporal, in the Australian Army Motor Transport Company.
