= Roy Outram =

Australian rules footballer, born 1901

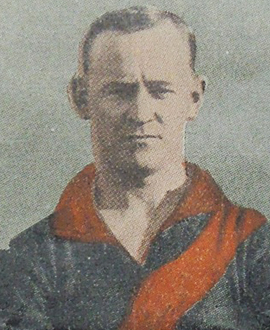

Personal information
- Full name: Alexander Roy Outram
- Born: 19 February 1901; Kyneton, Victoria
- Died: 27 March 1987 (aged 86); Kyneton, Victoria
- Original team: Kyabram
- Height: 178 cm (5 ft 10 in)
- Weight: 76 kg (168 lb)

Playing career^{1}
Years	Club	Games (Goals)
1920	Collingwood	1 (0)
1928	Richmond	4 (2)
Total		5 (2)
- ^{1} Playing statistics correct to the end of 1928.

Alexander Roy Outram (19 February 1901 – 27 March 1987) was an Australian rules footballer who played with Collingwood and Richmond in the Victorian Football League (VFL).

Outram was recruited from Kyabram, in the Goulburn Valley Football League. He played one game at Collingwood before returning home to Kyabram. Encouraged by his younger brother, Percy, he tried again in 1928 but this time with Richmond where he played 4 games. He didn't like city live and returned home to Kyabram.

Outram won the 1927 - Goulburn Valley Football League goal kicking award.

Brother of former St Kilda and Carlton Football Club player Percy Outram.
