= Trevor Castles =

Australian rules footballer

Personal information
- Full name: Trevor Castles
- Born: 19 April 1961 (age 65)
- Original team: Kyabram
- Height: 179 cm (5 ft 10 in)
- Weight: 76 kg (168 lb)

Playing career^{1}
Years	Club	Games (Goals)
1982–1984	Melbourne	1 (0)
- ^{1} Playing statistics correct to the end of 1983.

Trevor Castles (born 19 April 1961) is a former Australian rules footballer who played with Melbourne in the Victorian Football League (VFL).
