= Frank Hanna (footballer, born 1924) =

Australian rules footballer (1924–2010)

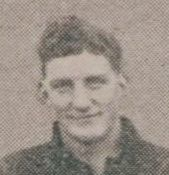

Personal information
- Full name: Frank Hanna
- Born: 5 April 1924; Walwa, Victoria
- Died: 28 November 2010 (aged 86); Burnie, Tasmania
- Original team: Walwa
- Height / weight: 189 cm / 85 kg
- Position: Ruckman

Playing career^{1}
| Years | Club | Games (Goals) |
| 1947–49 | Melbourne | 30 (3) |
- ^{1} Playing statistics correct to the end of 1949.

Frank Hanna (5 April 1924 – 28 November 2010) was an Australian rules footballer who played with Melbourne in the Victorian Football League (VFL).

In 1948 he was badly injured when Jack Dyer strongly bumped him, breaking his collarbone and suffering a concussion. He was carried from the ground on the stretcher and Dyer played the remainder of the game thinking he had killed Hanna.

In 1949 he coached the Horsham Football Club before moving to Tasmania in 1950 to coach Yeoman Football Club and then Burnie Football Club from 1951.
