= CYG =

CYG or Cyg or variant, may refer to:

- Cygnus (constellation) abbreviation
- Commonwealth Youth Games
- Corryong Airport IATA airport code
