= Corryong =

Town in Victoria, Australia

- Town
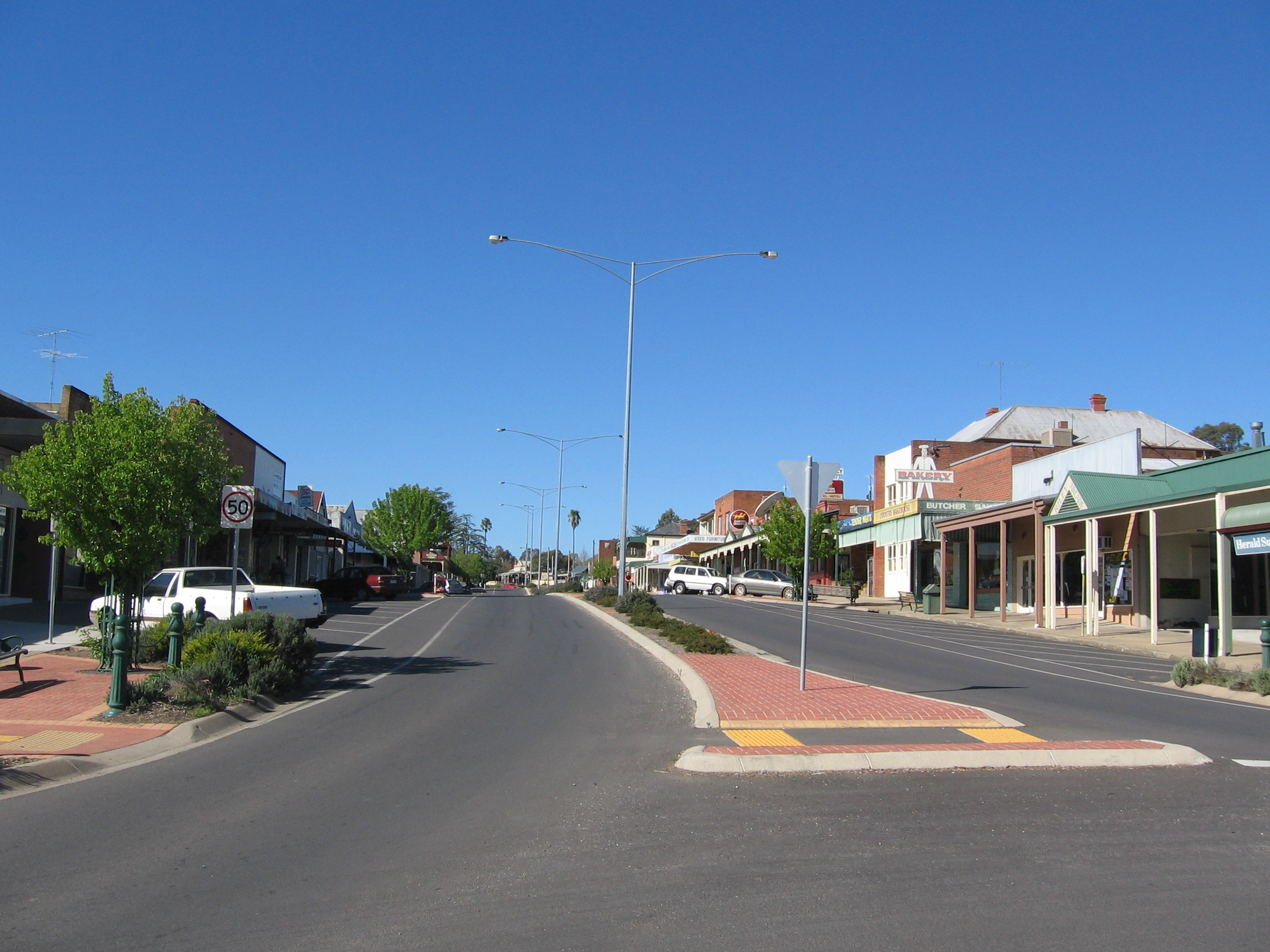
- Hansen St, the main street of Corryong

- Interactive map of Corryong
- Coordinates: 36°11′53″S 147°53′58″E
- Country: Australia
- State: Victoria
- Region: Hume
- LGA: Shire of Towong
- Location: 431 km (268 mi) NE of Melbourne; 120 km (75 mi) E of Wodonga; 71 km (44 mi) SSW of Tumbarumba

Government
  - State electorate: Benambra
  - Federal division: Indi
- Elevation: 313.5 m (1,029 ft)

Population
  - Total: 1,348 (2016 census)
- Postcode: 3707
- Mean max temp: 21.2 °C (70.2 °F)
- Mean min temp: 7.4 °C (45.3 °F)
- Annual rainfall: 775.6 mm (30.54 in)

Corryong is a town in Victoria, Australia, 120 kilometres (75 mi) east of Albury-Wodonga, near the upper reaches of the Murray River and close to the New South Wales border. At the 2016 census, Corryong had a population of 1,348.

The post office opened on 1 February 1874. The town also has its own airport.

Corryong hosts The Man from Snowy River Bush Festival, held annually in April.

== Education ==
Corryong is supported by a variety of service clubs, a hospital and schools. It has a Catholic primary and Corryong College P-12 school. The college has approximately 300(2019) students. Corryong is also home to the Australian Institute of Flexible Learning (AIFL), which offers 100% online education to all of Australia.

== Geography ==
Its location makes it the Victorian gateway to the New South Wales snowfields, including the Thredbo ski village, and the Snowy Mountains Scheme. It is a way station for many travellers, particularly those on motorcycles, travelling across Australia's highest mountains. Other tourists come to fish in the river and other nearby waterways, or to partake in horseriding around the mountain areas surrounding the town.

It is also of note as the home of Jack Riley, a hermit stockman employed by John Pierce of Greg Greg Station for 23 years to run cattle at Tom Groggin 60 kilometres (37 mi) upriver from Khancoban. The local government uses this claim extensively in its tourist promotions, and holds The Man from Snowy River Bush Festival annually

Corryong is close to the Burrowa-Pine Mountain National Park and the massive Alpine National Park. The Kosciuszko National Park is located nearby across the state border. Both of these areas were extensively burnt in the bushfires which raged through the region in January 2003 and in the summer of 2019/20.

== Industry ==
Industries in the area involve mainly agriculture and forestry, particularly beef and dairy farming. The forestry industries include both the harvesting of native eucalypts and of the extensive pine plantations in the area, which extend along a general high-rainfall zone from Tumbarumba in the north-east to Shelley in the south-west.

== Climate ==
Corryong has a borderline oceanic / humid subtropical climate (Köppen Cfb / Cfa) with warm to hot, dry summers that are chilly by morning and cool, wet winters with persistent cloud cover. The seasonal range of maximum temperatures between January and July, is especially marked. Sleet occurs in winter and snow may also occur.

Climate data for Corryong (Parish Lane, 1972–2006, rainfall to 1891); 314 m AMSL; 36.20° S, 147.90° E
Month	Jan	Feb	Mar	Apr	May	Jun	Jul	Aug	Sep	Oct	Nov	Dec	Year
Record high °C (°F)	41.6 (106.9)	40.8 (105.4)	38.0 (100.4)	34.5 (94.1)	27.1 (80.8)	21.6 (70.9)	18.6 (65.5)	24.6 (76.3)	27.8 (82.0)	32.4 (90.3)	38.8 (101.8)	40.5 (104.9)	41.6 (106.9)
Mean daily maximum °C (°F)	30.7 (87.3)	30.5 (86.9)	27.3 (81.1)	21.7 (71.1)	16.3 (61.3)	11.9 (53.4)	11.4 (52.5)	13.8 (56.8)	17.2 (63.0)	20.9 (69.6)	24.6 (76.3)	28.1 (82.6)	21.2 (70.2)
Mean daily minimum °C (°F)	13.6 (56.5)	13.6 (56.5)	10.6 (51.1)	7.0 (44.6)	4.4 (39.9)	2.4 (36.3)	1.8 (35.2)	2.7 (36.9)	4.8 (40.6)	6.8 (44.2)	9.3 (48.7)	11.6 (52.9)	7.4 (45.3)
Record low °C (°F)	4.2 (39.6)	4.0 (39.2)	2.4 (36.3)	−1.5 (29.3)	−3.2 (26.2)	−5.0 (23.0)	−5.3 (22.5)	−4.8 (23.4)	−2.8 (27.0)	−1.2 (29.8)	0.0 (32.0)	2.9 (37.2)	−5.3 (22.5)
Average precipitation mm (inches)	51.0 (2.01)	44.5 (1.75)	53.3 (2.10)	50.9 (2.00)	62.5 (2.46)	77.4 (3.05)	80.3 (3.16)	81.6 (3.21)	70.8 (2.79)	80.2 (3.16)	62.8 (2.47)	59.5 (2.34)	775.6 (30.54)
Average precipitation days (≥ 0.2mm)	6.0	5.5	6.3	7.2	10.0	12.7	13.6	13.6	11.8	10.8	8.3	7.2	113.0
Average afternoon relative humidity (%)	35	36	36	48	61	71	69	60	55	50	43	37	50
Mean monthly sunshine hours	303.8	268.4	257.3	210.0	145.7	99.0	108.5	136.4	177.0	235.6	261.0	269.7	2,472.4
Source 1: Corryong (Parish Lane, 1972–2006)
Source 2: Khancoban SMHEA (sunshine hours, 1962–1994)

The airport site is somewhat lower and flatter than the now-decommissioned town site, attaining greater extremes in temperature. Since 2006 there is a general increase in rainfall with a newfound tendency to fall in the summer months (though still retaining a winter peak).

Climate data for Corryong Airport (2006–2023); 290 m AMSL; 36.18° S, 147.89° E
Month	Jan	Feb	Mar	Apr	May	Jun	Jul	Aug	Sep	Oct	Nov	Dec	Year
Record high °C (°F)	44.0 (111.2)	43.6 (110.5)	38.2 (100.8)	32.0 (89.6)	26.5 (79.7)	20.2 (68.4)	19.0 (66.2)	22.8 (73.0)	29.0 (84.2)	35.4 (95.7)	39.1 (102.4)	41.0 (105.8)	44.0 (111.2)
Mean daily maximum °C (°F)	32.2 (90.0)	30.7 (87.3)	27.6 (81.7)	21.8 (71.2)	15.9 (60.6)	12.1 (53.8)	11.8 (53.2)	14.0 (57.2)	18.0 (64.4)	22.3 (72.1)	26.1 (79.0)	29.1 (84.4)	21.8 (71.2)
Mean daily minimum °C (°F)	14.2 (57.6)	13.1 (55.6)	10.9 (51.6)	6.2 (43.2)	3.1 (37.6)	1.7 (35.1)	1.1 (34.0)	1.8 (35.2)	3.3 (37.9)	5.3 (41.5)	9.5 (49.1)	11.7 (53.1)	6.8 (44.3)
Record low °C (°F)	4.2 (39.6)	4.1 (39.4)	1.1 (34.0)	−2.1 (28.2)	−5.0 (23.0)	−6.0 (21.2)	−6.0 (21.2)	−5.0 (23.0)	−4.1 (24.6)	−3.5 (25.7)	−0.6 (30.9)	1.2 (34.2)	−6.0 (21.2)
Average precipitation mm (inches)	64.7 (2.55)	62.7 (2.47)	75.2 (2.96)	49.2 (1.94)	57.4 (2.26)	70.6 (2.78)	81.4 (3.20)	82.4 (3.24)	71.0 (2.80)	50.7 (2.00)	82.6 (3.25)	64.5 (2.54)	811.7 (31.96)
Average precipitation days (≥ 0.2mm)	7.6	7.4	9.4	10.4	19.9	23.9	23.7	20.1	13.4	9.3	10.4	9.2	164.7
Source: Corryong Airport (2006–2023)

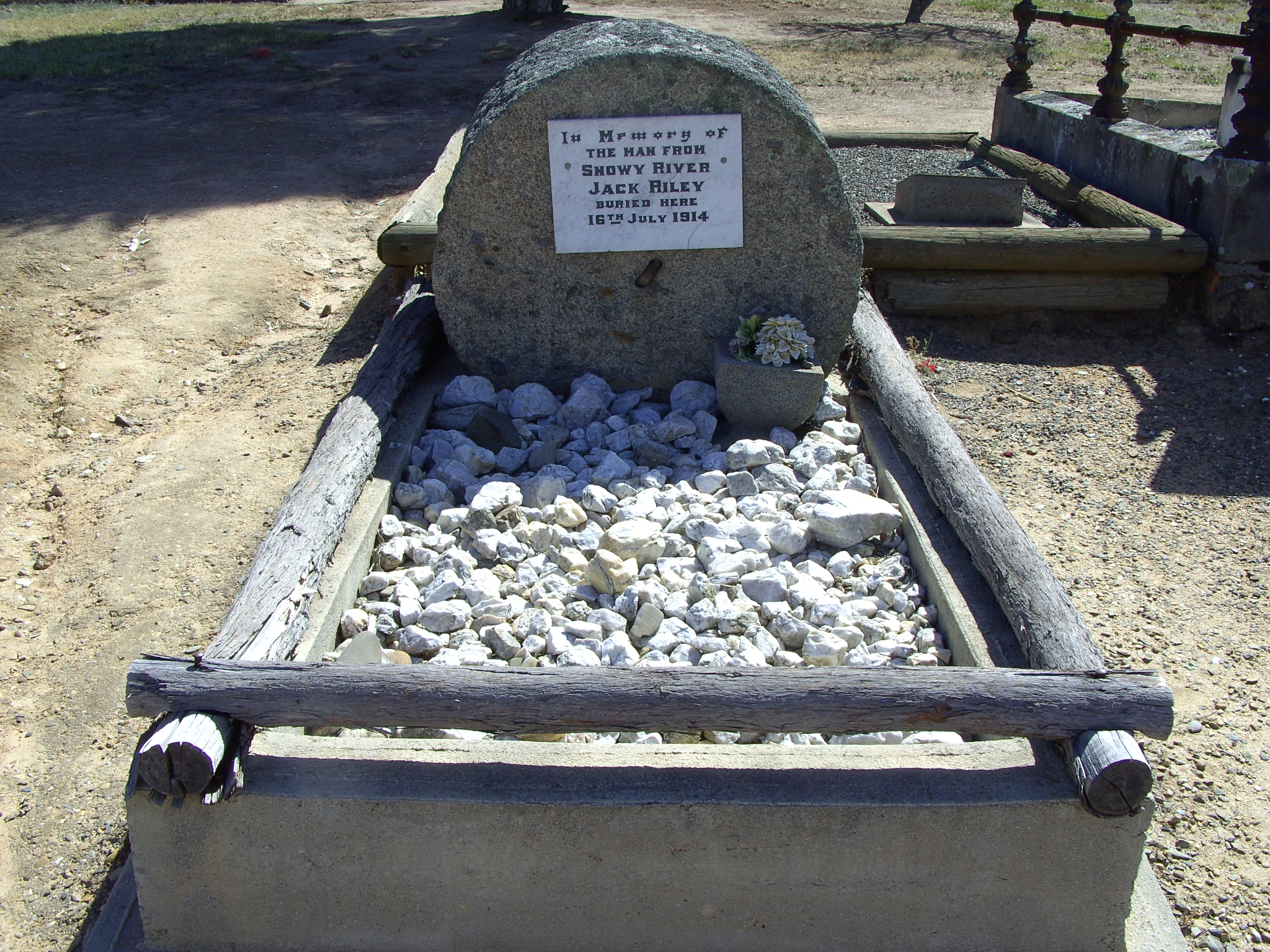
Grave of Jack Riley (1841–1914), The Man from Snowy River, Corryong cemetery

== Sport ==
Golfers play at the Corryong Golf Club on Donaldson Street, a nine-hole course.

The town is the centre of the Upper Murray Football League, an Australian Rules Football competition which began in 1893. Corryong is home to two of the three foundation clubs: Corryong FC, which has been based in the town from 1893 and Federal FC, formerly the Mount Elliot Miners and renamed in 1901 to celebrate the Federation of Australia and moved to be fully based at Corryong around the same time.

=== Historical grandstand ===
The Corryong Recreation Reserve was the home of the Grandstand, known as "The Grand Old Lady" to some locals in the Upper Murray community.

In late 1902 the idea was raised for the possible building of a grandstand at the Corryong Recreation Reserve which would be shared between the Corryong Race Club & the A&P Society (today known as the Corryong & Upper Murray A&P Society Inc.). Fundraising started almost immediately through a range of means including "Bazaars", and by 1905 arrangements were in place to erect the grandstand. On 14 February 1906 an ad was placed calling for tenders, and on 22 June 1906 the contract was let for A£393 with work to proceed shortly.

GRANDSTAND OPENED.
At today's race meeting the new grandstand will receive its initiation. The contractor (Mr. Tom Greenhill) has done his work well, and Corryong may justly claim to have the largest building of the kind outside Albury. The design is elegant and the height of the stand ensures a splendid view over all parts of the course. The Racing Club has completed the fencing of the saddling paddock adjoining, and a new publicans booth and fruit stall have been erected, while the luncheon booth has been removed to a suitable site near the stand. The public will find the new improvements a great advantage and the clubs should benefit accordingly. We trust that the year of 1907 will commence a new era of prosperity for all the local institutions, and that they will continue to work amicably together, for co-operation in these matters lighten the burden on the general public - and that in a small community like ours, is a most important consideration.

— The Corryong Courier: 14 February 1907

Many years passed since the Grandstand was opened before the Corryong Racing Club left, leaving the A&P Society with sole ownership of the grandstand. Additional the neighbouring Towong Turf Club's "Towong Grandstand" was built by Tom Greenhill around the same time and done in a similar style to the "Corryong Grandstand". It's unclear when the Corryong Recreation Reserve was repurposed for football but sometime after both the Corryong Football Club & the Federal Football Club moved here, with each building their own clubrooms.

However, by early 2014, after many years of neglect the grandstand was deemed unsafe to the public, and was fenced off to stop any public access. On 2 September 2014, it was announced that there were plans to demolish the historic 108-year-old Corryong Grandstand as part of plans to refurbish the Towong Grandstand at the Towong Turf Club. The Corryong Grandstand was not heritage listed on either the Australian National Heritage List or the Victorian Heritage Register. After public backlash from the Upper Murray community the Facebook page "Corryong Grandstand - Stand By Me" was established on 29 September 2014 and a petition started on Change.Org. After gathering submissions from members of the community, the group had a meeting with VCAT scheduled for 10 April 2015 in Melbourne, but was later rescheduled for 8 May 2015, in Wodonga. An announcement regarding its fate was scheduled to take place on 1 June 2015. In the 10 September 2015 edition of the Corryong Courier the grandstand made the front page with the headline reading "Last Stand? Death knell sounds for grandstand."

== Notable residents ==
- John M. Hull, a professor of religious education (born in Corryong on 22 April 1935)
- Lee Kernaghan, a country musician (born in Corryong on 15 April 1964)
- Corrine Grant, an actress and comedian (born in Corryong on 12 June 1973)
- Horrie the Wog Dog, a terrier, unofficial mascot of the 2/1st Machine Gun Battalion (died in Corryong 12 March 1945)
- Elyne Mitchell, champion skier, cattlewoman, and author of the Silver Brumby series of children's books (who died in Corryong). The local library is named after her.

== See also ==
- Corryong Airport
- Snowy Mountains Scheme
