= Pine Mountain (Victoria) =

Mountain in Victoria, Australia

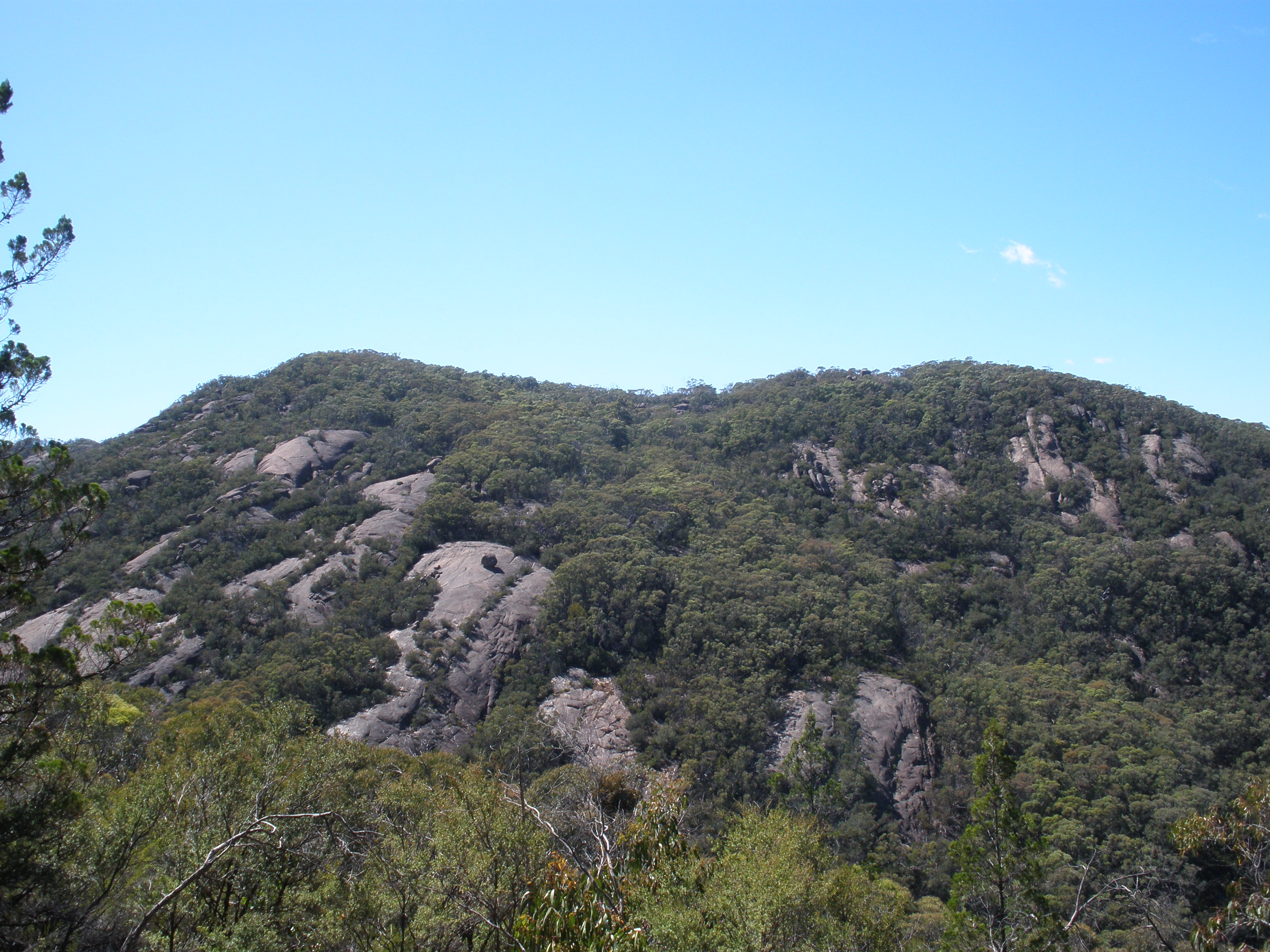
- Looking towards the summit

Highest point
- Coordinates: 36.015°S 147.830°E

Geography
- Location within Shire of Towong
- Location: Victoria, Australia
- Parent range: Great Dividing Range

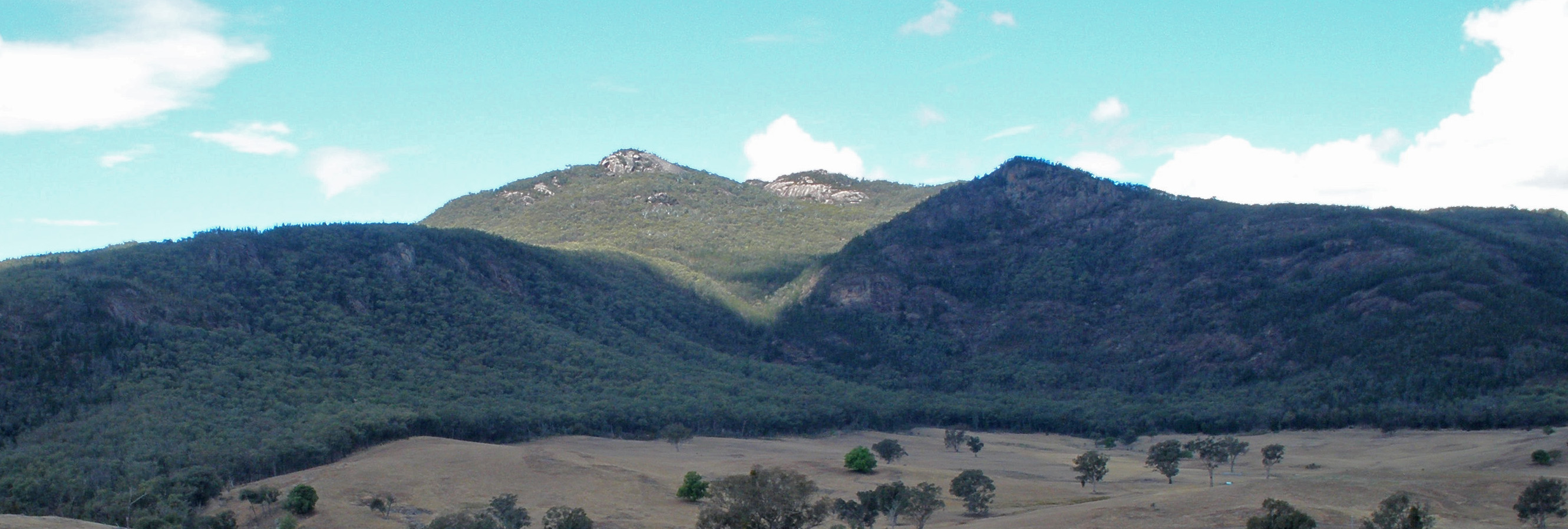
Western side of Pine Mountain (summit not visible)

Pine Mountain is a gigantic monolith, said to be 1.5 times bigger than Uluru, situated in the Burrowa-Pine Mountain National Park in Australia.

== Location ==
The base of Pine Mountain is located 10 km southeast of the small town of Walwa, Victoria which is a 440 km drive northeast of Melbourne or 115 km east of Albury-Wodonga. The mountain is part of the Burrowa-Pine Mountain National Park which offers a large number of 4wd and walking tracks, waterfalls, picnic and camping areas and numerous lookouts. The park's remote and rugged character is a major attraction for visits and also contains Mount Burowa which is 1300m high.

== Geology, flora and fauna ==
Pine Mountain is argued to be the largest monolith in Australia at 1.5 times bigger than Uluru. The gigantic red granite monolith was uplifted to its present height of 1062 m more than 2 million years ago. Since then erosion has highlighted the steep eastern side, established several creeks, and in the upper area, created small rock pools which contain shrimp and tadpoles despite annual drying, and large granite marbles 2-3.5 m in diameter.

The Mountain offers a diverse range of vegetation types. It is of great botanical significance due to its number of rare and threatened plant species. Over 200 native plants have been identified on the mountain, 19 of which are rare or local to the area. Rare plant species include Pine Mountain grevillea (Grevillea jephcottii), fan grevillea (Grevillea ramosissima), broad-leaf hop-bush (Dodonaea rhombifoli) and phantom wattle (Acacia phasmoides). Other vegetation includes black cypress pines and kurrajongs, which fringe the steep granite outcrops.

Animal life is abundant and varied. Black wallabies, eastern grey kangaroos and wombats, possums and gliders are especially numerous. The lyre bird is rarely seen but often heard. Over 180 species of birds have been recorded in the park.

== Walking track ==
From the west side base there is a walking track which traverses large granite outcrops and leads to the summit of Pine Mountain. Access to the walking track is achieved along a 5 km dry weather only 4WD track from the entrance of the park. The walk is difficult and only suited to experienced bushwalkers with advanced navigational skills and a high level of physical fitness. The walk to the summit is long and extremely strenuous with a number of steep rock climbs and descents, it is advised that only fit persons attempt this walk, and rock climbing skills and experience are advised to complete this walk. The weather is capable of changing very rapidly so it is necessary to be prepared with warm and waterproof clothing, high energy food supplies and sufficient water. The reasonably worn walking track is a 12 km trip, 8 hrs return (or longer, especially if less than perfectly fit or weighed down with equipment). It is marked out with numerous markers on trees and cairns (ducks). The track is sometimes poorly defined so it is necessary that a map and compass is carried, and are used by a properly trained and experienced user. The summit area offers panoramic views of the surrounding Murray River Valleys and the Snowy Mountains, NSW. For the less adventurous there is also a small walk of 2 km, 1hr return, to Rocky Knob.

== See also ==
- List of mountains in Australia § Victoria
- Protected areas of Victoria
