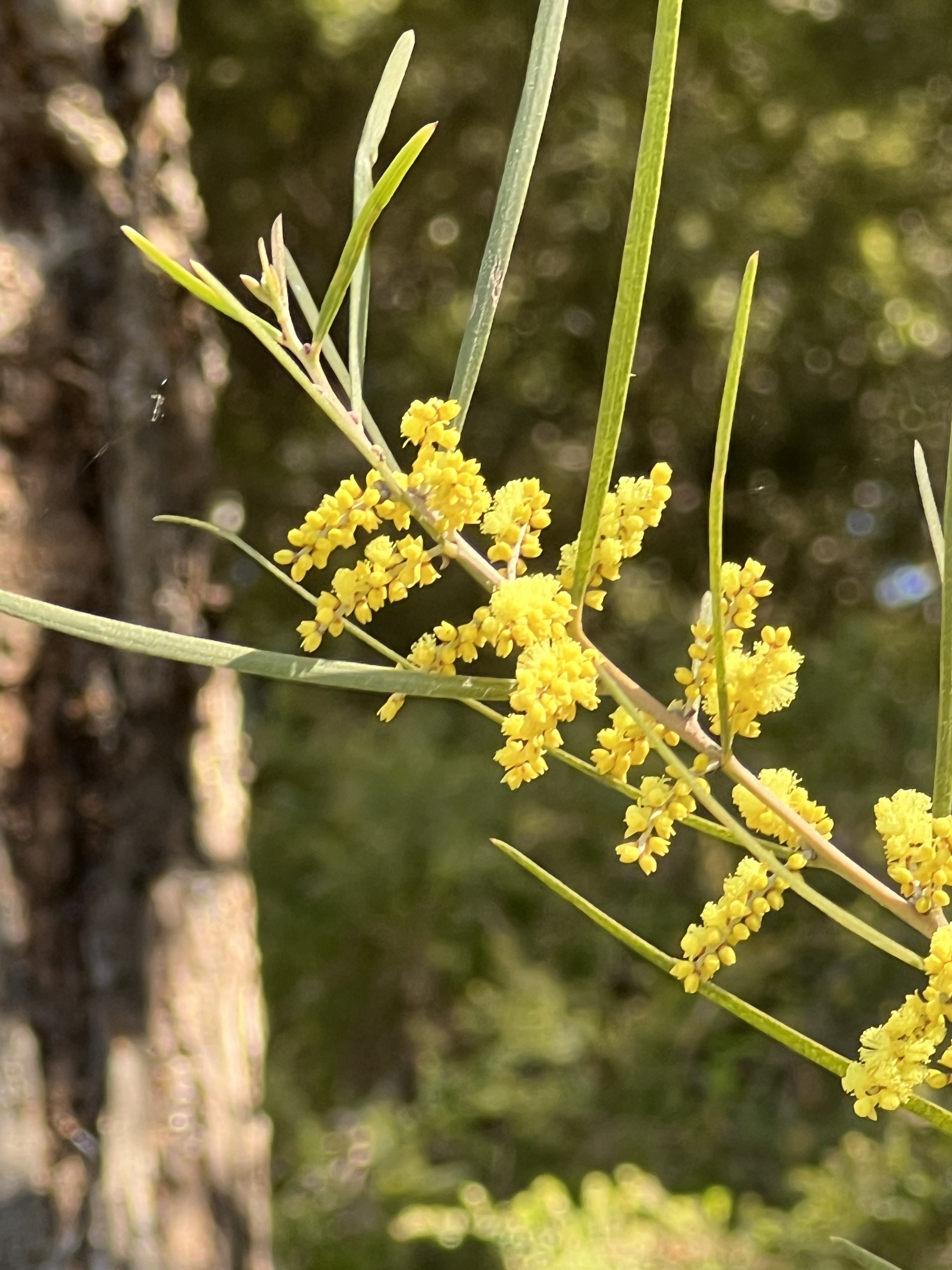

Conservation status
- Vulnerable (EPBC Act)

Scientific classification
- Kingdom: Plantae
- Clade: Tracheophytes
- Clade: Angiosperms
- Clade: Eudicots
- Clade: Rosids
- Order: Fabales
- Family: Fabaceae
- Subfamily: Caesalpinioideae
- Clade: Mimosoid clade
- Genus: Acacia
- Species: A. phasmoides

Binomial name
- Acacia phasmoides J.H.Willis
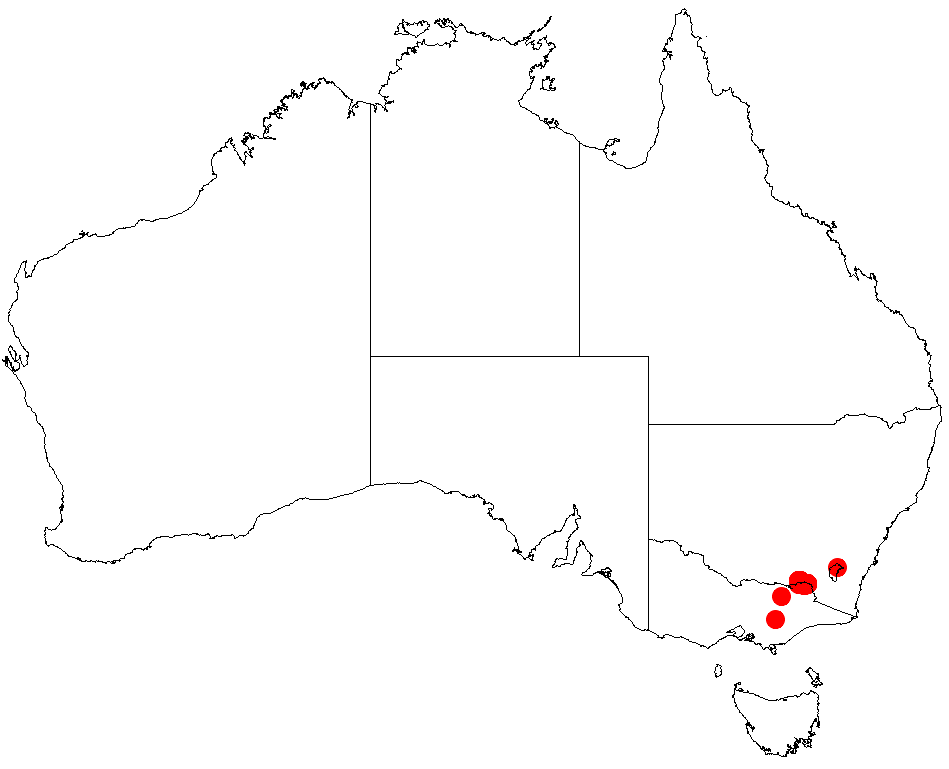
- Occurrence data from AVH

Synonyms
- Racosperma phasmoides (J.H.Willis) Pedley

= Acacia phasmoides =

Phantom wattle

Species of legume

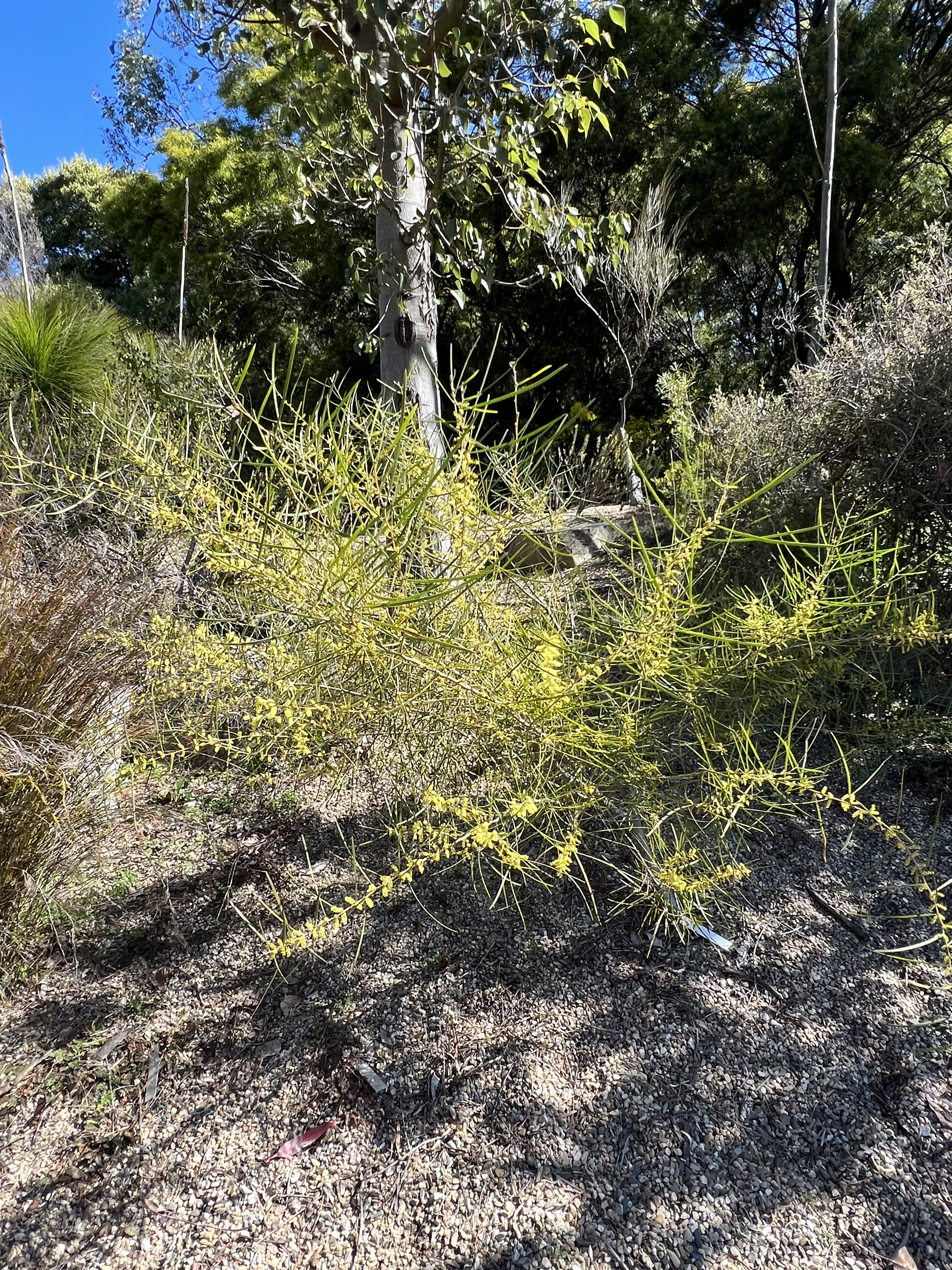
Habit

Acacia phasmoides, the phantom wattle, is a shrub species that is endemic to south-eastern Australia.

== Description ==
It grows to between 1 and 4 metres high and has phyllodes that are 5 to 12.5 cm long and 1 to 2 mm wide. The bright yellow globular flowerheads appear singly or in groups of two in the axils of the phyllodes from September to November, followed by curved seed pods which are 5 to 9 cm long and 2 to 4 mm wide.

== Taxonomy ==
The species was formally described in 1967 by botanist Jim Willis based on plant material collected from Pine Mountain in north-eastern Victoria. It was reclassified as Racosperma phasmoides by Leslie Pedley in 2003 and then transferred back to genus Acacia in 2006.

== Distribution ==
Its distribution is limited to a small area on the border between south-eastern New South Wales and north-eastern Victoria. In New South Wales it is found along the southern edge of Woomargama National Park and has an estimated population of 2000 plants. In Victoria it is found in the Burrowa-Pine Mountain National Park from two stands east of the summit of Pine Mountain with nine plants in one stand and between 150 and 250 in the other. The Victorian populations are located approximately 35 km (22 mi) from the New South Wales populations.

== See also ==
- List of Acacia species
