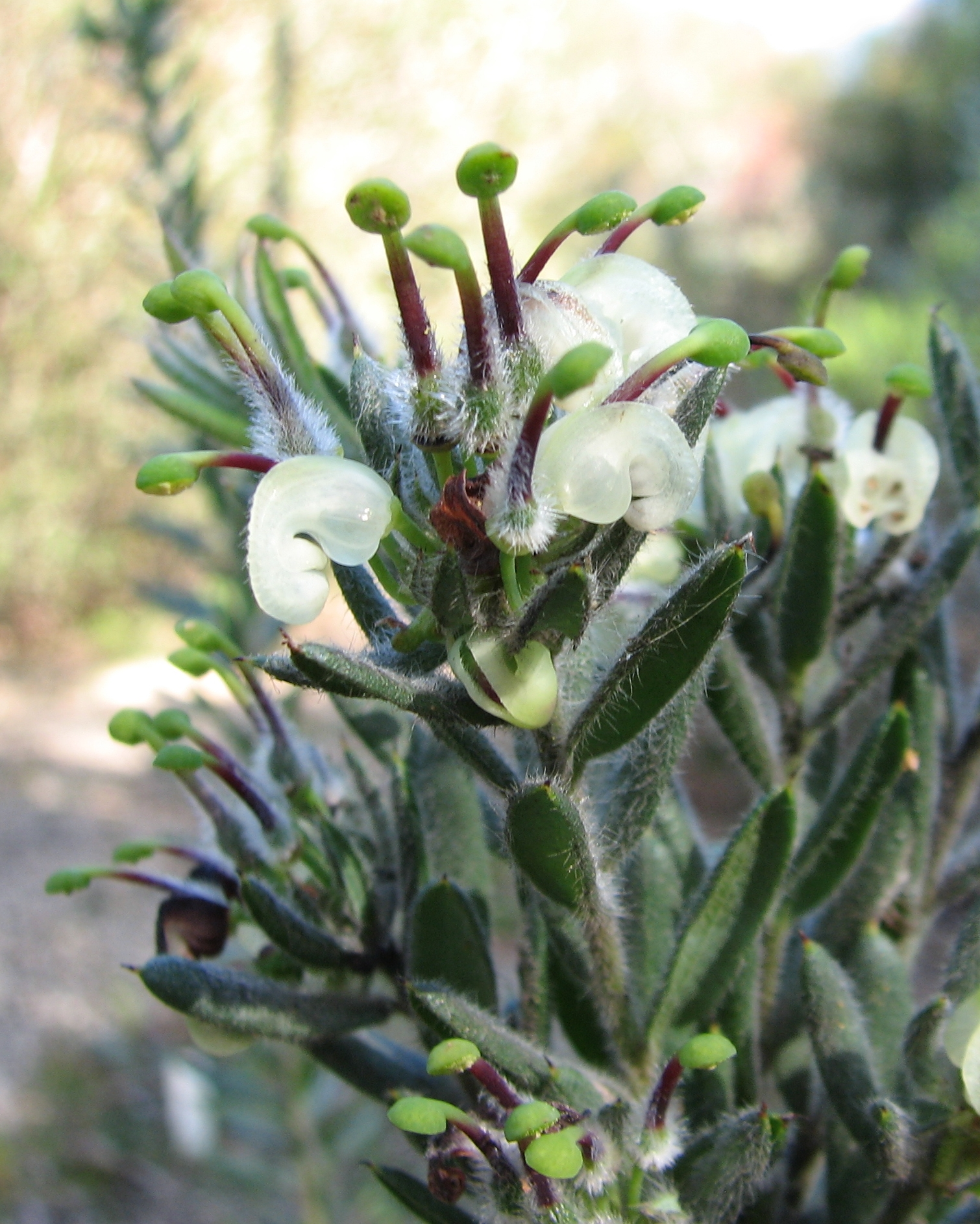
- In Maranoa Gardens

Scientific classification
- Kingdom: Plantae
- Clade: Embryophytes
- Clade: Tracheophytes
- Clade: Angiosperms
- Clade: Eudicots
- Order: Proteales
- Family: Proteaceae
- Genus: Grevillea
- Species: G. jephcottii

Binomial name
- Grevillea jephcottii J.H.Willis

= Grevillea jephcottii =

Pine Mountain grevillea

Species of shrub endemic to Victoria, Australia

Grevillea jephcottii, commonly known as Pine Mountain grevillea, green grevillea or Jephcotts grevillea is a species of flowering plant in the family Proteaceae and is endemic to a restricted area of Victoria. It is a low dense, to tall spindly shrub with narrowly oblong to narrowly elliptic leaves, and clusters of pale lemon or greenish flowers with a purplish style.

== Description ==
Grevillea jephcottii is a low, dense, to erect, spindly shrub that typically grows to a height of 1–3 m (3 ft 3 in – 9 ft 10 in). Its leaves are narrowly oblong to narrowly elliptic, 10–35 mm (0.39–1.38 in) long and 1.5–6 mm (0.059–0.236 in) wide and glabrous when mature. The flowers are usually arranged on the ends of branches in groups of three to eight on a rachis 2–3 mm (0.079–0.118 in) long and are pale lemon or greenish, turning black as they age, the pistil 9.0–19.5 mm (0.35–0.77 in) long and the style purplish with white hairs. Flowering occurs from July to November and the fruit is a narrowly oval follicle 10–15 mm (0.39–0.59 in) long.

== Taxonomy ==
Grevillea jephcottii was first formally described in 1967 by James Hamlyn Willis in the journal Muelleria from specimens he collected on the south-west slopes of Pine Mountain in 1964. The specific epithet (jephcottii), honours the Jephcott family from Ournie, who were the first to collect specimens from the area. Sydney Wheeler Jephcott discovered the plant at the age of 14 in 1878.

== Distribution and habitat ==
Pine Mountain grevillea occurs in a restricted area of north-eastern Victoria between Walwa and Corryong at altitudes ranging between 550 and 650 m (1,800 and 2,130 ft) where it grows in rocky places in dry forest.

== Conservation status ==
The species is listed as 'Endangered' in Victoria under the Flora and Fauna Guarantee Act 1988 and is listed as rare in Victoria on the Department of Sustainability and Environment's Advisory List of Rare Or Threatened Plants In Victoria.
