= Horrie the Wog-dog =

1945 book by Ion Idriess

Horrie the Wog Dog
- First edition
- Author: Ion Idriess; Jim Moody
- Language: English
- Genre: non-fiction
- Publisher: Angus and Robertson
- Publication date: 1945
- Publication place: Australia

Horrie the Wog Dog is a 1945 book by Ion Idriess about the adventures of Horrie the Wog Dog, the Australian war mascot.

Idriess wrote the book based on the diaries of soldier Jim Moody.
