= Roland Perry =

Australian author and historian

Roland John Perry OAM (born 11 October 1946) is an Australian author and historian. His work includes three works of fiction and more than twenty documentary films. His book Monash: The Outsider Who Won the War was awarded the Fellowship of Australian Writers' Melbourne University Publishing Award in 2004 and described as "a model of the biographer's art."

In 2011, Perry was awarded the Medal of the Order of Australia "for services to literature as an author." The same year Monash University awarded him a fellowship for "high achievement as a writer, author, film producer and journalist."

Perry's sports books include biographies of Sir Donald Bradman, Steve Waugh, Keith Miller, and Shane Warne. He has also written on espionage, specialising in the British Cambridge Five ring of Russian agents and he has been a member of the National Archives of Australia Advisory Council since 2006.

In late 2012, Perry accepted an adjunct appointment at Monash University as a professor, with the title Writer-in-Residence, in the university's Arts Faculty.

== Career ==
Roland Perry began his writing career at the age of 22 on The Age, where he worked from January 1969 to June 1973. He studied economics at Monash University, and journalism and journalism law at Melbourne University. He won the Exhibition Prize in Journalism at Melbourne in 1969, and was awarded the Frederick Blackham Scholarship Award.

Perry told ABC Radio's Australia Overnights program on 16 August 2008 that he was

fortunate to have strong mentors at the beginning of my career. I was hired by the legendary editor Graham Perkin. My first editor was Les Carlyon [who went on to write Gallipoli], who was an early influence. Carlyon was always over-worked but managed to find time for advice if requested, and that was valuable early [in the career].

Perry said he also had luck when tackling his secondary career as a film script-writer in London where he lived and worked for 12 years from mid-1973:

I wanted to broaden my writing skills and applied everywhere for a job. I landed a position as the International Wool Secretariat's film's officer [in London]. This led to me working as a producer, script-writer and on-camera interviewer with some exceptional feature and documentary writers, including Tony Maylam and Jack Grossman.

Grossman was involved with Arts for Labour, a movement which supported the UK Labour Party, then led by Neil Kinnock, in its bid to unseat Margaret Thatcher as UK Prime Minister. Grossman was commissioned to make Labour's televised party political broadcasts, which Perry scripted and helped to produce.

In 1984, while briefly back in Australia, Perry wrote and directed some of the documentary series Strike Swiftly about Australia's reservist military force. It was broadcast by ABC in 1985. Three years later he joined forces with Tim Burstall to write a TV mini-series based on Perry's biography of Wilfred Burchett, The Exile.

Perry covered three US presidential campaigns, in 1976, 1980, and 1984, primarily for newspapers and magazines in the United Kingdom including The Times and The Sunday Times. This led to a series of political articles for Penthouse Magazine UK and a documentary on the election of Ronald Reagan titled The Programming of the President. Perry's book on that subject, Hidden Power: The Programming of the President, was published in 1984 in the UK and the US. At this time, he also wrote a book for French publishers, Elections sur Ordinateur (Elections on Computer), which was well received in France and covered the marketing of political candidates in Europe.

In 1991, Perry was commissioned by the Weekend Australian Magazine to write a feature about an Australian syndicate attempting to raise the treasure from a sunken galleon off the coast of Guam. He returned with a film crew to make a documentary entitled The Raising of a Galleon’s Ghost.

== Fiction ==
Perry's first book, a novel, Program for a Puppet, was first published in the UK by W. H. Allen in May 1979 and then Crown in US in 1980. Newgate Callendar in The New York Times called it "altogether an exciting story... an exciting panorama." Publishers Weekly (US) said: "In a slick, convincing manner, Perry welds high-tech with espionage."

In an interview on Sydney radio a decade after its publication, Perry spoke about learning more from the negative reviews for his first fiction book than the good reviews:

Some were a bit cranky; some were patronising, but they were all in some way instructive. One thought the writing was 'too high mileage.' Another spoke of a 'staccato' style. I recall another mentioning that it was, at times, like a film script. One reviewer thought I had two good thrillers in one, which had merit. I did meld two big themes that may have been better separated. But you don't really know what you are doing on a first fiction. I did all the heavy research, 'forty ways to pick a lock', that sort of thing.

The author's second novel, Blood is a Stranger, was set in Australia's Arnhem Land and Indonesia. This covered the 'issue' of the misuse of uranium mining and dangers of nuclear weapons, a theme in Perry's early writing and documentary film-making. Stephen Knight in The Sydney Morning Herald wrote: Blood is a Stranger is a skilful and thoughtful thriller... with a busy plot and some interesting, unnerving speculations about what might be going on in the world of lasers, yellowcake (uranium mining and manufacture) and Asian politics—things that most people prefer to ignore in favour of more simple and familiar puzzles.'

Roland Perry returned to fiction and a pet theme — nuclear weapons — in his third novel Faces in the Rain (1990). Set mainly in Melbourne and Paris, he used the first person to expose the nefarious activities of the French in testing and developing nuclear weapons in the Pacific.

In 2015, Perry began releasing a three-book 'Assassin' fiction series. In the first two, The Honourable Assassin and The Assassin on the Bangkok Express, he tackled the operations of Mexican drug cartels and their operations in South East Asia. The third in the series, The Shaman was published in February 2021.

== Non-fiction ==
Perry's Hidden Power (1984) followed the factual theme in Program for a Puppet on the way the American public was manipulated into voting for candidates by slick computer-based campaigns. Hidden Power concentrated on the election of Ronald Reagan in 1980 and 1984. The book explained how advertising techniques had been superseded in elections by more sophisticated methods, including marketing and computer analysis. The book, as much narrative as analysis, told how the two key campaign pollsters steered their candidates. It was not critical of Reagan, but was seen by the Republican campaign as hostile to him.

In the UK, The Economist opined that the book had a "frightening message: the pollsters with their state-of-the-art computers, which keep a finger on the pulse of the electorate, hope they can manipulate almost any election and have ambitions to control what the people’s choice can do in office." Oliver Pritchett in the Sunday Telegraph thought the book's main concept was "an alarming idea, and the author... plainly intends to give us the shivers."

Perry's book The Exile, about Australian journalist, Wilfred Burchett, was published in 1988. Perry based the book on the 1974 defamation trial, when Burchett sued Jack Kane of the Democratic Labour Party for calling him a KGB agent. Stuart Macintyre dismissed the book as "a hostile life by ... a far less distinguished journalist who then turned his attention to John Monash and Don Bradman".

=== The Fifth Man ===
For his seventh book, published in 1994, Perry set out to discover the identity of the alleged fifth man in the Cambridge Five spy ring, most commonly thought to be John Cairncross. All members of the ring worked for the Soviet Union's KGB under the control of Yuri Ivanovitch Modin.

After initial research, Perry presented a 20,000-word evidentiary statement to William Armstrong of Sedgwick & Jackson UK, who had published various books on espionage, notably by British journalist Chapman Pincher. Armstrong had been caught up in circumstances surrounding the MI5 agent Peter Wright, who published Spycatcher. The Fifth Man was published during an avalanche of spy book collaborations.

The book named Victor Rothschild, 3rd Baron Rothschild, as the fifth member of the ring, the other four being Guy Burgess, Donald Maclean, Kim Philby, and Sir Anthony Blunt. Reviews were mixed. The Irish Times said, "Few writers on espionage achieve the page-turning fluency of Roland Perry." whilst The Weekend Australian said "it only takes a couple of phone calls to establish that the Rothschild operation had been pretty small beer for a long time." Norman Abjorensen in The Sunday Canberra Times wrote: "Perry makes a plausible case that the Fifth Man was... Rothschild... even from the most critical viewpoint it has to be conceded that the circumstantial evidence pointing to Rothschild is compelling." Christopher Hitchens was disparaging of both Perry's writing style and investigative ability, noting that he "would not know the difference between Bukharin and Bakunin, and makes the case that Victor Rothschild was a spy because he was a Jew."

=== Recent non-fiction ===
Perry's Monash: The Outsider Who Won a War was a critically acclaimed WWI biography set on the Western Front. He subsequently turned his attention to the Eastern Front with the publication in 2009 of The Australian Light Horse, which comprised the dual part-biographies of General Sir Harry Chauvel and T. E. Lawrence (Lawrence of Arabia). The book reached number one in the bestsellers list for the categories of 'Military' and 'History' in November 2009, and remained in that position for six months. Paul Ham wrote of The Australian Light Horse in The Australian that it "must be rated the first great read about the victories of the Australian cavalry in Arabia." The Age made the book a 'Pick of Week' and noted the author "emphasises the significance of the Light Horse achievement... it’s briskly written, well-researched popular history." Rod Moran in The West Australian called the book "an example of popular history at its best, with a compelling overview of the Australian Light Horse Regiments' exploits... what they achieved was quite remarkable." John Hamilton reviewing in the Herald Sun said: "Perry conjures up the romantic image of the Light Horse that endures to this day."

Perry's The Changi Brownlow is set in Changi prison and on the Thai-Burma railway in WW2. It features Peter Chitty, a non-combatant ambulance driver who had exceptional mental and physical fortitude. It was published in August 2010 and reached Australia's top ten best-seller list, and, similar to The Australian Light Horse was number one in the categories 'Military and History' for six months The Changi Brownlow was short-listed for the Australian Booksellers Industry Awards for non-fiction (2010).

In October 2012, Perry's Pacific 360: Australia's Fight For Survival in World War II, was published by Hachette Australia. The same month saw publication of Bill the Bastard: Australia's Greatest War Horse, billed as "dramatised non-fiction". It was chosen as one of 50 top reads in 2013 in the national "Get Reading" program. This is the story of Australia's greatest war-horse, and is featured in a documentary The Walers broadcast by ABC TV in April 2015. The feature film rights have been optioned by Australian producer/director Simon Wincer.

In amongst his six books on WW1 and WW2, Perry made a departure to write a biography on Australian yachtsman, Rolly Tasker, titled Sailing to the Moon (published by Pennon Publishing in 2008).

In 2013, Perry's Horrie the War Dog was published. It is the true story of another maverick Australian character, Jim Moody, who saved a starving puppy in the Libyan Desert in WWII. The terrier, named Horrie, in turn saved the lives of countless Australian soldiers by acting as a canine early-warning system when he barked to warn them of attacking German Stuka planes. It mirrors the earlier book Horrie the Wog Dog, authored by Ion Idriess.

October 2014 saw publication of The Queen, Her Lover and the Most Notorious Spy in History, in which Perry claimed that Queen Victoria had an illicit affair with John Elphinstone, 13th Lord Elphinstone, Captain of the Horse Guards and President of Madras, and Bombay during the Indian Uprising of 1857–58.

In 2016, Perry published Celeste: Courtesan, countess, bestselling author (Harper Collins / ABC Books). It is the story of Celeste Venard, a downtrodden French woman whose drive, intelligence, sensuality and writing skills drove her to be France's bestselling author in the 1850s with the fictional publication about an Australian gold rush, Voleur D'Or.

In 2018, ABC Books also published Anzac Sniper: The extraordinary story of Stan Savige---From Gallipoli Marksman to WWII General.

In 2020, Allen & Unwin published Perry's Red Lead: The Naval Cat with Nine Lives. Red Lead was ship's cat on HMAS Perth and survived its sinking in 1942 and life in Changi and on the Thai-Burma railway. The Australian Naval Institute reviewer said

Well I have read some 'shockers' over the years but this book has certainly set a new low standard. It is without a doubt the worst of the 'pulp history' that has been trotted out in Australia in the past decade.

== Cricket books ==
Perry's biography of Sir Donald Bradman, The Don, went to the top of the best-seller lists in Australia. E. W. Swanton in the UK Cricket Magazine: "The Don is an unsurpassable record of a phenomenal figure, from Lord’s to the moment of writing, has been, if any man ever has, a victim of his fame."

The Melbourne Herald Sun wrote: "The Don is a sterling biography... it gives a riveting account of many of Bradman’s innings, and one can almost feel the excitement that gripped cricket fans when he strode out to bat." Australian Cricket Magazine's Ken Piesse found the book was "a riveting and engrossing account of the life and times of cricket’s mega hero... In a 645-page book, Bradmanlike in research and presentation, Perry provides far more biographical and character detail on The Don and his life than previously published." The Sydney Sunday Telegraph's Peter Lalor said

Perry keeps a compelling pace in the work... The Don always let his cricket do the talking and so does the author. Perry brings to life the various innings with colourful and detailed descriptions of the shots, bowling and fielding... a good read and a handy bench-mark for all the modern hysteria [in 1995] about Brian Lara and Steve Waugh, two fine players whose averages and performances are but a shadow of The Don's.

Gideon Haigh, in contrast, wrote that "the book-shaped object of Roland Perry, had 'access', and used it to mainly unenlightening, and sometimes tedious, effect."

Perry's biography of Shane Warne, Bold Warnie, was published in 1998 and followed in 2000 by Waugh’s Way: Steve Waugh—learner, leader, legend and Captain Australia, A History of the Celebrated Captains of Australian Test Cricket.

Wisden Cricketers' Almanack 2001 said of the Waugh biography

Roland Perry is gloriously readable, always thoughtful. His account embraces all the major controversies, but there is never any question whose side he is on. Perry shows Waugh’s evolution as a cricketer and a captain with solid admiration, but shrewdness too.

Captain Australia covered every Australian skipper (except for Ricky Ponting) since Test cricket began. Each chapter carried a mini-biography of the 41 leaders. Each reviewer seemed to have a chapter that stood out for them. For The Age, Melbourne 'the most interesting' was on the 34th captain, Ian Chappell, entitled Larrikin Leader, which notes cultural and political connections between Chappell, Bob Hawke, the advertising guru John Singleton, 1970s 'ockerism,’ and the promotion of WSC (World Series Cricket, sponsored by Kerry Packer.) The Herald Sun noted: "There are some good stories in Captain Australia... The chapter on Greg Chappell gives wonderful insight into the genius of Sir Donald Bradman." Cricket magazine Inside Edge wrote: "The appeal of Captain Australia... will be the detail on captains most of us never saw such as Murdoch, Blackham, Armstrong, Woodfull and Richardson... It’s a valuable addition to our cricketing canon." Robin Marlar wrote in The Cricketer International: "Perry is a prolific, stylish writer... What lifted this book for me was the 24-page prologue on a fascinating character, Charles Lawrence, the immigrant from England who took on the embryonic Australian establishment and brought the first, if not quite the only team of Aboriginals to England in 1868."

Gideon Haigh, who himself co-authored a book on the Australian captains, wrote Perry had "...a disquieting tendency to, quite casually, mangle information for no particular reason," and "...there are assertions who origins are, at least, somewhat elusive."

Bradman divulged to Perry his world's best cricket team selection from all cricketers who had played the game since Tests began in 1877 to the end of 2000. The book, Bradman’s Best (Random House) was published simultaneously in Australia and the UK in 2001. The UK Observer's Norman Harris noted that the book "containing the 11 precious names will be guarded like gold bars." However, Warwick Franks wrote: "Perry's reverential approach turns the process into Moses bringing down the tablets from Mount Sinai. To Perry, Bradman is without spot or stain so that much of his writing, as in the earlier biography, takes on the air of hagiography. As a selector, Bradman is presented as sagacious, prescient and fearless, but his work is never subjected to any critical scrutiny." Franks also said that the book contained many factual errors.

Perry's follow up book with summary chapters on Bradman's selections of his best Ashes teams, Bradman’s Best Ashes Teams—was also published by Random House as was Miller’s Luck, a biography of Australian all-rounder, Keith Miller. The book was published in the UK by Aurum Press, with the title, Keith Miller.

Cricket historian J Neville Turner said: "Miller’s Luck is up there with the great cricket biographies. The sensitive areas are handled with integrity and discretion." Ron Reed, leading Australian sports writer, in a syndicated piece for all News Corporation tabloids including the Herald Sun wrote: ‘Miller’s Luck is an excellent biography. It’s an honest portrayal of the imperfect human being behind the heroic legend.' AAP's Jim Morton wrote: ‘Keith Miller is an enlightening biography of the test all-rounder, who was a cool and carefree match-winner on the field and a playboy philanderer off it.' The UK Cricket Society named it as the cricket biography of the year and it was short-listed for the Cricket Writers' book of the Year. Archie Mac on Cricket Web's book review wrote: "This is Roland Perry’s eighth book on cricket, and for my money his best…the result is not just a great cricketing book, but also a complete portrait of a fascinating life."

But David Frith, writing in The Cricketer, said: "Unfortunately, Roland Perry’s work here is anything but confidence-inspiring. He is an opportunistic author, Don Bradman, Shane Warne and Steve Waugh being among his previous subjects, together with a book on Australia's captains which gave the world nothing that the painstaking Ray Robinson had not already dealt with, apart from the update...the book is strewn with errors that undermine confidence in the work as a whole." And Martin Williamson, writing on Cricinfo, labelled this book as one of the two worst books of the year, saying it "polluted 2006". He said that its "lack of attention to detail made its unsavoury dredging of Miller's private life even less palatable".

ABC TV's Australian Story interviewed Perry extensively for a two-part series on Miller, which borrowed heavily from Miller’s Luck. It was broadcast over two nights in April 2009.

Perry's 20th book was The Ashes: A Celebration. The Age's Steven Carroll wrote: "Having written voluminously before on cricket and cricketers... his knowledge on the game is formidable... he’s an authoritative observer, not shy... and a very entertaining read." Kit Galer in the Melbourne Herald Sun wrote: "This book serves as an excellent primer for those whose interest in the game was aroused by Australia’s defeat last year (2005)."

Perry's 22nd book (10th on cricket) was the fourth in a series of five volumes drawn from his years of interviews with Sir Donald Bradman—Bradman’s Invincibles. The Sydney Morning Herald noted: "This is a wonderful insider’s view of the (1948 Ashes) series... Perry is a good, unpretentious writer and the story he has to tell is one of courage and drama... It is a great Australian yarn." Adrian Nesbitt in Sydney's Sun Herald wrote: "Perry paints an excellent background picture of a tour that is remembered by Australians as a triumph over the mother country, often without consideration that England was still bearing the scars of war... Perry creates suspenseful moments, in the dressing-room and on the field... His meticulous approach gives us a great understanding of the subtleties and room for instinct that were Bradman trademarks." Teri Louise Kelly in Independent Weekly said, "Perry’s work, much like Bradman himself, is head and shoulders above the competition... Bradman’s Invincibles leads the reader into the dusty backrooms, on to windy training pitches and mid-Test; beautifully written and accompanies by excellent photographs." David Stanley in Cricket Boundary Magazine commented: "Bradman’s Invincibles is required reading for all cricket lovers, particularly those of the younger brigade who may not know much about the players, apart from Bradman, who made up his remarkable team... It is a good read and I recommend it."

Tea and Scotch with Bradman was published in 2019 and is a memoir of Perry's close relationship with Bradman.

== Personal life ==
Perry's sister is the journalist and biographer Diana Georgeff.
