= Horrie the Wog Dog =

1940s military mascot

Horrie
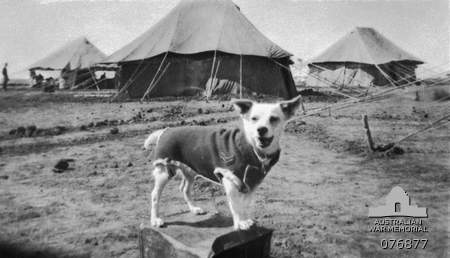
- Horrie wearing his corporal's uniform
- Species: Canis familiaris
- Breed: Terrier
- Sex: Male
- Born: 1941; Ikingi Maryut, Egypt
- Died: Unknown; Corryong, Victoria
- Nationality: Egypt
- Occupation: Unofficial mascot of the 2/1st Machine Gun Battalion.
- Employer: Australian Army
- Years active: 1941–42
- Owner: Jim Moody

Horrie the Wog Dog was the unofficial mascot for the 2/1st Machine Gun Battalion of the Second Australian Imperial Force. An Egyptian terrier, the dog was befriended by a soldier serving in the unit when it was stationed in Egypt during the Second World War. The dog subsequently followed the battalion throughout various locations in the Middle East and in Greece and Crete, before being smuggled back to Australia in 1942. In 1945, the dog became the subject of a book by author Ion Idriess, and is believed to have been destroyed by quarantine officials, although this remains the subject of speculation with some researchers claiming that the dog survived after its owner switched it with another prior to destruction.

== Story ==
Horrie, an Egyptian terrier, was befriended as a puppy by Australian soldier Private Jim Moody when he was stationed in the Ikingi Maryut area of Egypt in 1941. The dog became the unofficial mascot of Moody's unit, the 2/1st Machine Gun Battalion, and followed them as they moved around the Middle East and Greece during their various campaigns. According to the Australian War Memorial, Horrie was described by his owner as being "intelligent and easily trained", and he was employed as an air sentry, alerting troops to approaching enemy aircraft. He was promoted to the rank of corporal, and during the evacuation of Greece, Horrie was aboard the troopship Costa Rica when it was sunk. He managed to survive, though, and later made it to Crete where he was subsequently wounded by a bomb blast. In 1942, after further service in Syria as part of the Allied garrison, Horrie was brought back to Australia when Moody was repatriated. In order to get around stringent quarantine laws which would have prevented him from bringing Horrie back, Moody smuggled the dog home in a canvas bag, which was reinforced with wooden slats so that the dog could breathe.

In 1945, after Horrie came to public attention following the publishing of a book by Ion Idriess about Horrie's exploits, Moody was ordered by quarantine officials to surrender Horrie to be put down. It remains uncertain as to whether this occurred. It is believed that the dog was destroyed on 12 March 1945, although according to author Anthony Hill, in his book Animal Heroes it was claimed that Horrie survived after Moody substituted him with another dog from the pound, who was destroyed in Horrie's place, and that Horrie lived out his natural life near Corryong, in rural Victoria.

== Books ==
Horrie is the subject of the book Horrie the Wog-Dog: With the A.I.F. in Egypt, Greece, Crete and Palestine by Ion Idriess published in 1948; the book uses material provided by Jim Moody. He is also the subject of the book Horrie the War Dog by Roland Perry published in 2013.

Horrie is also mentioned in the books The Long Carry: A History of the 2/1 Australian Machine Gun Battalion 1939–46 by Philip Hocking published in 1997 and in Animal Heroes by Anthony Hill.

== Statue ==
During the 2016 ANZAC Day service at the Corryong Memorial Hall & Gardens a statue of Horrie the Wog Dog was unveiled to the public. The statue depicts Horrie in a pose on a kerosene tin in Egypt.

== See also ==
- List of individual dogs
