= Corryong Airport =

- IATA: CYG; ICAO: YCRG

Summary
- Airport type: Public
- Operator: Shire of Towong
- Location: Corryong, Victoria
- Elevation AMSL: 963 ft / 294 m
- Coordinates: 36°10′58″S 147°53′16″E

Map
- Location in Victoria

Runways
Direction	Length		Surface
Direction	m	ft	Surface
06/24	1,401	4,596	Asphalt
- Sources: Australian AIP and aerodrome chart

Corryong Airport (IATA: CYG, ICAO: YCRG) is a small Australian regional airport, which serves the town of Corryong in Victoria's north.

== See also ==
- List of airports in Victoria, Australia
