= 2/1st Machine Gun Battalion =

Former battalion of the Australian Army

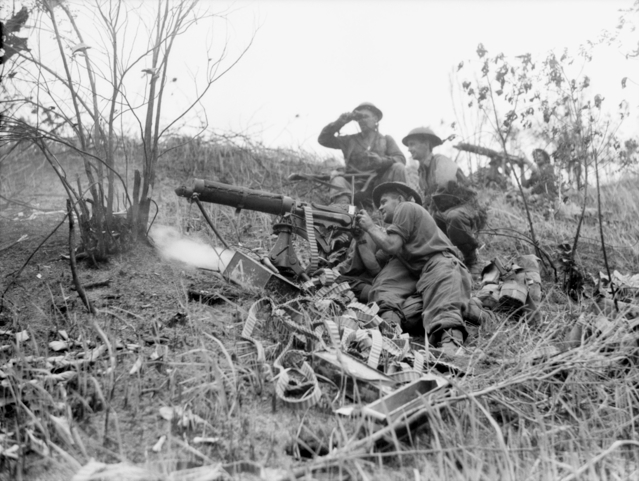
- Machine gunners from the 2/1st at Balikpapan, July 1945
- Active: 1939–1946
- Country: Australia
- Branch: Australian Army
- Type: Infantry
- Role: Direct fire support
- Size: ~ 800–900 personnel
- Part of: 6th Division; 7th Division
- Mascot: Horrie the Wog Dog
- Engagements: World War II: Battle of Greece; Battle of Crete; New Guinea Campaign; Borneo Campaign (1945)

Insignia
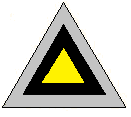
- Unit colour patch

The 2/1st Machine Gun Battalion was a battalion of the Australian Army that was raised for service during World War II as part of the 6th Division. When it was formed on 14 December 1939, its component companies were spread across several Australian states, but it was later concentrated at Ingleburn, New South Wales, where it completed basic training in the early months of the war. In mid-1940, the battalion embarked for overseas, bound initially for the Middle East, but following the Fall of France it was diverted to the United Kingdom. Along with a larger contingent of Australians, it helped to bolster the island nation's garrison, undertaking defensive duties during a period when it was expected that the Germans might launch a cross-Channel invasion.

The battalion was transferred to the Middle East in late 1940, after the threat of invasion had passed. It underwent further training in Egypt, before taking part in fighting against the Germans in Greece and on Crete in mid-1941. Having lost most of its equipment and suffering heavy casualties, the 2/1st was rebuilt in Palestine, then undertook garrison duties in Syria in 1941–1942. The battalion was withdrawn to Australia in response to Japan's entry into the war in December 1941. During 1943, the 2/1st fought a defensive role in the New Guinea campaign. Following its withdrawal to Australia in early 1944, the battalion was reorganised on the Atherton Tablelands, and reassigned to the 7th Division. It was committed to its final campaign in mid-1945, during the Borneo campaign. The battalion was disbanded after the war in early 1946. One of its mascots, Horrie the Wog Dog, became the subject of a book by Ion Idriess.

== History ==
=== Formation ===
The 2/1st Machine Gun Battalion (Note: The numerical designation of 2nd AIF units was prefixed by "2/", which was used to set them apart from Militia units or units of the First Australian Imperial Force, which did not use a prefix.) was formed on 14 December 1939, as part of the Second Australian Imperial Force (2nd AIF). It was raised following a reorganisation of the 6th Division's infantry battalions, which saw the transfer of the machine gun platoons that had previously existed within each battalion to a single unit. Three other machine gun battalions were subsequently raised as part of the 2nd AIF during the war to support its four infantry divisions. Developed by the British Army, the concept within the Australian Army had its genesis during the Gallipoli Campaign in 1915, when the machine guns assigned to the infantry battalions – initially two, later four – had been grouped together and co-ordinated at brigade level to help compensate for the lack of artillery support. Over the course of the war on the Western Front, the concept had evolved through the establishment of machine gun companies in 1916 to the establishment of machine gun battalions in 1918. Similar formations had also been established amongst the Australian Light Horse units serving in the Sinai and Palestine Campaign. During the inter-war years, the machine gun battalions had been deemed unnecessary. When the Army was reorganised in 1921, they were not re-raised, but in 1937, when the Army looked to expand as fears of war in Europe loomed, four such units were raised within the part-time Militia by converting and motorising light horse units. When the Second World War broke out, the decision was made to raise several machine gun battalions within the 2nd AIF, one allocated to each division.

Under the command of Lieutenant Colonel Claude Prior, the 2/1st Machine Gun Battalion was formed with four machine gun companies, a headquarters company – consisting of an anti-aircraft platoon, a signals platoon and a transport platoon – and a battalion headquarters. Australian machine gun battalions were established with an authorised strength of around 800 to 900 personnel, and like the others, the 2/1st was a motorised infantry unit with wheeled motor vehicles and tracked carriers. Equipped with 48 Vickers medium machine guns, the battalion's four machine gun companies – designated 'A' to 'D' and each consisting of three four-gun platoons – were initially formed separately, with 'A' Company forming at Ingleburn, in New South Wales, 'B' Company forming at Puckapunyal, in Victoria, 'C' in South Australia, and 'D' at Rutherford, in New South Wales. At the end of the month, 'B' and 'C' Companies concentrated at Rutherford, before moving to Ingleburn with 'D' Company in January 1940. An intense period of training followed, with range shoots at Liverpool, and field exercises in the Green Hills and Wallacia areas, the latter being conducted in conjunction with the infantry battalions of the 18th Brigade. This period concluded in early May 1940, when the battalion was moved by train to Darling Harbour and embarked upon the Queen Mary.

=== Defence of Britain ===
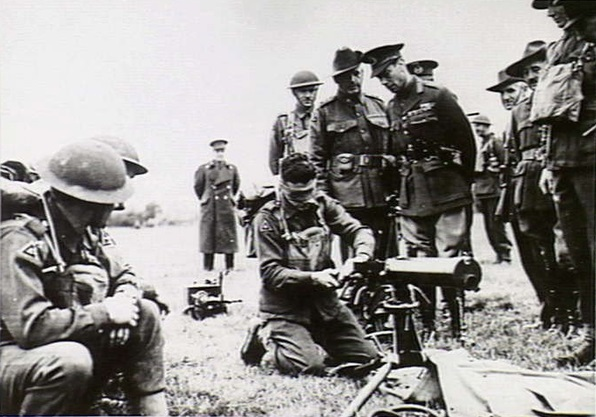
King George VI inspecting the skills of one of the 2/1st's machine gunners, 1940

The men aboard Queen Mary were originally destined for the Middle East, but a decision was made mid-voyage to divert them to the United Kingdom, as part of a larger contingent of Australians that were sent to help bolster the defences there. After making the long passage via Fremantle, Cape Town, and Freetown, the Queen Mary arrived off the coast of Gourock, Scotland, on 16 June. The evacuation at Dunkirk had been carried out just two weeks earlier, and France had just fallen; Britain was now preparing for a potential cross-Channel invasion. The Australian troops from the 18th Brigade and, eventually, the 25th Brigade, along with various supporting arms, had been despatched to help bolster the island nation's defences. From Gourock, they entrained and moved south to Tidworth Camp on Salisbury Plain. They remained in Britain for much of the rest of the year, undertaking training, mounting guard, conducting patrols and exercises. They moved to Colchester in October to afford the Australians a more permanent barracks for the coming winter, as they were mainly under canvas at Tidworth. The following month, as the threat of invasion seemingly passed, they received orders to move to Glasgow to embark on the transport Otranto, bound for the Middle East where they were to rejoin the rest of the 6th Division.

=== Middle East, Greece, and Crete ===
Sailing around the west coast of Africa to avoid the threat of air attack in the Mediterranean, the Otrango carried the battalion to Egypt, which was reached at the end of December, following stops at Freetown and Durban. After docking at Kantara, the battalion moved by rail over 225 miles (362 km) to Ikingi Maryut, west of Alexandria in the Western Desert. There they received a new commanding officer, Lieutenant Colonel Thomas Gooch, after Prior was promoted and transferred to divisional headquarters, and they began training to acclimatise to the new conditions. The rest of the 6th Division had gone into action in the Western Desert but the 2/1st, still waiting on the majority of its equipment to arrive, was not committed, its place being taken by a British machine gun battalion from the Royal Northumberland Fusiliers. The Australian battalion remained at Ikingi Maryut until late March and early April, when it was despatched, along with the rest of the 6th Division, to Greece, where a German invasion was expected.

Spread across several different transport vessels, after completing the crossing – during which the battalion's machine guns were employed for anti-aircraft defence – the 2/1st's companies were split up: 'A' Company, supported the Australian 2/4th Battalion, while two companies – 'B' and 'C' – supported the New Zealand 4th Brigade, and another – 'D' Company – was assigned to the Australian 17th Brigade. The campaign proved to be short-lived, as the Allies were quickly pushed back by the advancing Germans, and the battalion was subsequently withdrawn around the end of April and early May, having fought major actions around the Aliakmon River, Servia Pass, Lamia and Mount Olympus. During the evacuation, elements of three companies were taken aboard the transport Costa Rica, which was later attacked by German aircraft. As the vessel was sinking, the troops on board were evacuated by Royal Navy destroyers and landed on Crete; the majority of their equipment had been lost. On Crete, the battalion's companies were once again separated; 'D' Company, the only company in possession of all of its equipment, was assigned to support the Australian 19th Brigade around Georgioupolis, while the other three companies went into camp around Suda. A single platoon from 'B' Company was later sent to reinforce 'D' Company; however, on 14 May, the remainder of the battalion – 432 personnel – was evacuated from the island on the transport Lossiebank, sailing back to Egypt and subsequently missing the German invasion of Crete, which was launched a week later. A short but sharp campaign followed, which saw the machine gunners that remained – 170 personnel, including six officers – take part in fighting around Canea and Retimo before the island's garrison was finally defeated at the end of May. By the end of the fighting, the 2/1st had lost 104 men killed, wounded or captured in Greece and Crete; two of those captured later escaped, while one died in captivity.

After arriving in Egypt, the remainder of the battalion was transported to Palestine, where it was rebuilt. The 2/1st Machine Gun Battalion remained stationed around Gaza until October, when it was sent to Syria to bolster the garrison that had been established there following the defeat of Vichy French forces. At this time, the 2/1st effectively became assigned to the 7th Division, and received a new commanding officer, as Lieutenant Colonel Cyril Fidock, a World War I veteran, replaced Gooch. The battalion was subsequently stationed in Damascus and at Zaboud, remaining there until early 1942, when it was moved back to Gaza as part of the draw-down of Australian forces in the Middle East and their return to Australia in response to Japan's entry into the war. The battalion embarked upon an American troop transport, USS West Point, in mid-March 1942, completing the voyage to Port Adelaide, via Fremantle, in just 19 days.

=== New Guinea and Borneo ===
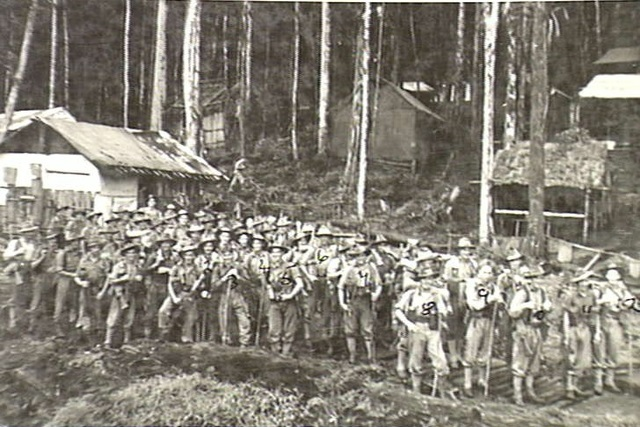
Members of 'A' Company, 2/1st Machine Gun Battalion, rest at Skindewai during the march from Bulolo to Nassau Bay, 1943

Following the battalion's arrival in Adelaide, the men were billeted by local people in the city's suburbs, while leave drafts were despatched throughout April. In early May, the 2/1st was reconstituted at Ingleburn, where it remained until June 1942, when the order came to move to Queensland. Moving up the coast via train, the battalion established a camp near Peachester, in the Sunshine Coast hinterland. Jungle training was undertaken there until September, when the 2/1st moved to another camp closer to the coast at Deception Bay. At the end of October, 'A' and 'B' Companies embarked in Brisbane, bound for New Guinea, to reinforce the troops fighting around Buna; en route they were diverted to Townsville, where they were unloaded. 'B' Company later re-embarked and arrived in Port Moresby in late November on the transport Both, before moving to Oro Bay, where it was deployed defensively around the US base and the mission at Eroro. 'A' Company also deployed in December, and the following month also moved to Oro Bay. The rest of the battalion remained at Deception Bay in Queensland and did not link up with the other companies until May 1943, landing in Port Moresby from the Duntroon. In the intervening period, the two deployed companies were temporarily detached to the Militia 7th Machine Gun Battalion, and 'A' Company went into action in the Pacific for the first time, fighting around Wau, before marching to Nassau Bay to support the 3rd Division during the Salamaua–Lae campaign.

The battalion was withdrawn back to Australia in early 1944 for rest and reorganisation. During this period it was stationed at Tenterfield, where the soldiers experienced a bitterly cold winter, before moving to Petrie and then Kiari on the Atherton Tablelands. The battalion was reorganised to conform with the requirements of the jungle divisional establishment, and as a result its vehicles were changed to include jeeps and trailers, instead of trucks, which were considered impractical in the jungle. A change of commanding officer also took place in this time, with Lieutenant Colonel Alexander Haupt – who had previously served as battalion second-in-command before leaving to take over command of the 62nd Battalion in January 1943 – returning to take over from Fidock. A long period of training, which included courses in amphibious warfare and various jungle exercises followed, as the focus of the fighting in the Pacific shifted away from Australian forces towards the US military. Consequently, it was not until close to the end of the war that the battalion went into action again. Before this, the battalion contributed to an Australian contingent that was sent to India to lecture British Army officers on the lessons of jungle warfare.

In May 1945, the battalion was transported to Morotai Island in preparation for Operation Oboe, the recapture of Borneo and the Netherlands East Indies. The 2/1st was assigned to support the 7th Division's landing on Balikpapan in July. Now largely being used as a divisional asset, the battalion provided a company to each of the division's component brigades – the 18th, 21st and 25th – while one company remained in reserve with the headquarters. Coming ashore aboard several landing craft, the two companies taking part in the initial assault – 'B' and 'D' – helped to secure the high ground overlooking the beachhead, while 'C' Company remained a floating reserve along with the 25th Brigade. The battalion's reserve company, 'A' Company, and headquarters element came ashore in a later wave to set up a secure base. During the subsequent advance inland, the battalion's main focus was progressing through what the Australians dubbed the "Vasey Highway", which ran east–west along the island's southern shore, as the Australians fought to take the oil pipeline and the airfield at Manggar, and the "Milford Highway", which ran north–south through the centre into the more mountainous hinterland. During the fighting on Borneo, the 2/1st lost 17 men killed or wounded.

Following the conclusion of hostilities, the battalion's personnel were returned to Australia in small drafts, as the 2/1st undertook garrison duties in the Balikpapan area. The longer-serving men were repatriated and discharged early, while volunteers were transferred to other units that were being raised as part of the British Commonwealth Occupation Force that would be deployed to Japan. In November, a batch of men were transferred to the 21st Brigade for occupation duties in the Celebes as the Australian forces began preparing to hand over the territories to Dutch authorities. By December, the battalion consisted of less than fifty personnel, and at the end of the month this cadre embarked upon the transport Kings Point Victory to make the journey back to Australia. The battalion was subsequently disbanded on 26 January 1946.

When they had been formed, it was intended that the machine gun battalions would provide highly mobile fire support; however, Phillip Hocking, author of The Long Carry, highlights that throughout the war the utility of the machine gun battalions was largely misunderstood by commanders, particularly after the focus of the Australian Army's operations shifted to the Pacific. Some commanders used the machine guns largely in a static defensive capacity against short and medium range targets, rather than as offensive fire support weapons that could be employed to provide long range fire support. The medium machine guns were also largely utilised in the same manner as light machine guns such as the Bren. Other reasons identified for the concept's limited use include distrust of overhead fire by some commanders, a preference for organic fire support over attached sub-units, over-estimating the difficulty of transporting Vickers guns in the jungle, and a tendency to ignore targets that could not be seen. After the disbandment, the machine gun battalion concept was not used in the post-war Australian Army, as the function became nested within the structure of a standard infantry battalion.

One of the 2/1st Machine Gun Battalion's mascots, Horrie the Wog Dog, was the subject of a book by Ion Idriess; the book was based on stories recounted by the dog's owner, Jim Moody, who served as a machine gunner in the 2/1st. Over 2,000 personnel served in the 2/1st throughout the war, and 34 members of the battalion were killed in action, died of wounds or died from accident. Decorations awarded included two Military Crosses, four Military Medals, one British Empire Medal and 16 Mentions in Despatches.

== Commanders ==
The following officers served as commanding officer of the 2/1st Machine Gun Battalion:

- Lieutenant Colonel Claude Esdaile Prior (1939–1940);
- Lieutenant Colonel Thomas Neil Gooch (1941);
- Lieutenant Colonel Cyril Henwood Fidock (1941–1944);
- Lieutenant Colonel Alexander Graham Keith Haupt (1944–1945).

== Battle honours ==
The 2/1st received the following battle honours for their involvement in the war:

- Greece 1941, Mount Olympus, Servia Pass, Middle East 1941, Crete, South West Pacific 1945, Borneo, Balikpapan, and Milford Highway.

== Notes ==
Footnotes

Citations
