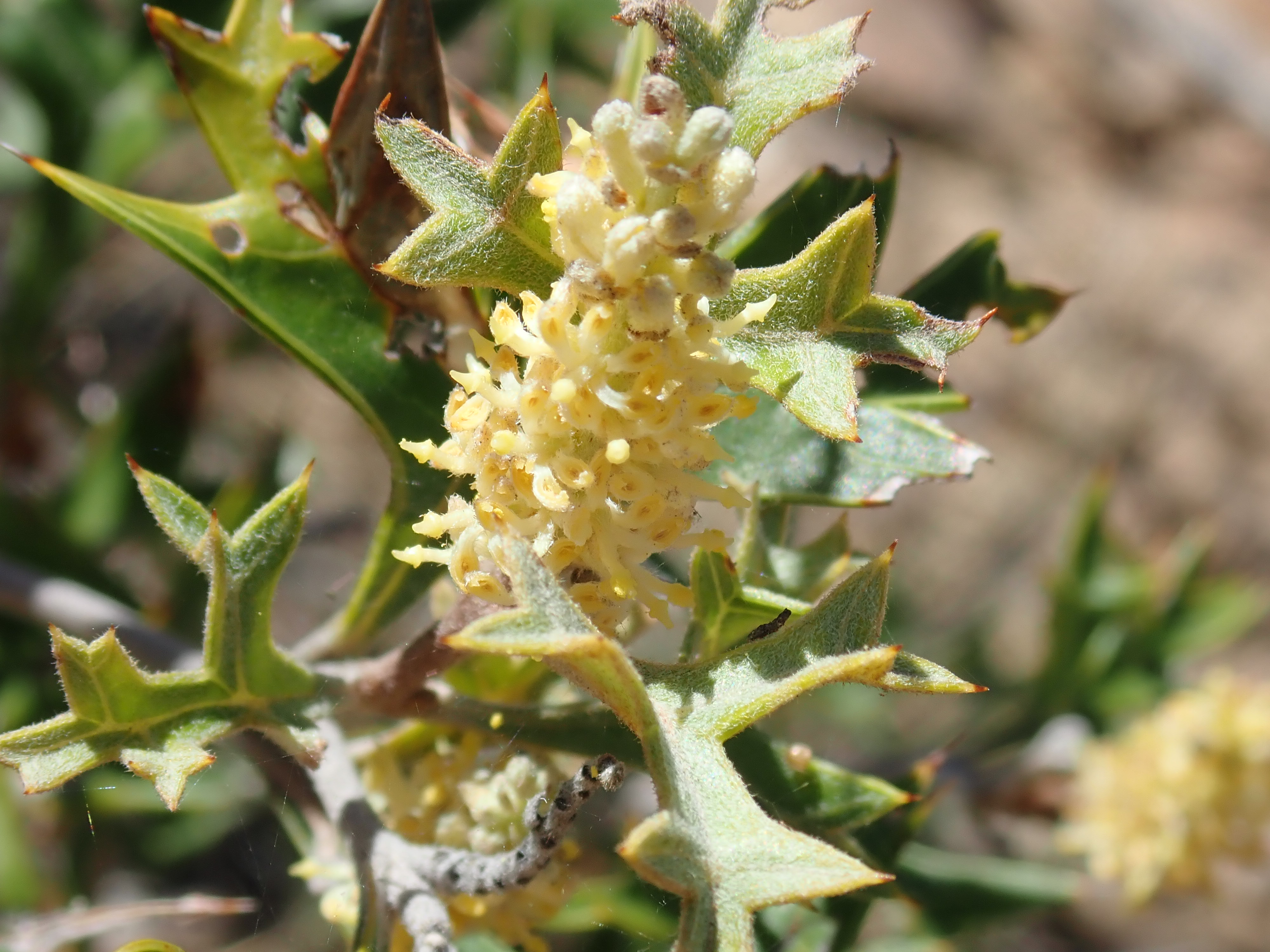

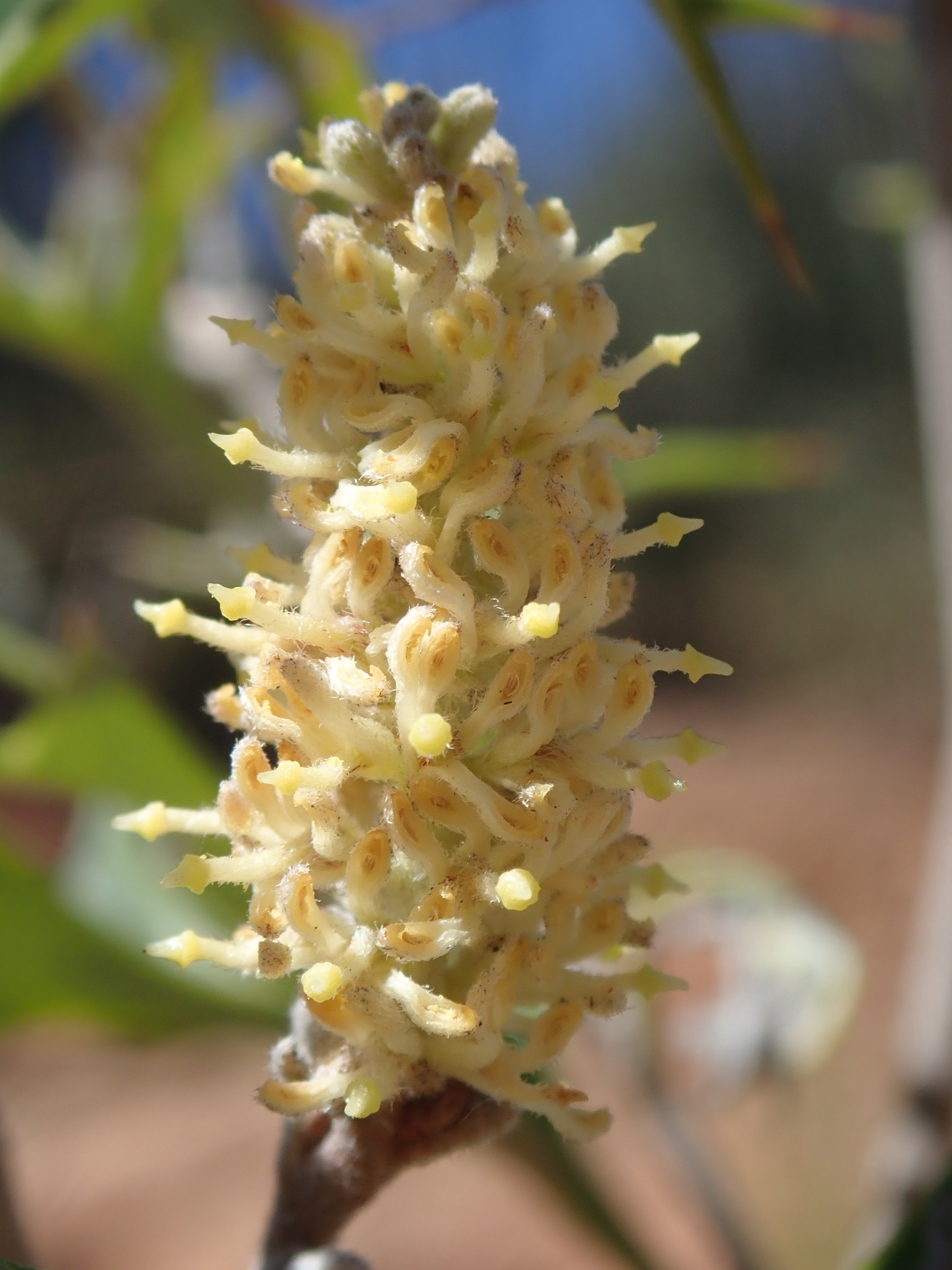

Scientific classification
- Kingdom: Plantae
- Clade: Tracheophytes
- Clade: Angiosperms
- Clade: Eudicots
- Order: Proteales
- Family: Proteaceae
- Genus: Grevillea
- Species: G. ramosissima

Binomial name
- Grevillea ramosissima Meisn.
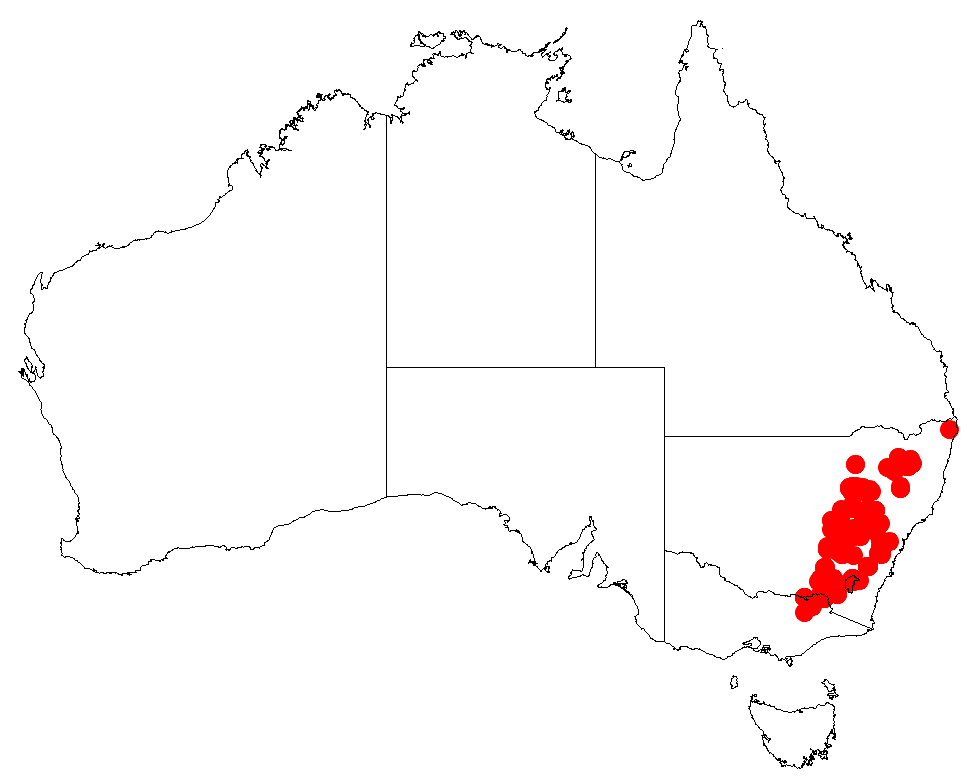
- Occurrence data from AVH

Synonyms
- Anadenia caleyi R.Br.

= Grevillea ramosissima =

Species of shrub endemic to Australia

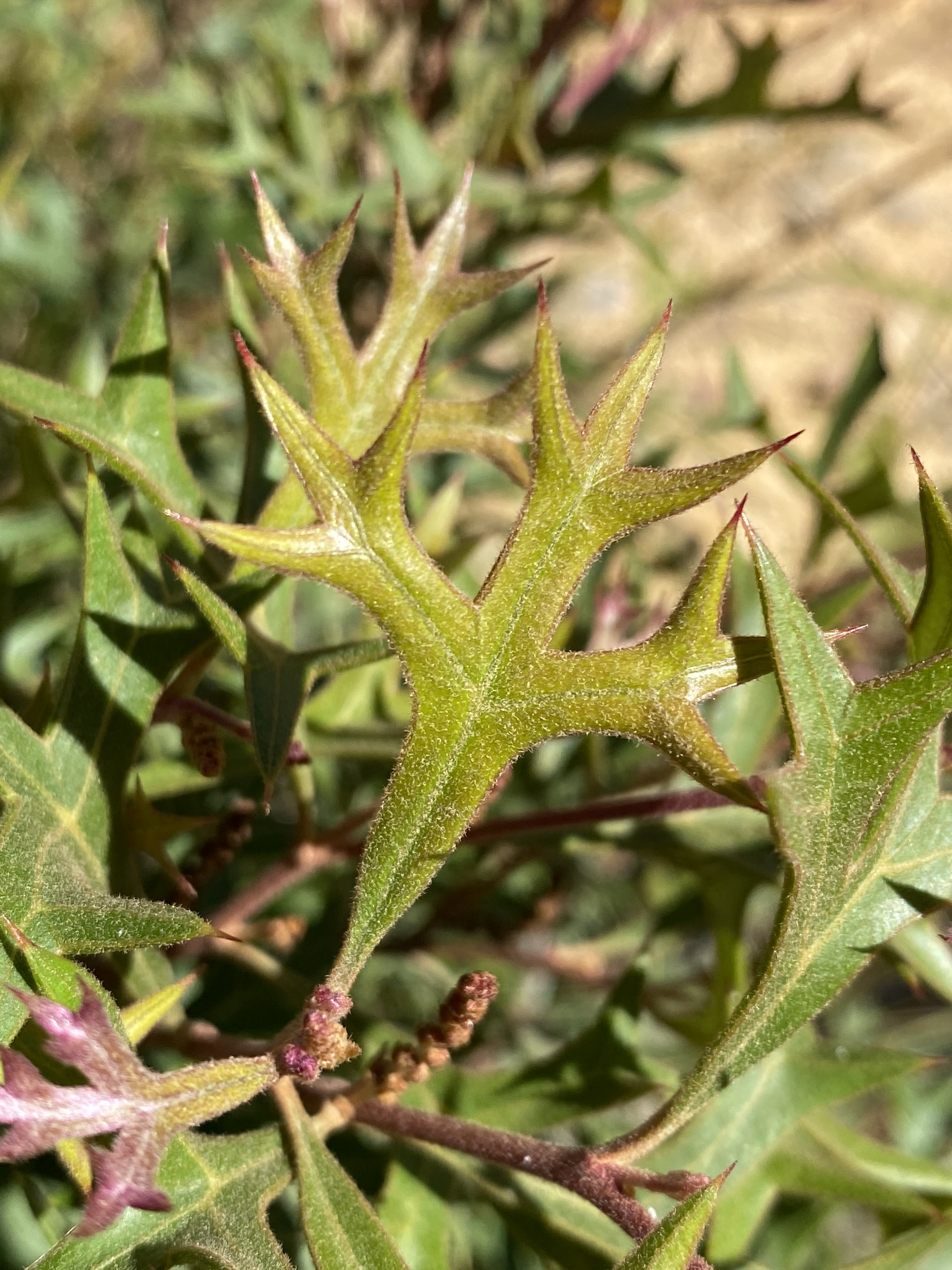
Foliage

Grevillea ramosissima, commonly known as fan grevillea, is a species of flowering plant in the family Proteaceae and is endemic to eastern continental Australia. It is a low, spreading shrub with lobed leaves and clusters of cream-coloured to pale yellow flowers.

== Description ==
Grevillea ramosissima is a low, spreading shrub that typically grows to a height of 0.3–1.5 m (1 ft 0 in – 4 ft 11 in) and often forms root suckers. The leaves are 30–80 mm (1.2–3.1 in) long and divided, usually with 3 to 11 lobes that are sometimes divided again, the end lobes more or less triangular to egg-shaped, mostly 3–20 mm (0.12–0.79 in) long and 2–7 mm (0.079–0.276 in) wide and sharply pointed. The edges of the leaves are turned down, and the lower surface is woolly-hairy. The flowers are arranged in conical to cylindrical clusters on a rachis 25–85 mm (0.98–3.35 in) long, the flowers at the base of the cluster opening first. The flowers are cream-coloured to pale yellow, the pistil 3.5–5.3 mm (0.14–0.21 in) long. Flowering mainly occurs in October and November and the fruit is a woolly-hairy follicle 7.5–10 mm (0.30–0.39 in) long.

== Taxonomy ==
In 1830, Robert Brown described Anadenia caleyi in the supplement to his Prodromus Florae Novae Hollandiae et Insulae Van Diemen from specimens collected by George Caley in 1804. In 1855, Carl Meissner moved Anadenia caleyi to the genus Grevillea but the name Grevillea caleyi had already been used for a different species. Meissner changed the name to Grevillea ramosissima in Hooker's Journal of Botany and Kew Garden Miscellany. The specific epithet (ramosissima) means "much-branched".

In 1994, Peter M. Olde and Neil R. Marriott described G. ramosissima subsp. hypargyrea, and the name, and that of the autonym are accepted by the Australian Plant Census:

- Grevillea ramosissima subsp. hypargyrea (F.Muell.) Olde & Marriott.
- Grevillea ramosissima Meisn. subsp. ramosissima

Subspecies hypargyrea had previously been known as Grevillea ramosissima var. hypargyrea, first formally described in 1874 by Ferdinand von Mueller in his Fragmenta Phytographiae Australiae. It is distinguished from subsp. ramosissima by the straight hairs on the lower surface of the leaves.

Subspecies ramosissima is distinguished from subsp. hypargyrea by the twisted hairs on the lower surface of the leaves.

== Distribution and habitat ==
Subspecies hypargyrea is endemic to Victoria, where it is found in a few isolated places near the upper Murray River in the far north of the state, growing in woodland on granite.

Subspecies ramosissima is endemic to New South Wales where it occurs on the coast, tablelands and slopes south from near Glen Innes and Tenterfield.

== Conservation status ==
Subspecies hypargyrea is listed as "endangered" under the Victorian Government Flora and Fauna Guarantee Act 1988.
