= Burrowa-Pine Mountain National Park =

National park in Victoria, Australia

- IUCN category II (national park)
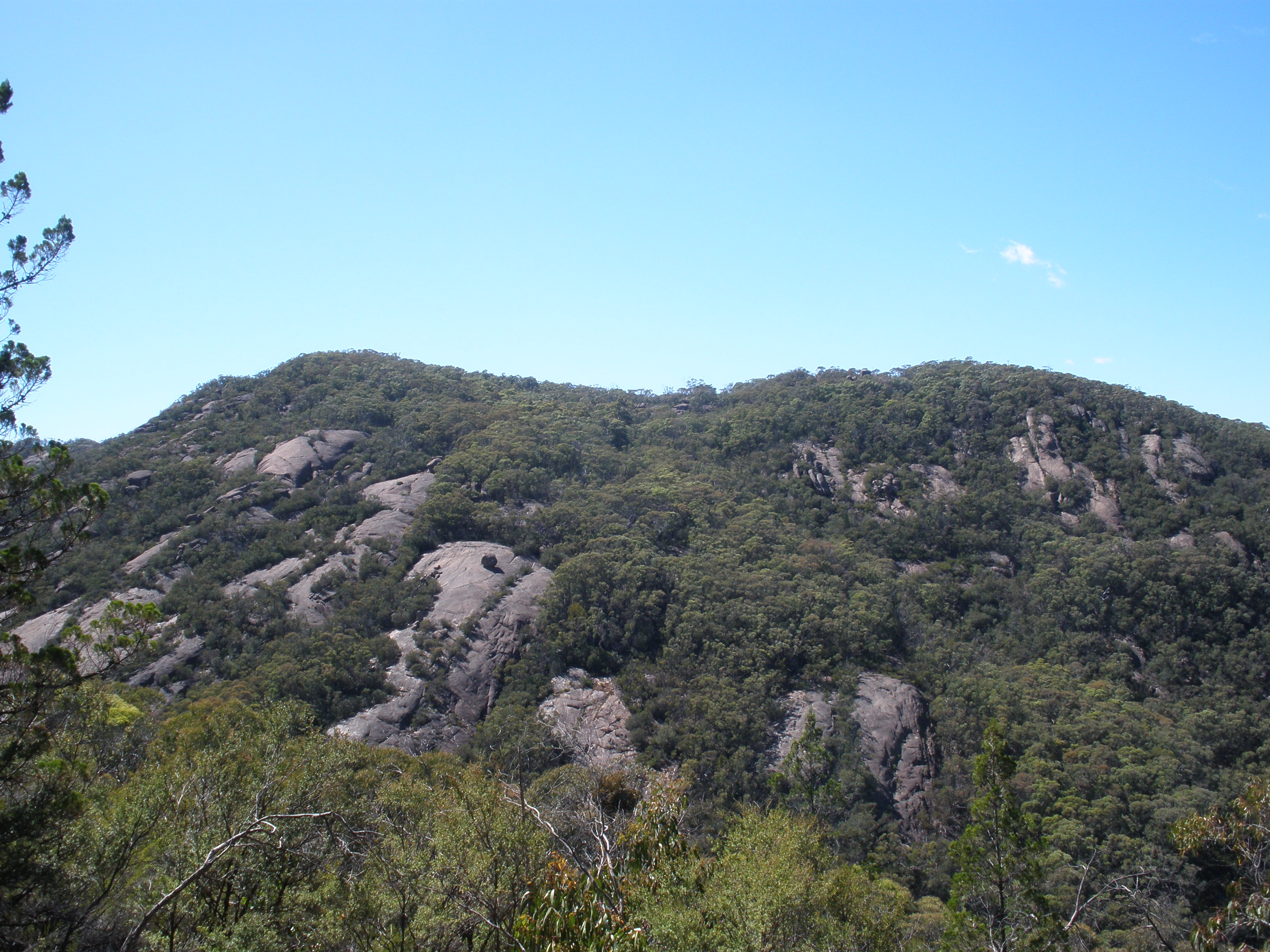
- Pine Mountain, located within the park

- Location within Victoria
- Location: Victoria
- Nearest city: Walwa
- Coordinates: 36°05′24″S 147°45′29″E
- Area: 184 km^{2} (71 sq mi)
- Established: 16 May 1978
- Governing body: Parks Victoria
- Website: http://parkweb.vic.gov.au/explore/parks/burrowa-pine-mountain-national-park

The Burrowa-Pine Mountain National Park is a national park in the Hume region of Victoria, Australia. The 18,400-hectare (45,000-acre) national park is situated approximately 315 kilometres (196 mi) northeast of Melbourne and 120 kilometres (75 mi) east of Wodonga.

The Pine Mountain, one of the largest monoliths in Australia, is located within the park and is believed to be 1.5 times the size of Uluru. The highest peak in the park is Mount Burrowa at an elevation of 1,300 metres (4,300 ft) above sea level.

== See also ==
- Protected areas of Victoria
