= Box Hill Hawks =

Australian rules football club

Names
- Full name: Box Hill Hawks Football Club
- Former name: Box Hill Football Club
- Nickname(s): Hawks, Mustangs, Stangs
- Former nickname(s): White Horses, Stranglers

2025 season
- After finals: VFL: 3rd VFLW: 3rd
- Home-and-away season: VFL: 2nd of 21; VFLW: 3rd of 12

Club details
- Founded: 1936; 90 years ago
- Colours: Brown Gold
- Competition: VFL: Men's; VFLW: Women's
- Coach: VFL: David Mirra; VFLW: Michael Ericson
- Captain(s): VFL: Stu Horner; VFLW: Tamara Luke
- Premierships: VFA/VFL (Div 1) (4): 2001; 2013; 2018; 2026
- Ground: Box Hill City Oval (10,000)

Uniforms
Home

Other information
- Official website: boxhillhawks.com.au

The Box Hill Hawks Football Club is an Australian rules football club based in the Melbourne suburb of Box Hill, competing in the Victorian Football League (VFL) and the VFL Women's (VFLW).

Since 2000, Box Hill has had a reserves affiliation with Australian Football League (AFL) club Hawthorn.

== History ==
=== Early Australian rules football in Box Hill (1903–1935) ===
Organised Australian rules football within the municipality of Box Hill can be traced back to 1903 and the founding of the Reporter District Football Association (RDFA). The six inaugural clubs were Bayswater, Box Hill, Canterbury, Ferntree Gully, Mitcham and Ringwood. This Box Hill team played on a ground approximately 400 metres south of where Box Hill City Oval is located today, the site is now partly occupied by the Box Hill High School and the Box Hill Cemetery. This team is wholly unrelated to the Box Hill Hawks Football Club of today but was the first team to be known as Box Hill and was the first Australian rules football team in the municipality.

In 1921, a team known as the Box Hill Junior Football Club participated in local competitions and in 1923 the Eastern Suburban Protestant Churches Football Association was formed with two teams representing Box Hill; Box Hill United and Box Hill City. The Box Hill City Football Club was the fore-runner of the present day club and was the first to wear the brown and gold uniform associated with later Box Hill teams. In 1932 the Eastern Suburban Football League formed with Box Hill City as a foundation member. In 1935 Box Hill City merged with Box Hill East. Prior to the 1936 season Box Hill East, Box Hill District and Box Hill Methodists all merged to become the Box Hill Football Club and this event is now generally regarded as the formation of the present-day club.

=== ESFL (1936–1950) ===
The newly formed Box Hill Football Club played at Surrey Park in 1936 and competed in the Eastern Suburbs Football League (ESFL) "B" Grade; qualifying for the Grand Final but being defeated by Hartwell. Both Grand Finalists were promoted to "A" Grade for season 1937 and in its first season in the higher grade Box Hill again reached the Grand Final, this time being defeated by Auburn.

In 1937 the team moved to the newly constructed Box Hill City Oval after the land south of Whitehorse Road was acquired by the Box Hill Cemetery Trust. The new oval was designed and constructed by the City Engineer, Mr FW Kerr, and provided improved facilities including a grand stand with changing rooms and covered races, a recorder board, conveniences, committee rooms, a timekeeper's box and a kiosk. Chain mesh partitions were provided for the "inner" and "outer" spectator viewing areas. At the time the ground was regarded as the equal of any in Victoria.

In 1939 the "A" Grade premiership was won but the team withdrew from the ESFL after 11 rounds of the 1940 season as the logistics of fielding a team became impossible due to players enlisting for the War effort. The ESFL itself went into recess from 1942 to 1944 before resuming in 1945. Box Hill won the 1945 and 1946 "East Section" premierships (with fuel restrictions in force in the years immediately after World War II, the ESFL divided into "East" and "West" sections to minimise travel). A third consecutive premiership was narrowly missed with the 1947 grand final being lost by 1 point to Mitcham. Box Hill was again defeated in the 1948 and 1949 grand finals, on each occasion by Ringwood. In 1950, in what was to prove Box Hill's final season in the ESFL, it lost the first semi-final to Tooronga by 1 point. During its 11 seasons in the ESFL, Box Hill only failed to qualify for the grand final on 3 occasions – 1938, 1940 (when the club withdrew mid-season) and 1950.

Towards the end of the 1940s the Victorian Football Association adopted an expansionist policy aimed at bringing senior football to the newer and younger suburbs of Melbourne, a policy that would see the VFA increase in numbers from twelve to twenty Clubs by the mid-1960s. The first two Clubs admitted under this new strategy were Box Hill and Moorabbin who, at the end of the 1950 season, were invited to field teams in the VFA for the 1951 season.

=== VFA (1951–1995) ===
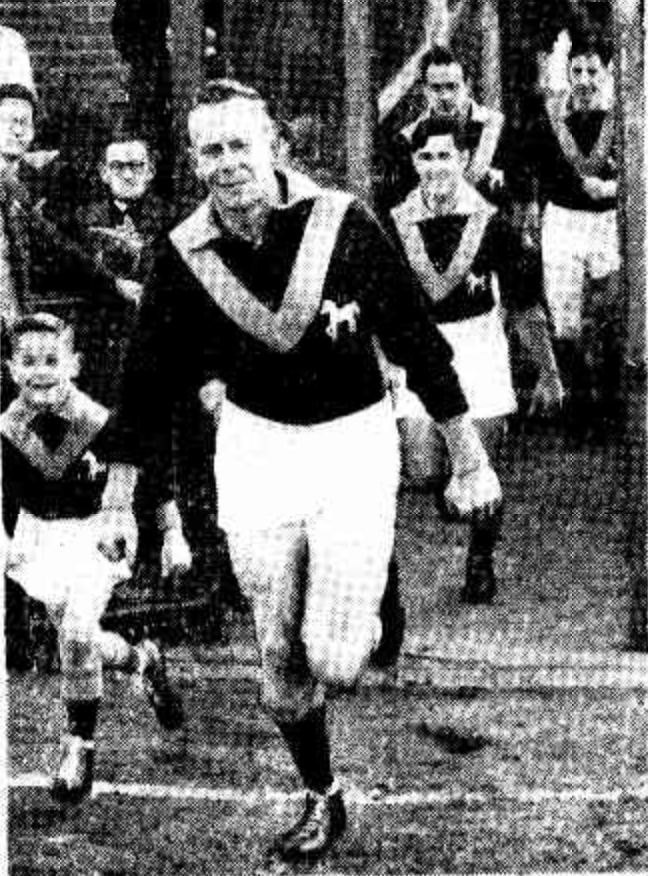
Box Hill captain A. Mihan leading the team out for its first senior VFA match on 21 April 1951

The Box Hill Football Club made its debut in the VFA on Saturday 21 April 1951 at Preston City Oval. The team lost to Preston 7.9 (51) to 16.14 (110). Success did not come readily at first as the team largely based on its ESFL players and local juniors struggled to make the transition to senior football. The only premiership points gained during this first season were recorded in a drawn match against Williamstown at home in Round 13.

Improvement was steady during the early VFA years and the appointment of former Richmond champion and 1948 Brownlow Medallist Bill Morris as playing coach for the 1952 season proved to be an excellent choice. Morris attracted quality footballers to Box Hill and inspired the team through his own efforts. Morris played with Box Hill for three years and won the best and fairest by a huge margin each season and must still be regarded as one of the very best players ever to represent the club.

In 1956 Box Hill made its initial appearance in the VFA finals under captain-coach Col Austen. It defeated Brunswick in the first semi-final before losing to eventual premiers Williamstown in the preliminary final. Austen again guided the club into the finals in 1958, losing the first semi-final to Port Melbourne.

After the high points of 1956 and 1958, during the ensuing seasons Box Hill's performances began to decline. In 1960 the VFA was a single division of seventeen teams and Box Hill finished tenth. When divisional football was introduced for the 1961 season Box Hill therefore became the final club admitted to the newly formed ten team first division.

Box Hill finished last in the first division in 1961 and therefore became the first team to be relegated to the VFA second division. Divisional football was conducted in the VFA for 28 years from 1961 to 1988 and Box Hill played a total of 24 seasons in the second division (1962 to 1984, 1986). Only Northcote (25 seasons), Sunshine (25 seasons) and Mordialloc (withdrew 3 rounds into its 25th season) were in the lower division for a longer period of time.

In 1960 the VFA introduced Sunday football which, as the only professional sport played in Melbourne on a Sunday, soon developed a large following and became a financial boon for VFA clubs that hosted Sunday matches. Box Hill, a conservative club in a conservative municipality, at first vigorously opposed the introduction of Sunday football and refused to play Sunday games. Even when the club changed its stance and agreed to play on Sundays in 1966, the Box Hill City Council continued to refuse permission for the club to host Sunday matches at Box Hill City Oval. Box Hill did not gain council's permission to play Sunday matches on its own ground until 1969, the final VFA club to do so. Generally the club struggled throughout the 1960s as it suffered financially by not being able to play Sunday Football at home. Through the 1960s, the club relied on a successful Saturday night dance that it hosted at the Box Hill Town Hall for most of its income. Box Hill finished fourth in the second division in 1962 but did not reach the finals again until 1969 when it also finished fourth.

It was around 1968 that the nickname the "Mustangs" was adopted by the Box Hill Football Club. When the club joined the VFA it was known as the "White Horses" and for a brief period during the mid-1960s was known as the "Stranglers", an obscure name which did not catch on.

Box Hill's improved form during 1969 was the launching place for a successful 1970 season in which it played Coburg in its first VFA grand final. Box Hill finished third on the ladder and defeated Brunswick in the first semi-final and Sunshine in the preliminary final to qualify for the grand final. Its opponent Coburg had lost only twice during the course of the season but both of these losses were to Box Hill and the Mustangs were therefore given a good chance of winning promotion. Coburg took the lead early and were never seriously threatened thereafter, winning 20.17 (137) to 16.11 (107).

After missing the finals narrowly in 1971 and 1972, a financial crisis caused by the collapse of the club's Saturday night dance and promises of large player contracts led to Box Hill granting nearly all of its paid players open clearances prior to the 1973 season. This precipitated a horror nine-year period for the club; between 1973 and 1981 it played 162 games for 18 wins, 143 losses and 1 draw. During those nine seasons, Box Hill finished last five times and second last four times and failed to win a game in both the 1973 and 1977 seasons.

Box Hill reached its lowest point in November 1980 when the incumbent committee, burdened by huge accumulated debts and years of poor on-field performances, resigned and called a public meeting at which the club was to be disbanded unless a new committee could be formed. A new committee headed by former club president John Zigouras took over the administration of the club and immediately introduced two administrative reforms. Firstly, former Box Hill player Keith Ralph Jnr was appointed as general manager, making Box Hill the first VFA club to have a full-time, paid administrator. Secondly the club addressed its financial problems by becoming one of the first sporting clubs in Victoria to gain a permit to conduct bingo sessions.

Box Hill's financial position was stabilised in 1981 and thereafter the club's on-field performances improved rapidly culminating in an outstanding 1984 season in which Box Hill claimed its first VFA premiership in overwhelming fashion, losing only two games for the season and achieving the highest ever score and greatest winning margin ever recorded in a VFA grand final in defeating Oakleigh by 135 points, 32.23(215) to 11.14(80).

For Box Hill, in 1985 its first appearance in first division in 24 years unfortunately coincided with the VFA restructuring its competition. In mid-season it was announced that the bottom 3 teams on the first division ladder would be relegated, rather than the last placed club only. The result for Box Hill was that it immediately returned to second division after just 1 year back in the higher grade.

Box Hill responded by immediately claiming the 1986 second division premiership. It won the first 6 games of the season and thereafter maintained a place near the top of the ladder, finishing 2nd with just 3 losses. Box Hill defeated Sunshine in the second semi-final and again in the grand final to claim its 2nd premiership in 3 years. The grand final was closely fought with Box Hill steadying with the final 2 goals of the match to win by 18 points, 14.14(98) to 11.14(80). The grand final was marred by numerous spiteful incidents, with 6 Sunshine players reported on a total of 13 charges. Not one Box Hill player was reported.

Back in first division Box Hill steadily improved and between 1989 and 1994 experienced its most successful period during its years in the VFA competition, with 4 finals appearances in 6 years. In 1989 former Carlton premiership player Peter Francis guided the club to 3rd place, equalling its best VFA result to that time. In 1991 and 1992 Shane Molloy became the first coach to guide the Mustangs into consecutive finals series. In 1994 Box Hill finished 2nd on the ladder and reached its first major VFA grand final under the coaching of John Murphy. Box Hill established a 24-point lead at 3/4 time against the more favoured Sandringham team but was overrun in the final quarter, losing narrowly 10.9(69) to 11.12(78).

Box Hill's most successful VFA era ironically coincided with the decline of the VFA competition and its ultimate demise. After a high point of 24 clubs in 1983, the competition had dwindled to only 12 clubs by the 1994 season and more significantly the central administration of the VFA was in severe financial difficulty. In order to avoid total collapse, the central administration of the VFA relinquished control of the VFA competition at the end of the 1994 season; it was transferred to the Victorian State Football League which had previously been responsible for establishing and administering the TAC Cup competition. The new administration disbanded the VFA Under 19s and did not offer Dandenong Redlegs, Oakleigh and Prahran licenses in the VFA competition for the 1995 season, leaving just 9 clubs to compete for the VFA premiership for the final time. Box Hill narrowly missed the finals in the last year of VFA competition, finishing 6th.

=== VFL years and Hawthorn alignment ===
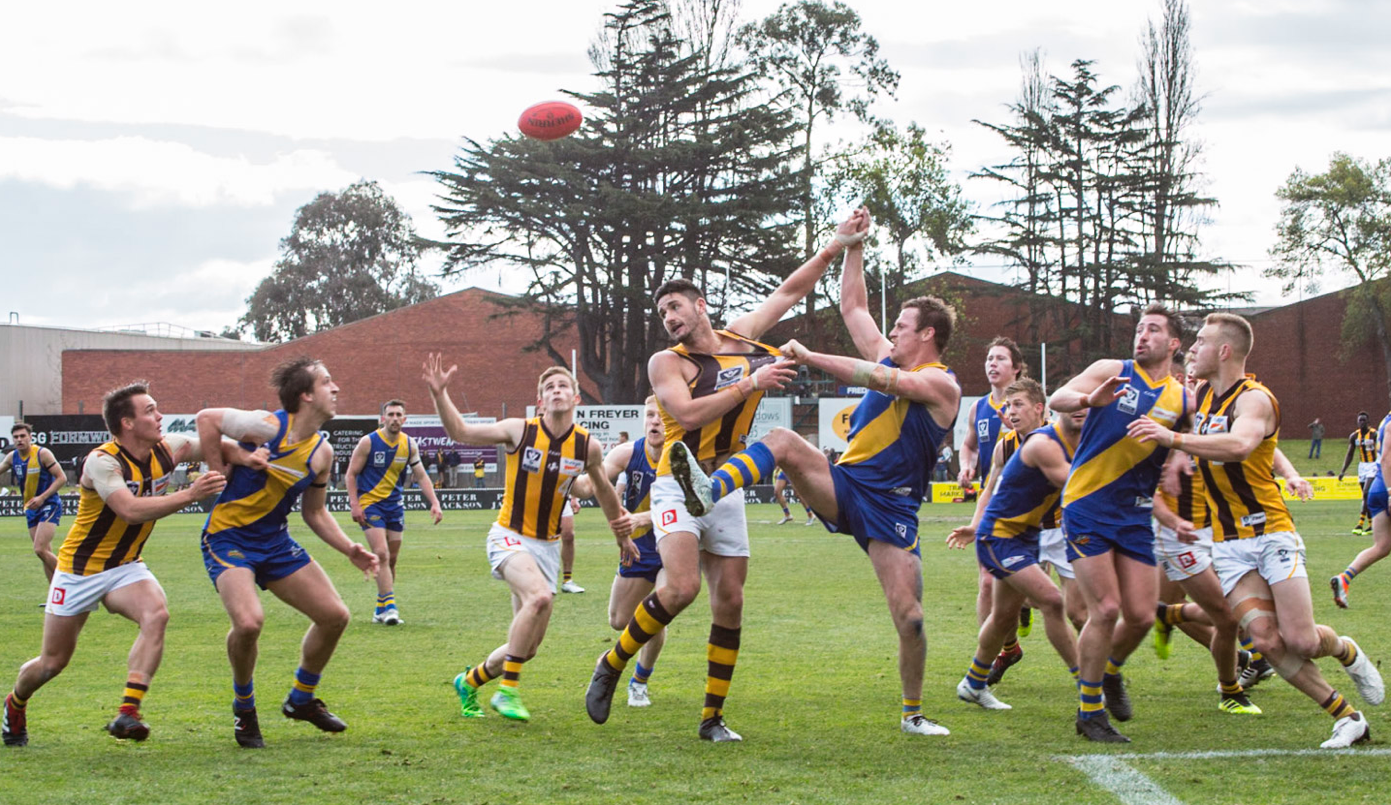
Williamstown vs Box Hill at North Port Oval in the 2nd Preliminary Final of the 2018 VFL season

The creation of the Australian Football League from the previous Victorian Football League in 1990 had left a structural void within the heartland of Australian rules football, with no Victorian state-based competition to provide a player pathway from the elite Under 18s TAC Cup competition.

At the end of the 1998 season, the administrations of the AFL and VFL adopted the recommendations of the "Busse Report", which recommended the amalgamation of the Victorian-based AFL reserves with the VFL competition into a revamped and stronger VFL commencing in season 2000. Victorian-based AFL clubs were to be permitted to participate in the VFL competition either by fielding its reserves teams or by entering into an "alignment" partnership with an existing VFL club, whereby the VFL club hosted players from the AFL club, effectively fielding a hybrid team.

Due to the complexities involved in finalising the details of such an arrangement, only 3 AFL clubs participated in an "alignment" partnership in the VFL in 2000. On 23 December 1999, Box Hill and Hawthorn created one of the first such partnerships, considered to be one of the more natural and logical of such arrangements, due to such factors as both clubs wearing brown and gold playing uniforms and Box Hill being geographically located within the heartland of Hawthorn's membership and supporter base. Moreover, Hawthorn's training base Glenferrie Oval was wholly unsuited to state league football, making the prospect of Hawthorn players playing at a quality suburban venue such as Box Hill City Oval an attractive one for that club. As part of the alignment partnership, Box Hill dropped its "Mustangs" nickname in favour of the "Hawks" nickname of Hawthorn but its brown and gold playing uniform with the large white horse emblem remained unchanged.

The early years of the restructured VFL competition handed a considerable advantage to clubs which had entered into "alignment" partnerships; the blend of full-time, professional AFL listed players with a smaller number of VFL players on most occasions proved to be too strong for "stand alone" VFL clubs composed entirely of part-time, semi-professional footballers. Such was the case for the Box Hill Hawks, which between 2000 and 2005 completed the most successful period of its long history, with 6 consecutive finals appearances.

The Box Hill Hawks claimed its first major division VFL premiership in 2001 under the coaching of former North Melbourne player and Werribee coach Donald McDonald. After finishing the home-and-away season in 2nd place with 15 wins and 5 losses, it defeated Springvale and the Murray Kangaroos to claim a grand final berth against Werribee. Werribee had only lost two games for the season and had twice comfortably defeated the Box Hill Hawks during the home-and-away round, but Box Hill jumped Werribee early and by halfway through the 2nd quarter had established a lead of more than six goals which Werribee was unable to threaten. In the end the Box Hill won comfortably by 37 points, 13.13(91) to Werribee 7.12(54).

The Box Hill Hawks again played in the grand final in 2003 under the coaching of former Western Bulldogs champion and 1990 Brownlow Medallist Tony Liberatore. During the course of the season, the Box Hill Hawks established a club record of 13 consecutive wins, but after losing the qualifying final to Williamstown (Box Hill's 1,000th match in VFA/VFL competition), it defeated Werribee and Sandringham in knock-out finals to qualify for a grand final rematch against Williamstown. Williamstown, at that time aligned to Collingwood, fielded an unprecedented 16 AFL listed players in its grand final team and proved too strong for the Box Hill Hawks, which fought hard after it trailed by more than seven goals at half-time; Williamstown eventually prevailed by 29 points 13.14(92) to the Box Hill Hawks 9.9(63).

The 2004 season saw the Box Hill Hawks stage a dramatic mid-season turn around in its fortunes. Following a large turn-over of players after the 2003 grand final defeat, Box Hill lost the opening 6 games of the 2004 season under new coach Andy Collins and after 9 rounds was still last on the ladder with just 1 win. It then proceeded to win 12 games out of 13, winning its way through to the preliminary final before losing to Port Melbourne, just one victory away from a third grand final appearance in four seasons. The Box Hill Hawks made a 6th successive finals series in 2005 but bowed out in the first final, well beaten by Port Melbourne, and missed the finals for the next three years.

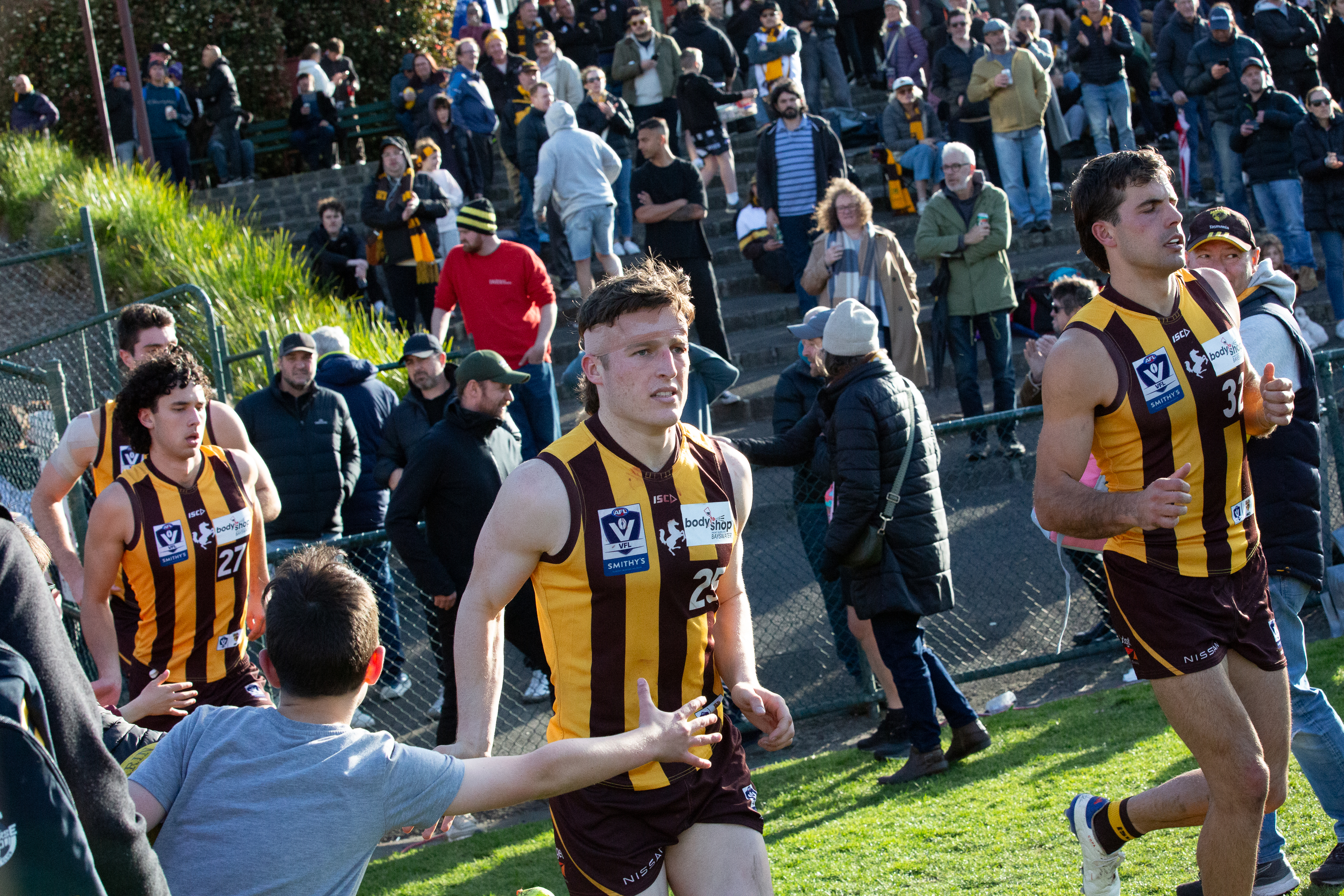
Hawthorn-listed players running out for Box Hill in 2024

Box Hill returned to the finals in 2009 for the first time since 2005 following a strong recruiting drive which yielded ex-Melbourne player Adem Yze and former AFL listed players Sam Iles and Ed Curnow. Under first-year coach Brendon Bolton, the team finished 5th on the ladder with 12 wins and 6 losses. It defeated Geelong in the First Elimination Final before narrowly losing an epic semi-final to Port Melbourne 19.10(124) to 19.14 (128) in a game rated as one of the best played in the VFL for many years.

The Box Hill Hawks built on its improved form in 2009 with another strong performance in 2010, again under the leadership of Brendon Bolton. After an indifferent start to the season, the team came home strongly with seven consecutive wins in the second half of the season to again finish 5th on the ladder. In circumstances uncannily reminiscent of the previous season, the Box Hill Hawks won its Elimination Final in strong fashion and again met Port Melbourne in the First Semi-final. In a tense match played in quagmire conditions on Port Melbourne's home ground; the Box Hill Hawks defeated Port Melbourne for the first time in a finals game 14.11(95) to 12.17(89); the winning goal coming in the dying seconds. North Ballarat ended the Box Hill Hawks season in the Preliminary Final the following week, the match played at Box Hill City Oval.

Under a new senior coach, Springvale games record holder Damian Carroll, the Box Hill Hawks experienced an inconsistent season in 2011, winning just 7 games and losing a number by narrow margins to fall into 8th place on the ladder and qualify for a 3rd successive finals appearance. With a severely weakened team due to Hawthorn resting a number of its A.F.L. players, the Box Hill Hawks fought hard in the Elimination Final against Werribee before going down by 26 points. Carroll departed in 2013. The team's current head coach is David Mirra.

== Records ==
=== Club achievements ===
Premierships
Competition	Level	Wins	Years won
Victorian Football League	Seniors (Division 1)	4	2001, 2013, 2018, 2026
Victorian Football League	Seniors (Division 2)	2	1984, 1986
VFA/VFL Reserves	Division 1	5	2006, 2009, 2010, 2011, 2016
VFA/VFL Thirds	Division 2	2	1968, 1976
Eastern Suburbs Football League	A Grade	1	1939
Eastern Suburbs Football League	East Section	2	1945, 1946
Finishing positions
Victorian Football League (Division 1)	Minor premiership	1	2015
Victorian Football League (Division 1)	Grand Finalists	4	1994, 2003, 2014, 2015
Victorian Football League (Division 1)	Wooden spoons	2	1951, 1961

=== Highs and lows ===
==== Seniors ====
Most consecutive wins	13 (2003)
Most consecutive losses	28^{*} (1976 to 1978)
Highest score	Box Hill 44.22(286) v Sunshine 6.12(48) (1983)
Lowest score	Box Hill 2.4(16) v Sunshine 2.8(20) (1963)
Highest score against	Williamstown 42.18(270) v Box Hill 13.16(94) (1985)
Lowest score against	Dandenong 1.5(11) v Box Hill 17.16(118) (1958)
Greatest winning margin	254 points: Box Hill 39.33(267) v Sunshine 2.1(13) (1984)
Greatest losing margin	180 points: Box Hill 9.7(61) v Waverley 36.25(241) (1981)
Highest 1st Quarter	14.3(87) v Williamstown (1978)
Highest 2nd Quarter	13.5(83) v Sunshine (1983)
Highest 3rd Quarter	13.4(82) v Brunswick/Broadmeadows (1991) (Match expunged); 13.3(81) v Sunshine (1984)
Highest 4th Quarter	14.4(88) v Northcote (1986)
Most senior games	180: Jack Wright (1951 to 1960)
Most senior goals	340: Paul Bolton (1983 to 1990)
Most goals in a game	12: Paul Bolton v Northcote (1986); 12: Paul Bolton v Frankston (1987)

^{*} Sequence of losses ended by a draw followed by 4 further losses, i.e. 33 matches without a win.

==== Reserves ====
Most consecutive wins	20 (2009 to 2010)
Most consecutive losses	15 (1975 to 1976)
Highest score	Box Hill 54.41(365) v Kilsyth 3.5(23) (1984)
Lowest score	Box Hill 1.2(8) v Preston 26.19(175) (1985)
Highest score against	Brunswick 52.33(345) v Box Hill 2.3(15) (1973)
Lowest score against	Brighton 0.1(1) v Box Hill 27.22(184) (1960)
Greatest winning margin	342 points: 54.41(365) v Kilsyth 3.5(23) (1984)
Greatest losing margin	330 points: Box Hill 2.3(15) v Brunswick 52.33(345) (1973)

Thirds Grade – 1952 to 1994

Most consecutive wins	20 (1976)
Most consecutive losses	24 (1978 to 1979)
Highest score	Box Hill 51.23(329) v Mordialloc 3.6(24) (1986)
Lowest score	Box Hill 0.1(1) v Sunshine 18.13(121) (1969)
Highest score against	Northcote 36.34(250) v Box Hill 2.6(18) (1980)
Lowest score against	Caulfield 0.0(0) v Box Hill 38.25(253) (1986)
Greatest winning margin	315 points: 51.22(328) v Yarraville 2.1(13) (1983)
Greatest losing margin	232 points: Box Hill 2.6(18) v Northcote 36.34(250) (1980)

=== Best and fairests ===
==== Seniors ====
1960	Don Brown	JJ Liston Trophy	VFA
1961	Doug Beasy	JJ Liston Trophy	VFA Division One
1973	Geoff Bryant	J Field Medal	VFA Division Two
1975	Geoff Bryant	J Field Medal	VFA Division Two
1984	Peter Nicholson	J Field Medal	VFA Division Two
2002	Sam Mitchell	JJ Liston Trophy	VFL
2013	Mitch Hallahan	JJ Liston Trophy	VFL
2014	Alex Woodward	JJ Liston Trophy	VFL

==== Reserves ====
1964	Ivor Witnish	Doug Disher Medal	VFA Division Two
1966	Fred Bayes	Doug Disher Medal	VFA Division Two
1967	Fred Bayes	Doug Disher Medal	VFA Division Two
1971	Fred Bayes	Doug Disher Medal	VFA Division Two
1989	Gary Woods	A Todd Medal	VFA
1995	Mark Gottliebsen	A Todd Medal	VFA
2003	Ryan Cassidy	A Todd Medal	VFL
2009	Joel Cross	A Todd Medal	VFL
2014	Peter McEvoy	A Todd Medal	AFL Victoria Development League

==== Thirds ====
1962	Bob Hunt	F Gomez Medal	VFA Division Two
1964	Geoff Bryant	F Gomez Medal	VFA Division Two
1970	Geoff O'Reilly	F Gomez Medal	VFA Division Two
1982	Peter Treseder	F Gomez Medal	VFA Division Two
1989	Don Velona	AG Gillon Medal	VFA
1994	Anthony Bennett	AG Gillon Medal	VFA

=== Record against other clubs ===
==== Seniors ====
	played	won	lost	drawn	highest	lowest
Present Clubs:
-v- Casey Demons	64	30	34	—	28.13(181) (1983)	3.9(27) (2011)
-v- Coburg	81	37	43	1	26.5(161) (2015)	5.7(37) (1996)
-v- Collingwood	16	8	8	—	23.15(153) (2012)	7.15(57) (2010); 7.15(57) (2016)
-v- Essendon	11	4	7	—	18.18(126) (2001)	7.9(51) (2018)
-v- Footscray	8	5	2	1	18.12(120) (2015)	10.8(68) (2016)
-v- Frankston	75	38	36	1	30.13(193) (2002)	3.13(31) (2005)
-v- Geelong	29	19	10	—	21.20(146) (2005)	9.11(65) (2009)
-v- North Melbourne	2	—	2	—	11.7(73) (2018); 10.13(73) (2019)	11.7(73) (2018); 10.13(73) (2019)
-v- Northern Blues	70	40	28	2	26.17(173) (1992)	4.8(32) (1963)
-v- Port Melbourne	77	23	53	1	26.13(169) (2006)	3.4(22) (1953)
-v- Richmond	9	4	5	—	18.8(116) (2017)	6.12(48) (2018)
-v- Sandringham	75	41	33	1	25.20(170) (1954)	5.8(38) (1961)
-v- Werribee	91	40	51	—	29.24(198) (1972)	3.6(24) (1996)
-v- Williamstown	95	32	60	3	25.16(166) (1978)	3.16(34) (1992)
Former Clubs:
-v- Bendigo Gold	25	17	8	—	24.23(167) (2001)	8.8(56) (2005)
-v- Berwick	5	5	—	—	34.32(236) (1986)	13.22(100) (1983)
-v- Brighton	25	18	7	—	27.16(178) (1960)	5.10(40) (1952)
-v- Brunswick	46	12	34	—	35.24(234) (1991)	3.6(24) (1951)
-v- Camberwell	62	31	30	1	31.26(212) (1989)	5.12(42) (1951)
-v- Carlton	4	4	—	—	18.15(123) (2002)	17.12(114) (2000); 17.12(114) (2001)
-v- Caulfield	24	13	11	—	24.15(159) (1984)	8.2(50) (1973)
-v- Dandenong	22	10	12	—	24.20(164) (1986)	6.10(46) (1991)
-v- Geelong West	16	4	11	1	23.17(155) (1987)	5.6(36) (1964)
-v- Gold Coast	1	1	—	—	19.16(130) (2010)	19.16(130) (2010)
-v- Kilsyth	5	5	—	—	36.17(233) (1984)	18.17(125) (1982)
-v- Moorabbin	24	10	14	—	37.20(242) (1984)	3.10(28) (1954)
-v- Mordialloc	52	20	29	3	36.18(234) (1986)	4.11(35) (1976)
-v- Murray Kangaroos	5	5	—	—	22.13(145) (2002)	13.16(94) (2000)
-v- North Ballarat	31	16	15	—	25.13(163) (2001)	4.5(29) (1998)
-v- Northcote	56	15	41	—	36.21(237) (1984)	3.7(25) (1953)
-v- Oakleigh	48	20	28	—	32.23(215) (1984)	5.1(31) (1952)
-v- Prahran	36	16	17	3	23.18(156) (1986)	3.10(28) (1962)
-v- St Kilda	1	1	—	—	13.10(88) (2000)	13.10(88) (2000)
-v- Sunshine	47	19	27	1	44.22(286) (1983)	2.4(16) (1963)
-v- Tasmania	12	6	5	1	28.22(190) (2001)	9.8(62) (2006)
-v- Traralgon	4	3	1	—	24.12(156) (1997)	7.12(54) (1997)
-v- Waverley	24	6	18	—	21.27(153) (1976)	5.11(41) (1962); 6.5(41) (1981)
-v- Yarraville	43	13	30	—	26.12(168) (1982)	3.10(28) (1951)
Totals	1321	591	710	20		

==== Reserves ====
	played	won	lost	drawn	highest	lowest
-v- Bendigo Bombers	10	10	—	—	32.21(213) (2008)	11.15(81) (2007)
-v- Berwick	5	5	—	—	29.25(199) (1983)	13.11(89) (1983)
-v- Brighton	25	18	7	—	32.23(215) (1960)	4.8(32) (1951)
-v- Brunswick	47	12	34	1	23.14(152) (1991)	2.3(15) (1973)
-v- Camberwell	63	35	27	1	49.22(316) (1990)	2.13(25) (1973)
-v- Casey Demons	73	46	27	—	33.15(213) (1992)	1.7(13) (2011)
-v- Caulfield	24	14	10	—	26.21(177) (1986)	2.3(15) (1973)
-v- Coburg	87	51	35	1	30.15(195) (2014)	3.9(27) (1990)
-v- Dandenong	20	14	6	—	33.19(217) (1993)	4.9(33) (1962)
-v- Frankston	90	50	39	1	35.26(236) (2011)	3.8(26) (1973)
-v- Geelong West	16	7	9	—	54.29(343) (1987)	5.9(39) (1972)
-v- Kilsyth	5	4	1	—	54.41(365) (1984)	8.5(53) (1982)
-v- Moorabbin	25	13	12	—	23.24(162) (1984)	2.9(21) (1956)
-v- Mordialloc	52	25	27	—	40.29(269) (1986)	3.8(26) (1966)
-v- North Ballarat	33	18	15	—	22.18(150) (2009)	4.6(30) (1998)
-v- Northcote	56	15	41	—	36.18(234) (1984)	1.4(10) (1964)
-v- Northern Blues	77	47	30	—	32.16(208) (2000)	1.2(8) (1985)
-v- Oakleigh	48	24	23	1	30.20(200) (1992)	2.14(26) (1959)
-v- Port Melbourne	80	39	40	1	28.22(190) (1987)	3.8(26) (1954)
-v- Prahran	37	16	21	—	34.24(228) (1994)	4.11(35) (1965)
-v- Sandringham	85	42	41	2	28.10(178) (2016)	4.7(31) (1960)
-v- Sunshine	45	18	27	—	44.24(288) (1989)	4.10(34) (1965)
-v- Waverley	25	4	21	—	32.17(209) (1984)	5.8(38) (1980)
-v- Werribee	97	53	43	1	28.17(185) (2016)	4.3(27) (1973)
-v- Williamstown	99	33	64	2	33.27(225) (1995)	3.2(20) (1951)
-v- Yarraville	43	17	26	—	34.20(224) (1983)	2.3(15) (1952)
Totals	1267	630	626	11		

==== Thirds ====
	played	won	lost	drawn	highest	lowest
-v- Berwick	4	4	—	—	29.21(195) (1986)	12.19(91) (1986)
-v- Brighton	21	20	1	—	35.17(227) (1960)	6.10(46) (1954)
-v- Brunswick	41	24	17	—	42.24(276) (1989)	3.2(20) (1956)
-v- Camberwell	60	40	20	—	35.26(246) (1989)	4.11(35) (1958)
-v- Caulfield	24	19	5	—	38.25(253) (1986)	6.5(41) (1973)
-v- Coburg	33	11	20	2	31.17(203) (1994)	1.9(15) (1974)
-v- Dandenong	21	14	7	—	22.24(156) (1992)	6.4(40) (1958)
-v- Frankston	44	23	21	—	39.30(264) (1988)	1.10(16) (1970)
-v- Geelong West	14	11	3	—	47.27(309) (1987)	7.10(52) (1967)
-v- Kilsyth	5	5	—	—	23.17(155) (1984)	15.13(103) (1983)
-v- Moorabbin	25	11	14	—	28.15(183) (1986)	2.2(14) (1954)
-v- Mordialloc	50	36	13	1	51.23(329) (1986)	2.6(18) (1965)
-v- Northcote	54	29	25	—	30.24(204) (1984)	2.2(14) (1956)
-v- Oakleigh	46	26	20	—	33.16(214) (1983)	2.3(15) (1992)
-v- Port Melbourne	27	20	7	—	43.29(287) (1992)	1.5(11) (1952)
-v- Prahran	32	25	7	—	41.17(263) (1994)	4.14(38) (1964)
-v- Preston	34	12	22	—	28.28(196) (1993)	2.4(16) (1985)
-v- Sandringham	29	21	8	—	28.23(191) (1989)	5.11(41) (1956)
-v- Springvale	20	12	8	—	31.20(206) (1993)	4.5(29) (1987)
-v- Sunshine	49	20	29	—	28.24(192) (1982)	0.1(1) (1969)
-v- Waverley	30	6	24	—	23.26(164) (1976)	2.8(20) (1974)
-v- Werribee	53	27	26	—	27.16(178) (1975)	2.5(17) (1979)
-v- Williamstown	37	14	23	—	26.10(166) (1988)	3.6(24) (1955)
-v- Yarraville	38	25	13	—	51.22(328) (1983)	3.7(25) (1952)
Totals	791	455	333	3		

=== Player records ===
==== 100 career games ====
player	games played	years played
Jack Wright	180	1951 to 1960
Keith White	171	1956 to 1967
Ian Bates	165	1959 to 1969
John Baker	155	1966 to 1976
David Mirra	155*	2010 to 2019
Victor Lawther	153	1974 to 1983
Keith Ralph Jnr	149	1966 to 1975; 1977 to 1980
Geoff Bryant	147	1964 to 1968; 1972 to 1976
Bruce Craig	146	1956 to 1963
Peter Nicholson	142	1983 to 1990
David Banfield	137	1988 to 1997
Ron Irvine	134	1952 to 1958
Laurie Zarafa	132	1989 to 1995
Geoff Withers	130	1978 to 1986
Doug Gleeson	127	1982 to 1990
Cliff Eade	125	1953; 1955 to 1961
Tony Brown	125	1984 to 1993
Colin Love	124	1952 to 1958
Bob Green	116	1951 to 1957
David Plunkett	115	1956 to 1961; 1963 to 1965
Alan Dickinson	115	1978 to 1984
Don Brown	113	1955 to 1960
Jarrod O'Neill	108	1989 to 1994; 1996; 1998
Cameron Crowley	106	1992 to 1999
Sam Gibson	103	2006 to 2011
Matthew Ball	102	2001 to 2007
Neil Gray	101	1960 to 1967
Mark Connolly	101	1975; 1977 to 1985
Darron Wilkinson	101	1993 to 1999

==== 100 career goals ====
player	goals	games	years played
Paul Bolton	340	99	1983 to 1990
Darron Wilkinson	287	101	1993 to 1999
Peter Nicholson	279	142	1983 to 1990
John Salvado	236	82	1958 to 1964
Geoff Withers	205	130	1978 to 1986
Geoff Bryant	194	147	1964 to 1968; 1972 to 1976
Don Brown	182	113	1955 to 1960
Laurie Zarafa	175	132	1989 to 1995
Ian Bates	153	165	1959 to 1969
Ted Laskie	136	65	1974 to 1978
Sam Grimley	128	69	2011 to 2015
Dale Carroll	123	21	1984 to 1985
Gary Smith	122	61	1969 to 1972
Greg Barnett	118	84	1966 to 1975
Alan Dickinson	118	115	1978 to 1984
Dale Garth	116	85	1983 to 1988
Cameron Crowley	116	106	1992 to 1999
Keith White	114	171	1956 to 1967
David Buttifant	113	78	1989 to 1993
Les Thompson	112	66	1969 to 1972
Fergus Greene	104	37	2021 to 2023
Mark Kainey	102	49	1981 to 1987
Bill Morris	101	58	1952 to 1954
Colin Cruse	101	84	1979 to 1984

== Seasons ==
=== Seniors ===
Premiers	Grand Finalist	Minor premiers	Finals appearance	Wooden spoon	VFA/VFL leading goalkicker	VFA/VFL best and fairest

Year	League	Finish	W	L	D	President	General Manager	Treasurer	Coach	Captain	Best and fairest	Leading goalkicker	Goals
1936	ESFL B		11	3	1								
1937	ESFL A		16	5									
1938	ESFL A		14	5									
1939	ESFL A		15	6									
1940	ESFL A	N/A	5	13									
1941	ESFL	(Did not compete)											
1942	ESFL	(No season)											
1943	ESFL	(No season)											
1944	ESFL	(No season)											
1945	ESFL E												
1946	ESFL E		15	4	0								
1947	ESFL E		15	3	1								
1948	ESFL		12	7	0								
1949	ESFL		14	6	0								
1950	ESFL		13	6	0								
1951	VFA	14th	0	19	1	W.L. Bassett	S. Fraser	S. Laurie	Harvey Dunn Sr.	A. Mihan	R. Green	M. Maidment	55
1952	VFA	13th	2	18	0	W.L. Bassett	S. Fraser	S. Soffer	Bill Morris	Bill Morris	Bill Morris	B. Coghlan	27
1953	VFA	10th	7	13	0	M.W. Cane	S. Fraser	S. Soffer	Bill Morris	Bill Morris	Bill Morris	T. Allen; A. Hochen	23
1954	VFA	8th	9	11	0	M.W. Cane	S. Fraser	S. Soffer	Bill Morris	Bill Morris	Bill Morris	Bill Morris	57
1955	VFA	7th	10	10	0	E.C. Miechel	S. Fraser	A. Duke	Colin Love	Colin Love	H. Dunn Jnr	D. Brown	50
1956	VFA	4th	15	7	0	E.C. Miechel	S. Fraser	A. Duke	Col Austen	Col Austen	Colin Love	D. Brown	51
1957	VFA	7th	11	9	0	E.C. Miechel	S. Fraser	A. Duke	Col Austen	Colin Love	B. Craig	R. Bennett	36
1958	VFA	3rd	13	6	0	E. Hammond	S. Fraser	A. Duke	Col Austen	Colin Love	A. Gooch	D. Brown	37
1959	VFA	10th	8	12	0	E. Hammond	S. Fraser	D. Marsh	Col Austen	R. Taylor	B. Craig	John Salvado	43
1960	VFA	10th	9	9	0	E. Hammond	S. Fraser	D. Marsh	Doug Beasy	Doug Beasy	D. Brown	John Salvado	39
1961	VFA D1	10th	3	18	1	E. Hammond	S. Fraser	P. Burns	Doug Beasy	Doug Beasy	B. Craig	John Salvado	35
1962	VFA D2	4th	9	8	0	E. Hammond	S. Fraser	P. Burns	Doug Beasy	Doug Beasy	B. Craig	John Salvado	33
1963	VFA D2	5th	9	6	1	R. Shineberg	D. Marsh	P. Burns	Alex Gardiner	Alex Gardiner	B. Craig	John Salvado	56
1964	VFA D2	8th	4	14	0	R. Shineberg	D. Marsh	E. Mansfield	Alex Gardiner	Alex Gardiner	Alex Gardiner	A. Mace	21
1965	VFA D2	6th	6	8	2	R. Shineberg	D. Marsh	E. Mansfield	Alex Gardiner	Alex Gardiner	C. Fellows	A. Mace	31
1966	VFA D2	5th	9	7	2	R. Shineberg	A. Matthews	E. Mansfield	Alex Gardiner	Alex Gardiner	I. Bates	Geoff Bryant	43
1967	VFA D2	8th	6	12	0	R. Shineberg	E. Mansfield	A. Matthews	Alex Gardiner	Alex Gardiner	G. Fellows	C. Fellows	44
1968	VFA D2	10th	3	14	0	R. Shineberg	E. Mansfield	P. Burns	W. Arthur; B. Coghlan	I. Bates	Geoff Bryant	Geoff Bryant	23
1969	VFA D2	4th	9	10	0	R. Shineberg	A. Matthews	P. Burns	J. Walker	J. Walker	Trevor Dawson	J. Walker	57
1970	VFA D2	3rd	14	6	1	R. Harris	A. Matthews	E. Mansfield	G. Ireland	G. Ireland	J. Baker	G. Barnett	38
1971	VFA D2	5th	8	10	0	R. Harris	K. Ralph Snr	I. Hansen	Tassie Johnson	Tassie Johnson	L. Thompson	Greg Barnett	69
1972	VFA D2	7th	6	12	0	B. Coghlan	K. Ralph Snr	T. Smith	K. McNamee	K. McNamee	K. Ralph Jnr	G. Smith	53
1973	VFA D2	10th	0	18	0	B. Coghlan	R. Hopper	L. McQualter	P. Langley; G. Ireland	K. Ralph Jnr	Geoff Bryant	P. Edwards	22
1974	VFA D2	9th	4	14	0	B. Coghlan	D. Wanless	L. McQualter	G. Ireland	Geoff Bryant	A. Curtis	W. Magill	38
1975	VFA D2	10th	1	17	0	J.N. Zigouras	J. Dowsley	J. Brown	Geoff Bryant	Geoff Bryant	Geoff Bryant	E. Laskie	43
1976	VFA D2	9th	6	12	0	J.N. Zigouras	J. Dowsley	J. Morgan	Les Foote	Geoff Bryant	V. Lawther	M. Gordon	47
1977	VFA D2	10th	0	18	0	J.N. Zigouras	J. Dowsley	S. Cromb	W. Kirby; K. Smith	J. Tuckwell	G. Cook	E. Laskie	33
1978	VFA D2	10th	1	16	1	J.N. Zigouras	K. Ralph Snr	S. Cromb	K. Smith	K. Ralph Jnr	M. Connolly	K. Ralph Jnr	34
1979	VFA D2	9th	3	15	0	J.N. Zigouras	K. Ralph Snr	C. McGary	P. Langley	K. Ralph Jnr	Colin Cruse	B. McLerie	34
1980	VFA D2	10th	1	17	0	N. Moore	J. Richards	C. McGary	P. Langley	Colin Cruse	S. Harper	G. Withers	40
1981	VFA D2	9th	2	16	0	J.N. Zigouras	K. Ralph Jnr	S. Cromb	Peter Pettigrew	Peter Pettigrew	Peter Pettigrew	G. Withers	27
1982	VFA D2	5th	10	8	0	J.N. Zigouras	K. Ralph Jnr	K. Ralph Jnr	Eric Moore	M. Connolly	S. Witnish	Eric Moore	35
1983	VFA D2	5th	11	6	1	J.N. Zigouras	K. Ralph Jnr	K. Ralph Jnr	Eric Moore	G. Withers	Peter Nicholson	P. Bolton	49
1984	VFA D2	1st	16	2	0	J.N. Zigouras	K. Ralph Jnr	G. Ralph	Eric Moore	G. Withers	Peter Nicholson	Dale Carroll	110
1985	VFA D1	11th	3	14	1	J.N. Zigouras	E. Sutherland	S. Cromb	Eric Moore	G. Withers	S. Teakel	Peter Nicholson	33
1986	VFA D2	2nd	17	3	0	W. White	E. Sutherland	S. Cromb	Richard Murrie	Richard Murrie	D. Bourke	P. Bolton	55
1987	VFA D1	9th	4	13	1	W. White	E. Sutherland	S. Cromb	Harold Martin	Mark Turner	Peter Nicholson	P. Bolton	65
1988	VFA D1	7th	8	10	0	J.N. Zigouras	M. Kainey	L. Robertson	Harold Martin	Mark Turner	D. Pevitt	P. Bolton	32
1989	VFA	3rd	16	5	1	J.N. Zigouras	M. Kainey	L. Robertson	Peter Francis	Peter Francis	L. Zarafa	P. Bolton	77
1990	VFA	9th	8	10	0	J.N. Zigouras	Michael Reeves	J. Ure	Peter Francis	Peter Francis	Mark Lisle	L. Zarafa	41
1991	VFA	3rd	14	8	0	J.N. Zigouras	N. Dalrymple	J. Ure	Shane Molloy	Mark Lisle	L. Zarafa	A. Byrne	44
1992	VFA	5th	11	9	0	J.N. Zigouras	N. Dalrymple	J. Ure	Shane Molloy	Mark Lisle	C. Watson	Stephen James	28
1993	VFA	6th	10	8	0	J.N. Zigouras	B. McMahon	J. Ure	John Murphy	Mark Lisle	David Banfield	Mark Erwin; Stephen James	35
1994	VFA	2nd	15	7	0	J.N. Zigouras	G. Randall	J. Ure	John Murphy	David Banfield	Tim Livingstone	Darron Wilkinson	75
1995	VFA	6th	8	8	0	G.D. Cohen	G. Randall	A. Panther	John Murphy	David Banfield	Z. Badrock	Darron Wilkinson	37
1996	VFL	10th	6	12	0	G.D. Cohen	G. Randall	J. Ure	John Murphy	David Banfield	D. Payne	Darron Wilkinson	37
1997	VFL	9th	5	12	1	R.S. Collier	G. Randall	J. Ure	John Murphy	Tim Livingstone	Tim Livingstone	Darron Wilkinson	30
1998	VFL	9th	5	13	0	R.S. Collier	G. Randall	J. Ure	John Murphy	Darron Wilkinson	C. Crowley	Darron Wilkinson	42
1999	VFL	8th	6	11	1	R.S. Collier	G. Randall	J. Ure	B. Mason	Darron Wilkinson	Adam Slater	Darron Wilkinson	38
2000	VFL	7th	13	7	0	A.J. Pinwill	A. McDonald	J. Ure	Donald McDonald	B. Hartin	M. Brewer	S. Habberfield	22
2001	VFL	2nd	18	5	0	A.J. Pinwill	L. Jervis	J. Ure	Donald McDonald	M. Brewer	John Baird	M. Passador	32
2002	VFL	7th	12	8	1	A.J. Pinwill	A. Pirchan	J. Ure	Donald McDonald	M. Brewer	Sam Mitchell	M. Passador	67
2003	VFL	3rd	16	6	0	J.D. Ure	A. Pirchan	not appointed	Tony Liberatore	Andrew Pugsley	Matthew Ball	Stephen Kenna	45
2004	VFL	7th	12	9	0	J.D. Ure	A. Pirchan	not appointed	Andrew Collins	C. Alleway	S. Bailey	C. Alleway	35
2005	VFL	8th	7	12	0	J.D. Ure	A. Pirchan	not appointed	Andrew Collins	C. Alleway	Steven Greene	C. Alleway	34
2006	VFL	10th	6	12	0	J.D. Ure	A. Pirchan	not appointed	D. Christensen	K. Height	Matthew Ball	Matt Little	35
2007	VFL	12th	4	13	1	J.D. Ure	A. Pirchan	not appointed	D. Christensen	K. Height	Nick Smith	Matt Little	35
2008	VFL	11th	6	14	0	J.D. Ure	A. Pirchan	not appointed	Barry Mitchell	A. Neville	Stephen Kenna	Beau Dowler	21
2009	VFL	5th	13	7	0	J.D. Ure	A. Pirchan	not appointed	Brendon Bolton	Lukas Markovic; Stephen Kenna	Sam Iles	Cameron Pedersen	35
2010	VFL	5th	13	8	0	J.D. Ure	A. McLeish	not appointed	Brendon Bolton	Stephen Kenna	Ed Curnow	Sam Gibson	31
2011	VFL	8th	7	12	0	A.J. Pinwill	E. Fenton	not appointed	Damian Carroll	Sam Gibson	Sam Gibson	Jordan Lisle	27
2012	VFL	7th	10	10	0	A.J. Pinwill	E. Fenton	not appointed	Damian Carroll	Beau Muston; Daniel Pratt	Tom Schneider	Daniel Pratt	36
2013	VFL	2nd	16	5	0	A.J. Pinwill	Paul Barnard	not appointed	Damian Carroll	Daniel Pratt	Kyle Cheney	S. Grimley	28
2014	VFL	4th	15	5	1	A.J. Pinwill	Paul Barnard	not appointed	Marco Bello	David Mirra	Sam Iles	Sam Grimley	45
2015	VFL	1st	16	5	0	A.J. Pinwill	C. Nanni	not appointed	Marco Bello	David Mirra	Jonathan Simpkin	Sam Grimley	46
2016	VFL	10th	7	11	0	A.J. Pinwill	C. Nanni	not appointed	Marco Bello	David Mirra	David Mirra	Blake Hardwick; Teia Miles; Kade Stewart	16
2017	VFL	2nd	14	5	1	A.J. Pinwill	D. Napoli	not appointed	Chris Newman	David Mirra	Max Warren	Ty Vickery	27
2018	VFL	6th	16	6	0	A.J. Pinwill	D. Napoli	not appointed	Chris Newman	Andrew Moore	Andrew Moore	Mitchell Lewis	38
2019	VFL	8th	9	9	1	Ed Sill	D. Napoli	not appointed	Max Bailey	Andrew Moore	David Mirra	J. Ross	35
2020	VFL	(No season)				Ed Sill	Stephen Gilham	not appointed	Max Bailey	Damian Mascitti	(No season)		
2021	VFL	3rd	8	2	0	Ed Sill	T. Tyler	not appointed	Sam Mitchell	Damian Mascitti	Damian Mascitti	Fergus Greene	30
2022	VFL	8th	11	8	0	Ed Sill	Pat Clancey	not appointed	Clint Proctor	Hugh Beasley	Callum Porter	Fergus Greene	53
2023	VFL	3rd	15	6	0	Ed Sill	Pat Clancey	not appointed	Zane Littlejohn	Hugh Beasley/ Callum Porter	Callum Brown	Jaylon Thorpe	36
2024	VFL	6th	12	6	0	Ed Sill	Pat Clancey	not appointed	Zane Littlejohn	Callum Porter	Jai Serong	Jack O'Sullivan	17

- Position of General Manager known as Secretary until 1981
- Although Box Hill finished third in 2021, no finals series was held as the season was curtailed due to the COVID-19 pandemic

=== Reserves ===
Premiers	Grand Finalist	Minor premiers	Finals appearance	Wooden spoon	Reserves leading goalkicker	Reserves best and fairest

Year	League	Finish	W	L	D	Coach	Captain	Best and fairest	Leading goalkicker	Goals	Ref
1951	VFA	12th	5	15	0						
1952	VFA	13th	3	16	1						
1953	VFA	7th	10	10	0						
1954	VFA	11th	4	14	2						
1955	VFA	10th	7	13	0						
1956	VFA	2nd	16	7	0						
1957	VFA	5th	14	6	0						
1958	VFA	3rd	15	5	0						
1959	VFA	5th	14	6	0						
1960	VFA	4th	14	6	0						
1961	VFA D1	7th	8	13	0						
1962	VFA D2	5th	6	10	0						
1963	VFA D2	5th	8	8	0						
1964	VFA D2	5th	8	10	0						
1965	VFA D2	7th	3	13	0						
1966	VFA D2	7th	6	12	0						
1967	VFA D2	9th	4	14	0						
1968	VFA D2	9th	3	14	0						
1969	VFA D2	9th	4	14	0						
1970	VFA D2	4th	11	7	1						
1971	VFA D2	2nd	14	6	1						
1972	VFA D2	7th	6	12	0						
1973	VFA D2	10th	2	16	0						
1974	VFA D2	8th	5	12	1						
1975	VFA D2	10th	2	16	0						
1976	VFA D2	9th	3	15	0						
1977	VFA D2	9th	6	12	0						
1978	VFA D2	7th	7	11	0						
1979	VFA D2	10th	2	16	0						
1980	VFA D2	10th	2	16	0						
1981	VFA D2	8th	5	13	0						
1982	VFA D2	6th	8	10	0						
1983	VFA D2	6th	12	6	0						
1984	VFA D2	2nd	15	4	0						
1985	VFA D1	10th	5	13	0						
1986	VFA D2	4th	15	5	0						
1987	VFA D1	5th	10	8	0						
1988	VFA D1	9th	5	13	0						
1989	VFA	4th	13	7	0						
1990	VFA	9th	9	9	0						
1991	VFA	7th	8	11	0						
1992	VFA	4th	12	7	0						
1993	VFA	3rd	16	5	0						
1994	VFA	3rd	13	7	0						
1995	VFA	5th	12	8	0						
1996	VFL	5th	8	10	0						
1997	VFL	7th	8	10	0						
1998	VFL	8th	7	11	0						
1999	VFL	6th	10	9	0						
2000	VFL	2nd	15	5	0						
2001	VFL	3rd	11	6	1						
2002	VFL	4th	12	8	0						
2003	VFL	8th	6	12	0						
2004	VFL	7th	8	9	1						
2005	VFL	5th	9	9	1						
2006	VFL	4th	14	8	0						
2007	VFL	5th	10	8	1						
2008	VFL	3rd	12	8	0						
2009	VFL	1st	17	3	0				Chris Hoegel	49	
2010	VFL	2nd	16	4	0						
2011	VFL	1st	18	2	0	Marco Bello	Luke Kitchin				
2012	VFL DL	3rd	12	9	0	Marco Bello					
2013	VFL DL	2nd	13	6	1						
2014	VFL DL	2nd	13	6	0				Peter McEvoy	56	
2015	VFL DL	1st	17	1	0						
2016	VFL DL	1st	15	3	0		Jake Summers		Jake Summers	30	
2017	VFL DL	3rd	9	8	0				Dale Hehir	34	

=== Thirds ===
Premiers	Grand Finalist	Minor premiers	Finals appearance	Wooden spoon	Thirds leading goalkicker	Thirds best and fairest

Year	League	Finish	W	L	D	Coach	Captain	Best and fairest	Leading goalkicker	Goals	Ref
1952	VFA	11th	5	12	0						
1953	VFA	6th	11	6	0						
1954	VFA	5th	11	5	1						
1955	VFA	3rd	14	5	0						
1956	VFA	8th	8	9	0						
1957	VFA	9th	6	11	0						
1958	VFA	6th	9	6	0						
1959	VFA	8th	9	8	0						
1960	VFA	1st	15	2	0						
1961	VFA D1	1st	16	4	0						
1962	VFA D2	5th	7	8	0						
1963	VFA D2	2nd	14	3	1						
1964	VFA D2	3rd	13	6	0						
1965	VFA D2	8th	3	13	0						
1966	VFA D2	7th	7	11	0						
1967	VFA D2	5th	8	10	0						
1968	VFA D2	2nd	17	2	0						
1969	VFA D2	8th	4	14	0						
1970	VFA D2	5th	11	7	0						
1971	VFA D2	1st	16	5	0				Peter Richardson	85	
1972	VFA D2	6th	9	9	0						
1973	VFA D2	5th	10	8	0						
1974	VFA D2	8th	4	14	0						
1975	VFA D2	4th	15	6	0						
1976	VFA D2	1st	20	0	0		Greg Parry				
1977	VFA D2	5th	11	7	0						
1978	VFA D2	8th	5	13	0						
1979	VFA D2	10th	0	18	0						
1980	VFA D2	9th	5	13	0						
1981	VFA D2	7th	8	10	0						
1982	VFA D2	4th	11	8	0						
1983	VFA D2	4th	15	5	0				John O'Neil	154	
1984	VFA	9th	10	7	0						
1985	VFA	14th	8	11	0						
1986	VFA D2	3rd	16	4	0						
1987	VFA D1	8th	7	11	0						
1988	VFA D1	3rd	12	7	0						
1989	VFA	1st	14	5	1						
1990	VFA	3rd	15	6	0						
1991	VFA	1st	19	3	0						
1992	VFA	5th	11	8	0						
1993	VFA	2nd	13	7	0						
1994	VFA	5th	13	6	0						

=== Women's ===
Premiers	Grand Finalist	Minor premiers	Finals appearance	Wooden spoon	VFLW leading goalkicker	Lambert–Pearce Medal

Year	League	Finish	W	L	D	Coach	Captain	Best and fairest	Leading goalkicker	Goals	Ref
2017	VFLW	8th	3	11	0	Patrick Hill	Melissa Kuys	Emma Mackie	Emily Gilder	17	
2023	VFLW	4th	8	4	2	Cherie O'Neill	Nicole Garner	Jordan Mifsud	Maddie Boyd; Mietta Kendall	7	
2024	VFLW	3rd	8	5	1	Michael Ericson	Tamara Luke	Tamara Luke	Tamara Luke	20	

== VFL/AFL players ==
The following are players who have played at least 1 VFL/AFL game or are currently on an AFL list and yet to play an AFL game:

Player	Draft	Drafted By	Played With	Total AFL Games
Andy Goodwin	1987 National	Richmond	Richmond (56 games); Melbourne (17 games)	73
Peter Bourke	1988 National	Essendon	Essendon (1 game); Fitzroy (22 games)	23
Grant Lawrie	1989 National	St Kilda	Fitzroy (151 games); St Kilda (17 games)	168
Ron De Iulio	1991 National	Carlton	Carlton	104
Tim Livingstone	1992 Mid-Year	Richmond	Richmond	8
Jarrod Molloy	1993 National	Fitzroy (father/son rule)	Fitzroy (59 games); Brisbane (61 games); Collingwood (49 games)	169
Andrew Nichol	1995 Pre-Season	Footscray	Footscray	3
Matthew Bishop	1997 Rookie	Melbourne	Melbourne (18 games); Port Adelaide (132 games)	150
Troy Simmonds	1999 Pre-Season	Melbourne	Melbourne (40 games); Fremantle (64 games); Richmond (93 games)	197
Simon Godfrey	1999 National	Melbourne	Melbourne	105
Sam Mitchell	2001 National	Hawthorn	Hawthorn (307 games); West Coast Eagles (22 games)	329
John Baird	2002 Rookie	Kangaroos	Kangaroos	46
Michael Firrito	2003 Rookie	Kangaroos	Kangaroos	275
Matthew Ball	2003 National	Hawthorn	Hawthorn	17
Stephen Kenna	2003 National	Carlton	Carlton	5
Laurence Angwin	2003 Rookie	Carlton	Carlton	4
Michael Rix	2004 Rookie	Hawthorn	St Kilda	29
Simon Taylor	2004 National	Hawthorn	Hawthorn	85
Cameron Howat	2005 Rookie	Richmond	Richmond	21
Ben McGlynn	2005 Rookie	Hawthorn	Hawthorn (44 games); Sydney (127 games)	171
Lukas Markovic	2009 National	Western Bulldogs	Western Bulldogs	29
Sam Iles	2009 Rookie	Gold Coast Suns	Collingwood (7 games); Gold Coast Suns (26 games)	33
Ed Curnow	2010 Rookie	Carlton	Carlton	221
Cameron Pedersen	2010 Rookie	North Melbourne	North Melbourne (16 games); Melbourne (64 games)	80
Robert Campbell	2010 Rookie	Melbourne	Hawthorn	116
Jarrad Boumann	2011 National	Hawthorn	Hawthorn	2
Sam Gibson	2011 Rookie	North Melbourne	North Melbourne (130 games); Adelaide (5 games)	135
Adam Pattison	2011 Rookie	Hawthorn	Richmond (61 games); St Kilda (5 games)	66
Matt Jones	2012 Draft	Melbourne	Melbourne	61
Sam Collins	2015 AFL draft	Fremantle	Fremantle (14 games); Gold Coast Suns (156 games*)	170*
Sam Switkowski	2017 AFL draft	Fremantle	Fremantle	131*
David Mirra	2017 rookie draft	Hawthorn	Hawthorn	11
Ned Reeves	2019 pre-season supplementary selection period	Hawthorn	Hawthorn	58*
Lachlan Bramble	2021 pre-season supplemental selection period	Hawthorn	Hawthorn ( 30 games); Western Bulldogs (72 games)	102*
Jai Newcombe	2021 mid-season rookie draft	Hawthorn	Hawthorn	127*
James Blanck	2022 mid-season rookie draft	Hawthorn	Hawthorn	25*
Ryan Maric	2023 mid-season rookie draft	West Coast	West Coast	63*
Clay Tucker	2023 mid-season rookie draft	Hawthorn	Hawthorn	0
Ethan Stanley	2023 mid-season rookie draft	Fremantle	Fremantle	2
Max Hall	2024 mid-season rookie draft	St Kilda	St Kilda	46*

^{*} Indicates AFL listed player in 2026.
All games totals to the end of the 2026 season.

The following players were drafted from Box Hill but did not play an AFL game: Ashley Byrne (Brisbane – 1991 Mid-Season Draft); Paul Mullarvey (Fitzroy – 1993 National Draft); Matthew Penny (Carlton – 1993 Pre-Season Draft); Michael Georgiadis (Hawthorn – 2002 Rookie Draft); Clinton Alleway (North Melbourne – 2003 Rookie Draft); Doug Scott (Hawthorn – 2004 Pre-Season Draft); Kristan Height (Hawthorn – 2005 Rookie Draft).

== "Greatest Ever Team" ==
(as announced in 2000, covering period 1951 to 2000)

Back	Jack Wright (180 games, 32 goals)	David Banfield (137 games, 5 goals)	John Baker (155 games, 87 goals)
Half-Back	Cliff Eade (125 games, 63 goals)	Bruce Craig (146 games, 34 goals)	Ron Irvine (133 games, 3 goals)
Centre	Keith White (171 games, 109 goals)	Geoff Bryant (147 games, 195 goals)	Alex Gardiner (73 games, 61 goals)
Half Forward	Peter Nicholson (142 games, 279 goals)	David Plunkett (114 games, 91 goals)	Ian Bates (165 games, 156 goals)
Forward	Don Brown (113 games, 181 goals)	Paul Bolton (99 games, 340 goals)	Darron Wilkinson (101 games, 287 goals)
Followers	Bill Morris (58 games, 101 goals)	Tim Livingstone (77 games, 74 goals)	Laurie Zarafa (132 games, 175 goals)
Interchange	Peter Bourke (83 games, 65 goals)	Doug Gleeson (127 games, 74 goals)	Mark Lisle (84 games, 45 goals)
	Colin Love (124 games, 24 goals)		
Captain	Alex Gardiner		
Vice-Captain	Bill Morris		
Coach	Eric Moore		

== "Box Hill Hawks All Stars" ==
(as announced on 24 August 2019 to celebrate 20 seasons of the Box Hill – Hawthorn Alignment 2000 to 2019)

Back	Taylor Duryea	Lukas Markovic	Michael Firrito
Half-Back	Kyle Cheney	David Mirra	Matthew Brewer
Centre	Sam Iles	Sam Mitchell	Ed Curnow
Half Forward	Sam Gibson	Clinton Alleway	Brendan Whitecross
Forward	Stephen Kenna	Cameron Pedersen	Michael Osborne
Followers	Robert Campbell	Josh Kennedy	Ben McGlynn
Interchange	Matthew Ball	Kristan Height	Andrew Moore
	Brad Sewell	Mitch O'Donnell (23rd player)	
Captain	David Mirra		
Coach	Damian Carroll		

== In popular culture ==
- On Sunday 26 June 1988 at a match between Box Hill and Frankston played at Box Hill City Oval, Box Hill coach Harold Martin rode on a cherry picker while delivering his 3/4 time address to the Box Hill team. Martin was serving a suspension that prevented him from entering the playing arena. He circumvented the ban by being hoisted by the cherry picker over the boundary fence and several metres inside the playing arena without actually touching the ground. The incident has been recounted and referred to in several publications since in the context of describing extreme acts that coaches have undertaken in an attempt to motivate their teams.
- In an episode of Kath & Kim (season 2, episode 8), Brett and Kim are shown at a suburban football match. Both are wearing brown and gold scarves and ABC footage of a VFA match played in 1988 between Box Hill and Preston is used. Peter Rowsthorn, who plays the role of Brett, has been Number One Ticket Holder of the Box Hill Hawks Football Club since 2005.

== Club song ==
The club song is identical to the Hawthorn Football Club song, except that "Box Hill" is substituted for "Hawthorn", and is sung to the tune of "Yankee Doodle Dandy".

== Women's team ==
Box Hill were granted a license to compete in the VFL Women's league in 2017. The club won three out of fourteen games in the 2017 season. The license was transferred to AFL-aligned club Hawthorn, who participated in the league under that name from 2018 to 2022, winning the premiership in the 2018 season. In 2023, following Hawthorn's ascension to the AFL Women's competition, the VFLW license was returned to Box Hill, and the club has played under that name in the league ever since.

== Jumpers ==
=== 1936−1974 ===
Brown jumper with a gold vee and small white horse emblem on left hand breast. The white horse emblem was added prior to the 1938 season, coinciding with the club's move from Surrey Park to Box Hill City Oval.

=== 1975−2011 ===
Prior to the 1975 season, the VFA encouraged a number of its member Clubs to adopt a more colourful playing uniform to coincide with the introduction of colour television to Australia. Box Hill adopted its iconic and most widely recognised jumper, consisting of gold and brown vertical thirds (brown in the middle), with a brown back, gold numbers, and a large white "Wild Mustang" logo in the centre of the front of the jumper.

=== 2012−present ===
Box Hill adopted the identical jumper to its AFL affiliate Hawthorn, the only difference being that the white "Wild Mustang" logo was retained, located in the centre of the front of the jumper and approximately half the size that it was previously.
