= 1994 VFA season =

Overview
- Teams: 9
- Premiers: Sandringham; 5th premiership
- Runners-up: Box Hill; 1st runners-up result
- Minor premiers: Sandringham; 4th minor premiership
- Pre-season cup: Frankston; 1st pre-season cup win
- J. J. Liston Trophy: Cory Young (Oakleigh – 20 votes)
- Leading goalkicker: Rino Pretto (Dandenong – 87 goals)

The 1994 VFA season was the 113th season of the Victorian Football Association (VFA), an Australian rules football competition played in the state of Victoria.

The premiership was won by the Sandringham Football Club, after it defeated Box Hill in the grand final on 25 September by nine points; it was the fifth premiership won by the club.

This was the final season contested under the administration of the VFA as an independent body, before control of the competition was ceded to the Victorian State Football League (VSFL) at the end of the year.

== Home-and-away season ==
In the home-and-away season, each team played eighteen games; the top five then contested the finals under the McIntyre final five system. Finals were played for the first time at Victoria Park.

=== Ladder ===
1994 VFA ladder
Pos	Team	Pld	W	L	D	PF	PA	PP	Pts
1	Sandringham (P)	18	16	2	0	2253	1248	180.5	64
2	Box Hill	18	13	5	0	2130	1526	139.6	52
3	Springvale	18	13	5	0	1804	1413	127.7	52
4	Dandenong	18	13	5	0	2048	1812	113.0	52
5	Frankston	18	11	7	0	1975	1640	120.4	44
6	Werribee	18	9	9	0	1803	1663	108.4	36
7	Port Melbourne	18	9	9	0	1827	1773	103.0	36
8	Williamstown	18	8	10	0	1490	1802	82.7	32
9	Preston	18	5	13	0	1512	1884	80.3	20
10	Oakleigh	18	4	14	0	1611	2339	68.9	16
11	Coburg	18	4	14	0	1379	2081	66.3	16
12	Prahran	18	3	15	0	1427	2250	63.4	12

Rules for classification: 1) points; 2) percentage; 3) number of points for.
(P) Premiers

=== Finals ===
	Qualifying final
Saturday, 3 September	Box Hill 10.14 (74)	def.	Springvale 7.14 (56)	Victoria Park (crowd: 1,908)

	Elimination final
Sunday, 4 September	Dandenong 19.15 (129)	def.	Frankston 9.17 (71)	Victoria Park (crowd: 2,316)

	First semi-final
Saturday, 10 September	Springvale 16.19 (115)	def.	Dandenong 11.7 (73)	Victoria Park (crowd: 2,292)

	Second semi-final
Sunday, 11 September	Sandringham 12.21 (93)	def.	Box Hill 12.15 (87)	Victoria Park (crowd: 2,935)

	Preliminary Final
Sunday, 18 September	Box Hill 18.12 (120)	def.	Springvale 7.12 (54)	Victoria Park (crowd: 2,318)

1994 VFA Grand Final
Sunday, 25 September	Sandringham	def.	Box Hill	Victoria Park (crowd: 13,168)
0.2 (2); 2.6 (18); 5.9 (39); 11.12 (78)	Q1; Q2; Q3; Final	3.2 (20); 6.3 (39); 9.9 (63); 10.9 (69)	Umpires: Kieron Nicholls, G. Caulfield; Norm Goss Memorial Medal: Anthony Allen (Sandringham
Gorozidis 5, Allen, Amiet, Foley, Herman, Moloney, Tarpey	Goals	Wilkinson 3, Daly 2, Disney, Evans, Livingstone, Swan, Trewella
Injuries	Bourke, O'Neill

=== Awards ===
- The leading goalkicker for the season was Rino Pretto (Dandenong), who kicked 87 goals including finals.
- The J. J. Liston Trophy was won by Cory Young (Oakleigh), who polled 20 votes. Young finished ahead of Justin Crough (Sandringham), who was second with 17 votes, and Shaun Smith (Werribee), who polled 16 votes.
- The Fothergill–Round Medal was won by Bruce Cohen (Box Hill).
- Sandringham won the reserves premiership for the second consecutive season. Sandringham 15.12 (102) defeated Port Melbourne 10.9 (69) in the grand final, held as a curtain-raiser to the Seniors Grand Final on 25 September. Sandringham also won the Under-19s premiership, giving it the premiership in all three grades for the season.
- Frankston won the pre-season competition. Frankston 15.13 (103) defeated Werribee 15.4 (94) in the grand final, held on 9 April.

== Notable events ==
=== Interleague matches ===
The Association played one interleague match, against the Northern Territory Football League, during 1994. The match was played on 9 April, making it a pre-season match for the Association, and a post-season match for Northern Territory (which plays its season during the Australian summer), giving Northern Territory a form advantage. Northern Territory defeated the Association by 23 points.

	1994 Interleague matches
Saturday, 9 April	V.F.A. 12.8 (80)	def. by	N.T.F.L. 15.13 (103)	Victoria Park

=== Other notable events ===
- Most of the Association's clubs were in such severe financial difficulty that the Association waived the $25,000 affiliation fee for the season.
- Springvale played several night matches at Springvale Reserve during the 1994 season, including the season opening match against Prahran on Friday, 15 April. Springvale had previously hosted night matches as recently as 1978 while it was in the Federal Football League, but had never staged a night match during its time in the VFA.
- On Saturday, 7 May, Rino Pretto (Dandenong) kicked his 1000th career goal. Pretto was the second and, as of 2025, last player to reach the goalkicking milestone.
- On 4 June, Oakleigh led Werribee by 46 points at half time (14.9 (93) led 7.5 (47)), before Werribee recovered to win by 19 points: Werribee 21.16 (142) d. Oakleigh 18.15 (123).
- On 5 June, Coburg 15.9 (99) defeated Prahran 14.9 (93) to end a 30-match losing streak dating back to late 1992.

== See also ==
- List of VFA/VFL premiers
- Australian rules football
- Victorian Football League
