= 2003 VFL season =

122nd season of the Victorian Football League

- Teams: 13
- Premiers: Williamstown; 13th premiership
- Minor premiers: Port Melbourne; 16th minor premiership

The 2003 VFL season was the 122nd season of the Victorian Football League (VFL), a second-tier Australian rules football competition played in the states of Victoria and Tasmania.

Williamstown won the premiership for the 13th time, after defeating Box Hill by 29 points in the 2003 VFL Grand Final.

== League membership and affiliations ==
There were several changes to the VFL–AFL reserves affiliations prior to the 2003 season:

- Sydney, which had been partially affiliated with Port Melbourne, withdrew from having any connection with the VFL, instead electing to field a standalone reserves team in the AFL Canberra competition. Sydney broke off the affiliation with one year left on the contract, prompting a lawsuit from Port Melbourne.
- The Kangaroos, after spending the previous three years using the Murray Kangaroos as its VFL-affiliate, became affiliated with Port Melbourne. The Murray Kangaroos club, which had been a joint venture operation between the Kangaroos and the Ovens & Murray Football League, dropped out of the VFL and folded.
- Carlton, which had been fielding its reserves team in the VFL, became affiliated with the Northern Bullants. The Carlton reserves withdrew from the VFL.
- Essendon, which had been fielding its reserves team in the VFL, became affiliated with Bendigo. Under the affiliation, Bendigo adopted Essendon's black and red guernsey, and changed its nickname from Diggers to Bombers. The Essendon reserves withdrew from the VFL.

As a result of the changes, the VFL was reduced from sixteen teams to thirteen. Geelong was now the only one of the ten Victorian AFL clubs left fielding its own reserves team in the VFL, with nine clubs in VFL-AFL affiliations.

== Ladder ==
Pos	Team	Pld	W	L	D	PF	PA	PP	Pts	
1	Port Melbourne	18	14	3	1	1918	1439	133.3	58	Finals
2	Williamstown (P)	18	14	4	0	1856	1284	144.5	56	Finals
3	Box Hill	18	14	4	0	1789	1389	128.8	56	Finals
4	Sandringham	18	10	8	0	1623	1553	104.5	40	Finals
5	Tasmania	18	8	9	1	1708	1582	108.0	34	Finals
6	Springvale	18	8	9	1	1783	1702	104.8	34	Finals
7	Werribee	18	8	10	0	1656	1668	99.3	32	Finals
8	Geelong reserves	18	8	10	0	1623	1763	92.1	32	Finals
9	Frankston	18	8	10	0	1285	1420	90.5	32	
10	Bendigo	18	7	10	1	1519	1791	84.8	30	
11	Northern Bullants	18	6	12	0	1763	1824	96.7	24	
12	Coburg	18	6	12	0	1408	1896	74.3	24	
13	North Ballarat	18	4	14	0	1249	1869	66.8	16	

Rules for classification: 1) points; 2) percentage; 3) number of points for.
(P) Premiers

== Finals Series ==
Qualifying and elimination finals
August 30, North Port Oval
1	Port Melbourne	14.18 (102)
4	Sandringham	18.13 (121)
August 30, Bellerive Oval
5	Tasmania	18.10 (118)
8	Geelong	16.7 (103)
August 31, North Port Oval
6	Springvale	6.8 (44)
7	Werribee	21.18 (144)
August 30, Box Hill City Oval
2	Williamstown	16.14 (110)
3	Box Hill	8.(13 61)

Semi-finals
September 7, Bellerive Oval (crowd: 10,073)
Tasmania	14.21 (105)
Port Melbourne	17.14 (116)
September 6, North Port Oval
Box Hill	12.12 (84)
Werribee	12.11 (83)

Preliminary finals
September 13, North Port Oval
Sandringham	9.9 (63)
Box Hill	14.14 (98)
September 14, North Port Oval
Williamstown	17.11 (113)
Port Melbourne	15.16 (106)

Grand final
September 21, Optus Oval
Box Hill	9.9 (63)
Williamstown	13.14 (92)

=== Grand Final ===
2003 VFL Grand Final
Sunday 21 September (2:00 pm)	Box Hill	def. by	Williamstown	Optus Oval (crowd: 10,500)
1.1 (7); 2.4 (16); 8.6 (54); 9.9 (63)	Q1; Q2; Q3; Final	6.5 (41); 9.9 (63); 12.9 (81); 13.14 (92)	Norm Goss Memorial Medal: Adrian Fletcher (Williamstown)
Bayford 2, Kenna 2, Ball, Campbell, Harford, Johnson, Marguccio	Goals	Baldwin 4, Mahoney 2, Molloy 2, Cranage, McGouch, Smoker, Swan, Williams
M. Smith, for striking Maxwell in the fourth quarter	Reports

== Awards ==
- The Jim 'Frosty' Miller Medal was won for a record fifth consecutive year by Nick Sautner (Northern Bullants), who kicked 82 goals.
- The J. J. Liston Trophy was won by David Robbins (Sandringham), who polled 16 votes. It was Robbins' second Liston Trophy, having previously won the award in 2000. Robbins finished ahead of Stephen Jurica (North Ballarat), who finished second with 15 votes, and Jordan Doering (Tasmania) and Adrian Fletcher (Williamstown), who were equal third with 14 votes. Jeremy Clayton (Port Melbourne) polled the most votes with 20, but was ineligible to win the award due to suspension.
- The Fothergill–Round Medal was won by Aaron Davey (Port Melbourne).
- Williamstown won the reserves premiership. Williamstown 20.15 (135) defeated the Northern Bullants 12.11 (83) in the Grand Final, held as a curtain-raiser to the Seniors Grand Final on 21 September.
- Port Melbourne won the VFL Club Championship as the best-performing club across the senior and reserves competitions during the home-and-away season.

== Notable events ==
- The VFL granted a favourable fixture to the three stand-alone VFL clubs, Tasmania, North Ballarat and Frankston to try to assist them financially. The clubs were given extra home games (Tasmania had twelve home games for the year, and North Ballarat and Frankston had ten) and they were given extra Sunday matches to avoid clashes with the local competitions which were still mainly played on Saturdays.

== See also ==
- List of VFA/VFL premiers
- Australian rules football
- Victorian Football League
- Australian Football League
- 2003 AFL season
