= Brian Milnes =

Australian rules footballer

Personal information
- Full name: Brian Milnes
- Born: 12 March 1932 (age 94)
- Original team: Caulfield Grammar
- Height: 183 cm (6 ft 0 in)
- Weight: 81 kg (179 lb)

Playing career^{1}
Years	Club	Games (Goals)
1952–55	St Kilda	22 (3)
- ^{1} Playing statistics correct to the end of 1955.

Brian Milnes (born 12 March 1932) is a former Australian rules footballer who played with St Kilda in the Victorian Football League (VFL).

Milnes is the father-in-law of Mark Lisle and grandfather of Jordan Lisle.
