= 1955 VFA season =

1955 VFA premiership season
- Teams: 14
- Premiers: Williamstown; 7th premiership
- Minor premiers: Port Melbourne; 7th minor premiership

The 1955 Victorian Football Association season was the 74th season of the Australian rules football competition. The premiership was won by the Williamstown Football Club, after it recorded a come-from-behind nine-point victory against Port Melbourne in the Grand Final on 24 September. It was Williamstown's seventh premiership, its second in a row, and the second of five premierships won in six seasons from 1954 until 1959.

== Premiership ==
The home-and-home season was played over twenty matches, before the top four clubs contested a finals series under the Page–McIntyre system to determine the premiers for the season.

=== Ladder ===
1955 VFA ladder
Pos	Team	Pld	W	L	D	PF	PA	PP	Pts
1	Port Melbourne	20	17	2	1	2061	1442	142.9	70
2	Preston	20	17	3	0	1767	1235	143.1	68
3	Williamstown (P)	20	16	4	0	1789	1261	141.9	64
4	Moorabbin	20	14	6	0	1762	1348	130.7	56
5	Brunswick	20	11	8	1	1690	1407	120.1	46
6	Coburg	20	11	9	0	1745	1523	114.6	44
7	Box Hill	20	10	10	0	1461	1559	93.7	40
8	Prahran	20	9	11	0	1547	1663	93.0	36
9	Yarraville	20	9	11	0	1429	1623	88.0	36
10	Sandringham	20	8	12	0	1560	1888	82.6	32
11	Northcote	20	6	14	0	1245	1547	80.5	24
12	Oakleigh	20	5	15	0	1375	1668	82.4	20
13	Camberwell	20	5	15	0	1328	1736	76.5	20
14	Brighton	20	1	19	0	1040	1905	54.6	4

Rules for classification: 1) points; 2) percentage; 3) number of points for.
(P) Premiers

=== Finals ===
	Semifinals
Saturday, 3 September	Williamstown 12.12 (84)	def.	Moorabbin 10.9 (69)	St Kilda Cricket Ground (crowd: 11,000)
Saturday, 10 September	Port Melbourne 19.15 (129)	def.	Preston 8.13 (61)	St Kilda Cricket Ground (crowd: 16,000)

	Preliminary Final
Saturday, 17 September	Preston 10.13 (73)	def. by	Williamstown 11.16 (82)	St Kilda Cricket Ground (crowd: 16,000)

1955 VFA Grand Final
Saturday, 24 September	Port Melbourne	def. by	Williamstown	St Kilda Cricket Ground (crowd: 30,000)
7.3 (45); 8.6 (54); 12.8 (80); 13.10 (88)	Q1; Q2; Q3; Final	1.3 (9); 5.10 (40); 7.13 (55); 13.19 (97)	Umpires: Jack Irving
Bragg 4, Miller 3, Walsh 2, Bonnett, McBroom, Shannon, Stone	Goals	Linton 6, Smith 2, Callahan, Fisher, Gear, McPherson, Simpson
Storey (broken ankle), Tucker (cut eyebrow)	Injuries	Linton (head cuts)

== Awards ==
- The leading goalkicker for the home-and-home season was Jim Hewes (Coburg), who kicked 83 goals; the leading goalkicker after finals was Alby Linton (Williamstown), who was third behind Hewes and Peter Schofield (Moorabbin) with 73 goals in the home-and-home season, and kicked 84 goals overall.
- The J. J. Liston Trophy was won by Les Moroney (Moorabbin), who polled 37 votes. Lloyd Holyoak (Camberwell) was second with 35 votes, and Alby Linton (Williamstown) was third with 34 votes.
- Williamstown won the seconds premiership. Williamstown 10.10 (70) defeated Oakleigh 9.9 (63) in the Grand Final, played as a curtain raiser to the firsts Grand Final on 24 September.

== Notable events ==
- As had been the case since 1953, the players of the Northcote Football Club played as amateurs, due to the club's financial difficulties.
- Prior to the season, the Hakoah soccer club tendered an offer of £600 to the City of Camberwell for the use of the Camberwell Sports Ground on alternate weekends during the season, a move which would have left the Camberwell Football Club without a venue for its seconds team to use. The council eventually rejected the offer, deciding that in the long term the ground would be more profitable as a football venue than as a soccer venue.

== See also ==
- List of VFA/VFL Premiers
