= Damian Carroll =

Australian rules football coach

Personal information
- Full name: Damian Carroll
- Nickname: "DC"
- Born: 15 September 1972 (age 54)
- Position: Midfielder

Playing career
Years	Club	Games (Goals)
1992–2004	Springvale Football Club	233 (?)
2005–2008	Bonbeach	72 (?)

Coaching career^{3}
Years	Club	Games (W–L–D)
2009–2010	Gippsland Power	40 (23–17–0)
2010–2013	Box Hill Hawks	60 (33–27–0)
2013–2020	Hawthorn (assistant coach)	–
2021	Collingwood (assistant coach)	–
2022	St Kilda (assistant coach)	–
2014	Victoria	1 (0–1–0)
- ^{3} Coaching statistics correct as of 2014.

Career highlights
- 1990 VFL Team of the Decade; 1995, 1998, 1999 Springvale Premiership Player; 1996, 1997, 2003 Springvale Best and Fairest Runner Up; 2002 Springvale Best and Fairest; 2005 Bonbeach Best and Fairest; 5× VFL Team of the Year; VFL premiership coach: 2013

Damian Carroll (born 15 September 1972) is an Australian rules football coach who is the Head of Development and Learning at St Kilda Football Club. He was previously Collingwood Football Club's Head of Academy. He has also served as the head coach of Victorian Football League club Box Hill from 2011 to 2013, guiding the club to the VFL Premiership in his third season in charge, before going on to serve as an assistant coach with Hawthorn.

== Playing career ==
Carroll played as a midfielder for the Springvale Football Club, accruing 233 appearances. Prior to playing for Springvale, Carroll played for the Melbourne Football Club's under 19 team and St Kilda's reserves team. During his playing career he won three VFL premierships with Springvale, won Springvale's best and fairest award in 2002, featured in the 1990 VFL Team of the Decade and featured in the VFL Team of the Year 5 times. With 233 appearances to his name, he is Springvale's all-time leader in appearances.

Carroll spent the final four years of his playing career with Bonbeach, serving as Player-coach of the club and retiring as a player in 2008. He won the clubs Best and Fairest award in 2005.

== Coaching career ==
For the final four years of his playing career, Carroll served as Player-coach of Bonbeach. Shortly after retiring from football as a player, Carroll became the new coach of TAC Cup team Gippsland Power. In just his second year as coach of Gippsland, Carroll guided the Power to the TAC Cup Grand Final in 2010, losing to Calder Cannons 116–58.

In October 2010, Carroll was appointed the new head coach of Box Hill, replacing Brendon Bolton, who left after being appointed as an assistant coach with Hawthorn. Carroll's first season as Box Hill's coach was marked with inconsistency, with the Hawks winning 7 games and losing 10 to finish in 8th place on the VFL ladder, narrowly qualifying for the VFL Finals, where the Hawks were defeated by Werribee 89–63 in the first week of the finals.

The Hawks had another inconsistent season in 2012, but it was an improvement from their previous year, with the Hawks finishing 7 on the ladder with a 9–9 win–loss record, qualifying for the VFL Finals for the fourth successive season. They defeated Sandringham 118–88 in the first week of finals, before losing to eventual premiers Geelong 76–62 in the semi-finals.

The Hawks enjoyed their best season under Carroll in 2013, with the Hawks finishing 2nd on the VFL Ladder, with a 13–5 win–loss record. This was the Hawks' highest ladder finish under Carroll and their best win–loss record under Carroll. After defeating Williamstown 86–56 in the qualifying final and defeating Werribee 144–92 in the preliminary final, the Hawks made it to the VFL Grand Final, where they faced reigning premiers Geelong. Despite going into the match as underdogs, the Hawks defeated the Cats 99–78 to achieve just their second VFL premiership, and their first since 2001, in front of a crowd of 15,119 people at Etihad Stadium.

As a result of this achievement, Carroll was appointed Head Coach of Australian Football League club Hawthorn's Development Academy. in October 2013. He was succeeded as Box Hill senior coach by Northern Knights coach Marco Bello. In his three seasons in charge of the Hawks, Carroll coached the Hawks in 60 matches including finals, achieving 33 wins and 27 losses for a winning percentage of 55%.

In 2014, Carroll coached the Victorian VFL team in an interstate-league match against the South Australian SANFL team. Victoria lost the match 118–96 at North Port Oval.

After Brendon Bolton departed to Carlton, Carroll filled an interim assistant coaching role in the latter stages of 2015, taking over as Hawthorn's forward line coach. On 20 October 2015, Carroll was promoted to a full-time assistant coaching role. After spending a year as the Hawks' midfield coach, Carroll served as head of coaching, before being appointed as head of development & learning in 2018. Carroll left Hawthorn in September 2020.

On 31 October 2020, Carroll was appointed Head of Academy by the Collingwood Football Club; in this role, Carroll will be responsible for overseeing the club’s development programs.

After just one season at Collingwood, Carrol joined the St Kilda Football Club ahead of its 2022 season, as its Head of Development and Learning.

== Personal life ==
Carroll attended secondary school at St Bede's College Mentone and later taught at Marist-Sion College in Warragul before serving as Physical Education Teacher and Director of Sport at Mazenod College. His wife Kellie is a primary school teacher. The couple have 2 children.

Carroll belonged to a sporting family – Carroll's three brothers Brendan, John and Paul all played seniors or reserves for Springvale, his father, Brian, played 10 VFL/AFL games for Fitzroy in 1963 and Carroll's sister, Jayne, was also a keen sportswoman and avid Scorpions fan. John played just 4 seasons in the VFL, making the league's team of the year on each occasion, before retiring prematurely due to a debilitating back injury after moving to South Australian club Woodville-West Torrens. He was a listed Melbourne player for seasons 1994 & 1995. He won the Melbourne Reserves Best and Fairest in season 1994.
