= Eade =

Eade is an English surname. Notable people with this surname include:

- Alexandra Eade (born 1998), Australian artistic gymnast
- Allen Eade (born 1960), Australian footballer
- Charles Eade (1903−1964), British newspaper editor
- Cliff Eade (1933–2017), Australian footballer
- David Eade (born 1988), New Zealand rower
- Dominique Eade (born 1958), American jazz musician
- George J. Eade (1921−2018), American general
- James Eade (born 1957), American chess player
- Kenneth Eade (born 1957), American attorney, activist and author
- Murray Eade, New Zealand rugby player and coach
- Peter Eade (1919–1979), English theatrical agent
- Rodney Eade (born 1958), Australian footballer
- Scott Eade (born 1992), New Zealand rugby player
- Wilfred Eade Agar (1882–1951), Anglo-Australian zoologist
