= Tessa James =

Australian actress (born 1991)

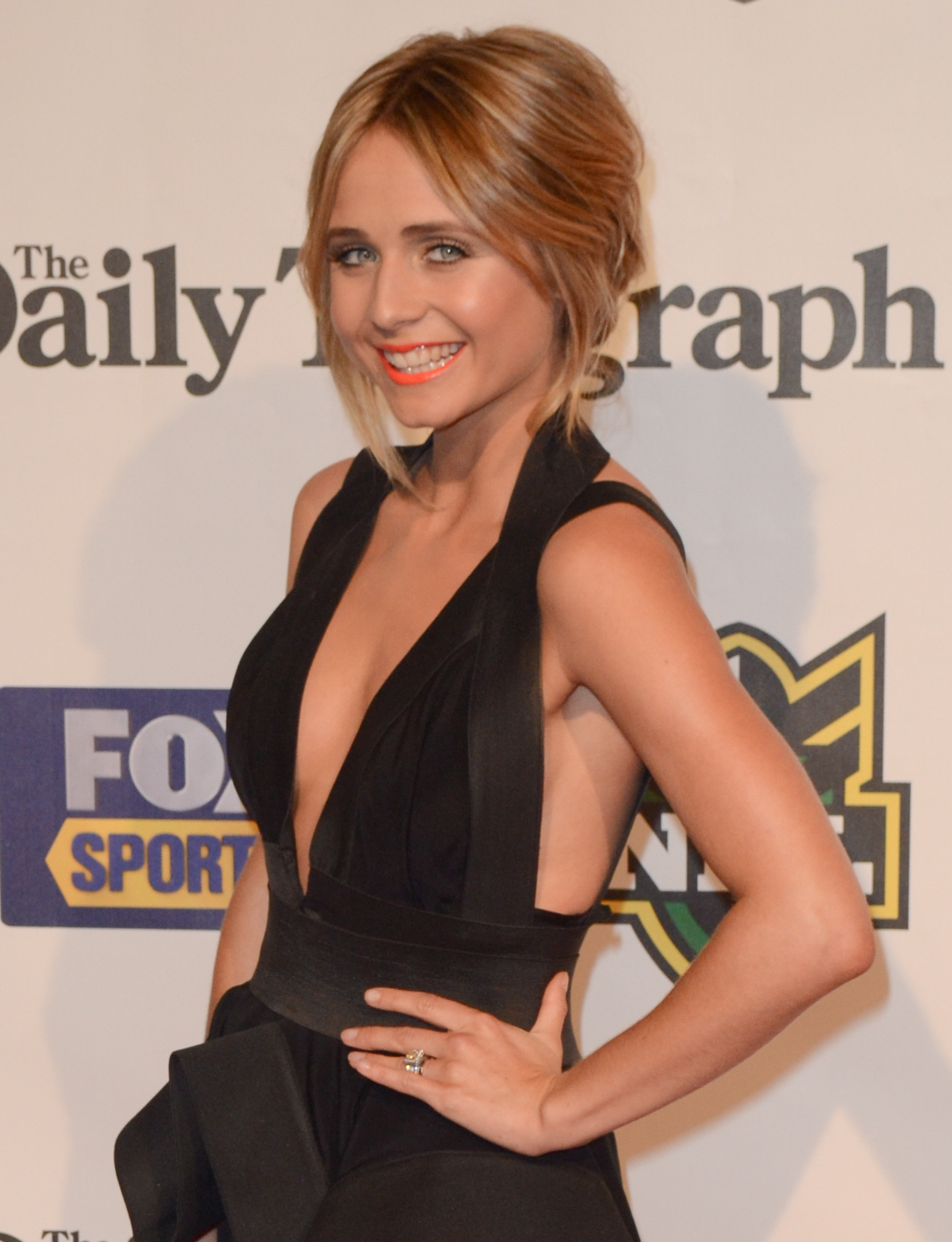
- James in September 2012
- Born: 17 April 1991 (age 35); Melbourne, Victoria, Australia
- Occupation: Actress
- Years active: 2006–present
- Spouse: Nate Myles (m. 2011)
- Children: 4
- Family: Stephen James (father)

Tessa James (born 17 April 1991) is an Australian actress. She made her acting debut as Anne Baxter in soap opera Neighbours in 2006. James played the role of Nicole Franklin in Home and Away from 2008 until 2011. She has also appeared in Beaconsfield and Love Child.

== Early life ==
James was born on 17 April 1991 in Melbourne. She is the daughter of former Richmond AFL player Stephen James.

== Career ==
Her first television role was playing Anne Baxter in the soap opera Neighbours. She also played the lead role in the Australian short film Hugo.

James joined the cast of Home and Away as Nicole Franklin in 2008. James enjoyed playing Nicole because she was "feisty and fun" and they did not have much in common, beyond a love for fashion. In March 2011, James confirmed that she had left Home and Away, and had plans to audition for roles in Los Angeles. The following year, she appeared in the telefilm Beaconsfield, a dramatisation of the Beaconsfield Mine collapse.

In 2015, James made an appearance in television drama Love Child. She also filmed a small role in Australian feature film Spin Out, and appears in comedy film You're Gonna Miss Me. In 2017, James starred in a production of Nick Enright's Blackrock at the Seymour Centre.

James runs AKI Design, an interior design business, with her sister and mother. She is also an ambassador for the Witchery White Shirt Campaign, which raises money for Ovarian Cancer Research Foundation.

== Personal life ==
In December 2010, James became engaged to professional rugby league footballer Nate Myles. The pair wed on 23 December 2011. In August 2017, James confirmed she was expecting the couple's first child. In February 2018, James announced she had given birth by posting a photo to her Instagram account showing Myles pushing a pram. James and Myles have four children, and are based in Melbourne.

In 2014, James was diagnosed with Hodgkin's lymphoma. She returned to the Gold Coast, Queensland to be with her husband and to receive treatment. Her father was being treated for Non-Hodgkin's lymphoma at the same time. James is in remission.

== Filmography ==
Year	Title	Role	Notes
2006–2007	Neighbours	Anne Baxter	10 episodes
2008	Hugo	Celestine	Australian short film
2008–2011	Home and Away	Nicole Franklin	Main cast Nominated – Inside Soap Award for Best Bitch
2012	Beaconsfield	Lauren Kielmann	Supporting role
2015	Love Child	Gail	Guest role
2016	Spin Out	Kimba	
2017	You're Gonna Miss Me	Jennifer Montana	
2018	Harmony	Eve	
2018	The Rookie	Rey	Episode: "Pilot"
2023	We Were Tomorrow	Petra	Episodes: "Eden", "Salvation", "Cursed"
