= John Salvado =

Australian cricketer (born 1939)

Personal information
- Full name: John Frederick Salvado
- Born: 11 November 1939 (age 87); Melbourne, Australia
- Batting: Right-handed
- Bowling: Right-arm fast-medium
- Role: Bowler

Domestic team information
- Years: Team
- 1964: Victoria
- Source: Cricinfo, 5 December 2015

John Frederick Salvado (born 11 November 1939) is an Australian former cricketer. He played four first-class cricket matches for Victoria in 1964.

Salvado, from the district club Hawthorn East Melbourne, was called up on four occasions during the 1963–64 season to play for Victoria. He was a right-arm fast-medium pacer who could open the bowling. In his four Sheffield Shield matches he took 7 wickets at an average of 46.57.

Salvado also played Australian rules football. He was the leading goalkicker at Box Hill from 1959 to 1963. He later kicked more than 100 goals in a season on three occasions while playing for East Malvern in the Federal Football League during the late 1960s. He led the league's list with 105 in 1966, 105 in 1968, 102 in 1966 and 95 in 1971.
