= Matt Little (footballer) =

Australian rules footballer (born 1986)

Personal information
- Full name: Matthew Little
- Born: 3 January 1986 (age 40)
- Original team: Calder Cannons
- Height: 187 cm (6 ft 2 in)
- Weight: 74 kg (163 lb)
- Position: Forward

Playing career^{1}
Years	Club	Games (Goals)
2007	Hawthorn	1 (0)
- ^{1} Playing statistics correct to the end of 2007.

Matthew Little (born 3 January 1986) is an Australian rules footballer, who has previously played for the Hawthorn Football Club, in the Australian Football League (AFL). Little won the Frosty Miller Medal in 2010. Currently, Little plays for the Bendigo Bombers in the Victorian Football League (VFL).

After playing one senior game for Hawthorn, Little was delisted at the end of the 2007 season. During his three years with Hawthorn, Little played 40 games with the club's VFL affiliate the Box Hill Hawks and kicked 80 goals. He was the club's leading goalkicker in both 2006 and 2007 with 35 goals each season.

At the end of 2010, Little had kicked 258 career goals in the VFL, 178 with Williamstown and 80 with the Box Hill Hawks. He kicked 84 goals in the 2010 season.

He is the cousin of Brownlow Medallist and former Essendon Football Club coach, James Hird.
