= Doug Beasy =

Australian rules footballer and coach

Personal information
- Full name: Douglas Edward Beasy
- Born: 16 April 1930; Dunolly, Victoria
- Died: 12 May 2013 (aged 83); Mildura, Victoria
- Original team: Dunolly
- Debut: Round 1, 1951, Carlton vs. Hawthorn, at Princes Park
- Height: 178 cm (5 ft 10 in)
- Weight: 76 kg (168 lb)

Playing career^{1}
Years	Club	Games (Goals)
1951–1959	Carlton	129 (124)
- ^{1} Playing statistics correct to the end of 1959.

Douglas Edward Beasy (16 April 1930 – 12 May 2013) was an Australian rules footballer who played in the Victorian Football League (VFL).

Beasy was recruited from Dunolly, where he won the 1948 Maryborough & District Football League best and fairest award and later made his debut for the Carlton Football Club in the Round 1 of the 1951 season. He won Carlton's best and fairest award in 1956. He left the Blues at the end of the 1959 season.

He was captain-coach of Victorian Football Association (VFA) club Box Hill from 1960 to 1962, winning the J. J. Liston Trophy as best and fairest player in the VFA in 1961. In all he played 49 games and scored 41 goals for Box Hill.

He is the son of former Carlton player Maurie Beasy and the great-uncle of Hawthorn player Brendan Whitecross.

Outside of football, Beasy was a primary teacher and later a school principal. He was involved in Rotary, his church and the establishment of a men's shed in Mildura. He died on 12 May 2013 after a short illness.
