= Tassie Johnson =

Australian rules footballer and coach

- Johnson in 1964

Personal information
- Born: 2 December 1937
- Died: 29 October 2015 (aged 77)
- Original team: North Launceston
- Height: 189 cm (6 ft 2 in)
- Weight: 89 kg (196 lb)
- Position: Full-back

Playing career^{1}
Years	Club	Games (Goals)
1959–1969	Melbourne	202 (20)

Representative team honours
Years	Team	Games (Goals)
1960–1967	Victoria	12
- ^{1} Playing statistics correct to the end of 1969.

Career highlights
- 3× VFL premierships: 1959, 1960, 1964; Melbourne captain: 1970; Melbourne Team of the Century (full-back); Tasmanian Team of the Century (full-back); Melbourne Hall of Fame

Robert Edward "Tassie" Johnson (2 December 1937 – 29 October 2015) was an Australian rules footballer who played with Melbourne in the Victorian Football League (VFL) during the 1960s. He was known by his nickname Tassie as there were two other Johnsons at the club at the time he was recruited from North Launceston in Tasmania.

Johnson was a premiership player with Melbourne in 1959, 1960 and 1964. He captained the club during the 1969 season, but they finished in last place.

In 1971 he was captain-coach of Box Hill in the Victorian Football Association (VFA).

In 2004 he was named at full-back in both Melbourne and Tasmania's Team of the Century. In 2015, he died after a long illness.

== Statistics ==
Legend
G	Goals	K	Kicks	D	Disposals	T	Tackles
B	Behinds	H	Handballs	M	Marks	H/O	Hit-outs

Season	Team	No.	Games	Totals								Averages (per game)								Votes
Season	Team	No.	Games	G	B	K	H	D	M	T	H/O	G	B	K	H	D	M	T	H/O	Votes
1959^{#}	Melbourne	8	20	0	—N/a	—N/a	—N/a	—N/a	—N/a	—N/a	—N/a	0.0	—N/a	—N/a	—N/a	—N/a	—N/a	—N/a	—N/a	1
1960^{#}	Melbourne	8	19	0	—N/a	—N/a	—N/a	—N/a	—N/a	—N/a	—N/a	0.0	—N/a	—N/a	—N/a	—N/a	—N/a	—N/a	—N/a	0
1961	Melbourne	8	20	0	—N/a	—N/a	—N/a	—N/a	—N/a	—N/a	—N/a	0.0	—N/a	—N/a	—N/a	—N/a	—N/a	—N/a	—N/a	6
1962	Melbourne	8	18	6	—N/a	—N/a	—N/a	—N/a	—N/a	—N/a	—N/a	0.3	—N/a	—N/a	—N/a	—N/a	—N/a	—N/a	—N/a	3
1963	Melbourne	8	19	5	—N/a	—N/a	—N/a	—N/a	—N/a	—N/a	—N/a	0.3	—N/a	—N/a	—N/a	—N/a	—N/a	—N/a	—N/a	7
1964^{#}	Melbourne	8	19	2	—N/a	—N/a	—N/a	—N/a	—N/a	—N/a	—N/a	0.1	—N/a	—N/a	—N/a	—N/a	—N/a	—N/a	—N/a	3
1965	Melbourne	8	17	1	0	156	22	178	49	—N/a	—N/a	0.1	0.0	9.2	1.3	10.5	2.9	—N/a	—N/a	1
1966	Melbourne	8	18	2	1	239	55	294	59	—N/a	198	0.1	0.1	13.3	3.1	16.3	3.3	—N/a	11.6	2
1967	Melbourne	8	17	1	2	136	25	161	52	—N/a	11	0.1	0.1	8.0	1.5	9.5	3.1	—N/a	0.6	5
1968	Melbourne	8	19	1	1	180	22	202	62	—N/a	1	0.1	0.1	9.5	1.2	10.6	3.3	—N/a	0.1	8
1969	Melbourne	8	16	2	1	183	43	226	39	—N/a	61	0.1	0.1	11.4	2.7	14.1	2.4	—N/a	3.8	6
Career			202	20	5	894	167	1061	261	—N/a	271	0.1	0.1	10.3	1.9	12.2	3.0	—N/a	4.0	42
