= Alex Gardiner Sr. =

Australian rules footballer

Alex Gardiner

Personal information
- Full name: Alexander Craig Gardiner
- Born: 28 June 1900; Gisborne, Victoria
- Died: 4 August 1972 (aged 72); Gisborne, Victoria
- Original team: Gisborne
- Height: 175 cm (5 ft 9 in)
- Weight: 73 kg (161 lb)
- Position: Wing

Playing career^{1}
Years	Club	Games (Goals)
1925–1926	Footscray	23 (0)
- ^{1} Playing statistics correct to the end of 1926.

Alexander Craig Gardiner (28 June 1900 – 4 August 1972) was an Australian rules footballer who played for the Footscray Football Club in the Victorian Football League (VFL). His son, also called Alex, also played for Footscray.
