= Shane Molloy =

Australian rules footballer and coach

Personal information
- Full name: Shane Molloy
- Born: 21 June 1949 (age 77)
- Original team: Macleod-Rosanna
- Height: 179 cm (5 ft 10 in)
- Weight: 81 kg (179 lb)
- Position: Defender

Playing career^{1}
| Years | Club | Games (Goals) |
| 1969, 1971–74 | Fitzroy | 61 (4) |
- ^{1} Playing statistics correct to the end of 1974.

Shane Molloy (born 21 June 1949) is a former Australian rules footballer who played with Fitzroy in the Victorian Football League (VFL).

Molloy, recruited from Macleod-Rosanna, was a back pocket player. He made his Fitzroy debut at Princes Park, in a loss to Footscray, who were celebrating Ted Whitten's 300th game. The defender made four further appearances that year and spent the entire 1970 season in the reserves, but had the distinction of kicking the first ever goal at Waverley Park. He was a regular in the Fitzroy team in 1971 and 1972, missing just three games.

The father of Jarrod Molloy, he played at VFA club Port Melbourne after leaving Fitzroy. He captain-coached Montmorency to a Diamond Valley Football League premiership in 1979.

Molloy returned to the VFA in 1991 as coach of Box Hill and became person to steer the club to two successive finals series. He coached Port Melbourne in the 1995 VFA season.
