= Maurie Beasy =

Australian rules footballer

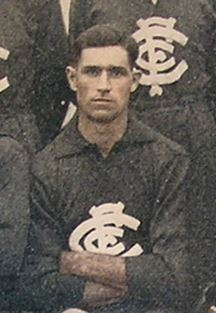
- Beasy in 1928

Personal information
- Full name: Maurice Beasy
- Born: 14 March 1896; Dunolly, Victoria
- Died: 28 April 1979 (aged 83); Mildura, Victoria
- Original team: Dunolly
- Height: 185 cm (6 ft 1 in)
- Weight: 87 kg (192 lb)

Playing career^{1}
Years	Club	Games (Goals)
1920–28	Carlton	75 (11)
- ^{1} Playing statistics correct to the end of 1928.

Maurie Beasy (14 March 1896 – 28 April 1979) was an Australian rules footballer who played with Carlton in the Victorian Football League.

He was the father of the Carlton footballer Doug Beasy.
