= Richard Murrie =

Australian rules footballer

Personal information
- Full name: Richard Murrie
- Born: 25 June 1955 (age 71)
- Height: 189 cm (6 ft 2 in)
- Weight: 89 kg (196 lb)
- Position: Defender

Playing career^{1}
Years	Club	Games (Goals)
1975–79	Footscray	68 (10)
1980–82	Geelong	35 (3)
1983	Richmond	8 (0)
Total		111 (13)
- ^{1} Playing statistics correct to the end of 1983.

Richard Murrie (born 25 June 1955) is a former Australian rules footballer who played for Footscray, Geelong and Richmond in the Victorian Football League (VFL).

A defender from South Australia where he played for Sturt, Murrie was a regular fixture in the Footscray team of the late 1970s before crossing to Geelong. His only finals appearances came while at Geelong in 1981 and included a preliminary final loss.

Murrie had a brief stint with Richmond and then began playing for Box Hill in the VFA. He was the captain-coach and centre half back in Box Hill's 1986 division two premiership team.
