= Alex Gardiner =

Australian rules footballer (born 1935)

Personal information
- Full name: Alex Gardiner
- Born: 3 January 1935
- Original team: Gisborne
- Height: 175 cm (5 ft 9 in)
- Weight: 73 kg (161 lb)
- Position: Wingman

Playing career^{1}
Years	Club	Games (Goals)
1955–56, 1958–62	Footscray	92 (18)
1963-1967	Box Hill	55 (58)
Total		147 (76)
- ^{1} Playing statistics correct to the end of 1962.

Alec Gardiner (born 3 January 1935) was an Australian rules footballer who played with Footscray in the Victorian Football League (VFL). His father, also named Alec was a Footscray player during the 1920s.

Gardiner, originally from Gisborne, was one of Footscray's wingers in the 1961 VFL Grand Final loss to Hawthorn. From 1963 to 1967, Gardiner was captain-coach of Box Hill in the Victorian Football Association (VFA). He always polled well in the Field Trophy, finishing as the runner-up in 1964. In all, Gardiner played a total of 73 games for Box Hill, mainly as a centreman, and scored 61 goals. In 2000 he was selected on the wing in Box Hill's "Greatest Ever Team" and named as captain.
