= Mark Turner (Australian footballer) =

Australian rules footballer

Personal information
- Born: 14 April 1960 (age 66)
- Original team: St Leo's College
- Height: 188 cm (6 ft 2 in)
- Weight: 81 kg (179 lb)

Playing career^{1}
Years	Club	Games (Goals)
1979–1983	Hawthorn	35 (6)
- ^{1} Playing statistics correct to the end of 1983.

Mark Turner (born 14 April 1960) is a former Australian rules footballer who played with Hawthorn in the Victorian Football League (VFL).

Turner, a recruit from St Leo's College, made 35 appearances for Hawthorn, between 1979 and 1983. He then played in the Victorian Football Association (VFA), first at Camberwell, followed by a stint with Box Hill. In the 1986 VFA Second Division Grand Final, Turner was on a half back flank for Box Hill, in an 18-point win over Sunshine, to claim the premiership. He was playing coach of the Wodonga Raiders from 1989 to 1992, the club's first four seasons in the Ovens & Murray Football League.
