= Callum Porter =

Australian rules footballer (born 1999)

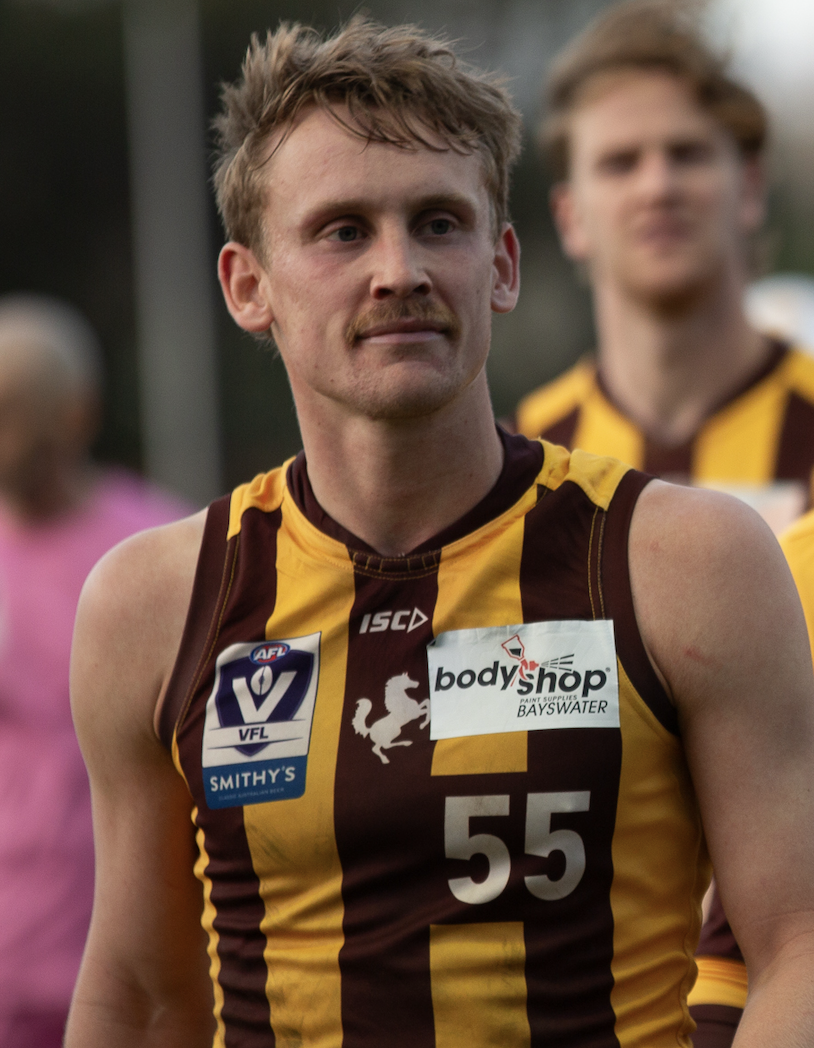
- Porter with Box Hill in 2024

Personal information
- Full name: Callum Porter
- Born: 22 February 1999 (age 27); Melbourne, Victoria
- Original team: Gippsland Power
- Draft: No. 74, 2017 AFL draft, Western Bulldogs
- Debut: 23 July 2020, Western Bulldogs vs. Gold Coast, at Metricon Stadium
- Height: 182 cm (6 ft 0 in)
- Weight: 76 kg (168 lb)
- Position: Midfielder

Playing career^{1}
Years	Club	Games (Goals)
2017	Western Bulldogs	1 (0)
2017	Casey (VFL)	1
2018–2020	Footscray (VFL)	33
2021–	Box Hill (VFL)	77 (22)
- ^{1} Playing statistics correct to the end of 2025 season.

Callum Porter (born 22 February 1999) is an Australian rules footballer who most recently served as the captain of the Box Hill Hawks in the Victorian Football League (VFL). He previously played professionally for the Western Bulldogs in the Australian Football League (AFL) after being recruited with the 74th draft pick in the 2017 draft.

== Career ==
=== Early career ===
Porter began his career at the Officer Kangaroos in the South East Juniors competition. He played for the Gippsland Power for 2 seasons in 2016 and 2017. He served as vice-captain and claimed the club's best-and-fairest medal in 2017, and finished seventh in the best-and-fairest count for the TAC Cup that year. He also played one game for the Casey Demons during the 2017 VFL season.

=== AFL ===
Porter made his AFL debut in the Western Bulldogs' close win against the Gold Coast Suns in the eighth round of the 2020 AFL season. Porter had 9 disposals and laid 4 tackles in his first game. However, Porter suffered a minor shoulder injury and was taken out of the team for the next round.

Porter was delisted by the Western Bulldogs at the conclusion of the 2020 AFL season, after just one AFL game over his three years at the club.

=== VFL ===
After being delisted, Porter joined the Box Hill Hawks in the VFL. He made his debut for the Hawks in round 1 of the 2021 VFL season against Casey, and played a total of seven games that season.

In 2022, he played 19 games, including a career-best 45 disposals in round 18 against the Northern Bullants. He won the club's best-and-fairest medal, the Col Austen Trophy.

In 2023, Porter was appointed co-captain of the Hawks, serving alongside Hugh Beasley. After Beasley retired at the end of the 2023 season, Porter was appointed sole captain for the 2024. He left Box Hill following the 2025 season.

== Statistics ==
=== AFL ===
Statistics are correct to the 2020 season

Legend
G	Goals	K	Kicks	D	Disposals	T	Tackles
B	Behinds	H	Handballs	M	Marks

Season	Team	No.	Games	Totals							Averages (per game)						
Season	Team	No.	Games	G	B	K	H	D	M	T	G	B	K	H	D	M	T
2018	Western Bulldogs	28	0	—	—	—	—	—	—	—	—	—	—	—	—	—	—
2019	Western Bulldogs	28	0	—	—	—	—	—	—	—	—	—	—	—	—	—	—
2020 (Note: The 2020 season was played with 17 home-and-away matches per team (down from 22) and 16-minute quarters with time on (down from 20-minute quarters with time on) due to the impact of the COVID-19 pandemic.)	Western Bulldogs	28	1	0	0	4	5	9	0	4	0.0	0.0	4.0	5.0	9.0	0.0	4.0
Career			1	0	0	4	5	9	0	4	0.0	0.0	4.0	5.0	9.0	0.0	4.0
