= Geoff Bryant =

Australian rules footballer and coach

Personal information
- Born: 22 July 1946 (age 80); Richmond, Victoria
- Original team: Box Hill (VFA)

Playing career^{1}
Years	Club	Games (Goals)
1969–1971	North Melbourne	45 (16)
- ^{1} Playing statistics correct to the end of 1971.

Geoff Bryant (born 22 July 1946 in Richmond, Victoria) is a former Australian rules football player who played in the VFL between 1969 and 1971 for the North Melbourne Football Club.

Bryant commenced his junior football with VFA club Box Hill, playing in the club's 4ths (Under 17s) team in 1960, thereafter progressing quickly through the club's junior ranks. In 1964, he won the Gomez Medal as the best and fairest in the VFA second division Thirds, and he made his senior debut for the club at the age of 17 in the same year.

Bryant quickly established himself as one of the premier players in the VFA second division, initially as a half-forward but later as a centreman with outstanding foot skills and stamina. In 1968 he won Box Hill's best and fairest and finished runner-up in the J Field Medal, awarded to the best player in the VFA second division. At the end of the 1968 season Bryant was one of the few non-VFL players selected in the second touring party for Australian Football World Tour organised by Harry Beitzel, more commonly known as "The Galahs". Bryant played in five of the seven Internationals and was regarded as the "find" of the tour, attracting the attention of VFL talent scouts.

Following the 1968 season, he was signed by the North Melbourne Football Club in a highly controversial transfer. A transfer fee of $2,000 was set for Bryant's clearance under a rule which the VFA had introduced in 1967, but VFL clubs were forbidden from paying any sort of transfer fee under the VFL's player payment rules – which had been the source of open dispute between the competitions over the previous two years. The VFA formally approved Bryant's clearance, and it initially appeared that it had done so without the transfer fee being paid; but VFA secretary Fred Hill then reported to the press that North Melbourne had indeed secretly paid the transfer fee in defiance of the VFL's rules. Box Hill president Reg Shineberg claimed likewise, and reported to have received the fee clandestinely – in cash, under cover of darkness, and from a man he did not know. North Melbourne was required to face the VFL arbitrators over the affair, but charges against the club were dropped when Hill did not provide any written corroborating evidence; so whether or not the illegal transfer fee was actually paid was never proven. Subsequently, the Box Hill Football Club's 1969 Annual Report declared in its financial accounts that a payment of $2,000 was received from "The Northerners" which provided indirect but corroborating evidence that a payment had been received.

Bryant played between 1969 and 1971 for North Melbourne mainly as a wingman for a total of 45 games and 16 goals. In his first season he won the Best First Year Player Trophy and in his second year he finished fifth in North Melbourne's Best and fairest. He missed a significant portion of the 1971 season due to injury and his form dropped away accordingly. He transferred back to Box Hill prior to the commencement of the 1972 season, supposedly due to a disagreement with North Melbourne's coach Brian Dixon.

Bryant played a further five seasons with Box Hill from 1972 to 1976 and during that period was regarded as one of the very best players in the VFA. He won the J Field Medal in both 1973 and 1975 and his 2nd and 3rd best and fairest awards for Box Hill in the same years. His feat in winning the J Field Medal in 1973 was regarding as an outstanding one; it was achieved for a team that failed to win a game for the entire season. At the end of the season he was described as "unquestionably the champion player in the VFA – first and second division". He was captain of Box Hill from 1974 to 1976 and was also coach in 1975.

Bryant's final tally for Box Hill was 147 senior games and 195 goals. Shortly before his retirement in 1976 he was widely acknowledged for passing the rare milestone of 150 senior games of VFA football. The discrepancy is due to the practice at the time of including matches played in the end-of-season VFA "Lightning Premiership" in a player's overall games tally, which are no longer recognised as official VFA matches. Bryant played 11 in Lightning Premiership matches for Box Hill in addition to his matches for Premiership points. He also represented the VFA on two occasions.

Ironically for such a decorated player, Bryant generally was a member of teams that struggled and he never played in a finals match with either Box Hill or North Melbourne. In 2000 he was named as centreman of Box Hill's official "Greatest Ever Team". In 2022 he was one of the inaugural inductees into the Box Hill Hawks Football Club Hall of Fame.
