= Eric Moore (footballer, born 1948) =

Australian rules footballer and coach

Personal information
- Born: 29 April 1948 (age 78); Coleraine, Victoria
- Original team: Coleraine (WBFL)

Playing career^{1}
Years	Club	Games (Goals)
1966–1972	Richmond	80 (94)
1972–1973	South Melbourne	18 (28)
1974–1975	Oakleigh	21 (82)
1976-1978	Caulfield	23 (73)
1982-1983	Box Hill	23 (73)
Total		165 (340)
- ^{1} Playing statistics correct to the end of 1973.

Career highlights
- Richmond premiership player: 1969

Eric Moore (born 29 April 1948 in Coleraine, Victoria) is a former Australian rules football player who played in the VFL between 1966 and 1972 for the Richmond Football Club and for South Melbourne in 1972 and 1973.

After several years of being unable to claim a regular place in Richmond's team, Moore was tried at full-forward in 1969 and achieved his career highlight by scoring 2 goals and playing a key role in Richmond's grand final victory by 25 points over Carlton.

After retiring from VFL football at the end of the 1973 season, Moore played in the VFA between 1974 and 1976 with both Oakleigh and Caulfield. Chronic hamstring injuries forced his retirement at the end of the 1976 season at 28 years of age.

In 1982 Moore was appointed coach of VFA club Box Hill. Box Hill had won only 18 games in the 9 seasons from 1973 to 1981, but Moore immediately lifted Box Hill to 5th place (10 wins) in 1982 and again to 5th place (11½ wins) in 1983 before Box Hill claimed its first ever VFA premiership in 1984 (its 34th season in the VFA), overwhelming Moore's former club Oakleigh in the grand final 32.23(215) to 11.14(80). Moore's final season coaching Box Hill was in 1985, the club's first season in the VFA first division since 1960. Moore played intermittently for Box Hill in 1982 and 1983 for a total of 12 games and 41 goals for that club.

In 2000 Moore was named as coach of Box Hill's official "Greatest Ever Team".
