= Peter Pettigrew =

Australian rules footballer

Personal information
- Full name: Peter Pettigrew
- Born: 9 September 1950 (age 76)
- Original team: East Reservoir
- Height: 177 cm (5 ft 10 in)
- Weight: 72.5 kg (160 lb)

Playing career^{1}
Years	Club	Games (Goals)
1970–72	Collingwood	19 (5)
- ^{1} Playing statistics correct to the end of 1972.

Peter Pettigrew (born 9 September 1950) is a former Australian rules footballer who played with Collingwood in the Victorian Football League (VFL).
