= Alby Linton =

Australian rules footballer

Personal information
- Full name: Albert Charles Linton
- Born: 18 November 1926
- Died: 11 April 2010 (aged 83)
- Original team: Spotswood
- Height: 170 cm (5 ft 7 in)
- Weight: 70 kg (154 lb)

Playing career^{1}
Years	Club	Games (Goals)
1947–1952	Footscray	53 (46)
1953–1956	Williamstown	87 (226)
- ^{1} Playing statistics correct to the end of 1952.

Albert Charles Linton (18 November 1926 – 11 April 2010) was an Australian rules footballer who played for Footscray in the Victorian Football League (VFL) and Williamstown in the Victorian Football Association (VFA).

As an 18-year-old, Linton enlisted to serve towards the end of World War II but did not see active service. A rover, Linton was recruited from Footscray locally and made his debut in 1947. He played 53 games for the club and was their equal top goalkicker in 1951 with 23 goals.

In 1953 he left Footscray and joined Williamstown in the VFA, becoming a member of three premiership teams during the 1950s. He was an unusually prolific goalkicker for a player whose primary position was as a rover, and he topped the league's goalkicking in 1955 with 84 goals. Linton was the 1955 club best and fairest, and played a total of 87 games and kicked 226 goals across his four-year career with Williamstown.

Linton is the rover in Williamstown's official 'Team of the Century', and in 2014 was an inaugural inductee in the club's hall of fame.
