= Colin Love (footballer) =

Australian rules footballer

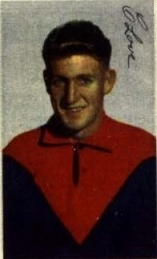

Personal information
- Full name: Colin Love
- Born: 9 June 1929
- Died: 12 January 1998 (aged 68)
- Original team: Healesville
- Height: 183 cm (6 ft 0 in)
- Weight: 82 kg (181 lb)

Playing career^{1}
Years	Club	Games (Goals)
1949–52	Melbourne	16 (13)
- ^{1} Playing statistics correct to the end of 1952.

Colin Love (9 June 1929 – 12 January 1998) was an Australian rules footballer who played with Melbourne in the Victorian Football League (VFL).
