= Stephen Kenna =

Australian rules footballer

Personal information
- Full name: Stephen Kenna
- Born: 8 October 1981 (age 45); Hamilton
- Original team: Morningside / Mount Gravatt / Box Hill
- Draft: 75th overall, 2003 National draft
- Height: 170 cm (5 ft 7 in)
- Weight: 69 kg (152 lb)
- Position: Forward

Playing career^{1}
Years	Club	Games (Goals)
2000	Brisbane Lions	0 (0)
2004	Carlton	5 (3)
- ^{1} Playing statistics correct to the end of 2004.

Stephen Kenna (born 8 October 1981) is a former Australian rules footballer who played with Carlton in the Australian Football League (AFL). After being delisted from Carlton, Kenna moved to South Adelaide in the South Australian National Football League (SANFL). He played 48 games for South Adelaide, coming second in the 2006 Magarey Medal and representing the SANFL twice, before returning to Melbourne midway through 2007. Once back in Melbourne, Kenna played for Box Hill in the Victorian Football League (VFL), whom he had played for before being drafted by Carlton. He won the club's best and fairest in 2008 and was captain of the club in 2009 and 2010. Kenna is now a Primary School Teacher.

== Sources ==
- Holmesby, Russell & Main, Jim (2009). The Encyclopedia of AFL Footballers. 8th ed. Melbourne: Bas Publishing.
- Stephen Kenna's playing statistics from AFL Tables
