= Tim Livingstone =

Australian rules footballer (born 1967)

Personal information
- Full name: Tim Livingstone
- Born: 21 September 1967 (age 59)
- Original team: Box Hill
- Height: 183 cm (6 ft 0 in)
- Weight: 79 kg (174 lb)

Playing career^{1}
Years	Club	Games (Goals)
1992–1993	Richmond	8 (1)
- ^{1} Playing statistics correct to the end of 1993.

Tim Livingstone (born 21 September 1967) is a former Australian rules footballer who played with Richmond in the Australian Football League (AFL).

== Playing career ==
Livingstone made two appearances in the 1992 AFL season, late in the year, and played a further six senior games in 1993, also towards the end of the season.

He also played football for North Ringwood and Box Hill. In 1995 he won the Frank Johnson Medal for his performance with the VFL's representative team.

== Post-AFL career ==
Livingstone is currently the Head of Player and Coach Development at Richmond.
