= Peter Bourke (footballer, born 1966) =

Australian rules footballer

Personal information
- Born: 23 May 1966 (age 60)
- Original team: Mitcham
- Draft: No. 31, 1989 pre-season draft
- Height: 173 cm (5 ft 8 in)
- Weight: 76 kg (168 lb)

Playing career^{1}
Years	Club	Games (Goals)
1988	Essendon	1 (0)
1989–1991	Fitzroy	22 (3)
Total		23 (3)
- ^{1} Playing statistics correct to the end of 1991.

Peter Bourke (born 23 May 1966) is a former Australian rules footballer who played with Essendon and Fitzroy in the Victorian Football League (VFL).

Bourke, who played his early football at Mitcham, spent some time at Richmond but was unable to secure senior selection. He was playing for Box Hill when was signed by Essendon and he made his VFL debut late in the 1988 season, against Collingwood.

Fitzroy, a club Bourke had trialled with prior to joining Essendon, selected him in the 1989 Pre-season Draft. He played 13 games for Fitzroy in 1989, five in 1990 and four in 1991.

In 1994, Bourke represented Box Hill in the VFA Grand Final against Sandringham, which they lost by nine points.
