= Trevor Dawson (footballer) =

Australian rules footballer

Personal information
- Full name: Trevor Dawson
- Born: 21 January 1948 (age 78)
- Original team: Northcote High
- Height: 173 cm (5 ft 8 in)
- Weight: 74 kg (163 lb)

Playing career^{1}
Years	Club	Games (Goals)
1966, 1968	Fitzroy	9 (6)
- ^{1} Playing statistics correct to the end of 1968.

Trevor Dawson (born 21 January 1948) is a former Australian rules footballer who played with Fitzroy in the Victorian Football League (VFL).
