= Jordan Lisle =

Australian rules footballer

Personal information
- Born: 12 July 1990 (age 36)
- Original team: Oakleigh Chargers
- Draft: No. 50, 2008 national draft
- Debut: Round 11, 2011, Hawthorn vs. Fremantle, at Melbourne Cricket Ground
- Height: 196 cm (6 ft 5 in)
- Weight: 98 kg (216 lb)

Playing career^{1}
Years	Club	Games (Goals)
2009–2011	Hawthorn	5 (1)
2012–2014	Brisbane Lions	18 (15)
Total		23 (16)
- ^{1} Playing statistics correct to the end of 2014.

Career highlights
- 2x NEAFL premiership player: 2012, 2013; VFL premiership player: 2017; 3× Jim 'Frosty' Miller Medal: 2015, 2017, 2019; Under–18 All-Australian team: 2008

Jordan Lisle (born 12 July 1990) is a former Australian rules football player who played with Hawthorn Football Club and the Brisbane Lions in the Australian Football League, and with the Port Melbourne Football Club in the Victorian Football League

== Drafted ==
A strong-marking forward who had the ability to play as a back, Lisle was described as a competitive and courageous player who had a solid skill level. He was a Vic Metro under-18 representative in 2008, culminating in selection in the All-Australian under-18 team.

== AFL career ==
=== 2011: Debut ===
He made his debut for the Hawks in Round 11 of the 2011 AFL season against Fremantle. Lisle was a late inclusion after star forward Lance Franklin withdrew because of a calf injury. He kicked his first AFL goal in Round 24 against Gold Coast. On 17 October, Lisle was traded to the Brisbane Lions.

=== Brisbane ===
Relocating to Brisbane in 2012, Lisle continued his development as a key forward with the Reserves in the State League competition. He played in the final five matches of the season for the seniors. Lisle was eligible to return to the Reserves side in time to help them claim the 2012 NEAFL Premiership. He kicked 5 goals against the NT Thunder in the Grand Final, the following week he kicked eight goals in the Inter-Conference Championship win.

=== Post-AFL ===
After being delisted, Lisle signed with Port Melbourne in the Victorian Football League. He played at the Borough between 2015 and 2019 (while also being signed there during the abandoned 2020 season), led the club in goalkicking each year, and won the Frosty Miller Medal as VFL leading goalkicker in the home-and-away season on three occasions: jointly in 2015 (42 goals), and outright in 2017 (46 goals) and 2019 (40 goals).

== Family ==
Jordan is the son of former North Melbourne ruckman Mark Lisle.

== Statistics ==
Legend
G	Goals	K	Kicks	D	Disposals	T	Tackles
B	Behinds	H	Handballs	M	Marks

Season	Team	No.	Games	Totals							Averages (per game)							Votes
Season	Team	No.	Games	G	B	K	H	D	M	T	G	B	K	H	D	M	T	Votes
2009	Hawthorn	36	0	—	—	—	—	—	—	—	—	—	—	—	—	—	—	0
2010	Hawthorn	36	0	—	—	—	—	—	—	—	—	—	—	—	—	—	—	0
2011	Hawthorn	36	5	1	3	32	24	56	32	7	0.2	0.6	6.4	4.8	11.2	6.4	1.4	0
2012	Brisbane Lions	19	5	4	4	37	29	66	26	5	0.8	0.8	7.4	5.8	13.2	5.2	1.0	0
2013	Brisbane Lions	19	8	11	5	52	38	90	35	14	1.4	0.6	6.5	4.8	11.3	4.4	1.8	0
2014	Brisbane Lions	19	5	0	0	52	22	74	32	6	0.0	0.0	10.4	4.4	14.8	6.4	1.2	0
Career			23	16	12	173	113	286	125	32	0.7	0.5	7.5	4.9	12.4	5.4	1.4	0

== Honours and achievements ==
Team

- NEAFL premiership player (Brisbane): 2012

Individual

- 3× Jim 'Frosty' Miller Medal: 2015, 2017, 2019
- Under–18 All-Australian team: 2008
