= Ron Irvine =

Australian rules footballer

Personal information
- Full name: Ron Irvine
- Born: 10 March 1927
- Died: 28 April 1984 (aged 57)
- Height: 180 cm (5 ft 11 in)
- Weight: 83 kg (183 lb)

Playing career^{1}
Years	Club	Games (Goals)
1949–51	Richmond	14 (0)
- ^{1} Playing statistics correct to the end of 1951.

Ron Irvine (10 March 1927 – 28 April 1984) was an Australian rules footballer who played with Richmond in the Victorian Football League (VFL).
