= Colin Cruse =

Australian rules footballer

Personal information
- Full name: Colin Cruse
- Born: 24 June 1951 (age 75)
- Original team: Waverley (VFA)
- Height: 185 cm (6 ft 1 in)
- Weight: 82 kg (181 lb)

Playing career^{1}
Years	Club	Games (Goals)
1973–1974	Fitzroy	15 (3)
- ^{1} Playing statistics correct to the end of 1974.

Colin Cruse is a former Australian rules footballer, who played for the Fitzroy Football Club in the Victorian Football League (VFL).
