= Keith White (footballer) =

Australian rules footballer

Personal information
- Full name: Keith White
- Born: 11 February 1934 (age 92)
- Original team: Hawthorn City
- Height: 173 cm (5 ft 8 in)
- Weight: 67 kg (148 lb)

Playing career^{1}
Years	Club	Games (Goals)
1953–55	Hawthorn	16 (7)
- ^{1} Playing statistics correct to the end of 1955.

Keith White (born 11 February 1934) is a former Australian rules footballer who played with Hawthorn in the Victorian Football League (VFL).
