= Brendon Bolton =

Australian rules footballer and coach (born 1979)

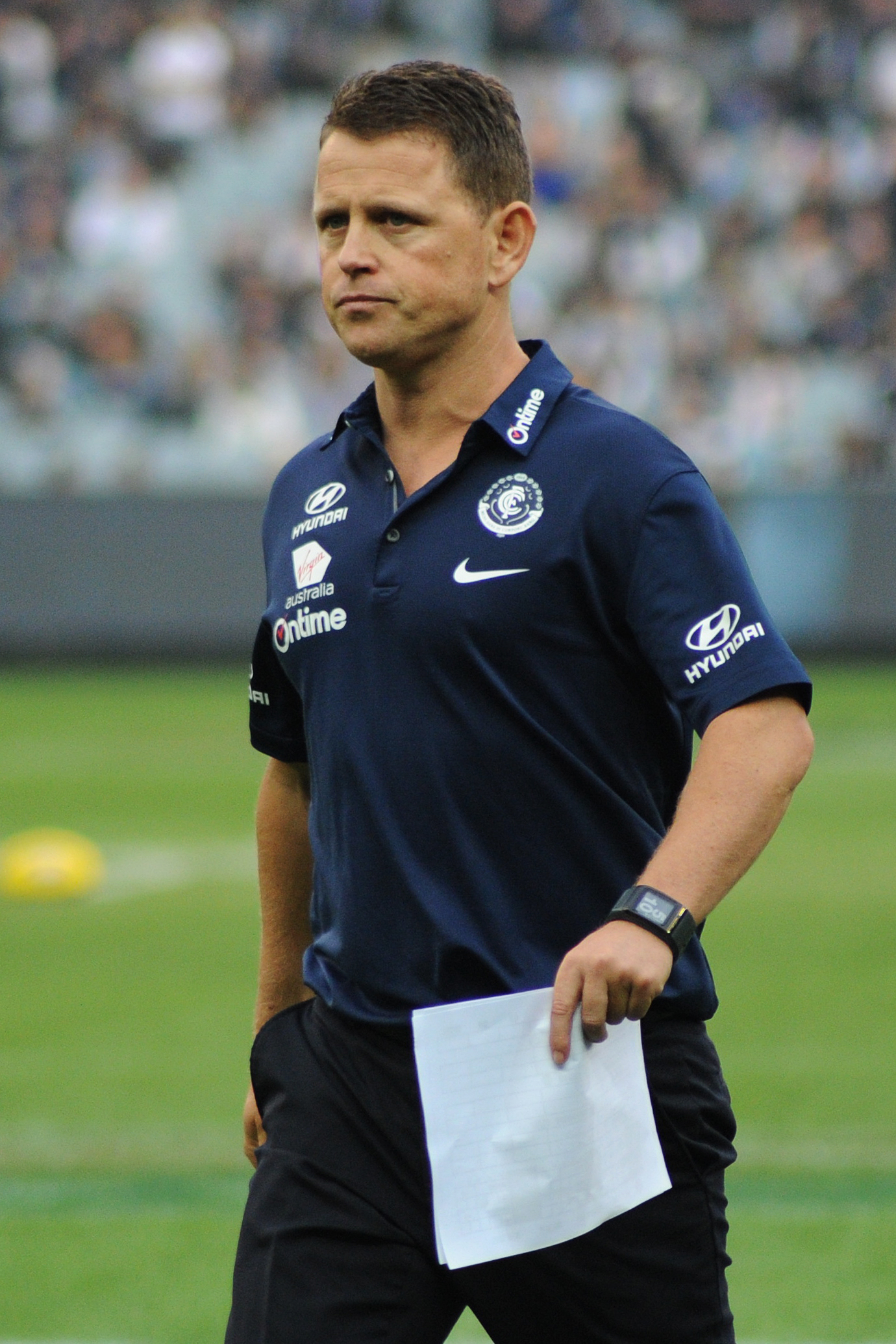
- Bolton with Carlton in April 2018

Personal information
- Full name: Brendon John Bolton
- Nickname: Bolts
- Born: 18 April 1979 (age 47); Launceston, Tasmania

Club information
- Current club: St Kilda (assistant coach)

Coaching career^{3}
Years	Club	Games (W–L–D)
2014	Hawthorn	5 (5–0–0)
2016–2019	Carlton	77 (16–61–0)
- ^{3} Coaching statistics correct as of 2019.

Brendon John Bolton (born 18 April 1979) is an Australian rules football coach who is currently serving as an assistant coach at the St Kilda Football Club in the Australian Football League (AFL). Bolton previously was the head coach of the Carlton Football Club in the AFL, having served in the role from 2016 to 2019. Prior to serving in this role, he served as the head coach of Victorian Football League club Box Hill from November 2008 to October 2010, guiding the club to two consecutive finals series in his two seasons in charge. Bolton would return to Hawthorn shortly after leaving Carlton.

== Playing career ==
At age 19, Bolton played in the 1998 TFL Grand Final. He won the Darrel Baldock Medal for the best player on the ground that day. Bolton would then play 24 games for the Tasmanian Devils in the 2001 and 2002 Victorian Football League seasons. At twenty-four, Bolton was appointed Captain-coach of North Hobart and he led them to the 2003 premiership. He won the Horrie Gorringe Medal that season. His playing career was cut short by a hamstring injury in 2008.

== Coaching career ==
Bolton served as the head coach of Southern Football League club North Hobart, guiding the club to a Southern Football League Premiership in 2003.

Bolton served as the head coach of Victorian Football League club the Tasmanian Devils in 2006, taking over from former Fitzroy and North Melbourne player Matthew Armstrong, who left the club due to internal pressure from the Devils' playing group. He served as head coach for the remainder of the season, after which he was replaced with former Sydney Swans player Daryn Cresswell.

In 2008, Bolton served as the head coach of the Clarence Football Club in the Tasmanian Football League.

Bolton was appointed the head coach of the Box Hill Hawks on 6 November 2008. In his first season with the club in 2009, Bolton enjoyed a relatively successful season in charge, the Hawks finishing 5th on the VFL ladder, with 12 wins and 6 losses. The Hawks defeated Geelong in the First Elimination Final, before narrowly losing an epic semi-final to Port Melbourne 19.10 (124) to 19.14 (128).

In Bolton's second season in charge of the club, the Hawks built on their improved form in 2009 with another strong performance in 2010. After an indifferent start to the season, the team came home strongly with seven consecutive wins in the second half of the season to again finish 5th on the ladder, with 11 wins and 7 losses. The Hawks met the Bendigo Bombers at the Box Hill City Oval in the First Elimination Final, prevailing by 65 points, 20.16 (136) to 10.11 (71). In circumstances similar to that of the previous season, Box Hill won its Elimination Final in strong fashion and again met Port Melbourne in the First Semi-final. In tense a match played in quagmire conditions at North Port Oval, the Hawks defeated Port Melbourne for the first time in a finals game 14.11 (95) to 12.17 (89), with the winning goal coming in the dying seconds. The following week, the Hawks met North Ballarat in the Preliminary Final at the Box Hill City Oval. Despite enjoying home ground advantage, the Hawks went down to the Roosters 16.18 (114) to 6.17 (53) who went on to claim the VFL premiership the following weekend.

In his two seasons in charge of the Box Hill Hawks, Bolton coached 41 VFL Games including finals, achieving 26 wins and 15 losses for a winning percentage of 63.41%.

As a result of his good performances as the head coach of Box Hill, Bolton was promoted to an assistant coaching role with the club's AFL affiliate Hawthorn.

=== Hawthorn ===
Bolton was appointed as an assistant coach at Hawthorn Football Club at the end of 2009, in the position of midfield under senior coach Alastair Clarkson.

In 2014, Bolton coached the Hawthorn Hawks in a NAB Challenge Cup match against North Melbourne, with Hawthorn achieving a 65-point win.

Bolton was made the interim senior coach of the Hawthorn Football Club after regular senior coach Alastair Clarkson was hospitalised and diagnosed with Guillain–Barré syndrome in May 2014. Bolton then coached Hawthorn for five games in the 2014 season in Clarkson's absence, compiling a 5–0 record. After five matches, Clarkson received an endorsement from his doctors to resume his role as senior coach. Bolton is the only senior coach in the club's history to coach the club to five successive victories in his first five games.

=== Carlton ===
On 25 August 2015, Bolton was announced as the senior coach of the Carlton Football Club for the 2016 season, succeeding caretaker senior coach John Barker who had been filling in for the sacked Mick Malthouse. Brendon Bolton's first win at Carlton came on the back of a hard fought 4 point win over Fremantle at Domain Stadium. In the 2016 season, Carlton under Bolton finished fourteenth on the ladder with seven wins and fifteen losses. In the 2017 season, things did not improve for Bolton at the club, when Carlton under Bolton finished sixteenth on the ladder with six wins and sixteen losses. In the 2018 season, Carlton's on-field performance under Bolton, further deteriorated with the performance drop, when the club finished eighteenth, the last position on the ladder for the wooden spoon with two wins and twenty losses.

On 3 June 2019, Bolton was sacked as senior coach of the Carlton Football Club after being defeated by the Essendon Football club in Round 11, 2019. Before his sacking, the club under Bolton had won only one of its 11 matches in the 2019 season, sitting at eighteenth, which is the last position on the ladder. Bolton coached Carlton to a total of 77 games with 16 wins and 61 losses with a winning percentage at 20 percent. Bolton was replaced by assistant coach David Teague as caretaker senior coach of the Carlton Football Club for the rest of the 2019 season, who was eventually appointed full-time senior coach.

=== Return to Hawthorn ===
Following the conclusion of the 2019 season, Bolton returned to Hawthorn to serve as the club's director of coaching under senior coach Clarkson. Bolton would remain in the role until the end of 2020, when he took up an assistant coaching position in the midfield in 2021. At the end of the 2021 season, Alastair Clarkson was replaced as senior coach of Hawthorn by Sam Mitchell.

=== Collingwood ===
Fellow Hawthorn Football Club assistant coach Craig McRae was appointed the senior coach of the Collingwood Football Club. Bolton then departed Hawthorn to join McRae at Collingwood. Bolton served as Director of Coaching and as an assistant coach in the midfield position under senior coach McRae at Collingwood Football Club. At the end of the 2024 season, Bolton left the Collingwood Football Club.

=== St Kilda ===
At the end of the 2024 season on October 15 2024, Bolton joined St Kilda as an assistant coach under senior coach Ross Lyon.

=== Coaching statistics ===
Statistics are correct to the end of the 2019 season

Legend
W	Wins	L	Losses	D	Draws	W%	Winning percentage	LP	Ladder position	LT	League teams

Season	Team	Games	W	L	D	W %	LP	LT
2014^	Hawthorn	5	5	0	0	100.0%	—N/a	18
2016	Carlton	22	7	15	0	31.8%	14	18
2017	Carlton	22	6	16	0	27.2%	16	18
2018	Carlton	22	2	20	0	9.1%	18	18
2019	Carlton	11	1	10	0	9.1%	—N/a	18
Career totals		82	21	61	0	25.6%		

^Bolton was Hawthorn's caretaker coach for five weeks during 2014.
