= Darron Wilkinson =

Australian rules footballer

Personal information
- Full name: Darron Wilkinson
- Born: 22 November 1969 (age 56)
- Original teams: Camberwell, (VFA)
- Draft: 1. 17, 1990 Mid-year Draft

Playing career^{1}
Years	Club	Games (Goals)
1991	Fitzroy	1 (0)
- ^{1} Playing statistics correct to the end of 1991.

Darron Wilkinson (born 22 November 1969) is a former Australian rules footballer who played for Fitzroy in the Australian Football League (AFL) in 1991.

He was recruited from the Camberwell Football Club in the Victorian Football Association (VFA) with the 17th selection in the 1990 Mid-year Draft.

After being delisted by Fitzroy he joined the Box Hill Football Club and played over 100 games for them. He is second on Box Hill's all-time leading goalkicker list and was selected in their Greatest Ever Team.
