= Jarrod Molloy =

Australian rules footballer

Personal information
- Born: 12 May 1976 (age 50)
- Original team: Northern Knights U18 / Box Hill
- Debut: Round 2, 1994, Fitzroy vs. Essendon, at Princes Park
- Height: 189 cm (6 ft 2 in)
- Weight: 101 kg (223 lb)

Playing career^{1}
Years	Club	Games (Goals)
1994–1996	Fitzroy	59 (54)
1997–2000	Brisbane Lions	61 (104)
2001–2003	Collingwood	49 (42)
Total		169 (200)
- ^{1} Playing statistics correct to the end of 2003.

Career highlights
- Brisbane Lions leading Goalkicker: 1999; AFL Rising Star nominee: 1994; AFL Goal of the Year: 1999; VFL premiership player: 2003

Jarrod Molloy (born 12 May 1976) is a former Australian rules footballer who played for Fitzroy, Brisbane Lions and Collingwood in the Australian Football League (AFL).

== Early life ==
Molloy was born on 12 May 1976 and is the son of former Fitzroy defender and VFA coach Shane Molloy. His niece, Chloe Molloy plays for Sydney Swans women's.

Molloy attended Parade College where he played on the school football team.

== Playing career ==
A key position player, Molloy was trialled in both attack and defence as his career progressed, with most success enjoyed near the goalmouth.

Although he had some success with both Fitzroy and Brisbane, Molloy hit his straps upon reaching Collingwood. He immediately assumed the role of a club leader, and surprised many in finishing runner up to Paul Licuria in the 2001 Copeland Trophy.

At the end of 2003, Molloy announced his retirement from the game at the age of 28, citing the desire to be able to walk properly on his troublesome ankles. He currently provides special comments for ABC football radio.
