= Stephen James (footballer) =

Australian rules footballer

Personal information
- Full name: Stephen James
- Born: 31 March 1965 (age 61)
- Original team: Waverley
- Height: 188 cm (6 ft 2 in)
- Weight: 88 kg (194 lb)

Playing career^{1}
Years	Club	Games (Goals)
1985–90	Richmond	77 (78)
- ^{1} Playing statistics correct to the end of 1990.

Stephen James (born 31 March 1965) is a former Australian rules footballer who played with Richmond in the Victorian Football League (VFL).
