= Mark Lisle =

Australian rules footballer

Personal information
- Full name: Mark Lisle
- Born: 12 August 1962 (age 64)
- Original team: Upper Ferntree Gully
- Height: 193 cm (6 ft 4 in)
- Weight: 90 kg (198 lb)

Playing career^{1}
Years	Club	Games (Goals)
1984–89	North Melbourne	37 (14)
- ^{1} Playing statistics correct to the end of 1989.

Mark Lisle (born 12 August 1962) is a former Australian rules footballer who played with North Melbourne in the Victorian Football League (VFL). Following his VFL career, he played five seasons with Box Hill in the Victorian Football Association, captaining the club from 1991 until 1993 and being named on the interchange bench in the club's Team of the Century.
