= Cliff Eade =

Australian rules footballer

Personal information
- Full name: Clifford Gordon Eade
- Born: 24 May 1933
- Died: 19 August 2017 (aged 84)
- Height: 179 cm (5 ft 10 in)
- Weight: 90 kg (198 lb)

Playing career^{1}
Years	Club	Games (Goals)
1954	Richmond	1 (0)
- ^{1} Playing statistics correct to the end of 1954.

Clifford Gordon Eade (24 May 1933 – 19 August 2017) was an Australian rules footballer who played for Richmond in the Victorian Football League (VFL).
