= 2014 VFL season =

133rd season of the Victorian Football League

- Teams: 16
- Premiers: Footscray reserves 1st premiership
- Minor premiers: Port Melbourne; 20th minor premiership
- J. J. Liston Trophy: Alex Woodward (Box Hill Hawks)
- Leading goalkicker: Daniel Connors (Port Melbourne); Sam Grimley (Box Hill Hawks) 38 goals each

The 2014 VFL season was the 133rd season of the Victorian Football League (VFL), a second-tier Australian rules football competition played in the state of Victoria.

Footscray reserves won the premiership for the first time, defeating Box Hill by 22 points in the 2014 VFL Grand Final.

== League membership ==
The VFL increased from fourteen teams to sixteen teams in 2014, following the end of two VFL-AFL affiliations:

- AFL club Richmond and VFL club Coburg ended their alignment, which had been in place since 2001. Richmond re-entered a stand-alone reserves team in the VFL, having previously fielded one in the 2000 season. Coburg continued as a stand-alone VFL club, and returned to using 'the Lions' as its mascot, having been known by Richmond's nickname of 'the Tigers' during the affiliation.
- AFL club Western Bulldogs and VFL club Williamstown ended their alignment. The Bulldogs entered its stand-alone reserves team in the VFL for the first time, playing under the club's traditional name of Footscray. Williamstown continued as a stand-alone VFL club.

The Development League was reduced from ten teams to nine, with North Ballarat withdrawing its team; this left only the nine metropolitan VFL clubs competing in the seconds competition, with all five AFL clubs and both regional VFL clubs (North Ballarat and Bendigo) absent.

== Home-and-away season ==
Features of the fixture included:

- A Good Friday game between previously aligned teams Bendigo Gold and Essendon reserves.
- Three matches in once-off regional Victorian locations: Echuca, Morwell and Swan Hill.

Source: VFL season 2014 Results and Fixtures (*Note that only at some games are attendances recorded)

=== Round 1 ===
	Round 1
Saturday 29 March (1:00 pm)	Collingwood 11.19 (85)	def.	North Ballarat 11.7 (73)	Victoria Park
Saturday 29 March (2:00 pm)	Coburg 8.8 (56)	def. by	Port Melbourne 19.15 (129)	Piranha Park
Friday 4 April (7:00 pm)	Bendigo 11.8 (74)	def. by	Geelong 18.13 (121)	Queen Elizabeth Oval
Saturday 5 April (10:30 am)	Footscray 26.9 (165)	def.	Richmond 7.6 (48)	VU Whitten Oval (crowd: 5,000)
Saturday 5 April (1:10 pm)	Frankston 11.21 (87)	def. by	Sandringham 17.5 (107)	Frankston Park
Saturday 5 April (2:00 pm)	Box Hill 12.11 (83)	def.	Werribee 7.16 (58)	Box Hill City Oval (crowd: 1,475)
Sunday 6 April (1:00 pm)	Essendon 11.14 (80)	def. by	Casey 12.14 (86)	Windy Hill
Sunday 6 April (2:00 pm)	Northern Blues 15.11 (101)	def.	Williamstown 14.13 (97)	Visy Park
Note that the Round 15 match between Williamstown and Box Hill was played on this weekend of March 29

=== Round 2 ===
	Round 2
Saturday 12 April (1:10 pm)	Essendon 11.12 (78)	def.	North Ballarat 9.10 (64)	Windy Hill
Saturday 12 April (2:00 pm)	Port Melbourne 19.10 (124)	def.	Collingwood 9.17 (71)	North Port Oval
Saturday 12 April (2:30 pm)	Northern Blues 15.12 (102)	def.	Frankston 15.9 (99)	Visy Park
Sunday 13 April (2:00 pm)	Werribee 24.13 (157)	def.	Bendigo 11.8 (74)	Avalon Airport Oval
Sunday 13 April (2:00 pm)	Coburg 7.9 (51)	def. by	Richmond 14.9 (93)	Piranha Park
Sunday 13 April (2:00 pm)	Casey 12.14 (86)	def. by	Geelong 14.18 (102)	Casey Fields
Sunday 13 April (2:00 pm)	Box Hill 15.14 (104)	drew with	Sandringham 14.20 (104)	Box Hill City Oval (crowd: 1,610)
Sunday 13 April (2:00 pm)	Williamstown 15.8 (98)	def.	Footscray 7.15 (57)	Burbank Oval
Luke Reynolds won the game for the Northern Blues with a goal after the siren.

=== Round 3 ===
	Round 3
Friday 18 April (2:30 pm)	Bendigo 9.9 (63)	def. by	Essendon 11.25 (91)	Queen Elizabeth Oval
Saturday 19 April (11:00 am)	Collingwood 15.17 (107)	def.	Coburg 9.9 (63)	Victoria Park
Saturday 19 April (12:15 pm)	Williamstown 19.15 (129)	def.	Richmond 8.11 (59)	Burbank Oval
Saturday 19 April (1:10 pm)	Port Melbourne 16.11 (107)	def.	Werribee 14.10 (94)	North Port Oval
Saturday 19 April (2:00 pm)	North Ballarat 12.10 (82)	def. by	Sandringham 18.9 (117)	Eureka Stadium
Saturday 19 April (6:00 pm)	Geelong 14.11 (95)	def. by	Box Hill 17.20 (122)	Simonds Stadium
Sunday 20 April (12:00 pm)	Footscray 13.9 (87)	def. by	Northern Blues 16.16 (112)	VU Whitten Oval
Sunday 20 April (2:00 pm)	Frankston 6.18 (54)	def. by	Casey 9.14 (68)	Frankston Park
The match between Williamstown and Richmond was moved from ME Bank Centre to Burbank Oval because of unfinished redevelopment works.

=== Round 4 ===
	Round 4
Friday 25 April (2:00 pm)	Frankston 14.15 (99)	drew with	Richmond 15.9 (99)	Frankston Park
Friday 25 April (6:30 pm)	Bendigo 7.6 (48)	def. by	Footscray 33.16 (214)	Queen Elizabeth Oval
Saturday 26 April (1:10 pm)	Essendon 13.9 (87)	def. by	Collingwood 17.10 (112)	Windy Hill
Saturday 26 April (2:00 pm)	Coburg 10.9 (69)	def. by	Box Hill 17.19 (121)	Piranha Park
Saturday 26 April (7:00 pm)	Werribee 20.15 (135)	def.	Northern Blues 3.15 (33)	Avalon Airport Oval
Sunday 27 April (12:00 pm)	Geelong 12.15 (87)	def.	North Ballarat 8.14 (62)	Simonds Stadium
Sunday 27 April (2:00 pm)	Casey 5.9 (39)	def. by	Sandringham 14.13 (97)	Casey Fields
Sunday 27 April (2:00 pm)	Williamstown 5.14 (44)	def. by	Port Melbourne 10.11 (71)	Burbank Oval

=== Round 5 ===
	Round 5
Saturday 3 May (1:10 pm)	Northern Blues 9.15 (69)	def. by	Coburg 12.6 (78)	Preston City Oval
Saturday 3 May (2:00 pm)	Box Hill 22.10 (142)	def.	Frankston 5.6 (36)	Box Hill City Oval (crowd: 573)
Saturday 3 May (2:00 pm)	Port Melbourne 17.20 (122)	def.	Bendigo 8.7 (55)	North Port Oval
Sunday 4 May (11:30 am)	Richmond 18.7 (115)	def.	Geelong 8.16 (64)	ME Bank Centre
Sunday 4 May (2:00 pm)	Williamstown 14.9 (93)	def.	Collingwood 10.10 (70)	Burbank Oval
Sunday 4 May (2:00 pm)	Casey 8.5 (53)	def. by	Werribee 8.10 (58)	Casey Fields
Sunday 4 May (2:00 pm)	North Ballarat 10.7 (67)	def.	Footscray 8.17 (65)	Eureka Stadium
Sunday 4 May (2:00 pm)	Sandringham 17.17 (119)	def.	Essendon 16.14 (110)	Trevor Barker Beach Oval

=== Round 6 ===
	Round 6
Saturday 10 May (1:10 pm)	Footscray 19.8 (122)	def.	Sandringham 12.10 (82)	Simonds Stadium
Saturday 10 May (2:00 pm)	Northern Blues 8.7 (55)	def. by	Casey 10.11 (71)	Visy Park
Sunday 11 May (2:00 pm)	Frankston 8.14 (62)	def. by	Williamstown 18.10 (118)	Frankston Park
	Bye; Bendigo, Box Hill, Coburg, Collingwood, Essendon, Geelong, North Ballarat, Port Melbourne, Richmond, Werribee

=== Round 7 ===
	Round 7
Saturday 17 May (10:40 am)	Richmond 8.12 (60)	def. by	Box Hill 13.11 (89)	ME Bank Centre
Saturday 17 May (1:00 pm)	Essendon 10.7 (67)	def. by	Port Melbourne 10.25 (85)	Windy Hill
Saturday 17 May (1:10 pm)	Williamstown 18.15 (123)	def.	Geelong 14.14 (98)	Burbank Oval
Saturday 17 May (2:00 pm)	Sandringham 8.11 (59)	def. by	Werribee 18.18 (126)	Trevor Barker Beach Oval
Saturday 17 May (2:00 pm)	Collingwood 21.26 (152)	def.	Bendigo 5.7 (37)	Victoria Park
Sunday 18 May (2:00 pm)	Coburg 11.8 (74)	def.	Casey 9.12 (66)	Piranha Park
Sunday 18 May (2:00 pm)	North Ballarat 12.7 (79)	def.	Frankston 11.8 (74)	Eureka Stadium
	Bye; Footscray, Northern Blues
North Ballarat coach Gerard FitzGerald coached his 314th VFL game, surpassing Bill Faul to become the longest-serving coach in VFA/VFL history.

=== Round 8 ===
	Round 8
Saturday 24 May (12:00 pm)	Collingwood 19.12 (126)	def.	Geelong 12.14 (86)	Victoria Park
Saturday 24 May (1:00 pm)	Essendon 16.11 (107)	def.	Northern Blues 8.15 (63)	Windy Hill (crowd: 3,000)
Saturday 24 May (1:10 pm)	Werribee 17.14 (116)	def.	Richmond 8.17 (65)	Avalon Airport Oval
Saturday 24 May (2:00 pm)	Coburg 11.10 (76)	def. by	Footscray 16.14 (110)	Piranha Park
Sunday 25 May (1:30 pm)	Bendigo 7.8 (50)	def. by	North Ballarat 22.17 (149)	Alan Garden Reserve
Sunday 25 May (2:00 pm)	Box Hill 13.14 (92)	def. by	Port Melbourne 15.9 (99)	Box Hill City Oval (crowd: 2,315)
	Bye; Casey, Frankston, Sandringham, Williamstown

=== State Game ===
	2014 State Game
Saturday 31 May (1:10 pm)	VFL 14.12 (96)	def. by	SANFL 18.10 (118)	North Port Oval	Report
This was the first time since 2005 that the VFL and SANFL competitions met in a state game in Victoria; Frank Johnson Medal (VFL): Adam Marcon; Fos Williams Medallist (SANFL): Zane Kirkwood

=== Round 9 ===
	Round 9
Saturday 31 May (2:00 pm)	Richmond 16.15 (111)	def.	Essendon 10.15 (75)	ME Bank Centre
Saturday 7 June (1:00 pm)	Geelong 13.8 (86)	def.	Port Melbourne 12.11 (83)	Simonds Stadium
Saturday 7 June (2:00 pm)	Box Hill 8.11 (59)	def. by	North Ballarat 8.13 (61)	Box Hill City Oval (crowd: 878)
Saturday 7 June (2:00 pm)	Casey 11.7 (73)	def. by	Collingwood 11.13 (79)	Casey Fields
Saturday 7 June (2:00 pm)	Northern Blues 11.7 (73)	def.	Sandringham 9.7 (61)	Visy Park
Saturday 7 June (2:00 pm)	Frankston 10.16 (76)	def. by	Footscray 13.12 (90)	Frankston Park
Sunday 8 June (1:30 pm)	Bendigo 6.13 (49)	def. by	Coburg 17.15 (117)	Queen Elizabeth Oval
Sunday 8 June (2:00 pm)	Williamstown 9.20 (74)	def.	Werribee 9.11 (65)	Burbank Oval
The match between Richmond and Essendon was played a week earlier than the rest of the round. It was played on the afternoon before the AFL's Dreamtime at the 'G game that evening between Richmond's and Essendon's senior teams.; Two-time Brownlow Medallist Chris Judd participated in his first ever VFL premiership match, for the Northern Blues.

=== Round 10 ===
	Round 10
Saturday 14 June (11:00 am)	Richmond 11.14 (80)	def. by	Northern Blues 12.15 (87)	ME Bank Centre
Saturday 14 June (1:10 pm)	Port Melbourne 13.8 (86)	def. by	Footscray 19.8 (122)	North Port Oval
Saturday 14 June (2:00 pm)	Box Hill 14.9 (93)	def.	Williamstown 10.12 (72)	Box Hill City Oval (crowd: 961)
Saturday 14 June (2:00 pm)	Sandringham 14.20 (104)	def.	Collingwood 8.12 (60)	Trevor Barker Beach Oval
Saturday 14 June (2:00 pm)	Coburg 8.10 (58)	def. by	Geelong 20.15 (135)	Piranha Park
Saturday 14 June (2:00 pm)	North Ballarat 11.17 (83)	def.	Casey 9.9 (63)	Eureka Stadium
Sunday 15 June (1:00 pm)	Werribee 15.7 (97)	def. by	Essendon 14.14 (98)	Avalon Airport Oval
Sunday 15 June (2:00 pm)	Frankston 12.16 (88)	def.	Bendigo 6.16 (52)	Frankston Park

=== Round 11 ===
	Round 11
Saturday 21 June (12:00 pm)	Geelong 11.12 (78)	def. by	Werribee 13.9 (87)	Simonds Stadium
Saturday 21 June (1:10 pm)	Casey 6.8 (44)	def. by	Box Hill 19.15 (129)	Casey Fields
Saturday 21 June (2:00 pm)	Port Melbourne 14.19 (103)	def.	Frankston 9.7 (61)	North Port Oval
Sunday 22 June (1:30 pm)	Bendigo 14.6 (90)	def. by	Northern Blues 14.11 (95)	Victoria Park, Echuca
Sunday 22 June (2:00 pm)	Coburg 10.13 (73)	def. by	Essendon 18.8 (118)	Piranha Park
Sunday 22 June (2:00 pm)	Collingwood 10.9 (69)	def. by	Footscray 17.12 (114)	Victoria Park
Sunday 22 June (2:00 pm)	Williamstown 16.10 (106)	def.	Sandringham 11.16 (82)	Burbank Oval
Sunday 22 June (2:25 pm)	North Ballarat 18.17 (125)	def.	Richmond 10.5 (65)	Eureka Stadium

=== Round 12 ===
	Round 12
Saturday 28 June (1:10 pm)	Frankston 8.12 (60)	drew with	Essendon 8.12 (60)	Frankston Park
Saturday 28 June (2:00 pm)	Collingwood 19.18 (132)	def.	Richmond 13.5 (83)	Morwell Recreation Reserve
Saturday 28 June (2:00 pm)	Casey 4.6 (30)	def. by	Williamstown 16.14 (110)	Casey Fields
Saturday 28 June (2:00 pm)	Footscray 6.15 (51)	def.	North Ballarat 2.10 (22)	Simonds Stadium
Sunday 29 June (1:00 pm)	Northern Blues 3.7 (25)	def. by	Geelong 14.12 (96)	Visy Park
Sunday 29 June (2:00 pm)	Werribee 8.12 (60)	def.	Coburg 6.11 (47)	Avalon Airport Oval
Sunday 29 June (2:00 pm)	Sandringham 15.19 (109)	def.	Bendigo 5.14 (44)	Trevor Barker Beach Oval
	Bye; Box Hill, Port Melbourne

=== Round 13 ===
	Round 13
Saturday 5 July (11:00 am)	Richmond 15.16 (106)	def.	Casey 10.11 (71)	ME Bank Centre
Saturday 5 July (1:00 pm)	Werribee 15.16 (106)	def.	North Ballarat 12.12 (84)	Avalon Airport Oval
Saturday 5 July (1:00 pm)	Essendon 14.7 (91)	def.	Box Hill 13.10 (88)	Highgate Recreation Reserve
Saturday 5 July (1:10 pm)	Sandringham 8.17 (65)	def. by	Port Melbourne 13.16 (94)	Trevor Barker Beach Oval
Sunday 6 July (1:00 pm)	Geelong 7.11 (53)	def. by	Footscray 15.15 (105)	Simonds Stadium
Sunday 6 July (2:15 pm)	Northern Blues 16.9 (105)	def.	Collingwood 12.15 (87)	Preston City Oval
	Bye; Bendigo, Coburg, Frankston, Williamstown

=== Round 14 ===
	Round 14
Saturday 12 July (1:00 pm)	Collingwood 8.18 (66)	def.	Werribee 5.5 (35)	Victoria Park
Saturday 12 July (2:00 pm)	Footscray 13.11 (89)	def. by	Box Hill 15.6 (96)	VU Whitten Oval
Saturday 12 July (2:00 pm)	Port Melbourne 13.8 (86)	def.	Essendon 12.10 (82)	North Port Oval
Saturday 12 July (2:00 pm)	Bendigo 12.12 (84)	def. by	Casey 12.14 (86)	Queen Elizabeth Oval
Saturday 12 July (7:30 pm)	Geelong 13.8 (86)	def. by	Richmond 13.12 (90)	Simonds Stadium
Sunday 13 July (2:00 pm)	Coburg 12.10 (82)	def. by	Williamstown 14.9 (93)	Piranha Park
Sunday 13 July (2:00 pm)	North Ballarat 15.13 (103)	def.	Northern Blues 8.15 (63)	Eureka Stadium
Sunday 13 July (2:00 pm)	Sandringham 6.16 (52)	def. by	Frankston 10.13 (73)	Trevor Barker Beach Oval

=== Round 15 ===
	Round 15
Saturday 29 March (2:00 pm)	Williamstown 11.16 (82)	def. by	Box Hill 13.17 (95)	Burbank Oval
Saturday 19 July (1:10 pm)	North Ballarat 21.16 (142)	def.	Bendigo 9.9 (63)	Eureka Stadium
Saturday 19 July (2:00 pm)	Casey 12.10 (82)	def. by	Frankston 13.10 (88)	Casey Fields
Saturday 19 July (2:00 pm)	Northern Blues 8.7 (55)	def. by	Werribee 11.18 (84)	Visy Park
Saturday 19 July (2:00 pm)	Port Melbourne 19.15 (129)	def.	Coburg 11.11 (77)	North Port Oval
Sunday 20 July (12:00 pm)	Footscray 17.14 (116)	def.	Essendon 9.9 (63)	VU Whitten Oval
Sunday 20 July (2:00 pm)	Sandringham 6.9 (45)	def. by	Geelong 27.12 (174)	Trevor Barker Beach Oval
	Bye; Collingwood, Richmond
The match between Williamstown and Box Hill was brought forward to the opening weekend of the season to accommodate their Foxtel Cup fixtures.

=== Round 16 ===
	Round 16
Saturday 26 July (1:10 pm)	Richmond 8.7 (55)	def. by	Port Melbourne 13.19 (97)	ME Bank Centre
Sunday 27 July (2:00 pm)	Frankston 12.10 (82)	def.	Collingwood 9.11 (65)	Frankston Park
Sunday 27 July (2:00 pm)	Box Hill 16.19 (115)	def.	Coburg 14.9 (93)	Box Hill City Oval (crowd: 1,249)
Sunday 27 July (2:00 pm)	Williamstown 21.17 (143)	def.	Bendigo 12.10 (82)	Burbank Oval
	Bye; Casey, Essendon, Footscray, Geelong, Northern Blues, North Ballarat, Sandringham, Werribee

=== Round 17 ===
	Round 17
Saturday 2 August (12:00 pm)	Geelong 19.20 (134)	def.	Frankston 10.13 (73)	Simonds Stadium
Saturday 2 August (1:00 pm)	Collingwood 13.14 (92)	def.	Box Hill 12.9 (81)	Victoria Park
Saturday 2 August (1:00 pm)	Richmond 16.10 (106)	def. by	Sandringham 18.11 (119)	ME Bank Centre
Saturday 2 August (1:10 pm)	Essendon 8.13 (61)	def. by	Williamstown 20.12 (132)	Highgate Recreation Reserve
Saturday 2 August (2:00 pm)	Casey 13.14 (92)	def.	Northern Blues 6.14 (50)	Casey Fields
Sunday 3 August (12:00 pm)	Footscray 22.15 (147)	def.	Bendigo 1.10 (16)	VU Whitten Oval
Sunday 3 August (2:00 pm)	Werribee 9.15 (69)	def. by	Port Melbourne 13.15 (93)	Avalon Airport Oval
Sunday 3 August (2:00 pm)	Coburg 10.4 (64)	def. by	North Ballarat 12.18 (90)	Piranha Park

=== Round 18 ===
	Round 18
Saturday 9 August (1:10 pm)	Collingwood 11.16 (82)	def.	Essendon 9.11 (65)	Victoria Park
Saturday 9 August (2:00 pm)	Port Melbourne 23.18 (156)	def.	Casey 7.6 (48)	North Port Oval
Saturday 9 August (2:00 pm)	Sandringham 17.13 (115)	def.	Coburg 9.16 (70)	Trevor Barker Beach Oval
Saturday 9 August (6:30 pm)	Bendigo 7.12 (54)	def. by	Richmond 23.14 (152)	Queen Elizabeth Oval
Sunday 10 August (1:00 pm)	Werribee 10.12 (72)	def. by	Footscray 17.10 (112)	Avalon Airport Oval
Sunday 10 August (2:00 pm)	North Ballarat 12.9 (81)	def.	Geelong 9.10 (64)	Eureka Stadium
Sunday 10 August (2:00 pm)	Williamstown 14.18 (102)	def.	Northern Blues 9.8 (62)	Burbank Oval
Sunday 10 August (2:00 pm)	Frankston 4.9 (33)	def. by	Box Hill 9.9 (63)	Frankston Park

=== Round 19 ===
	Round 19
Saturday 16 August (11:00 am)	Geelong 12.15 (87)	def. by	Collingwood 16.5 (101)	Simonds Stadium
Saturday 16 August (1:00 pm)	Essendon 13.15 (93)	def.	Richmond 11.13 (79)	Highgate Recreation Reserve
Saturday 16 August (1:10 pm)	Werribee 12.9 (81)	def. by	Sandringham 15.11 (101)	Avalon Airport Oval
Saturday 16 August (2:00 pm)	Northern Blues 9.6 (60)	def. by	Port Melbourne 18.17 (125)	Preston City Oval
Saturday 16 August (2:00 pm)	Box Hill 16.17 (113)	def.	Bendigo 7.8 (50)	Box Hill City Oval (crowd: 1,162)
Saturday 16 August (2:00 pm)	North Ballarat 8.10 (58)	def. by	Williamstown 9.17 (71)	Eureka Stadium
Sunday 17 August (11:00 am)	Footscray 12.10 (82)	def.	Casey 8.7 (55)	Highgate Recreation Reserve
Sunday 17 August (2:00 pm)	Coburg 10.14 (74)	def.	Frankston 8.11 (59)	Piranha Park

=== Round 20 ===
	Round 20
Friday 22 August (6:30 pm)	Bendigo 13.7 (85)	def. by	Collingwood 20.11 (131)	Queen Elizabeth Oval
Friday 22 August (7:30 pm)	Geelong 18.11 (119)	def.	Essendon 9.11 (65)	Simonds Stadium
Saturday 23 August (1:10 pm)	Box Hill 26.15 (171)	def.	Northern Blues 6.6 (42)	Box Hill City Oval (crowd: 1,341)
Saturday 23 August (2:00 pm)	Port Melbourne 24.20 (164)	def.	North Ballarat 7.11 (53)	North Port Oval
Saturday 23 August (2:00 pm)	Sandringham 9.8 (62)	def. by	Williamstown 17.15 (117)	Trevor Barker Beach Oval
Sunday 24 August (1:00 pm)	Richmond 15.10 (100)	def. by	Footscray 14.19 (103)	ME Bank Centre
Sunday 24 August (2:00 pm)	Frankston 12.6 (78)	def. by	Werribee 15.13 (103)	Frankston Park
Sunday 24 August (2:00 pm)	Casey 10.9 (69)	def. by	Coburg 13.8 (86)	Casey Fields

== Ladder ==
2014 VFL ladder
Pos	Team	Pld	W	L	D	PF	PA	PP	Pts	
1	Port Melbourne	18	16	2	0	1953	1257	155.4	64	Finals series
2	Footscray (P)	18	14	4	0	1951	1239	157.5	56	Finals series
3	Williamstown	18	14	4	0	1808	1290	140.2	56	Finals series
4	Box Hill Hawks	18	13	4	1	1856	1270	146.1	54	Finals series
5	Collingwood	18	12	6	0	1687	1486	113.5	48	Finals series
6	Werribee	18	10	8	0	1603	1360	117.9	40	Finals series
7	North Ballarat	18	10	8	0	1478	1389	106.4	40	Finals series
8	Sandringham	18	9	8	1	1600	1668	95.9	38	Finals series
9	Geelong	18	9	9	0	1765	1521	116.0	36	
10	Essendon	18	7	10	1	1491	1635	91.2	30	
11	Northern Blues	18	7	11	0	1252	1765	70.9	28	
12	Richmond	18	6	11	1	1571	1755	89.5	26	
13	Frankston	18	4	12	2	1282	1593	80.5	20	
14	Coburg	18	5	13	0	1308	1727	75.7	20	
15	Casey Scorpions	18	5	13	0	1182	1573	75.1	20	
16	Bendigo	18	0	18	0	1070	2329	45.9	0	

Source: Ladder for 2014 Peter Jackson VFL
Rules for classification: 1) points; 2) percentage; 3) number of points for.
(P) Premiers

== Finals series ==
=== Qualifying and elimination finals ===
	Qualifying Finals
Saturday 30 August (2:10 pm)	Port Melbourne 12.6 (78)	def. by	Box Hill 16.6 (102)	North Port Oval	Report
Sunday 31 August (1:00 pm)	Footscray 14.11 (95)	def.	Williamstown 10.15 (75)	VU Whitten Oval	Report

	Elimination Finals
Saturday 30 August (2:00 pm)	Collingwood 5.15 (45)	def. by	Sandringham 10.11 (71)	Victoria Park	Report
Sunday 31 August (2:10 pm)	Werribee 13.12 (90)	def.	North Ballarat 7.11 (53)	North Port Oval	Report

=== Semi-finals ===
	Semi-finals
Saturday 6 September (2:10pm)	Port Melbourne 16.23 (119)	def.	Sandringham 11.6 (72)	North Port Oval	Report
Sunday 7 September (2:10pm)	Williamstown 15.15 (105)	def.	Werribee 11.13 (79)	North Port Oval	Report

=== Preliminary finals ===
	Preliminary Finals
Saturday 13 September (2:10 pm)	Footscray 20.10 (130)	def.	Port Melbourne 14.14 (98)	North Port Oval	Report
Sunday 14 September (2:10 pm)	Box Hill 15.10 (100)	def.	Williamstown 14.9 (93)	North Port Oval	Report

=== Grand Final ===
2014 VFL Grand Final
Sunday 21 September (2:15 pm)	Footscray	def.	Box Hill	Etihad Stadium (crowd: 23,816)	Report; Summary
4.2 (26); 7.4 (46); 10.7 (67); 16.13 (109)	Q1; Q2; Q3; Final	4.2 (26); 7.3 (45); 11.7 (73); 13.9 (87)	Norm Goss Memorial Medal: Brett Goodes (Footscray); Television broadcast: ABC
5: Jones; 2: Redpath, Dickson; 1: Young, Howard, Fogarty, Grant, Tutt, Campbell, Pearce	Goals	3: Sicily; 2: Ross, Hallahan; 1: Grimley, Woodward, Hartung, Willsmore, Lowden, Collins
Goodes, Jong, Jones, Campbell, Fogarty, Darley	Best	Hallahan, Sicily, Hartung, Litherland, Ross, Iles
Footscray's appearance (as a reserves team) marked the first time a VFA/VFL team reached or won a Grand Final in its inaugural season.; The attendance of 23,816 was the biggest Grand Final attendance in the VFA/VFL in 25 years. It was also the largest crowd for any VFA/VFL match that Box Hill has played in.; Hawthorn AFL-listed player Cyril Rioli played his first ever game for Box Hill in the Grand Final; Rioli was returning after missing three months of football with a hamstring injury, and was attempting to prove form and fitness to play in the following week's AFL Grand Final.

== Foxtel Cup ==
The two highest ranked non-AFL exclusive teams from the 2013 season (premiers Box Hill and third placed Williamstown) were invited to compete in the Foxtel Cup knockout competition for 2014. Box Hill was eliminated in the first round of the tournament, and Williamstown recorded comfortable victories in all three fixtures, earning a second Foxtel Cup title in club history.

=== Round 1 ===
Game #2 6 May 2014; 20:35 EST	Box Hill (Victoria (state))	51–53 stand alone game	(Western Australia) West Perth	Etihad Stadium
	0.4 (4); 1.6 (12); 5.7 (37); 7.9 (51)	match report match statistics	2.0 (12); 4.7 (31); 5.9 (39); 7.11 (53)
		Goals
	Sicily 3, Ross 3, Willsmore		Black, Brown, Adams, Tsalikis, Kerr, Bartholomew, Johnson
		Bests
	Woodward, Kennedy, Ross, Isles, Sicily, Mirra		Nelson, Jones, Manning, Crisp, Guadagnin, Morrow

Game #3 20 May 2014; 20:35 EST	Williamstown (Victoria (state))	93–48 stand alone game	(Queensland) Aspley	MCG
	4.1 (25); 5.4 (34); 9.7 (61); 14.9 (93)	match report match statistics	1.2 (8); 4.3 (27); 5.5 (35); 7.6 (48)
		Goals
	A.Marcon 3, J.Owen 3, S.Clouston 2, D.Conway 2, J.Johnstone, M.Gibbons, S.Tighe, C.Nastasi		A.Hughes 2, J.Nelis, J.Williams, R.Matthews, C.French, M.Payne.
		Bests
	A.Marcon, S.Tighe, N.Sing, J.Johnstone, M.Gibbons.		R.Matthews, M.Payne, J.Williams, R.Copeland, A.Lucy.

=== Semi-finals ===
Semi-final #2 1 July 2014; 20:35 EST	Williamstown (Victoria (state))	71–47 stand alone game	(Western Australia) East Perth	Patersons Stadium, Perth match report match statistics
	1.3 (9); 4.4 (28); 7.5 (47); 10.11 (71)	match report	2.1 (13); 4.2 (26); 6.3 (39); 7.5 (47)
		Goals
	J.Owen 2, S.Hetherington, A.Anastasio, J.Johnstone, J.Dorgan, S.Critchley, A.Woods, S.Wyatt, K.Lambert		J.Hill 3, A.Carter, F.McInness, B.Colledge, B.Lee
		Bests
	K.Lambert, J.Johnstone, M.Gibbons, J.Owen, S.Tighe, S.Critchley, A.Mangan		S.Payne, P.Johnson, Colledge, B.Lee, J.Hill, J.Oakley-Nicholls

=== Grand final ===
Grand Final 22 July 2014; 20:35 EST	West Perth (Western Australia)	8–71 stand alone game	(Victoria (state)) Williamstown	Simonds Stadium, Geelong match report match statistics
	0.2 (2); 0.2 (2); 0.2 (2); 1.2 (8)	match report	5.4 (34); 5.9 (39); 7.11 (53); 10.11 (71)
		Goals
	C.Chalmers		C.Nastasi 2, S.Clouston 2, J.Johnstone 2, J.Owen, J.Dorgan, K.Lambert, S.Tighe
		Bests
	A.Strijk, R.Kerr, L.Tedesco		B.Davies, K.Lambert, S.Tighe, N.Sing, D.Fahey, J.McKenzie, S.Clouston

== Awards ==
- The J. J. Liston Trophy was won by Alex Woodward (Box Hill), who polled 20 votes. Woodward finished ahead of Liam Anthony (North Ballarat), who finished second with 17 votes, and Tom Campbell (Footscray), who finished third with 15 votes.
- The Frosty Miller Medal was won jointly by Daniel Connors (Port Melbourne) and Sam Grimley (Box Hill), who each kicked 38 goals during the home-and-away season; it was the fewest goals kicked to win the VFA/VFL goalkicking since 1900, when Footscray's L. Daly won with 32 goals. Including finals, the leading goalkicker was Grimley, who finished with 45 goals to Connors' 40.
- The Fothergill–Round Medal was won by Nic Newman (Frankston).
- The Development League premiership was won by Williamstown. Williamstown 18.18 (126) defeated Box Hill 13.13 (91) in the Grand Final, played at North Port Oval on 13 September as a curtain-raiser to the seniors first preliminary final.

2014 VFL Team of the Year
B:	Adam Saad (Coburg)	Daniel Noonan (Port Melbourne)	Brad Mangan (Williamstown)
HB:	Nic Newman (Frankston)	Sam Pleming (Port Melbourne)	Luke Tynan (Port Melbourne)
C:	Ben Davies (Williamstown)	Tony Pinwill (Port Melbourne)	Jye Bolton (Werribee)
HF:	Ozgur Uysel (Coburg)	Lech Featherstone (Coburg)	Adam Marcon (Williamstown)
F:	Chris Cain (Port Melbourne)	Scott Clouston (Williamstown)	Daniel Connors (Port Melbourne)
Foll:	Nick Meese (Williamstown)	Ben Jolley (Williamstown)	Nick Lower (Footscray)
Int:	David Mirra (Box Hill)	Nick Rippon (North Ballarat)	Ben Cavarra (Frankston)
Int:	Tom Gribble (Werribee)	Tom O'Sullivan (Port Melbourne)	Jarred Moore (Werribee)
Coach:	Andy Collins (Williamstown)		

== See also ==
- List of VFA/VFL premiers
- Australian rules football
- Victorian Football League
- Australian Football League
- 2014 AFL season
