= Cooper Whyte =

Australian rules footballer (born 2002)

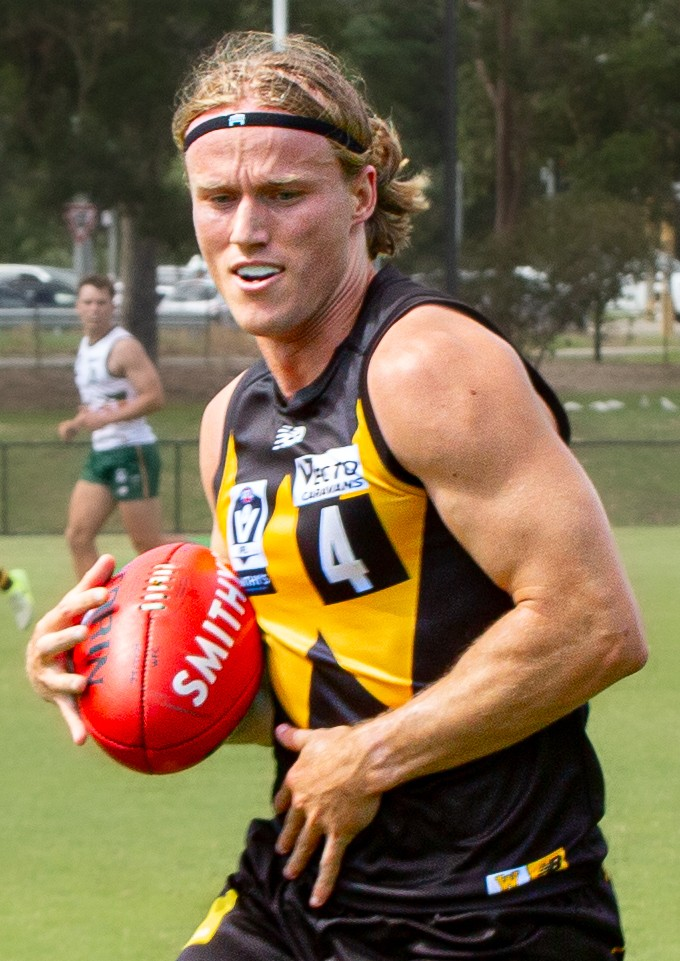
- Whyte playing for Werribee in 2026

Personal information
- Full name: Cooper Whyte
- Born: 24 February 2003 (age 23)
- Original team: Geelong Falcons / Grovedale College
- Draft: No. 64, 2021 national draft
- Debut: Round 2, 2021, Geelong vs. Carlton, at the MCG
- Height: 181 cm (5 ft 11 in)
- Weight: 81 kg (179 lb)
- Position: Defender

Club information
- Current club: Geelong
- Number: 11

Playing career^{1}
Years	Club	Games (Goals)
2023	Geelong	1 (0)
- ^{1} Playing statistics correct to the end of 2023.

Career highlights
- VFL premiership player: 2024

Cooper Whyte (born 24 February 2003) is an Australian rules footballer who currently plays for the Werribee Football Club in the Victorian Football League (VFL). He previously played for Geelong in the Australian Football League (AFL).

Whyte was selected with pick 64 in the 2021 AFL draft. Whyte made his AFL debut in round 2 of the 2023 AFL season against Carlton as the tactical sub.

== Career ==
=== Juniors ===
Educated at Grovedale College, Whyte played both Australian rules football and basketball during his junior career, spending three years as part of the Geelong Supercats program. In 2021, he would finish as runner-up in the Geelong Falcons best-and-fairest, behind fellow future Geelong draftee Mitch Knevitt. Before being drafted by Geelong, Whyte was a Collingwood supporter.

Described as a swift midfielder with a long left foot kick, Whyte was identified by AFL recruiters ahead of the 2021 AFL draft, eventually being selected by Geelong with pick 64.

=== AFL ===
A groin injury kept Whyte out of the Geelong team during much of the 2022 AFL season, restricted to just the first four games playing with Geelong's VFL team. After impressing during preseason training ahead of the 2023 AFL season, Whyte made his AFL debut for Geelong, coming off the interchange bench as the tactical sub for the last quarter in Geelong's round 2 loss against Carlton.

Whyte was delisted by Geelong at the conclusion of the 2023 season.

=== VFL ===
Whyte became a VFL premiership player in 2024, playing for Werribee in a six-point grand final victory over Southport.
