= 2024 VFL season =

142nd season of the Victorian Football League

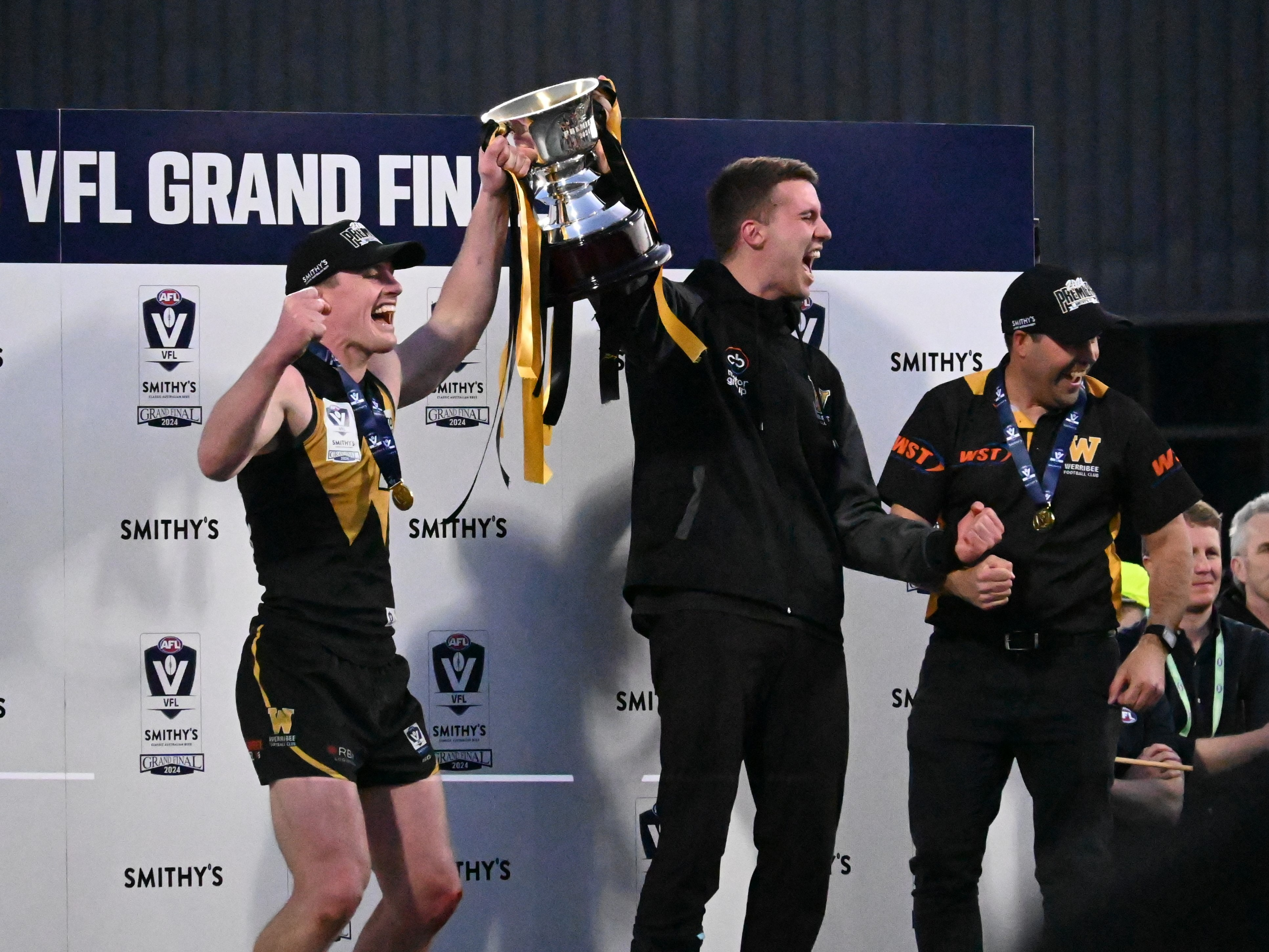
- Werribee celebrates with the premiership cup
- Date: 22 March − 22 September 2024
- Teams: 21
- Premiers: Werribee; 2nd premiership
- Runners-up: Southport; 2nd runners-up result
- Minor premiers: Werribee; 5th minor premiership
- J. J. Liston Trophy: Dom Brew (Werribee – 31 votes)
- Frosty Miller Medallist: Billy Gowers (Port Melbourne – 50 goals)

The 2024 VFL season was the 142nd season of the Victorian Football League (VFL), a second-tier Australian rules football competition played in the states of Victoria, New South Wales, and Queensland. The season began on 22 March and concluded on 22 September, comprising an 18-match home-and-away season over 21 rounds, followed by a five-week finals series.

Werribee won the premiership for the second time, defeating Southport by six points in the 2024 VFL Grand Final.

== Background ==
Following the conclusion of the 2023 season, there was speculation that AFL clubs Port Adelaide and West Coast might withdraw their reserves teams from their local competitions (the SANFL and WAFL respectively) to join the VFL. Although neither team ultimately joined for 2024, Port Adelaide formally applied in December 2023 to join the VFL from 2025.

== Clubs ==
=== Coach appointments ===
New coach	Club	Date of appointment	Previous coach	Ref
Rohan Welsh	Northern Bullants	18 September 2023	Brodie Holland	
Jackson Kornberg	Frankston	17 October 2023	Danny Ryan	
Blake Caracella	Essendon	27 October 2023	Leigh Tudor	
Jimmy Allan	Werribee	11 November 2023	Michael Barlow	

=== Club leadership ===
Club	Coach	Leadership group			Ref
Club	Coach	Captain(s)	Vice-captain(s)	Other leader(s)	Ref
Box Hill	Zane Littlejohn	Callum Porter	Stu Horner	Max Hall, James Parsons, Ed Phillips	
Brisbane	Ben Hudson				
Carlton	Luke Power	Lachie Young, Lachie Swaney			
Casey	Taylor Whitford	Mitch White			
Coburg	Jamie Cassidy-McNamara	Jesse Corigliano	Flynn Gentile		
Collingwood	Josh Fraser	Campbell Lane, Sam Glover		Kaden Schreiber, Jedd Longmire, Tom Wilson	
Essendon	Blake Caracella	Xavier O'Neill			
Footscray	Stewart Edge	Josh Chatfield	Dan Orgill	Cooper Craig-Peters, Jarrod Gilbee, Trent Bianco	
Frankston	Jackson Kornberg	Trent Mynott	Joe Lloyd, George Grey	Jackson Voss, Tom Murphy, Noah Gown, Taine Barlow	
Geelong	Mark Corrigan	Dan Capiron	Brayden Ham	Bailey van de Heuvel, Marcus Herbert	
Gold Coast	Tate Kaeslar				
Greater Western Sydney	Wayne Cripps	Ryan Hebron			
North Melbourne	Tom Lynch	Jack Watkins		Louis Butler, Connor Downie, Sam Lowson	
Northern Bullants	Rohan Welsh	Matthew King, Liam Mackie			
Port Melbourne	Adam Skrobalak	Harvey Hooper	Tom Hird, Anthony Anastasio	Tom Highmore, Matt Signorello	
Richmond	Steven Morris	Lachlan Street	Mutaz El Nour, Joel Garner, Chad Harris		
Sandringham	Jake Batchelor	Anthony Seaton, Darby Hipwell	Hugo Hall-Kahan	Oliver Lowe, Vincent Zagari	
Southport	Steve Daniel	Jacob Dawson, Brayden Crossley	Mackenzie Willis, Zac Foot, Matt Shannon		
Sydney	Damian Truslove	AFL-listed player rotation			
Werribee	James Allan	Nick Coughlan	Dom Brew	Jack Henderson, Nick Hayes, Louis Pinnuck, Kye Declase, Jesse Clark, Angus Hicks	
Williamstown	Justin Plapp	Cameron Polson	Tom Downie (vc), Finbar O'Dwyer (dvc)		

== Home-and-away season ==
=== Round 1 ===
	Round 1
Friday, 22 March (4:05pm)	Sandringham 7.13 (55)	def. by	Collingwood 12.11 (83)	RSEA Park	Report
Friday, 22 March (7:35pm)	Frankston 8.11 (59)	def. by	Williamstown 12.8 (80)	Kinetic Stadium	Report
Saturday, 23 March (11:05am)	Gold Coast 7.11 (53)	def. by	Richmond 11.10 (76)	Heritage Bank Stadium	Report
Saturday, 23 March (12:05pm)	Southport 15.7 (97)	def.	Port Melbourne 7.9 (51)	Fankhauser Reserve	Report
Saturday, 23 March (1:05pm)	Essendon 9.8 (62)	def. by	Brisbane 15.9 (99)	NEC Hangar	Report
Saturday, 23 March (2:05pm)	Geelong 7.8 (50)	def. by	Werribee 16.7 (103)	GMHBA Stadium	Report
Saturday, 23 March (3:05pm)	North Melbourne 11.15 (81)	def.	Northern Bullants 6.6 (42)	Arden Street Oval	Report
Sunday, 24 March (12:05pm)	Sydney 12.10 (82)	def.	Coburg 5.11 (41)	Tramway Oval	Report
Sunday, 24 March (12:05pm)	Footscray 14.14 (98)	def.	Greater Western Sydney 12.9 (81)	Mission Whitten Oval	Report
Sunday, 24 March (2:00pm)	Casey 6.10 (46)	def. by	Box Hill 12.15 (87)	Casey Fields	Report
	Bye; Carlton

=== Round 2 ===
	Round 2
Friday, 29 March (12:05pm)	Brisbane 16.9 (105)	def.	Collingwood 16.7 (103)	Brighton Homes Arena	Report
Friday, 29 March (12:30pm)	North Melbourne 13.12 (90)	def.	Carlton 10.14 (74)	Arden Street Oval	Report
Friday, 29 March (2:30pm)	Coburg 11.11 (77)	def. by	Williamstown 12.11 (83)	Highgate Recreation Reserve	Report
Friday, 29 March (3:05pm)	Port Melbourne 11.5 (71)	def. by	Frankston 13.18 (96)	ETU Stadium (crowd: 1,500)	Report
Saturday, 30 March (11:05am)	Geelong 11.11 (77)	def. by	Box Hill 16.15 (111)	GMHBA Stadium	Report
Saturday, 30 March (1:05pm)	Southport 8.11 (59)	def. by	Werribee 9.8 (62)	Fankhauser Reserve	Report
Saturday, 30 March (2:05pm)	Casey 12.13 (85)	def. by	Footscray 15.9 (99)	Casey Fields	Report
Sunday, 31 March (12:05pm)	Richmond 13.6 (84)	def.	Sydney 10.12 (72)	Swinburne Centre	Report
Sunday, 31 March (2:05pm)	Sandringham 17.13 (115)	def.	Essendon 11.11 (77)	Trevor Barker Beach Oval	Report
	Bye; Gold Coast, Greater Western Sydney, Northern Bullants
Coburg's match against Williamstown was moved to Highgate Recreation Reserve in Craigieburn due to turf upgrade work at Piranha Park.

=== Round 3 ===
	Round 3
Friday, 12 April (4:05pm)	Footscray 16.18 (114)	def.	Essendon 12.8 (80)	Marvel Stadium	Report
Saturday, 13 April (10:05am)	Greater Western Sydney 19.11 (125)	def.	Sandringham 12.7 (79)	Manuka Oval	Report
Saturday, 13 April (12:05pm)	Williamstown 17.10 (112)	def.	Southport 8.18 (66)	DSV Stadium	Report
Saturday, 13 April (2:05pm)	Werribee 11.7 (73)	def.	Richmond 7.10 (52)	Avalon Airport Oval	Report
Saturday, 13 April (2:05pm)	Port Melbourne 11.9 (75)	def. by	Casey 13.12 (90)	Kinetic Stadium	Report
Saturday, 13 April (2:30pm)	Gold Coast 13.10 (88)	def.	Box Hill 6.9 (45)	People First Stadium	Report
Sunday, 14 April (1:05pm)	North Melbourne 12.4 (76)	def.	Brisbane 9.21 (75)	Arden Street Oval	Report
Sunday, 14 April (2:05pm)	Carlton 12.10 (82)	def. by	Collingwood 12.11 (83)	Ikon Park	Report
Sunday, 14 April (2:05pm)	Northern Bullants 5.6 (36)	def. by	Geelong 12.17 (89)	Genis Steel Oval	Report
	Bye; Coburg, Frankston, Sydney

=== Round 4 ===
	Round 4
Friday, 19 April (7:35pm)	Frankston 11.19 (85)	def.	Northern Bullants 4.10 (34)	Kinetic Stadium	Report
Saturday, 20 April (11:40am)	Essendon 8.10 (58)	def. by	Southport 7.17 (59)	NEC Hangar	Report
Saturday, 20 April (12:05pm)	Werribee 14.14 (98)	def. by	Greater Western Sydney 16.10 (106)	Avalon Airport Oval	Report
Saturday, 20 April (1:05pm)	Brisbane 9.10 (64)	def. by	Geelong 9.13 (67)	Brighton Homes Arena	Report
Saturday, 20 April (2:05pm)	Box Hill 20.11 (131)	def.	North Melbourne 10.11 (71)	Fenjiu Stadium (crowd: 1,485)	Report
Saturday, 20 April (3:05pm)	Williamstown 6.5 (41)	def. by	Footscray 12.12 (84)	DSV Stadium	Report
Sunday, 21 April (9:05am)	Sydney 8.12 (60)	drew with	Gold Coast 9.6 (60)	SCG	Report
Sunday, 21 April (1:05pm)	Coburg 12.15 (87)	def.	Collingwood 10.12 (72)	Piranha Park	Report
Sunday, 21 April (2:05pm)	Carlton 16.15 (111)	def.	Port Melbourne 14.7 (91)	Ikon Park	Report
	Bye; Casey, Richmond, Sandringham
Coburg's win against Collingwood was its first since round 19 of the 2022 season, ending a 23-match losing streak.

=== Round 5 ===
	Round 5
Wednesday, 24 April (2:05pm)	Richmond 15.5 (95)	def.	Casey 11.9 (75)	Swinburne Centre	Report
Thursday, 25 April (1:05pm)	Williamstown 15.11 (101)	def.	Werribee 7.7 (49)	DSV Stadium	Report
Friday, 26 April (7:05pm)	Greater Western Sydney 13.16 (94)	def.	North Melbourne 9.13 (67)	Blacktown ISP Oval	Report
Friday, 26 April (7:35pm)	Frankston 11.10 (76)	def.	Coburg 8.11 (59)	Kinetic Stadium	Report
Saturday, 27 April (11:05am)	Port Melbourne 13.7 (85)	def. by	Gold Coast 12.18 (90)	ETU Stadium	Report
Saturday, 27 April (12:05pm)	Carlton 8.7 (55)	def. by	Geelong 23.18 (156)	Ikon Park	Report
Saturday, 27 April (1:05pm)	Southport 13.8 (86)	def. by	Brisbane 14.11 (95)	Fankhauser Reserve	Report
Saturday, 27 April (2:05pm)	Sandringham 12.15 (87)	def.	Northern Bullants 3.12 (30)	Trevor Barker Beach Oval	Report
Saturday, 27 April (2:05pm)	Collingwood 11.19 (85)	def. by	Essendon 13.19 (97)	Victoria Park	Report
Sunday, 28 April (12:05pm)	Box Hill 15.12 (102)	def.	Sydney 11.9 (75)	Fenjiu Stadium (crowd: 1,534)	Report
	Bye; Footscray

=== Round 6 ===
	Round 6
Saturday, 4 May (12:05pm)	Southport 14.17 (101)	def.	Collingwood 11.8 (74)	Fankhauser Reserve	Report
Saturday, 4 May (1:05pm)	Coburg 9.7 (61)	def. by	Richmond 13.15 (93)	Piranha Park	Report
Saturday, 4 May (2:05pm)	Werribee 14.10 (94)	def.	Carlton 9.8 (62)	Avalon Airport Oval	Report
Saturday, 4 May (2:05pm)	Northern Bullants 9.10 (64)	def. by	Port Melbourne 15.8 (98)	Genis Steel Oval	Report
Saturday, 4 May (5:15pm)	Sydney 12.13 (85)	def.	Greater Western Sydney 11.9 (75)	SCG	Report
Sunday, 5 May (11:05am)	Footscray 10.13 (73)	def.	Box Hill 9.6 (60)	Mission Whitten Oval	Report
Sunday, 5 May (12:05pm)	Brisbane 11.5 (71)	def. by	Gold Coast 24.13 (157)	Brighton Homes Arena	Report
Sunday, 5 May (1:05pm)	Geelong 18.5 (113)	def.	Frankston 6.13 (49)	GMHBA Stadium	Report
Sunday, 5 May (2:05pm)	Sandringham 14.15 (99)	def.	North Melbourne 14.12 (96)	Trevor Barker Beach Oval	Report
Sunday, 5 May (2:05pm)	Casey 10.8 (68)	def. by	Williamstown 15.10 (100)	Casey Fields	Report
	Bye; Essendon

=== Round 7 ===
	Round 7
Friday, 10 May (5:10pm)	Carlton 9.12 (66)	def. by	Casey 9.15 (69)	Ikon Park	Report
Friday, 10 May (7:35pm)	Port Melbourne 14.10 (94)	def.	Coburg 9.8 (62)	ETU Stadium	Report
Saturday, 11 May (11:05am)	Greater Western Sydney 5.17 (47)	def. by	Frankston 7.19 (61)	Blacktown ISP Oval	Report
Saturday, 11 May (12:05pm)	North Melbourne 12.8 (80)	def. by	Sydney 12.14 (86)	Arden Street Oval	Report
Saturday, 11 May (2:05pm)	Northern Bullants 7.13 (55)	def.	Collingwood 6.12 (48)	Genis Steel Oval	Report
Saturday, 11 May (3:05pm)	Williamstown 13.12 (90)	def.	Essendon 11.13 (79)	DSV Stadium	Report
Sunday, 12 May (1:05pm)	Gold Coast 8.10 (58)	def. by	Southport 16.9 (105)	People First Stadium	Report
Sunday, 12 May (2:05pm)	Richmond 13.7 (85)	def. by	Footscray 17.14 (116)	Swinburne Centre	Report
Sunday, 12 May (2:05pm)	Box Hill 13.9 (87)	def.	Sandringham 11.16 (82)	Wonthaggi Recreation Reserve	Report
	Bye; Brisbane, Geelong, Werribee

=== Round 8 ===
	Round 8
Friday, 17 May (7:35pm)	Frankston 9.11 (65)	def.	Sydney 7.8 (50)	Kinetic Stadium	Report
Saturday, 18 May (11:05am)	Collingwood 6.12 (48)	def. by	Werribee 15.10 (100)	Victoria Park	Report
Saturday, 18 May (11:05am)	Greater Western Sydney 9.10 (64)	def. by	Footscray 16.13 (109)	Blacktown ISP Oval	Report
Saturday, 18 May (11:05am)	Casey 8.9 (57)	def. by	Brisbane 8.16 (64)	Casey Fields	Report
Saturday, 18 May (12:05pm)	Northern Bullants 10.9 (69)	def. by	Southport 18.17 (125)	Genis Steel Oval	Report
Saturday, 18 May (1:05pm)	Coburg 10.6 (66)	def. by	Geelong 13.10 (88)	Piranha Park	Report
Saturday, 18 May (3:05pm)	Williamstown 13.10 (88)	def.	Carlton 12.11 (83)	DSV Stadium	Report
Sunday, 19 May (12:00pm)	Sandringham 20.14 (134)	def.	Richmond 3.6 (24)	Trevor Barker Beach Oval	Report
Sunday, 19 May (2:30pm)	Essendon 15.9 (99)	def.	North Melbourne 6.12 (48)	Windy Hill	Report
	Bye; Box Hill, Gold Coast, Port Melbourne

=== Round 9 ===
	Round 9
Friday, 24 May (12:05pm)	Sydney 11.13 (79)	def.	Northern Bullants 9.4 (58)	Tramway Oval	Report
Saturday, 25 May (10:25am)	Carlton 7.10 (52)	def. by	Gold Coast 15.12 (102)	Ikon Park	Report
Saturday, 25 May (12:05pm)	Geelong 16.14 (110)	def.	Greater Western Sydney 7.7 (49)	GMHBA Stadium	Report
Saturday, 25 May (12:05pm)	Footscray 14.9 (93)	def.	Port Melbourne 11.15 (81)	Mission Whitten Oval	Report
Saturday, 25 May (12:05pm)	Southport 16.9 (105)	def.	Frankston 8.9 (57)	Fankhauser Reserve	Report
Saturday, 25 May (1:05pm)	Box Hill 4.10 (34)	def. by	Brisbane 15.12 (102)	Fenjiu Stadium (crowd: 866)	Report
Saturday, 25 May (2:35pm)	Richmond 20.7 (127)	def.	Essendon 10.6 (66)	MCG	Report
Sunday, 26 May (12:00pm)	Werribee 13.21 (99)	def.	North Melbourne 4.6 (30)	Avalon Airport Oval	Report
Sunday, 26 May (2:05pm)	Casey 14.14 (98)	def. by	Sandringham 17.9 (111)	Casey Fields	Report
	Bye; Coburg, Collingwood, Williamstown

=== Round 10 ===
	Round 10
Friday, 31 May (4:05pm)	Collingwood 8.11 (59)	def. by	Footscray 14.13 (97)	Marvel Stadium	Report
Saturday, 1 June (1:05pm)	Coburg 16.12 (108)	def.	Casey 12.10 (82)	Piranha Park	Report
Saturday, 1 June (3:30pm)	Geelong 11.11 (77)	def.	Richmond 8.12 (60)	GMHBA Stadium	Report
Saturday, 1 June (7:05pm)	Frankston 7.12 (54)	def. by	Sandringham 8.7 (55)	Kinetic Stadium	Report
Sunday, 2 June (12:15pm)	Gold Coast 11.7 (73)	def. by	Werribee 13.12 (90)	People First Stadium	Report
Sunday, 2 June (1:05pm)	Essendon 5.10 (40)	def. by	Box Hill 16.16 (112)	Windy Hill	Report
Sunday, 2 June (2:05pm)	Northern Bullants 14.11 (95)	def.	Carlton 11.17 (83)	Genis Steel Oval	Report
Sunday, 2 June (2:05pm)	Port Melbourne 20.9 (129)	def.	Williamstown 10.9 (69)	ETU Stadium (crowd: 1,247)	Report
	Bye; Brisbane, Greater Western Sydney, North Melbourne, Southport, Sydney

=== Round 11 ===
	Round 11
Friday, 7 June (3:05pm)	Footscray 14.11 (95)	def. by	Brisbane 17.11 (113)	Mission Whitten Oval	Report
Friday, 7 June (7:35pm)	Port Melbourne 4.15 (39)	def. by	Richmond 13.10 (88)	ETU Stadium	Report
Saturday, 8 June (11:05am)	Southport 13.13 (91)	def.	Williamstown 7.4 (46)	Fankhauser Reserve	Report
Saturday, 8 June (12:05pm)	North Melbourne 9.12 (66)	def.	Coburg 9.6 (60)	Arden Street Oval	Report
Saturday, 8 June (12:05pm)	Sandringham 12.10 (82)	drew with	Gold Coast 11.16 (82)	RSEA Park	Report
Saturday, 8 June (2:05pm)	Werribee 13.9 (87)	def.	Frankston 8.11 (59)	Avalon Airport Oval	Report
Sunday, 9 June (11:35am)	Sydney 10.14 (74)	def. by	Geelong 12.11 (83)	SCG	Report
Sunday, 9 June (2:05pm)	Essendon 16.8 (104)	def.	Carlton 16.5 (101)	Windy Hill	Report
Sunday, 9 June (2:05pm)	Box Hill 20.8 (128)	def.	Greater Western Sydney 8.12 (60)	Fenjiu Stadium (crowd: 2,008)	Report
Sunday, 9 June (2:05pm)	Casey 18.14 (122)	def.	Collingwood 11.4 (70)	Casey Fields	Report
	Bye; Northern Bullants

=== Round 12 ===
	Round 12
Saturday, 15 June (11:05am)	Brisbane 19.16 (130)	def.	Sandringham 10.13 (73)	Brighton Homes Arena	Report
Saturday, 15 June (11:05am)	Footscray 8.8 (56)	def. by	Sydney 12.11 (83)	Mission Whitten Oval	Report
Saturday, 15 June (12:05pm)	Richmond 6.14 (87)	def. by	Box Hill 13.9 (87)	Swinburne Centre	Report
Sunday, 16 June (11:05am)	Collingwood 12.7 (79)	def. by	North Melbourne 18.12 (120)	AIA Centre	Report
Sunday, 16 June (11:05am)	Greater Western Sydney 9.17 (71)	def.	Port Melbourne 8.9 (57)	Blacktown ISP Oval	Report
Sunday, 16 June (12:05pm)	Coburg 6.11 (47)	def. by	Southport 8.10 (58)	Piranha Park	Report
Sunday, 16 June (2:05pm)	Williamstown 12.13 (85)	def.	Northern Bullants 8.12 (60)	DSV Stadium	Report
	Bye; Carlton, Casey, Essendon, Frankston, Geelong, Gold Coast, Werribee

=== Round 13 ===
	Round 13
Saturday, 22 June (11:05am)	Gold Coast 16.15 (111)	def.	Essendon 14.9 (93)	People First Stadium	Report
Saturday, 22 June (11:05am)	Brisbane 18.8 (116)	def.	Frankston 9.12 (66)	Brighton Homes Arena	Report
Saturday, 22 June (12:05pm)	Carlton 10.11 (71)	def. by	Southport 11.17 (83)	Ikon Park	Report
Saturday, 22 June (12:45pm)	Greater Western Sydney 12.18 (90)	def.	Sydney 11.10 (76)	Engie Stadium	Report
Saturday, 22 June (2:05pm)	Werribee 12.11 (83)	def.	Williamstown 9.9 (63)	Avalon Airport Oval	Report
Sunday, 23 June (1:05pm)	Coburg 10.12 (72)	def.	Northern Bullants 8.11 (59)	Piranha Park	Report
Sunday, 23 June (2:05pm)	Casey 11.11 (77)	def. by	North Melbourne 12.11 (83)	Casey Fields	Report
Sunday, 23 June (2:05pm)	Port Melbourne 13.10 (88)	def.	Geelong 12.14 (86)	ETU Stadium	Report
	Bye; Box Hill, Collingwood, Footscray, Richmond, Sandringham

=== Round 14 ===
	Round 14
Saturday, 29 June (11:05am)	Southport 13.7 (85)	def. by	Greater Western Sydney 17.10 (112)	Fankhauser Reserve	Report
Saturday, 29 June (12:05pm)	Brisbane 18.11 (119)	def.	Coburg 10.11 (71)	Brighton Homes Arena	Report
Saturday, 29 June (12:05pm)	Frankston 6.11 (47)	def. by	Gold Coast 12.8 (80)	Kinetic Stadium	Report
Saturday, 29 June (1:05pm)	Northern Bullants 7.5 (47)	def. by	Casey 10.15 (75)	Genis Steel Oval	Report
Saturday, 29 June (1:05pm)	Essendon 14.14 (98)	def.	Collingwood 9.9 (63)	Windy Hill	Report
Saturday, 29 June (2:05pm)	North Melbourne 10.3 (63)	def. by	Footscray 14.13 (97)	Arden Street Oval	Report
Saturday, 29 June (2:05pm)	Box Hill 9.10 (64)	def. by	Port Melbourne 10.11 (71)	Fenjiu Stadium (crowd: 857)	Report
Sunday, 30 June (12:00pm)	Richmond 16.9 (105)	def.	Carlton 10.9 (69)	Swinburne Centre	Report
Sunday, 30 June (12:05pm)	Sydney 5.15 (45)	def. by	Werribee 9.5 (59)	Tramway Oval	Report
Sunday, 30 June (12:05pm)	Geelong 13.10 (88)	def.	Sandringham 11.7 (73)	GMHBA Stadium	Report
	Bye; Williamstown

=== Round 15 ===
	Round 15
Saturday, 6 July (11:05am)	Gold Coast 11.18 (84)	def.	Williamstown 8.9 (57)	People First Stadium	Report
Saturday, 6 July (1:05pm)	Greater Western Sydney 14.9 (93)	def. by	Carlton 17.12 (114)	Blacktown ISP Oval	Report
Saturday, 6 July (1:05pm)	Brisbane 18.15 (123)	def.	Casey 11.11 (77)	Brighton Homes Arena	Report
Saturday, 6 July (2:05pm)	Werribee 10.9 (69)	def.	Footscray 7.4 (46)	Avalon Airport Oval	Report
Saturday, 6 July (2:05pm)	Port Melbourne 11.15 (81)	def. by	Essendon 16.11 (107)	ETU Stadium	Report
Sunday, 7 July (11:05am)	Sandringham 10.8 (68)	def. by	Sydney 11.9 (75)	RSEA Park	Report
Sunday, 7 July (1:05pm)	Frankston 13.16 (94)	def.	Collingwood 11.9 (75)	Kinetic Stadium (crowd: 3,587)	Report
Sunday, 7 July (2:05pm)	Box Hill 10.12 (72)	def.	Geelong 10.11 (71)	Fenjiu Stadium (crowd: 1,506)	Report
Sunday, 7 July (2:05pm)	Northern Bullants 5.9 (39)	def. by	Richmond 21.8 (134)	Genis Steel Oval	Report
	Bye; Coburg, North Melbourne, Southport

=== Round 16 ===
	Round 16
Saturday, 13 July (10:05am)	Sydney 12.7 (79)	def. by	North Melbourne 13.6 (84)	Tramway Oval	Report
Saturday, 13 July (12:05pm)	Southport 16.11 (107)	def.	Box Hill 7.12 (54)	Fankhauser Reserve	Report
Saturday, 13 July (1:05pm)	Werribee 19.16 (130)	def.	Coburg 7.9 (51)	Avalon Airport Oval	Report
Saturday, 13 July (1:05pm)	Collingwood 11.8 (74)	def. by	Geelong 15.13 (103)	AIA Centre	Report
Saturday, 13 July (2:05pm)	Northern Bullants 10.4 (64)	def. by	Frankston 13.14 (92)	Genis Steel Oval	Report
Saturday, 13 July (3:05pm)	Williamstown 12.11 (83)	def.	Sandringham 9.9 (63)	DSV Stadium	Report
Sunday, 14 July (11:05am)	Richmond 15.6 (96)	def.	Gold Coast 11.4 (70)	Swinburne Centre	Report
Sunday, 14 July (12:00pm)	Footscray 13.10 (88)	def.	Carlton 12.7 (79)	Mission Whitten Oval	Report
Sunday, 14 July (1:05pm)	Casey 13.12 (90)	def.	Essendon 10.8 (68)	Casey Fields	Report
	Bye; Brisbane, Greater Western Sydney, Port Melbourne
Collingwood's game against Geelong was moved from Victoria Park to AIA Centre following a ground inspection after heavy rain.

=== Round 17 ===
	Round 17
Saturday, 20 July (9:35am)	Greater Western Sydney 11.12 (78)	def.	Gold Coast 6.15 (51)	Blacktown ISP Oval	Report
Saturday, 20 July (12:05pm)	Brisbane 15.7 (97)	def.	Sydney 13.14 (92)	Brighton Homes Arena	Report
Saturday, 20 July (1:05pm)	Frankston 10.8 (68)	def.	Casey 5.11 (41)	Kinetic Stadium	Report
Saturday, 20 July (1:05pm)	Sandringham 8.12 (60)	def.	Southport 8.11 (59)	Trevor Barker Beach Oval	Report
Saturday, 20 July (2:05pm)	North Melbourne 5.16 (46)	def. by	Box Hill 8.12 (60)	Arden Street Oval	Report
Saturday, 20 July (2:05pm)	Werribee 15.13 (103)	def.	Northern Bullants 7.7 (49)	Avalon Airport Oval	Report
Saturday, 20 July (3:40pm)	Geelong 8.9 (57)	drew with	Footscray 8.9 (57)	GMHBA Stadium	Report
Saturday, 20 July (5:05pm)	Williamstown 8.10 (58)	def.	Richmond 5.6 (36)	DSV Stadium	Report
Sunday, 21 July (11:05am)	Collingwood 7.8 (50)	def. by	Carlton 20.13 (133)	Ikon Park	Report
Sunday, 21 July (2:05pm)	Coburg 11.9 (75)	def.	Port Melbourne 10.10 (70)	Piranha Park	Report
	Bye; Essendon

=== Round 18 ===
	Round 18
Saturday, 27 July (11:35am)	Casey 6.15 (51)	def. by	Greater Western Sydney 9.4 (58)	Casey Fields	Report
Saturday, 27 July (12:05pm)	Southport 10.8 (68)	def. by	Sydney 14.9 (93)	Fankhauser Reserve	Report
Saturday, 27 July (12:50pm)	Gold Coast 20.11 (131)	def.	Brisbane 14.12 (96)	People First Stadium	Report
Saturday, 27 July (1:05pm)	North Melbourne 7.9 (51)	def. by	Geelong 10.12 (72)	Arden Street Oval	Report
Saturday, 27 July (2:05pm)	Port Melbourne 7.7 (49)	def. by	Werribee 11.10 (76)	ETU Stadium	Report
Sunday, 28 July (10:05am)	Collingwood 9.10 (64)	def.	Richmond 7.11 (53)	Victoria Park	Report
Sunday, 28 July (1:05pm)	Coburg 5.11 (41)	def. by	Frankston 9.15 (69)	Piranha Park	Report
Sunday, 28 July (1:05pm)	Essendon 9.13 (67)	def.	Sandringham 9.8 (62)	Windy Hill	Report
Sunday, 28 July (12:00pm)	Box Hill 13.12 (90)	def.	Williamstown 10.8 (68)	Fenjiu Stadium (crowd: 713)	Report
	Bye; Carlton, Footscray, Northern Bullants

=== Round 19 ===
	Round 19
Friday, 2 August (3:05pm)	Footscray 19.10 (124)	def.	Casey 10.8 (68)	Mission Whitten Oval	Report
Friday, 2 August (7:35pm)	Frankston 17.10 (112)	def.	Port Melbourne 13.7 (85)	Kinetic Stadium	Report
Saturday, 3 August (11:05am)	Gold Coast 16.12 (108)	def.	Coburg 11.8 (74)	People First Stadium	Report
Saturday, 3 August (11:05am)	Carlton 10.11 (71)	def. by	Brisbane 14.10 (94)	Ikon Park	Report
Saturday, 3 August (12:05pm)	Werribee 8.7 (55)	def. by	Southport 8.13 (61)	Avalon Airport Oval	Report
Saturday, 3 August (2:05pm)	Northern Bullants 12.5 (77)	def. by	Essendon 18.13 (121)	Genis Steel Oval	Report
Sunday, 4 August (11:05am)	Greater Western Sydney 10.17 (77)	def. by	Box Hill 11.12 (78)	Blacktown ISP Oval	Report
Sunday, 4 August (12:00pm)	Williamstown 9.13 (67)	def. by	North Melbourne 11.9 (75)	DSV Stadium	Report
	Bye; Collingwood, Geelong, Richmond, Sandringham, Sydney

=== Round 20 ===
	Round 20
Friday, 9 August (3:05pm)	Sydney 11.8 (74)	def.	Collingwood 6.9 (45)	Tramway Oval	Report
Saturday, 10 August (12:05pm)	Geelong 11.12 (78)	def. by	Carlton 16.5 (101)	GMHBA Stadium	Report
Saturday, 10 August (1:05pm)	Essendon 11.25 (91)	def.	Gold Coast 11.13 (79)	Windy Hill	Report
Sunday, 11 August (11:05am)	Brisbane 19.8 (122)	def.	Greater Western Sydney 10.12 (72)	Brighton Homes Arena	Report
Sunday, 11 August (11:05am)	Richmond 10.11 (71)	def. by	Sandringham 15.14 (104)	Swinburne Centre	Report
Sunday, 11 August (12:00pm)	Frankston 11.8 (74)	def. by	Footscray 16.5 (101)	Kinetic Stadium	Report
Sunday, 11 August (2:05pm)	Northern Bullants 13.10 (88)	def. by	Coburg 13.13 (91)	Genis Steel Oval	Report
	Bye; Box Hill, Casey, North Melbourne, Port Melbourne, Southport, Werribee, Williamstown

=== Round 21 ===
	Round 21
Saturday, 17 August (10:00am)	Gold Coast 27.13 (175)	def.	Casey 13.9 (87)	People First Stadium	Report
Saturday, 17 August (11:05am)	Sydney 10.10 (70)	def. by	Footscray 16.11 (107)	Tramway Oval	Report
Saturday, 17 August (12:05pm)	Williamstown 17.11 (113)	def.	Greater Western Sydney 12.15 (87)	DSV Stadium	Report
Saturday, 17 August (12:05pm)	Southport 14.16 (100)	def.	North Melbourne 12.11 (83)	Fankhauser Reserve	Report
Sunday, 17 August (12:05pm)	Collingwood 11.11 (77)	def.	Brisbane 10.9 (69)	AIA Centre	Report
Saturday, 17 August (2:05pm)	Port Melbourne 13.9 (87)	def.	Northern Bullants 9.6 (60)	ETU Stadium	Report
Sunday, 18 August (11:05am)	Carlton 12.13 (85)	def. by	Richmond 14.10 (94)	Ikon Park	Report
Sunday, 18 August (12:00pm)	Sandringham 8.11 (59)	def. by	Geelong 10.12 (72)	Trevor Barker Beach Oval	Report
Sunday, 18 August (1:05pm)	Coburg 11.7 (73)	def. by	Essendon 16.15 (111)	Piranha Park	Report
Sunday, 18 August (2:05pm)	Box Hill 9.9 (63)	def. by	Werribee 10.14 (74)	Fenjiu Stadium (crowd: 739)	Report
	Bye; Frankston

== Ladder ==
Pos	Team	Pld	W	L	D	PF	PA	PP	Pts	Qualification
1	Werribee (P)	18	15	3	0	1504	1067	141.0	60	Finals series
2	Footscray (R)	18	14	3	1	1654	1312	126.1	58	Finals series
3	Brisbane (R)	18	13	5	0	1754	1467	119.6	52	Finals series
4	Geelong (R)	18	12	5	1	1537	1242	123.8	50	Finals series
5	Southport	18	12	6	0	1515	1257	120.5	48	Finals series
6	Box Hill (R)	18	12	6	0	1465	1278	114.6	48	Finals series
7	Gold Coast (R)	18	10	6	2	1652	1385	119.3	44	Finals series
8	Williamstown	18	11	7	0	1404	1363	103.0	44	Finals series
9	Richmond (R)	18	10	8	0	1423	1342	106.0	40	Finals series
10	Frankston	18	10	8	0	1283	1304	98.4	40	Finals series
11	Essendon (R)	18	9	9	0	1518	1586	95.7	36	
12	Sandringham	18	8	9	1	1461	1401	104.3	34	
13	Sydney (R)	18	8	9	1	1350	1322	102.1	34	
14	Greater Western Sydney (R)	18	8	10	0	1439	1582	91.0	32	
15	North Melbourne (R)	18	8	10	0	1310	1490	87.9	32	
16	Port Melbourne	18	6	12	0	1402	1511	92.8	24	
17	Casey (R)	18	5	13	0	1358	1621	83.8	20	
18	Coburg	18	5	13	0	1216	1548	78.6	20	
19	Carlton (R)	18	4	14	0	1492	1657	90.0	16	
20	Collingwood (R)	18	4	14	0	1252	1645	76.1	16	
21	Northern Bullants	18	2	16	0	1026	1635	62.8	8	

Source: afl.com.au
Rules for classification: 1) points; 2) percentage; 3) number of points for
(R) Reserves
(P) Premiers

== Progression by round ==
Numbers highlighted in green indicate that the team finished the round inside the top 6.
Numbers highlighted in yellow indicate that the team finished the round between 7−10 on the ladder.
Numbers highlighted in blue indicates the team finished first on the ladder in that round.
Numbers highlighted in red indicates the team finished in last place on the ladder in that round.
Underlined numbers indicate that the team had a bye during that round.

Team ╲ Round	1	2	3	4	5	6	7	8	9	10	11	12	13	14	15	16	17	18	19	20	21
Box Hill	4	8	8	12	16	16	20	20	20	24	28	32	32	32	36	36	40	44	48	48	48
Brisbane	4	8	8	8	12	12	12	16	20	20	24	28	32	36	40	40	44	44	48	52	52
Carlton	0	0	0	4	4	4	4	4	4	4	4	4	4	4	8	8	12	12	12	16	16
Casey	0	0	0	0	4	4	8	8	8	8	12	12	12	16	16	20	20	20	20	20	20
Coburg	0	0	0	4	4	4	4	4	4	8	8	8	12	12	12	12	16	16	16	20	20
Collingwood	4	4	8	8	8	8	8	8	8	8	8	8	8	8	8	8	8	12	12	12	16
Essendon	0	0	0	0	4	4	4	8	8	8	12	12	12	16	20	20	20	24	28	32	36
Footscray	4	8	12	16	16	20	24	28	32	36	36	36	36	40	40	44	46	46	50	54	58
Frankston	0	4	4	8	12	12	16	20	20	20	20	20	20	20	24	28	32	36	40	40	40
Geelong	0	0	4	8	12	16	16	20	24	28	32	32	32	36	36	40	42	46	46	46	50
Gold Coast	0	0	4	6	10	14	14	14	18	18	20	20	24	28	32	32	32	36	40	40	44
Greater Western Sydney	0	0	4	8	12	12	12	12	12	12	12	16	20	24	24	24	28	32	32	32	32
North Melbourne	4	8	12	12	12	12	12	12	12	12	16	20	24	24	24	28	28	28	32	32	32
Northern Bullants	0	0	0	0	0	0	4	4	4	8	8	8	8	8	8	8	8	8	8	8	8
Port Melbourne	0	0	0	0	0	4	8	8	8	12	12	12	16	20	20	20	20	20	20	20	24
Richmond	4	8	8	8	12	16	16	16	20	20	24	24	24	28	32	36	36	36	36	36	40
Sandringham	0	4	4	4	8	12	12	16	20	24	26	26	26	26	26	26	30	30	30	34	34
Southport	4	4	4	8	8	12	16	20	24	24	28	32	36	36	36	40	40	40	44	44	48
Sydney	4	4	4	6	6	10	14	14	18	18	18	22	22	22	26	26	26	30	30	34	34
Werribee	4	8	12	12	12	16	16	20	24	28	32	32	36	40	44	48	52	56	56	56	60
Williamstown	4	8	12	12	16	20	24	28	28	28	28	32	32	32	32	36	40	40	40	40	44

Source: AFL

== Finals series ==
Wildcard finals
24 August, People First Stadium
7	Gold Coast	14.16 (100)
10	Frankston	16.7 (103)
25 August, DSV Stadium
8	Williamstown	18.12 (120)
9	Richmond	7.12 (54)

Qualifying and elimination finals
31 August, Avalon Airport Oval
1	Werribee	8.9 (57)
4	Geelong	3.7 (25)
31 August, Fankhauser Reserve
5	Southport	30.15 (195)
Frankston	16.7 (103)
31 August, Fenjiu Stadium
6	Box Hill	7.10 (52)
Williamstown	11.14 (80)
31 August, Mission Whitten Oval
2	Footscray	12.10 (82)
3	Brisbane	12.6 (78)

Semi-finals
7 September, GMHBA Stadium
Geelong	7.16 (58)
Southport	13.9 (87)
7 September, Brighton Homes Arena
Brisbane	19.16 (130)
Williamstown	18.5 (113)

Preliminary finals
14 September, Avalon Airport Oval
Werribee	10.6 (66)
Brisbane	6.10 (46)
14 September, Mission Whitten Oval
Footscray	7.9 (51)
Southport	9.7 (61)

Grand final
22 September, Ikon Park
Werribee	10.9 (69)
Southport	8.15 (63)

All starting times are local time. Source: afl.com.au

=== Wildcard finals ===
	Wildcard finals
Saturday, 24 August (1:05 pm)	Gold Coast 14.16 (100)	def. by	Frankston 16.7 (103)	People First Stadium	Report
Sunday, 25 August (12:00 pm)	Williamstown 18.12 (120)	def.	Richmond 7.12 (54)	DSV Stadium	Report

=== Qualifying finals and elimination finals ===
	Qualifying finals
QF1: Saturday, 31 August (12:00 pm)	Werribee 8.9 (57)	def.	Geelong 5.6 (36)	Avalon Airport Oval	Report
QF2: Saturday, 31 August (1:05 pm)	Footscray 12.10 (82)	def.	Brisbane 12.6 (78)	Mission Whitten Oval	Report

	Elimination finals
EF1: Saturday, 31 August (12:05 pm)	Southport 30.15 (195)	def.	Frankston 16.7 (103)	Fankhauser Reserve	Report
EF2: Saturday, 31 August (3:00 pm)	Box Hill 7.10 (52)	def. by	Williamstown 11.14 (80)	Fenjiu Stadium (crowd: 2,650)	Report
Darcy Craven (Brisbane) had a shot at goal after the final siren to win the match against Footscray, but the ball fell short in windy conditions at Mission Whitten Oval.

=== Semi-finals ===
	Semi-finals
SF1: Saturday, 7 September (11:35 am)	Geelong 7.16 (58)	def. by	Southport 13.9 (87)	GMHBA Stadium	Report
SF2: Saturday, 7 September (12:45 pm)	Brisbane 19.16 (130)	def.	Williamstown 18.5 (113)	Brighton Homes Arena	Report

=== Preliminary finals ===
	Preliminary finals
PF1: Saturday, 14 September (11:00 am)	Werribee 10.6 (66)	def.	Brisbane 6.10 (46)	Avalon Airport Oval	Report
PF2: Saturday, 14 September (2:00 am)	Footscray 7.9 (51)	def. by	Southport 9.7 (61)	Mission Whitten Oval	Report

=== Grand Final ===
2024 VFL Grand Final
Sunday 22 September (3:10 pm)	Werribee	def.	Southport	Ikon Park (crowd: 4,500)	Report
2.2 (14); 3.2 (20); 7.5 (47); 10.9 (69)	Q1; Q2; Q3; Final	2.7 (19); 4.9 (33); 5.10 (40); 8.15 (63)	Umpires: J Howard, J Clamp, S Whetton; Norm Goss Memorial Medal: Jack Henderson; Television broadcast: Seven Network
J. Dahlhaus, J. Henderson 2 Z. Banch, H. Garoni, J. Riding, S. Paea, C. Whyte, F. Young	Goals	J. Dawson, H. Dixon, J. Lockhart 2 J. Sexton, M. Shannon
J. Henderson, D. Brew, A. Hicks, L. Pinnuck, J. Clark, A. Johnson, R. Bice, N. Cooper	Best	J. Dawson, B. Crossley, M. McGuinness, B. Woodcock, J. Edwards
Nil	Injuries	Nil
Nil	Reports	Nil
Jack Henderson polled 11 votes out of a possible 12 to be awarded the Norm Goss Memorial Medal as best on ground.

==== Teams ====
Werribee
B:	32. Sam Paea	19. Sam Azzi	18. Nathan Cooper
HB:	9. Louis Pinnuck	27. Jesse Clark	34. Jaelen Pavlidis
C:	7. Nick Hayes	29. Dom Brew (c)	26. Riley Bice
HF:	24. Jay Dahlhaus	17. Aidan Johnson	33. Jack Riding
F:	36. Zac Banch	1. Hudson Garoni	20. Flynn Young
Foll:	50. Sam Conway	8. Jack Henderson	35. Jake Smith
Int:	4. Cooper Whyte	28. Stefan Radovanovic	16. Harry Grintell
Int:	22. Bior Malual	21. Angus Hicks	
Coach:	Jimmy Allan		

Southport
B:	11. Ben Jepson	30. Nick Williams	6. Max Spencer
HB:	10. Mackenzie Willis	17. Keegan Gray	25. Jesse Joyce
C:	4. Michael Manteit	16. Matt Shannon	14. Matt McGuinness
HF:	15. Wylie Buzza	2. Zac Foot	21. Jackson Edwards
F:	28. Jack Sexton	29. Hugh Dixon	3. Jacob Dawson (c)
Foll:	20. Brayden Crossley (c)	5. Jacob Heron	1. Boyd Woodcock
Int:	33. Campbell Lake	12. Jay Lockhart	18. Rhys Clark
Int:	32. Brock Aston	27. Will Sexton	
Coach:	Steve Daniel		

== Awards ==
J. J. Liston Trophy winner Dom Brew (Werribee)

- The J. J. Liston Trophy was won by Dom Brew (Werribee), who polled 31 votes. Brew finished ahead of Boyd Woodcock (Southport) who polled 22 votes to finish second in the count for the third consecutive season; and Mitch Hardie (Geelong) who polled 19 votes.
- The Jim 'Frosty' Miller Medal was won by Billy Gowers (Port Melbourne), who kicked 50 goals during the home-and-away season.
- The Fothergill–Round–Mitchell Medal was won by Sam Davidson (Richmond).
- The Coaches MVP award was won by Dom Brew (Werribee).

=== Team of the Year ===
2024 VFL Team of the Year
B:	Tom Highmore (Port Melbourne)	Nathan Cooper (Werribee)	Luke Parks (Williamstown)
HB:	Rory Atkins (Gold Coast)	Aaron Francis (Sydney)	Ben Jepson (Southport)
C:	Saad El-Hawli (Northern Bullants/Essendon)	Tom Murphy (Frankston)	George Grey (Frankston)
HF:	Jack Watkins (North Melbourne)	Liam McMahon (Carlton)	Mitch Hardie (Geelong)
F:	Boyd Woodcock (Southport)	Billy Gowers (Port Melbourne)	Matt Johnson (Frankston)
Foll:	Nick Bryan (Essendon)	Jarryd Lyons (Brisbane)	Dom Brew (c) (Werribee)
Int:	Riley Bice (Werribee)	Jacob Dawson (Southport)	Flynn Gentile (Coburg)
Int:	Jack Henderson (Werribee)	Ned Moyle (Gold Coast)	Deven Robertson (Brisbane)
Coach:	Jimmy Allan (Werribee)		

=== Club best and fairest winners ===
Club	Winner	Ref
Box Hill	Jai Serong	
Brisbane	Jarryd Lyons	
Carlton	Liam McMahon	
Casey	Mitch White	
Coburg	Flynn Gentile	
Collingwood	Sam Glover	
Essendon	Jackson Hately	
Footscray	Cooper Craig-Peters	
Frankston	Tom Murphy	
Geelong	Mitch Hardie	
Gold Coast	Hewago Oea	
Greater Western Sydney	Conor Stone	
North Melbourne	Jack Watkins	
Northern Bullants	Jean-Luc Velissaris	
Port Melbourne	Billy Gowers	
Richmond	Tom Brindley	
Richmond	Sam Davidson	
Richmond	Lachlan Wilson	
Sandringham	Tom Campbell	
Southport	Boyd Woodcock	
Sydney	Caleb Mitchell	
Werribee	Dom Brew	
Williamstown	Luke Parks	

== See also ==
- 2024 VFL Women's season
- 2024 AFL season
