= Mackenzie Willis =

Australian rules footballer (born 1995)

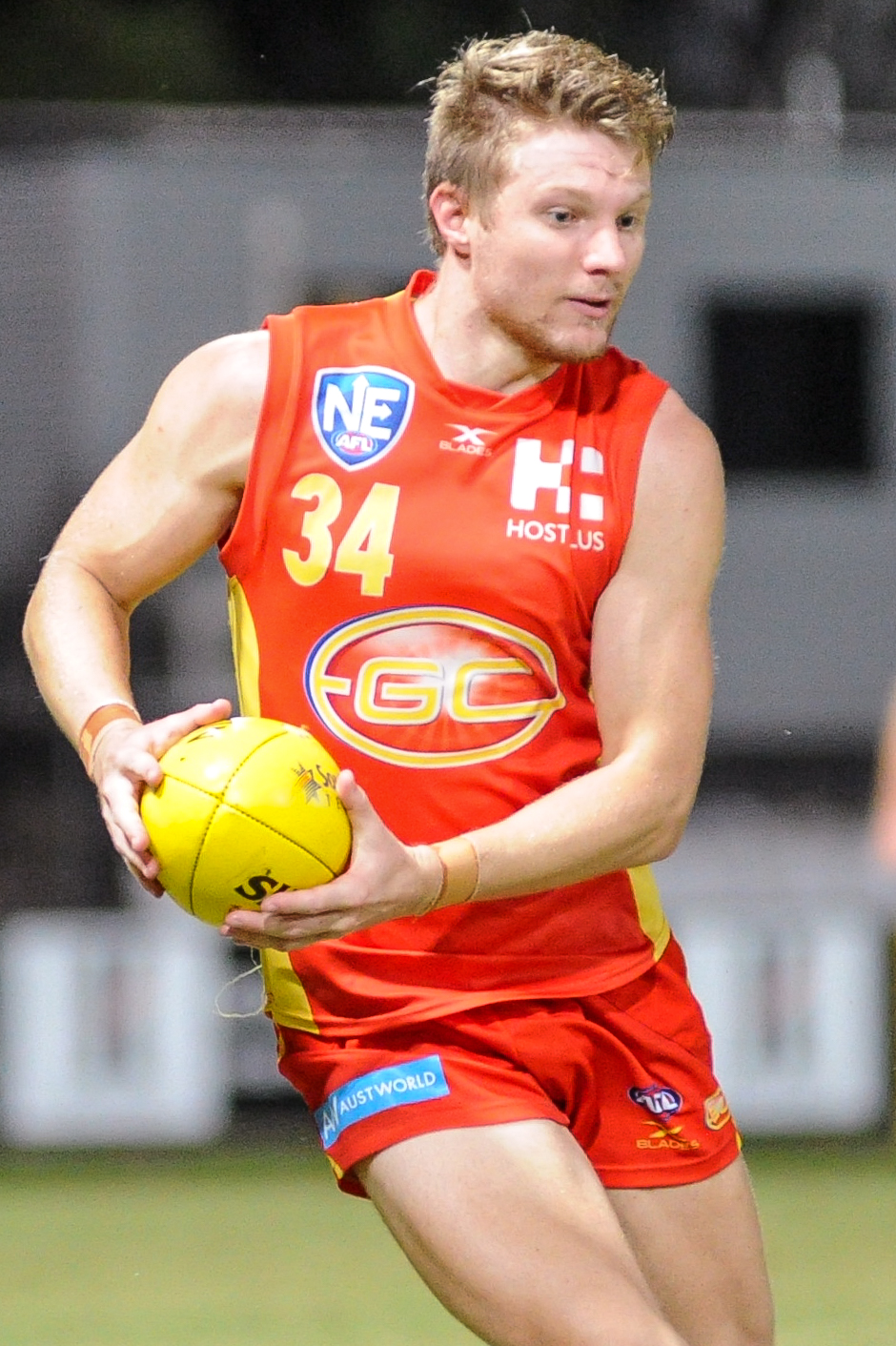
- Willis playing for Gold Coast in May 2017

Personal information
- Full name: Mackenzie Willis
- Born: 7 August 1995 (age 31)
- Original team: Kingborough (TSL)
- Draft: No. 52, 2015 national draft
- Debut: Round 6, 2016, Gold Coast vs. Geelong, at Simonds Stadium
- Height: 182 cm (6 ft 0 in)
- Weight: 82 kg (181 lb)
- Position: Defender

Playing career^{1}
Years	Club	Games (Goals)
2016-2018	Gold Coast	5 (0)
- ^{1} Playing statistics correct to the end of 2018.

Mackenzie Willis (born 7 August 1995) is an Australian rules footballer who currently plays for the Southport Sharks in the Victorian Football League (VFL). He previously for the Gold Coast Suns in the Australian Football League (AFL).

Willis was drafted by Gold Coast with their fourth selection and fifty-second overall in the 2015 national draft. He made his debut in the 120 point loss against Geelong in round 6, 2016 at Simonds Stadium. He was delisted by Gold Coast at the conclusion of the 2018 season.

Willis played for Southport in the club's six-point 2024 VFL grand final loss to Werribee.
