= Mitch Knevitt =

Australian rules footballer (born 2003)

Mitchell Knevitt
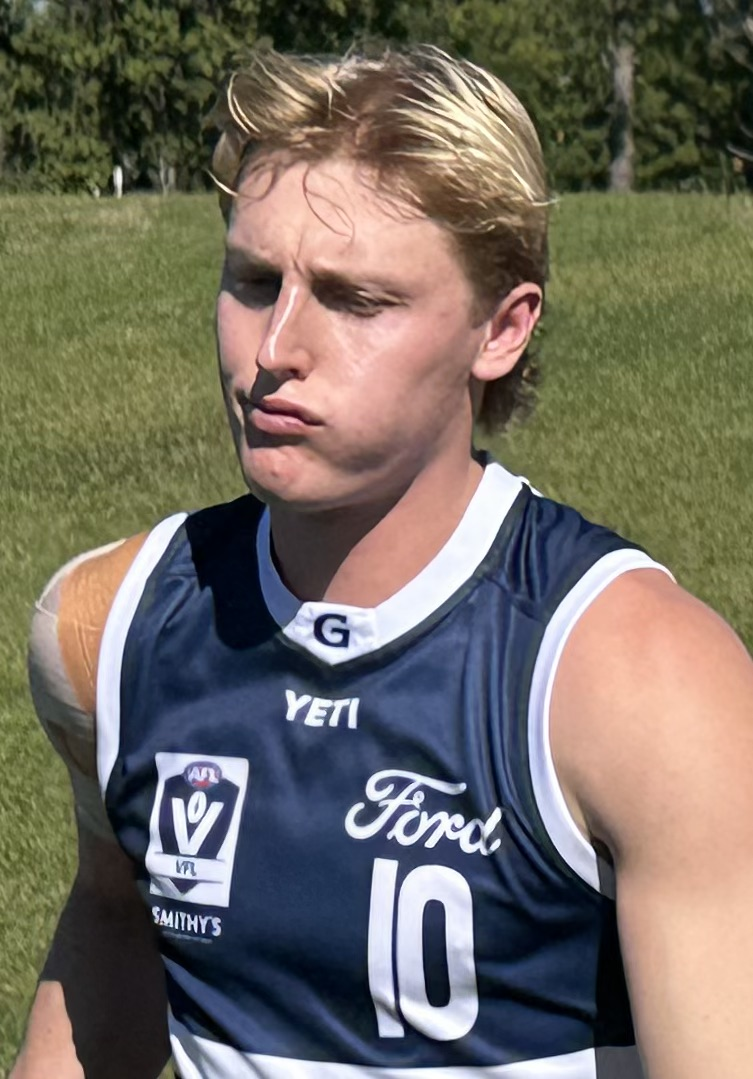
- Knevitt in June 2026

Personal information
- Full name: Mitchell Knevitt
- Born: 8 January 2003 (age 23)
- Original team: Geelong Falcons (Talent League); Grovedale (GFNL)
- Draft: No. 25, 2021 national draft No. 48, 2026 national draft
- Debut: Round 8, 2022, Geelong vs. Greater Western Sydney, at Manuka Oval
- Height: 193 cm (6 ft 4 in)
- Weight: 85 kg (187 lb)
- Position: Midfielder

Club information
- Current club: Sydney

Playing career^{1}
| Years | Club | Games (Goals) |
| 2022–2026 | Geelong | 23 (7) |
| 2027– | Sydney | 0 (0) |
| Total | | 23 (7) |
- ^{1} Playing statistics correct to the end of 2026.

Mitchell Knevitt (born 8 January 2003) is an Australian rules footballer who plays for the Sydney Swans in the Australian Football League (AFL). He previously played for the Geelong Football Club between 2022 and 2026.

Geelong selected Knevitt with pick 25 in the 2021 AFL draft. Knevitt made his AFL debut in round 8 of the 2022 AFL season against GWS as the medical sub.

== Junior career ==
Knevitt was educated at Grovedale College. In 2021, he finished first in the Geelong Falcons best-and-fairest, ousting fellow future Geelong draftee Cooper Whyte (who finished second).

Knevitt was described as a "unique prospect" with great contested marking ability and athleticism for a tall. Knevitt was identified by AFL recruiters ahead of the 2021 AFL draft, eventually being selected by Geelong with pick 25.

== AFL career ==
=== Geelong (2022–2026) ===
Knevitt made his debut in Round 8 of the 2022 AFL season, getting the call up as the medical sub after a late change. Knevitt continued his rise throughout the 2023 AFL season, playing 8 games and kicking 2 goals.

After being delisted by Geelong at the conclusion of the 2026 AFL season, Knevitt was picked up by the Sydney Swans in the national draft following.

== Statistics ==
Updated to the end of the 2026 season.

Legend
| G | Goals | K | Kicks | D | Disposals | T | Tackles |
| B | Behinds | H | Handballs | M | Marks |

| Season | Team | No. | Games | Totals | | | | | | | Averages (per game) | | | | | | | Votes |
| Season | Team | No. | Games | G | B | K | H | D | M | T | G | B | K | H | D | M | T | Votes |
|---|---|---|---|---|---|---|---|---|---|---|---|---|---|---|---|---|---|---|
| 2022 | Geelong | 10 | 2 | 0 | 2 | 10 | 12 | 22 | 8 | 3 | 0.0 | 1.0 | 5.0 | 6.0 | 11.0 | 4.0 | 1.5 | 0 |
| 2023 | Geelong | 10 | 8 | 2 | 3 | 61 | 34 | 95 | 24 | 19 | 0.3 | 0.4 | 7.6 | 4.3 | 11.9 | 3.0 | 2.4 | 0 |
| 2024 | Geelong | 10 | 4 | 2 | 1 | 18 | 9 | 27 | 13 | 10 | 0.5 | 0.3 | 4.5 | 2.3 | 6.8 | 3.3 | 2.5 | 0 |
| 2025 | Geelong | 10 | 7 | 1 | 3 | 37 | 44 | 81 | 17 | 26 | 0.1 | 0.4 | 5.3 | 6.3 | 11.6 | 2.4 | 3.7 | 0 |
| 2026 | Geelong | 10 | 2 | 2 | 2 | 11 | 10 | 21 | 4 | 7 | 1.0 | 1.0 | 5.5 | 5.0 | 10.5 | 2.0 | 3.5 | 0 |
| Career | | | 23 | 7 | 11 | 137 | 109 | 246 | 66 | 65 | 0.3 | 0.5 | 6.0 | 4.7 | 10.7 | 2.9 | 2.8 | 0 |
