= Dan Lowther =

Australian rules footballer

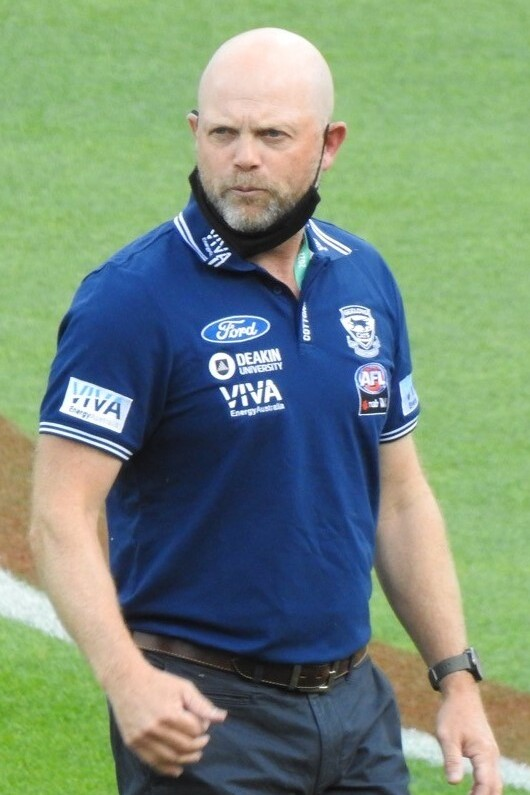
- Lowther with Geelong in 2022

Personal information
- Full name: Daniel Lowther
- Born: 19 April 1977 (age 49)
- Original team: Northern Knights (TAC Cup)
- Draft: No. 61, 1995 national draft
- Debut: Round 16, 1997, Geelong vs. Richmond, at Kardinia Park
- Height: 181 cm (5 ft 11 in)
- Weight: 77 kg (170 lb)
- Position: Defender

Playing career
Years	Club	Games (Goals)
1997–2001	Geelong	34 (9)

Coaching career
Years	Club	Games (W–L–D)
2022 (S6)–2025	Geelong (W)	57 (26–30–1)

Daniel Lowther (born 19 April 1977) is a former Australian rules footballer and coach. He played for the Geelong Football Club in the Australian Football League (AFL) and later coached the club in the AFL Women's (AFLW). As of 2026, he is currently the senior coach of the Werribee Football Club in the Victorian Football League competition.

== Early life ==
Lowther originally played for Diamond Creek, and played for the Northern Knights prior to being drafted. Geelong selected him with pick 61 in the 1995 National Draft.

== AFL career ==
Lowther made his debut for Geelong in 1997, before making 30 of his 34 league appearances in 1998 and 1999. He was delisted by Geelong after not making a senior team appearance in the 2000 AFL season, but was redrafted again by Geelong with pick 71 in the 2000 AFL draft, making his final appearance in 2001.

Delisted again, Lowther joined West Adelaide in the SANFL in 2002, later returning to play local football in the Geelong region for Bell Park and Portarlington.

== AFL Women's coaching career ==
Lowther joined Geelong as an assistant coach to the VFL team (Geelong reserves) in 2015, then in 2018 joined the AFL team as an analyst. In 2020, he joined the Geelong AFLW coaching team as an assistant coach, looking after the midfield.

On 29 June 2021, Lowther was promoted to be the head coach of the Geelong AFLW team, replacing Paul Hood.

Lowther led Geelong back to the AFLW finals in 2022 AFL Women's season 7.

On the 20th of November, 2025 it was announced that he had stepped down from the role after 5 seasons.

On the 10th of December, 2025 he was announced as the new senior coach of the Werribee Football Club in the Victorian Football League competition for the 2026 season, replacing James Allan (Australian footballer) who had been appointed as an assistant coach at St. Kilda. Lowthers first season was impressive leading Werribee to second place on the ladder however with injuries to key players occurring before and during the finals they exited the finals series in straight sets. It was still regarded as an impressive achievement, considering their 16th placed finish the previous season and had effectively started the role in the new year.
