= Wylie Buzza =

Australian rules footballer (born 1996)

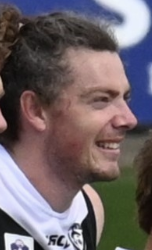

Personal information
- Full name: Wylie Buzza
- Born: 2 March 1996 (age 30); Gatton, Queensland
- Original team: Mount Gravatt (QAFL)
- Draft: No. 69, 2015 national draft
- Debut: Round 15, 2017, Geelong vs. Greater Western Sydney, at Spotless Stadium
- Height: 198 cm (6 ft 6 in)
- Weight: 102 kg (225 lb)
- Position: Forward

Playing career^{1}
Years	Club	Games (Goals)
2017–2019	Geelong	9 (6)
2020	Port Adelaide	0 (0)
Total		9 (6)
- ^{1} Playing statistics correct to the end of 2020.

Wylie Buzza (born 2 March 1996) is an Australian rules footballer who currently plays for the Southport Football Club in the Victorian Football League (VFL). He previously for the Geelong and Port Adelaide in the Australian Football League (AFL), before delisted at the conclusion of the 2020 season.

== Early life ==
Buzza was raised in Gatton, Queensland. His first sport was rugby league and his dream was to play for the Brisbane Broncos and Queensland Maroons. He played until the age of 15, making the Toowoomba U14 squad in 2010. At that age he joined the Lockyer Valley Demons where he first played junior Australian football. A standout player, he was selected in the Brisbane Lions Academy as a youngster before he was drafted by Geelong with the sixty-ninth overall pick in the 2015 national draft.

== Career ==
=== AFL ===
Buzza made his debut in the draw against Greater Western Sydney at Spotless Stadium in round fifteen of the 2017 season, where he kicked two goals. Wylie welcomed being a cult hero at Geelong, provided he was not a dud cult hero. He was delisted at the conclusion of the 2019 AFL season, but was picked up by Port Adelaide as a delisted free agent.

=== VFL ===
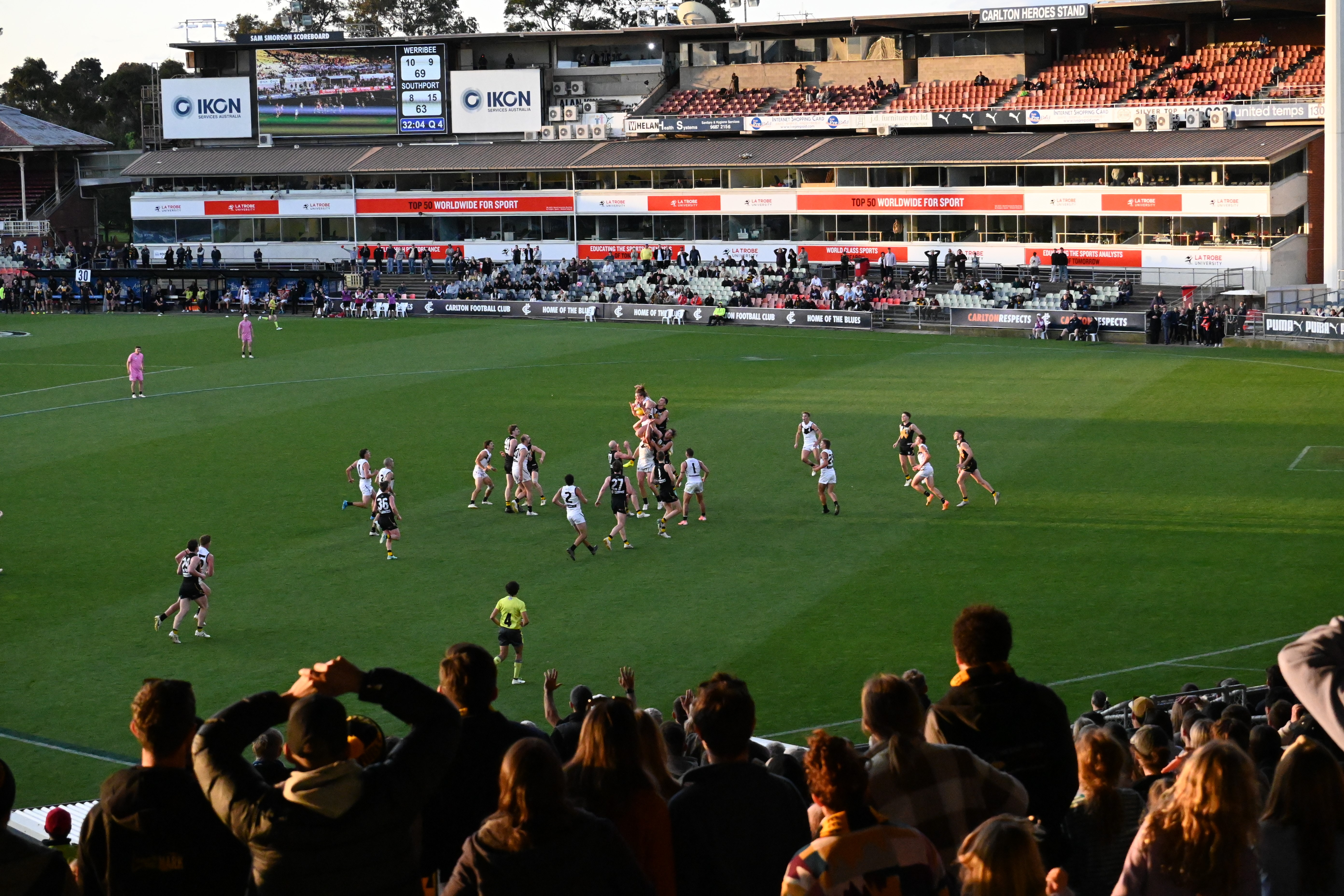
Buzza almost pulled in a spectacular mark during the final minute of the 2024 VFL grand final

Buzza played the 2021 season for the Werribee Football Club in the Victorian Football League. He returned to Queensland to play with the Brisbane Lions VFL team for 2022.

Buzza kicked 7 goals in his QAFL debut for Morningside on 29 April 2023.

Buzza played for Southport in the club's six-point 2024 VFL grand final loss to Werribee. He almost pulled in a spectacular mark inside Southport's forward line during the final minute of the game.
