= Aidan Johnson =

Personal information
- Born: 9 March 2000 (age 26)
- Original team: Lavington/Werribee
- Draft: No. 68, 2024 AFL draft
- Debut: Round 1, 2025, Melbourne vs. Greater Western Sydney, at MCG
- Height: 193 cm (6 ft 4 in)
- Position: Key Forward

Playing career^{1}
Years	Club	Games (Goals)
2025–2026	Melbourne	6 (3)
- ^{1} Playing statistics correct to the end of the 2026 season.

Career highlights
- VFL premiership player: 2024

Aidan Johnson (born 9 March 2000) is a former professional Australian rules footballer who played for the Melbourne Football Club in the Australian Football League (AFL).

== VFL career ==
Johnson played for the Lavington Panthers in the Ovens and Murray Football League before being recruited by Werribee in the VFL during 2021.

Johnson found good form for Werribee in 2024, including a period of five games where he kicked 11 goals. He was a part of Werribee's team for the 2024 VFL Grand Final, which they would go on to win.

== AFL career ==
Johnson was selected by Melbourne with pick 68 of the 2024 AFL draft. He made his debut in round 1 of the 2025 AFL season, kicking a goal in his first game.

At the end of the 2026 AFL season, Johnson was delisted by Melbourne.

== Statistics ==
Updated to the end of the 2026 season.

Legend
G	Goals	K	Kicks	D	Disposals	T	Tackles
B	Behinds	H	Handballs	M	Marks

Season	Team	No.	Games	Totals							Averages (per game)							Votes
Season	Team	No.	Games	G	B	K	H	D	M	T	G	B	K	H	D	M	T	Votes
2025	Melbourne	42	5	3	3	15	12	27	5	15	0.6	0.6	3.0	2.4	5.4	1.0	3.0	0
2026	Melbourne	42	1	0	0	4	6	10	3	4	0.0	0.0	4.0	6.0	10.0	3.0	4.0	0
Career			6	3	3	19	18	37	8	19	0.5	0.5	3.2	3.0	6.2	1.3	3.2	0
