= Andy Demetriou (footballer, born 1958) =

Australian rules footballer

Personal information
- Full name: Andreas Demetriou
- Born: 4 July 1958 (age 68); Gold Coast, Queensland, Australia
- Original team: St Kilda City
- Height: 192 cm (6 ft 4 in)
- Weight: 76 kg (168 lb)
- Position: Forward

Playing career^{1}
Years	Club	Games (Goals)
1977	South Melbourne	1 (0)
1979–82	Port Melbourne	24 (?)
- ^{1} Playing statistics correct to the end of 1982.

Career highlights
- VFA premierships - Port Melbourne 1981, 1982

Andreas Demetriou (born 4 July 1958) is a former Australian rules footballer who played for South Melbourne in the Victorian Football League (VFL) and Port Melbourne in the Victorian Football Association (VFA).

== Playing career ==
Demetriou made one VFL appearance for South Melbourne as a reserve in a match against Collingwood in June 1977.

After leaving South Melbourne, he moved to Port Melbourne where he played in two VFA premiership-winning teams.

== Post-football career ==
As well as acting as a sport psychologist for Werribee Football Club, Demetriou runs a deli in the Melbourne suburb of Albert Park.
