= Sam Davidson =

Personal information
- Born: 13 December 2001 (age 24)
- Original team: Richmond (VFL)
- Draft: No. 51, 2024 national draft
- Debut: 15 March 2025, Western Bulldogs vs. North Melbourne, at Marvel Stadium
- Height: 191 cm (6 ft 3 in)
- Position: Midfielder

Club information
- Current club: Western Bulldogs
- Number: 42

Playing career^{1}
Years	Club	Games (Goals)
2025–	Western Bulldogs	33 (19)
- ^{1} Playing statistics correct to the end of round 22, 2026.

Career highlights
- Fothergill–Round–Mitchell Medal: 2024

Sam Davidson (born 13 December 2001) is a professional Australian rules footballer with the Western Bulldogs in the Australian Football League (AFL).

== Early life and education ==
Davidson grew up in Brighton and attended St Kevin’s College, hailing from a high achieving family. He grew up playing junior football for East Brighton Vampires and Ormond in the South Metro Junior Football League. Davidson grew up a Western Bulldogs supporter, watching from the stands during the drought-breaking 2016 AFL Grand Final. He enrolled in a medical degree at Monash University, playing local football at St Kevin’s Old Boys, Sale City, Maffra and South Mildura due to rural Hospital placements until 2024, when he made the decision to alter his studies five out of six years into the degree to pursue an AFL career. He then played for Richmond in the VFL in 2024 winning the Fothergill–Round–Mitchell Medal as the most talented young player in the competition.

== AFL career ==
Davidson was selected at Pick 51 in 2024 national draft as mature aged recruit by the same club he had supported since childhood, the Western Bulldogs. Even attending a match, the same day he had a pre-draft interview with the club. He impressed and showed his talent in a pre-season game against Hawthorn collecting 29 disposals and a goal. Due to these impressive performances he made his debut in round 1 of the 2025 AFL season. On debut, Davidson kicked a goal and had 10 disposals. In only his third game, an eight-point win over Carlton, he was judged amongst the best on ground, with a 31-disposal game.

== Statistics ==
Updated to the end of round 22, 2026.

Legend
G	Goals	K	Kicks	D	Disposals	T	Tackles
B	Behinds	H	Handballs	M	Marks

Season	Team	No.	Games	Totals							Averages (per game)							Votes
Season	Team	No.	Games	G	B	K	H	D	M	T	G	B	K	H	D	M	T	Votes
2025	Western Bulldogs	42	19	13	8	182	113	295	81	52	0.7	0.4	9.6	5.9	15.5	4.3	2.7	0
2026	Western Bulldogs	42	14	6	7	105	55	160	41	36	0.4	0.5	7.5	3.9	11.4	2.9	2.6	0
Career			33	19	15	287	168	455	122	88	0.6	0.5	8.7	5.1	13.8	3.7	2.7	0
