= Jack Henderson (Australian footballer) =

Australian rules footballer (born 1999)

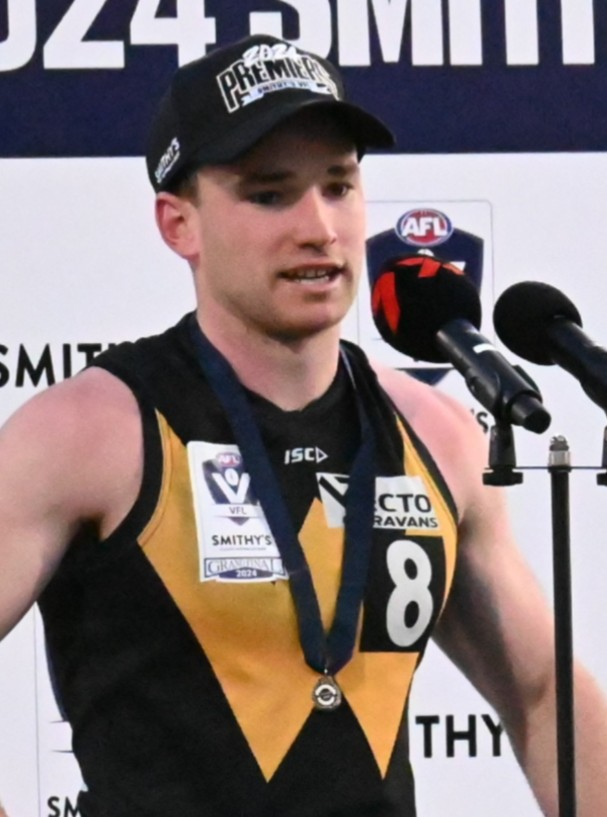
- Henderson with Werribee in 2024

Personal information
- Born: 1 October 1999 (age 27)
- Original team: Deniliquin/Geelong College/St Mary's/Geelong Falcons/Werribee/Sturt
- Draft: 2025 pre-season supplemental selection period
- Debut: Round 1, 2025, Melbourne vs. Greater Western Sydney, at MCG
- Height: 177 cm (5 ft 10 in)
- Position: Forward

Playing career^{1}
Years	Club	Games (Goals)
2025–2026	Melbourne	5 (2)
- ^{1} Playing statistics correct to the end of the 2026 season.

Career highlights
- VFL premiership player: 2024; Norm Goss Memorial Medal: 2024; Melbourne's best VFL Player: 2026

Jack Henderson (born 1 October 1999) is a former professional Australian rules footballer who played for the Melbourne Football Club in the Australian Football League (AFL).

== Pre-AFL career ==
Henderson began playing football with Deniliquin in the Murray Football Netball League in New South Wales. He boarded at Geelong College in Victoria, playing for his school side and winning their best and fairest award, as well as representing St Mary's in the Geelong Football Netball League and the Geelong Falcons in the Talent League. Henderson was part of the Geelong Falcons Grand Final side in 2017, having 16 disposals in a two-point win.

After going undrafted, Henderson joined Werribee in the VFL ahead of the 2018 VFL season. In 2020, with the COVID-19 pandemic resulting in the cancellation of the 2020 VFL season, Henderson moved to Sturt in the SANFL for one year before returning to Werribee in 2021. Henderson played in the 2024 VFL Grand Final. He had 23 disposals and two goals, receiving the Norm Goss Memorial Medal in a six-point win.

== AFL career ==
Henderson was selected by the Melbourne Football Club during the 2025 pre-season supplemental selection period. He made his debut in round 1 of the 2025 AFL season. At the end of the season, Henderson signed a one-year contract extension to the end of 2026.

Henderson was delisted at the end of the 2026 AFL season yet won Melbourne's best VFL player the same year.

== Personal life ==
As well as Australian rules football, Henderson works as an agronomist.

== Statistics ==
Updated to the end of the 2026 season.

Legend
G	Goals	K	Kicks	D	Disposals	T	Tackles
B	Behinds	H	Handballs	M	Marks

Season	Team	No.	Games	Totals							Averages (per game)							Votes
Season	Team	No.	Games	G	B	K	H	D	M	T	G	B	K	H	D	M	T	Votes
2025	Melbourne	43	5	2	2	25	25	50	11	10	0.4	0.4	5.0	5.0	10.0	2.2	2.0	0
2026	Melbourne	43	0	—	—	—	—	—	—	—	—	—	—	—	—	—	—	0
Career			5	2	2	25	25	50	11	10	0.4	0.4	5.0	5.0	10.0	2.2	2.0	0
