= James Allan (Australian footballer) =

Australian rules footballer (born 1985)

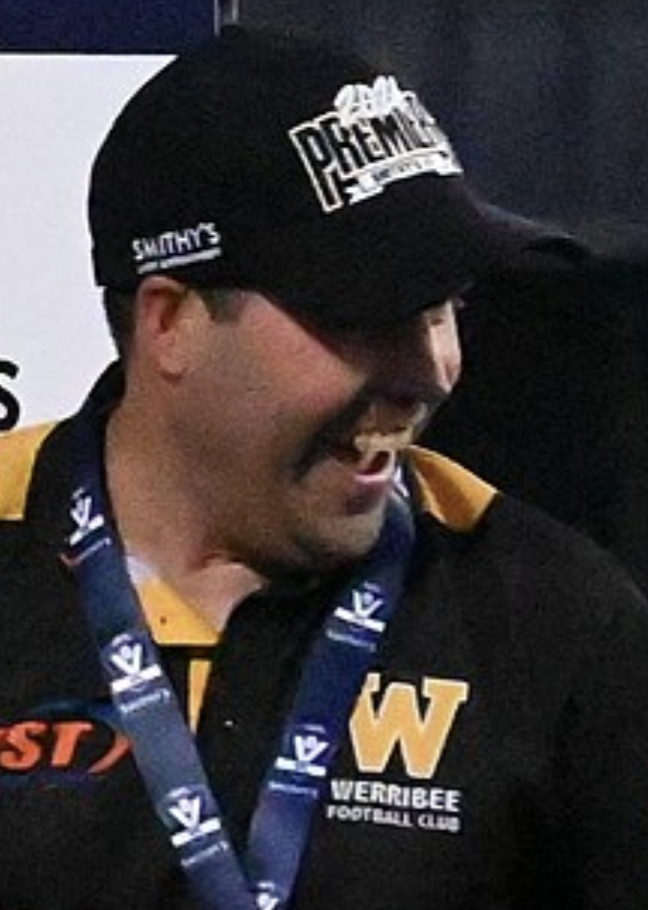

Personal information
- Full name: James Robert Allan
- Nickname: Jimmy
- Born: 17 January 1985 (age 41)
- Original team: Lara
- Height: 176 cm (5 ft 9 in)
- Weight: 76 kg (168 lb)
- Position: Centre

Playing career^{1}
Years	Club	Games (Goals)
2007–2012	North Adelaide	117 (70)
2014–2015	Norwood	27 (8)
- ^{1} Playing statistics correct to the end of 2012.

Career highlights
- Playing: Magarey Medallist 2007, 2010–2011; North Adelaide best and fairest 2007–2011; The Advertiser Player of the Year 2007, 2010; The Advertiser Team of the Year 2007–2011; South Australian Football Budget Player of the Year 2007–2011; North Adelaide club captain 2012; SANFL premiership player 2014; Two state games for South Australia; Coaching: VFL premiership coach: 2024

James Robert "Jimmy" Allan (born 17 January 1985) is an Australian rules footballer who played for North Adelaide and the Norwood in the South Australian National Football League (SANFL). Allan is a three-time winner of the league's highest individual honour, the Magarey Medal (2007, 2010 and 2011).

== Playing career ==
A junior player at Lara, Allan was drafted to the Geelong Football Club with pick 21 in the 2004 Rookie draft which formed part of the 2003 AFL draft. After one season, he was delisted and found himself with the Werribee Football Club where he played two seasons while the club were aligned to the Western Bulldogs which included the 2005 Grand Final defeat. Seeking a change, Allan moved to South Australia with the North Adelaide Football Club.

Allan was recruited to the Roosters for the 2007 season and became an instant star for the club. After making his league debut against Central District in round 1 of the 2007 season Allan went on to win the first of his three Magarey Medals. He dominated the media awards for the season winning The Advertiser and Football Budget Player of the Year and won selection in The Advertiser's Team of the Year. He also won North Adelaide's best and fairest award for the first of five consecutive times.

North's form for 2007 rose with the arrival of Allan and they played in their first Grand Final since their 1991 premiership. Central District were too good for the Roosters, North going down by 65 points, 5.12 (42) to 16.11 (107).

Allan continued to take the SANFL by storm, further dominating league, media and club awards. He added the 2010 and 2011 Magarey Medals to his 2007 win and would be selected to every Advertiser Team of the Year since his debut as well as five consecutive Football Budget Player of the Year awards from 2007–2011.

As of the end of the 2011 season, Allan is second only to Barrie Robran in both Magarey Medal wins and North Adelaide best and fairest awards. Allan has won five best and fairest awards for the Roosters (2007–11) while Robran won eight during his stellar career (1967–73 and 1976).

On 5 September 2012, it was announced that Allan would end his career with North Adelaide at the end of the season and return to his native Victoria in 2013.

In mid-November 2013, the North Adelaide Football Club announced that Allan was returning to take up a teaching position in Adelaide and would rejoin the club as a player for the 2014 season. Unfortunately for North Adelaide fans, Allan did not play for the club in 2014. Due to salary cap issues he could not come to terms with the club and announced he would play for rival club Norwood. He was included in Norwood's 2014 Grand Final team after missing the previous six weeks with a broken arm. He finished with 23 disposals, five clearances and five tackles and most importantly, a premiership medallion.

=== Representative career ===
Allan has represented South Australia twice in interstate football.

== Coaching career ==
In 2018, Allan joined the Norwood coaching staff. He served as their under-18s head coach in 2018 and 2019, before being promoted to senior midfield coach in 2020.

In 2020, Allan was named the inaugural football director of Rostrevor College in Woodforde, South Australia, a suburb of Adelaide.

Allan joined the North Adelaide coaching staff for the 2023 season as their forwards assistant coach.

On 10 November 2023, Allan was named senior coach of Werribee, returning to the VFL club after 17 years in South Australia. In his inaugural season at the helm, he led the Tigers to the 2024 premiership—their second ever, breaking a 31-year flag drought.
