= Grovedale College =

Location
- 19 Wingarra Drive; Grovedale, Victoria; Australia
- Coordinates: 38.2101°S 144.3277°E

Information
- Former name: Grovedale Secondary College
- Type: secondary school
- Established: 1979
- Principal: Janet Matthews
- Grades: 7–12
- Enrolment: Approx. 1,000
- Campus: Suburban
- Colour(s): Maroon, blue and white
- Website: www.grovedale.vic.edu.au

Grovedale College (formerly known as Grovedale Secondary College) is an Australian public high school located in Grovedale, Victoria, a suburb in the city of Geelong. It was established in 1979 as the Grovedale Technical High School. Under the guidance of the founding principal R "Bob" Arnup the new school prospered and developed a unique status at the time as a model of progressive education.

== Notable former students ==
- Darcy Parish
- Rhys Mathieson
- Gryan Miers
