= Highgate Recreation Reserve =

Sports venue in Craigieburn, Victoria

Highgate Reserve
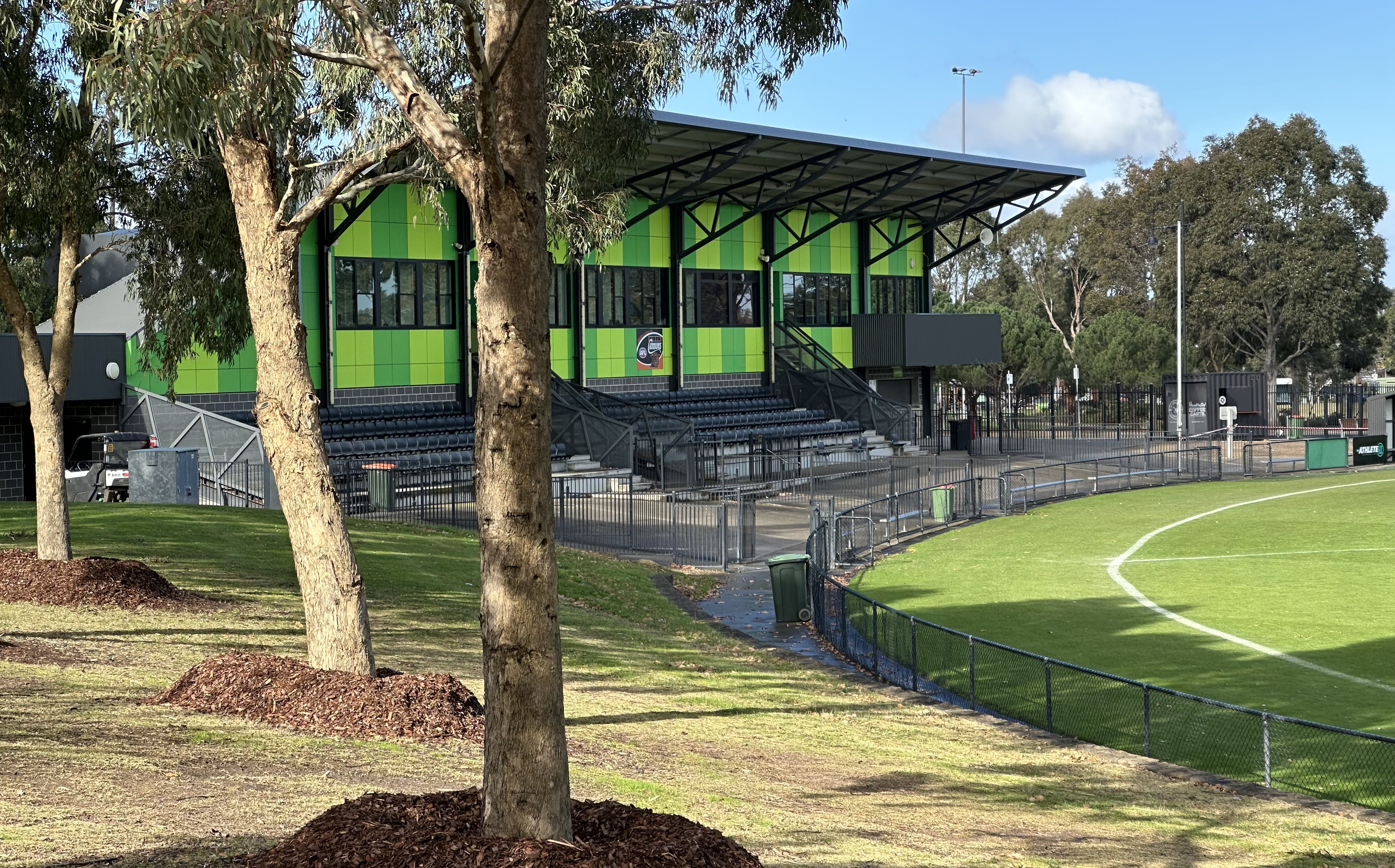
- Highgate Reserve Oval 1 in July 2026
- Interactive map of Highgate Reserve
- Former names: RAMS Arena (2014–2019)
- Address: Grand Blvd; Craigieburn, Victoria
- Coordinates: 37.5768°S 144.9234°E
- Owner: City of Hume
- Capacity: 5,000 (250 seated)
- Record attendance: 5,000 (Coburg vs Gold Coast, 12 June 2010)

Construction
- Opened: 24 April 2010; 16 years ago

Tenant
- Calder Cannons (Talent League)

Highgate Recreation Reserve (also known as Highgate Reserve) is a multi-sports complex located in the Melbourne suburb of Craigieburn. The venue features two ovals primarily used for Australian rules football, while the name also refers to the wider public park in which the ovals are located.

The venue is home to the Calder Cannons, which competes in the Talent League. It has also been used as a secondary facility for the Coburg Football Club, which competes in the Victorian Football League (VFL).

== History ==
The ground opened on 24 April 2010 in front of a crowd of 3,000 for a VFL match between Coburg and Box Hill. Later in the 2010 VFL season, a record crowd of 5,000 attended a match between Coburg and Gold Coast for Karmichael Hunt's football debut.

In June 2014, the ground was renamed to RAMS Arena as part of a naming rights agreement with home loans provider RAMS. The name was used until early 2019.

During the 2016 NAB Challenge, the Western Bulldogs hosted Melbourne at the ground. Essendon played a home match in the VFL at the ground in 2018.

Highgate Recreation Reserve has also been used for various matches in the Essendon District Football League (EDFL), including finals. The ground has been vandalised by hoons on several occasions since it was opened.
