= Tom Campbell (footballer, born 1991) =

Australian rules footballer

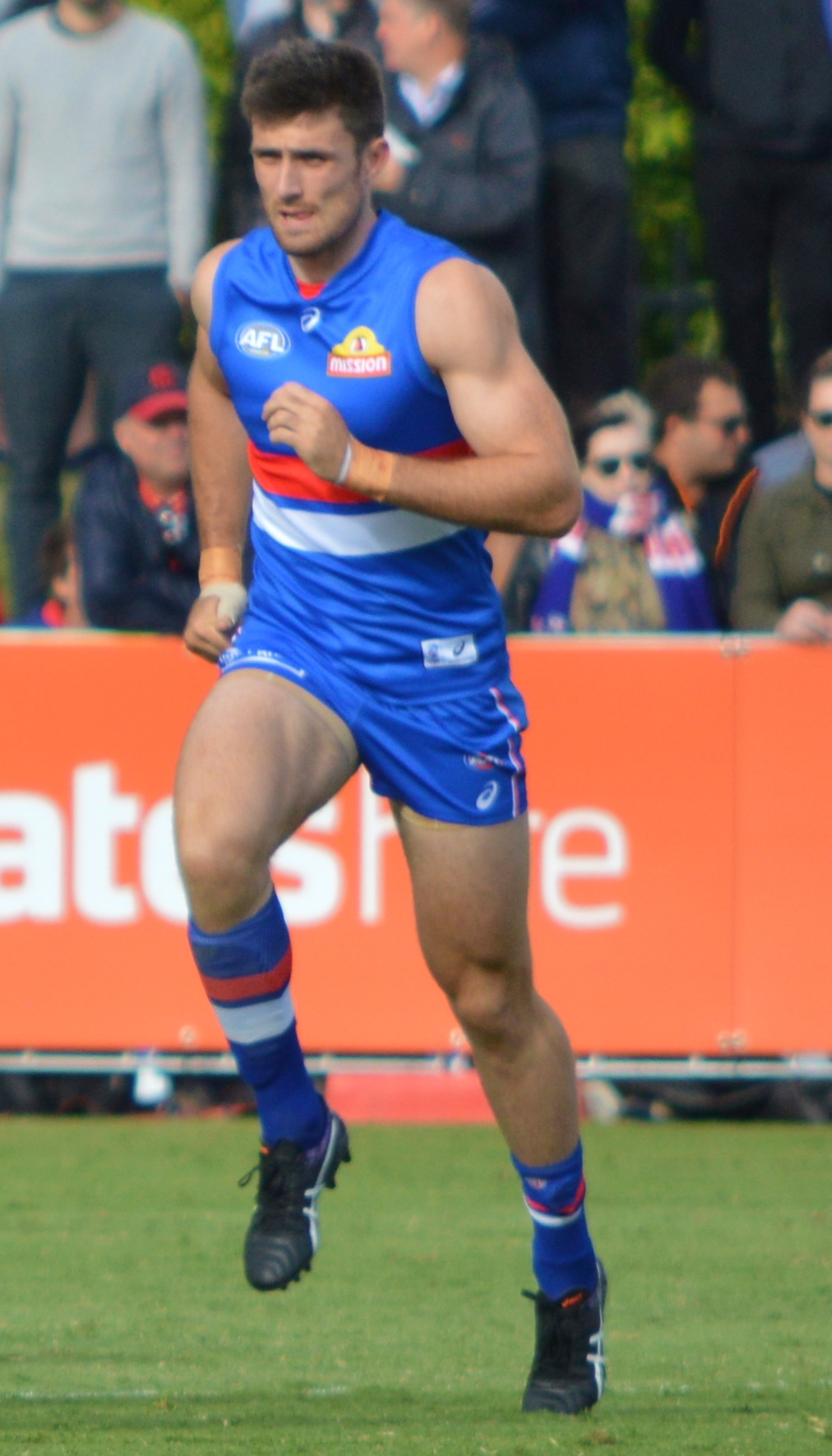
- Campbell with the Western Bulldogs in 2017

Personal information
- Full name: Thomas Jordan Campbell
- Born: 2 November 1991 (age 35)
- Original team: Bendigo Bombers (VFL)
- Draft: No. 27, 2012 rookie draft
- Height: 201 cm (6 ft 7 in)
- Weight: 105 kg (231 lb)
- Position: Ruckman

Playing career
Years	Club	Games (Goals)
2012–2018	Western Bulldogs	42 (23)
2019–2021	North Melbourne	12 (7)
2022–2024	St Kilda	4 (0)
2025–2026	Melbourne	0 (0)
Total		58 (30)

Career highlights
- VFL Premiership: 2016; Ian Ridley Memorial Trophy: 2025

Thomas Campbell (born 2 November 1991) is a former professional Australian rules footballer who played for the Western Bulldogs, North Melbourne, St Kilda and Melbourne in the Australian Football League (AFL).

== AFL career ==
Campbell was recruited by the Western Bulldogs in the 2012 Rookie Draft, with pick #27. He made his debut in Round 13, 2012, against Brisbane Lions at Docklands, having been promoted to the senior list to replace suspended ruckman Will Minson.

After being delisted by the Bulldogs at the conclusion of the 2018 AFL season, Campbell joined North Melbourne as a rookie in the AFL's new supplemental selection period (SSP). On his debut for North Melbourne, senior coach Brad Scott described Campbell as a fierce competitor who gives his all for the team. Campbell reached his 50th AFL game during the 2021 season, where he was lauded by his teammates and coaches for his leadership and guidance while playing tandem in the ruck with Todd Goldstein. Campbell was delisted by the Kangaroos in October 2021, but signed with St Kilda as a delisted free agent the following month. He made his St Kilda debut against Port Adelaide at Cazalys Stadium, Cairns during round 7 of the 2022 season.

Considered a strong clubman and mentor to younger players, Campbell won the Saints 2023 Best Clubman Award, with the Saints’ Executive General Manager of Football describing Campbell’s impact on the club as ‘profound’.

Campbell was delisted by the Saints at the conclusion of the 2024 season. He was soon after signed by Melbourne as a delisted free agent for the 2025 season, in order to assist Melbourne’s All-Australian ruckman Max Gawn.

After suffering a neck injury in the 2026 pre-season, Campbell announced his retirement from the AFL on May 15th 2026, without having played a game for Melbourne.

Campbell played 17 games for the Casey Demons (Melbourne’s VFL affiliate) in 2025, and won the Ian Ridley Memorial Trophy (Club Ambassador Award) at the Demons' 2025 awards.

== Personal life ==
Campbell is an advocate for greater action to combat climate change and outside football is involved in several climate change projects. Along with Jasper Pittard, Campbell launched the AFL Players for Climate Action initiative in 2021, later renamed Footy for Climate.

== Statistics ==
Updated to the end of the 2026 season.

Legend
G	Goals	K	Kicks	D	Disposals	T	Tackles
B	Behinds	H	Handballs	M	Marks

Season	Team	No.	Games	Totals							Averages (per game)							Votes
Season	Team	No.	Games	G	B	K	H	D	M	T	G	B	K	H	D	M	T	Votes
2012	Western Bulldogs	45	7	3	0	26	32	58	17	9	0.4	0.0	3.7	4.6	8.3	2.4	1.3	0
2013	Western Bulldogs	45	6	9	7	23	24	47	14	9	1.5	1.2	3.8	4.0	7.8	2.3	1.5	0
2014	Western Bulldogs	45	7	4	2	22	24	46	13	19	0.6	0.3	3.1	3.4	6.6	1.9	2.7	0
2015	Western Bulldogs	15	6	0	3	24	43	67	14	13	0.0	0.5	4.0	7.2	11.2	2.3	2.2	0
2016	Western Bulldogs	15	9	5	8	55	51	106	33	24	0.6	0.9	6.1	5.7	11.8	3.7	2.7	0
2017	Western Bulldogs	15	7	2	4	31	34	65	15	33	0.3	0.6	4.4	4.9	9.3	2.1	4.7	0
2019	North Melbourne	42	2	1	2	7	8	15	4	3	0.5	1.0	3.5	4.0	7.5	2.0	1.5	0
2020 (Note: The 2020 season was played with 17 home-and-away matches per team (down from 22) and 16-minute quarters with time on (down from 20-minute quarters with time on) due to the impact of the COVID-19 pandemic.)	North Melbourne	42	1	0	0	3	2	5	1	0	0.0	0.0	3.0	2.0	5.0	1.0	0.0	0
2021	North Melbourne	42	9	6	1	49	51	100	35	14	0.7	0.1	5.4	5.7	11.1	3.9	1.6	0
2022	St Kilda	38	2	0	1	14	9	23	7	5	0.0	0.5	7.0	4.5	11.5	3.5	2.5	0
2024	St Kilda	38	2	0	0	6	9	15	4	4	0.0	0.0	3.0	4.5	7.5	2.0	2.0	0
2025	Melbourne	38	0	—	—	—	—	—	—	—	—	—	—	—	—	—	—	0
2026	Melbourne	38	0	—	—	—	—	—	—	—	—	—	—	—	—	—	—	0
Career			58	30	28	260	287	547	157	133	0.5	0.5	4.5	4.9	9.4	2.7	2.3	0
