= Werribee Football Club =

Australian rules football club

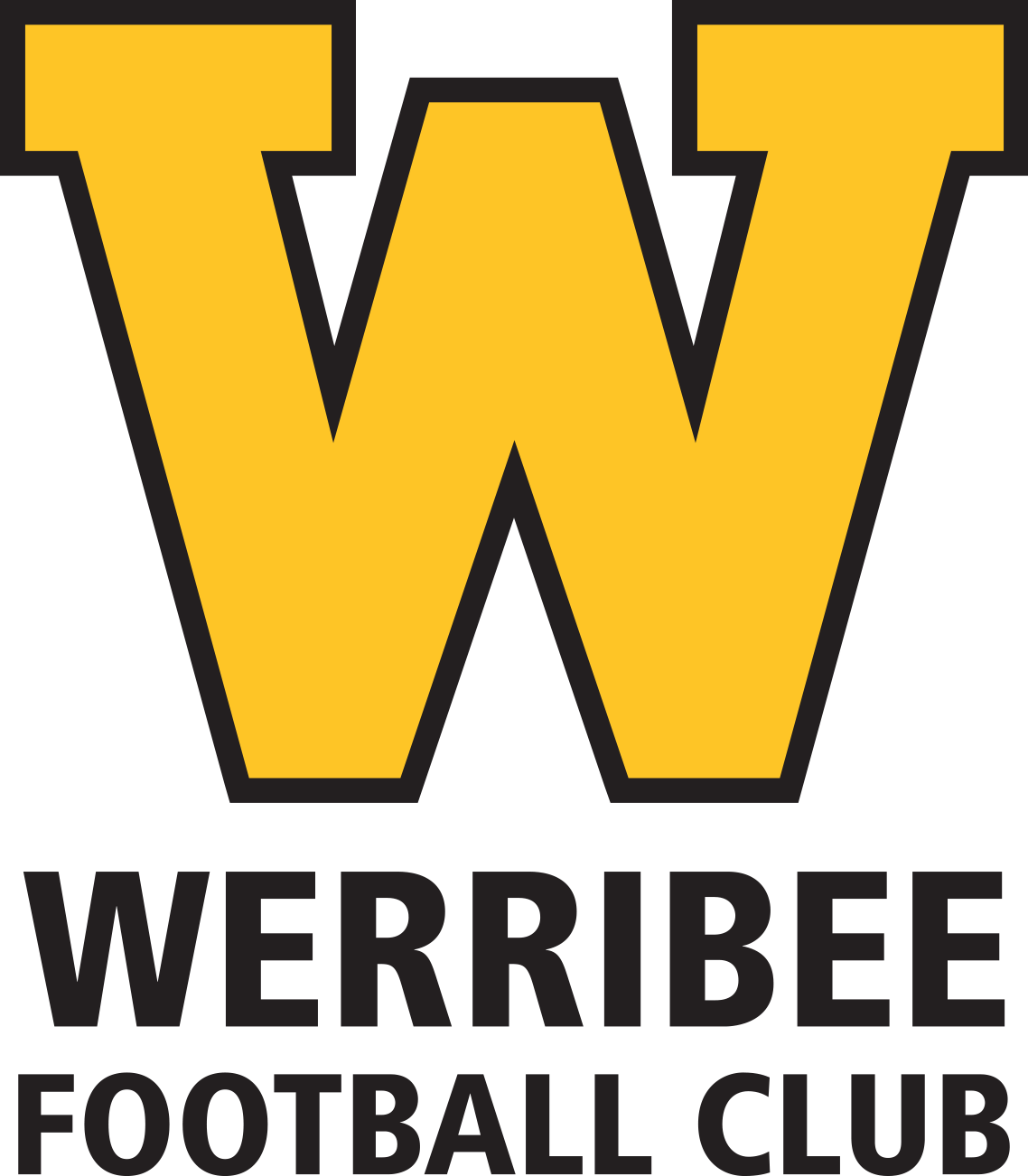

Names
- Full name: Werribee Football Club Limited
- Nickname(s): Tigers, Bees, Killerbees
- Club song: Tune of "US Marines Hymn"

2025 season
- After finals: DNQ
- Home-and-away season: 16th of 21

Club details
- Founded: 1964; 62 years ago
- Colours: Black Gold
- Competition: Victorian Football League
- President: Martin Carter
- Coach: Daniel Lowther
- Captain: Jesse Clark
- Premierships: VFA/VFL (2): 1993; 2024
- Ground: Chirnside Park (5,000)

Uniforms
Home	Away

Other information
- Official website: werribeefc.com.au

The Werribee Football Club, nicknamed the Tigers, is an Australian rules football club based in the suburb of Werribee. The club was formed in 1964 and currently plays in the Victorian Football League (VFL). It is the western-most Melbourne-based VFL club as of 2026.

== History ==
The Werribee Rovers Football Club was formed in May 1912. The Werribee Football Club won the 1920 Lara-Werribee District Football Association premiership.

The current Werribee Football Club was established in 1964 as part of a bid to enter the Victorian Football Association (VFA) in 1965. The new club was formed as an amalgamation of four local clubs which competed in the Werribee District Football League: Werribee South, Irish National Foresters, Services and Metro Farm. In the early years the team was in the second division, and had little success over that time. Geographically distant from all other clubs in what was then a small town partway between Melbourne and Geelong, the club was unable to attract many strong non-local players, and was considered "the lonesome battler" of the Association. Up to 1980, the club had struggled through its sixteen seasons in Division 2 for one finals appearance and four wooden spoons. Its sole success during this time was its victory in the 1978 lightning premiership; it was the only Division 2 club to win that competition during its eight-year existence.

The club embarked on a five-year plan in the late 1970s, which saw the club build its finances, improve its on-field performance to reach the finals in 1981, and open a $200k social club in 1980. This saw the club promoted to Division 1 in 1982, as part of the Association's merit-based restructure of the competition. The club was relegated after finishing last at the end of 1985. The club won the Division 2 minor premiership in 1987, but never won a premiership or even a finals match during its time in Division 2.

In December 1986, Werribee had been earmarked for exclusion under the Association's controversial Football Organisation Review Team (FORT) recommendations, which sought to rationalise the Association to a stronger twelve-club competition in a single division, but which were never formally enacted after being rejected by the clubs. However, after the VFA had contracted to a single division in 1989, Werribee began to enjoy on-field success, and Werribee was one of only two of the FORT review's excluded clubs to survive in the VFA beyond 1991, the other being Springvale.

The club played a major role in the finals during the early 1990s, winning the premiership in 1993, finishing as runner-up after winning the minor premiership in 1991, and playing in a total of five finals series from 1990 to 1995.

At the end of the 1995 season, the club faced another threat to its survival when the Victorian State Football League sought to align the VFA (which at that time renamed the VFL) with the TAC Cup, and needed only one western suburban team to align with the Western Jets. Werribee and Williamstown were ordered to merge; when they could not agree to terms, the VSFL decided to grant the remaining licence to Williamstown, resulting in Werribee's expulsion from the VFL. After Werribee supporters rallied and the club demonstrated a strong position to launch legal action, the VSFL reinstated Werribee's licence under then-unique conditions which left it as the only club without district and TAC Cup feeder teams. The conditions did not harm the club on-field, as it continued to perform strongly, reaching the finals for the next four years, including winning the minor premiership and making a losing Grand Final appearance in 1998. The club was later permitted to take on the Geelong Falcons as its TAC Cup feeder team.

Following the amalgamation of the AFL reserves and the VFL, Werribee entered a reserves affiliation with the AFL's Western Bulldogs, which lasted from 2000 to 2007. The alliance allowed the club to have access to Bulldogs players who were not selected in the senior team. During that time, the club reached a further two Grand Finals in the 2000s: in 2001 and 2005, but lost both. From 2008 until 2015, the club was part of a split-affiliation structure with the North Melbourne Football Club, whereby half of North Melbourne's reserve players were allocated to Werribee and half were allocated to North Ballarat. From 2016 and 2017, the club was fully affiliated with North Melbourne and have access to all North Melbourne reserves players.

In 2018, the club ended its on-field alignment with North Melbourne, becoming a standalone side again for the first time since 1999.

In August 2018, the club announced senior coach John Lamont would be standing down at season's end after five years at the helm. In September, Port Adelaide AFL premiership coach Mark Williams was announced as new senior coach on a three-year deal. Williams would lead the team to a semi final finish after a narrow loss to Essendon under a goal. This brought plenty of momentum for the 2020 season with some excellent recruiting, and were tipped as a premiership contender until the season was halted due to the pandemic.

In December 2020, following the departure of Mark Williams to the Melbourne Football Club, the club announced Michael Barlow as senior coach for season 2021. At the end of the 2023 season, in which Werribee was runner-up in the grand final, Barlow left to join North Melbourne as a Development Manager. After two under achieving seasons in 2021 and 2022 that were affected by the pandemic, Barlow had led the team to the 16-2 finish which included a 17 game winning streak that was ended in the Grand Final that had 20 AFL listed players for the Gold Coast Suns.

Former player and SANFL champion James Allan was appointed as coach for 2024. Many pundits had expected Werribee to slide after the loss of many key players under a new coach, however with a bit of targeted recruiting in key areas along with players who weren't regulars in 2023 either due to injury or lack of opportunity, Werribee would secure the minor premiership with a 15-3 win-loss record. After winning their first two finals, they would meet Southport Sharks in the Grand Final and after being behind at half time, would end up winning the grand final by 6 points. Jack Henderson would come home with the Norm Goss Memorial Medal as best on ground. The win broke a 31-year drought and finally fulfilled the potential they had built for many years starting pre pandemic.

Season 2025 saw Werribee fall down to 16th in the 21 team competition. Culminated by injuries and the departure of key personnel from the 2024 premiership side with 5 players all ending up on an AFL list over a 6th month period, Werribee would start the season inconsistently however still remained competitive but it became too much to overcome in the end. Allan would depart as senior coach at the end of 2025 after accepting a senior assistant coaching position with St. Kilda, and in December that year would appoint former Geelong AFLW Coach and former player Dan Lowther for season 2026.

Season 2026 saw Werribee bounce back after an aggressive off season with their recruiting. They would recover from a slow start following a few bad losses before a 9 game winning streak saw them finish 2nd on the ladder. With injuries to key players, they had a straight sets exit from the finals series.

== Honours ==
=== Club ===
Premierships
Competition	Level	Wins	Years won
Victorian Football League	Seniors	2	1993, 2024
VFA/VFL Reserves	Division 1	1	2001
VFA/VFL Reserves	Division 2	2	1987, 1988
VFA/VFL Thirds	Division 1	2	1990, 1992
Other titles and honours
Lightning Premiership	Seniors	1	1978
Finishing positions
Victorian Football League	Minor premiership	5	1991, 1998, 2001, 2005, 2024
Victorian Football League	Grand finalists	5	1991, 1998, 2001, 2005, 2023
Victorian Football League	Wooden spoons	1	1985

=== Individual ===
- J. J. Liston Trophy (7): Anthony Eames (1991), Paul Satterley (1995), Michael Frost (1998), James Podsiadly (2008), Ben Ross (2012), Tom Gribble (2019, 2022)
- Jim 'Frosty' Miller Medal (3): Jack Aziz (1993, 1996), James Podsiadly (2005)
- Fothergill–Round–Mitchell Medal (3): James Puli (1997), Michael Barlow (2009), Josh Corbett (2018), Jake Riccardi (2019), Sam Clohesy (2023)
- J. Field Medal (Division 2 Seniors League Best and Fairest) (1): Stephen Sells (1988)

== Club song ==
The club song is sung to the tune of the United States Marines Hymn.

From the playing fields of Melbourne
To the stands of Chirnside Park
We fight our battles to the end
And we'll surely leave our mark!
We're the Tigers of the VFL
And we sing in harmony;
We're the Tigers bold in black and gold
We're the boys from Werribee!
