= VFL Development League =

- Most recent season or competition: 2017 VFL season#Development League
- Formerly: VFA Second Eighteens; VFA seconds VFA reserves VFL reserves
- Sport: Australian rules football
- Founded: 1928
- First season: 1928
- Folded: 2017
- Administrator: AFL Victoria
- No. of teams: 8 (final season)
- Country: Australia
- Most titles: Coburg (18 titles)
- Related competitions: Victorian Football League
- Website: vfl.com.au

The VFL Development League, officially known as the AFL Victoria Development League and formerly known as the VFL reserves, VFA seconds/reserves and VFA Second Eighteens, was an Australian rules football competition that operated as a second-tier competition to the Victorian Football League (VFL, originally known as the VFA) from 1928 until 2017.

== History ==
The VFA Second Eighteens emerged from the Victorian Junior Football Association (VJFA), the first successful junior football competition in Melbourne which was founded in 1883. Although formally operating as the VFA's reserves competition starting in 1928, the VJFA name was retained until the end of the 1932 season.

Coinciding with the seniors VFA competition, a second reserves division was established in 1961. Clubs played in the same division as their senior teams, until the separate divisions were abolished for both grades at the end of 1988.

From its inception until 1979, the seconds team played on Saturday afternoons, playing at home when the senior team played away and vice versa.

Starting in 1980, seconds matches were played as curtain-raisers to senior matches, on Saturdays or Sundays as necessary.

The competition was later renamed the VFA reserves (becoming the VFL reserves when the competition changed its name in 1996), and then from the beginning of the 2012 season it became the VFL Development League, a move that coincided with the introduction of the AFL Victoria Development Academy which provides development opportunities for up to 25 selected VFL players per year.

Fielding a team in the reserves competition was mandatory for all senior VFA teams for most of the competition's history. Since the changes to the VFL in 2000, all AFL clubs fielding their reserves teams in the VFL seniors opted not to contest the minor grade.

Several regional clubs were unable to sustain teams, with Bendigo and North Ballarat leaving the competition at the end of the 2009 and 2013 seasons respectively.

The Development League was abolished after the 2017 season.

== Clubs ==
Eight different clubs competed in the VFL Development League's final season. They were Box Hill, Casey, Coburg, Northern Blues, Port Melbourne, Sandringham, Werribee and Williamstown.

Club	Colours	Moniker	Seasons		Div 1 flags	Div 2 flags	
Club	Colours	Moniker	First	Last	Div 1 flags	Div 2 flags	
Bendigo		Diggers, Bombers	1998	2009	0	Div 2 flags	–
Berwick		Gippslanders, Wickers	1983	1987	–	Div 2 flags	0
Box Hill		Mustangs, Hawks	1951	2017	5	0	
Brighton		Penguins	1928	1961	0	0	
Brighton-Caulfield		Penguins	1962	1964	–	0	
Brunswick–Broadmeadows (Brunswick)		Magpies	1928	1991	5	5	
Camberwell		Cobras	1928	1991	0	2	
Casey		Scorpions, Demons	1982	2017	3	1	
Caulfield		Bears	1965	1987	0	1	
Coburg		Tigers, Lions	1928	2017	18	1	
Dandenong		Dandies, Redlegs	1958	1994	1	1	
Frankston		Dolphins	1966	2016	3	1	
Geelong West		Roosters	1963	1988	0	0	
Kilsyth		Cougars	1982	1984	–	0	
Moorabbin (I)		Kangaroos	1951	1963	1	–	
Moorabbin (II)		Kangaroos, Kangas	1983	1987	–	0	
Mordialloc		Bloodhounds	1958	1988	0	0	
North Ballarat		Roosters	1996	2014	2	–	
Northcote		Dragons	1928	1987	0	5	
Northern Blues		Bullants, Blues	1928	2017	6	2	
Oakleigh		Oaks, Devils	1929	1994	1	1	
Port Melbourne		Borough	1928	2017	14	0	
Prahran		Two Blues	1928	1994	2	1	
Sandringham		Zebras	1929	2017	9	0	
Sunshine		Crows	1959	1989	0	1	
Waverley		Panthers	1961	1987	1	0	
Werribee		Tigers	1965	2017	1	2	
Williamstown		Seagulls	1928	2017	13	2	
Yarraville	(1928-29)(1930-76)(1977-83)	Eagles	1928	1983	3	2	

== Premiers ==
Coburg won the most reserves premierships, with a total of 18. The competition's final premiership was won by Casey.

Year	Premiers	Runners-up	Score	Venue	Date	Report
1928	Coburg (1)	Port Melbourne	4.5 (29) d. 1.9 (15)	Coburg City Oval	15 September 1928	
1929	Coburg (2)	Williamstown	14.16 (100) d. 14.7 (91)	Warrawee Park	28 September 1929	
1930	Coburg (3)	Preston	9.12 (66) d. 6.13 (49)	North Melbourne Recreation Reserve	4 October 1930	
1931	Brunswick (1)	Coburg	12.10 (82) d. 5.14 (44)	Preston City Oval	26 September 1931	
1932	Brunswick (2)	Coburg	13.15 (93) d. 4.13 (37)	Coburg City Oval	1 October 1932	
1933						
1934						
1935						
1936						
1937						
1938						
1939						
1940						
1941						
1942	(No season due to World War II)					
1943	(No season due to World War II)					
1944						
1945						
1946						
1947						
1948						
1949						
1950						
1951						
1952						
1953						
1954						
1955						
1956						
1957						
1958						
1959						
1960						
1961						
1962						
1963						
1964						
1965						
1966						
1967						
1968						
1969						
1970						
1971						
1972						
1973						
1974						
1975						
1976						
1977						
1978						
1979						
1980						
1981						
1982						
1983						
1984						
1985						
1986						
1987						
1988						
1989						
1990						
1991						
1992						
1993						
1994						
1995						
1996						
1997						
1998						
1999						
2000						
2001						
2002	Williamstown	Werribee	11.15 (81) d. 10.14 (74)	Princes Park	22 September 2002	
2003	Williamstown	Northern Bullants	20.15 (135) d.12.11 (83)	Princes Park	21 September 2003	
2004	Port Melbourne	Williamstown	19.13 (127) d. 8.15 (63)	Princes Park	19 September 2004	
2005	Williamstown	North Ballarat	16.7 (103) d. 12.9 (81)	Princes Park	18 September 2005	
2006	Box Hill	Williamstown	10.11 (71) d. 8.11 (59)	Princes Park	24 September 2006	
2007	Coburg	Port Melbourne	17.20 (122) d. 8.8 (56)	Princes Park	23 September 2007	
2008	Williamstown	Box Hill	16.17 (113) d. 11.16 (82)	North Port Oval	20 September 2008	
2009	Box Hill	Sandringham	16.18 (114) d. 13.8 (86)	North Port Oval	20 September 2009	
2010	Box Hill	Williamstown	17.20 (122) d. 16.9 (105)	Box Hill City Oval	11 September 2010	
2011	Box Hill	Coburg	18.10 (118) d. 7.11 (53)	North Port Oval	17 September 2011	
2012	Coburg	Box Hill	16.12 (108) d. 15.11 (101)	North Port Oval	15 September 2012	
2013	Williamstown	Box Hill	11.19 (85) d. 12.12 (84)	North Port Oval	14 September 2013	
2014	Williamstown	Box Hill	18.18 (126) d. 13.13 (91)	North Port Oval	13 September 2014	
2015	Williamstown	Box Hill	8.13 (61) d. 8.12 (60)	North Port Oval	19 September 2015	
2016	Box Hill	Casey	26.16 (172) d. 10.7 (67)	North Port Oval	18 September 2016	
2017	Casey	Williamstown	13.16 (94) d. 11.16 (82)	North Port Oval	17 September 2017	
