= 1990 VFA season =

Overview
- Teams: 14
- Premiers: Williamstown; 12th premiership
- Minor premiers: Preston; 7th minor premiership
- J. J. Liston Trophy: Matt Burrow (Preston – 14 votes); Joey Garbuio (Oakleigh – 14 votes); Steve Harkins (Port Melbourne – 14 votes); Stuart Nicol (Springvale – 14 votes)
- Leading goalkicker: Jamie Shaw (Preston – 103 goals)

The 1990 VFA season was the 109th season of the Victorian Football Association (VFA), an Australian rules football competition played in the state of Victoria.

The premiership was won by the Williamstown Football Club, after it defeated Springvale in the grand final on 30 September by two points; it was Williamstown's twelfth top-division premiership.

== Association membership ==
=== Merger between Brunswick and Broadmeadows ===
After enduring financial difficulties consistently since the early 1980s, the future of the Brunswick Football Club was uncertain at the end of the 1989 season. Its financial position was weak, its facilities at Gillon Oval were of increasingly poor quality, and it had only 300 members. At a special meeting on 2 October 1989, the club met to decide on its future, and by a large margin it decided to enter a merger with the Broadmeadows Football Club; rejected options were continuing in the VFA as a stand-alone club, folding, or merging with Sunshine. Under the terms of the merger, the new club was known as the Brunswick-Broadmeadows Magpies. It remained based at Gillon Oval, as Broadmeadows did not yet have its own home ground.

The Broadmeadows Football Club, known as the Falcons, was a club at an administrative level only. Its executive committee was established in 1987, and it had the support of the Broadmeadows council to develop a new Association-standard venue at the Johnstone Street Reserve, Jacana; but in the three years it had existed, it had never fielded a team in any suburban competition, and it did not have an existing home ground. The club was built entirely around its aspirations to play in the Association, and had made an unsuccessful bid to join for the 1988 season.

The Brunswick-Broadmeadows merger was not a successful venture. Its huge board, which comprised seven former Brunswick committeemen and seven former Broadmeadows committeemen, suffered throughout the year from factional fighting which limited its ability to operate effectively as a unified club. As a result, the club was unable to meaningfully address its debt problems during the year, it failed to meet its financial reporting commitments to the Association, and several committeemen and the general manager resigned from the club as a result of the board's ineffectiveness. On 1 August, the Association intervened; it sacked the club's board, and Association executive director Athol Hodgetts was appointed as the club's administrator. Hodgetts returned the club to a new board in September, but the club was still more than $250,000 in debt and at risk of Broadmeadows withdrawing from the merger. It was the beginning of the end for the club, which did not survive in the Association to the end of 1991.

=== Sunshine Football Club ===
After having withdrawn is senior and reserves teams midway through the 1989 season, Sunshine intended to regroup and return to the Association in 1990. Although the club believed it had restored a financial position stronger than at least five other struggling clubs in the competition, it appeared unlikely that the club would be permitted to continue as a stand-alone entity, so it proposed a merger with Brunswick to form a new club which would have been known as the Sunshine Magpies; but, on 2 October, Brunswick voted instead to merge with Broadmeadows. A new opportunity for the club's survival emerged on 3 October, when it was announced that League clubs Fitzroy and Footscray were merging, with the new Fitzroy Bulldogs club to play at Princes Park, North Carlton; this temporarily made Sunshine the only League or Association football team remaining in the inner western suburbs, giving it the chance to win over former Footscray fans, or enter a partnership with a new Footscray-based Association club; however, there was a strong and successful fightback campaign from local residents and businesses which not only kept Footscray as an independent League club, but also drew attention and local support away from Sunshine's efforts to consolidate its own viability. On 25 October, two days after the Fitzroy Bulldogs merger collapsed, the Association terminated Sunshine's licence. The club continued preparations for the 1990 season in the hope that it could convince the Association to change its mind, but this did not happen, bringing an end to Sunshine's 31-year stint in the competition.

== Home-and-away season ==
In the home-and-away season, each team played eighteen games; the top five then contested the finals under the McIntyre final five system. The primary finals venue was North Port Oval, and the grand final was played at Princes Park.

== Ladder ==
Pos	Team	Pld	W	L	D	PF	PA	PP	Pts
1	Preston	18	13	4	1	2188	1774	123.3	54
2	Springvale	18	13	5	0	2214	1828	121.1	52
3	Coburg	18	13	5	0	2105	1760	119.6	52
4	Williamstown (P)	18	12	6	0	2130	1539	138.4	48
5	Werribee	18	12	6	0	2257	1823	123.8	48
6	Dandenong	18	10	7	1	2122	1678	126.5	42
7	Frankston	18	10	8	0	2077	1988	104.5	40
8	Sandringham	18	9	9	0	2154	2200	97.9	36
9	Box Hill	18	8	10	0	2242	2142	104.7	32
10	Brunswick-Broadmeadows	18	8	10	0	1867	1856	100.6	32
11	Port Melbourne	18	8	10	0	2026	2247	90.2	32
12	Prahran	18	5	13	0	1775	2148	82.6	20
13	Oakleigh	18	4	14	0	1936	2460	78.7	16
14	Camberwell	18	0	18	0	1330	3010	44.2	0

Rules for classification: 1) points; 2) percentage; 3) number of points for.
(P) Premiers

== Finals ==
	Qualifying final
Saturday, 1 September	Springvale 23.19 (157)	def.	Coburg 12.12 (84)	North Port Oval (crowd: 4,000)

	Elimination Final
Sunday, 2 September	Williamstown 23.17 (155)	def.	Werribee 16.14 (110)	North Port Oval (crowd: 4,523)

	First semi-final
Saturday, 8 September	Coburg 8.12 (60)	def. by	Williamstown 14.21 (105)	North Port Oval (crowd: 4,924)

	Second semi-final
Sunday, 9 September	Preston 9.11 (65)	def. by	Springvale 24.15 (159)	North Port Oval (crowd: 3,533)

	Preliminary Final
Sunday, 16 September	Preston 15.6 (96)	def. by	Williamstown 23.15 (153)	North Port Oval (crowd: 7,494)

=== Grand Final ===
1990 VFA Grand Final
Sunday, 30 September	Springvale	def. by	Williamstown	Princes Park (crowd: 18,634)
2.5 (17); 8.11 (59); 13.15 (93); 15.15 (105)	Q1; Q2; Q3; Final	5.4 (34); 6.4 (40); 10.5 (65); 16.11 (107)	Umpires: B. Bulluss, J. Russo; Norm Goss Memorial Medal: Barry Round (Williamstown)
Robinson 4, Maloni 3, Dempster 2, Dudley 2, Phillips 2, Jeffs, Maylin	Goals	Rickman 4, Johansen 3, Minett 3, Aziz, Gould, Muschialli, O'Connor, Smith, Swan
Meade (concussion); Phillips (unspecified)	Injuries

== Notable events ==
=== Interleague matches ===
The Association played one interleague match, against the Australian Capital Territory, during the 1990 season. Phil Cleary (Coburg) was coach of the Association team, and Brett McTaggart (Williamstown) was captain.

	1990 Interleague matches
Sunday, 10 June	A.C.T. 13.14 (92)	def. by	V.F.A. 21.11 (137)	Football Park, Phillip (crowd: 5,000)

=== Other notable events ===
- Freight company Wards Express, a subsidiary of Mayne Nickless, signed on as the new major sponsor of the Association, replacing ANA Friendly Societies. The premiership trophy became known as the Mayne Nickless Premiership Cup under the arrangement.
- Camberwell and Oakleigh both faced financial difficulties during the 1990 season. Oakleigh needed to raise $50,000 by the end of the season to avoid folding, mostly owing to debts left over from over-spending during the 1970s; and Camberwell, more than $100,000 in debt and unable to pay its players, established the "Save the Cobras" campaign to re-establish community support and remain afloat.
- In the televised match-of-the-round on 7 July, Brunswick-Broadmeadows fell just short of overcoming a 70-point three-quarter time deficit against Preston. Preston 18.13 (121) led Brunswick-Broadmeadows 7.9 (51) at three-quarter time, but Brunswick-Broadmeadows kicked first eleven goals of the final quarter, including six goals in eight minutes, to draw within three points of Preston; Preston's Adrian Marcon kicked a goal in the 27th minute to steady the game for Preston; Preston 19.15 (129) d. Brunswick-Broadmeadows 18.12 (120).
- For the first time, the Melbourne City Council gave its approval for the Association to stage the grand final at Princes Park. The Association had tried to move the grand final to Princes Park from as early as 1979, but had always previously faced opposition to Sunday football from the council.

== Awards ==
- The leading goalkicker for the season was Jamie Shaw (Preston), who kicked 103 goals during the season, including finals.
- The J. J. Liston Trophy was won in a four-way tie by Matt Burrows (Preston), Joey Garbuio (Oakleigh), Steve Harkins (Port Melbourne) and Stuart Nicol (Springvale), who all polled 14 votes. As of 2023, it ìs the most players to tie for the Liston Trophy in a single year.
- The Fothergill–Round Medal was won by Mathew Quirk (Oakleigh).
- Coburg won the seconds premiership. Coburg 34.16 (220) defeated Prahran 19.18 (132) in the grand final, held as a curtain-raiser to the Seniors Grand Final on 30 September.
