= 1998 VFL season =

1998 VFL Premiership Season
- Teams: 11
- Premiers: Springvale (4th premiership)
- Minor premiers: Werribee (2nd minor premiership)

The 1998 Victorian Football League season was the 117th season of the Australian rules football competition. The premiership was won by the Springvale Football Club, after it defeated Werribee by 38 points in the Grand Final on 20 September. It was Springvale's fourth top division premiership, and the third of four premierships it won in the five years from 1995 to 1999.

== League membership ==
There were two changes to the membership of the VFL for the 1998 season: the Bendigo Diggers were admitted and the Traralgon Maroons departed. The Preston Knights were excluded from the league in October 1997, but were reinstated the following month. Strategically, the Victorian State Football League desired to fully align the VFL with the statewide under-18s competition (the TAC Cup), with twelve clubs in each competition and one VFL clubs aligned with each TAC Cup club, and the changes were in large part driven by these motivations.

=== Bendigo ===
At this time, there were two regional TAC Cup clubs with no VFL affiliate: the Bendigo Pioneers and the Murray Bushrangers. In early 1997, the VSFL granted a licence to the Bendigo Football Club to enter a team from the 1998 season and to be aligned with the Pioneers. The club was newly established, unlike the VFL's other two regional teams – North Ballarat and Traralgon – who had been strong clubs in their local competitions. The club wore blue and gold and took the nickname Diggers.

=== Traralgon ===
As a condition of its entry to the VFL in 1996, Traralgon had always intended to allow the members another vote on whether to stay in the VFL or return to the Latrobe Valley Football League after two seasons. In those first two seasons, Traralgon had achieved little on-field success (a win–loss record of 4–31–1); off-field, its average home crowd of 1,200 was among the best in the league, but its finances were stretched due to extra travel and difficulties attracting the necessary sponsorship. There was division within the Traralgon board, with different news reports indicating the board recommending staying or leaving. Ultimately, when the vote took place at the end of November 1997, the members voted in favour of departing, and the club returned to the LTFL.

Less than a day after Traralgon's departure was announced, a new group which included some members of the Traralgon board formed a new Gippsland Power senior football club board and applied to join the VFL as a replacement for Traralgon, but this never eventuated and the VFL has since remained without Gippsland representation.

=== Preston ===
On 21 October 1997, the VSFL announced that it would not grant Preston a VFL licence for the 1998 season. As had been the case with the attempted expulsion of Werribee two years earlier, the decision came from the VSFL's desire to reduce the number of metropolitan teams from nine to eight to align it with the eight TAC Cup clubs from the greater Melbourne and Geelong region. It was intended that the Northern Knights TAC Cup team would be reallocated from Preston to Port Melbourne, and that the Geelong Falcons TAC Cup team would be reallocated from Port Melbourne to Werribee (which at that time had no affiliated TAC Cup team). The VSFL had reportedly debated whether Preston or Coburg would be the eliminated club, with the latter retained largely due to its superior playing facilities.

Preston had been struggling through the 1990s, with no on-field success and difficulty retaining players, and it had courted former VFA club Prahran during the year to consider an administrative merger to help its finances. Nevertheless, it fought to regain its licence, and in a meeting on 8 November it obtained agreement from the VSFL to delay its final decision and allow the club time to campaign for reinstatement. Over the subsequent weeks, the club gained the support of the Darebin Council to upgrade its Preston City Oval facilities.

Ultimately, it was Traralgon's departure at the end of November that had the most significant part to play in Preston's licence being reinstated. With no Gippsland-based team to serve as Gippsland Power's affiliate, the VSFL was faced with the prospect of having to align the Power with a metropolitan club, which would remove the need to eliminate the ninth metropolitan club. In moves which took place before 1999, Gippsland Power was allocated to Springvale; the Oakleigh Chargers were reallocated from Springvale to Port Melbourne; and the Geelong Falcons were reallocated from Port Melbourne to Werribee. Preston then remained in the league as the Northern Knights' affiliate.

== Premiership season ==
=== Ladder ===
1998 VFL season
Pos	Team	Pld	W	L	D	PF	PA	PP	Pts	
1	Werribee	18	16	2	0	1938	1182	164.0	64	Finals
2	Frankston	18	16	2	0	1826	1292	141.3	64	Finals
3	Springvale (P)	18	11	7	0	1795	1177	152.5	44	Finals
4	North Ballarat	18	10	7	1	1389	1324	104.9	42	Finals
5	Preston	18	10	8	0	1346	1443	93.3	40	Finals
6	Sandringham	18	9	9	0	1294	1387	93.3	36	Finals
7	Williamstown	18	8	10	0	1446	1557	92.9	32	
8	Port Melbourne	18	7	10	1	1450	1395	103.9	30	
9	Box Hill	18	5	13	0	1404	1746	80.4	20	
10	Bendigo	18	4	14	0	1333	1808	73.7	16	
11	Coburg	18	2	16	0	995	1905	52.2	8	

Rules for classification: 1) points; 2) percentage; 3) number of points for.
(P) Premiers

=== Finals ===
	Qualifying final
Saturday, 29 August (2:00 pm)	Werribee 17.16 (118)	def.	Frankston 13.13 (91)	North Port Oval

	First Elimination final
Sunday, 30 August (2:00 pm)	North Ballarat 13.9 (87)	def.	Preston 8.11 (59)	Northern Oval

	Second Elimination final
Sunday, 30 August (2:00 pm)	Springvale 15.16 (106)	def.	Sandringham 5.8 (38)	North Port Oval

	First semi-final
Sunday, 6 September (2:00pm)	North Ballarat 19.6 (120)	def.	Frankston 17.13 (115)	North Port Oval

	Second semi-final
Saturday, 5 September (2:00pm)	Werribee 19.13 (127)	def.	Springvale 7.14 (56)	North Port Oval

	Preliminary Final
Sunday, 13 September (2:00pm)	Springvale 9.10 (64)	def.	North Ballarat 9.8 (62)	North Port Oval

=== Grand Final ===
1998 VFL Grand Final
Sunday 20 September (2:00 pm)	Werribee	def. by	Springvale	North Port Oval (crowd: 8,672)
1.4 (10); 2.8 (20); 5.12 (42); 5.15 (45)	Q1; Q2; Q3; Final	2.7 (19); 6.9 (45); 9.10 (64); 11.17 (83)	Umpires: James, Kelsey, Rowe; Norm Goss Memorial Medal: Ben Delarue (Springvale)
Camilleri, Frost, C. Gowans, Satterley, Whitnall	Goals	Smith 3, Caples 2, Knight 2, O'Brien, O'Donnell, Shipp, Taylor

=== Awards ===
- The leading goalkicker for the season for the second consecutive season was Shayne Smith (Springvale), who kicked 78 goals.
- The J. J. Liston Trophy was won by Michael Frost (Werribee). Frost polled 32 votes, which as of 2019 holds the record for the most votes since the modern voting method was adopted in 1982.
- The Fothergill–Round Medal was won by Andrew Shipp (Springvale).
- North Ballarat won the reserves premiership. North Ballarat 14.9 (93) defeated Frankston 6.4 (40) in the Grand Final, held as a curtain-raiser to the Seniors Grand Final on 20 September.

== See also ==
- List of VFA/VFL premiers
- Australian rules football
- Victorian Football League
- Australian Football League
