= 2016 VFL season =

135th season of the Victorian Football League

- Teams: 15
- Premiers: Footscray reserves 2nd premiership
- Minor premiers: Casey Scorpions; 4th minor premiership
- Leading goalkicker: Ahmed Saad (Coburg) 49 goals
- Matches played: 144

The 2016 VFL season was the 135th season of the Victorian Football League (VFL), a second-tier Australian rules football competition played in the state of Victoria.

The season started on Saturday 9 April and concluded Sunday 25 September with the VFL Grand Final, won by the Footscray reserves, who defeated the Casey Scorpions by 31 points at Etihad Stadium. It was the Footscray reserves' second VFL premiership, won in just its third season in the competition.

== League membership and affiliations ==
At the end of the 2015 season, North Melbourne ended its ten-year partial reserves affiliation with North Ballarat. The move was in part motivated by a burgeoning partnership between the City of Ballarat and North Melbourne's AFL rivals Western Bulldogs, with North Melbourne not wishing to continue its investment in the Ballarat area if the rewards were to be reaped by another club. North Melbourne's existing partial affiliation with Werribee was upgraded to a full affiliation, and North Ballarat continued to contest the VFL as a stand-alone senior club.

Beginning in 2016, a new statewide women's football league known as VFL Women's (VFLW) was established by AFL Victoria. The competition was formed from clubs previously established in the Victorian Women's Football League, and was aligned and co-branded with the VFL to improve market penetration.

== Home-and-away season ==
=== Round 1 ===
	Round 1
Saturday, 9 April (12:00pm)	Essendon 12.12 (84)	def. by	Werribee 16.6 (102)	Windy Hill	Report
Saturday, 9 April (2:00pm)	Box Hill 18.10 (118)	def.	Sandringham 12.9 (81)	Box Hill City Oval (crowd: 1,342)	Report
Saturday, 9 April (2:00pm)	Coburg 11.9 (75)	def. by	North Ballarat 12.9 (81)	Piranha Park	Report
Saturday, 9 April (7:00pm)	Casey 27.17 (179)	def.	Frankston 5.5 (35)	Casey Fields	Report
Sunday, 10 April (11:00am)	Footscray 15.14 (104)	def.	Northern Blues 8.7 (55)	VU Whitten Oval	Report
Sunday, 10 April (11:40am)	Port Melbourne 10.13 (73)	def. by	Collingwood 14.13 (97)	North Port Oval	Report
Sunday, 10 April (2:00pm)	Williamstown 16.13 (109)	def.	Richmond 9.10 (64)	Burbank Oval	Report
	Bye; Geelong

=== Round 2 ===
	Round 2
Friday, 15 April (7:00pm)	Geelong 14.6 (90)	def. by	Northern Blues 16.8 (104)	Simonds Stadium	Report
Friday, 15 April (7:30pm)	Essendon 18.16 (124)	def.	North Ballarat 5.9 (39)	Queen Elizabeth Oval	Report
Saturday, 16 April (12:00pm)	Richmond 17.10 (112)	def.	Footscray 7.18 (60)	Punt Road Oval	Report
Saturday, 16 April (2:00pm)	Port Melbourne 12.12 (84)	def.	Coburg 11.8 (74)	North Port Oval	Report
Sunday, 17 April (11:40am)	Williamstown 14.13 (97)	def. by	Box Hill 17.10 (112)	Burbank Oval	Report
Sunday, 17 April (11:45am)	Collingwood 10.5 (65)	def. by	Casey 18.13 (121)	Holden Centre	Report
Sunday, 17 April (2:00pm)	Frankston 10.3 (63)	def. by	Werribee 15.11 (101)	Frankston Park	Report
	Bye; Sandringham

=== Round 3 ===
	Round 3
Friday, 22 April (7:00pm)	North Ballarat 5.7 (37)	def. by	Geelong 16.15 (111)	Eureka Stadium	Report
Saturday, 23 April (2:00pm)	Frankston 14.15 (99)	def.	Richmond 13.8 (86)	Frankston Park	Report
Saturday, 23 April (2:00pm)	Coburg 11.12 (78)	def. by	Box Hill 13.8 (86)	Piranha Park (crowd: 1,405)
Saturday, 23 April (2:00pm)	Northern Blues 8.8 (56)	def. by	Port Melbourne 10.15 (75)	Preston City Oval
Saturday, 23 April (2:00pm)	Sandringham 18.9 (117)	def.	Footscray 12.17 (89)	Trevor Barker Oval	Report
Saturday, 23 April (7:00pm)	Casey 11.4 (70)	def. by	Williamstown 17.12 (114)	Casey Fields	Report
Sunday, 24 April (2:10pm)	Collingwood 7.8 (48)	def. by	Essendon 20.13 (133)	Victoria Park	Report
	Bye; Werribee
Frankston recorded its first win since round 16 of the 2014 season, breaking a 24-match losing streak.

=== Round 4 ===
	Round 4
Saturday, 30 April (12:00pm)	Footscray 12.13 (85)	def. by	Werribee 19.13 (127)	VU Whitten Oval	Report
Saturday, 30 April (2:00pm)	Northern Blues 13.13 (91)	def. by	Collingwood 14.16 (100)	Preston City Oval	Report
Saturday, 30 April (4:30pm)	Richmond 7.12 (54)	def. by	Sandringham 16.15 (111)	Punt Road Oval	Report
Sunday, 1 May (11:40am)	Williamstown 8.4 (52)	def.	Port Melbourne 5.15 (45)	Burbank Oval	Report
Sunday, 1 May (12:00pm)	Essendon 7.12 (54)	def. by	Casey 10.11 (71)	Windy Hill	Report
Sunday, 1 May (1:00pm)	Geelong 15.12 (102)	def.	Coburg 10.7 (67)	Simonds Stadium	Report
Sunday, 1 May (2:00pm)	Box Hill 14.14 (98)	def.	Frankston 5.9 (39)	Box Hill City Oval (crowd: 911)	Report
	Bye; North Ballarat

=== Round 5 ===
	Round 5
Saturday, 7 May (12:00pm)	Essendon 16.9 (105)	def.	Geelong 12.12 (84)	Windy Hill	Report
Saturday, 7 May (2:00pm)	Port Melbourne 13.16 (94)	def.	Richmond 8.3 (51)	North Port Oval	Report
Saturday, 7 May (4:50pm)	Collingwood 7.5 (47)	def. by	Sandringham 16.18 (114)	Holden Centre	Report
Saturday, 7 May (7:00pm)	Werribee 9.9 (63)	def. by	Williamstown 20.17 (137)	Avalon Airport Oval	Report
Sunday, 8 May (11:40am)	Footscray 20.21 (141)	def.	North Ballarat 5.6 (36)	VU Whitten Oval	Report
Sunday, 8 May (2:00pm)	Casey 19.11 (125)	def.	Northern Blues 2.6 (18)	Casey Fields	Report
Sunday, 8 May (2:00pm)	Frankston 8.13 (61)	def.	Coburg 7.14 (56)	Frankston Park	Report
	Bye; Box Hill

=== Round 6 ===
	Round 6
Saturday, 14 May (1:00pm)	Geelong 6.8 (44)	def. by	Collingwood 8.16 (64)	Simonds Stadium	Report
Saturday, 14 May (2:00pm)	Williamstown 25.22 (172)	def.	Northern Blues 3.11 (29)	Burbank Oval	Report
Saturday, 14 May (2:00pm)	Port Melbourne 8.10 (58)	def. by	Footscray 11.11 (77)	North Port Oval	Report
Saturday, 14 May (2:00pm)	Sandringham 16.6 (102)	def. by	Casey 19.19 (133)	Trevor Barker Oval	Report
Saturday, 14 May (4:30pm)	Richmond 21.16 (142)	def.	North Ballarat 10.3 (63)	Punt Road Oval	Report
Sunday, 15 May (11:40am)	Werribee 10.10 (70)	def.	Box Hill 9.14 (68)	Avalon Airport Oval	Report
Sunday, 15 May (2:00pm)	Coburg 16.7 (103)	def.	Essendon 11.6 (72)	Piranha Park (crowd: 1,376)	Report
	Bye; Frankston

=== Round 7 ===
	Round 7
Saturday, 21 May (4:50pm)	Collingwood 13.8 (86)	def.	Williamstown 12.9 (81)	Holden Centre	Report
Saturday, 21 May (7:00pm)	Casey 12.11 (83)	def.	Box Hill 11.10 (76)	Casey Fields	Report
Saturday, 21 May (7:00pm)	North Ballarat 14.4 (88)	def. by	Port Melbourne 15.7 (97)	Eureka Stadium	Report
Sunday, 22 May (11:40am)	Frankston 10.8 (68)	def. by	Geelong 16.9 (105)	Frankston Park	Report
Sunday, 22 May (12:00pm)	Essendon 12.9 (81)	def. by	Footscray 15.10 (100)	Windy Hill	Report
Sunday, 22 May (2:00pm)	Northern Blues 16.10 (106)	def.	Coburg 14.11 (95)	Preston City Oval
Sunday, 22 May (2:00pm)	Sandringham 17.18 (120)	def.	Werribee 12.11 (83)	Trevor Barker Oval
	Bye; Richmond

=== Round 8 ===
	Round 8
Saturday, 28 May (4:00pm)	Richmond 5.14 (44)	def. by	Essendon 9.13 (67)	Punt Road Oval	Report
	Bye; Box Hill, Casey, Coburg, Collingwood, Footscray, Frankston, Geelong, North Ballarat, Northern Blues, Port Melbourne, Sandringham, Werribee, Williamstown

=== Round 9 ===
	Round 9
Saturday, 4 June (2:00pm)	Werribee 9.5 (59)	def. by	Collingwood 13.10 (88)	Avalon Airport Oval	Report
Sunday, 5 June (11:00am)	Footscray 7.14 (56)	def. by	Williamstown 19.14 (128)	VU Whitten Oval	Report
Sunday, 5 June (11:40am)	Coburg 9.10 (64)	def.	Richmond 3.13 (31)	Piranha Park (crowd: 561)	Report
Sunday, 5 June (1:00pm)	Geelong 15.9 (99)	def. by	Sandringham 15.11 (101)	Simonds Stadium	Report
Sunday, 5 June (2:00pm)	Box Hill 12.18 (90)	def.	North Ballarat 9.9 (63)	Box Hill City Oval (crowd: 756)	Report
Sunday, 5 June (2:00pm)	Casey 12.14 (86)	def.	Port Melbourne 7.9 (51)	Casey Fields	Report
Sunday, 5 June (2:00pm)	Northern Blues 15.15 (105)	def.	Frankston 9.11 (65)	Ikon Park
	Bye; Essendon

=== Round 10 ===
	Round 10
Saturday, 11 June (11:00am)	Footscray 9.13 (67)	def.	Geelong 8.12 (60)	VU Whitten Oval	Report
Saturday, 11 June (1:00pm)	North Ballarat 7.20 (62)	def. by	Coburg 14.8 (92)	Etihad Stadium	Report
Saturday, 11 June (2:00pm)	Box Hill 10.7 (67)	def. by	Northern Blues 15.13 (103)	Box Hill City Oval (crowd: 1,446)	Report
Saturday, 11 June (2:00pm)	Williamstown 10.17 (77)	def.	Frankston 6.11 (47)	Burbank Oval	Report
Saturday, 11 June (2:10pm)	Casey 2.7 (19)	def. by	Collingwood 8.11 (59)	Casey Fields	Report
Sunday, 12 June (11:40am)	Sandringham 15.13 (103)	def.	Essendon 9.21 (75)	Trevor Barker Oval	Report
Sunday, 12 June (2:00pm)	Richmond 11.15 (81)	def.	Werribee 6.14 (50)	Punt Road Oval	Report
	Bye; Port Melbourne

=== Round 11 ===
	Round 11
Saturday, 18 June (2:00pm)	North Ballarat 7.2 (44)	def. by	Casey 19.21 (135)	Eureka Stadium	Report
Saturday, 18 June (2:00pm)	Werribee 13.15 (93)	def. by	Essendon 16.10 (106)	Avalon Airport Oval	Report
Saturday, 18 June (2:00pm)	Coburg 11.11 (77)	def. by	Port Melbourne 16.12 (108)	Piranha Park
Sunday, 19 June (2:00pm)	Frankston 13.3 (81)	def. by	Footscray 13.13 (91)	Frankston Park	Report
Sunday, 19 June (2:10pm)	Geelong 18.10 (118)	def.	Box Hill 10.9 (69)	Simonds Stadium	Report
	Bye; Collingwood, Northern Blues, Richmond, Sandringham, Williamstown

=== Round 12 ===
	Round 12
Saturday, 25 June (2:00pm)	Werribee 9.5 (59)	def. by	Coburg 9.19 (73)	Avalon Airport Oval	Report
Saturday, 25 June (2:00pm)	Frankston 10.8 (68)	def. by	North Ballarat 11.9 (75)	Frankston Park
Saturday, 25 June (2:00pm)	Port Melbourne 10.11 (71)	def.	Box Hill 7.13 (55)	North Port Oval
Saturday, 25 June (2:10pm)	Northern Blues 9.8 (62)	def. by	Sandringham 13.24 (102)	Ikon Park
Sunday, 26 June (2:00pm)	Williamstown 5.17 (47)	def. by	Geelong 10.3 (63)	Burbank Oval
Sunday, 26 June (2:10pm)	Collingwood 14.12 (96)	def.	Richmond 10.10 (70)	Holden Centre	Report
	Bye; Casey, Essendon, Footscray

=== Round 13 ===
	Round 13
Saturday, 2 July (1:00pm)	Coburg 13.7 (85)	def.	Footscray 9.19 (73)	Piranha Park	Report
Saturday, 2 July (2:10pm)	Essendon 10.13 (73)	def. by	Port Melbourne 12.8 (80)	Windy Hill	Report
Saturday, 2 July (4:00pm)	Collingwood 15.9 (99)	def.	Northern Blues 13.8 (86)	Holden Centre	Report
Sunday, 3 July (2:00pm)	Williamstown 14.19 (103)	def.	North Ballarat 11.9 (75)	Burbank Oval	Report
Sunday, 3 July (2:00pm)	Sandringham 16.20 (116)	def.	Frankston 9.2 (56)	Trevor Barker Oval
Sunday, 3 July (2:10pm)	Richmond 11.10 (76)	def. by	Casey 11.12 (78)	Punt Road Oval
	Bye; Box Hill, Geelong, Werribee

=== Round 14 ===
	Round 14
Saturday, 9 July (2:00pm)	Box Hill 12.8 (80)	def. by	Williamstown 13.12 (90)	Box Hill City Oval (crowd: 1,331)	Report
Saturday, 9 July (2:00pm)	Northern Blues 8.11 (59)	def. by	Geelong 19.11 (125)	Preston City Oval
Saturday, 9 July (2:00pm)	Coburg 5.6 (36)	def. by	Sandringham 12.13 (85)	Piranha Park	Report
Saturday, 9 July (2:00pm)	Footscray 11.8 (74)	def.	Richmond 9.11 (65)	VU Whitten Oval	Report
Sunday, 10 July (11:40am)	Port Melbourne 9.20 (74)	def.	Werribee 10.7 (67)	North Port Oval
Sunday, 10 July (1:00pm)	North Ballarat 2.7 (19)	def. by	Collingwood 13.12 (90)	Eureka Stadium	Report
Sunday, 10 July (2:00pm)	Frankston 12.12 (84)	def. by	Essendon 16.11 (107)	Frankston Park
	Bye; Casey

=== Round 15 ===
	Round 15
Saturday, 16 July (11:00am)	Essendon 15.5 (95)	def.	Box Hill 13.14 (92)	Windy Hill	Report
Saturday, 16 July (12:00pm)	Geelong 25.16 (166)	def.	Werribee 8.7 (55)	Simonds Stadium	Report
Saturday, 16 July (1:00pm)	North Ballarat 11.15 (81)	def. by	Northern Blues 17.10 (112)	Eureka Stadium
Sunday, 17 July (11:40am)	Footscray 12.12 (84)	def.	Casey 13.5 (83)	VU Whitten Oval	Report
Sunday, 17 July (2:00pm)	Williamstown 11.19 (85)	def.	Coburg 7.5 (47)	Burbank Oval	Report
Sunday, 17 July (2:00pm)	Frankston 12.5 (77)	def. by	Collingwood 22.11 (143)	Frankston Park	Report
Sunday, 17 July (2:00pm)	Sandringham 9.6 (60)	def. by	Port Melbourne 11.16 (82)	Trevor Barker Oval	Report
	Bye; Richmond

=== Round 16 ===
	Round 16
Saturday, 23 July (2:00pm)	Werribee 10.11 (71)	def.	North Ballarat 8.12 (60)	Avalon Airport Oval	Report
Saturday, 23 July (2:00pm)	Port Melbourne 10.3 (63)	def. by	Williamstown 14.12 (96)	North Port Oval	Report
Sunday, 24 July (11:40am)	Casey 12.20 (92)	def.	Sandringham 7.4 (46)	Casey Fields	Report
Sunday, 24 July (12:30pm)	Richmond 13.7 (85)	def.	Box Hill 10.9 (69)	Punt Road Oval	Report
Sunday, 24 July (1:00pm)	Geelong 15.22 (112)	def.	Essendon 5.4 (34)	Simonds Stadium	Report
Sunday, 24 July (2:00pm)	Northern Blues 11.11 (77)	def.	Footscray 10.11 (71)	Ikon Park	Report
	Bye; Coburg, Collingwood, Frankston

=== Round 17 ===
	Round 17
Saturday, 30 July (11:00am)	Richmond 11.15 (81)	def.	Frankston 7.8 (50)	Punt Road Oval
Saturday, 30 July (12:00pm)	Collingwood 13.14 (92)	def.	Geelong 5.12 (42)	Victoria Park	Report
Saturday, 30 July (12:00pm)	Footscray 10.13 (73)	def.	Box Hill 10.8 (68)	VU Whitten Oval	Report
Saturday, 30 July (2:00pm)	Port Melbourne 12.20 (92)	def.	North Ballarat 13.1 (79)	Frankston Park
Saturday, 30 July (2:00pm)	Coburg 6.2 (38)	def. by	Casey 16.20 (116)	Piranha Park	Report
Sunday, 31 July (11:40am)	Werribee 25.15 (165)	def.	Northern Blues 15.12 (102)	Avalon Airport Oval
Sunday, 31 July (2:00pm)	Sandringham 6.22 (58)	def. by	Williamstown 11.16 (82)	Trevor Barker Oval
	Bye; Essendon

=== Round 18 ===
	Round 18
Saturday, 6 August (11:30am)	Geelong 23.8 (146)	def.	Frankston 7.3 (45)	Simonds Stadium	Report
Saturday, 6 August (1:00pm)	North Ballarat 11.8 (74)	def. by	Sandringham 19.13 (127)	Eureka Stadium
Saturday, 6 August (1:00pm)	Collingwood 19.18 (132)	def.	Coburg 10.4 (64)	Victoria Park	Report
Saturday, 6 August (2:00pm)	Northern Blues 13.3 (81)	def. by	Richmond 19.11 (125)	Ikon Park	Report
Saturday, 6 August (7:00pm)	Casey 20.9 (129)	def.	Essendon 6.7 (43)	Casey Fields	Report
Sunday, 7 August (2:00pm)	Box Hill 13.20 (98)	def.	Werribee 9.7 (61)	Box Hill City Oval (crowd: 1,170)	Report
Sunday, 7 August (2:00pm)	Williamstown 11.11 (77)	def. by	Footscray 12.9 (81)	Burbank Oval	Report
	Bye; Port Melbourne

=== Round 19 ===
	Round 19
Saturday, 13 August (1:00pm)	Collingwood 12.12 (84)	def.	Port Melbourne 10.8 (68)	Victoria Park	Report
Saturday, 13 August (2:00pm)	Coburg 13.13 (91)	def.	Frankston 11.13 (79)	Piranha Park (crowd: 505)	Report
Sunday, 14 August (12:00pm)	Essendon 18.11 (119)	def.	Williamstown 15.11 (101)	Windy Hill	Report
Sunday, 14 August (2:00pm)	Casey 21.25 (151)	def.	Werribee 7.4 (46)	Casey Fields	Report
Sunday, 14 August (2:00pm)	Sandringham 9.15 (69)	def. by	Box Hill 13.13 (91)	Trevor Barker Oval	Report
Sunday, 14 August (5:00pm)	Richmond 11.16 (82)	def.	Geelong 6.9 (45)	Punt Road Oval	Report
	Bye; Footscray, North Ballarat, Northern Blues

=== Round 20 ===
	Round 20
Saturday, 20 August (1:00pm)	Box Hill 7.15 (57)	def. by	Collingwood 12.6 (78)	Box Hill City Oval (crowd: 1,708)	Report
Saturday, 20 August (2:00pm)	Northern Blues 6.7 (43)	def. by	Williamstown 13.20 (98)	Ikon Park	Report
Saturday, 20 August (2:30pm)	North Ballarat 3.16 (34)	def. by	Essendon 15.10 (100)	Eureka Stadium	Report
Sunday, 21 August (11:00am)	Geelong 13.5 (83)	def.	Casey 10.12 (72)	Simonds Stadium	Report
Sunday, 21 August (12:00pm)	Werribee 9.10 (64)	def. by	Footscray 18.19 (127)	Avalon Airport Oval	Report
Sunday, 21 August (2:00pm)	Frankston 8.10 (58)	def. by	Port Melbourne 16.8 (104)	Frankston Park	Report
Sunday, 21 August (2:15pm)	Sandringham 12.17 (89)	def. by	Richmond 14.14 (98)	Trevor Barker Oval	Report
	Bye; Coburg

=== Round 21 ===
	Round 21
Saturday, 27 August (11:00am)	Essendon 19.18 (132)	def.	Northern Blues 8.10 (58)	Windy Hill	Report
Saturday, 27 August (12:00pm)	Richmond 20.15 (135)	def.	Coburg 6.8 (44)	Punt Road Oval	Report
Saturday, 27 August (12:00pm)	Footscray 16.9 (105)	def.	Collingwood 10.13 (73)	VU Whitten Oval	Report
Saturday, 27 August (1:00pm)	North Ballarat 8.18 (66)	def.	Frankston 8.8 (56)	Eureka Stadium
Saturday, 27 August (2:00pm)	Box Hill 8.8 (56)	def. by	Casey 11.20 (86)	Box Hill City Oval (crowd: 1,106)	Report
Sunday, 28 August (11:40am)	Port Melbourne 9.10 (64)	def. by	Geelong 15.9 (99)	VU Whitten Oval	Report
Sunday, 28 August (2:00pm)	Werribee 14.10 (94)	def.	Sandringham 10.14 (74)	Avalon Airport Oval	Report
	Bye; Williamstown

== Ladder ==
Pos	Team	Pld	W	L	D	PF	PA	PP	Pts	Qualification
1	Casey	18	14	4	0	1829	1090	167.8	56	Finals series
2	Collingwood	18	14	4	0	1541	1323	116.5	56	Finals series
3	Williamstown	18	13	5	0	1746	1201	145.4	52	Finals series
4	Footscray (P)	18	12	6	0	1558	1447	107.7	48	Finals series
5	Geelong	18	11	7	0	1694	1232	137.5	44	Finals series
6	Port Melbourne	18	11	7	0	1383	1329	104.1	44	Finals series
7	Sandringham	18	10	8	0	1675	1465	114.3	40	Finals series
8	Essendon	18	10	8	0	1603	1477	108.5	40	Finals series
9	Richmond	18	9	9	0	1482	1343	110.3	36	
10	Box Hill	18	7	11	0	1450	1440	100.7	28	
11	Werribee	18	7	11	0	1430	1757	81.4	28	
12	Coburg	18	6	12	0	1259	1557	80.9	24	
13	Northern Blues	18	6	12	0	1347	1890	71.3	24	
14	North Ballarat	18	3	15	0	1076	1826	58.9	12	
15	Frankston	18	2	16	0	1131	1827	61.9	8	

Source: Fox Sports Pulse
Rules for classification: 1) points; 2) percentage; 3) number of points for.

== Finals series ==
Qualifying and elimination finals
3 Sep, Casey Fields
1	Casey	20.8 (128)
4	Footscray	8.10 (58)
3 Sep, North Port Oval
5	Geelong	17.8 (110)
8	Essendon	21.6 (132)
4 Sep, North Port Oval
6	Port Melbourne	15.10 (100)
7	Sandringham	22.13 (145)
3 Sep, Ikon Park
2	Collingwood	16.6 (102)
3	Williamstown	7.14 (56)

Semi-finals
11 Sep, North Port Oval
Footscray	13.16 (94)
Essendon	10.15 (75)
10 Sep, North Port Oval
Williamstown	14.11 (95)
Sandringham	7.7 (49)

Preliminary finals
18 Sep, North Port Oval
Casey	12.13 (85)
Williamstown	5.13 (43)
17 Sep, North Port Oval
Collingwood	9.8 (62)
Footscray	27.19 (181)

Grand final
25 Sep, Etihad Stadium
Casey	10.6 (66)
Footscray	13.19 (97)

=== Qualifying and elimination finals ===
	Qualifying finals
Saturday, 3 September (2:00 pm)	Casey 20.8 (128)	def.	Footscray 8.10 (58)	Casey Fields	Report
Saturday, 3 September (2:00 pm)	Collingwood 16.6 (102)	def.	Williamstown 7.14 (56)	Ikon Park	Report

	Elimination finals
Saturday, 3 September (2:40 pm)	Geelong 17.8 (110)	def. by	Essendon 21.6 (132)	North Port Oval	Report
Sunday, 4 September (2:40 pm)	Port Melbourne 15.10 (100)	def. by	Sandringham 22.13 (145)	North Port Oval	Report

=== Semi-finals ===
	Semi-finals
Saturday 10 September (11:40 am)	Williamstown 14.11 (95)	def.	Sandringham 7.7 (49)	North Port Oval	Report
Sunday 11 September (2:40 pm)	Footscray 13.16 (94)	def.	Essendon 10.15 (75)	North Port Oval	Report

=== Preliminary finals ===
	Preliminary finals
Saturday, 17 September (2:40pm)	Collingwood 9.8 (62)	def. by	Footscray 27.19 (181)	North Port Oval	Report
Sunday, 18 September (2:40pm)	Casey 12.13 (85)	def.	Williamstown 5.13 (43)	North Port Oval	Report
Footscray's 119-point victory was the biggest winning margin in the finals series since the VFL era began in 1996, breaking the previous record of 115 points set by Collingwood in 2009.; Casey qualified for its first grand final since 1999.

=== Grand Final ===
2016 VFL Grand Final
Sunday 25 September (3:00 pm)	Casey	def. by	Footscray	Etihad Stadium (crowd: 17,348)	Report
2.1 (13); 6.3 (39); 6.3 (39); 10.6 (66)	Q1; Q2; Q3; Final	2.7 (19); 4.9 (33); 12.13 (85); 13.19 (97)	Umpires: D. Butcher, H. Gavine, H. Ryan; Norm Goss Memorial Medal: Lin Jong (Footscray); Television broadcast: Seven Network
3: T. Smith; 2: Weideman; 1: Hulett, Newton, Scott, Trengove, White	Goals	3: Jamieson; 2: Jong, Campbell; 1: Dale, Nash, Lynch, Williams, Hannan, Tashevski-Beckwith
Oliver, T. Smith, Dunn, J. Smith, Kennedy, Newton	Best

== Awards ==
- The Frosty Miller Medal was won by Ahmed Saad (Coburg), who kicked 49 goals during the home-and-away season.
- The J. J. Liston Trophy was won by Michael Gibbons (Williamstown), who polled 17 votes. George Horlin-Smith (Geelong reserves) finished second with 15 votes, and Ben Jolley (Williamstown) and Toby Pinwill (Port Melbourne) were equal third with 14 votes.
- The Fothergill–Round Medal was won by Luke Ryan (Coburg).
- The Development League premiership was won by Box Hill. Box Hill 26.16 (172) defeated Casey 10.7 (67) in the Grand Final, played at North Port Oval on 18 September as a curtain-raiser to the seniors first preliminary final.

=== Team of the Year ===
2016 VFL Team of the Year
B:	Luke Ryan (Coburg)	Jack Hutchins (Port Melbourne)	Aaron Heppell (Essendon)
HB:	Jordan Russell (Footscray)	Tom Stewart (Geelong)	Jordan Kelly (Collingwood)
C:	Nick Rippon (North Ballarat)	Michael Gibbons (Williamstown)	Robbie Fox (Coburg)
HF:	Ben Cavarra (Frankston)	Tim Smith (Casey)	Matt Hanson (Werribee)
F:	Sam Dunell (Williamstown)	Ahmed Saad (Coburg)	Tom Atkins (Geelong)
Foll:	Nick Meese (Williamstown)	Tom O'Sullivan (Port Melbourne)	Willie Wheeler (Williamstown)
Int:	Khan Haretuku (Port Melbourne)	Ben Jolley (Williamstown)	Tom Wilson (Northern Blues)
Int:	Damian Mascitti (Port Melbourne)	Sam Darley (Richmond)	Declan Keilty (Casey)
Coach:	Dale Tapping (Collingwood)		

== Notable events ==
- In August, the Frankston Football Club, struggling with debts in excess of $1,000,000 and a downturn in the profitability of its poker machine licence, went into voluntary administration. The club's VFL licence was terminated the following month, in the week after the VFL Grand Final, resulting in the club missing the 2017 season before being readmitted in 2018 after resolving its financial issues.

== See also ==
- List of VFA/VFL premiers
- Australian rules football
- Victorian Football League
- Australian Football League
- 2016 AFL season
