= 1996 VFL season =

115th season of the Victorian Football League

- Date: 6 April – 22 September 1996
- Teams: 18
- Premiers: Springvale; 3rd premiership
- Runners-up: Frankston; 2nd runners-up result
- Minor premiers: Frankston; 1st minor premiership
- J. J. Liston Trophy: Paul Dooley (Williamstown – 19 votes)
- Leading goalkicker: Jack Aziz (Werribee – 74 goals)

The 1996 VFL season was the 115th season of the Victorian Football League (VFL), an Australian rules football competition played in the state of Victoria. The season began on 6 April and concluded on 22 September, comprising an 18-match home-and-away season over 20 rounds, followed by a four-week finals series.

Springvale won the premiership for the second consecutive season and the third time overall, defeating Frankston by three points in the 1996 VFL Grand Final.

The 1996 season was first season in which the competition was known as the "Victorian Football League", after having previously been known as the "Victorian Football Association" (VFA) – although it was the second season contested after the VFA's board of management was dissolved and administration of the competition was turned over to the Victorian State Football League (VSFL). Under the VSFL, the competition was restructured as a state league to serve as a supporting and developmental competition for the Victorian clubs in the Australian Football League (AFL), with the league beginning a new expansion into regional Victoria from this season.

== League membership ==
=== Background ===
At the end of the 1994 season, the administration of the former Victorian Football Association was merged into the Victorian State Football League – an administrative body which administered football in Victoria and served as the Australian Football League's Victorian arm. The VSFL intended to transform the VFA into a state-level football league which could serve as a developmental and minor grade system for Victoria's AFL teams, in the same manner that the South Australian National Football League and West Australian Football League supported their AFL teams' interests. Under the VSFL's vision, the state league would comprise:

- Twelve clubs: eight in Melbourne and four in regional Victoria
- Each club would field a senior and reserves team in the state league
- Each club would be affiliated with its local team from the VSFL's Under-18s competition to provide development and a pathway to senior football for players not drafted to the AFL
- Reserves players from the Victorian AFL clubs would play in the state league, rather than in a dedicated reserves competition.

In 1995, the VSFL began transitioning towards this vision by abolishing the VFA's Under-19s competition and reducing the number of clubs from twelve to nine.

=== Changes made for 1996 ===
The first announcements about the composition of the league for the 1996 season were made in August 1995, when two powerhouse teams from regional Victoria confirmed they would be joining the VFL as part of the regional expansion. These clubs were:

- Traralgon: from the Gippsland Latrobe Valley Football League, the Traralgon Maroons had been Gippsland's dominant team through the early 1990s, winning premierships in 1990, 1991, 1992 and 1994. Traralgon was to be affiliated with the Gippsland Power under-18s club.
- North Ballarat: from the Ballarat Football League, North Ballarat Roosters had been dominant over a period of two decades, having won eleven of the past eighteen premierships. North Ballarat was to be affiliated with the Ballarat Rebels under-18s club.

The VSFL indicated that it would phase in teams from its other two regional zones – Bendigo and Ovens & Murray – from 1997 or later, depending on the success of Traralgon and North Ballarat. It also confirmed that it would reduce the number of Melbourne-based teams from nine to eight, but did not at this stage nominate which club would be expelled or merged.

The remainder of the changes to be made for 1996 were announced in early October 1995. The changes were:

- The name of the competition was changed from Victorian Football Association to Victorian Football League. Despite the name change, the competition is considered continuous across both names, with the VSFL confirming that records and history from the VFA would be recognised in the VFL.
- The struggling Preston Football Club was formally merged with its Under-18 club the Northern Knights, rather than remaining as distinct clubs with an affiliation as was the case for all other pairings. Under the arrangement, the club changed its nickname from Bullants to Knights, and changed its playing guernsey to match the white, navy and black worn by the Under-18 Knights.
- The Geelong Falcons Under-18 team, which had been aligned with Werribee in 1995, was re-allocated to Port Melbourne.
- Werribee and Williamstown were ordered to merge to form a single western suburban club to be affiliated with the Western Jets Under-18 team.

=== Werribee and Williamstown ===
Werribee and Williamstown were given an ultimatum of 31 October to agree to merger terms. If they could agree to terms for a merger, they would be compensated by having their competition fees waived in the near term; if they could not agree to terms for a merger, one would face expulsion. The VSFL provided the clubs with a copy of the SANFL's Woodville-West Torrens merger agreement, widely considered at the time to be Australian rules football's most successful top level merger, as a guide. The clubs entered merger negotiations in good faith, but talks ultimately reached an impasse over the choice of home ground: neither club would accept the other's as a permanent home; and Werribee would not accept a solution in which matches were divided in the long-term between Point Gellibrand Oval and Chirnside Park, arguing that it would become an eternal cause of infighting within the merged committee if a binding decision on long-term home ground were not made at the time of the merger. The closest the clubs came to a merger agreement was a proposal to name the club the Williamstown-Werribee Football Club, compete in a blue and gold guernsey as the Western Seagulls, and split games between the two home grounds for two years before moving permanently to Chirnside Park in 1998 – but Williamstown still refused to acquiesce on the issue of home ground. During the merger talks, rallies were held at Williamstown to protest the merger, attracting high-profile supporters including former Premier of Victoria and member for Williamstown Joan Kirner; and club members made it known that they would prefer to see the club wound up than merged.

On 26 October, following the failure of merger talks, the VSFL announced that the eighth licence would be awarded to Williamstown, and that Werribee would be expelled from the VFL. The announcement was met with considerable surprise, as most had expected Williamstown to be the club expelled: Williamstown, while historically strong, was in a weak position both on-field (winless in 1995) and off-field; while Werribee, historically weak but enjoying the benefits of population growth in the outer west, was thriving in the most successful period of its existence. Werribee president Bruce Montgomery believed his club to be stronger than Williamstown, and suspected political influences had contributed to the decision; and that although Werribee was $200,000 in debt at the time, it was solvent provided it was competing in the VFL.

Werribee fought back over the following two weeks to secure re-admission to the competition, and a rally in support of the club drew 2,500 fans. It put forward a proposal to compete stand-alone, with no affiliation to any Under-18 club, and with the support of the Wyndham Council for a $500,000 upgrade of Chirnside Park, but the VSFL board voted against the proposal on 5 November. Finally, the club considered its legal options, planning to argue that the VSFL had distributed its eight metropolitan licences irresponsibly, and that the changed nature of the merged Preston Bullants–Northern Knights club meant that it might not necessarily count amongst those eight metropolitan licences; after receiving advice that Werribee's challenge could be successful, the VSFL relented and agreed to grant Werribee re-admission. The terms of the re-admission were similar to Werribee's initial proposal, and it became the only club with no affiliation with any Under-18s team, nor any structure of local feeder teams.

== Ladder ==
Pos	Team	Pld	W	L	D	PF	PA	PP	Pts	Qualification
1	Frankston	18	16	2	0	2111	1059	199.3	64	Finals series
2	Werribee	18	13	5	0	1602	1217	131.6	52	Finals series
3	Springvale (P)	18	12	6	0	1548	1124	137.7	48	Finals series
4	Williamstown	18	11	6	1	1591	1482	107.4	46	Finals series
5	Port Melbourne	18	11	6	1	1543	1453	106.2	46	Finals series
6	Sandringham	18	9	9	0	1433	1630	87.9	36	
7	Coburg	18	7	11	0	1656	1846	89.7	28	
8	North Ballarat	18	6	12	0	1246	1430	87.1	24	
9	Preston	18	6	12	0	1283	1501	85.5	24	
10	Box Hill	18	6	12	0	1355	1784	76.0	24	
11	Traralgon	18	1	17	0	1235	2077	59.5	4	

Rules for classification: 1) points; 2) percentage; 3) number of points for
(P) Premiers

== Finals ==
=== Qualifying and elimination finals ===
	Qualifying final
Saturday, 31 August (2:00 pm)	Werribee 8.7 (55)	def. by	Springvale 13.16 (94)	North Port Oval (crowd: 1,192)

	Elimination final
Sunday, 1 September (2:00 pm)	Williamstown 19.19 (133)	def.	Port Melbourne 18.13 (121)	North Port Oval (crowd: 3,771)

=== Semi-finals ===
	First semi-final
Saturday, 7 September (2:00pm)	Werribee 13.19 (97)	def.	Williamstown 9.5 (59)	North Port Oval

	Second semi-final
Sunday, 8 September (2:00pm)	Springvale 17.11 (113)	def.	Frankston 9.10 (64)	North Port Oval

=== Preliminary final ===
	Preliminary final
Saturday, 14 September (2:00pm)	Frankston 9.5 (59)	def.	Werribee 5.3 (33)	North Port Oval (crowd: 2,883)

=== Grand Final ===
1996 VFL Grand Final
Sunday, 22 September (2:00 pm)	Springvale	def.	Frankston	Optus Oval (crowd: 8,183)
3.2 (20); 7.6 (48); 10.7 (67); 11.7 (73)	Q1; Q2; Q3; Final	5.4 (34); 9.6 (60); 9.7 (61); 10.10 (70)	Umpires: A. Malcolm, M. Sexton, T. Shearer; Norm Goss Memorial Medal: Kain Taylor (Springvale)
K. Taylor 3, Baldwin 2, Evans 2, Davison, Delarue, Smith, Yeats	Goals	Damien Clarke 2, Millane 2, S. Ryan 2, Atkinson, Daniel Clarke, Mackay, Mead
Yeats (cut head)	Injuries
Yeats, for striking Moore in the first quarter	Reports
Graeme Yeats (Springvale) kicked the winning goal with 47 seconds remaining, after marking on the goal-line and kicking from a tight angle.

== Awards ==
- The leading goalkicker for the season was Jack Aziz (Werribee), who kicked 74 goals.
- The J. J. Liston Trophy was won by Paul Dooley (Williamstown), who polled 19 votes. Dooley finished ahead of Greg Cox (North Ballarat), who was second with 17 votes.
- The Fothergill–Round Medal was also won by Paul Dooley (Williamstown).
- Port Melbourne won the reserves premiership. Port Melbourne 12.8 (80) defeated Frankston 8.12 (60) in the Grand Final, held as a curtain-raiser to the Seniors Grand Final on 22 September.

== Notable events ==
- The Round 11 match between Springvale and Traralgon, originally scheduled for Sunday, 23 June at Springvale Reserve, was postponed after rain flooded the ground. The match was rescheduled to the evening of Tuesday, 6 August at the Traralgon Recreation Reserve. To help to mitigate the shorter break between matches, each quarter was played five minutes shorter than regulation and an extra interchange player was allowed.

== See also ==
- 1996 AFL season
