= 1995 VFA season =

Overview
- Date: 15 April – 24 September 1995
- Teams: 9
- Premiers: Springvale; 2nd premiership
- Runners-up: Sandringham; 5th runners-up result
- Minor premiers: Springvale; 1st minor premiership
- Pre-season cup: Springvale; 1st pre-season cup win
- J. J. Liston Trophy: Paul Satterley (Werribee – 18 votes)
- Leading goalkicker: Danny Sexton (Port Melbourne – 64 goals)

Attendance
- Matches played: 78
- Highest (finals): 6,445 (Grand Final, Springvale vs Sandringham)

The 1995 VFA season was the 114th season of the Victorian Football Association (VFA), an Australian rules football competition played in the state of Victoria.

The premiership was won by the Springvale Football Club, after it defeated Sandringham in the grand final on 24 September by 43 points; it was the second premiership won by the club.

The 1995 season was the first season contested after the Victorian Football Association's board of management was dissolved and administration of the competition was turned over to the Victorian State Football League. Under the VSFL, the competition was restructured as a state league to serve as a supporting and developmental competition for the Victorian clubs in the Australian Football League. The 1995 season is a transitional season between the old and new structures. It was the final season in which the competition was known as the Victorian Football Association, before switching its name to the Victorian Football League in 1996.

== Clubs ==
=== Venues ===
Club	Home venue(s)	Capacity
Box Hill	Box Hill City Oval	10,000
Coburg	Coburg City Oval	12,000
Frankston	Frankston Park	5,000
Port Melbourne	North Port Oval	6,000
Preston	Preston City Oval	5,000
Sandringham	Beach Road Oval	6,000
Springvale	Springvale Reserve	5,000
Werribee	Chirnside Park	8,000
Williamstown	Williamstown Cricket Ground	6,000

=== Club leadership ===
Club	Coach	Captain(s)
Box Hill	John Murphy	David Banfield
Coburg	Kevin Breen	Steven Salvador
Frankston	Graham Kendall	Des Ryan
Preston	Peter Weightman	Simon Taylor
Port Melbourne	Shane Molloy	
Sandringham	Tom Alvin	Anthony Allen
Springvale	Michael Ford	Denis Knight
Werribee	Donald McDonald	Donald McDonald
Williamstown	Damien Christensen	Damien Christensen

== Competition re-structure ==
=== Background ===
Through the late 1980s and early 1990s, the Australian Football League (which had been known as the Victorian Football League until 1990) had expanded from a Melbourne-based competition into a national competition, and by 1994 it had admitted four new clubs: West Coast, Brisbane, Adelaide; and Fremantle was announced to begin playing in 1995 – with further expansion discussed. This had created inconsistencies in the AFL's structure: the Victorian clubs (and Sydney, which had a Victorian heritage) operated with a traditional minor grades structure, each fielding reserves and under-19s teams in a dedicated competition in addition to the seniors; but the interstate clubs operated only a senior team, with their states' existing state-level competitions (the South Australian National Football League, Queensland Australian Football League and West Australian Football League) serving the function of the minor grades and junior development.

The AFL began to act on this inconsistency at the end of its 1991 season, when it abolished its traditional zone-based recruiting in favour of the AFL draft for Victorian clubs, and abolished its under-19s competition. A new administrative body, the Victorian State Football League, was established to take over the AFL's administration of football in Victoria, which included football at most levels, but did not include the Victorian Football Association, which operated independently. The VSFL operated a new under-18s competition with newly established clubs across metropolitan and regional Victoria which were independent from AFL clubs. The Victorian AFL clubs and Sydney still operated reserves teams, and VSFL operated their reserves competition. In 1993, the AFL Commission was granted the power to administer the AFL independently, replacing the former structure requiring a vote of club presidents to enact decisions.

Separate to the AFL's drivers, the Victorian Football Association and most of its clubs were in severe financial trouble by 1994. Many clubs were still struggling with debt built up from overspending during the 1970s or 1980s, and most clubs were reliant on poker machines (or older, less lucrative bingo licences) and cutting player payments to stay viable, since gate takings and sponsorships could not sustain the clubs. As a sign of the Association's struggles, the $25,000 affiliation fee was waived in 1994. The Association executive believed that the Association was heading towards folding if no changes were made.

=== State league proposal ===
One of the early urgent priorities for the AFL Commission when it gained its enhanced administrative powers was to complete the restructuring of state-level football in Victoria. In early 1994, the commission proposed the establishment of a new Victorian state league, which was to have commenced in 1995. The plan would include:

- Establishment of a new, twelve-team state league in Victoria, administered by the VSFL. Clubs would be based in both Melbourne and regional Victoria, and would operate both a senior and a reserves grade.
- The state league clubs would be aligned geographically with the clubs in the VSFL Under-18s competition.
- The Victorian AFL clubs' reserves grade would be abolished, and reserve players from the Victorian AFL clubs would instead play in the new state league.

This new structure was intended to: bring the Victorian structure in line with the interstate structures; reduce operating costs for the Victorian AFL clubs; and, stop the exodus of undrafted or delisted Victorian players to the SANFL or WAFL by providing a strong state-level senior competition for those players to play in, resulting in a stronger developmental structure in Victoria overall to protect the interests of the game in the state. The commission also considered including a club in Tasmania to provide similar developmental benefits to that state.

Although the AFL Commission did not explicitly propose that the new state league comprise the Association clubs, it was seen as a natural solution. The Association saw its own involvement in the new state league structure as its only means of survival, and had to some extent been preparing for such a change since the 1986 FORT review. Association president Tony Hannebery worked with VSFL president Ken Gannon throughout 1994 to arrange for a merger. In July, the two bodies agreed in principle to a merger under which the Association administration would be merged into the VSFL administration, and some but not all of the Association clubs would become the metropolitan teams in the state league.

As the 1994 season progressed, there was an increasingly strong opposition from the Victorian AFL clubs against the proposal to abolish their reserves competition, and it reached the point that the clubs threatened to unite and enact their power to sack the AFL Commission if it went through with the plan. Consequently, the AFL Commission acquiesced on the matter of abolition of the reserves competition; but, it still proceeded with the establishment of the new VSFL state league from 1995, to run in parallel with the AFL reserves. The AFL Commission promised to revisit the abolition of the AFL reserves, which ultimately occurred for the 2000 season.

=== Merger of the VFA and VSFL ===
In October, the Association and the VSFL agreed to terms for a merger. As a result, the Association board of management was formally dissolved, bringing an end to the Victorian Football Association's 117 years as an independent entity. The Association was given three seats on the nine-man VSFL board, and Tony Hannebery departed as the Association's final president.

To establish its on-field composition, the VSFL extended invitations for eight of the Association's twelve clubs to join under 'A' licences. These clubs would form the state league's eight Melbourne-based clubs, with each to field a senior and reserves team, and to be affiliated with one of the VSFL Under-18s competition's seven metropolitan clubs or the Geelong Falcons. The remaining Association clubs could apply for a 'B' licence, which would end their time as senior clubs, but allow them to carry on their existing identity in the Under-18s competition. The only club to voluntarily take a 'B' licence was Prahran, which withdrew from senior competition on 16 September 1994. The remaining clubs submitted bids for 'A' licences. Because of the need for the senior clubs to be viable and geographically aligned with their VSFL Under-18s teams, clubs were competing against their neighbours for access to the 'A' licences, and five clubs immediately appeared secure: Box Hill (aligned with Eastern), Frankston (Southern), Sandringham (Central), Preston (Northern) and Werribee (Geelong). This left six clubs fighting over the remaining three regions: Coburg, Port Melbourne and Williamstown (North-Western and Western); and Dandenong, Oakleigh and Springvale (South-Eastern).

In the end, the Association proposed and obtained agreement from the VSFL to admit nine Association clubs for the 1995 season instead of eight. Springvale received the 'A' licence for the south-east, and Oakleigh and Dandenong both received 'B' licences; and Coburg, Port Melbourne and Williamstown were all given 'A' licences and shared their two regions. In admitting the nine clubs, the VSFL stated that it still intended to reduce the number to eight for the 1996 season, meaning that one club was likely to face expulsion at the end of the season. The three clubs with 'B' licences each gave their name and home ground to one of the VSFL Under-18 teams: the Central Dragons moved to Toorak Park and became the Prahran Dragons; the Southern Stingrays moved to Shepley Oval and became the Dandenong Southern Stingrays; and the south-eastern team, which was new for 1995, set up at Warrawee Park and was named the Oakleigh Chargers.

Other arrangements relating to the merger were:

- It was planned to expand into regional Victoria, with four new clubs to be admitted to align with the Ballarat, Bendigo, Ovens & Murray and Gippsland VSFL Under-18 teams; but, that this expansion would not begin until 1996.
- The new state competition would carry on the Victorian Football Association name in 1995; but, that the VSFL would review this at the end of the season. Ultimately, 1995 was the final season to carry the Victorian Football Association name, and its name was changed to the Victorian Football League (the same name formerly used by the Australian Football League) from 1996 onwards.
- The Association's Under-19s competition was abolished, with the VSFL Under-18s effectively taking its place.

With the additional changes slated for the 1996 season, the 1995 season was a transitional season between the old and new structures, and cannot easily be categorised as being part of one era or the other. The competition was still officially known as the VFA, but was also referred to as the VicSafe Cup (reflecting the name of the season's major sponsor) and the representative team wore the logo that would be used for the VFL the following season.

Despite the significant off-field changes, the on-field continuity was sufficient that the new state league structure is considered a continuation of the former Association, with premierships and onfield records from each considered equivalent.

== Home-and-away season ==
In the home-and-away season, each team played sixteen games, a reduction from eighteen which had been played for many years. The top five then contested the finals under the McIntyre final five system. Finals were played at Victoria Park.

== Ladder ==
Pos	Team	Pld	W	L	D	PF	PA	PP	Pts	Qualification
1	Springvale (P)	16	15	1	0	1892	1089	173.7	60	Finals series
2	Port Melbourne	16	12	4	0	2058	1312	156.9	48	Finals series
3	Sandringham	16	10	6	0	1622	1207	134.4	40	Finals series
4	Werribee	16	9	7	0	1189	1338	88.9	36	Finals series
5	Frankston	16	8	8	0	1604	1418	113.1	32	Finals series
6	Box Hill	16	8	8	0	1288	1480	87.0	32	
7	Preston	16	5	11	0	1272	1514	84.0	20	
8	Coburg	16	5	11	0	1325	1722	76.9	20	
9	Williamstown	16	0	16	0	1086	2256	48.1	0	

Rules for classification: 1) points; 2) percentage; 3) number of points for.
(P) Premiers

== Finals ==
=== Qualifying and elimination finals ===
	Elimination final
Saturday, 2 September	Werribee 13.7 (85)	def. by	Frankston 14.13 (97)	Victoria Park (crowd: 1,533)

	Qualifying final
Sunday, 3 September	Port Melbourne 12.15 (87)	def. by	Sandringham 19.18 (132)	Victoria Park (crowd: 2,415)

=== Semi-finals ===
	First semi-final
Saturday, 9 September	Port Melbourne 23.8 (146)	def.	Frankston 14.8 (92)	Victoria Park (crowd: 2,062)

	Second semi-final
Sunday, 10 September	Springvale 19.15 (129)	def.	Sandringham 12.12 (84)	Victoria Park (crowd: 2,194)

=== Preliminary final ===
	Preliminary final
Sunday, 17 September	Sandringham 18.18 (126)	def.	Port Melbourne 8.10 (58)	Victoria Park

=== Grand Final ===
1995 VFA Grand Final
Sunday, 24 September	Springvale	def.	Sandringham	Victoria Park (crowd: 6,445)
1.1 (7); 5.5 (35); 7.5 (47); 14.10 (94)	Q1; Q2; Q3; Final	2.2 (14); 3.4 (22); 5.12 (42); 6.15 (51)	Umpires: Hanley, Sercia, Sexton; Norm Goss Memorial Medal: Martin Mellody (Springvale)
Evans 5, O'Donnell 2, Smith 2, Baldwin, Courtney, Dyson-Holland, Mellody, Peacock	Goals	Amiet 2, Foley 2, Allen, Walker
Clark, for striking Foley in the second quarter Taylor, for striking Winton in the third quarter	Reports	Winton, for striking Little in the third quarter

=== Awards ===
- The leading goalkicker for the season was Danny Sexton (Port Melbourne), who kicked 64 goals including finals.
- The J. J. Liston Trophy was won by Paul Satterley (Werribee), who polled 18 votes. Satterley finished ahead of Denis Knight (Springvale), who was second with 15 votes despite missing seven games for the year, and Tom Livingstone (Box Hill) and John McNamara (Port Melbourne), who each polled 12 votes.
- The Fothergill–Round Medal was won by Mark Porter (Coburg).
- Springvale won the reserves premiership. Springvale 10.16 (76) defeated Box Hill 6.13 (49) in the grand final, held as a curtain-raiser to the Seniors Grand Final on 24 September.
- Springvale won the pre-season competition. Springvale 9.9 (63) defeated Box Hill 8.8 (56) in the grand final, held on 8 April at Victoria Park.

== Notable events ==
=== Interleague matches ===
The Association played one interstate match, against New South Wales, during 1995. The match was played on 17 June at the Melbourne Cricket Ground as a curtain raiser to the State of Origin match between Victoria and South Australia.

	1995 Interstate matches
Saturday, 17 June	V.F.A. 16.15 (111)	def.	New South Wales 2.7 (19)	Melbourne Cricket Ground (crowd: 64,186 (C-R))

=== Other notable events ===
- With only nine teams competing, it was the competition's smallest number of teams since only eight teams contested the 1925 VFA season.
- Werribee began the season with three consecutive losses by a combined 259 points before recovering to reach the finals.
- Williamstown did not win any senior or reserves games during the season.

== See also ==
- 1995 AFL season
