= 1997 VFL season =

- Date: 5 April – 21 September 1997
- Teams: 11
- Premiers: Sandringham; 6th premiership
- Runners-up: Frankston; 3rd runners-up result
- Minor premiers: Frankston; 2nd minor premiership
- J. J. Liston Trophy: Justin Crough (Sandringham)
- Leading goalkicker: Shayne Smith (Springvale – 107 goals)

The 1997 Victorian Football League season was the 116th season of the Australian rules football competition. The premiership was won by the Sandringham Football Club, after it defeated Frankston by 29 points in the Grand Final on 21 September.

== Ladder ==
| Pos | Team | Pld | W | L | D | PF | PA | PP | Pts | |
|---|---|---|---|---|---|---|---|---|---|---|
| 1 | Frankston | 18 | 17 | 1 | 0 | 1966 | 1174 | 167.5 | 68 | Finals |
| 2 | Springvale | 18 | 14 | 4 | 0 | 2006 | 1256 | 159.7 | 56 | Finals |
| 3 | Sandringham (P) | 18 | 14 | 4 | 0 | 1677 | 1075 | 156.0 | 56 | Finals |
| 4 | Werribee | 18 | 12 | 6 | 0 | 1883 | 1366 | 137.8 | 48 | Finals |
| 5 | Port Melbourne | 18 | 10 | 8 | 0 | 1660 | 1430 | 116.1 | 40 | Finals |
| 6 | Williamstown | 18 | 8 | 8 | 2 | 1544 | 1662 | 92.9 | 36 | |
| 7 | Preston | 18 | 7 | 11 | 0 | 1360 | 1618 | 84.1 | 28 | |
| 8 | North Ballarat | 18 | 6 | 12 | 0 | 1358 | 1539 | 88.2 | 24 | |
| 9 | Box Hill | 18 | 5 | 12 | 1 | 1324 | 1521 | 87.0 | 22 | |
| 10 | Traralgon | 18 | 3 | 14 | 1 | 1199 | 2071 | 57.9 | 14 | |
| 11 | Coburg | 18 | 1 | 17 | 0 | 1084 | 2349 | 46.1 | 4 | |

Source: AustralianFootball.com
Rules for classification: 1) points; 2) percentage; 3) number of points for.
(P) Premiers

== Finals series ==
=== Qualifying and elimination finals ===
| | Qualifying final |
| Saturday, 30 August (2:00 pm) | Springvale 14.6 (90) | def. by | Sandringham 17.13 (115) | North Port Oval |

| | Elimination final |
| Sunday, 31 August (2:00 pm) | Werribee 14.16 (100) | def. by | Port Melbourne 17.14 (116) | North Port Oval |

=== Semi-finals ===
| | First semi-final |
| Sunday, 7 September (2:00pm) | Springvale 16.7 (103) | def. | Port Melbourne 13.6 (84) | North Port Oval |

| | Second semi-final |
| Saturday, 6 September (2:00pm) | Frankston 10.7 (67) | def. by | Sandringham 16.12 (108) | North Port Oval |

=== Preliminary final ===
| | Preliminary final |
| Sunday, 14 September (2:00pm) | Frankston 14.17 (101) | def. | Springvale 9.8 (62) | North Port Oval |

=== Grand Final ===
1997 VFL Grand Final
Sunday, 21 September (2:00pm) | Sandringham | def. | Frankston | North Port Oval (crowd: 10,000)
3.1 (19); 5.6 (36); 7.10 (52); 10.13 (73) | Q1; Q2; Q3; Final | 1.3 (9); 4.3 (27); 4.9 (33); 5.14 (44) | Umpires: M. Vozzo, W. Mann, M. James; Norm Goss Memorial Medal: Tim Scott-Branagan (Sandringham)
Amiet 4, Templeton 2, Scott-Branagan 2, Frater, Dear | Goals | R. Stubbs 3, S. Ryan, Cummings
Reports | Pickering, for striking Mann in the first quarter R. Stubbs, for striking Grant in the first quarter Goodwin, for striking Dear in the first quarter

== Awards ==
- The leading goalkicker for the season was Shayne Smith (Springvale), who kicked 107 goals.
- The J. J. Liston Trophy was won by Justin Crough (Sandringham).
- The Fothergill–Round Medal was won by James Puli (Werribee).
- Frankston won the reserves premiership. Frankston 13.15 (93) defeated Port Melbourne 11.7 (73) in the Grand Final, held as a curtain-raiser to the Seniors Grand Final on 21 September.

== Notable events ==
- The VFL adopted two rule changes which had been incorporated into the Australian Football League in 1994: the size of the interchange bench was increased from two to three, and the length of a quarter was reduced from 25 minutes to 20 minutes with extra provisions for time on.
