= Peter Banfield =

Australian rules footballer

Personal information
- Full name: Peter Charles Banfield
- Born: 21 January 1965 (age 61)
- Original team: North Ringwood Saints (EFL)
- Height: 177 cm (5 ft 10 in)
- Weight: 80 kg (176 lb)
- Position: Rover

Playing career^{1}
Years	Club	Games (Goals)
1984–86	Essendon (VFL)	11 (3)
1987–89	Brisbane Bears (VFL)	45 (16)
1990–93	West Adelaide (SANFL)	95 (?)
- ^{1} Playing statistics correct to the end of 1993.

Career highlights
- VFL debut with Essendon on 19 May 1984 v Geelong at Waverley Park; SANFL debut with West Adelaide on 21 April 1990; West Adelaide Best & Fairest 1991

Peter Charles Banfield (born 21 January 1965) is a former Australian rules footballer who played for Essendon and the Brisbane Bears in the Victorian Football League (VFL) during the 1980s, and with West Adelaide in the South Australian National Football League (SANFL) during the early 1990s.

== Playing career ==
Banfield was recruited from North Ringwood made his way into the Essendon team having played under-19s football at the club. He participated in the Essendon reserves 1983 premiership and after being unable to establish himself in the seniors, won a PIE Best & Fairest in 1986. When he did make it into the VFL side, 11 times in total, Essendon won all their games.

Brisbane picked up Banfield for their first ever VFL season in 1987 and he took part in their inaugural appearance in Round 1 starting in the back pocket. He only missed two games that year collecting a career-best 197 kicks, 93 handballs and kicking 9 goals. After three seasons in Brisbane where he played a total of 45 games, Banfield played league football in his third state, South Australia, by joining West Adelaide.

Banfield played 95 games with the club over four years and won their Best & Fairest award in 1991. In 1991 Banfield's form was a contributing factor in West's late-season form change which saw them win 9 of their last 11 minor round games to surge into the finals. This form continued into the finals but was halted in the Grand Final against North Adelaide. Banfield continued to play for West Adelaide under the coaching of Neil Kerley in 1992 and 1993, but his team failed to recapture their late 1991 form and missed the finals in both years, finishing 6th and 8th respectively.

Following the 1993 SANFL season, Peter Banfield retired from league football having played a total of 56 VFL games for Essendon and Brisbane from 1984 to 1989 and 95 SANFL games for West Adelaide from 1990 to 1993.

== Coaching career ==
As a coach, Banfield steered ACT club Ainslie to three successive premierships from 1994 to 1996. This earned him the job of St Kilda's assistant coach, firstly to Stan Alves and then to Tim Watson. He crossed to Melbourne in 2001 for a two-year stint as Neale Daniher's assistant. The 2003 and 2004 season were spent as coach of the Bendigo Bombers and he then was put in charge of the Casey Scorpions before resigning in 2007. In 2008 Banfield took up the role as Head Coach at Old Scotch Football Club in the VAFA until 2011. In 2012, Peter Banfeild was announced as the Senior Coach of Blackburn Football Club, Blackburn finish 2nd in 2011 looking very promising in season 2012 until it became public that they had lost 38 players from their list making survival in Division 1 key for Banfeild in 2012. 2013 Banfeild took them the finals in which they bowed out in an Elimination final at the hands of Balwyn FC. Banfield continued coaching Blackburn until the end of 2015. Banfeild then was Senior Coach at the North Ringwood Football Club, The club where he played his junior football. He currently is The Seniors Men's Coach of Mazenod Old Collegians Football Club For Season 2021/2022.
