= Andrew Shipp =

Australian rules footballer (born 1979)

Personal information
- Born: 10 July 1979 (age 47)
- Original team: Springvale (VFL)
- Debut: Round 5, 1999, Fremantle vs. Brisbane, at Subiaco

Playing career^{1}
Years	Club	Games (Goals)
1999–2002	Fremantle	35 (19)
- ^{1} Playing statistics correct to the end of 2002.

Career highlights
- AFL Rising Star nominee 1999; Fothergill–Round–Mitchell Medal: 1998

Andrew Shipp (born 10 July 1979) is an Australian rules footballer who played for Fremantle in the Australian Football League (AFL) between 1999 and 2002. He was drafted from Springvale in the Victorian Football League (VFL) as the 64th selection in the 1998 AFL draft and played mainly as a forward.

In 2002 Shipp finished equal sixth in the Sandover Medal playing for Perth in the West Australian Football League (WAFL), and played 36 matches for Fremantle in the AFL. He was delisted by Fremantle and returned to Victoria in 2003 to play for Frankston Football Club in the Victorian Football League. Since 2004 he has played for the Gembrook Cockatoo Football Club in the Yarra Ranges Football & Netball League.
