= Mitch White (footballer, born 1996) =

Australian rules footballer (born 1996)

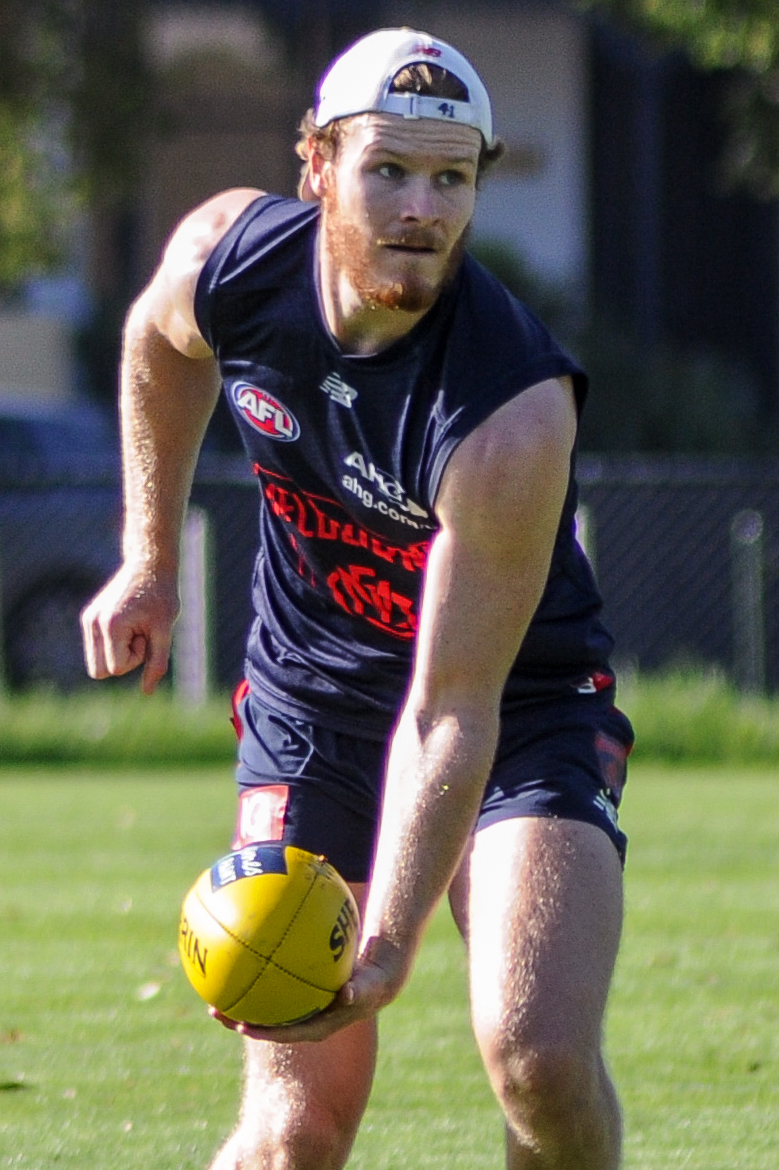
- White in March 2017

Personal information
- Born: 10 April 1996 (age 30)
- Original team: Dandenong Stingrays (TAC Cup)
- Draft: No. 20, 2015 rookie draft
- Debut: Round 23, 2015, Melbourne vs. Greater Western Sydney, at Etihad Stadium
- Height: 188 cm (6 ft 2 in)
- Weight: 88 kg (194 lb)
- Position: Defender

Playing career^{1}
Years	Club	Games (Goals)
2015–2017	Melbourne	4 (0)
- ^{1} Playing statistics correct to the end of 2017.

Career highlights
- VFL premiership captain: 2022; Norm Goss Medal: 2022

Mitchell White (born 10 April 1996) is a former professional Australian rules footballer who played for the Melbourne Football Club in the Australian Football League (AFL). A defender, 1.88 metres (6 ft 2 in) tall and weighing 88 kilograms (194 lb), White plays primarily as a half-back flanker. He entered top-level football early when he played as a bottom-aged player for the Dandenong Stingrays in the TAC Cup in 2013, the next season saw him win the club best and fairest. He was recruited by the Melbourne Football Club with the twentieth selection in the 2015 rookie draft and he made his AFL debut during the 2015 season. He played four matches in the AFL before he was delisted at the conclusion of the 2017 season.

== Early life ==
White was raised in Carrum Downs, Victoria and played his junior football with the Seaford Football Club. He played for the Dandenong Stingrays in the TAC Cup as a bottom-aged player in 2013, playing six matches. He was selected again to play for Dandenong in 2014, playing sixteen matches and was awarded the club best and fairest.

== AFL career ==
White was recruited by the Melbourne Football Club with their second selection and twentieth overall in the 2015 rookie draft. He made his Victorian Football League (VFL) debut for Melbourne's affiliate team, the Casey Scorpions, in round three and spent the majority of 2015 playing for Casey. He made his AFL debut in the twenty-six point win against Greater Western Sydney at Etihad Stadium in the final round of the season, in which he recorded sixteen disposals and six marks.

The 2016 season saw White play predominately in the VFL before he was upgraded to the senior list in July. He played his first AFL match of the year in the thirty-two point win against Fremantle at TIO Stadium in round sixteen, in which he recorded twenty disposals and received praise from then-Melbourne coach, Paul Roos. He retained his spot the next week in the thirty-six point loss against St Kilda at Etihad Stadium, before being omitted for the round eighteen match against West Coast at Domain Stadium. He returned to the VFL and helped Casey claim the minor premiership and reach their first grand final since 1999, in which the club ultimately lost to Footscray by thirty-one points.

An ankle injury forced White to miss the entire 2017 JLT Community Series and VFL practice matches, before playing his first match of the year in the round two VFL match against North Ballarat. After "terrific VFL form" according to senior coach, Simon Goodwin, he played in his first AFL match for the season in the round fifteen match against Sydney at the Melbourne Cricket Ground. It was ultimately his only AFL match for the season and after four matches in three seasons with Melbourne, he was delisted in September. He subsequently signed with the Casey for the 2018 VFL season.

== Statistics ==
Statistics are correct to the end of the 2017 season

Legend
G	Goals	K	Kicks	D	Disposals	T	Tackles
B	Behinds	H	Handballs	M	Marks

Season	Team	No.	Games	Totals							Averages (per game)						
Season	Team	No.	Games	G	B	K	H	D	M	T	G	B	K	H	D	M	T
2015	Melbourne	41	1	0	0	9	7	16	6	1	0.0	0.0	9.0	7.0	16.0	6.0	1.0
2016	Melbourne	41	2	0	0	9	19	28	7	6	0.0	0.0	4.5	9.5	14.0	3.5	3.0
2017	Melbourne	41	1	0	0	5	6	11	4	1	0.0	0.0	5.0	6.0	11.0	4.0	1.0
Career			4	0	0	23	32	55	17	8	0.0	0.0	5.8	8.0	13.8	4.3	2.0
