= Casey Demons =

Australian rules football club

Names
- Full name: Casey Football Club
- Former name(s): Springvale Football Club (1903–2005); Scorpions Football Club (2005); Casey Scorpions (2006–2016)
- Nickname(s): Demons, Dees
- Former nickname(s): Scorpions, Vales

2025 season
- After finals: VFL: 6th VFLW: DNQ
- Home-and-away season: VFL: 5th of 21; VFLW: 12th of 12

Club details
- Founded: 1903; 123 years ago
- Colours: Red Navy blue
- Competition: VFL: Men's; VFLW: Women's
- President: David Dillon
- Premierships: VFA/VFL (6): 1987; 1995; 1996; 1998; 1999; 2022
- Ground: Casey Fields (capacity: 10,000)

Uniforms
Home	Away	Alternate

Other information
- Official website: melbournefc/casey

The Casey Football Club, nicknamed the Demons, is an Australian rules football club based in the Melbourne suburb of Cranbourne East.

The club, which was previously known as the Springvale Football Club (1903–2005) and the Casey Scorpions (2006–16), plays in the Victorian Football League (VFL). It has a reserves affiliation with the Melbourne Football Club.

The club changed its nickname to the "Demons" prior to the 2017 season to strengthen its alliance with the Melbourne Football Club, also known as the "Demons".

== History ==
Casey was founded in 1903 as the Spring Vale Football Club (later spelt Springvale), and from 1915 it played at what became its traditional home ground, the Springvale Reserve at Newcomen Road. After initially playing in the Mulgrave Football Association, the club joined the Berwick District Football Association (BDFA) in 1911, and won the premiership. The club played in the BDFA until the Second World War; in its time in the BDFA, the club won seven premierships. After the war, the club switched to the more metropolitan-based Caulfield Oakleigh District League. After winning the 1956 premiership, the club switched to the Federal Football League, the top suburban league in the southern suburbs of Melbourne. The club became a powerhouse of the Federal League, and in its 25 years in the league from 1957 to 1981, it won seven premierships, including four in a row from 1960 to 1963, and missed the finals only twice. Overall, the club won fifteen senior premierships at suburban level.

Due to Springvale's strength as a club, it was seen as a strong contender to join the Victorian Football Association, the second-highest level of senior football in Melbourne. The club was offered entry to the VFA in 1961, after its first Federal League premiership, but the club turned down the offer, seeking to consolidate its strength in the Federal League, and worried that the proximity of Oakleigh and Dandenong could stifle its competitiveness. The club applied for VFA membership in 1978, but the VFA was not looking to expand at that time. Finally, as part of the VFA's expansion and restructure in 1982, Springvale was admitted to Division 2. Springvale won the Division 2 premiership in its second year in 1983, and was promoted to Division 1 in 1984, and narrowly avoided relegation for the next three years.

In December 1986, Springvale was earmarked for exclusion under the Association's controversial Football Organisation Review Team (FORT) recommendations, which sought to rationalise the Association to a stronger twelve-club competition in a single division, but which were never formally enacted after being rejected by the clubs. Less than a year later, after recruiting Phil Maylin and three other former League players in the pre-season, Springvale proved the FORT wrong by rising to the finals for the first time and winning the 1987 Division 1 premiership. Springvale was one of only two of the FORT review's excluded clubs to survive in the VFA beyond 1991, the other being Werribee. Springvale dominated the VFA/VFL in the late 1990s, winning four premierships in five years: 1995, 1996, 1998 and 1999.

When the VFA/VFL was aligned with the TAC Cup, Springvale was initially aligned with the nearby Oakleigh Chargers, with that affiliation lasting from 1995 until 1998. Since 1999, Springvale has been affiliated with the Gippsland Power.

Casey Scorpions logo from 2006 to 2016

By 2000, the club was hindered by its home ground. Aside from the rundown condition of the facilities, the surrounding area of Springvale had developed a bad reputation as a drugs hotspot, which was keeping people away. The club continued to train and play some of its games at Springvale Reserve, but played most home games nomadically at a variety of south-eastern suburban grounds for the next few years, initially at Waverley Park in 2000, and then in 2001 and 2002 at venues including Moorabbin Oval and Shepley Oval. It returned almost full-time to Newcomen Road from 2003 until 2005. During this period, the club was sometimes referred to simply as "the Scorpions".

In 2005, to attempt to financially secure its long-term future, the club came to an arrangement with the City of Casey, which had developed the new Casey Fields multi-sports complex in Cranbourne East and was seeking a VFL team to play there. The club moved its training and playing base to Casey Fields in 2006, and changed its name to the Casey Scorpions Football Club. This also brought the club geographically closer to its Gippsland Power affiliate.

When the VFL and the AFL Reserves merged in 2000, Springvale carried on as a stand-alone club for one season before entering reserves affiliations with Australian Football League clubs. From 2001 until 2008, the club was affiliated with the St Kilda Football Club. Since 2009, it has been affiliated with the Melbourne Football Club, which also maintains a training base at Casey Fields. In December 2016, the club was renamed the Casey Demons Football Club to strengthen the alliance with Melbourne, which is also nicknamed the Demons. The club adopted Melbourne's traditional guernsey design from 2017, retaining the navy blue and red colours common to both teams.

Casey also has a netball team which has competed in the Victorian Netball League (VNL) since 2019.

== Honours ==
=== Club ===
Premierships
Competition	Level	Wins	Years won
VFA/VFL Seniors	Seniors (Division 1)	6	1987, 1995, 1996, 1998, 1999, 2022
VFA/VFL Seniors	Seniors (Division 2)	1	1983
VFA/VFL Reserves	Division 1	3	1988, 1995, 2017
VFA/VFL Reserves	Division 2	1	1982
VFA/VFL Thirds	Division 1	1	1985
Finishing positions
Victorian Football League (Division 1)	Minor premiership	5	1995, 1999, 2012, 2016, 2022
Victorian Football League (Division 1)	Grand Finalists	3	1990, 2016, 2018
Victorian Football League (Division 1)	Wooden spoons	1	2004
VFL Women's	Wooden spoons	1	2026

=== Individual ===
- JJ Liston Medallists: Stuart Nicol 1990, D. Robbins 2000.
- Norm Goss Medallists: D. Vernon 1987, M. Mellody 1995, K. Taylor 1996, B Delaure 1998, D. Donati 1999, M. White 2022.
- Games Record Holder: Damian Carroll 233.
- Goals Record Holder: Shayne Smith 470
- Longest Winning Sequence: 17 (2022)
- Longest Losing Sequence: 10 (2005)

== Seasons ==
Premiers	Grand Finalist	Minor premiers	Finals appearance	Wooden spoon	VFA/VFL leading goalkicker	VFA/VFL best and fairest

Year	League	Finish	W	L	D	Coach	Captain	Best and fairest	Leading goalkicker	Goals	Ref
1982	VFA D2					Phillip Pinnell	Phillip Pinnell		Ted Carroll	118	
1983	VFA D2					Laurie Fowler	Laurie Fowler				
1984	VFA D1					Laurie Fowler	Laurie Fowler				
1985	VFA D1					Laurie Fowler	Geoff Anderson				
1986	VFA D1					Phil Fryer	Daryl Vernon				
1987	VFA D1					Phil Maylin	Phil Maylin				
1988	VFA D1					Phil Maylin	Phil Maylin				
1989	VFA					Phil Maylin	Phil Maylin				
1990	VFA					Phil Maylin	Craig Meade	Stuart Nicol			
1991	VFA					Phil Maylin	Graham Dempster				
1992	VFA					Bernie Sheehy	Rod Morgan				
1993	VFA					Bernie Sheehy	Rod Morgan				
1994	VFA					Bernie Sheehy	Denis Knight				
1995	VFA					Michael Ford	Denis Knight				
1996	VFL					Brad Gotch	Kain Taylor				
1997	VFL					Brad Gotch	Kain Taylor		Shayne Smith	107	
1998	VFL					Peter Nicholson	Kain Taylor		Shayne Smith	78	
1999	VFL					Peter Nicholson	Kain Taylor				
2000	VFL					Peter Nicholson	Jason Caples	David Robbins			
2001	VFL					Peter Nicholson	Jason Caples				
2002	VFL					Ken Sheldon	Jason Caples				
2003	VFL					Gerard FitzGerald	Steven Harrison				
2004	VFL					Graham Wright	Steven Harrison				
2005	VFL					Peter Banfield	Steven Harrison				
2006	VFL					Peter Banfield	Steven Harrison				
2007	VFL					Peter Banfield	Nigel Carmody				
2008	VFL					Greg Hutchison	Kyle Matthews				
2009	VFL					Peter German	Kyle Matthews				
2010	VFL					Brad Gotch	Kyle Matthews				
2011	VFL					Brad Gotch	Kyle Matthews; James Wall				
2012	VFL					Brett Lovett	Evan Panozza				
2013	VFL					Rohan Welsh	Evan Panozza				
2014	VFL					Rohan Welsh	Evan Panozza				
2015	VFL					Justin Plapp	Evan Panozza				
2016	VFL					Justin Plapp	Jack Hutchins				
2017	VFL					Justin Plapp	Jack Hutchins				
2018	VFL					Jade Rawlings	Jack Hutchins				
2019	VFL					Jade Rawlings; Sam Radford	Mitch White	Jimmy Munro			
2020	VFL	(No season)				Sam Radford	Mitch White	(No season)			
2021	VFL					Mark Corrigan	Mitch White	Jimmy Munro	Sam Weideman	21	
2022	VFL					Mark Corrigan	Mitch White	Jimmy Munro	Mitch Brown	38	
2023	VFL					Taylor Whitford	Mitch White	Deakyn Smith	Josh Schache	29	
2024	VFL					Taylor Whitford	Mitch White	Mitch White	Matthew Jefferson	29	
2025	VFL					Taylor Whitford	Deakyn Smith	Riley Bonner	Mitch Hardie	29	

=== Grand finals ===
- 1983 – Springvale 17 9 (111) d. Brunswick 13 16 (94) at Toorak Park
- 1987 – Springvale 14.16 (100) d. Port Melbourne 7.20 (62) at Junction Oval
- 1995 – Springvale 14.10 (94) d. Sandringham 6.15 (51) at Victoria Park
- 1996 – Springvale 11.7 (73) d. Frankston 10.10 (70) at Princes Park
- 1998 – Springvale 11.17 (83) d. Werribee 5.15 (45) at TEAC Oval
- 1999 – Springvale 19.11 (125) d. Nth Ballarat 9.11 (65) at TEAC Oval
- 2022 – Casey Demons 10.10 (70) d. Southport 5.8 (38) at Ikon Park

== Club song ==
The club song was formerly sung to the tune of "The Battle Hymn of the Republic”, but it changed to "it's a grand old flag" when the club changed its nickname to "Demons" after the affiliation with Melbourne began.
