= Australian Football League reserves affiliations =

Affiliations of Australian rules football teams

The Australian Football League (AFL) stages the highest-level senior Australian rules football competition in the country. However, there has not been a league-wide reserves competition since 1987, when the then-Victorian Football League expanded interstate to become the modern Australian Football League, with the AFL reserves competition being shut down at the end of the 1999 season.

Since that time, AFL-listed players who have not been selected in their senior teams are made eligible to play in one of three state leagues: the Victorian Football League (VFL), the South Australian National Football League (SANFL) and the West Australian Football League (WAFL). The system used to accommodate AFL-listed players within these leagues varies considerably from state to state. A fourth state league, the North East Australian Football League (NEAFL), was disbanded in 2020.

Clubs that compete in the VFL, SANFL and WAFL (and formerly the NEAFL) without an AFL reserves affiliation are often called standalone clubs. The term is also sometimes used to describe AFL clubs that field their own reserves teams.

== Current affiliations ==
For the upcoming 2026 season, the eighteen Australian Football League clubs will have the following Reserves arrangements.

Australian Football League club	Affiliated/Reserves arrangement	Affiliated/Reserves club	Affiliated Football League
Adelaide Crows	Stand-alone reserves team	Adelaide Crows	SANFL
Brisbane Lions	Stand-alone reserves team	Brisbane Lions	VFL
Carlton Blues	Stand-alone reserves team	Carlton Blues	VFL
Collingwood Magpies	Stand-alone reserves team	Collingwood Magpies	VFL
Essendon Bombers	Stand-alone reserves team	Essendon Bombers	VFL
Fremantle Dockers	Club affiliation	Peel Thunder	WAFL
Geelong Cats	Stand-alone reserves team	Geelong Cats	VFL
Gold Coast Suns	Stand-alone reserves team	Gold Coast Suns	VFL
Greater Western Sydney Giants	Stand-alone reserves team	Greater Western Sydney Giants	VFL
Hawthorn Hawks	Club affiliation	Box Hill Hawks	VFL
Melbourne Demons	Club affiliation	Casey Demons	VFL
North Melbourne Kangaroos	Stand-alone reserves team	North Melbourne Kangaroos	VFL
Port Adelaide Power	Stand-alone reserves team	Port Adelaide Magpies	SANFL
Richmond Tigers	Stand-alone reserves team	Richmond Tigers	VFL
St Kilda Saints	Stand-alone reserves team	St Kilda Saints	VFL
Sydney Swans	Stand-alone reserves team	Sydney Swans	VFL
West Coast Eagles	Stand-alone reserves team	West Coast Eagles	WAFL
Western Bulldogs	Stand-alone reserves team	Footscray Bulldogs	VFL

== Victorian clubs ==
=== Dedicated reserves competition (1919–1999) ===
From 1897 to 1981, the Victorian Football League was based solely in the state of Victoria. From 1919 to 1945, it operated two grades of competition (the seniors and Reserves), and from 1946 to 1981, three grades of competition (the seniors, Reserves, and Under-19s).

Local players were primarily recruited via the league's metropolitan and country zoning rules, and the clubs had full ability to develop its players through its Under-19s and Reserves teams: the same basic structure was also used consistently in the other two elite leagues, the SANFL and the WAFL.

Three major factors between 1986 and 1991 led to the end of this traditional arrangement in Victoria:

- Firstly, the Victorian Football League expanded interstate and became the Australian Football League.
- Secondly, VFL/AFL proposals for West Coast and Adelaide to participate in the minor grades were rejected by the WAFL and SANFL, while Brisbane (a Queensland-based club) fielded a Reserves team in 1989 to 1992 but did not field an Under-19s team.
- Thirdly, the inaugural national AFL draft was held in 1986, and the Draft gradually replaced zoning as the primary means of recruitment to the national league; with this, the raison d'etre for the developmental continuity between the Under-19, Reserves and senior grades ceased to exist.

As a result of these issues, the AFL agreed to relinquish direct control of the Victorian Reserves competition to the newly formed Victorian State Football League at the end of the 1991 season - this also saw the AFL cease to be the governing body for football in Victoria after 95 years - with the Under-19s competition and the twelve participating AFL clubs' Under-19s teams being shut down, to be replaced by the TAC Cup which featured six unaffiliated district-based Under-18s clubs.

The change to the Reserves competition was mostly administrative: while it became known as (and was governed by) the VSFL, it was otherwise identical to the 1919-1991 VFL/AFL Reserves, and is considered a direct continuation.

The VFL/AFL Reserves in 1919-1924 were contested by affiliated junior teams, a situation somewhat similar to modern club affiliations, while the VFL/AFL Reserves in 1925-1988 and the VSFL in 1993-1996 were contested by the traditional VFL clubs. At the end of 1996, Fitzroy's AFL playing operations were taken over by the Brisbane Bears, thus reducing the VSFL competition to eleven teams from 1997 until it was shut down at the end of the 1999 season.

While the Sydney Swans continued to participate after the club's relocation from South Melbourne at the end of the 1981 season, and Brisbane participated in 1989-1992, none of the South Australian or Western Australian clubs ever competed.

=== Amalgamation with the VFL (since 2000) ===
Following the 1999 season, the VSFL was merged into Victoria's second-tier senior football league, the Victorian Football League, which had been known as the Victorian Football Association until 1995 (with a history dating back to 1877). Such a merger had first been proposed as early as 1980, and a formal attempt to enact the merger for the 1995 season was defeated after strong opposition from the clubs.

Since the merger, the VFL has served as a hybrid second-tier senior competition, and since 2021, a Reserves competition for 11 of the AFL clubs. While the VFL previously had its own Reserves competition, the VFL Development League, none of the eight Victorian AFL clubs who fielded a stand-alone team in the VFL seniors was ever involved in this League before it was shut down at the end of the 2018 season.

Since the merger, there have been four types of club participating in the VFL:

- VFL/AFL club affiliations: in these cases, an AFL club enters into an agreement with a single VFL club (or, in some former cases, two VFL clubs). Any players listed at the AFL club are permitted to play with the VFL club on weekends when not selected for an AFL game. The VFL club maintains its own, separate playing list, and its weekly team is composed of a mixture of VFL-listed and AFL-listed players. The exact nature of the organisational relationship between the VFL and AFL club varies on a case-by-case basis, with some VFL sides enjoying reasonable autonomy, and others being heavily influenced by their AFL-affiliates.
- Stand-alone AFL reserves teams: in these cases, the AFL club fields its own team in the VFL. Naturally, the AFL club has complete autonomy over the operation of its VFL team, but because the AFL list of 42 is not sufficient to field two complete teams, the club is required to maintain a separate list of "top-up players" who are eligible only for VFL games. The licence fee for any AFL club fielding a stand-alone reserves team is also much higher than the cost of entering into an affiliation.
- Stand-alone VFL senior clubs: in these cases, the VFL club has no affiliation with any AFL club. It takes complete responsibility for maintaining its own list of players from outside the AFL.
- Players spread across all stand-alone VFL clubs: this option, which is similar to arrangements previously made in South Australia and Western Australia, was established from 2021 as an option for AFL clubs seeking cost savings in the wake of the COVID-19 pandemic.

Currently, there are no limitations on how many AFL-listed players may play in a VFL team on any given weekend, except during finals, when only players who have played a certain number of VFL games during the season are eligible.

There was previously a rule known as the 12–10 Rule: this stated that in a match between an affiliated VFL team and a stand-alone VFL senior team, the affiliated team could play a maximum of twelve AFL-listed players with ten VFL-listed players: in the event the AFL club had more than twelve non-selected players available, the remaining players would play in the VFL Reserves. This rule was abolished in 2011 after more AFL clubs decided to field stand-alone Reserves teams in the VFL.

=== Historical VFL/AFL affiliations by AFL club ===
For all clubs in this list, the club fielded a Reserves team in the VFL/AFL Reserves up to 1991, and then in the VSFL from 1992-1999. The Fitzroy Football Club also fielded a reserves team in these competitions, until the club's playing operations were taken over by the Brisbane Bears at the end of 1996.

This list shows all Reserves affiliations and arrangements since 2000:

Carlton

- 2000–2002 and 2021-present – fielded a stand-alone reserves team in the VFL
- 2003–2019 – affiliated with the Northern Bullants/Blues

The Northern Bullants changed its nickname to Blues in the 2012 season

Collingwood

- 2000 and 2008-present – fielded a stand-alone reserves team in the VFL
- 2001–2007 – affiliated with the Williamstown Football Club

Essendon

- 2000–2002 and 2013–present fielded a stand-alone reserves team in the VFL
- 2003–2012 – affiliated with the Bendigo Football Club

Bendigo changed its name from Diggers to Bombers when the affiliation began in 2003, with the club changing its name the Bendigo Gold in 2012. Bendigo dropped out of the VFL and folded at the end of 2014

Geelong

- 2000–present – fielded a stand-alone reserves team in the VFL

Hawthorn

- 2000–present – affiliated with the Box Hill Football Club

Box Hill changed its nickname from Mustangs to Hawks when the affiliation was established

Melbourne

- 2000–2008 – affiliated with the Sandringham Football Club
- 2009–present – affiliated with the Casey Demons

The Casey Scorpions changed its nickname to Demons in 2017

North Melbourne

- 2000–2002 – affiliated with the Murray Kangaroos Football Club, a new team established in joint-venture between the Kangaroos and the Ovens & Murray Football League; Murray Kangaroos dropped out and folded at the end of 2002
- 2003–2005 – affiliated with the Port Melbourne Football Club
- 2006–2007 – split-affiliation with the North Ballarat Football Club and the Tasmanian Devils Football Club

Tasmania went into recess at the end of 2008

- 2008–2015 – split-affiliation with the North Ballarat Football Club and the Werribee Football Club

North Ballarat went into recess at the end of 2015

- 2016-2017 – full affiliation with the Werribee Football Club
- 2018–present – fielded a stand-alone reserves team in the VFL

Richmond

- 2000 and 2014–present – fielded a stand-alone reserves team in the VFL
- 2001–2013 – affiliated with the Coburg Football Club

Coburg changed its nickname from Lions to Tigers when the affiliation was established

St Kilda

- 2000 – fielded a stand-alone reserves team in the VFL
- 2001–2008 – affiliated with the Springvale and Casey football clubs (Springvale relocated to Casey and became the Casey Scorpions in 2006)
- 2009–2025 – affiliated with the Sandringham Football Club
- 2026–present – will field a stand-alone reserves team from 2026 onwards

Western Bulldogs

- 2000 – split-affiliation with the Werribee Football Club and the Williamstown Football Club
- 2001–2007 – affiliated with the Werribee Football Club
- 2008–2013 – affiliated with the Williamstown Football Club
- 2014–present – fielded a stand-alone reserves team, known as the Footscray Bulldogs, in the VFL

== South Australian clubs ==
=== Historical arrangement ===
After Adelaide and Port Adelaide entered the AFL in 1991 and 1997 respectively, South Australia had two AFL teams and a strong nine-team state league (the SANFL). Until 2013, the AFL clubs were affiliated with the entire SANFL, rather than with an individual club as is seen in Victoria; this meant that the reserves players from each AFL club would be dispersed throughout the SANFL, playing for different teams. This arrangement was governed by the annual "AFL–SANFL Interchange Agreement".

The method used to allocate players to the state league teams varied depending upon whether the player was from South Australia, or was from interstate:

- Players from South Australia remained allocated to the SANFL clubs from which they were recruited: these players would originally have been allocated to their state league clubs as juniors under zoning rules.
- Players from interstate were allocated to the SANFL clubs based on a "mini-draft": Each year, the pool of players available in the mini-draft consisted solely of AFL-listed players in their first pre-season with a South Australian club (including both of the AFL clubs), with the SANFL teams drafting players in reverse-finishing order from the previous season.

Regardless of which method was used to allocate the player, he typically remained allocated to the same SANFL for his entire career, although there were provisions in the rules for players to be re-allocated to a different club on a case-by-case basis to ensure that the AFL-listed players were given the appropriate opportunities to develop; e.g. an AFL club could seek a re-allocation for a developing key forward on its list if the player's opportunities were limited by the presence of an established key forward in his allocated team.

This arrangement, or a variation of it, was the mechanism for distribution of Reserves players in South Australia until 2013.

=== Current arrangement ===
In August 2013, the SANFL clubs agreed to allow Adelaide to enter a stand-alone reserves team into the SANFL senior competition as a tenth team.

Among the arrangements, Adelaide's reserves team were required to pay an annual $400,000 licence fee (which adjusts for inflation) and is dispersed amongst the remaining clubs, play most of its games as the away team, and does not wear the Adelaide Crows AFL guernsey. The team consists of Adelaide Crows players who are not selected for the AFL team, one permanently contracted former Crows player to serve in a leadership position, and young top-up players from other SANFL clubs or suburban competitions. The arrangement is in place for fifteen years.

The SANFL also agreed to permit Port Adelaide to use the Port Adelaide Magpies as a stand-alone reserves team. After Port Adelaide entered the AFL in 1997, the SANFL had established the Port Adelaide Magpies as a separate legal entity from the Port Adelaide club which participated in the AFL, with the clubs being reunified via an official merger in 2010, and since 2014 it has been Port Adelaide's reserves team. It is subject to the same playing conditions as Adelaide's reserves team, except for the fact it wears the traditional Port Adelaide Magpies guernsey and plays home games at Alberton Oval.

In 2015, Port Adelaide fielded an academy team of father-son selections and international and interstate scholarship holders in the SANFL Reserves competition, as well as shutting down its traditional junior grade teams and surrendering its SANFL recruiting zones.

At the end of the 2018 season, the club withdrew from the SANFL Reserves, while Port Adelaide and the SANFL mutually agreed to shut down the academy team.

=== Historical arrangements by club ===
Adelaide

- 1991–2013 – affiliated with the entire SANFL under the interchange agreement
- 2014–present – fielded a stand-alone reserves team in the SANFL

Port Adelaide

- 1997–2013 – affiliated with the entire SANFL under the interchange agreement
- 2014–present – fielded a stand-alone reserves team in the SANFL

== Western Australian clubs ==
=== Historical arrangement ===
Like South Australia, Western Australia has two AFL clubs (Fremantle and West Coast) and a strong ten-team state league (the West Australian Football League). Initially, the Western Australian AFL clubs were involved in a league affiliation with the WAFL, which functioned in the same way as the SANFL's league affiliation. From 1999 until 2001, both clubs established affiliations with a single WAFL club, similar to (and, in fact, pre-dating by one year) those seen in Victoria, and known locally as "host-club arrangements". After the three years, the WAFL clubs voted to end these arrangements, and returned to a league affiliation for the next twelve years with players playing with their junior WAFL clubs or host clubs for those who came from other states.

=== Current arrangement ===
Starting in 2011, the two AFL clubs started to push hard to end the league affiliation model; their preference was to field stand-alone reserves teams in the WAFL, but this was rejected by the WAFL clubs. In October 2012, after two years of negotiations, the clubs agreed to return to host-club arrangements – West Coast with East Perth and Fremantle with Peel Thunder – to commence from the 2014 season, with some transitional arrangements beginning in 2013. The original deal lasted for a minimum of five seasons.

After the five years of its agreement, West Coast and East Perth mutually agreed to dissolve their agreement, and West Coast were granted approval to field a stand-alone reserves team, which commenced playing the 2019 season.

=== Historical arrangements by club ===
Fremantle

- 1995–1998 – established and affiliated with the entire WAFL
- 1999 – affiliated in a host-club arrangement with the South Fremantle Football Club
- 2000–2013 – after the WAFL clubs voted to end host-club arrangements, returned to an affiliation with the entire WAFL.
- 2014–present – affiliated in a host-club arrangement with the Peel Thunder Football Club, with an agreement in place until at least 2029.

West Coast

- 1987–1998: established and affiliated with the entire WAFL
- 1999: affiliated in a host-club arrangement with the Claremont Football Club
- 2000–2001: affiliated in a host-club arrangement with the East Perth Football Club
- 2002–2013: after the WAFL clubs voted to end host-club arrangements, returned to an affiliation with the entire WAFL.
- 2014–2018: affiliated in a host-club arrangement with the East Perth Football Club.
- 2019-present: fielded a stand-alone reserves team in the WAFL

== New South Wales and Queensland clubs ==
In New South Wales and Queensland, all four AFL clubs field stand-alone reserves teams in the Victorian Football League.

=== Historical New South Wales and Queensland affiliations ===
Brisbane Bears

- 1987–1988 – affiliated with the entire QAFL
- 1989–1992 – fielded a reserves team in the VFL reserves/AFL reserves/VSFL competition
- 1993–1996 – returned to an affiliation with the entire QAFL

Brisbane Lions

- 1997 – affiliated with the entire QAFL
- 1998–2010 – fielded a stand-alone reserves team in the QAFL: the reserves team was initially known as the Lion Cubs, became known as the Suncoast Lions from 2004.
- 2011–2019 – fielded a stand-alone reserves team in the NEAFL (in the Northern Conference while it existed). The team was known as the Brisbane Lions.
- From 2021 – field a stand-alone reserves team in the VFL.

Gold Coast

- 2011–2019 – fielded a stand-alone reserves team in the NEAFL (in the Northern Conference while it existed).
- From 2021 – field a stand-alone reserves team in the VFL.

Greater Western Sydney

- 2012–2019 – fielded a stand-alone reserves team in the NEAFL (in the Eastern Conference while it existed). The team was originally known as the University of Western Sydney (UWS) Giants, then the Western Sydney University Giants, in acknowledgment a broad partnership between the football club and the university (which changed its name in 2016), and then finally as simply Greater Western Sydney Giants: from a football perspective, the UWS Giants team is entirely managed by GWS as a stand-alone team.
- From 2021 – field a stand-alone reserves team in the VFL.

Sydney

- Until 1981 – based in Melbourne and known as the South Melbourne Football Club, fielded a reserves team in the VFL reserves.
- 1982–1999 – the senior team relocated to Sydney, but continued to field a reserves team in the VFL reserves/AFL reserves/VSFL.
- 2000–2002 – partially affiliated with the Port Melbourne Football Club in the VFL, and also fielded a stand-alone reserves team known as the Redbacks in the Sydney AFL. In practice, Port Melbourne served as a reserves affiliation for up to six experienced players, and the Redbacks served as a development team for inexperienced players.
- 2003–2010 – fielded a stand-alone reserves team in AFL Canberra.
- 2011–2019 – fielded a stand-alone reserves team in the NEAFL (in the Eastern Conference while it existed).
- From 2021 – field a stand-alone reserves team in the VFL.

== Push towards stand-alone reserves teams in the 2000s ==
Starting in around 2011, there was considerable interest by many AFL clubs in abandoning league affiliations or host-club arrangements to form stand-alone reserves teams.

A large contributing factor to this interest was the perception that the developmental autonomy Geelong and Collingwood enjoyed as the only two clubs fielding stand-alone reserves teams in the VFL was responsible for the very strong senior AFL performances of those two clubs between 2007 and 2011, during which time they won four of the five AFL premierships.

From 2003 to 2007, Geelong had won 67 of 118 AFL matches despite being the only AFL club to maintain a standalone VFL team in this time, or continually since the dissolution of the AFL Reserves competition at the end of 1999.

In Victoria, some VFL clubs with a strong existing identity were also interested in ending their AFL affiliations after the strong performance of stand-alone VFL side Port Melbourne in its unbeaten 2011 season.

This represented a shift from the prevailing thinking of the 1990s when the affiliations were arranged: at that time, particularly during the early 1990s recession, many clubs' finances were tight, so operating costs drove many decisions.

At that time, some Victorian AFL clubs favoured the establishment of a WAFL/SANFL style of affiliation, with reserves players scattered throughout the VFL, because it would result in minimising management costs for these AFL clubs. The desire for teams to re-establish stand-alone reserves teams came at a time when most clubs were in a much stronger financial position: the total licence and running costs for a stand-alone team were estimated to be $500,000 per year in 2011.

Through the 2000s, the AFL preferred that its Victorian clubs retained VFL-affiliations, and offered a disincentive in the form of an inflated licence fee for fielding a stand-alone team; however, the AFL did not otherwise prevent teams from fielding stand-alone reserves teams if they were willing to do so and able to pay the fee.

In South Australia and Western Australia, the debate became more heated than in Victoria: the league affiliation system primarily benefited the state leagues, by helping to ensure that none of their clubs gained an undue advantage through preferential access to professional AFL-listed players, and by helping to minimise the drain of talent from the league, but this was to the detriment of player development at the AFL clubs, since reserves players end up playing for a variety of different teams, under a variety of different game-plans, and not necessarily in the positions that the AFL clubs would prefer.

As early as 1988 - the West Coast Eagles' second season in the VFL/AFL - senior coach John Todd proposed that the Eagles enter a team in the VFL Reserves competition, but the West Australian Football Commission point-blank rejected his proposal.

From 2011, Adelaide, Port Adelaide, Fremantle and West Coast all actively sought to establish stand-alone reserves teams. There was considerable opposition from the SANFL and WAFL clubs about including these reserves teams in the state leagues, with these clubs concerned about the impact this would have on depth of talent, league competitiveness, gate takings, and existing clubs' viability: consequently, both the WAFL and SANFL on several occasions flatly rejected proposals for any AFL club's reserves team to compete in these leagues.

In Western Australia, a wide range of compromise solutions was proposed, including stand-alone reserves teams playing the WAFL clubs in a separate competition during their WAFL bye weeks, a new secondary league including reserves teams from the Western Australian and South Australian AFL clubs, or a return to host-club arrangements. In October 2012, the Western Australian clubs reached a compromise, with two WAFL clubs, Peel and East Perth, forming host club arrangements with Fremantle and West Coast.

In 2017, East Perth and West Coast mutually agreed to dissolve this arrangement, with West Coast fielding a WAFL team since 2019, with the arrangement between Peel and Fremantle remaining in place as of 2023.

In South Australia, Adelaide announced its intention to establish a stand-alone reserves team, but maintained that it would not enter it in the SANFL without full support from all SANFL clubs. However, with the reversal of Norwood's publicly stated opposition to AFL stand-alone involvement, the SANFL gained the constitutionally required two-thirds majority support in August 2013.

Despite failing to obtain the support of either South Adelaide or Central District, Adelaide has fielded a reserves side in the SANFL senior level since 2014 (except in 2020).

Port Adelaide's situation remained unresolved at the time, since it wanted to operate the Port Adelaide Magpies SANFL team as its host club in the SANFL seniors. This desire led to an impasse, as the South Australian Football Commission required that Port Adelaide shut down its Under-18s and Under-16s teams and surrender its SANFL recruiting zones, thereby severing its connection with the community, in order to continue with this arrangement, which the club was highly reluctant to do.

Subsequently, a compromise deal was made with the SANFL: in exchange for the club shutting down its Under-18s and Under-16s teams and surrendering its SANFL recruiting zones, they could continue the arrangement, with the club being granted permission to field an academy team in the SANFL Reserves competition.

At the end of the 2018 SANFL season, Port Adelaide withdrew from the SANFL Reserves after 106 years of competition, with Port Adelaide and the SANFL mutually agreeing to shut down the academy team.

== Other notes ==
In 2020, AFL-listed players were not permitted to compete in state-level football in any capacity due to the requirements of the quarantine bubbles set up to complete the 2020 AFL season amidst the COVID-19 pandemic.

As a result, all of the affiliations in this page were suspended during the season.

== AFL Women's reserves arrangements ==
In 2017 the AFL Women's (AFLW) competition was launched, with semi-professional female footballers gaining the opportunity to compete in a national league. Initially, eight AFL clubs were granted a license to compete in the league, which increased to 10 teams in 2019, and to 14 teams in 2021: with Essendon, Hawthorn, Port Adelaide and Sydney receiving AFLW licenses in 2022, all clubs now field an AFLW team.

For 2021 and 2022, most female state leagues and local competitions were aligned with the length of the AFLW season: this situation ended with the AFLW changing its season to run between August and November in Season 7 (the second season in 2022).

The current situation for AFLW-listed players not selected for their senior team is as follows:

AFLW club	Reserves arrangement	Affiliated club(s)	Affiliated league
Adelaide	Players from South Australia play for the club they were originally drafted from. Other players are randomly assigned to a particular club.	Multiple	SANFLW
Brisbane	Players from Queensland play for a club they have "long-standing" connections with. Other players are assigned to a particular club, with personal preference and proximity being key factors.	Multiple	QAFLW
Carlton	Stand-alone reserves team	Carlton	VFLW
Collingwood	Stand-alone reserves team	Collingwood	VFLW
Essendon	Stand-alone reserves team	Essendon	VFLW
Fremantle	Players from Western Australia play for the club they were originally drafted from. Other players are randomly assigned to a particular club.	Multiple	WAFLW
Geelong	Stand-alone reserves team	Geelong	VFLW
Gold Coast	Players from Queensland play for a club they have "long-standing" connections with. Other players are assigned to a particular club, with personal preference and proximity being key factors.	Multiple	QAFLW
Greater Western Sydney	As the AFL Sydney women's competition is currently held outside the AFLW season, unselected GWS players usually take part in an extra training session/practice match, typically on the morning of the Giants' AFLW match.	None	None
Hawthorn	Club affiliation	Box Hill	VFLW
Melbourne	Club affiliation Non-selected Melbourne players play for the Casey Demons, a team owned by the Casey Football Club though co-managed by Melbourne's AFLW program.	Casey Demons	VFLW
North Melbourne	Stand-alone reserves team	North Melbourne	VFLW
Port Adelaide	Players from South Australia play for the club they were originally drafted from. Other players are randomly assigned to a particular club.	Multiple	SANFLW
Richmond	Club affiliation: non-selected Richmond players play for independent club Port Melbourne. In 2018 and 2019, Richmond fielded a dedicated reserves team.	Port Melbourne	VFLW
St Kilda	Club affiliation: non-selected St Kilda players play for the Southern Saints, a team whose license was originally owned by St Kilda, but was transferred to independent VFL club Sandringham in 2020. The two clubs co-manage the team.	Southern Saints	VFLW
Sydney	As the AFL Sydney women's competition is currently held outside the AFLW season, unselected Sydney players usually take part in an extra training session/practice match, typically on the morning of the Swans' AFLW match.	None	None
West Coast	Players from Western Australia play for the club they were originally drafted from. Other players are randomly assigned to a particular club.	Multiple	WAFLW
Western Bulldogs	Stand-alone reserves team	Western Bulldogs	VFLW

== See also ==
- New South Wales Australian Football League
- North East Australian Football League
- Northern Territory Football League
- Queensland Australian Football League
- South Australian National Football League
- Tasmanian Football League
- Victorian Football League
- West Australian Football League
- National Rugby League reserves affiliations
