= Brendon Moore =

Australian rules footballer

Personal information
- Born: 9 August 1969 (age 57)
- Original team: Pines (Frankston)
- Height: 176 cm (5 ft 9 in)
- Weight: 69 kg (152 lb)

Playing career^{1}
Years	Club	Games (Goals)
1987–1990	Essendon	7 (1)
- ^{1} Playing statistics correct to the end of 1990.

Brendon Moore (born 9 August 1969) is a former Australian rules footballer who played with Essendon in the Victorian/Australian Football League (VFL/AFL).

Moore played 7 senior games for Essendon, over four seasons. A Pines Football Club recruit, he appeared in the final round of the 1987 VFL season, played four further games in 1988 and another two in 1990, after not playing senior football in 1989.

A left footed midfielder, Moore returned to his original club in 1991 and won a best and fairest for Pines in 1992. He then left the Mornington Peninsula Nepean Football League to play for Frankston in the Victorian Football Association (later renamed VFL) from 1993 to 1998. During his time at Frankston he captained the club. In his final two seasons, Moore won back to back Frank Johnson Medals, for his performances when representing the VFL. He went back to Pines in 1999 as captain-coach and took them to the 2002 grand final, which they to Edithvale-Aspendale. In 2000 he won the league's best and fairest award.
