= Stuart Nicol =

Australian rules footballer (born 1966)

Personal information
- Full name: Stuart Nicol
- Born: 30 September 1966 (age 60)
- Height: 193 cm (6 ft 4 in)
- Weight: 87 kg (192 lb)
- Positions: Centre half forward/back, ruck

Playing career^{1}
Years	Club	Games (Goals)
1986–87, 89–91	Springvale	90 (?)
1988–89	Footscray	7 (4)
1992–95	Woodville-West Torrens	80 (?)
- ^{1} Playing statistics correct to the end of 1995.

Stuart Nicol (born 30 September 1966) is a former Australian rules footballer who played for Footscray in the Victorian Football League (VFL) during the late 1980s.

Nicol kicked a goal on his league debut, which Footscray lost to North Melbourne, when another debutant in John Longmire kicked four goals. He made a further five appearances that year and just one the following season, his last. Nicol played Centre half forward in Footscray Reserves 1988 premiership team.

Playing for Springvale, Nicol was one of four winners of the VFA's J. J. Liston Trophy in 1990. Nicol played Centre half forward in the Springvale 1987 premiership team.

After an impressive VFA career, Nicol moved to Woodville-West Torrens in the SANFL. In his first year in 1992 he took the most marks in the competition and finished fourth in the Magarey Medal behind Nathan Buckley. As a ruckman/forward, the following year Nicol played in the Woodville-West Torrens inaugural premiership team, with a Grand Final victory over Norwood. In 1994, Nicol played in the SANFL representative team against the West Australian Football League (WAFL). Nicol was chosen in the Advertiser SANFL team of the year in both 1992 and 1994.
