= Phil Maylin =

Australian rules footballer and coach

Personal information
- Born: 20 April 1956 (age 70); Royal Park, South Australia
- Original team: Woodville (SANFL)
- Debut: Round 1, 1980, Carlton vs. Collingwood, at Victoria Park
- Height: 175 cm (5 ft 9 in)
- Weight: 76 kg (168 lb)

Playing career^{1}
Years	Club	Games (Goals)
1974-1979	Woodville	109 (52)
1980–1984	Carlton	89 (48)
1985–1986	Footscray	33 (8)
1987–1988	Springvale	41 (34)
Total		272 (142)
- ^{1} Playing statistics correct to the end of 1986.

Phil Maylin (born 20 April 1956) is a former Australian rules footballer who played with Carlton and Footscray in the Victorian Football League (VFL) during the 1980s.

Originally from Adelaide, Maylin played for Royal Park before debuting for Woodville in the South Australian National Football League (SANFL). Recruited by Carlton prior to the 1980 VFL season, a utility, Maylin finished second in Carlton's 1982 Best and Fairest award and played mainly as a ruck-rover and midfielder.

Maylin was a premiership player with Carlton in 1981 and 1982 but later struggled to hold his place in the side and transferred to Footscray for the 1985 VFL season. Two years later he joined Springvale Football Club in the Victorian Football Association (VFA) as captain-coach and led them to a premiership in 1987. He coached Eltham from 2003 to 2008.
