= 1999 VFL season =

118th season of the Victorian Football League

- Teams: 11
- Premiers: Springvale; 5th premiership
- Minor premiers: Springvale; 2nd minor premiership

The 1999 VFL season was the 118th season of the Victorian Football League (VFL), a second-tier Australian rules football competition played in the state of Victoria.

The premiership was won by the Springvale Football Club, after defeating North Ballarat by 60 points in the Grand Final on 19 September. It was Springvale's fourth premiership in five seasons, and was North Ballarat's first Grand Final appearance.

== Ladder ==
Pos	Team	Pld	W	L	D	PF	PA	PP	Pts	Qualification
1	Springvale (P)	18	15	3	0	1903	1298	146.6	60	Finals series
2	Frankston	18	13	5	0	1777	1336	133.0	52	Finals series
3	Werribee	18	13	5	0	1830	1568	116.7	52	Finals series
4	North Ballarat	18	12	6	0	1533	1236	124.0	48	Finals series
5	Port Melbourne	18	12	6	0	1662	1428	116.4	48	Finals series
6	Sandringham	18	11	6	1	1939	1346	144.1	46	Finals series
7	Williamstown	18	8	10	0	1382	1604	86.2	32	
8	Box Hill	18	6	11	1	1636	1821	89.8	26	
9	Coburg-Fitzroy	18	4	14	0	1062	1813	58.6	16	
10	Preston	18	1	15	2	1350	1864	72.4	8	
11	Bendigo	18	2	16	0	1239	1999	62.0	8	

Source: AustralianFootball.com
Rules for classification: 1) points; 2) percentage; 3) number of points for.
(P) Premiers

== Finals ==
=== Qualifying and elimination finals ===
	Qualifying final
Saturday, 28 August (2:00 pm)	Springvale 15.19 (109)	def.	Frankston 6.9 (45)	North Port Oval

	First elimination final
Sunday, 29 August (2:00 pm)	North Ballarat 13.10 (88)	def.	Port Melbourne 10.12 (72)	Northern Oval

	Second elimination final
Sunday, 29 August (2:00 pm)	Werribee 9.5 (59)	def. by	Sandringham 11.12 (78)	North Port Oval

=== Semi-finals ===
	First semi-final
Sunday, 5 September (2:00pm)	Frankston 15.8 (98)	def. by	Sandringham 19.10 (124)	North Port Oval

	Second semi-final
Saturday, 4 September (2:00pm)	Springvale 12.8 (80)	def.	North Ballarat 6.14 (50)	North Port Oval

=== Preliminary final ===
	Preliminary final
Sunday, 12 September (2:00pm)	North Ballarat 22.14 (146)	def.	Sandringham 10.6 (66)	North Port Oval

=== Grand Final ===
1999 VFL Grand Final
Sunday 19 September (2:00 pm)	Springvale	def.	North Ballarat	North Port Oval (crowd: 6,212)
3.0 (18); 9.3 (57); 13.7 (85); 19.11 (125)	Q1; Q2; Q3; Final	3.4 (22); 3.7 (25); 5.10 (40); 9.11 (65)	Norm Goss Memorial Medal: Daniel Donati (Springvale)
Smith 5, O'Brien 4, Ford 3, Sheahan 2, C. Clarke, Delaure, Knight, O'Donnell, Passador	Goals	Sier 2, Clarke, Edwards, Fisher, Frith, Jurica, G. Polkinghorne, Smart

== Awards ==
- The Jim 'Frosty' Miller Medal was won by Nick Sautner (Sandringham), who kicked 82 goals.
- The J. J. Liston Trophy was won by John Georgiou (Frankston), who polled 21 votes. Georgiou tied on votes with Mark Brebner (Box Hill), but Brebner was ineligible to share the award, having been twice suspended during the year.
- The Fothergill–Round Medal was won by Mark Passador (Springvale).
- North Ballarat won the reserves premiership for the second consecutive year. North Ballarat 9.6 (60) defeated Springvale 7.15 (57) in the Grand Final, held as a curtain-raiser to the Seniors Grand Final on 19 September.

== Notable events ==
- The Jim 'Frosty' Miller Medal was struck as a new award for the leading goalkicker in the home-and-away season. The award was named after Dandenong full-forward Jim 'Frosty' Miller, who kicked 885 goals in a career spanning 1967–1977.
- Cash-strapped Coburg entered a partnership with the Fitzroy Football Club during the season. Fitzroy, which had played in the VFA between 1884 and 1896, then in the VFL/AFL from 1897 until 1996, no longer operated a football team following the creation of the Brisbane Lions in late 1996, but it still had an administrative presence. Under what was effectively a sponsorship arrangement, Coburg became known as the Coburg-Fitzroy Lions, taking its new name at the beginning of August. The club retained navy blue and red as its main colours, but adopted Fitzroy's red, royal blue and gold colours as an alternative strip.
