= Athol Hodgetts =

Australian Rules Footballer and Administrator

Personal information
- Full name: Athol Raymond Hodgetts
- Born: 20 January 1951 (age 75)
- Original team: Cooee

Playing career^{1}
Years	Club	Games (Goals)
1971–1972	North Melbourne	9 (15)
- ^{1} Playing statistics correct to the end of 1972.

Athol Raymond Hodgetts (born 20 January 1951) is a former Australian rules football player and administrator, who played for North Melbourne in the Victorian Football League (VFL), and served as the executive director of the Victorian Football Association. Hodgetts is a member of the Tasmanian Football Hall of Fame and is also a Hall of Fame Member of the Coburg Football Club.

Originally from north-western Tasmania, Hodgetts was a key forward who played for Cooee in the North Western Football Union. Aged 19, he made his interstate debut for Tasmania in 1970, and he kicked three goals from full forward in his state's two-point victory against Western Australia, a famous game which has since been inducted into the Tasmanian Football Hall of Fame. He was cleared to North Melbourne in the VFL in March 1971, and spent two seasons at North Melbourne, playing nine games and kicking fifteen goals. He returned to Cooee and was the NWFU leading goalkicker in 1973, then repeated the feat with Wynyard in 1974. In 1975 he was recruited by Coburg in the Victorian Football Association, where he won the club best and fairest in 1975.

After finishing his playing career, Hodgetts had a career in football administration and marketing. In 1979, Hodgetts became president of the Coburg Football Club, serving as the first full-time president of a VFA club, and he presided over the club's 1979 premiership, its first Division 1 premiership since 1928. He became marketing manager at the VFL's Essendon Football Club in 1981 and served in the role for much of the 1980s, earning acclaim for his ability to secure sponsorship. He was then appointed as the inaugural executive director of the VFA in November 1987. Hodgetts served in the role during a difficult period for the VFA from 1987 until June 1992, when rising player payments and declining attendances were sending many clubs broke; Hodgetts oversaw the contraction of the Association from two divisions to one division, which saw many weaker clubs fold or depart the VFA, and he was involved in securing weekly VFA television broadcasts for the first time since 1981, and in toughening the VFA's tribunal to clean up the association's violent image. Coburg coach Phil Cleary credited Hodgetts with delivering record levels of base sponsorship to the VFA, and with instilling greater professionalism within clubs.

Hodgetts returned to the VFL (which by this time was known as the AFL) in 1992, and served as marketing director at Carlton throughout the remainder of the 1990s. Under Hodgetts, Carlton became the first club to arrange a naming rights deal for its home ground, when Princes Park was renamed Optus Oval in November 1993; and in Round 3, 1997, he helped to arrange for the club to wear once-off sky blue guernseys to secure $250,000 in sponsorship from Mars in a cross-promotion for the company's new blue coloured M&M's – a promotion which, while it is often derided for its commercialism or simply as a poor fashion choice, turned out to be one of the most successful sponsorship events in Mars Australia's history and later influenced a major sponsorship deal between Carlton and Mars which began in 2010, long after Hodgetts' tenure at the club had finished.
