= 2009 VFL season =

- Teams: 13
- Premiers: North Ballarat; 2nd premiership
- Minor premiers: North Ballarat; 1st minor premiership

The 2009 Victorian Football League (VFL) was the 128th season of the Australian Rules Football competition. The premiership was won by the North Ballarat Football Club, which defeated the Northern Bullants by 23 points in the Grand Final on 25 September. It was North Ballarat's second consecutive premiership, and the second in the club's history.

== League membership and affiliations ==
At the end of the 2008 season, the Tasmanian Devils Football Club withdrew from the VFL and disbanded. AFL Tasmania, which operated the club, was focussed on re-establishing the Tasmanian Football League as a statewide competition in 2009, after an eight-year hiatus since the original statewide league's collapse at the end of 2000, and having the Tasmanian VFL club competing for attention and players did not fit with this vision. As a result, the VFL was reduced to thirteen clubs.

Additionally, two pairs of VFL-AFL reserves affiliations were altered:

- Melbourne ended its nine-year affiliation with Sandringham and entered a new affiliation with the Casey Scorpions.
- St Kilda ended its eight-year affiliation with the Casey Scorpions and entered a new affiliation with Sandringham.

As a result, the size of the VFL was reduced to thirteen teams: nine VFL-AFL affiliates, two AFL reserves team, and two stand-alone VFL teams.

== Ladder ==
2009 VFL season
Pos	Team	Pld	W	L	D	PF	PA	PP	Pts	
1	North Ballarat (P)	18	14	4	0	1649	1284	128.4	56	Finals
2	Williamstown	18	13	5	0	2002	1506	132.9	52	Finals
3	Northern Bullants	18	12	6	0	1751	1516	115.5	48	Finals
4	Port Melbourne	18	12	6	0	1685	1476	114.2	48	Finals
5	Box Hill	18	12	6	0	1654	1574	105.1	48	Finals
6	Casey	18	10	8	0	1693	1355	124.9	40	Finals
7	Collingwood reserves	18	10	8	0	1598	1476	108.3	40	Finals
8	Geelong reserves	18	9	9	0	1661	1753	94.8	36	Finals
9	Werribee	18	8	10	0	1605	1664	96.5	32	
10	Sandringham	18	7	11	0	1660	1593	104.2	28	
11	Coburg	18	7	11	0	1733	1810	95.7	28	
12	Frankston	18	3	15	0	1286	1930	66.6	12	
13	Bendigo	18	0	18	0	1223	2263	54.0	0	

Rules for classification: 1) points; 2) percentage; 3) number of points for.
(P) Premiers

== Finals series ==
Qualifying and elimination finals
1	North Ballarat	15.8 (98)
4	Port Melbourne	6.14 (50)
Sep. 6, TEAC Oval
5	Box Hill	17.19 (121)
8	Geelong	13.9 (87)
Sep. 5, TEAC Oval
6	Casey Scorpions	9.8 (62)
7	Collingwood	26.21 (177)
Sep. 6, Burbank Oval
2	Williamstown	6.13 (49)
3	Northern Bullants	11.12 (78)

Semi-finals
Sep. 13, TEAC Oval
Port Melbourne	19.14 (128)
Box Hill	19.10 (124)
Sep. 12, TEAC Oval
Williamstown	7.12 (54)
Collingwood	13.16 (94)

Preliminary finals
Sep. 19, TEAC Oval
North Ballarat	22.14 (146)
Collingwood	12.13 (85)
Sep. 20, TEAC Oval
Northern Bullants	16.13 (109)
Port Melbourne	13.10 (88)

Grand final
Sep. 25, Etihad Stadium
North Ballarat	14.7 (91)
Northern Bullants	10.8 (68)

=== Awards ===
- The Jim 'Frosty' Miller Medal was won by Nick Sautner (Sandringham) for the ninth time in his career. Sautner kicked 71 goals for the season.
- The J. J. Liston Trophy was by Myles Sewell (North Ballarat), who polled 18 votes. Sewell finished ahead of Michael Barlow (Werribee), who was second with 16 votes, and James Podsiadly (Geelong) and Sam Iles (Box Hill), who were equal third with 15 votes.
- The Fothergill–Round Medal was won by Michael Barlow (Werribee).
- Box Hill won the reserves premiership. Box Hill 16.18 (114) defeated Sandringham 13.6 (84) in the Grand Final, held as a curtain-raiser to the seniors second preliminary final on 20 September.

== Notable events ==
- The Bendigo Bombers could not play at their home ground Queen Elizabeth Oval after May because the surface was deemed unfit for VFL football. Bendigo's remaining home games were transferred to Windy Hill (the training ground of its AFL affiliate, Essendon).
- The VFL introduced the "23rd man rule". Under the rule, the size of the playing squad was increased to twenty-three (still with eighteen players on the field, but increasing the size of the interchange bench from four to five), provided the 23rd player was a top-age player currently in the TAC Cup, or an undrafted player who had played in the TAC Cup during the previous year. The rule was designed to provide additional senior football opportunities to promising juniors, and improve the alignments between VFL clubs and their TAC Cup affiliates.
