= Paul Dooley (footballer) =

Australian rules footballer (born 1975)

Personal information
- Full name: Paul Dooley
- Born: 3 October 1975 (age 51)
- Original teams: St Peter's, East Bentleigh
- Height: 196 cm (6 ft 5 in)
- Weight: 97 kg (214 lb)
- Position: Ruckman

Playing career^{1}
| Years | Club | Games (Goals) |
| 1998–2001 | Western Bulldogs | 14 (2) |
- ^{1} Playing statistics correct to the end of 2001.

Career highlights
- Fothergill–Round–Mitchell Medal: 1996

Paul Dooley (born 3 October 1975) is a former Australian rules footballer who played for the Western Bulldogs in the Australian Football League (AFL).

Dooley played initially at Melbourne where he appeared at reserves level. He joined Williamstown in 1994 and won the J. J. Liston Trophy in a stellar 1996 season, where he also won the Club best and fairest and the Ron James MVP as well as the Fothergill–Round Medal. He won the Frank Johnson Medal in 2002, his last year at Williamstown before a knee injury ended his career. Dooley played a total of 41 senior games for the Seagulls, booting 11 goals, and was selected as a ruckman in the WFC 1990s Team-of-the-Decade.

After being drafted by the Western Bulldogs, he found it had to break into the seniors as they already had established ruckmen in Luke Darcy and Scott Wynd. Dooley made his debut in the opening round of the 1998 AFL season and kicked a goal with his first kick in league football. He was not picked again for the rest of the year and spent the entire 1999 season in the seconds. Eventually returning to the seniors in 2000, he participated in eight games, including his club's famous win over Essendon, their only loss of the season.
