= Graham Dempster =

Australian rules footballer

Personal information
- Full name: Graham Dempster
- Born: 14 January 1955 (age 71)
- Original team: Springvale (VFA)
- Height: 192 cm (6 ft 4 in)
- Weight: 83 kg (183 lb)

Playing career^{1}
Years	Club	Games (Goals)
1972–1979	South Melbourne	64 (24)
- ^{1} Playing statistics correct to the end of 1979.

Graham Dempster (born 14 January 1955) is a former Australian rules footballer who played with South Melbourne in the Victorian Football League (VFL) during the 1970s.

Recruited from Victorian Football Association (VFA) club Springvale, Dempster spent much of his time at South Melbourne in defence but was also used up forward to good effect later in his VFL career. After making his debut as a 17-year-old in 1972, Dempster played only 25 games in his first four seasons, but made 18 appearances in 1976. He kicked a career best five goals in a win over Footscray at Western Oval in 1977, having also kicked four goals the previous week. His last game of the year was an elimination final, the only final he would play for South Melbourne. He then ruptured a medial ligament in his knee during the opening round of the 1978 season and missed the rest of the year as a result. The 1979 season was his last at South Melbourne and he played just seven games.

Dempster would go on to become a premiership-winning player with Springvale and was still competing for the club in the early 1990s, captaining them in 1991.

He is the father of Sydney and St Kilda footballer Sean Dempster, who was drafted under the father–son rule.
