= Jack Aziz =

Australian rules footballer

Joşkun "Jack" Aziz (born 1968) is a former Australian rules football player. He won two Jim 'Frosty' Miller Medals as the leading goal-kicker in the Victorian Football Association in 1993 and 1996.

== Biography ==
Aziz was born in Footscray, Victoria, Australia to Turkish Cypriot parents. He was contracted to Footscray Football Club as an 18-year-old, but was delisted after breaking his leg. He was then recruited by Williamstown Football Club from Albion FC and played at centre half-forward in the Seagulls' 1990 Grand final win. He played 66 games and kicked 97 goals for Williamstown from 1989 to 1992, including the 1989 and 1992 grand finals. He was selected on a half-forward flank in the Williamstown 1990's Team of the Decade.

In 1993 Aziz moved to the Werribee Football Club. At Werribee, Aziz won two Jim 'Frosty' Miller Medals as the leading goal-kicker in 1993 and 1996. As of 2012, Aziz is the record holder for goals kicked by a Werribee Tigers player.
