= Kain Taylor =

Australian rules footballer

Personal information
- Full name: Kain Taylor
- Born: 14 October 1967 (age 59)
- Original team: Dingley
- Height: 180 cm (5 ft 11 in)
- Weight: 75 kg (165 lb)
- Position: Utility

Playing career^{1}
Years	Club	Games (Goals)
1986–1994	St Kilda	76 (20)
- ^{1} Playing statistics correct to the end of 1994.

Kain Taylor (born 14 October 1967) is a former Australian rules footballer who played for St Kilda in the Victorian/Australian Football League (VFL/AFL).

Recruited from Dingley, Taylor was a utility often used as a tagger. He featured only occasionally in the late 1980s but played a career high 17 games in 1990 and the following year appeared in an Elimination Final against Geelong.

He later played some good football with Springvale, which he captained to premierships in 1996, 1998 and 1999. His performance in the 1996 VFL Grand Final earned him the Norm Goss Memorial Medal.
