= Shayne Smith (footballer) =

Australian rules footballer (born 1975)

Personal information
- Full name: Shayne Smith
- Born: 12 June 1975 (age 51)
- Original team: Southern Stingrays
- Draft: 61st, 1993 National Draft
- Height: 190 cm (6 ft 3 in)
- Weight: 94 kg (207 lb)

Playing career^{1}
Years	Club	Games (Goals)
1994	Sydney	4 (1)
- ^{1} Playing statistics correct to the end of 1994.

Shayne Smith (born 12 June 1975) is a former Australian rules footballer who played for the Sydney Swans in the Australian Football League (AFL).

A key forward, Smith was drafted from TAC Cup side the Southern Stingrays. He played only four senior games for Sydney, all in the 1994 AFL season.

Smith was a prolific forward for Springvale in the Victorian Football League. His goal tally of 470 is a club record. In 1997 he kicked 107 goals, to become the first player since Jamie Shaw in 1990 to score a century of goals in a season. He won the VFA Leading Goalkicker Medal that year and again in 1998.
