= Victorian State Football League =

Football League

The Victorian State Football League (VSFL) was an Australian rules football governing body.

The VSFL was established at the end of 1991 to take over administration of football in Victoria from the Australian Football League, which was now becoming pre-occupied with administration of the game nationally.

The VSFL ran the AFL reserves competition from 1992 until 1999, which was also known as the VSFL from 1992 until 1994. The body also ran the Under-18s competition now known as the Talent League. At the end of 1994, the VSFL took over administration of the Victorian Football Association competition (which was renamed the Victorian Football League in 1996).

At the end of 1999, the VSFL was succeeded in an administrative capacity by Football Victoria (now known as AFL Victoria).
