= 2013 VFL season =

132nd season of the Victorian Football League

- Date: 31 March – 22 September 2013
- Teams: 14
- Premiers: Box Hill; 2nd premiership
- Minor premiers: Geelong; 2nd minor premiership
- Leading goalkicker: Dean Galea (Port Melbourne – 55 goals)
- Matches played: 135

The 2013 VFL season was the 132nd of the Victorian Football League (VFL), a second-tier Australian rules football competition played in the state of Victoria.

The premiership was won by Box Hill who defeated Geelong by 21 points in the 2013 VFL Grand Final.

== League membership and affiliations ==
Prior to the 2013 season, Essendon ended its ten-year reserves affiliation with the Bendigo Football Club. Essendon began fielding its own reserves team in the VFL, and Bendigo continued to contest the VFL as a stand-alone senior team.

== Foxtel Cup ==
The top two non-AFL clubs from the 2012 VFL season – Port Melbourne and Werribee – competed in the 2013 Foxtel Cup. Werribee progressed the further of the two teams, losing its semi-final against WAFL club East Fremantle.

== Home-and-away season ==
Source: VFL Season 2013 Results

=== Round 1 ===
	Round 1
Sunday 31 March (2:00 pm)	Geelong 12.16 (88)	def.	Williamstown 11.14 (80)	Spring Creek Reserve
Friday 5 April (6:30 pm)	Bendigo 8.9 (57)	def. by	Essendon 23.9 (147)	Queen Elizabeth Oval
Saturday 6 April (1:10 pm)	Collingwood 16.11 (107)	def.	North Ballarat 6.19 (55)	Victoria Park
Saturday 6 April (7:00 pm)	Werribee 17.13 (115)	def. by	Northern Blues 20.10 (130)	Avalon Airport Oval
Sunday 7 April (2:00 pm)	Box Hill 13.11 (89)	def. by	Port Melbourne 14.9 (93)	Box Hill City Oval (crowd: 1,525)
Sunday 7 April (2:00 pm)	Casey 23.11 (149)	def.	Frankston 12.9 (81)	Casey Fields
Sunday 7 April (2:00 pm)	Coburg 18.13 (121)	def.	Sandringham 14.9 (93)	Mantello Holden Oval
The Round 16 match between Port Melbourne and Werribee was brought forward to the opening weekend of the season to accommodate their Foxtel Cup fixture. The match was played on Saturday 30 March.

=== Round 2 ===
	Round 2
Saturday 13 April (1:00 pm)	Northern Blues 30.16 (196)	def.	Bendigo 4.8 (32)	Visy Park
Saturday 13 April (1:10 pm)	Williamstown 24.13 (157)	def.	Coburg 8.9 (57)	Burbank Oval
Saturday 13 April (2:00 pm)	North Ballarat 12.14 (86)	def. by	Casey 13.17 (95)	Eureka Stadium
Saturday 13 April (2:00 pm)	Essendon 10.13 (73)	def. by	Box Hill 12.12 (84)	Windy Hill (crowd: 5,000)
Saturday 13 April (7:00 pm)	Werribee 12.14 (86)	def.	Collingwood 11.12 (78)	Avalon Airport Oval
Sunday 14 April (1:00 pm)	Geelong 15.21 (111)	def.	Sandringham 12.7 (79)	Simonds Stadium
Sunday 14 April (2:00 pm)	Frankston 14.14 (98)	def.	Port Melbourne 12.20 (92)	Frankston Park

=== Round 3 ===
	Round 3
Friday 19 April (6:30 pm)	Bendigo 7.14 (56)	def. by	North Ballarat 21.15 (141)	Queen Elizabeth Oval
Saturday 20 April (1:00 pm)	Essendon 11.13 (79)	def. by	Casey 25.12 (162)	Windy Hill
Saturday 20 April (1:10 pm)	Geelong 12.17 (89)	def.	Box Hill 12.12 (84)	Simonds Stadium
Saturday 20 April (2:00 pm)	Collingwood 12.11 (83)	def. by	Frankston 14.12 (96)	Victoria Park
Sunday 21 April (2:00 pm)	Williamstown 19.15 (129)	def.	Werribee 5.16 (46)	Burbank Oval
Sunday 21 April (2:00 pm)	Port Melbourne 16.12 (108)	drew with	Sandringham 16.12 (108)	Frankston Park
Sunday 21 April (2:00 pm)	Coburg 15.13 (103)	def. by	Northern Blues 19.15 (129)	Mantello Holden Oval

=== Round 4 ===
	Round 4
Friday 26 April (6:30 pm)	Bendigo 9.6 (60)	def. by	Collingwood 25.26 (176)	Queen Elizabeth Oval
Saturday 27 April (1:10 pm)	Werribee 15.10 (100)	def. by	Sandringham 24.20 (164)	Avalon Airport Oval
Saturday 27 April (2:00 pm)	Box Hill 18.15 (123)	def.	Coburg 13.17 (95)	Box Hill City Oval (crowd: 1,435)
Saturday 27 April (2:00 pm)	North Ballarat 8.12 (60)	def. by	Essendon 14.12 (96)	Eureka Stadium
Saturday 27 April (6:00 pm)	Casey 14.8 (92)	def.	Williamstown 9.15 (69)	Casey Fields
Sunday 28 April (2:00 pm)	Frankston 7.10 (52)	def. by	Geelong 19.17 (131)	Frankston Park
Sunday 28 April (2:00 pm)	Northern Blues 13.13 (91)	def. by	Port Melbourne 16.11 (107)	Preston City Oval

=== Round 5 ===
	Round 5
Saturday 4 May (11:00 am)	Geelong 21.14 (140)	def.	Werribee 12.13 (85)	Simonds Stadium
Saturday 4 May (1:10 pm)	Coburg 19.11 (125)	def.	Essendon 13.13 (91)	Mantello Holden Oval
Saturday 4 May (2:00 pm)	North Ballarat 20.10 130)	def.	Frankston 12.13 (85)	Eureka Stadium
Saturday 4 May (2:00 pm)	Port Melbourne 15.11 (101)	def.	Casey 14.14 (98)	North Port Oval
Saturday 4 May (2:30 pm)	Bendigo 7.6 (48)	def. by	Box Hill 20.15 (135)	Queen Elizabeth Oval
Sunday 5 May (2:00 pm)	Williamstown 15.13 (103)	def.	Collingwood 14.13 (97)	Burbank Oval
Sunday 5 May (2:00 pm)	Sandringham 20.10 (130)	def.	Northern Blues 18.9 (117)	Trevor Barker Beach Oval

=== State Game ===
	2013 State Game
Saturday 11 May (12:10 pm)	WAFL 17.16 (118)	def.	VFL 15.11 (101)	Jubilee Oval, Northam	Report
Frank Johnson Medal (VFL): Chris Cain; Simpson Medal (WAFL): Wayde Twomey

=== Round 6 ===
	Round 6
Saturday 18 May (1:00 pm)	Collingwood 18.12 (120)	def.	Geelong 16.11 (107)	Victoria Park
Saturday 18 May (1:00 pm)	Essendon 11.16 (82)	def. by	Port Melbourne 13.16 (94)	Windy Hill
Saturday 18 May (1:10 pm)	Casey 9.12 (66)	def. by	Box Hill 19.12 (126)	Casey Fields
Saturday 18 May (2:00 pm)	Werribee 27.10 (172)	def.	Coburg 12.11 (83)	Avalon Airport Oval
Saturday 18 May (2:00 pm)	Bendigo 9.11 (65)	def. by	Sandringham 21.15 (141)	Queen Elizabeth Oval
Saturday 18 May (2:00 pm)	Northern Blues 12.11 (83)	def.	North Ballarat 5.9 (39)	Visy Park
Sunday 19 May (2:00 pm)	Frankston 15.11 (101)	def. by	Williamstown 20.11 (131)	Frankston Park

=== Round 7 ===
	Round 7
Saturday 25 May (1:00 pm)	Williamstown 30.27 (207)	def.	Bendigo 5.1 (31)	Burbank Oval
Saturday 25 May (1:00 pm)	Collingwood 18.14 (122)	def.	Essendon 17.11 (113)	Victoria Park
Saturday 25 May (1:10 pm)	Port Melbourne 16.16 (112)	def.	Coburg 8.9 (57)	North Port Oval
Saturday 25 May (2:00 pm)	North Ballarat 14.7 (91)	def. by	Box Hill 17.12 (114)	Eureka Stadium
Sunday 26 May (1:00 pm)	Geelong 16.11 (107)	def. by	Casey 18.12 (120)	Simonds Stadium
	Bye; Frankston, Northern Blues, Sandringham, Werribee

=== Round 8 ===
	Round 8
Saturday 1 June (1:00 pm)	Essendon 13.10 (88)	def. by	Geelong 18.17 (125)	Windy Hill
Saturday 1 June (1:10 pm)	Northern Blues 17.9 (111)	def. by	Collingwood 17.12 (114)	Preston City Oval (crowd: 2,000)
Saturday 1 June (2:00 pm)	Sandringham 8.10 (58)	def. by	Casey 18.15 (123)	Trevor Barker Beach Oval
Sunday 2 June (1:00 pm)	Werribee 14.17 (101)	def.	North Ballarat 10.16 (76)	Avalon Airport Oval
Sunday 2 June (2:00 pm)	Box Hill 18.23 (131)	def.	Frankston 8.7 (55)	Box Hill City Oval (crowd: 1,029)
Sunday 2 June (2:00 pm)	Williamstown 9.12 (66)	def. by	Port Melbourne 16.17 (113)	Burbank Oval
Sunday 2 June (2:00 pm)	Coburg 11.22 (88)	def.	Bendigo 11.12 (78)	Mantello Holden Oval

=== Round 9 ===
	Round 9
Saturday 8 June (1:00 pm)	Essendon 21.17 (143)	def.	Sandringham 12.9 (81)	Windy Hill
Saturday 8 June (1:10 pm)	Frankston 14.8 (92)	def. by	Werribee 20.11 (131)	Frankston Park
Saturday 8 June (2:00 pm)	Casey 21.15 (141)	def.	Collingwood 7.9 (51)	Casey Fields
Sunday 9 June (1:00 pm)	Geelong 15.13 (103)	def.	Northern Blues 5.15 (45)	Simonds Stadium
	Bye; Bendigo, Box Hill, Coburg, North Ballarat, Port Melbourne, Williamstown

=== Round 10 ===
	Round 10
Saturday 15 June (1:10 pm)	Northern Blues 19.15 (129)	def.	Frankston 11.7 (73)	Visy Park
Saturday 15 June (2:00 pm)	Bendigo 5.10 (40)	def. by	Werribee 19.18 (132)	Queen Elizabeth Oval
Sunday 16 June (2:00 pm)	Williamstown 15.11 (101)	def.	Essendon 6.10 (46)	Burbank Oval
Sunday 16 June (2:00 pm)	Port Melbourne 12.17 (89)	def. by	North Ballarat 15.9 (99)	North Port Oval
Sunday 16 June (2:00 pm)	Sandringham 12.11 (83)	def. by	Box Hill 12.17 (89)	Trevor Barker Beach Oval
Sunday 16 June (2:00 pm)	Collingwood 18.10 (118)	def.	Coburg 13.12 (90)	Victoria Park
	Bye; Geelong, Casey

=== Round 11 ===
	Round 11
Saturday 22 June (1:10 pm)	Geelong 21.17 (143)	def.	Port Melbourne 9.4 (58)	Simonds Stadium
Saturday 22 June (2:00 pm)	Werribee 10.12 (72)	def. by	Box Hill 17.13 (115)	Avalon Airport Oval
Saturday 22 June (2:00 pm)	Northern Blues 7.10 (52)	def. by	Williamstown 12.12 (84)	Visy Park
Sunday 23 June (2:00 pm)	Casey 16.15 (111)	def.	Coburg 9.10 (64)	Casey Fields
Sunday 23 June (2:00 pm)	North Ballarat 21.18 (144)	def.	Bendigo 3.8 (26)	Eureka Stadium
Sunday 23 June (2:00 pm)	Frankston 23.10 (148)	def.	Sandringham 8.4 (52)	Frankston Park
	Bye; Collingwood, Essendon

=== Round 12 ===
	Round 12
Saturday 29 June (1:00 pm)	Collingwood 11.9 (75)	def.	Port Melbourne 8.15 (63)	Victoria Park
Saturday 29 June (1:10 pm)	Casey 13.14 (92)	def.	Northern Blues 9.10 (64)	Casey Fields
Saturday 29 June (2:00 pm)	Werribee 16.13 (109)	def.	Essendon 11.14 (80)	Avalon Airport Oval
Saturday 29 June (2:00 pm)	North Ballarat 17.12 (114)	def.	Sandringham 15.10 (100)	Eureka Stadium
Saturday 29 June (2:30 pm)	Bendigo 9.12 (66)	def. by	Frankston 14.22 (106)	Queen Elizabeth Oval
Sunday 30 June (2:00 pm)	Box Hill 13.8 (86)	def. by	Williamstown 16.15 (111)	Box Hill City Oval (crowd: 2,089)
Sunday 30 June (2:00 pm)	Coburg 14.12 (96)	def. by	Geelong 16.19 (115)	Mantello Holden Oval

=== Round 13 ===
	Round 13
Saturday 6 July (11:00 am)	Geelong 18.19 (127)	def.	North Ballarat 7.11 (53)	Simonds Stadium
Saturday 6 July (1:10 pm)	Port Melbourne 22.21 (153)	def.	Bendigo 14.10 (94)	North Port Oval
Saturday 6 July (2:00 pm)	Box Hill 11.14 (80)	def. by	Collingwood 12.15 (87)	Box Hill City Oval (crowd: 3,314)
Sunday 7 July (2:00 pm)	Essendon 18.10 (118)	def.	Northern Blues 6.13 (49)	Windy Hill
Sunday 7 July (2:00 pm)	Frankston 14.13 (97)	def.	Coburg 7.11 (53)	Frankston Park
Saturday 13 July (1:10 pm)	Sandringham 14.11 (95)	def.	Williamstown 12.8 (80)	Trevor Barker Beach Oval
Sunday 14 July (2:00 pm)	Werribee 17.12 (114)	def.	Casey 8.10 (58)	Avalon Airport Oval

=== Round 14 ===
	Round 14
Friday 19 July (7:00 pm)	Geelong 17.15 (117)	def.	Collingwood 10.14 (74)	Simonds Stadium
Saturday 20 July (1:10 pm)	Box Hill 6.7 (43)	def. by	Northern Blues 9.5 (59)	Box Hill City Oval (crowd: 668)
Saturday 20 July (2:00 pm)	Port Melbourne 13.10 (88)	def.	Williamstown 2.7 (19)	North Port Oval
Sunday 21 July (2:00 pm)	Casey 9.4 (58)	def. by	Essendon 9.15 (69)	Casey Fields
Sunday 21 July (2:00 pm)	Frankston 3.5 (23)	def. by	North Ballarat 9.10 (64)	Frankston Park
Sunday 21 July (2:00 pm)	Coburg 9.12 (66)	def.	Werribee 9.9 (63)	Mantello Holden Oval
Sunday 21 July (2:00 pm)	Sandringham 17.22 (124)	def.	Bendigo 7.7 (49)	Trevor Barker Beach Oval
Frankston was found to have had 19 men on the field during a head count early in the third quarter. Following the match, Frankston's progress score at the time of the head count, 5.8 (38) was deducted from its final score; as such, its score was amended from 8.13 (61) to 3.5 (23), and the result from a 3-point loss to a 41-point loss.

=== Round 15 ===
	Round 15
Saturday 27 July (12:00 pm)	Collingwood 12.10 (82)	def. by	Casey 13.12 (90)	Victoria Park
Saturday 27 July (1:00 pm)	Essendon 21.19 (145)	def.	Bendigo 5.6 (36)	Windy Hill
Saturday 27 July (1:10 pm)	North Ballarat 12.12 (84)	def.	Werribee 9.13 (67)	Eureka Stadium
Saturday 27 July (2:00 pm)	Port Melbourne 15.10 (100)	def. by	Box Hill 17.13 (115)	Box Hill City Oval (crowd: 1,040)
Saturday 27 July (2:00 pm)	Williamstown 14.20 (104)	def.	Frankston 10.8 (68)	Burbank Oval
Sunday 28 July (1:00 pm)	Northern Blues 17.16 (118)	def.	Coburg 9.6 (60)	Preston City Oval
Sunday 28 July (2:00 pm)	Sandringham 9.9 (63)	def. by	Geelong 27.18 (180)	Trevor Barker Beach Oval

=== Round 16 ===
	Round 16
Saturday 30 Mar (1:10 pm)	Port Melbourne 12.15 (87)	def. by	Werribee 25.9 (159)	Avalon Airport Oval
Saturday 3 August (1:10 pm)	Sandringham 9.11 (65)	def. by	Essendon 16.12 (108)	Trevor Barker Beach Oval
Saturday 3 August (2:30 pm)	Box Hill 11.18 (84)	def.	Bendigo 7.5 (47)	Box Hill City Oval (crowd: 453)
Sunday 4 August (1:00 pm)	Collingwood 10.4 (64)	def. by	Williamstown 14.15 (99)	Victoria Park
Sunday 4 August (2:00 pm)	Casey 8.11 (59)	def. by	Geelong 19.11 (125)	Casey Fields
Sunday 4 August (2:00 pm)	Frankston 16.8 (104)	def.	Northern Blues 13.13 (91)	Frankston Park
Sunday 4 August (2:00 pm)	Coburg 15.11 (101)	def.	North Ballarat 13.7 (85)	Mantello Holden Oval

=== Round 17 ===
	Round 17
Saturday 10 August (1:00 pm)	Northern Blues 13.16 (94)	def.	Sandringham 11.10 (76)	Visy Park
Saturday 10 August (1:10 pm)	Box Hill 15.21 (111)	def.	Essendon 5.9 (39)	Box Hill City Oval (crowd: 1,622)
Saturday 10 August (2:00 pm)	Bendigo 12.8 (80)	def. by	Coburg 23.16 (154)	Queen Elizabeth Oval
Sunday 11 August (2:00 pm)	Werribee 20.16 (136)	def.	Port Melbourne 10.11 (71)	Avalon Airport Oval
Sunday 11 August (2:00 pm)	Williamstown 13.8 (86)	def. by	Geelong 19.21 (135)	Burbank Oval
Sunday 11 August (2:00 pm)	North Ballarat 14.12 (96)	def.	Collingwood 13.13 (91)	Eureka Stadium
Sunday 11 August (2:00 pm)	Frankston 10.6 (66)	def. by	Casey 14.13 (97)	Frankston Park

=== Round 18 ===
	Round 18
Saturday 17 August (1:00 pm)	Essendon 18.15 (123)	def.	Frankston 9.10 (64)	Windy Hill
Saturday 17 August (1:10 pm)	Port Melbourne 14.12 (96)	def. by	Geelong 15.12 (102)	North Port Oval
Saturday 17 August (2:00 pm)	Casey 23.11 (149)	def.	Bendigo 2.8 (20)	Casey Fields
Saturday 17 August (2:00 pm)	Sandringham 10.9 (69)	def. by	Collingwood 18.21 (129)	Trevor Barker Beach Oval
Sunday 18 August (2:00 pm)	North Ballarat 8.5 (53)	def. by	Williamstown 10.12 (72)	Eureka Stadium
Sunday 18 August (2:00 pm)	Coburg 5.18 (48)	def. by	Box Hill 20.14 (134)	Mantello Holden Oval
Sunday 18 August (2:00 pm)	Northern Blues 10.10 (70)	def. by	Werribee 17.16 (118)	Visy Park

=== Round 19 ===
	Round 19
Friday 23 August (6:30 pm)	Bendigo 3.8 (26)	def. by	Geelong 35.17 (227)	Queen Elizabeth Oval (crowd: 2,000)
Saturday 24 August (11:00 am)	Collingwood 15.8 (98)	def.	Werribee 13.13 (91)	Victoria Park
Saturday 24 August (1:00 pm)	Essendon 18.17 (125)	def.	North Ballarat 13.8 (86)	Windy Hill
Saturday 24 August (1:10 pm)	Williamstown 17.9 (111)	def.	Northern Blues 11.15 (81)	Burbank Oval
Saturday 24 August (2:00 pm)	Box Hill 10.12 (72)	def.	Casey 9.16 (70)	Box Hill City Oval (crowd: 881)
Saturday 24 August (2:00 pm)	Sandringham 19.14 (128)	def.	Frankston 17.11 (113)	Trevor Barker Beach Oval
Sunday 25 August (2:00 pm)	Coburg 10.13 (73)	def. by	Port Melbourne 15.11 (101)	Mantello Holden Oval
Geelong's score of 35.17 (227) and winning margin of 201 points against Bendigo set the record as the highest since the VFA became the VFL in 1996.

== Ladder ==
Pos	Team	Pld	W	L	D	PF	PA	PP	Pts	Qualification
1	Geelong	18	16	2	0	2273	1363	166.8	64	Finals series
2	Box Hill (P)	18	13	5	0	1815	1326	136.9	52	Finals series
3	Williamstown	18	12	6	0	1809	1394	129.8	48	Finals series
4	Casey	18	12	6	0	1830	1434	127.6	48	Finals series
5	Werribee	18	10	8	0	1897	1661	114.2	40	Finals series
6	Collingwood	18	10	8	0	1766	1667	105.9	40	Finals series
7	Port Melbourne	18	9	8	1	1726	1704	101.3	38	Finals series
8	Essendon	18	9	9	0	1765	1590	111.0	36	Finals series
9	Northern Blues	18	8	10	0	1709	1622	105.4	32	
10	North Ballarat	18	8	10	0	1556	1558	99.9	32	
11	Sandringham	18	6	11	1	1705	1992	85.6	26	
12	Frankston	18	6	12	0	1522	1885	80.7	24	
13	Coburg	18	6	12	0	1533	1973	77.7	24	
14	Bendigo	18	0	18	0	912	2649	34.4	0	

Source: Ladder for 2013 Peter Jackson VFL
Rules for classification: 1) points; 2) percentage; 3) number of points for.
(P) Premiers

== Finals series ==
=== Qualifying and Elimination Finals ===
	Qualifying Finals
Friday 30 August (7:00 pm)	Geelong 14.16 (100)	def.	Casey 8.3 (51)	Simonds Stadium (crowd: 6,000)
Saturday 31 August (2:00 pm)	Box Hill 13.8 (86)	def.	Williamstown 7.14 (56)	Box Hill City Oval (crowd: 1,975)

	Elimination Finals
Saturday 31 August (2:10 pm)	Collingwood 12.8 (80)	def. by	Port Melbourne 16.9 (105)	North Port Oval
Sunday 1 September (2:10 pm)	Werribee 17.14 (116)	def.	Essendon 15.7 (97)	North Port Oval

=== Semi-finals ===
	Semi-finals
Saturday, 7 September (2:10 pm)	Williamstown 27.14 (176)	def.	Port Melbourne 14.5 (89)	North Port Oval
Sunday, 8 September (2:10 pm)	Casey 12.12 (84)	def. by	Werribee 19.10 (124)	North Port Oval

=== Preliminary Finals ===
	Preliminary Finals
Saturday, 14 September (2:10 pm)	Geelong 24.16 (160)	def.	Williamstown 11.12 (78)	North Port Oval
Sunday, 15 September (2:10 pm)	Box Hill 22.12 (144)	def.	Werribee 14.8 (92)	North Port Oval

=== Grand Final ===
2013 VFL Grand Final
Sunday, 22 September (2:15 pm)	Geelong	def. by	Box Hill	Etihad Stadium (crowd: 15,100)
4.3 (27); 7.6 (48); 7.7 (49); 11.12 (78)	Q1; Q2; Q3; Final	7.2 (44); 9.4 (58); 12.10 (82); 14.15 (99)	Norm Goss Memorial Medal: Jonathan Simpkin (Box Hill); Television broadcast: ABC1

== Awards ==
- The J. J. Liston Trophy was won by Mitch Hallahan (Box Hill), Jordan Schroder (Geelong) and Steve Clifton (North Ballarat), who all polled 17 votes. It was Clifton's second Liston Trophy.
- The Frosty Miller Medal was won by Dean Galea (Port Melbourne), who kicked 55 goals during the home-and-away season. Michael Lourey (Frankston) officially finished second with 54 goals; he actually kicked 55 goals, the same number as Galea, but one was annulled as a result of the headcount in Round 14. Including finals, the leading goalkicker for the season was Ben Warren (Werribee), who finished with 59 goals, one goal more than Galea.
- The Fothergill–Round Medal was won by Kane Lambert (Northern Blues), who averaged 26 possessions a game and kicked 21 goals in season 2013.
- The top two non-AFL clubs – Box Hill and Williamstown – qualified for the 2014 Foxtel Cup tournament.
- The Development League premiership was won by Williamstown. In the Grand Final, played at North Port Oval on 14 September, Williamstown 11.19 (85) defeated Box Hill 12.12 (84) by one point; scores were level at 84 apiece when time expired, and Williamstown scored the winning behind after seven minutes of golden point extra time.

2013 VFL Team of the Year
B:	David Mirra (Box Hill)	Evan Panozza (Casey)	Matt Sully (Geelong)
HB:	Sam Iles (Box Hill)	Sam Pleming (Port Melbourne)	Ben Jolley (Williamstown)
C:	Kane Lambert (Northern Blues)	Chris Cain (Port Melbourne)	Ben Raidme (Geelong)
HF:	Mark Corrigan (Geelong)	Scott Simpson (Frankston)	Lachlan George (North Ballarat)
F:	Sam Lloyd (Frankston)	Michael Lourey (Frankston)	Josh Scipione (Frankston)
Foll:	Russell Gabriel (Frankston)	John Baird (Port Melbourne) (capt)	Troy Selwood (Geelong)
Int:	Jarred Moore (Werribee)	Scott Sherlock (Werribee)	Steve Clifton (North Ballarat)
Int:	Ben Brown (Werribee)	Daniel Toman (Bendigo)	Jack Hellier (Collingwood)
Coach:	—		
