= 2015 VFL season =

134th season of the Victorian Football League

- Teams: 15
- Premiers: Williamstown; 14th premiership
- Minor premiers: Box Hill; 1st minor premiership
- J. J. Liston Trophy: Nick Rippon (North Ballarat)
- Leading goalkicker: Sam Grimley (Box Hill); Jordan Lisle (Port Melbourne); Liam McBean (Richmond) 42 goals each

The 2015 VFL season was the 134th season of the Victorian Football League, a second-tier Australian rules football competition played in the state of Victoria.

Fifteen teams competing in the league. The season commenced on Friday 17 April and concluded Sunday 27 September with the VFL Grand Final, won by Williamstown, who defeated Box Hill by 54 points at Etihad Stadium. It was Williamstown's 14th top division premiership.

== League membership ==
The size of the league reduced from sixteen teams to fifteen for the 2015 season, following the withdrawal and disbanding of the Bendigo Football Club. Bendigo had enjoyed stability from 2003 until 2012 in a reserves affiliation with the Australian Football League's Essendon, but following Essendon's establishment of a stand-alone reserves team in 2013, Bendigo had struggled to remain competitive as a stand-alone club. In June 2014, half-way through what would finish as its second consecutive winless season, the club concluded that it was not financially viable in the long term and announced it would play out the 2014 season before folding.

== Home-and-away season ==
Specific feature of the fixture included:

- A Grand Final replay between Footscray and Box Hill Hawks headlining the opening round of a twenty-round season.
- At least two AFL curtain raiser games to be played, with the Northern Blues to face North Ballarat in Round 5 and Frankston in Round 11 as curtain raisers to Carlton matches.
- Four night matches as a feature of the season.
- Two matches, each between two AFL reserves teams, will be played in Bendigo at Queen Elizabeth Oval.
- The Seven Network to broadcast one match of the round live in Victoria, midday or 11.30am each weekend.

Source: VFL season 2015 Results and Fixtures

=== Round 1 ===
	Round 1
Friday 17 April (7:30 pm)	Geelong 12.12 (84)	def.	Werribee 10.6 (66)	Simonds Stadium (crowd: 650)	Report
Saturday 18 April (12:00 pm)	Footscray 7.15 (57)	def. by	Box Hill 11.4 (70)	VU Whitten Oval (crowd: 3,000)	Report
Saturday 18 April (2:00 pm)	Coburg 15.10 (100)	def.	Richmond 12.13 (85)	Piranha Park	Report
Saturday 18 April (2:15 pm)	Northern Blues 12.17 (89)	def. by	Williamstown 13.12 (90)	Ikon Park	Report
Sunday 19 April (1:30 pm)	North Ballarat 11.14 (80)	def.	Collingwood 6.9 (45)	Eureka Stadium	Report
Sunday 19 April (2:00 pm)	Casey 13.21 (99)	def.	Frankston 5.9 (39)	Casey Fields	Report
Sunday 19 April (1:00 pm)	Sandringham 12.11 (83)	def.	Essendon 12.10 (82)	Trevor Barker Beach Oval	Report
	Bye; Port Melbourne

=== Round 2 ===
	Round 2
Saturday 25 April (12:00 pm)	Werribee 11.12 (78)	def.	North Ballarat 9.10 (64)	Avalon Airport Oval	Report
Saturday 25 April (2:00 pm)	Frankston 7.7 (49)	def. by	Richmond 15.12 (102)	Frankston Park	Report
Saturday 25 April (2:00 pm)	Port Melbourne 15.14 (104)	def.	Northern Blues 11.15 (81)	North Port Oval	Report
Sunday 26 April (11:30 am)	Essendon 11.9 (75)	def.	Collingwood 5.13 (43)	Windy Hill	Report
Sunday 26 April (12:00 pm)	Footscray 15.7 (97)	def.	Casey 10.13 (73)	VU Whitten Oval	Report
Sunday 26 April (2:00 pm)	Box Hill 14.7 (91)	def.	Coburg 10.11 (71)	Box Hill City Oval (crowd: 1,117)	Report
Sunday 26 April (2:00 pm)	Williamstown 17.12 (114)	def.	Sandringham 7.14 (56)	Burbank Oval	Report
	Bye; Geelong

=== Round 3 ===
	Round 3
Saturday 2 May (11:00 am)	Richmond 15.11 (101)	def. by	Geelong 16.13 (109)	ME Bank Centre	Report
Saturday 2 May (12:00 pm)	Coburg 14.7 (91)	def.	Frankston 10.11 (71)	Piranha Park	Report
Saturday 2 May (1:00 pm)	Collingwood 16.4 (100)	def.	Footscray 14.12 (96)	Victoria Park	Report
Saturday 2 May (1:00 pm)	North Ballarat 5.10 (40)	def. by	Williamstown 17.19 (121)	Eureka Stadium	Report
Saturday 2 May (2:00 pm)	Port Melbourne 12.16 (88)	def. by	Werribee 15.10 (100)	North Port Oval	Report
Sunday 3 May (12:00 pm)	Essendon 10.14 (74)	def. by	Casey 16.11 (107)	Windy Hill	Report
Sunday 3 May (2:00 pm)	Sandringham 12.18 (90)	def. by	Northern Blues 14.12 (96)	Trevor Barker Beach Oval	Report
	Bye; Box Hill

=== Round 4 ===
	Round 4
Saturday 9 May (11:00 am)	Richmond 19.15 (129)	def.	North Ballarat 6.11 (47)	ME Bank Centre	Report
Saturday 9 May (12:12 pm)	Casey 8.10 (58)	def. by	Sandringham 13.15 (93)	Casey Fields	Report
Saturday 9 May (6:00 pm)	Geelong 12.11 (83)	def. by	Collingwood 14.8 (92)	Queen Elizabeth Oval	Report
Sunday 10 May (2:00 pm)	Box Hill 6.15 (51)	def. by	Werribee 8.8 (56)	Box Hill City Oval (crowd: 764)	Report
Sunday 10 May (2:00 pm)	Coburg 6.12 (48)	def. by	Essendon 10.14 (74)	Piranha Park	Report
Sunday 10 May (2:00 pm)	Frankston 9.8 (62)	def. by	Northern Blues 11.14 (80)	Frankston Park	Report
Sunday 10 May (2:00 pm)	Williamstown 14.16 (100)	def. by	Port Melbourne 16.6 (102)	Burbank Oval	Report
	Bye; Footscray

=== Round 5 ===
	Round 5
Saturday 16 May (11:00 am)	Northern Blues 11.7 (73)	def. by	North Ballarat 14.10 (94)	Etihad Stadium	Report
Saturday 16 May (12:00 pm)	Essendon 14.11 (95)	def. by	Box Hill 18.10 (118)	Windy Hill	Report
Saturday 16 May (2:00 pm)	Footscray 17.13 (115)	def.	Geelong 8.5 (53)	VU Whitten Oval	Report
Saturday 16 May (2:00 pm)	Port Melbourne 10.15 (75)	def.	Casey 7.10 (52)	North Port Oval	Report
Sunday 17 May (11:42 am)	Richmond 14.8 (92)	def. by	Collingwood 14.11 (95)	ME Bank Centre	Report
Sunday 17 May (2:00 pm)	Frankston 9.7 (61)	def. by	Sandringham 21.10 (136)	Frankston Park	Report
Sunday 17 May (2:00 pm)	Werribee 14.12 (96)	def.	Williamstown 14.10 (94)	Avalon Airport Oval	Report
	Bye; Coburg

=== Round 6 ===
	Round 6
Saturday 23 May (12:00 pm)	Geelong 13.20 (98)	def. by	Port Melbourne 15.13 (103)	Simonds Stadium	Report
Saturday 23 May (2:00 pm)	Northern Blues 9.14 (68)	def. by	Essendon 11.10 (76)	Preston City Oval	Report
Saturday 23 May (6:00 pm)	Casey 15.13 (103)	def.	Richmond 8.11 (59)	Casey Fields	Report
Sunday 24 May (11:00 am)	Footscray 27.17 (179)	def.	North Ballarat 5.3 (33)	VU Whitten Oval	Report
Sunday 24 May (2:00 pm)	Sandringham 11.12 (78)	def. by	Box Hill 14.17 (101)	Trevor Barker Beach Oval	Report
Sunday 24 May (2:00 pm)	Werribee 22.18 (150)	def.	Frankston 10.13 (73)	Avalon Airport Oval	Report
Sunday 24 May (2:00 pm)	Williamstown 17.20 (122)	def.	Coburg 6.8 (44)	Burbank Oval	Report
	Bye; Collingwood

=== Round 7 ===
	Round 7
Saturday 30 May (12:00 pm)	Geelong 12.8 (80)	def. by	Williamstown 11.16 (82)	Simonds Stadium	Report
Saturday 30 May (2:00 pm)	Coburg 11.17 (83)	def. by	Collingwood 18.13 (121)	Piranha Park	Report
Saturday 30 May (2:00 pm)	Port Melbourne 22.21 (153)	def.	North Ballarat 11.7 (73)	North Port Oval	Report
Saturday 30 May (2:00 pm)	Richmond 8.11 (59)	def. by	Essendon 15.13 (103)	ME Bank Centre	Report
Saturday 30 May (2:00 pm)	Sandringham 15.11 (101)	def.	Werribee 8.13 (61)	Trevor Barker Beach Oval	Report
Sunday 31 May (2:00 pm)	Box Hill 15.6 (96)	def.	Northern Blues 10.8 (68)	Box Hill City Oval (crowd: 1,323)	Report
Sunday 31 May (2:00 pm)	Frankston 12.5 (77)	def. by	Footscray 21.17 (143)	Frankston Park	Report
	Bye; Casey

=== Round 8 ===
	Round 8
Saturday 6 June (1:00 pm)	North Ballarat 8.6 (54)	def. by	Sandringham 11.15 (81)	Eureka Stadium
Saturday 6 June (2:00 pm)	Werribee 19.19 (133)	def.	Richmond 5.7 (37)	Avalon Airport Oval
Saturday 6 June (2:00 pm)	Box Hill 17.13 (115)	def.	Port Melbourne 8.12 (60)	Box Hill City Oval (crowd: 1,664)
Saturday 6 June (2:00 pm)	Casey 10.12 (72)	def.	Collingwood 9.14 (68)	Casey Fields
Saturday 6 June (3:25 pm)	Essendon 19.21 (135)	def.	Geelong 6.7 (43)	Etihad Stadium
Sunday 7 June (2:00 pm)	Footscray 5.7 (37)	def. by	Williamstown 9.22 (76)	VU Whitten Oval
Monday 8 June (2:00 pm)	Coburg 10.5 (65)	def.	Northern Blues 9.9 (63)	Piranha Park
	Bye; Frankston

=== Round 9 ===
	Round 9
Saturday 13 June (12:00 pm)	Essendon 24.6 (150)	def.	Frankston 8.8 (56)	Windy Hill
Saturday 13 June (12:00 pm)	Geelong 15.12 (102)	def.	North Ballarat 14.9 (93)	Kardinnia Park
Saturday 13 June (2:00 pm)	Casey 14.13 (97)	def.	Coburg 14.5 (89)	Casey Fields
Saturday 13 June (2:00 pm)	Port Melbourne 16.7 (103)	def. by	Sandringham 16.14 (110)	North Port Oval
Sunday 14 June (11:00 am)	Collingwood 18.13 (121)	def.	Werribee 12.7 (79)	Victoria Park
	Bye; Box Hill, Northern Blues, Williamstown, Footscray, Richmond

=== Round 10 ===
	Round 10
Saturday 20 June (12:00 pm)	Richmond 12.10 (82)	def. by	Footscray 11.18 (84)	ME Bank Centre
Saturday 20 June (1:00 pm)	North Ballarat 10.2 (62)	def.	Casey 5.10 (40)	Eureka Stadium
Saturday 20 June (2:00 pm)	Coburg 7.12 (54)	def. by	Geelong 12.12 (84)	Piranha Park
Saturday 20 June (2:15 pm)	Northern Blues 16.10 (106)	def.	Werribee 15.12 (102)	Ikon Park
Sunday 21 June (2:00 pm)	Frankston 12.8 (80)	def. by	Port Melbourne 18.3 (111)	Frankston Park
Sunday 21 June (2:00 pm)	Williamstown 8.12 (60)	def. by	Box Hill 19.8 (122)	Burbank Oval
	Bye; Sandringham, Collingwood, Essendon

=== Round 11 ===
	Round 11
Saturday 27 June (12:00 pm)	Richmond 10.7 (67)	def. by	Williamstown 14.23 (107)	ME Bank Centre
Saturday 27 June (1:00 pm)	Collingwood 9.8 (62)	def.	Box Hill 9.6 (60)	Victoria Park
Saturday 27 June (2:00 pm)	Port Melbourne 11.9 (75)	def. by	Essendon 12.14 (86)	North Port Oval
Sunday 28 June (11:00 am)	Northern Blues 29.9 (183)	def.	Frankston 3.8 (26)	Etihad Stadium
Sunday 28 June (2:00 pm)	Sandringham 15.11 (101)	def.	Footscray 15.8 (98)	Trevor Barker Beach Oval
	Bye; Casey, Coburg, North Ballarat, Werribee, Geelong

=== Round 12 ===
	Round 12
Saturday 4 July (1:00 pm)	Williamstown 20.8 (128)	def.	Essendon 13.6 (84)	Burbank Oval
Saturday 4 July (1:00 pm)	Collingwood 11.12 (78)	def.	Sandringham 10.8 (68)	Victoria Park
Saturday 4 July (2:00 pm)	Box Hill 15.12 (102)	def.	Frankston 5.7 (37)	Box Hill City Oval (crowd: 851)
Saturday 4 July (2:00 pm)	Casey 14.9 (93)	def.	Geelong 6.9 (45)	Casey Fields
Saturday 4 July (2:00 pm)	Footscray 21.15 (141)	def.	Northern Blues 5.8 (38)	VU Whitten Oval
Sunday 5 July (1:30 pm)	North Ballarat 6.7 (43)	def. by	Richmond 11.9 (75)	Eureka Stadium
Sunday 5 July (2:00 pm)	Werribee 15.18 (108)	def.	Coburg 7.8 (50)	Avalon Airport Oval
	Bye; Port Melbourne

=== Round 13 ===
	Round 13
Saturday 11 July (12:00 pm)	Werribee 7.9 (51)	def. by	Geelong 7.11 (53)	Chirnside Park
Saturday 11 July (1:00 pm)	Box Hill 12.11 (83)	def.	North Ballarat 11.12 (78)	Box Hill City Oval (crowd: 664)
Saturday 11 July (1:00 pm)	Footscray 21.12 (138)	def.	Collingwood 10.10 (70)	VU Whitten Oval
Saturday 11 July (2:00 pm)	Northern Blues 5.9 (39)	def. by	Richmond 9.9 (63)	Preston City Oval
Saturday 11 July (2:00 pm)	Williamstown 21.21 (147)	def.	Frankston 6.4 (40)	Burbank Oval
Sunday 12 July (2:00 pm)	Casey 10.9 (69)	def.	Port Melbourne 2.8 (20)	Casey Fields
Sunday 12 July (2:00 pm)	Sandringham 9.19 (73)	def.	Coburg 8.10 (58)	Trevor Barker Beach Oval
	Bye; Essendon

=== Round 14 ===
	Round 14
Saturday 18 July (12:00 pm)	Essendon 15.5 (95)	def.	North Ballarat 11.7 (73)	Windy Hill
Saturday 18 July (2:00 pm)	Northern Blues 9.4 (58)	def. by	Casey 15.15 (105)	Ikon Park
Saturday 18 July (2:00 pm)	Werribee 11.9 (75)	def. by	Sandringham 12.15 (87)	Avalon Airport Oval
Sunday 19 July (11:30 am)	Geelong 10.9 (69)	def. by	Footscray 15.5 (95)	Simonds Stadium
Sunday 19 July (1:00 pm)	Richmond 14.11 (95)	def.	Port Melbourne 13.9 (87)	ME Bank Centre
Sunday 19 July (2:00 pm)	Coburg 8.13 (61)	def. by	Box Hill 26.5 (161)	Piranha Park
Sunday 19 July (2:00 pm)	Frankston 13.4 (82)	def. by	Collingwood 19.9 (123)	Frankston Park
	Bye; Williamstown

=== Round 15 ===
	Round 15
Saturday 25 July (11:00 am)	Geelong 13.8 (86)	def. by	Essendon 15.9 (99)	Simonds Stadium
Saturday 25 July (1:30 pm)	Richmond 8.9 (57)	def. by	Sandringham 15.12 (102)	ME Bank Centre
Saturday 25 July (2:00 pm)	Coburg 15.13 (103)	def.	Footscray 7.13 (55)	Piranha Park
Saturday 25 July (2:00 pm)	North Ballarat 19.11 (125)	def.	Frankston 3.4 (22)	Eureka Stadium
Saturday 25 July (12:12 pm)	Port Melbourne 7.11 (53)	def. by	Williamstown 17.11 (113)	North Port Oval
Sunday 26 July (12:00 pm)	Collingwood 12.11 (83)	def.	Casey 9.6 (60)	Victoria Park
Sunday 26 July (2:00 pm)	Werribee 9.12 (66)	def.	Box Hill 7.11 (53)	Avalon Airport Oval
	Bye; Northern Blues

=== Round 16 ===
	Round 16
Saturday 1 August (2:00 pm)	Box Hill 15.7 (97)	def.	Richmond 8.10 (58)	Box Hill City Oval (crowd: 1,521)
Saturday 1 August (2:00 pm)	Port Melbourne 7.7 (49)	def. by	Coburg 12.12 (84)	North Port Oval
Sunday 2 August (11:42 am)	Footscray 11.10 (76)	def.	Essendon 7.12 (54)	VU Whitten Oval
Sunday 2 August (1:30 pm)	North Ballarat 20.17 (137)	def.	Northern Blues 2.13 (25)	Eureka Stadium
Sunday 2 August (2:00 pm)	Casey 10.9 (69)	def. by	Werribee 12.10 (82)	Casey Fields
Sunday 2 August (2:00 pm)	Frankston 6.9 (45)	def. by	Geelong 16.20 (106)	Frankston Park
Sunday 2 August (2:00 pm)	Williamstown 14.13 (97)	def.	Collingwood 9.11 (65)	Burbank Oval
	Bye; Sandringham

=== Round 17 ===
	Round 17
Saturday 8 August (10:16 am)	Collingwood 21.10 (136)	def.	Northern Blues 10.8 (68)	MCG
Sunday 9 August (12:00 pm)	Essendon 11.9 (75)	def. by	Werribee 15.13 (103)	Windy Hill
Sunday 9 August (1:30 pm)	North Ballarat 11.10 (76)	def.	Geelong 4.5 (29)	Eureka Stadium
Sunday 9 August (2:00 pm)	Sandringham 19.6 (120)	def.	Port Melbourne 12.15 (87)	Trevor Barker Beach Oval
Sunday 9 August (2:00 pm)	Box Hill 18.15 (123)	def.	Casey 7.7 (49)	Box Hill City Oval (crowd: 1,593)
Sunday 9 August (2:00 pm)	Frankston 10.7 (67)	def. by	Coburg 11.9 (75)	Frankston Park
Sunday 9 August (2:00 pm)	Williamstown 8.14 (62)	def. by	Footscray 10.13 (73)	Burbank Oval
	Bye; Richmond

=== Round 18 ===
	Round 18
Saturday 15 August (11:00 am)	Geelong 10.11 (71)	def. by	Box Hill 19.7 (121)	Simonds Stadium
Saturday 15 August (12:12 pm)	Footscray 12.12 (84)	def.	Port Melbourne 12.9 (81)	VU Whitten Oval
Saturday 15 August (1:00 pm)	Collingwood 17.7 (109)	def. by	North Ballarat 17.15 (117)	Victoria Park
Saturday 15 August (2:00 pm)	Casey 12.7 (79)	def. by	Williamstown 14.12 (96)	Casey Fields
Sunday 16 August (10:30 am)	Richmond 5.4 (34)	def. by	Coburg 11.11 (77)	ME Bank Centre
Sunday 16 August (2:00 pm)	Frankston 7.9 (51)	def. by	Essendon 25.14 (164)	Frankston Park
Sunday 16 August (2:00 pm)	Northern Blues 9.9 (63)	def. by	Sandringham 16.12 (108)	Ikon Park
	Bye; Werribee

=== Round 19 ===
	Round 19
Friday 21 August (7:30 pm)	Essendon 11.13 (79)	def.	Footscray 10.15 (75)	Queen Elizabeth Oval
Saturday 22 August (10:30 am)	Collingwood 22.18 (150)	def.	Richmond 12.6 (78)	Victoria Park
Saturday 22 August (2:00 pm)	Coburg 14.10 (94)	def. by	Casey 17.9 (111)	Piranha Park
Saturday 22 August (2:00 pm)	Northern Blues 11.9 (75)	def. by	Box Hill 26.9 (165)	Preston City Oval
Saturday 22 August (2:00 pm)	Port Melbourne 33.13 (211)	def.	Frankston 10.5 (65)	North Port Oval
Saturday 22 August (2:00 pm)	Williamstown 11.7 (73)	def. by	Werribee 11.22 (88)	Burbank Oval
Sunday 23 August (2:00 pm)	Sandringham 14.17 (101)	def.	Geelong 11.7 (73)	Trevor Barker Beach Oval
	Bye; North Ballarat

=== Round 20 ===
	Round 20
Saturday 29 August (1:00 pm)	Geelong 19.13 (127)	def.	Northern Blues 6.10 (46)	Simonds Stadium
Saturday 29 August (1:00 pm)	Collingwood 10.12 (72)	def.	Port Melbourne 9.10 (64)	Victoria Park
Saturday 29 August (1:00 pm)	Essendon 12.8 (80)	def.	Richmond 9.9 (63)	Windy Hill
Saturday 29 August (2:00 pm)	North Ballarat 14.10 (94)	def.	Coburg 7.10 (52)	Eureka Stadium
Saturday 29 August (2:00 pm)	Sandringham 12.17 (89)	def.	Casey 5.8 (38)	Trevor Barker Beach Oval
Sunday 30 August (11:42 am)	Werribee 8.13 (61)	def. by	Footscray 9.11 (65)	Avalon Airport Oval
Sunday 30 August (2:00 pm)	Box Hill 10.8 (68)	def. by	Williamstown 11.16 (82)	Box Hill City Oval (crowd: 1,684)
	Bye; Frankston

== Ladder ==
2015 VFL ladder
Pos	Team	Pld	W	L	D	PF	PA	PP	Pts	
1	Box Hill Hawks	18	14	4	0	1797	1184	151.8	56	Finals series
2	Sandringham	18	14	4	0	1678	1357	123.7	56	Finals series
3	Williamstown (P)	18	13	5	0	1764	1283	137.5	52	Finals series
4	Footscray	18	12	6	0	1708	1282	133.2	48	Finals series
5	Essendon	18	12	6	0	1680	1355	124.0	48	Finals series
6	Collingwood	18	12	6	0	1633	1491	109.5	48	Finals series
7	Werribee	18	11	7	0	1555	1345	115.6	44	Finals series
8	Casey Scorpions	18	9	9	0	1382	1352	102.2	36	Finals series
9	North Ballarat	18	8	10	0	1389	1499	92.7	32	
10	Port Melbourne	18	7	11	0	1626	1597	101.8	28	
11	Geelong	18	7	11	0	1405	1568	89.6	28	
12	Coburg	18	7	11	0	1299	1565	83.0	28	
13	Richmond	18	5	13	0	1336	1605	83.2	20	
14	Northern Blues	18	4	14	0	1319	1787	73.8	16	
15	Frankston	18	0	18	0	1008	2309	43.7	0	

Source: Ladder for 2015 Peter Jackson VFL
Rules for classification: 1) points; 2) percentage; 3) number of points for.
(P) Premiers

== Finals series ==
Qualifying and elimination finals
5 Sep, Box Hill City Oval
1	Box Hill	18.12 (120)
4	Footscray	12.8 (80)
6 Sep, North Port Oval
5	Essendon	10.11 (71)
8	Casey	7.8 (50)
5 Sep, North Port Oval
6	Collingwood	13.15 (93)
7	Werribee	9.10 (64)
6 Sep, Trevor Barker Beach Oval
2	Sandringham	11.11 (77)
3	Williamstown	13.6 (84)

Semi-finals
12 Sep, North Port Oval
Footscray	8.9 (57)
Essendon	19.9 (123)
13 Sep, North Port Oval
Sandringham	15.14 (104)
Collingwood	14.13 (97)

Preliminary finals
19 Sep, North Port Oval
Box Hill	12.17 (89)
Sandringham	12.10 (82)
20 Sep, North Port Oval
Williamstown	15.12 (102)
Essendon	12.18 (90)

Grand final
27 Sep, Etihad Stadium
Box Hill	8.18 (66)
Williamstown	18.12 (120)

=== Qualifying and Elimination Finals ===
	Qualifying Finals
Saturday 5 September (2:00 pm)	Box Hill 18.12 (120)	def.	Footscray 12.8 (80)	Box Hill City Oval (crowd: 1,640)	Report
Sunday 6 September (2:00 pm)	Sandringham 11.11 (77)	def. by	Williamstown 13.6 (84)	Trevor Barker Oval	Report

	Elimination Finals
Saturday 5 September (12:10 pm)	Collingwood 13.15 (93)	def.	Werribee 9.10 (64)	North Port Oval	Report
Sunday 6 September (11:40 am)	Essendon 10.11 (71)	def.	Casey 7.8 (50)	North Port Oval	Report

=== Semi-finals ===
	Semi-finals
Saturday 12 September (11:40am)	Footscray 8.9 (57)	def. by	Essendon 19.9 (123)	North Port Oval	Report
Sunday 13 September (11:40am)	Sandringham 15.14 (104)	def.	Collingwood 14.13 (97)	North Port Oval	Report

=== Preliminary Finals ===
	Preliminary Finals
Saturday 19 September (2:40 pm)	Box Hill 12.17 (89)	def.	Sandringham 12.10 (82)	North Port Oval	Report
Sunday 20 September (2:40 pm)	Williamstown 15.12 (102)	def.	Essendon 12.18 (90)	North Port Oval	Report

=== Grand Final ===
2015 VFL Grand Final
Sunday 27 September (3:00 pm)	Box Hill	def. by	Williamstown	Etihad Stadium (crowd: 12,900)	Report
2.3 (15); 6.8 (44); 7.14 (56); 8.18 (66)	Q1; Q2; Q3; Final	5.5 (35); 7.7 (49); 12.10 (82); 18.12 (120)	Umpires: Burgess, Butcher, Gavine; Norm Goss Memorial Medal: Michael Gibbons (Williamstown); Television broadcast: Seven Network
2: Anderson, Sicily; 1: Collins, Grimley, Miles, Simpkin	Goals	3: Lockwood, Conway, Gallucci; 2: Anastasio; 1: Banner, Carr, Clouston, Gibbons, Tighe
Simpkin, Langford, Whitecross, Sicily	Best	Gibbons, Banner, Jolley, Lockwood, Conway

== Awards ==
- The Frosty Miller Medal was won jointly by Sam Grimley (Box Hill), Jordan Lisle (Port Melbourne) and Liam McBean (Richmond), who each kicked 42 goals during the home-and-away season. It was Grimley's second consecutive joint Frosty Miller Medal, and the most players ever to tie for the award. Across the completed season including finals, Grimley was the leading goalkicker with 46.
- The J. J. Liston Trophy was won by Nick Rippon (North Ballarat), who polled 15 votes. Four players – Myles Sewell (North Ballarat), Clint Jones (Sandringham), Matt Thomas (Richmond) and Sam Dunell (Williamstown) – finished equal second with 14 votes.
- The Fothergill–Round Medal was won by Adam Marcon (Williamstown).
- The Development League premiership was won by Williamstown. In the Grand Final, played at North Port Oval on 19 September as a curtain-raiser to the senior first preliminary final, Williamstown 8.13 (61) defeated Box Hill 8.12 (60) by one point; scores were level at 60 apiece when time expired, and Williamstown scored the winning behind after three minutes of golden point extra time. It was the third consecutive year that Williamstown defeated Box Hill in the Development League Grand Final, and the second time out of those three years that the final margin was one golden point.

2015 VFL Team of the Year
B:	Peter Faulks (Williamstown)	Jake Wilson (Werribee)	David Mirra (Box Hill) (capt)
HB:	Jordan Russell (Footscray)	Michael Hartley (Coburg)	Ryan Pendelbury (Collingwood)
C:	Mitch Banner (Williamstown)	Clint Jones (Sandringham)	Nick Rippon (North Ballarat)
HF:	Sam Dunell (Williamstown)	Mitch Brown (Sandringham)	Isaac Conway (Werribee)
F:	Andrew Gallucci (Williamstown)	Jordan Lisle (Port Melbourne)	Kyle Hardingham (Essendon)
Foll:	Nick Meese (Williamstown)	Ben Jolley (Williamstown)	Ozgur Uysal (Coburg)
Int:	Luke Kiel (North Ballarat)	Myles Sewell (North Ballarat)	Adam Marcon (Williamstown)
Int:	Matt Hanson (Werribee)	Ben Moloney (Collingwood)	Andrew Hooper (North Ballarat)
Coach:	Paul Hudson (Sandringham)		

== Notable events ==
- After having televised VFA/VFL matches weekly since the 1987 finals series, the Australian Broadcasting Corporation ended its broadcasting arrangement with the VFL. A new broadcast deal covering the 2015 and 2016 seasons was signed with the Seven Network, which televised the match of the round live into Melbourne as a lead-in to its AFL coverage.

== See also ==
- List of VFA/VFL premiers
- Australian rules football
- Victorian Football League
- Australian Football League
- 2015 AFL season
