= Fothergill–Round–Mitchell Medal =

Australian rules football award

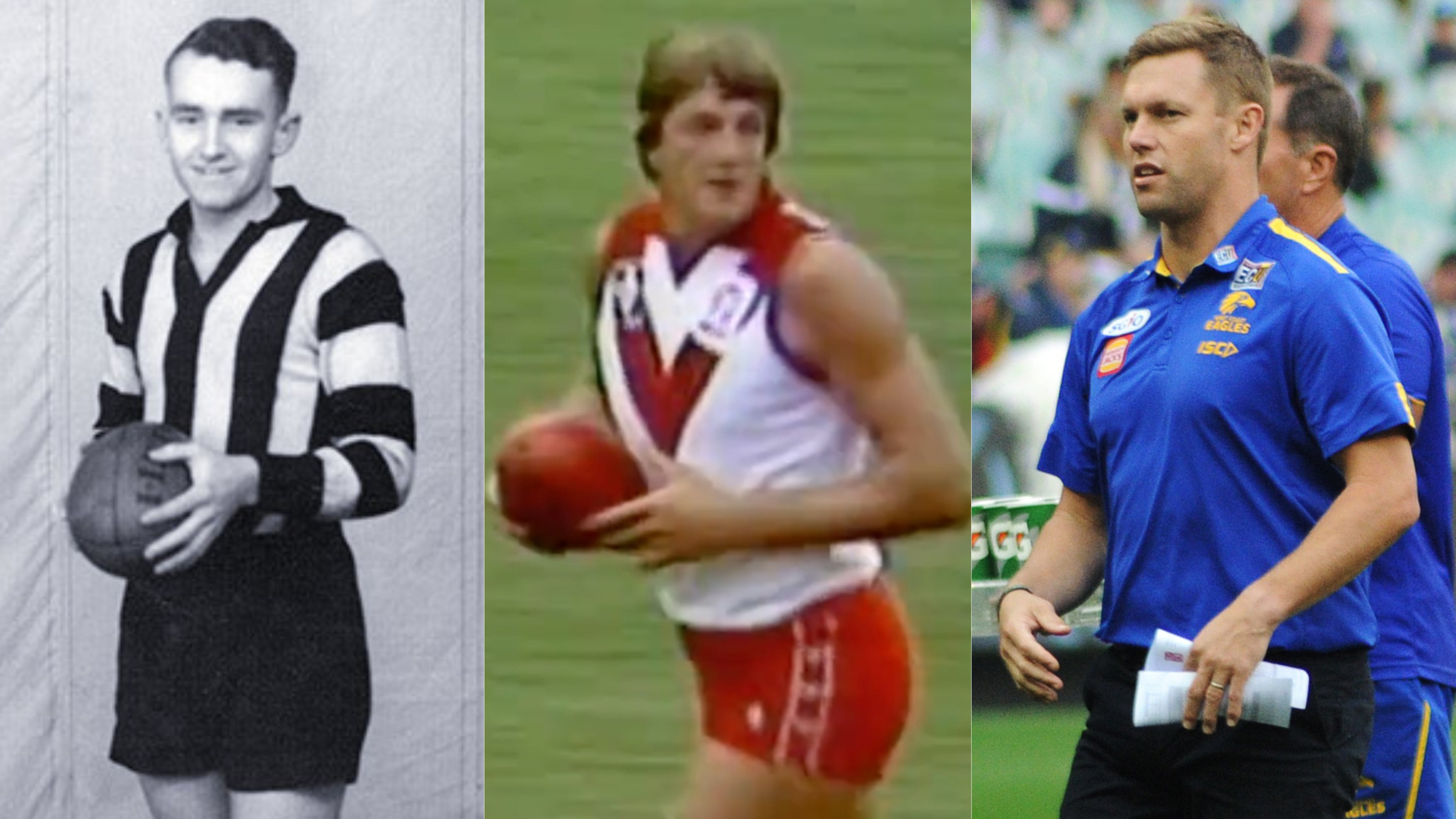
- L–R: Fothergill, Round, Mitchell
- League: Victorian Football League
- Awarded for: Most promising player aged 24 or under in the VFL

History
- Most recent: Brady Wright (Werribee)

The Fothergill–Round–Mitchell Medal is an Australian rules football award that is presented to the most promising young player in the Victorian Football League (VFL). The medal was introduced by the VFL – known as the Victorian Football Association (VFA) at the time – in 1989 and has since been awarded annually, excluding in 2020 when the season was cancelled due to the impact of the COVID-19 pandemic. Werribee's Brady Wright is the most recent recipient.

== History ==
The award was originally named the Fothergill–Round Medal after Des Fothergill and Barry Round, who were (at the time) the only two players to have won both the J. J. Liston Trophy (or one of its predecessors) as the VFA/VFL's best-and-fairest player and the Brownlow Medal as the VFL/AFL's best-and-fairest player. Fothergill jointly won the Brownlow Medal in 1940 while playing for Collingwood, before switching to the VFA in 1941 and claiming both the VFA Gold Medal and Recorder Cup in his sole season at Williamstown. Round was the joint 1981 Brownlow Medallist with South Melbourne and won the Liston Trophy with Williamstown in 1987.

In 2018, the award was renamed to the Fothergill–Round–Mitchell Medal to recognise Sam Mitchell, who was jointly awarded the 2012 Brownlow Medal after Jobe Watson was ruled ineligible in November 2016 due to his part in the Essendon Football Club supplements saga. Mitchell had won the Brownlow Medal with Hawthorn, having claimed the Liston Trophy in 2002 while playing for the club's reserves affiliate, the Box Hill Hawks.

Every winner of the Fothergill–Round–Mitchell Medal has been drafted to the Australian Football League (AFL) since Jason Davenport in 2006; six winners of the award were also drafted prior to 2006. Werribee has had six of its players win the award, more than any other VFL club.

== Criteria ==
When the Fothergill–Round Medal was introduced in 1989, it was presented to the player seen as the best young talent in the VFA. After the AFL reserves competition was merged into the VFL in 2000, it was presented to the young player most likely to be drafted to the AFL. The award is sometimes referred to as the "VFL Rising Star" as the competition's equivalent to the AFL Rising Star award.

Players are nominated for the Fothergill–Round–Mitchell Medal by their respective club at the end of the home-and-away season; multiple players can be nominated by the same club. To be eligible for the award, players must be aged 24 or under and cannot have previously been on an AFL club's list.

== Winners ==
Werribee's Brady Wright won the award in 2026

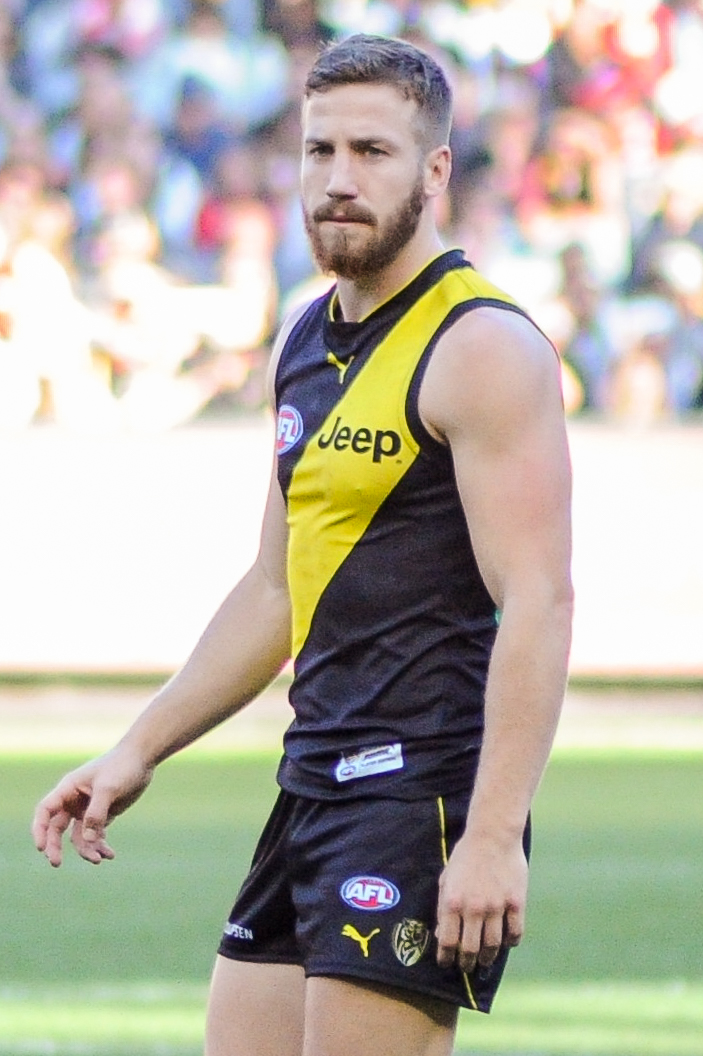
Future three-time AFL premiership player Kane Lambert won the award with the Northern Blues in 2013

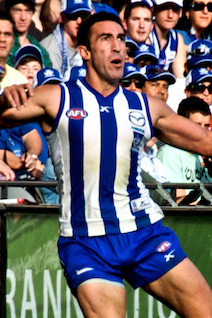
Michael Firrito played 275 AFL matches, the most of any Fothergill–Round–Mitchell Medal winner

Year	Player	Club	Ref
1989	Chris Owen	Preston	
1990	Mathew Quirk	Oakleigh	
1991	Ron De Iulio	Box Hill	
1992	Julian Shanks	Williamstown	
1993	Adam Williams	Sandringham	
1994	Bruce Cohen	Box Hill	
1995	Mark Porter	Coburg	
1996	Paul Dooley	Williamstown	
1997	James Puli	Werribee	
1998	Andrew Shipp	Springvale	
1999	Mark Passador	Springvale	
2000	Michael Swan	Port Melbourne	
2001	Kristian DePasquale	Coburg	
2002	Michael Firrito	Box Hill	
2003	Aaron Davey	Port Melbourne	
2004	Adam Fisher	Sandringham	
2005	Jackson Barling	Williamstown	
2006	Jason Davenport	Geelong	
2007	Shane Valenti	Sandringham	
2008	Robin Nahas	Port Melbourne	
2009	Michael Barlow	Werribee	
2010	Michael Hibberd	Frankston	
2011	Ahmed Saad	Northern Bullants	
2012	Dean Towers	North Ballarat	
2013	Kane Lambert	Northern Blues	
2014	Nic Newman	Frankston	
2015	Adam Marcon	Williamstown	
2016	Luke Ryan	Coburg	
2017	Bayley Fritsch	Casey	
2018	Josh Corbett	Werribee	
2019	Jake Riccardi	Werribee	
2020	Not awarded due to season cancelled		
2021	Charlie Dean	Williamstown	
2022	Ethan Phillips	Port Melbourne	
2023	Sam Clohesy	Werribee	
2024	Sam Davidson	Richmond	
2025	Tom Blamires	Frankston	
2026	Brady Wright	Werribee	
