= Jason Davenport =

Australian rules footballer

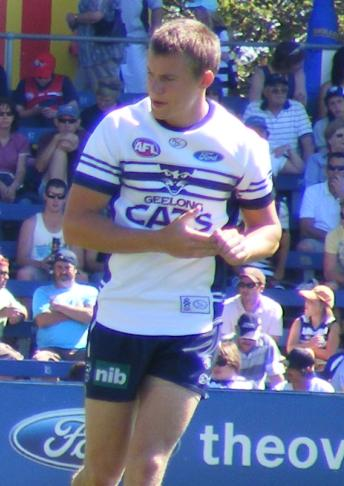
- Davenport training with Geelong in 2008

Personal information
- Full name: Jason Davenport
- Nickname: Eagle Killer
- Born: 4 September 1985 (age 41); Victoria, Australia
- Original team: Nilma Darnum (EDFL)/Geelong Football Club (VFL)
- Draft: No. 38, 2007 Rookie Draft, Geelong; No. 78, 2008 National Draft,Port Adelaide
- Height: 183 cm (6 ft 0 in)
- Weight: 80 kg (176 lb)
- Position: Midfielder, forward

Playing career^{1}
Years	Club	Games (Goals)
2007–2008	Geelong	0 (0)
2009–2011	Port Adelaide	28 (29)
- ^{1} Playing statistics correct to the end of 2011.

Career highlights
- VFL Premiership Player (2007); VFL Team of the Year (2007); 3rd Geelong VFL Best & Fairest (2007); Fothergill–Round–Mitchell Medal: 2006

Jason Davenport (born 4 September 1985) is a former Australian rules footballer who played for the Geelong Football Club and Port Adelaide Football Club in the Australian Football League (AFL).

== Career ==
A former basketballer and sprinter in his junior days, Davenport was a late-comer to football, but excelled in his early years of exposure to the game, commencing his career with the Ellinbank Eagles in the Ellinbank & District Football League, where he played alongside future Fox Sports pundit Sean Ormerod.

In 2005 he made his local leagues (Ellinbank & District Football League) team of the year, named on the wing after a stellar season with his home club Nilma Darnum where he won the club best and fairest. He then went on to playing as a top-up player for Geelong's VFL side in 2006, and he impressed with his dynamic game, where he has made his name as a goal-kicking wingman. He won the VFL's Fothergill–Round Medal as the league's best young talent, before being picked up with the Geelong's 38th pick in the 2007 Rookie Draft.

In 2007, he was named in the VFL's Team of the Year and came 3rd in the Geelong VFL best and fairest. After being part of Geelong's premiership winning VFL team, in October 2007 Davenport was elevated to the Cats' senior list for the 2008 AFL season. Steven King previously wore the number 1 guernsey for Geelong, and after being traded to St Kilda, King requested that Davenport wear the number 1 guernsey.

In 2008, Davenport won the VFL best and fairest at the Cats, but was delisted at the conclusion of the season after just one year on the senior list. He was later drafted by the Port Adelaide Football Club with pick #78 in the 2008 AFL draft. He was delisted by Port Adelaide at the end of the 2011 AFL season.

After his AFL career, Davenport joined the North Shore Football Club, where he played and served as senior coach until 2017.

At the end of 2017, he returned to the AFL as a development coach at Carlton.

In August 2020, Davenport was let go due to the COVID-19 Pandemic and took up a role with the Oakleigh Chargers in the NAB League.
