= Kane Lambert =

Australian rules footballer (born 1991)

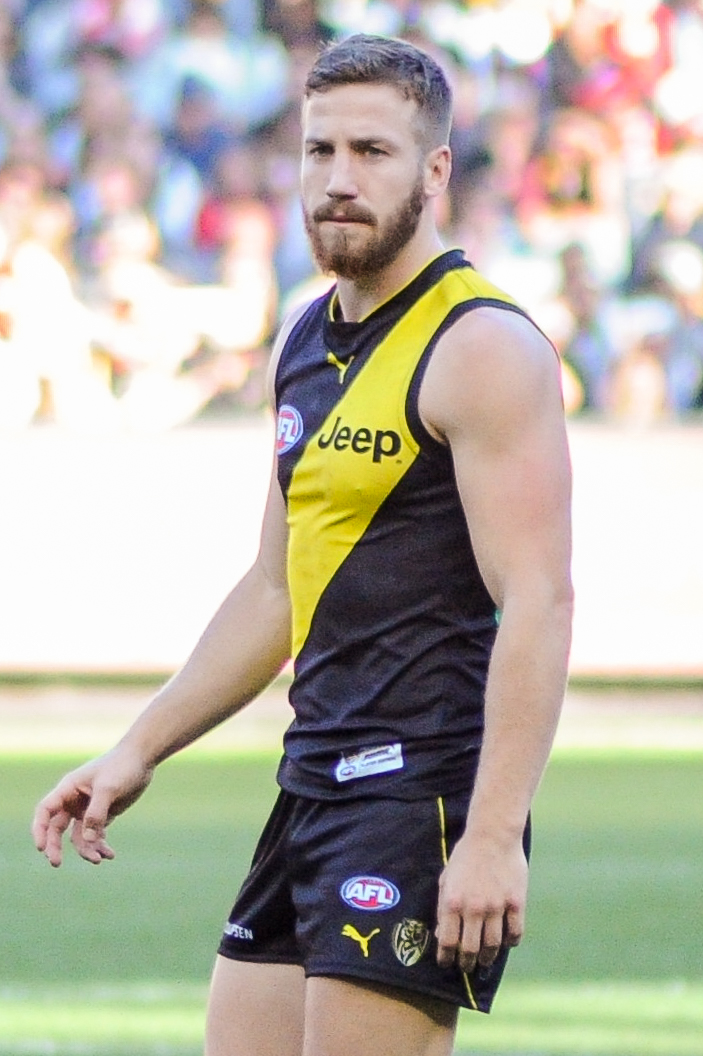
- Lambert with Richmond in June 2017

Personal information
- Born: 26 November 1991 (age 34)
- Original teams: Williamstown (VFL); Northern Knights (TAC Cup)
- Draft: No. 46, 2015 rookie draft
- Debut: Round 2, 2015, Richmond vs. Western Bulldogs, at MCG
- Height: 178 cm (5 ft 10 in)
- Weight: 77 kg (170 lb)
- Position: Forward / midfielder

Playing career^{1}
| Years | Club | Games (Goals) |
| 2015–2022 | Richmond | 135 (78) |
- ^{1} Playing statistics correct to the end of 2022 season.

Career highlights
- AFL: 3× AFL premiership player: 2017, 2019, 2020; Jack Titus Medal (2nd RFC B&F): 2018; Maurie Fleming Medal (3rd RFC B&F): 2017; VFL: VFL Team of the Year: 2013; Fothergill–Round Medal: 2013; Northern Blues best and fairest: 2013

Kane Lambert (born 26 November 1991) is a former professional Australian rules football player who played for the Richmond Football Club in the Australian Football League (AFL). He went undrafted after a junior career with the Northern Knights in the TAC Cup, before a four-year stint at state-league level that included being named in the VFL's team of the year and receiving the league's most improved player award in 2013. Lambert was drafted to Richmond in the 2015 rookie draft and made his debut for the club in round 1 of the 2015 season. He is a triple-premiership player with the club, having played in grand final wins in 2017, 2019 and 2020.

== Junior and state-league football ==
Lambert grew up in Preston, a suburb nine kilometres north of Melbourne.

He played local junior football with the Preston Bullants Junior Football club before playing in representative sides with the Northern Knights in the TAC Cup where he was coached by former AFL premiership coach Denis Pagan. In 2009 Lambert won the club's best and fairest award for a season in which he averaged 25 disposals, five clearances, five tackles and one goal per game. He was overlooked in the AFL national, pre-season and rookie drafts following the 2009 season and subsequently ceased playing football in his first year out of school. He instead spent the year working full-time in a can factory while completing what he later called "a 12-month pre-season" in which he added 10 kg to his slender frame.

Lambert made a return to the sport in 2011, playing at state-league level with the Northern Bullants in the Victorian Football League (VFL). He remained at the club through a name change in 2012 when he was selected in a team of the VFL's best players that would represent Victoria in a state-league exhibition match. 2013 proved a break-out year for Lambert, having been again named to represent the state-league during a season in which he kicked 21 goals and averaged 26 disposals per game. As a result, he earned a fourth-placed finish in the J. J. Liston Trophy for the league's best and fairest player, doing so with a total of 16 votes and finishing just one vote behind the eventual three joint-winners. He was also awarded the Fothergill–Round Medal as the competition's most promising young player and was named on the wing in the VFL's official Team of the Year. In addition, Lambert placed fifth in the VFL Coach's Award and received the Laurie Hill Trophy as his club's best and fairest player. He was later invited to that year's national draft combine where he recorded a 13.11 beep test score. Despite his strong season, he again went undrafted to the AFL.

Lambert moved VFL clubs in 2014, crossing to the Williamstown Football Club in a poaching move that saw Williamstown attract criticism by the governing body, AFL Victoria. His season began slowly, with hip arthroscopic surgery limiting his off-season progress and making him wait until round 3 to play his first match for the club. During the year he played a contributing role in the club's Foxtel Cup premiership victory over West Perth. In the finals series Lambert turned in an incredible performance in his side's semi-final victory over Werribee, where he recorded 32 disposals, 17 clearances, 15 inside 50s and four goals. He kicked three of those goals in the match's final quarter as part of nine straight unanswered goals by Williamstown. An outstanding back-half of the season including that final saw Lambert again in AFL draft contention, but again missing out on selection in the national and pre-season drafts.

== AFL career ==
=== 2015 season ===
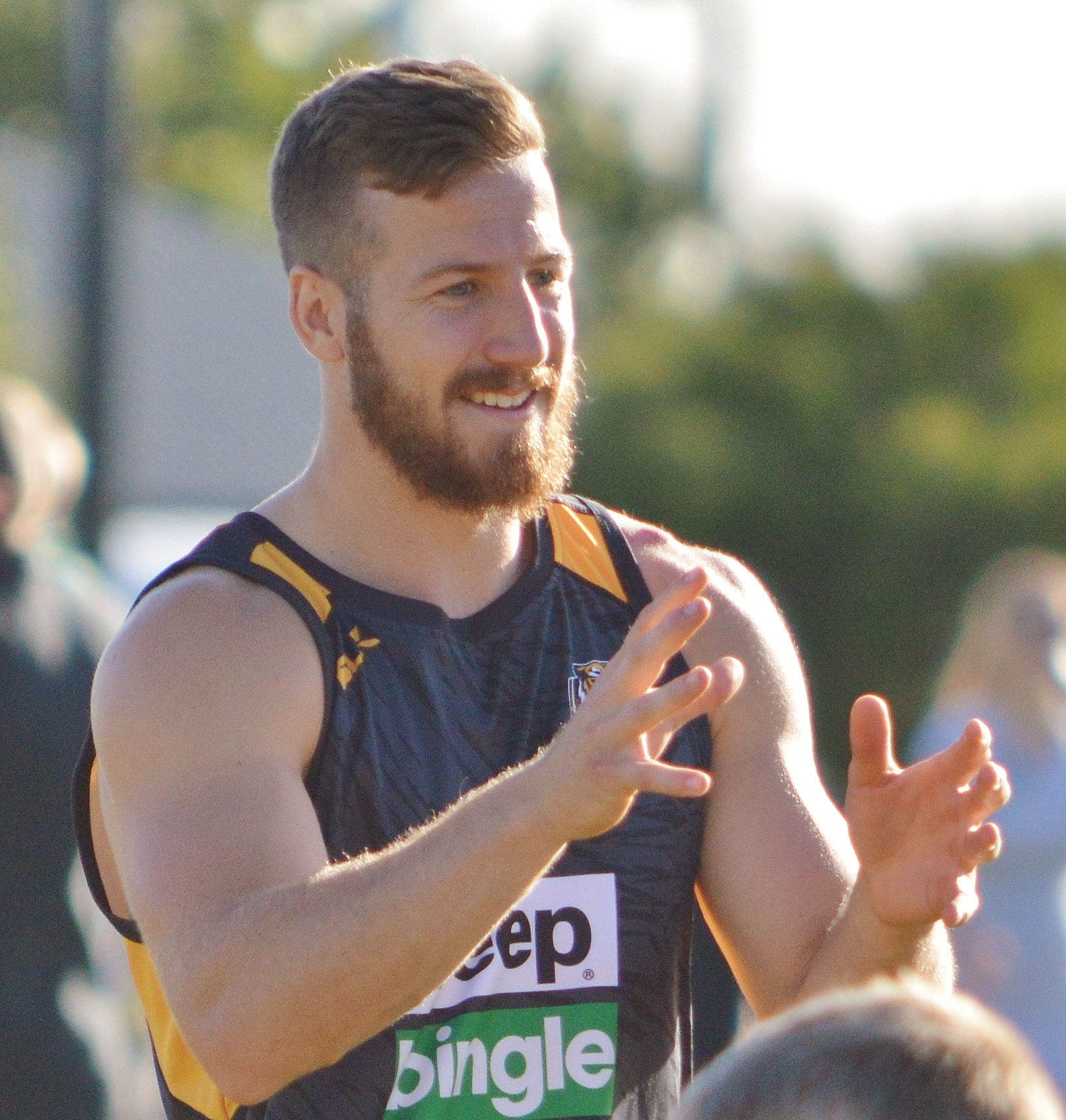
Lambert training in December 2016

At age 23, Lambert was drafted to the Australian Football League by Richmond with the club's third selection and the 46th pick overall in the 2015 rookie draft in December 2014.

He made his first appearance for Richmond in the club's opening match of the pre-season competition. A further two matches in the pre-season would follow before Lambert was upgraded to the club's senior list ahead of the season's opening match. Lambert narrowly avoided senior selection in round 1, named only as an emergency for that match with Carlton. His AFL debut would come the following week in a match against the Western Bulldogs at the MCG. Lambert was substituted out of the match in the third quarter after sustaining a serious shoulder injury. The damage was later diagnosed as a separated shoulder and would require surgery to repair, seeing Lambert sidelined for an estimated six to eight weeks. He made his return to football with the club's reserves side in the VFL in late June. Despite playing only limited game time due to his ongoing recovery, Lambert still recorded 28 disposals, eight clearances and a goal. He earned an AFL-level recall the following week, in round 13's victory over Sydney. A further seven straight matches with the senior side followed before Lambert turned in a two-goal, 27 disposal performance against the Gold Coast in round 20 that saw him named in the club's best players that day. He went on to play in each of the club's final four matches of the year, including a losing elimination final against North Melbourne. At season's end he placed seventh in the AFL Players Association's best first year player award. He had played 13 matches and kicked eight goals at senior level that year.

=== 2016 season ===
Ahead of the 2016 season Lambert was upgraded permanently to Richmond's senior list and made a switch in guernsey numbers from 48 to 23. He opened the pre-season and the season-proper with Richmond's best-22, playing a starring role with a team-high 28 disposals, game-high seven tackles and a goal in round 1's season-opening victory over Carlton. For that performance he received the maximum ten votes in the Coaches Association player of the year award and earned recognition from television broadcaster the Seven Network as the player of the game. Lambert followed that match with two goals against Collingwood in round 2, before kicking goals in each of the two matches after that. In round 6 Lambert suffered a fractured rib and punctured lung. He missed just two matches as a result of the injury and made his return in round 9's win over Fremantle. A further five matches at AFL-level would follow before Lambert was omitted from the senior side ahead of round 16. After two weeks of VFL football Lambert earned his way back into senior selection for a single match in round 19 before being again omitted the following week. A final two matches at senior level came in round 22 and 23 with Lambert finishing the year having played 15 AFL matches.

=== 2017 season ===
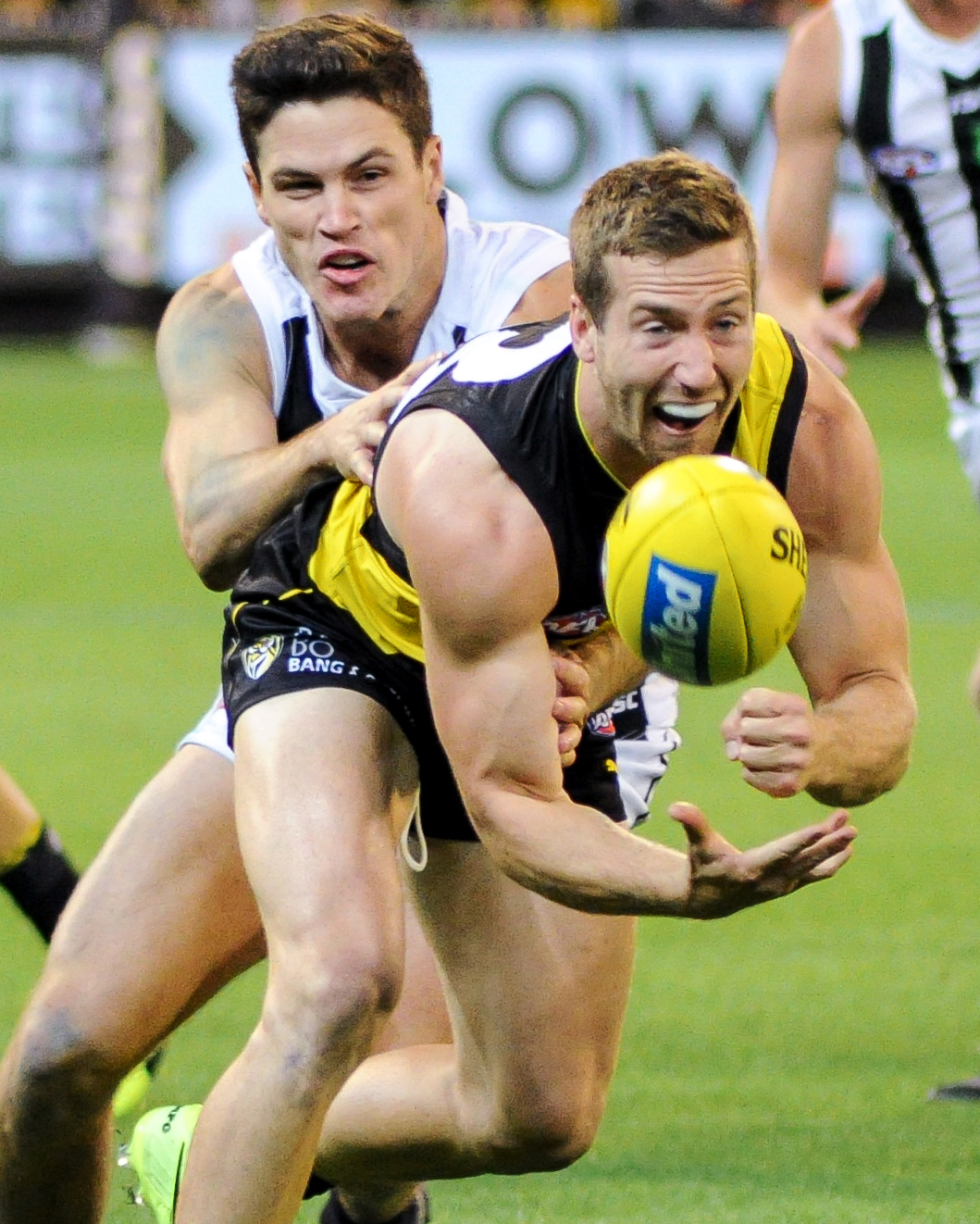
Lambert handballs during play in round 2, 2017

Despite finishing the year previous at AFL level, Lambert would start 2017 by earning selection in only one of a possible three matches pre-season matches before starting the home and away season with the club's reserves side in the VFL. He earned an early chance at senior level in round 2, recalled for the club's 19-point victory over Collingwood. Lambert made an impact the following week when he was given a tagging role on West Coast midfielder Sam Mitchell for the final three quarters of the match. He limited Mitchell to just 13 possessions from that point forward, after the former-Brownlow Medalist had registered 12 in the match's opening term. Lambert continued to contribute at AFL level over the following two months, reaching the season's midpoint with what would be a career-best average of 18.8 disposals per game. In round 12, the final match of that stretch, he earned a coaches award vote and a mention by The Age as one of Richmond's best for his performance in a win over North Melbourne. Lambert was again in the bests in round 14, this time named as such by AFL Media for a 26 disposal, six tackle and one-goal effort against Carlton. The following week he registered career bests in disposals (33) and tackles (10), as well as his first career Brownlow Medal votes in Richmond's road victory over Port Adelaide. In round 20 Lambert was best on ground and received the maximum 10 coaches association award votes for his 30 disposal, eight inside-50 performance against Hawthorn. He earned another mention in the bests the following week in round 21 before kicking a career-best three goals in Richmond's 104-point demolition of Fremantle in round 22. He played his 50th career match at the start of the finals series, in Richmond's qualifying final victory over Geelong. The following week he kicked a goal as his side defeated Greater Western Sydney in a preliminary final and won its way through to its first grand final in 35 years. Lambert was in some doubt to be fit for the match though, after sustaining a minor ankle injury in the earlier game. He had managed to play out the end of the preliminary final however and ultimately earned selection in the grand final that followed. There he became a premiership player, kicking a goal and adding 22 disposals in the club's first premiership since 1980. At the conclusion of the season and finals series Lambert was named at number 50 in Herald Sun chief football reporter Mark Robinson's list of the league's best players in 2017. He finished the year ranked fifth in the competition for total goal assists as well as second at the club for goal assists and tackles and fourth for inside 50s. Lambert also placed third in the club's best and fairest award, earning the Maurie Fleming Medal for his outstanding season.

=== 2018 season ===
In the weeks following his side's premiership win in 2017, Lambert underwent minor knee surgery. It would not reduce his training time however, with a return to training occurring on schedule with the rest of the squad in late November 2017. Lambert kicked four goals and was among Richmond's best in one match during the club's pre-season campaign, before opening the season-proper with a win over Carlton at the MCG. He played a key role in round 4's 93-point win over Brisbane, notching 26 disposals, two goals and earning a mention among Richmond's best by AFL Media. The following week he was named best-on-ground by the Herald Sun for a two-goal performance against Melbourne in the marquee ANZAC Day eve match. Lambert was again a multiple goal scorer in round 7, earning himself seven AFL Coaches Award votes to tie as Richmond's equal-best player that week. Another three goals followed in round 8 where he was again a selection among Richmond's best by AFL Media. After a quiet three week stretch where he averaged just 15 disposals, Lambert returned to Richmond's best with 26 disposals in round 12. He earned the honour once again the following week, before the club had a one-week bye in round 14. Lambert added three goals and an equal team-high 27 disposals to earn seven AFL Coaches votes in the club's return match in round 15. He notched a new career-high with 33 disposals in a win over Adelaide the following week. After 18 rounds, Lambert ranked 10th in the league for score involvements and was 13th in the race for the AFL Coaches Association award. He added another strong performance with 31 disposals in round 20's win over Geelong before sustaining a minor syndesmosis sprain in his ankle in the final quarter of a match against Gold Coast in round 21. Lambert underwent minor surgery to reinforce the joint, missing the final two weeks of the home and away season as a result. For his career-best performances during the season, Lambert was one of 40 players pre-selected to the All-Australian squad of 40 players, though ultimately went unselected for final honours that year. He was also one of three Richmond players nominated for the AFL Players Association's Most Valuable Player award. Lambert made a full injury recovery in his three weeks on the sidelines, including during the post-season bye, before returning in the club's qualifying final win over Hawthorn. He contributed 26 disposals and three goal assists in that match, to go with a career-high 17 contested possessions. Lambert's finals run would extend just one more match however, when Richmond was eliminated with a shock preliminary final loss to rivals Collingwood. Following the conclusion of the 2018 finals series, Lambert was named by the Herald Sun's chief football writer Mark Robinson as the league's 32nd best player during the 2018 season. He also attracted 12 votes in the Brownlow Medal (second among Richmond players) and improved one spot on his previous year's effort to place second in the Richmond club best and fairest award.

=== 2019 season ===
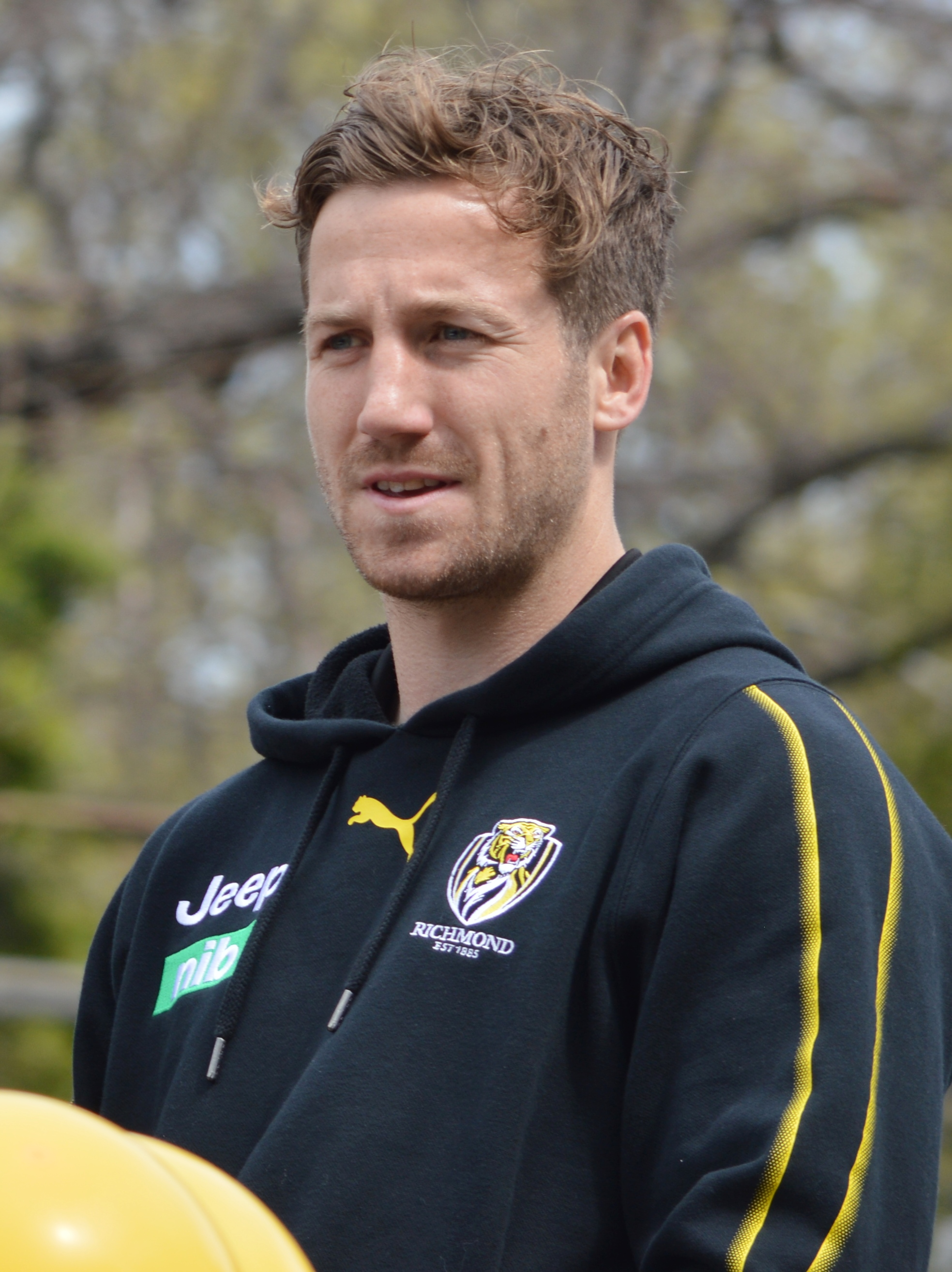
Lambert in the 2019 AFL Grand Final Parade

Ahead of the 2019 season, Lambert was rated the 49th best player in the league according to the AFL statistics partner Champion Data's AFL Player Ratings system. It confirmed a significant rise to stardom over the two previous seasons, after beginning the 2017 season ranked 298th and placing 151st after the first three rounds of 2018. He started 2019 with appearances in each of the club's two pre-season matches before recording 30 disposals and eight Coches votes as the second best player on field in round 1's season-opening match against Carlton. Lambert was influential in rounds 3 and 5, contributing 34 disposals and a goal in a loss to Greater Western Sydney and 29 disposals to go with eight inside-50s in a win over Melbourne, respectively. In the weeks that followed, Lambert was elevated to the club's informal leadership group after injuries to all official captains and vice captains saw the need for a new temporary leadership structure. He developed Achilles tendinopathy in his ankle after kicking one goal and recording 27 disposals in round 9's away win over Fremantle and despite playing well through pain in round 9's win over Hawthorn, was eventually rested from match play in round 10. Symptoms continued to plague Lambert over the next month, leading Richmond officials to rule him out through the club's mid-season bye. After six weeks on the sidelines, Lambert returned to football with 23 disposals in a round 15 win over St Kilda in which he was named by AFL Media as one of Richmond's best players. He kicked three goals along with 24 disposals in a win over Gold Coast the following week, earning selection in AFL Media's Team of the Week and seven coaches votes as the equal-second best player in that match. Lambert repeated the effort in round 18, again kicking three goals but this time earning nine votes as co-best on ground along with Team of the Week honours. Following those performances, Lambert was labelled by Fox Footy "as one of the most reliable players at (Richmond)". To that point in the season he ranked number one at the club for contested possessions per game. Lambert kicked four goals total over the last four matches of the season, and was named in the AFL's Player Ratings team of the year at the conclusion of home and away matches that year. In the first round of the finals, Lambert was his "always reliable" self according to Fox Footy, recording 20 disposals in Richmond's 47-point qualifying final victory over the Brisbane Lions. He kicked a goal along with 18 disposals but also had eight turnovers as his side defeated Geelong in the preliminary final a fortnight later and earned a grand final matchup against Greater Western Sydney. AFL Media described Lambert as "again influential" in the grand final, as he kicked one goal and had 19 disposals to help his side to an 89-point victory that earned him a second premiership in three years. He placed seventh in the club's best and fairest count that year, after a season which included 21 games and a career-best 18 goals. He finished the year ranked third among Richmond players for total inside-50s, fourth for handballs and fifth for goals, clearances and tackles.

=== 2020 season ===
Lambert began 2020 with appearances in each of the club's two pre-season series matches in March, but sat out the majority of the second match after sustaining a concussion in a collision with Greater Western Sydney forward Jeremy Cameron. He recovered in time to contribute 14 disposals and a goal in a round 1 win over Carlton two weeks later which was played extraordinary conditions imposed on the league as a result of the rapid progression of the coronavirus pandemic into Australia. In what the league planned would be the first of a reduced 17-round season, the match was played without crowds in attendance due to public health prohibitions on large gatherings and with playing time length reduced by one fifth in order to reduce the physical load on players who would be expected to play multiple matches with short breaks in the second half of the year. Just three days later, the AFL Commission suspended the season for an indefinite period after multiple states enforced quarantine conditions on their borders that effectively ruled out the possibility of continuing the season as planned. Lambert contributed 14 disposals and a goal when the season resumed with a draw against Collingwood in early-June after an 11-week hiatus. In round 5, Lambert played a starring role his 100th career AFL match, judged best-on-ground with a maximum 10 coaches votes for a performance that included 27 disposals, five clearances and three goals. In the week that followed, Lambert and his Richmond teammates were relocated to the Gold Coast following a virus outbreak in Melbourne, where they would be based for the remainder of the season. Despite missing best-on-ground honours in a round 6 win over Sydney in Brisbane that weekend, Lambert was again judged his side's best player with five coaches votes for recording 22 disposals, six inside-50s and an equal game-high six tackles. After the first nine matches of the season, Lambert ranked first among all players at Richmond for total handballs that season, as well as third for inside-50s and equal-fourth for total clearances. In round 12 he recorded 22 disposals to earn three coaches award votes as the fourth best player of the game, before missing one match in round 15 with a minor hip injury. He returned in time for the final two games of the season, including a 18 disposal and one goal game against Adelaide that earned him two coaches votes. Lambert recorded 19 disposals in his side's first-up qualifying final loss to the Brisbane Lions, before adding 13 disposals in a semi-final win over St Kilda the following week. He was his side's equal-third best player in the preliminary final, kicking two final quarter goal to earn three coaches votes in the comeback win over Port Adelaide. He became a three-time premiership player the following week, contributing 13 disposals and a goal in his side's 31-point grand final victory over Geelong. In addition to his premiership silverware, Lambert earned ninth place in the club's best and fairest award, after playing in 20 of a possible 21 matches that season. He also received the Francis Bourke Award, a player-voted honour for the player who most embodies team values over the course of the season.

=== 2021 season ===
Lambert struggled to find any consistency, only playing 13 games in 2021, as Richmond missed the finals. His highest disposal tally that year was a 28-disposal effort against Carlton in Round 1, but his best game would come against West Coast at Optus Stadium in Round 13, kicking 2.1 from 27 disposals.

=== 2022 season and retirement ===
On July 25, 2022, as a result of constant injury troubles, Lambert announced his immediate retirement from AFL. He had only played 7 games in 2022, with his first game coming in Round 7 of that year.

== Player profile ==
Lambert plays mainly as a high half-forward, but is also adept at roles as both an inside midfielder and wing. He is notable for his significant endurance capability that allows him to cover the ground both defensively and as part of running chains of offensive possession.

== AFL statistics ==
Updated to the end of the 2022 season.

Legend
| G | Goals | K | Kicks | D | Disposals | T | Tackles |
| B | Behinds | H | Handballs | M | Marks |

| Season | Team | No. | Games | Totals | | | | | | | Averages (per game) | | | | | | | Votes |
| Season | Team | No. | Games | G | B | K | H | D | M | T | G | B | K | H | D | M | T | Votes |
|---|---|---|---|---|---|---|---|---|---|---|---|---|---|---|---|---|---|---|
| 2015 | Richmond | 48 | 13 | 8 | 7 | 114 | 89 | 203 | 44 | 32 | 0.6 | 0.5 | 8.8 | 6.8 | 15.6 | 3.4 | 2.5 | 0 |
| 2016 | Richmond | 23 | 15 | 7 | 10 | 122 | 99 | 221 | 48 | 54 | 0.5 | 0.7 | 8.1 | 6.6 | 14.7 | 3.2 | 3.6 | 0 |
| 2017^{#} | Richmond | 23 | 24 | 13 | 13 | 252 | 263 | 515 | 86 | 110 | 0.5 | 0.5 | 10.5 | 11.0 | 21.5 | 3.6 | 4.6 | 2 |
| 2018 | Richmond | 23 | 22 | 15 | 12 | 205 | 291 | 496 | 80 | 66 | 0.7 | 0.5 | 9.3 | 13.2 | 22.5 | 3.6 | 3.0 | 12 |
| 2019^{#} | Richmond | 23 | 21 | 18 | 6 | 221 | 243 | 455 | 97 | 70 | 0.9 | 0.3 | 10.5 | 11.6 | 21.7 | 4.6 | 3.3 | 4 |
| 2020^{#} (Note: The 2020 season was played with 17 home-and-away matches per team (down from 22) and 16-minute quarters with time on (down from 20-minute quarters with time on) due to the impact of the COVID-19 pandemic.) | Richmond | 23 | 20 | 10 | 3 | 137 | 175 | 312 | 61 | 68 | 0.5 | 0.2 | 6.9 | 8.8 | 15.6 | 3.1 | 3.4 | 6 |
| 2021 | Richmond | 23 | 13 | 6 | 4 | 137 | 131 | 268 | 54 | 40 | 0.5 | 0.3 | 10.5 | 10.1 | 20.6 | 4.2 | 3.1 | 3 |
| 2022 | Richmond | 23 | 7 | 1 | 2 | 51 | 39 | 90 | 21 | 15 | 0.1 | 0.3 | 7.3 | 5.6 | 12.9 | 3.0 | 2.1 | 0 |
| Career | | | 135 | 78 | 57 | 1239 | 1321 | 2560 | 491 | 455 | 0.6 | 0.4 | 9.2 | 9.8 | 19.0 | 3.6 | 3.4 | 27 |

== Honours and achievements ==
Team

- 3× AFL premiership player (Richmond): 2017, 2019, 2020
- McClelland Trophy (Richmond): 2018

Individual

- Jack Titus Medal (2nd RFC B&F): 2018
- Maurie Fleming Medal (3rd RFC B&F): 2017
- All-Australian squad: 2018

VFL

- VFL Team of the Year: 2013
- Fothergill–Round Medal (most improved player): 2013
- Northern Blues best and fairest: 2013

Junior

- Northern Knights best and fairest: 2009

== Personal life ==
Lambert is lifelong friends with former Richmond player Adam Marcon. The pair played together at junior level, at the Northern Knights, the Northern Blues, Williamstown and at Richmond. Lambert was Marcon's best man at the latter's wedding the day after Lambert's 2017 grand final win.
