= Tom Blamires =

Australian rules footballer (born 2002)

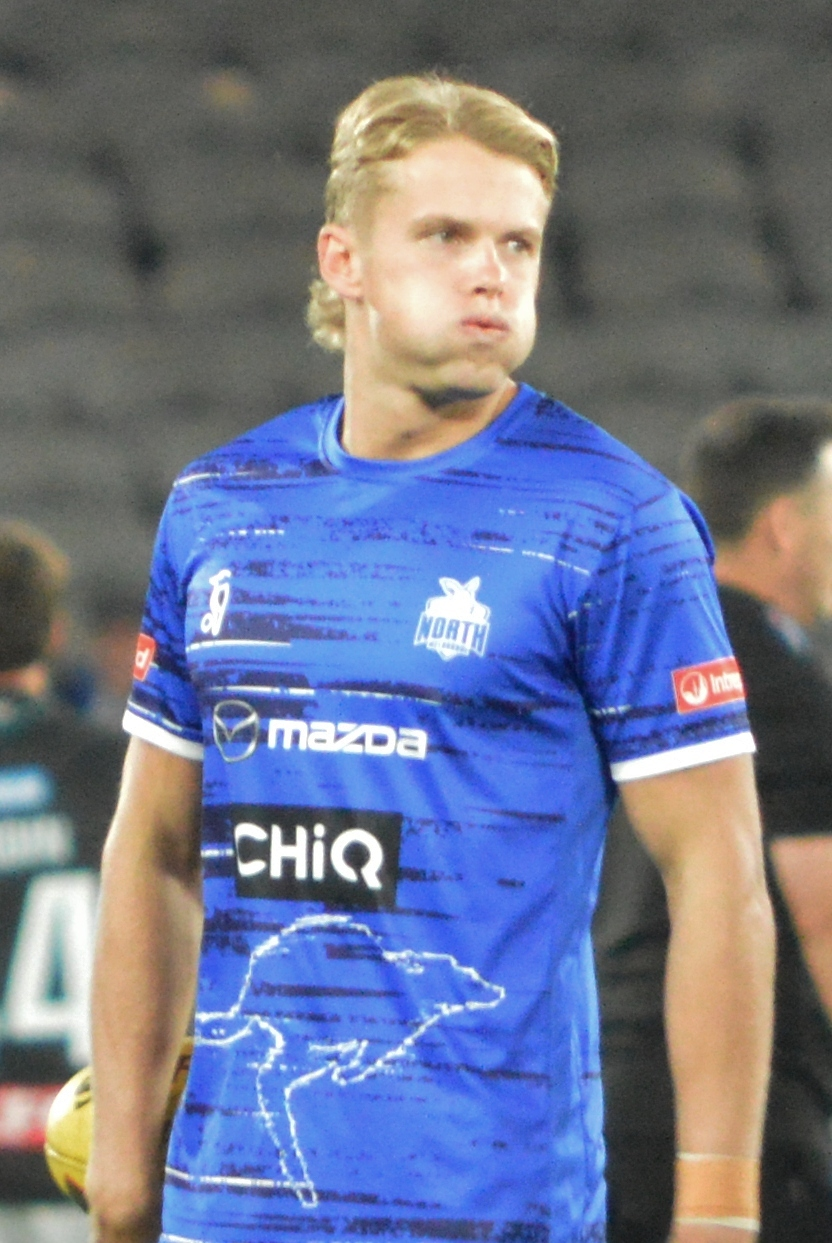
- Blamires in March 2026

Personal information
- Full name: Tom Blamires
- Born: 13 August 2002 (age 24)
- Original team: East Sandringham/East Brighton/Brighton Beach/Sandringham Dragons/Sandringham Zebras/Frankston
- Draft: 2026 pre-season supplemental selection period
- Debut: Round 1, 2026, North Melbourne vs. Port Adelaide, at Docklands Stadium
- Height: 193 cm (6 ft 4 in)
- Position: Midfielder/Defender

Club information
- Current club: North Melbourne
- Number: 39

Playing career^{1}
Years	Club	Games (Goals)
2026–	North Melbourne	16 (3)
- ^{1} Playing statistics correct to the end of round 22, 2026.

Career highlights
- Fothergill–Round–Mitchell Medal: 2025

Tom Blamires (born 13 August 2002) is a professional Australian rules footballer who plays for the North Melbourne Football Club in the Australian Football League (AFL).

== Junior and VFL career ==
Blamires played junior football in the South Metro Junior Football League for several teams including East Sandringham, East Brighton and Brighton Beach.

Blamires played in the Talent League for the Sandringham Dragons and school football for Brighton Grammar.

Blamires joined the Sandringham Zebras in the VFL in 2023. He moved to Frankston in 2025. While playing for Frankston, Blamires worked for the Collingwood Football Club as part of their corporate sales team. When Blamires faced Collingwood's VFL side mid-year, he gathered 44 disposals, six tackles and four clearances. At the end of the 2025 VFL season, Blamires was awarded the Fothergill–Round–Mitchell Medal as the best young player in the VFL.

== AFL career ==
Ahead of the 2026 AFL season, Blamires was invited by North Melbourne to train for a list spot during the 2026 pre-season supplemental selection period. He was officially added to their list on 25 February 2026. He made his debut in round one of the 2026 AFL season against Port Adelaide. Blamires, a defender, kicked his first goal in the AFL in his third game, in North’s round 3 victory over Essendon.

== Statistics ==
Updated to the end of round 22, 2026.

Legend
G	Goals	K	Kicks	D	Disposals	T	Tackles
B	Behinds	H	Handballs	M	Marks

Season	Team	No.	Games	Totals							Averages (per game)							Votes
Season	Team	No.	Games	G	B	K	H	D	M	T	G	B	K	H	D	M	T	Votes
2026	North Melbourne	39	16	3	4	157	117	274	53	25	0.2	0.3	9.8	7.3	17.1	3.3	1.6	0
Career			16	3	4	157	117	274	53	25	0.2	0.3	9.8	7.3	17.1	3.3	1.6	0
