= Adam Marcon =

Australian rules footballer (born 1992)

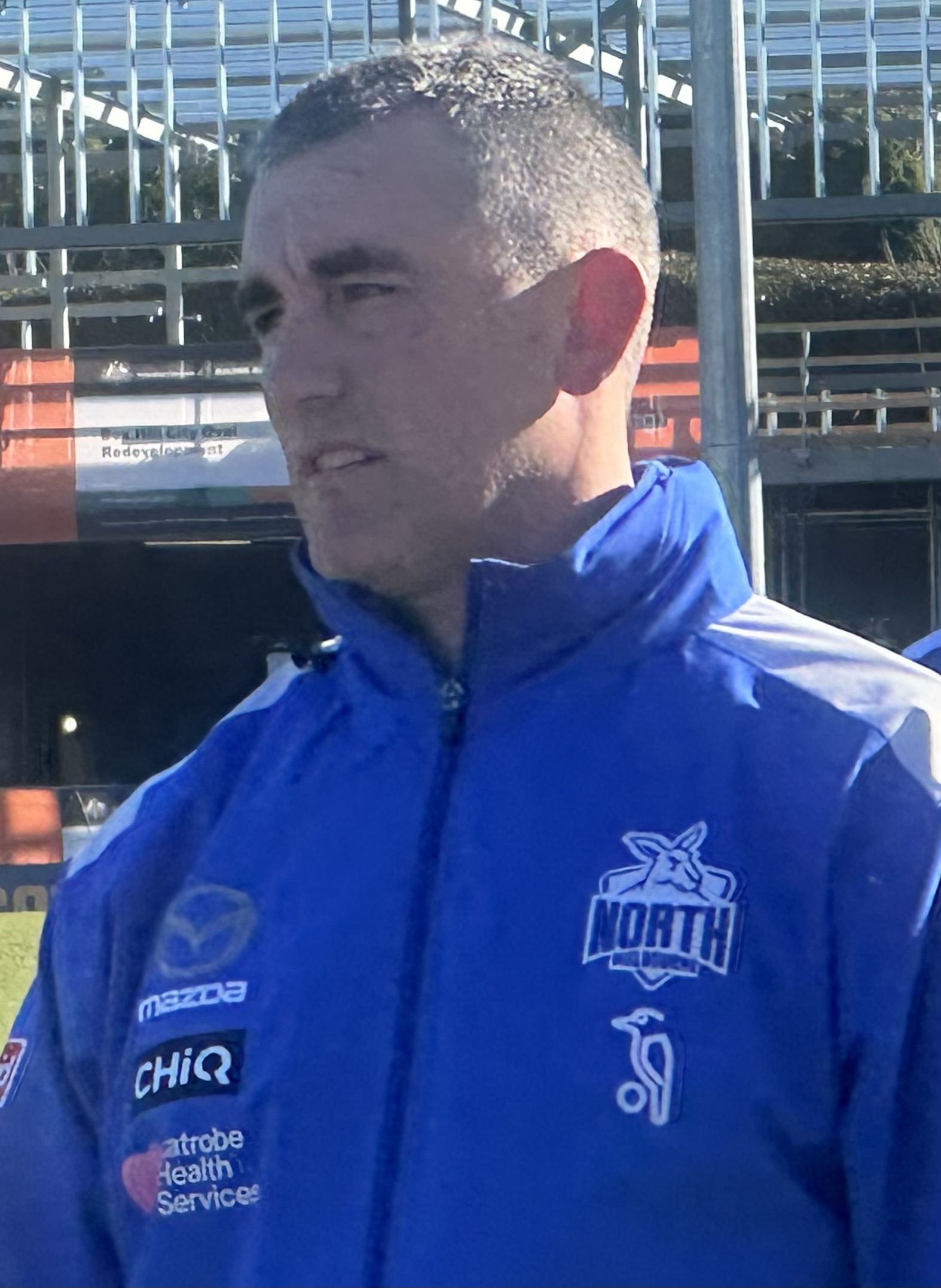
- Marcon in August 2026

Personal information
- Full name: Adam Marcon
- Born: 28 July 1992 (age 34)
- Original team: Williamstown (VFL)
- Draft: No. 47, 2016 rookie draft
- Debut: Round 19, 2016, Richmond vs. Greater Western Sydney, at Manuka Oval
- Height: 180 cm (5 ft 11 in)
- Weight: 80 kg (176 lb)
- Position: Midfielder

Playing career^{1}
Years	Club	Games (Goals)
2016	Richmond	2 (1)
- ^{1} Playing statistics correct to the end of 2016.

Career highlights
- VFL: VFL premiership player: 2015; Guinane Medal (RFC B&F): 2016; Fothergill–Round Medal: 2015; Laurie Hill Trophy (NBFC B&F): 2012

Adam Marcon (born 28 July 1992) is an Australian rules footballer coach and former player who serves as the coach of North Melbourne in the Victorian Football League (VFL).

== Junior and state-league football ==
A midfielder, Marcon played under-18s football TAC Cup football for the Northern Knights. Once at senior age, Marcon joined the Northern Bullants in the Victorian Football League, the club where his father Adrian had been a popular dual-premiership player in the 1980s. Marcon played three seasons for the Northern Bullants (or Blues, as they became known from 2012) from 2011 until 2013, and won the Laurie Hill Trophy as club best-and-fairest in 2012. He then transferred to Williamstown where he played the next two seasons. In 2015, he won the Fothergill–Round Medal as the best young player in the VFL, and was part of Williamstown's premiership team.

== AFL career ==
After his success in the VFL, Marcon was drafted to the Australian Football League by the Richmond Football Club with its third selection in the 2016 rookie draft (No. 47 overall). He made his AFL debut in Round 19, 2016 against Greater Western Sydney at Manuka Oval, and played one further game for the club before the end of the 2016. He won the Guinane Medal as the club's VFL best and fairest, but was de-listed at the end of the season.

== Return to state-league football ==
Following his AFL de-listing from Richmond Marcon returned to play VFL football at Williamstown. He became the club's captain in 2018.

Adam played his 100th game for Williamstown in their first home game of the 2021 season on the redeveloped surface defeating Port Melbourne and becoming a Life Member of the Williamstown Football Club.

After his retirement from the Williamstown Football Club in 2021, he then signed with the Aberfeldie Football Club in the EDFL on a "Player-Coach" term for the upcoming 2022 Premier Season (A-Grade). In his first EDFL game Marcon kicked 2 goals in an 80–66 Win against Maribyrnong Park.

== Other work ==
Outside of football, Marcon works as a school PE teacher at Penleigh and Essendon Grammar School, where he is a school coordinator.
