= 2013 Foxtel Cup =

2013 premiership season
- Teams: 10
- Premiers: West Adelaide

The 2013 Foxtel Cup was the third season of the Australian rules football knock-out cup competition involving clubs from the various state league competitions from around Australia.

The Cup's purpose is to support and promote the second-tier Australian rules football competitions and to provide another way of developing lower-tier Australian Football League (AFL) players.

All matches, as in previous years, were broadcast by Fox Footy.

The format of the competition saw four significant changes from the first two years of the competition:

- The number of teams competing was reduced from sixteen to ten.
- The qualifiers from the Tasmanian Football League and the North East Australian Football League competed in a separate pre-qualifying round before progressing to play against the Victorian, South Australian and Western Australian qualifiers.
- With the exception of the pre-qualifying round, matches played on Tuesday nights as stand alone games. Previously they had been played on Saturdays, usually as curtain-raisers to AFL matches, forcing the state leagues to schedule extra bye weeks to accommodate Foxtel Cup games.
- The prizemoney was increased to $100,000.

For the first time, the highest-ranked qualifiers from each state all elected to compete in the competition; in the previous two years, the top South Australian clubs had declined to participate. However, both the VFL premiers and the NEAFL premiers in 2012 were reserves teams for AFL clubs (Geelong and Brisbane Lions respectively), so neither was invited to participate.

The competition began in April 2013 and concluded with the Grand Final in August 2013, in which West Adelaide defeated East Fremantle by four points at AAMI Stadium in a low scoring thriller. It was the Bloods' first trophy of any sort since their last SANFL premiership in 1983.

West Adelaide onballer (and former AFL player for the Crows and Lions) Chris Schmidt was awarded the Coles Medal as best-on-ground in the Grand Final for his unrelenting performance that included 26 disposals and nine clearances. He also operated at 81 per cent disposal efficiency.

== 2013 season ==
=== Participating clubs ===
NEAFL Eastern Conference (1)

- Queanbeyan

NEAFL Northern Conference (2)

- Northern Territory
- Southport

SANFL (2)

- Norwood
- West Adelaide
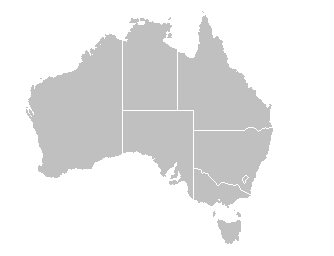

TFL (1)

- Burnie

VFL (2)

- Port Melbourne
- Werribee

WAFL (2)

- Claremont
- East Fremantle

=== Club details ===
Guernsey	Club	Nickname	Location	Qualified as
	Burnie Football Club	Dockers	Burnie, Tasmania	Tasmanian Football League premiers 2012
	Claremont Football Club	Tigers	Claremont, Western Australia	West Australian Football League premiers 2012
	East Fremantle Football Club	Sharks	East Fremantle, Western Australia	West Australian Football League runners-up 2012
	Northern Territory Football Club	Thunder	Darwin, Northern Territory	NEAFL Northern Conference runners-up 2012
	Norwood Football Club	Redlegs	Norwood, South Australia	South Australian National Football League premiers 2012
	Port Melbourne Football Club	Borough	Port Melbourne, Victoria	Victorian Football League runners-up 2012
	Queanbeyan Football Club	Tigers	Queanbeyan, New South Wales	NEAFL Eastern Conference premiers 2012
	Southport Australian Football Club	Sharks	Southport, Queensland	NEAFL Northern Conference; 3rd place 2012
	Werribee Football Club	Tigers	Werribee, Victoria	Victorian Football League; 3rd place 2012
	West Adelaide Football Club	Bloods	Richmond, South Australia	South Australian National Football League runners-up 2012

== Stadiums ==
Adelaide	Canberra	Gold Coast
AAMI Stadium; Capacity: 51,224	Manuka Oval; Capacity: 13,550	Metricon Stadium; Capacity: 25,000
Melbourne	Melbourne	Perth
Etihad Stadium; Capacity: 56,347	Melbourne Cricket Ground; Capacity: 100,000	Patersons Stadium; Capacity: 43,500

== Fixture ==
The AFL released the fixture on 3 December 2012.
2013 Foxtel Cup Fixture

=== Bracket ===
Qualifying round
Queanbeyan	13	10	88
NT Thunder	4	11	35
Southport	11	11	77
Burnie	7	7	49

Round one
Werribee	16	17	113
Queanbeyan	4	4	28
Norwood	4	11	35
East Fremantle	6	6	42
Port Melbourne	9	4	58
West Adelaide	17	9	111
Claremont	12	8	80
Southport	4	2	26

Semifinals
Werribee	2	4	16
East Fremantle	6	4	40
West Adelaide	6	7	43
Claremont	3	8	26

Grand final
East Fremantle	2	16	28
West Adelaide	4	8	32

=== Qualifying round ===
Q1 13 April 2013; 11:35 EST	Queanbeyan	88 – 35 curtain raiser to GWS v St. Kilda	Northern Territory Thunder	Manuka Oval match report match statistics
	2.3 (15); 6.5 (41); 10.6 (66); 13.10 (88)	Match report	2.2 (14); 3.3 (21); 3.8 (26); 4.11 (35)
		Goals
	Stevens 4, Fulford 3, Quade 3, Griggs, Conroy, Kavanagh		Ngalkin 2, Ilett, Dunn
		Bests
	Stevens, Klemke, Fulford, Conroy		Ilett, Ngalkin, Lockwood, Vassal

Q2 20 April 2013; 14:35 EST	Southport	77 – 49 curtain raiser to Gold Coast v Port Adelaide	Burnie	Metricon Stadium match report match statistics
	4.1 (25); 7.5 (47); 10.6 (66); 11.11 (77)	Source:	3.1 (19); 4.1 (25); 4.4 (28); 7.7 (49)
		Goals
	Baxter 3, Kiel 2, Merrett 2, Carr, Mills, Thynne, Screech		Laycock 3, Baldock 2, Morrison, Hayes
		Bests
	Baxter, Mills, Burge, Wise		Banham, Laycock, Barrett, Munday

=== Round 1 ===
Game #1 21 May 2013; 20:05 CST	Norwood	35 – 42 stand alone game	East Fremantle	AAMI Stadium match report match statistics
	3.2 (20); 4.4 (28); 4.6 (30); 4.11 (35)	match report	1.0 (6); 4.1 (25); 5.5 (35); 6.6 (42)
		Goals
	M Evans 2, Donohue, Bampton		Boyle 2, Henson, Lester-Smith, Ricciardello, Cronan
		Bests
	Bampton, Fuller, Murphy, Pfeiffer		: O’Brien, McGough, Lester-Smith, Hancock

Game #2 28 May 2013; 20:35 EST	Werribee	113 – 28 stand alone game	Queanbeyan	Etihad Stadium match report match statistics
	5.3 (33); 6.8 (44); 9.14 (68); 16.17 (113)	match report	1.1 (7); 2.2 (14); 3.4 (22); 4.4 (28)
		Goals
	Brown 3, Maric 3, McGennis 2, Clouston 2, Sierakowski 2, Ross, Tudor, Castello, Speight		Stevens 2, Griggs, Franchi
		Bests
	Gysberts, Sierakowski, Hine, Kennedy, Brown, Maric		Conroy, Stevens, Klemke, Daniher, Atkinson, Griggs

Game #3 11 June 2013; 20:35 EST	Port Melbourne	58 – 111 stand alone game	West Adelaide	MCG match report match statistics
	3.2 (20); 5.3 (33); 7.4 (46); 9.4 (58)	match report	1.1 (7); 5.3 (33); 11.7 (73); 17.9 (111)
		Goals
	Hughes 3, Burstin 2, O'Sullivan, Valenti, Mascitti, Papaleo		Nelson 4, Beech 3, Tuck 2, Keough 2, Schott 2, Smith, Homburg, Macreadie, Fielke
		Bests
	Hughes, Rowe, Muling, Gordon, O'Sullivan		Tuck, Fielke, Macreadie, Nelson, Anderson

Gamel #4 18 June 2013; 18:35 WST	Claremont	80 – 26 stand alone game	Southport	Patersons Stadium match report match statistics
	5.3 (33); 8.4 (52); 10.5 (65); 12.8 (80)	match report	0.1 (1); 1.2 (8); 3.2 (20); 4.2 (26)
		Goals
	McGovern 3, Richardson 3, Court 2, Knott, Winmar, Davies, Swift		Pope, Kiel, Mallan, Mills
		Bests
	McGovern, Daniher, Davies, Richardson		Pope, Thynne, Kiel, Whish-Wilson

=== Semi-finals ===
Semi Final #1 9 July 2013; 20:35 EST	East Fremantle	40 – 16 stand alone game	Werribee	Patersons Stadium match report match statistics
	3.0 (18); 6.2 (38); 6.3 (39); 6.4 (40)	match report	0.3 (3); 1.3 (9); 1.3 (9); 2.4 (16)
		Goals
	Dick 2, O'Brien, Tropiano, Boyle, Lester-Smith		Tudor, McKinley
		Bests
	O’Brien, Hadley, Howlett, McGough, Tropiano		Brown, Kennedy, Sierakowski, Purton-Smith

Semi Final #2 16 July 2013; 20:35 EST	West Adelaide	43 – 26 stand alone game	Claremont	AAMI Stadium match report match statistics
	3.1 (19); 3.4 (22); 5.4 (34); 6.7 (43)	match report	1.3 (9); 3.6 (24); 3.7 (25); 3.8 (26)
		Goals
	Beech 2, Schmidt, Slattery, Nelson, Bonney		Richardson, Bradshaw
		Bests
	T.Tuck, Schmidt, Beech, Slattery, Macreadie		Murphy, Neates, Davies, Richardson

=== Grand Final ===
Grand Final 6 August 2013; 20:35 EST	East Fremantle	28 – 32 stand alone game	West Adelaide	AAMI Stadium match report
	0.3 (3); 0.4 (4); 1.10 (16); 2.16 (28)	match report	1.2 (8); 4.5 (29); 4.7 (31); 4.8 (32)
		Goals
	Hancock, Stephen		Beech 2, Silverlock, Still
		Bests
	Peake, O’Brien, Bayliss, Stephen, Dodd		Schmidt (Coles Medalist), Beech, Mangan, Silverlock, Caire
