= Frankston Park =

Australian rules football venue in Frankston, Victoria

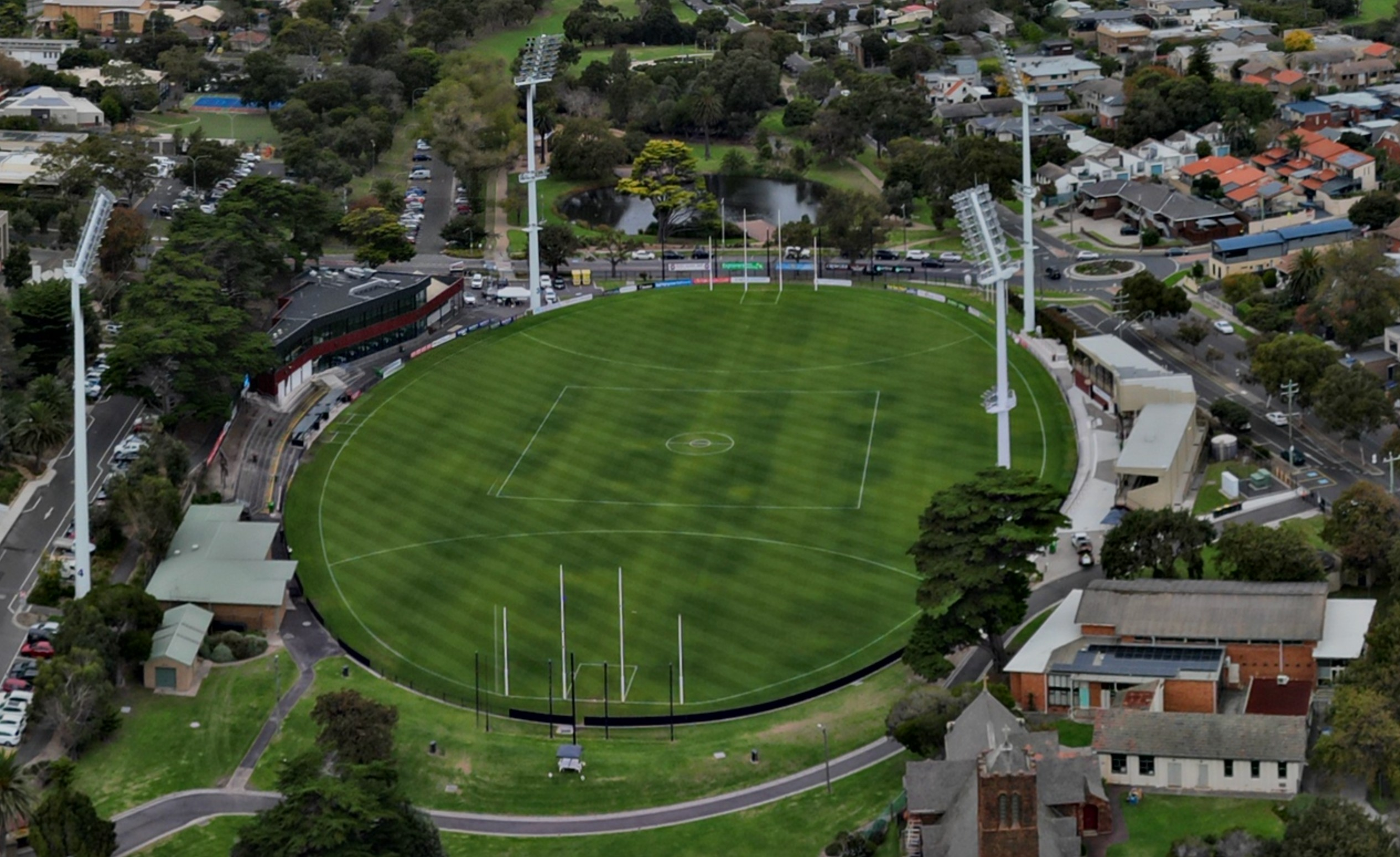
- Interactive map of Frankston Park
- Former names: Kars Street Oval; Skybus Stadium
- Location: Frankston, Victoria
- Coordinates: 38°8′52″S 145°7′13″E
- Owner: Frankston Football Club
- Capacity: 5,000 (1000 seated)
- Record attendance: 10,200 (Frankston vs Port Melbourne, 3 August 1986)
- Field size: 163 metres × 123 metres
- Public transit: High Street; Frankston Station

Tenants
- Frankston Football Club (1887–); Hawthorn Football Club (AFLW) (2022–); Melbourne Rising (NRC) (2015–2019)

Frankston Park (known under naming rights as Kinetic Stadium) is an Australian rules football venue located in the Melbourne suburb of Frankston. It is home to the Frankston Football Club, which plays in the Victorian Football League (VFL).

== History ==
Frankston Park is noted for the unusually long and narrow dimensions of its playing surface. It is also a rare example of a top municipal football ground which has, for most of its history, not been used for cricket during the summer months. In the early 1920s, the council determined that it preferred to leave the ground as a public space during summer and to not compromise the surface by installing cricket pitches. Since that time, Jubilee Park has been the district's primary cricket venue.

The grandstand at Frankston Park was the original grandstand from the first ever Australian Scout Jamboree in 1935, and was relocated to the ground shortly after. In 2005, Frankston City Council funded a A$1.2 million refurbishment of the grandstand. Following the latest refurbishment, it was renamed the "Bryan Mace Grandstand", in honour of the Frankston Football Club stalwart and general manager. The historic grandstand remained as a landmark at Frankston Park for 72 years, until it was destroyed by fire on 12 February 2008. The grandstand was subsequently reconstructed and completed in January 2011.

In 2008, the St Kilda Football Club had planned to move its primary training base from Moorabbin Oval to Frankston Park and to re-develop it into a top class training venue for the club; but these plans fell through due to high cost, and the club instead developed and moved to Belvedere Park in nearby Seaford.

A crowd of 8,500 people attended Frankston Park for the Mornington Peninsula Nepean Football League (MPNFL) grand final in 2018.

Broadcast quality floodlighting was installed at the venue in 2020, making it one of the few suburban venues suitable for VFL and AFL Women's night matches.
