= Chirnside Park (stadium) =

Australian rules football ground in Victoria

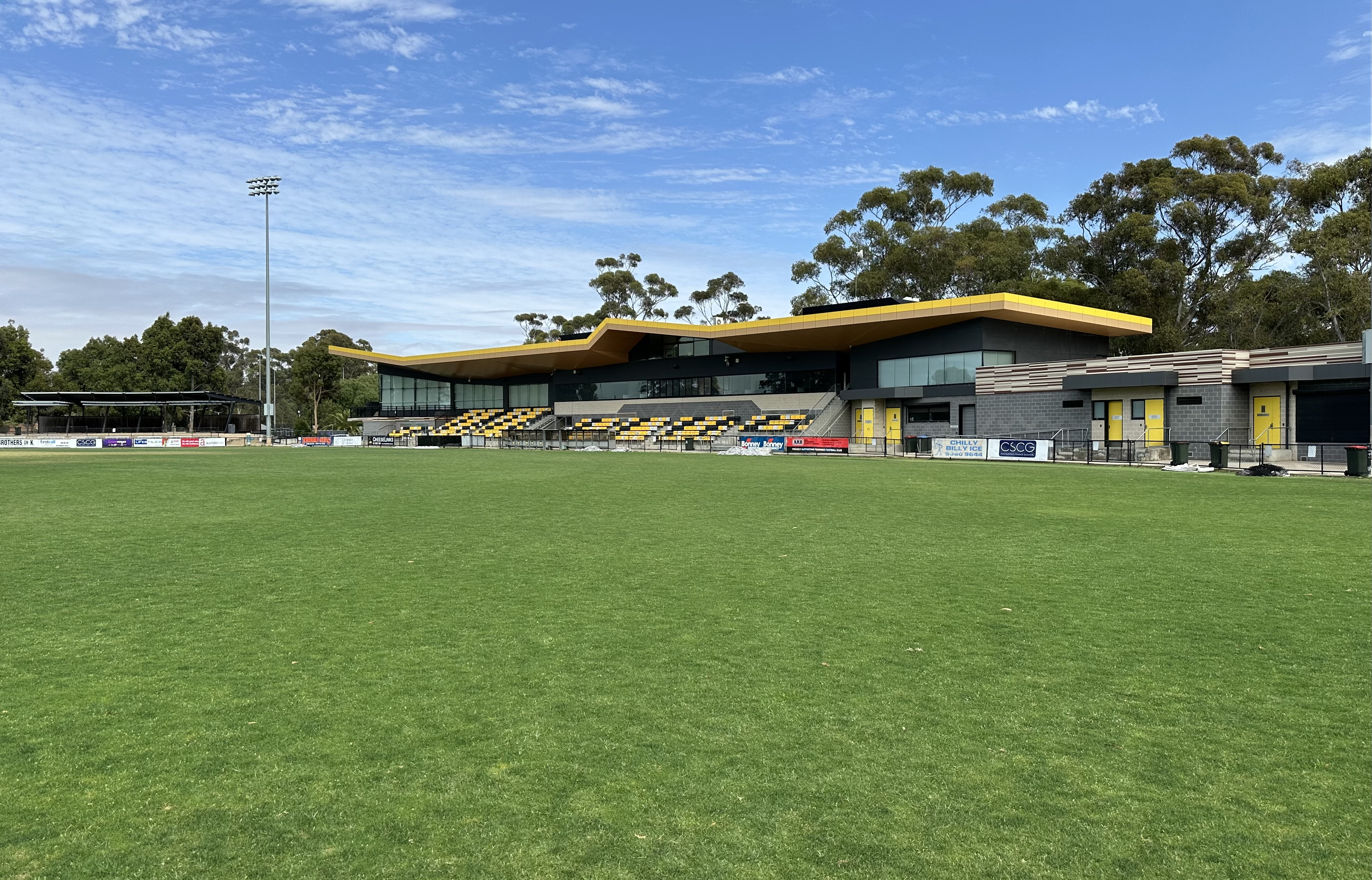
- Chirnside Park in January 2026
- Interactive map of Chirnside Park
- Location: Werribee, Victoria
- Coordinates: 37°54′17″S 144°39′11″E
- Owner: City of Wyndham
- Capacity: 8,000
- Field size: 177 metres × 125 metres

Tenant
- Werribee Football Club (VFL) (1967–present)

Chirnside Park (known under naming rights as Avalon Airport Oval) is an Australian rules football and cricket venue located in the Melbourne suburb of Werribee.

Chirnside Park is the home ground of Victorian Football League team Werribee Tigers who have played at the ground since their inception in 1965. During the 2011 VFL season, Williamstown Football Club played the majority of its home games at Chirnside Park while the Williamstown Cricket Ground was being redeveloped. Western Region Football League first division finals have been played at the venue since 2011.

Chirnside Park has a main social club building on the wing with terracing for spectators. A small wooden grandstand, believed to date to the 1910s or 1920s, is situated in the forward pocket next to it. Floodlights were installed at the ground around 2011, when night matches were first played at the ground.

In February 1967 the Polish Sports Festival held its first event at the venue, with spectator numbers reaching 3,000. It was such a success that it caused the Polish community to call Chirnside Park home for its sports festivals for the next nine years, until 1976.

The total capacity is around the 10,000-mark. In 1982, an estimated 10,000 spectators saw Werribee's first ever match against VFA powerhouse Port Melbourne, which Werribee won by one point.

The wider Chirnside Park area, outside the fenced football ground, also contains tennis courts, a public swimming pool, and the Werribee Bowling Club.
