= Frankston Football Club =

Australian rules football club in Frankston, Victoria

Names
- Full name: Frankston Football Club Incorporated
- Nickname(s): Dolphins, Phins, Dollies

2025 season
- After finals: VFL: 4th MPFNL D1: 4th MPFNL D2: DNQ
- Home-and-away season: VFL: 4th MPFNL D1: 4th MPFNL D2: 8th
- Leading goalkicker: VFL: Corey Ellison (56); MPFNL D1: Seikula Drodrolagi (17); MPFNL D2: Cassie Vandervalk (7)
- Best and fairest: VFL: Tom Blamires; MPFNL D1: Jemma Radford; MPFNL D2: Tylah St Anne

Club details
- Founded: 1887; 139 years ago
- Colours: Black White Red
- Competition: VFL: Senior men MPFNL D1: Senior women MPFNL D1 Reserves: Reserves women
- President: vacant
- Coach: VFL: Jackson Kornberg; MPFNL D1: Jason Cridland; MPFNL D1 Reserves: Greg Hilton
- Captain(s): VFL: Trent Mynott; MPFNL D1: Steph Rummel
- Premierships: VFA/VFL (1): 1978 (Div 2); MPFNLW (1): 2024 (Div 3); MPFL (7): 1937; 1938; 1939; 1941; 1949; 1952; 1961; PFA (5): 1911; 1919; 1922; 1923; 1931
- Ground: Frankston Park (5,000)

Uniforms
Home

Other information
- Official website: frankstonfc.com.au

The Frankston Football Club, nicknamed the Dolphins, is an Australian rules football club based in the Melbourne suburb of Frankston. The club was formed in 1887 and has played in the Victorian Football League (VFL), formerly the Victorian Football Association (VFA), almost continuously since 1966.

Frankston also has a senior women's team in Division 1 of the Mornington Peninsula Football Netball League (MPFNL), with a reserves women's team that will compete in the MPFNL's Division 2 in 2025.

== History ==
Frankston Football Club was the first Peninsula-based football club to be founded in 1887. Games were arranged between a group of teams across the Peninsula including Hastings and Mornington.

=== PFA ===
Frankston was one of five founding members of the Peninsula Football Association (PFA) in 1908. In the inaugural season It lost the first Grand Final to Hastings. Frankston were Premiers in 1911, 1919, 1922, 1923, and 1931.

=== MPFL ===
At the end of the 1933 season the Peninsula Football Association merged with the Peninsula District Football Association to form the Mornington Peninsula Football League (MPFL). Frankston were MPFL Premiers in 1937, 1938, 1939, 1941, 1949, 1952 and 1961.

=== VFA ===
In 1966, Frankston entered the second division of the Victorian Football Association (VFA). Its departure from the MPFL was acrimonious, with the MPFL refusing on three occasions over two years to grant the club the necessary clearance. With the strong population growth and natural access to juniors from the strong local league, Frankston had been expected to quickly earn promotion and become a strong Division 1 team, a similar trajectory to that experienced by the Dandenong Football Club; but the fall-out from its bitter departure from the MPFL damaged the club's reputation among junior clubs, local players and businesses on the Mornington Peninsula, and ten years later the club was still in Division 2, having played finals only twice, and was $50,000 in debt.

It was not until 1976 that Frankston saw its first real success. The senior side finished on top of the VFA Second Division ladder but lost both its finals matches, with its reserves side won the premiership. Two years later, in 1978, Frankston won the VFA Second Division premiership, its first and to date only VFA/VFL premiership. Frankston defeated Camberwell 15.13 (103) to 13.11 (89) in front of 12,291 at Toorak Park, and full-forward John Hunter kicked 6 goals in the side 14-point win. As a result, Frankston was promoted to First Division for 1979, and stayed there for the rest of the time that the Association remained in two divisions; its off-field position also improved, with the promotion to Division 1 immediately helping it to secure $30,000 in sponsorship. In 1984 they made the Grand Final but lost by 54 points to Preston.

=== Victorian Football League ===
The mid-1990s saw a turbulent period for the VFL with many clubs disbanding and re-organising continuously, yet Frankston remained stable and competitive. Led by former Carlton premiership player David Rhys-Jones, Frankston managed to make the 1996 and 1997 VFL Grand Finals although would lose both matches. In 1999 Robert Mace was again appointed head coach, leading the club until the end of 2002.

In 2009 Frankston appointed former North Melbourne forward Shannon Grant as its senior coach. Grant replaced former Melbourne defender Brett Lovett, who spent six years as coach of the Dolphins. In 2010 Grant was replaced by Simon Goosey, former coach of Mornington Football Club and part-time Essendon Football Club recruiter. In 2015, Frankston was coached by former Box Hill Hawks assistant coach Patrick Hill, but the club finished last and was winless for the first time in its history.

After the VFL merged with the AFL reserves competition in 2000, Frankston has been unique among all VFL clubs in that it has never been involved in a reserves affiliation with an AFL team.

In the 2010s, the club began to face financial difficulties, which was exacerbated in particular by a turndown in profitability of its pokies licence. It sold off the licence, which by this time was returning a loss, in May 2016, but with debts in excess of $1 million, the club went into voluntary administration late in August 2016. The club's VFL licence was terminated the following month. The club's immediate future was saved when creditors, including the state government gaming administration, agreed to waive more than 90% of the club's debt, and the club came out of administration in late November. It had no playing presence during 2017, but after improving its viability during the year it successfully regained its licence to return to the VFL in 2018. Weak on-field performances accompanied this period of off-field struggle, and the club was winless in 2015 and did not finish outside the bottom two between 2015 and 2019. A period of relative off-field stability from the beginning of season 2020 ensued. From 2024, the on-field fortunes followed with the Club qualifying for finals and in season 2025, the club hosted its first home-final since 2008 and achieved its best season since 1997.

== Current men's squad ==
Frankston Football Club
List		Coaching staff
1 Noah Gown; 2 Lochie Reidy; 3 Taine Barlow (vc); 4 Corey Ellison; 6 George Grey (vc); 7 Tomoya Owens; 8 Harrison Jones; 9 Will Hamill; 10 Blake O'Leary; 11 Seb Quirk; 12 Trent Mynott (c); 13 Jackson Voss; 14 Darby Hipwell; 15 Tyson Milne; 16 Harrison Coe; 17 Nick Burke; 18 Joe Lloyd (vc); 19 Angus Grant; 20 Will Papley; 21 Jamie Gilchrist; 22 Bailey Lambert	24 Will Derrington; 25 Patrick Dozzi; 26 Pat Cotter; 27 Kobe Askew; 28 Ollie Moran; 29 Tarkyn O'Leary; 30 Tom Hoefert; 31 Bailey Lloyd; 32 Matthew Nelson; 33 Kade De La Rue; 34 Clayton Gay; 35 Henry Berenger; 36 Lachie Sharp; 37 Jacob Noble; 38 Max Gregory; 39 Deng Andrew; 40 Kade Foster; 41 Lachlan Commons; 42 Ben Fergusson; 43 Henry Hayes; 48 Max Williames	Head coach: Jackson Kornberg; Assistant coaches: Damien Keeping (GM - Football/Head of Development); Tim McGibney (Senior Assistant); Paddy Swain (Assistant); Rich Morrow (Assistant); Matt Bateman (Development Coach); Lachlan Kerr (Analyst); Peter Cranwell (Team Manager); Legend: (c) Captain(s); (vc) Vice-captain(s)

== Women's team ==
Frankston fields a senior women's team and reserve women's team in Division 1 of the Mornington Peninsula Football Netball League women's competition.

== Club song ==
The club song is named "Join In the Chorus", sung to the tune of "A Wee Donch en Doris", which is also the club name and basis for the North Melbourne/Sunbury and Sandringham club songs.

== Frankston Park ==
Frankston Park is the home ground of the Dolphins. The ground has a capacity of 5,000 and included a 1,000 seat grandstand. The Frankston Football Club has a fully licensed social club overlooking the oval, capable of seating up to 250 people.

On the morning of 13 February 2008 the Frankston Football Club's historic grandstand, named after stalwart Bryan Mace, was destroyed by fire. This grandstand had been there since the early 1930s and was an icon of the local community. It was originally built for the parade grounds of Australia's first World Scout Jamboree. Damage to the grandstand was estimated at over $1million. The rebuilding of the grandstand was completed in late 2010.

In 2015, the club expanded its social rooms and function centre, allowing 370 patrons downstairs and a further 220 seated patrons upstairs. Funding was provided by the Victorian State Government, the AFL, AFL Victoria and Frankston City Council.

== Honours ==
Premierships
Competition	Level	Wins	Years won
Victorian Football League	Division 1	0	Nil
Victorian Football League	Division 2	1	1978
Mornington Peninsula Football Netball League Women	Division 1	0	Nil
Mornington Peninsula Football Netball League Women	Division 3	1	2024
VFA/VFL Reserves	Division 1	3	1989, 1992, 1997
VFA/VFL Reserves	Division 2	1	1976
VFA/VFL Thirds	Division 1	1	1991
VFA/VFL Thirds	Division 2	1	1970
Peninsula Football Association	Seniors	5	1911, 1919, 1922, 1923, 1931
Mornington Peninsula Football League	Seniors	7	1937, 1938, 1939, 1941, 1949, 1952, 1961
Finishing positions
Victorian Football League (Division 1)	Minor premiership	2	1996, 1997
Victorian Football League (Division 1)	Grand Finalists	3	1984, 1996, 1997
Victorian Football League (Division 1)	Wooden spoons	6	2010, 2011, 2012, 2015, 2016, 2019

== VFA/VFL club records ==
Highest score	36.18 (234) v Waverley, Round 18, 1983, Frankston Park
Lowest score	1.4 (10) v Collingwood, Round 20, 2018, Victoria Park
Greatest winning margin	181 points v Coburg, Round 15, 1993, Frankston Park
Greatest losing margin	186 points v Coburg, Round 12, 1974, Coburg City Oval
Lowest winning score	4.17 (41) v North Ballarat 2.3 (15), Round 13, 1996, Eureka Stadium
Highest losing score	20.28 (148) v Caulfield 24.17 (161), Round 15, 1979, Frankston Park

== Australian Football League players ==
The following players have played at least one game in the Australian Football League after being drafted or signed from the Frankston Football Club:

- Matthew Boyd – drafted by Western Bulldogs in 2001
- Ryan Ferguson – drafted by Melbourne in 2002
- Chris Bryan – drafted by Carlton in 2004
- Aaron Edwards – drafted by North Melbourne in 2006
- Marcus Marigliani – drafted by Essendon in 2009
- Michael Hibberd – drafted by Essendon in 2010
- Tory Dickson – drafted by Western Bulldogs in 2011
- James Magner – drafted by Melbourne in 2011
- Mark Baguley – drafted by the Essendon in 2011
- Dylan Van Unen – drafted by Essendon in 2012
- Leigh Osborne – drafted by Gold Coast Suns in 2012
- Kyle Martin – drafted by Collingwood in 2012
- Sam Lloyd – drafted by Richmond in 2013
- Nic Newman – drafted by Sydney Swans in 2014
- Ben Cavarra – drafted by Western Bulldogs in 2018
- Liam Reidy – drafted by Fremantle in 2023
- Tom Blamires – signed by North Melbourne in 2026

== J. J. Liston Trophy winners ==
- 1984 – Peter Geddes
- 1999 – John Georgiou
- 2006 – Aaron Edwards
