= 1962 VFA season =

81st Victorian Football Association season

Division 1
- Teams: 10
- Premiers: Sandringham; 2nd D1 premiership
- Minor premiers: Moorabbin; 2nd D1 minor premiership

Division 2
- Teams: 8
- Premiers: Dandenong; 1st D2 premiership
- Minor premiers: Preston; 1st D2 minor premiership

The 1962 VFA season was the 81st season of the top division of the Victorian Football Association (VFA), an Australian rules football competition played in the state of Victoria, and the second season of its second division.

The Division 1 premiership was won by the Sandringham Football Club, after it came from behind to defeat Moorabbin in the Grand Final on 29 September by one point; it was Sandringham's second VFA premiership. The Division 2 premiership was won by Dandenong; it was the club's first premiership in either division.

== Association membership ==
=== Amalgamation between Brighton and South Caulfield ===
On 24 October 1961, the struggling Brighton Football Club announced that, for the second time in less than a year, it would consider withdrawing from the Association. The club had won six wooden spoons in the last ten seasons, it was struggling to attract enough players to field a team, or enough administrators to run the club, and its support from locals was low – not helped by improved performances from neighbouring VFL club St Kilda, which itself was usually a cellar-dweller. At a public meeting on 2 November, voting members agreed unanimously to continue operating, but the club had encountered a new problem in the interim – on 1 November, the management of the club's home ground Elsternwick Park, either put off by Brighton's uncertain future or simply seeking greater return on the venue it had invested significant money to upgrade during 1961, called for tenders for winter occupancy of the ground. Brighton put forward its usual offers of £200 for alternate weekends or £300 for the entire winter,^{Note 1} but on 15 December 1961 the ground management leased the ground for the full winter to the highest bidder, the Victorian Amateur Soccer Association, for £750.

Without a ground that met Association standards, Brighton faced expulsion from the Association; and, the Association and A.N.F.C. were both concerned that the high quality and recently upgraded venue had been secured by the rival code; the three bodies worked together to attempt to resecure Elsternwick Park for Brighton, including an appeal to the state Minister for Lands, but all avenues were unsuccessful. Brighton then sought to move to Brighton Beach Oval, which had been its home ground until 1926, but an appeal to the Brighton Council to erect the fence to bring it up to Association standards was rejected by the mayor's casting vote. It was now less than a month until the season began, and with no home ground, nor enough players to fill a single team, the club announced on 15 March that it would withdraw from the Association. There were no suitable senior clubs willing and able to replace Brighton, and a proposal from Sandringham that it field its seconds team in the Division 2 firsts appeared to be the only chance for a short-notice replacement to keep the Association at eighteen teams.

On 29 March, Brighton suddenly announced it had amalgamated with the nearby South Caulfield Football Club from the Federal District League, to form a club known as Brighton-Caulfield, following two weeks of secret negotiations between the clubs and facilitated by the VFA administration, which keen not to lose its eighteenth team. South Caulfield was the Federal League's bottom team, and it believed that its competitiveness in the Federal League was limited by its close proximity to two other strong teams; in fact, the Federal League administration had believed that the club was at risk of folding. South Caulfield had a home ground at Princes Park on Hawthorn Rd which, while primitive, was fenced and met Association standards; and it had enough players to field teams in four grades – both of which Brighton lacked. The negotiations were carried out secretly, and the Federal League was entirely surprised when the amalgamation was announced.

As a result of the amalgamation, the Association remained at eighteen clubs for 1962.

=== Threat to Preston ===
The Preston Football Club also faced a potential grounds-related threat to its viability during the 1961/62 offseason. The VFL's Fitzroy Football Club was on poor terms with the Fitzroy Cricket Club, co-tenants and ground managers of the Brunswick Street Oval. The Fitzroy Football Club decided that it wanted to move to Preston, and after some preliminary but unsuccessful negotiations with the Preston Football Club, it made a request directly to the Preston Council for a 40-year lease of the Preston Football Ground, starting from the end of 1962. The Preston Council decided that the lease could be granted only if the two football clubs came to agreeable terms, and the Preston Football Club insisted that Fitzroy would need to rebrand itself as Preston if it made the move. The two football clubs did not come to an agreement, and Fitzroy remained at the Brunswick Street Oval.

== Division 1 ==
The Division 1 home-and-home season was played over 18 rounds, a reduction from the 22 rounds played in 1961. The top four then contested the finals under the Page–McIntyre system.

=== Ladder ===
1962 VFA Division 1 ladder
Pos	Team	Pld	W	L	D	PF	PA	PP	Pts
1	Moorabbin	18	14	4	0	1664	1182	140.8	56
2	Sandringham (P)	18	13	4	1	1872	1435	130.5	54
3	Williamstown	18	12	5	1	1515	1355	111.8	50
4	Coburg	18	12	6	0	1695	1290	131.4	48
5	Oakleigh	18	12	6	0	1508	1308	115.3	48
6	Yarraville	18	9	9	0	1437	1376	104.4	36
7	Port Melbourne	18	7	11	0	1363	1558	87.5	28
8	Brunswick	18	7	11	0	1308	1542	84.8	28
9	Northcote	18	2	16	0	1063	1785	59.6	8
10	Mordialloc	18	1	17	0	1096	1681	65.2	4

Rules for classification: 1) points; 2) percentage; 3) number of points for.
(P) Premiers

=== Finals ===
	Semi-finals
Saturday, 8 September	Williamstown 10.11 (71)	def. by	Coburg 11.12 (78)	St Kilda Cricket Ground (crowd: 9,000)
Saturday, 15 September	Moorabbin 14.15 (99)	def.	Sandringham 9.9 (63)	St Kilda Cricket Ground (crowd: 10,000)

	Preliminary Final
Saturday, 22 September	Sandringham 13.16 (94)	def.	Coburg 10.11 (71)	St Kilda Cricket Ground (crowd: 9,500)

=== Grand Final ===
In a famous Grand Final, Sandringham staged a remarkable final quarter comeback to defeat Moorabbin by one point and claim the 1962 premiership. After a relatively even first half, Moorabbin took control of the game in a rough third quarter, kicking five goals to no score to open up a 44-point lead at three-quarter time. Kicking with only a slight breeze, Sandringham dominated the opening of the final quarter, and after fifteen minutes had kicked 6.3 to no score to trail by only five points. With five minutes remaining, O'Toole kicked a goal to put Sandringham ahead by a point; and from the ensuing centre bounce, ruckman Des Kennedy took the ball straight out of the ruck, took three steps and goaled from near the centre of the ground to give Sandringham a seven-point lead. Moorabbin attacked hard throughout the final five minutes, and Ron Kee goaled to bring the margin back to one point, before time expired.

It was a particularly bad day for Moorabbin, as its seconds team also lost its Grand Final by one point in the curtain-raiser, after leading by as much as 20 points, and after Coburg kicked two goals during time-on in the final quarter.

1962 VFA Division 1 Grand Final
Saturday, 29 September	Moorabbin	def. by	Sandringham	St Kilda Cricket Ground (crowd: 11,000)
3.6 (24); 7.10 (52); 12.15 (87); 13.15 (93)	Q1; Q2; Q3; Final	3.4 (22); 6.7 (43); 6.7 (43); 14.10 (94)	Umpires: Allen
Whalebone 5, Papley 3, Kee 2, Christie, Fox, W. Kupsch	Goals	Strachan 4, Bryan 2, Dawson 2, Kennedy 2, Murray 2, O'Toole 2
Gilder (ankle)	Injuries	Burke (ankle)
Fox, for striking Sheeran in the second quarter	Reports	Sheeran, for striking Fox in the second quarter

=== Awards ===
- The leading goalkicker for the season was Bill Bryan (Sandringham), who kicked 73 goals during the home-and-home season, and a further six goals during finals.
- The J. J. Liston Trophy was won by Keith Burns (Sandringham), who polled 41 votes. Burns finished ahead of Len Bretherton (Northcote), who polled 37 votes, and Laurie Brindacombe (Coburg), who polled 34 votes.
- Coburg won the seconds premiership. Coburg 11.10 (76) defeated Moorabbin 11.9 (75) in the Grand Final, played as a curtain-raiser to the firsts Grand Final on 29 September.

== Division 2 ==
The Division 2 home-and-home season was played over 16 rounds, a reduction from the 18 rounds played in 1961; the top four played finals under the Page–McIntyre system. The Division 2 Grand Final was scheduled for the same weekend as the Division 1 First semi-final, with the promotion-relegation playoff scheduled for the following weekend. Division 2 finals were played at Toorak Park; the first semi-final was played on a Saturday because Box Hill was opposed to Sunday football, but all other finals were played on Sundays.

=== Ladder ===
1962 VFA Division 2 ladder
Pos	Team	Pld	W	L	D	PF	PA	PP	Pts
1	Preston	16	14	2	0	1680	1048	160.3	56
2	Dandenong (P)	16	13	3	0	1572	972	161.7	52
3	Prahran (RU)	16	9	7	0	1415	1335	106.0	36
4	Box Hill	16	9	7	0	1281	1247	102.7	36
5	Waverley	16	9	7	0	1302	1283	101.5	36
6	Camberwell	16	6	10	0	1296	1487	87.2	24
7	Sunshine	16	3	13	0	1267	1591	79.6	12
8	Brighton–Caulfield	16	1	15	0	928	1770	52.4	4

Rules for classification: 1) points; 2) percentage; 3) number of points for.
(P) Premiers

=== Finals ===
	Semi-finals
Saturday, 18 August	Prahran 11.16 (82)	def.	Box Hill 8.10 (58)	Toorak Park (crowd: 3,000)
Sunday, 26 August	Preston 11.14 (80)	def. by	Dandenong 14.12 (96)	Toorak Park (crowd: 8,000)

	Preliminary Final
Sunday, 2 September	Preston 6.16 (52)	def. by	Prahran 10.6 (66)	Toorak Park (crowd: 9,000)

1962 VFA Division 2 Grand Final
Sunday, 9 September	Dandenong	def.	Prahran	Toorak Park (crowd: 12,000)
4.3 (27); 5.12 (42); 11.17 (83); 16.24 (120)	Q1; Q2; Q3; Final	2.2 (14); 4.7 (31); 7.11 (53); 8.12 (60)	Umpires: Millen
Wright 6, T. Waters 2, Barran 2, Bell, Delanty, Little, Minotti, Pilcher, Whelow	Goals	Pearson 4, Burgess, Butler, Richards, Wishart
Delanty (shoulder), Gillingham (thigh)	Injuries	Bosch (back)
Reports	McMahon, for striking Peters in the second quarter

=== Awards ===
- The leading goalkicker for Division 2 was Ron O'Neill (Camberwell), who kicked 59 goals in the home-and-home season.
- The Division 2 Best and Fairest was won by Garry Butler (Prahran), who polled 34 votes. Ian Whitten (Camberwell) was second with 27 votes, and Doug Beasy (Box Hill) was third with 23 votes.
- Preston won the seconds premiership for the second consecutive year. Preston 11.15 (81) defeated Camberwell 5.7 (37) in the Grand Final, played as a stand-alone match on Saturday, 1 September at Box Hill City Oval.

== Promotion and relegation ==
Division 2 premier Dandenong was promoted to Division 1 for 1963, and tenth-placed Division 1 club Mordialloc was relegated to Division 2. A play-off for promotion was held between Division 2 runners-up, Prahran and ninth-placed Division 1 club Northcote; Northcote won by 77 points, and therefore held its place in Division 1 for 1963.

1962 VFA Promotion–Relegation Challenge Match
Sunday, 16 September	Northcote	def.	Prahran	Brunswick Oval (crowd: 4,000)
3.5 (23); 9.14 (68); 10.15 (75); 17.21 (123)	Q1; Q2; Q3; Final	1.2 (8); 2.3 (15); 5.9 (39); 6.10 (46)
Aghan 4, C. Langborne 3, Ousley 3, Furlong 2, Taylor 2, Adamson, Gaskett, R. Langborne	Goals	W. Gray 2, Clarke, Kerley, McCallum, Pearson

== Notable events ==
=== Interstate matches ===
The Association played one interstate match during 1962, against Tasmania in front of a near record crowd in Devonport on Queen's Birthday Monday. Williamstown's Gerry Callahan coached the team.

	1962 Interstate matches
Monday, 4 June	Tasmania 12.7 (79)	def. by	Victoria (VFA) 12.15 (87)	Devonport Oval (crowd: 20,000)

=== Other notable events ===
- Dandenong moved its home ground from the Dandenong Showgrounds to Shepley Oval.
- Sunday football continued to be popular. A total of 44 Sunday matches were played, drawing a total attendance of 238,000 (approx. 5,400 per match); by comparison, 120 Saturday matches were played, drawing a total attendance of 219,000 (approx. 1,800 per match).
- Due to a drawn preliminary final, the VFL Grand Final was played on the same day as the VFA Grand Final. The Association had considered moving its Grand Final two days earlier to Show Day holiday to avoid going up against the League, but ultimately did not. The Division 1 Grand Final crowd of only 11,000 was the lowest since 1937, and was lower than the Sunday crowd of 12,000 which attended the Division 2 Grand Final.

== Footnotes ==
1. Brighton had a unique arrangement at Elsternwick Park, which was specifically approved in the Association constitution, under which it leased the ground only on alternate weekends for its firsts team; its seconds team played instead at Brighton Beach Oval. All other clubs were required by Association rules to hold the lease for a single ground throughout the winter, on which both the firsts and the seconds played. The Association's expulsion of Prahran in 1959 was an illustration of these requirements.

== See also ==
- List of VFA/VFL premiers
