= 1937 VFA season =

1937 VFA premiership season
- Teams: 12
- Premiers: Prahran; 1st premiership
- Minor premiers: Brunswick; 3rd minor premiership

The 1937 Victorian Football Association season was the 59th season of the Australian rules football competition. The premiership was won by the Prahran Football Club, after it came from fourth on the ladder to defeat Brunswick by two points in the Grand Final on 4 September 1937. It was the club's first VFA premiership since it joined the Association in 1899.

== Premiership ==
The home-and-home season was played over sixteen matches, a reduction from the eighteen games staged in 1936, before the top four clubs contested a finals series under the Page–McIntyre system to determine the premiers for the season.

=== Ladder ===
1937 VFA ladder
Pos	Team	Pld	W	L	D	PF	PA	PP	Pts
1	Brunswick	16	12	4	0	1486	1182	125.7	48
2	Brighton	16	12	4	0	1456	1334	109.1	48
3	Yarraville	16	11	5	0	1375	1071	128.4	44
4	Prahran (P)	16	11	5	0	1557	1320	118.0	44
5	Northcote	16	10	6	0	1353	1173	115.3	40
6	Coburg	16	9	7	0	1454	1419	102.5	36
7	Sandringham	16	7	9	0	1338	1335	100.2	28
8	Camberwell	16	7	9	0	1390	1477	94.1	28
9	Port Melbourne	16	5	11	0	1161	1464	79.3	20
10	Williamstown	16	4	12	0	1177	1370	85.9	16
11	Preston	16	4	12	0	1227	1461	84.0	16
12	Oakleigh	16	4	12	0	1296	1664	77.9	16

Rules for classification: 1) points; 2) percentage; 3) number of points for.
(P) Premiers

=== Finals ===
	Semifinals
Saturday, 7 August	Yarraville 12.12 (84)	drew with	Prahran 11.18 (84)	Toorak Park (crowd: 8,000)
Saturday, 14 August	Brunswick 13.17 (95)	def.	Brighton 6.9 (45)	Toorak Park (crowd: 8,000)
Saturday, 21 August	Yarraville 14.8 (92)	def. by	Prahran 18.12 (120)	Toorak Park (crowd: 6,000)

	Preliminary Final
Saturday, 28 August	Brighton 9.9 (63)	def. by	Prahran 14.12 (96)	Toorak Park (crowd: 7,000)

1937 VFA Grand Final
Saturday, 4 September	Brunswick	def. by	Prahran	Toorak Park (crowd: 9,000)
3.3 (21); 6.6 (42); 10.13 (73); 11.17 (83)	Q1; Q2; Q3; Final	1.3 (9); 3.6 (24); 9.9 (63); 12.13 (85)
Crawford 3, McInnes 3, Gardner 2, Bailey, Dowling, McKay	Goals	Hawkins 6, Anderson 2, Thompson 2, Fleming, White
Turner, for striking Wiltshire in the second quarter Gardner, for striking Wiltshire in the third quarter Kanngieser, for striking Gravell in the third quarter	Reports	Wiltshire, for striking Turner in the second quarter Wiltshire, for striking Gardner in the third quarter Gravell, for kicking Kanngeiser in the third quarter

== Awards ==
- Geoff McInnes (Brunswick) was the leading goalkicker for the season; he kicked 78 goals in the home-and-home season and 86 goals overall.
- In the parallel Association best and fairest awards:
  - Neville Huggins (Williamstown) won the Recorder Cup, polling six votes. Jack Lowry (Prahran), L. Wedgwood (Yarraville) and J. Holden (Prahran) finished equal second with three votes apiece.
  - The Association Medal was won jointly by Neville Huggins (Williamstown) and Jack Lowry (Prahran), who tied with 24 votes apiece. It was Huggins' second Association Medal in a row. G. Weber (Brighton) and E. Watson (Oakleigh) finished equal-third with 23 votes.
- Coburg won the seconds premiership. Coburg 9.11 (65) defeated Brunswick 4.13 (37) in the Grand Final on Saturday 28 August at Preston.

== See also ==
- List of VFA/VFL Premiers
