= 1981 VFA season =

1981 VFA Premiership Season
- Teams: 20

Division 1
- Teams: 10
- Premiers: Port Melbourne (14th premiership)
- Minor premiers: Port Melbourne (13th minor premiership)

Division 2
- Teams: 10
- Premiers: Camberwell (2nd D2 premiership)
- Minor premiers: Camberwell (2nd D2 minor premiership)

The 1981 Victorian Football Association season was the 100th season of the top division of the Australian rules football competition, and the 21st season of second division competition. The Division 1 premiership was won by the Port Melbourne Football Club, after it defeated Preston in the Grand Final on 20 September by 113 points; it was Port Melbourne's 14th Division 1 premiership, the second of three premierships won in a row between 1980 and 1982, and the fifth of six premierships won in nine seasons from 1974 until 1982. The Division 2 premiership was won by Camberwell; it was the club's second Division 2 premiership, and it was the last premiership ever won by the club.

== Rule changes ==
After trialling it during the 1980 finals series, two field umpires were used during all Division 1 matches in 1981. Division 2 continued to be officiated by a single field umpire during the home-and-away season, and by two field umpires during finals.

One consequence of this was that the Liston Trophy voting procedure changed. Previously, in both the Liston Trophy and Field Medal, the field umpire and each of the two goal umpires had independently awarded votes to the best two players on the ground on a 2–1 basis. This year in Division 1, each field umpire but neither of the goal umpires awarded Liston Trophy votes on the same 2–1 basis as before; in Division 2, Field Medal voting procedures were unchanged.

== Division 1 ==
The Division 1 home-and-away season was played over 18 rounds; the top four then contested the finals under the Page–McIntyre system. The finals were played at the Junction Oval.

=== Ladder ===
1981 VFA Division 1 Ladder
Pos	Team	Pld	W	L	D	PF	PA	PP	Pts
1	Port Melbourne (P)	18	16	2	0	2833	1751	161.8	64
2	Preston	18	12	6	0	2373	1804	131.5	48
3	Sandringham	18	10	8	0	1954	1927	101.4	40
4	Frankston	18	10	8	0	2005	2089	96.0	40
5	Prahran	18	10	8	0	2032	2159	94.1	40
6	Coburg	18	9	9	0	2172	1832	118.6	36
7	Geelong West	18	8	10	0	1870	2201	85.0	32
8	Dandenong	18	7	11	0	1878	2085	90.1	28
9	Caulfield	18	5	13	0	2035	2451	83.0	20
10	Brunswick	18	3	15	0	1607	2430	66.1	12

Rules for classification: 1) points; 2) percentage; 3) number of points for.
(P) Premiers

=== Finals ===
	Semi-finals
Sunday, 30 August	Sandringham 14.16 (100)	def.	Frankston 13.5 (83)	Junction Oval (crowd: 7,785)
Sunday, 6 September	Port Melbourne 22.25 (157)	def.	Preston 12.14 (86)	Junction Oval (crowd: 10,021)

	Preliminary Final
Sunday, 13 September	Preston 28.7 (175)	def.	Sandringham 26.12 (168)	Junction Oval (crowd: 7,171)

1981 VFA Division 1 Grand Final
Sunday, 20 September	Port Melbourne	def.	Preston	Junction Oval (crowd: 20,180)
6.6 (42); 9.9 (63); 19.14 (128); 32.19 (211)	Q1; Q2; Q3; Final	2.1 (13); 9.4 (58); 11.8 (74); 15.8 (98)	Umpires: Roy Groom, Barry Fitzpatrick
Cook 8, Anderson 5, Jim Christou 4, O'Riley 4, Evans 3, Goss 3, Davies 2, Ebeyer 2, Swan	Goals	Halas 5, Box 2, Boden, Brine, Cooper, Heard, McEwan, McGaw, Marks, Vann

=== Awards ===
- The leading goalkicker for the season was Rex Hunt (Sandringham), who kicked 95 goals during the home-and-away season and 110 goals overall.
- The J. J. Liston Trophy was won by Vic Aanensen (Port Melbourne), who polled 24 votes; it was Aanensen's second Liston Trophy in three seasons. Aanensen finished ahead of Tony West (Brunswick), who polled 23 votes, and Brian Jones (Frankston), who polled 17 votes.
- Dandenong won the seconds premiership. Dandenong 16.16 (112) defeated Port Melbourne 15.14 (104) in the Grand Final, played as a curtain-raiser to the seniors Grand Final on 20 September.

== Division 2 ==
The Division 2 home-and-away season was played over eighteen rounds; the top four then contested the finals under the Page–McIntyre system; all finals were played on Sundays at Toorak Park.

=== Ladder ===
1981 VFA Division 2 Ladder
Pos	Team	Pld	W	L	D	PF	PA	PP	Pts
1	Camberwell (P)	18	14	4	0	2417	1504	160.7	56
2	Waverley	18	13	5	0	2444	1423	171.7	52
3	Mordialloc	18	13	5	0	2139	1504	142.2	52
4	Werribee	18	12	5	1	2209	1624	136.0	50
5	Oakleigh	18	11	7	0	2271	1726	131.6	44
6	Northcote	18	11	7	0	2040	1738	117.4	44
7	Williamstown	18	9	8	1	2114	2030	104.1	38
8	Yarraville	18	4	14	0	1688	2359	71.6	16
9	Box Hill	18	2	16	0	1568	2777	56.5	8
10	Sunshine	18	0	18	0	1136	3341	34.0	0

Rules for classification: 1) points; 2) percentage; 3) number of points for.
(P) Premiers

=== Finals ===
	Semi-finals
Sunday, 16 August	Mordialloc 16.20 (116)	def.	Werribee 13.8 (86)	Toorak Park (crowd: 3,580)
Sunday, 23 August	Camberwell 30.15 (195)	def.	Waverley 13.13 (91)	Toorak Park (crowd: 5,298)

	Preliminary Final
Sunday, 30 August	Waverley 20.15 (135)	def.	Mordialloc 13.16 (94)	Toorak Park (crowd: 2,700)

1981 VFA Division 2 Grand Final
Sunday, 6 September	Camberwell	def.	Waverley	Toorak Park (crowd: 8,250)
2.3 (15); 7.10 (52); 12.11 (83); 15.16 (106)	Q1; Q2; Q3; Final	1.3 (9); 3.4 (22); 8.7 (55); 11.8 (74)	Umpires: Bill Torney, Frank Vergona
Stevenson 5, Hammond 4, Cook, Chamberlain, Davidson, Hirst, Neilson, Oliver	Goals	Angelis 2, Davies 2, Styles 2, Venville 2, Beddoe, Brick, Plummer

=== Awards ===
- The leading goalkicker for the Division 2 was Peter Stevenson (Camberwell), who kicked 106 goals in the home-and-away season and 119 goals overall.
- The J. Field Medal was won by Brian Matthey (Oakleigh), who polled 36 votes. Matthey finished ahead of Neil Peart (Northcote), who polled 33 votes, and Adrian McClure (Waverley), who polled 29 votes.
- Camberwell won the seconds premiership. Camberwell 18.12 (120) defeated Oakleigh 17.14 (116) in the Grand Final, played as a curtain-raiser to the senior Grand Final on 6 September.

== Notable events ==
=== Interleague matches ===
For the first time, the Association named separate representative teams for Division 1 and Division 2. The Division 1 team played a match against the Greater Northern Football League, which was a short-lived amalgamation between the Launceston-based Northern Tasmanian Football Association and the north-west coastal North Western Football Union. Division 2 played against the South Australian Football Association, a second-tier senior competition which had been formed in Adelaide in 1978.

	1981 Interleague Matches
Sunday, 7 June	G.N.F.L. 15.20 (110)	def.	V.F.A. First Division 15.10 (100)	Devonport Oval
Sunday, 12 July	S.A.F.A. 6.3 (39)	def. by	V.F.A. Second Division 6.8 (44)	Thebarton Oval

=== Other notable events ===
- Former Frankston president Alan Wickes became president of the Association at the annual general meeting in March 1981, challenging and defeating Cr Alex Gillon by a majority of 26–15. Gillon had served as president of the Association for 27 years since his election in 1954, and it was the first time since his election that anybody had opposed him for the office. Wickes, like Gillon, was determined to prevent the Victorian Football League from playing football on Sundays in Victoria, but said he believed the Association had not done enough in recent years under Gillon to justify the state government's continuing support on the matter.
- On 5 April, the first round of Division 2 matches for the season, Waverley 52.31 (343) defeated Sunshine 8.5 (53). Waverley's score set a new record for the highest score in Association history, breaking the previous record of 43.29 (287) set by Port Melbourne in 1941. Waverley full-forward Paul Angelis kicked 23 goals in the match, the highest by any player since George Gough (Northcote) kicked 25 goals in a match in 1924.
- Geelong West's financial position deteriorated dramatically in the lead-up to the 1981 season, and early in the year a number of high-profile senior players – including full-forward Joe Radojevic and former Association representative players Tony Gilmore, Ivan Russell and Seve Woolfe – went on strike seeking payments owed from 1980. The club was able to get itself out of immediate financial hardship and end the strike during the year.
- On 12 May, Caulfield rover Mark Crocker was suspended until the start of the 1983 season for spitting in field umpire Ray Groom's face. Crocker maintained that he had not spit at Groom, and merely made a noise with his lips; he was still appealing the suspension as late as the beginning of the 1982 season, but the full suspension was upheld.
- On 21 June, Fred Cook (Port Melbourne) kicked his 934th career senior Association goal, passing Bob Bonnett (Port Melbourne, 933 goals) to become the leading goalkicker in Association history. Cook still holds this title as of 2023. The record-breaking goal was witnessed by 12,000 fans, the Association's highest home-and-away crowd since the mid 1970s.
- In a high-scoring and remarkable Division 1 preliminary final, Preston 28.7 (175) defeated Sandringham 26.12 (168). Preston had led the game by 65 points after twelve minutes of the third quarter, but Sandringham fought back from this huge deficit – helped in large part by Rex Hunt, who kicked seven goals in the final quarter – and took the lead late in the final quarter, before Preston steadied to win by seven points. Preston was helped by its goal-kicking accuracy, kicking 13.0 after half time. Sandringham's score is one of the highest losing scores, in a final or otherwise, in top level senior football.
- Despite leading by only five points at half-time, Port Melbourne recorded the highest ever score and winning margin in a Division 1 Grand Final, 32.19 (211) and 113 points respectively.

== See also ==
- List of VFA/VFL premiers
