= 1954 VFA season =

1954 VFA premiership season
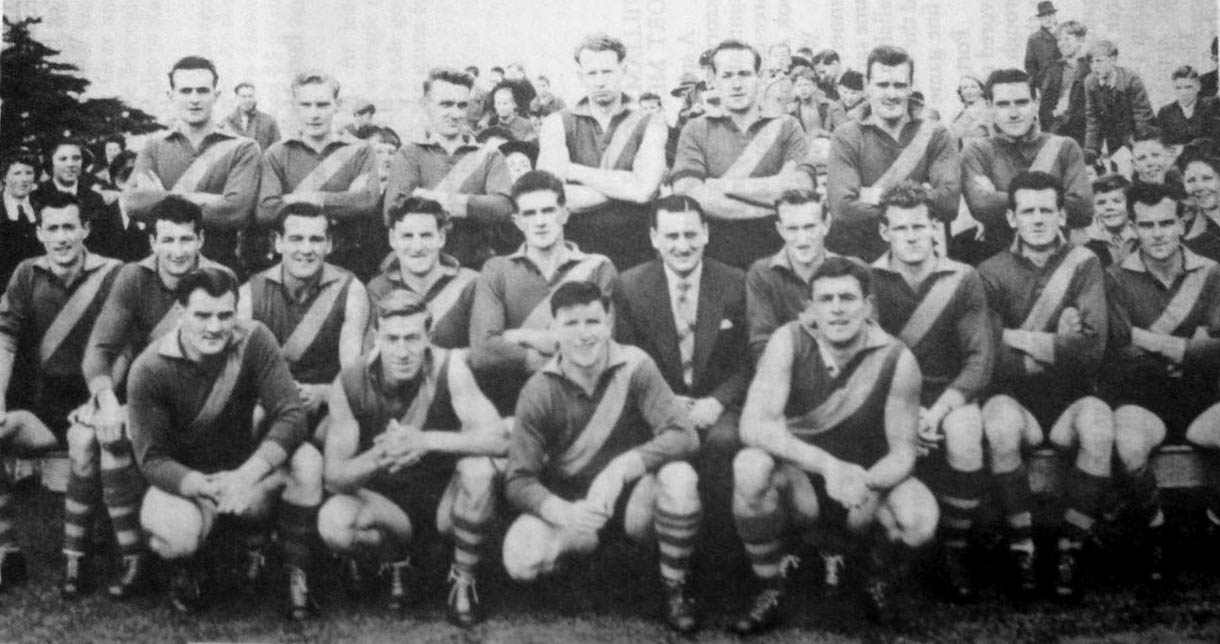
- Williamstown FC, premiers
- Teams: 14
- Premiers: Williamstown; 6th premiership
- Minor premiers: Port Melbourne; 6th minor premiership

The 1954 Victorian Football Association season was the 73rd season of the Australian rules football competition. The premiership was won by the Williamstown Football Club, after it defeated Port Melbourne by 32 points in the Grand Final on 2 October. It was Williamstown's sixth premiership, and the first of five premierships won in six seasons from 1954 until 1959.

== Premiership ==
The home-and-home season was played over twenty matches, before the top four clubs contested a finals series under the Page–McIntyre system to determine the premiers for the season.

=== Ladder ===
1954 VFA ladder
Pos	Team	Pld	W	L	D	PF	PA	PP	Pts
1	Port Melbourne	20	17	3	0	2047	1360	150.5	68
2	Williamstown (P)	20	16	4	0	1783	1147	155.4	64
3	Moorabbin	20	13	6	1	1701	1241	137.1	54
4	Northcote	20	13	6	1	1463	1265	115.7	54
5	Preston	20	13	7	0	1659	1426	116.3	52
6	Coburg	20	12	7	1	1511	1359	111.2	50
7	Prahran	20	10	10	0	1771	1687	105.0	40
8	Box Hill	20	9	11	0	1582	1459	108.4	36
9	Oakleigh	20	8	10	2	1757	1677	104.8	36
10	Brunswick	20	9	11	0	1413	1421	99.4	36
11	Yarraville	20	9	11	0	1460	1580	92.4	36
12	Brighton	20	5	14	1	1279	1689	75.7	22
13	Camberwell	20	2	18	0	1425	2079	68.5	8
14	Sandringham	20	1	19	0	1035	2495	41.5	4

Rules for classification: 1) points; 2) percentage; 3) number of points for.
(P) Premiers

=== Finals ===
	Semifinals
Saturday, 11 September	Moorabbin 6.8 (44)	def. by	Northcote 12.18 (90)	St Kilda Cricket Ground (crowd: 16,000)
Saturday, 18 September	Port Melbourne 7.12 (54)	def.	Williamstown 5.12 (42)	St Kilda Cricket Ground (crowd: 18,000)

	Preliminary Final
Saturday, 25 September	Williamstown 17.11 (113)	def.	Northcote 10.12 (72)	St Kilda Cricket Ground (crowd: 14,500)

1954 VFA Grand Final
Saturday, 2 October	Port Melbourne	def. by	Williamstown	St Kilda Cricket Ground (crowd: 30,000)
0.1 (1); 4.3 (27); 5.4 (34); 7.12 (54)	Q1; Q2; Q3; Final	4.7 (31); 6.9 (45); 10.16 (76); 11.20 (86)	Umpires: Jack Irving
Bonnett 3, McDonald, Owens, Walsh, Wharton	Goals	Alford 3, Simpson 3, Fisher 2, Anderson, Kent, Linton
Kelsey (cartilage), Stone (knee)	Injuries	Linton (concussion)

== Awards ==
- The leading goalkicker for the season was Peter Schofield (Moorabbin), who kicked 95 goals for the home-and-home season and 96 goals overall. Schofield sealed the title in Moorabbin's final home-and-home match for the season against Sandringham, in which he kicked 22 goals, including all sixteen of Moorabbin's second-half goals.
- The J. J. Liston Trophy was won by Ted Turner (Brighton), who polled 39 votes. Eric Simpson (Williamstown) was second with 31 votes; and George Gerry Collins (Oakleigh) was third with 31 votes, but behind Simpson on a countback.
- Moorabbin won the seconds premiership. Moorabbin 11.10 (76) defeated Williamstown 10.8 (68) in the Grand Final, played as a curtain raiser to the firsts Grand Final on 2 October.

== Notable events ==
- Former Brunswick player and delegate Alec Gillon became president of the Association at the annual general meeting in February 1954, challenging and defeating Lewis Page, who had served as president since 1951. Gillon went on to become the longest serving president of the Association, serving until 1981.
- Prior to the season, two soccer clubs attempted to gain partial occupancy of Association grounds. The Jugoslav United Soccer Team tendered an offer of £800 to the City of Prahran for the use of Toorak Park on alternate weekends during the season, a move which would have left the Prahran Football Club – which paid only £25 in rent for the year – without a venue for its seconds team to use; but the council rejected J.U.S.T's offer, citing its desire to remain loyal to Prahran as the reason. However, the Brighton Soccer Club was successful in securing a lease for alternate weekends at Elsternwick Park, sharing the venue with Brighton; in Brighton's case, the club's seconds already played at a different venue – Brighton Beach Oval – and it was Brighton's existing co-tenant, the Elsternwick Football Club from the Victorian Amateur Football Association, which was evicted as a result. It was the first time an Association club had been forced to share its ground with a club from a rival code, and it re-established grounds control as a major issue within the Association – ultimately escalating to the events of 1959, when the Association suspended Prahran after the council leased Toorak Park to the Victorian Rugby Union on alternate weekends.
- Despite having played as an amateur team since mid-1953 due to financial hardships, Northcote managed to reach the final four.

== See also ==
- List of VFA/VFL Premiers
