= 1966 VFA season =

Division 1
- Teams: 10
- Premiers: Port Melbourne; 9th D1 premiership
- Minor premiers: Port Melbourne; 8th D1 minor premiership

Division 2
- Teams: 10
- Premiers: Prahran; 1st D2 premiership
- Minor premiers: Northcote; 2nd D2 minor premiership

The 1966 Victorian Football Association season was the 85th season of the top division of the Australian rules football competition, and the sixth season of its second division. The Division 1 premiership was won by the Port Melbourne Football Club, after it defeated Waverley in the Grand Final on 25 September by 43 points; it was Port Melbourne's ninth premiership. The Division 2 premiership was won by Prahran.

== Association membership ==
In July 1965, the Frankston Football Club was admitted to Division 2 of the Association for the 1966 season. The Association had been in favour of admitting Frankston for 1965, but the club failed to get a clearance from the Mornington Peninsula Football League. It was not until its third appeal for a clearance that the MPFL allowed Frankston to transfer.

Frankston's admission brought the Association to a then-record twenty clubs. It was the end of a ten-year expansion plan which the Association had first announced in 1956 to increase the size of the competition from fourteen clubs to twenty. It was the last change to the Association membership until 1982.

=== Grounds ===
The following ground changes occurred in 1966:

- Coburg returned to Coburg Oval, after having shared North Port Oval with Port Melbourne during 1965 due to the Victorian Football League's North Melbourne Football Club having moved to Coburg.
- Sunshine moved from its original home at Selwyn Park, Albion to the newly developed Skinner Reserve, Braybrook. The City of Sunshine had built the new venue for the club after it leased Selwyn Park to the George Cross soccer club.
- Sandringham moved its home base to the St Kilda Cricket Ground for the 1966 season. The arrangement lasted only one year.
- New club Frankston played at Frankston Oval.
- The Division 1 finals returned to the St Kilda Cricket Ground, after having been played at North Port Oval for the previous three seasons.

== Division 1 ==
The Division 1 home-and-home season was played over 18 rounds; the top four then contested the finals under the Page–McIntyre system.

=== Ladder ===
1966 VFA Division 1 Ladder
Pos	Team	Pld	W	L	D	PF	PA	PP	Pts
1	Port Melbourne (P)	18	15	3	0	1543	1139	135.5	60
2	Waverley	18	13	5	0	1660	1283	129.4	52
3	Yarraville	18	12	6	0	1605	1373	116.9	48
4	Preston	18	12	6	0	1500	1405	106.8	48
5	Sandringham	18	10	8	0	1632	1397	116.8	40
6	Williamstown	18	9	9	0	1265	1337	94.6	36
7	Brunswick	18	8	10	0	1400	1480	94.6	32
8	Dandenong	18	5	13	0	1331	1561	85.3	20
9	Coburg	18	4	14	0	1226	1542	79.5	16
10	Oakleigh	18	2	16	0	1227	1872	65.5	8

Rules for classification: 1) points; 2) percentage; 3) number of points for.
(P) Premiers

=== Finals ===
	Semi-finals
Saturday, 3 September	Yarraville 12.15 (87)	def. by	Preston 13.11 (89)	St Kilda Cricket Ground (crowd: 6,000)
Saturday, 10 September	Port Melbourne 7.13 (55)	def. by	Waverley 9.9 (63)	St Kilda Cricket Ground (crowd: 7,000)

	Preliminary Final
Sunday, 18 September	Port Melbourne 16.14 (110)	def.	Preston 11.6 (72)	St Kilda Cricket Ground (crowd: 13,000)

1966 VFA Division 1 Grand Final
Sunday, 25 September	Waverley	def. by	Port Melbourne	St Kilda Cricket Ground (crowd: 25,000)
3.7 (25); 3.8 (26); 4.11 (35); 6.11 (47)	Q1; Q2; Q3; Final	2.4 (16); 7.6 (48); 8.8 (56); 13.12 (90)	Umpires: Alan O'Neill
Gallus 2, Lawson 2, MacNamee 2	Goals	Allen 3, Kerr 3, Bedford 2, Bollard, Bowen, Howell, Schmidt, Taggart
MacNamee (thigh), Rivis (calf)	Injuries	Griffiths (shoulder)
Reports	Bowen, for striking Rivis in the second quarter

=== Awards ===
- The leading goalkicker for the season was Johnny Walker (Preston), who kicked 78 goals during the home-and-home season and 84 goals overall.
- The J. J. Liston Trophy was won by Alan Poore (Waverley), who polled 39 votes. It was Poore's second consecutive Liston Trophy, and he became the first player ever to win the award twice – consecutively or otherwise – and the first to win any Association best and fairest award twice since Arthur Cutting's consecutive V.F.A. Medals in 1938 and 1939. Paul Ladds (Sandringham) was second with 27 votes, and Barry Ion (Yarraville) was third with 26 votes.
- Williamstown won the seconds premiership. Williamstown 14.14 (98) defeated Sandringham 11.9 (75) in the Grand Final, played as a stand-alone match on Saturday 24 September at Skinner Reserve before a crowd of 3,000.

== Division 2 ==
The Division 2 home-and-home season was played over eighteen rounds; the top four then contested the finals under the Page–McIntyre system. All finals were played on Sundays at Toorak Park.

=== Ladder ===
1966 VFA Division 2 Ladder
Pos	Team	Pld	W	L	D	PF	PA	PP	Pts
1	Northcote	18	13	5	0	1736	1413	122.9	52
2	Geelong West	18	12	5	1	1877	1390	135.0	50
3	Prahran (P)	18	12	6	0	1494	1325	112.8	48
4	Sunshine	18	11	7	0	1486	1421	104.6	44
5	Box Hill	18	9	7	2	1701	1464	116.2	40
6	Mordialloc	18	9	8	1	1680	1436	117.0	38
7	Frankston	18	9	9	0	1471	1580	93.1	36
8	Caulfield	18	6	11	1	1324	1678	78.9	24
9	Camberwell	18	4	14	0	1441	1926	74.8	16
10	Werribee	18	2	15	1	1256	1883	66.7	10

Rules for classification: 1) points; 2) percentage; 3) number of points for.
(P) Premiers

=== Finals ===
	Semi-finals
Sunday, 21 August	Prahran 11.15 (81)	def.	Sunshine 2.7 (19)	Toorak Park (crowd: 5,000)
Sunday, 28 August	Northcote 8.19 (67)	def. by	Geelong West 15.15 (105)	Toorak Park (crowd: 7,000)

	Preliminary Final
Sunday, 4 September	Northcote 13.12 (90)	def. by	Prahran 13.13 (91)	Toorak Park (crowd: 6,000)

1966 VFA Division 2 Grand Final
Sunday, 11 September	Geelong West	def. by	Prahran	Toorak Park (crowd: 10,000)
2.9 (21); 3.13 (31); 3.14 (32); 5.15 (45)	Q1; Q2; Q3; Final	1.0 (6); 6.4 (40); 9.9 (63); 17.12 (114)	Umpires: R. Armstrong
Brushfield, Gibbons, Salter, Stacey, Williams	Goals	Pearson 6, Bartlett 4, Butler 3, Richardson 3, Kerley

=== Awards ===
- The leading goalkicker for Division 2 was Ben Nusteling (Geelong West) who kicked 85 goals in the home-and-home season and 92 goals overall.
- The Division 2 Best and Fairest was won by Ian Williams (Geelong West), who polled 48 votes. Larry Rowe (Caulfield) was second with 27 votes, and Alex Gardiner (Box Hill) and Ben Crameri (Northcote) were equal third with 26 votes.
- Sunshine won the seconds premiership. Sunshine 12.12 (84) defeated Northcote 8.6 (54) in the Grand Final, held as a stand-alone match on Saturday 10 September at Skinner Reserve.

== Notable events ==
=== Interstate matches ===
The Association contested the 1966 Hobart Carnival during June. The team was coached by Perc Bushby (Coburg) and was captained by Keith Burns (Brunswick). The Association had a poor tournament, finishing last and losing all four matches by large margins; and, no Association players were selected in the All-Australian team.

	1966 Hobart Carnival
Thursday, 9 June	Western Australia 26.18 (174)	def.	Victoria (VFA) 5.11 (41)	North Hobart Oval (crowd: 20,047^{CR})
Saturday, 11 June	Tasmania 19.27 (141)	def.	Victoria (VFA) 7.11 (53)	North Hobart Oval (crowd: 23,764^{CR})
Monday, 13 June	Victoria (VFL) 14.17 (101)	def.	Victoria (VFA) 9.7 (61)	North Hobart Oval (crowd: 13,969^{CR})
Thursday, 16 June	South Australia 21.20 (146)	def.	Victoria (VFA) 9.11 (65)	North Hobart Oval (crowd: 10,199^{CR})

=== Other notable events ===
- Oakleigh captain-coach John Benetti was dropped from the playing team at midseason due to poor form; he immediately resigned upon being informed that the financially struggling club could not afford to pay him as a non-playing coach. Oakleigh's win–loss record was 0–9 when Benetti resigned.
- On 16 July, Yarraville 6.5 (41) defeated Dandenong 4.12 (36) after Neil Fell kicked the winning goal from a set shot in the forward pocket in the final moments of the game. Three Dandenong defenders disputed the goal umpire's call, claiming that the ball hit the post on its way through. Dandenong raised a formal protest, but it was dismissed.
- On 7 August, Box Hill played its first ever Sunday match – an away match against Northcote. Box Hill had remained opposed to Sunday football since its introduction, but the club was struggling financially and needed access to the larger crowds available on Sundays The club remained unable to play Sunday matches at home until the council permitted them in 1969.
- In the Division 1 first semi-final, Yarraville trailed Preston by 5 points at half time, before kicking eight goals to one in the third quarter to take a 39-point lead; Preston then came from behind, kicking seven goals to none in the final quarter to win by two points, with the winning goal coming seconds before the final siren.

== See also ==
- List of VFA/VFL Premiers
