= J. J. Liston Trophy =

Australian rules football award

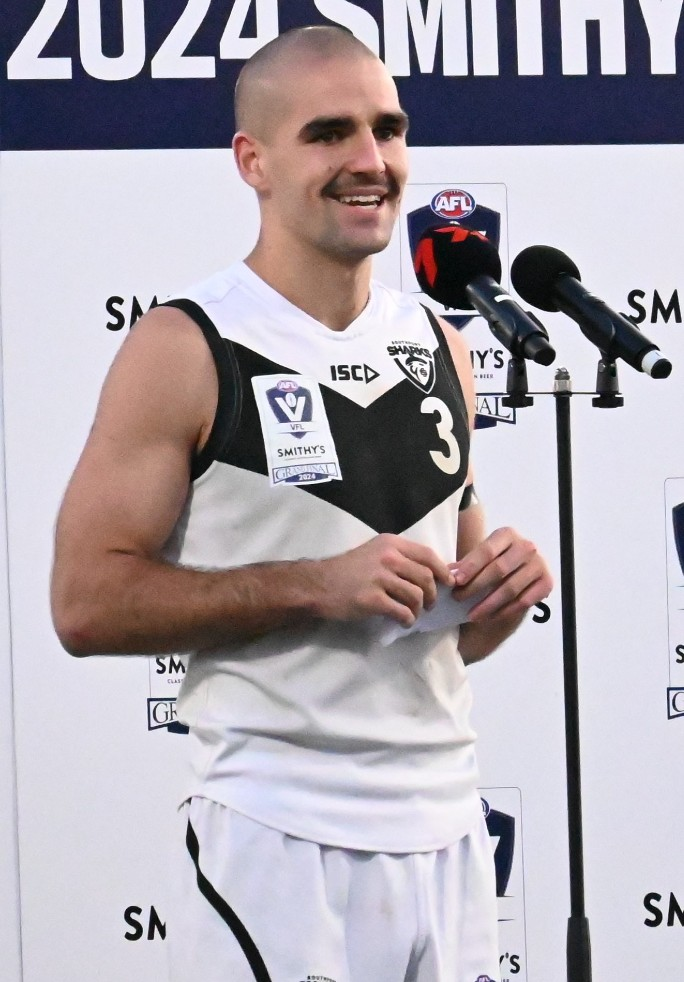
- 2025 recipient of the trophy, Jacob Dawson
- Awarded for: The fairest and best player in the Victorian Football League
- Country: Australia
- Presented by: VFL
- First award: 1945
- Final award: Ongoing
- Currently held by: Trent Mynott (Frankston) & George Stevens (Geelong), 2026

The J. J. Liston Trophy is awarded annually to the best and fairest senior player in the Victorian Football League (VFL), which was formerly known as the Victorian Football Association (VFA). It is named after J. J. Liston, who was president of the VFA from 1929 to 1944.

== History ==
The first award for the Association best and fairest player was the Woodham Cup, named after VFA Vice President and North Melbourne committeeman Alf Woodham, which was first awarded in 1923. The Woodham Cup was renamed the Recorder Cup, named after the Association's official match-day publication, in 1926. Starting from 1933, a second award, the V.F.A. Medal (or Association Medal), was awarded concurrently. From 1933 until 1939, both the Recorder Cup and the V.F.A. Medal were presented annually based on the votes of the umpires; but the two awards were given based on different voting systems.

The two best and fairest awards were combined into one in 1940, when the Association dispensed with the Recorder Cup voting system; in 1940 and 1941, both the V.F.A. Medal and the Recorder Cup were awarded as trophies to the same player based on the same set of votes.

The Association went into recess from 1942 until 1944 during World War II; upon resumption in 1945, and continuously since, the winning player has received one trophy, the J. J. Liston Trophy, named after long-term Association president and Melbourne City councillor, John James Liston, who died in 1944.

From 1961 until 1988, when the Association operated in two divisions, the Liston Trophy was awarded to the best and fairest in Division 1. A separate award, known as the J. Field Medal, was awarded for the second division.

== Voting system ==
The current voting system for the J. J. Liston Trophy is the same as for the Australian Football League's Brownlow Medal. At the conclusion of each game, the field umpires confer, and award three votes to the player deemed best on ground, two votes to the player deemed second-best on ground, and one vote to the player deemed third best on ground. A player is ineligible to win the award if he is suspended for a reportable offence during the season. If more than one player ties for the highest number of votes, each is awarded a Liston Trophy jointly.

=== Past voting systems ===
Initial voting rules for the Woodham and Recorder cups, used from 1924 until 1932, saw the field umpire award two votes in each game: one to the best player on each team; the player with the most votes at the end of the season won the cup. This was amended in 1933, such that the umpire awarded a single vote to the overall best player on the ground; this voting system was used from 1933 until 1939.

When the V.F.A. Medal was established in 1933, its voting system was: the field umpire and each of the two goal umpires separately awarded two votes to the player they deemed best on ground, and one vote to the player they deemed second-best on ground – a total of nine votes awarded per game, with any player able to poll a maximum of six; this voting system was retained when the Recorder Cup and V.F.A. Medals were combined in 1940, and was then used for Liston Trophy voting until 1980.

The system was altered in 1981 when a second field umpire was introduced; after this change, each field umpire awarded votes to the best two players on a 2–1 basis, but the goal umpires did not, giving a new total of six votes per game, with any player able to poll a maximum of four. This system was used only in 1981, and the present day 3–2–1 voting system, based on agreement between the two (and later, three) field umpires, was adopted in 1982.

During the 1930s, multiple players could win the V.F.A. Medal if they were tied on total number of votes. When the Liston Trophy was instituted in 1945, a countback system was introduced, such that if two players tied on votes, the award would go to the player who polled the higher number of first preferences; and (after 1981) if still tied, the higher number of second preferences; if these countbacks failed to separate the players (as occurred in 1978), the players were joint winners. The countback system was abandoned from 1988, making total votes the only criterion for the award; and, in September 1989, the Association amended the history books and awarded Liston Trophies retrospectively to players who had been beaten on a countback, following by five months a similar action taken by the Victorian Football League regarding players who had been beaten for the Brownlow Medal on countback.

== List of winners ==
=== J. J. Liston Trophy ===
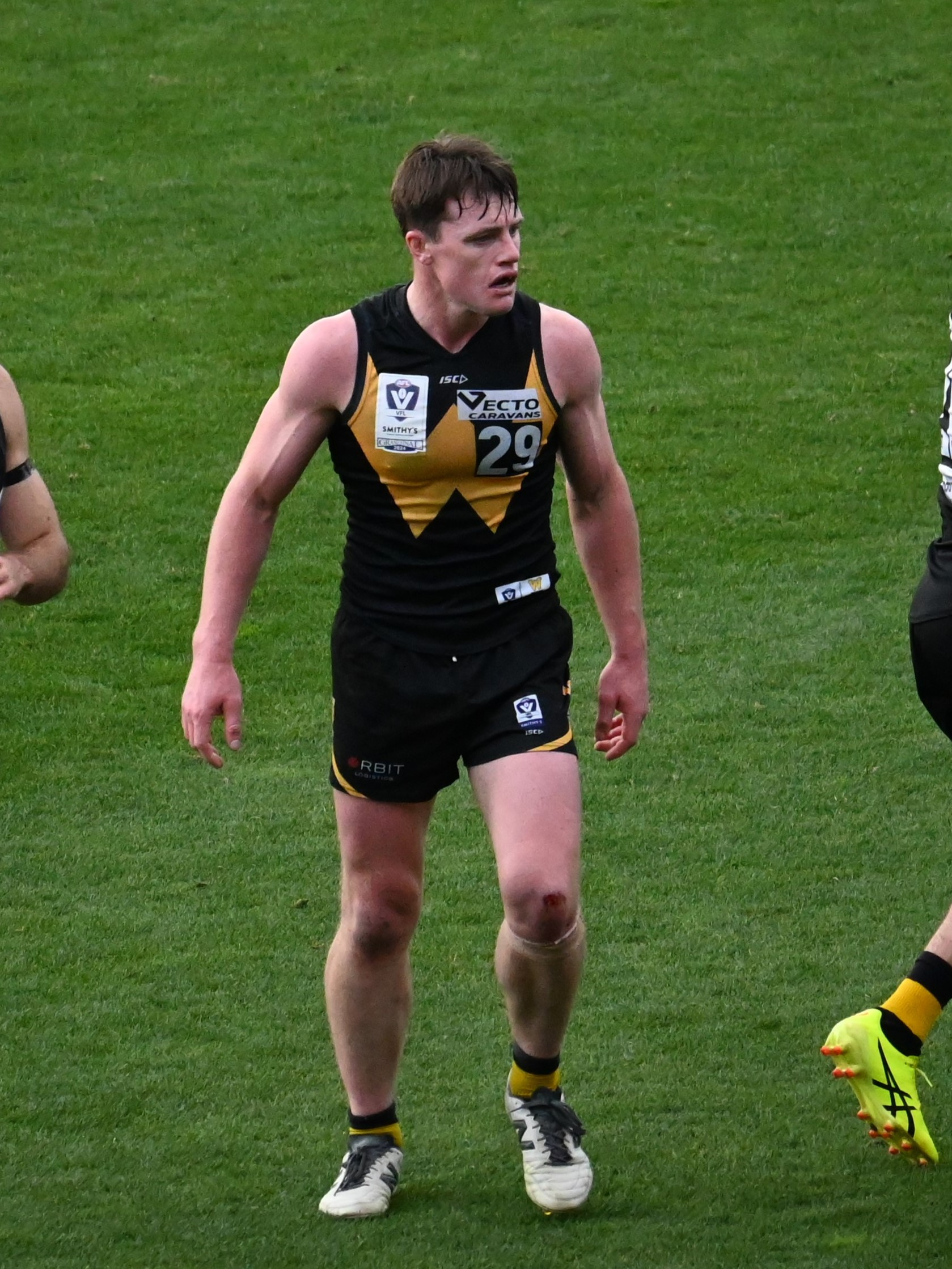
2024 winner Dom Brew

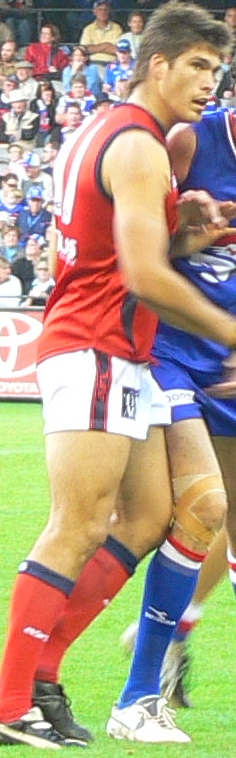
2005 winner Paul Johnson

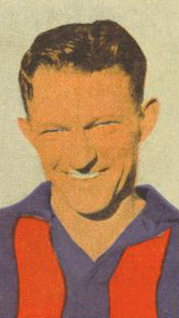
1946 winner Bill Findlay

J.J. Liston Trophy: 1945–1995 (VFA) / 1996–present (VFL)
Season	Player	Club	Votes	Ref.
1945	Eric Beard	Oakleigh	51	
1946	Bill Findlay	Port Melbourne	47	
1947	Stan Tomlins	Sandringham	48	
1948	Russ McIndoe	Brighton	44	
1949	Jack Blackman	Preston	56	
1950	Frank Stubbs	Camberwell	38	
1951	Cec Hiscox	Northcote	40	
1952	Frank Johnson	Port Melbourne	47	
1953	Ted Henrys	Preston	37	
1954	Ted Turner	Brighton	39	
1955	Les Moroney	Moorabbin	37	
1956	Johnny Martin	Williamstown	41	
1957	Ken Ross	Camberwell	32	
1958	Keith Woolnough	Northcote	35	
1959	Bryan Waters	Dandenong	49	
1960	Don Brown	Box Hill	45	
1961	Doug Beasy	Box Hill	39	
1962	Keith Burns	Sandringham	41	
1963	John Clegg	Yarraville	46	
1964	Bill Jones	Oakleigh	32	
1965	Alan Poore	Waverley	28	
1966	Alan Poore	Waverley	39	
1967	Jim Sullivan	Coburg	38	
1968	Dick Telford	Preston	31	
1969	Laurie Hill	Preston	33	
1970	Fred Cook	Yarraville	41	
1971	Laurie Hill	Preston	29	
1972	Don McKenzie	Sunshine	34	
1973	Ray Shaw	Preston	30	
1974	Ray Goold	Sunshine	33	
1975	Derek King	Oakleigh	32	
1976	Danny Hibbert	Dandenong	34	
1977	Bill R. Thompson	Dandenong	56	
1978	Barry Nolan	Brunswick	32	
1978	Trevor Duward	Preston	32	
1979	Vic Aanensen	Port Melbourne	38	
1980	Stephen Allender	Port Melbourne	32	
1981	Vic Aanensen	Port Melbourne	24	
1982	Geoff Austen	Preston	20	
1982	Bill Swan†	Port Melbourne	20	
1982	David Wenn†	Dandenong	20	
1983	Bill Swan	Port Melbourne	19	
1984	Peter Geddes	Frankston	18	
1985	Neil MacLeod	Sandringham	22	
1986	Tony West	Brunswick	18	
1987	Barry Round	Williamstown	19	
1988	Gary Sheldon	Coburg	19	
1988	Brett McTaggart	Williamstown	19	
1989	Saade Ghazi	Williamstown	24	
1990	Joe Garbuio	Oakleigh	14	
1990	Steven Harkins	Port Melbourne	14	
1990	Matthew Burrows	Preston	14	
1990	Stuart Nicol	Springvale	14	
1991	Anthony Eames	Werribee	22	
1992	Joe Rugolo	Sandringham	19	
1993	Michael Sinni	Prahran	19	
1994	Cory Young	Oakleigh	20	
1995	Paul Satterley	Werribee	18	
1996	Paul Dooley	Williamstown	19	
1997	Justin Crough	Sandringham	20	
1998	Michael Frost	Werribee	32	
1999	John Georgiou	Frankston	21	
2000	David Robbins	Springvale	23	
2001	Brett Backwell	Carlton	19	
2001	Ezra Poyas	Coburg	19	
2002	Sam Mitchell	Box Hill	31	
2003	David Robbins	Sandringham	16	
2004	Julian Field	North Ballarat	16	
2005	Ian Callinan	Tasmania	16	
2005	Paul Johnson	Sandringham	16	
2006	Aaron Edwards	Frankston	18	
2007	James Byrne	Geelong	22	
2008	James Podsiadly	Werribee	16	
2009	Myles Sewell	North Ballarat	18	
2010	Steve Clifton	North Ballarat	20	
2010	Shane Valenti	Port Melbourne	20	
2011	Shane Valenti	Port Melbourne	25	
2012	Ben Ross	Werribee	20	
2013	Mitch Hallahan	Box Hill	17	
2013	Steve Clifton	North Ballarat	17	
2013	Jordan Schroder	Geelong	17	
2014	Alex Woodward	Box Hill	20	
2015	Nick Rippon	North Ballarat	15	
2016	Michael Gibbons	Williamstown	17	
2017	Jacob Townsend	Richmond	18	
2018	Anthony Miles	Richmond	19	
2018	Michael Gibbons	Williamstown	19	
2019	Tom Gribble	Werribee	25	
2020	Season not played			
2021	Not awarded			
2022	Tom Gribble	Werribee	30	
2023	Jarryd Lyons	Brisbane	26	
2024	Dom Brew	Werribee	31	
2025	Jacob Dawson	Southport	28	
2026	Trent Mynott	Frankston	22	
2026	George Stevens	Geelong	22	

Note: † denotes the award was won retrospectively.

=== Woodham Cup & Recorder Cup ===
Woodham Cup (1923–1925) Recorder Cup (1926–1941)
Season	Player	Club	Votes	Ref.
1923	Con McCarthy	Footscray	—N/a	
1924	Bob Johnson	Northcote	16	
1925	Tommy Downs	Northcote	5	
1926	William "Bluey" Summers	Preston	8	
1927	Ernie Martin	Coburg	8	
1928	Frank Smith	Prahran	7	
1929	Ted Bourke	Sandringham	9	
1930	Edward Hyde	Port Melbourne	9	
1931	Bill Koop	Prahran	10	
1932	Bob Ross	Northcote	9	
1933	Charlie Stanbridge	Williamstown	7	
1934	Danny Warr	Preston	5	
1935	Les White	Prahran	6	
1936	Bert Hyde	Preston	4	
1936	Peter Reville	Coburg	4	
1937	Neville Huggins	Williamstown	6	
1938	Arthur Cutting	Williamstown	4	
1938	Bill Downie	Northcote	4	
1939	Pat Hartnett	Brighton	5	
1940	Jack Davis‡	Brighton	—N/a	
1941	Des Fothergill‡	Williamstown	—N/a	
League in recess 1942–1944

‡ Automatically awarded to the player awarded the VFA Gold Medal.

=== VFA Gold Medal ===
Awarded (1933–1941)
Season	Player	Club	Votes	Ref.
1933	Charlie Stanbridge	Williamstown	36	
1933	Dave Withers	Oakleigh	36	
1934	John Dowling	Brunswick	37	
1935	Fred Brooks	Williamstown	32	
1935	John Dowling	Brunswick	32	
1936	Neville Huggins	Williamstown	33	
1937	Neville Huggins	Williamstown	24	
1937	Jack Lowry	Prahran	24	
1938	Arthur Cutting	Williamstown	26	
1939	Arthur Cutting	Williamstown	32.5	
1940	Jack Davis	Brighton	38.5	
1941	Des Fothergill	Williamstown	62	

== J. Field Medal ==
J. Field Medal
- Awarded for: The fairest and best player in the VFA Second Division
- Country: Australia
- Presented by: VFA
- First award: 1961
- Final award: 1988

From 1961 until 1988, the J. Field Medal was awarded to the best and fairest in the Association's second division. The award was originally known simply as the Division 2 Best and Fairest until 1968, then was named after former secretary Jack Field in 1969.

The Field Medal voting system was identical to the Liston Trophy voting in all years except 1981, when Division 1 had switched to a two-umpire system but Division 2 was still using a single umpire; in that year, the Field Trophy voting system was unchanged from 1980. As for the Liston Trophy, a countback existed until 1988 to break ties, and retrospective Field Medals were later awarded to players who had lost on this countback.

J. Field Medal (1961–1988)
Season	Player	Club	Votes	Ref.
1961	Pat Fitzgerald	Sunshine	32	
1962	Garry Butler	Prahran	34	
1963	Dick Perry	Geelong West	45	
1964	Shaun Crosbie	Sunshine	43	
1965	John Bradbury	Mordialloc	37	
1966	Ian Williams	Geelong West	48	
1967	Larry Rowe	Caulfield	22	
1967	Colin Sleep†	Northcote	22	
1968	Ian Nankervis	Williamstown	30	
1969	Jim Sullivan	Coburg	44	
1970	Greg Smith	Mordialloc	39	
1971	Rodney Evans	Camberwell	45	
1972	Wayne Schimmelbusch	Brunswick	39	
1973	Geoff Bryant	Box Hill	57	
1974	Ron Allen	Waverley	45	
1975	Geoff Bryant	Box Hill	49	
1976	Colin Boyd	Williamstown	34	
1977	Derek King	Oakleigh	67	
1978	Lance Styles	Waverley	39	
1979	Jeff Edwards	Northcote	58	
1980	Kevin Sait	Yarraville	33	
1981	Brian Matthey	Oakleigh	36	
1982	Mark Williams	Sunshine	25	
1982	Russ Hodges†	Kilsyth	25	
1983	Terry Walsh	Mordialloc	23	
1984	Peter Nicholson	Box Hill	19	
1984	David Callander†	Brunswick	19	
1985	Darren Hall	Dandenong	31	
1986	Darren Hall	Dandenong	30	
1987	Peter Rogerson	Waverley	19	
1988	Stephen Sells	Werribee	23	

† denotes the award was won retrospectively.
