= Neil MacLeod (footballer) =

Australian rules footballer

Personal information
- Full name: Neil MacLeod
- Born: 15 January 1960 (age 66)
- Height: 175 cm (5 ft 9 in)
- Weight: 78 kg (172 lb)
- Position: Rover

Playing career^{1}
Years	Club	Games (Goals)
1977–1978	Fitzroy	10 (7)
1980	St Kilda	4 (5)
Total		14 (12)
- ^{1} Playing statistics correct to the end of 1980.

Neil MacLeod (born 15 January 1960) is a former Australian rules footballer who played for Fitzroy and St Kilda in the Victorian Football League (VFL).

MacLeod, a rover, made his league debut at the age of 17, in the opening round of the 1977 VFL season. He ended up at St Kilda in 1980 and appeared in four games.

Sandringham secured his services in 1981, where he played until 1988 after amassing 87 games and kicking 167 goals. He was a member of Sandringham's premiership team in 1985 and also won the J. J. Liston Trophy that year.
