= Russ Hodges (footballer) =

Australian rules footballer

Personal information
- Full name: Russ Hodges
- Born: 19 July 1953 (age 73)
- Original team: Sandringham
- Height: 185 cm (6 ft 1 in)
- Weight: 83 kg (183 lb)
- Position: Ruck / Halfback

Playing career^{1}
Years	Club	Games (Goals)
1973–77	South Melbourne	38 (10)
1977–78	Fitzroy	31 (3)
Total		69 (13)
- ^{1} Playing statistics correct to the end of 1978.

Russ Hodges (born 19 July 1953) is a former Australian rules footballer who played with South Melbourne and Fitzroy in the Victorian Football League (VFL).

Hodges also played VFA football for Sandringham and Kilsyth, serving as the inaugural captain-coach of the latter. In his time at Kilsyth in 1982, he jointly won the J. Field Medal as best and fairest in Division 2 (he originally finished runner-up on countback, but was later retrospectively made joint winner) and captained the Division 2 representative team.
