= 2010 VFL season =

129th season of the Victorian Football League

- Date: 10 April – 19 September 2010
- Teams: 14
- Premiers: North Ballarat; 3rd premiership
- Runners-up: Northern Bullants; 6th runners-up result
- Minor premiers: Williamstown; 10th minor premiership
- J. J. Liston Trophy: Steve Clifton (North Ballarat – 20 votes); Shane Valenti (Port Melbourne – 20 votes)
- Frosty Miller Medallist: Matthew Little (Williamstown – 80 goals)

The 2010 VFL season was the 129th season of the Victorian Football League (VFL), a second-tier Australian rules football competition played in the state of Victoria.

North Ballarat won the premiership for the third time and the third year in a row, defeating the Northern Bullants by 47 points in the 2010 VFL Grand Final.

== Clubs ==
This season featured the addition of the Queensland-based Gold Coast Football Club to the league, the first new club in the VFL since Tasmania entered in 2001. Gold Coast's participation in the VFL was as part of the club's preparation for its entry into the Australian Football League in 2011: the club had played one season of under-18s football in the TAC Cup in 2009, then was to play one season of state/reserves football in the VFL in 2010 before its AFL senior debut.

The VFL continued to serve as both the top state-level football league in Victoria, and as a reserves competition for Victorian-based clubs in the Australian Football League, as had been the case since 2000. The affiliation agreements between VFL and AFL clubs were unchanged from 2009.

=== Venues and affiliations ===
Club	State	Home venue(s)	Capacity	AFL affiliation
Bendigo	VIC	Queen Elizabeth Oval	10,000	Essendon
Bendigo	VIC	Windy Hill	10,000	Essendon
Bendigo	VIC	Strathfieldsaye Oval		Essendon
Box Hill	VIC	Box Hill City Oval	10,000	Hawthorn
Casey	VIC	Casey Fields	9,000	Melbourne
Coburg	VIC	Coburg City Oval	15,000	Richmond
Coburg	VIC	Highgate Recreation Reserve	5,000	Richmond
Collingwood	VIC	Victoria Park	10,000	Collingwood
Frankston	VIC	Frankston Park	5,000	—N/a
Geelong	VIC	Skilled Stadium	28,000	Geelong
Gold Coast	QLD	Cazalys Stadium	13,500	—N/a
Gold Coast	QLD	Cooke Murphy Oval	8,000	—N/a
Gold Coast	QLD	Fankhauser Reserve	8,000	—N/a
Gold Coast	QLD	Kombumerri Park	6,500	—N/a
North Ballarat	VIC	Eureka Stadium	11,000	North Melbourne
Northern Bullants	VIC	NAB Oval	5,000	Carlton
Northern Bullants	VIC	Visy Park	35,000	Carlton
Port Melbourne	VIC	TEAC Oval	6,000	—N/a
Sandringham	VIC	Trevor Barker Beach Oval	6,000	St Kilda
Werribee	VIC	Chirnside Park	8,000	North Melbourne
Williamstown	VIC	Williamstown Cricket Ground	6,000	Western Bulldogs

== Ladder ==
Pos	Team	Pld	W	L	D	PF	PA	PP	Pts	Qualification
1	Williamstown	18	15	3	0	2174	1312	165.7	60	Finals series
2	North Ballarat (P)	18	15	3	0	1650	1260	131.0	60	Finals series
3	Casey Scorpions	18	14	4	0	1619	1471	110.1	56	Finals series
4	Port Melbourne	18	13	5	0	1946	1506	129.2	52	Finals series
5	Box Hill Hawks	18	11	7	0	1663	1531	108.6	44	Finals series
6	Northern Bullants	18	10	8	0	1814	1539	117.9	40	Finals series
7	Collingwood	18	10	8	0	1672	1509	110.8	40	Finals series
8	Bendigo	18	10	8	0	1564	1533	102.0	40	Finals series
9	Sandringham	18	7	11	0	1366	1463	93.4	28	
10	Gold Coast	18	5	12	1	1409	1706	82.6	22	
11	Coburg	18	5	13	0	1502	1757	85.5	20	
12	Geelong	18	5	13	0	1401	1743	80.4	20	
13	Werribee	18	4	13	1	1586	1957	81.0	18	
14	Frankston	18	1	17	0	1000	2079	48.1	4	

Source: sportingpulse.com
Rules for classification: 1) points; 2) percentage; 3) number of points for.
(P) Premiers

== Finals series ==
The preliminary finals and the reserves Grand Final were moved from TEAC Oval to Box Hill City Oval because heavy rain and frequent use during September had left TEAC Oval unplayable.

Qualifying and elimination finals
28 Aug, Box Hill City Oval
1	Williamstown	19.15 (129)
4	Port Melbourne	10.11 (71)
29 Aug, Box Hill City Oval
5	Box Hill Hawks	20.16 (136)
8	Bendigo Bombers	10.11 (71)
28 Aug, TEAC Oval
6	Northern Bullants	15.18 (108)
7	Collingwood	8.9 (57)
29 Aug, TEAC Oval
2	North Ballarat	18.8 (116)
3	Casey Scorpions	13.6 (84)

Semi-finals
5 Sep, TEAC Oval
Port Melbourne	12.17 (89)
Box Hill Hawks	14.11 (95)
4 Sep, TEAC Oval
Casey Scorpions	9.6 (60)
Northern Bullants	10.11 (71)

Preliminary finals
11 Sep, Box Hill City Oval
Williamstown	11.12 (78)
Northern Bullants	16.8 (104)
12 Sep, Box Hill City Oval
North Ballarat	16.18 (114)
Box Hill Hawks	6.17 (53)

Grand final
19 Sep, Etihad Stadium
North Ballarat	20.13 (133)
Northern Bullants	13.8 (86)

=== Grand Final ===
2010 VFL Grand Final
Sunday 19 September (2:15 pm)	North Ballarat	def.	Northern Bullants	Etihad Stadium (crowd: 11,000)
6.5 (41); 10.9 (69); 14.9 (93); 20.13 (133)	Q1; Q2; Q3; Final	1.1 (7); 5.3 (33); 10.5 (65); 13.8 (86)	Norm Goss Memorial Medal: Myles Sewell (North Ballarat)
Hale 3, Jones 3, J. Smith 3, Dinnell 2, Driscoll 2, Feery, Harding, Micallef, Norris, I. Smith, Stephenson, White	Goals	Fisher 4, Ellard 2, Jacobs 2, Iacobucci, McCorkell, Neaves, Thomas, Tuohy

== Awards ==
- The J. J. Liston Trophy was jointly won by Steve Clifton (North Ballarat) and Shane Valenti (Port Melbourne), who each polled 20 votes. Ed Curnow (Box Hill) finished third on 13 votes, despite breaking his leg in Round 13 and missing the remainder of the season.
- The Frosty Miller Medal was won by Matthew Little (Williamstown), who kicked 80 goals for the season.
- The Fothergill–Round Medal was won by Michael Hibberd (Frankston)
- The top three teams after the finals – North Ballarat, Northern Bullants and Williamstown – qualified for the 2011 Foxtel Cup.
- Box Hill won the reserves premiership. Box Hill 17.20 (122) defeated Williamstown 16.9 (105) in the Grand Final, held as a curtain-raiser to the Seniors First Preliminary Final on 11 September.

2010 VFL Team of the Year
B:	Michael Stockdale (Casey)	Peter Faulks (Williamstown)	Adam Iacobucci (Northern Bullants)
HB:	Michael Hibberd (Frankston)	Sam Pleming (Port Melbourne)	Cameron Richardson (North Ballarat)
C:	Ben Davies (Williamstown)	Brett Johnson (Williamstown)	Sam Power (Coburg Tigers)
HF:	David Swallow (Gold Coast)	Callum Sinclair (Port Melbourne)	Steve Clifton (North Ballarat)
F:	Zac Smith (Gold Coast)	Matthew Little (Williamstown)	Shane Valenti (Port Melbourne)
Foll:	Orren Stephenson (North Ballarat)	Myles Sewell (North Ballarat)	Ed Curnow (Box Hill)
Int:	Russell Gabriel (Frankston)	Dom Gleeson (Werribee)	James Wall (Casey)
Int:	Toby Pinwill (Port Melbourne)	Jonothan Simpkin (Geelong)	Ben Jolley (Williamstown)
Coach:	Gerard FitzGerald (North Ballarat)		

== Notable events ==
- For the second consecutive season, Bendigo was not permitted to use its home ground Queen Elizabeth Oval after May due to an unfit surface. The club's remaining home matches were played at either Windy Hill or Strathfieldsaye Oval.

== See also ==
- 2010 AFL season
