= Thomas Downs =

Thomas Downs may refer to:

- Thomas Nelson Downs (1867–1938), American magician
- Tommy Downs (1901–1981), Australian rules footballer

== See also ==
- Thomas Downs House, Charlestown, Indiana
