= 1947 VFA season =

1947 VFA premiership season
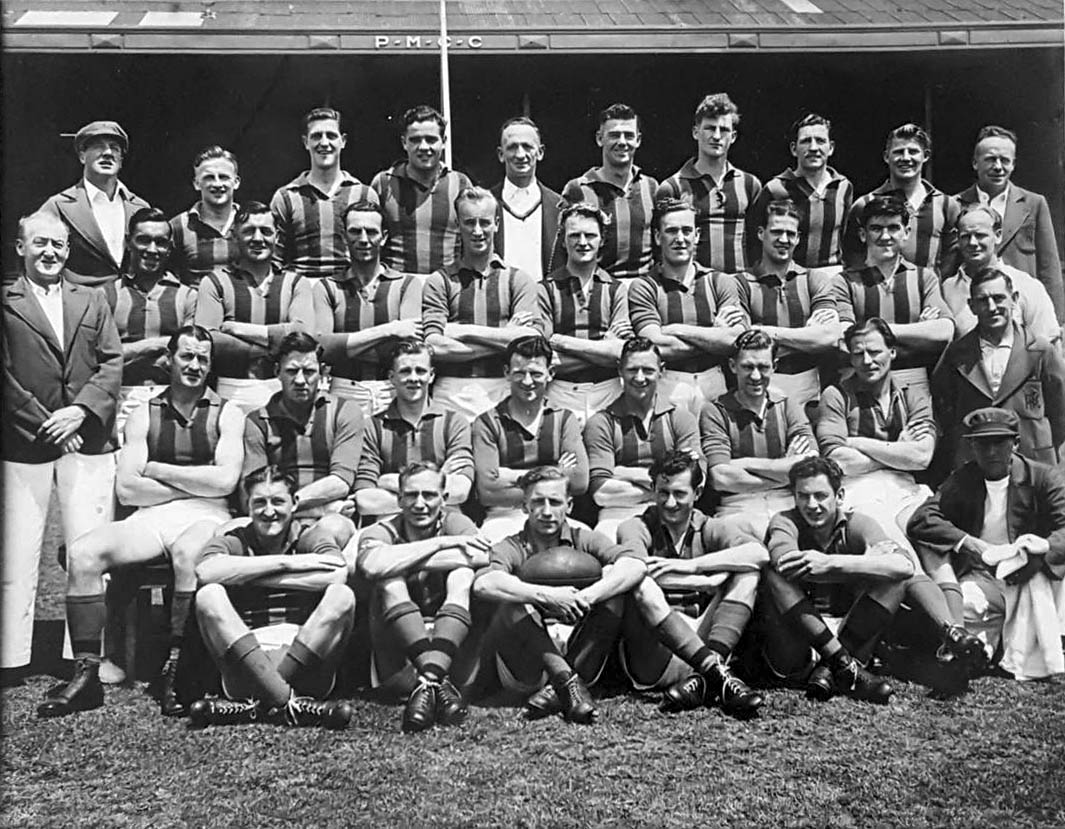
- Port Melbourne FC, premiers
- Teams: 12
- Premiers: Port Melbourne; 6th premiership
- Minor premiers: Port Melbourne; 2nd minor premiership

Attendance
- Matches played: 136
- Total attendance: 570,750 (4,197 per match)

The 1947 Victorian Football Association season was the 66th season of the Australian rules football competition. The premiership was won by the Port Melbourne Football Club, which defeated Sandringham by 31 points in the Grand Final on 4 October. It was the sixth premiership in the club's history.

== Premiership ==
The home-and-home season was played over twenty-two matches, before the top four clubs contested a finals series under the Page–McIntyre system to determine the premiers for the season.

=== Ladder ===
1947 VFA ladder
Pos	Team	Pld	W	L	D	PF	PA	PP	Pts
1	Port Melbourne (P)	22	16	5	1	2512	2109	119.1	66
2	Williamstown	22	16	6	0	2326	2047	113.6	64
3	Sandringham	22	15	7	0	2279	2015	113.1	60
4	Prahran	22	14	7	1	2420	2181	111.0	58
5	Brighton	22	13	9	0	2693	2359	114.2	52
6	Brunswick	22	12	9	1	2693	2359	114.2	50
7	Camberwell	22	10	12	0	2220	2263	98.1	40
8	Oakleigh	22	8	13	1	2136	2341	91.2	34
9	Coburg	22	7	14	1	2052	2238	91.7	30
10	Preston	22	7	14	1	1962	2183	89.9	30
11	Yarraville	22	7	15	0	2237	2608	85.8	28
12	Northcote	22	4	18	0	1728	2263	76.4	16

Rules for classification: 1) points; 2) percentage; 3) number of points for.
(P) Premiers

=== Finals ===
	Semifinals
Saturday, 13 September	Sandringham 10.6 (66)	def.	Prahran 6.18 (54)	St Kilda Cricket Ground (crowd: 24,000)
Saturday, 20 September	Port Melbourne 20.19 (139)	def.	Williamstown 15.20 (110)	St Kilda Cricket Ground (crowd: 18,000)

	Preliminary Final
Saturday, 27 September	Williamstown 16.18 (114)	def. by	Sandringham 16.21 (117)	St Kilda Cricket Ground (crowd: 18,000)

1947 VFA Grand Final
Saturday, 4 October	Port Melbourne	def.	Sandringham	St Kilda Cricket Ground (crowd: 24,000)
6.3 (39); 9.5 (59); 12.11 (83); 15.13 (103)	Q1; Q2; Q3; Final	1.1 (7); 5.5 (35); 6.7 (43); 11.8 (74)	Umpires: Barnes
Houston 5, Findlay 3, Thoms 3, Culph, Lewis, Murphy, Reynolds	Goals	Brokenshire 3, Collins 3, Parker 2, Guille, Laver, Sales
Findlay (cut eye), Ferguson (concussion)	Injuries	Irvine (cut eye), Parker (cut eye), O'Toole (ankle)
Butcher, for striking Bencraft in the first quarter Butcher, for striking Brokenshire in the first quarter Reynolds, for striking Brown in the final quarter Thoms, for kicking Brown in the final quarter	Reports	Cerini, for elbowing Thoms in the final quarter

== Awards ==
- The leading goalkicker for the season was Bill Findlay (Port Melbourne), who kicked 100 goals in the home-and-home season and 107 goals overall. Douglas (Brighton) finished level with Findlay on 100 goals after the home-and-home season, but did not participate in finals.
- The J. J. Liston Trophy was won by Stan Tomlins (Sandringham), who polled 48 votes. Cec Hiscox (Northcote) was second with 39 votes and J. Turner (Brighton) was third with 35 votes.
- Coburg won the seconds premiership. Coburg 11.13 (79) defeated Prahran 9.15 (69) in the Grand Final, played as a curtain raiser to the firsts Grand Final on 4 October.

== Notable events ==
- Mr Henry Zwar, MLA resigned from his position as president of the Association, which he had held since May 1944. At the annual general meeting in February 1947, former Oakleigh president Mr Squire Reid, MLA was elected as his replacement; he served in the role until his death in July 1949.
- The Association introduced a free kick for "kicking in danger" – that is, kicking recklessly at the ball where there is a strong risk of kicking an opposing player in the process, even if no contact is made with the opposing player. No such provision existed under ANFC rules until at least a decade later.
- On Monday 16 June (King's Birthday holiday), a combined Association team played against a combined Bendigo Football Association team – which was bolstered by some Association players to make for a more even contest – at Golden Square Oval in Bendigo. Bendigo 19.7 (131) defeated the Association 17.5 (107).
- For the second consecutive season, Sandringham overcame a large three-quarter time deficit to beat Williamstown in the preliminary final. Sandringham 9.13 (67) trailed Williamstown 14.14 (98) at three-quarter time, before kicking seven goals to two in the final quarter to win by three points, 16.21 (117) d. 16.18 (114). In the corresponding game in 1946, Williamstown had led by 40 points at three-quarter time.

== See also ==
- List of VFA/VFL Premiers
