= 1980 VFA season =

1980 VFA Premiership Season
- Teams: 20

Division 1
- Teams: 10
- Premiers: Port Melbourne (13th premiership)
- Minor premiers: Coburg (5th minor premiership)

Division 2
- Teams: 10
- Premiers: Brunswick (2nd D2 premiership)
- Minor premiers: Yarraville (1st D2 minor premiership)

The 1980 Victorian Football Association season was the 99th season of the top division of the Australian rules football competition, and the 20th season of second division competition. The Division 1 premiership was won by the Port Melbourne Football Club, after it defeated Coburg in the Grand Final on 21 September by eleven points; it was Port Melbourne's 13th Division 1 premiership, the first of three premierships won in a row between 1980 and 1982, and the fourth of six premierships won in nine seasons from 1974 until 1982. The Division 2 premiership was won by Brunswick; it was the club's second Division 2 premiership, and was won in its first season since relegation from Division 1.

== Rule changes ==
The Association introduced a number of on-field and off-field rule changes in the 1980 season.

=== Seconds competition scheduling ===
For the first time, Association Seconds matches were played as curtain-raisers to Firsts matches. When the seconds competition was established in the 1920s, scheduling was such that the seconds played at the same time as the firsts, with the seconds playing at home when the firsts played away and vice versa. In the 1960s, as the firsts gradually migrated from a Saturday competition to a Sunday competition, the seconds had remained a Saturday competition, still playing at home on alternate weekends to the firsts but on different days. Now, for the first time, the seconds were played as curtain-raisers; and, also for the first time, the seconds became a Sunday competition.

As a result, the seconds finals became curtain-raisers to the firsts finals; this had happened previously when both competitions were Saturday competitions. However, one consequence was that the lightning premiership, which had occupied the curtain-raiser time-slot since 1972, was discontinued.

=== Grounds sharing ===
In the pre-season, Brunswick asked the Association for permission to sublet its home ground, Gillon Oval, to the Juventus soccer club, which was playing in the Victorian soccer competition. Brunswick was struggling financially due to a declining supporter base and sponsorship, and could barely afford to operate; but, it had arranged a deal with the Brunswick Council for a ten-winter lease of Gillon Oval which was financially viable for the club only if it could sublet the ground to Juventus on alternate weekends.

The Association had historically operated under strict ground control rules which required clubs to have access to their grounds throughout the winter: these rules served the practical purpose of ensuring the seconds had a venue to use on weekends when the firsts played away; and, served the strategic purpose of tying up the best suburban venues to maintain a competitive advantage over rival codes, most notably soccer and rugby. These ground control rules were most strictly enforced in 1959 when Prahran was expelled from the Association because the Victorian Rugby Union was given access to Toorak Park. Given this history, the notion of allowing ground-sharing with a soccer club would be a significant change in policy for the Association. However, as more Association clubs, particularly in areas like Brunswick with high migrant populations where the popularity of soccer and apathy towards football were at their highest, encountered financial hardships and struggled with ground rent, the Association recognised that it could no longer maintain this hardline approach. As such, on 21 March, the Association voted 16–4 to grant wider permission for ground sharing amongst its clubs.

=== Order-off rule ===
The Association adopted an order-off rule, allowing umpires to order a player to leave the field as punishment for high severity indiscretions. In practice, players were ordered off for some but not all reportable offences. Under the rules, a player would be ordered from the field for fifteen minutes of game time and could not be replaced, such that the team played one man short over this time – and indeed, in a Seconds match late in the season, Prahran's score was annulled after a headcount revealed that they had erroneously replaced the ordered off player.

== Division 1 ==
The Division 1 home-and-away season was played over 18 rounds; the top four then contested the finals under the Page–McIntyre system. The finals were played at the Junction Oval.

=== Ladder ===
1980 VFA Division 1 Ladder
Pos	Team	Pld	W	L	D	PF	PA	PP	Pts
1	Coburg	18	16	2	0	2482	1859	133.5	64
2	Port Melbourne (P)	18	13	5	0	2517	2025	124.3	52
3	Geelong West	18	12	6	0	2252	2230	101.0	48
4	Sandringham	18	10	8	0	2181	2093	104.2	40
5	Prahran	18	10	8	0	2189	2361	92.7	40
6	Dandenong	18	9	8	1	2093	1975	106.0	38
7	Preston	18	6	12	0	2188	2255	97.0	24
8	Frankston	18	5	13	0	2028	2428	83.5	20
9	Caulfield	18	4	13	1	2031	2310	87.9	18
10	Camberwell	18	4	14	0	1861	2286	81.4	16

Rules for classification: 1) points; 2) percentage; 3) number of points for.
(P) Premiers

=== Finals ===
	Semi-finals
Sunday, 31 August	Geelong West 17.14 (116)	def.	Sandringham 12.12 (84)	Junction Oval (crowd: 6,835)
Sunday, 7 September	Coburg 15.10 (100)	def. by	Port Melbourne 22.18 (150)	Junction Oval (crowd: 12,474)

	Preliminary Final
Sunday, 14 September	Coburg 14.16 (100)	def.	Geelong West 12.17 (89)	Junction Oval (crowd: 5,496)

1980 VFA Division 1 Grand Final
Sunday, 21 September	Port Melbourne	def.	Coburg	Junction Oval (crowd: 22,010)
1.2 (8); 2.9 (21); 5.11 (41); 11.15 (81)	Q1; Q2; Q3; Final	3.5 (23); 5.8 (38); 8.10 (58); 10.10 (70)	Umpires: Roy Groom, Frank Vergona
Cook 4, Christou 3, Ebeyer 2, Evans, Swan	Goals	Collins 2, Douglas 2, Herbert 2, Smith 2, Cleary, Dohnt

=== Awards ===
- The leading goalkicker for the season was Fred Cook (Port Melbourne), who kicked 101 goals during the home-and-away season and 112 goals overall.
- The J. J. Liston Trophy was won by Stephen Allender (Port Melbourne), who polled 32 votes. Allender finished ahead of Phil Neilson (Camberwell), who was second with 27 votes, and Derek King (Caulfield), who polled 23 votes.
- Port Melbourne won the seconds premiership. Port Melbourne 16.19 (115) defeated Coburg 10.13 (73) in the Grand Final, played as a curtain-raiser to the seniors Grand Final between the same teams on 21 September.

== Division 2 ==
The Division 2 home-and-away season was played over eighteen rounds; the top four then contested the finals under the Page–McIntyre system; all finals were played on Sundays at Toorak Park.

=== Ladder ===
1980 VFA Division 2 Ladder
Pos	Team	Pld	W	L	D	PF	PA	PP	Pts
1	Yarraville	18	14	4	0	2111	1703	124.0	56
2	Brunswick (P)	18	12	6	0	2092	1669	125.3	48
3	Waverley	18	11	7	0	1939	1827	106.1	44
4	Williamstown	18	10	8	0	2163	1891	114.4	40
5	Mordialloc	18	10	8	0	2031	1904	106.7	40
6	Oakleigh	18	9	9	0	1979	1861	106.3	36
7	Sunshine	18	9	9	0	1843	1891	97.5	36
8	Northcote	18	7	11	0	1852	1949	95.0	28
9	Werribee	18	7	11	0	1943	2170	89.5	28
10	Box Hill	18	1	17	0	1535	2623	58.5	4

Rules for classification: 1) points; 2) percentage; 3) number of points for.
(P) Premiers

=== Finals ===
	Semi-finals
Sunday, 17 August	Waverley 21.13 (139)	def.	Williamstown 13.18 (96)	Toorak Park (crowd: 3,475)
Sunday, 24 August	Yarraville 16.12 (108)	def. by	Brunswick 19.16 (130)	Toorak Park (crowd: 2,578)

	Preliminary Final
Sunday, 31 August	Yarraville 19.16 (130)	def.	Waverley 14.15 (99)	Toorak Park (crowd: 2,215)

1980 VFA Division 2 Grand Final
Sunday, 7 September	Brunswick	def.	Yarraville	Toorak Park (crowd: 5,243)
8.8 (56); 9.12 (66); 16.22 (118); 20.27 (147)	Q1; Q2; Q3; Final	2.4 (16); 8.10 (58); 9.12 (66); 14.14 (98)	Umpires: Bill Torney, Maurie Stabb
Cleary 3, Crotty 3, Gunston 3, Nolan 2, Sahlberg 2, West 2, Dolan, Huggard, Kimpton, Lawrence, Toy	Goals	Fotheringham 5, Radziminski 3, Simpson 3, Breheny, Davis, Sait
Nolan, reported and ordered off for striking Breheny in the third quarter	Reports	Jones, reported for striking Kimpton in the third quarter Radziminski, reported and ordered off for charging Nolan in the third quarter Sharp, reported and ordered off for striking Sahlberg in the third quarter

=== Awards ===
- The leading goalkicker for the Division 2 home-and-away season was Peter McKenna (Northcote) who kicked 98 goals and did not participate in finals. The leading goalkicker across the whole season including finals was Paul Angelis (Waverley), who finished with 100 goals; he was equal-third with Kevin Leece (Werribee) in the home-and-away season with 90 goals, behind McKenna and Peter Neville (Mordialloc, 95 goals).
- The J. Field Medal was won by Kevin Sait (Yarraville). Jeff Edwards (Northcote) was second.
- Williamstown won the seconds premiership. Williamstown 21.22 (148) defeated Brunswick 19.13 (127) in the Grand Final, played as a curtain-raiser to the senior Grand Final on 7 September.

== Notable events ==
=== Discussions with the Victorian Football League ===
During the 1980 season, the Association executive engaged in a series of discussions with Victorian Football League executives over a number of football control issues in Victoria. It was the first time the League and the Association had engaged in any productive collaborative discussion since their relationship soured in the aftermath of North Melbourne's move to Coburg in 1965.

Of primary importance to the League was Sunday football. The Association had begun playing matches on Sundays in 1960, and by 1980, Victorian state government rules allowed for almost all sports except for horse racing and League football to be played on Sunday. The League was keen to break into the Sunday market, and proposed to play a game at both the Melbourne Cricket Ground and VFL Park each Sunday – but the Association gained a lot of value from its status as the highest level Sunday football competition. Both political parties in state government were sympathetic to the Association's cause, so an agreement between the League and Association was the only thing likely to sway the government's opinion. The League brought a number of concessions to the table in its efforts to negotiate with the Association, including:

- No telecasts of Sunday League games
- Reconsidering its push to play televised matches on Sundays outside Victoria – Sunday League games had been played in Sydney since 1979 and moving games to Brisbane was also under consideration
- The League to financially compensate the Association for lost gates
- Offering the Association access to VFL Park for matches, including finals
- Supporting the Association's attempts to join the Australian Football Championships night series.

The Association, which had been suffering a decline in finances and popularity since the mid 1970s, was keen to discuss a number of football control issues and options which it thought could help its viability. Among the agenda items were:

- Re-establishing a reciprocal transfer agreement between the League and Association
- Seeking support for the Association to rejoin the National Football League, ten years after its expulsion for breaking the transfer agreement it previously had in place
- A potential amalgamation between the League Reserves competition and the Association Division 1. Under the proposal, Division 1 would expand to twelve teams, and each would be affiliated with a League club; League players who were not selected in their senior teams would then become available to play with their Association club, instead of the Reserves. Association gates had suffered dramatically in the late 1970s, and one contributing factor was that the number of former League players who had transferred to Association clubs had dropped, so it was thought that an affiliation arrangement could help by bringing more high-profile players back to the Association.
- The establishment of a new Victorian Metropolitan Football League, to replace the Victorian Football Union as the administrative body for all levels of football in Melbourne – in much the same way that the Victorian Country Football League administered country football. Early proposals included promotion and relegation from the city's suburban leagues into and out of the Association second division, revised zoning rules affecting the League clubs, and more unified control.

Ultimately, none of these ideas was adopted in the immediate term. The Association discussed the League's proposal for Sunday football at a Board of Management meeting, but voted against it by an overwhelming 22–3 margin, agreeing that Sunday football was one of the Association's only valuable assets and it could not be given up. Negotiation on all other initiatives broke down shortly thereafter. However, despite its lack of tangible outcomes, the discussions were valuable as signalling an improvement in the relationship between the competitions, and they were notable as the first time that an amalgamation between the League reserves and the Association seniors had been seriously discussed – a structural change which ultimately took place twenty years later, prior to the 2000 season.

=== Interleague matches ===
In 1980, the Association played two of its highest-profile interstate matches for more than a decade, with matches against the Northern Tasmanian Football Association and the South Australian National Football League. The team was captained by Fred Cook (Port Melbourne) and coached by Mick Erwin (Prahran).

The Association's 30-point loss against the S.A.N.F.L. impressed many observers, as the latter had been expected to win comfortably.

	1980 Interleague Matches
Saturday, 14 June	N.T.F.A. 9.12 (66)	def. by	V.F.A. 28.19 (187)	York Park
Saturday, 5 July	S.A.N.F.L. 19.21 (135)	def.	V.F.A. 15.15 (105)	Football Park (crowd: 10,000)

=== Scoreboard rigging controversy ===
In the final round of the Division 1 home-and-away season, Camberwell Football Club officials caused controversy by intentionally displaying incorrect around-the-grounds scores on their scoreboard. Camberwell hosted Dandenong at the Camberwell Sports Ground in the final round, and both teams needed to win and see other results fall favourably to achieve their goals: for Dandenong, it needed to win and see Prahran lose to Preston to finish fourth; for Camberwell, it needed to win and see Frankston lose to Caulfield to avoid relegation. The Camberwell–Dandenong match was close, and Dandenong led by three points at three-quarter time, but the around-the-grounds scores showed Prahran comfortably ahead of Preston, ostensibly ending Dandenong's chances of reaching the finals. Camberwell 17.14 (116) went on to defeat Dandenong 16.15 (111) by five points.

It was only after the game that Dandenong officials discovered that the displayed score of the Preston–Prahran match had been false: Preston had actually led by seven goals at three-quarter time, and ended by winning by 68 points, Preston 32.15 (207) d. Prahran 21.13 (139). Dandenong officials were incensed, with coach Ray Biffin and secretary Lionel Farrow claiming that the false scores had taken away Dandenong's incentive to try its best in the final quarter against Camberwell and, given the close result of the game, probably cost it a finals berth. In response, Camberwell secretary Ron Elleray confirmed the scoreboard rigging was intentional, and was entirely unrepentant, saying "it was gamesmanship, and if they were silly enough to fall for it, that's their bad luck."

Prahran's and Dandenong's losses opened the door for Sandringham to secure fourth, which it did with a 20-point win against Geelong West. Despite its win, Camberwell was unable to avoid relegation, as Frankston defeated Caulfield. Frankston officials were also suspected of potential scoreboard rigging, as Frankston Park announcers had announced at three-quarter time that Camberwell led Dandenong by 20 points, when in fact Camberwell trailed by three points; Caulfield officials noted that the announcement may have spurred Frankston, then leading by 17 points, on to its 34-point victory, but Caulfield made no official complaint and Frankston, unlike Camberwell, denied the misinformation was intentional.

The Association executive committee was unimpressed with Camberwell's actions. In October, Camberwell was fined $20 for its misconduct, although the Association put on the record that it would have fined the club $500 if its constitution had allowed it to do so.

=== Other notable events ===
- The Association issued tape recorders to the field umpires in place of a pen and pad for making reports.
- On 13 April, Prahran trailed Sandringham by 42 points at half time, but recovered to win the match by six points, Prahran 22.12 (144) d. Sandringham 20.18 (138).
- On 27 July, Ian Fairley (Williamstown) kicked eight goals against Box Hill in his senior debut, at the age of only 15 years 9 months; despite the performance, he was dropped from the senior team the following week, to ensure he remained eligible to play finals for the thirds.
- The Association trialled the use of two field umpires for the first time during the finals matches in both divisions; home-and-away matches continued to be controlled by a single field umpire through the year.

== See also ==
- List of VFA/VFL premiers
