= 1959 VFA season =

78th season of the Victorian Football Association

Overview
- Teams: 16
- Premiers: Williamstown; 10th premiership
- Minor premiers: Williamstown; 8th minor premiership

The 1959 VFA season was the 78th season of the Victorian Football Association (VFA), an Australian rules football competition played in the state of Victoria.

The premiership was won by the Williamstown Football Club after it defeated Coburg in the Grand Final on 10 October by 35 points. It was Williamstown's tenth premiership, taking it past Footscray to become the club with the most premierships won in VFA history, a title it held until it was passed by Port Melbourne in 1976. It was also the fifth of five premierships Williamstown won in six seasons between 1954 and 1959, and the club's fourth consecutive minor premiership.

== Association membership ==
Prior to 1959, the Prahran Football Club was expelled from the Association for failing to meet the minimum home ground requirements, and was replaced by the Sunshine Football Club. As such, the Association membership numbers remained constant at 16.

=== Expulsion of Prahran ===
Throughout its history, the Prahran Football Club had played its home matches at Toorak Oval, which it leased throughout the winter from the City of Prahran. At the time, each Association club played a Seconds match on its home venue on weekends when the firsts team was playing away – the practice of playing Seconds games as curtain-raisers to Firsts games was not established until 1980. On 4 March 1959, the Prahran Council announced that it was seeking tenders to let Toorak Oval to a separate sporting body on alternate weekends during winter – such that the Prahran First Sixteen would play its home matches there, and another sport would be played there when the Prahran Firsts were playing away. The Council was primarily seeking to improve its financial return on the venue: it cost the city £2,000 to maintain and operate the ground annually, and it received only £60 from the football club in rent for the entire winter, and the gate takings from Seconds matches were meagre; but, it received comparatively enormous offers of £440 from the Jugoslav United Soccer Team and £660 from the Victorian Rugby Union to lease the ground on alternate Saturdays during winter. This was not the first time that other codes had made attempts to share occupancy of Association venues; in 1954, the Prahran council had turned down an offer of £800 from J.U.S.T. to lease Toorak Oval on alternate weekends, and Hakoah made unsuccessful attempts to share the Camberwell Sports Ground with Camberwell in 1955 and 1956.

The potential to lose access to Toorak Oval for Seconds games was a problem for the Prahran Football Club, because the VFA constitution included a requirement that all clubs' Firsts and Seconds must play their matches on the same home ground on alternate weekends – with the exception of Brighton, which had a decades-long arrangement to share Elsternwick Park with the Elsternwick Amateur Football Club. On 6 March, the Association confirmed that it would expel Prahran if it could not meet these requirements. The Association's hardline approach was based on a slippery slope argument, that allowing one council to seek a more lucrative deal for alternate Saturdays would result in all councils eventually taking the same action; access to better venues would be a fillip for rugby, soccer and other sports which were in direct competition with the Association, and would therefore be detrimental to the Association's long-term popularity and viability.

In two weeks of negotiations, the council offered the Prahran Seconds the use of Como Park, and offered to provide temporary fencing to bring the venue to Association standards; and alternatively suggested that the Prahran Seconds could play a curtain-raiser to the successful bidder – but the Association rejected both suggestions. The Prahran Football Club also increased its own offer to the council from £60 to £175 to lease the ground for the entire winter.

On 16 March, the Prahran Council formally agreed to lease Toorak Oval to the Victorian Rugby Union on alternate Saturdays, and the Association Board of Management unanimously agreed to expel Prahran. The Association made clear that it would welcome Prahran back as soon as it was able to secure a ground for the entire winter, and the club ultimately came to an agreement with the council in October 1959, with rent of £100 per year; as such, Prahran's expulsion lasted only for the 1959 season. Prahran spent the 1959 season in the Metropolitan Football League (MFL), and won its premiership. Permission was given for Prahran's players to be cleared to other clubs in Melbourne, under a gentlemen's agreement that they be cleared back to Prahran when the club was re-admitted to the Association.

=== Admission of Sunshine ===
With Prahran expelled from the Association, the Sunshine Football Club lodged an application to replace it. Sunshine's application was first reported on 24 March, and was accepted unanimously by the remaining members of the Association on 27 March. The Association had made overtures to a club based in Sunshine as early as the central ground dispute of 1934, and the club had actively been seeking admission to the Association for the previous eight years.

Sunshine was a large club in a strong growth area of Melbourne's west, which operated two teams in the Metropolitan Football League (MFL) and three teams in the Footscray District League and had more than 200 registered players. It was runner-up in the MFL in 1958. It played its home games at Selwyn Park, which was up to Association standard and had a recently built £20,000 pavilion.

Sunshine's playing uniform in the MFL consisted of blue and white hoops, identical to Moorabbin's guernsey. The clubs were not drawn to play each other until late in the season, so Sunshine played in its hoops until July, when it switched to a navy blue guernsey with a white yoke, and plain blue socks.

== Rule changes ==
The Association reduced the number of players on the field from eighteen per side to sixteen per side from the 1959 season; the two wingmen were the positions eliminated from the game under the new system. Each team also had two reserve players. The change lasted for 33 seasons; it was not until 1992 that the Association returned to the national standard eighteen-a-side rules. The Association had previously played sixteen-a-side between 1912 and 1918.

== Home-and-away season ==
The home-and-away season was played over twenty weeks. As in 1958, the clubs were split into a north-of-the-Yarra section and a south-of-the-Yarra section for the fixturing: in the first fourteen rounds, each club played home-and-home against the other seven clubs in its section; then, each club played against clubs from the opposite section over the final six rounds. The clubs were arranged into a single combined ladder including both northern and southern teams, and the top four clubs then contested a finals series under the Page–McIntyre system to determine the premiers for the season.

== Ladder ==
Pos	Team	Pld	W	L	D	PF	PA	PP	Pts
1	Williamstown (P)	20	17	3	0	2159	1339	161.2	68
2	Sandringham	20	16	4	0	2064	1340	154.0	64
3	Oakleigh	20	16	4	0	2021	1364	148.2	64
4	Coburg	20	16	4	0	1983	1420	139.6	64
5	Moorabbin	20	15	5	0	2060	1266	162.7	60
6	Yarraville	20	14	6	0	1960	1351	145.1	56
7	Mordialloc	20	12	8	0	1878	1566	119.9	48
8	Port Melbourne	20	10	9	1	1861	1644	113.2	42
9	Brunswick	20	9	10	1	1746	1675	104.2	38
10	Box Hill	20	8	12	0	1596	1623	98.3	32
11	Preston	20	8	12	0	1502	1967	76.4	32
12	Dandenong	20	6	14	0	1618	1921	84.2	24
13	Sunshine	20	6	14	0	1329	2072	64.1	24
14	Northcote	20	3	17	0	1499	2276	65.9	12
15	Brighton	20	2	18	0	1365	2195	62.2	8
16	Camberwell	20	1	19	0	1041	2663	39.1	4

Rules for classification: 1) points; 2) percentage; 3) number of points for.
(P) Premiers

== Finals ==
=== Semi-finals ===
	Semi-finals
Saturday, 12 September	Oakleigh 7.14 (56)	def. by	Coburg 12.11 (83)	St Kilda Cricket Ground (crowd: 9,000)
Saturday, 19 September (postponed)	Williamstown	v	Sandringham	St Kilda Cricket Ground
Saturday, 26 September	Williamstown 11.14 (80)	def.	Sandringham 7.16 (58)	St Kilda Cricket Ground (crowd: 14,000)

=== Preliminary final ===
	Preliminary final
Saturday, 3 October	Sandringham 13.18 (96)	def. by	Coburg 14.16 (100)	St Kilda Cricket Ground (crowd: 22,000)

=== Grand Final ===
1959 VFA Grand Final
Saturday, 10 October	Williamstown	def.	Coburg	St Kilda Cricket Ground (crowd: 26,000)
2.8 (20); 6.13 (49); 6.14 (50); 15.21 (111)	Q1; Q2; Q3; Final	1.1 (7); 5.6 (36); 9.9 (63); 11.10 (76)	Umpires: Allen
Cullinan 7, Maloney 2, Mazouris 2, Callahan, Evans, R. Jones, Pelly	Goals	Byron 2, Carr 2, Jordon 2, Shaw 2, Goullet, Huntington, Matthews
Injuries	Gleeson (groin)
Cullinan, for striking Bigelow in the third quarter	Reports

== Awards ==
- The leading goalkicker for the season was Denis Oakley (Sandringham), who kicked 113 goals in the home-and-home season, and a further six goals in finals.
- The J. J. Liston Trophy was won by Bryan Waters (Dandenong), who polled 49 votes. Waters finished ahead of Kevin Dillon (Brunswick), who polled 38 votes, and Jack Coughlan (Oakleigh), who polled 32 votes.
- Port Melbourne won the seconds premiership. Port Melbourne 14.6 (90) defeated Moorabbin 12.13 (85) in the Grand Final, played as a curtain raiser to the firsts Grand Final on 10 October.

== Notable events ==
- Wednesday night football, which had been a feature of the early rounds of the 1957 and 1958 seasons, did not return in 1959.
- The Brunswick Council regraded the Brunswick Cricket Ground during the 1959 season, so the Brunswick Football Club could not play there. During the season, Brunswick's Firsts shared Northcote Park with Northcote, with the clubs playing home games there on alternate Saturdays. Considering the circumstances, Brunswick's Seconds team received permission to play at a different ground to the firsts, Allard Park in East Brunswick; confusion over this, particularly amongst southern teams, led to the Brighton Seconds team forfeiting its last match of the season to Brunswick because half of the team arrived at the wrong venue. The club trained on a reserve adjacent to its traditional home, which notably had no goalposts installed on it.
- Camberwell suffered the heaviest loss in its history to date, losing 1.8 (14) to 24.24 (168) by 154 points against Oakleigh on 20 June.
- The second semi-final between Williamstown and Sandringham on 19 September was postponed due to overnight rain making the ground unplayable. The VFA's contingency plan was to shift the game to Thursday 24 September, Show Day holiday, to avoid the need to extend the season and interrupt the St Kilda Cricket Club's preparations for the district cricket season; however, Williamstown and Sandringham successfully appealed to play the game on Saturday 26 September and extend the season by one week, on the grounds that it would have been unfair for the losing team to have only one day's rest before the preliminary final.

== See also ==
- List of VFA/VFL Premiers
