= Michael Gibbons (footballer) =

Australian rules footballer

Personal information
- Full name: Michael Gibbons
- Born: 15 May 1995 (age 31)
- Original teams: Lavington, Murray Bushrangers Williamstown (VFL)
- Debut: Round 1, 2019, Carlton vs. Richmond, at MCG
- Height: 175 cm (5 ft 9 in)
- Weight: 75 kg (165 lb)
- Position: Inside Midfielder / Medium Forward

Club information
- Current club: Carlton
- Number: 40

Playing career^{1}
Years	Club	Games (Goals)
2019–2021	Carlton	47 (35)
- ^{1} Playing statistics correct to the end of 2021.

Career highlights
- Norm Goss Memorial Medal: 2015; VFL premiership player: 2015; J J Liston Trophy winner: 2016, 2018; NSW State of Origin Team: 2020

Michael Gibbons (born 15 May 1995) is a former professional Australian rules footballer who played for the Carlton Football Club in the Australian Football League (AFL). He was recruited from Williamstown after he won two J J Liston Trophys, the best and fairest in the VFL.

== Early life and junior career ==
Gibbons began his football journey with Coolamon (NSW) before playing under 18 football in the TAC Cup with the Murray Bushrangers. Overlooked in the draft he moved to Melbourne to further develop his game. The versatile midfield-forward spent five years at Williamstown in the VFL. In that time, he became a dual J.J Liston Medal winner and Norm Goss Medallist in the 2015 VFL Grand Final.

== AFL career ==
=== Carlton (2019-2021) ===
Gibbons was recruited by Carlton as a supplemental rookie recruit in February 2019. He made his senior debut later that month in the opening game of the season against Richmond, and immediately established himself as a regular member of the club's senior team, primarily as a small/mid-sized forward, rather than the midfield position he had played at Williamstown. He signed a one-year extension contract for the Blues for the 2020 season as a rookie, and then signed to the club's senior list at the start of 2021. He missed only three games in his first two-and-a-half seasons, and kicked 35 goals in that time, before missing the latter half of 2021 with a hamstring injury. He was delisted at the conclusion of the 2021 season.

== Post-AFL career ==
Gibbons joined Yarrawonga in the Ovens & Murray Football Netball League for the 2022 season. After missing the 2022 grand final due to injury, he helped the Pigeons win the 2023 premiership and was named the H.J. "Did" Simpson Medalist as best on ground.

== Statistics ==
Legend
G	Goals	K	Kicks	D	Disposals	T	Tackles
B	Behinds	H	Handballs	M	Marks

Season	Team	No.	Games	Totals							Averages (per game)						
Season	Team	No.	Games	G	B	K	H	D	M	T	G	B	K	H	D	M	T
2019	Carlton	40	21	16	14	196	112	308	69	57	0.8	0.7	9.3	5.3	14.7	3.3	2.7
2020	Carlton	40	15	11	6	144	63	207	51	42	0.7	0.4	9.6	4.2	13.8	3.3	2.9
2021	Carlton	40	11	8	5	98	58	156	39	27	0.8	0.7	9.3	5.3	14.7	3.3	2.7
Career			47	35	25	438	233	671	159	126	0.7	0.6	9.4	4.9	14.3	3.3	2.8
