= Des Kennedy (Australian footballer, born 1944) =

Australian rules footballer

Personal information
- Full name: John Desmond Kennedy
- Born: 11 March 1944
- Died: 24 September 2023 (aged 79); Queensland
- Original team: Sandringham
- Height: 188 cm (6 ft 2 in)
- Weight: 92 kg (203 lb)
- Position: Follower

Playing career^{1}
Years	Club	Games (Goals)
1965–1970	St Kilda	56 (26)
- ^{1} Playing statistics correct to the end of 1970.

John Desmond "Des" Kennedy (11 March 1944 - 24 September 2023) was an Australian rules footballer who played with St Kilda in the Victorian Football League (VFL).

Kennedy, aged just 19, won the best and fairest award at Sandringham in 1963. He had played senior football with the Victorian Football Association (VFA) club since 1960 and was a member of their 1962 premiership team, kicking the decisive goal in a one-point grand final triumph.

A follower, Kennedy started his St Kilda career in 1965 and played in all 20 games that they played that season. This included the 1965 VFL Grand Final, where Kennedy ended up in the losing side. Although St Kilda broke through for their inaugural premiership in 1966, Kennedy was absent, having injured his knee in the semi-final against Collingwood.

He finished his career back at Sandringham and won "best and fairest" again in 1973. The following season he announced his retirement, with 101 VFA games to his name. He was inducted into the Sandringham Hall of Fame in 2014.

A son, Matthew Kennedy, played with both the Brisbane Bears and Brisbane Lions.
