= Mitch Hallahan =

Australian rules footballer

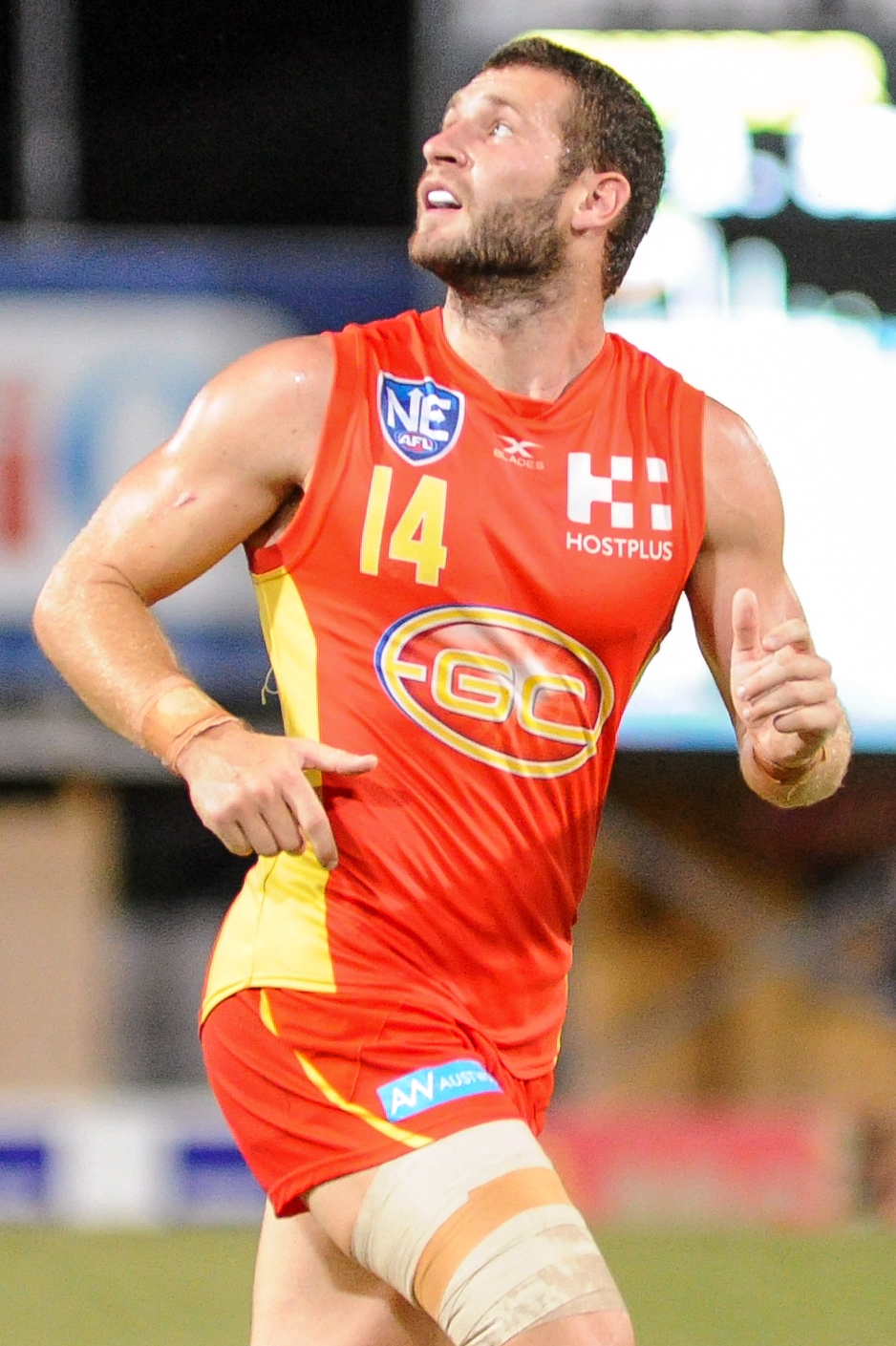
- Hallahan in May 2017

Personal information
- Full name: Mitchell Hallahan
- Born: 23 August 1992 (age 34)
- Original team: Box Hill Hawks
- Draft: No. 38, 2010 national draft
- Debut: Round 5, 2014, Hawthorn vs. Geelong, at Melbourne Cricket Ground
- Height: 183 cm (6 ft 0 in)
- Weight: 84 kg (185 lb)
- Position: Midfield

Playing career^{1}
Years	Club	Games (Goals)
2011–2014	Hawthorn	6 (2)
2015–2017	Gold Coast	20 (5)
Total		26 (7)
- ^{1} Playing statistics correct to the end of 2017.

Career highlights
- VFL premiership player: 2013; J. J. Liston Trophy: 2013; SFC Best & Fairest 2018,2019,2021; MPNFL Div. 1 Best & Fairest 2019

Mitch Hallahan (born 23 August 1992) is a former professional Australian rules footballer who played with the Hawthorn Football Club and Gold Coast Suns in the Australian Football League (AFL).

== AFL career ==
Hallahan was an all round junior sportsman, he learnt to box in a Rye gym. He won a state title in the Victorian cadet boxing championships. Hallahan was a co-captain of the Dandenong Stingrays team in the TAC Cup in 2010, but an ankle injury during the season caused a drop-off in form.

=== Hawthorn (2011–2014) ===
Hallahan was drafted by Hawthorn with the 38th selection in the 2010 AFL draft, and continued to struggle with his ankle injury during the 2011 season.

In 2012 and 2013, Hallahan played exclusively with Hawthorn's VFL-affiliate, Box Hill Hawks. In 2013 he won the J.J. Liston Trophy in a three-way tie with Steve Clifton (North Ballarat) and Jordan Schroder (Geelong), all on 17 votes.

Hallahan was selected to make his debut for Hawthorn against Geelong at the MCG on Easter Monday, 2014. He was named on the interchange bench.

=== Gold Coast (2015–2017) ===
On 16 October 2014, after struggling to break into the premier Hawthorn team during the regular season, Hallahan was traded to the Gold Coast Suns. Hallahan was delisted by Gold Coast in September 2017.

== Statistics ==
Legend
G	Goals	K	Kicks	D	Disposals	T	Tackles
B	Behinds	H	Handballs	M	Marks

Season	Team	No.	Games	Totals							Averages (per game)							Votes
Season	Team	No.	Games	G	B	K	H	D	M	T	G	B	K	H	D	M	T	Votes
2011	Hawthorn	38	0	—	—	—	—	—	—	—	—	—	—	—	—	—	—	0
2012	Hawthorn	38	0	—	—	—	—	—	—	—	—	—	—	—	—	—	—	0
2013	Hawthorn	38	0	—	—	—	—	—	—	—	—	—	—	—	—	—	—	0
2014	Hawthorn	38	6	2	4	42	63	105	18	24	0.3	0.7	7.0	10.5	17.5	3.0	4.0	0
2015	Gold Coast	14	12	3	2	134	94	228	38	56	0.3	0.2	11.2	7.8	19.0	3.2	4.7	0
2016	Gold Coast	14	5	1	1	45	44	89	6	16	0.2	0.2	9.0	8.8	17.8	1.2	3.2	0
2017	Gold Coast	14	3	1	1	32	33	65	13	11	0.3	0.3	10.7	11.0	21.7	4.3	3.7	0
Career			26	7	8	253	234	487	75	107	0.3	0.3	9.7	9.0	18.7	2.9	4.1	0

== Honours and achievements ==
Team

- VFL premiership player (Box Hill): 2013

Individual

- J.J. Liston Trophy: 2013
