= Jack Lowry =

Australian rules footballer (1916–2007)

Personal information
- Full name: Jack Brown Lowry
- Born: 25 November 1916; Lambton, New South Wales
- Died: 5 February 2007 (aged 90)
- Height: 180 cm (5 ft 11 in)
- Weight: 76 kg (168 lb)
- Position: Centreman

Playing career^{1}
Years	Club	Games (Goals)
1936–1938	Prahran	40 (17)
1938–1946	St Kilda	53 (7)
1946–1947	Sandringham	15 (43)
- ^{1} Playing statistics correct to the end of 1947.

Jack Brown Lowry (25 November 1916 – 5 February 2007) was an Australian rules footballer and cricketer, who at his peak played football with St Kilda in the Victorian Football League (VFL) and first-class cricket for Victoria.

A Melbourne High School student proficient at both cricket and football, Lowry began his careers with Prahran in both sports: the Prahran Cricket Club in district cricket beginning from the 1935–36 season, and the Prahran Football Club in the Victorian Football Association (VFA).

A quality all-rounder who averaged 40 with the bat and took 101 wickets at 24.1 as a spin bowler throughout his district career, Lowry was selected for Victoria in its non-Sheffield Shield first-class cricket fixture against Tasmania at the Melbourne Cricket Ground in 1937/38, scoring 62 in his first innings and being run out for three in his next. However, this was his only first-class match, and he was never selected to a Sheffield Shield match.

As a footballer in 1937 for Prahran, Lowry was a premiership player and won a VFA Medal as league best and fairest playing primarily as a centre, and occasionally as centre half forward. On the back of this effort, Lowry was signed by League club St Kilda, and he made his debut in the opening game of the 1938 season. He soon also made the switch from Prahran to St Kilda in cricket, joining St Kilda from the 1939/40 season.

Lowry spent just over eight years playing football at St Kilda. He was a star centreman when fit and available, but due to a combination of regular injuries and service with the Second Australian Imperial Force during World War II, he was limited to just 53 senior appearances. After playing the opening match of the 1946 season for St Kilda, he sought to leave and was cleared to VFA club Sandringham, where he was part of the club's inaugural premiership team at the end of that season.

Lowry retired from football in mid-1947 due to injury, as well as from district cricket after 131 first XI games. He continued playing subdistrict cricket as playing coach of Malvern for the next two seasons, before finishing his career playing cricket and occasional football for Mornington.

Lowry died in February 2007 at the age of 90.

== See also ==
- List of Victoria first-class cricketers
