= Bill R. Thompson =

Australian rules footballer

Bill Thompson

Personal information
- Full name: William Robert Thompson
- Born: 2 April 1949 (age 77)
- Original team: Alexandra
- Height: 183 cm (6 ft 0 in)
- Weight: 85 kg (187 lb)
- Position: Half back flanker

Playing career^{1}
Years	Club	Games (Goals)
1967–69	Essendon	17 (2)
- ^{1} Playing statistics correct to the end of 1969.

William Robert Thompson (born 2 April 1949) is a former Australian rules footballer who played for Essendon in the Victorian Football League (VFL) during the late 1960s.

Nicknamed 'Sherry', Thompson spent three seasons playing with Essendon and was a member of their reserves premiership winning team in 1968. He served in Vietnam after being drafted into the army.

The second stage of the half back flanker's career took place in the Victorian Football Association (VFA) and he captained Williamstown in 1975, his fourth and final season at the club. He crossed to Dandenong in 1976 and the following year won the J. J. Liston Trophy. A VFA representative, Thompson left the league after the 1979 season and continued playing throughout the 1980s with the Frankston Bombers.
