= Pat Fitzgerald (footballer, born 1936) =

Australian rules footballer (born 1936)

Personal information
- Full name: Pat Fitzgerald
- Born: 7 May 1936
- Original team: Sunshine
- Height: 179 cm (5 ft 10 in)
- Weight: 80 kg (176 lb)

Playing career^{1}
Years	Club	Games (Goals)
1957	Footscray	1 (0)
- ^{1} Playing statistics correct to the end of 1957.

Pat Fitzgerald (born 7 May 1936) is a former Australian rules footballer who played with Sunshine in the Victorian Football Association (VFA) and Footscray in the Victorian Football League (VFL). He won the J. Field Medal in the VFA's second division in 1961.
