= Jordan Schroder =

Australian rules footballer (born 1992)

Personal information
- Full name: Jordan Schroder
- Born: 5 December 1992 (age 33)
- Original team: Calder Cannons (TAC Cup)
- Draft: No. 54, 2010 National Draft
- Height: 182 cm (6 ft 0 in)
- Weight: 86 kg (190 lb)
- Position: Midfielder

Club information
- Current club: Essendon VFL
- Number: 56

Playing career^{1}
Years	Club	Games (Goals)
2012–2013	Geelong	5 (3)
- ^{1} Playing statistics correct to the end of 2014.

Jordan Schroder (born 5 December 1992) is an Australian rules footballer who played for Geelong in the Australian Football League (AFL).

Drafted from the Calder Cannons in the TAC Cup with the 54th selection in the 2010 AFL draft, Schroder made his debut for Geelong in the AFL in their Round 10 match against Greater Western Sydney.

In 2013 he was one of three players who tied the J.J. Liston Trophy. He tied with Steve Clifton (North Ballarat) and Mitch Hallahan (Box Hill Hawks) all on 17 votes.

Schroder was delisted by Geelong at the conclusion of the 2014 AFL season. He moved to Essendon VFL in 2015, and will have the opportunity to play for the Essendon seniors during the 2015 pre-season competition due to provisional suspensions being served by senior Essendon players during the club's supplements controversy.
