= Stan Tomlins =

Australian rules footballer

Personal information
- Full name: Stanley Crawford George Tomlins
- Born: 22 November 1923
- Died: 25 June 2004 (aged 80)
- Original team: Hampton Amateurs
- Height: 185 cm (6 ft 1 in)
- Weight: 82 kg (181 lb)
- Position: Key position

Playing career^{1}
Years	Club	Games (Goals)
1946–47	Sandringham	40 (74)
1948	Richmond	12 (23)
- ^{1} Playing statistics correct to the end of 1948.

Stan Tomlins (22 November 1923 – 25 June 2004) was an Australian rules footballer who played for Richmond in the Victorian Football League (VFL).

Tomlins, a Hampton Amateur, was the centre half back in Sandringham's 1946 premiership team, their first ever in the VFA. He spent a lot of the next season up forward and won the J. J. Liston Trophy.

After crossing to Richmond without a clearance, Tomlins made his debut in the opening round of the 1948 VFL season and kicked two goals. He managed bags of four goals in his next two games and also kicked five goal haul in round 15, against Melbourne. A shoulder injury, suffered that season, finished his career.

Throughout the 1960s until his retirement in 1971, Tomlins was a well-known umpire in Victorian country leagues.
