= Steve Clifton =

Australian rules footballer (born 1987)

Personal information
- Full name: Stephen Clifton
- Born: 27 May 1987 (age 39)
- Original team: North Ballarat (VFL)
- Draft: No. 1, 2011 rookie draft
- Height: 182 cm (6 ft 0 in)
- Weight: 84 kg (185 lb)

Playing career^{1}
Years	Club	Games (Goals)
2012	Greater Western Sydney	5 (1)
- ^{1} Playing statistics correct to the end of 2012.

Career highlights
- J. J. Liston Trophy 2010, 2013

Stephen Clifton (born 27 May 1987) is a former professional Australian rules footballer who played for the Greater Western Sydney Giants in the Australian Football League (AFL).

Clifton, who played his junior football with Lake Wendouree before graduating to the North Ballarat Rebels and then the North Ballarat Football Club in the Victorian Football League (VFL). In 2010 he tied with Shane Valenti of Port Melbourne to win the J. J. Liston Trophy.

He was recruited by Greater Western Sydney in the 2011 rookie draft, with the first pick. Clifton made his debut in round 16, 2012, against Adelaide at Sydney Showground Stadium. After five games he was delisted at the end of the season.

He returned to North Ballarat and in 2013 he won his second J. J. Liston Trophy, this time in a three-way tie with Mitch Hallahan of Box Hill and Jordan Schroder of Geelong.
