= Tommy Downs =

Australian rules footballer, born 1901

Personal information
- Born: 22 May 1901; North Fitzroy, Victoria
- Died: 11 August 1981 (aged 80)
- Original team: Northcote
- Height: 159 cm (5 ft 3 in)
- Weight: 65 kg (143 lb)
- Position: Rover

Playing career^{1}
Years	Club	Games (Goals)
1927–1933	Carlton	56 (44)
- ^{1} Playing statistics correct to the end of 1933.

Tommy Downs (22 May 1901 – 11 August 1981) was an Australian rules footballer who played for Carlton in the Victorian Football League (VFL).

Downs was a Woodham Cup winner at Northcote in 1925, having previously played with Preston.

One of shortest ever footballers at Carlton, Downs had a poor record at the VFL tribunal. He was suspended for 12 games in 1928 and 19 games the following season, both for striking. The former came in a Semi Final loss to Richmond when he kicked a career best four goals and the latter was in a Preliminary Final. Most famously however he received a 29-game suspension in 1931 when he was reported for kicking Richmond's captain Maurie Hunter. In a postscript to this incident, in 1954 teammate Frank O'Rourke admitted in a newspaper interview that he kicked Hunter.
