= Vic Aanensen =

Australian rules footballer (1953–2025)

Personal information
- Nickname: Stretch
- Born: 16 January 1953
- Died: 13 June 2025 (aged 72)
- Height: 198 cm (6 ft 6 in)
- Weight: 99 kg (218 lb)

Playing career
Years	Club	Games (Goals)
1970–72, 1977–82	Port Melbourne (VFA)	129
1973–1976	South Melbourne (VFL)	40 (30)

Career highlights
- J. J. Liston Trophy (1979, 1981); Port Melbourne premiership player (1977, 1980, 1981); Port Melbourne best and fairest (three wins); Port Melbourne Team of the Century

Vic Aanensen (16 January 1953 – 13 June 2025) was an Australian rules footballer who played with Port Melbourne in the Victorian Football Association (VFA) and South Melbourne in the Victorian Football League (VFL) during the 1970s and 1980s.

A ruckman, Aanensen started his career with Port Melbourne in 1970. He was recruited by South Melbourne for the 1973 VFL season, and played 40 games for the club before returning to Port Melbourne without a clearance.

Aanensen played 129 games for Port Melbourne in his two stints at the club. He won the J. J. Liston Trophy twice in his VFA career, in 1979 and 1981, and was a three-time best and fairest winner and three-time premiership player for Port Melbourne. In 2003, he was chosen as the second ruckman in Port's official 'Team of the Century'.

Aanensen died following a long illness on 13 June 2025, at the age of 72.
