= Ted Turner (footballer) =

Australian rules footballer (1921-1981)

Personal information
- Full name: Edward John Charles Turner
- Born: 20 December 1921; Elsternwick, Victoria
- Died: 23 September 1981 (aged 59); Frankston, Victoria
- Original team: Mentone
- Height: 179 cm (5 ft 10 in)
- Weight: 83 kg (183 lb)

Playing career^{1}
Years	Club	Games (Goals)
1944–1946	North Melbourne	16 (1)
- ^{1} Playing statistics correct to the end of 1946.

Career highlights
- VFA Representative Team: 1951

Edward John Turner (20 December 1921 – 23 September 1981) was an Australian rules footballer who played with North Melbourne in the Victorian Football League and for Brighton in the Victorian Football Association in the 1940s and 1950s.

== Family ==
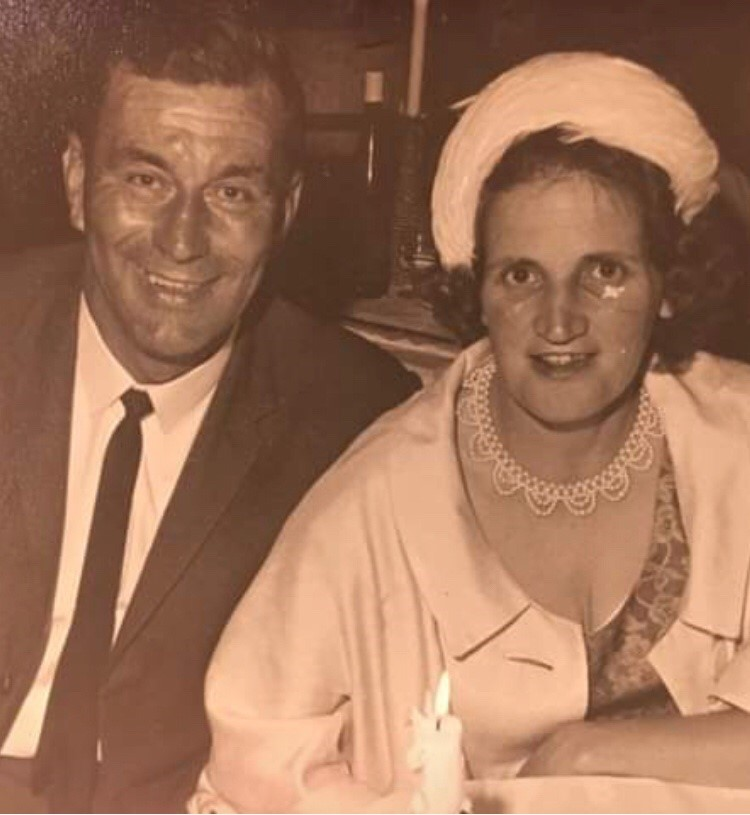
Ted and Nellie in the 1950s.

The son of William Hector "Wally" Turner (1891-1949), a veteran of English and Irish descent, and Emily Maria Turner (1889-1966), née Graham, née Phelan, also of English and Irish descent, with ancestors living in Tasmania as early as the 1820s, Edward John Charles Turner was born at Elsternwick, Victoria, on 20 December 1921. He was the youngest of their 5 children.

=== Marriage ===
After returning from the European front in 1944, he married Nellie Ann Casey (1923-2014), in 1944 at St Aloysius Catholic Church. Nellie, like Edward, was of a mix of Irish and English heritage. Her father was well-known horse trainer Sylvester Patrick Casey (1866-1950); and, through her mother's maternal grandmother, Eleanor Kate Thickins, née Beardmore, is related to British Industrialist William Beardmore, the major figure in engineering and shipbuilding who was later given the title of Lord Invernairn.

The couple had six children together, William (1945-), John (1948-), Maureen (1951-), Helen (1958-), Patricia (1960-) and Edward (1965-).

== Football ==
A centre half back, Turner made his League debut for North Melbourne during 1944. He played at North Melbourne until 1946, and played a total of sixteen senior games.

In 1947, he crossed to the Victorian Football Association and played for the Brighton Football Club until 1951. He was a member of Brighton's 1948 premiership team.

In 1952, Turner moved to the Frankston Football Club in the Mornington Peninsula Football League, where he served as captain-coach in 1952 and 1953.

He returned to Brighton as captain-coach in the VFA in 1954, and won the J. J. Liston Trophy as VFA best and fairest, winning by a margin of eight votes. He played with Brighton until 1955.

== Later life ==
After his football career, he worked as a plumber and a gas fitter.

== Death ==
He died suddenly at Frankston, Victoria on 23 September 1981, of heart related issues likely caused by his experiences during the war. He was outlived by his wife, 6 children and his grandchildren.
