= Neville Huggins =

Australian rules footballer and coach

Personal information
- Full name: Neville David Huggins
- Born: 11 September 1906; Wangaratta, Victoria
- Died: 29 December 1987 (aged 81)
- Original team: Rutherglen
- Height: 180 cm (5 ft 11 in)
- Weight: 87 kg (192 lb)
- Position: Ruck-rover

Playing career^{1}
Years	Club	Games (Goals)
1929	Fitzroy	4 (3)
1931–35	North Melbourne	86 (21)
Total		90 (24)
- ^{1} Playing statistics correct to the end of 1935.

Neville Huggins (11 September 1906 – 29 December 1987) was an Australian rules footballer who played for Fitzroy and North Melbourne in the Victorian Football League (VFL).

Huggins started his football career in the Ovens and Murray League where he took the field for Rutherglen. He then spent some time at Williamstown before being signed by Fitzroy for the 1929 VFL season. His stint at Fitzroy wasn't successful, ending after just four matches owing to a dispute with the committee. Huggins, a ruck-rover, was also a policeman by profession.

The North Melbourne team of the early 1930s was particularly weak and in his initial season with the club he didn't experience a win. It wasn't until 1932 that he played in a winning side, ending a streak of 22 consecutive losses, which stretched back to his time at Fitzroy.

Having left the VFL for good, Huggins returned to Williamstown, where he was appointed captain-coach and said to be the highest paid one in the country. A dual Club best and fairest winner in 1936 and 1937, he won the VFA Medal in 1936 and tied for it in 1937 and also took out the Recorder Cup in 1937. He also captained a VFA representative side against the VFL at St Kilda in May 1937. He was overlooked as captain-coach in 1938 in favour of former North Melbourne teammate, George Jerram, but was made vice-captain. He transferred to Prahran after round 8 of the 1938 season after suffering a knee injury and then crossed to Essendon in 1939 but failed to make a senior appearance. He played a total of 36 games for Williamstown and kicked 6 goals.

Huggins coached Shepparton Football Club in their 1940 Goulburn Valley Football Association grand final loss to Lemnos.

Huggins was known to be playing cricket for Shepparton Cricket Club in the 1939/40 season.

Huggins was vice-captain of the Border United FC that played in the Murray Valley Patriotic Football League in 1944.

Huggins was captain / coach of the South Corowa Football Club in the Coreen & District Football League in 1947.
