= Bryan Waters =

Australian rules footballer

Personal information
- Full name: Bryan Waters
- Born: 21 January 1938 (age 88)
- Original team: Dandenong
- Height: 178 cm (5 ft 10 in)
- Weight: 75 kg (165 lb)

Playing career^{1}
Years	Club	Games (Goals)
1956–58	Hawthorn	5 (1)
- ^{1} Playing statistics correct to the end of 1957.

Bryan Waters (born 21 January 1938) is a former Australian rules footballer who played for Hawthorn in the Victorian Football League (VFL) during the 1950s.

Waters originally played for the Dandenong Football Club in the Federal League, before joining Hawthorn in the VFL. He played with Hawthorn for three seasons, under the coaching of Jack Hale. After leaving the VFL, he returned to Dandenong, which was now playing in the Victorian Football Association, and won the 1959 J. J. Liston Trophy. His younger brother, Terry, was a Best and Fairest winner at Collingwood.
