= Alan Poore =

Australian rules footballer

Personal information
- Full name: Alan Charles Poore
- Nickname: Sammy
- Born: 7 July 1942
- Original team: Mentone
- Height: 179 cm (5 ft 10 in)
- Weight: 80 kg (176 lb)

Playing career^{1}
Years	Club	Games (Goals)
1961–1964	Collingwood (VFL)	11 (5)
1965–71, 1978	Waverley (VFA)	124
- ^{1} Playing statistics correct to the end of 1978.

Career highlights
- J. J. Liston Trophy (1965, 1966)

Alan Poore (born 7 July 1942) is a former Australian rules footballer who played for Collingwood in the Victorian Football League (VFL) and Waverley in the Victorian Football Association (VFA).

Poore had a brief career with Collingwood, remaining with the club for four years from 1961 until 1964 but never managing to cement a regular place the side, in part due to injuries suffered in a car accident in 1962. In 1965 he joined Waverley and was a member of their premiership side that season as well as winning a J. J. Liston Trophy. He won the award again in 1966 to become the first ever player in the history of the VFA to win it twice. A centreman, he was also a dual best and fairest winner at Waverley and in 1966 represented the VFA at the Hobart Carnival. He left the club after 1971, but made a brief comeback in 1978 at the age of 35. He finished with a total of 124 games for Waverley.
