= John Dowling (Australian rules footballer) =

Australian rules footballer

Personal information
- Full name: William John Dowling
- Born: 8 April 1909; Brunswick, Victoria
- Died: 10 January 1967 (aged 57); Kogarah, New South Wales
- Original team: Brunswick Juniors / South Yarra
- Height: 174 cm (5 ft 9 in)
- Weight: 75 kg (165 lb)

Playing career^{1}
Years	Club	Games (Goals)
1927–1931	North Melbourne	49 (79)
1932–1933	Footscray	17 (29)
Total		66 (108)
- ^{1} Playing statistics correct to the end of 1933.

William John Dowling (8 April 1909 – 10 January 1967) was an Australian rules footballer who played for North Melbourne and Footscray in the Victorian Football League (VFL).

Dowling played with North Melbourne between 1927 and 1931, topping their goalkicking in the 1929 season. He finished his VFL career at Footscray; midway through his second season with the club he was picked up by Brunswick in the VFA, who were struggling and sought experienced players.

Dowling won the 1934 VFA best and fairest award, the VFA Gold Medal and also the 1934 Recorder Cup award too.

Dowling won the 1935 VFA Gold Medal too.
