= Sandringham Football Club =

Australian rules football club in Victoria

Names
- Full name: Sandringham Football Club
- Nickname(s): Zebras, Zebs, Sandy

2025 season
- After finals: VFL: DNQ; VFLW: 6th
- Home-and-away season: VFL: 20th of 21; VFLW: 4th of 12

Club details
- Founded: 1929; 97 years ago
- Colours: Black Gold Blue
- Competition: VFL: Men's; VFLW: Women's
- President: Nick Johnstone
- Coach: VFL: Daniel Ward
- Captain: VFL: Anthony Seaton
- Premierships: VFA/VFL (10): 1946; 1962; 1985; 1992; 1994; 1997; 2000; 2004; 2005; 2006
- Ground: Trevor Barker Beach Oval (capacity: 10,000)

Uniforms
Home

Other information
- Official website: sandringhamfc.com.au

The Sandringham Football Club, nicknamed the Zebras, is an Australian rules football club based in the Melbourne suburb of Sandringham. It currently competes in the Victorian Football League (VFL) and the VFL Women's (VFLW).

Sandringham has competed in the VFL – originally known as the Victorian Football Association (VFA) – since 1929, and was one of only two clubs to not be relegated to Division 2 when the VFA was split into two divisions.

Sandringham men's side is a standalone outfit and is not affiliated with any other club. Between 2009 and 2025, the club had a reserves affiliation with Australian Football League (AFL) club St Kilda, and prior to that were affiliated with Melbourne. The club's women's side, which competes in the VFLW, retains an affiliation with St Kilda.

== History ==
=== Origins and formation ===
The first steps towards establishing a semi-professional football team from the Sandringham area were made in 1927, with the Black Rock Football Club (Black Rock Amateurs), the Hampton Football Club, the Sandringham Amateur Football Club and the Sandringham District Football Club discussing the viability of amalgamating to form a team in the VFA. The proposal failed after a meeting of club representatives on 17 February 1927 despite Sandringham Amateurs "unreservedly" favouring the concept, as Black Rock was unable to field a team, Hampton opposed the merger on the grounds of losing local identity, and Sandringham District wanted at least three clubs involved. All four clubs competed in the Metropolitan Amateur Football Association (MAFA) for the 1927 season. On 15 August 1927, four other clubs merged to form the Sandringham Football Club.

On 17 February 1928, Sandringham, Sandringham District and the Sandringham United Football Club amalgamated to form a new Sandringham Football Club. This was, however, effectively a continuation of the Sandringham Amateurs. The club entered two teams in the MAFA and one team in the Federal Football Association (FFA) junior competition for the 1928 season. The second Sandringham team in the MAFA (known as Sandringham B) withdrew from C Section in August 1928 after having a record score kicked against them.

Sandringham was told by the VFA in November 1928 that it would be admitted into the competition if it obtained permission to build a fence around Beach Road Oval; the lack of a fence had prevented the club from entering for the 1928 VFA season. In January 1929, the Sandringham Council supported a bid from an (apparently new) senior Sandringham Football Club to enter the VFA. The bid was successful, and Sandringham was accepted into the Association on 4 February 1929.

Despite the admission, the club still faced a challenge prior to its first game. Sandringham applied for the use of Beach Road Oval for its reserves team (Second Eighteen) on Saturdays, but Sandringham Amateurs − returning to the MAFA for the 1929 season − also applied for its use, having played at the ground for 20 years. Sandringham Amateurs requested for use on alternate Saturdays and during the week for training purposes, while Sandringham said its VFA bid would have to be abandoned if it did not have access to the ground. Ultimately, Sandringham Council choose to allow the Amateurs to continue using the ground. Sandringham's VFA reserves team instead played its home games at Tulip Street Reserve. The club wore the colours of gold, black and blue, taken from Sandringham Amateurs, Black Rock and Hampton.

=== VFA/VFL ===
In the club's first 10 years of existence, they achieved a season finish of no better than 5th place, which came in the 1933 season.

Sandringham recorded its inaugural premiership in the 1946 season, coming from behind late in the final quarter to record a 7-point win over Camberwell in front of 30,000 spectators. Though the club struggled throughout the 1950s, it has since gone on to record 10 premierships in total, being one of the most consistent teams in the VFL, their most successful period coming in the 2000s, with 4 premierships in 10 years cementing the club as one of the premier teams in the league.

The Zebras' home ground is and almost always has been the Beach RoadcOval, which was renamed the Trevor Barker Beach Oval in the 1990s after the death of Trevor Barker, who had coached Sandringham to the 1992 and 1994 premierships. Only in 1966 did the club change home grounds, spending a year at the Junction Oval in St Kilda before moving back to Beach Road Oval ahead of the 1967 season. From the 2018 season, the club will play three of its home games each year at Moorabbin Oval, and will wear St Kilda's black, red and white guernsey in these games.

The oval has a single grandstand (the Neil Bencraft Grandstand), a south end named after Nick Sautner (the Sautner Goal), and an administration centre (the John Mennie Administration Centre) – a social club and a capacity of 10,000. A record crowd of 18,000 attended the venue's first Sunday VFA premiership game, held between Sandringham and Port Melbourne Football Club in April 1964. A Rec Footy competition is also played at the ground.

=== AFL affiliations ===
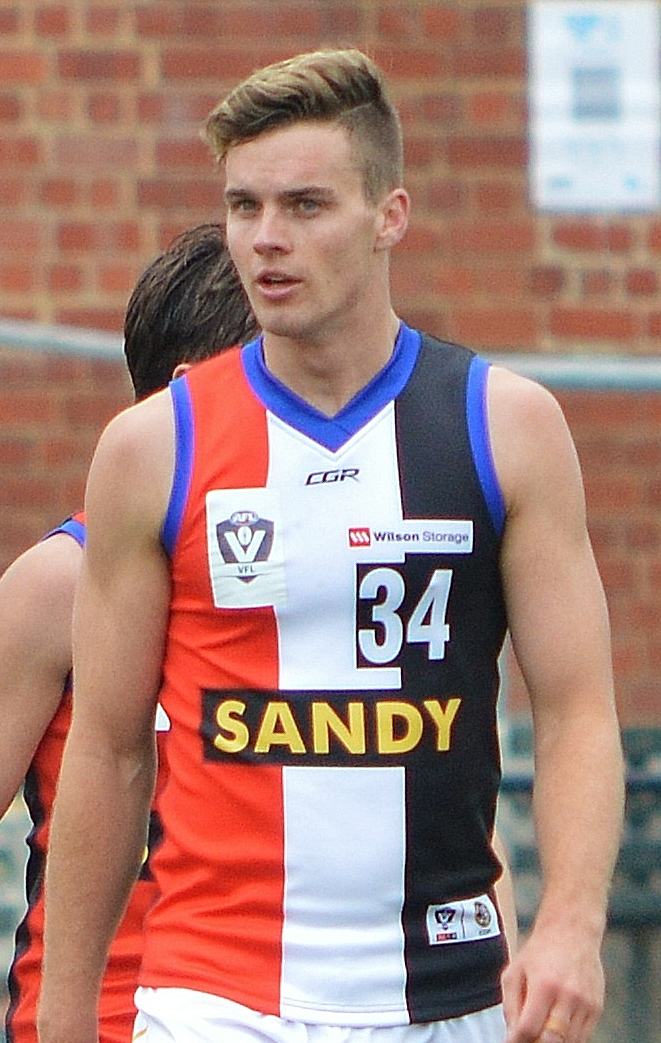
Sandringham's away jumper featuring St Kilda's colours, used from 2019 until 2025

For many years the Zebras had an alignment agreement with Australian Football League (AFL) club St Kilda, an arrangement which was in effect from 2009 to 2025. Previously, Sandringham had an alignment with Melbourne. Sandringham and Melbourne were the first two clubs to form an alignment. This Melbourne affiliation began in the 2000 season and produced fruitful outcomes for the club, with Sandringham winning the premiership in 2000, and a further three premierships in 2004, 2005 and 2006.

The St Kilda affiliation was extended in 2013 to the conclusion of the 2015 season, with a plan for both clubs would go their separate ways the following year. This led to Sandringham establishing a partnership with Victorian Amateur Football Association (VAFA) club Hampton Rovers. The affiliation was temporarily extended for the 2016 VFL season, before a new rolling affiliation deal with no fixed term was signed, to begin in 2017. The new deal changed the nature of the affiliation, expanding St Kilda's involvement in Sandringham's operation − including removing a stipulation from the previous agreement that no more than 14 St Kilda-listed players could play in Sandringham's senior team in any given match and Sandringham playing three games per year in St Kilda colours (beginning in 2019) at Moorabbin Oval, St Kilda's former home ground.

In October 2023, St Kilda announced that, beginning at the 2025 AFL rookie draft, it would use one of its rookie list places to draft a Sandringham player. However, at the 2025 rookie draft, which was held in November 2024, this did not occur.

The affiliation agreement ended following the 2025 VFL season. In 2026, Sandringham will field a standalone team in the VFL, but the affiliation will remain in place in the VFLW.

=== Women's football ===
Sandringham's affiliation with St Kilda extended to the VFL Women's (VFLW), when the club began co-managing a women's side in the competition with St Kilda in 2019. The team was called the Southern Saints and finished in 8th position in its first season. In 2020 St Kilda transferred the license ownership of the team to Sandringham, who assumed commercial and operational management of the team. In 2024 the club announced the Southern Saints brand would be discontinued and the team would be renamed Sandringham, aligning it with the men's side. Despite the St Kilda-Sandringham affiliation ending in the VFL in 2025, the alignment between the two clubs in the VFLW remains in place.

== Honours ==
=== Club ===
Premierships
Competition	Level	Wins	Years won
Victorian Football League	Seniors	10	1946, 1962, 1985, 1992, 1994, 1997, 2000, 2004, 2005, 2006
VFA/VFL Reserves	Division 1	9	1960, 1961, 1969, 1977, 1979, 1982, 1993, 1994, 2000
VFA/VFL Thirds	Division 1	10	1966, 1967, 1968, 1969, 1973, 1977, 1978, 1979, 1980, 1994
Other titles and honours
Lightning Premiership	Seniors	1	1979
Finishing positions
Victorian Football League	Minor premiership	6	1960, 1985, 1992, 1994, 2000, 2007
Victorian Football League	Grand Finalists	5	1947, 1960, 1963, 1977, 1995
Victorian Football League	Wooden spoons	5	1929, 1930, 1940, 1941, 1954

=== Individual ===
JJ Liston Trophy Winners (8)
1929 – Edward Bourke
1947 – Stan Tomlins
1962 – Keith Burns
1985 – Neil McLeod
1992 – Joe Rugolo
1997 – Justin Crough
2003 – David Robbins
2005 – Paul Johnson

== Seasons ==
Season	Win–loss	Finishing position	Finals
2009	7-11	10th	DNQ
2010	7-11	9th	DNQ
2011	6-12	10th	DNQ
2012	10-8	6th	Elimination Final
2013	6-11-1	11th	DNQ
2014	9-8-1	8th	Semi Final
2015	14-4	2nd	Preliminary Final
2016	10-8	7th	Semi Final
2017	8-10	11th	DNQ
2018	5-12-1	13th	DNQ
2019	6-12	12th	DNQ
2022	8-9-1	12th	DNQ
2023	5-12-1	16th	DNQ
2024	8-9-1	12th	DNQ

=== VFA/VFL Grand Finals ===
Year	Opponent	Score	Venue
1946	Camberwell	14.15 (99) - 13.14 (92)	Junction Oval
1947	Port Melbourne	11.8 (74) - 15.13 (103)	Junction Oval
1960	Oakleigh	8.14 (62) - 18.14 (122)	Junction Oval
1962	Moorabbin	14.10 (94) - 13.15 (93)	Junction Oval
1963	Moorabbin	9.12 (66) - 19.16 (130)	North Port Oval
1977	Port Melbourne	7.15 (57) - 23.19 (157)	Junction Oval
1985	Williamstown	14.16 (100) - 13.16 (94)	Junction Oval
1992	Williamstown	19.16 (130) - 13.8 (86)	Princes Park
1994	Box Hill	11.12 (78) - 10.9 (69)	Victoria Park
1995	Springvale	6.15 (51) - 14.10 (94)	Victoria Park
1997	Frankston	10.13 (73) - 5.14 (44)	North Port Oval
2000	North Ballarat	15.18 (108) - 11.11 (77)	Waverley Park
2004	Port Melbourne	9.13 (67) - 9.9 (63)	Princes Park
2005	Werribee	11.17 (83) - 11.8 (74)	Princes Park
2006	Geelong	13.13 (91) - 11.7 (73)	Princes Park

== VFA/VFL Club Records ==
Highest Score	44.20 (284) v Dandenong, Round 5, 1984, Beach Road Oval
Lowest Score	0.9 (9) v Williamstown, Round 11, 2018, Williamstown Cricket Ground
Greatest Winning Margin	206 points v Camberwell, Round 18, 1990, Beach Road Oval
Greatest Losing Margin	236 points v Port Melbourne, Round 19, 1941, North Port Oval
Lowest Winning Score	5.9 (39) v Frankston 5.8 (38), Round 20, 2003, Frankston Park
Highest Losing Score	26.12 (168) v Preston 28.7 (175), Preliminary Final, 1981, Junction Oval

== Notable former players ==
- Ian Cooper – St. Kilda. Best on ground in 1966 VFL grand final premiership.
- Bob Murray - St. Kilda
- Rex Hunt - Richmond, Geelong, St Kilda (1968-1978)
- Nick Sautner
- Chad Liddell
- Stan Tomlins
- Len Toyne
- Dallas O'Brien – 1983 Stawell Gift winner
- Michael Conlan
- Jeff Sarau - St. Kilda
- James Magner
- Jack Gunston
- Max Stokes
- Des Kennedy
