= 1987 VFA season =

106th season of the Victorian Football Association

- Date: 12 April – 20 September 1987
- Teams: 22

Division 1
- Teams: 10
- Premiers: Springvale; 1st D1 premiership
- Minor premiers: Port Melbourne; 14th D1 minor premiership
- Relegated: Geelong West
- J. J. Liston Trophy: Barry Round (Williamstown – 19 votes)
- Leading goalkicker: Ben Weatherald (Coburg – 73 goals)

Division 2
- Teams: 12
- Premiers: Prahran; 2nd D2 premiership
- Minor premiers: Werribee; 1st D2 minor premiership
- J. Field Medal: Peter Rogerson (Waverley – 19 votes)
- Leading goalkicker: Rino Pretto (Oakleigh – 96 goals)

Attendance
- Matches played: 186 (D1: 91; D2: 95)
- Highest (finals): 19,620 (D1 Grand Final, Springvale vs Port Melbourne)

The 1987 VFA season was the 106th season of the top division of the Victorian Football Association (VFA), and the 27th season of second division competition.

The Division 1 premiership was won by the Springvale Football Club, after it defeated Port Melbourne in the Grand Final on 20 September by 38 points; it was Springvale's first Division 1 premiership, won in just its fourth season in the first division. The Division 2 premiership was won by Prahran; it was the club's second Division 2 premiership, and the last premiership ever won by the club in either division.

The 1987 season was tumultuous on and off the field, with three separate clubs – Moorabbin, Geelong West and Caulfield – suspended from the Association at different times during the year.

== FORT review ==
In mid-1986, the Association organised the Football Organisation Review Team (FORT), which was tasked with reviewing the medium and long term structure of the Association and how it would fit within the wider Victorian football landscape. The FORT comprised: Association president and former Brunswick president Brook Andersen; former Association and Brunswick president Alex Gillon; North Melbourne CEO and former National Football League consultant John Adams; with consultation from state minister for sports and recreation and former Geelong player Neil Trezise. The FORT was given carte blanche to review how best to structure the Association into the future.

=== Context ===
The Association, particularly its weakest clubs, had been in decline for about a decade, struggling with the Victorian Football League (VFL) entering the Sunday football market, rising costs, loss of television coverage, reduced access to former League players, and demographic shifts in former heartland municipalities. The Association had been working since 1980 to improve its overall viability, having discussed various affiliation models with the League in 1980, and undergone restructures of the divisional system in both 1982 and 1984, but about half of the Association's clubs were still struggling and long-term viability was a concern to the Association executive.

The VFL was also going through dramatic changes which were altering the wider football landscape in Victoria. In October 1986, the League admitted newly established clubs based in Perth (the West Coast Eagles) and south-eastern Queensland (the Brisbane Bears). At the same time, as many as half of the League's eleven Victorian-based clubs were in severe or impending financial trouble: South Melbourne had moved to Sydney in 1982 due to its financial troubles, Fitzroy had fielded offers from Brisbane- and Canberra-based consortiums for a potential relocation in 1987, and St Kilda, Richmond and Footscray were all struggling off the field – in some cases, the clubs were solvent only because of the dividend they received from the multimillion-dollar licence fees charged to the new clubs, and from the proceeds earned when the Sydney Swans club was sold to Dr Geoffrey Edelsten in 1985. Thereafter followed wide speculation about further national expansion of the VFL, with expressions of interest from private consortiums, leagues and clubs in Adelaide, Canberra, Fremantle and Tasmania, and speculation that the struggling Victorian clubs would relocate, merge or fold. As such, the future composition of the League was very uncertain at the time, but it was considered realistic that within only a few years, the League could have expanded to a fully national competition, with a reduction in the number of Victorian-based clubs competing.

=== FORT recommendations ===
Map of clubs at the time of the FORT review. Teams shown with blue dots or arrows were included in the FORT's new Division 1; teams shown with red dots were excluded.
Note: the backdrop of this map is greater Melbourne ca. 2011; it includes roads and local government boundaries which did not exist until well after 1987

The FORT concluded that with the potential rapid nationalisation of the League, the Association would be well placed to take the position as the top state-based competition in Victoria, sitting underneath the League and serving as a development ground and reserves competition for its Victorian clubs – similar to how the West Australian Football League was organised underneath the West Coast Eagles. To do this effectively, the Association would be best structured as a single division of twelve strong, viable clubs, with promotion and relegation abandoned permanently. The FORT named its twelve clubs, based upon a number of off-field criteria including tradition, location, quality of facilities, and level of support from locals, councils and sponsors. The twelve clubs named were: from Division 1, Box Hill, Coburg, Frankston, Geelong West, Port Melbourne, Preston, Sandringham and Williamstown; from Division 2, Dandenong, Oakleigh and Prahran; and a new club based in Ringwood. Under the proposal, the second division would continue, but it would now be a suburban league operating under the auspices of the Victorian Metropolitan Football League, with no prospects of promotion to Division 1. The eleven clubs who were excluded from the FORT's vision were: Division 1 clubs Brunswick and Springvale; and Division 2 clubs Berwick, Camberwell, Caulfield, Moorabbin, Mordialloc, Northcote, Sunshine, Waverley and Werribee.

The FORT sought to implement this change by 1988, but needed a three-quarters majority from a vote of the Board of Management to achieve a formal mandate, which would have required several of the excluded clubs to vote in favour of their own exclusion. Springvale, which was undergoing a strong recruiting campaign which ultimately delivered it the 1987 premiership, and Sunshine, which had enjoyed a resurgence in recent years and was in the process of securing $350,000 from the council to upgrade Skinner Reserve, were both worried that the uncertainty generated by the FORT recommendations might jeopardise those ventures, so those clubs led the public campaign against the changes; within a fortnight, they claimed to have thirteen clubs onside to oppose the changes. By April 1987, Andersen recognised that he did not have enough support to get the changes through, and it was never formally put to the vote.

The FORT also recommended that the Association's Board of Management, which was the primary decision-making body within the Association, be restructured. Since the Association's foundation, the Board had been formed from club delegates, the consequence being that the Association could pass changes only if a majority of clubs voted for them. The FORT recommended an independent board comprising five delegates: three elected by Division 1 clubs, one elected by Division 2 clubs, and one from the VFL Commission. This would allow the Board to make more difficult decisions in the interest of the Association as a whole, rather than rely on clubs who could vote down changes on self-interest. The motion for an independent board was put to the vote on 5 May 1987, and fell one vote short of the three-quarters majority it required, with 17–7 in favour. A second vote was held in July, with the size of the proposed board expanded to six, but it this time it was comfortably voted down by a 10–14 margin. The independent board of management was eventually approved in March 1988.

=== Aftermath ===
Although the FORT's structural recommendations were never formally mandated, eight clubs left or were forced out of the Association within only 2½ years of the review, with most of those clubs placing part of the blame on the fall-out from the FORT review. Andersen and the rest of the Association executive made it clear that they were still strategically in favour of the FORT's vision, which created uncertainty about whether the second division had a future: Berwick and Mordialloc both saw this uncertainty as reason to withdraw from the Association and return to suburban football; and players and sponsors saw this uncertainty as a reason to abandon weaker clubs, severely affecting clubs like Caulfield. Many clubs also expressed bitterness upon their departures that they felt that the Association executive became more willing to allow weaker clubs to decline and fail without intervening, in order to allow the Association to progress naturally towards the FORT's vision.

Within only six years, the Association had contracted to the point where it almost matched the FORT's vision. The second division was abandoned at the start of 1989, and by 1991 there were only twelve teams remaining in the Association: ten were among the twelve clubs named by the FORT, with excluded clubs Springvale and Werribee surviving in place of Geelong West and the proposed Ringwood club. However, the VFL's national expansion and rationalisation of its Victorian clubs did not progress as far or as quickly as FORT had speculated: by 1994, all eleven Victorian clubs were still competing in the League, and only one new interstate club, the Adelaide Crows, had joined; and even as late as 2010 there were still ten Victorian clubs and only six interstate clubs. The Association ended up becoming the top Victorian state-level competition following an administrative change in 1995, but it was not until 2000, a full thirteen years after the review, that the Association finally fulfilled the FORT's vision of merging with the League reserves.

== Club suspensions ==
Three clubs were suspended from the Association at different stages during the year: Moorabbin, Geelong West and Caulfield.

=== Moorabbin ===
On Thursday 23 April, three days before Round 3, Moorabbin coach Graham Stewart resigned from the club over a number of disagreements with the board. The exact nature of the disagreements was not widely publicised, but they covered a range of areas in the management of the club and team, including player payments. Ten senior players immediately walked out in support of Stewart.

Lacking players willing to play, the club forfeited its Round 3 games against Oakleigh in all three grades. The Association issued an ultimatum to Moorabbin that if it could not field a team in all three grades, it would be suspended from the competition. Former Oakleigh premiership player Tom Quinn was appointed coach on 29 April, but the club was unable to coax enough players back, and it forfeited its Round 4 matches against Sunshine. As such, on 6 May, the Association executive committee suspended Moorabbin from the firsts and Seconds competitions for the remainder of the season; the rest of Moorabbin's games were treated as forfeitures. The club ultimately never sought readmission to the competition in 1988, and folded, bringing to an end a brief tenure of just over four seasons in the Association.

=== Geelong West ===
Although it was identified as one of the future Division 1 clubs under the FORT's proposal, Geelong West had been in decline throughout the 1980s. By 1987, the three local Corio District football leagues – the GFL, GDFL and BFL – were held in higher regard within Geelong than the Association was, meaning that local clubs attracted larger crowds and better sponsorship and could offer higher player payments than Geelong West. Additionally, many Geelong-based players preferred to play a Saturday afternoon game locally, rather than play a Sunday afternoon game and be required to travel to Melbourne every second week. Geelong West's minor grades had been suffering the consequences of this for many years – the thirds in particular had been routinely thrashed by more than 300 points since the early 1980s – but by 1987 the senior team was also suffering. After six weeks, the club was sitting winless in last place, was struggling to draw crowds and was in a poor financial position.

On Friday 29 May, the Geelong West playing group forfeited its Round 7 games in all three grades, seeking to make a highly public gesture to call attention to the club's ailing viability and lack of players. It was also speculated and reported that the players were striking over $15,000 in match payments collectively owed to the group at the time; it was confirmed that this money was owing, but the players denied this was the motivation for the forfeiture. The players had reportedly been planning the boycott for about a month before enacting it. The following week, a public appeal began to raise money for and encourage local players to play for the club, using the club's position as one of the city's most historically successful local clubs over a period of more than 100 years to gain support. On 10 June, the Association intervened: it gave the club until 30 June to prove that it was financially viable and could reliably field teams in all three grades, or it would face suspension for the rest of the year; and, the club was provisionally suspended until it could prove those two things.

The club's public appeal was successful in raising funds, and players including former Geelong West champions Joe Radojevic, Warwick Yates and Sylvester Kranjc were willing to play with the club to help it survive, even if it meant playing games on consecutive days: for their local clubs on Saturday and for Geelong West on Sunday. The final impediment was that a special transfer agreement needed to be signed between the Association and the local leagues to enable those players to make the weekly transfer between clubs beyond the normal transfer deadline of 30 June; this was agreed to, Geelong West's suspension was lifted, and the club returned to competition in Round 10.

Geelong West drew with second-placed Frankston in its first game back to gain its first points for the year, but it went on to win only one more game and was relegated at the end of the year. The club lasted one more season in the Association, before withdrawing after the 1988 season.

=== Caulfield ===
In the final round of the home-and-away season, Sunshine was scheduled to play Caulfield in the Association's first ever Friday night game at the newly upgraded Skinner Reserve. At the same time, as a result of its financial difficulties, Caulfield had fallen behind on its affiliation levies, owing the Association $8,125 (including fines) after missing payments in July and August; the club had no cash reserves with which to pay, and the Association indicated in the week leading up to the match that the club faced suspension as a result. The Association Board of Management determined that the Friday night match would go ahead, and that it would meet the following week to determine whether or not to suspend Caulfield; but, that it would reserve the right to apply a suspension retroactively, potentially stripping Caulfield of any points it might earn against Sunshine. Caulfield responded that it would not play the game unless the Association guaranteed that it would not apply a retroactive suspension; the Association did not give this assurance, so Caulfield forfeited the game, and was fined $1,500 as a result. Sunshine, which was angry with Caulfield after having invested money promoting the game, staged a match between the firsts and Seconds on the Friday night instead. Caulfield never played another Association game, as it was later suspended for the 1988 season, which ultimately ended the club's time in the Association.

== Division 1 ==
The Division 1 home-and-away season was played over eighteen rounds; the top four then contested the finals under the Page–McIntyre system. The finals were played at the Junction Oval.

=== Home-and-away season ===
==== Round 1 ====
	Round 1
Sunday, 12 April (2:10 pm)	Preston 16.20 (116)	def.	Brunswick 15.21 (111)	Preston City Oval
Sunday, 12 April (2:10 pm)	Box Hill 15.14 (104)	def. by	Port Melbourne 20.23 (143)	Box Hill City Oval
Sunday, 12 April (2:10 pm)	Sandringham 11.11 (77)	def. by	Springvale 22.21 (153)	Beach Road Oval
Sunday, 12 April (2:10 pm)	Geelong West 9.17 (71)	def. by	Frankston 21.19 (145)	West Oval
Sunday, 12 April (2:10 pm)	Williamstown 13.21 (99)	def. by	Coburg 16.17 (113)	Williamstown Cricket Ground

==== Round 2 ====
	Round 2
Sunday, 19 April (2:10 pm)	Coburg 14.17 (101)	def.	Box Hill 8.9 (57)	Coburg City Oval
Sunday, 19 April (2:10 pm)	Frankston 10.15 (75)	def.	Preston 8.14 (62)	Frankston Park
Sunday, 19 April (2:10 pm)	Springvale 20.14 (134)	def.	Geelong West 4.6 (30)	Springvale Reserve
Sunday, 19 April (2:10 pm)	Port Melbourne 20.14 (134)	def.	Sandringham 11.14 (80)	North Port Oval
Sunday, 19 April (2:10 pm)	Brunswick 14.12 (96)	def.	Williamstown 5.18 (48)	Gillon Oval

==== Round 3 ====
	Round 3
Sunday, 26 April (2:10 pm)	Preston 15.13 (103)	def. by	Springvale 24.13 (157)	Preston City Oval
Sunday, 26 April (2:10 pm)	Geelong West 6.20 (56)	def. by	Port Melbourne 23.21 (159)	West Oval
Sunday, 26 April (2:10 pm)	Box Hill 10.10 (70)	def. by	Williamstown 17.17 (119)	Box Hill City Oval
Sunday, 26 April (2:10 pm)	Sandringham 18.15 (123)	def.	Coburg 18.14 (122)	Beach Road Oval
Sunday, 26 April (2:10 pm)	Frankston 26.28 (184)	def.	Brunswick 15.17 (107)	Frankston Park

==== Round 4 ====
	Round 4
Sunday, 3 May (2:10 pm)	Williamstown 21.16 (142)	def.	Sandringham 10.10 (70)	Williamstown Cricket Ground
Sunday, 3 May (2:10 pm)	Springvale 12.17 (89)	def. by	Frankston 21.16 (142)	Springvale Reserve
Sunday, 3 May (2:10 pm)	Port Melbourne 18.14 (122)	def.	Preston 11.23 (89)	North Port Oval
Sunday, 3 May (2:10 pm)	Coburg 24.13 (157)	def.	Geelong West 13.12 (90)	Coburg City Oval
Sunday, 3 May (2:10 pm)	Brunswick 15.16 (106)	def.	Box Hill 10.15 (75)	Gillon Oval

==== Round 5 ====
	Round 5
Sunday, 17 May (2:10 pm)	Preston 14.10 (94)	def.	Coburg 8.21 (69)	Preston City Oval
Sunday, 17 May (2:10 pm)	Frankston 23.24 (162)	def.	Port Melbourne 9.12 (66)	Frankston Park
Sunday, 17 May (2:10 pm)	Sandringham 17.17 (119)	def.	Box Hill 12.17 (89)	Beach Road Oval
Sunday, 17 May (2:10 pm)	Geelong West 12.7 (79)	def. by	Williamstown 27.18 (180)	West Oval
Sunday, 17 May (2:10 pm)	Brunswick 15.7 (97)	def.	Springvale 12.18 (90)	Gillon Oval

=== Ladder ===
Clubs who won on forfeit were awarded a win and four premiership points, credited with the round's average winning score as 'points for', and debited the round's average losing score as 'points against'. The ladder as it is shown here distinguishes wins by forfeiture from wins in completed matches, but not all sources make this distinction.

Pos	Team	Pld	W	WF	L	D	PF	PA	%	Pts	Qualification
1	Port Melbourne	18	14	0	4	0	2414	1854	130.2	56	Finals series
2	Springvale (P)	18	12	0	6	0	2024	1511	134.0	48	Finals series
3	Williamstown	18	11	0	7	0	2141	1833	116.8	44	Finals series
4	Frankston	18	10	0	7	1	2033	1810	112.3	42	Finals series
5	Coburg	18	10	0	8	0	2183	1852	117.9	40	
6	Brunswick	18	8	1	9	0	1894	2041	92.8	36	
7	Sandringham	18	8	1	9	0	1875	2047	91.6	36	
8	Preston	18	7	1	9	1	1878	2065	90.9	34	
9	Box Hill	18	4	0	13	1	1672	1968	85.0	18	
10	Geelong West	15	1	0	13	1	1547	2529	61.2	6	Relegated to Division 2

Rules for classification: 1) points; 2) percentage; 3) number of points for.
(P) Premiers

=== Finals ===
==== Semi-finals ====
	Semi-finals
Sunday, 30 August (2:10 pm)	Williamstown 19.15 (129)	def.	Frankston 14.14 (98)	Junction Oval (crowd: 7,814)
Sunday, 6 September (2:10 pm)	Port Melbourne 12.9 (81)	def. by	Springvale 15.12 (102)	Junction Oval (crowd: 6,310)

==== Preliminary final ====
	Preliminary final
Sunday, 13 September (2:10 pm)	Port Melbourne 16.20 (116)	def.	Williamstown 14.12 (96)	Junction Oval (crowd: 9,282)

==== Grand Final ====
1987 VFA Division 1 Grand Final
Sunday, 20 September (2:10 pm)	Springvale	def.	Port Melbourne	Junction Oval (crowd: 19,620)
3.3 (21); 9.8 (62); 10.10 (70); 14.16 (100)	Q1; Q2; Q3; Final	2.5 (17); 4.8 (32); 7.15 (57); 7.20 (62)	Umpires: Casey, Morrow; Norm Goss Memorial Medal: Daryl Vernon (Springvale)
Dudley 3, Vernon 3, Mende 2, Nicol 2, Prosser 2, Anderson, Dunne	Goals	Hicks 2, Sneddon 2, Cooper, Harkins, Multimer
Vernon, for striking Coottee in the first quarter (ordered off); Mende, for striking McCormack in the second quarter	Reports	Coottee, for striking Prosser in the third quarter Harkins, for striking Anderson in the third quarter

=== Awards ===
- The leading goalkicker for the season was Ben Weatherald (Coburg), who kicked 73 goals during the home-and-away season and did not participate in finals.
- The J. J. Liston Trophy was won by Barry Round (Williamstown), who polled 19 votes; Round became the first player to win both a Brownlow Medal and a Liston Trophy since Des Fothergill in 1940 and 1941 respectively. Round finished ahead of: Mick Jennings (Port Melbourne), who was second with 17 votes; Mark Whitzell (Port Melbourne), who also polled 17 votes but was ineligible; and John Favier (Frankston), who was third with 16 votes.
- Preston won the seconds premiership. Preston 14.19 (103) defeated Brunswick 8.11 (59) in the Grand Final, held on Sunday 20 September.

== Division 2 ==
The Division 2 home-and-away season was played over eighteen rounds; the top four then contested the finals under the Page–McIntyre system. The finals were played at Junction Oval.

=== Home-and-away season ===
==== Round 1 ====
	Round 1
Sunday, 12 April (2:10 pm)	Camberwell 16.11 (107)	def. by	Werribee 19.18 (132)	Camberwell Sports Ground
Sunday, 12 April (2:10 pm)	Waverley 29.20 (194)	def.	Berwick 9.13 (67)	Central Reserve
Sunday, 12 April (2:10 pm)	Caulfield 20.25 (145)	def. by	Mordialloc 22.14 (146)	Princes Park
Sunday, 12 April (2:10 pm)	Sunshine 22.11 (143)	def.	Northcote 16.8 (104)	Skinner Reserve
Sunday, 12 April (2:10 pm)	Oakleigh 16.14 (110)	def.	Prahran 11.19 (85)	Warrawee Park
Sunday, 12 April (2:10 pm)	Moorabbin 17.6 (108)	def. by	Dandenong 25.22 (172)	Bentleigh Reserve

==== Round 2 ====
	Round 2
Sunday, 19 April (2:10 pm)	Dandenong 17.9 (111)	def.	Oakleigh 9.13 (67)	Shepley Oval
Sunday, 19 April (2:10 pm)	Prahran 7.14 (56)	def. by	Sunshine 13.12 (90)	Toorak Park
Sunday, 19 April (2:10 pm)	Northcote 13.18 (96)	def.	Caulfield 4.16 (40)	Northcote Park
Sunday, 19 April (2:10 pm)	Mordialloc 6.2 (38)	def. by	Waverley 17.21 (123)	Ben Kavanagh Reserve
Sunday, 19 April (2:10 pm)	Caulfield 17.7 (109)	def. by	Camberwell 22.11 (143)	Berwick Reserve
Sunday, 19 April (2:10 pm)	Werribee 17.14 (116)	def.	Moorabbin 5.11 (41)	Chirnside Park

==== Round 3 ====
	Round 3
Sunday, 26 April (2:10 pm)	Caulfield 13.11 (89)	def. by	Prahran 39.10 (244)	Princes Park
Sunday, 26 April (2:10 pm)	Sunshine 20.16 (136)	def.	Dandenong 14.19 (103)	Skinner Reserve
Sunday, 26 April (2:10 pm)	Berwick 10.13 (73)	def. by	Werribee 25.22 (172)	Berwick Reserve
Sunday, 26 April (2:10 pm)	Camberwell 37.23 (245)	def.	Mordialloc 7.15 (57)	Camberwell Sports Ground
Sunday, 26 April (2:10 pm)	Waverley 32.23 (215)	def.	Northcote 13.9 (87)	Central Reserve
Sunday, 26 April (walkover)	Oakleigh	def.	Moorabbin

==== Round 4 ====
	Round 4
Sunday, 3 May (2:10 pm)	Dandenong 22.30 (162)	def.	Caulfield 3.4 (22)	Shepley Oval
Sunday, 3 May (2:10 pm)	Northcote 13.16 (94)	def. by	Camberwell 27.19 (181)	Northcote Park
Sunday, 10 May (2:10 pm)	Prahran 18.12 (120)	def. by	Waverley 20.13 (133)	Toorak Park
Sunday, 10 May (2:10 pm)	Werribee 18.17 (125)	def.	Oakleigh 18.10 (118)	Chirnside Park
Sunday, 10 May (2:10 pm)	Mordialloc 25.10 (160)	def. by	Berwick 25.11 (161)	Ben Kavanagh Reserve
Sunday, 10 May (walkover)	Sunshine	def.	Moorabbin

==== Round 5 ====
	Round 5
Saturday, 16 May (2:10 pm)	Mordialloc 9.14 (68)	def. by	Werribee 18.20 (128)	Ben Kavanagh Reserve
Sunday, 17 May (2:10 pm)	Camberwell 15.10 (100)	def. by	Prahran 16.17 (113)	Camberwell Sports Ground
Sunday, 17 May (2:10 pm)	Waverley 9.17 (71)	def. by	Dandenong 19.18 (132)	Central Reserve
Sunday, 17 May (2:10 pm)	Sunshine 13.16 (94)	def.	Oakleigh 13.10 (88)	Skinner Reserve
Sunday, 17 May (2:10 pm)	Berwick 11.13 (79)	def. by	Northcote 14.10 (94)	Berwick Reserve
Sunday, 17 May (walkover)	Caulfield	def.	Moorabbin

=== Ladder ===
Clubs who won on forfeit were awarded a win and four premiership points, credited with the round's average winning score as 'points for', and debited the round's average losing score as 'points against'. The ladder as it is shown here distinguishes wins by forfeiture from wins in completed matches, but not all sources make this distinction.

Pos	Team	Pld	W	WF	L	D	PF	PA	%	Pts	Qualification
1	Werribee	18	14	1	3	0	2351	1513	155.4	60	Finals series
2	Waverley	18	12	2	4	0	2380	1464	162.6	56	Finals series
3	Prahran (P)	18	13	1	4	0	2510	1556	161.3	56	Finals series
4	Sunshine	18	11	3	4	0	2430	1690	143.8	56	Finals series
5	Oakleigh	18	10	2	6	0	2369	1497	158.2	48	
6	Dandenong	18	11	1	6	0	2486	1688	147.3	48	
7	Camberwell	18	9	2	7	0	2550	2073	123.0	44	
8	Berwick	18	4	1	13	0	1672	2556	65.4	20	
9	Caulfield	17	2	2	13	0	1531	2524	60.7	16	
10	Mordialloc	18	3	1	14	0	1582	2889	54.8	16	
11	Northcote	18	2	1	15	0	1578	2666	59.2	12	
–	Moorabbin	2	0	0	2	0	149	288	51.7	0	Club suspended

Rules for classification: 1) points; 2) percentage; 3) number of points for.
(P) Premiers

=== Finals ===
==== Semi-finals ====
	Semi-finals
Sunday, 30 August (11:10 am)	Prahran 19.18 (132)	def.	Sunshine 15.14 (104)	Junction Oval (crowd: 7,814 (C-R))
Sunday, 6 September (11:10 am)	Werribee 16.12 (108)	def. by	Waverley 19.11 (125)	Junction Oval (crowd: 6,310 (C-R))

==== Preliminary final ====
	Preliminary final
Sunday, 13 September (11:10 am)	Werribee 14.10 (94)	def. by	Prahran 19.11 (125)	Junction Oval (crowd: 9,282 (C-R))

==== Grand Final ====
1987 VFA Division 2 Grand Final
Sunday, 20 September (11:10 am)	Waverley	def. by	Prahran	Junction Oval (crowd: 19,620 (C-R))
2.0 (12); 7.4 (46); 9.7 (61); 14.14 (98)	Q1; Q2; Q3; Final	7.5 (47); 8.6 (54); 15.8 (98); 18.9 (117)	Umpires: Marshall, Vergona; ANA Best Player Award: Dale Tapping (Prahran)
Brewer 3, Brookes 3, Castillo 3, Burns, Hunt, Pearson, Rogerson, Vear	Goals	Giles 3, Bingham 2, Cutler 2, Hutchison 2, Reynolds 2, Soulos 2, Ellett, Hamilton, Tapping, Taylor, Walder

=== Awards ===
- The leading goalkicker for Division 2 was Rino Pretto (Oakleigh), who kicked 96 goals in the home-and-away season and did not participate in finals.
- The J. Field Medal was won by Peter Rogerson (Waverley), who polled 19 votes. Rogerson finished ahead of Luke Soulos (Prahran), who polled 16 votes. Votes won in the matches played against Moorabbin were excluded from the count.
- Werribee won the seconds premiership. Werribee 17.14 (116) defeated Dandenong 13.11 (89) in the Grand Final, played on Sunday 20 September.

== Notable events ==
=== Interleague matches ===
In 1987, the Association competed in and won the NFL Shield, the NFL's interstate competition among the minor states. It was the first time the Association had contested an NFL-sanctioned interstate event since its expulsion from the ANFC/NFL in 1970; the Association held a competition membership, but not a full membership, of the NFL at this time. Terry Wheeler (Williamstown) was coach of the team; Jeff Sarau (Frankston) was the captain, with Barry Round (Williamstown) stepping up in Sarau's absence against Queensland.

The Grand final against Tasmania was delayed for 35 minutes, because heavy fog prevented the Tasmanian team's flight from landing in Melbourne.

	1987 NFL Shield
Sunday, 10 May	A.C.T. 12.14 (86)	def. by	V.F.A. 13.16 (94)	Football Park, A.C.T.
Wednesday, 13 May (night)	N.S.W. 10.12 (72)	def.	V.F.A. 8.5 (53)	Lavington Sports Ground (crowd: 700)
Sunday, 24 May	Queensland 14.14 (98)	def. by	V.F.A. 25.16 (166)	Caloundra

	1987 NFL Shield Grand Final
Saturday, 6 June	V.F.A. 19.18 (132)	def.	Tasmania 16.7 (103)	Junction Oval (crowd: 1,500)

=== Other notable events ===
- Mitsubishi Motors withdrew as the major sponsor of the Association at the beginning of the year, and was replaced by ANA Friendly Society.
- Network Ten permanently ended its coverage of Association football at the end of the previous season. The ABC signed a deal to televise the Division 1 second semi-final, preliminary final and Grand Final in 1987.
- By 1987, the VFL was staging Sunday matches in Victoria on an increasingly regular basis, and some smaller Association clubs had suffered over previous years by losing fans to local Saturday competitions. As a result, Association clubs were given the option of playing games on Saturdays instead of Sundays from 1987: Berwick and Werribee both experimented with Saturday games during the season. This heralded the beginning of the end of the Association's time as a dedicated Sunday competition.

== See also ==
- List of VFA/VFL premiers
