= 1985 VFA season =

1985 VFA Premiership Season
- Teams: 22

Division 1
- Teams: 12
- Premiers: Sandringham (3rd premiership)
- Minor premiers: Sandringham (2nd minor premiership)

Division 2
- Teams: 10
- Premiers: Brunswick (3rd D2 premiership)
- Minor premiers: Oakleigh (3rd D2 minor premiership)

The 1985 Victorian Football Association season was the 104th season of the top division of the Australian rules football competition, and the 25th season of second division competition. The Division 1 premiership was won by the Sandringham Football Club, after it defeated Williamstown in the Grand Final on 22 September by six points; it was Sandringham's third Division 1 premiership, and its first since 1962. The Division 2 premiership was won by Brunswick; it was the club's third Division 2 premiership, and the last premiership in either division ever won by the club.

== Association membership ==
During the off-season, the Association's second division contracted from eleven to ten clubs, with Kilsyth leaving the Association. Northcote also temporarily left the Association, but returned prior to the start of the season.

Northcote

On 28 November 1984, the Northcote Football Club, one of the Association's longest-serving clubs, announced that it was withdrawing from the Association due to financial pressures. Northcote estimated its annual expenses to compete in Division 2 had increased to $85,000, including $16,000 affiliation costs. The club saw that increasing administrative costs, and upward pressure on player payments which had flowed on from a similar trend in the increasingly professional Victorian Football League had increased its expenses, but that the small and increasingly apathetic population of Northcote was no longer able to finance the club. Despite its departure, the club described its financial position as no worse than many other Association clubs, and predicted that other clubs would soon leave the Association for the same reason. Two weeks later, the club joined the Diamond Valley Football League, which it estimated had half of the operating costs of the Association.

Over the following two months, five past players keen to keep the club in the Association – Arthur Dearing, Ken Harvey, Chris Kozaris, Tom Martin and Dennis Viney – were voted to the Northcote executive committee. The new committee secured readmission to the Association on 12 February 1985. The new committee worked to cover the club's $18,000 debt by seeking new sponsors and attempting to form a coterie group. Additionally, the club gained some revenue from the League's Fitzroy Football Club, which had arranged a deal to train at Northcote Park (while playing home games at Victoria Park, Abbotsford), after having been evicted from the Junction Oval during the summer.

Kilsyth

The Kilsyth Football Club, which had competed in Division 2 for the previous three years with very little success, withdrew from the Association shortly before the season. As had been the case for Northcote, the club struggled with low revenue and high operating costs, and the club had considered leaving prior to the 1984 season for the same reason. As late as February, the club still intended to contest the 1985 season and had been included in the fixture, and it tried hard to attract strong local players from the Eastern District Football League to compile a competitive playing list; but it did not succeed, and withdrew from the competition before the season began. It returned to the EDFL in 1985 and remains there as of 2025.

Association structure

Four years after expanding the size of Division 1 to twelve teams, the Association decided during the season that the top division would be contracted back to ten teams from the 1986 season. As a consequence, it was determined that the 1985 Division 2 premiers would still earn promotion to Division 1, and that the bottom three from Division 1 would all be relegated.

== Division 1 ==
The Division 1 home-and-away season was played over eighteen rounds; the top four then contested the finals under the Page–McIntyre system. The finals were played at the Junction Oval.

=== Ladder ===
1985 VFA Division 1 Ladder
Pos	Team	Pld	W	L	D	PF	PA	PP	Pts
1	Sandringham (P)	18	16	2	0	2558	1578	162.1	64
2	Coburg	18	16	2	0	2403	1668	144.1	64
3	Preston	18	14	4	0	2452	1799	136.3	56
4	Williamstown	18	12	6	0	2236	1662	134.5	48
5	Port Melbourne	18	12	6	0	2251	1712	131.5	48
6	Geelong West	18	10	8	0	1766	1749	101.0	40
7	Frankston	18	8	10	0	1969	1821	108.1	32
8	Camberwell	18	6	12	0	1878	2450	76.7	24
9	Springvale	18	5	13	0	1532	2185	70.1	20
10	Prahran	18	3	14	1	1792	2525	71.0	14
11	Box Hill	18	3	14	1	1616	2566	63.0	14
12	Werribee	18	2	16	0	1761	2499	70.5	8

Rules for classification: 1) points; 2) percentage; 3) number of points for.
(P) Premiers

=== Finals ===
	Semi-finals
Sunday, 1 September (2:10pm)	Preston 13.15 (93)	def. by	Williamstown 16.8 (104)	Junction Oval (crowd: 6,713)
Sunday, 8 September (2:10pm)	Sandringham 32.16 (208)	def.	Coburg 19.14 (128)	Junction Oval (crowd: 9,014)

	Preliminary Final
Sunday, 15 September (2:10pm)	Coburg 17.16 (118)	def. by	Williamstown 18.13 (121)	Junction Oval (crowd: 6,243)

1985 VFA Division 1 Grand Final
Sunday, 22 September (2:10pm)	Sandringham	def.	Williamstown	Junction Oval (crowd: 22,341)
4.3 (27); 8.6 (54); 11.13 (79); 14.16 (100)	Q1; Q2; Q3; Final	4.4 (28); 8.6 (54); 10.10 (70); 13.16 (94)	Umpires: Fitzpatrick, Phillips; Norm Goss Memorial Medal: Mark Eaves (Sandringham)
Eaves 5, Brian Said 3, Mannix 2, Brewer, Gallagher, Kristensen, Morrison	Goals	Fotheringham 5, Rickman 3, Brierty 2, Davidson, Muschialli, Sait

=== Awards ===
- The leading goalkicker for the season was Ian Morrison (Sandringham), who kicked 105 goals during the home-and-away season, and 108 goals overall.
- The J. J. Liston Trophy was won by Neil MacLeod (Sandringham), who polled 22 votes. MacLeod finished ahead of Ross Gallagher (Sandringham) who polled 16 votes, and Brett Chadband (Port Melbourne), who polled 14 votes.
- Preston won the seconds premiership for the third consecutive season. Preston 21.17 (143) defeated Coburg 14.14 (98) in the Grand Final, held on Sunday 22 September at North Port Oval.

== Division 2 ==
The Division 2 home-and-away season was played over eighteen rounds; the top four then contested the finals under the Page–McIntyre system. The finals were played at Junction Oval.

=== Ladder ===
1985 VFA Division 2 Ladder
Pos	Team	Pld	W	L	D	PF	PA	PP	Pts
1	Oakleigh	18	16	2	0	2443	1595	153.2	64
2	Brunswick (P)	18	14	4	0	2224	1712	129.9	56
3	Sunshine	18	12	6	0	2041	1533	133.1	48
4	Caulfield	18	11	7	0	2000	1672	119.6	44
5	Moorabbin	18	11	7	0	1858	1682	110.5	44
6	Dandenong	18	7	11	0	2063	2002	103.0	28
7	Waverley	18	7	11	0	1825	1858	98.2	28
8	Northcote	18	5	13	0	1287	2217	58.1	20
9	Berwick	18	4	14	0	1412	1954	72.3	16
10	Mordialloc	18	3	15	0	1570	2498	62.9	12

Rules for classification: 1) points; 2) percentage; 3) number of points for.
(P) Premiers

=== Finals ===
	Semi-finals
Sunday, 1 September (11:10am)	Sunshine 15.11 (101)	def.	Caulfield 10.17 (77)	Junction Oval (crowd: 6,713 (C-R))
Sunday, 8 September (11:10am)	Oakleigh 16.12 (108)	def. by	Brunswick 25.18 (168)	Junction Oval (crowd: 9,014 (C-R))

	Preliminary Final
Sunday, 15 September (11:10am)	Oakleigh 17.16 (118)	def.	Sunshine 17.6 (108)	Junction Oval (crowd: 6,243 (C-R))

1985 VFA Division 2 Grand Final
Sunday, 22 September (11:10am)	Brunswick	def.	Oakleigh	Junction Oval (crowd: 22,341 (C-R))
8.6 (54); 13.8 (86); 23.13 (149); 25.18 (168)	Q1; Q2; Q3; Final	3.3 (21); 9.5 (59); 11.10 (76); 22.12 (144)	Umpires: Graeme Marcy, Walker
Flower 5, Gibson 5, Smythe 4, Judge 3, Thornton 2, West 2, Callander, Lawson, McDonald, Parsons	Goals	Pretto 12, Aldridge 4, Owen 2, Foott, Johnson, M. Roach, Todd
Reports	Aldridge, for striking Gibson in the third quarter
Brunswick led by as much as 82 points in the third quarter before Oakleigh narrowed the final margin to 24 points.; Rino Pretto (Oakleigh) kicked seven goals in the final quarter.

=== Awards ===
- The leading goalkicker for Division 2 was Rino Pretto (Oakleigh), who kicked 149 goals in the home-and-away season, and 170 goals overall. Pretto's total was the highest in a season by any player since Ron Todd kicked 188 goals in 1945 during the throw-pass era; it set and, as of 2019, holds the record for most goals in a season outside the throw-pass era.
- The J. Field Medal was won by Darren Hall (Dandenong). Hall finished ahead of Greg Packham (Caulfield), who was second, and Glenn Scanlan (Sunshine), who was third.
- Brunswick won the seconds premiership for the third consecutive season. Brunswick 17.17 (119) defeated Waverley 14.11 (95) in the Grand Final, played as a curtain-raiser to the Division 1 Seconds Grand Final on 22 September at North Port Oval.

== Notable events ==
=== Interleague matches ===
The Association played one interleague match during the season, against the Victorian Amateur Football Association. Gary Brice (who had returned Port Melbourne after a season at League club Essendon) continued as Association coach; David Brine (Preston) was captain. The Association no longer fielded a separate Division 2 representative team.

	1985 Interleague Matches
Sunday, 9 June	V.F.A. 14.13 (97)	def.	V.A.F.A. 13.10 (88)	Preston City Oval (crowd: 5,000)

=== Other notable events ===
- In December 1984, Alan Wickes, who had served as Association president since March 1981, declined to stand for re-election. Former Brunswick president and Brunswick and Camberwell player Brook Andersen was elected to the office in his place.
- The Association's order-off rule, which had been introduced in 1980, was amended in 1985. Under the original rule, the team played one short during the period that a player was ordered off the ground; but under the amended rule, the ordered off player could be replaced, meaning that the teams continued to play sixteen-a-side during the penalty.
- Berwick moved its home ground from Arch Brown Reserve to the Manuka Road Oval in 1985, following a clubhouse fire during the summer.
- Moorabbin moved from the McKinnon Recreation Reserve to the Bentleigh Recreation Reserve, its third home ground in three years.
- Camberwell endured significant financial hardship during the season. Despite having already asked its players to take a pay cut at the start of the season, the club remained unable to make its payments; in mid-June, led by one-time Association leading goalkicker Peter Stevenson and other key senior players Mark Turner and Robert Wilkinson, players began to walk out on the club. Within a year, more than forty players had walked out on the club, resulting in the club – which had played finals in 1984 – falling to a winless season in 1986.
- Oakleigh also endured financial difficulties during the year, and, with their consent, did not pay its players during the season.
- On 23 June, Williamstown 17.11 (113) defeated Preston 15.14 (104), ending Preston's club-record 23-match winning streak which dated back to 1984. It was also, quite remarkably, the first time Preston ruckman Neil Jordan had lost a game for the club in any grade across his 84-game career; he had previously played 34 matches for the thirds, 24 matches for the seconds, and 25 matches for the firsts without suffering a defeat.
- On 26 July, Oakleigh trailed Sunshine by 43 points early in the final quarter, before coming back to win by one point; Oakleigh 16.13 (109) d. Sunshine 15.18 (108)
- As in 1984, Network Ten televised one match in each of the final two weeks of the home-and-away season, followed by all of the Division 1 finals. Because of this, the Association made a decision to swap the Division 1 fixtures of Rounds 15 and 17, because ladder positions at the time indicated that there would be no interesting matches to televise in Round 17; this proved to be a wise move, as the top five teams won their originally scheduled Round 17 matches by an average of 105 points.
- Port Melbourne missed the finals in dramatic circumstances after a terrible performance in the final round of the home-and-away season. After Round 17, Port Melbourne sat fourth with a record of 12–5 with a percentage of 140.8, which was a substantial advantage over fifth-placed Williamstown with a record of 11–6 and a percentage of 133.1. In Round 18, Port Melbourne lost more than nine percentage points in a heavy televised loss against second-placed Coburg, Coburg 21.15 (141) d. Port Melbourne 5.9 (39); this allowed Williamstown to qualify with a comfortable win against sixth-placed Geelong West, Williamstown 14.16 (100) d. Geelong West 8.10 (58).
- Starting from this year, the Association played the Division 1 and Division 2 finals on the same days as double-headers at the Junction Oval, with the Division 2 matches serving as curtain-raisers to the Division 1 matches; this ended the long-standing practice of playing the Division 2 finals at a different venue (usually Toorak Park) and a week or two earlier than the corresponding Division 1 finals. The Seconds finals for both divisions, which had previously served as curtain-raisers to the firsts finals, were played as double-headers at North Port Oval. Under this arrangement, Network Ten televised the final quarter of the Division 2 final before broadcasting the entire Division 1 match.
- In the Division 1 Grand Final, Williamstown selected fourteen-year-old Ron James to play his first senior game.

== See also ==
- List of VFA/VFL premiers
