= 1993 VFA season =

Overview
- Teams: 12
- Premiers: Werribee; 1st premiership
- Runners-up: Port Melbourne; 17th runners-up result
- Minor premiers: Port Melbourne; 15th minor premiership
- Pre-season cup: Werribee; 1st pre-season cup win
- J. J. Liston Trophy: Michael Sinni (Prahran – 19 votes)
- Leading goalkicker: Jack Aziz (Werribee – 97 goals)

The 1993 VFA season was the 112th season of the Victorian Football Association (VFA), an Australian rules football competition played in the state of Victoria.

The premiership was won by the Werribee Football Club, after it defeated Port Melbourne in the grand final on 19 September by 42 points.

== Association membership ==
Leading up to the season, the Dandenong Football Club's financial troubles threatened to destroy the club. Its financial position had been weak since the 1980s; and the heavy spending which delivered it the 1991 premiership had worsened the situation, having not resulted in enough of a revenue boost to reverse the situation. The club was more than $220,000 in debt, including a $38,000 debt to the Dandenong Council which threatened its tenancy of Shepley Oval. Less than two weeks before the start of the season, the club succeeded in securing another lease for Shepley Oval. A few days later, the club announced a controversial plan to deal with its debt: it would liquidate the club, then immediately establish a new and legally distinct debt-free club which carried the same on-field team forward. The new club was known as Dandenong Redlegs Ltd, and the onfield team remained known as the Dandenong Redlegs, as it had been prior to the liquidation; a new guernsey, still incorporating its traditional navy blue and red colours, was adopted. Several other clubs were unimpressed with Dandenong's actions, worrying that it damaged the credibility of the Association clubs as a whole and would make it more difficult for them to obtain credit in the future.

== Administrative structure ==
In May, the clubs voted to disband the Association's Board of Directors, handing over complete administration of the Association to the Board of Management and streamlining the process by taking the clubs entirely out of it. Since the changes made in 1988, the Association had been administered by a six-man Board of Management which was elected by but independent from the clubs; but, decisions could be vetoed by a 75% majority vote of the Board of Directors, which comprised one delegate from each club.

== Home-and-away season ==
In the home-and-away season, each team played eighteen games; the top five then contested the finals under the McIntyre final five system. Finals were played at Moorabbin Oval, and the grand final was played at Princes Park.

== Ladder ==
Pos	Team	Pld	W	L	D	PF	PA	PP	Pts
1	Port Melbourne	18	16	2	0	2318	1584	146.3	64
2	Werribee (P)	18	13	5	0	2288	1563	146.4	52
3	Prahran	18	13	5	0	2254	1620	139.1	52
4	Frankston	18	12	6	0	2185	1551	140.9	48
5	Springvale	18	10	8	0	1784	1713	104.1	40
6	Box Hill	18	10	8	0	1852	1880	98.5	40
7	Sandringham	18	9	9	0	2042	1642	124.4	36
8	Dandenong	18	8	10	0	1898	2029	93.5	32
9	Williamstown	18	7	11	0	1497	1745	85.8	28
10	Preston	18	7	11	0	1619	1895	85.4	28
11	Oakleigh	18	3	15	0	1521	2559	59.4	12
12	Coburg	18	0	18	0	1321	2798	47.2	0

Rules for classification: 1) points; 2) percentage; 3) number of points for.
(P) Premiers

== Finals ==
=== Qualifying and elimination finals ===
	Qualifying final
Saturday, 28 August	Werribee 12.16 (88)	def.	Prahran 11.13 (79)	Moorabbin Oval (crowd: 1,786)

	Elimination final
Sunday, 29 August	Frankston 14.10 (94)	def. by	Springvale 17.17 (119)	Moorabbin Oval (crowd: 4,194)

=== Semi-finals ===
	First semi-final
Saturday, 4 September	Prahran 12.16 (88)	def. by	Springvale 14.16 (100)	Moorabbin Oval

	Second semi-final
Sunday, 5 September	Port Melbourne 11.25 (91)	def.	Werribee 11.14 (80)	Moorabbin Oval (crowd: 3,964)

=== Preliminary final ===
	Preliminary final
Sunday, 12 September	Werribee 14.14 (98)	def.	Springvale 14.11 (95)	Moorabbin Oval (crowd: 4,216)

=== Grand Final ===
1993 VFA Grand Final
Sunday, 19 September	Port Melbourne	def. by	Werribee	Princes Park (crowd: 14,389)
1.1 (7); 2.1 (13); 3.2 (20); 4.4 (28)	Q1; Q2; Q3; Final	1.4 (10); 4.6 (30); 7.9 (51); 10.10 (70)	Umpires: D. Agnew, M. Nash; Norm Goss Memorial Medal: David Allday (Werribee)
Bailey 2, Hicks, Stynes	Goals	Geary 3, Lamont 3, Button 2, McDonald, Raeburn
Chrimes, for striking Aziz in the first quarter Chrimes, for striking Lesiputty in the fourth quarter Chrimes, for striking Lesiputty in the fourth quarter Chrimes, for striking Wilson in the fourth quarter	Reports	Aziz, for elbowing Barlow in the first quarter MacPherson, for using abusive language towards emergency umpire McKernon; Rieniets, for striking King in the third quarter

=== Awards ===
- The leading goalkicker for the season was Jack Aziz (Werribee), who kicked 97 goals including finals.
- The J. J. Liston Trophy was won by Michael Sinni (Prahran), who polled 19 votes. Sinni finished ahead of David King (Port Melbourne), who was second with 18 votes; and Simon Clark (Springvale), Mark Lisle (Box Hill) and Paul Williams (Frankston), who finished equal-third with 15 votes apiece.
- The Fothergill–Round Medal was won by Adam Williams (Sandringham).
- Sandringham won the seconds premiership. Sandringham 11.13 (79) defeated Box Hill 5.7 (37) in the grand final, held as a curtain-raiser to the Seniors Grand Final on 19 September.
- Werribee won the inaugural pre-season competition. Werribee 29.21 (195) defeated Sandringham 14.18 (102) in the grand final, held on 11 April at Beach Oval.

== Notable events ==
- During the offseason, John Grieve was replaced as president of the Association by former Williamstown president Tony Hannebery. Grieve had served as president since April 1988.
- Three of the five games played on Sunday 20 June were decided by one point: Box Hill 13.15 (93) d. Prahran 13.14 (92); Oakleigh 17.16 (118) d. Coburg 17.15 (117); and, Springvale 9.17 (71) d. Williamstown 10.10 (70).
- On Sunday 15 August, Bill Swan (Williamstown) played his 301st senior Association game, passing the record set by Fred Cook (300 games) to become the games record holder in Association history. Swan finished his career with 302 games and held the record until passed by Ben Jolley in 2023.
- In the preliminary final, Werribee came back from a 17-point deficit midway through the final quarter to defeat Springvale. Jack Aziz, who also kicked the penultimate goal, scored the match-winning goal on the final siren with a set shot from 50 metres. The goal ended a strong season recovery by Springvale, which had lost its first five games before recovering to play finals.

== See also ==
- List of VFA/VFL premiers
- Australian rules football
- Victorian Football League
