= 1992 VFA season =

Overview
- Date: 11 April – 20 September 1992
- Teams: 12
- Premiers: Sandringham; 4th premiership
- Runners-up: Williamstown; 10th runners-up result
- Minor premiers: Sandringham; 3rd minor premiership
- J. J. Liston Trophy: Joe Rugolo (Sandringham – 19 votes)
- Leading goalkicker: Ian Rickman (Williamstown – 82 goals)

The 1992 VFA season was the 111th season of the Victorian Football Association (VFA), an Australian rules football competition played in the state of Victoria.

The premiership was won by the Sandringham Football Club, after it defeated Williamstown in the grand final on 20 September by 44 points. It was Sandringham's fourth top-division premiership.

== Home-and-away season ==
In the home-and-away season, each team played eighteen games; the top five then contested the finals under the McIntyre final five system. Finals were played at North Port Oval, and the grand final was played at Princes Park.

== Ladder ==
Pos	Team	Pld	W	L	D	PF	PA	PP	Pts
1	Sandringham (P)	18	15	3	0	2392	1638	146.0	60
2	Williamstown	18	13	5	0	1813	1361	133.2	52
3	Prahran	18	12	6	0	2128	1527	139.4	48
4	Werribee	18	10	8	0	1969	1628	120.9	40
5	Box Hill	18	10	8	0	1834	1537	119.3	40
6	Port Melbourne	18	9	9	0	1865	1995	93.5	36
7	Dandenong	18	8	10	0	1895	1719	110.2	32
8	Springvale	18	8	10	0	1677	1710	98.1	32
9	Preston	18	8	10	0	1776	2084	85.2	32
10	Coburg	18	7	11	0	1685	1812	93.0	28
11	Frankston	18	7	11	0	1714	2044	83.9	28
12	Oakleigh	18	1	17	0	1295	3008	43.1	4

Rules for classification: 1) points; 2) percentage; 3) number of points for.
(P) Premiers

== Finals ==
=== Qualifying and elimination finals ===
	Elimination final
Saturday, 29 August	Werribee 14.4 (88)	def. by	Box Hill 23.16 (154)	North Port Oval (crowd: 1,850)

	Qualifying final
Sunday, 30 August	Williamstown 17.11 (113)	def. by	Prahran 18.10 (118)^{Note}	North Port Oval (crowd: 3,652)

=== Semi-finals ===
	First semi-final
Saturday, 5 September	Williamstown 9.12 (66)	def.	Box Hill 3.16 (34)	North Port Oval (crowd: 4,875)

	Second semi-final
Sunday, 6 September	Sandringham 18.5 (113)	def.	Prahran 13.7 (85)	North Port Oval (crowd: 4,331)

=== Preliminary final ===
	Preliminary final
Sunday, 13 September	Prahran 5.7 (37)	def. by	Williamstown 7.16 (58)	North Port Oval (crowd: 4,485)

=== Grand Final ===
1992 VFA Grand Final
Sunday, 20 September	Sandringham	def.	Williamstown	Princes Park (crowd: 20,847)
6.3 (39); 11.4 (70); 15.13 (103); 19.16 (130)	Q1; Q2; Q3; Final	3.3 (21); 4.3 (27); 8.4 (52); 13.8 (86)	Umpires: K. Callaghan, John Russo; Norm Goss Memorial Medal: Joe Rugolo (Sandringham)
F. Rugolo 6, Gorozidis 5, M. Williams 3, Angus, Bailey, Ford, C. Garrett, Krakouer	Goals	Dwyer 3, Ghazi 3, Mitchell 2, Rickman 2, Lloyd, O'Connor, Williams

=== Awards ===
- The joint-leading goalkickers for the home-and-away season were Frank Rugolo (Sandringham) and Jamie Shaw, who each kicked 73 goals. For the whole season including finals, the leading goalkicker was Ian Rickman (Williamstown), who kicked 82 goals.
- The J. J. Liston Trophy was won by Joe Rugolo (Sandringham), who polled 19 votes. Rugolo finished ahead of Simon Clark (Springvale), Tom Snelton (Prahran) and Paul Williams (Frankston), who finished equal-second with sixteen votes apiece.
- The Fothergill–Round Medal was won by Julian Shanks (Williamstown).
- Frankston won the seconds premiership. Frankston 19.10 (124) defeated Preston 12.13 (85) in the grand final, held as a curtain-raiser to the seniors grand final on 20 September.

== Notable events ==
=== Interleague matches ===
The Association played one interleague match, against the Victorian Country Football League, during the 1992 season. The match was played as a curtain-raiser to the state-of-origin match between Victoria and Western Australia at the Melbourne Cricket Ground. Leon Harris (Werribee) was coach of the Association team and Tony Pastore (Williamstown) was captain; the VCFL was coached by Gerard FitzGerald, who two decades later became the all-time record holder for VFA/VFL premiership games coached.

	1992 Interleague matches
Tuesday, 26 May (4:45pm)	V.F.A. 32.7 (199)	def.	V.C.F.L. 15.7 (97)	Melbourne Cricket Ground (crowd: 32,152 (C-R))

=== Premiers Cup ===
During March, Dandenong and Werribee contested the Premiers Cup, a new (but ultimately once-off) sixteen-team knock-out competition featuring 1991 grand finalists from the VFA and the Victorian Amateur Football Association, and the premiers from twelve other suburban and major country football leagues in Victoria. The two Association teams faced each other in their semi-final, with Werribee victorious. Werribee then defeated future VFL club North Ballarat in the grand final, held at the Melbourne Cricket Ground on 28 March as a curtain-raiser to an Australian Football League match between Melbourne and Geelong; notably, it was the first football game played in front of the ground's newly constructed Great Southern Stand.

The results of games featuring Association teams are given below.

	First round
Sunday, 8 March	Dandenong 13.15 (93)	def.	Traralgon 11.8 (74)
Monday, 9 March	Werribee 17.17 (119)	def.	South Bendigo 7.9 (51)	Kyneton

	Quarter finals
Saturday, 14 March	Dandenong 17.12 (114)	def.	De La Salle 17.8 (110)	Frankston Park
Sunday, 15 March	Werribee 21.19 (145)	def.	Bell Park 7.5 (47)

	Semi finals
Sunday, 22 March	Werribee 22.13 (145)	def.	Dandenong 10.5 (65)	Frankston Park

	Grand final
Saturday, 28 March	Werribee 30.20 (200)	def.	North Ballarat 12.14 (86)	Melbourne Cricket Ground (crowd: 38,646 (C-R))

=== Other notable events ===
- After 33 years of fielding sixteen players per side, the Association returned to fielding the national standard eighteen players per side in senior and reserves games from 1992.
- The Association abandoned the practice of playing the ABC's televised match-of-the-round at the central North Port Oval, which had been the case since 1988, in favour of playing at the home team's normal home venue, due to the low crowds drawn to North Port Oval matches not featuring Port Melbourne.
- On 26 April, Preston 22.5 (137) defeated Williamstown 20.14 (134) after Preston's Anthony Cardamone – who had been brought into the team as an emergency and had spent the first half of the game on the bench – kicked a goal from 25m after the final siren.
- On 30 May, Sandringham 26.17 (173) defeated a remarkably accurate Preston 17.1 (103). Mark Sedgwick scored Preston's sole behind with a dribbled kick at the goals with ten seconds remaining in the final quarter.
- In the qualifying final between Williamstown and Prahran, Williamstown recovered from a 31-point deficit in the final quarter to tie the scores at 16.10 (106) at the end of regulation time, resulting in ten minutes of extra time (in two five-minute halves) being played to decide the game. It was the first time extra time had been used in a VFA finals match, and many present, including Prahran coach Brian Taylor, were unaware that the provision to play extra time had recently been introduced to avoid the need to replay entire finals matches.
- Overuse and inclement weather during the finals turned North Port Oval into a mudheap. The Association moved as many minor grade finals away from the ground as it could (playing many at Chirnside Park) and unsuccessfully attempted to shift the senior preliminary final to an AFL ground.
