= 1988 Adelaide Bicentennial Carnival =

22nd edition of the Australian National Football Carnival

Tournament information
- Sport: Australian football
- Location: Adelaide, Australia
- Dates: 2 March 1988–5 March 1988
- Format: Knockout
- Teams: 10

Final champion
- SECTION One: South Australia; SECTION Two: Northern Territory

The 1988 Adelaide Bicentennial Carnival was the 22nd edition of the Australian National Football Carnival, an Australian rules football State of Origin competition. Australia was celebrating its Bicentenary in 1988, so the carnival was known as the 'Bicentennial Carnival'. It took place over four days from 2 March until 5 March, and the matches were played at Football Park and Norwood Oval.

Ten teams were involved, including all the states and territories, making it the most heavily contested competition. They were divided into two sections. South Australia, Victoria, Western Australia and New South Wales were in Section One. Although, traditionally, Tasmania had enjoyed more success in the interstate arena than New South Wales, the latter had 22 VFL players in its squad compared to the island state's 15, which helped them obtain the final Section One spot.

Section Two was occupied by the Australian Capital Territory, Northern Territory, Queensland, Tasmania and two non-regional teams. The Australian Amateurs was one of those, a squad of amateur players from across the country's leagues. Finally, the Victorian Association representative team made up the remainder of the group, but selection for this team was not restricted to Victorian Football Association players. If a footballer, now competing elsewhere, had started his career in the Victorian Football Association—such as Terry Wallace, for example—then he was eligible to join the squad. The same rules applied to the other teams, so, if a Tasmanian-born player had started his career at West Perth, he could be selected for either Tasmania or Western Australia.

Attendances at the tournament were lower than expected, and overall the tournament ran at a $30,000 loss. The team was originally to have received a $40,000 prize, with incrementally lower prizes for all other states; however, these prizes were abandoned due to the operating loss.

== Results ==
Section	Winning team	Winning team score	Losing team	Losing team score	Ground	Crowd	Date
Section Two; Preliminary Stage	Northern Territory	19.20 (134)	Tasmania	10.8 (68)	Football Park	–	2 March 1988
Section Two; Preliminary Stage	Amateurs	14.12 (96)	Canberra	12.11 (83)	Football Park	–	2 March 1988
Section One; Semi Final	Victoria (VFL)	20.13 (133)	West Australia	10.13 (73)	Football Park	5,195	2 March 1988
Section Two; Preliminary Stage	Victoria (VFA)	17.10 (112)	Queensland	4.11 (35)	Football Park	–	3 March 1988
Section Two; Preliminary Stage	Northern Territory	11.19 (85)	Amateurs	8.9 (57)	Football Park	–	3 March 1988
Section One; Semi Final	South Australia	12.8 (80)	New South Wales	8.11 (59)	Football Park	5,755	3 March 1988
Section Two; Semi Final	Victoria (VFA)	18.20 (128)	Canberra	9.16 (70)	Norwood Oval	–	4 March 1988
Section Two; Wooden Spoon Play Off	Tasmania	11.16 (82)	Queensland	10.10 (70)	Norwood Oval	–	4 March 1988
Section Two; Final	Northern Territory	17.10 (112)	Victoria (VFA)	9.13 (63)	Football Park	–	5 March 1988
Section One; 3rd Place Play Off	New South Wales	10.8 (68)	West Australia	9.12 (66)	Football Park	–	5 March 1988
Section One; Final	South Australia	15.12 (102)	Victoria (VFL)	6.6 (42)	Football Park	19,387	5 March 1988

== Squads ==
Team captains and vice captains:
Amateurs: Dave Perry
Australian Capital Territory:
New South Wales: Terry Daniher
Northern Territory: Maurice Rioli (c), Michael McLean (vc)
Queensland:
South Australia: Chris McDermott
Tasmania:
Victoria (VFA): Barry Round
Victoria (VFL):
West Australia: Ross Glendinning

Amateurs
(AAFC)

Coach: Bernie Sheehy

- Bill Armstrong (Perth)
- Simon Beasley (Footscray)
- Bill Botten (St Mary's)
- Nick Burne (Old Xaverians)
- Peter Curtain (St Kilda)
- John Gastev (West Coast)
- Terry Holtzman (Swan Districts)
- Alex Ishchenko (West Coast)
- Ricky Jackson (Melbourne)
- Craig Kettlewell (Sydney)
- Sean King (West Coast)
- Paul Meldrum (Carlton)
- Geoff Miles (West Coast)
- James Morrissey (Hawthorn)
- Andrew Obst (Port Adelaide)
- Dave Perry (North Beach)
- Leigh Sprylan (East Perth)
- Mark Summers (Richmond)
- Dominic Spillane (Old Paradians)
Australian Capital Territory
(ACTAFL)

Coach: Brian Quade

- Brett Allison (North Melbourne)
- Adrian Barich (West Coast)
- Andrew Bishop (Ainslie)
- Russel Durnan (Ainslie)
- Craig Elias (Queanbeyan)
- Shane Fitzsimmons
- Brett Hannam (Ainslie)
- Phil Harper (Ainslie)
- Geoff Hocking (Carlton)
- Geoff James
- Michael Kennedy
  (Brisbane)
- Mark Killer (Ainslie)
- Terry Libbis (Eastlake)
- Mark McClelland
- Michael Richardson (Ainslie)
- Wayne Rogers (Ainslie)
- Peter Scully
- Shaun Smith (North Melbourne)
- Barry Suckling (Queanbeyan)
- Mark Thompson (Queanbeyan)
- Michael Werner (West Torrens)
- Tony Wynd (Queanbeyan)
New South Wales
(NSWAFL)

Coach: Tom Hafey

- Phil Bradmore (West Perth)
- Billy Brownless (Geelong)
- Michael Byrne
- Dennis Carroll (Sydney)
- Glenn Coleman
- Neil Cordy (Sydney)
- Terry Daniher (Essendon)
- Paul Hawke (Collingwood)
- David Honybun
- Max Kruse
- Scott Morphett (West Torrens)
- Tony Morwood (Sydney)
- David Murphy (Sydney)
- Mark O'Donoghue (North Melbourne)
- Michael Phyland (Sydney)
- Terry Thripp (Sydney)
- Stephen Wright (Sydney)
- Brett Yorgey (Perth)
Northern Territory
(NTFL)

Coach: John Taylor

- Maurice Rioli (South Fremantle)
- Joe Ah Mat (Swan Districts)
- Michael Athanasiou (Nightcliff)
- Damien Berto (St Kilda)
- William (Ninny) Briston (Darwin)
- Greg Bruce (Darwin)
- Roy Cassetti (St Mary's)
- Kevin Caton (West Coast)
- Eddie Cubillo (St Mary's)
- Cadji Dunn (St Mary's)
- Dennis Dunn (St Mary's)
- Rohan Helyar (Norwood)
- Brentley Hughes (Southern Districts)
- Russell Jeffrey (St Kilda)
- Bob Jones (St Kilda)
- Teddy Liddy (St Mary's)
- Bruno Long (St Mary's)
- Michael Long (St Mary's)
- Peter McGann (Nightcliff)
- Michael McLean (Footscray)
- Adrian Moscheni (St Mary's)
- Mark Motlop (Nightcliff)
- Paul Motlop (Nightcliff)
- Kelly O'Donnell (Melbourne)
- Cyril Rioli Sr. (St Mary's)
- Willie Rioli Sr. (Tiwi)
- William Roe (St Mary's)
- Tony Vigona Jabiru
- Kevin Wanganeen (Wanderers)
- Lance White (Pioneer)
Queensland
(QAFL)

Coach: Peter Knights

- Cameron Buchanen (Windsor-Zillmere)
- Darren Carlson (Brisbane)
- Jason Cotter (Southport)
- Gavin Crosisca (Collingwood)
- Craig Crowley (Collingwood)
- Frank Dunell (Brisbane)
- Jason Dunstall (Hawthorn)
- Michael Gibson (Brisbane)
- Stuart Glascott (Brisbane)
- John Glynn (Southport)
- Jason Grimley (Wilston Grange)
- Carl Herbert (Mayne)
- Robert Mace (Brisbane)
- Mark Maclure (Carlton)
- Ross McIvor (Brisbane)
- Scott McIvor (Brisbane)
- Kevin O'Keefe (Coorparoo)
- Terry O'Neill (Coorparoo)
- Peter Riewoldt (Southport)
- Ray Sarcevic (Kedron)
- Jim Sewell
- Trevor Spencer (Essendon)
- Tony Smith (Sydney)
- Brenton Tapp (Mayne)
- Zane Taylor (Southport)
- Paul Ugle
- Dean Warren (Wilston Grange)
- Rod Willet (Subiaco)

South Australia
(SANFL)

Coach: Graham Cornes

- Chris McDermott (Glenelg)
- Stephen Kernahan (Carlton)
- John Platten (Hawthorn)
- Craig Bradley (Carlton)
- Tony Hall (Hawthorn)
- Tony McGuinness (Footscray)
- Mark Naley (Carlton)
- Michael Aish (Norwood)
- Bruce Lindner (Geelong)
- Mark Mickan (Brisbane)
- Andrew Payze (West Torrens)
- Matthew Campbell (Brisbane)
- Steven Stretch (Melbourne)
- Andrew Rogers (Essendon)
- Danny Hughes (Melbourne)
- Martin Leslie (Port Adelaide)
- Greg Whittlesea (Sturt)
- Scott Salisbury (Glenelg)
- Russell Johnston (Port Adelaide)
- Garry McIntosh (Norwood)
- Andrew Jarman (North Adelaide)
- Peter Bubner (Central District)
Tasmania
(TFL)

Coach: Robert Shaw

- Matthew Armstrong (Fitzroy)
- Simon Atkins (Footscray)
- Doug Barwick (Collingwood)
- Scott Clayton (Fitzroy)
- Rodney Eade (Brisbane)
- Michael Gale (Fitzroy)
- David Grant (St Kilda)
- Steve Goulding (North Launceston)
- Alastair Lynch (Fitzroy)
- James Manson (Collingwood)
- Stephen MacPherson (Footscray)
- John McCarthy (North Melbourne)
- Simon Minton-Connell (Carlton)
- Robert Neal (St Kilda)
- Stephen Nichols (Woodville)
- Michael Parsons (Sydney)
- Ian Paton (South Launceston)
- David Pearce (Glenorchy)
- Bradley Plain (Essendon)
- Darrin Pritchard (Hawthorn)
- Michael Roach (Richmond)
- Colin Robertson (Burnie)
- Chris Riewoldt (Clarence)
- Justin Stubbs (Essendon)
- Michael Templeton (Brisbane)
- Michael Webster (Hobart)
- Shane Williams (Footscray)
Victoria
(VFA)

Coach: Terry Wheeler

- Barry Round (Williamstown)
- Terry Wallace (Richmond)
- Paul Dudley (Springvale)
- Allen Eade (Coburg)
- Alan Ezard (Essendon)
- Ron James (Footscray)
- Adrian Marcon (Preston)
- Fraser Murphy (Carlton)
- Grant O'Riley (Fitzroy)
- Tony Pastore (Williamstown)
- Jeff Sarau (Frankston)
- Gary Sheldon (Coburg)
Victoria
(VFL)

Coach: Bill Goggin

- Tom Alvin (Carlton)
- Andrew Bews (Geelong)
- David Bolton (Sydney)
- Mark Bos (Geelong)
- Dermott Brereton (Hawthorn)
- Peter Daicos (Collingwood)
- Robert DiPierdomenico (Hawthorn)
- Danny Frawley (St Kilda)
- Leon Harris (Fitzroy)
- Gerard Healy (Sydney)
- Chris Langford (Hawthorn)
- Simon Madden (Essendon)
- Chris Mew (Hawthorn)
- Russell Morris (Hawthorn)
- Richard Osborne (Fitzroy)
- Gary Pert (Fitzroy)
- Paul Roos (Fitzroy)
- Brian Royal (Footscray)
- Paul Salmon (Essendon)
- Stephen Silvagni (Carlton)
- Ross Smith (North Melbourne)
- Tim Watson (Essendon)
- Dale Weightman (Richmond)
- Greg Williams (Carlton)
West Australia
(WAFL)

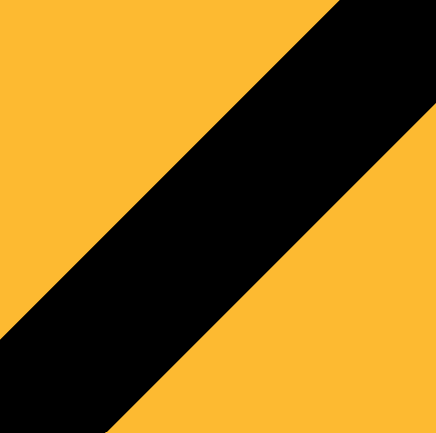

- John Annear (West Coast)
- Mark Bairstow (Geelong)
- Peter Bosustow (Perth)
- Gary Buckenara (Hawthorn)
- Joe Cormack (West Coast)
- Warren Dean (Melbourne)
- Richard Dennis (Carlton)
- Jon Dorotich (Carlton)
- Ross Glendinning (West Coast)
- Brad Hardie (Brisbane)
- Wayne Henwood (Sydney)
- Dean Laidley (West Coast)
- Dwayne Lamb (West Coast)
- Karl Langdon (West Coast)
- Andrew Lockyer (West Coast)
- Chris Mainwaring (West Coast)
- Steve Malaxos (West Coast)
- Paul Mifka (West Coast)
- Mike Richardson (Brisbane)
- Phil Scott (West Coast)
- Earl Spalding (Melbourne)
- Craig Starcevich (Collingwood)
- Nicky Winmar (St Kilda)
- John Worsfold (West Coast)
- Murray Wrensted (West Coast)
- Mark Zanotti (West Coast)

== Honours ==
=== All-Australians ===
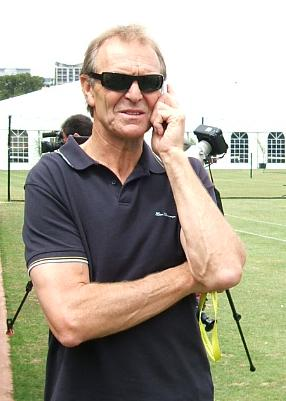
All-Australian coach Graham Cornes

1988 All-Australian Team
Name	Football League	State/Territory	Football Club
Terry Daniher	NSWAFL	New South Wales	Essendon Bombers
David Murphy	NSWAFL	New South Wales	Sydney Swans
Michael Long	NTFL	Northern Territory	St Mary's Saints
Michael McLean	NTFL	Northern Territory	Footscray Bulldogs
Maurice Rioli	NTFL	Northern Territory	St Mary's Saints
Tony Hall	SANFL	South Australia	Glenelg Tigers
Danny Hughes	SANFL	South Australia	Melbourne Demons
Stephen Kernahan	SANFL	South Australia	Carlton Blues
Martin Leslie	SANFL	South Australia	Port Adelaide Magpies
Bruce Lindner	SANFL	South Australia	Geelong Cats
Tony McGuinness	SANFL	South Australia	Footscray Bulldogs
Mark Mickan	SANFL	South Australia	Brisbane Bears
John Platten	SANFL	South Australia	Hawthorn Hawks
Greg Whittlesea	SANFL	South Australia	Sturt Double Blues
Graham Cornes	SANFL	South Australia	Glenelg Tigers (Coach)
Terry Wallace	VFA	Victoria	Richmond Tigers
Danny Frawley	VFL	Victoria	St Kilda Saints
Gerard Healy	VFL	Victoria	Sydney Swans
Simon Madden	VFL	Victoria	Essendon Bombers
Paul Roos	VFL	Victoria	Fitzroy Lions
Paul Salmon	VFL	Victoria	Essendon Bombers
Dale Weightman	VFL	Victoria	Richmond Tigers
Steve Malaxos	WAFL	Western Australia	West Coast Eagles

=== Leading goal-kickers ===
- Dennis Dunn (NT) – 16 goals
- Michael Long (NT) – 9 goals
- Stephen Kernahan (SA) – 8 goals
- Stephen Nichols (TAS) – 8 goals
- Paul Salmon (VIC) – 8 goals
- Bruce Lindner (SA) – 6 goals

=== Medalists ===
Fos Williams Medals

- Stephen Kernahan (SA)
- Mark Mickan (SA)

Simpson Medal

- Dwayne Lamb (WA)

Tassie Medal

- Paul Salmon (VIC (VFL))

Dolphin Medal

- Terry Wallace (VIC (VFA))
