= 1988 VFA season =

107th season of the Victorian Football Association

- Date: 10 April – 18 September 1988
- Teams: 16

Division 1
- Teams: 10
- Premiers: Coburg; 5th D1 premiership
- Minor premiers: Coburg; 7th D1 minor premiership
- J. J. Liston Trophy: Brett McTaggart (Williamstown – 19 votes Gary Sheldon (Coburg – 19 votes)
- Leading goalkicker: Jamie Shaw (Preston – 105 goals)

Division 2
- Teams: 6
- Premiers: Oakleigh; 2nd D2 premiership
- Minor premiers: Oakleigh; 4th D2 minor premiership
- J. Field Medal: Stephen Sells (Werribee – 23 votes
- Leading goalkicker: Rino Pretto (Oakleigh – 91 goals)

Attendance
- Matches played: 152 (D1: 94; D2: 58)
- Highest (finals): 22,034 (D1 Grand Final, Coburg vs Williamstown)

The 1988 VFA season was the 107th season of the top division of the Victorian Football Association (VFA), and the 28th and final season of second division competition.

The Division 1 premiership was won by the Coburg Football Club, after it defeated Williamstown in the Grand Final on 18 September by 27 points; it was Coburg's fifth Division 1 premiership. The final Division 2 premiership was won by Oakleigh; it was the club's second Division 2 premiership, and the last premiership ever won by the club in either division.

== Association membership ==
The Association contracted substantially in 1988. Between the end of 1987 and the end of 1988, a total of five teams left the Association:

- Northcote and Caulfield, who were suspended by the Association in November 1987
- Berwick, which withdrew from the Association in November 1987
- Waverley, which folded in March 1988
- Mordialloc, which withdrew from the Association in May 1988

Additionally, Moorabbin, which had been suspended in May 1987 for the remainder of that season, did not seek re-admission for 1988.

The controversial FORT review from December 1986 was considered instrumental in shaping the clubs' departures. The FORT review had recommended reducing the Association to 12 clubs in one division, with the second division operating as a suburban-level competition with no promotion or relegation between the levels; and, it explicitly named the eleven clubs it proposed to exclude from the rationalised competition. Even though the Association never received a mandate to enforce the FORT recommendations, all five of the clubs who departed saw the FORT review as partly responsible for their demise.

=== Caulfield ===
Caulfield, which had been relegated from Division 1 at the end of 1981, had struggled to remain competitive in Division 2. Its financial viability had been borderline throughout its time in Division 2, and the club occasionally struggled to field minor grade teams. The club was also not helped by a clubroom fire in 1985. Its situation deteriorated rapidly in 1987, when the club endured an exodus of 28 players, which it blamed on the uncertainty generated by its exclusion from the FORT blueprint, and from negative publicity generated when Association president Brook Andersen had compared the club to the struggling Geelong West – it ran at a loss of $60,000 during the year and considered itself lucky to have survived.

The club fell behind on its Association levies in July and August 1987, resulting in its suspension from the final match of the 1987 season. By November, the club still owed the Association $11,000 in levies and fines, and on 4 November, the Association executive suspended Caulfield for the 1988 season. The club did not dispute that it was behind on its levies, but believed that the Association suspended it, rather than showing lenience, because of its desire to achieve the FORT's vision of a rationalised competition. The club never returned to the Association, ending its 80-year affiliation which had begun in Brighton in 1908 before moving to Caulfield in 1962. The club merged with the Ashburton Football Club and played in the South East Suburban Football League in 1988.

=== Northcote ===
By November 1987, Northcote was found to no longer meet any of the Association's three minimum requirements for a club: it was not financially viable, as it lacked sponsors, had fewer than 100 members, and had no prospects of reversing this problem due to its small local population, and increased competition from soccer as the ethnic demographic in Northcote increased; it could no longer guarantee a home ground as the Northcote Council had been considering ending its tenancy of the Westgarth Street Oval; and it could not guarantee that it could muster enough players to field teams in all three grades. Officially, the club was suspended for the 1988 season on 4 November 1987, but Association president Brook Andersen commented that the club had "effectively resigned" by revealing all of these problems to the Association executive; although, there was some factional infighting within the club, and incoming club president Ian Galbraith, who wanted the club to stay in the Association, claimed that his factional enemies had exaggerated the magnitude of the club's problems in a deliberate attempt to bait the Association into expelling it. The club never returned, ending its 80-year affiliation with the Association, and soon disbanded.

=== Berwick ===
At its annual general meeting on 12 November 1987, Berwick discussed whether or not to withdraw from the Association and return to the South West Gippsland Football League. The club had not enjoyed any significant improvement in local support and its financial position had suffered since joining the Association from the SWGFL in 1983; and, there were concerns after the FORT review that Division 2 had an uncertain future. The motion to leave the Association was passed by a narrow majority at the meeting, and Berwick returned to the SWGFL in 1988, ending its five-year affiliation with the Association.

The club also noted that it was faced with paying a $5,000 instalment of its affiliation levy in November, with Caulfield's suspension sending a clear message that the club faced suspension if it failed to pay. Some at the club believed this to be a cynical ploy by the Association to drive its weaker clubs out of the competition, further raising concerns about whether it could survive long-term in the competition.

As of 2021, the club remains active, most recently in the Eastern Football League.

=== Waverley ===
In early March 1988, Waverley announced that it was in financial trouble. It had not paid its players for 1987, nor had it paid its most recent $5,000 instalment of the affiliation levy, it was $58,000 in debt and it needed to raise $20,000 within two weeks to remain in operation. The club's supporters and members rallied, and developed a plan to use its small cash reserves to pay the affiliation levy, then pledged its commitment to raise the $20,000 it needed, as well as the $80,000 it would need to operate for the rest of the season; but, within two days, one of the club's creditors objected to the club using its cash reserves in this manner, and threatened legal action. The club expected to be suspended if failed to pay its levies, but had no other way of raising the necessary cash, so it ceased operations and folded on 11 March, ending its 28-year affiliation with the Association.

=== Mordialloc ===
After Round 4, Mordialloc met to decide whether to stay in the Association or not. The club was performing very poorly on the field, having lost its three games by a combined 428 points – it struggled to recruit quality players, which it blamed on its proximity to the more successful Sandringham and Frankston and the uncertainty generated by the FORT review. Additionally, the immediate future of Division 2 was looking weaker than ever, as Brook Andersen had predicted to the media in late March that he expected the Association to have reduced to 14 teams in one division by 1989. The club was not in any immediate financial trouble, but it was concerned that a full year of continued uncompetitive performances in the uncertain Division 2 environment could cause financial trouble which would force the club to fold. As such, on 5 May, the club opted to withdraw immediately from the Association, ending an affiliation which had lasted just over thirty years. The following week, the club began playing in the South East Suburban Football League, where it believed it had greater long-term viability; and as of 2021, it is indeed still competing in the league's successor, the Southern Football League.

=== Administrative structure ===
In March, one of the FORT review's key recommendations was formally endorsed when the structure of the Association's Board of Management was changed; now, instead of being composed of delegates representing each of the clubs, a six-man independent board was elected at the beginning of the year. Under the new structure, which existed until 1993, the independent Board of Management had the power to make decisions on behalf of the Association; and, a separate Board of Directors, comprising one member from each club, was established and had the power to veto any Board of Management decision if it obtained a three-quarters majority in favour of doing so. The change brought an end to the club-based administrative model under which the Association had operated for 111 years since its establishment in 1877.

== Division 1 ==
The Division 1 home-and-away season was played over eighteen rounds; the top four then contested the finals under the Page–McIntyre system. The finals were played at the North Port Oval and the Grand Final was played at Windy Hill.

=== Ladder ===
1988 VFA Division 1 Ladder
Pos	Team	Pld	W	L	D	PF	PA	PP	Pts
1	Coburg (P)	18	13	5	0	2102	1549	135.7	52
2	Preston	18	12	6	0	2114	1777	119.0	48
3	Williamstown	18	11	7	0	1980	1607	123.2	44
4	Port Melbourne	18	10	8	0	2056	1818	113.1	40
5	Springvale	18	10	8	0	1550	1447	107.1	40
6	Brunswick	18	8	10	0	1578	1742	90.6	32
7	Box Hill	18	8	10	0	1616	2011	80.4	32
8	Frankston	18	7	11	0	1722	1909	90.2	28
9	Sandringham	18	6	12	0	1791	2075	86.3	24
10	Prahran	18	5	13	0	1350	1924	70.2	20

Rules for classification: 1) points; 2) percentage; 3) number of points for.
(P) Premiers

=== Finals ===
==== Semi-finals ====
	Semi-finals
Saturday, 27 August	Williamstown 24.15 (159)	def.	Port Melbourne 14.24 (108)	North Port Oval (crowd: 4,596)
Saturday, 3 September	Coburg 22.14 (146)	def.	Preston 7.11 (53)	North Port Oval (crowd: 4,626)

==== Preliminary final ====
	Preliminary final
Saturday, 10 September	Preston 11.9 (75)	def. by	Williamstown 18.17 (125)	North Port Oval (crowd: 4,865)

==== Grand Final ====
1988 VFA Division 1 Grand Final
Sunday, 18 September (2:10pm)	Coburg	def.	Williamstown	Windy Hill (crowd: 22,034)
6.3 (39); 7.9 (51); 14.15 (99); 16.18 (114)	Q1; Q2; Q3; Final	3.5 (23); 6.7 (43); 7.10 (52); 12.15 (87)	Umpires: J. Harvey, R. Walker; Norm Goss Memorial Medal: Tim Rieniets (Coburg)
Racovolis 3, Reynoldson 3, Rieniets 3, Weatherald 3, Allison, Angwin, Taranto, Williams	Goals	Rickman 3, Cahill 2, V. Dimartino, Kennedy, Kershaw, Nilsson, Raeburn, Round, Rowsell

=== Awards ===
- The leading goalkicker for the season was Jamie Shaw (Preston), who kicked 99 goals during the home-and-away season and 105 goals overall.
- The J. J. Liston Trophy was won jointly by Brett McTaggart (Williamstown) and Gary Sheldon (Coburg), who both polled 19 votes. Barry Round (Williamstown) finished third with 18 votes.
- Springvale won the seconds premiership. Springvale 12.15 (87) defeated Coburg 11.18 (84) in the Grand Final, held on Sunday 18 September.

== Division 2 ==
The Division 2 fixture was originally drawn up with eight teams over eighteen rounds, including both Waverley and Mordialloc. Following Waverley's departure, the fixture was unchanged except that Waverley's opponent was scheduled for a bye each week. After Mordialloc's departure, the Association expunged Mordialloc's three games from the record entirely; the rest of the season's fixture was re-drawn to ensure each team played a total of eighteen games.

The top four of the six remaining teams then contested the finals under the Page–McIntyre system. The semi-finals and preliminary final were played at the home ground of the higher-ranked team in the match; the Grand Final was played at Windy Hill.

=== Ladder ===
1988 VFA Division 2 Ladder
Pos	Team	Pld	W	L	D	PF	PA	PP	Pts
1	Oakleigh (P)	18	14	4	0	1855	1508	123.0	56
2	Werribee	18	10	8	0	1763	1631	108.1	40
3	Dandenong	18	8	9	1	1678	1608	104.4	34
4	Sunshine	18	8	10	0	1658	1785	92.9	32
5	Geelong West	18	7	10	1	1601	1731	92.5	30
6	Camberwell	18	6	12	0	1636	1928	84.9	24

Rules for classification: 1) points; 2) percentage; 3) number of points for.
(P) Premiers

=== Finals ===
	Semi-finals
Sunday, 28 August	Dandenong 11.13 (79)	def. by	Sunshine 15.10 (100)	Shepley Oval (crowd: 2,000)
Sunday, 4 September	Oakleigh 14.18 (102)	def.	Werribee 7.7 (49)	Warrawee Park (crowd: 2,272)

	Preliminary Final
Sunday, 11 September	Werribee 13.16 (94)	def. by	Sunshine 15.8 (98)	Chirnside Park (crowd: 2,000)

1988 VFA Division 2 Grand Final
Sunday, 18 September (11:10am)	Oakleigh	def.	Sunshine	Windy Hill (crowd: 22,034 (C-R))
4.4 (28); 11.5 (71); 18.14 (122); 22.17 (149)	Q1; Q2; Q3; Final	1.3 (9); 6.6 (42); 11.6 (72); 15.9 (99)	Umpires: Marshall, Morrow
Pretto 6, Verbeek 4, Owen 3, Roach 3, Marshall 2, Atherton, Cowled, Garbuio, Johnson	Goals	Shepparbottom 5, McQualter 3, Walsh 3, Nelson 2, Johnson, Litchfield
Hilliard, for striking Nelson in the second quarter	Reports

=== Awards ===
- The leading goalkicker for Division 2 for the fourth consecutive year was Rino Pretto (Oakleigh), who kicked 91 goals for the season.
- The J. Field Medal was won by Stephen Sells (Werribee), who polled 23 votes. Sells finished ahead of Peter Lindsay (Dandenong), who was second, and Michael Owen (Oakleigh), who was third.
- Werribee won the seconds premiership for the second consecutive season. Werribee 17.23 (125) defeated Camberwell 9.13 (67) in the Grand Final, played on Sunday 18 September.

== Notable events ==
=== Interleague matches ===
The Association competed in the second division of the 1988 Adelaide Bicentennial Carnival, held from 2 March to 5 March. The carnival was played under state of origin rules, so the Association was given permission to play up to five players from the VFL, SANFL or WAFL who began their senior careers in the Association, in addition to any currently-listed Association players regardless of their origin. It was the first time the Association had played representative games under origin rules. Barry Round (Williamstown) captained the Association team. The Association finished in second place after being defeated by Northern Territory in the Grand Final. Terry Wallace (Richmond, formerly of Camberwell) won the Dolphin Medal as the best player in Division 2 during the carnival, and he was the sole Association player selected in the All-Australian team.

1988 Adelaide Bicentennial Carnival

	Qualifying final
Thursday, 3 March (3:45pm)	V.F.A. 17.10 (112)	def.	Queensland 4.11 (35)	Football Park (crowd: 5,755 (C-R))

	Semi-final
Friday, 4 March (2:45pm)	V.F.A. 18.20 (128)	def.	A.C.T. 9.16 (70)	Norwood Oval

	Grand final
Saturday, 5 March (3:05pm)	Northern Territory 17.10 (112)	def.	V.F.A. 9.13 (67)	Football Park (crowd: 19,000 (C-R))

The Association then played two stand-alone interstate games, both under non-origin rules. The first was against Tasmania in Hobart. The second was against the West Australian Football League in Perth, and was played as a curtain-raiser to a state-of-origin match between Western Australia (which was composed of VFL and WAFL players of Western Australian origin) and Victoria.

	1988 non-carnival representative games
Saturday, 11 June	Tasmania 11.12 (78)	def.	V.F.A. 7.16 (58)	North Hobart Oval (crowd: 2,262)
Tuesday, 5 July (C-R)	W.A.F.L. 24.19 (163)	def.	V.F.A. 11.11 (77)	Subiaco Oval (crowd: 23,006 (C-R))

The VFA team also played a match against the Victorian Amateur Football Association on the evening of Wednesday 1 June at Skinner Reserve. This was not an official representative match, as both associations treated it as a practice match for their other representative fixtures. The VFA won the practice match by three goals.

=== Scheduling and television ===
After having televised Association finals matches in 1987, and having lost the rights to broadcast League football to the Seven Network during the off-season, the ABC substantially increased its Association coverage to broadcast the match of the round on a near-weekly basis throughout the 1988 season. It was the first time the Association had received weekly television coverage since 1981. As part of the arrangement, all of the televised matches were played on Saturdays instead of Sundays; and, the majority of the games were staged at North Port Oval, regardless of whether or not Port Melbourne was involved in the match – although some other grounds, including Preston City Oval, Coburg City Oval and Frankston Park were used occasionally. The central ground arrangement was not popular with all clubs: Sandringham complained after its 16 April match against Brunswick that it lost $8,000 in takings as a result of playing its home game in front of 500 spectators at Port Melbourne, when it could have attracted 5,000 at Beach Oval. This arrangement extended to the first three weeks of the Division 1 finals, which were all played on Saturdays at North Port Oval after many years of having been played on Sundays at Junction Oval.

The Division 1 Grand Final was also televised, but the deal with the ABC allowed the game to be played on Sunday, and did not require it to be played at Port Melbourne. The Association initially confirmed that Junction Oval would continue to serve as the Grand Final venue, but these plans were abandoned in July when the venue's ageing grandstands were declared a fire hazard by the MFB. Over the following six weeks, the Association negotiated with a number of councils to find a new Grand Final venue. Its first choice venue was Princes Park, and while it had the support of ground management, approval could not be gained from the Melbourne City Council to play on Sunday. Its second choice, Victoria Park, was likewise unable to gain approval for Sunday football from the Collingwood Council. The ground management at Western Oval, Footscray, was willing and able to host the entire finals series including a Sunday Grand Final, but the ABC television deal required the first three finals to be played at Port Melbourne, and Footscray was unwilling to host just the Grand Final. Eventually, on 19 August, the Association confirmed Windy Hill as the Grand Final venue, with the support of both the ground management and the Essendon Council for Sunday football.

The Division 2 Grand Final continued to be played as a curtain-raiser to the Division 1 Grand Final, but the other three Division 2 finals matches were played as stand-alone games on Sundays. Rather than secure a central venue, these matches were played at the home ground of the higher-placed team.

Other novel scheduling options were trialled to overcome the fact that the VFL was now playing nine Sunday home-and-away matches in Victoria during the season. This included:

- Geelong West utilised newly installed lights at the Western Oval, Geelong to play a Saturday night match against Sunshine on 16 July, then a Friday night game against Camberwell on 22 July. They were the Association's first night premiership matches since 1958. Geelong West had planned to play all of its remaining home games on Saturday nights, but none of its other opponents would agree to do so.
- A senior Association match was played as a curtain-raiser to a League senior match. Western suburban clubs Werribee and Sunshine played a match at the Western Oval, Footscray as a curtain-raiser to the League match between Footscray and Brisbane on Sunday 31 July; the curtain-raiser timeslot was usually filled by a VFL reserves game, but was available on this day because Brisbane did not field a reserves team.

=== Jamie Shaw state game controversy ===
In the lead-up to the Association's representative match against the WAFL on Tuesday 5 July, the Association announced that players in the representative team would be ineligible to play in their clubs' premiership matches on the weekend of 2–3 July. The board passed a resolution on 20 June stating that if a representative player played in that premiership game, he would be suspended for four weeks, and the club would be fined and stripped of any premiership points earned in the game; and, any players in the team who made themselves unavailable for selection would also be ineligible for their matches on 2–3 July, to guard against clubs intentionally making their star players unavailable to avoid losing them for the match.

In the lead-up to the game, two players who were considered likely selections declared themselves unavailable, and both were made ineligible for the games on 2–3 June: these players were Jim McAllester (Brunswick), who was unable to secure time off work, and Jamie Shaw (Preston), who was unable to travel as he was caring for his seriously ill mother. In an act of defiance, Preston fielded Shaw anyway; he kicked eight goals, and Preston defeated eventual minor premiers Coburg by 16 points; Preston 19.8 (122) d. Coburg 15.16 (106). The Association decided not to suspend Shaw himself, but awarded the game to Coburg and fined Preston $500.

Preston took the Association to court, seeking to have the original result of the game reinstated; and, in a decision handed down in the week before the finals, the courts found in Preston's favour and reinstated the win. Mr Justice Ormiston found that the Association's Board did not have the authority under its constitution to pass a resolution to impose bans on players for missing representative games; and, that because Shaw had lodged an affidavit declaring himself unavailable before Association selectors had formally selected the final team, the Association could not prove that Shaw would have been selected, and therefore could not demonstrate that the provisions within the 20 June resolution could be applied to him. Also considered was the double standard that Tony Pastore, who was not in the Association team but travelled to Perth as an emergency, had been allowed to play for Williamstown on the 2–3 July weekend. The finding was damaging to the credibility of the Association's new independent Board of Management.

As a result of the court's decision, Preston moved from third to second on the ladder, relegating Williamstown from second to third, and forcing the Seagulls to play in the first semi-final three days later.

=== Other notable events ===
- Three new rules were introduced into the Association shortly before the start of the season, one week after the same three rules were introduced in the VFL. These were:
  - The length of the 15-metre penalty for wasting an opponent's time after he takes a mark was increased to fifty metres.
  - Players were required to take a kick if awarded a free kick; if the player played on by handpass, the ball would be returned for a ball-up.
  - The full-back was required to kick the ball over a distance of at least two metres when kicking in after a behind.
- The financially struggling Geelong West Football Club, which was relegated at the end of 1987, was offered a $150,000 sponsorship over three years which was contingent upon it being returned to the top division. The Association would not re-promote the club to enable it to accept the sponsorship, forcing the club to turn it down.
- On 29 May, Preston led Box Hill by 55 points late in the third quarter; 17.9 (111) to 8.8 (56). From that point on Box Hill scored 13.3 to Preston 0.4 to win by 22 points; Box Hill 21.11 (137) d. Preston 17.13 (115).
- In the Division 2 first semi-final, Sunshine trailed Dandenong by 46 points at half-time, Sunshine 2.5 (17) vs Dandenong 9.9 (63); Sunshine then kicked 13 goals to two in the second half to win by 21 points.
- The rules relating to ties in Liston Trophy and Field Medal voting were amended this year to eliminate the countback between two players finishing equal on votes; in previous years, in the event of a tie, the player with more first preferences would be ranked higher. This had an immediate effect, as Brett McTaggart (Williamstown) and Gary Sheldon (Coburg) were joint winners of the Liston Trophy after tying on 19 votes; Sheldon would have won under previous countback rules, having polled five first preference votes to four.
- During 1988, the Geelong West Thirds team was composed largely of excess Box Hill Thirds players who could not command a regular place for the Mustangs; they were lent to Geelong West on the condition they be cleared back to Box Hill after the season. As a result, Geelong West's Thirds team was competitive for the first time in several years, after having been completely uncompetitive throughout the 1980s due to its inability to find Geelong-based juniors players willing and able to travel to away games in Melbourne.

== See also ==
- List of VFA/VFL premiers
