= Rugolo =

Rugolo may refer to:

- Rugolo (Sarmede), frazione of comune Sarmede, Veneto, Italy

== People ==
- Barb Rugolo, American poker player
- Joe Rugolo (born 1965), Australian rules footballer
- Michele Rugolo (born 1982), Italian racing driver
- Pete Rugolo (1915–2011), Sicilian-born jazz composer and arranger
- Frank Rugolo (born 1963), Australian rules footballer
