= Sean King (footballer) =

Australian rules footballer (1964–2025)

Personal information
- Full name: Sean Christopher King
- Born: 28 June 1964
- Died: 9 April 2025 (aged 60)
- Original team: West Perth
- Height: 181 cm (5 ft 11 in)
- Weight: 78 kg (172 lb)

Playing career
Years	Club	Games (Goals)
1986-1989	West Perth	60 (48)
1987	West Coast Eagles	1 (2)
1991	East Perth	10 (11)
Total		71 (61)

Sean Christopher King (28 June 1964 – 9 April 2025) was an Australian rules footballer who played for the West Coast Eagles in the Victorian Football League (VFL) and both the West Perth and East Perth Football Clubs in the West Australian Football League (WAFL).

King was an inaugural squad member of the West Coast Eagles but only made one appearance. It came in the final round of the season, against St Kilda at Subiaco, with King contributing two goals and 21 disposals to the win. Just like his West Perth teammate Paul Mifka who shared a debut with him that day, King was not picked again. At the Adelaide Bicentennial Carnival the following season, King represented the Australian Amateurs team.

King died from cancer on 9 April 2025, at the age of 60.

== Sources ==
- Holmesby, Russell and Main, Jim (2007). The Encyclopedia of AFL Footballers. 7th ed. Melbourne: Bas Publishing (softcover); ISBN 9781920910785.
