= Norm Goss Memorial Medal =

Australian rules football award

- League: Victorian Football League
- Awarded for: The best on ground in the VFA/VFL Grand Final

History
- First winner: Geoff Austen (1983)
- Most wins: Tim Rieniets (2)
- Most recent: Ollie Greeves (2026)

The Norm Goss Memorial Medal is an Australian rules football award presented annually to the player adjudged the best on ground in the grand final of the Victorian Football League (VFL). Prior to 1996, the competition was known as the Victorian Football Association (VFA). The award is named after Norm Goss Sr, who was heavily involved with the Port Melbourne Football Club as a player and administrator.

Tim Rieniets is the only player to have won the award twice, while two players have received the award as members of the losing teams. The club with the most Norm Goss Memorial Medal wins is Sandringham, with eight awards won by players representing the club. When the competition was split into two divisions before the 1989 season, it was only awarded for the Division 1 grand final.

The most recent recipient of the award is Box Hill's Ollie Greeves, who received ten votes for his performance in the 2026 VFL Grand Final against Geelong.

== Voting and presentation ==
As at 2022, the winner is voted on by a four-member panel consisting of former players, journalists and media personalities, with one member designated as the chair. Each panellist independently awards 3 votes, 2 votes and 1 vote to the players they regard as the best, second best and third best in the match respectively. These votes are tallied, and the highest number of combined votes wins the medal.

There is no chance of a tie for the medal; if two players are tied for votes, the following countbacks will apply in order:

- the player with the higher number of three-votes;
- the player with the higher number of two-votes;
- the player deemed best by the panel chair.

== Recipients ==
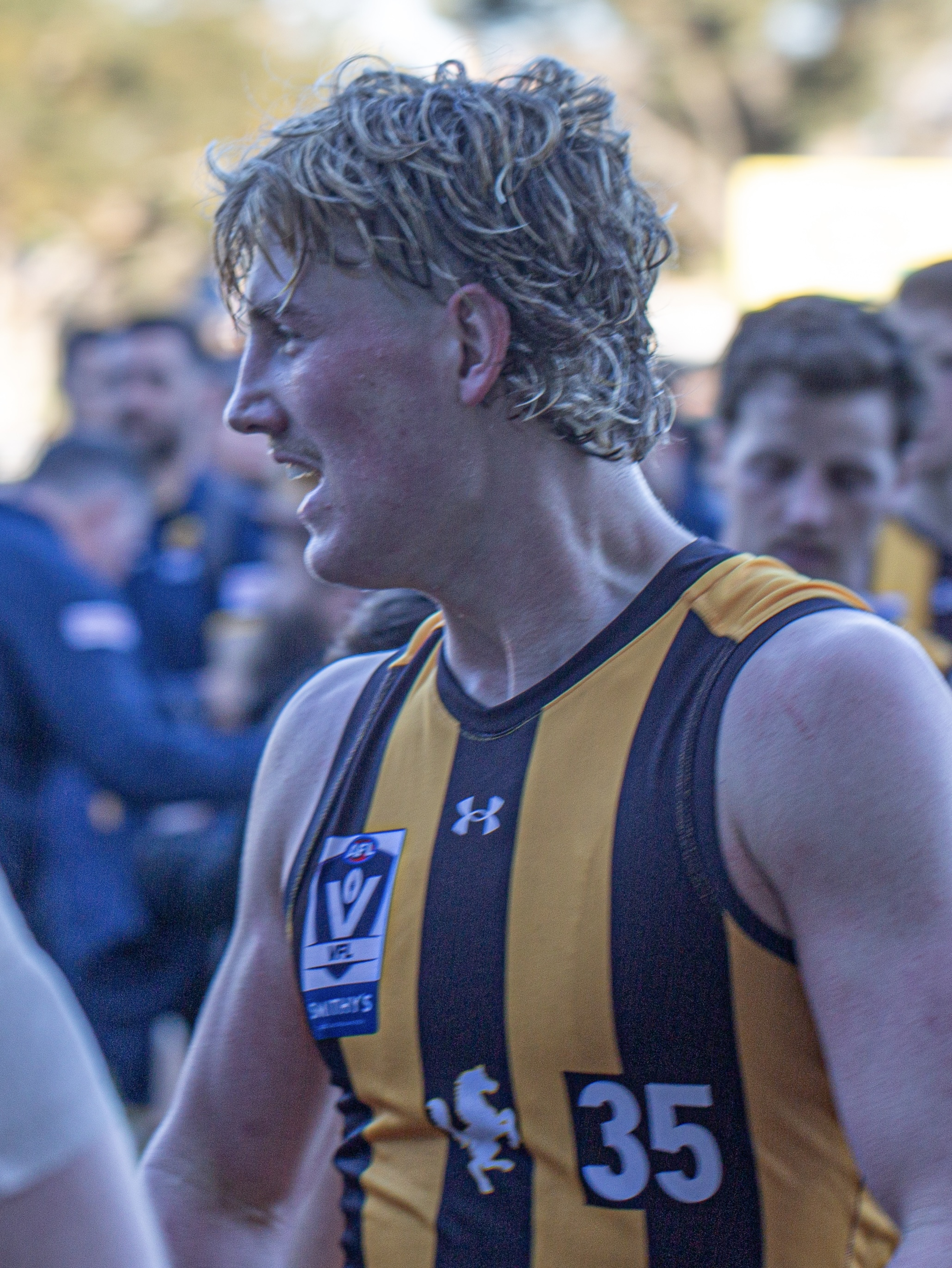
Box Hill's Ollie Greeves is the most recent Norm Goss Memorial Medallist

Werribee's Shaun Mannagh is one of two players to have won the award as the member of a losing team

Table key
^	Player was member of losing team

Table of recipients
Year	Recipient	Club	Ref
1983	Geoff Austen	Preston	
1984	Neil Jordan	Preston	
1985	Mark Eaves	Sandringham	
1986	Tony Pastore	Williamstown	
1987	Daryl Vernon	Springvale	
1988	Tim Rieniets	Coburg	
1989	Tim Rieniets	Coburg	
1990	Barry Round	Williamstown	
1991	Brad Gotch	Dandenong	
1992	Joe Rugolo	Sandringham	
1993	David Allday	Werribee	
1994	Anthony Allen	Sandringham	
1995	Martin Mellody	Springvale	
1996	Kain Taylor	Springvale	
1997	Tim Scott-Branagan	Sandringham	
1998	Ben Delarue	Springvale	
1999	Daniel Donati	Springvale	
2000	Richard Maloney	Sandringham	
2001	John Baird	Box Hill	
2002	James Rahilly	Geelong reserves	
2003	Adrian Fletcher	Williamstown	
2004	Guy Rigoni	Sandringham	
2005	Daniel Ward	Sandringham	
2006	Phillip Read	Sandringham	
2007	Tom Lonergan	Geelong reserves	
2008	Josh Smith	North Ballarat	
2009	Orren Stephenson	North Ballarat	
2010	Myles Sewell	North Ballarat	
2011	Toby Pinwill	Port Melbourne	
2012	George Horlin-Smith	Geelong reserves	
2013	Jonathan Simpkin	Box Hill	
2014	Brett Goodes	Footscray reserves	
2015	Michael Gibbons	Williamstown	
2016	Lin Jong	Footscray reserves	
2017	Sam Lloyd^	Richmond reserves	
2018	David Mirra	Box Hill	
2019	Marlion Pickett	Richmond reserves	
2020	Not awarded		
2021	Not awarded		
2022	Mitch White	Casey	
2023	Shaun Mannagh^	Werribee	
2024	Jack Henderson	Werribee	
2025	Cooper Craig-Peters	Footscray reserves	
2026	Ollie Greeves	Box Hill	
