= Malcolm Reed =

Australian rules footballer (born 1958)

Personal information
- Full name: Malcolm Reed
- Born: 11 February 1958 (age 68)
- Original team: Inverleigh
- Height: 180 cm (5 ft 11 in)
- Weight: 80 kg (176 lb)

Playing career^{1}
| Years | Club | Games (Goals) |
| 1978–1985 | Geelong | 81 (18) |
- ^{1} Playing statistics correct to the end of 1985.

Malcolm Reed (born 11 February 1958) is a former Australian rules footballer who played with Geelong in the Victorian Football League (VFL).

Reed, recruited locally, made his VFL debut in 1978 but wasn't a regular member of the side until 1982. In between he enjoyed team success in the reserves, with premierships in 1980 and 1981, the former as club captain. He tied for the 1981 Gardiner Medal and although the award was awarded initially to Daryl Vernon on count back, he was declared joint winner the week after when the league changed the rules.

On the back of his reserves efforts, Reed was given an extended run in the seniors during the 1982 VFL season, playing the opening 11 rounds. He then played 18 games in 1983 and averaged 15 disposals. Over the next two seasons he added a further 29 games. A utility, Reed played most often as a back pocket.
