= Ollie Greeves =

Australian rules footballer (born 2007)

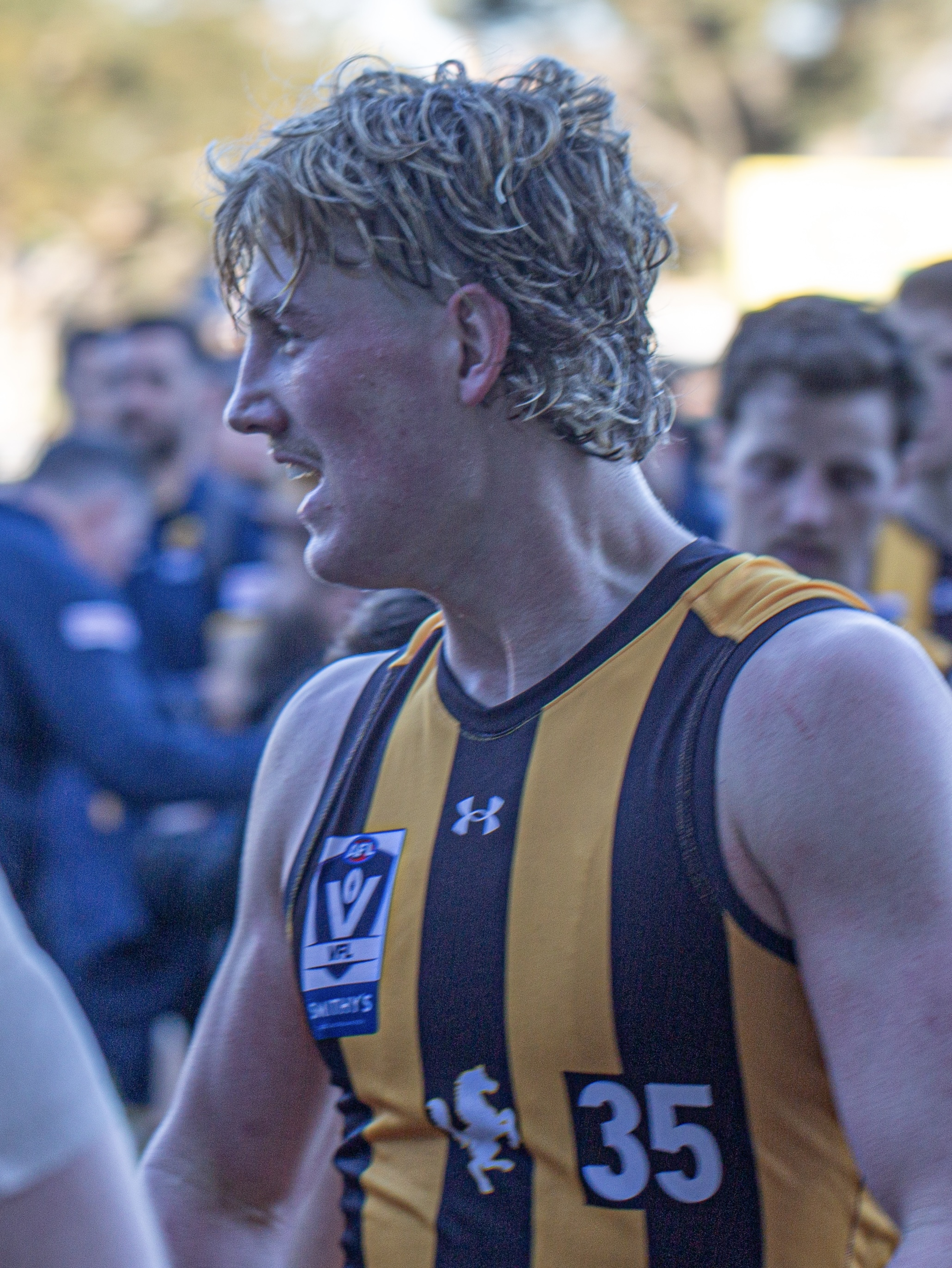
- Greeves playing for Box Hill in 2026

Personal information
- Full name: Oliver Greeves
- Born: 7 February 2007 (age 19)
- Original team: Eastern Ranges (Talent League)
- Draft: No. 12, 2026 rookie draft
- Debut: Round 18, 2026, Hawthorn vs. Carlton, at the Melbourne Cricket Ground
- Height: 191 cm (6 ft 3 in)

Club information
- Current club: Hawthorn
- Number: 35

Playing career^{1}
Years	Club	Games (Goals)
2026–	Hawthorn	4 (1)
- ^{1} Playing statistics correct to the end of 2026.

Career highlights
- VFL premiership player: 2026; Norm Goss Memorial Medal: 2026

Oliver Greeves (born 7 February 2007) is a professional Australian rules footballer playing for the Hawthorn Football Club in the Australian Football League (AFL).

== Junior career ==
Greeves played junior football for Lysterfield and Vermont in the Eastern Football Netball League.

Greeves played in the Talent League for the Eastern Ranges. In his draft year in 2025, he averaged 26.2 disposals and 1.1 goals per game. In 2025, Greeves also played for Vic Metro in the Under 18 Championships, where was awarded the Vic Metro MVP and came runner-up for the Larke Medal.

Greeves also played high-level basketball before being drafted, playing for the Knox Raiders Under 18s and representing Victoria Metro in 2024 at the National Championships.

== AFL career ==
Prior to being drafted, Hawthorn attempted to add Greeves to their Next Generation Academy under his Indigenous background. Their bid was rejected by the AFL. Despite this, Hawthorn were still able to land Greeves with pick 12 of the 2026 rookie draft. He was selected to make his debut in round 18 of the 2026 AFL season.

In Box Hill's victorious 2026 VFL Grand Final, Greeves was awarded the Norm Goss Memorial Medal after having 28 disposals and 9 clearances.

== Personal life ==
Greeves attended school at Caulfield Grammar. He is the great-great-nephew of former Geelong player Carji Greeves.

== Statistics ==
Updated to the end of 2026.

Legend
G	Goals	K	Kicks	D	Disposals	T	Tackles
B	Behinds	H	Handballs	M	Marks

Season	Team	No.	Games	Totals							Averages (per game)							Votes
Season	Team	No.	Games	G	B	K	H	D	M	T	G	B	K	H	D	M	T	Votes
2026	Hawthorn	35	4	1	1	22	27	49	19	6	0.3	0.3	5.5	6.8	12.3	4.8	1.5	0
Career			4	1	1	22	27	49	19	6	0.3	0.3	5.5	6.8	12.3	4.8	1.5	0

== Honours and achievements ==
Team

- VFL premiership player (Box Hill): 2026

Individual

- Norm Goss Memorial Medal: 2026
