= Mark Summers (footballer) =

Australian rules footballer

Personal information
- Full name: Mark Summers
- Born: 4 August 1966 (age 60)
- Original team: Old Xaverians
- Height: 193 cm (6 ft 4 in)
- Weight: 89 kg (196 lb)
- Position: Ruckman

Playing career^{1}
| Years | Club | Games (Goals) |
| 1988–89 | Richmond | 15 (4) |
- ^{1} Playing statistics correct to the end of 1989.

Mark Summers (born 4 August 1966) is a former Australian rules footballer who played for Richmond in the Victorian Football League (VFL) during the late 1980s.

Summers played his early football at Old Xaverians with a strong presence before joining Richmond. He was used mostly as a ruckman and centre half forward in the VFL and after just three appearances in 1988 was a regular for the second half of the 1989 season. He only twice played in a winning team at Richmond after being struck down with a knee injury in game, forcing Summers to retire.

He competed in the 1988 Adelaide Bicentennial Carnival with the Australian Amateurs side.

Summers is now a musculoskeletal physiotherapist and has three children, Madeleine, Claudia and Harrison.
