= Allen Eade =

Australian rules footballer

Personal information
- Full name: Allen Eade
- Born: 11 September 1960 (age 66)
- Original team: Coburg
- Height: 189 cm (6 ft 2 in)
- Weight: 82 kg (181 lb)

Playing career^{1}
Years	Club	Games (Goals)
1984–85	Collingwood	8 (1)
- ^{1} Playing statistics correct to the end of 1985.

Allen Eade (born 11 September 1960) is a former Australian rules footballer who played for Collingwood in the Victorian Football League (VFL) during the 1980s.

Eade spent most of his career at Coburg but played with Collingwood in a two-season stint. He then returned to the Victorian Football Association and was a half back flanker in Coburg's 1988 premiership team and on the half forward flank when they claimed a second successive flag the following season. Eade represented the VFA in the 1988 Adelaide Bicentennial Carnival. He is one of three emergencies in the official Coburg 'Team of the Century'.
