= David Murphy (Australian rules footballer) =

Australian rules footballer

Personal information
- Born: 23 August 1962 (age 64); Wagga Wagga, New South Wales
- Original teams: Finley, Turvey Park (Riverina Football League)
- Height: 179 cm (5 ft 10 in)
- Weight: 75 kg (165 lb)
- Position: Wing

Playing career^{1}
Years	Club	Games (Goals)
1984–1993	Sydney	156 (92)
- ^{1} Playing statistics correct to the end of 1993.

Career highlights
- All-Australian 1988; Victorian representative; Sydney Team of the Century: Wing

David Murphy (born 23 August 1962) is a former Australian rules footballer who played with the Sydney Swans in the Victorian/Australian Football League (VFL/AFL).

Murphy, a pacy wingman, partnered Greg Williams in the Swans' midfield during the late 1980s. He represented Victoria and New South Wales in State of Origin and earned All-Australian selection for his performance in the 1988 Bicentennial Carnival in Adelaide.

When questioned about this for Inside Football, Murphy stated, "But it's true about me never living in Victoria. I wore the Big V, but never once lived anywhere but in New South Wales."

Murphy's early youth was spent in Finley, but he moved to the Wagga Wagga suburb of Turvey Park, thereby allowing the Swans to recruit him.

In 2003 Murphy was selected on the wing in the Swans' official 'Team of the Century'.
