= Peter Curtain =

Australian rules footballer

Personal information
- Full name: Peter Curtain
- Born: 5 December 1962 (age 63)
- Original team: Old Xaverians
- Height: 185 cm (6 ft 1 in)
- Weight: 76 kg (168 lb)

Playing career^{1}
Years	Club	Games (Goals)
1984–85	St Kilda	2 (0)
- ^{1} Playing statistics correct to the end of 1985.

Peter Curtain (born 5 December 1962) is a former Australian rules footballer who played for St Kilda in the Victorian Football League (VFL) during the 1980s.

A premiership player at Old Xaverians in 1981, Curtain could only manage two appearances with St Kilda's seniors. He returned to Old Xavs after his VFL stint ended and won their 'Best and Fairest' in 1986, his first year as captain. Curtain remained captain until the end of the 1988 season and in the same year represented the Australian Amateurs team at the Adelaide Bicentennial Carnival.
