= Grant O'Riley =

Australian rules footballer

Personal information
- Full name: Grant O'Riley
- Born: 21 January 1960 (age 66)
- Original team: Port Melbourne
- Height: 193 cm (6 ft 4 in)
- Weight: 92 kg (203 lb)

Playing career^{1}
Years	Club	Games (Goals)
1982–83	Fitzroy	6 (5)
- ^{1} Playing statistics correct to the end of 1983.

Grant O'Riley (born 21 January 1960) is a former Australian rules footballer who played for Fitzroy in the Victorian Football League (VFL) during the 1980s.

After making his league debut late in the 1982 season, against Collingwood at Waverley Park, O'Riley made two further appearances that year. Under the coaching of Robert Walls, Fitzroy made the finals in 1983, having narrowly missed out the previous season, but O'Riley did not to feature despite participating in three wins earlier in their campaign.

O'Riley later played at Port Melbourne and represented the VFA representative team in the 1988 Adelaide Bicentennial Carnival.
