= Simon Clark (Australian footballer) =

Australian rules footballer

Personal information
- Full name: Simon Clark
- Born: 16 February 1967 (age 59)
- Original team: Notting Hill
- Height: 195 cm (6 ft 5 in)
- Weight: 85 kg (187 lb)
- Position: Ruckman

Playing career^{1}
Years	Club	Games (Goals)
1986–1988	Richmond	27 (6)
- ^{1} Playing statistics correct to the end of 1988.

Simon Clark (born 16 February 1967) is a former Australian rules footballer who played with Richmond in the Victorian Football League (VFL).

== Career ==
Clark was a ruckman, recruited to Richmond from Notting Hill. He made 27 league appearances for Richmond, 12 in 1986, 11 in 1987 and four in 1988.

Following his career at Richmond, Clark played for Springvale in the Victorian Football Association, later the Victorian Football League. He made an immediate impression at Springvale in 1989, with a best and fairest and fourth placing in the J. J. Liston Trophy. In the 1992 VFA season he finished equal second behind Joe Rugolo in the Liston Trophy, then in 1993 was equal third. He was a member of Springvale's 1995 premiership team, in the final season of VFA football and would be involved in three further premierships. By the time he retired, his 203 games for Springvale was a club record.

== Honours ==
The Casey Scorpions, as Springvale are now known, named their best and fairest award the Gardner Clark Medal, after Clark and 1960s player Ian Gardner.
