= David Allday =

Australian rules footballer

Personal information
- Full name: David Allday
- Born: 27 November 1964 (age 61)
- Original team: Bentleigh-McKinnon
- Height: 198 cm (6 ft 6 in)
- Weight: 85 kg (187 lb)

Playing career^{1}
| Years | Club | Games (Goals) |
| 1985–1986 | Melbourne | 15 (4) |
| 1988 | Footscray | 6 (1) |
| Total | | 21 (5) |
- ^{1} Playing statistics correct to the end of 1988.

David Allday (b. 27 November 1964) is a former Australian rules footballer who played with Melbourne and Footscray in the Victorian Football League (VFL) during the 1980s.

Allday, a ruckman from Bentleigh-McKinnon, made four appearances for Melbourne in 1985 and 11 in 1986, polling Brownlow Medal votes in three of them, including best on ground honours against Fitzroy at Waverley.

Allday spent the 1988 VFL season at Footscray, where he was a second ruckman to Richard Cousins but was only required for six games.

Allday moved to Victorian Football Association (VFA) club Werribee in 1989, winning the club "Best and Fairest" in 1990. Werribee won the 1991 minor premiership and the 1993 premiership, with Allday winning the Norm Goss Memorial Medal in the 1993 grand final winning side.
