= Mark Eaves =

Australian rules footballer

Personal information
- Full name: Mark Eaves
- Born: 3 April 1961 (age 65)
- Original team: Doncaster (EFL)
- Height: 192 cm (6 ft 4 in)
- Weight: 94 kg (207 lb)

Playing career^{1}
| Years | Club | Games (Goals) |
| 1982–1983 | Fitzroy | 2 (0) |
| 1984 | North Adelaide | 5 (9) |
- ^{1} Playing statistics correct to the end of 1984.

Mark Eaves (born 3 April 1961) is a former Australian rules footballer who played with Fitzroy in the Victorian Football League (VFL).

Eaves, who was recruited from Doncaster Football Club and played in the Fitzroy Under-19s, made just two league appearances for Fitzroy. A defender, he played in a game against Richmond in 1982 and took part in Fitzroy's 86-point win over Melbourne at Junction Oval in 1983.

Following his delisting by Fitzroy, Eaves moved to the South Australian National Football League (SANFL) in 1984 to play for North Adelaide before returning to Melbourne to play with Victorian Football Association (VFA) club Sandringham. At his new club he was used as a forward and kicked five goals in Sandringham's 1985 VFA Grand Final triumph, to win the Norm Goss Memorial Medal.

Eaves returned to the VFL in 1986 when he was recruited by Footscray. Eaves led the VFL Reserves Goalkicking with 42 goals after Round 9 before returning to Sandringham.
