= Rob Prosser =

Australian rules footballer

Personal information
- Nickname: Robert Prosser
- Born: 8 July 1964 (age 62)
- Height: 174 cm (5 ft 9 in)
- Weight: 64 kg (141 lb)
- Position: Midfielder

Playing career^{1}
Years	Club	Games (Goals)
1985	Sydney	2 (1)
- ^{1} Playing statistics correct to the end of 1985.

Rob Prosser (born 8 July 1964) is a former Australian rules football player, who played two games for the Sydney Swans in 1985.

In 1987, he was recruited by VFA club Springvale, and was a member of its 1987 premiership team.
