= Jim McAllester =

Australian rules footballer

Personal information
- Full name: Jim C. McAllester
- Born: 16 April 1959 (age 67)
- Original team: Moonee Imperials
- Height: 190 cm (6 ft 3 in)
- Weight: 85 kg (187 lb)
- Position: Utility

Playing career^{1}
Years	Club	Games (Goals)
1980	Essendon	2 (0)
1981–1982	Footscray	24 (4)
1984	Collingwood	10 (18)
Total		36 (22)
- ^{1} Playing statistics correct to the end of 1984.

Jim McAllester (born 16 April 1959) is a former Australian rules footballer who played with Essendon, Footscray and Collingwood in the Victorian Football League (VFL).

McAllester could play as a ruckman but was mostly used as either a forward and defender during his career.

After serving an apprenticeship in the under-19s, McAllester made two senior appearances for Essendon in 1980 but did not register a possession in either game.

He spent the 1981 and 1982 seasons at Footscray before playing at East Ballarat in 1983.

McAllester played with Collingwood in 1984 and 1985, but was restricted to the reserves in the latter season. Upon leaving Collingwood, he joined the Brunswick Football Club.
