= Paul Mifka =

Australian rules footballer

Personal information
- Full name: Paul Mifka
- Born: 8 June 1965 (age 61)
- Original team: Balcatta
- Height: 186 cm (6 ft 1 in)
- Weight: 81 kg (179 lb)
- Position: Defender

Playing career
Years	Club	Games (Goals)
1984–1999	West Perth	283 (136)
1987	West Coast	1 (0)
Total		284 (136)

Representative team honours
Years	Team	Games (Goals)
1988–1994	Western Australia	4 (1)

Career highlights
- WAFL Premiership Player - 1995, 1999; West Perth best and fairest 1993

Paul Mifka (born 8 June 1965) is a former Australian rules footballer who played for West Perth in the West Australian Football League (WAFL) and the West Coast Eagles in the Australian Football League (AFL).

== Playing career ==
Mifka made his WAFL league debut for West Perth in 1984. Mifka was used initially as a wingman at West Perth but developed into a defender. He joined West Coast in 1987 for their inaugural season but had to wait until the last home and away match to make his debut. The former Balcatta player gathered 14 disposals in a convincing win over St Kilda at Subiaco Oval and it would be his only appearance in the seniors. He was picked up by the Brisbane Bears in 1990 AFL draft but it wasn't successful and he ended up back at West Perth.

A dual WAFL premiership player, in 1995 and 1999, Mifka won West Perth's Breckler Medal in 1993. He was also a four-time interstate representative and played State of Origin football in the 1988 Adelaide Bicentennial Carnival.

== Sources ==
- Holmesby, Russell and Main, Jim (2007). The Encyclopedia of AFL Footballers. 7th ed. Melbourne: Bas Publishing (softcover); ISBN 9781920910785
