= Ron James (footballer, born 1970) =

Australian rules footballer

Personal information
- Full name: Ron James
- Born: 5 November 1970
- Died: 1 January 1990 (aged 19); Echuca, Victoria
- Original team: Williamstown
- Height: 178 cm (5 ft 10 in)
- Weight: 75 kg (165 lb)
- Position: Rover

Playing career^{1}
Years	Club	Games (Goals)
1987–89	Footscray	16 (6)
- ^{1} Playing statistics correct to the end of 1989.

Ron James (5 November 1970 – 1 January 1990) was an Australian rules footballer who played with Footscray in the Victorian Football League (VFL) during the late 1980s.

== History ==
James started his senior career at the age of just 14, when Williamstown coach Terry Wheeler picked him for the 1985 VFA Grand Final, despite having spent the entire season in the Under-19s. The club lost the match by six points but James was a member of their 1986 premiership team.

Affectionately known as Ronnie, he joined Footscray in 1987 but struggled to establish a place for himself in the team, managing only 16 games in three seasons. He kicked a goal on debut in a loss to Carlton but was overall inaccurate during his VFL career, with 16 behinds to go with his six goals. A rover, James received his only Brownlow Medal vote for his 17 disposals in a win over the Brisbane Bears at Western Oval in 1988.

At the age of 19, James was killed in a water skiing accident near Echuca on New Year's Day 1990. He had been skiing with two friends on the Murray River, and was flung into a tree. He died on his way to Echuca Hospital. Wheeler, his former coach at Williamstown, had joined Footscray for the 1990 AFL season and was later quoted as saying James could have been a 150 or 200 game player.
