= Ian Morrison (footballer) =

Australian rules footballer

Personal information
- Full name: Ian Morrison
- Born: 29 January 1954 (age 72)
- Original team: St Pat's College
- Height: 188 cm (6 ft 2 in)
- Weight: 85 kg (187 lb)
- Position: Half forward/ruck-rover

Playing career^{1}
Years	Club	Games (Goals)
1973–80	Footscray	110 (101)
1981	Essendon	3 (0)
Total		113 (101)
- ^{1} Playing statistics correct to the end of 1981.

Ian Morrison (born 29 January 1954) is a former Australian rules footballer who played for Footscray and Essendon in the Victorian Football League (VFL).

Footscray recruited Morrison from St Pat's College and he became a useful player for the club, as a ruck-rover and half forward flanker. He spent his final VFL season at Essendon.

Morrison later played with Sandringham and where he had success as a full-forward, kicking 108 goals in their premiership year of 1985 to win what is now called the Jim 'Frosty' Miller Medal.
