= John Favier =

Australian rules footballer

Personal information
- Full name: John Favier
- Born: 23 July 1960 (age 66)
- Original team: Black Rock
- Height: 185 cm (6 ft 1 in)
- Weight: 90 kg (198 lb)

Playing career^{1}
Years	Club	Games (Goals)
1982–1984	St Kilda	26 (1)
1985	Sydney Swans	2 (0)
Total		28 (1)
- ^{1} Playing statistics correct to the end of 1985.

John Favier (born 23 July 1960) is a former Australian rules footballer who played with St Kilda and the Sydney Swans in the Victorian Football League (VFL).

Favier was a half-back, recruited to St Kilda from Black Rock.

He made 26 appearances for St Kilda, from 1982 to 1984, then in 1985 moved to Sydney, where he played two further league games.

In 1986 he joined Frankston in the Victorian Football Association (VFA) and the following year had a fourth-place finish in the J. J. Liston Trophy.

He represented the VFA in interstate football.
