= Daryl Vernon =

Australian rules footballer (born 1960)

Personal information
- Full name: Daryl Vernon
- Born: 9 June 1960 (age 66)
- Original team: Essex Heights
- Height: 175 cm (5 ft 9 in)
- Weight: 76 kg (168 lb)

Playing career^{1}
| Years | Club | Games (Goals) |
| 1981, 1985 | Richmond | 9 (3) |
| 1983–1984 | Sydney Swans | 8 (2) |
| Total | | 17 (5) |
- ^{1} Playing statistics correct to the end of 1985.

Daryl Vernon (born 9 June 1960) is a former Australian rules footballer who played with Richmond and the Sydney Swans in the Victorian Football League (VFL) during the 1980s.

A rover from Essex Heights, Vernon made four senior appearances for Richmond in the 1981 VFL season. He performed well in the reserves that year and shared the Gardiner Medal with Geelong's Malcolm Reed.

He spent 1982 in Western Australia, where he played for Western Australian Football League (WAFL) club South Fremantle.

Vernon returned to the VFL in 1983 and signed with the Sydney Swans, who had relocated from South Melbourne the previous year. He played in the opening four rounds of the season and averaged 18 disposals, but didn't feature again until he played another four games early in the 1984 VFL season.

He was back at Richmond in 1985 and in his third game of the season, against Melbourne at the MCG, Vernon starred with 30 disposals, an effort which earned him three Brownlow Medal votes. Picked just twice more that year, Vernon left Richmond and captained Springvale in the 1986 Victorian Football Association season. He was a member of their premiership winning team in 1987 and won the Norm Goss Memorial Medal for his grand final performance against Port Melbourne, before retiring at the end of 1988.
