= Mark Whitzell =

Australian rules footballer

Personal information
- Full name: Mark Whitzell
- Born: 18 January 1964 (age 62)
- Original team: Altona North / Brooklyn YC
- Height: 188 cm (6 ft 2 in)
- Weight: 87 kg (192 lb)

Playing career^{1}
Years	Club	Games (Goals)
1981–1986	Sydney Swans	12 (0)
- ^{1} Playing statistics correct to the end of 1986.

Mark Whitzell (born 18 January 1964) is a former Australian rules footballer who played with the Sydney Swans in the Victorian Football League (VFL).

== Career ==
Whitzell, who came from Altona North and Brooklyn YC, was a Victorian Teal Cup representative in 1981. Described by teammate Dermott Brereton as having "more tattoos than Angry Anderson", Whitzell made his league debut for South Melbourne a few weeks later, as a 17-year-old. That appearance, against Fitzroy at Lake Oval, would remain his only senior game until 1983, by which time the club had relocated to Sydney. He played four league games in 1983 and continued to make only occasional senior appearances for Sydney over the next three years. In 1987 he played for Port Melbourne in the Victorian Football Association and polled the equal second most votes (17) at the J. J. Liston Trophy.
