= Terry Wheeler =

Australian rules footballer and coach

Personal information
- Born: 13 March 1955 (age 71)
- Original team: Warburton
- Height: 178 cm (5 ft 10 in)
- Weight: 89 kg (196 lb)

Playing career^{1}
Years	Club	Games (Goals)
1974–1983	Footscray	157 (18)

Coaching career
Years	Club	Games (W–L–D)
1990–1994	Footscray	91 (50–40–1)
- ^{1} Playing statistics correct to the end of 1983.

Terry Wheeler (born 13 March 1955) is a former Australian rules footballer who played for and coached Footscray in the Australian Football League.

Wheeler played as a defender during his 157-game career for Footscray from 1974 to 1983.

The following season he joined VFA club Williamstown as captain-coach. In five seasons with Williamstown, Wheeler played 94 games, and he led the club to a premiership in 1986 and to Grand Finals in 1985 and 1988. His presence, coupled with that of enthusiastic president Tony Hannebery, was considered critical to attracting big-name players like Barry Round and Tony Pastore to Williamstown, and to the revival of the club during the 1980s after an indifferent decade during the 1970s.

He was appointed to the position of assistant coach under senior coach Mick Malthouse at Footscray in 1989. Malthouse left shortly after the season, and shortly before merger between Footscray and Fitzroy to form the Fitzroy Bulldogs was announced. Footscray supporters began to fight the merger in court, and on 8 October, Wheeler was appointed senior coach of Footscray for 1990, when he replaced Malthouse, even though it was not certain there would be a team for him to coach. He was active in the campaign against the merger, which was ultimately defeated on 23 October when the supporters raised enough money and sponsorship to make the club viable.

With twelve wins in the 1990 season, he took Footscray close to a finals spot in his first year at the helm, where they finished in seventh place, just missing out of the finals. In the 1991 season Footscray's performance under Wheeler dropped when they finished tenth on the ladder with nine wins and twelve losses. In the 1992 season, Wheeler took Footscray to finish second on the ladder after the home-and-away season. They however failed to make the premiership decider after losing in the preliminary final to Geelong, but Wheeler was named as coach of the All-Australian Team. Wheeler was sacked after just two rounds of the 1994 season following an 88-point loss to Geelong. Wheeler was then replaced by Alan Joyce as Footscray Football Club senior coach.
