= Moorabbin Football Club (1979–1987) =

Names
- Full name: Moorabbin Football Club
- Nickname(s): Kangas

Club details
- Founded: 1979; 46 years ago
- Dissolved: 1987; 38 years ago
- Competition: Victorian Football Association
- Ground(s): Bentleigh Recreation Reserve (1985−87); McKinnon Reserve (1984); Moorabbin Oval (until 1984)

The Moorabbin Football Club, nicknamed the Kangas, was an Australian rules football club best known for its time in the Victorian Football Association (VFA) from 1983 to 1987. The club existed for only eight years and did not achieve any success.

== History ==
The Moorabbin Football Club was formed in 1979 via a merger of the neighbouring McKinnon Football Club and Bentleigh Football Club, each of whom played in the Federal Football League (FFL). The new amalgamated club was based at McKinnon but known as Moorabbin, taking the same colours and nickname as the former Moorabbin Football Club, which disbanded in 1965. The merged club competed in the FFL until 1981, after which the league folded, and then played in the South East Suburban Football League in 1982. The club was then admitted to the expanded VFA second division in 1983.

In 1983, the club played its games at Moorabbin Oval, sharing it with St Kilda, and trained at McKinnon Reserve, but began playing its games in McKinnon in 1984 due to the high cost to rent Moorabbin Oval, then moved to the Bentleigh Recreation Reserve from 1985. The club competed for just over four years in Division 2, its best performance coming in 1985 when it recruited champion goalkicker Fred Cook and missed the finals on percentage.

After playing the first two matches of the 1987 season, the club forfeited two successive games after coach Graham Stewart resigned over a dispute with the board, and a large group of players walked out in support; the club was suspended by the VFA for its inability to field a team in all three grades, and then went into recess and ultimately folded.
