= Frank Rugolo =

Australian rules footballer

Personal information
- Full name: Francesco Rugolo
- Born: 5 September 1963 (age 63)
- Original team: St Peters East Bentleigh. Assumption College
- Height: 184 cm (6 ft 0 in)
- Weight: 80 kg (176 lb)

Playing career^{1}
Years	Club	Games (Goals)
1983–86	Melbourne	11 (11)
- ^{1} Playing statistics correct to the end of 1986.

Francesco "Frank" Rugolo (born 5 September 1963) is a former Australian rules footballer who played with Melbourne in the Victorian Football League (VFL).

He later played in the Victorian Football Association for Sandringham. He was the leading goalkicker of the 1991 home-and-away season with 78 goals, before finishing second overall after the finals.

Rugolo's brother Joe also played for Melbourne during the 1980s.
