= Tim Rieniets =

Australian rules footballer

Personal information
- Full name: Tim Rieniets
- Born: 14 April 1966 (age 60)
- Original teams: Wangaratta Rovers, Coburg
- Draft: 27th, 1990 Pre-Season Draft
- Height: 183 cm (6 ft 0 in)
- Weight: 79 kg (174 lb)

Playing career^{1}
Years	Club	Games (Goals)
1990–1991	Carlton	24 (6)
- ^{1} Playing statistics correct to the end of 1991.

Tim Rieniets (born 14 April 1966) is a former Australian rules footballer who played with Carlton in the Australian Football League (AFL).

Rieniets, a Wangaratta Rovers junior, was recruited by North Melbourne and in two years with the club he only played Under-19s and reserves football.

He participated in Coburg's back to back premierships in 1988 and 1989, becoming the only person to win dual Norm Goss Memorial Medals.

Carlton picked Rieniets up in the 1990 Pre-Season Draft and he kicked a goal with his first kick in senior AFL football, against North Melbourne at Princes Park. Used mostly as a ruck-rover or defender, Rieniets made 12 appearances in 1990. He played another 12 games in 1991 and averaged 18 disposals but lost his place in the team towards the end of the year.

Later in the 1990s he returned to the VFA, and was a member of Werribee's 1993 premiership side and then in Sandringham's 1997 grand final win. In doing so, he achieved the very rare feat of winning VFA/VFL premierships with three clubs.
