= Joe Rugolo =

Australian rules footballer

Personal information
- Full name: Joseph Rugolo
- Born: 2 September 1965 (age 61)
- Original team: St Peters East Bentleigh. Assumption College
- Height: 193 cm (6 ft 4 in)
- Weight: 86 kg (190 lb)
- Position: Ruckman

Playing career^{1}
Years	Club	Games (Goals)
1985–87	Melbourne	8 (0)
1988–94	Sandringham	102 (56)
- ^{1} Playing statistics correct to the end of 1994.

Joe Rugolo (born 2 September 1965) is a former Australian rules footballer who played for Melbourne in the Victorian Football League (VFL) during the 1980s.

Rugolo was an Assumption College recruit and spent three seasons with Melbourne. His brother Frank was on the Melbourne list at the same time but they never played a game together.

A ruckman, Rugolo played with Sandringham after leaving Melbourne. In 1992, a premiership year, he won a J. J. Liston Trophy, having narrowly missed out on it the previous two seasons. Rugolo finished the year with a Norm Goss Memorial Medal winning performance in the Grand Final win.
