= Tony Pastore =

Australian rules footballer

Personal information
- Full name: Anthony Pastore
- Born: 16 April 1966 (age 60)
- Height: 184 cm (6 ft 0 in)
- Weight: 90 kg (198 lb)

Playing career^{1}
| Years | Club | Games (Goals) |
| 1985–1997 | Williamstown | 189 (150) |
| 1987 | Richmond | 1 (0) |
- ^{1} Playing statistics correct to the end of 1997.

Tony Pastore (born 16 April 1966) is a former Australian rules footballer who played with Richmond in the Victorian Football League (VFL).

Pastore played his only senior game for Richmond in round six of the 1987 VFL season, in a loss to Melbourne at the MCG.

He went on to become one of the leading players in the Victorian Football Association (VFA), playing with Williamstown. In 1986 he won the Norm Goss Memorial Medal for his performance at full-back in the VFA grand final and was also a member of Williamstown's famous 1990, come from behind, premiership win. He was club captain in his final two seasons, 1996 and 1997.

In 2003, Pastore was named on the interchange bench in the official Williamstown "Team of the Century".
