= Coburg Football Club =

Australian rules football club

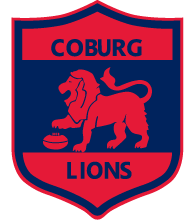

Names
- Full name: Coburg Football Club Limited
- Former name: Coburg-Fitzroy Football Club (1999–2000)
- Nickname(s): Lions, Burgers
- Former nickname: Tigers (2001–2013)
- Club song: Tune of "California, Here I Come"

2025 season
- After finals: VFL: DNQ; VAFA: DNQ
- Home-and-away season: VFL: 11th of 21; VAFA: 11th of 11

Club details
- Founded: 1891; 135 years ago
- Colours: Navy Red
- Competition: VFL: Men's; VAFA: Women's; FIDA: Mixed; EDFL: Juniors (mixed)
- President: Michelle Johnston
- Coach: Jamie Cassidy-McNamara
- Captain: Jesse Corigliano
- Premierships: VFA/VFL (6) (Note: All Coburg's premierships were won during the VFA era.): 1926; 1927; 1928; 1979; 1988; 1989
- Ground: Barry Plant Park (capacity: 15,000)

Uniforms
Home

Other information
- Official website: coburgfc.com.au

The Coburg Football Club, nicknamed the Lions, is an Australian rules football club based in the Melbourne suburb of Coburg. It has been based at Coburg City Oval since 1915.

Coburg's men's team currently plays in the Victorian Football League (VFL), while the women's team competed in the VAFA Women's (VAFAW) from 2023 to 2025. The club also has a team in the FIDA Football League, a competition for people with intellectual disabilities, and junior teams in the Essendon District Football League (EDFL).

== History ==
=== Early years ===
After competing in junior competitions, Coburg was always keen to be promoted up the ranks. They joined the Melbourne District Football Association (MDFA) and were premiers in 1913, 1914 and again in 1920 (premiers and champions), their strength helped them get promoted to the Victorian Football League reserves from 1921 until 1924, Coburg was admitted as a senior club in the Victorian Football Association in 1925 – as a response to Footscray, North Melbourne and Hawthorn joining the VFL

Coburg was immediately successful in the VFA, playing finals in its first season and winning three consecutive premierships from 1926 until 1928; however, these were the club's last top-division premiership for more than fifty years. Coburg was runners-up to the Northcote in three successive seasons from 1932 to 1934, and was also runners-up in 1941. The club was dominant in the junior/seconds competition from its inception in 1928 up to World War II, winning nine seconds premierships in thirteen seasons, including four in a row from 1937 until 1940.

Coburg has the second-highest number of reported players in a VFA match, which occurred in the 1933 grand final against Northcote.

The Lions gained prolific goalkickers Lance Collins and Bob Pratt during the 1930s and 1940s. Collins, in his first full season in 1936 (he was injured in 1935 and played one game), kicked 16, 12, 11 and 10 goals in separate games to kick 116 goals for the season; in 98 games for Coburg Football Club (VFA) his tally was 432 goals. Bob Pratt, who crossed from the VFL without a clearance early in the throw-pass era, kicked 183 goals in the 1941 VFA season for Coburg, which was then the highest number of goals kicked in a VFA season until Ron Todd of Williamstown (VFA) beat that record and kicked 188 goals in 1945. Pratt and Collins together hold the record for the most goals by two players in a season: they kicked a total of 256 goals in 1941. Pratt kicked 22 goals in a match against Sandringham Football Club: a club record.

=== 1965–1970: Financial struggle ===
The club's existence was threatened in 1965, when the City of Coburg leased Coburg Oval to the VFL's North Melbourne Football Club, leaving the club without a home ground. After going into debt attempting to fight the council's move, the club came to an arrangement to merge with North Melbourne, and fourteen committeemen left the club and moved to North Melbourne as part of the merge; but, dissenting committeemen and life members opposed to the merger formed a rival committee, and with the support of the VFA executive, were able to continue operating Coburg as a stand-alone club in 1965, playing games in Port Melbourne. The club's future was still in doubt until it could find a new permanent home ground; but North Melbourne's move to Coburg Oval, which was intended to be long-term, ended up lasting only one season, allowing Coburg to return to Coburg Oval and continue operating there from 1966 onwards.

The only J.J. Liston trophy winner for Coburg was Jim Sullivan in 1967. Prior to 1943 the Best and Fairest Award in the VFA was the 'Recorder Cup'. Coburg VFA winners were Peter Reville (ex-South Melbourne VFL) who was the equal winner in 1936 and E. "Snowy" Martin in 1927.

Sullivan was credited by club statistics to have amassed 54 kicks in a match in 1969, which is the second highest recorded in senior football competition and the highest in the VFA competition.

=== 1978–1990: Premierships and revival ===
After many years in the doldrums, the club enjoyed somewhat of a rebirth in the late 1970s, with a continued period of success until the 1990. During that time, the club won three flags (1979, 1988 and 1989), finished runner-up another two times (1980 and 1986) and won four minor premierships (1980, 1986, 1988 and 1989). Even so, the club's off-field position was not secure during this time, and the club was at risk of folding in 1982–83. VFA legend Phil Cleary was a member of all these games, as either a player or a coach.

=== 1990–1998: Lean years ===
After the success of the 1970s and 80s, the 1990s proved to be lean years for Coburg.

After the departure of club legend Phil Cleary as coach in 1992, the club hired the services of Alex Jeaseaulenko, who coached the club to a winless season in 1993.

Coburg would subsequently go onto finish last in both the 1997 and 1998 seasons.

=== 1999–2000: Coburg-Fitzroy Lions ===
For the 1999 and 2000 seasons, Coburg entered into a partnership with the Fitzroy Football Club.

Fitzroy, which had played in the VFA between 1884 and 1896, then in the VFL/AFL from 1897 until 1996, no longer operated a football team following the creation of the Brisbane Lions in late 1996, but it still had an administrative presence. Under what was effectively a sponsorship arrangement, Coburg became known as the Coburg-Fitzroy Lions, taking its new name at the beginning of August 1999. The club retained navy blue and red as its main colours, but adopted Fitzroy's red, royal blue and gold colours as an alternative strip.

Despite large crowds of both Lions fans attending the home games, financial problems and AFL pressure meant that Coburg were forced to align with an AFL reserves side, and the partnership with Fitzroy was severed at the end of the 2000 season.

=== 2001–2013: Richmond alignment ===
Coburg's logo when they were known as the Coburg Tigers in their alignment with Richmond

From 2001 until 2013, Coburg had an alignment in place with the AFL's Richmond Football Club, which saw Richmond's players eligible to play senior football for Coburg when not selected in the AFL. During this time, the club changed its nickname from the Lions to the Tigers. Its best performance during that time was during 2007, when the seniors finished as runners-up and the reserves side won the premiership. The reserve side won the premiership again in 2012 in the first year of the reserves competition being renamed the Development League.

=== 2014–present: Return of the Lions ===
The affiliation with the Richmond Football Club ended after the 2013 season; Coburg returned to operations as a stand-alone senior club in the VFL from 2014, and returned to the nickname "Lions". During this time, the club has been coached by Peter German (2014–2017), Leigh Adams (2018–2019), Andrew Sturgess (2020–2022), and Jamie Cassidy-McNamara (2023-present).

As a stand alone, Coburg consistently finished in the bottom four from 2014 till 2019, and even endured a winless season in 2023. However in the 2024 season, promising signs began to show under the coaching of Jamie Cassidy-McNamara, with Coburg narrowly missing finals in 2025 and 2026, but showing a greatly improved competitive edge throughout those seasons.

Coburg formed a women's team in 2020, with a plan to join the VFL Women's competition in 2021. However, the plan did not eventuate.

Instead, in 2021 two Coburg sides competed in the Premier and Second Division of the South Eastern Women's Football (SEWF) competition. Both teams entered the VAFA Women's (VAFAW) ahead of the 2023 season.

== Club symbols ==
1925

2001

2014

2015

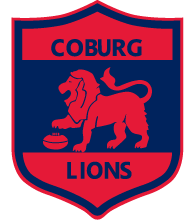
2025

Coburg competed as the Lions from 1925 until 2001. The logo was presented in a shield format and was used until the Richmond alignment in 2001. Under its alignment with Richmond, the club changed its logo and its nickname to the Tigers. The design of the Tiger is based around Richmond's logo, which was identical at the time. The colour scheme was changed to match that of Coburg's so the club could still have some of its identity. This was the logo until the severing of the link in 2013. The club went back to its roots in 2014, and became the Lions again. The lion was back on the emblem. However, the scroll remained from the Lions' tenure with the Tigers. A modernised logo featuring a body-less lion head was created for the 2015 season. The current logo was introduced in 2025 and is a near-replica of the original patch from 1925, with the "Coburg Lions" name emblazoned on the top and bottom of the crest and only the old VFA logo removed from the design.

=== Rivalries ===
The club has strong rivalries with Port Melbourne and Williamstown. The rivalry with Port Melbourne stems from both clubs particularly spiteful encounters throughout the 1980 VFA season culminating in the 1980 grand final which Port won by 11 points. This was added to further in 2018 when Lions captain Tom Goodwin walked out of the club to play for Port Melbourne and later in 2021 when its star midfielder Marcus Lentini also joined the Borough. The rivalry with Williamstown originated in the 1980s. After the Seagulls narrowly beat Coburg to claim the 1986 VFA premiership, the Lions would go back to back in 1988 and 1989 beating Williamstown on both occasions.

=== Home ground ===
Coburg City Oval has the home ground of the Coburg Football Club throughout its history, except in 1965, when it served as the home of the North Melbourne Football Club in the VFL season; during that season, Coburg played its home matches at North Port Oval in Port Melbourne. The ground has a grandstand on the southern end near the goals. Terraces surround the rest of the ground. The capacity of the ground is 15,000, and the highest attendance recorded was 21,695. There are seats for approximately 3,000–5,000 people. In the early 2000's Coburg City Oval was known as Proton Oval, from 2007-2010 it was known as ABD Group Stadium and from 2011 to 2013, it was known as Mantello Holden Oval. In 2014, the club signed a three-year naming rights deal with Piranha Foods Snack Food Manufacture | Snack Food Supplier | Snack foods, with the ground to be known as Piranha Park - this arrangement lasted until 2024. In March 2025 it was announced that Coburg City Oval would be known as Barry Plant Park having signed a five year deal with Barry Plant Coburg/Brunswick.

From early 2020 to May 2021 the ground underwent a much needed redevelopment, with works done on the grandstand, club offices, club facilities, and ground drainage.

== Community ==
Coburg is seen as a leader in the football world for its work in the local Merri-bek community.

They have close ties with indigenous community through their NAIDOC week game, and also hold the annual Vicky Cleary game, which is a domestic violence awareness raiser dedicated to the late sister of club legend Phil Cleary, who was tragically killed by an ex-partner in 1987.

The club also competes in the Essendon District Football League's junior competition as the Coburg Junior Football Club.

== Club song ==
Original club song until 1999 - to the tune of "California Here I Come".

We are Coburg Boys you know
Coburg coaches tell us so
We’ll kill ‘em
We’ll thrill ‘em
We’ll tear them in two
Were triers
Were fliers
We’re the boys in red and blue
And when we reach that final four
Then we’ll kick those goals galore
Then you’ll hear those lions roar
Oh yes Coburg, We’ll be there

The club song is to the tune of "California Here I Come". During the club's affiliation with Richmond, the word 'Lions' was replaced with 'Tigers'.

We're the Coburg pride you know
All our coaches tell us so
We're faster
We're stronger
We'll dominate you
We're triers
We're flyers
We're the team of Red and Blue
And when we reach that final four
Then we'll kick those goals galore
Then you'll hear those Lions roar
Oh yes Coburg will be there

An alternative version based on Richmond's club song was also used during the affiliation years.

Oh, we're from Coburg town
A fighting fury, we're from Coburg town
In any weather, you will see us with a grin
Risking head or shin
If we're behind, then never mind
We'll fight and fight and win
For we're from Coburg town
We never weaken 'till the final siren's gone
Like the burgers of old
We're strong and we're bold
Oh we're from Coburg
The red and the blue
Oh we're from Coburg town

== Club records ==
=== Club ===
Premierships
Competition	Level	Wins	Years won
Victorian Football League	Seniors (Division 1)	6	1926, 1927, 1928, 1979, 1988, 1989
Victorian Football League	Seniors (Division 2)	2	1970, 1974
VFA/VFL Reserves	Division 1	18	1928, 1929, 1930, 1934, 1935, 1937, 1938, 1939, 1940, 1947, 1950, 1958, 1962, 1975, 1976, 1990, 2007, 2012
VFA/VFL Reserves	Division 2	1	1974
VFA/VFL Thirds	Division 1	2	1961, 1988
Other titles and honours
Lightning Premiership	Seniors	2	1972, 1976
Finishing positions
Victorian Football League (Division 1)	Minor premiership	8	1926, 1927, 1928, 1945, 1980, 1986, 1988, 1989
Victorian Football League (Division 1)	Grand Finalists	8	1932, 1933, 1934, 1941, 1959, 1980, 1986, 2007
Victorian Football League (Division 1)	Wooden spoons	6	1968, 1973, 1993, 1997, 1998, 2018, 2023

=== Individual ===
Games records

Dave Starbuck holds the club record for games, with 219, played mostly in the 1950s. He is closely followed by cult figure, Vin "The Tank" Taranto, who played during the 1980s and the dark days of the 1990s, when the club was at its lowest and almost folded. Third on the games list, on 205 games, is Cleary.

J.J. Liston Trophy
Player	Year won
Ernie Martin	1927
Peter Reville	1936
Jim Sullivan	1967
Gary Sheldon	1988
Ezra Poyas	2001

Norm Goss Medallists
Player	Years won
Tim Rieniets	1988, 1989

Fothergill–Round Medallists
Player	Year won
Mark Porter	1993
Kristian De Pasquale	2001
Luke Ryan	2016

A.Todd Medallists
Player	Year won
Colin Bamford	1940
G. McLay	1946
Jim Clapton	1951
Alan Salter	1952
Rodney Wescombe	1979
Alan Eade	1981
Kevin Dinale	1984
Alan Sutherland	1988
Glen Carrick	2008

Fred Hill Memorial Medal
Player	Year won
Steven Foster	2007
Ozgur Uysal	2012

=== Team of the Century ===
Coburg Team of the Century (Note: Includes three emergency players: John Harris, Jack Rogan and Allen Eade.)
B:	Bob Atkinson	Ron Promnitz	Trevor Price
HB:	Dave Starbuck	Brad Nimmo	Tony Tancredi
C:	Alan Mannix	Jim Sullivan	Gary Sheldon
HF:	Lance Collins	Bill Byron	Laurie Burt
F:	Ken Ingram	Bob Pratt	Brian Allison
Foll:	Jim Jenkins	Colin Hobbs	Clarrie Mears
Int:	Ray Jordon	Harry Kerley	Mick Erwin
Int:	Jack Condon	Tim Rieniets	Mark Weideman
Coach:	Phil Cleary		
