= 1933 VFA season =

1933 VFA premiership season
- Teams: 12
- Premiers: Northcote; 3rd premiership
- Minor premiers: Northcote; 3rd minor premiership

The 1933 VFA season was the 55th season of the Victorian Football Association (VFA), an Australian rules football competition played in the state of Victoria. The premiership was won by the Northcote Football Club, after it defeated Coburg by 16 points in the Grand Final on 7 October. It was the club's third VFA premiership, and the second in a sequence of three premierships won consecutively from 1932 until 1934.

== Central ground ==
Through 1933, the Association secured the Motordrome (which was renamed Olympic Park during the season after its concrete motor racing track was demolished) to use as a central venue. The venue hosted all finals, and served as a neutral venue for some home-and-home matches. Moves to expand its use as a central venue in 1934 led to a dispute between the Association and the councils which ran the suburban grounds.

== Premiership ==
The home-and-home season was played over twenty-two matches, before the top four clubs contested a finals series to determine the premiers for the season. The finals series was played for the first time under the Page–McIntyre system, which replaced the amended Argus system which had been in use since 1903.

Starting from this season, percentage was calculated as the number of points scored per hundred points conceded, which is consistent with the modern definition. Until this year, it had been calculated as points conceded per hundred points scored.

=== Ladder ===
1933 VFA ladder
Pos	Team	Pld	W	L	D	PF	PA	PP	Pts
1	Northcote (P)	22	16	4	2	2127	1649	129.0	68
2	Coburg	22	15	6	1	1954	1699	115.0	62
3	Yarraville	22	15	7	0	2160	1726	125.1	60
4	Port Melbourne	22	14	7	1	2094	1728	121.2	58
5	Sandringham	22	13	8	1	2120	1838	115.3	54
6	Preston	22	12	9	1	2018	1763	114.5	48 (Note: 2 points deducted?)
7	Camberwell	22	12	10	0	2152	1970	109.2	48
8	Brighton	22	9	12	1	2014	2167	92.9	38
9	Williamstown	22	7	15	0	1592	1956	81.4	28
10	Oakleigh	22	7	15	0	1689	2203	76.7	28
11	Prahran	22	5	16	1	1855	2240	82.8	22
12	Brunswick	22	3	19	0	1458	2297	63.5	12

Rules for classification: 1) points; 2) percentage; 3) number of points for.
(P) Premiers

=== Finals ===
	Semifinals
Saturday, 16 September	Yarraville 7.10 (52)	def. by	Port Melbourne 7.13 (55)	Olympic Park (crowd: 4,000)
Saturday, 23 September	Northcote 11.22 (88)	def. by	Coburg 13.14 (92)	Olympic Park (crowd: 5,000)

	Preliminary Final
Saturday, 30 September	Northcote 13.9 (87)	def.	Port Melbourne 9.10 (64)	Olympic Park (crowd: 6,000)

==== Grand Final ====
1933 VFA Grand Final
Saturday, 7 October	Coburg	def. by	Northcote	Olympic Park (crowd: 12,000)
4.1 (25); 6.8 (44); 8.11 (59); 9.16 (70)	Q1; Q2; Q3; Final	3.8 (26); 5.11 (41); 7.15 (57); 11.20 (86)	Umpires: McKinnon
Duncan 3, Mears 3, Geuer, Harris, Kight	Goals	Ross 3, Seymour 2, Bray 2, Byrne 2, Goullet
Rudolph, for kicking Rowe; Stockdale, for striking Bray; Duncan, for striking Hart in the final quarter Stockdale, for wrestling with Rowe in the final quarter Stockdale, for rubbing his knuckles on the face of Rowe in the final quarter Rudolph, for striking Goullet; Rudolph, for striking Bray in the final quarter Rudolph, for striking Corrigan in the final quarter	Reports	Rowe for striking Rudolph in the second quarter Bray, for striking Stockdale; Bray, for striking Rudolph in the final quarter Hart, for striking Duncan in the final quarter Rowe, for wrestling with Stockdale in the final quarter Rowe, for rubbing his knuckles on the face of Stockdale in the final quarter Bray, for striking Rudolph in the final quarter Corrigan, for striking Rudolph in the final quarter Connell, for striking Lowe in the second quarter

== Awards ==
- Bill Luff (Camberwell) was the leading goalkicker for the season; he kicked 106 goals in the home-and-home season and did not participate in finals.
- In addition to the Recorder Cup, a second Association best-and-fairest award, known as the Association Medal or V.F.A. Medal, was introduced in 1933 under a different voting system.
  - Charlie Stanbridge (Williamstown) won the Recorder Cup, polling seven votes. L. Smith (Northcote) finished second with six votes, and Dave Withers (Oakleigh) finished third with 4½ votes.
  - The Association Medal was jointly won by Charlie Stanbridge (Williamstown) and Dave Withers (Oakleigh), who each polled 36 votes; Bob Ross (Northcote) finished third with 32 votes.
- Brunswick won the seconds premiership for the third consecutive time. Brunswick 9.19 (73) defeated Port Melbourne 3.12 (30) in the Grand Final on Thursday 28 September (Show Day holiday) at Coburg.

== See also ==
- List of VFA premiers
