= Battle of Bell Street =

Australian rules football rivalry

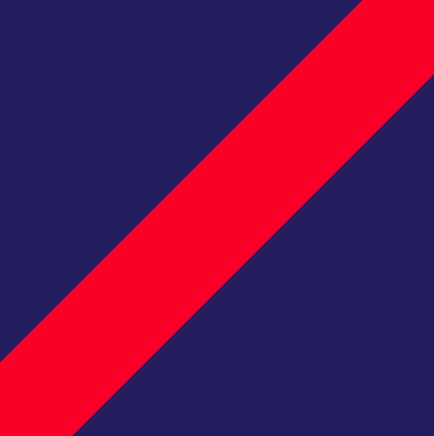
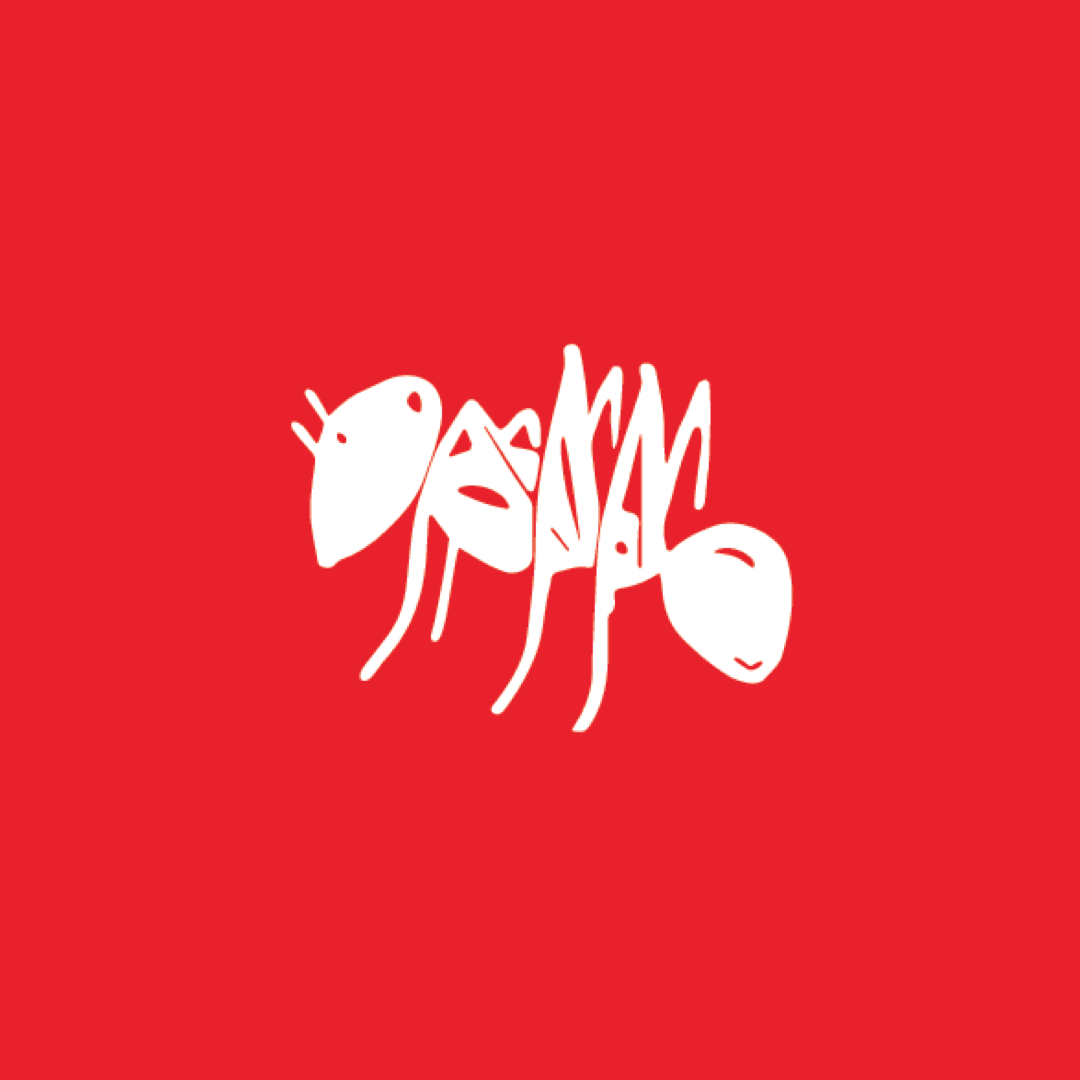
- Coburg Preston
- First meeting: 7 June 1926 (Preston 69−112 Coburg)
- Latest meeting: 27 July 2025 (Northern 70−85 Coburg)

Statistics
- Total meetings: 163
- All-time series (seniors only): Northern: 81 wins Coburg: 79 wins

The Battle of Bell Street was an Australian rules football rivalry, contested by the Coburg Football Club (Note: Competed as Coburg-Fitzroy from 1999−2000; affiliated with the Richmond Football Club from 2001−2013.) and the Preston Football Club (Note: Known as the Northern Bullants from 2000−2011 and 2021−2025; affiliated with the Carlton Football Club from 2003−2020; known as the Northern Blues from 2012−2020.) between 1926 and 2025. It was one of the oldest rivalries in the Victorian Football League (VFL), which was known as the Victorian Football Association (VFA) until 1996.

The clubs met 163 times, with Preston winning 81 times. Preston's VFL licence was revoked at the end of the 2025 season, before the club entered voluntary liquidation several months later.

== History ==
Coburg and the Bullants are closely located, with their respective home grounds of Coburg City Oval and Preston City Oval divided by Bell Street in Preston (hence the name of the rivalry).

The first clash was on 7 June 1926, with Coburg defeating Preston by 43 points. Preston's first win was a 29-point victory on 6 July 1929.

No match between the clubs occurred in the cancelled 2020 season, nor in the 2022 season.

== Notable matches ==
=== 1973 relegation match ===
Heading into the final round of the 1973 VFA season, Preston were sitting in last place on the Division 1 ladder, although their percentage was slightly higher than Coburg's, who were in second-last place. The teams faced each other in round 18, with the winner able to avoid relegation to Division 2 for the 1974 season.

The lead changed eight times during the match, but Preston were able to win in part to Coburg's inaccuracy, with the Bullants kicking 7.2 to Coburg's 2.8 in the final quarter. Coburg full-forward Shane McCarthy kicked five behinds, including missing several shots directly in front of goal, before kicking his only goal for the match. Ultimately, Preston won the match 27.9 (171) to 22.22 (154), with Coburg relegated to Division 2.

A crowd of 13,000 people attended the match at Coburg City Oval, which The Age reported was the largest crowd of the 1973 home-and-away season.

== Results ==
=== Seniors ===
#	Year	Rd	Home		Away		Ground	Date	Winner	M	H2H	Ref
#	Year	Rd	Team	Score	Team	Score	Ground	Date	Winner	M	H2H	Ref
1	1926	6	Preston	10.9 (69)	Coburg	16.16 (112)	Preston City Oval	5 Jun	COB	43	+1	
2	1926	15	Coburg	17.18 (120)	Preston	7.9 (51)	Coburg City Oval	7 Aug	COB	69	+2	
3	1927	6	Coburg	13.22 (100)	Preston	10.16 (76)	Coburg City Oval	4 Jun	COB	24	+3	
4	1927	15	Preston	13.21 (99)	Coburg	22.7 (139)	Preston City Oval	6 Aug	COB	40	+4	
5	1928	1	Preston	7.15 (57)	Coburg	11.12 (78)	Preston City Oval	21 Apr	COB	21	+5	
6	1928	10	Coburg	14.11 (95)	Preston	6.11 (47)	Coburg City Oval	23 Jun	COB	48	+6	
7	1929	2	Preston	7.9 (51)	Coburg	8.12 (60)	Preston City Oval	27 Apr	COB	9	+7	
8	1929	13	Coburg	10.13 (73)	Preston	14.12 (96)	Coburg City Oval	6 Jul	PRE	23	+6	
9	1930	6	Coburg	11.14 (80)	Preston	10.20 (80)	Coburg City Oval	3 May	DRAW	0	+6	
10	1930	13	Preston	17.10 (112)	Coburg	11.11 (77)	Preston City Oval	19 Jul	PRE	35	+5	
11	1930	19	Preston	9.15 (69)	Coburg	13.13 (91)	Preston City Oval	30 Aug	COB	22	+6	
12	1931	2	Preston	13.16 (94)	Coburg	14.7 (91)	Preston City Oval	2 May	PRE	3	+5	
13	1931	18	Coburg	6.11 (47)	Preston	7.11 (53)	Coburg City Oval	19 Jul	PRE	6	+4	
14	1932	2	Coburg	13.12 (90)	Preston	13.13 (91)	Coburg City Oval	30 Apr	PRE	1	+3	
15	1932	SF	Coburg	11.9 (75)	Preston	8.20 (68)	Coburg City Oval	10 Sep	COB	7	+4	
	1995	5	Coburg	13.9 (87)	Preston	18.13 (121)	Coburg City Oval	21 May	PRE	34		
	1995	14	Preston	10.13 (73)	Coburg	4.3 (27)	Preston City Oval	30 Jul	PRE	46		
	1996	6	Coburg	15.9 (99)	Preston	8.19 (67)	Preston City Oval	11 May	COB	32		
	2000	2	Northern Bullants	7.12 (54)	Coburg-Fitzroy	23.21 (159)	Preston City Oval	26 Mar	COB	105		
	2000	16	Coburg-Fitzroy	11.10 (76)	Northern Bullants	17.9 (111)	Coburg City Oval	9 Jul	NBLU	35		
	2014	13	Northern Blues	9.15 (69)	Coburg	12.6 (78)	Preston City Oval	3 May	COB	9		
156	2018	19	Northern Blues	15.6 (96)	Coburg	12.8 (80)	Preston City Oval	11 Aug	NBLU	16	+3	
157	2019	10	Northern Blues	14.15 (99)	Coburg	13.4 (82)	Preston City Oval	9 Jun	NBLU	17	+4	
—N/a	2020	12	Coburg	—	Northern Blues	—	Highgate Reserve	20 Jun	—	—	+4	
158	2021	13	Coburg	12.10 (82)	Northern Bullants	12.11 (83)	Coburg City Oval	11 Jul	NBUL	1	+5	
159	2023	8	Coburg	12.8 (80)	Northern Bullants	12.15 (87)	Coburg City Oval	13 May	NBUL	7	+6	
160	2024	13	Coburg	10.12 (72)	Northern Bullants	8.11 (59)	Coburg City Oval	23 Jun	COB	13	+5	
161	2024	20	Northern Bullants	13.10 (88)	Coburg	13.13 (91)	Preston City Oval	11 Aug	COB	3	+4	
162	2025	8	Coburg	15.9 (99)	Northern Bullants	10.9 (69)	Coburg City Oval	18 May	COB	30	+3	
163	2025	18	Northern Bullants	9.16 (70)	Coburg	13.7 (85)	Preston City Oval	27 Jul	COB	15	+2	

== Harold Martin Medal ==
Since 2021, the Harold Martin Medal has been awarded to the player judged best on ground in the Battle of Bell Street. It is named after Harold Martin, who was the captain-coach of Preston before moving to Coburg as its coach in 1982.

=== Winners ===
Year	Rd	Winner	Ref
2021	13	Daniel Hughes	
2023	8	Cam Wild	
2024	13	Deacon Kalpakis	
2024	20	Joel Trudgeon	
2025	8	Jack Bytel	
2025	18	Sam Donegan	

== See also ==
- Vicki Cleary Day
- Rivalries in the Victorian Football League
