= 1936 VFA season =

Australian football season

1936 VFA premiership season
- Teams: 12
- Premiers: Northcote; 5th premiership
- Minor premiers: Brunswick; 2nd minor premiership

The 1936 VFA season was the 58th season of the Victorian Football Association (VFA), an Australian rules football competition played in the state of Victoria. The premiership was won by the Northcote Football Club, after it came from fourth on the ladder to defeat Prahran by 15 points in the Grand Final on 12 September. It was the club's fifth VFA premiership, all won between 1929 and 1936, and it was the last top division VFA premiership ever won by the club before it left the Association in 1987.

== Premiership ==
The home-and-home season was played over eighteen matches, before the top four clubs contested a finals series under the Page–McIntyre system to determine the premiers for the season.

=== Ladder ===
1936 VFA ladder
Pos	Team	Pld	W	L	D	PF	PA	PP	Pts
1	Brunswick	18	16	2	0	2063	1395	147.9	64
2	Prahran	18	14	3	1	1896	1363	139.1	58
3	Camberwell	18	12	6	0	1882	1553	121.2	48
4	Northcote (P)	18	11	6	1	1639	1339	122.4	46
5	Brighton	18	11	7	0	1545	1501	102.9	44
6	Preston	18	10	8	0	1739	1597	108.9	40
7	Coburg	18	9	9	0	1920	1562	122.9	36
8	Williamstown	18	7	11	0	1185	1632	72.6	28
9	Yarraville	18	6	12	0	1637	1756	93.2	24
10	Oakleigh	18	5	13	0	1573	1898	82.9	20
11	Sandringham	18	4	14	0	1394	2137	65.2	16
12	Port Melbourne	18	2	16	0	1263	2003	63.1	8

Rules for classification: 1) points; 2) percentage; 3) number of points for.
(P) Premiers

=== Finals ===
	Semifinals
Saturday, 22 August	Camberwell 8.16 (64)	def. by	Northcote 18.15 (123)	Toorak Park (crowd: 7,000)
Saturday, 29 August	Brunswick 14.14 (98)	def. by	Prahran 15.18 (108)	Toorak Park

	Preliminary Final
Saturday, 5 September	Brunswick 9.13 (67)	def. by	Northcote 14.10 (94)	Brunswick Cricket Ground (crowd: 10,000)

1936 VFA Grand Final
Saturday, 12 September	Prahran	def. by	Northcote	Toorak Park (crowd: 12,000)
1.3 (9); 8.8 (56); 11.10 (76); 15.15 (105)	Q1; Q2; Q3; Final	7.2 (44); 7.4 (46); 13.6 (84); 19.6 (120)
Hawkins 4, White 4, Gravell 3, Hyde 2, Thompson 2	Goals	Ross 5, Seymour 4, Bates 3, Gray 3, Downie 2, Hart, O'Keefe

== Awards ==
- Lance Collins (Coburg) was the leading goalkicker for the season; he kicked 116 goals in the home-and-home season and did not participate in the finals.
- In the parallel Association best and fairest awards:
  - Bert Hyde (Preston) and Peter Reville (Coburg), both in their first season of Association football, jointly won the Recorder Cup, each polling five votes. Neville Huggins (Williamstown), S. Plumridge (Port Melbourne) and Les White (Prahran) were equal third with four votes apiece.
  - The Association Medal was won by Neville Huggins (Williamstown), who polled 33 votes; Bert Hyde (Preston) finished second with 32 votes, and Les White (Prahran) was third with 27 votes.
- Brunswick won the seconds premiership. Brunswick 11.11 (77) defeated Coburg 10.12 (72) in the Grand Final on Saturday 12 September at the Brunswick Cricket Ground.

== Notable events ==
- In the seconds match between Port Melbourne and Northcote on June 13, Port Melbourne vice-captain Robert Rowe suffered a fractured skull in a head clash with a Northcote opponent. He suffered meningitis as a result of the injury, and died eight days later.
- In the final round of home-and-away matches, Preston 10.11 (71) trailed Brunswick 17.19 (121) by 50 points at three-quarter time, before kicking 8.10 (58) to no score with the wind in the final quarter to win the game by eight points, 18.21 (129) d. 17.19 (121). The comeback set a new record for the largest final quarter comeback in VFA history, which stood until 1940. So strong was the wind affecting the match that only two behinds out of the total 250 points were kicked to the northern end of Preston City Oval; and, the ball kept being blown so far beyond the southern goal that the extra time required to repeatedly retrieve it saw Preston's comeback finish in semi-darkness.
- A charity game for the benefit of the sportsmen's ward at Prince Henry's Hospital was held on the evening of Thursday 24 September (Show Day holiday) at Olympic Park between combined teams representing the Victorian Football League and the Victorian Football Association. The attendance was 2,000. The League 14.15 (99) defeated the Association 10.10 (70).

== See also ==
- List of VFA/VFL Premiers
