= 1929 VFA season =

1929 VFA premiership season
- Teams: 12
- Premiers: Northcote; 1st premiership
- Minor premiers: Northcote; 1st minor premiership

The 1929 VFA season was the 51st season of the Victorian Football Association (VFA), an Australian rules football competition played in the state of Victoria.

Northcote won the VFA premiership for the first time, after defeating Port Melbourne by 42 points in the 1929 VFA Grand Final.

== Association membership ==
Two new clubs − Oakleigh and Sandringham − entered the VFA, bringing the size of the Association to twelve clubs (the largest it had been since 1896). This was the last change to the Association membership until 1951.

=== Oakleigh admission ===
In November 1928, the Oakleigh Football Club applied to join the Association. Oakleigh had been a successful club in the Sub-District Association, had a good quality ground, the growing suburb of Oakleigh provided the team strong support, and the club had been previously considered for Association membership. Oakleigh's application was accepted unanimously.

=== Sandringham admission ===
The first steps towards establishing a semi-professional football team from the Sandringham area were made in 1927, with the Black Rock Football Club (Black Rock Amateurs), the Hampton Football Club, the Sandringham Amateur Football Club and the Sandringham District Football Club discussing the viability of amalgamating to form a team in the VFA. The proposal failed after a meeting of club representatives on 17 February 1927 despite Sandringham Amateurs "unreservedly" favouring the concept, as Black Rock was unable to field a team, Hampton opposed the merger on the grounds of losing local identity, and Sandringham District wanted at least three clubs involved. All four clubs competed in the Metropolitan Amateur Football Association (MAFA) for the 1927 season. On 15 August 1927, four other clubs merged to form the Sandringham Football Club.

On 17 February 1928, Sandringham, Sandringham District and the Sandringham United Football Club amalgamated to form a new Sandringham Football Club. This was, however, effectively a continuation of the Sandringham Amateurs. The club entered two teams in the MAFA and one team in the Federal Football Association (FFA) junior competition for the 1928 season. The second Sandringham team in the MAFA (known as Sandringham B) withdrew from C Section in August 1928 after having a record score kicked against them.

Sandringham was told by the VFA in November 1928 that it would be admitted into the competition if it obtained permission to build a fence around Beach Road Oval; the lack of a fence had prevented the club from entering for the 1928 VFA season. In January 1929, the Sandringham Council supported a bid from an (apparently new) senior Sandringham Football Club to enter the VFA. The bid was successful, and Sandringham was accepted into the Association on 4 February 1929.

Despite the admission, the club still faced a challenge prior to its first game. Sandringham applied for the use of Beach Road Oval for its reserves team (Second Eighteen) on Saturdays, but Sandringham Amateurs − returning to the MAFA for the 1929 season − also applied for its use, having played at the ground for 20 years. Sandringham Amateurs requested for use on alternate Saturdays and during the week for training purposes, while Sandringham said its VFA bid would have to be abandoned if it did not have access to the ground. Ultimately, Sandringham Council choose to allow the Amateurs to continue using the ground. Sandringham's VFA reserves team instead played its home games at Tulip Street Reserve. The club wore the colours of gold, black and blue, taken from Sandringham Amateurs, Black Rock and Hampton.

== Premiership ==
To accommodate a balanced fixture with the two extra clubs, the home-and-home season was extended from eighteen matches to twenty-two matches, the longest it had been since fixed-length seasons were first introduced in 1894. Then, the top four clubs contested a finals series under the amended Argus system to determine the premiers for the season.

=== Ladder ===
1929 VFA ladder
| Pos | Team | Pld | W | L | D | PF | PA | PP | Pts |
|---|---|---|---|---|---|---|---|---|---|
| 1 | Northcote (P) | 22 | 17 | 5 | 0 | 2099 | 1400 | 66.7 | 68 |
| 2 | Port Melbourne | 22 | 17 | 5 | 0 | 1804 | 1391 | 77.1 | 68 |
| 3 | Preston | 22 | 16 | 6 | 0 | 1992 | 1461 | 73.3 | 64 |
| 4 | Brunswick | 22 | 15 | 6 | 1 | 1931 | 1615 | 83.6 | 62 |
| 5 | Oakleigh | 22 | 15 | 7 | 0 | 1717 | 1381 | 80.4 | 60 |
| 6 | Coburg | 22 | 14 | 7 | 1 | 1726 | 1476 | 85.5 | 58 |
| 7 | Yarraville | 22 | 11 | 11 | 0 | 1804 | 1636 | 90.7 | 44 |
| 8 | Williamstown | 22 | 9 | 13 | 0 | 1473 | 1605 | 109.0 | 36 |
| 9 | Brighton | 22 | 8 | 13 | 1 | 1716 | 1805 | 105.2 | 34 |
| 10 | Prahran | 22 | 5 | 16 | 1 | 1543 | 1768 | 114.6 | 22 |
| 11 | Camberwell | 22 | 2 | 20 | 0 | 1438 | 2347 | 163.2 | 8 |
| 12 | Sandringham | 22 | 1 | 21 | 0 | 1336 | 2803 | 209.8 | 4 |

Rules for classification: 1) points; 2) percentage; 3) number of points for.
(P) Premiers

=== Finals ===
| | Semifinals |
| Saturday, 14 September | Port Melbourne 10.15 (75) | def. | Brunswick 9.14 (68) | Coburg Cricket Ground (crowd: 17,000) |
| Saturday, 21 September | Northcote 9.10 (64) | def. | Preston 7.8 (50) | Brunswick Cricket Ground (crowd: 13,500) |

| | Final |
| Saturday, 28 September | Northcote 9.17 (71) | drew with | Port Melbourne 10.11 (71) | Coburg Cricket Ground (crowd: 13,500) |
| Saturday, 5 October | Northcote 6.15 (51) | def. by | Port Melbourne 8.7 (55) | Melbourne Cricket Ground (crowd: 21,217) |

1929 VFA Grand Final
Saturday, 12 October | Northcote | def. | Port Melbourne | Melbourne Cricket Ground (crowd: 17,304)
3.3 (21); 10.10 (70); 12.13 (85); 15.21 (111) | Q1; Q2; Q3; Final | 2.5 (17); 5.5 (35); 8.9 (57); 10.9 (69) | Umpires: McKinnon
Pruser 4, Seymour 3, Cole 2, Gray 2, Heenan, Koop, Milne, Rowe | Goals | Kuhlken 4, Plumridge 2, Carpenter, Hyde, Perrett, Skilton
Wilson (hip) | Injuries | Perrett (ankles), Crompton (hip), Crossan (arm)
Towers, for fighting with Lovett | Reports | Lovett, for fighting with Towers

== Awards ==
- Leo McInerney (Brunswick) was the leading goalkicker, with 88 goals in the home-and-home season and 92 goals overall.
- Ted Bourke (Sandringham) won the Recorder Cup as the Association's best and fairest, polling nine votes. W. Brown (Yarraville) finished second with eight votes, and C. Irwin (Brighton) finished third with seven votes.
- Coburg won the seconds (Victorian Junior Football Association) premiership. Coburg 14.16 (100) defeated Williamstown 14.7 (91) at the Oakleigh Cricket Ground on 28 September.

== Notable events ==
- J. J. Liston, president and delegate of the Williamstown Football Club, was elected president of the Association at the annual general meeting in February 1929, replacing long-serving president John Aikman, who had died in 1928. Liston served in the position until his death in 1944.

== See also ==
- List of VFA premiers
