= 1934 VFA season =

1934 VFA premiership season
- Teams: 12
- Premiers: Northcote; 4th premiership
- Minor premiers: Northcote; 4th minor premiership

The 1934 VFA season was the 56th season of the Victorian Football Association (VFA), an Australian rules football competition played in the state of Victoria. The premiership was won by the Northcote Football Club, after it defeated Coburg by 61 points in the Grand Final on 6 October. It was the club's fourth VFA premiership, and the third in a sequence of three premierships won consecutively from 1932 until 1934; Coburg was defeated in all three Grand Finals in the sequence.

The season was threatened by a dispute in the off-season between the Association and the local councils which controlled many of the suburban home venues relating to the use of Olympic Park as a central ground; there were ultimately no disruptions after the dispute was resolved shortly before the start of the season.

== Central ground dispute ==
=== Lease of the Motordrome/Olympic Park ===
In late 1932, the Association began negotiating with Melbourne Carnivals Limited to lease the Motordrome to use as a central ground. The Association intended that one match would be played on the Motordrome each Saturday during the home-and-away season, with each club expected to play one or two of its home games at the central ground instead of at its suburban home venue – the same way that the Victorian Football League would later utilise VFL Park in the 1970s and 1980s; all finals would also be played at the Motordrome. An eight-year deal was signed in May 1933, securing the venue until the end of 1940. Under the arrangement, the Association would play one of its two leading games each round at the venue, and Melbourne Carnivals Limited would upgrade facilities such as grandstands, change rooms and fencing. Sporadic home-and-home matches were played at the venue in 1933, the first taking place in June, and all 1933 finals were held there; the intention was that the full arrangement would come into effect in 1934.

The Motordrome itself underwent significant upgrades during 1933. The banked concrete motor racing circuit was demolished and replaced with a flat dirt track; this was not required by the agreement with the Association, and was simply because the surface, built in 1924, was no longer suitable for the higher powered vehicles which raced on it. In June 1933, the venue was renamed Olympic Park.

=== Dispute with the Grounds Management Association ===
The push to use Olympic Park as a central ground was strongly opposed by the Grounds Management Association, a body made up of delegates representing the local councils which owned and maintained the suburban football grounds. The Grounds Management Association had several complaints:

- Football on the local grounds was a major source of revenue for the councils
- The councils had spent many thousands of pounds to upgrade the venues during the 1920s, including fencing and grandstands, and it expected its ratepayers to get value for that investment by playing games on those grounds
- The councils were concerned about the loss of earnings by local traders on game days
- The councils were keen for good quality football to be staged in their municipalities, and did not want to see the best games shifted away.

The Association increased admission fees in 1933, to which the Grounds Management Association also objected.

The councils held a strong position, as they controlled the use of their grounds, and could ban clubs from using them should they have so wished; some councils made threats to that effect during 1933. The Association guaranteed financial compensation to the affected councils – with offers including up to 15% of the Olympic Park gate and the right to sublet the ground on the day of any games which were moved – and while some of the councils accepted these offers, many others stood firm.

In November 1933, with full enactment of the central ground agreement looming for the 1934 season, the Grounds Management Association issued an ultimatum that it would ban Association clubs from all of its grounds if the agreement with Melbourne Carnivals Limited was not rescinded by 21 December; the clubs stood firm, and the councils followed through, banning seven clubs – Coburg, Preston, Northcote, Brunswick, Williamstown, Port Melbourne and Camberwell – from using their grounds for training or matches until further notice.

=== Resolution ===
After the ultimatum was enacted, planning for the 1934 VFA season was severely disrupted. The Grounds Management Association put forward a proposal for the seven teams whose grounds it controlled to secede from the Association and start a new competition which was not tied to a lease at Olympic Park; and, it tried to entice the Association to rescind the agreement by offering its own venues for finals rent-free for two years, and thereafter at a generous charge of 6% of the gate, cf. the charge of 10% specified in the agreement with Olympic Park. The Association made contingency plans to provide alternative venues, not controlled by the Grounds Management Association, for its clubs to move to if required; some clubs such as Coburg were expected to be unwilling or unable to move, so the Association looked for junior clubs able to replace them.

The Victorian Football League also took a keen interest in the dispute. The Association grounds were of good quality and high capacity in suburbs with strong population growth, and the League feared that the councils would lease the grounds to other sports, such as rugby and soccer, giving those sports a fillip which would be detrimental to football's long-term popularity in Melbourne. The Preston council, for example, already had a better offer to lease its ground to the local soccer club. As such, the League expressed a willingness to intervene, and potentially play some of its own games at Olympic Park, or even take over the Association's lease, as a means of providing some financial incentive or compensation to Melbourne Carnivals Limited should it allow the Association to break its lease.

The dispute finally ended on 27 March 1934. It was agreed that Olympic Park would continue to be used for all finals matches, but that the suburban grounds would host all home-and-away matches; and, one delegate from the Grounds Management Association was given a position on the Victorian Football Association committee. Melbourne Carnivals Ltd agreed to amend the agreement, and went on to lease the ground to the Hakoah soccer club on Saturdays. All clubs were allowed back onto their grounds, and a full fixture featuring all twelve teams was released that same night.

Had no compromise been reached, it is likely that Coburg, Preston, Port Melbourne and Northcote would all have transferred to other competitions or disbanded entirely.

=== Aftermath ===
Ironically, the 1934 Grand Final was played at neither Olympic Park, nor any of the suburban grounds. The match was originally scheduled for Olympic Park on 29 September, but was postponed due to inclement weather; however, Olympic Park was unavailable on the following Saturday afternoon.

The Association made a request to the League to play its Grand Final as a curtain raiser to the VFL Firsts Preliminary Final at the Melbourne Cricket Ground, but the League Seconds were not prepared to move to another venue; all of the suburban Association grounds were unavailable as they had already been topdressed for the cricket season; and, a proposal to play the match at Olympic Park on the Saturday night was abandoned because the floodlights were too dim.

As such, the match was moved to the only suitable venue remaining in Melbourne, the arena at the Royal Melbourne Showgrounds. The Showgrounds arena was not usually used football, and arrangements were decidedly makeshift: short goalposts, a faintly-marked boundary line, and inadequate dressing rooms.

Due to the remoteness of the location, and yet more inclement weather on the rescheduled day, an extremely meagre crowd of only 2,300 attended the match. As of 2025, this remains the lowest crowd for a VFA/VFL grand final ever.

In 1935, the Association abandoned its arrangement at Olympic Park entirely, and returned to playing finals at suburban Association grounds.

== Premiership ==
The home-and-home season was played over eighteen matches, a reduction from the twenty-two matches played in 1933, before the top four clubs contested a finals series under the Page–McIntyre system to determine the premiers for the season.

=== Ladder ===
1934 VFA ladder
Pos	Team	Pld	W	L	D	PF	PA	PP	Pts
1	Northcote (P)	18	14	4	0	1916	1387	138.1	56
2	Preston	18	14	4	0	1750	1377	127.1	56
3	Prahran	18	13	5	0	1966	1568	125.4	52
4	Coburg	18	11	6	1	1457	1422	102.5	46
5	Oakleigh	18	11	7	0	1659	1498	110.7	44
6	Yarraville	18	8	10	0	1542	1485	103.8	32
7	Camberwell	18	8	10	0	1487	1508	98.6	32
8	Sandringham	18	7	10	1	1570	1707	92.0	30
9	Brighton	18	7	10	1	1499	1739	86.2	30
10	Port Melbourne	18	6	12	0	1387	1618	85.7	24
11	Brunswick	18	5	13	0	1436	1806	79.5	20
12	Williamstown	18	2	15	1	1379	1933	71.3	10

Rules for classification: 1) points; 2) percentage; 3) number of points for.
(P) Premiers

=== Finals ===
	Semi-finals
Saturday, 8 September	Prahran 14.7 (91)	def. by	Coburg 14.11 (95)	Olympic Park (crowd: 5,000)
Saturday, 15 September	Northcote 15.13 (103)	def.	Preston 5.12 (42)	Olympic Park (crowd: 3,200)

	Preliminary Final
Saturday, 22 September	Preston 9.4 (58)	def. by	Coburg 8.14 (62)	Olympic Park (crowd: 4,000)

	Grand Final
Saturday, 29 September (postponed)	Northcote	v	Coburg	Olympic Park

1934 VFA Grand Final
Saturday, 6 October (2:50pm)	Northcote	def.	Coburg	Royal Melbourne Showgrounds Arena (crowd: 2,300)
4.5 (29); 10.10 (70); 17.12 (114); 19.16 (130)	Q1; Q2; Q3; Final	1.1 (7); 4.2 (26); 4.8 (32); 10.9 (69)	Umpires: Hassett
Seymour 6, Goullet 3, Gray 3, Ludlow 3, Ackland, Byrne, Clarke, Ross	Goals	Duncan 8, Brown, Nash
Ackland, for kicking Duncan; Haskett, for kicking Duncan	Reports

== Awards ==
- Frank Seymour (Northcote) was the leading goalkicker for the season; he kicked 122 goals in the home-and-home season and 130 goals overall. His tally broke his own record of 122 goals for the full season, set in 1932.
- In the two parallel Association best-and-fairest awards:
  - Danny Warr (Preston) won the Recorder Cup, polling five votes; Jim Dowling (Brunswick) and Edward Hyde (Prahran) finished equal second with four votes apiece.
  - Jim Dowling (Brunswick) won the Association Medal, polling 37 votes. G. Smith (Preston) was second with 23 votes and R. Williams (Camberwell) was third with 22 votes.
- Coburg won the seconds premiership after going through the season undefeated. Coburg 14.20 (104) defeated Brunswick 12.12 (84) in the Grand Final on Saturday 29 September at Heidelberg.
- Northcote became the permanent holder of the Grant Hay Shield for winning the premiership three seasons in a row. The Shield had been inaugurated as a semi-perpetual premiership trophy in 1932, to be presented permanently to the first club to win it three times; by virtue of its three premierships in a row, Northcote was the only team ever to win it.

== See also ==
- List of VFA/VFL Premiers
