= 1932 VFA season =

1932 VFA premiership season
- Teams: 12
- Premiers: Northcote; 2nd premiership
- Minor premiers: Northcote; 2nd minor premiership

The 1932 Victorian Football Association season was the 54th season of the Australian rules football competition. The premiership was won by the Northcote Football Club, after it defeated Coburg by 26 points in the final on 24 September. It was the club's second VFA premiership, and the first in a sequence of three premierships won consecutively from 1932 until 1934.

== Premiership ==
The home-and-home season was played over twenty matches, before the top four clubs contested a finals series under the amended Argus system to determine the premiers for the season.

=== Ladder ===
1932 VFA ladder
| Pos | Team | Pld | W | L | D | PF | PA | PP | Pts |
|---|---|---|---|---|---|---|---|---|---|
| 1 | Northcote (P) | 20 | 15 | 5 | 0 | 2110 | 1524 | 72.2 | 60 |
| 2 | Coburg | 20 | 15 | 5 | 0 | 1866 | 1416 | 75.9 | 60 |
| 3 | Camberwell | 20 | 14 | 6 | 0 | 1976 | 1548 | 78.3 | 56 |
| 4 | Preston | 20 | 14 | 6 | 0 | 1677 | 1548 | 92.3 | 56 |
| 5 | Port Melbourne | 20 | 12 | 8 | 0 | 1535 | 1488 | 96.9 | 48 |
| 6 | Sandringham | 20 | 12 | 8 | 0 | 1693 | 1617 | 95.5 | 48 |
| 7 | Brunswick | 20 | 9 | 10 | 1 | 1618 | 1746 | 107.9 | 38 |
| 8 | Williamstown | 20 | 9 | 11 | 0 | 1568 | 1611 | 102.7 | 36 |
| 9 | Prahran | 20 | 7 | 13 | 0 | 1643 | 1831 | 111.4 | 28 |
| 10 | Yarraville | 20 | 5 | 15 | 0 | 1577 | 1861 | 118.0 | 20 |
| 11 | Brighton | 20 | 4 | 15 | 1 | 1298 | 2033 | 156.6 | 18 |
| 12 | Oakleigh | 20 | 3 | 17 | 0 | 1417 | 1805 | 127.4 | 12 |

Rules for classification: 1) points; 2) percentage; 3) number of points for.
(P) Premiers

== Finals ==
=== Semi-finals ===
| | Semi-finals |
| Saturday, 10 September | Coburg 11.9 (75) | def. | Preston 8.20 (68) | Coburg Cricket Ground (crowd: 10,000) |
| Saturday, 17 September | Northcote 14.7 (91) | def. | Camberwell 12.15 (87) | Port Melbourne Cricket Ground (crowd: 7,000) |

=== Final ===
1932 VFA Final
Saturday, 24 September | Northcote | def. | Coburg | Coburg Cricket Ground (crowd: 9,000)
1.2 (8); 5.9 (39); 8.9 (57); 13.11 (89) | Q1; Q2; Q3; Final | 4.3 (27); 5.4 (34); 7.13 (55); 8.15 (63)
Seymour 8, Bray, Gray, Humphries, Ross, Rowe | Goals | Briggs 2, Elliott 2, Lowe 2, Mears 2,
Had Coburg won, minor premiers Northcote would have been entitled to a rematch the following Saturday to decide the premiership.

== Awards ==
- Frank Seymour (Northcote) was the leading goalkicker for the season, kicking 109 goals in the home-and-home season and 122 goals overall. Seymour's total set a new record for the most goals in a season, breaking his own record of 110 goals set in 1930.
- Bob Ross (Northcote) won the Recorder Cup as the Association's best and fairest, polling nine votes. Jim Jenkins (Coburg), H. Jones (Camberwell) and N. Driver (Oakleigh) tied for second with eight votes apiece.
- Brunswick won the seconds premiership. Brunswick 13.15 (93) defeated Coburg 4.13 (37) in the Grand Final at the Coburg Cricket Ground on 1 October.

== Notable events ==
- After winning back-to-back premierships in 1930 and 1931, many of Oakleigh's players either retired or transferred to the League, weakening Oakleigh's playing list so significantly that it won only three matches and received the 1932 wooden spoon.
- A new semi-perpetual trophy was presented to the Association by Grant Hay, to be presented each year to the premiers then won permanently by the first club to win it three times. Northcote, by winning the 1932, 1933 and 1934 premierships, became permanent holders of the trophy without any other club ever being presented it.

== See also ==
- List of VFA premiers
