= 1931 VFA season =

53rd Victorian Football Association season

1931 VFA premiership season
- Teams: 12
- Premiers: Oakleigh; 2nd premiership
- Minor premiers: Oakleigh; 2nd minor premiership

Attendance
- Matches played: 113
- Total attendance: 446,500 (3,951 per match)

The 1931 Victorian Football Association season was the 53rd season of the Australian rules football competition. The premiership was won by the Oakleigh Football Club, after it defeated Northcote by three points in the Grand Final on 26 September. It was the club's second VFA premiership, achieved in only its third season of senior competition, and it was Oakleigh's second premiership in a row.

== Premiership ==
After playing sectional games in 1930, the Association reverted to a simple season format, with each club playing eighteen home-and-home matches, before the top four clubs contested a finals series under the amended Argus system to determine the premiers for the season.

=== Ladder ===
1931 VFA ladder
Pos	Team	Pld	W	L	D	PF	PA	PP	Pts
1	Oakleigh (P)	18	14	4	0	1546	1047	67.7	56
2	Port Melbourne	18	14	4	0	1502	1089	72.5	56
3	Preston	18	12	5	1	1418	1273	89.8	50
4	Northcote	18	12	6	0	1620	1171	72.3	48
5	Yarraville	18	11	6	1	1386	1328	95.8	46
6	Coburg	18	11	7	0	1371	1342	97.9	44
7	Brunswick	18	9	9	0	1386	1236	89.2	36
8	Sandringham	18	8	10	0	1665	1796	107.9	32
9	Prahran	18	7	11	0	1283	1492	116.3	28
10	Williamstown	18	5	13	0	1209	1476	122.1	20
11	Brighton	18	2	16	0	1237	1798	145.4	8
12	Camberwell	18	2	16	0	1164	1734	149.0	8

Rules for classification: 1) points; 2) percentage; 3) number of points for.
(P) Premiers

=== Finals ===
	Semifinals
Saturday, 5 September	Port Melbourne 5.8 (38)	def. by	Northcote 9.11 (65)	Brunswick Cricket Ground (crowd: 9,000)
Saturday, 12 September	Oakleigh 6.8 (44)	def. by	Preston 9.13 (67)	Coburg Cricket Ground (crowd: 7,000)

	Final
Saturday, 19 September	Preston 7.9 (51)	def. by	Northcote 11.22 (88)	Coburg Cricket Ground (crowd: 10,000)

1931 VFA Grand Final
Saturday, 26 September	Oakleigh	def.	Northcote	Port Melbourne Cricket Ground (crowd: 10,000)
2.3 (15); 3.7 (25); 7.11 (53); 10.14 (74)	Q1; Q2; Q3; Final	2.1 (13); 4.3 (27); 9.3 (57); 11.5 (71)	Umpires: Stuart
Fraser 3, Rodwell 3, Maher 2, Crameri, Dolan	Goals	Simmonds 4, Seymour 3, Byrne 2, Corrigan, Ross
Injuries	Humphries (groin), Pruser (concussion)

== Awards ==
- Don Fraser, Sr. (Oakleigh) was the leading goalkicker for the season, kicking 77 goals in the home-and-home season and 83 goals overall.
- Bill Koop (Prahran) won the Recorder Cup as the Association's best and fairest, polling ten votes. Tom Lahiff (Port Melbourne) finished second with seven votes, and Doug Nicholls (Northcote) finished third with six votes.
- The seconds (Victorian Junior Football Association) premiership was won by Brunswick. Brunswick 12.10 (82) defeated Coburg 5.14 (44) in the Grand Final at Preston on 26 September to win the title.

== Notable events ==
- The Association and League re-established a permit agreement in 1931, meaning that players could not switch from one competition to the other without a clearance from his original competition. This was the first time a permit agreement had existed between the competitions since before the 1925 season.
- Following Coburg's 11-point victory against Port Melbourne on 30 May, Port Melbourne protested the result on the basis of a timekeeping error. The match was declared void, and in the replay on Wednesday 29 July, Coburg 11.15 (81) defeated Port Melbourne 8.17 (65) by 16 points.
- On 15 August, a combined Association team 16.11 (107) defeated a combined New South Wales League team 13.17 (95) by twelve points at the Sydney Cricket Ground, before a crowd of 8,608 spectators.
- Northcote lodged a protest against the result of the Grand Final, requesting the result be quashed a replay be held. Northcote contended that the Oakleigh timekeeper had rung the bell to signal the end of the third quarter approximately five seconds early, and had done so without the permission of the Northcote timekeeper; the ball was in Northcote's forward line at the time, although Oakleigh had possession. The Association found that there was a three to five second discrepancy between the two timekeepers' clocks, but could not say for sure whether the quarter had been played short or long, so it upheld Oakleigh's victory.

== See also ==
- List of VFA premiers

== Bibliography ==
Onlooker (5 September 1932). "Association – Northcote on top". The Argus. Melbourne. p. 12.
