= 1930 VFA season =

52nd season of the Victorian Football Association

Overview
- Teams: 12
- Premiers: Oakleigh; 1st premiership
- Minor premiers: Oakleigh; 1st minor premiership

The 1930 VFA season was the 52nd season of the Victorian Football Association (VFA), an Australian rules football competition played in the state of Victoria.

The premiership was won by the Oakleigh Football Club, after it defeated Northcote by nine points in the final on 27 September – a match which was notorious for several violent clashes instigated by Northcote players. It was the club's first VFA premiership, achieved in only its second season of senior competition.

== Premiership ==
In 1929, the Association had accommodated its expansion to twelve clubs by extending the home-and-home season to twenty-two games. In 1930, the Association opted to play its home-and-home season in two sections:

- All twelve teams played the first section of eighteen matches, with the unbalanced fixture seeing teams play some teams twice and others once.
- After eighteen matches, the bottom four teams were eliminated and the top eight played a further two home-and-home matches.
  - In the first week, first played second, third played fourth, fifth played sixth and seventh played eighth.
  - In the second week, the winners from the first week played against the other winners, and the losers from the first week played against the other losers.
  - If the teams had played each other only once, then the match was played at the home ground of the away team from the previous fixture; if they had played twice, the home venue was selected at random.
- Then, the top four clubs based on the results from all twenty matches contested a finals series under the amended Argus system to determine the premiers for the season.

The Association abandoned the practice of playing finals on different neutral Association grounds in 1930, and secured the North Melbourne Recreation Reserve, home of the League's North Melbourne Football Club, for all finals. The move was unpopular with the city councils of Port Melbourne, Brunswick and Coburg, which had spent a lot of money bringing their grounds up to the necessary standards for finals football, and attendances at North Melbourne were ultimately poor compared with previous seasons; so, in 1931 the Association reverted to staging finals at different Association venues. The incident was a prelude to the massive dispute between the Association and the councils which erupted in 1934 over the use of Olympic Park as a central ground.

=== Ladder ===
1930 VFA ladder
Pos	Team	Pld	W	L	D	PF	PA	PP	Pts
1	Oakleigh (P)	20	16	4	0	1846	1396	75.6	64
2	Northcote	20	15	5	0	1992	1383	69.4	60
3	Williamstown	20	13	7	0	1766	1549	87.7	52
4	Yarraville	20	12	8	0	1701	1474	86.7	48
5	Port Melbourne	20	10	9	1	1560	1557	99.8	42
6	Preston	20	10	9	1	1629	1672	102.6	42
7	Brighton	20	10	10	0	1792	1698	94.8	40
8	Coburg	20	9	9	2	1616	1544	95.5	40
9	Brunswick	18	7	11	0	1375	1521	110.6	28
10	Prahran	18	6	12	0	1345	1691	125.7	24
11	Camberwell	18	5	13	0	1345	1605	119.3	20
12	Sandringham	18	1	17	0	1386	2195	158.4	4

Rules for classification: 1) points; 2) percentage; 3) number of points for.
(P) Premiers

=== Finals ===
	Semifinals
Saturday, 13 September	Northcote 9.11 (65)	def.	Yarraville 5.11 (41)	North Melbourne Recreation Reserve (crowd: 7,000)
Saturday, 20 September	Oakleigh 11.10 (76)	def.	Williamstown 6.15 (51)	North Melbourne Recreation Reserve (crowd: 12,000)

=== 1930 VFA final ===
The final match, played in rainy conditions, was marred by a number of violent onfield incidents which culminated in a pitch invasion. Many players, mostly from Northcote, took an unduly rough approach to the match, and regularly kicked, punched and elbowed opponents. Nott of Oakleigh was kicked in the face in the second quarter, and fistfights broke out on the ground in the third quarter. In the final quarter, a Northcote player knocked out an Oakleigh opponent with his elbow; the trainers who came to the Oakleigh player's aid was punched by another Northcote player. This was the trigger for several hundred spectators to invade the field and engage in a melee, delaying the game by several minutes. Only two players were reported on the day, both Northcote players for incidents in the final quarter.

At the next general meeting in October, the Oakleigh club delegate told the Association that he believed almost the entire Northcote team should have been reported, and that it was the roughest game he had ever seen. Other delegates agreed that the on-field conduct of its players had disgraced the Northcote Football Club and the Association, and that it was one of the worst exhibitions of football they had seen; Oakleigh players were also lauded for their restraint during the match. Northcote president, Mr F. Traynor, agreed that his players' actions were unseemly, but told the Association that his players' motivation for the violence was in retribution to violence they had received from Oakleigh players in the clubs' previous match. Following an inquiry, the Association suspended Milne (Northcote) for the entire 1931 season; advised that it would not re-appoint any of the five match umpires (field umpire McKinnon, and the two goal umpires and boundary umpires) nor the seven members of the umpires' committee who were present at the match for the following season. Rowe (Northcote), Rudolph (Oakleigh) and some other club officials were also censured for their rough play.

1930 VFA Final
Saturday, 27 September	Oakleigh	def.	Northcote	North Melbourne Recreation Reserve (crowd: 8,000)
5.1 (31); 5.1 (31); 8.5 (53); 9.6 (60)	Q1; Q2; Q3; Final	1.1 (7); 5.4 (34); 6.5 (41); 7.9 (51)	Umpires: McKinnon
Fraser 4, Withers 2, Goding, Dolan, Opray	Goals	Seymour 3, Briggs 2, Brown, Stockdale
Goding (concussion), Nott (broken nose), Dolan (tooth), O'Neill (tooth), Wiltshire (torn leg muscle)	Injuries
Reports	Wilson, for elbowing Goding in the final quarter Milne, for unseemly conduct in the final quarter
Had Northcote won, minor premiers Oakleigh would have been entitled to a rematch the following Saturday to decide the premiership.

== Awards ==
- Frank Seymour (Northcote) was the leading goalkicker, with 102 goals in the home-and-home season and 110 goals overall. Seymour broke the record of 107 goals set in the 1912 VFA season by Dave McNamara (Essendon (A.)).
- E. Hyde (Port Melbourne) won the Recorder Cup as the Association's best and fairest, polling nine votes. W. Sykes (Williamstown) finished second with seven votes.
- Coburg won the seconds (Victorian Junior Football Association) premiership. Coburg 9.12 (66) defeated Preston 6.13 (49) in the Grand Final, played on 4 October at the North Melbourne Recreation Reserve.

== See also ==
- List of VFA/VFL premiers
