= Arthur Ludlow =

Australian rules footballer

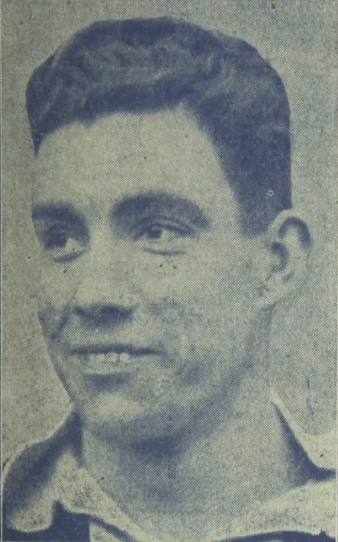

Personal information
- Full name: Arthur Edward Ludlow
- Born: 22 July 1906; Northcote, Victoria
- Died: 28 November 1968 (aged 62)
- Original team: Preston (VFA)
- Height: 185 cm (6 ft 1 in)
- Weight: 86 kg (190 lb)
- Position: Ruckman / Forward

Playing career^{1}
Years	Club	Games (Goals)
1928–1932	St Kilda	48 (58)

Representative team honours
Years	Team	Games (Goals)
1929	Victoria	2 (1)
- ^{1} Playing statistics correct to the end of 1932.

Career highlights
- Equal fifth – 1929 Brownlow Medal

Arthur Edward Ludlow (22 July 1906 – 28 November 1968) was an Australian rules footballer who played with St Kilda in the Victorian Football League (VFL).

== Biography ==
Ludlow was born in Northcote, Victoria on 22 July 1906.

=== Football ===
Ludlow played for Collingwood District before he joined Preston in the 1926 VFA season. A ruckman, he remained with Preston in the 1927 season, after which he was recruited by St Kilda.

Debuting for St Kilda in the opening round, Ludlow did not miss a game for his new club in 1928. He appeared in all 18 rounds and kicked 22 goals. His marking ability quickly earned praise and he was soon considered one of the best high marks in the competition.

In 1929 he played 16 games for St Kilda and twice represented Victoria at interstate football. On 8 June he was amongst Victoria's best players in their nine-point win over South Australia on the Melbourne Cricket Ground. He was then picked for the Victorian squad for a tour of Western Australia and South Australia. In Perth he played in the first of two fixtures, a 23-point win over the Western Australians. It was the first time Victoria had won in Perth over the home side. He missed the second fixture and the game in Adelaide with injury. St Kilda made the finals in 1929 and met Collingwood in a semi-final, but Ludlow missed selection as he was suffering from a "severe cold". He was St Kilda's joint top vote getter in the 1929 Brownlow Medal count, his three best on grounds were enough to finish equal fifth overall.

Ludlow came close to returning to Preston in 1930 but remained with St Kilda and started the season with four goals against Hawthorn in the opening round. During the season he suffered from the first serious injury of his VFL career, a damaged shoulder injury which kept him out for five weeks, after he had appeared in the first 11 rounds. He finished the season how it had begun, with another four-goal effort, in a win over Essendon in round 17.

In 1931 he left St Kilda to play in Sydney for the Newtown Australian Football Club. At Newtown he played with two of his brothers, Geof and Frank, both former Northcote players. Frank, also known as "Bill", had played VFL football for North Melbourne back in 1929. Newtown lost the 1931 premiership decider to Sydney by five points.

Ludlow transferred back to St Kilda for the 1932 VFL season and was straight back into the side for the opening round fixture against Richmond. A disappointing performance however saw him dropped to the league seconds and it would be his final VFL appearance for St Kilda.

=== Personal life ===
Ludlow worked as a petrol tank driver for Shell.

He was married to Ethel Gladys and lived in Cheltenham, Victoria in the later years of his life.
