= 1928 VFA season =

1928 VFA premiership season
- Teams: 10
- Premiers: Coburg; 3rd premiership
- Minor premiers: Coburg; 3rd minor premiership

The 1928 Victorian Football Association season was the 50th season of the Australian rules football competition. The premiership was won by the Coburg Football Club, after it defeated Port Melbourne by seven points in the final on 8 September. It was the club's third VFA premiership, achieved in only its fourth season of senior competition, and was the third in a sequence of three premierships won consecutively from 1926 until 1928.

== Association membership ==
After six seasons with limited on-field success, Geelong's supporter base had become very low, and its gate takings were unable to cover both running costs and the travel expenses of visiting teams. As such, the Association excluded Geelong from its senior ranks after the 1927 season, and sought applications from Melbourne-based replacements.

The Association elected to admit the Yarraville Football Club from the Victorian Junior Football Association into its senior ranks. Yarraville had been a leading junior club was located in a strong industrial area, and was expected to attract former fans of the nearby Footscray Football Club who had rejected the club after it joined the League in 1925. After being admitted, but prior to the season, Yarraville amalgamated with neighbouring club Kingsville, which was also a leading club in the V.J.F.A – Kingsville had beaten Yarraville in the 1927 V.J.F.A. section Grand Final. The other application to be seriously considered was from the Sandringham Council, which intended to establish a new senior club in its suburb, which was experiencing strong population growth at the time; but its attempts to join were ultimately hampered by the lack of a suitable home venue, after it was refused permission to fence the Beach Oval. The Kew Football Club from the V.J.F.A. was also considered.

The Victorian Junior Football Association, which had been affiliated with the V.F.A. since 1924, was reduced in size to ten teams, each of which was affiliated with a V.F.A. senior club and served as its second eighteen – and therefore effectively served for the first time as a dedicated Association seconds competition. It retained the V.J.F.A. name until 1932, when it formally became the V.F.A. second eighteens.

After having used the Motordrome for the previous three years, the Association staged each of its finals on different neutral Association ground.

== Premiership ==
The home-and-home season was played over eighteen rounds, with each club playing the others twice; then, the top four clubs contested a finals series under the amended Argus system to determine the premiers for the season.

=== Ladder ===
1928 VFA ladder
Pos	Team	Pld	W	L	D	PF	PA	PP	Pts
1	Coburg (P)	18	15	3	0	1742	1052	60.4	60
2	Port Melbourne	18	14	4	0	1500	1016	67.7	56
3	Brighton	18	12	6	0	1412	1246	88.2	48
4	Preston	18	11	7	0	1376	1104	80.2	44
5	Camberwell	18	11	7	0	1270	1189	93.6	44
6	Yarraville	18	10	8	0	1212	1233	101.7	40
7	Brunswick	18	8	10	0	1208	1249	103.4	36
8	Northcote	18	3	15	0	1167	1648	141.2	12
9	Williamstown	18	3	15	0	974	1491	153.1	12
10	Prahran	18	3	15	0	1099	1732	157.6	12

Rules for classification: 1) points; 2) percentage; 3) number of points for.
(P) Premiers

=== Finals ===
	Semifinals
Saturday, 25 August	Port Melbourne 9.15 (69)	def.	Preston 9.11 (65)	Coburg Cricket Ground (crowd: 12,000)
Saturday, 1 September	Coburg 11.16 (82)	def.	Brighton 12.7 (79)	Port Melbourne Cricket Ground (crowd: 8,000)

1928 VFA Final
Saturday, 8 September	Coburg	def.	Port Melbourne	Brunswick Cricket Ground (crowd: 10,854)
5.4 (34); 7.5 (47); 15.9 (99); 17.12 (114)	Q1; Q2; Q3; Final	3.4 (22); 10.7 (67); 12.9 (81); 16.11 (107)	Umpires: Murray
Plant 5, Stone 4, Colbert 3, Kerley 2, Gardiner, Huntington, Mears	Goals	McInnes 5, Kuhlken 4, Smith 2, Barnes, Bourke, Erridge, Hyde, Tuck
Had Port Melbourne won, minor premiers Coburg would have been entitled to a rematch the following Saturday to decide the premiership.

== Awards ==
- Frank Plant (Coburg) was the leading goalkicker, with 71 goals in the home-and-home season and 78 goals overall.
- Frank Smith (Prahran) won the Recorder Cup as the Association's best and fairest, polling seven votes. J. Lawn (Camberwell) was second with six votes; Frank Seymour (Northcote), Roy McKay (Williamstown), L. Carroll (Brighton) and H. Bridgierd (Preston) were all equal-third with four votes apiece.
- The Victorian Junior Football Association premiership, serving as the Association's seconds premiership, was won by Coburg. Coburg 4.5 (29) defeated Port Melbourne 1.9 (15) in the Grand Final on 15 September at the Coburg Cricket Ground.

== Notable events ==
- The two home-and-home matches were replayed during the season. On each occasion, a timekeeping error resulted in the match being played over less than the required duration:
  - In the opening round – and Yarraville's first ever senior game – Yarraville 10.12 (72) defeated Camberwell 8.17 (65). Camberwell protested that the timekeepers had called an end to the final quarter ten minutes early, so the result was nullified. The replay was held on Monday 4 June (King's Birthday holiday), and Yarraville 11.12 (78) defeated Camberwell 8.15 (63).
  - Then, on King's Birthday holiday, Brunswick 13.8 (86) defeated Brighton 8.16 (64). Brighton protested that the timekeepers had called an end to the second quarter ten minutes early, and this result was also nullified. The replay was held on Wednesday 18 July at the Melbourne Cricket Ground, in which Brunswick 10.15 (75) defeated Brighton 10.9 (69).
- John Aikman, who had served as Association president since 1903, died after a long illness on 29 July. He was formally replaced the following year by J. J. Liston, who was elected at the annual general meeting in February 1929.

== See also ==
- List of VFA premiers
