= Bill Hore =

Australian rules footballer

Personal information
- Full name: William Hore
- Born: 24 March 1890; St Kilda, Victoria
- Died: 15 September 1971 (aged 81); Hamilton, Victoria
- Original team: Northcote / Carlton District / Police
- Height: 178 cm (5 ft 10 in)
- Weight: 72 kg (159 lb)

Playing career^{1}
Years	Club	Games (Goals)
1913–14	St Kilda	4 (1)
1915–19	Carlton	15 (0)
1919	Melbourne	2 (0)
Total		21 (1)
- ^{1} Playing statistics correct to the end of 1919.

William Hore (24 March 1890 – 15 September 1971) was an Australian rules footballer who played with St Kilda, Carlton and Melbourne in the Victorian Football League (VFL).
