= Jack Lyngcoln =

Australian rules footballer, born 1910

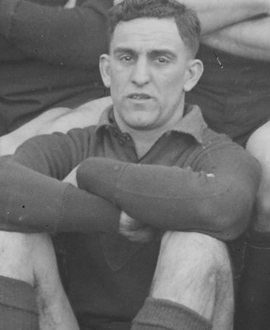
- Lyngcoln in 1932

Personal information
- Full name: John Charles Lyngcoln
- Born: 5 January 1910; Carlton, Victoria
- Died: 10 June 1990 (aged 80); Brisbane, Queensland
- Original team: North Fitzroy
- Height: 173 cm (5 ft 8 in)
- Weight: 70 kg (154 lb)

Playing career^{1}
Years	Club	Games (Goals)
1932	Collingwood	3 (0)
- ^{1} Playing statistics correct to the end of 1932.

John Charles Lyngcoln (5 January 1910 – 10 June 1990) was an Australian rules footballer who played with Collingwood in the Victorian Football League (VFL).

Lyngcoln appeared three times for Collingwood in the 1932 VFL season, in a strong team consisting of the Coventry brothers and Harry Collier. He later played at Northcote in the VFA and, with Alec Gray, joint coached them to the 1936 premiership.
