= Leigh Robertson =

Australian rules footballer (1950–2024)

Personal information
- Full name: Leigh Robertson
- Born: 21 May 1950
- Died: 23 December 2024 (aged 74)
- Original team: Olympic Youth Club
- Height: 182 cm (6 ft 0 in)
- Weight: 86 kg (190 lb)

Playing career
Years	Club	Games (Goals)
1969–74	Fitzroy	76 (14)

Leigh Robertson (21 May 1950 – 23 December 2024) was an Australian rules footballer who played with Fitzroy in the Victorian Football League (VFL). His brother Glenn and grandfather Tommy Corrigan both also played for Fitzroy.
