= Ernest Hart =

Ernest Hart may refer to:

- Ernest Hart (medical journalist) (1835–1898), English medical journalist
- Ernie Hart (1910–1985), American comic-book writer and artist
- Ernie Hart (Australian footballer) (1912–2001), Australian rules footballer
- Ernie Hart (footballer, born 1902) (1902–1954), English footballer
