= Vicki Cleary Day =

Annual Australian rules football match

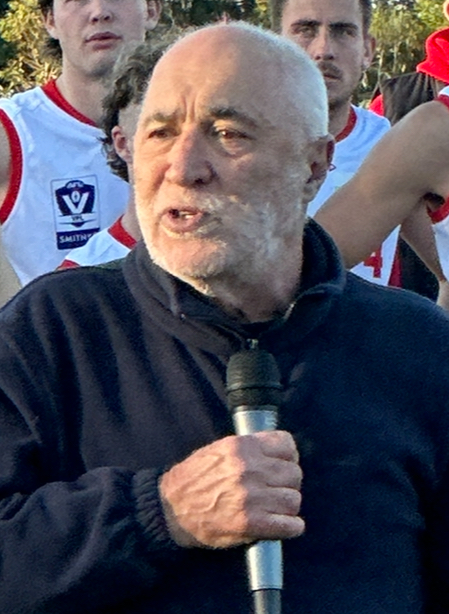
Phil Cleary

Vicki Cleary Day is an annual Australian rules football match in the Victorian Football League (VFL) hosted by the Coburg Football Club. The game is held in honour of Vicki Cleary, the sister of former Coburg captain and coach Phil Cleary, who was killed by her former partner in 1987.

The first match was held in 2017, and it has been held every year since (excluding 2020 and 2021 due to the COVID-19 pandemic) with Coburg competing against various other clubs.

== Background ==
On 26 August 1987, Vicki Cleary was attacked and repeatedly stabbed at a kindergarten by Peter Keogh, her former partner. She was 25 when she was killed.

Keogh was acquitted of murder and convicted of manslaughter by a jury, spending less than four years in jail. He committed suicide in 2001.

At the time his sister was killed, Phil Cleary was the captain-coach of Coburg in the Victorian Football Association (now Victorian Football League). He retired at the end of the 1987 season after playing 205 games. Cleary currently campaigns to stop male violence against women.

== Results ==
Year	Date	Rd	Home team	Score	Away team	Score	Ground	Winner	Margin
2017	30/4	3	Coburg	11.13 (79)	Northern Blues	21.15 (141)	Coburg City Oval	Northern Blues	62
2018	19/5	7	Coburg	7.5 (47)	Collingwood	10.12 (72)	Coburg City Oval	Collingwood	25
2019	21/7	16	Coburg	15.12 (102)	North Melbourne	16.9 (105)	Preston City Oval	North Melbourne	3
2022	19/6	13	Coburg	7.10 (52)	Richmond	15.14 (104)	Piranha Park	Richmond	52
2023	13/5	8	Coburg	12.8 (80)	Northern Bullants	12.15 (87)	Piranha Park	Northern Bullants	7
2024	21/7	17	Coburg	11.9 (75)	Port Melbourne	10.10 (70)	Piranha Park	Coburg	5

== See also ==
- Battle of Bell Street
