= Mopsy Fraser =

Australian rules footballer

Don Fraser Jr.

Personal information
- Full name: Donald William James Fraser
- Born: 24 October 1922; Collingwood, Victoria
- Died: 26 June 1987 (aged 64); Adelaide
- Original team: Richmond Districts
- Height: 183 cm (6 ft 0 in)
- Weight: 86.5 kg (191 lb)

Playing career^{1}
| Years | Club | Games (Goals) |
| 1945–1952 | Richmond | 124 (125) |
- ^{1} Playing statistics correct to the end of 1952.

Career highlights
- VFL Representative Games:- 9; VFA Representative Games:- 1; Tasmanian Representative Games:- 1

Donald William James "Mopsy" Fraser (24 October 1922 – 26 June 1987) was an Australian rules footballer who played in the VFL between 1945 and 1952 for the Richmond Football Club.

== Family ==
The son of Donald James Benjamin Fraser, and Lilian Rose Fraser, née Haig, Donald William James Fraser was born in Collingwood, Victoria on 24 October 1922.

His father (also "Don Fraser"), was an Australian rules footballer in the 1920s and 1930s, who twice won the leading goalkicker award while playing for Oakleigh, and also played 18 games for Richmond.

== Football ==
Known as "Mopsy", he is still regarded as one of the most rugged players ever to play in the Victorian Football League (VFL), serving a total 16 weeks in suspensions whilst at the Tigers.

He then played in the Victorian Football Association (VFA), serving as captain-coach of the Port Melbourne Football Club, leading the club to the 1953 premiership, and then later serving as captain-coach at Prahran. He was suspended for a further 30 matches in the VFA, missing out on finals series with Port Melbourne in 1954 and 1955, and while at Prahran was suspended for the last fifteen weeks of the 1957 season for a dangerous sling tackle on an opponent, following by using abusive language towards the umpires.

== See also ==
- 1950 Brisbane Carnival
