= Tommy Corrigan =

Australian rules footballer (1903–1943)

Personal information
- Full name: Thomas Joseph Corrigan
- Born: 24 February 1903; North Melbourne, Victoria
- Died: 9 January 1943 (aged 39); Heidelberg, Victoria
- Original team: Fitzroy Churches
- Debut: 6 May 1922, Fitzroy vs. St Kilda, at Junction Oval
- Height: 178 cm (5 ft 10 in)
- Weight: 76 kg (168 lb)

Playing career^{1}
Years	Club	Games (Goals)
1922–1928	Fitzroy	107 (13)
- ^{1} Playing statistics correct to the end of 1928.

Thomas Joseph Corrigan (24 February 1903 – 9 January 1943) was an Australian rules footballer who played for Fitzroy in the Victorian Football League (VFL), and Nothcote in the VFA during the 1920s and 1930s. He died of peritonitis that had been mis-diagnosed as influenza by a RAAF doctor whilst serving in the RAAF during the Second World War.

== Family ==
The son of Thomas Joseph Corrigan, a barber, and Amelia Louisa "Millie" Corrigan (1881–1953), née McIntosh, he was born in North Melbourne on 24 February 1903; a younger brother, Don, was born two years later. His mother was protective of her children, and his father was a difficult man. After his father's death (c.1909), his mother went into business for herself, and supported herself and her children running a "shoe uppers factory".

He attended a local school, and displayed early talent at both cricket and football.

He married Alice Grimshaw (1907–1981). They had one child, a daughter, Betty (b.1932). Betty married Bill Robertson, and both her sons, Tom's grandsons, Leigh Robertson (born 21 May 1950) and Glenn Robertson (born 1 November 1952) played for Fitzroy. Leigh played 76 senior games from 1969 to 1974, and Glenn played 50 senior games from 1972 to 1976.

== Football ==
He played football at school, and then for various district junior sides.

=== Fitzroy ===
Having played well in both of Fitzroy's pre-season practice matches, Corrigan (aged 19) was selected to play in the centre, against St Kilda, in the first round match at the Junction Oval on 6 May 1922. In his first season, he played in twelve of the sixteen senior home-and-away matches, four matches against West Australian teams on Fitzroy's West Australian tour in August 1922, and in three finals, including Fitzroy's 1922 premiership side.

He was Fitzroy's first-choice centre man for his entire career.

He played 16 senior games in 1923, including the Grand Final against Essendon (postponed until 18 October 1923 because of the condition of the MCG), which Fitzroy lost by 17 points. He played 17 senior games in 1924, including three "round robin" final games, 17 senior games in 1925 (he received one best on the ground vote in the 1925 Brownlow medal), 16 senior games in 1926, 15 senior games in 1927, and 11 games in 1928, his final season with Fitzroy.

Because he was injured during his last match for Fitzroy, playing in the centre, in Fitzroy's 16.9 (105) to 12.9 (81) victory over Geelong, at the Brunswick Street Oval, on 18 August 1928 (he split the web between two of the fingers in his left hand, and had badly bruised kidneys from being kneed in the back by Geelong ruckman Garnet Lamb, and was forced to leave the field before the end of the match) he was unable to play the last match of the 1928 season against South Melbourne a week later.

=== Northcote ===
He left Fitzroy after the 1928 season and went on to play with Northcote.

He played for Northcote for five seasons. He missed Northcote's 1929 Grand-Final victory, due to a leg injury. However, he did play in Northcote's two Grand-Final losses against Oakleigh in 1930 and 1931, and in Northcote's to grand-Final Victories in 1932 and 1933 against Coburg.

He played his last senior match for Northcote, playing in the centre, against Coburg, on Saturday 7 October 1933, in the Grand-Final. Northcote won 11.20 (86) to 9.16 (70), with Corrigan one of Northcote's best players; and, immediately the match was over, he announced his retirement.

It was a very tight, tough, and spiteful match, particularly in the last quarter where many players completely lost control of themselves, with much ankle-kicking as players passed one another, and many punches thrown in retaliation; all in all, fourteen charges were laid against eight players, including Corrigan and George Rudolph of Coburg, who were reported for striking each other in the last quarter by field-umpire McKinnon.

At the tribunal hearing on 17 October 1933, Corrigan was suspended for six matches.

On 20 June 1934, Corrigan was granted re-registration with Northcote by the VFA Permit and Umpire Committee. There is no record of Corrigan playing any further senior games for Northcote; so, it would seem that Corrigan's re-registration was far more to do with him regaining his lost reputation, than with any desire on his part to continue playing.

== After football ==
In the 1920s, after leaving school, Corrigan had attended a secretarial college and studied shorthand and typing (Main and Allen (2002), p. 229). In 1934, once his football career was over, he found employment as the Registrar of Public Assistance with the Northcote City Council (at his enlistment he described himself as "Officer for Sustenance for the City of Northcote"). He was renowned for his kindness and compassion for the poor and the unemployed, in the midst of the depression, in one of the most badly affected areas of Melbourne. He was still working in this position when he enlisted in the RAAF.

== Airman ==
He enlisted in the RAAF on 16 Jun 1941, and served as a Sergeant in the R.A.A.F during World War II, at 1 Recruit Centre, Russell Street, Melbourne. Even though he was mainly based in Melbourne, he had flown with the RAAF to New Guinea on a number of occasions; this qualified as overseas service, which made his widow, Alice, eligible for a War Widow's pension.

== Death ==
Still a robustly fit man, he died at the Heidelberg Repatriation Hospital, under extremely controversial circumstances, whilst on active service in Melbourne on 9 January 1943. In early January 1943, he was unwell, and he reported to the RAAF doctor who misdiagnosed influenza; finally, a week later, on 9 January 1943, when he was so ill that he could not get out of bed, his wife called in their family doctor, who immediately called an ambulance. The ambulance officers (astonishingly) demanded that he walk from his bed to the ambulance. He died within 30 minutes of his admission to the military hospital: of peritonitis caused by a burst appendix. A subsequent official RAAF court of inquiry into the circumstances of his death, laid the blame for his death on the RAAF doctor's misdiagnosis (see Main, J. & Allen, 2002, pp. 227–229 passim).

After a funeral with full military honours, attended by many famous footballers, he was buried at the Springvale War Cemetery, Melbourne, Victoria, on Tuesday 12 January 1943 (his Northcote teammate Pastor Doug Nicholls, who attended, was not allowed to give a eulogy, because it was a military funeral).

== See also ==
- List of Victorian Football League players who died on active service
