= Bill Downie =

Australian rules footballer (1909–1943)

Personal information
- Born: 3 December 1909; Raywood, Victoria
- Died: 11 September 1943 (aged 34); Burma-Siam Railway, Burma
- Original team: Eaglehawk
- Height: 184 cm (6 ft 0 in)
- Weight: 81 kg (179 lb)

Playing career^{1}
Years	Club	Games (Goals)
1929–1932	Footscray (VFL)	54 (26)
1933	St Kilda (VFL)	15 (2)
1934-1935	Deniliquin (EFL)	
1936–1939	Northcote (VFA)	64 (97)
Total		133 (125)

Coaching career
Years	Club	Games (W–L–D)
1934-1935	Deniliquin (EFL)	
- ^{1} Playing statistics correct to the end of 1939.

Career highlights
- Captain-coach of the EFL premiership team Deniliquin in 1934 and 1935

William Downie (3 December 1909 – 11 September 1943) was an Australian rules footballer who played with Footscray and St Kilda in the Victorian Football League (VFL).

== Family ==
The son of Thomas Michael Downie (1862-1919), and Elizabeth Downie (1866-1931), née Webster, William Sheppard Downie was born at Raywood, Victoria on 3 December 1909. He married Margaret Maud Gibson (1902-1986), a nurse at the Deniliquin Hospital, in Melbourne, on 3 November 1934. They had three children.

== Football ==
He played as a ruckman.

=== Footscray (VFL) ===
Recruited from Eaglehawk, Downie and made his VFL debut against North Melbourne at the Western Oval, on 11 May 1929. During the match against Carlton, at Princes Park, on 13 July 1929 Downie was reported for (a) elbowing Carlton's Ansell Clarke, and (b) "unseemly conduct" for the gestures he made responding to a spectator's heckling. The VFL Tribunal met on 18 July 1925, and found him guilty on both charges. He was suspended for eight weeks for elbowing Clarke; and, although found guilty, was only "reprimanded" on the charge of unseemly conduct, rather than receiving an additional suspension. He went on to play 54 games for Footscray over four seasons (1929-1932).

=== St Kilda (VFL) ===
Cleared from Footscray to St Kilda in April 1933, he played in 15 senior games for St Kilda during the 1933 season, including one (against North Melbourne, at the Junction Oval, on 27 May 1933) within which he continued to play on despite suffering a broken thumb.

=== Deniliquin (EFL) ===
Downie was captain-coach of the Deniliquin Football Club in the Echuca Football League in 1934 and 1935. Deniliquin won the Echuca Football League premiership in both years: 1934, and 1935.

=== Northcote (VFA) ===
In May 1936, he was cleared from Deniliquin back to St Kilda, and, then, from St Kilda to Northcote in the Victorian Football Association (VFA). He went on to play in 64 matches for Northcote over 4 seasons (1936—1939). He was a member of Northcote's 1936 VFA premiership side. In 1938, Downie won both Northcote's best and fairest award, and the VFA's best and fairest award, the Recorder Cup.

On Saturday, 29th May 1938, playing at centre half forward, Downie kicked 12 goals, 8 behinds for Northcote against Coburg.

== Military service ==
He served with the 2/105 General Transport Company, in the Second Australian Imperial Force, in World War II. He was captured in Java in 1942; and, as a prisoner of war, he worked on the Burma Railway.

== Death ==
He died of illness ("tropical ulcers") on 11 September 1943 whilst working on the Burma Railway, and his remains were (later) transferred to the Thanbyuzayat War Cemetery in 1946.

== See also ==
- List of Victorian Football League players who died on active service
- VFA - Recorder Cup
