= Rivalries in the Victorian Football League =

Rivalries in the Victorian Football League (VFL) exist between many teams. The competition was founded in 1877 as the Victorian Football Association (VFA), and as of 2025, several rivalries have been ongoing for more than 100 seasons.

An official VFL Rivalry Round was held in 2008 alongside the same themed round in the Australian Football League (AFL).

== Victorian rivalries ==
=== Port Melbourne v Williamstown ===
The rivalry between Port Melbourne and Williamstown has existed since 1886, making it the oldest in the VFL and possibly the oldest in Australian rules football.

In the 1950s, Port Melbourne played in eight grand finals (winning the premiership in 1953), while Williamstown won the grand finals in 1954, 1955 and 1956, defeating Port Melbourne in all three matches. Williamstown also won the VFA premiership in 1958 and 1959. The clubs also played each other in the 2011 VFL Grand Final, with Port Melbourne winning by 56 points.

=== Port Melbourne v Sandringham ===
Port Melbourne and Sandringham are considered some of the strongest VFA/VFL clubs, and were the only two teams to never be relegated to Division 2 of the VFA between 1961 and 1988. The clubs played against each other in grand finals in 1947, 1977 and 2004.

=== Coburg v Northern Bullants ===
The Coburg Football Club and the Northern Bullants (formerly known as Preston) are closely located, with their respective home grounds of Coburg City Oval and Preston City Oval divided by Bell Street in Preston, giving the rivalry the name of the "Battle of Bell Street".

== Non-Victorian rivalries ==
Although the VFL has predominantly featured clubs from the state of Victoria, the competition has included some non-Victorian clubs, including several from New South Wales and Queensland that joined after the North East Australian Football League (NEAFL) merged with the VFL ahead of the 2021 season.

=== Gold Coast v Southport ===
Gold Coast and Southport are both based on the Gold Coast in Queensland, and have played matches against each other since the 2011 NEAFL season, with the rivalry known as the "Coast Clash". The clubs met in a preliminary final in 2022, with Southport winning and proceeding into the grand final (which it lost to Casey the following week).

== Former rivalries ==
=== Brunswick v Coburg ===
Brunswick (which folded in 1991) and Coburg had a rivalry as two clubs based in Melbourne's northern suburbs, playing each other 104 times between 1925 and 1990.
