= Ian McOrist =

Australian rules footballer, born 1949

Personal information
- Born: 6 November 1949 (age 76)
- Original team: Northcote (VFA)

Playing career^{1}
Years	Club	Games (Goals)
1972	Collingwood	12 (16)
- ^{1} Playing statistics correct to the end of 1972.

Ian McOrist (born 6 November 1949) is a former Australian rules footballer who played in the Victorian Football League (VFL).

McOrist was recruited from Northcote, where he finished third for the J. J. Field Trophy (Victorian Football Association Division 2 Best & Fairest) in 1971. He was a half-forward flanker who played one year of senior football at Collingwood in 1972; he played only 12 games, for 16 goals under coach Neil Mann, including six goals in his first full match, after being a reserve in his first match.
