= 1927 VFA season =

1927 VFA premiership season
- Teams: 10
- Premiers: Coburg; 2nd premiership
- Minor premiers: Coburg; 2nd minor premiership

Attendance
- Matches played: 96
- Total attendance: 386,000 (4,021 per match)

The 1927 Victorian Football Association season was the 49th season of the Australian rules football competition. The premiership was won by the Coburg Football Club, after it defeated Brighton by 34 points in the Grand Final on 15 October. It was the club's second VFA premiership, achieved in only its third season of senior competition, and was the second in a sequence of three premierships won consecutively from 1926 until 1928; and, it came after the team was undefeated in the home-and-home season.

== Association membership ==
In the off-season, the Brunswick Football Club was re-admitted to the association, after having withdrawn from the competition in late 1926 in protest at suspensions given to two of its players. As such, the association membership remained the same as it had been at the start of 1926.

== Premiership ==
The home-and-home season was played over eighteen rounds, with each club playing the others twice; then, the top four clubs contested a finals series under the amended Argus system to determine the premiers for the season.

=== Ladder ===
1927 VFA ladder
Pos	Team	Pld	W	L	D	PF	PA	PP	Pts
1	Coburg (P)	18	18	0	0	2005	1051	52.4	72
2	Brighton	18	14	4	0	1454	1100	75.7	58 (Note: 2 bonus points)
3	Port Melbourne	18	13	5	0	1394	1012	72.6	52
4	Preston	18	12	6	0	1587	1323	83.4	48
5	Northcote	18	11	7	0	1378	1205	87.4	44
6	Williamstown	18	7	10	1	1013	1289	127.2	30
7	Brunswick	18	6	12	0	1037	1330	128.3	24
8	Camberwell	18	5	13	0	1261	1552	123.1	20
9	Prahran	18	2	15	1	1133	1665	147.0	10
10	Geelong	18	1	17	0	889	1623	182.6	4

Rules for classification: 1) points; 2) percentage; 3) number of points for.
(P) Premiers

=== Finals ===
	Semifinals
Saturday, 3 September	Brighton 8.14 (62)	drew with	Preston 7.20 (62)	Motordrome (crowd: 6,000)
Saturday, 10 September	Coburg 15.10 (100)	drew with	Port Melbourne 15.10 (100)	Motordrome (crowd: 10,000)
Saturday, 17 September	Brighton 12.13 (85)	def.	Preston 9.17 (71)	Motordrome (crowd: 10,000)
Saturday, 24 September	Coburg 7.6 (48)	def. by	Port Melbourne 14.13 (97)	Motordrome (crowd: 13,000)

	Preliminary final
Saturday, 1 October (postponed)	Brighton	v	Port Melbourne	Motordrome (crowd: 2,000)
Saturday, 8 October	Brighton 11.14 (80)	def.	Port Melbourne 9.15 (69)	Motordrome (crowd: 23,000)

1927 VFA Grand Final
Saturday, 15 October	Coburg	def.	Brighton	Motordrome (crowd: 20,000)
5.1 (31); 9.3 (57); 13.6 (84); 19.10 (124)	Q1; Q2; Q3; Final	1.4 (10); 6.6 (42); 10.7 (67); 13.12 (90)
Gardiner 10, Forbes 3, Kerley 2, Charleston, Harris, Huntington, Rogers	Goals	Walsh 7, Hunt 2, De Aurugo 2, Arthur, May
Injuries	Irwin (broken leg), Garcia (thigh), Dainty (leg), De Aurugo (leg)

== Awards ==
- P. Gardiner (Coburg) was the leading goalkicker for the season, with 82 goals in the home-and-home matches and 97 overall. He finished ahead of J. Walsh (Brighton), who kicked 78 goals in the home-and-home matches and 92 goals overall.
- Ernie Martin (Coburg) won the Recorder Cup as the best and fairest player in the association for the season. Woods (Northcote) finished second.

== Notable events ==
- Prior to this season, Brighton moved its home ground from the Brighton Beach Oval in southern Brighton to Elsternwick Park in northern Brighton.
- Due to errors by the scoreboard attendants in the drawn semi-final between Brighton and Preston, those present at the ground were unsure of the result of the game until the goal umpires confirmed the score after the final bell.
- The preliminary final was postponed by one week because extremely heavy rain on the day made the surface unplayable. The rain was so heavy that the League Grand Final, which was played that day in spite of the rain, was the lowest scoring League match of the 20th century.
- Because of the two drawn semi-finals and the postponed preliminary final, the finals series was spread over a total of seven weekends.

== See also ==
- List of VFA premiers
