= Jack Gervasoni =

Australian rules footballer and coach

Personal information
- Full name: John Hogan Gervasoni
- Born: 29 September 1929; Daylesford, Victoria
- Died: 9 February 1992 (aged 62); Kew, Victoria
- Original teams: Daylesford, Ballarat (BFL)

Playing career^{1}
| Years | Club | Games (Goals) |
| 1951–1956 | Fitzroy | 89 (86) |

Coaching career
| Years | Club | Games (W–L–D) |
| 1957–1958 | Northcote (VFA) | 38 (6–32–0) |
- ^{1} Playing statistics correct to the end of 1956.

John Hogan 'Jack' Gervasoni (29 September 1929 – 9 February 1992) was an Australian rules footballer who played for Fitzroy in the Victorian Football League (VFL) and captain-coached Northcote in the Victorian Football Association (VFA).

He was educated at St Michael's Primary School and Presentation Convent Daylesford (now Convent Gallery) before attending Ballarat Teachers' College (now the Federation University).

Originally playing for Daylesford Football Club, Gervasoni was recruited from Ballarat and played as a rover for Fitzroy in the VFL from 1951 to 1956. He was then captain-coach of Northcote in the VFA for two years.

Gervasoni was also known for his community work. He was elected to the Kew City Council in 1971 and served as mayor in 1978. He was a trustee of the Yarra Bend Park and president of many local organisations. The changerooms at Kew's Willsmere Park were named after him.

Gervasoni taught and coached sports at Burke Hall (Xavier College Preparatory School) where an oval was named in his honour following his death in 1992.

Two of Gervasoni's children followed him into education, Ann Gervasoni and Clare Gervasoni.
