= Frank Plant (footballer) =

Australian rules footballer

Personal information
- Full name: Michael Francis Plant
- Born: 14 September 1900; Mosman, New South Wales
- Died: 8 September 1976 (aged 75); Parkville, Victoria
- Original team: Wonthaggi
- Height: 182 cm (6 ft 0 in)
- Weight: 68 kg (150 lb)

Playing career^{1}
Years	Club	Games (Goals)
1922	Collingwood	1 (0)
- ^{1} Playing statistics correct to the end of 1922.

Michael Francis Plant (14 September 1900 – 8 September 1976) was an Australian rules footballer who played with Collingwood in the Victorian Football League (VFL) and Coburg in the Victorian Football Association.

Plant was a key forward for Coburg during the club's dominant era in the late 1920s. Plant played for Coburg from 1924 until 1931, playing a total of 93 games and kicking 354 goals. He finished as the VFA's leading goalkicker in 1928 with 78 goals, as well as finishing third in the association with tallies of 81 goals in 1927 and 74 goals in 1929, and was a member of Coburg's 1926, 1927 and 1928 premiership teams. He was inducted into the club's hall of fame in 2017.
