= Glenn Robertson (footballer) =

Australian rules footballer (born 1952)

Personal information
- Full name: Glenn Robertson
- Born: 1 November 1952 (age 74)
- Original team: Olympic Youth Club
- Height: 185 cm (6 ft 1 in)
- Weight: 81 kg (179 lb)

Playing career^{1}
Years	Club	Games (Goals)
1972–76	Fitzroy	50 (13)
- ^{1} Playing statistics correct to the end of 1976.

Glenn Robertson (born 1 November 1952) is a former Australian rules footballer who played with Fitzroy in the Victorian Football League (VFL). and with East Perth Football Club in the WAFL playing 98 games and a Premiership in 1978. On returning to Melbourne, he played 67 games with Port Melbourne in the VFA where he played in their 1982 premiership team. Won the club's Best and Fairest in 1983, and later captained them in 1985. He was Vice Captain of the VFA representative side in 1983 and 1984.

In commercial life, Robertson worked for 23 years with Cadbury/Schweppes Aust and after a brief stint as State Manager for Cadbury in S.A. in 1986/7 became National Sales Director of the Cadbury confectionery division in 1988. He held that role for 5 years and was then recruited to the Schweppes Cottee's division in 1992 as National Sales Director for Schweppes.

He was recruited to Ansett Australia first as National Sales Director, in 1995 and was then appointed to the role of General Manager - Olympics, managing that company's multimillion-dollar exclusive airline sponsorship of the Sydney 2000 Olympic Games.

He was appointed to the inaugural Board of Football Victoria during this time where he served for three years.
