= Bill Koop =

Australian rules footballer, born 1906

Personal information
- Full name: William Spehr Koop
- Born: 21 March 1906; Dimboola, Victoria
- Died: 14 April 1950 (aged 44); Oakleigh, Victoria
- Original team: Dimboola
- Height: 179 cm (5 ft 10 in)
- Weight: 85 kg (187 lb)
- Position: Key position defender

Playing career^{1}
| Years | Club | Games (Goals) |
| 1925–26, 1928 | Carlton | 20 (11) |
- ^{1} Playing statistics correct to the end of 1928.

William Spehr Koop (21 March 1906 – 14 April 1950) was an Australian rules footballer who played for Carlton in the Victorian Football League (VFL) during the 1920s.

Koop did not make much of an impact at Carlton in his first three seasons and left Carlton in 1927 to coach Culcairn Football Club, NSW, before returning to Carlton in 1928. Koop played in two VFL Reserves premierships with Carlton in 1926 and 1928.

Koop then had a successful career in the Victorian Football Association as a key position defender, he was a centre half-back in Northcote's 1929 premiership team. He was appointed as captain / coach of Prahran in January, 1931, but had to resign in March, 1931 at the request of the Police Commissioner. Koop then enjoyed some individual success at Prahran, winning the 1931 Recorder Cup. Koop was also a premiership player with Prahran in 1937.

The 146 game Prahran veteran was named, in 2003, on the interchange bench in their official 'Team of the Century'.
