= Percy Rowe =

Australian rules footballer and coach

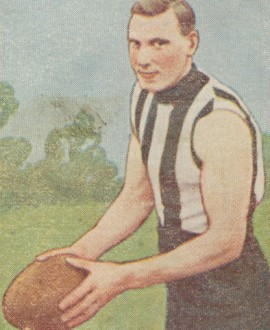
- Rowe in 1922

Personal information
- Full name: Percival Henry Rowe
- Born: 4 January 1896; Rutherglen, Victoria
- Died: 27 August 1976 (aged 80); Armadale, Victoria
- Original teams: Lake Rovers, Rutherglen
- Height: 183 cm (6 ft 0 in)
- Weight: 87 kg (192 lb)

Playing career^{1}
Years	Club	Games (Goals)
1920–1923 & 1927-1928	Collingwood	96 (37)

Coaching career
Years	Club	Games (W–L–D)
1929–1934	Northcote	136 (100–33–3)
1935	Fitzroy	18 (8–9–1)
1937	Carlton	18 (11–7–0)
1945–1946	Coburg	42 (33–9–0)
- ^{1} Playing statistics correct to the end of 1946.

Percival Henry Rowe (4 January 1896 – 27 August 1976) was a player and coach in the Victorian Football League (VFL) and Victorian Football Association (VFA).

Rowe initially played for Christmastown in the Chiltern & District Football Association, then in 1915, he played for Lake Rovers Football Club in the Ovens and Murray Football League grand final when Rutherglen defeated Lake Rovers.

In 1924 Rowe coached the Albury Football Club.

Rowe coached the Wangaratta Football Club to the 1925 Ovens and Murray Football League premiership. Wangaratta Football Club were runner-up to St. Patrick's Football Club in 1926 under his coaching.

He then returned to Collingwood Football Club and played in their 1927 and 1928 VFL premierships.

Rowe is most notable for his time as captain-coach of the Northcote Football Club, where he oversaw the most successful period in the club's history. He played and coached at Northcote from 1929 until 1933, winning three premierships (1929, 1932 and 1933) and finishing runners-up twice (1930–31) in those five seasons. Ralph Goullet, took over as captain-coach of Northcote and lead them to a premiership in 1934.

After leaving Northcote, Rowe was the coach of the Fitzroy Football Club in 1935 and the Carlton Football Club for the 1937 season before he was replaced by captain-coach Brighton Diggins. He is the father of Des Rowe, who captained Richmond.
