= Don Fraser Sr. =

Australian rules footballer, born 1901

Personal information
- Full name: Donald James Benjamin Fraser
- Born: 25 October 1901; Richmond, Victoria
- Died: 7 November 1978 (aged 77); Malvern East, Victoria
- Original team: Yarra Park School/Eltham Juniors/Richmond City
- Height: 173 cm (5 ft 8 in)
- Weight: 67 kg (148 lb)

Playing career^{1}
Years	Club	Games (Goals)
1923, 1925	Richmond	18 (25)
- ^{1} Playing statistics correct to the end of 1925.

Career highlights
- Richmond Leading Goalkicker 1923

Donald James Benjamin Fraser (25 October 1901 – 7 November 1978) was an Australian rules footballer who was a noted goalkicker for the Oakleigh Football Club in the Victorian Football Association in the 1920s and 1930s. He also played in the VFL for two seasons the Richmond Football Club.

He went on to play in premiership sides for suburban team Fairfield in 1926 and 1928 and for Oakleigh in the VFA in 1930 and 1931.

From 1922, when he commenced playing for Richmond's seconds, to 1935, when he played his final season for Oakleigh, Fraser kicked 949 goals from his 254 games. He twice won competition goalkicking awards and led his club goalkicking for ten seasons.

His son, "Mopsy" Fraser, played 124 games for Richmond in the late 1940s and early 1950s.
