= Ernie Hart (Australian footballer) =

Australian rules footballer (1912–2001)

Personal information
- Full name: Ernie Hart
- Born: 4 June 1912
- Died: 7 September 2001 (aged 89)
- Original team: Northcote
- Height: 178 cm (5 ft 10 in)
- Weight: 76 kg (168 lb)

Playing career^{1}
Years	Club	Games (Goals)
1943	Melbourne	1 (0)
- ^{1} Playing statistics correct to the end of 1943.

Ernie Hart (4 June 1912 – 7 September 2001) was an Australian rules footballer who played with Melbourne in the Victorian Football League (VFL).

Hart played his only senior game for Melbourne a day after his 31st birthday, against Richmond at Punt Road Oval. He instead spent most of him time in the seconds and won the Gardiner Medal in 1943.

Before coming to the VFL, Hart played his football for Northcote and was joint coach with Jack Lyngcoln in 1937.
