= 1932 VFL season =

36th season of the Victorian Football League (VFL)

1932 VFL premiership season
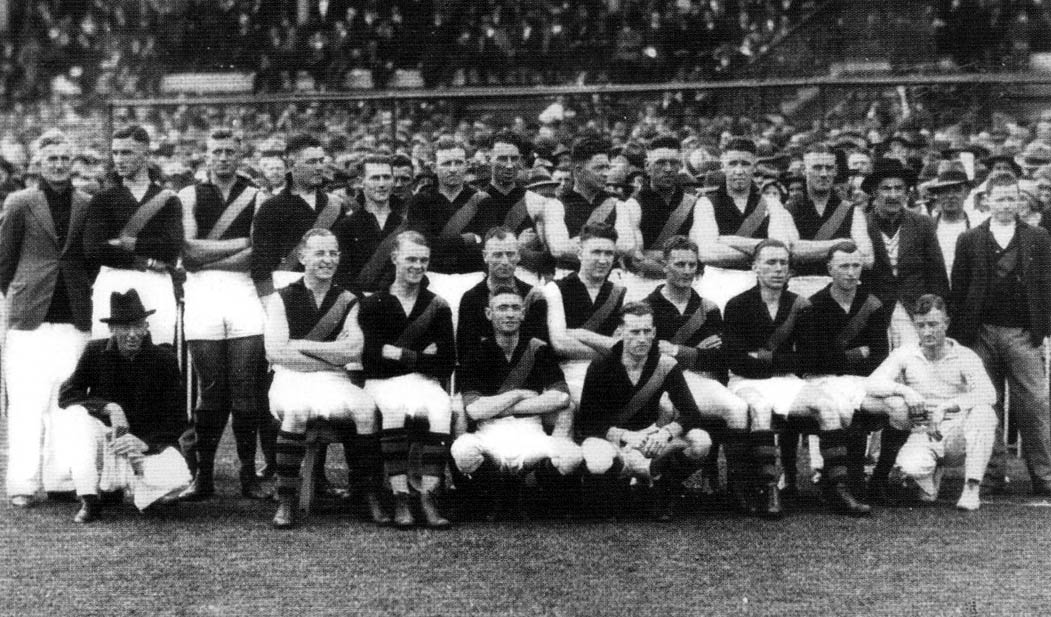
- Richmond 1932 VFL premiership team

Overview
- Date: 30 April – 1 October 1932
- Teams: 12
- Premiers: Richmond; 3rd premiership
- Runners-up: Carlton; 6th runners-up result
- Minor premiers: Carlton; 8th minor premiership
- Brownlow Medallist: Haydn Bunton Sr. (Fitzroy); 23 votes
- Leading goalkicker medallist: George Moloney (Geelong); 109 goals

Attendance
- Matches played: 112
- Total attendance: 1,876,973 (16,759 per match)
- Highest (H&A): 41,000 (round 13, South Melbourne v Carlton)
- Highest (finals): 69,724 (grand final, Richmond v Carlton)

The 1932 VFL season was the 36th season of the Victorian Football League (VFL), the highest-level senior Australian rules football competition in Victoria. The season featured twelve clubs and ran from 30 April to 1 October, comprising an 18-match home-and-away season followed by a four-week finals series featuring the top four clubs.

Richmond won the premiership, defeating Carlton by nine points in the 1932 VFL grand final; it was Richmond's third VFL premiership. Carlton won the minor premiership by finishing atop the home-and-away ladder with a 15–3 win–loss record. Fitzroy's Haydn Bunton Sr. won his second consecutive Brownlow Medal as the league's best and fairest player, and Geelong's George Moloney won the leading goalkicker medal as the league's leading goalkicker.

== Background ==
In 1932, the VFL competition consisted of twelve teams of 18 on-the-field players each, plus one substitute player, known as the 19th man. A player could be substituted for any reason; however, once substituted, a player could not return to the field of play under any circumstances.

Teams played each other in a home-and-away season of 18 rounds; matches 12 to 18 were the "home-and-way reverse" of matches 1 to 7.

Once the 18 round home-and-away season had finished, the 1932 VFL Premiers were determined by the specific format and conventions of the Page–McIntyre system.

== Home-and-away season ==
=== Round 1 ===
Home team	Home team score	Away team	Away team score	Venue	Crowd	Date
Richmond	16.20 (116)	St Kilda	6.14 (50)	Punt Road Oval	25,000	30 April 1932
Geelong	14.21 (105)	North Melbourne	11.12 (78)	Corio Oval	13,000	30 April 1932
Essendon	15.15 (105)	Footscray	7.12 (54)	Windy Hill	30,000	30 April 1932
South Melbourne	11.19 (85)	Melbourne	9.11 (65)	Lake Oval	17,500	30 April 1932
Hawthorn	7.9 (51)	Collingwood	11.10 (76)	Glenferrie Oval	14,500	30 April 1932
Fitzroy	12.19 (91)	Carlton	10.15 (75)	Brunswick Street Oval	25,000	30 April 1932

=== Round 2 ===
Home team	Home team score	Away team	Away team score	Venue	Crowd	Date
Collingwood	12.11 (83)	Geelong	13.16 (94)	Victoria Park	18,000	7 May 1932
Carlton	10.15 (75)	South Melbourne	17.11 (113)	Princes Park	28,000	7 May 1932
St Kilda	16.19 (115)	Hawthorn	11.16 (82)	Junction Oval	13,000	7 May 1932
Footscray	14.11 (95)	Fitzroy	7.10 (52)	Western Oval	21,500	7 May 1932
North Melbourne	14.12 (96)	Essendon	16.17 (113)	Arden Street Oval	15,000	7 May 1932
Melbourne	7.13 (55)	Richmond	15.26 (116)	Motordrome	13,000	7 May 1932

=== Round 3 ===
Home team	Home team score	Away team	Away team score	Venue	Crowd	Date
Hawthorn	8.11 (59)	Melbourne	6.14 (50)	Glenferrie Oval	8,000	14 May 1932
Geelong	25.10 (160)	St Kilda	6.9 (45)	Corio Oval	10,500	14 May 1932
Fitzroy	13.16 (94)	North Melbourne	17.11 (113)	Brunswick Street Oval	15,000	14 May 1932
South Melbourne	10.11 (71)	Footscray	8.12 (60)	Lake Oval	30,000	14 May 1932
Essendon	15.20 (110)	Collingwood	18.11 (119)	Windy Hill	18,000	14 May 1932
Richmond	10.23 (83)	Carlton	12.12 (84)	Punt Road Oval	24,500	14 May 1932

=== Round 4 ===
Home team	Home team score	Away team	Away team score	Venue	Crowd	Date
North Melbourne	9.16 (70)	South Melbourne	11.7 (73)	Arden Street Oval	23,000	21 May 1932
Footscray	6.12 (48)	Richmond	7.9 (51)	Western Oval	19,000	21 May 1932
Collingwood	14.22 (106)	Fitzroy	11.9 (75)	Victoria Park	17,000	21 May 1932
Carlton	16.16 (112)	Hawthorn	7.7 (49)	Princes Park	16,000	21 May 1932
St Kilda	7.15 (57)	Essendon	12.15 (87)	Junction Oval	16,000	21 May 1932
Melbourne	14.11 (95)	Geelong	20.13 (133)	Motordrome	7,000	21 May 1932

=== Round 5 ===
Home team	Home team score	Away team	Away team score	Venue	Crowd	Date
Footscray	13.14 (92)	St Kilda	8.10 (58)	Western Oval	14,000	28 May 1932
Fitzroy	12.6 (78)	Geelong	20.10 (130)	Brunswick Street Oval	13,000	28 May 1932
Carlton	13.15 (93)	Collingwood	11.7 (73)	Princes Park	32,000	28 May 1932
North Melbourne	18.10 (118)	Melbourne	12.16 (88)	Arden Street Oval	12,000	28 May 1932
Richmond	13.18 (96)	Hawthorn	6.9 (45)	Punt Road Oval	10,000	28 May 1932
South Melbourne	14.15 (99)	Essendon	9.11 (65)	Lake Oval	28,000	28 May 1932

=== Round 6 ===
Home team	Home team score	Away team	Away team score	Venue	Crowd	Date
Hawthorn	11.14 (80)	South Melbourne	16.13 (109)	Glenferrie Oval	12,000	4 June 1932
Geelong	9.15 (69)	Richmond	9.15 (69)	Corio Oval	17,000	4 June 1932
Essendon	22.10 (142)	Fitzroy	13.12 (90)	Windy Hill	15,000	4 June 1932
Collingwood	12.19 (91)	Footscray	9.21 (75)	Victoria Park	25,000	4 June 1932
St Kilda	16.9 (105)	North Melbourne	16.14 (110)	Junction Oval	13,000	4 June 1932
Melbourne	9.9 (63)	Carlton	12.15 (87)	Motordrome	12,500	4 June 1932

=== Round 7 ===
Home team	Home team score	Away team	Away team score	Venue	Crowd	Date
Collingwood	16.5 (101)	Melbourne	11.17 (83)	Victoria Park	7,000	18 June 1932
Carlton	17.16 (118)	St Kilda	7.12 (54)	Princes Park	15,000	18 June 1932
South Melbourne	14.21 (105)	Geelong	14.12 (96)	Lake Oval	38,000	18 June 1932
North Melbourne	9.8 (62)	Footscray	13.13 (91)	Arden Street Oval	18,000	18 June 1932
Richmond	14.16 (100)	Fitzroy	8.13 (61)	Punt Road Oval	13,000	18 June 1932
Hawthorn	7.9 (51)	Essendon	8.17 (65)	Glenferrie Oval	7,000	18 June 1932

=== Round 8 ===
Home team	Home team score	Away team	Away team score	Venue	Crowd	Date
Richmond	8.7 (55)	South Melbourne	8.9 (57)	Punt Road Oval	35,000	25 June 1932
Footscray	10.7 (67)	Melbourne	3.9 (27)	Western Oval	10,000	25 June 1932
Fitzroy	13.15 (93)	Hawthorn	9.9 (63)	Brunswick Street Oval	7,500	25 June 1932
Geelong	9.9 (63)	Essendon	11.12 (78)	Corio Oval	9,500	25 June 1932
St Kilda	12.16 (88)	Collingwood	15.15 (105)	Junction Oval	9,000	25 June 1932
North Melbourne	11.7 (73)	Carlton	14.16 (100)	Arden Street Oval	15,000	25 June 1932

=== Round 9 ===
Home team	Home team score	Away team	Away team score	Venue	Crowd	Date
Melbourne	12.13 (85)	St Kilda	10.14 (74)	MCG	9,747	2 July 1932
Essendon	4.18 (42)	Richmond	11.14 (80)	Windy Hill	20,000	2 July 1932
Collingwood	19.12 (126)	North Melbourne	13.9 (87)	Victoria Park	10,500	2 July 1932
Carlton	9.21 (75)	Footscray	7.9 (51)	Princes Park	23,000	2 July 1932
Hawthorn	7.12 (54)	Geelong	14.11 (95)	Glenferrie Oval	5,500	2 July 1932
South Melbourne	12.10 (82)	Fitzroy	10.15 (75)	Lake Oval	16,000	2 July 1932

=== Round 10 ===
Home team	Home team score	Away team	Away team score	Venue	Crowd	Date
St Kilda	10.9 (69)	South Melbourne	9.16 (70)	Junction Oval	13,000	9 July 1932
Footscray	7.15 (57)	Geelong	8.8 (56)	Western Oval	9,500	9 July 1932
Collingwood	14.6 (90)	Richmond	11.12 (78)	Victoria Park	20,000	9 July 1932
Carlton	21.16 (142)	Essendon	11.11 (77)	Princes Park	15,000	9 July 1932
North Melbourne	14.22 (106)	Hawthorn	8.11 (59)	Arden Street Oval	6,000	9 July 1932
Melbourne	15.12 (102)	Fitzroy	13.12 (90)	MCG	9,807	9 July 1932

=== Round 11 ===
Home team	Home team score	Away team	Away team score	Venue	Crowd	Date
Fitzroy	11.6 (72)	St Kilda	10.13 (73)	Brunswick Street Oval	10,000	16 July 1932
Essendon	6.14 (50)	Melbourne	7.11 (53)	Windy Hill	10,000	16 July 1932
Richmond	8.10 (58)	North Melbourne	6.7 (43)	Punt Road Oval	11,500	16 July 1932
Hawthorn	9.9 (63)	Footscray	6.6 (42)	Glenferrie Oval	7,500	16 July 1932
South Melbourne	5.17 (47)	Collingwood	7.8 (50)	Lake Oval	38,000	16 July 1932
Geelong	8.20 (68)	Carlton	10.23 (83)	Corio Oval	14,000	16 July 1932

=== Round 12 ===
Home team	Home team score	Away team	Away team score	Venue	Crowd	Date
Melbourne	12.12 (84)	South Melbourne	13.15 (93)	MCG	20,283	23 July 1932
Collingwood	14.10 (94)	Hawthorn	10.10 (70)	Victoria Park	9,000	23 July 1932
Carlton	18.21 (129)	Fitzroy	13.6 (84)	Princes Park	20,000	23 July 1932
St Kilda	7.12 (54)	Richmond	12.13 (85)	Junction Oval	18,000	23 July 1932
North Melbourne	6.14 (50)	Geelong	14.10 (94)	Arden Street Oval	12,000	23 July 1932
Footscray	11.16 (82)	Essendon	10.9 (69)	Western Oval	14,000	23 July 1932

=== Round 13 ===
Home team	Home team score	Away team	Away team score	Venue	Crowd	Date
Hawthorn	8.13 (61)	St Kilda	7.8 (50)	Glenferrie Oval	6,000	30 July 1932
Fitzroy	6.13 (49)	Footscray	10.14 (74)	Brunswick Street Oval	10,000	30 July 1932
Essendon	14.14 (98)	North Melbourne	15.2 (92)	Windy Hill	9,000	30 July 1932
Richmond	12.18 (90)	Melbourne	10.6 (66)	Punt Road Oval	11,000	30 July 1932
Geelong	13.17 (95)	Collingwood	10.10 (70)	Corio Oval	11,000	30 July 1932
South Melbourne	11.14 (80)	Carlton	12.17 (89)	Lake Oval	41,000	30 July 1932

=== Round 14 ===
Home team	Home team score	Away team	Away team score	Venue	Crowd	Date
Footscray	11.14 (80)	South Melbourne	9.14 (68)	Western Oval	18,000	6 August 1932
Collingwood	14.15 (99)	Essendon	9.13 (67)	Victoria Park	10,000	6 August 1932
Carlton	12.14 (86)	Richmond	13.13 (91)	Princes Park	31,000	6 August 1932
Melbourne	12.4 (76)	Hawthorn	10.12 (72)	MCG	6,486	6 August 1932
St Kilda	15.19 (109)	Geelong	13.18 (96)	Junction Oval	10,000	6 August 1932
North Melbourne	12.17 (89)	Fitzroy	10.8 (68)	Arden Street Oval	6,000	6 August 1932

=== Round 15 ===
Home team	Home team score	Away team	Away team score	Venue	Crowd	Date
Geelong	15.14 (104)	Melbourne	5.13 (43)	Corio Oval	6,000	13 August 1932
Essendon	14.13 (97)	St Kilda	8.10 (58)	Windy Hill	10,000	13 August 1932
South Melbourne	9.13 (67)	North Melbourne	4.11 (35)	Lake Oval	15,000	13 August 1932
Richmond	9.11 (65)	Footscray	8.12 (60)	Punt Road Oval	25,000	13 August 1932
Fitzroy	11.13 (79)	Collingwood	12.26 (98)	Brunswick Street Oval	12,500	13 August 1932
Hawthorn	8.14 (62)	Carlton	12.12 (84)	Glenferrie Oval	9,000	13 August 1932

=== Round 16 ===
Home team	Home team score	Away team	Away team score	Venue	Crowd	Date
Melbourne	14.9 (93)	North Melbourne	16.22 (118)	MCG	7,246	20 August 1932
Hawthorn	6.9 (45)	Richmond	16.16 (112)	Glenferrie Oval	10,000	20 August 1932
Essendon	13.12 (90)	South Melbourne	11.20 (86)	Windy Hill	15,000	20 August 1932
St Kilda	10.5 (65)	Footscray	9.17 (71)	Junction Oval	13,000	20 August 1932
Geelong	25.18 (168)	Fitzroy	8.6 (54)	Corio Oval	6,500	20 August 1932
Collingwood	11.13 (79)	Carlton	17.23 (125)	Victoria Park	33,000	20 August 1932

=== Round 17 ===
Home team	Home team score	Away team	Away team score	Venue	Crowd	Date
North Melbourne	14.21 (105)	St Kilda	13.7 (85)	Arden Street Oval	7,000	27 August 1932
Carlton	15.15 (105)	Melbourne	9.9 (63)	Princes Park	12,000	27 August 1932
South Melbourne	24.13 (157)	Hawthorn	4.10 (34)	Lake Oval	10,000	27 August 1932
Richmond	13.8 (86)	Geelong	9.20 (74)	Punt Road Oval	26,000	27 August 1932
Fitzroy	12.17 (89)	Essendon	7.10 (52)	Brunswick Street Oval	10,000	27 August 1932
Footscray	9.12 (66)	Collingwood	11.5 (71)	Western Oval	15,000	27 August 1932

=== Round 18 ===
Home team	Home team score	Away team	Away team score	Venue	Crowd	Date
Geelong	17.23 (125)	South Melbourne	9.15 (69)	Corio Oval	9,500	3 September 1932
Footscray	9.10 (64)	North Melbourne	12.18 (90)	Western Oval	11,000	3 September 1932
Fitzroy	10.7 (67)	Richmond	14.11 (95)	Brunswick Street Oval	14,000	3 September 1932
Essendon	11.15 (81)	Hawthorn	4.10 (34)	Windy Hill	7,000	3 September 1932
Melbourne	13.12 (90)	Collingwood	16.17 (113)	MCG	10,698	3 September 1932
St Kilda	7.12 (54)	Carlton	20.21 (141)	Junction Oval	15,000	3 September 1932

== Ladder ==
(P)	Premiers
	Qualified for finals

#	Team	P	W	L	D	PF	PA	%	Pts
1	Carlton	18	15	3	0	1803	1308	137.8	60
2	Richmond (P)	18	14	3	1	1526	1096	139.2	58
3	Collingwood	18	14	4	0	1644	1473	111.6	56
4	South Melbourne	18	13	5	0	1531	1297	118.0	52
5	Geelong	18	11	6	1	1825	1306	139.7	46
6	Essendon	18	10	8	0	1488	1444	103.0	40
7	Footscray	18	9	9	0	1229	1188	103.5	36
8	North Melbourne	18	8	10	0	1535	1581	97.1	32
9	Melbourne	18	4	14	0	1281	1675	76.5	16
10	Fitzroy	18	3	15	0	1361	1786	76.2	12
11	St Kilda	18	3	15	0	1263	1753	72.0	12
12	Hawthorn	18	3	15	0	1034	1613	64.1	12

Rules for classification: 1. premiership points; 2. percentage; 3. points for
Average score: 81.1
Source: AFL Tables

== Finals series ==
=== Semi-finals ===
Home team	Score	Away team	Score	Venue	Crowd	Date
Collingwood	17.12 (114)	South Melbourne	12.16 (88)	MCG	51,209	10 September
Carlton	14.15 (99)	Richmond	18.16 (124)	MCG	63.326	17 September

=== Preliminary final ===
Home team	Score	Away team	Score	Venue	Crowd	Date
Carlton	23.19 (157)	Collingwood	11.16 (82)	MCG	46,447	24 September

== Season notes ==
- Rain had delayed the resurfacing of the Melbourne Cricket Ground, so Melbourne arranged to play its first three matches for the year at the Motordrome. These were the only three VFL matches ever staged at the venue.
- In round 11, due to the effects of an extremely strong cross-wind that blew all day at the Lake Oval, the up-to-that-time-unbeaten South Melbourne lost to Collingwood, kicking 5.17 (47) to their opponent's more accurate 7.8 (50).
- After the match was over, it was revealed that Richmond wingman Allan Geddes had played the entire second half of the Grand-Final with a broken jaw.

== Awards ==
- The 1932 VFL Premiership team was Richmond.
- The VFL's leading goalkicker was George Moloney of Geelong with 109 goals (all scored during the home-and-away season).
- The winner of the 1932 Brownlow Medal was Haydn Bunton, Sr of Fitzroy with 23 votes.
- Hawthorn took the "wooden spoon" in 1932.
- The seconds premiership was won by Melbourne. Melbourne 8.12 (60) defeated Essendon 4.10 (34) in the Grand Final, played as a curtain-raiser to the firsts Grand Final on 1 October at the Melbourne Cricket Ground.

== Sources ==
- 1932 VFL season at AFL Tables
- 1932 VFL season at Australian Football
