= Bob Ross (Australian footballer) =

Australian rules footballer, born 1908

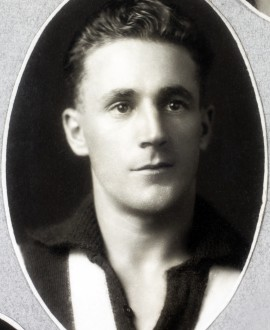
- Ross during his Collingwood career

Personal information
- Born: 17 August 1908
- Died: 3 July 1988 (aged 79)
- Original team: Fairfield Amateurs
- Height: 163 cm (5 ft 4 in)
- Weight: 58 kg (128 lb)
- Position: Rover

Playing career
Years	Club	Games (Goals)
1929–1931	Collingwood	10 (10)
1930s	Northcote	139

Bob Ross (17 August 1908 – 3 July 1988) was an Australian rules footballer who played for Collingwood in the Victorian Football League (VFL).

Ross was unable to establish himself in the Collingwood team from the limited opportunities that he got. Such was the strength of the side that they were premiers in the first two seasons Ross played and he only experienced a loss once. He wasn't picked in either finals series and after one game in 1931, left the club for the Victorian Football Association.

The rover became a decorated player at Northcote, with a Recorder Cup win in 1932. He was a member of four premiership teams, three of them in succession from 1932 to 1934 and the other in 1936.
