= Ralph Goullet =

Australian rules footballer, born 1904

Personal information
- Full name: Ralph Augustus Goullet
- Born: 25 January 1904; Richmond, Victoria
- Died: 24 December 1993 (aged 89)
- Original team: Richmond 2nds
- Height: 183 cm (6 ft 0 in)
- Weight: 87 kg (192 lb)
- Position: Ruckman

Playing career^{1}
Years	Club	Games (Goals)
1928	Hawthorn (VFL)	14 (6)
1929–1935	Northcote (VFA)	
1936–1937	Brighton (VFA)	
- ^{1} Playing statistics correct to the end of 1937.

Ralph Augustus Goullet (25 January 1904 – 24 December 1993) was an Australian rules footballer who played for Hawthorn in the Victorian Football League (VFL).

Goullet played in the seconds at Richmond but after not being able to break into the seniors crossed over to Hawthorn. The club, in just its fourth VFL season, struggled on the field and Goullet was in the losing team in each of his 14 games.

Goullet had much more success at Northcote, where he played in Northcote's 1932 and 1933 VFA premierships, including another one as captain-coach in 1934. Brighton secured his services as playing coach in 1936.
