= Peter Grant Hay =

Australian brewer and racehorse breeder (1879–1961)

- Born: 9 July 1879; Bright, Victoria, Australia
- Died: 29 August 1961 (aged 82); Melbourne, Victoria, Australia
- Occupations: Brewer, Racehorse Breeder
- Spouse: Margaret Glover
- Children: Patricia, Kathleen, Alison, Peter
- Parent(s): James Grant Hay; Catherine Margaret Cox
- Relatives: James Grant Hay (grandson); Sir Rupert Clarke (son in-law)

Peter Grant Hay (9 July 1879 – 29 August 1961) was an Australian brewer, landowner, pastoralist and thoroughbred racehorse breeder. He founded the Richmond N.S. (Nathan System) Brewing Co. Ltd (Carlton & United Breweries) in Melbourne Australia.

He is responsible for both the introduction of pasteurisation to Australia's dairy industry and the introduction of the Swiss Nathan System of brewing to Australia. He was the youngest of five children.

== Early life and background ==
Grant Hay was born in Bright, Victoria, the son of James Grant Hay, partner of Melbourne shipping firm, Coulson Hay & Co. and Catherine Margaret (née Cox), daughter of Irish distillery founder, Charles Cox. The Grant Hay's owned hop farm estates in Bright, Victoria and the Derwent Valley in Tasmania and were the main supplier of hops to Carlton & United Breweries in Victoria.

=== United States & England ===
Upon the death of his father in 1914, Grant Hay traveled to America by steamship to San Francisco on board the USS American, meeting Tooheys Brewery manager Arnold Resch. The two agreed to inspect the major American breweries of Milwaukee, including the Valentin Blatz Brewing Company, Joseph Schlitz Brewing Company, and the Miller Brewing Company and Anheuser-Busch brewing company in St Louis. Grant Hay then sailed to London to inspect the Courage Brewery plant and its hotels.

=== Switzerland & Germany ===
He then flew to Zurich and met with Dr Leopold Nathan, a Swiss chemist, who had invented a new brewing system. Grant Hay drove to Munich and attended Oktoberfest in the company of the Reinheitsgebot before the outbreak of war and returned to Australia.

=== Australia ===
In 1918 he married Margaret Glover, cousin of Australian landscape artist John Glover. Grant Hay was forty. They had four children, Patricia, Kathleen, Alison and Peter. The Grant Hay's settled at Sackville Street, Kew and later moved to 'Egoline' at Albany Road in Toorak, Victoria. The family also owned 'Kilby Park,'a one hundred acre dairy farm and thoroughbred racehorse stud at Kew, Victoria.

By age fifty Grant Hay was already one of Victoria's wealthiest hop merchants when the Victorian beer wars began in 1925. Carlton & United Breweries had grown into Australia's largest brewer and began to use monopolistic practices of lowering the cost of supply to hop growers, including Grant Hay's 'Kentdale' hops from the Derwent Valley.

== Richmond N.S. Brewing Co. ==
=== Hop Merchants ===
The Kentdale Hop Estate was one of the finest properties in Tasmania. It was located fifty kilometres from Hobart and harvested thirty hectares of finest-quality hops. In 1927 a business disagreement took place between Grant Hay and Carlton & United Breweries over the price and quantity of hops, causing Carlton to cancel its contract with Kentdale.

Resentful of Carlton's unfair business practices, Grant Hay proceeded to off-load his hops successfully to Carlton's interstate rival, Tooheys. He then summoned a meeting of his hop estate managers from Bright in Victoria and the Derwent Valley in Tasmania for a meeting at Coulson Hay & Co. headquarters in Melbourne to establish his own brewery.

=== Zurich, Prohibition & Chicago ===
On 4 April 1927, Grant Hay wired a cable to Dr Leopold Nathan in Zurich, Switzerland for the order of the first Swiss Nathan Brewing System to be shipped to Melbourne and to be accompanied by Master Swiss Brewer, Heinrich Walter Haenggi of Zurich. Over the course of three months, Grant Hay proceeded to buy up five industrial sites adjoining his Church Street property. He then ordered a consignment of three thousand units of purified gin to be shipped from British Army headquarters in Lahore and resold the rebottled gin to American bootleggers in prohibition controlled Chicago, netting Coulson Hay & Co. a million pounds. The deal set Grant Hay up for life, and bankrolled the construction of the brewery.

=== Construction & Law ===
On 13 August 1927, Grant Hay's application for permit to build a brewery on the site at Church Street Richmond was approved by the Richmond City Council. Grant Hay then hired contractors to excavate the site in preparation of the brewery's construction, when the excavation was delayed, Grant Hay proceeded to dynamite the site himself using three tonnes of dynamite.

On the morning of 23 August 1927, the sound of percussion could be heard as far away as Brighton, and was said to have woken the Mayor of Melbourne from his sleep. When nearby Richmond residents objected, Grant Hay sued the residents and offered to buy their homes. Eventually, council sided with the residents and sought an injunction against Grant Hay to the detonation, but Grant Hay won on appeal and continued unabated.

Mr Grant Hay retained Brigadier Sir Eugene Gorman KBE, MC, QC as his full-time barrister and confidant. Litigous by nature, Grant Hay later sued the Camberwell City Council on its liquor licensing trading laws on appeal before the Privy Council, UK. Mr Gorman's rooms in the Equity Chambers building on Melbourne's Bourke Street are named Gorman Chambers in his honour.

=== Nathan System ===
On 24 October 1927, Heinrich Walter Haenggi and his wife arrived at Port Melbourne aboard the SS Modolva bringing with them the single largest steel works consignment for disembarkation. Three transports were used to unload and deliver the Swiss brewing plant machinery and equipment to Church Street. Mr Grant Hay drove the Haenggi's to their hotel in his new 1927 Packard Roadster and held a dinner in honour of their arrival at his home.

By Easter of 1928, the construction of the Richmond Brewery was completed and a toast was held on the assembly line by Mrs Grant Hay and included two hundred guests, from growers, hoteliers and workers. The brewery began its first run of Richmond Lager and Bitter Beer on 24 April 1928 with 88 dozen bottles of output per week which continued to grow to 200 dozen bottles of output per week by 1929. Within three years output of beer had grown to 1000 hogsheads per week (317,974 bottles) and Richmond beer couldn’t be produced fast enough. The quality of the beer, and the fact that it had been produced free of any combine commended the beverage to the public's taste. With his own hop supplies, Grant Hay had lowered his costs of production and unit costs considerably. He then followed Courage Brewery's example by purchasing his own pubs and hotel outlets across Australia, exclusively serving Richmond beer.

=== Success & Output ===
The Richmond Brewery was a remarkable success. By 1940 shipments of Richmond Lager were eagerly consumed in Melbourne, Perth, Sydney, Brisbane and Adelaide. By 1950 annual turnover revenues in the Richmond Brewery had grown to almost three million pounds. Exports to India and Brazil soon followed, with the bottle labels Richmond Pilsener, Lager Bitter and Stout all sporting the illustrated Tiger's head logo, designed by Mrs Grant Hay.

=== World War II & Racing ===
During World War II, Grant Hay negotiated the supply of Richmond Beer to Australian troops in North Africa and American troops stationed at Sandown Racecourse, which he owned. He also purchased land on Flinders Island in Tasmania where he stood Fourth Hand, winner of the 1927 Irish 2,000 Guineas and bred champion Australian racehorse Counsel, winner of the 1944 Caulfield Cup and champion American racehorse, Warra Nymph at Del Mar. Grant Hay also owned the seventy-two foot ketch, "Jane Moorhead" which was used by General Douglas MacArthur for the Allied troop landings in the Pacific.

By 1960 the brewery continued to prosper controlling sixteen per cent of Victorian beer sales and eight per cent of Australian beer sales nationally. Mr Grant Hay's health was however deteriorating and no succession plan was put in place, despite his only surviving son. A charismatic autocrat and fierce business competitor, Mr Grant Hay would not allow the company to be controlled by anyone but himself. He refused to publicly list the company and repeatedly rejected merger offers from Courage Brewery and Carlton & United Breweries.

Upon his death in 1961, Mrs Grant Hay negotiated the sale of the Richmond Brewery between bidders Courage Brewery, Asahi Breweries and Carlton & United Breweries, accepting a final offer to purchase the brewery from Carlton & United Breweries on January 26, 1962.

=== Terms of Settlement ===
The financial terms of the agreement reached included an undisclosed cash and share settlement to the Grant Hay family in Carlton & United Breweries, with the caveat that no member of the Grant Hay family or its heirs shall commence operations in a brewing enterprise against Carlton & United Breweries or its subsidiaries in Australia until after the year 2018. Mr Grant Hay is survived by his direct descendants including his grandson, James Grant Hay.

Carlton & United Breweries closed the Richmond Brewery doors on April 13, 1962, and later demolished and sold the site in 1964. Carlton & United Breweries own the intellectual property labels of the Richmond Brewery. Foster's Group Limited was renamed Carlton & United Breweries prior to its 2011 sale to British-South African multinational SABMiller.

=== Appendix ===
The Richmond Brewery Company's headquarters were located at 654 Church Street, Richmond and had offices at 26 Hunter Street and Sussex Street, Sydney, 86 King Street, Perth and 5 Cliff Street, Freemantle. There were one hundred and thirty five full-time staff and the company owned and operated twenty-eight hotels and pubs across Australia.
