= Northcote Football Club =

Names
- Full name: Northcote Football Club
- Nickname(s): Dragons, Brickfielders, Rosellas, Cotes

Club details
- Founded: c. 1869
- Dissolved: 1987
- Colours: Green Yellow
- Competition: Victorian Junior Football Association (1880s–1907); Victorian Football Association (1908–1987)
- Premierships: VJFA (2): 1904; 1906; VFA (Div 1) (5): 1929; 1932; 1933; 1934; 1936; VFA (Div 2) (2): 1961; 1982
- Ground: Northcote Park (1908, 1915–1987); Croxton Park (1909–1914)

Uniforms
Home

The Northcote Football Club (/ˈnoːθ.kət/), nicknamed the Dragons, was an Australian rules football club which played in the VFA from 1908 until 1987. The club's colours for most of its time in the VFA were green and yellow, and it was based in the Melbourne suburb of Northcote.

== History ==
The earliest mentions of a Northcote Football Club appear in mid 1869. The club was established as a junior club, and it initially contested the Victorian Junior Football Association. The club played its games at Croxton Park until 1903, before moving to Northcote Park in 1904. The club was successful at junior level during the 1900s, winning premierships in 1904 and 1906.

The club then joined senior football in the Victorian Football Association from the VJFA in 1908, and moved its home ground back to Croxton Park in 1909. Prior to the 1912 season, Northcote and neighbouring northern suburban club Preston, who were both struggling on-field, amalgamated; the merged club was known as the 'Northcote and Preston Football Club' in official records until 1918, but always played under the Northcote name and retained Northcote's home ground and colours.

The club's committee underwent a split in 1914, between one faction which wanted to return to Northcote Park and another which wanted to stay at Croxton Park. The VFA sided with the Northcote Park faction, in part because Croxton Park – a private ground adjoining the Croxton Park Hotel – had been notorious for more than a decade for the unruly conduct of its patrons; a new committee, which included members of the Northcote Cricket Club committee, was appointed and recognised by the VFA, and the club moved to Northcote Park, where it stayed for the remainder of its time in the VFA. The Croxton Park faction established a rival club called the City of Northcote Football Club, which played at Croxton Park in the VJFA until the venue's closure at the end of 1918.

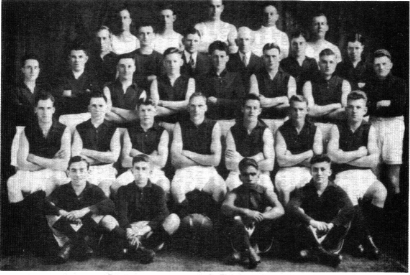
The 1929 premiership side.

For its first two decades in the VFA, Northcote failed to have a significant impact. This changed in 1928, when the club's ability to draw spectators was most threatened by its strong VFL neighbours Collingwood and Fitzroy. In 1928, the club worked to eliminate its debt; and then in 1929, embarked on a strong recruiting campaign which netted Percy Rowe as captain-coach, and Ernie Wilson, Greg Stockdale, Norm Cockram, Tommy Corrigan, Bill Koop and Frank Seymour, among others, from VFL clubs. This saw the club rise from a 3–15 record in 1928 (avoiding the wooden spoon on percentage) to a 17–5 record in 1929, winning the minor premiership, followed by its first VFA premiership. Under the Argus finals system, the club played three matches for the premiership against Port Melbourne: the first final was drawn 9.17 (71) to 10.11 (71), the replay was won by Port Melbourne 8.7 (55) d. 6.15 (51), and the challenge final was finally won 15.21 (111) d. 10.9 (69). Still with the core of its 1929 team, Northcote then twice finished runners up against Oakleigh – losing a 1930 final 7.9 (51) def by. 9.6 (60) which was notorious for its roughness, then losing the 1931 grand final 11.5 (71) def. by 10.14 (74).

Although many of its 1929 league recruits had now been cleared, a core team bolstered by a strong crop of local juniors continued to perform strongly during the height of the Great Depression. With much of the credit going to Percy Rowe's leadership, Frank Seymour's then record-breaking goalkicking, and the club committee's tireless fundraising, Northcote went on to win a three-peat of minor and major premierships in 1932, 1933 and 1934. The club defeated Coburg in all three deciding games: the 1932 final, 13.11 (89) d. 8.15 (63); the 1933 grand final 11.20 (86) d. 9.16 (70); and then, under the coaching of Ralph Goullet, the 1934 grand final, 19.16 (130) d. 10.9 (69). The three premierships also resulted in the club permanently winning the Grant Hay Shield, a semi-perpetual premiership trophy inaugurated in 1932 and won by the first club to win it three times. Through this time, Seymour became the second player to kick 100 goals in a VFA season in 1930, and repeating the achievement in 1932 and 1934. The club won a fourth consecutive minor premiership in 1935, finishing four wins ahead of second place, but lost both of its finals to finish third.

The 1936 season was tumultuous, but successful. Collingwood's Harold Rumney joined the club as captain-coach, but retired after a 1–4 start to the season. He was replaced by Alec Grey and Jack Lyngcoln, serving unusually as co-coaches, who brought the club back to reach the final four with an 11–6–1 record; and, through the latter part of the year, the club trained at Preston because Northcote Park was unavailable to complete drainage works ahead of the cricket season. Despite this, Northcote won three finals, culminating in a 19.6 (130) d. 15.15 (105) victory against Prahran in the grand final which was regarded as one of the finest matches in Association history – to complete an eight-year stretch netting five premierships from seven grand finals, as well as five minor premierships. The club finished fifth to miss the 1937 finals, then finished third and fourth respectively in 1938 and 1939.

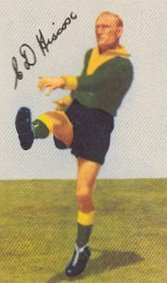
1951 Liston Trophy winner Cec Hiscox in his Northcote colours

The club's sustained successes of the 1930s were never repeated, and once football resumed after World War II, Northcote became one of the weakest clubs in the Association. The club had a low supporter base, often struggled to fill its committee positions, and offered lower match payments than most other clubs, to the point when the club was fully amateur from 1953 until 1955, then again in 1958. The club was rumoured to be close to disbanding at different times during the 1950s. This weakness was reflected in generally poor onfield performances – with the notable exception of a preliminary final appearance in 1954 when the club was fully amateur.

After the Association split into two divisions, Northcote won the inaugural Division 2 premiership in 1961, defeating Dandenong 12.15 (87) d. 9.18 (72) in the Grand Final. Promoted to Division 1, the club spent only two seasons in Division 1 before being relegated at the end of 1963. It never returned to the top division, and spent the next 24 years competing in Division 2 and financially viable. The club remained middle-of-the-pack in Division 2 throughout the 1960s and 1970s, often finishing just outside the finals. The club won its second Division 2 premiership in 1982, defeating Caulfield 12.15 (87) d. 11.16 (82); it was not promoted to Division 1 after the premiership due to a restructure of the two-division system, but the club later commented that it probably could not have afforded the extra expense of playing in the top division.

Still a small club with a small supporter base, Northcote was one of many clubs unable to cope with acutely rising operating costs in the early 1980s. The club announced its withdrawal from the VFA in November 1984, but returned two months later under a new committee. It played three more years, but its financial situation did not improve and its membership dropped to fewer than 100. It was suspended from the VFA in November 1987 after it lost tenancy of Northcote Park and could no longer commit to fielding a team in all three grades, and ultimately folded.

Northcote was originally nicknamed the Brickfielders because of the local brickworks. For a time in the late 1930s and 1940s, the team was known as the Rosellas. Their nickname in the latter half of the 20th century was Dragons, and they were also colloquially known as the Cotes. The club is best associated with dark green and gold colours; but, it wore blue and white as a junior club, and in its first three seasons in the VFA, before changing to green and gold in 1911 to distinguish itself from North Melbourne. It also wore maroon guernseys for a few years following World War I due to the unavailability of green and gold wool at the time. Until around 1975, the club's guernseys were green with a gold 'V' neck; the club then moved to a slightly brighter green with gold vertical stripes, following a trend which many clubs had taken to look brighter on colour television, which had just been introduced to Australia.

== Premierships ==
- Victorian Junior Football Association (2): 1904, 1906
- Victorian Football Association (5): 1929, 1932, 1933, 1934, 1936
- VFA Division 2 (2): 1961, 1982
- Grant Hay Shield (1): 1934

== VFA club records ==
Highest Score	39.30 (264) v Sunshine, Round 17, 1982, Northcote Park
Lowest Score	0.4 (4) v North Melbourne, Round 15, 1919, Arden Street Oval
Greatest Winning Margin	189 points v Sunshine, Round 6, 1983, Northcote Park
Greatest Losing Margin	227 points v Prahran, Round 17, 1986, Toorak Park
Lowest Winning Score	3.14 (32) v Port Melbourne 4.7 (31), Round 11, 1909, Croxton Park
Highest Losing Score	22.13 (145) v Frankston 24.13 (157), Round 2, 1977, Frankston Park

== Club Coaches ==
Seniors

- 1922 - Percy Ogden
- 1923 - Maurie Sheehy
- 1924 - F. Moore
- 1925 - Gus Dobrigh
- 1926 - H. Dimmick
- 1927 - 1928: Bill Adams
- 1929 - 1934: Percy Rowe
- 1935 - Ralph Goullet & Alec Gray
- 1936 - Harold Rumney & Jack Lyngcoln
- 1937 - 1938: Ernie Hart & Jack Lyncoln
- 1939 - 1941: Billy Libbis
- 1942 - 1944: In recess – WWII
- 1945 - Tom Wallis
- 1946 - Jack Barker
- 1947 - Douglas Nicholls
- 1948 - Bill Faul
- 1949 - Jack O'Keefe
- 1951 - 1952: Bill Deans
- 1953 - 1956: Bill Faul
- 1957 - 1958: Jack Gervasoni
- 1959 - 1961: Peter O'Donohue
- 1962 - Neil Doolan

== Notable players ==
- Carlton – Frank Seymour
- Collingwood – Peter McKenna, Ian McOrist, Jack Regan
- Essendon – Greg Stockdale
- Fitzroy – Jack Gervasoni, Len Pye, Douglas Nicholls
- Footscray – Bill Downie, 1938 VFA Recorder Cup winner. Died in 1943 as a POW
- Melbourne – Bob Johnson
- Richmond – Stan Judkins
