= Motordrome (Melbourne) =

Former Australian rules football ground and speedway

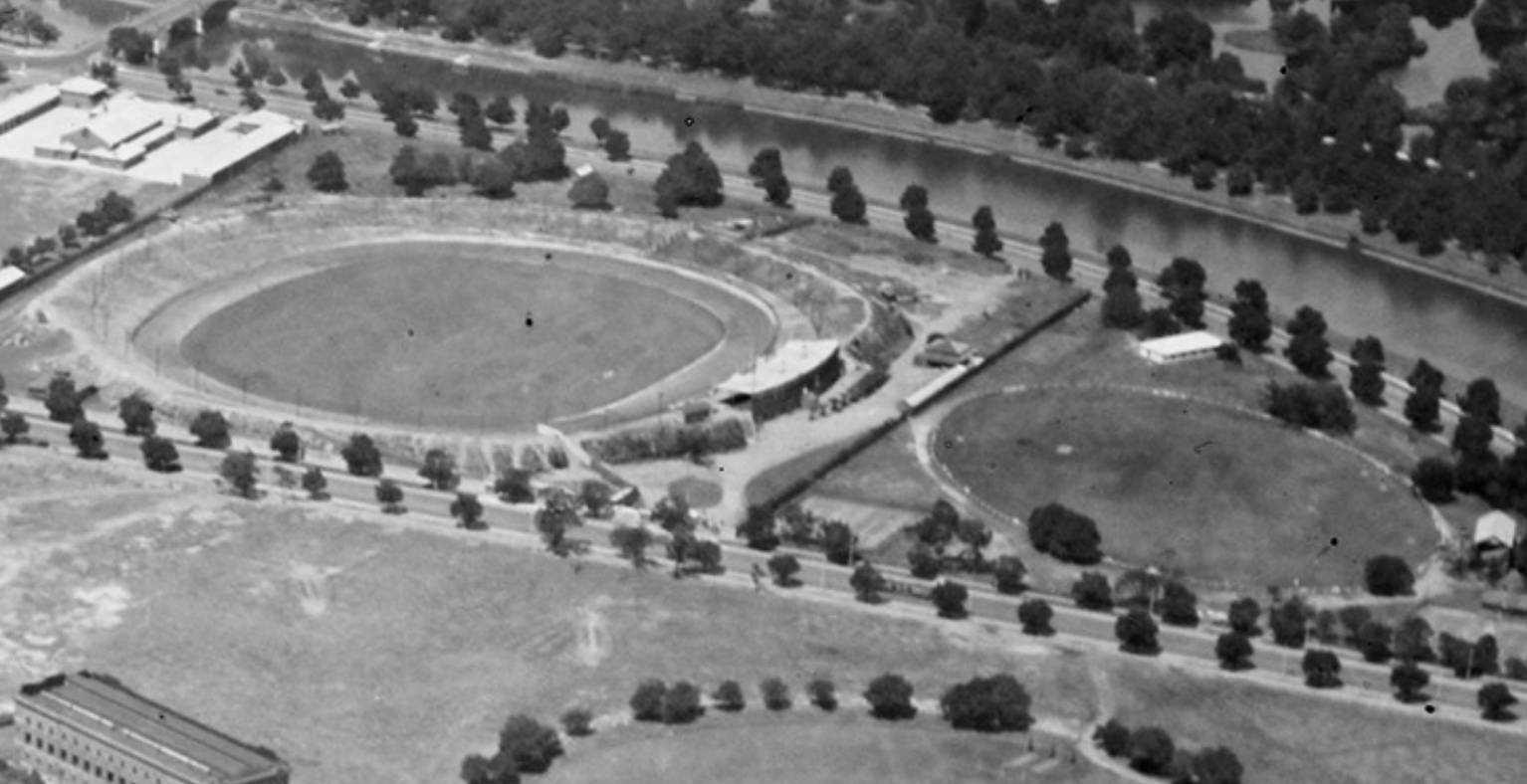
- Interactive map of Motordrome
- Former names: Olympic Park Speedway, Melbourne Speedway, Victorian Speedway
- Location: Olympic Park, Batman Avenue, Melbourne, Victoria
- Coordinates: 37°49′29″S 144°58′52″E
- Owner: Melbourne Carnivals Pty Ltd
- Capacity: 15,000 for football, 32,000 for racing.
- Surface: Grass (oval)/Concrete (raceway)

Construction
- Opened: 1924
- Closed: 1951
- Demolished: 1951

The Motordrome, also known as the Olympic Park Speedway, the Melbourne Speedway or the Victorian Speedway, was an Australian rules football ground and speedway located approximately on the site of the present day Melbourne Rectangular Stadium in Olympic Park in Melbourne, Victoria. The ground was primarily a speedway track, but also hosted football matches.

== History ==
Melbourne Carnivals Pty. Ltd, a company established in 1923 by Jack Campbell and Jim DuFrocq, developed and leased a large site known as the Amateur Sports Ground from the Crown with the help of local entrepreneur John Wren. On the site, the Motordrome was constructed. The stadium contained a grassed oval suitable for football, set inside a saucer-shaped concrete oval track suitable for motor racing; the track was a third of a mile long and banked at a 46° angle. Although Melbourne Carnivals originally had visions for the stadium to accommodate 100,000 spectators, it was ultimately built to accommodate around 32,000. The Motordrome was opened on 29 November 1924, and 32,000 spectators attended the inaugural race meeting.

In 1933, the ageing concrete surface of the motor racing track was no longer suitable for the higher powered vehicles which used it, so it was demolished and replaced with a dirt track which continued to be used for motor racing. In the same year, the Amateur Sports Ground was renamed Olympic Park, and the name was generally used for both the former Motordrome stadium, and the wider park in which it was situated. The name change had no connection to the Olympic Games – Melbourne was not selected as the host of the 1956 Summer Olympics until 1949 – and rather was chosen because the former name 'Amateur Sports Ground' no longer reflected the class and type of sport which was now played on the grounds.

The complex was sold after the Second World War and began to be converted into the Olympic Park Stadium used during the 1956 Olympics.

=== Motor racing ===
During the time of the Great Depression the ground regularly drew in crowds of more than 30,000 to watch speedway, motorcycle and sidecar racing. It is generally acknowledged that the first Speedcar race in Australia took place at the speedway in 1934.

In 1936/37, the speedway also saw two Motorcycle speedway test matches between the Australians, including future (1938) Speedway World Champion Bluey Wilkinson, taking on the visiting Americans who included the 1937 World Champion Jack Milne and his younger brother Cordy, as well as Wilbur Lamoreaux who would finish second behind Milne in the 1937 World Final at the Empire Stadium in London (Cordy Milne would finish third). Australia won the first test 31–23 on 19 December 1936, and won the third test 30–24 on 23 January 1937 (the second test, won 29-24 by Australia, was held at the Sydney Showground on 28 December).

=== Football ===
Although not much top-level football was played on the Motordrome, its presence as a high-capacity, centrally located ground had a significant off-field impact on football during the 1920s and 1930s.

When the venue was first established in 1924, the Victorian Football League was very keen for strategic reasons to control it. Melbourne Carnivals had offered to lease the ground to the new Public Service Football Club if it were admitted to the League in 1925. This offer became the trigger for off-field negotiations which ultimately saw Footscray, Hawthorn and North Melbourne admitted to the VFL, but saw the VFL fail to secure the use of the Motordrome. There had been proposals for the Richmond Football Club to move to the venue, or for it to be used as a neutral venue to which each club moved one or two of its home matches each year; however, these proposals fell through. The Victorian Football Association went on to play its finals matches at the venue in 1925, 1926 and 1927.

Prior to the 1931 season, the VFL and the Grounds Management Association (which represented the operators of most of the VFL grounds) entered a dispute over the use of the grounds for football matches, covering financial arrangements and the demarcation between the football and cricket seasons. During the dispute, the VFL arranged for the Motordrome, as well as the Exhibition Oval, to host twelve games which were to be transferred away from the grounds involved in the dispute, but the dispute was ultimately resolved through arbitration in March and the games were transferred back to their original grounds.

Then in 1932, the VFA signed a deal to use the Motordrome as a neutral central venue from 1933 until 1940. Under the agreement, the VFA would play one match at the ground each weekend during the season, with each club moving one or two of its home games to the ground each year, as well as playing the finals there. This caused a massive dispute with the local councils which owned the VFA's suburban grounds, and it culminated in seven of the VFA's twelve clubs being kicked out of their local grounds until the agreement was rescinded, almost ruining the 1934 VFA season and potentially forcing those clubs to disband or secede en masse from the VFA. The agreement was rescinded shortly before the season began.

The Richmond Football Club formally announced its intentions to move its home base from the Punt Road Oval to Olympic Park prior to the 1936 season, owing mostly to an ongoing dispute with the Richmond Cricket Club. Richmond's proposal to move was ultimately voted down by the VFL, but only by the casting vote of VFL president William McClelland.

The only VFL premiership football ever played at the venue occurred during the early part of 1932, when Melbourne played three home matches there because the Melbourne Cricket Ground was being resurfaced.

In the 1935 pre-season, the venue staged a night match under electric floodlights between 1934 VFL Grand Finalists Richmond and South Melbourne. The players had some visibility problems, mostly with depth perception, but the match attracted 25,000 spectators. Further exhibition night matches were played at the end of 1935 between VFA Grand Finalists Yarraville and Camberwell, and at the end of 1936 between combined teams representing the VFL and VFA.

School and junior football was regularly played on the venue.

=== Other ===
On 11 December 1926, the venue hosted a shambolic ostrich racing event. A full program of races was scheduled, but the event was cancelled after three farcical attempts at races – in which startled ostriches ridden by inanimate jockeys ran in opposite directions, and ostriches attached to sulkies failed to break out of a walk.
