= Alec Gray (footballer) =

Australian rules footballer and coach

Personal information
- Full name: Alexander Leonard Gray
- Born: 12 May 1891
- Died: 26 July 1945 (aged 54)
- Original team: Leopold
- Height: 180 cm (5 ft 11 in)
- Weight: 68 kg (150 lb)
- Position: Defender

Playing career^{1}
Years	Club	Games (Goals)
1914–15, 1919–21	Melbourne	52 (0)
- ^{1} Playing statistics correct to the end of 1921.

Alexander Leonard Gray (12 May 1891 – 26 July 1945) was an Australian rules footballer who played with Melbourne in the Victorian Football League (VFL).

Gray, a full-back, came to the Melbourne Football Club from Leopold. He made 16 appearances in his debut VFL season and seven more, including a Semi Final, before the war interrupted his career after 1915. Gray resumed at Melbourne in 1919 but the club had a poor year and he experienced a loss in each of his 13 games.
