= Frank Seymour =

Australian rules footballer (1904–1987)

Personal information
- Born: 14 May 1904; Carlton, Victoria
- Died: 7 May 1987 (aged 82); Portland, Victoria
- Original team: Mulwala
- Height: 180 cm (5 ft 11 in)
- Weight: 75 kg (165 lb)

Playing career^{1}
Years	Club	Games (Goals)
1927–1928	Carlton	6 (8)
1935	Fitzroy	5 (9)
1928-1939	Northcote	203 (882)
Total		214 (899)
- ^{1} Playing statistics correct to the end of 1935.

Frank Seymour (14 May 1904 – 7 May 1987) was an Australian rules footballer who played with Carlton and Fitzroy in the VFL and Northcote in the VFA.

== Family ==
The son of unmarried mother Florence Bassett, Frank Seymour Bassett was born at Carlton on 14 May 1904. He later dropped the Bassett name and was known as Frank Seymour.

Seymour married Lilian May Fraser (1904–1979) in Albury in 1927.

== Football ==
Seymour was a full-forward and was recruited from New South Wales to join Carlton in the 1927 season. After two seasons with Carlton, he moved to Northcote where he became a prolific goalkicker, and topped the VFA's goal kicking with over 100 goals in three separate seasons; 1930 - 110, 1932 - 109 (122), 1934 - 122 goals

He played 201 games for the club, and was one of three players to play in all five of Northcote's top division premiership teams (1929, 1932, 1933, 1934 and 1936). His career tally of 880 goals was the Northcote record when the club folded in 1987, and was a VFA record until 1962 when it was broken by Bob Bonnett.
