= 1963 VFA season =

Division 1
- Teams: 10
- Premiers: Moorabbin; 2nd D1 premiership
- Minor premiers: Moorabbin; 3rd D1 minor premiership

Division 2
- Teams: 9
- Premiers: Preston; 1st D2 premiership
- Minor premiers: Waverley; 1st D2 minor premiership

The 1963 Victorian Football Association season was the 82nd season of the top division of the Australian rules football competition, and the third season of its second division. The Division 1 premiership was won by the Moorabbin Football Club, after it defeated Sandringham in the Grand Final on 21 September by 64 points; it was Moorabbin's second and last VFA premiership, before its suspension from the Association prior to the following season. The Division 2 premiership was won by Preston; it was the club's first premiership in either division since joining the Association.

== Association membership ==
On 12 December 1962, the Geelong West Football Club was admitted to Division 2 of the Association. Geelong West had a long and successful history prior to World War II in the Geelong & District Football League, then since 1946 in the higher standard Ballarat Football League; but, after 1962 they were encouraged by leave by the Ballarat clubs, who did not like the lower home crowds and the long travelling distances that came with the Geelong-based team in their league; so, Geelong West sought out the VFA, which was prepared to admit the club. Geelong West played its games at the Western Oval in Church Street. It was the first time an Association club had been based in Geelong since 1927. Geelong West's admission brought the size of the Association to nineteen clubs, the highest to that stage in Association history.

The Association had already released its Division 2 fixture for 1963, so Geelong West's admission forced the fixture to be re-drawn. The Association intentionally fixtured Geelong West to play home on weekends when the Geelong VFL team was playing away, to maximise potential attendances.

== Scheduling of finals ==
The Division 1 Grand Final was scheduled for the Saturday prior to the VFL Grand Final^{Note 1}; this was a break from the established tradition, which had every Grand Final since 1939 scheduled for the weekend after the VFL Grand Final. This change of scheduling also forced a change of venue from the St Kilda Cricket Ground, which had hosted all VFA finals since 1945: because the VFA first semi-final now clashed with the final round of VFL home-and-home matches, the St Kilda Cricket Ground would still be in active use as the home ground of the VFL's St Kilda Football Club. As such, the entire Division 1 finals series was played at North Port Oval.

In Division 2, the Board of Management agreed that all finals were to be played on Sundays at Toorak Park; this was different from previous years, when the finals were played on Sunday only with the agreement of the clubs involved. Waverley was one of four clubs opposed to Sunday football, and it appealed to the Association to play its finals on Saturdays, but its requests were rejected.

The promotion-relegation challenge match between the Division 2 runners-up and the 9th placed team in Division 1 was abandoned from the 1963 season. As such, only the Division 2 premier was promoted, and only the Division 1 wooden spooner was relegated.

== Division 1 ==
The Division 1 home-and-home season was played over 18 rounds; the top four then contested the finals under the Page–McIntyre system.

=== Ladder ===
1963 VFA Division 1 Ladder
Pos	Team	Pld	W	L	D	PF	PA	PP	Pts
1	Moorabbin (P)	18	13	5	0	1441	1083	133.1	52
2	Sandringham	18	12	6	0	1805	1486	121.5	48
3	Coburg	18	12	6	0	1569	1373	114.3	48
4	Yarraville	18	12	6	0	1468	1297	113.2	48
5	Port Melbourne	18	10	8	0	1496	1399	106.9	40
6	Oakleigh	18	10	8	0	1394	1374	101.5	40
7	Dandenong	18	6	11	1	1379	1429	96.5	26
8	Williamstown	18	6	11	1	1227	1387	88.5	26
9	Brunswick	18	6	12	0	1354	1569	86.3	24
10	Northcote	18	2	16	0	952	1796	53.0	8

Rules for classification: 1) points; 2) percentage; 3) number of points for.
(P) Premiers

=== Finals ===
	Semi-finals
Saturday, 31 August	Coburg 14.20 (104)	def. by	Yarraville 16.15 (111)	North Port Oval (crowd: 8,000)
Saturday, 7 September	Moorabbin 14.14 (98)	def.	Sandringham 13.11 (89)	North Port Oval (crowd: 9,000)

	Preliminary Final
Saturday, 14 September	Sandringham 17.11 (113)	def.	Yarraville 10.13 (73)	North Port Oval (crowd: 10,000)

1963 VFA Division 1 Grand Final
Saturday, 21 September	Moorabbin	def.	Sandringham	North Port Oval (crowd: 15,000)
5.5 (35); 8.8 (56); 15.10 (100); 19.16 (130)	Q1; Q2; Q3; Final	2.1 (13); 4.4 (28); 5.9 (39); 9.12 (66)	Umpires: A. O'Neill
Papley 6, Kee 4, Whalebone 4, Burns 2, Christie 2, Ryan	Goals	Gleeson 2, O'Toole 2, Perovic 2, Wills 2, Strachan
Hoy (leg)	Injuries

=== Awards ===
- The leading goalkicker for the season was Robert Evans (Yarraville), who kicked 47 goals during the home-and-home season.
- The J. J. Liston Trophy was won by John Clegg (Yarraville), who polled 46 votes. Clegg was a comfortable winner over his Yarraville captain Don Whitten, who polled 28 votes, and Ian Abrahams (Dandenong), who polled 26 votes.
- Brunswick won the seconds premiership. Brunswick 11.11 (77) defeated Coburg 11.10 (76) in the Grand Final, played as a curtain-raiser to the firsts Grand Final on 21 September.

== Division 2 ==
The Division 2 home-and-home season was played over 16 rounds; the top four then contested the finals under the Page–McIntyre system.

=== Ladder ===
1963 VFA Division 2 Ladder
Pos	Team	Pld	W	L	D	PF	PA	PP	Pts
1	Waverley	16	12	4	0	1459	934	156.2	48
2	Preston (P)	16	12	4	0	1390	996	139.6	48
3	Sunshine	16	10	6	0	1167	1134	102.9	40
4	Prahran	16	9	6	1	1338	1103	121.3	38
5	Box Hill	16	9	6	1	1103	1078	102.3	38
6	Mordialloc	16	8	8	0	1443	1196	120.7	32
7	Camberwell	16	5	11	0	1078	1303	82.7	20
8	Geelong West	16	3	13	0	889	1474	60.3	12
9	Brighton–Caulfield	16	3	13	0	941	1567	60.1	12

Rules for classification: 1) points; 2) percentage; 3) number of points for.
(P) Premiers

=== Finals ===
	Semi-finals
Sunday, 25 August	Sunshine 10.4 (64)	def. by	Prahran 10.17 (77)	Toorak Park (crowd: 5,000)
Sunday, 1 September	Waverley 13.12 (90)	def.	Preston 12.10 (82)	Toorak Park (crowd: 8,000)

	Preliminary Final
Sunday, 8 September	Preston 15.16 (106)	def.	Prahran 11.6 (72)	Toorak Park (crowd: 6,000)

1963 VFA Division 2 Grand Final
Sunday, 15 September	Waverley	def. by	Preston	Toorak Park (crowd: 15,000)
3.6 (24); 4.7 (31); 9.15 (69); 9.15 (69)	Q1; Q2; Q3; Final	1.3 (9); 5.7 (37); 6.9 (45); 11.14 (80)	Umpires: C. Mance
Angus 2, McKindley 2, Scott 2, Ingwersen, Nash, Nation	Goals	Mills 5, Murnane 3, Parris 2, Waddell
Injuries	Cataggio (leg)

=== Awards ===
- The leading goalkicker for Division 2 was Frank Power (Mordialloc), who kicked 74 goals during the season.
- The Division 2 Best and Fairest was won by Dick Perry (Geelong West), who polled 45 votes; standing at 5'4", Perry was the smallest player in the Association at the time. Ray Besanko (Mordialloc) was second with 31 votes, and Larry Rowe (Brighton–Caulfield) was third with 27 votes.
- Camberwell won the seconds premiership. Camberwell 7.11 (53) defeated Sunshine 5.9 (39) in the Grand Final, played as a stand-alone match on Saturday, 7 September at Box Hill City Oval. It was Camberwell's first premiership in any of the VFA's three grades since joining the competition in 1926.

== Notable events ==
- At the recommendation of new coach Ian Thorogood, Waverley adopted Panthers as its nickname at the start of the season. Waverley had spent around £100 on signage, letterheads, etc. to promote the nickname before it was realised that Sunshine had adopted Panthers as its nickname in 1962 – Sunshine had not promoted the nickname as aggressively as Waverley, but had invested in some clothing bearing the new mascot. Sunshine ultimately abandoned the Panthers nickname, and became known as the Crows instead.
- Following an argument at a committee meeting on 3 June, Moorabbin senior coach Bob Wilkie and seconds coach John Hirst resigned their positions. Two days later, thirds coach Graham Dunscombe was appointed senior coach, and Hirst apologised to the committee and was reinstated as seconds coach. Despite this off-field instability, Moorabbin was able to win the minor and major premierships for the season.

== See also ==
- List of VFA/VFL premiers

== Footnotes ==
1. Based on the original schedule; as it actually happened, the VFL postponed its Round 11 due to rain, so there ended up being a two-week gap between the two competitions‘ Grand Finals.
