= 1968 VFA season =

Division 1
- Teams: 10
- Premiers: Preston; 1st D1 premiership
- Minor premiers: Preston; 1st D1 minor premiership

Division 2
- Teams: 10
- Premiers: Geelong West; 2nd D2 premiership
- Minor premiers: Williamstown; 1st D2 minor premiership

The 1968 Victorian Football Association season was the 87th season of the top division of the Australian rules football competition, and the eighth season of second division competition. The Division 1 premiership was won by the Preston Football Club, after it defeated Prahran in the Grand Final on 22 September by 14 points; it was Preston's first Division 1 premiership. The Division 2 premiership was won by Geelong West.

== Division 1 ==
The Division 1 home-and-home season was played over 18 rounds; the top four then contested the finals under the Page–McIntyre system. The finals were held at the Punt Road Oval, in Richmond.

=== Ladder ===
1968 VFA Division 1 Ladder
Pos	Team	Pld	W	L	D	PF	PA	PP	Pts
1	Preston (P)	18	15	3	0	1648	1288	128.0	60
2	Prahran	18	13	5	0	1651	1294	127.6	52
3	Sandringham	18	12	6	0	1762	1435	122.8	48
4	Dandenong	18	11	6	1	1601	1315	121.7	46
5	Port Melbourne	18	10	7	1	1702	1480	115.0	42
6	Yarraville	18	9	9	0	1743	1749	99.7	36
7	Waverley	18	9	9	0	1400	1436	97.5	36
8	Brunswick	18	4	14	0	1370	1780	77.0	16
9	Oakleigh	18	4	14	0	1253	1762	71.1	16
10	Coburg	18	2	16	0	1149	1744	65.9	8

Rules for classification: 1) points; 2) percentage; 3) number of points for.
(P) Premiers

=== Finals ===
	Semi-finals
Sunday, 1 September	Sandringham 20.13 (133)	def.	Dandenong 11.19 (85)	Punt Road Oval
Sunday, 8 September	Preston 13.17 (95)	def. by	Prahran 18.15 (123)	Punt Road Oval

	Preliminary Final
Sunday, 15 September	Preston 22.11 (143)	def.	Sandringham 18.7 (115)	Punt Road Oval

1968 VFA Division 1 Grand Final
Sunday, 22 September	Prahran	def. by	Preston	Punt Road Oval (crowd: 18,000)
2.3 (15); 7.9 (51); 10.10 (70); 12.12 (84)	Q1; Q2; Q3; Final	4.3 (27); 8.4 (52); 12.7 (79); 15.8 (98)	Umpires: Alan O'Neill
Power 6, Bartlett 3, Payne 2, Rose	Goals	Joyce 5, Dalton 3, Lempriere 2, Weston 2, Corbett, Heard, Reid

=== Awards ===
- The leading goalkicker for the season was Jim Miller (Dandenong), who kicked 72 goals in the home-and-away season and 77 overall.
- The J. J. Liston Trophy was won by Dick Telford (Preston), who polled 31 votes. Telford finished ahead of Norm Luff (Oakleigh), who finished second with 26 votes; Brian Vaughan and John Ward (both of Sandringham) were equal third with 21 votes.
- Port Melbourne won the seconds premiership. Port Melbourne 16.14 (110) defeated Sandringham 10.17 (77) in the Grand Final, played as a stand-alone match on Saturday 21 September at Skinner Reserve.

== Division 2 ==
The Division 2 home-and-home season was played over seventeen rounds; the top four then contested the finals under the Page–McIntyre system.

=== Ladder ===
1968 VFA Division 2 Ladder
Pos	Team	Pld	W	L	D	PF	PA	PP	Pts
1	Williamstown	17	15	1	1	1911	1009	189.4	62
2	Geelong West (P)	17	14	3	0	1952	1441	135.5	56
3	Sunshine	17	11	5	1	1634	1158	141.1	46
4	Werribee	17	11	6	0	1417	1442	98.3	44
5	Northcote	17	9	8	0	1391	1435	96.9	36
6	Frankston	17	8	9	0	1599	1594	100.3	32
7	Caulfield	17	5	12	0	1382	1682	82.2	20
8	Mordialloc	17	4	13	0	1250	1672	74.8	16
9	Camberwell	17	4	13	0	1219	1925	63.3	16
10	Box Hill	17	3	14	0	1214	1611	75.4	12

Rules for classification: 1) points; 2) percentage; 3) number of points for.
(P) Premiers

=== Finals ===
	Semi-finals
Sunday, 11 August	Sunshine 13.24 (102)	def.	Werribee 10.11 (71)	Yarraville Oval
Sunday, 11 August	Williamstown 19.18 (132)	def.	Geelong West 19.11 (125)	Toorak Park (crowd: 8,000)

	Preliminary Final
Sunday, 18 August	Geelong West 17.12 (114)	def.	Sunshine 11.18 (84)	Toorak Park

1968 VFA Division 2 Grand Final
Sunday, 25 August	Williamstown	def. by	Geelong West	Toorak Park (crowd: 6,000)
4.3 (27); 11.8 (74); 15.11 (101); 18.15 (123)	Q1; Q2; Q3; Final	4.3 (27); 10.6 (66); 14.12 (96); 20.15 (135)	Umpires: O'Neill
Ware 4, Camilleri 3, Mulligan 3, Barnes 2, Papley 2, Szyszka 2, Patterson, Raffle	Goals	W. Adams 5, Harris 3, Tenabel 3, Deeath 2, Emond 2, Stacey 2, Brushfield, Gibbons, Skowronksi
Mulligan, for striking an unknown player in the second quarter Mulligan, for striking Keys in the second quarter Johnson, for striking Skowronski in the third quarter	Reports	Snell, for striking Papley in the first quarter

=== Awards ===
- The leading goalkicker for Division 2 was Eddie Szyszka (Williamstown), who kicked 57 goals in the home-and-away season, and 61 goals overall.
- The Division 2 Best and Fairest was won by Ian Nankervis (Williamstown), who polled 30 votes. Geoff Bryant (Box Hill) finished in second place with 28 votes; David Harris (Geelong West) was third with 23 votes.
- Northcote won the seconds premiership. Northcote 17.11 (113) defeated Sunshine 10.15 (75) in the Grand Final, held as a stand-alone match on Saturday 31 August at Skinner Reserve.

== Notable events ==
=== Interstate matches ===
The Association contested two interstate matches during 1968. Keith Burns (Brunswick) captained the team against Canberra, and Max Papley (Williamstown) captained the team against Tasmania.

As a consequence of the Association's expulsion from the ANFC in 1969/70, these were the last representative matches played by the Association until 1975.

	1968 Interstate Matches
Sunday, 26 May	Canberra 6.15 (51)	def. by	Victoria (VFA) 21.16 (142)	Manuka Oval (crowd: 3,000)
Saturday, 29 June	Tasmania 18.8 (116)	def. by	Victoria (VFA) 19.15 (129)	York Park (crowd: 10,688)

=== Other notable events ===
- Following his win in the Division 2 Best and Fairest award, Ian Nankervis immediately sought a pay rise from the Williamstown Football Club; the request which was rejected, and the club omitted him from the Grand Final team for his disloyalty. Williamstown lost the Grand Final by twelve points, and has since been left to speculate whether dropping its best player cost it the flag. He moved to Dandenong Football Club in 1969.

== See also ==
- List of VFA/VFL premiers
