= 1965 VFA season =

Division 1
- Teams: 10
- Premiers: Waverley; 1st D1 premiership
- Minor premiers: Dandenong; 1st D1 minor premiership

Division 2
- Teams: 9
- Premiers: Preston; 2nd D2 premiership
- Minor premiers: Preston; 2nd D2 minor premiership

Attendance
- Matches played: 170
- Total attendance: 432,000

The 1965 VFA season was the 84th season of the top division of the Victorian Football Association (VFA), and the fifth season of second division competition.

The Division 1 premiership was won by the Waverley Football Club, after it defeated Port Melbourne in the Grand Final on 26 September by twelve points; it was the first and only premiership ever won by Waverley in either division in its time in the Association, and it came in only its second season in Division 1. The Division 2 premiership was won by Preston; it was the club's second Division 2 premiership in three years, having competed in and been relegated from Division 1 in the intervening year.

== Grounds ==
In the early 1960s, several Victorian Football League clubs were interested in leaving their traditional home grounds, and many were looking at Association grounds as possible new homes. The first successful move occurred in 1964, when League club St Kilda brokered a deal with the Moorabbin Council to move its playing and training base to the Moorabbin Football Club's home ground, Moorabbin Oval; it had sought a new ground which it could manage free from the direction of a district cricket club and in a growing suburb whence it could attract new fans. The move was a success for St Kilda, but resulted in Moorabbin being suspended from the Association.

St Kilda's success motivated other League clubs to seek new grounds, and in 1965 there were two plays by League clubs for Association grounds: North Melbourne moved to Coburg Oval, a move which ultimately lasted less than one year, but nearly cost Coburg its place in the Association; and, Footscray attempted unsuccessfully to move to Skinner Reserve, Sunshine's newly developed ground.

=== North Melbourne's move to Coburg Oval ===
On 25 June 1964, three months after St Kilda's move to Moorabbin was first announced, it was revealed that the Coburg Council had approached the North Melbourne Football Club, and that they were discussing terms for the club to relocate its operations to Coburg Oval on a long-term lease. The ground was one of the best in the Association at the time, and the Coburg Council had ambitions of seeing League football played on it. North Melbourne was keen to leave the North Melbourne Cricket Ground in Arden Street, which had been its home since the 19th century, because low population density in the surrounding industrial area and isolation from public transport were stifling its ability to attract fans, and a relocation to Coburg offered advantages in both of these areas.

The loss of its ground would have meant expulsion from the Association, so from the time the move was first announced, the Coburg Football Club was staunchly opposed to the council's actions, and vowed to fight the move. Coburg examined a number of legal options, and appealed unsuccessfully to force a referendum of ratepayers. Coburg had many allies: the Association did not want to see another of its best grounds lost to the League; the Australian National Football Council did not want to see a newly vacant North Melbourne ground lost to another code; and the League's Carlton Football Club was opposed to the invasion of its territory – most of Coburg, including the ground itself, was in Carlton's recruiting zone (only West Coburg was in North Melbourne's territory), and 25% of Carlton's members lived in the area.

In November 1964, the council and club began working on terms for a 40-year lease, under which the council would spend £80,000 to bring the venue to League standards, and North Melbourne would serve as ground manager, pay £4,000 per year in rent, and £50,000 for upgrades over thirty years. The council sought to formalise the deal through a controversial request for tender which effectively precluded anybody but North Melbourne from applying by stipulating that applicants "must play Australian rules football within the framework of the Victorian Football League"; it dropped the requirement that applicants play in the League after it was criticised as unethical, but the point was moot as Coburg Football Club's rent offer of £200 per year had no chance of competing with North Melbourne's £4,000 per year. The council gave its formal approval for a lease by a narrow 6–5 majority on 11 January 1965, and North Melbourne took occupancy on a week-to-week basis from 1 February, while the lease was finalized. Over the following months, the terms of the lease were renegotiated, and when the lease was formally signed on 2 April 1965, it was for a term of only seven years, much shorter than the forty-year terms which had initially been discussed.

The League itself leased the North Melbourne Cricket Ground for £1,500 during 1965, and used it junior football, umpire training, school programs, and from June it was used as a central ground for the Essendon District Football League game-of-the-week.

==== Proposed amalgamation between North Melbourne and Coburg ====
By December 1964, it looked unlikely that Coburg would be able to continue in the Association. The council offered the club Morris Reserve to use as a home ground, but it was not up to Association standards, and the Association would not allow the club to share Coburg Oval with North Melbourne, leaving the club without a ground; and, money spent on legal costs from fighting the move, coupled with a lack of support from the public, had the club in a poor financial situation. Because of the bleak outlook, the club began to discuss the possibility of amalgamating with North Melbourne – a move which the Association warned would likely result in its suspension, as had occurred to Moorabbin eight months earlier.

On 8 December, Coburg and North Melbourne agreed to terms for an amalgamation. Under the agreement:

- Five Coburg committeemen would join the main North Melbourne committee, with two taking their places immediately; other Coburg committeemen would run the North Melbourne reserves and social club
- Three Coburg committeemen would join the North Melbourne committee in charge of ground control, with some key Coburg Football Club memorabilia such as honour boards and pennants to be preserved and maintained at the ground
- Coburg life members would receive North Melbourne season tickets
- All Coburg players would be invited to North Melbourne pre-season training for the opportunity to win places on the club's senior list

One week later, North Melbourne agreed to amend its constitution to facilitate the amalgamation. Fourteen Coburg committeemen transferred to North Melbourne over the following months, and all were suspended from the Association.

The Coburg committee had been divided on the decision to amalgamate with North Melbourne, and on 17 December, the Association executive helped to facilitate the formation of a new Coburg committee from ten committeemen and fourteen life members who were opposed to the amalgamation. The new committee and the Association both refused to recognise the amalgamation, and worked to keep Coburg in the Association for the 1965 season. It was unclear in December whether or not they would succeed in fielding a team, and the Association did not include Coburg in its initial 1965 fixture, released on 18 December; but, by February the club and the Association had confirmed that Coburg would field a team in 1965. In March, arrangements were made for Coburg to share North Port Oval with Port Melbourne for senior games during 1965, with the seconds to play at Lagoon Reserve, Port Melbourne. Through the season, there was a political struggle between the two Coburg committees, each rejecting the other's legitimacy, and the office-bearers of the former committee refused to turn club documents over to the new committee.

==== End of the lease ====
Under the terms of the lease, the Coburg Council was committed to building a grandstand for at least £75,000 prior to 1966; but by the end of 1965, the council was deterred by its weak financial position, negative sentiment towards the investment amongst ratepayers, poorer financial returns from North Melbourne matches during the season than expected, and the fact that the seven-year lease provided less certainty of a return on any infrastructure investment than the 40-year lease which was initially negotiated. After discussions, both the council and the football club decided that it was in neither's best interests to continue the arrangement, and on 28 September 1965 the lease was terminated by mutual agreement after only eight months of the seven-year term.

The Coburg Football Club, which had been making an effort to find a new permanent home ground and had suffered on-field and financially during its season at Port Melbourne, was able to return to Coburg Oval from the 1966 season. North Melbourne returned to the North Melbourne Cricket Ground in 1966, turning down an offer from the St Kilda Cricket Club to move to the St Kilda Cricket Ground; the terms of its new agreement with the Melbourne City Council were less favourable for the club than its previous agreement.

=== Footscray's attempted move to Skinner Reserve ===
In 1964, the Sunshine Council agreed to lease Sunshine's home ground, Selwyn Park, to the George Cross soccer club. To secure agreement from the football club to end its existing lease early, the Sunshine Council committed to developing a new Association standard venue at Skinner Reserve in Braybrook. The venue was built during the 1965 season, with the football club signing a seven-year lease to begin from 1966.

In July 1965, before the venue was finished, the League's Footscray Football Club made an application to the Sunshine Council to permanently move its playing and administrative base from Western Oval to Skinner Reserve, and to develop it further to a League standard venue. As had been the case for Coburg and Moorabbin, Sunshine's place in the Association would have been in jeopardy if Footscray had made the move; but, in September the council formally decided to honour its existing agreement with the Sunshine, and rejected Footscray's application. Sunshine began playing at the new venue in 1966.

While Footscray's application at Braybrook was under consideration, Yarraville made an opportunistic application to the Footscray Council to replace Footscray at the Western Oval; this was also rejected once Footscray was confirmed to be staying.

=== Relationship with the League ===
St Kilda's and North Melbourne's moves into Association grounds damaged the relationship between the Association and the League. The Association was upset by what it had viewed as League takeovers at Moorabbin and Coburg; it also held the view that, under the reciprocity agreements between the two competitions, the League was compelled to recognise the suspensions meted out by the Association to Coburg committeemen who had moved to North Melbourne, but the League took no action against those men. As a result of this, on 9 April, the Association Board of Management voted by 27–9 majority to cease reciprocal recognition of League clearances, opening the door for League players to cross to the Association without a clearance. This state of affairs existed until June 1966, when the Australian National Football Council intervened; up until this time, only Eddie Melai, who transferred from South Melbourne to Dandenong, took the opportunity. However, disputes over clearances began again with the Association's imposition of transfer fees from 1967, and the disputes eventually culminated in the Association's expulsion from the Australian National Football Council in 1970.

== Association membership ==
In October 1964, the Association Board of Management voted to admit the Werribee Football Club to Division 2 of the Association. Werribee was a newly established senior club, formed from an amalgamation of four Werribee-based clubs which had competed in the Werribee District Football League: Werribee South, Irish National Foresters, Services and Metro Farm. The new club played its games at Chirnside Park.

Five other clubs had applied: Boronia, Chelsea, Frankston, Keilor and Ringwood. The Association had also been in favour of admitting Frankston, but the club failed to get a clearance from the Mornington Peninsula Football League, so was unable to make the move.

Immediately prior to the season, Brighton–Caulfield changed its name to Caulfield. The club stated that it wanted to appeal to and better represent its adopted home area at Caulfield, and that most of the former Brighton members and supporters had already drifted away from the club; but that under its hyphenated name its identity was still considered more strongly associated with Brighton. The club further severed its connection with Brighton's identity by adopting a new guernsey of white with navy blue hoops, and adopting Bears as a new nickname.

== Division 1 ==
The Division 1 home-and-home season was played over 18 rounds; the top four then contested the finals under the Page–McIntyre system.

Finals were held at North Port Oval; the preliminary and Grand Finals for Division 1 were both held on Sunday for the first time; the semi-finals, which were played while Division 2 was still playing, remained on Saturdays.

=== Ladder ===
1965 VFA Division 1 Ladder
Pos	Team	Pld	W	L	D	PF	PA	PP	Pts
1	Dandenong	18	13	5	0	1553	1189	130.6	52
2	Waverley (P)	18	13	5	0	1523	1222	124.6	52
3	Port Melbourne	18	12	6	0	1816	1118	162.4	48
4	Sandringham	18	12	6	0	1735	1347	128.8	48
5	Brunswick	18	12	6	0	1387	1324	104.8	48
6	Yarraville	18	9	9	0	1540	1659	92.8	36
7	Williamstown	18	7	11	0	1209	1384	87.4	28
8	Oakleigh	18	6	12	0	1204	1429	84.3	24
9	Coburg	18	3	15	0	1208	1821	66.3	12
10	Geelong West	18	3	15	0	1159	1809	64.1	12

Rules for classification: 1) points; 2) percentage; 3) number of points for.
(P) Premiers

=== Finals ===
	Semi-finals
Saturday, 4 September	Port Melbourne 15.17 (107)	def.	Sandringham 8.12 (60)	North Port Oval (crowd: 8,500)
Saturday, 11 September	Dandenong 8.10 (58)	def. by	Waverley 8.17 (65)	North Port Oval (crowd: 7,200)

	Preliminary Final
Sunday, 19 September	Dandenong 8.19 (67)	def. by	Port Melbourne 16.19 (115)	North Port Oval (crowd: 14,000)

1965 VFA Division 1 Grand Final
Sunday, 26 September	Waverley	def.	Port Melbourne	North Port Oval (crowd: 25,000)
1.4 (10); 4.8 (32); 10.10 (70); 14.13 (97)	Q1; Q2; Q3; Final	4.9 (33); 5.15 (45); 8.18 (66); 10.25 (85)	Umpires: Jim McMaster
Lawson 4, Merrett 3, Brenchley 2, Brewster 2, Petzke 2, Lockwood	Goals	Howell 4, Perry 3, Brownhill, Carlile, Milner

=== Awards ===
- The leading goalkicker for the season was Denis Oakley (Sandringham), who kicked 77 goals during the season.
- The J. J. Liston Trophy was won by Alan Poore (Waverley), who polled 28 votes. Ron Warwick (Yarraville) and Fred Robinson (Brunswick) were equal-second with 23 votes.
- Port Melbourne won the seconds premiership for the second year in a row. Port Melbourne 19.16 (130) defeated Brunswick 10.6 (66) in the Grand Final, played as a curtain-raiser to the firsts Grand Final on 26 September.

== Division 2 ==
The Division 2 home-and-home season was played over 18 rounds, with each team playing 16 games and having two byes; the top four then contested the finals under the Page–McIntyre system. All finals were played on Sundays at Toorak Park.

=== Ladder ===
1965 VFA Division 2 Ladder
Pos	Team	Pld	W	L	D	PF	PA	PP	Pts
1	Preston (P)	16	13	3	0	1927	982	196.2	52
2	Mordialloc	16	11	5	0	1593	1158	137.6	44
3	Northcote	16	11	5	0	1182	1155	102.3	34 (Note: 10 points deducted)
4	Sunshine	16	10	6	0	1443	1269	113.7	40
5	Prahran	16	8	7	1	1412	1381	102.2	34
6	Box Hill	16	6	8	2	1204	1434	84.0	28
7	Werribee	16	5	10	1	1169	1589	73.6	22
8	Camberwell	16	3	12	1	1124	1535	73.2	14
9	Caulfield	16	2	13	1	1099	1653	66.5	10

Rules for classification: 1) points; 2) percentage; 3) number of points for.
(P) Premiers

=== Finals ===
	Semi-finals
Sunday, 22 August	Northcote 14.15 (99)	def.	Sunshine 11.21 (87)	Toorak Park (crowd: 5,000)
Sunday, 29 August	Preston 13.18 (96)	def.	Mordialloc 12.9 (81)	Toorak Park (crowd: 5,000)

	Preliminary Final
Sunday, 5 September	Mordialloc 18.19 (127)	def.	Northcote 11.11 (77)	Toorak Park (crowd: 4,500)

1965 VFA Division 2 Grand Final
Sunday, 12 September	Preston	def.	Mordialloc	Toorak Park (crowd: 10,000)
2.1 (13); 6.4 (40); 12.6 (78); 15.12 (102)	Q1; Q2; Q3; Final	4.4 (28); 5.5 (35); 8.7 (55); 9.10 (64)	Umpires: O'Neil
Peterson 5, Walker 5, Cameron 2, McArthur 2, Jenkins	Goals	Morrison 4, Hynes 2, Baxter, O'Brien, Power
Jenkins (leg), Peterson (ankle)	Injuries

=== Awards ===
- The leading goalkicker for Division 2 was Johnny Walker (Preston), who kicked 108 goals in the home-and-home season and 116 goals overall.
- The Division 2 Best and Fairest was won by John Bradbury (Mordialloc), who polled 37 votes. Ray Murnane (Preston) was second with 26 votes, and Ian Cameron (Preston) and Hank Verwoert (Prahran) were equal-third with 22 votes.
- Prahran won the seconds premiership. Prahran 13.13 (91) defeated Preston 6.11 (47) in the Grand Final, played as a stand-alone match on Saturday, 4 September at Selwyn Park.

== Notable events ==
=== Interstate matches ===
The Association played two interstate matches during 1965, against Western Australia in Perth and against Tasmania in Melbourne. As in 1964, Williamstown's Gerry Callahan coached the team, and Sunshine's Shaun Crosbie was captain.

	1965 Interstate matches
Saturday, 12 June	Western Australia 12.17 (89)	def.	Victoria (VFA) 12.8 (80)	Subiaco Oval (crowd: 24,595)
Sunday, 18 July	Victoria (VFA) 12.11 (83)	def.	Tasmania 11.10 (76)	Toorak Park (crowd: 12,000)

=== Other notable events ===
- In an inauspicious start to its premiership season, Waverley was held scoreless in the first, second and final quarters of its first match of the season, ultimately losing 2.2 (14) def. by 12.7 (79) to Dandenong.
- Preston became the first club to have a player kick more than 100 goals in the season in each of the three grades of competition: Johnny Walker in the firsts, Des McDonald in the seconds and Ian Baggott in the thirds.

== See also ==
- List of VFA/VFL premiers
