= List of VFA/VFL minor premiers =

This is a complete chronological listing of the minor premiers of the VFA/VFL. This minor premiership is the title which is won by the team finishing on top of the ladder at the end of the home-and-away season in the Victorian Football League (known as the Victorian Football Association until 1995).

== Criteria ==
The team which finishes with the best record across the home-and-away season is awarded the minor premiership. This is determined by most premiership points, with four points for a win and two points for a draw; if tied, percentage (ratio of points scored to points conceded) is used as tie-breaker.

The minor premiership is distinct from the major premiership (or, simply, the premiership), which is awarded to the winner of the finals series which follows the home-and-away season. The VFA first established a finals series in 1903, and hence the first distinct minor premiership is recognised in that season.

== List of minor premiers ==
The following is a list of minor premiers, ladder details and results.

=== Division 1 ===
Season	Minor premier	Record	Pts	%	Second place	Margin	Finish
1903	Richmond (1)	16–2	64	204.6	North Melbourne	2 points	Runners-up
1904	Richmond (2)	15–2–1	62	175.9	Footscray	4 points	Runners-up
1905	North Melbourne (1)	15–3	60	173.8	Richmond	4 points	Runners-up
1906	West Melbourne (1)	14–3–1	58	195.3	Richmond	2 points	Premiers
1907	Williamstown (1)	15–3	60	160.2	Richmond	4 points	Premiers
1908	Footscray (1)	15–2–1	62	159.0	Essendon (A.)	8 points	Premiers
1909	Prahran (1)	16–2	64	154.7	Essendon (A.)	4 points	Runners-up
1910	North Melbourne (2)	15–2–1	62	213.3	Essendon (A.)	25.5%	Premiers
1911	Essendon (A.) (1)	16–2	64	176.5	North Melbourne	8 points	Premiers
1912	Footscray (2)	15–3	60	173.2	North Melbourne	33.3%	Runners-up
1913	Footscray (3)	14–4	56	155.1	North Melbourne	2 points	Premiers
1914	North Melbourne (3)	14–4	56	159.0	Footscray	17.8%	Premiers
1915	North Melbourne (4)	13–0	52	180.2	Brunswick	12 points	Premiers
1916	Season not contested						
1917	Season not contested						
1918	North Melbourne (5)	10–0	40	211.2	Prahran	16 points	Premiers
1919	North Melbourne (6)	18–0	72	227.3	Footscray	16 points	Runners-up
1920	Footscray (4)	16–2	64	151.4	Brunswick	8 points	Premiers
1921	Footscray (5)	16–1–1	66	149.7	Port Melbourne	6 points	Runners-up
1922	Footscray (6)	16–2	64	190.2	Port Melbourne	8 points	Runners-up
1923	Footscray (7)	16–2	64	168.2	Port Melbourne	2 points	Premiers
1924	Footscray (8)	16–1–1	66	161.8	Williamstown	14 points	Premiers
1925	Brunswick (1)	13–1	52	165.8	Northcote	8 points	Premiers
1926	Coburg (1)	15–3	60	171.5	Northcote	4 points	Premiers
1927	Coburg (2)	18–0	72	190.7	Brighton	16 points	Premiers
1928	Coburg (3)	15–3	60	165.6	Port Melbourne	4 points	Premiers
1929	Northcote (1)	17–5	68	149.9	Port Melbourne	16.0%	Premiers
1930	Oakleigh (1)	16–4	64	132.3	Northcote	4 points	Premiers
1931	Oakleigh (2)	14–4	56	147.9	Port Melbourne	10.2%	Premiers
1932	Northcote (2)	15–5	60	138.5	Coburg	6.7%	Premiers
1933	Northcote (3)	16–4	64	129.1	Coburg	6 points	Premiers
1934	Northcote (4)	14–4	56	141.7	Preston	14.7%	Premiers
1935	Northcote (5)	16–2	64	145.5	Yarraville	16 points	3rd
1936	Brunswick (2)	16–2	64	147.9	Prahran	6 points	3rd
1937	Brunswick (3)	12–4	48	125.7	Brighton	16.6%	Runners-up
1938	Brunswick (4)	15–1	60	143.3	Brighton	14 points	Premiers
1939	Prahran (2)	15–5	60	131.3	Brunswick	2.0%	3rd
1940	Williamstown (2)	16–4	64	135.8	Port Melbourne	8 points	3rd
1941	Port Melbourne (1)	16–4	64	145.3	Prahran	5.5%	Premiers
1942	Season not contested						
1943	Season not contested						
1944	Season not contested						
1945	Coburg (4)	20–0	80	184.8	Williamstown	12 points	3rd
1946	Camberwell (1)	15–4–1	62	125.0	Williamstown	4 points	Runners-up
1947	Port Melbourne (2)	16–5–1	66	119.2	Williamstown	2 points	Premiers
1948	Williamstown (3)	16–4	64	138.2	Brunswick	8.7%	Runners-up
1949	Williamstown (4)	16–5	64	122.4	Oakleigh	4 points	Premiers
1950	Oakleigh (3)	15–4	60	122.8	Port Melbourne	4 points	Premiers
1951	Port Melbourne (3)	16–3–1	66	153.4	Prahran	2 points	Runners-up
1952	Port Melbourne (4)	18–2	72	153.5	Coburg	8 points	Runners-up
1953	Port Melbourne (5)	18–2	72	196.0	Williamstown	6 points	Premiers
1954	Port Melbourne (6)	17–3	68	150.6	Williamstown	4 points	Runners-up
1955	Port Melbourne (7)	17–2–1	70	142.9	Preston	2 points	Runners-up
1956	Williamstown (5)	17–3	68	161.2	Port Melbourne	4 points	Premiers
1957	Williamstown (6)	20–0	80	184.1	Moorabbin	20 points	3rd
1958	Williamstown (7)	15–3	60	136.9	Moorabbin	4 points	Premiers
1959	Williamstown (8)	17–3	68	161.2	Sandringham	4 points	Premiers
1960	Sandringham (1)	15–3	60	226.4	Oakleigh	58.6%	Runners-up
1961	Moorabbin (1)	16–6	64	124.6	Yarraville	8 points	3rd
1962	Moorabbin (2)	14–4	56	140.8	Sandringham	2 points	Runners-up
1963	Moorabbin (3)	13–5	52	133.1	Sandringham	4 points	Premiers
1964	Williamstown (9)	14–4	56	114.4	Port Melbourne	4 points	Runners-up
1965	Dandenong	13–5	52	128.9	Waverley	5.3%	3rd
1966	Port Melbourne (8)	15–3	60	135.6	Waverley	8 points	Premiers
1967	Dandenong (2)	14–4	56	119.1	Port Melbourne	4 points	Premiers
1968	Preston (1)	15–3	60	128.0	Prahran	8 points	Premiers
1969	Preston (2)	17–1	68	153.3	Dandenong	12 points	Premiers
1970	Prahran (3)	15–3	60	134.6	Williamstown	8 points	Premiers
1971	Preston (3)	13–4–1	54	120.8	Dandenong	6 points	Runners-up
1972	Oakleigh (4)	13–5	52	119.2	Dandenong	6 points	Premiers
1973	Dandenong (3)	12–5–1	50	116.9	Oakleigh	2 points	3rd
1974	Port Melbourne (9)	13–5	52	127.3	Geelong West	2.5%	Premiers
1975	Geelong West (1)	15–3	60	133.1	Port Melbourne	4 points	Premiers
1976	Port Melbourne (10)	15–3	60	121.5	Preston	8 points	Premiers
1977	Port Melbourne (11)	15–3	60	124.2	Sandringham	8 points	Premiers
1978	Port Melbourne (12)	13–5	52	115.5	Preston	2 points	3rd
1979	Geelong West (2)	15-3	60	126.6	Coburg	12 points	Runners-up
1980	Coburg (5)	16–2	64	133.5	Port Melbourne	12 points	Runners-up
1981	Port Melbourne (13)	16–2	64	161.8	Preston	16 points	Premiers
1982	Preston (4)	16–2	64	155.8	Coburg	4 points	Runners-up
1983	Preston (5)	15–3	60	156.5	Geelong West	4 points	Premiers
1984	Preston (6)	16–2	64	163.5	Geelong West	4 points	Premiers
1985	Sandringham (2)	16–2	64	162.1	Coburg	18.0%	Premiers
1986	Coburg (6)	15–3	60	154.4	Frankston	8 points	Runners-up
1987	Port Melbourne (14)	14–4	56	130.2	Springvale	8 points	Runners-up
1988	Coburg (7)	13–5	52	135.7	Preston	8 points	Premiers
1989	Coburg (8)	17–1	68	180.2	Williamstown	10 points	Premiers
1990	Preston (7)	13–4–1	54	123.3	Springvale	2 points	3rd
1991	Werribee (1)	15–3	60	128.1	Dandenong	8 points	Runners-up
1992	Sandringham (3)	15–3	60	146.0	Williamstown	8 points	Premiers
1993	Port Melbourne (15)	16–2	64	146.3	Werribee	8 points	Runners-up
1994	Sandringham (4)	16–2	64	180.5	Box Hill	8 points	Premiers
1995	Springvale (1)	15–1	60	173.7	Port Melbourne	12 points	Premiers
1996	Frankston (1)	16– 2	64	199.3	Werribee	12 points	Runners-up
1997	Frankston (2)	17–1	68	167.5	Springvale	12 points	Runners-up
1998	Werribee (2)	16–2	64	164.0	Frankston	20.7%	Runners-up
1999	Springvale (2)	15–3	60	146.6	Frankston	8 points	Premiers
2000	Sandringham (5)	16–3	64	147.3	North Ballarat	8 points	Premiers
2001	Werribee (3)	18–2	72	173.3	Box Hill	12 points	Runners-up
2002	Geelong reserves (1)	17–3	68	157.7	Werribee	4 points	Premiers
2003	Port Melbourne (16)	14–3–1	58	133.3	Williamstown	2 points	3rd
2004	Port Melbourne (17)	14–4	56	134.6	Sandringham	4 points	Runners-up
2005	Werribee (4)	15–3	60	134.5	Northern Bullants	6 points	Runners-up
2006	Northern Bullants (8)	17–1	68	178.2	Sandringham	16 points	3rd
2007	Sandringham (6)	15–3	60	132.4	Geelong reserves	4 points	5th
2008	Port Melbourne (18)	13–3	52	140.3	North Ballarat	4.8%	Runners-up
2009	North Ballarat (1)	14–4	56	128.4	Williamstown	4 points	Premiers
2010	Williamstown (10)	15–3	60	165.7	North Ballarat	37.4%	3rd
2011	Port Melbourne (19)	18–0	76	156.2	Williamstown	16 points	Premiers
2012	Casey (3)	14–4	56	105.8	Port Melbourne	4 points	5th
2013	Geelong reserves (2)	16–2	64	166.8	Box Hill	12 points	Runners-up
2014	Port Melbourne (20)	16–2	64	155.4	Footscray reserves	8 points	3rd
2015	Box Hill (1)	14–4	56	151.8	Sandringham	28.1%	Runners-up
2016	Casey (4)	14–4	56	167.8	Collingwood reserves	51.3%	Runners-up
2017	Williamstown (11)	14–4	56	158.4	Box Hill	2 points	3rd
2018	Richmond reserves (1)	14–4	56	159.5	Casey	18.3%	5th
2019	Richmond reserves (2)	16–2	64	135.5	Footscray reserves	6 points	Premiers
2020	Season not contested						
2021	Footscray reserves (1)	10–0	40	169.7	Southport	10.0 M/R (Note: 2021: The minor premiership was awarded on match ratio (percentage of wins vs games played) because teams did not play an equal number of games.)	N/A (Note: 2021: The season was abandoned after the minor premiership was awarded due to the COVID-19 pandemic.)
2022	Casey (5)	17–1	68	167.3	Brisbane reserves	12 points	Premiers
2023	Gold Coast (1)	16–2	68	184.5	Werribee	16.5%	Premiers
2024	Werribee (5)	15–3	60	141.0	Footscray reserves	2 points	Premiers
2025	Footscray reserves (2)	15–3	60	145.7	Box Hill	4 points	Premiers
2026	Geelong reserves (3)	16–2	64	167.8	Werribee	10 points	TBD

Notes

Source where unlisted

=== Division 2 ===
Season	Minor premier	Record	Pts	%	Second place	Margin	Finish
1961	Northcote (1)	16–2	64	176.4	Dandenong	8 points	Premiers
1962	Preston (1)	14–2	56	160.3	Dandenong	4 points	3rd
1963	Waverley (1)	12–4	48	150.9	Preston	11.5%	Runners-up
1964	Sunshine (1)	14–4	56	140.1	Mordialloc	12 points	Runners-up
1965	Preston (2)	13–3	52	196.2	Mordialloc	8 points	Premiers
1966	Northcote (2)	13–5	52	122.9	Geelong West	2 points	3rd
1967	Oakleigh (1)	14–4	56	126.0	Geelong West	4 points	Premiers
1968	Williamstown (1)	15–1–1	62	189.4	Geelong West	6 points	Runners-up
1969	Sunshine (2)	17–1	68	153.3	Coburg	4 points	Runners-up
1970	Coburg (1)	16–2	64	179.1	Sunshine	4 points	Premiers
1971	Caulfield (1)	15–3	60	159.7	Sunshine	8.7%	3rd
1972	Geelong West (1)	18–0	76	177.7	Caulfield	12 points	Premiers
1973	Caulfield (2)	15–3	60	156.0	Waverley	4 points	Premiers
1974	Coburg (2)	17–1	68	181.0	Waverley	8 points	Premiers
1975	Brunswick (1)	15–3	60	144.6	Camberwell	6 points	Premiers
1976	Frankston (1)	16–1–1	66	143.4	Mordialloc	10 points	3rd
1977	Mordialloc (1)	14–4	56	139.1	Yarraville	0.3%	Premiers
1978	Frankston (2)	15–3	60	145.9	Camberwell	4 points	Premiers
1979	Camberwell (1)	14–4	56	146.4	Oakleigh	11.1%	Premiers
1980	Yarraville (1)	14–4	56	124.0	Brunswick	8 points	Runners-up
1981	Camberwell (2)	14–4	56	160.7	Waverley	4 points	Premiers
1982	Oakleigh (2)	17–1	68	158.2	Northcote	12 points	3rd
1983	Brunswick (2)	15–3	60	193.3	Mordialloc	2 points	Runners-up
1984	Box Hill (1)	16–2 (Note: 1984: Box Hill's win-loss record includes two wins by forfeit following Yarraville's withdrawal from the competition.)	64	183.4	Brunswick	2 points	Premiers
1985	Oakleigh (3)	16–2	64	153.2	Brunswick	8 points	Runners-up
1986	Sunshine (3)	16–2	64	175.2	Box Hill	4 points	Runners-up
1987	Werribee (1)	15–3 (Note: 1987: Werribee's win-loss record includes one win by forfeit following Moorabbin's withdrawal from the competition.)	60	155.4	Waverley	4 points	3rd
1988	Oakleigh (4)	14–4	56	123.0	Werribee	16 points	Premiers

Notes

== Minor premiership wins ==
Club	Years in competition	Div 1	Div 2	Total	Runners-up (Total)
Port Melbourne	1886–pres	20	–	20	15
Williamstown	1884–pres	11	1	12	12
Coburg	1926–pres	8	2	10	7
Preston/Northern	1903–1911; 1926–pres	8	2	10	8
Footscray	1886–1924	8	–	8	3
Oakleigh	1929–1994	4	4	8	4
Northcote	1908–1987	5	2	7	4
North Melbourne	1877–1924	6	–	6	4
Sandringham	1929–pres	6	–	6	7
Brunswick	1897–1991	4	2	6	7
Springvale/Casey	1982–pres	5	0	5	4
Werribee	1965–pres	5	1	6	5
Frankston	1966–pres	2	2	4	3
Moorabbin	1951–1963	3	–	3	2
Prahran	1899–1994	3	0	3	5
Dandenong	1958–1994	3	0	3	6
Geelong West	1963–1988	2	1	3	6
Camberwell	1926–1990	1	2	3	0
Sunshine	1959–1989	0	3	3	2
Geelong reserves	2000–pres	3	–	3	1
Richmond	1885–1907	2	–	2	3
Richmond reserves	2014–pres	2	–	2	0
Box Hill	1951–pres	1	1	2	6
Caulfield	1965–1987	0	2	2	1
Footscray reserves	2014–pres	2	–	2	3
West Melbourne	1899–1907	1	–	1	0
Essendon (A.)	1900–1921	1	–	1	3
North Ballarat	1996–2017	1	–	1	3
Waverley	1961–1987	0	1	1	6
Mordialloc	1958–1988	0	1	1	4
Yarraville	1928–1983	0	1	1	3
Brighton	1908–1964	0	0	0	3
Collingwood reserves	2008–pres	0	–	0	1
Southport	2021–pres	0	–	0	1
Brisbane reserves	2021–pres	0	–	0	1

== See also ==
- List of VFA/VFL premiers
