= 1961 VFA season =

80th season of the Victorian Football Association

Division 1
- Teams: 10
- Premiers: Yarraville; 2nd D1 premiership
- Minor premiers: Moorabbin; 1st D1 minor premiership

Division 2
- Teams: 8
- Premiers: Northcote; 1st D2 premiership
- Minor premiers: Northcote; 1st D2 minor premiership

The 1961 VFA season was the 80th season of the Victorian Football Association (VFA), an Australian rules football competition played in the state of Victoria. The season saw a significant change in the structure of the Association, with the competition split into two divisions with promotion and relegation between them, a system which remained in place until 1988.

The Division 1 premiership was won by the Yarraville Football Club, after it defeated Williamstown in the Grand Final on 30 September by 63 points; it was Yarraville's second and final VFA premiership, and its first since 1935. The inaugural Division 2 premiership was won by Northcote; it was the club's first premiership in either division since 1936.

== Division of the competition ==
Since 1956, the Association had been attempting to expand from fourteen to twenty clubs, and part of the plan to manage this was to operate in two divisions of ten clubs each. There had been two structures proposed for this: the first would see the clubs divided geographically into Northern and Southern divisions, based on their position relative to the Yarra River, and the premiers from each division would play off for the Association-wide premiership at the end of the season; the second would see a top division and a second division with promotion and relegation between them. A partial approach to geographical divisions had been trialled since 1958, with all teams competing in a single division but fixtured to play most games against teams in their geographical section. However, it was becoming recognised that difference in class between the strongest clubs and the weakest clubs was widening, resulting in a lot of very one-sided matches; it was thought that dividing into a top and second division would allow teams in both divisions to play more competitive matches, and therefore attract greater public interest.

The matter of division was discussed on 2 December 1960. The motion to change required a three-quarters majority to pass, and passed by exactly that margin, 27–9; and, in fact, the motion would have been defeated had Mordialloc, one of the five clubs to oppose the change, sent both of its delegates to the meeting; its second delegate, Jack Danckert, was unavailable as his wife was expecting to give birth, and Mordialloc did not have time to arrange for his proxy to attend, leaving it with only one of its two votes. The five clubs to vote against the motion were Mordialloc, which was destined for Division 1, and Camberwell, Dandenong, Preston and Sunshine, which were all destined for Division 2. Yarraville and Northcote had been expected to oppose the change, but both ultimately voted for it. Clubs opposed to the change were concerned that the prestige and popularity of Division 2 would be significantly diminished, such that it would become seen as little more than a junior competition, and that local councils may withdraw their support for lower division teams.

The arrangements for the division of the Association were as follows:

- The top ten clubs from 1960 would make up Division 1.
- The remaining seven clubs would make up Division 2.
- Any new club to join the Association would begin in Division 2.
- Promotion and relegation was decided by:
  - The tenth-placed team in Division 1 would automatically be relegated to Division 2
  - The Division 2 premiers would automatically be promoted to Division 1
  - The Division 2 runners-up would play-off against the ninth-placed team from Division 1, with the winning team to play Division 1 the following season; this provision was abandoned after only two seasons
- Each club's Seconds and Thirds would always play in the same division as the firsts

The two-division format was used in the VFA from 1961 until 1988, although the promotion and relegation structure was restructured in 1982.

== Association membership ==
The Association actively sought an eighteenth team to balance the fixture in Division 2. Springvale, a former power club in Caulfield Oakleigh District League, which had switched to the Federal League in the mid-1950s and won the 1960 premiership, was approached by the Association as its first choice for admission, but the club was concerned that it was not yet ready for senior football, and that its proximity to the popular Oakleigh and Dandenong clubs would stifle its competitiveness. The Association then took applications from two Caulfield Oakleigh District League clubs: Glen Waverley, a power club of the 1950s, and East Malvern, the 1960 premiers. East Malvern, like Springvale, ultimately decided that it was not ready for the step up to senior football, so on 21 December 1960, it withdrew its application and Glen Waverley was admitted to the Association. The club was renamed the Waverley Football Club, and played its matches on the Central Reserve in Glen Waverley.

In January 1961, the future of the struggling Brighton Football Club for the 1961 season looked bleak. The club had few supporters, few assets, and when a committee meeting on 20 January to appoint a coach drew only seven committeemen, the club realised that it had barely enough off-field manpower to operate its administration. In a general meeting on 26 January attended by only fourteen voting members and 35 people in total, it was proposed to disband the club, but the members voted 10–4 to continue operating – buoyed by hopes that Sunday matches and a more competitive fixture in Division 2 would help the club. However, even in Division 2, the club endured one of the worst VFA seasons on record (winless with a percentage of only 29.0 and an average losing margin of 103 points), its best players were leaving the club in favour of the Federal League, and the possibility of disbanding was again on the club's agenda ten months later.

== Sunday football ==
Following its success in 1960, the Association continued to play matches on Sundays. As in 1960, any match could be moved from Saturday to Sunday by mutual agreement between the clubs, with approval from the ground management and local council, and with part of the gate donated to charity. Sunday crowds continued to be strong, and clubs who hosted the matches found that even with the donation, they were earning as much from one Sunday game as they were from three or four Saturday games. After Oakleigh withdrew from playing Sunday games at mid-season, nine of the Association's eighteen clubs were willing and able to play Sunday games.

== Division 1 ==
The Division 1 home-and-home season was played over 22 rounds – spread over 21 weekends with a full round on Anzac Day Tuesday. The top four then contested the finals under the Page–McIntyre system, abandoning the top six format which had been used in the single-division 1960 season. Division 1 finals continued to be played at the St Kilda Cricket Ground on Saturdays.

=== Ladder ===
1961 VFA Division 1 Ladder
Pos	Team	Pld	W	L	D	PF	PA	PP	Pts
1	Moorabbin	22	16	6	0	1870	1501	124.6	64
2	Yarraville (P)	22	14	8	0	1887	1580	119.4	56
3	Sandringham	22	14	8	0	1988	1704	116.7	56
4	Williamstown	22	13	9	0	1794	1569	114.3	52
5	Oakleigh	22	12	10	0	2022	1882	107.4	48
6	Port Melbourne	22	11	11	0	2015	1823	110.5	44
7	Coburg	22	10	11	1	1786	1802	99.1	42
8	Brunswick	22	9	13	0	1653	1916	86.3	36
9	Mordialloc	22	7	15	0	1564	1983	78.9	28
10	Box Hill	22	3	18	1	1454	2276	63.9	14

Rules for classification: 1) points; 2) percentage; 3) number of points for.
(P) Premiers

=== Finals ===
	Semi-finals
Saturday, 9 September	Sandringham 9.9 (63)	def. by	Williamstown 12.7 (79)	St Kilda Cricket Ground (crowd: 11,000)
Saturday, 16 September	Moorabbin 8.14 (62)	def. by	Yarraville 13.14 (92)	St Kilda Cricket Ground (crowd: 8,000)

	Preliminary Final
Saturday, 23 September	Moorabbin 15.7 (97)	def. by	Williamstown 14.17 (101)	St Kilda Cricket Ground (crowd: 10,000)

1961 VFA Division 1 Grand Final
Saturday, 30 September	Yarraville	def.	Williamstown	St Kilda Cricket Ground (crowd: 20,000)
6.2 (38); 8.2 (50); 19.6 (120); 22.7 (139)	Q1; Q2; Q3; Final	1.0 (6); 5.6 (36); 6.7 (43); 11.10 (76)	Umpires: K. Woolfe
Crook 4, McCarthy 4, Carey 3, Lamont 2, Meddings 2, Whitten 2, Ron Brown, McGill, Pearce, Vautier, M. Wilson	Goals	Clough 4, Mazouris 3, Cope, Maloney, Pelly, Williams
Lamont (ankle)	Injuries	Pelly (ankle)
Reports	McAsey, for striking M. Wilson in the second quarter Murphy, for striking Ron Brown in the second quarter

=== Awards ===
- The leading goalkicker for the season was Bob Bonnett (Port Melbourne), who kicked 111 goals.
- The J. J. Liston Trophy was won by Doug Beasy (Box Hill), who polled 39 votes. Beasy finished ahead of Graham Crook (Yarraville), who polled 29 votes, and Ray Smith (Williamstown), who polled 28 votes.
- Sandringham won the seconds premiership. Sandringham 12.11 (83) defeated Oakleigh 10.12 (72) in the Grand Final, played as a curtain-raiser to the firsts Grand Final on 30 September.

== Division 2 ==
The Division 2 home-and-home season was played over 18 rounds, four fewer than Division 1. The season started on the same weekend, but finished three weeks earlier, with no matches on Anzac Day. The top four played finals under the Page–McIntyre system. The Division 2 Grand Final was scheduled for the same weekend as the Division 1 First semi-final, with the promotion-relegation playoff scheduled for the following weekend. Division 2 finals were played at Toorak Park on Sundays.

=== Ladder ===
1961 VFA Division 2 Ladder
Pos	Team	Pld	W	L	D	PF	PA	PP	Pts
1	Northcote (P)	18	16	2	0	1728	985	175.4	64
2	Dandenong (RU)	18	14	4	0	1729	1251	138.2	56
3	Preston	18	11	7	0	1728	1193	144.8	44
4	Camberwell	18	9	9	0	1666	1530	108.9	36
5	Prahran	18	9	9	0	1386	1422	97.5	36
6	Waverley	18	8	10	0	1603	1559	102.8	32
7	Sunshine	18	5	13	0	1554	1606	96.8	20
8	Brighton	18	0	18	0	761	2621	29.0	0

Rules for classification: 1) points; 2) percentage; 3) number of points for.
(P) Premiers

=== Finals ===
	Semifinals
Sunday, 20 August	Preston 8.9 (57)	def. by	Camberwell 15.24 (114)	Toorak Park (crowd: 10,000)
Sunday, 27 August	Northcote 13.7 (85)	def.	Dandenong 8.13 (61)	Toorak Park (crowd: 9,000)

	Preliminary Final
Sunday, 3 September	Dandenong 18.15 (123)	def.	Camberwell 17.10 (112)	Toorak Park (crowd: 7,000)

1961 VFA Division 2 Grand Final
Sunday, 10 September	Northcote	def.	Dandenong	Toorak Park (crowd: 10,000)
2.1 (13); 5.8 (38); 8.13 (61); 12.15 (87)	Q1; Q2; Q3; Final	2.8 (20); 3.12 (30); 6.15 (51); 9.18 (72)	Umpires: J. McMaster
Taylor 5, Shearn 2, Aghan, Dowling, Oliver, Ousley, Wright	Goals	T. Waters 4, Little 2, Abraham, Gray, Minotti
Injuries	Good (thigh)
Reports	Morris, for striking Wright

=== Awards ===
- The leading goalkicker for Division 2 was Ron O'Neill (Camberwell), who kicked 85 goals in the home-and-home season, and a further ten goals in finals.
- The Division 2 Best and Fairest was won by Pat Fitzgerald (Sunshine), who polled 35 votes. Neil Wright (Northcote) was second with 25 votes, and Don Scott (Waverley) was third with 20 votes.
- Preston won the seconds premiership. Preston 15.22 (112) defeated Northcote 12.5 (77) in the Grand Final, played as a stand-alone match on Saturday, 2 September at Dandenong.

== Promotion and relegation ==
Division 2 premier Northcote was promoted to Division 1 for 1962, and tenth-placed Division 1 club Box Hill was relegated to Division 2. A play-off for promotion was held between Division 2 runners-up, Dandenong and ninth-placed Division 1 club Mordialloc; Mordialloc won by 23 points, and therefore held its place in Division 1 for 1962. Len Crane's eleven goals stood as the Mordialloc record for most goals in a game until Peter Neville joined the club in the late 1970s.

1961 VFA Promotion–Relegation Challenge Match
Saturday, 16 September	Dandenong	def. by	Mordialloc	Dandenong Showgrounds (crowd: 3,000)
3.5 (23); 4.9 (33); 9.16 (70); 13.9 (97)	Q1; Q2; Q3; Final	5.4 (34); 8.6 (54); 14.10 (94); 18.12 (120)	Umpires: Trewin
T. Waters 3, Abrahams 2, Minotti 2, Morris 2, B. Waters 2, Delanty, Dineen	Goals	Crane 11, Minihan 3, Pearson 2, Gill, Kavanagh

== Notable events ==
=== Anzac Day ===
Anzac Day fell on a Tuesday in 1961. According to the Anzac Day Act, the R.S.L. would receive half of any Anzac Day gate less expenses, so the R.S.L. was keen to see high-drawing football matches played on the day. The Association scheduled a full round of Division 1 matches, and the Victorian Football League scheduled two of its six Round 3 matches, both at low-capacity venues (Windy Hill and Punt Road Oval).

The R.S.L. was disappointed that the League had not scheduled a match at the Melbourne Cricket Ground, so Sandringham arranged to move its match against Moorabbin to the venue instead. The build-up to the match was one of the biggest in Association history: the Association prepared a spectacle of a similar scale to the AFL's modern Anzac Day clash – featuring a troupe of marching girls, the Southern Command Band playing the Last Post, Reveille and the national anthem, and running races at half time – the final quarter of the match was to be televised, and the R.S.L. urged the public to support the Association match ahead of the suburban League matches.

With this build-up, and the interest in a match between two strong rival clubs, the Association hoped to attract as many as 60,000 spectators, which would have exceeded the 1939 Grand Final (47,000 spectators) as the largest crowd in its history. However, a disappointing crowd of only 13,842 attended – by comparison, the League match at the neighbouring Punt Road Oval drew 27,650, and the match at Windy Hill drew 32,000. A strong gate and donation to the R.S.L. was still drawn, but considering that the next Sandringham–Moorabbin match at Moorabbin Oval also drew 14,000, it is questionable whether switching to the Melbourne Cricket Ground drew any extra fans.

=== Interstate matches ===
The Association played one interstate match during 1961, against Tasmania in Hobart on Queen's Birthday, Monday, 12 June 1961. Jim Cleary, coach of Division 2 club Dandenong, was a surprise choice as coach; Williamstown's Ray Smith was captain. An inaccurate goalkicking display saw the Association kick twelve behinds before registering its first goal, and Tasmania went on to defeat the Association by 23 points.

	1961 Interstate matches
Monday, 12 June	Tasmania 17.12 (114)	def.	Victoria (VFA) 11.25 (91)	North Hobart Oval (crowd: 14,000)

=== Other notable events ===
- The Elsternwick Park management regraded Elsternwick Park during the 1961 season, so the Brighton Football Club could not play there; Brighton instead played its matches at Sandringham and Brighton Beach Oval. Brighton never ultimately returned to Elsternwick Park, as the ground's management refused to lease the ground to the struggling club in 1962, leading to its move to Caulfield.
- The Association purchased the Clydebank building in Jolimont to use as its administrative headquarters, moving out of the VCA Building in Collins Place.
- On 17 June, Brunswick's Jim Whiley, who was usually a defender but had just begun playing in the forward line, kicked a goal after the final siren from a free kick to win the game; Brunswick 12.17 (89) defeated Sandringham 12.16 (88).
- In a seconds match, Sunshine scored 57.42 (384) against a struggling Brighton team which was finding it increasingly difficult to find enough players to fill a seconds team. It set a new record for the highest score across all grades of the Association.
- In heavy rain on 8 July, George Mazouris kicked Williamstown's only goal against Yarraville in the final few minutes of the game. Yarraville 4.8 (32) defeated Williamstown 1.5 (11).
- On Sunday 16 July, Brunswick 12.20 (92) defeated Port Melbourne 11.13 (79). Port Melbourne protested the result on the basis that Brunswick's Ian Lewis, who took the field as a replacement during the game, was ineligible to play after having played in Brunswick's Seconds match on the Saturday, a rule it believed to have been introduced when Sunday games were introduced in 1960; the Association dismissed the protest after confirming that no such rule actually existed.

== See also ==
- List of VFA/VFL premiers
