= Ron Rolfe =

Australian rules footballer

Personal information
- Full name: Ronald George Rolfe
- Born: 10 March 1941 (age 85)
- Original team: Murrumbeena
- Height: 179 cm (5 ft 10 in)
- Weight: 89 kg (196 lb)
- Position: Forward

Playing career^{1}
Years	Club	Games (Goals)
1961	South Melbourne	8 (4)
1962–63	Moorabbin (VFA)	
1964	Brighton-Caulfield (VFA)	
1965–68	Waverley (VFA)	
- ^{1} Playing statistics correct to the end of 1968.

Ronald George Rolfe (born 10 March 1941) is a former Australian rules footballer who played with South Melbourne in the Victorian Football League (VFL).
