= Jack Storey (footballer) =

Australian rules footballer (1929–2026)

Personal information
- Full name: John Ivan Storey
- Born: 1 July 1929
- Died: 15 September 2026 (aged 97)
- Original team: West Footscray
- Height: 178 cm (5 ft 10 in)
- Weight: 71 kg (157 lb)
- Position: Centreman

Playing career^{1}
Years	Club	Games (Goals)
1948–1949	Footscray	11 (6)
1950–1955	Port Melbourne (VFA)	126

Coaching career
Years	Club	Games (W–L–D)
1960–1961	Sunshine (VFA)	
- ^{1} Playing statistics correct to the end of 1955.

Career highlights
- Port Melbourne best and fairest: 1950; Port Melbourne premiership player: 1953

John Ivan Storey (1 July 1929 – 15 September 2026) was an Australian rules footballer who played with Footscray in the Victorian Football League (VFL). He also played for Port Melbourne and coached Sunshine in the Victorian Football Association (VFA).

== Career ==
=== Footscray ===
Storey played originally in the Footscray District Football League, for West Footscray. He won the league's "C Grade" best and fairest award in 1947 and soon after represented a combined district team against Footscray and made enough of an impression to be recruited by the VFL club.

A centreman, Storey played five games for Footscray in the 1948 VFL season, with his debut coming against Hawthorn in round 14. He made a further six appearances in 1949, then joined Port Melbourne in the VFA the following year.

=== VFA ===
Storey won Port Melbourne's best and fairest in his first season, which ended in the disappointment of a grand final loss, to Oakleigh. Port Melbourne were runners up again in 1951 and 1952, before triumphing in 1953, when they defeated Yarraville by 60 points in the grand final, with Storey as centreman. He remained with the club until his appointment as captain-coach of Metropolitan League club Sunshine in 1956.

Sunshine were admitted into the VFA in 1959, under Ken Seymour, but Storey was non playing coach for the second half of the 1960 season, as well as the 1961 VFA season.

== Death ==
Storey died on 15 September 2026, at the age of 97.
