= 1964 VFA season =

Division 1
- Teams: 10
- Premiers: Port Melbourne; 8th D1 premiership
- Minor premiers: Williamstown; 9th D1 minor premiership

Division 2
- Teams: 8
- Premiers: Geelong West; 1st D2 premiership
- Minor premiers: Sunshine; 1st D2 minor premiership

The 1964 Victorian Football Association season was the 83rd season of the top division of the Australian rules football competition, and the fourth season of its second division. The Division 1 premiership was won by the Port Melbourne Football Club, after it defeated Williamstown in the Grand Final on 26 September by 36 points; it was Port Melbourne's 8th VFA premiership. The Division 2 premiership was won by Geelong West, in only its second season in the VFA.

== Association membership ==
Less than a month before the 1964 season, the defending Division 1 premier club, Moorabbin, was suspended from the Association, in the aftermath of the Victorian Football League's St Kilda Football Club announcing its intention to move its playing and administrative base to Moorabbin Oval from 1965.

=== Background ===
In the early 1960s, many Victorian Football League clubs were dissatisfied with their home grounds. In some cases, such as Hawthorn at Glenferrie Oval, the grounds were small and the surroundings prohibited expansion. In other cases, such as Fitzroy at Brunswick Street Oval, the local district cricket club, rather than the football club, had the controlling occupancy of the ground, leaving the football clubs with unsatisfactory lease arrangements and little control over how the ground was managed. Some Association grounds offered attractive solutions to the League clubs' problems: the grounds were often newer and larger than the older League grounds, they were not controlled by a strong traditional cricket club, and had the added benefit of being located in rapidly growing outer suburbs whence a League club could attract new fans.

At the same time, many local councils in the outer suburbs harboured ambitions of bringing League football to their districts, seeing great opportunity and great prestige in it. Councils, particularly those which oversaw a large population and managed a good quality ground, such as Moorabbin and Coburg, had been actively seeking to be represented in the League for several years.

These combined driving forces had led to much discussion about League grounds leading up to 1964. Over the previous few years, two League clubs had made formal, but unsuccessful, attempts to move to Association grounds: St Kilda, to Brighton's then-home ground at Elsternwick Park in 1959; and Fitzroy to the Preston football ground starting in 1962 – and there were several other rumours, most notably that Richmond was interested in moving to Oakleigh.

=== Accusations against Preston and Moorabbin in October 1963 ===
The first grounds-related controversy of the off-season occurred in October 1963, when the Moorabbin and Preston Football Clubs – the reigning Division 1 and Division 2 premiers respectively – were both accused of having attempted to amalgamate with League teams, or having otherwise facilitated attempts by those League teams to move into their grounds. Both clubs were forced to face the Association executive committee to outline the roles, if any, that they had played in the negotiations.

Preston

Preston faced the Association on 15 October, over ongoing speculation of dealings with the Fitzroy Football Club since its first attempt to move to Preston in 1962. The Association decided that Fitzroy had been negotiating only with the Preston Council, that the Preston Football Club had been involved only in the discussions that it could not avoid under the circumstances, and that the club was remaining loyal to the Association and had not sought amalgamation. No further action was taken against the club.

Moorabbin

Moorabbin faced the Association on 29 October. Moorabbin was accused of having proposed to amalgamate with Richmond during the previous season (but been turned down), and having also engaged in discussions with Fitzroy over the potential for a move or amalgamation. The executive found that Moorabbin had been acting against the interests of the Association, and it recommended that the club be expelled.

On 1 November, Moorabbin's fate was discussed at a Board of Management meeting. Moorabbin president Mr Don Bricker commented that "all that is wrong with Moorabbin is that it is too progressive for the VFA"; but he also stated in the club's defence that the Moorabbin Council was the main driving force behind the push to get a League club to Moorabbin Oval, and that it was in his club's best interests to support the council and pursue amalgamation with a League club, rather than oppose the council and find itself homeless and forced to disband if and when a League club moved in. The motion to expel the club required a two-thirds majority to pass, and was defeated by a single vote, with the final count 27–15 in favour of expulsion.

As such, preparations were made for the 1964 season including both Preston and Moorabbin in the fixture.

=== St Kilda's move to Moorabbin Oval ===
On 24 March 1964, the St Kilda Football Club announced that it would move its playing and administrative base to Moorabbin Oval, starting from the 1965 season, under an agreement that was formally signed in July 1964. The Moorabbin council agreed to invest a further £100,000 to bring the venue to VFL standards and expand its capacity to 50,000. The St Kilda Football Club signed a 75-year £5,000 per year deal for the ground, under which it became ground manager, and committed to invest £120,000 in establishing a licensed social club and to invest £375,000 for ground improvements over the first 45 years of the deal, and would sublet the ground to and prepare wickets for the sub-district Moorabbin Cricket Club during summer. St Kilda's move was mostly motivated by the desire to be ground manager: its existing home, the St Kilda Cricket Ground, was a very good quality venue with no specific failings to motivate the club to move (The Sun News-Pictorial described it as the fourth-best football/cricket oval in the country, behind only the Melbourne Cricket Ground, Sydney Cricket Ground and Adelaide Oval), but the St Kilda Cricket Club was ground manager and therefore controlled how the ground was operated and developed. Other benefits St Kilda derived from its move were that it could operate and profit from its own social club at the new venue, it was at lower cost than the £8,000 per year rent it had paid at St Kilda, it escaped an arrangement under which cricket club members could purchase football club memberships for only one third of the regular price, and it allowed the club to appeal to new fans in the fast-growing Moorabbin area; the club had initially announced that it would change its name to the St Kilda–Moorabbin Football Club after the move, but these plans were abandoned two weeks later. The announcement came as a complete surprise to the football public, as there had been no rumours that the club was interested in leaving the St Kilda Cricket Ground since its attempt to move to Elsternwick Park in 1959.

The announcement came after two months of secret negotiations between St Kilda and the Moorabbin Council; and according to Bricker, the Moorabbin Football Club knew nothing of the negotiations until being informed in a meeting with both parties on 24 March, just hours before the move was first publicly announced. It was considered a near certainty that the loss of its ground would have resulted in the club's expulsion from the Association, so the Moorabbin Council committed to providing a replacement Association-standard venue in the district if the football club wished it to do so. The football club held an extraordinary meeting on 25 March, and at that meeting determined that its official position was to support the council in its efforts to attract League football to the district, and to seek to amalgamate with the St Kilda Football Club.

At its next meeting on 3 April, the Association Board of Management again discussed expelling Moorabbin for "an act prejudicial to the V.F.A. in supporting League football". This time, the motion to expel succeeded in getting the two-thirds majority it required, passing by 30–12; the six clubs to oppose the motion were Northcote, Moorabbin itself, and fellow south-eastern clubs Sandringham, Brighton–Caulfield, Mordialloc and Dandenong. The club was suspended from the Association indefinitely, but with its position to be reviewed at the end of the season. Moorabbin's position in Division 1 was filled at less than three weeks' notice by the 1963 Division 2 runners-up, Waverley, and the size of Division 2 was reduced to eight teams.

Moorabbin turned down offers to join the Federal League and the South-Eastern Suburban League at short notice for 1964, because playing in a league not affiliated with the Australian National Football Council would have precluded any chance of re-admission to the Association in 1965. With no other options available at such short notice, Moorabbin sat out of football in 1964. All of its players received clearances to any club of their choosing, under the condition that they return to Moorabbin if and when it returned to the Association. The vast majority of its players went to the other south-eastern clubs which voted against its expulsion; Brighton-Caulfield was a particular beneficiary, and the twelve key senior players it recruited from Moorabbin lifted the struggling club, which had won eight wooden spoons in the previous twelve years, into the finals for the first time since 1950.

As the season progressed, the club had to deal with £1500 of debts it had accrued as pre-season expenses, but without any steady income from takings, and the motivation of Moorabbin's committee to seek re-admission to the Association waned. With no home games at which to carry out the tradition, the club's 1963 premiership flag was unfurled at a social event at Moorabbin Oval on the evening of 4 July; this was the club's VFA swan song, as two nights later the committee voted 19–2 to abandon attempts to seek readmission in 1965. It began investigating a return to the Federal League, and ultimately disbanded. Bricker went on to join the St Kilda committee in December 1964.

== Division 1 ==
The Division 1 home-and-home season was played over 18 rounds; the top four then contested the finals under the Page–McIntyre system.

=== Ladder ===
1964 VFA Division 1 ladder
Pos	Team	Pld	W	L	D	PF	PA	PP	Pts
1	Williamstown	18	14	4	0	1567	1370	114.4	56
2	Port Melbourne (P)	18	13	5	0	1655	1411	117.3	52
3	Sandringham	18	13	5	0	1712	1497	114.4	52
4	Coburg	18	12	6	0	1620	1311	123.6	48
5	Yarraville	18	11	7	0	1691	1624	104.1	44
6	Dandenong	18	8	9	1	1382	1258	109.9	34
7	Brunswick	18	5	12	1	1221	1496	81.6	22
8	Oakleigh	18	5	13	0	1404	1580	88.9	20
9	Waverley	18	4	13	1	1318	1773	74.3	18
10	Preston	18	3	14	1	1451	1701	85.3	14

Rules for classification: 1) points; 2) percentage; 3) number of points for.
(P) Premiers

=== Finals ===
	Semi-finals
Saturday, 5 September	Sandringham 12.11 (83)	def. by	Coburg 19.18 (132)	North Port Oval (crowd: 8,000)
Saturday, 12 September	Williamstown 9.20 (74)	def. by	Port Melbourne 20.6 (126)	North Port Oval (crowd: 8,000)

	Preliminary Final
Saturday, 19 September	Williamstown 12.15 (87)	def.	Coburg 10.13 (73)	North Port Oval (crowd: 10,000)

1964 VFA Division 1 Grand Final
Saturday, 26 September	Port Melbourne	def.	Williamstown	North Port Oval (crowd: 26,000)
7.5 (47); 9.8 (62); 11.9 (75); 14.17 (101)	Q1; Q2; Q3; Final	1.0 (6); 4.2 (26); 6.4 (40); 10.5 (65)	Umpires: A. Rowe
Milner 4, Freyer 4, Bowen 3, Castlehow, Jeffery, Taggart	Goals	Carmichael 3, Ware 3, Railton 2, Fitch, Jenkinson
Milner (cut eye)	Injuries

=== Awards ===
- The leading goalkicker for the season was Alan Cook (Brunswick), who kicked 65 goals during the season.
- The J. J. Liston Trophy was won by Oakleigh captain-coach Bill Jones, who polled 32 votes. Brian Bibby (Brunswick) was second with 29 votes, and Dandenong captain Gerry Pennefather was third with 23 votes.
- Port Melbourne won the seconds premiership. Port Melbourne 18.14 (122) defeated Brunswick 16.16 (112) in the Grand Final, played as a curtain-raiser to the firsts Grand Final on 26 September.

== Division 2 ==
The Division 2 home-and-home season was played over 18 rounds; the top four then contested the finals under the Page–McIntyre system.

=== Ladder ===
1964 VFA Division 2 ladder
Pos	Team	Pld	W	L	D	PF	PA	PP	Pts
1	Sunshine	18	14	4	0	1544	1102	140.1	56
2	Mordialloc	18	11	7	0	1325	1173	113.0	44
3	Geelong West (P)	18	11	7	0	1415	1301	108.8	44
4	Brighton–Caulfield	18	11	7	0	1503	1444	104.1	44
5	Northcote	18	8	10	0	1274	1466	86.9	32
6	Prahran	18	7	11	0	1275	1457	87.5	28
7	Camberwell	18	6	12	0	1406	1714	82.0	24
8	Box Hill	18	4	14	0	1263	1483	85.2	16

Rules for classification: 1) points; 2) percentage; 3) number of points for.
(P) Premiers

=== Finals ===
	Semi-finals
Sunday, 23 August	Geelong West 14.15 (99)	def.	Brighton–Caulfield 10.7 (67)	Toorak Park (crowd: 8,000)
Sunday, 30 August	Sunshine 13.12 (90)	def.	Mordialloc 9.20 (74)	Toorak Park (crowd: 7,500)

	Preliminary Final
Sunday, 6 September	Mordialloc 10.13 (73)	def. by	Geelong West 10.18 (78)	Toorak Park (crowd: 5,000)

1964 VFA Division 2 Grand Final
Sunday, 13 September	Sunshine	def. by	Geelong West	Toorak Park (crowd: 10,000)
1.2 (8); 4.8 (32); 5.9 (39); 11.11 (77)	Q1; Q2; Q3; Final	4.5 (29); 6.7 (43); 9.10 (64); 14.14 (98)	Umpires: Armstrong
Crosbie 2, Fitzgerald 2, Howard 2, Doll, Gregory, McIntyre, Slattery, Wapling	Goals	Long 3, Bennett 2, Hardiman 2, Horey 2, McDonald 2, Goggin, Mackay, Stacey
Roach (eye), Wapling (leg)	Injuries

=== Awards ===
- The leading goalkicker for Division 2 was Ron O'Neill (Camberwell), who kicked 77 goals in the season.
- The Division 2 Best and Fairest was won by Shaun Crosbie (Sunshine), who polled 43 votes. Alex Gardiner (Box Hill) was second with 31 votes, and Ray Ransome (Brighton–Caulfield) was third with 29 votes.
- Northcote won the seconds premiership. Northcote 22.9 (141) defeated Geelong West 14.6 (90) in the Grand Final, played as a stand-alone match on Saturday, 5 September at Selwyn Park.

== Notable events ==
=== Interstate matches ===
The Association played one interstate match during 1964, against Tasmania in Launceston. Williamstown's Gerry Callahan coached the team, and Sunshine's Shaun Crosbie was captain.

	1964 Interstate matches
Saturday, 6 June	Tasmania 10.8 (68)	def. by	Victoria (VFA) 14.11 (95)	York Park (crowd: 9,288)

=== Other notable events ===
- The match between Sandringham and Port Melbourne on 19 April, which was Sandringham's first ever home Sunday game, drew a ground record crowd of 18,000 to Hampton Oval.
- Early in the season, newly promoted Preston lost its first game at the Preston Football Ground since 1961, ending a home winning streak lasting twenty games.
- In the final round of home-and-home matches in Division 1, Waverley 15.9 (99) defeated Preston 8.14 (62) in a match which directly decided which of the clubs was relegated.
- In the Division 1 second semi-final, inaccurate kicking by Williamstown saw it lead Port Melbourne 4.13 (37) to 1.0 (6) at quarter time; Williamstown went on to lose by 52 points, despite finishing with three more scoring shots than Port Melbourne.

== See also ==
- List of VFA/VFL premiers
