= Ian McGuinness =

Australian rules footballer

Personal information
- Full name: Ian McGuinness
- Born: 15 October 1953 (age 73)
- Height: 187 cm (6 ft 2 in)
- Weight: 74 kg (163 lb)

Playing career^{1}
Years	Club	Games (Goals)
1973	Melbourne	2 (0)
1975	Fitzroy	1 (0)
Total		3 (0)
- ^{1} Playing statistics correct to the end of 1975.

Ian McGuinness (born 15 October 1953) is a former Australian rules footballer who played with Melbourne and Fitzroy in the Victorian Football League (VFL).

After his solitary senior game with Fitzroy, in 1975, McGuinness was recruited by Victorian Football Association (VFA) club Prahran, where he became an outstanding centre half-back and pillar of the Two Blues' 1978 premiership team. He represented the VFA on three occasions (1979 against Queensland (QAFL) at Toorak Park, and 1980 against Northern Tasmania (NTFA) at Launceston and South Australia (SANFL) in Adelaide.

A member of Victoria Police, McGuinness was posted to Western Victoria in 1981 and Prahran cleared him to Heywood in the Western Border League, where he was appointed Captain-Coach. After a successful season, he won the League best & fairest award. A later posting brought him back to Melbourne and in 1986 he joined VFA club Moorabbin.
