= Jonathan Clegg =

Jonathan Clegg may refer to:

- Johnny Clegg (1953–2019), South African musician and anthropologist
- Jon Clegg (born 1970), British comedian and impressionist
- Jono Clegg (born 1989), British rower

== See also ==
- John Clegg (disambiguation)
