= Peter Brenchley =

Australian rules footballer

Personal information
- Born: 23 October 1936
- Died: 23 April 1991 (aged 54)
- Original team: Ormond (VAFA)
- Height: 178 cm (5 ft 10 in)
- Weight: 76 kg (168 lb)

Playing career^{1}
Years	Club	Games (Goals)
1957–1959	Melbourne	29 (14)
- ^{1} Playing statistics correct to the end of 1959.

Peter Brenchley (23 October 1936 – 23 April 1991) was an Australian rules footballer who played for Melbourne in the Victorian Football League (VFL) during the late 1950s.

Despite managing only 29 games of league football, Brenchley played in two premiership sides. In each of his three seasons he appeared in a Grand Final, winning flags in 1957 and 1959. Such was Melbourne's strength in this era that Brenchley finished on a losing team in only four games.

After leaving Melbourne, Brenchley moved to South Australia and played with Norwood in the South Australian National Football League during 1960 and 1961. He then returned to Victoria and played with Waverley in the Victorian Football Association for five seasons, where he won a premiership in 1965. In August 1966, Brenchley retired after he was suspended for the rest of the 1966 season plus twelve matches in 1967 for charging, striking and using abusive language towards field umpire David Jackson. He made a comeback in 1970 for Camberwell and coached there until 1971.
