= Wally Roach =

Australian rules footballer

Personal information
- Full name: Gustavus Walter Roach
- Born: 20 December 1885; Clunes, Victoria
- Died: 6 May 1971 (aged 85); Elsternwick, Victoria
- Original team: Prahran (VFA)
- Positions: Wing, Half forward

Playing career^{1}
| Years | Club | Games (Goals) |
| 1906–07 | Prahran (VFA) | 24 (0) |
| 1907 | South Melbourne | 1 (0) |
| 1909 | Essendon | 4 (0) |
| 1910 | St Kilda | 6 (0) |
| 1911–13 | North Melbourne (VFA) | 32 (19) |
| 1914 | Hawthorn (VFA) | 2 (0) |
| 1914 | Brighton (VFA) | 1 (0) |
- ^{1} Playing statistics correct to the end of 1910.

Gustavus Walter Roach (20 December 1885 – 6 May 1971) was an Australian rules footballer who played with South Melbourne, Essendon and St Kilda in the Victorian Football League (VFL).

== Family ==
The youngest of nine children born to William Roach (1837–1890) and Annie Amelia Chapman (1846–1926), Gustavus Walter Roach was born at Clunes on 20 December 1885.

He married Violet Emily Purkiss in 1912.

== Football ==
Roach, who played mostly on the wing or across half forward, commenced his senior football career playing with Prahran in the Victorian Football Association.

Roach subsequently made his league and South Melbourne debut in the opening round of the 1907 VFL season but did not feature again for the rest of the year.

He spent the 1908 season playing for St Kilda Wednesday.

In 1909 he returned to the VFL and had one season stints at both Essendon, and St Kilda.

He later played for Victorian Football Association (VFA) clubs North Melbourne, Hawthorn and Brighton.

== Death ==
Wally Roach died on 6 May 1971.
