= Don Whitten =

Australian rules footballer (1935–2021)

Personal information
- Born: 16 September 1935
- Died: 28 December 2021 (aged 86)
- Original team: Braybrook
- Height: 180 cm (5 ft 11 in)
- Weight: 80 kg (176 lb)
- Position: Centreman

Playing career^{1}
Years	Club	Games (Goals)
1956–1958	Footscray	24 (3)
1961–1963	Yarraville	56 (80)
- ^{1} Playing statistics correct to the end of 1968.

Career highlights
- Casterton premiership coach – 1960; Yarraville premiership player – 1961; Yarraville captain – 1963; 2nd in the J. J. Liston Trophy – 1963; Tocumwal premiership coach – 1967

Don Whitten (16 September 1935 – 28 December 2021) was an Australian rules footballer who played with Footscray in the Victorian Football League (VFL).

Whitten, who played for Footscray in the under-19s, joined his brother Ted in the senior team in 1956. He played 24 games over three seasons with Footscray, often as a centreman, then in 1959 joined Western District Football League club Casterton as coach.

He coached Casterton to a premiership in 1960, but was then replaced in the role by two-time Essendon best and fairest winner, Reg Burgess.

Instead, Whitten played for Yarraville in 1961 and was a member of their premiership side that year. He captained the club in 1963, a year in which he finished second in the J. J. Liston Trophy, to teammate John Clegg.

From 1964 to 1968, Whitten was coach of Tocumwal in the Murray Football League. During his tenure, Tocumwal made three consecutive grand finals and won the premiership in 1967.

Whitten died on 28 December 2021, at the age of 86.
