= North Port Oval =

Sports venue in Port Melbourne, Victoria

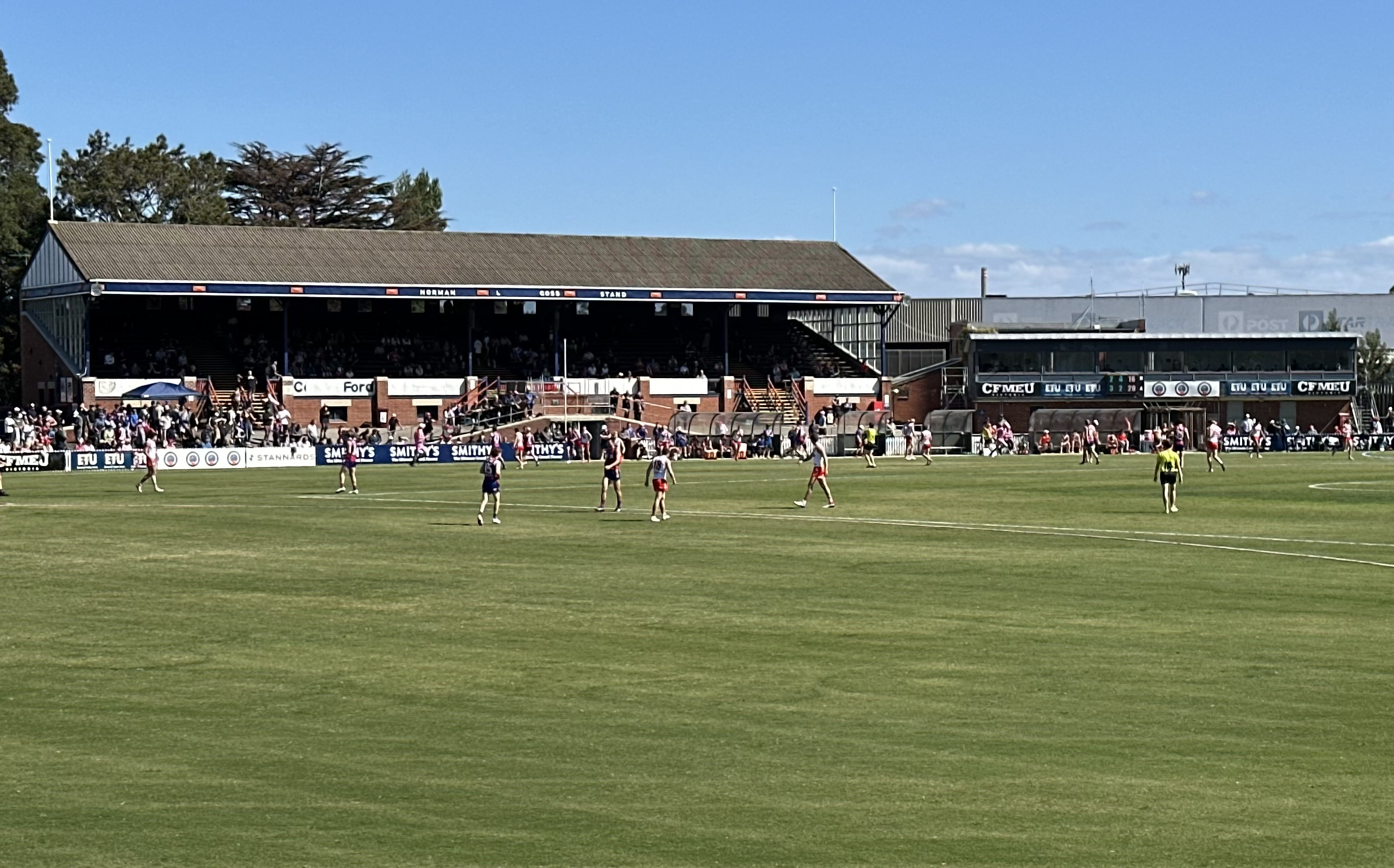
- North Port Oval in April 2026
- Interactive map of North Port Oval
- Former names: TEAC Oval; Fortburn Stadium; Stannards Stadium; Adcon Stadium
- Location: Port Melbourne, Victoria
- Coordinates: 37°49′51″S 144°56′32″E
- Capacity: 2,975
- Field size: 165 metres × 134 metres

Tenants
- Port Melbourne Football Club; Port Melbourne Cricket Club; Essendon Football Club (AFLW) (2022); Footscray Bulldogs (VFL) (2023); Coburg Football Club (VFA) (1965)

North Port Oval (known under naming rights as ETU Stadium and also referred to as the Port Melbourne Cricket Ground) is an Australian rules football and cricket venue located in Port Melbourne, Victoria. The ground serves as the home to both the Port Melbourne Cricket Club and the Port Melbourne Football Club.

== History ==
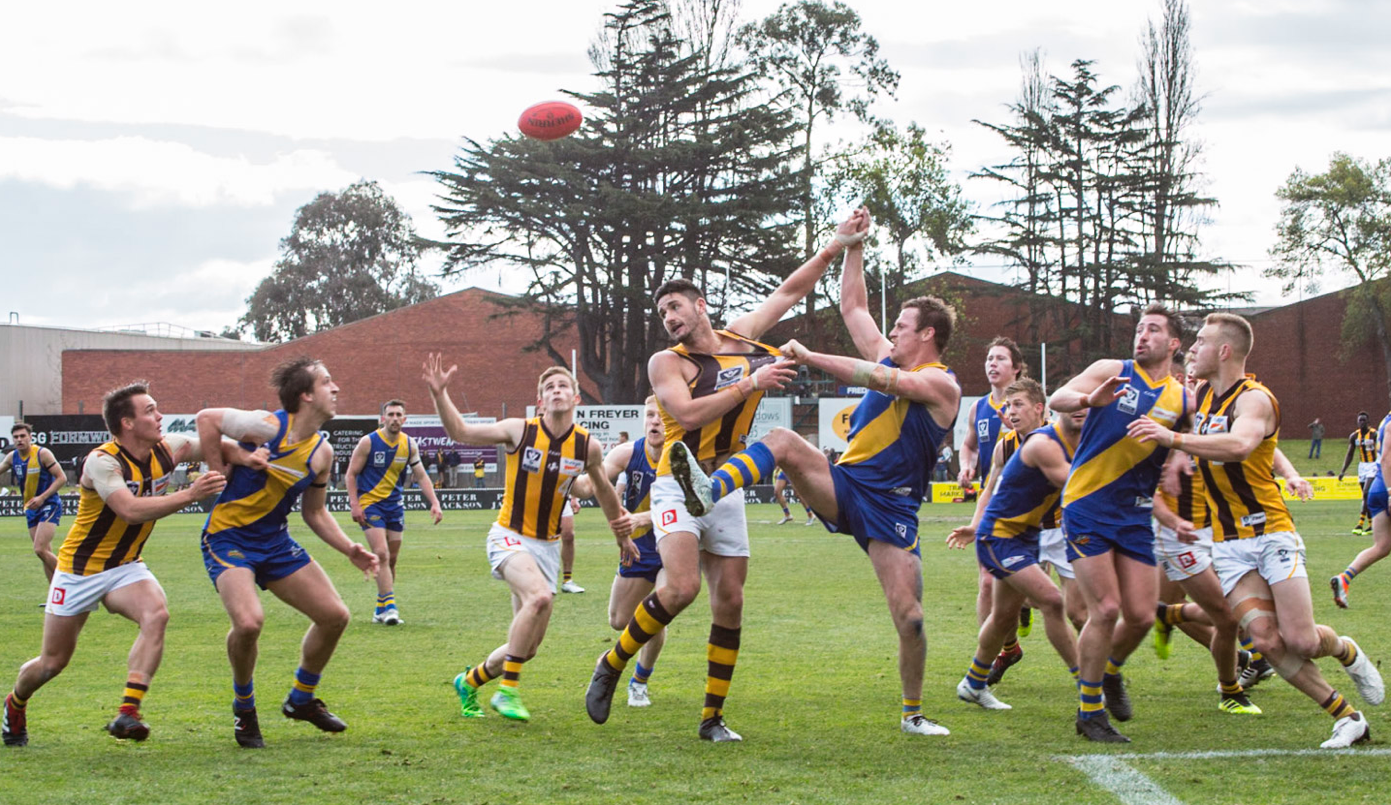
Williamstown vs Box Hill at North Port Oval in the 2nd Preliminary Final of the 2018 VFL season

North Port Oval has historically been one of the Victorian Football League's (VFL) principal venues. The ground has hosted a total of seven VFA/VFL top division Grand Finals: in 1931, 1963, 1964, 1965, 1997, 1998 and 1999. In most years from 1988 until 2019, it served as a central ground which hosted most finals matches in the first three weeks of finals; and from 1988 until 1991 served as a neutral central ground at which the majority of the ABC's telecast matches were played.

On 12 November 1927, the foundation stone for the main grandstand was laid by the mayor of the City of Port Melbourne, Cr. A.Tucker JP. In the 1970s the main grandstand was named the Norman L Goss Stand in honour of long-time Port Melbourne Football Club administrator Norm Goss Sr.

In 2014, the ends of the ground were renamed to honour of the Port Melbourne Football Club's two champion goalkickers, Fred Cook (1,210 goals) and Bob Bonnett (933 goals). The Woodruff St end is known as the Fred Cook End, and the Williamstown Rd end is known as the Bob Bonnett End.

On 30 May 2015 the redevelopment of the oval and facilities was officially opened by Mayor Cr. A.Stevens and Hon. Martin Foley MP (Member for Albert Park), with funding from City of Port Phillip, Port Melbourne Football Club, the AFL, AFL Victoria, and Victorian Government. The ground is now also home to the Sandridge Events Centre, a multi-purpose function and events building located closest to the Fred Cook End of the ground.

Light towers were installed at the ground in 2022 and were first used for a VFL Women's (VFLW) game between Port Melbourne and the Darebin Falcons on 28 May 2022.

North Port Oval hosted its first AFL Women's (AFLW) match on 4 September 2022 when Essendon hosted Carlton.

== Naming rights ==
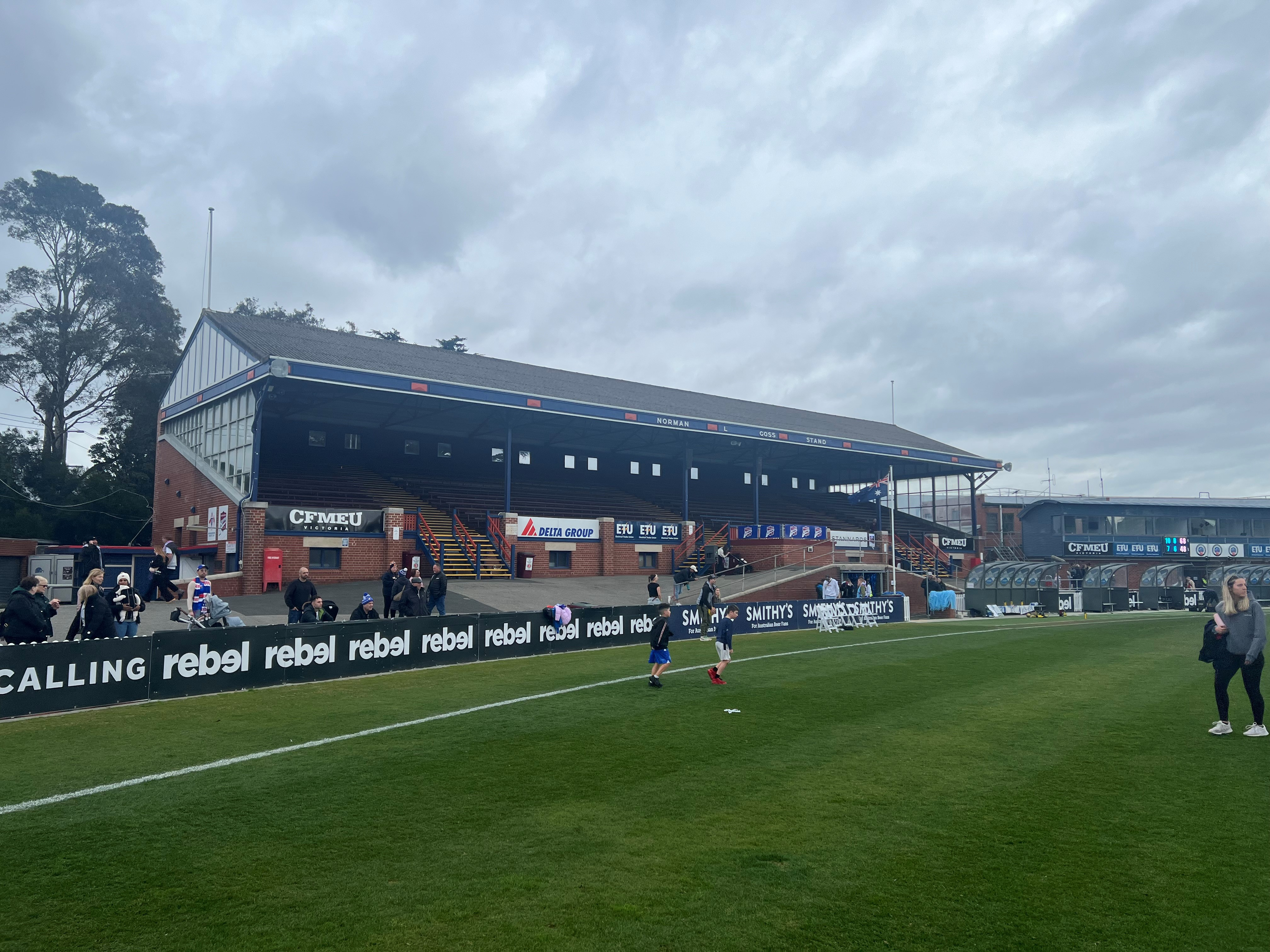
The Norman L Goss Stand pictured in 2024

The ground has been known by several sponsored names during the 21st century. It is presently known as ETU Stadium under a sponsorship deal with the Electrical Trades Union of Australia. Under its longest-lasting name, it was known as TEAC Oval from 2000 until 2011. It has previously had short term naming rights deals lasting only the end of the home and away season and the finals as Fortburn Stadium in 2017 and Stannards Stadium in 2018; and for the full season in 2019 as Adcon Stadium.

== Attendance records ==
The crowd record estimated to be 32,000 witnessed the 1953 Sunday Amateur League Grand Final between Montague and Carlton; the ground's highest VFA crowd of 26,000 was set at the 1964 Division 1 Grand Final between Port Melbourne and Williamstown.
