= Waverley Football Club =

Australian rules football club (1908–1998)

Names
- Full name: Waverley Football Club
- Former name(s): Glen Waverley Football Club (1908−1961); Waverley Amateur Football Club Inc. (1988−1991)
- Nickname: Panthers

1998 Division 4 season
- Home-and-away season: 5th

Club details
- Founded: 1908; 118 years ago
- Dissolved: 1998; 28 years ago
- Colours: Red Black
- Competition: MDFA (1908–1924); SDFA (1925–1926); BDFA (1927–1929; 1932); FFA (1930–1931); CODFL (1933–1960); VFA (1961–1987); VAFA (1989–1990); EDFL/EFL (1991–1998)
- Premierships: VFA (D1) (1): 1965
- Ground: Central Reserve (pre-1991); Columbia Park Reserve (1994−1998)

The Waverley Football Club, nicknamed the Panthers, was an Australian rules football club based in the Melbourne suburb of Glen Waverley.

The club competed in the Victorian Football Association (VFA) from 1961 until 1987. They became the Waverley Amateurs in 1988 after absorbing Clayton Amateurs, before merging with Mount Waverley Burwood to form the Waverley Blues in 1998.

== History ==
=== Early years ===
The club was formed in 1908 as the Glen Waverley Football Club and participated in A Grade of the Mulgrave District Football Association (MDFA). They briefly moved to the Scoresby District Football Association (SDFA) for the 1925 and 1926 seasons, but after finishing second-last and last place respectively in the two seasons, they joined the Berwick District Football Association (BDFA) in 1927.

Glen Waverley made its first known grand final in 1928, defeating Dandenong Rovers. However, the match was replayed on protest, with the Rovers winning that game by 11 points, claiming the BDFA premiership.

In 1930, the club moved to the Federal Football Association (FFA). They finished 7th on the ladder in both of their seasons in the competition, and (after one more BDFA season in 1932) joined the Caulfield-Oakleigh District Football League (CODFL) in 1933.

=== VFA ===
In 1961, the club joined the newly-formed Division 2 in the Victorian Football Association (VFA). They changed their name to Waverley to better reflect their representation of the region, and adopted the "Panthers" nickname in 1963. They started strongly, winning half of their 18 matches that year, and then in 1963 finished runners up to Preston at Toorak Park. The club was promoted at short notice to the 1st Division in 1964 to fill the spot left after Moorabbin was suspended from the Association. In its first season in Division 1, the club survived relegation back to Division 2 by winning the last game of the season against their nemesis from the previous season, Preston.

The club's breakthrough year came in 1965 under the coaching of Ian Thorogood when, despite competing in just their second season in the top division, they claimed the premiership with a 12-point victory over Port Melbourne in the Grand Final at Port Melbourne's home ground. The following season they met again in the decider, but this time Port Melbourne was too strong. In 1970 they finished third, but in 1972 the club finished last and was relegated to Division 2, ending its nine-year stint in the top division.

The club struggled for support in Division 2, and was also hindered by the opening of VFL Park in nearby Mulgrave, as many locals preferred to watch the VFL game played at the ground every Saturday than watch the Panthers on a Sunday. In the mid-1970s when Association-wide crowds were averaging more than 4,500, Waverley still seldom drew more than 1,000 fans to games. The club was runner-up in Division 2 in 1981, and earned promotion to the expanded 12-team Division 1 for 1982, but returned to Division 2 in 1984 after two wooden spoons at the top level. Waverley was Division 2 runner-up in its final season, 1987, then abruptly folded one month before the 1988 season due to financial difficulties.

=== Amateurs return ===
After spending the 1988 season in recess, the club announced it would absorb the Clayton Amateurs Football Club, which had been competing in the Victorian Amateur Football Association (VAFA) since 1978.

Under the new name of Waverley Amateurs, the club entered the VAFA's F Section for the 1989 season.

In 1991, the club moved to the Eastern District Football League (EDFL) and reverted back to the "Waverley Football Club" name. The club was runners-up in the Division 4 grand finals in 1996 and 1997, while the EDFL became the Eastern Football League (EFL) at the end of the 1997 season.

=== Merger with Mount Waverley Burwood ===
The Mount Waverley Burwood Football Club was formed in 1994 and played in Division 1 of the Southern Football League (SFL). The club was formed as a merger of the Burwood Football Club (formerly Burwood United), which had played in the played in the Eastern Churches Football Association (ECFA) and South East Suburban Football League (SESFL), and the Mount Waverley Football Club, which played in the Federal League, OCDFL and SESFL.

During the 1998 season (the EDFL became the Eastern Football League (EFL) at the end of the 1997 season) the committees of Waverley and Mount Waverley Burwood discussed the possibility of merging to create a larger club that represented the Waverley district of the City of Monash. The merger was agreed on, and the new club − known as the Waverley Blues − entered the EFL in 1999.

== Honours ==
VFA premierships (1)

- 1st Division – 1965

Waverley 14.13 (97) d. Port Melbourne 10.25 (85)

J. J. Liston Trophies (2)

- Alan Poore – 1965, 1966

== Seasons ==
Premiers	Grand Finalist	Minor premiers	Finals appearance	Wooden spoon	VFA/VFL leading goalkicker	VFA/VFL best and fairest

=== Seniors ===
Year	League	Division	Finish	W	L	D	Coach	Captain	Best and fairest	Leading goalkicker	Goals	Ref
1908	MDFA	A Grade										
1909	MDFA	A Grade										
1910	MDFA	A Grade										
1911	MDFA	A Grade										
1912	MDFA	A Grade										
1913	MDFA	A Grade										
1914	MDFA	A Grade										
1915	MDFA	A Grade										
1916	MDFA	A Grade										
1917	MDFA	A Grade										
1918	MDFA	A Grade										
1919	MDFA	A Grade										
1920	MDFA	A Grade										
1921	MDFA	A Grade										
1922	MDFA	A Grade										
1923	MDFA	A Grade										
1924	MDFA	A Grade										
1925	SDFA	A Grade	8th	3	12	1						
1926	SDFA	A Grade	9th	2	14	0						
1927	BDFA	A Grade	3rd	8	6	0						
1928	BDFA	A Grade	1st	12	2	0						
1929	BDFA	A Grade	2nd	13	3	0						
1930	FFA		7th									
1931	FFA		7th									
1932	BDFA											
1933	CODFL											
1934	CODFL											
1935	CODFL											
1936	CODFL											
1937	CODFL											
1938	CODFL											
1939	CODFL											
1940	CODFL											
1941	CODFL											
1942	CODFL											
1943	CODFL											
1944	CODFL											
1945	CODFL											
1946	CODFL											
1947	CODFL											
1948	CODFL											
1949	CODFL											
1950	CODFL											
1951	CODFL											
1952	CODFL											
1953	CODFL											
1954	CODFL											
1955	CODFL											
1956	CODFL											
1957	CODFL											
1958	CODFL											
1959	CODFL											
1960	CODFL											
1961	VFA	Division 2					Don Scott	Don Scott				
1962	VFA	Division 2										
1963	VFA	Division 2										
1964	VFA	Division 1										
1965	VFA	Division 1					Ian Thorogood					
1966	VFA	Division 1										
1967	VFA	Division 1										
1968	VFA	Division 1										
1969	VFA	Division 1										
1970	VFA	Division 1										
1971	VFA	Division 1										
1972	VFA	Division 1										
1973	VFA	Division 2										
1974	VFA	Division 2										
1975	VFA	Division 2										
1976	VFA	Division 2										
1977	VFA	Division 2										
1978	VFA	Division 2										
1979	VFA	Division 2										
1980	VFA	Division 2								Paul Angelis	100	
1981	VFA	Division 2										
1982	VFA	Division 1					Laurie Fowler	Laurie Fowler				
1983	VFA	Division 1										
1984	VFA	Division 2										
1985	VFA	Division 2										
1986	VFA	Division 2										
1987	VFA	Division 2										
1988	VFA	Division 2	(In recess)									
1989	VAFA	F Section	7th	9	9	0	John Hartley					
1990	VAFA	F Section										
1991	EDFL	Division 4	3rd	10	6	0						
1992	EDFL	Division 4	2nd	12	6	0						
1993	EDFL	Division 4	4th	13	5	0						
1994	EDFL	Division 4										
1995	EDFL	Division 4										
1996	EDFL	Division 4	3rd	13	4	0						
1997	EDFL	Division 4	2nd	11	7	0						
1998	EFL	Division 4	5th	7	11	0						

== Notable players ==
- Russell Blew, Essendon dual premiership player
- Greg Brown, 1965 Essendon premiership team
- Alan Poore, had a stint at Collingwood
- Don R. Scott, inaugural VFA captain-coach
- Ray Shaw, Collingwood player and Copeland Trophy winner
- Kevin Morris, mercurial half forward flanker who went on to a successful career with Richmond and Collingwood Football Clubs
- Ralph Rogerson, South Australian and VFL state representative, Fitzroy (VFL) captain
- Alby Smedts, Footscry and St.Kilda
