= Lou Milner =

Australian rules footballer

Personal information
- Full name: Louis Milner
- Born: 20 March 1953 (age 73)
- Original teams: Pakenham, caulfield bears
- Height: 182 cm (6 ft 0 in)
- Weight: 76 kg (168 lb)

Playing career^{1}
Years	Club	Games (Goals)
1974	Hawthorn	1 (0)
- ^{1} Playing statistics correct to the end of 1974.

Louis Milner (born 20 March 1953) is a former Australian rules footballer who played with Hawthorn in the Victorian Football League (VFL).
