= John Clegg =

John Clegg may refer to:

- John Clegg (violinist) (1714–c. 1746), Irish violinist
- John Clegg (actor) (1934–2024), English actor
- John Clegg (archaeologist) (1935–2015), Australian archaeologist
- John Clegg (footballer) (1939–2011), Australian footballer

== See also ==
- Johnny Clegg (1953–2019), South African musician and anthropologist
- Jon Clegg (born 1970), British comedian
- Jono Clegg (born 1989), British rower
