= Ian Thorogood =

Australian rules footballer and coach (1936–2019)

Personal information
- Full name: Ian Albert Thorogood
- Born: 25 August 1936
- Died: 19 March 2019 (aged 82)
- Original team: Melbourne thirds
- Height: 183 cm (6 ft 0 in)
- Weight: 83 kg (183 lb)
- Position: Half back flank

Playing career^{1}
| Years | Club | Games (Goals) |
| 1957–1962 | Melbourne | 93 (1) |

Coaching career^{3}
| Years | Club | Games (W–L–D) |
| 1976–1977 | Carlton | 44 (29–14–1) |
- ^{1} Playing statistics correct to the end of 1962.^{3} Coaching statistics correct as of 1977.

Career highlights
- Melbourne premiership player 1957, 1959, 1960; Waverley premiership captain-coach, 1965

Ian Albert Thorogood (25 August 1936 – 19 March 2019) was an Australian rules footballer who played and coached in the Victorian Football League (VFL).

== Biography ==
Thorogood played for Melbourne, including three premiership teams. In 1963, he went to the Waverley Football Club in the Victorian Football Association, and he coached the club to its sole Division 1 premiership in 1965. He was also responsible for giving the club its nickname, the Panthers. He moved on to become assistant coach of South Melbourne in 1970.

He joined the Carlton Football Club as assistant coach in 1976, but took over the senior coaching position when John Nicholls resigned at the beginning of the season. He coached the club for the 1976 and 1977 seasons.

Thorogood died at age 82 on 19 March 2019.
