= Ian Nankervis (footballer, born 1944) =

Australian rules footballer

Personal information
- Full name: Ian Desmond Nankervis
- Born: 13 March 1944 (age 82); Bendigo, Victoria
- Original team: Mildura Imperials
- Height: 170 cm (5 ft 7 in)
- Weight: 67 kg (148 lb)

Playing career^{1}
Years	Club	Games (Goals)
1964–66	Carlton	27 (24)
1967–68	Williamstown (VFA)	28 (77)
1969–70	Dandenong (VFA)	31 (76)
- ^{1} Playing statistics correct to the end of 1970.

Ian Desmond Nankervis (born 13 March 1944) is a former Australian rules footballer who played with Carlton in the Victorian Football League (VFL).

Following his departure from Carlton, Nankervis played for Williamstown in the Victorian Football Association. He won the Division 2 Best and Fairest award (now known as the J. Field Medal) in 1968; but, this caused a dispute with the club when he tried to use it as leverage to get a better pay deal, and it resulted in his being dropped from that year's Grand Final team. He later played for Dandenong.
