= Graham Dunscombe =

Australian rules footballer (1924–2020)

Personal information
- Full name: Graham Dunscombe
- Born: 7 July 1924; Thornbury, Victoria
- Died: 13 September 2020 (aged 96)
- Original team: Sandringham
- Height: 168 cm (5 ft 6 in)
- Weight: 72 kg (159 lb)

Playing career^{1}
Years	Club	Games (Goals)
1946–47	Sandringham (VFA)	3 (0)
1947	North Melbourne	5 (1)
- ^{1} Playing statistics correct to the end of 1947.

Graham Dunscombe (7 July 1924 – 13 September 2020) was an Australian rules footballer who played for North Melbourne in the Victorian Football League (VFL).

== Family ==
The son of Charles Ernest Kingsman Dunscombe (1891–1978), and Rose Susannah Dunscombe (1892–1984), née Graham, Graham Dunscombe was born at Thornbury, Victoria on 7 July 1924.

He married Phyllis Ida "Peggy" Stewart in 1954, and they had two children, Roger, and Pamela.

== Military service ==
Prior to his football career, Dunscombe served in Papua New Guinea with the Australian Army during World War II.

== Football ==
Originally from Victorian Football Association (VFA) club Sandringham, Dunscombe made five appearances for North Melbourne in the 1947 VFL season before returning to the VFA.

He coached Moorabbin to the VFA premiership in 1963, after replacing Bob Wilkie as coach mid-season. From 1965 to 1967, Dunscombe coached VFA club Prahran, taking them to a Division 2 premiership in 1966; then from 1968 to 1968 coached the VFA's Mordialloc.
