= Ron Tenabel =

Australian rules footballer

Personal information
- Full name: Quirinus Jan Tenabel
- Born: 14 January 1945 (age 81)
- Original team: Newtown & Chilwell
- Height: 188 cm (6 ft 2 in)
- Weight: 85 kg (187 lb)

Playing career^{1}
| Years | Club | Games (Goals) |
| 1965–1967 | South Melbourne | 17 (0) |
- ^{1} Playing statistics correct to the end of 1967.

Quirinus Jan "Ron" Tenabel (born 14 January 1945) is a former Australian rules footballer who played with South Melbourne in the Victorian Football League (VFL).

== Career ==
Originally from Newtown & Chilwell, Tenabel spent his first few years playing for the Geelong reserves and was a member of their 1963 and 1964 premiership teams.

Unable to make it in the seniors with Geelong, Tenabel made his way to South Melbourne and made seven league appearances in the 1965 VFL season. He played three games in 1966, followed by another seven in 1967, before leaving for Geelong West.

Tenabel had a memorable first season at Geelong West in 1968. A follower in the club's Division Two premiership team, he kicked three goals in the grand final win over Williamstown and also won Geelong West's best and fairest award. He then captain-coached the club in the 1969 VFA season.

He coached Newtown & Chilwell in 1973, 1974 and 1980.
