= Don Scott (footballer, born 1929) =

Australian rules footballer (born 1929)

Personal information
- Full name: Donald Rex Scott
- Born: 5 November 1929 (age 96)
- Original team: West Perth
- Height: 188 cm (6 ft 2 in)
- Weight: 88 kg (194 lb)
- Position: Ruckman/Defender

Playing career^{1}
Years	Club	Games (Goals)
1950–54	South Melbourne	83 (58)
- ^{1} Playing statistics correct to the end of 1954.

Donald Rex Scott (born 5 November 1929) is a former Australian rules footballer who played with South Melbourne in the Victorian Football League (VFL) during the early 1950s.

Scott played mostly as a ruckman or in defence over the course of his career, which began in 1948 at West Perth. In his first season, he was selected in the Western Australian interstate team and took part in two victories over Victoria.

His VFL stint lasted five seasons, with South Melbourne failing to make the finals in each. He returned to West Perth as captain-coach in 1955 and the following year crossed to Swan Districts where he had the same role.

Scott joined Waverley as their inaugural captain-coach when they joined the VFA for the 1961 competition and kicked 57 goals in his first season.
