= John Clegg (footballer) =

Australian rules footballer (1939–2011)

Personal information
- Full name: John Clegg
- Born: 18 June 1939
- Died: 1 August 2011 (aged 72)
- Original team: Kingsville
- Height: 163 cm (5 ft 4 in)
- Weight: 70 kg (154 lb)

Playing career^{1}
Years	Club	Games (Goals)
1958–60	Footscray	24 (14)
- ^{1} Playing statistics correct to the end of 1960.

John Clegg (18 June 1939 – 1 August 2011) was an Australian rules footballer who played for Footscray in the Victorian Football League (VFL).

Clegg, a Kingsville recruit, was one of the smallest players of his era. He spent three seasons at Footscray before ending up at Yarraville where he won the J. J. Liston Trophy in 1963.
