= Sunshine Football Club (VFA) =

Names
- Full name: Sunshine Football Club
- Nickname(s): Crows, Shiners
- Former nickname: Panthers

Club details
- Founded: 1938
- Dissolved: 25 October 1989
- Colours: Navy blue White
- Competition: Footscray District FL (1938–1958); Metropolitan League (1951–1958); Victorian Football Association (1959–1989)
- Premierships: FDFL – B Grade: 1946; Metropolitan – 1951; VFA – Div 2: 1971
- Ground: Selwyn Park (until 1965); Skinner Reserve (1966–1989)

Uniforms
Home

The Sunshine Football Club, nicknamed the Crows, was an Australian rules football club which played in the Victorian Football Association (VFA) from 1959 until 1989.

== History ==
=== Early years ===
Formed in 1938 as the Sunshine Districts Football Club, the club had to differentiate from the Sunshine Football Club that was competing in the VFL Sub-Districts. The original Sunshine went into recess after the 1940 season. The district club managed to remain viable during the war (WWII) competing in the Footscray District League. In 1946 the club won the B grade Grand Final and was Runners-up in the A Grade grand final in 1949.

Sunshine was a large football club in a strong growth area of Melbourne's west. In 1950 it was approached and agreed to field a team in the new Metropolitan Football League (MFL) whilst maintaining a side in the lower grades of the FDFL. It won the Metropolitan 1951 premiership and was runners-up in 1952, 1955, and 1958. By 1958, it operated two teams in the MFL and three teams in the FDFL and had more than 200 registered players.

=== VFA ===
From the early 1950s, it had actively sought admission to the Victorian Football Association; and it was admitted at short notice just before the 1959 VFA season, as a direct result of the sudden expulsion of the Prahran Football Club. It abandoned its blue and white hooped guernsey (which clashed with Moorabbin), and adopted a navy blue guernsey with a white yoke. Concentrating on the VFA, the club withdrew its teams from the FDFL.

Upon its admission to the VFA, the club played its home games at Selwyn Park, before moving to Skinner Reserve, Braybrook, in 1966.

In 1962, the club adopted Panthers as its nickname, but it did not make any particular effort in promoting the nickname to the wider public. This caused a dispute in 1963, when Waverley adopted Panthers as its nickname, and spent around £100 promoting it before discovering that Sunshine was already using the name. Sunshine ultimately abandoned the Panthers nickname and replaced it with Crows, which became its official nickname for the remainder of its time in the VFA.

Initially unsuccessful, Sunshine moved into Division 2 when the competition was partitioned in 1961. They first competed in the finals in 1963, and the following season claimed the minor premiership, losing to Geelong West in the Grand Final in an upset. The club also lost the 1969 Grand Final, this time to Williamstown, before finally becoming premiers in 1971, to conclude Sunshine's ninth successive finals series. Under captain-coach Don McKenzie, Sunshine defeated Brunswick by 54 points in the decider and earned promotion to Division One for the first time. Sunshine spent three years in the top division before being relegated.

Sunshine fell to the bottom half of the Division 2 ladder in the late 1970s, and the early 1980s saw Sunshine endure one of the worst prolonged stretches of performances by a club in VFA history: from 1981 to 1984, the club won two wooden spoons and won only seven games. The club improved dramatically in 1985 under coach Ron Brown, winning the Division 2 minor premiership in 1986 and reaching but losing Grand Finals in 1986 and 1988.

=== Withdrawal from VFA ===
The Association contracted to a single division in 1989, and the financially struggling Sunshine was completely uncompetitive against the former Division 1 clubs. The club withdrew its firsts and seconds teams from the competition after Round 9 (it continued to field an under-19s team) with plans to regroup for the 1990 season. However, the club and VFA realised there was no realistic prospect of the club being viable or competitive, and Sunshine dropped out of the VFA and folded on 25 October 1989. The club's eight senior and reserves matches in the 1989 season were expunged from the VFA records.

An attempt to reform the Sunshine club in 1993 failed to attract enough players. The old VFA club has no ties with the current Sunshine Football Club (previously known as Sunshine YCW Football Club), which is now playing in the Western Region Football League but it does have ties with Albion Football Club as AFC was its Thirds team before it ventured out on its own in 1961.

== Honours ==
VFA 2nd Division Premierships (1)

- 1971

J. J. Liston Trophy winners (2)

- Don McKenzie (1972)
- Ray Goold (1974)

J. Field Medal winners (3)

- Pat Fitzgerald (1961)
- Shaun Crosbie (1964)
- Mark Williams (1982)

VFA Leading Goalkicker 2nd Division

- George Allen (1969, 1970); died of heart failure in a practice match at Benalla in 1971, aged 22.

== VFA Club Records ==
Highest Score	37.26 (248) v Caulfield, Round 7, 1987, Princes Park (Caulfield)
Lowest Score	2.1 (13) v Box Hill, Round 16, 1984, Box Hill City Oval
Greatest Winning Margin	182 points v Camberwell, Round 4, 1969, Skinner Reserve
Greatest Losing Margin	290 points v Waverley, Round 1, 1981, Central Reserve
Lowest Winning Score	2.8 (20) v Box Hill 2.4 (16), Round 13, 1963, Selwyn Park
Highest Losing Score	23.8 (146) v Camberwell 23.15 (153), Round 10, 1976, Camberwell Sportsground

== Books ==
- Stoward, J. History of football in Melbourne's north west ISBN 9780980592924
- Fiddian, M. A History of the Victorian Football Association 1877 - 1995
