= Moorabbin Football Club =

Australian-rules football club

Names
- Full name: Moorabbin Football Club
- Nickname(s): Kangaroos

Club details
- Founded: c. 1909
- Dissolved: July 1965
- Colours: Royal Blue White
- Competition: Federal Football League (1909–1950); Victorian Football Association (1951–1963)
- Premierships: VFA (2): 1957; 1963; FFL (12): 1914; 1926; 1927; 1930; 1931; 1933; 1940; 1941; 1945; 1946; 1947; 1948
- Ground(s): Moorabbin Oval

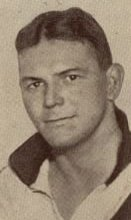
Bill Faul, 1957 premiership coach

The Moorabbin Football Club, nicknamed the Kangaroos, was an Australian rules football club best known for its premiership success in the Victorian Football Association (VFA) during the 1950s and 1960s. During their time in the VFA, the club played its home matches at Moorabbin Oval and wore blue and white hooped guernseys. It previously achieved success in the Federal Football League, winning 12 premierships.

== History ==
=== Federal Football League (1909–1950) ===
The club initially played in the Federal Football League (FFL), making their debut in 1909 and competing until 1950. The club wore a black and white striped jumper in the style of Collingwood. During this time the club won 12 premierships, including winning all six premierships staged over the nine years between 1940 and 1948 (the FFL was in recess from 1942 until 1944).

=== Switch to VFA (1951–1959) ===
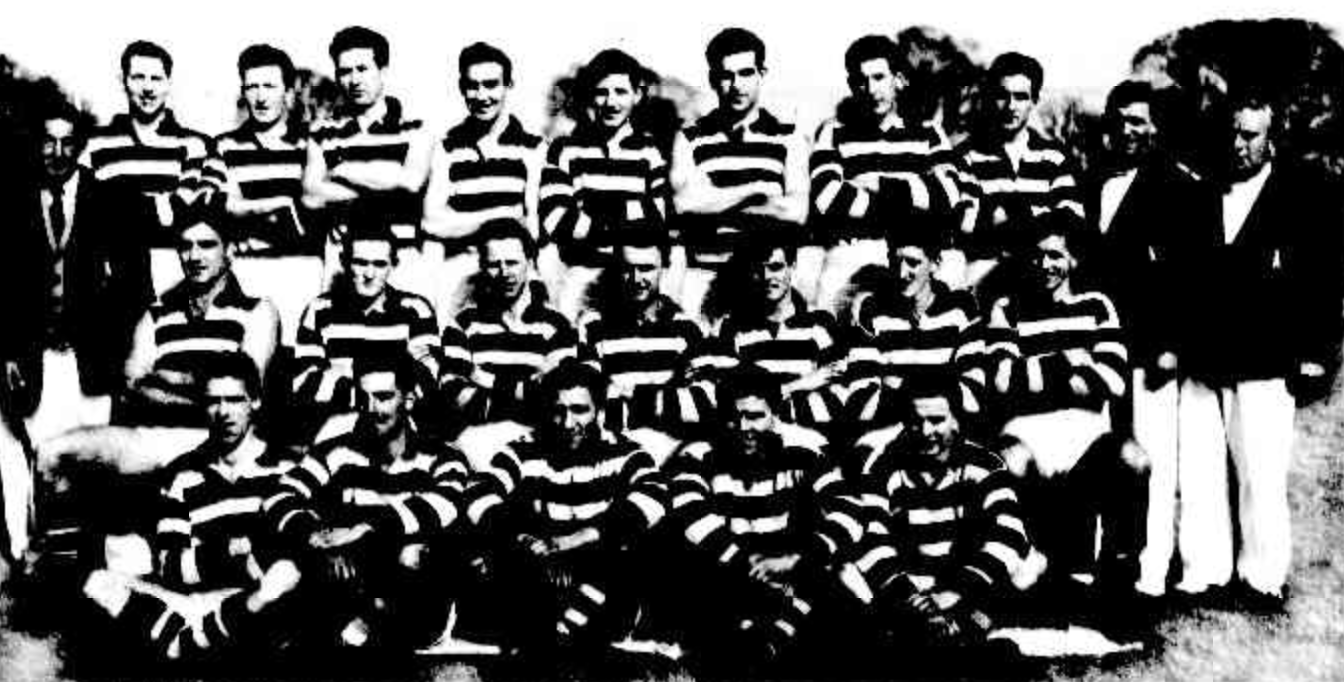
Moorabbin players in 1954

The club entered the Victorian Football Association (VFA) in 1951. A clash of jumpers with Brunswick meant the team had to change its colours, and so chose blue and white. The club's Federal League home ground, Dane Road Reserve, was not up to VFA standards; so, in 1951 the club played at Cheltenham, and in 1952 moved into Moorabbin Oval, which the Moorabbin Council had developed during 1951.

The Kangaroos made the 1954 and 1955 finals series without success, but in 1957 they helped eliminate premiership favourite Williamstown after defeating them by two points in the semi-final. Moorabbin, who were coached by Bill Faul, took on Port Melbourne in the grand final, whom they had not once beaten since joining the league. In another upset, Moorabbin won comfortably to claim their maiden VFA premiership.

In 1958, Moorabbin reached the grand final once more, but were forced to return the following weekend after drawing with Williamstown. The replay was won by Williamstown, the first and only instance of a grand final replay in the VFA.

=== More premiership success (1960–1963) ===
By the 1960s, the club was one of the strongest both on and off the field in the VFA. Its 1962 match payments to players of £12 for a win and £6 for a loss were the highest in Association history. The club was minor premier in three consecutive years from 1961 until 1963, and reached the 1962 and 1963 grand finals. It lost in remarkable fashion to Sandringham in 1962 – despite trailing by 44 points at three-quarter-time, Sandringham put on an eight-goal final quarter to win by a single point. Moorabbin exacted its revenge the following year, beating Sandringham twice in the finals in 1963, including a 64-point win in the grand final under coach Graham Dunscombe, who was appointed mid-season.

=== Suspension and disbandment (1964–1965) ===
In the early 1960s, the Moorabbin Council was very keen to bring a Victorian Football League (VFL) team to Moorabbin Oval. The council was the main driving force, but the extent to which the club supported the council in its ambitions put the club in dispute with the VFA over its loyalty. In November 1963, Moorabbin survived by a single vote a motion to have it expelled from the Association over its role in the council's approaches that year to VFL clubs Richmond and Fitzroy. Then, in March 1964, the council secured a deal with St Kilda, who moved to Moorabbin Oval starting in 1965; although the club had not been involved in negotiations, it publicly pledged its support for the council, and was suspended from the Association for its disloyalty by a 30–12 vote on 3 April, less than three weeks from the start of the season. The club originally intended to seek readmission for the 1965 season, but in July the club committee decided to withdraw permanently from the Association, and disbanded.

== Honours ==
VFA premierships (2)

- 1957, 1963

J. J. Liston Trophy winners (1)

- Les Moroney (1955)

Federal Football League premierships (12)

- 1914, 1926, 1927, 1930, 1931, 1933, 1940, 1941, 1945, 1946, 1947, 1948.
