= Caulfield Football Club =

Names
- Full name: Caulfield Football Club
- Nickname: Bears

Club details
- Founded: 1965; 61 years ago
- Dissolved: 1988; 38 years ago (merged to form Ashburton-Caulfield FC, dissolved 1989)
- Colours: Blue White
- Competition: Victorian Football Association (1965–87)
- Ground: Princes Park

Uniforms
Home

The Caulfield Football Club, nicknamed Bears, was an Australian rules football club based in the Melbourne suburb of Caulfield South.

It competed in the Victorian Football Association (VFA) from 1965 until 1987, when the club folded due to financial difficulties.

== History ==
=== Origins ===
On 29 March 1962, the South Caulfield Football Club from the Federal District Football League merged with the Victorian Football Association's struggling Brighton Football Club which could barely field a team and had been evicted from its home ground at Elsternwick Park to form a club known as "Brighton-Caulfield". The merged club was based at South Caulfield's home ground at Princes Park on Hawthorn Rd, Caulfield. Caulfield City Council wanted a VFA club in its municipality but not without the municipality name.

=== Caulfield formation ===
In 1965, after three seasons of competing as Brighton-Caulfield, the club with pressure from the Caulfield council, severed all links to its former Brighton identity, and became known as the Caulfield Football Club. The club adopted a new guernsey of white with navy blue hoops, and adopted Bears as a new nickname.

=== VFA ===
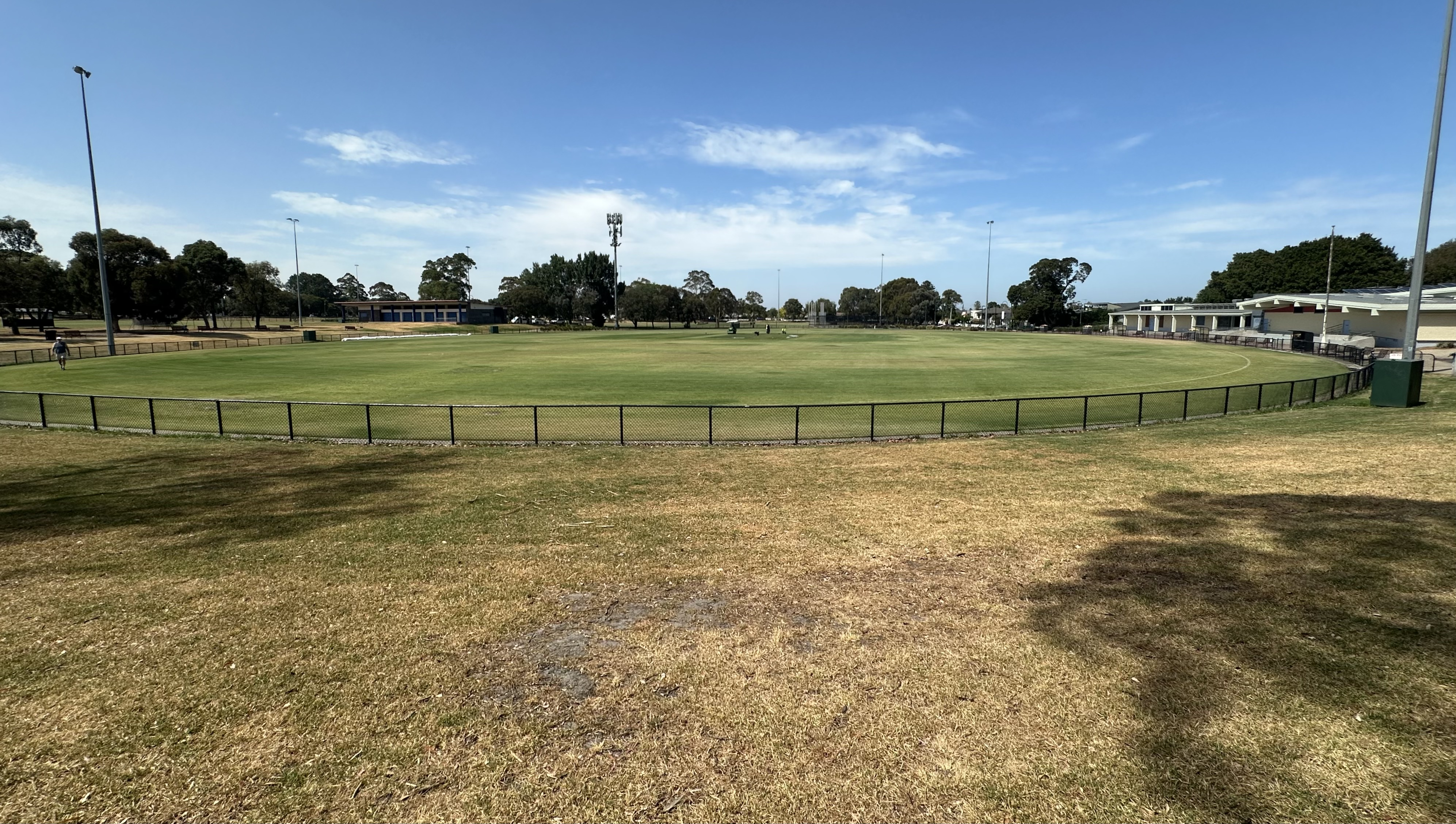
Princes Park in Caulfield South, the Caulfield Football Club's home ground

Caulfield initially played in the second division and failed to make the finals during the rest of the 1960s. In 1971 they managed to lure former Richmond premiership player Tony Jewell to coach the club. They also recruited his teammates Paddy Guinane and Neville Crowe to the playing group. With VFL players in the team they had immediate success, topping the second division ladder and losing just three games in the home and away season. Caulfield however lost their preliminary final and thus missed out on playing in the grand final. They went one better the following season and made it to the decider which they lost to Geelong West in the last minute; the Geelong club had been unbeaten all season, but Caulfield put up a fight, leading by 12 points at three-quarter time.

In 1973, the club won its first and only premiership, defeating Brunswick 18.20 (128) to 14.22 (106) in the grand final; full forward John Logan kicked six goals. This victory earned the promotion to the first division, where it competed for eight years. In its time in the top division, the club reached the finals once, in 1976; and, in 1977 it won the lightning premiership and was runner-up in the Centenary Cup.

At the end of 1981, Caulfield was demoted to Division 2 as part of a restructure of the Association's two-division system, in large part because of its substandard playing facilities. In its first season back in Division 2, the club reached the grand final, losing to Northcote by five points. The club endured financial difficulties through the 1980s, and it was eventually suspended from the Association after the 1987 season, due to having falling $11,000 behind on affiliation levies.

In 1988 the club merged with local club Ashburton to form Caulfield-Ashburton Football Club, and won the premiership in the South East Suburban FL first division; but, the club was suspended shortly before the 1989 season after it sent an abusive letter to the league secretary, and folded permanently.

== Other clubs ==
Caulfield is not to be confused with:

- Caulfield Football Club (1983−1984), which competed in the SESFL
- Caulfield Amateur Football Club (1946−1971)
- Caulfield City Football Club (1924−1959), formerly known as Caulfield
- Caulfield District Football Club (1939−1955)
- East Caulfield Football Club (1890s−1976), formerly known as Caulfield
- East Caulfield Football Club (1935−1951), which competed in the ESFL and VAFA

== Notable players ==
- Neville Crowe (Richmond)
- Paddy Guinane (Richmond)
- Tony Jewell (Richmond)
- Darren Kappler (Fitzroy/Hawthorn/Sydney)
- Lou Milner (Hawthorn)
