= Toorak Park =

Sports venue in Armadale, Victoria

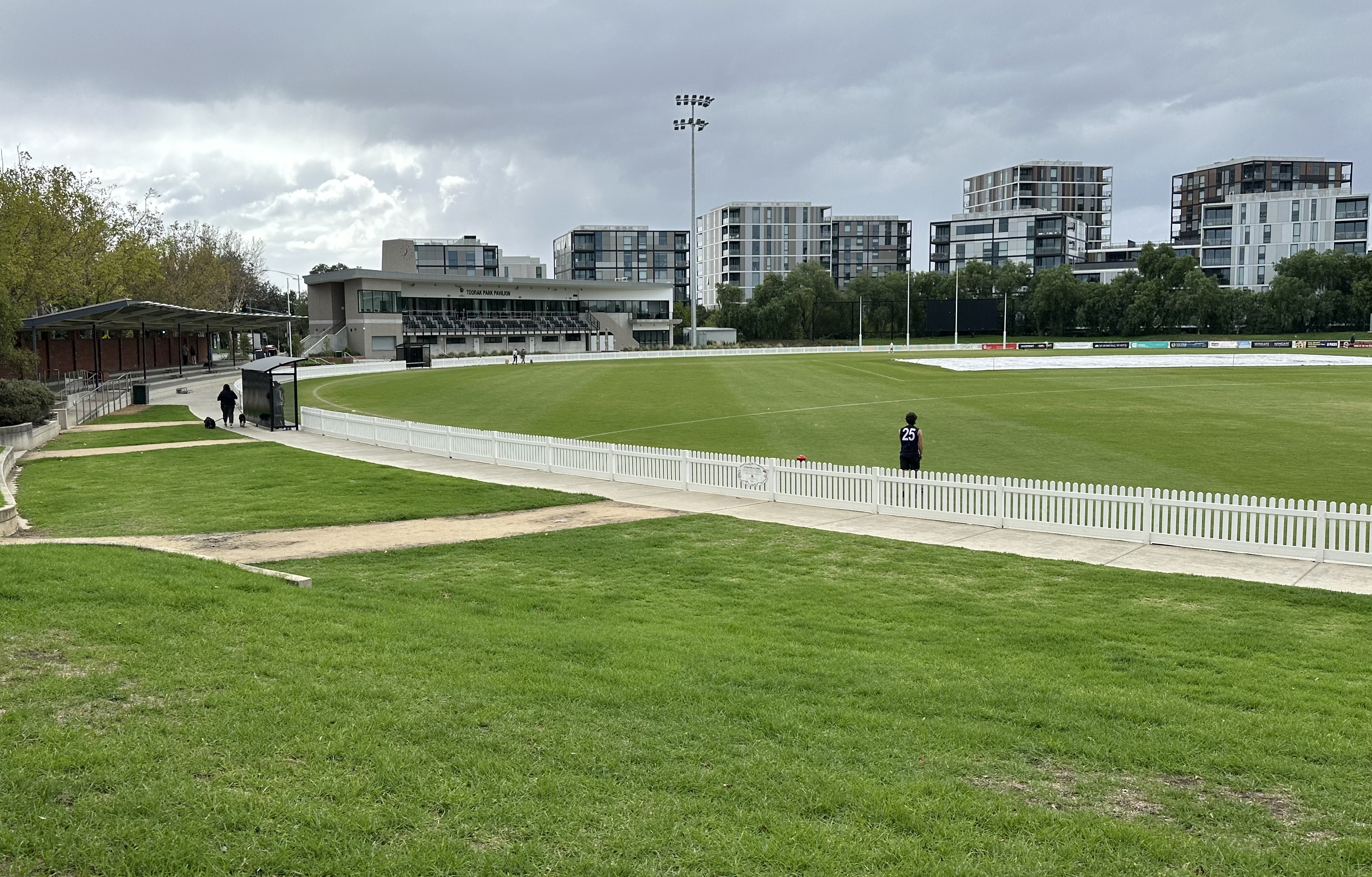
- Toorak Park in April 2026
- Interactive map of Toorak Park
- Former names: Hawksburn Cricket Ground
- Location: Armadale, Victoria
- Coordinates: 37°51′10″S 145°0′45″E
- Owner: City of Stonnington
- Capacity: 5,000 (seated)
- Surface: Grass
- Field size: 160 m × 125 m

Construction
- Opened: 1893

Tenant
- Prahran Football Club (winter); Old Xaverians Football Club (winter); Prahran Cricket Club (summer); Melbourne Rugby Club (social facilities only)

Toorak Park is an Australian rules football and cricket venue located in the Melbourne suburb of Armadale.

The ground hosted four Victorian Football Association (VFA) grand finals in the 1930s, before later serving as the primary finals venue for Division 2 of the VFA between 1961 and 1984. It also hosted thirteen Victorian Football League (VFL) matches during World War II.

As of 2026, is the home of the Prahran Football Club and Old Xaverians Football Club in the Victorian Amateur Football Association (VAFA) and the Prahran Cricket Club in the Victorian Premier Cricket (VPC) competition.

== History ==
Toorak Park opened in 1893 when it was used by Hawksburn Cricket Club (later Prahran). The Prahran Football Club in the Victorian Football Association began home matches at the venue in 1899, and used it as its home base until it left the Association after 1994. Old Xaverians moved there for the 1995 VAFA season and now share the oval with Prahran, which now also plays in the VAFA.

Toorak Park hosted four VFA Grand Finals between 1935 and 1938, and served as the finals venue (including Grand Finals) for the VFA Division 2 from 1961 until 1984, except in 1967. The ground record attendance for a football match is approximately 17,000, for the 1938 VFA Grand Final between Brunswick and Brighton.

During World War II, several venues used by the Victorian Football League teams were commandeered for military use. The VFA was in recess during World War II, so the St Kilda Football Club, whose Junction Oval was one of the commandeered venues, temporarily moved to Toorak Park, using it as a home base in 1942 and 1943. South Melbourne also played one home match there in 1942. Altogether, Toorak Park hosted thirteen VFL matches. The highest attendance recorded for a VFL match was 11,000 at the St Kilda vs Richmond match, round 3 of 1943.

In 1959, the Prahran Council leased the ground to the Victorian Rugby Union on alternate Saturdays (when the Prahran Football Club firsts team was playing away) for the considerable sum at the time of £660, the Prahran Football Club paid only £60 to rent the ground for the whole winter. The VFA rules required that all clubs have access to the same ground throughout the winter, so that the seconds could play home when the firsts played away; as a result, Prahran was expelled from the VFA for that season. The football club secured a winter-long lease in 1960 and returned to the association.

The Grandstand was replaced in 2024 with a double story pavilion with a function room, change rooms and seating for 150 spectators. At the same time the lighting system was replaced with LEDs.
