= Kew Football Club =

Names
- Full name: Kew Football Club
- Nickname: Bears
- Motto: Vigore Honoreque ("With vigor and honor")

2024 season
- After finals: VAFA: N/A; VAFAW: 4th
- Home-and-away season: VAFA: 6th VAFAW: 3rd
- Leading goalkicker: VAFA: Ned Waters (42); VAFAW: Dakota Villiva (19)
- Best and fairest: VAFA: Max Waters; VAFAW: Dakota Villiva

Club details
- Founded: 1876; 150 years ago
- Colours: Brown Gold
- Competition: VAFA: Division 1 VAFAW: Premier
- Coach: VAFA: Jack Cole; VAFAW: Emily Avery
- Captain(s): VAFA: Max Waters; VAFAW: Rachel McDonough
- Premierships: VAFA (9): 1950; 1953; 1962; 1964; 1966; 1979; 2013; 2014; 2015
- Ground: J.J. Higgins Reserve

Uniforms
Home

Other information
- Official website: kewfc.com

The Kew Football Club, nicknamed the Bears, is an Australian rules football club based in the Melbourne suburb of Kew. As of 2025, the club's men's team competes in Division 1 of the Victorian Amateur Football Association (VAFA), while the women's team is in the Premier Division of the VAFA Women's (VAFAW) competition.

== History ==
=== Early years ===
Kew was founded in 1876 and won its first premiership in 1880 in the second-rate ranks of the Hawthorn District Zone competition. The club entered a first-rate league for the first time in 1889 when it joined the Victorian Junior Football Association (VJFA), finishing 20th with two wins and six draws.

The club withdrew during the 1891 season after failing to win a game, and dropped down to the 2nd rate and 3rd rate ranks of the VJFA. The club continued in the Association until 1896, when the VJFA mandated that all clubs must play on a fenced oval. As Victoria Park was unfenced, the club withdrew from the VJFA and "reluctantly" went into recess for two years.

In 1899, Kew returned and entered the Suburban Junior Football Association (SJFA). However, in May of that year, Metropolitan Junior Football Association (MJFA) club St Francis Xavier disbanded. Kew was chosen to fill the vacancy, and it played in the MJFA for the remainder of the 1899 season.

=== RDFA and VJFA return ===
Following the 1900 season, Kew left the MJFA and joined another competition, also known as the MJFA. (Note: In 1900, the Metropolitan Junior Football Association (MJFA, now VAFA) decided on a change of name to the Metropolitan Football Association (MFA). MJFA president Lawrence Adamson brokered a deal that the existing MFA (of 1899) became the MJFA, giving his MJFA (of 1892) the "Metropolitan Football Association" name. Despite this, various newspaper reports from 1900 until 1912 still use the MJFA name when referring to Adamson's competition, most consensus is that "MJFA" in this time period refers to the now-VAFA, and the VAFA's official history continues to use the MJFA name until 1912.) They joined the Reporter District Football Association (RDFA) in 1911, withdrawing mid-season in 1915 because of a loss of players due to World War I enlistments, but resumed when the RDFA returned after the war in 1919.

Kew returned to the VJFA in 1920. The club was winless in its return season, but eventually rose up the ladder and finished sixth with 10 wins in 1926. Kew also applied for admittance into the Victorian Football Association (VFA) when Brunswick was temporarily excluded, but although VFA officials were "greatly impressed" with the club's home ground and surroundings, its application was unsuccessful and Brunswick remained in the VFA for the 1927 season.

At the time, the VJFA was also transitioning to become a reserves competition for the VFA, and as Kew was not a VFA member, it left the VJFA.

=== VFL Sub-Districts ===
For the 1927 season, Kew entered the Victorian Football League (VFL) Sub-Districts, and won the premiership in its first year in the competition. Further premierships came in 1929, 1931, 1932, and 1934, and the club ultimately made finals in all but five of its 18 seasons in the Sub-Districts. In 1935, Kew drew with Fairfield in the grand final. The replay was won by Fairfield, with the game resulting in four players being suspended for fighting.

Kew also had an autonomous reserves team, the Kew Junior Football Club, which was formed in 1922 and won a premiership in the Eastern Suburban Junior Football Association (ESJFA) in 1925. The juniors entered the Metropolitan Amateur Football Association (MAFA, formerly MJFA) in 1926 and was renamed to Kew District Football Club, before joining the VFL Sub-Districts in 1927 and winning premierships in 1928, 1929, and 1930. Kew District joined the Eastern Suburban Football League (ESFL) in 1934 but folded in 1938 after an unsuccessful finals campaign in 1937.

=== VAFA return ===
In 1949, amid "unruly behaviour" from a majority of other Sub-Districts clubs, Kew left and returned to the MJFA/MAFA, which had been renamed to the Victorian Amateur Football Association (VAFA) in 1933. The club was ranked very highly by the VAFA Executive, and was admitted into C Section instead of the lower D Section for its return season.

Kew won the 1949 minor premiership and was set to be automatically promoted to B Section, but after a round 18 victory over East Caulfield, an anonymous caller to VAFA headquarters stated Kew was fielding an ineligible player who had fought as a professional boxer during his army service in World War II. Kew was stripped of the eight games he played in, along with their place in the finals series, and remained in C Section for the 1950 season.

In 1950, Kew were undefeated and won the premiership, earning a promotion to B Section for 1951. The B Section grand final was won in 1953, and Kew entered A Section for the first time in 1954.

Further premierships followed in 1962, 1964 (C Section) and 1966 (B Section). However, with the exception of the 1979 (C Section), Kew was unable to find further premiership success. By the 1990s, the club had fallen to D Section for the first time in its history, and fell all the way down to Division 4 (F Section) in 2004.

=== 21st century ===
In 2007, the North Kew Football Club amalgamated with Kew. North Kew was formed in 1932 and had been competing in the Southern Football League (SFL) prior to the merger.

Former Carlton footballer Ian Aitken was appointed Kew senior coach in 2011. He led the club to a three-peat in 2013, 2014 and 2015, before leaving at the end of the 2016 season. Aitken returned in 2019 and remained in the role until the end of the 2023 season.

Kew entered two women's in the Victorian Women's Football League (VWFL) in 2014. Dwindling squad numbers meant one of the sides withdrew after round 7, while the other able to continue and ended up as runners-up in the grand final. 2015 saw another successful year on the field, with the Women’s team Runners-Up again in the VWFL. In 2016, the Kew Women went one better and won the club’s first women’s premiership in Division 1 of the VWFL. The women's sides entered the Northern Football League (NFL) in 2017, then the VAFA Women's (VAFAW) in 2018, where it continues to compete in the Premier Division.

Former Collingwood footballer and longtime local football coach Bryan 'Jack' Cole was appointed as Kew's men's senior coach for the 2024 season, and continues to serve in the role as of 2025.

== Seasons ==
Premiers	Grand Finalist	Minor premiers	Finals appearance	Wooden spoon	Division leading goalkicker	Division best and fairest

=== Men's ===
==== Seniors ====
Year	League	Division	Finish	W	L	D	Coach	Captain	Terry Hayes Medal (Best and fairest)	Leading goalkicker		Ref
1876												
1877												
1878												
1879												
1880	HDZ	2nd rate										
1881												
1882												
1883												
1884												
1885												
1886												
1887												
1888												
1889	VJFA	1st rate	20th	2	6	11						
1890	VJFA	1st rate	23rd	3	12	4						
1891	VJFA	1st rate	24th	−	−	−						
1892	VJFA											
1893	VJFA											
1894	VJFA											
1895	VJFA											
1896	VJFA											
1897	N/A	(In recess)										
1898	N/A	(In recess)										
1899	MJFA											
1900	MJFA		7th	2	14	0						
1901												
1902												
1903												
1904												
1905												
1906												
1907												
1908												
1909												
1910												
1911	RDFA											
1912	RDFA	A Section	2nd	8	2	0						
1913	RDFA	A Grade	4th	13	4	1						
1914	RDFA	A Grade	2nd	10	4	0						
1915	RDFA	A Grade	6th	6	5	0						
1916	RDFA	(No season due to World War I)										
1917	RDFA	(No season due to World War I)										
1918	RDFA	(No season due to World War I)										
1919	RDFA	A Grade	2nd	10	5	9						
1920	VJFA											
1921	VJFA		9th	3	13	1						
1922	VJFA		8th	4	14	0						
1923	VJFA		9th	6	13	0						
1924	VJFA	Division 1	5th	7	9	0						
1925	VJFA											
1926	VJFA											
1927	VFLSD	Division 1										
1928	VFLSD	Division 1										
1929	VFLSD	Division 1										
1930	VFLSD	Division 1										
1931	VFLSD	Division 1	1st									
1932	VFLSD	Division 1										
1933	VFLSD	Division 1										
1934	VFLSD	Division 1										
1935	VFLSD	Division 1										
1936	VFLSD											
1937	VFLSD											
1938	VFLSD											
1939	VFLSD											
1940	VFLSD											
1941	VFLSD											
1942	VFLSD											
1943	VFLSD											
1944	VFLSD											
1945	VFLSD											
1946	VFLSD											
1947	VFLSD											
1948	VFLSD											
1949	VAFA											
1950	VAFA											
1951	VAFA											
1952	VAFA											
1953	VAFA											
1954	VAFA											
1955	VAFA											
1956	VAFA											
1957	VAFA											
1958	VAFA											
1959	VAFA											
1960	VAFA											
1961	VAFA											
1962	VAFA											
1963	VAFA											
1964	VAFA											
1965	VAFA											
1966	VAFA											
1967	VAFA											
1968	VAFA											
1969	VAFA											
1970	VAFA	B Section	6th									
1971	VAFA	B Section										
1972	VAFA	B Section	6th									
1973	VAFA	B Section										
1974	VAFA	B Section										
1975	VAFA	B Section	10th									
1976	VAFA	C Section	8th									
1977	VAFA	C Section	7th									
1978	VAFA	C Section	8th									
1979	VAFA	C Section										
1980	VAFA	B Section										
1981	VAFA	B Section										
1982	VAFA	B Section										
1983	VAFA	B Section	3rd									
1984	VAFA	A Section	10th									
1985	VAFA	B Section										
1986	VAFA	C Section	6th									
1987	VAFA	C Section	1st	17	1	0				Matthew Cavanagh	72	
1988	VAFA	B Section	1st									
1989	VAFA	A Section	10th									
1990	VAFA	B Section										
1991	VAFA	B Section	10th									
1992	VAFA	C Section										
1993	VAFA	C Section										
1994	VAFA											
1995	VAFA											
1996	VAFA	D Section										
1997	VAFA	E East	3rd									
1998	VAFA	E White	3rd									
1999	VAFA											
2000	VAFA	Division 2										
2001	VAFA	Division 2	6th									
2002	VAFA	Division 2	10th									
2003	VAFA	Division 3										
2004	VAFA	Division 4	2nd									
2005	VAFA	Division 3	6th									
2006	VAFA	Division 3	7th									
2007	VAFA	Division 3	10th									
2008	VAFA	Division 4										
2009	VAFA	Division 4										
2010	VAFA	Division 3										
2011	VAFA	Division 3	8th				Ian Aitken					
2012	VAFA	Division 3					Ian Aitken					
2013	VAFA	Division 3	1st				Ian Aitken					
2014	VAFA	Division 2	1st				Ian Aitken		Andrew Brazzale			
2015	VAFA	Division 1	2nd				Ian Aitken					
2016	VAFA	Premier C	5th	7	11	0	Ian Aitken					
2017	VAFA	Premier C	10th	3	15	0	Peter Callinan					
2018	VAFA	Division 1	8th	6	12	0	Michael Shmerling					
2019	VAFA	Division 1	3rd	12	5	1	Ian Aitken		Jack Delbridge			
2020	VAFA	Division 1	(No season)				Ian Aitken		(No season)			
2021	VAFA	Division 1	3rd (Note: Although Kew finished third in 2021, no finals series was held as the season was curtailed due to the impact of the COVID-19 pandemic.)	9	2	0	Ian Aitken		Max Waters			
2022	VAFA	Division 1	2nd				Ian Aitken	Max Waters				
2023	VAFA	Division 1	7th	8	10	0	Ian Aitken	Max Waters	Max Waters	Lachlan James	21	
2024	VAFA	Division 1	6th	8	9	1	Jack Cole	Max Waters	Max Waters	Ned Waters	42	
