= 1883 VFA season =

7th season of the Victorian Football Association

Overview
- Date: 21 April – 29 September 1883
- Teams: 6
- Premiers: Geelong; 5th premiership

The 1883 VFA season was the seventh season of the Victorian Football Association (VFA), the highest-level senior Australian rules football competition in the colony of Victoria.

Geelong won the premiership for the fifth time, making it the club's fifth VFA premiership in just six seasons, and the second in a sequence of three consecutive premierships won from 1882 to 1884.

== Association membership ==
As the East Melbourne Football Club folded in August 1882, the senior metropolitan membership of the Association (including Geelong) was reduced from seven to six clubs in 1883: Carlton, Essendon, Geelong, Hotham, Melbourne and South Melbourne.

At this time, three other provincial senior clubs were full Association members represented on the Board of Management, for a total membership of nine: Ballarat, Albion Imperial and Horsham Unions. Due to distance, these clubs played too few matches against the rest of the VFA to be considered relevant in the premiership.

== Premiership season ==
The 1883 premiership was won by the Geelong Football Club, captained by Chas Brownlow of Brownlow Medal fame. Geelong won fifteen and drew three of its twenty-one matches for the season. It was named premiers ahead of runners-up South Melbourne, whose record of eighteen wins and three draws from twenty-five matches was almost equally meritorious. Carlton finished third.

=== Club records ===
The below table details the playing records of the six clubs in all matches during the 1883 season. Two sets of results are given:

- Senior results: based only upon games played against other VFA senior clubs
- Total results: including senior games, and games against intercolonial, up-country and junior clubs.

The clubs are listed in the order in which they were ranked in the Sportsman newspaper. The VFA had no formal process by which the clubs were ranked, so the below order should be considered indicative only, particularly since the fixturing of matches was not standardised; however, the top three placings were later acknowledged in publications including the Football Record and are considered official.

Pos	Team	Senior results						Total results					
Pos	Team	Pld	W	L	D	GF	GA	Pld	W	L	D	GF	GA
1	Geelong (P)	13	8	3	2	56	41	21	15	3	3	97	54
2	South Melbourne	15	8	4	3	46	34	25	18	4	3	58	22
3	Carlton	16	7	8	1	46	46	24	14	8	2	91	52
	Essendon	14	5	6	3	41	41	21	9	9	3	70	57
	Melbourne	17	7	9	1	39	48	24	12	10	2	67	59
	Hotham	15	2	7	6	31	49	21	6	7	8	53	50

(P) Premiers

== See also ==
- 1883 Victorian football season
