= 1888 Victorian football season =

19th senior season of Australian rules football in Victoria

- Date: 14 April – 29 September 1888

The 1888 Victorian football season was the 19th senior season of Australian rules football in the colony of Victoria.

== VFA ==
South Melbourne won the Victorian Football Association (VFA) premiership for the third time, after finishing the season with 15 wins from its 19 matches.

== VJFA ==
1888 VJFA season
- Premiers: North Park; 3rd premiership

The 1888 VJFA season was the sixth season of the Victorian Junior Football Association (VJFA). (Note: At the time, the term "junior" was used to describe open age football of a lower standard than senior football, rather than under age football.) North Park won the premiership for the third time, as part of a sequence of five premierships won by the club between 1886 and 1890.

The third-rate premiership was won by the Domain Football Club.

=== Ladder ===
Pos	Team	Pld	W	L	D	GF	GA	Pts
1	North Park (P)	15	13	1	1	59	9	54
2	Fitzroy Imperial	13	9	2	2	37	17	40
3	Britannia	14	8	2	4			40
4	South St Kilda	12	8	4	0			32
5	Union Jack	16	8	5	3			38
6	Clifton	18	8	8	2			36
7	Coburg	10	5	3	2			24
8	Brunswick	11	2	6	3			14

(P) Premiers

== Ballarat District ==
Ballarat and South Ballarat were the premier clubs in the Ballarat District competition.

=== Ladder ===
Pos	Team	Pts
1	Ballarat (P)	22
2	South Ballarat (P)	22
3	Ballarat Imperial	4

(P) Premiers

== Goulburn Valley ==
1888 GVFA season
- Premiers: Numurkah; 1st premiership

The 1888 GVFA season was the inaugural season of the Goulburn Valley Football Association (GVFA).

=== Ladder ===
Pos	Team	Pld	W	L	D	GF	GA
1	Numurkah (P)			1			
2	Muckatah						
	Narioka						
	Nathalia						
	Wunghnu						
	Yarroweyah						

(P) Premiers

== Sandhurst ==
1888 SFA season
- Premiers: Bendigo; 3rd premiership

The 1888 SFA season was the eighth season of the Sandhurst Football Association (SFA).

Bendigo won the premiership for the third time.

=== Ladder ===
Pos	Team
1	Bendigo (P)
	Eaglehawk
	North Bendigo
	Sandhurst

(P) Premiers
