= 1889 Victorian football season =

20th senior season of Australian rules football in Victoria

- Date: 4 May – 28 September 1889

The 1889 Victorian football season was the 20th senior season of Australian rules football in the colony of Victoria.

== VFA ==
South Melbourne won the Victorian Football Association (VFA) premiership for the fourth time and the second year in a row, after finishing the season with 14 wins from its 19 matches.

== VJFA ==
1889 VJFA season
- Premiers: North Park; 4th premiership

The 1889 VJFA season was the seventh season of the Victorian Junior Football Association (VJFA). (Note: At the time, the term "junior" was used to describe open age football of a lower standard than senior football, rather than under age football.) North Park won the premiership for the fourth time, as part of a sequence of five premierships won by the club between 1886 and 1890.

=== Ladder ===
Pos	Team	Pld	W	L	D	GF	GA	Pts	PPG
1	North Park (P)	20	15	1	4	74	25	68	3.400
2	East Richmond	20	16	4	0	75	28	64	3.200
3	Britannia	19	14	3	2	66	33	60	3.158
4	St Kilda Esplanade	19	11	2	6	51	28	56	2.947
5	Camberwell	21	13	4	4	71	37	60	2.857
6	Albion United	18	11	5	2	70	43	48	2.667
7	Union Jack	19	11	5	3	44	28	50	2.632
8	South St Kilda	20	10	5	5	69	41	50	2.500
9	Coburg	21	13	8	0	37	39	52	2.476
10	South Brunswick	20	11	7	2	50	38	48	2.400
11	Fitzroy Imperial	18	9	6	3	43	41	42	2.333
12	Brunswick	18	7	5	6	42	39	40	2.222
13	Brighton	19	7	7	5	54	55	38	2.000
14	Essendon District	19	7	8	4	32	43	36	1.895
15	Parkside	19	6	9	4	46	54	32	1.684
16	Fernside	19	6	9	4	36	60	32	1.684
17	Marylebone	22	7	11	4	37	43	36	1.636
18	Clifton	21	5	14	2	26	63	24	1.143
19	Moonee Ponds	21	4	13	4	26	67	24	1.143
20	Kew	19	2	11	6	30	53	20	1.053
21	North Carlton Imperial	19	3	14	2	31	33	16	0.842
22	Marlton	19	3	14	2	29	46	16	0.842
23	Star of Brunswick	18	3	12	3	20	41	18	1.000
24	South Park	12	7	5	0	21	33	28	2.333
25	Ascot Vale	15	3	12	0	23	54	12	0.800
26	Coast	10	1	8	1	12	41	6	0.600

(P) Premiers

== Goulburn Valley ==
1889 GVFA season
- Premiers: Numurkah; 2nd premiership
- Runners-up: Cobram; 1st runners-up result

The 1889 GVFA season was the second season of the Goulburn Valley Football Association (GVFA).

Numurkah won the premiership for the second time, after defeating Cobram in the grand final held on 10 August 1889.

=== Ladder ===
Pos	Team
1	Numurkah (P)
2	Cobram
	Nathalia
	Wunghnu
	Yarroweyah

(P) Premiers

=== Grand Final ===
1889 GVFA Grand Final
Saturday, 10 August	Cobram	def. by	Numurkah	Cobram
0.3	Q1; Q2; Q3; Final	4.8	Umpires: Kennedy
Goals	Drummond 2
Best	Drummond, Harford, Winchester, Vanthoff, O'Dwyer, McNamara, Cox

== Sandhurst ==
1889 SFA season
- Premiers: Sandhurst; 2nd premiership

The 1889 SFA season was the ninth season of the Sandhurst Football Association (SFA).

Sandhurst won the premiership for the second time after finishing the season undefeated.

=== Ladder ===
Pos	Team	Pld	W	L	D	GF	GA
1	Sandhurst (P)			0			
2	Bendigo						
	Eaglehawk						
	North Bendigo						

(P) Premiers
