= 1885 VFA season =

9th season of the Victorian Football Association

Overview
- Date: 2 May – 26 September 1885
- Teams: 10
- Premiers: South Melbourne; 2nd premiership

The 1885 VFA season was the ninth season of the Victorian Football Association (VFA), the highest-level senior Australian rules football competition in Victoria.

South Melbourne won the premiership for the second time, having finished the season with 22 wins from its 25 total matches.

== Association membership ==
The senior metropolitan membership of the Association (including Geelong) increased from eight to ten clubs in 1885.

The two new clubs were the newly formed Richmond, and University, who were playing senior football in its own right for the first time.

At this time, five other provincial senior clubs were full Association members represented on the Board of Management: Ballarat, Ballarat Imperial, South Ballarat, Horsham Trades and Horsham Unions. Due to distance, these clubs played too few matches against the rest of the VFA to be considered relevant in the premiership.

== Season ==
In one of the most dominant seasons seen in the VFA's history, South Melbourne finished the season undefeated from a total of 25 matches: 14–0–2 against the other VFA senior clubs, and 22–0–3 against all opponents – which included matches against all four South Australian senior clubs. South Melbourne scored almost four times as many goals as it conceded, and scored at least seven goals in half of its matches. Essendon, which lost only two of its 21 matches, finished as runner up, and the defending premiers Geelong finished third.

== Club records ==
The below table details the playing records of the ten clubs in all matches during the 1885 season. Two sets of results are given:

- Senior results: based only upon games played against other VFA senior clubs
- Total results: including senior games, and games against intercolonial, up-country and junior clubs.

The clubs are listed in the order in which they were ranked in the Sportsman newspaper. The VFA had no formal process by which the clubs were ranked, so the below order should be considered indicative only, particularly since the fixturing of matches was not standardised; however, the top three placings were later acknowledged in publications including the Football Record and are considered official.

Pos	Team	Senior results						Total results					
Pos	Team	Pld	W	L	D	GF	GA	Pld	W	L	D	GF	GA
1	South Melbourne (P)	16	14	0	2	101	24	25	22	0	3	158	39
2	Essendon	18	12	2	4	84	43	21	15	2	4	108	25
3	Geelong	17	8	4	5	61	51	21	12	4	5	81	60
–	Carlton	20	10	8	2	61	58	22	12	8	2	73	61
–	Fitzroy	19	8	8	3	51	51	23	10	9	4	59	58
–	Williamstown	15	6	7	2	35	45	18	9	7	2	45	49
–	Hotham	16	6	6	4	49	49	23	13	6	4	97	63
–	Melbourne	21	5	14	2	35	78	23	6	15	2	4	88
–	Richmond	17	4	11	2	30	64	17	4	11	2	30	64
–	University	17	1	14	2	24	68	18	2	14	2	28	69

(P) Premiers

== Notable events ==
=== Disputed match between South Melbourne and Essendon ===
The match between premiers South Melbourne and Essendon on 15 August at the South Melbourne Cricket Ground was initially drawn, South Melbourne 3.17 vs Essendon 3.10. Essendon protested the result, seeking an extra goal to be credited to its score from one of two opportunities in a wild period of play in the second half.

The first attempt related to a kick out of a scrimmage which was interfered with by a small boy who had crossed the fence and was standing near one of the goal posts. Goal umpire Handley had ruled that the ball had hit the goal post, then hit the boy, resulting in a behind; Essendon presented witnesses who stated that the ball never hit the post, or that it hit the boy before the post. Essendon also noted that its goalsneak Lang, who was behind the scrimmage and could have gathered the ball and ensured a goal was scored without interference, elected not to due to its trajectory towards goal. Each club produced a separate boy to give evidence, each claiming theirs was the one who interfered with play.

The second attempt, immediately afterwards, saw the ball kicked back into play, and gathered by Rout of Essendon, who kicked the ball high towards the goal and was awarded no score. There was conflicting evidence on three matters of this attempt: whether the ball had been legally kicked off by a South Melbourne player or illegally by a spectator; whether Rout's kick had been between the posts or not; and whether or not Essendon appealed for the goal.

The motion to award a fourth goal and the game to Essendon was carried at a special meeting on 28 August by a margin of 14–7, temporarily inflicting South Melbourne's first loss for the season. The opinion of the newspapers was overwhelmingly that Handley had erred; and, the new practice of goal umpires being appointed by the clubs rather than appointed and paid by the association was called into question – Handley was South Melbourne's appointed goal umpire in the match, and did not have a good reputation for his proficiency in the role.

However, there remained a view that the Association's actions were ultra vires, and South Melbourne then retained counsel to demonstrate this. The original decision was made based on Rules 1 and 8 of its constitution, which collectively stated that all disputes could be referred to a special meeting of the Association for resolution. However, the counsels' opinion was that later provisions in the Laws of the Game served to exclude umpiring decisions from the scope of such disputes: specifically, Rule 8, which stated "the goal umpire shall be sole judges of goals"; Rule 11, which supported the indisputability of an umpire's decision by penalising a player who disputes; and Rule 19, which created a specific provision for the Association to settle an umpiring dispute only if the umpire refused to make a decision. A separate special meeting was held on 25 September, and the committee voted to rescind the decision by an 11–6 margin, reinstating the drawn result and South Melbourne's unbeaten season.

== See also ==
- 1885 Victorian football season
