= 1882 Victorian football season =

13th senior season of Australian rules football in Victoria

- Date: 22 April – 30 September 1882

The 1882 Victorian football season was the 13th senior season of Australian rules football in the colony of Victoria.

== Clubs ==
=== Founded ===
Club	League	Ref
Ballarat North	Ballarat District	
Preston	Juniors	
Rushworth		

=== Mergers ===
Original clubs	New club	League	Founded	Ref
Ballarat City	Ballarat City Imperial	Ballarat District	30 May 1882	
Ballarat Imperial	Ballarat City Imperial	Ballarat District	30 May 1882	

=== Dissolved ===
Club	League	Ref
East Melbourne	VFA	

== VFA ==
Geelong won the Victorian Football Association (VFA) premiership for the fourth time, making it the club's fourth VFA premiership in just five seasons, and the first in a sequence of three consecutive premierships won from 1882 to 1884.

== Juniors ==
South Yarra was the premier club in the junior competition. (Note: At the time, the term "junior" was used to describe open age football of a lower standard than senior football, rather than under age football.) This was disputed, as South Yarra did not play other leading junior clubs – including Hotham United, Northcote, South Park and Star of Carlton – during the season.

Peter Pindar, a football writer at The Australasian, wrote that "it would be just as absurd to call a club the premier which had never met Geelong, Carlton, Essendon, and South Melbourne, as it would be to style one the premier junior which had not met Hotham United, Northcote, South Park, or the Star of Carlton". In a letter to The Herald, South Park secretary W.M. Roy said that he "fail[ed] to see that we are not entitled to claim the Junior Premiership of 1882".

=== Club records ===
Pos	Team	Pld	W	L	D	GF	GA
1	South Yarra (P)	20	9	4	7	40	30
2	South Park	12	7	1	4	34	8
3	Sandridge	15	9	2	4	27	11
4	Star of Carlton	18	13	2	3	40	14
	Powlett	18	9	7	2	36	40
	Williamstown	15	8	4	3	38	13
	Northcote	13	6	6	1	30	12
	Richmond	15	8	6	1	31	25
	Hawthorn	10	3	6	1	18	27
	Waverley	13	5	8	0	24	30
	Hotham United	14	2	9	3	13	27
	Royal Park	11	1	8	2	6	14
	Toorak	11	0	10	1	10	37
	Britannia	8	3	9	9	6	10

(P) Premiers

== Ballarat District ==
Albion Imperial was the premier club in the Ballarat District competition. During the season, Ballarat City merged with Ballarat Imperial to form the "Ballarat City Imperial Football Club", although it retained the colours of Ballarat Imperial and is considered a continuation of Ballarat Imperial. By this season, more than 100 clubs were based around the Ballarat region.

=== Club records ===
Pos	Team	Pld	W	L	D	GF	GA
1	Albion Imperial (P)	14	10	1	3	39	10
	Ballarat	21	14	4	3	57	29
	Ballarat City Imperial						

(P) Premiers

== Sandhurst ==
1882 SFA season
- Date: 3 May – 30 September 1882
- Premiers: Eaglehawk; 1st premiership

The 1882 SFA season was the second season of the Sandhurst Football Association (SFA). Eaglehawk was the premier club. Bendigo, Coachbuilders, Ironbark and Sandhurst also competed. The SFA also played a representative match against South Yarra on 24 May 1882 at the Upper Reserve.

=== Club records ===
Pos	Team	Pld	W	L	D	GF	GA
1	Eaglehawk (P)	23	11	8	4	35	20
	Sandhurst	13	6	3	4	20	
	Bendigo						
	Coachbuilders						
	Ironbark						

(P) Premiers
