= 1881 Victorian football season =

12th senior season of Australian rules football in Victoria

- Date: 30 April – 1 October 1881

The 1881 Victorian football season was the twelfth senior season of Australian rules football in the colony of Victoria. The season saw the formation of the Sandhurst Football Association in the Bendigo region, which followed the formation of the Victorian Football Association five years earlier in 1877.

== Clubs ==
=== New clubs ===
Club	League	Ref
Canterbury	Juniors	

== VFA ==
South Melbourne won the Victorian Football Association (VFA) premiership for the first time, after finishing the season with seven wins from its eleven senior matches.

== Juniors ==
South Park was the premier club in the junior competition. (Note: At the time, the term "junior" was used to describe open age football of a lower standard than senior football, rather than under age football.) Battery United, Britannia, Brunswick, Hawthorn, Hotham United, Northcote, Powlett, Royal Park, Sandridge, South Carlton, South Yarra, Southern, Waverley and Williamstown were also mentioned as being among the top teams.

=== Club records ===
Pos	Team	Pld	W	L	D	GF	GA
1	South Park (P)	18	13	1	4	61	7
2	South Yarra	18	10	5	3	49	27
3	Hotham United	17	8	7	2	30	15
4	Hawthorn	14	7	6	1	31	29
5	Star of Carlton	19	8	3	8	30	16
6	Waverley	14	7	3	4	20	15
	Powlett	18	9	4	5	37	27
	Stanley	19	15	2	2	48	13
	Royal Park	15	4	4	7	16	19
	Battery United	16	11	1	4	36	6
	Sandridge	11	4	5	2	11	18
	Britannia	16		2		29	9
	Williamstown	13	6	3	4	22	13
	Northcote	14	4	8	2	23	35
	Southern	6	0	6	0	2	21
	Brunswick						
	South Carlton						

(P) Premiers

== Ballarat District ==
Ballarat Imperial was the premier club in the Ballarat District competition, winning nine of its twelve matches.

=== Club records ===
Pos	Team	Pld	W	L	D	GF	GA
1	Ballarat Imperial (P)	12	9	2	1	34	10
2	Ballarat City	15	10	4	1	37	9
3	Albion Imperial	10	8	0	2	21	6
4	Victoria Imperial	13	5	1	7	13	9
5	Ballarat	19	0	15	4	11	47
6	Creswick	10	5	4	1	16	12

(P) Premiers

== Geelong District ==
Geelong West was the premier club in the Geelong District competition, winning seven of its 17 matches. A representative Geelong District team played a match against South Australia at Corio Cricket Ground on 27 August, with Geelong District winning eight goals to zero.

=== Club records ===
Pos	Team	Pld	W	L	D	GF	GA
1	Geelong West (P)	17	7	7	3	37	20
	Chilwell						
	East Geelong						
	North Geelong						

(P) Premiers

== Sandhurst ==
1881 SFA season
- Teams: 7
- Premiers: Sandhurst; 1st premiership

The 1881 SFA season was the inaugural season of the Sandhurst Football Association (SFA), which was formed at a meeting on 10 June 1881. Sandhurst was the premier club, winning 11 of its 19 matches.

=== Club records ===
Pos	Team	Pld	W	L	D	GF	GA
1	Sandhurst (P)	19	11	1	7	39	13
	Bendigo	16	9	4	3	30	15
	Civil Service	6	2	2	2	7	5
	Ironbark	12	3	3	6	13	14
	Coachbuilders	8	1	3	4	7	11
	Epsom	4	0	3	1	1	9
	Eaglehawk						
−	Sandhurst (2nd 20)	6	2	4	0	6	11
−	Bendigo (2nd 20)	8	6	1	1	12	3

(P) Premiers
