= 1884 Victorian football season =

15th senior season of Australian rules football in Victoria

- Date: 3 May – 27 September 1884

The 1884 Victorian football season was the 15th senior season of Australian rules football in the colony of Victoria.

== Clubs ==
=== Founded ===
Club	League	Ref
Queenscliff	Geelong District	

== VFA ==
Geelong won the Victorian Football Association (VFA) premiership for the fifth time, making it the club's sixth VFA premiership in just seven seasons, and the third in a sequence of three consecutive premierships won from 1882 to 1884.

== VJFA ==
1884 VJFA season
- Date: 3 May – 27 September 1884
- Premiers: Star of Carlton; 1st premiership

The 1884 VJFA season was the second season of the Victorian Junior Football Association (VJFA). (Note: At the time, the term "junior" was used to describe open age football of a lower standard than senior football, rather than under age football.) Star of Carlton was the premier club for the first time. Sandridge changed its name to Port Melbourne during the season, in line with the renaming of the municipality.

=== Club records ===
Pos	Team	Pld	W	L	D	GF	GA
1	Star of Carlton (P)	20	14	1	5	51	11
2	Port Melbourne	19	13	2	4	46	10
3	Williamstown Juniors	17	14	2	1	34	19
	Britannia	16	10	1	5		
	Brunswick	16	9	2	5	29	13
	South Yarra	16	9	4	3	40	22
	North Park	17	10	5	2	17	14
	South Melbourne Juniors	18	9	6	3	24	30
	St Kilda Royal	17	10	4	3	41	29
	Avenue	16	9	5	2	31	18
	Evansdale	17	5	8	4	29	52

(P) Premiers

== Ballarat District ==
Ballarat Imperial was the premier club in the Ballarat District competition. This was disputed by South Ballarat (which had renamed itself from Albion Imperial at the start of the season).

=== Club records ===
Pos	Team	Pld	W	L	D	GF	GA
1	Ballarat Imperial (P)	8	6	2	0	27	15
2	South Ballarat	13	8	5	0	43	33
	Ballarat	14	0	13	1	9	59

(P) Premiers
