= Chas Brownlow =

Australian rules footballer (1861–1924)

- Born: Charles Brownlow; 25 July 1861; Geelong, Victoria
- Died: 23 January 1924 (aged 62); Geelong, Victoria
- Occupation: VFL administrator/football player/VFL club captain
- Known for: Brownlow Medal

Charles "Chas" Brownlow (25 July 1861 – 23 January 1924) was an Australian rules football player and administrator. He is the namesake of the Brownlow Medal, which is awarded to the fairest and best player in the Australian Football League.

Brownlow was born in Geelong, Victoria. After briefly playing for North Geelong, he joined the Geelong Football Club in 1881 and captained the club in the Victorian Football Association (VFA) from 1883 to 1884. He retired to focus on his business as a jeweller, watchmaker and silversmith, although he made occasional appearances until 1890. Brownlow served as Geelong's secretary from 1888 to 1924, including its move to the new Victorian Football League (VFL) in 1897. He became a vice-president of the VFL and later served as president of the Australasian Football Council from 1919 to 1924. The Brownlow Medal was created by the VFL after his death in recognition of his administrative service.

== Early life ==
Brownlow was born on 25 July 1861 in Geelong, Victoria. He was the second of six children born to Eliza (née Whitaker) and Charles Brownlow. His parents had immigrated to Australia from England in 1858.

Brownlow was raised in Geelong. His father ran a china importing firm and warehouse and his parents were prominent in the local Methodist community. Brownlow is likely to have attended a local state school; there are no records that he attended Geelong College. After leaving school he was apprenticed to Edward Fischer, a local silversmith, watchmaker and jeweller, who created the trophies for the Melbourne Cup and Geelong Cup.

== Business career ==
In 1880, Brownlow established his own jewellery and watchmaking shop on Malop Street, Geelong. He produced trophies and medals for various local organisations and sporting clubs, often donating prizes in his name as a way of promoting his business. In 1893, Brownlow went into partnership with William Caldwell, a former Geelong Football Club secretary, to open a sporting goods store on Malop Street, which they termed a "sports depot". They acted as agents for the club's excursion trains for "away" fixtures in Melbourne, drawing a significant amount of business to the store.

Brownlow and his wife also had other business ventures including a tobacconist shop and hairdressing salon.

== Playing career ==
Brownlow c. 1881

Brownlow began playing for the North Geelong Football Club in the late 1870s. In 1881 he joined the Geelong Football Club, which was classed as one of the "senior" (highest-ranking) clubs in the Victorian Football Association (VFA). He made his debut for Geelong against Hotham in May 1881 at the East Melbourne Cricket Ground and played 18 games during the 1881 VFA season, as well as an intercolonial game between Geelong and South Australia in August 1881.

Brownlow played in Geelong's premiership-winning 1882 season and participated in the team's tour of New South Wales. He was elected club captain prior to the 1883 season, aged 21, and captained Geelong to a second consecutive premiership. He was named best on ground in an exhibition game against touring South Australian club Port Adelaide and football writers in The Leader named him among Geelong's best players for the season.

In July 1884, midway through the 1884 season, Brownlow resigned as Geelong captain and announced his immediate retirement from playing, citing conflicting business interests that made him unable to attend practice. He made no senior appearances in 1885, but between 1886 and 1890 played another 13 games for Geelong. On several occasions he made up the numbers when Geelong was unable to field a full team for games in Melbourne, although he was still cited amongst the team's best players in newspaper reporting. During the 1890 season, Brownlow kicked three goals, including the match-winner, in a game against Melbourne at Corio Oval. He made his final VFA appearance for Geelong against Footscray in September 1890. While early match records are incomplete, it has been estimated he played at least 70 games for Geelong against "senior" VFA clubs and kicked at least 15 goals.

== Administrative career ==
=== Football ===
Brownlow was elected to the Geelong Football Club's general committee in 1884 and later that year served on the committee overseeing the amalgamation of the Geelong Football Club and the Corio Cricket Club, with the merged entity known as the Geelong Cricket and Football Club. He was appointed to the salaried position of club secretary in August 1888, a position he would hold for over 35 years.

Brownlow served as Geelong's delegate on the Victorian Football League board from 1902 until 1922, and in that capacity as the VFL's vice-president and delegate to the Australasian Football Council from 1911 until 1916, and as chairman of the permit and umpires committee from 1911 until 1922. In addition to this, he was caretaker president of the VFL in 1918 and 1919. He became president of the Australasian Football Council in 1919, and served in that position until his death.

Brownlow was a major supporter and promoter of the "universal football" concept proposed by AFC secretary Con Hickey, which sought to unite Australian football and rugby league under a single set of rules. While attending the 1914 Sydney Carnival, he and Hickey invited a delegation from the New South Wales Rugby League (NSWRL) to attend a unity conference in Melbourne. Brownlow chaired the conference in November 1914, which developed a set of hybrid rules including the use of a rectangular field, the addition of a crossbar and other changes to scoring. Despite an initial positive reception for the concept, the Victorian delegates failed to win support for the rule changes and were regarded by some football writers, including Jack Worrall, as having sold out the game. With all sporting activities affected by the war, the AFC postponed consideration of the merger until December 1919, when under Brownlow's chairmanship the council unanimously resolved to reject universal football.

=== Other sports ===
In addition to football, Brownlow held administrative roles in athletics, baseball, cricket and rowing. He was elected captain of the Corio Bay Rowing Club in 1884 and became the club's coach in 1887. He served on the committee organising the Barwon Regatta for 20 over years and was elected permanent chairman in 1911. Brownlow was a co-founder of the Geelong Baseball Club in 1889 and served as its inaugural honorary secretary and treasurer, as well as playing for the club. He was also acting secretary of the Geelong Athletic Club in 1890.

In 1896, Brownlow helped establish the Geelong Cricket Association (GCA) and became its inaugural honorary secretary. He organised for the England cricket team to play a match in Geelong during its 1911–12 tour of Australia. When the GCA folded a few seasons later, he helped facilitate the admission of a Geelong team into the Melbourne-based Victorian Sub-District Cricket Association.

== Personal life ==
In 1886, Brownlow married Matilda Barber, with whom he had five children. Their first child died in infancy. His wife frequently accompanied him on football trips and in 1903 was presented with a diamond bracelet by Geelong players for her efforts on the club's visit to Sydney.

In 1923, it was reported that Brownlow was suffering from chronic kidney disease. He died at his home in Geelong on 23 January 1924, aged 62. His funeral was reportedly "one of the largest funerals the town had ever seen".

== Honours ==
Brownlow was elected as a honorary life member of the VFL in March 1921. VFL secretary Edwin Lionel Wilson wrote to Brownlow stating that the committee "considered that no one at any time has been more worthy of the highest distinction that it is in the power of the League to confer".

Brownlow is primarily known as the namesake of the Brownlow Medal, which is awarded to the fairest and best player in the Australian Football League (the successor to the VFL) and is regarded as the league's most prestigious honour. The creation of the medal was resolved at a VFL committee meeting in February 1924, a month after his death, with the motion moved by Collingwood Football Club secretary Ern Copeland and carried unanimously by the other delegates. The medal is formally known as the "Chas. Brownlow Trophy", according to its inscription, although Copeland's motion used the name "Brownlow Medal".

Brownlow was inducted to the Australian Football Hall of Fame in 1997 within the category of administrators. He was named as a "legend" of the Geelong Football Club in 2017, "the highest honour that the Club can bestow on any person".
