= 1912 VJFA Grand Final =

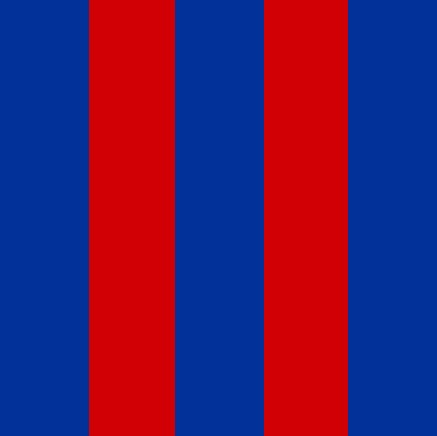

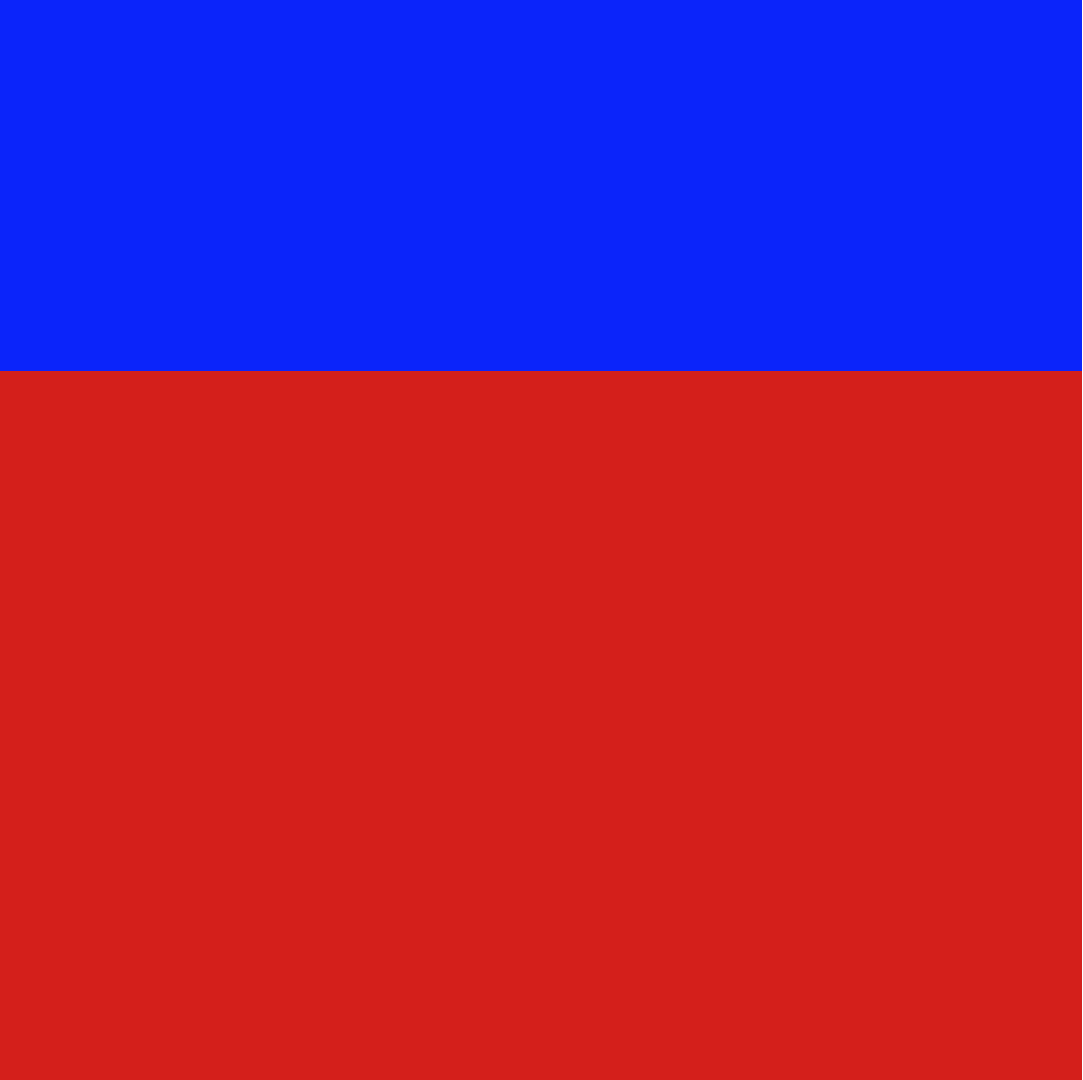
Railway United	Yarraville
3.9 (27)	4.6 (30)
	1	2	3	4
RU	1.1 (7)	2.4 (16)	3.5 (23)	4.9 (33)
YAR	3.2 (20)	4.3 (27)	4.4 (28)	4.6 (30)
- Date: 21 September 1912
- Stadium: Croxton Park
- Attendance: "Fairly good"
- Umpires: James McMurray

The 1912 VJFA Grand Final was an Australian rules football match contested between Port Melbourne Railway United and Yarraville at Croxton Park on 21 September 1912. It was the 10th grand final of the Victorian Junior Football Association (VJFA), held to determine the premiers of the 1912 VJFA season.

Railway United originally won the match by three points, but Yarraville successfully protested one of Port Melbourne's second quarter goals on the grounds of a goal umpire's error, and the result was reversed to a three-point Yarraville victory.

Although they had the right to challenge, Railway United objected to the decision and refused to play in protest, meaning that the grand final was scratched and Yarraville were awarded the premiership. Railway United was almost expelled from the VJFA as a result.

== Background ==
=== Argus finals system ===
At the time, the VJFA (like the Victorian Football League and Victorian Football Association) used the Argus finals system. This gave the club that finished first on the ladder at the end of the home-and-away season (the minor premiers) the right to challenge the winner of the finals series for the premiership. This meant grand finals in this era were a mixture of challenge matches and non-challenge matches, which would have been followed by challenge matches had the minor premier been defeated.

=== 1910 grand final ===
The rivalry between Port Melbourne Railway United and Yarraville was already strong in the VJFA prior to 1912.

In the 1910 grand final, with Railway United leading by ten points in the final quarter, the primary ball (provided by Yarraville) burst, and was found to have been stabbed with a pen-knife by a spectator. The back-up ball (provided by Port Melbourne) could not be inflated because the pump could not be found – and Yarraville lodged a protest, which was quickly dismissed, arguing that it should be awarded the game by virtue of Port Melbourne not having provided a ready-to-use ball.

Yarraville won the replay, but Railway United won a challenge final (and thus the 1910 premiership) in a game that was condemned for its violence.

=== 1912 season and finals series ===
Railway United and Yarraville played each other twice in the 1912 home-and-away season. Yarraville won the first game 6.11 (47) to 4.6 (30), and Railway United won the second game 5.6 (36) to 2.1 (13).

Railway United secured the 1912 minor premiership with a win over Brighton Juniors in the final home-and-away round on 24 August. They defeated Brighton again in the second semi-final 5.11 (41) to 3.5 (23) on 14 September at Croxton Park. This was Port Melbourne's 14th victory over Brighton since they entered the VJFA.

Yarraville defeated Footscray Juniors in the first semi-final. Footscray won 10 of their 17 games in the 1912 season.

On the day of the grand final, The Standard reported Railway United was "very confident" of winning the premiership.

== Match summary ==
During a "strenuous" first quarter, Railway United captain Kennedy dislocated a wrist, although he was able to resume playing after splints were applied. Yarraville kicked three goals to Port Melbourne's one, and led by 13 points at quarter time. The second quarter was more evenly matched with both sides kicking one goal each, although Yarraville retained the lead by 11 points.

In the third quarter, Railway United had "better reward" for their effort, cutting the margin down to five points. The Age wrote that Yarraville "seemed to pay more attention to then men than the ball", with Port Melbourne kicking and marking well.

Railway United was the stronger side in the final quarter, keeping Yarraville goalless and running out three-point winners.

=== Scoreboard ===
1912 VJFA Grand Final
Saturday, 21 September	Port Melbourne Railway United	def. by	Yarraville	(crowd: "Fairly good")
1.1 (7); 2.4 (16); 3.5 (23); 4.9 (33); 3.9 (27)	Q1; Q2; Q3; Q4; Final	3.2 (20); 4.3 (27); 4.4 (28); 4.6 (30); 4.6 (30)	Umpires: James McMurray
Goals	Mitchell 2
Birch, Wheeler, McCarthy, Critch, Collins, O'Brien, Mackay, Cleland, Jackson	Best	Mitchell, Walker, Fletcher, O'Brien, Lawson, O'Shen, Ludwick, Nichols, McNeilage
Quarter-by-quarter scores reflect the scores before the VJFA disallowed Port Melbourne's second-quarter goal.

=== Umpires ===
Position		
Field:	James McMurray	
Boundary:	A. Porieous	A. Patterson
Goal:	F. Scott	K. Le Brun

== Aftermath ==
=== Yarraville protest ===
Yarraville lodged a protest following the end of the match, saying in the second quarter, goal umpire K. Le Brun mistakenly awarded Port Melbourne a goal when only a behind was scored. Le Brun said the ball was touched "three or four inches behind the posts", which would make it a goal, while field umpire James McMurray said he was in doubt over whether the ball was marked in front or behind of the goal line and did not give "all clear".

At the VJFA's meeting on Wednesday, 25 September, the goal was deemed to have been a behind and was disallowed (with no score recorded entirely), giving Yarraville a three-point victory.

=== Railway United forfeit ===
As minor premiers, Railway United had the right to challenge Yarraville in a grand final, which was scheduled for 5 October at Croxton Park.

However, Railway United captain Kennedy protested "rather forcibly" against the decision, and the club ultimately refused to exercise the right of challenge. Despite objections, Railway United representative H. Reid told the VJFA that there was "no hope" of his club reconsidering the decision.

On 3 October, a special meeting of the VJFA was held to further consider Railway United's refusal: when the club did not change its position by 10pm, it was formally proposed that "the club, office bearers and registered players for 1912 be disqualified for life".

Despite Yarraville having offered to play a substitute team, the grand final was scratched, and Yarraville were awarded the 1912 premiership.

Ultimately, Railway United was not expelled from the VJFA, and they went on to win the VJFA premiership the following season, defeating Yarraville in the 1913 grand final.
