= 1883 Victorian football season =

14th senior season of Australian rules football in Victoria

- Date: 21 April – 29 September 1883

The 1883 Victorian football season was the 14th senior season of Australian rules football in the colony of Victoria.

== Clubs ==
=== Founded ===
Two future Australian Football League (AFL) clubs − Fitzroy and Footscray − were founded in 1883.

Club	League	Ref
Fitzroy	VJFA	
Footscray	VJFA	

== VFA ==
Geelong won the Victorian Football Association (VFA) premiership for the fifth time, making it the club's fifth VFA premiership in just six seasons, and the second in a sequence of three consecutive premierships won from 1882 to 1884.

== VJFA ==
1883 VJFA season
- Date: 21 April – 29 September 1883
- Premiers: Waverley; 1st premiership

The 1883 VJFA season was the inaugural season of the Victorian Junior Football Association (VJFA). (Note: At the time, the term "junior" was used to describe open age football of a lower standard than senior football, rather than under age football.) The competition was officially established on 26 April 1883, with eleven clubs − Albion, Brunswick, Emerald Hill, Footscray, Fortrose, North Park, Richmond, South Park, South Yarra, Star of Carlton and Waverley − represented at the inaugural meeting.

Waverley were the premiers, only losing two of its 20 matches for the season. South Park secretary McKinery disputed this, saying his club was the only one entitled to the premiership. Britannia, Brunswick, Clifton, Fortrose, Normanby, Northcote, North Park, Powlett, Royal Park, Sandridge, Star of Carlton, Toorak and Williamstown were also named as the season's top clubs.

=== Club records ===
Pos	Team	Pld	W	L	D
1	Waverley (P)	20	9	2	8
2	South Park	18	12	2	4
3	Star of Carlton	16	9	2	5
	Northcote	19	13	5	1
	Sandridge	17	11	5	1
	Brunswick	20	7	7	5
	Britannia				
	Clifton				
	Fortrose				
	Normanby				
	North Park				
	Powlett				
	Royal Park				
	Toorak				
	Williamstown				

(P) Premiers

== Ballarat District ==
Albion Imperial was the premier club in the Ballarat District competition for the second consecutive season. Victoria Imperial was the premier junior club.

During a match on 15 September 1883, Ballarat Imperial captain John Williams Mills was struck in the abdomen, but played out the remainder of the match against Albion Imperial. However, he died the following morning.

=== Club records ===
Pos	Team	Pld	W	L	D	GF	GA
1	Albion Imperial (P)	8	4	4	0	24	23
2	Ballarat	9	1	6	2	16	24
	Ballarat Imperial	6	2	3	1	12	22

(P) Premiers
