= 1891 Victorian football season =

22nd senior season of Australian rules football in Victoria

1892 Victorian football season
- Date: 2 May – 26 September 1891

The 1891 Victorian football season was the 22nd senior season of Australian rules football in the colony of Victoria.

== VFA ==
Essendon won the Victorian Football Association (VFA) premiership for the first time, beginning a sequence of four consecutive premierships won from 1891 to 1894.

== VJFA ==
1891 VJFA season
- Premiers: Marylebone; 1st premiership

The 1891 VJFA season was the ninth season of the Victorian Junior Football Association (VJFA). (Note: At the time, the term "junior" was used to describe open age football of a lower standard than senior football, rather than under age football.) Marylebone won the premiership for the first and only time.

Beginning this year, VJFA clubs were divided into three divisions (known as Section A, Section B and Section C), each consisting of eight teams. After the end of the home-and-away season, the two highest-ranking teams from each division played in a finals series to determine the premiers.

Carlton Juniors won the second-rate premiership, which was contested by at least 24 clubs also competed in the VJFA's second-rate competition in 1891. Port Melbourne Imperial won the third-rate premiership.

During the season, Northcote player William Wiecraft was banned from the VJFA for life for "brutal play".

=== Ladder ===
Although the VJFA was split into three divisions, newspapers published a ladder with all clubs after the finals series.

Pos	Team	Pld	W	L	D	GF	GA	Pts
1	Marylebone (P)	19	13	2	4	109	34	60
2	Britannia	19	12	2	5	63	42	58
3	North Park	19	12	3	4	60	30	56
4	Napier Imperial	19	14	2	3	76	43	62
5	Essendon District	18	11	6	1	62	46	46
6	Brunswick	19	12	6	1	80	61	50
7	North Williamstown	14	8	1	5	30	19	42
8	Camberwell	14	9	3	2	39	27	40
9	Austral	14	9	3	2	52	28	40
10	South Melbourne Juniors	14	7	4	3	27	22	34
11	Albion United	14	6	4	4	47	46	32
12	Star of Brunswick	14	6	7	1	23	35	26
13	South St Kilda	14	5	6	3	42	46	26
14	Preston	14	6	7	1	23	47	26
15	Union Jack	14	5	7	2	35	34	24
16	Clifton	14	5	7	2	43	48	24
17	Northcote	14	4	9	1	21	43	18
18	Parkside	14	4	9	1	29	58	18
19	Coburg	14	3	8	3	29	50	18
20	Prahran	14	2	11	1	24	75	10
21	Brighton	14	2	11	1	24	53	10
–	East Richmond (W)	14	2	10	2	–	–	12
–	Electric Telegraph (W)	14	1	13	0	–	–	4
–	Kew (W)	14	–	–	–	–	–	0

(P) Premiers; (W) Withdrew mid-season

==== Section A ====
Pos	Team	Pld	W	L	D	GF	GA	Pts	Qualification
1	Napier Imperial	14	12	0	2	62	28	52	Finals series
2	North Park	14	9	1	4	50	11	44	Finals series
3	North Williamstown	14	8	1	5	30	19	42	
4	South St Kilda	14	5	6	3	42	46	26	
5	Preston	14	6	7	1	23	47	26	
6	Union Jack	14	5	7	2	35	34	24	
7	Brighton	14	2	11	1	24	75	10	
–	Electric Telegraph	14	1	13	0	–	–	4	Withdrew mid-season

==== Section B ====
Pos	Team	Pld	W	L	D	GF	GA	Pts	Qualification
1	Marylebone	14	10	2	2	79	21	44	Finals series
2	Britannia	14	9	1	4	35	19	44	Finals series
3	Camberwell	14	9	3	2	39	27	40	
4	South Melbourne Juniors	14	7	4	3	27	22	34	
5	Star of Brunswick	14	6	7	1	23	35	26	
6	Northcote	14	4	9	1	21	43	18	
7	Parkside	14	4	9	1	29	58	18	
–	Kew	14	–	–	–	–		0	Withdrew mid-season

==== Section C ====
Pos	Team	Pld	W	L	D	GF	GA	Pts	Qualification
1	Brunswick	14	11	2	1	64	33	46	Finals series
2	Essendon District	13	10	2	1	52	28	42	Finals series
3	Austral	14	9	3	2	52	28	40	
4	Albion United	14	6	4	4	47	46	32	
5	Clifton	14	5	7	2	43	48	24	
6	Coburg	14	3	8	3	29	50	18	
7	Prahran	14	2	11	1	24	75	10	
–	East Richmond	14	2	10	2	–	–	12	Withdrew mid-season

=== Finals ===
==== Round 1 ====
	Round 1
Saturday, 15 August	Britannia 7	def.	Napier Imperial 4	Richmond Cricket Ground
Saturday, 15 August	Marylebone 8	def.	Brunswick 3	Royal Park
Saturday, 15 August	North Park 3	def.	Essendon District 1	Brunswick Cricket Ground

==== Round 2 ====
	Round 2
Saturday, 22 August	Marylebone	v	Napier Imperial	St Kilda Cricket Ground
Saturday, 22 August	Britannia	v	Essendon District	South Melbourne Cricket Ground
Saturday, 22 August	North Park 8.8 (8)	def.	Brunswick 4.7 (4)	Richmond Cricket Ground

==== Round 5 ====
	Round 5
Saturday, 12 September	Britannia 5.7 (5)	drew with	Marylebone 5.9 (5)	North Melbourne Recreation Reserve

==== Ladder ====
Pos	Team	Pld	W	L	D	GF	GA	Pts
1	Marylebone (P)	5	3	0	2	30	14	16
2	Britannia	5	3	1	1	24	20	14
3	North Park	5	3	2	0	19	18	12
4	Napier Imperial	5	2	1	2	14	15	12
5	Essendon District	5	1	4	0	10	18	4
6	Brunswick	5	1	4	0	16	28	4

(P) Premiers

== Goulburn Valley ==
1891 GVFA season
- Premiers: Yarroweyah; 1st premiership
- Runners-up: Congupna; 1st runners-up result

The 1891 GVFA season was the fourth season of the Goulburn Valley Football Association (GVFA).

Yarroweyah won the premiership for the first time, defeating Congupna in the grand final.

=== Grand Final ===
1891 GVFA Grand Final
Saturday, 22 August	Congupna	def. by	Numurkah	Congupna Recreation Reserve
1.1 (1)	Q1; Q2; Q3; Final	3.12 (3)
