= 1890 Victorian football season =

21st senior season of Australian rules football in Victoria

- Date: 3 May – 27 September 1890

The 1890 Victorian football season was the 21st senior season of Australian rules football in the colony of Victoria.

== Clubs ==
=== Dissolved ===
Club	League	Dissolved	Ref
Hawthorn	VJFA	28 March 1890	

== VFA ==
South Melbourne won the Victorian Football Association (VFA) premiership for the fifth time and the third year in a row, after finishing the season with 16 wins from its 19 matches.

== VJFA ==
1890 VJFA season
- Premiers: North Park; 5th premiership
- Leading goalkicker: A. Butler (North Park – 31 goals)

The 1890 VJFA season was the eighth season of the Victorian Junior Football Association (VJFA). (Note: At the time, the term "junior" was used to describe open age football of a lower standard than senior football, rather than under age football.) North Park won the premiership for the fifth time, as part of a sequence of five premierships won by the club between 1886 and 1890.

=== Ladder ===
Pos	Team	Pld	W	L	D	GF	GA	Pts	PPG
1	North Park (P)	21	20	1	0	92	59	80	3.810
2	Marylebone	19	17	1	1	82	21	70	3.684
3	Albion United	19	17	2	0	87	46	68	3.579
4	Napier Imperial	21	18	2	1	108	35	74	3.524
5	Britannia	20	14	2	4	53	24	64	3.200
6	East Richmond	19	13	5	1	67	34	54	2.842
7	Preston	18	11	4	3	41	37	50	2.778
8	Camberwell	21	14	6	1	74	49	58	2.762
9	Essendon District	19	11	4	4	46	39	52	2.737
10	South St Kilda	19	12	6	1	64	40	50	2.632
11	Parkside	20	10	9	1	61	49	42	2.100
12	South Brunswick	19	8	8	3	34	41	38	2.000
13	Union Jack	21	9	9	3	51	60	42	2.000
14	St Kilda Esplanade	19	8	9	2	31	34	36	1.895
15	Star of Brunswick	18	7	8	3	31	54	34	1.889
16	Clifton	19	6	8	5	41	50	34	1.789
17	Brighton	19	6	10	3	32	74	30	1.579
18	South Melbourne Juniors	15	5	9	1	28	39	22	1.467
19	Marlton	20	7	12	1	50	64	30	1.500
20	North Fitzroy	19	6	12	1	31	40	26	1.368
21	Brunswick	21	8	10	3	53	53	38	1.810
22	Fernside	19	4	13	2	23	46	20	1.053
23	Kew	19	3	12	4	28	74	20	1.053
24	Moonee Ponds	20	5	15	0	22	84	20	1.000
25	St Kilda Grosvenor	21	1	18	2	26	59	8	0.381
26	Coburg	21	1	18	2	26	66	8	0.381
27	Ascot Vale	20	0	19	1	12	55	2	0.100
28	South Park	16	6	8	2	34	38	28	1.750

(P) Premiers

== Goulburn Valley ==
1890 GVFA season
- Premiers: Numurkah; 3rd premiership
- Runners-up: Yarroweyah; 1st runners-up result

The 1890 GVFA season was the third season of the Goulburn Valley Football Association (GVFA).

Numurkah won the premiership for the third time, defeating Yarroweyah in the grand final.

=== Ladder ===
Pos	Team
1	Numurkah (P)
2	Yarroweyah
	Cobram
	Nathalia
	Wunghnu

(P) Premiers

=== Grand Final ===
1890 GVFA Grand Final
Saturday, 17 August	Yarroweyah	def. by	Numurkah	Numurkah
1.13 (1)	Q1; Q2; Q3; Final	4.10 (4)	Umpires: T. Mason

== Sandhurst ==
1890 SFA season
- Premiers: Sandhurst; 3rd premiership

The 1890 SFA season was the tenth season of the Sandhurst Football Association (SFA).

Sandhurst won the premiership for the third time.

=== Ladder ===
Pos	Team
1	Sandhurst (P)
2	Bendigo
	Eaglehawk
	North Bendigo

(P) Premiers
