= Preston City Oval =

Australian rules football and cricket venue in Preston, Victoria

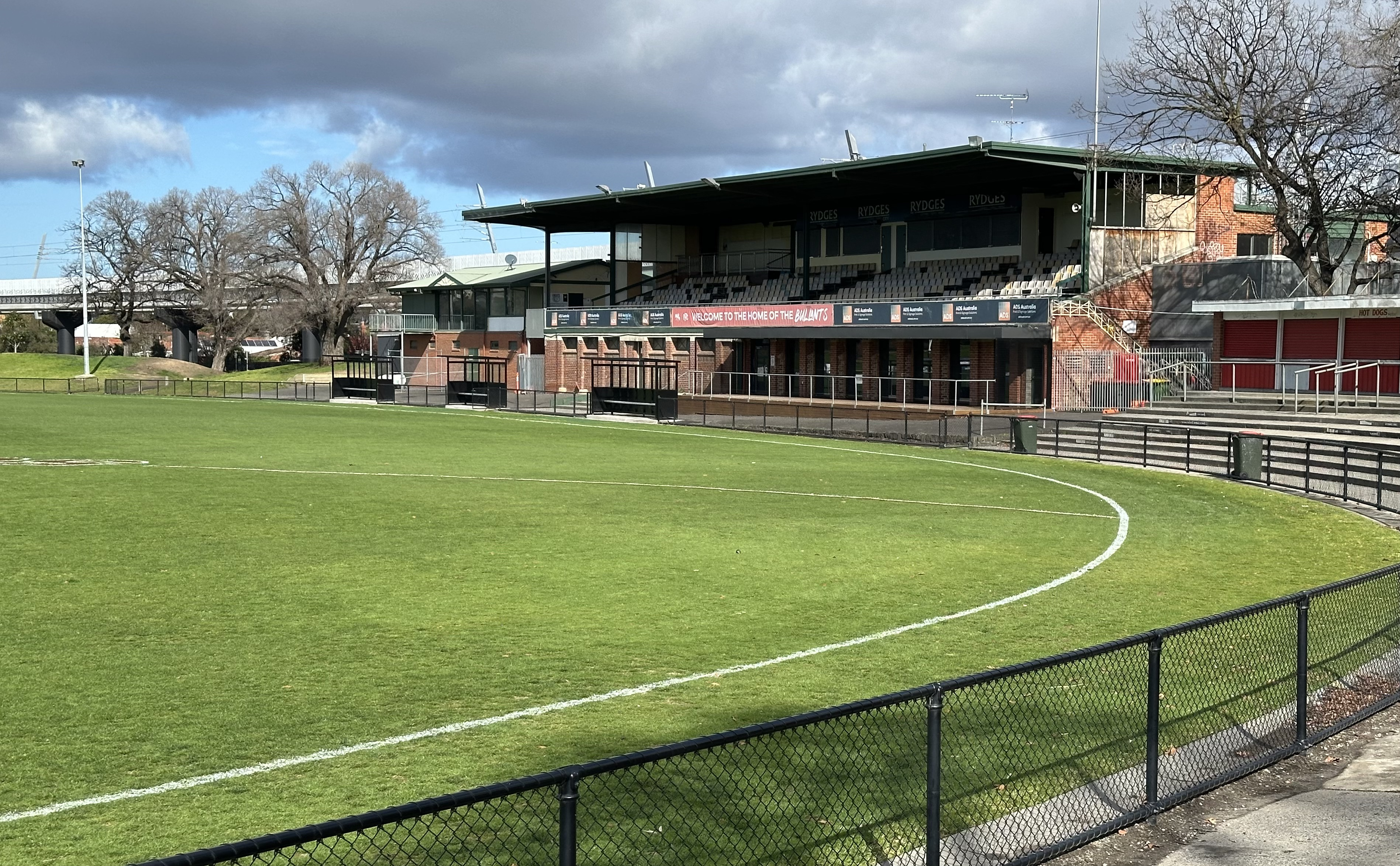
- Preston City Oval in August 2025
- Interactive map of Preston City Oval
- Former names: Preston Park (1876–1942); AMF Oval (2006); NAB Oval (2007–2011); Genis Steel Oval (2022–2025)
- Address: 11 Cramer St; Preston, Victoria
- Coordinates: 37.741°S 145.001°E
- Owner: City of Darebin
- Capacity: 5,000 (500 seated)
- Record attendance: 15,000 (three occasions)
- Field size: 161 metres × 115 metres
- Public transit: ● Preston

Construction
- Opened: 1876; 150 years ago
- Cost: A$2 million (2010–12 redevelopment)

Tenants
- Darebin Falcons (2017–); Northern Knights (1992–); Preston Cricket Club (1876–); Preston Football Club (1887–2025)

Preston City Oval (sometimes known informally as Cramer Street Oval) is an Australian rules football and cricket venue located in the Melbourne suburb of Preston. It was the earliest recreational space in the City of Darebin and has been continuously used for sporting activities since 1876.

The ground has hosted grand finals in the Northern Football Netball League (NFNL), the Victorian Amateur Football Association (VAFA), and the now-defunct Victorian Women's Football League (VWFL).

As of 2026, Preston City Oval is home to the Darebin Falcons in the VFL Women's (VFLW), the Northern Knights in the Talent League and the Preston Cricket Club in the Victorian Sub-District Cricket Association (VSDCA). It was the home of the Preston Football Club from 1887 until the club entered liquidation at the end of the 2025 season.

== History ==
=== Early years ===
In 1876, the Jika Jika Shire Council acquired land in Cramer Street for use as a recreational ground at a cost of £180. The location was agreed upon by councillors because of its central location between both the Preston and Gowerville areas. However, many ratepayers considered the price paid too high, with several councillors losing their seats at the next election because of their decision to purchase the land. Until 1942, the ground was commonly referred to as Preston Park or Cramer Park.

Several short-lived cricket clubs played at Preston Park in its earliest years. In 1880, the Gowerville Cricket Club was formed and shared the ground with the original Preston Cricket Club (which dissolved in 1886). Because there was no grandstand at the time, the playing surface was larger and two cricket pitches were located at the eastern and western sides of the ground.

In 1882, the Preston Football Club (PFC) was formed. The club was initially refused access to Preston Park, despite a letter from club officials to the local council which suggested that "the piece of ground on which the club played was about to be sold". After playing at an unknown paddock during the 1886 season, PFC was granted permission to play their first match at Preston Park on 28 May 1887 against Royal Park. However, when the players arrived for the match, they were informed that permission to use the ground had been revoked, forcing both clubs to clear an adjacent vacant piece of land for the match. The first football match at Preston Park was eventually played on 4 June 1887, with PFC recording a draw against Star of Collingwood.

=== Modern ground ===
When Preston was given permission to enter the Victorian Football Association (VFA) in 1903, the VFA required the ground to undergo several improvements – including adding fencing, ticket boxes and a press box – before the end of the following season. The upgrades were completed in 1904.

Preston shared tenancy of the ground with the Preston Districts Football Club, which competed in the Victorian Junior Football Association (VJFA). In 1908, the usually amiable relationship between the two clubs deteriorated rapidly, as Preston Districts sought senior tenancy of the ground. The dispute attracted several letters to the Preston Leader, but the status quo eventually remained.

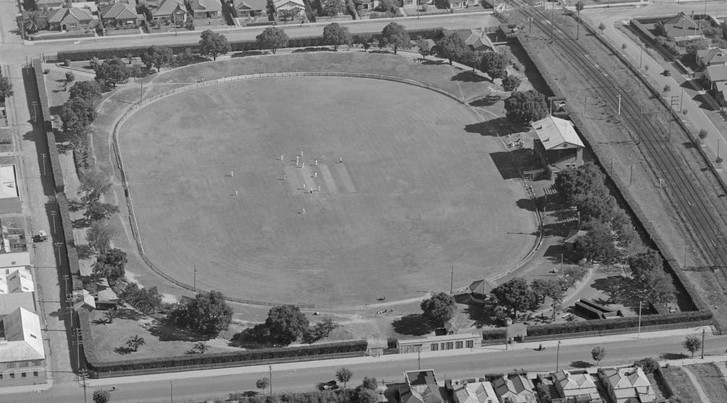
Preston City Oval in February 1948

Following the conclusion of the 1911 VFA season, Preston entered into a merger with the Northcote Football Club. The merged entity was considered a continuation of Northcote, with Preston's trophies and assets transferred to Preston Districts (effectively taking over the VJFA club). During its time back in the VJFA, Preston Park's playing surface deteriorated badly, leading to field umpire Hume lodging a complaint with the VJFA in June 1918, writing that "the Preston ground is in a bad way and the ball at times was quite hidden in the long grass". Preston eventually returned to the VFA in 1926. A grandstand designed by Harry Norris was built on the ground's wing the same year.

From 1910 until the 1950s, the Preston Baseball Club played its home matches at the ground. In August 1928, the Australian Speedways Company met with the local council about the use of Preston City Oval as a speedway venue, with three events taking place at the ground in September 1928.

In the 1960s, the Fitzroy Football Club (FFC) was interested in moving its base from Brunswick Street Oval to Preston, owing to a poor relationship with the Fitzroy Cricket Club. In 1962, it made a request to the Preston Council for a 40-year lease of the venue, but the council decided that the lease could be granted only if FFC and PFC came to agreeable terms, which they did not.

During the 1979 Championship Series organised by the National Football League (NFL), two South Australian National Football League (SANFL) clubs – Port Adelaide and Central District – played matches at Preston City Oval on the Anzac Day public holiday, attracting a crowd of 6,000 people.

The Preston Bullants Junior Football Club (PBJFC) has played matches at Preston City Oval since entering the Yarra Junior Football League (YJFL) in 2001. The Preston Bullants Amateur Football Club (PBAFC) senior women's team played a curtain-raiser to a VFL match at Preston City Oval on 29 May 2022.

When PFC (competing as the Northern Bullants) entered into a reserves affiliation with the Carlton Football Club in 2003, the club's Victorian Football League (VFL) home matches began to be split between Preston City Oval and Carlton's home base of Princes Park. By 2019 (the final year of the affiliation), the club played four of its eleven home matches in Preston.

The ground hosted the Victorian Women's Football League (VWFL) Premier Division grand final in 2007, where a then-VWFL record crowd of 1,000 people saw Darebin defeat Melbourne University by 22 points.

Under naming rights, the ground was known as Australian Motor Finance Oval (AMF Oval) in 2006 and as NAB Oval from 2007 until the end of the 2011 season. In 2022, the ground was renamed to Genis Steel Oval (sometimes mistakenly referred to as Genis Street Oval).

Following its removal from the VFL at the end of the 2025 season, PFC released a statement affirming its support for PBJFC and PBAFC to be granted custody of the ground. The NFNL announced on 24 March 2026 that it would return to hosting its finals matches at the ground.

=== Redevelopments ===
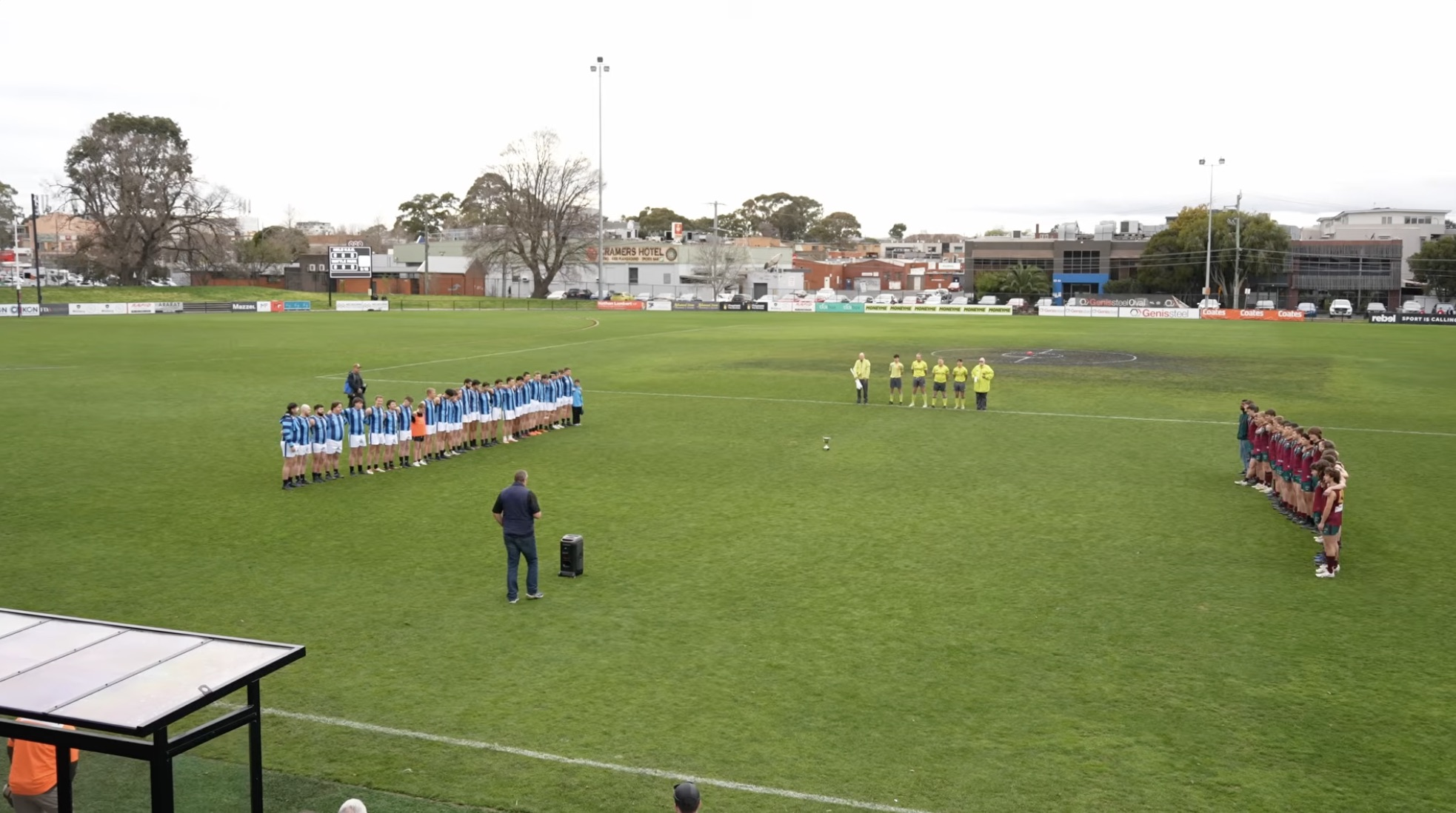
View of Preston City Oval from the grandstand before a match in 2025

Between 2010 and 2012, the ground was redeveloped by Harrison and White. The grandstand was refurbished internally to create a function room (known as the Grandstand Function Centre) which faced onto the oval, with a standing capacity of 300 people. Additionally, a steel platform was built to connect the grandstand with the brick office building that includes coaches' boxes and the home changing rooms.

On 13 July 2018, an electronic scoreboard built by Electronic Signage Australia was opened at the ground. The brick scoreboard building was removed after the 2022 season.

During the 2025 federal election campaign, the Labor Party committed to funding which would upgrade Preston City Oval's lighting and changing rooms. The upgrades are expected to begin by late 2026 and be completed in mid-2027.

== Transport access ==
Preston City Oval is primarily serviced by Mernda line trains at Preston railway station, which is located across the road from the ground. When the railway line was extended to Preston in 1889, it was aligned to bend around the oval, rather than cut through it. During the Level Crossing Removal Project, the site of the cricket nets at Preston City Oval were temporarily occupied while redevelopment at the station occurred.

The venue can also be accessed by taking tram route 11 and walking a short distance from the Miller Street tram stop (or the Cramer Street tram stop). It was previously serviced by tram route 112.

== Records ==
=== Attendance ===
#	Crowd	Game	Date	Ref
1	15,000	Preston vs Northcote (Round 1, 1930 VFA season)	26 April 1930	
1	15,000	Preston vs Oakleigh (Round 7, 1930 VFA season)	9 June 1930	
1	15,000	Preston vs Williamstown (Round 15, 1940 VFA season)	3 August 1940	
4	14,000	Preston vs Northcote (Round 1, 1932 VFA season)	23 April 1932	
5	13,000	Preston vs Port Melbourne (Round 18, 1969 VFA season)	23 August 1969	

Official attendance numbers were not regularly recorded for VFL matches at Preston City Oval. Crowds of 2,000 people were reported for matches in 2006 and 2007.
