= 1885 Victorian football season =

16th senior season of Australian rules football in Victoria

- Date: 18 April – 26 September 1885

The 1885 Victorian football season was the 16th senior season of Australian rules football in the colony of Victoria.

== Clubs ==
=== Founded ===
Future Australian Football League (AFL) club Richmond was founded in 1885.

Club	League	Ref
East Ballarat	Ballarat District	
Richmond	VFA	

== VFA ==
South Melbourne won the Victorian Football Association (VFA) premiership for the second time, having finished the season with 22 wins from its 25 total matches.

== VJFA ==
1885 VJFA season
- Date: 2 May – 26 September 1885
- Premiers: Williamstown Juniors; 1st premiership

The 1885 VJFA season was the third season of the Victorian Junior Football Association (VJFA). (Note: At the time, the term "junior" was used to describe open age football of a lower standard than senior football, rather than under age football.) Williamstown Juniors won the premiership for the first time. The second-rate junior premiership was won by North Carlton Imperial, although Osborne also claimed the premiership.

=== Club records ===
Pos	Team	Pld	W	L	D	GF	GA
1	Williamstown Juniors (P)	22	17	5	0	54	16
2	Brunswick						
3	North Park						
4	South Melbourne Juniors						
5	Port Melbourne						
	Star of Carlton						
	Royal Park						
	Britannia						
	Northcote						

(P) Premiers

== Ballarat District ==
South Ballarat was the premier club in the Ballarat District competition. Ballarat Imperial formed a second twenty (reserves) team at the start of the season. The second-rate junior premiership was won by the Reserve Football Club.

=== Club records ===
Pos	Team	Pld	W	L	D	GF	GA
1	South Ballarat (P)	13	9	3	1	49	29
2	Ballarat Imperial	12	5	7	0	30	38
	Ballarat	12	0	12	0	13	48

(P) Premiers
