= Jack Cole (footballer) =

Australian rules footballer

Personal information
- Full name: Bryan Cole
- Born: 17 August 1956 (age 70)
- Original team: Montmorency
- Height: 178 cm (5 ft 10 in)
- Weight: 81 kg (179 lb)

Playing career^{1}
Years	Club	Games (Goals)
1977–78	Collingwood	2 (0)
- ^{1} Playing statistics correct to the end of 1978.

Bryan "Jack" Cole (born 17 August 1956) is a former Australian rules footballer who played with Collingwood in the Victorian Football League (VFL).

== Playing career ==
Originally from Montmorency, part of Collingwood's recruiting zone, Cole played two senior games for the Magpies – one in each of the 1977 and 1978 seasons – before returning to his home club midway through the latter.

Cole's nickname of "Jack" was a shortening of "Jumping Jack", which was bestowed upon him unknowingly by Montmorency coach Shane Molloy during the club's premiership season of 1979.

== Coaching career ==
Cole was appointed senior coach of Montmorency in 2005 in his first coaching role, at age 48. He remained at the club for six seasons before transferring to coach rival Greensborough for two years in 2011–12. Cole then returned for another two-year stint at Montmorency in 2013.

By 2015, Cole had shifted out of the Northern Football League and took the reins at Healesville, guiding the side to a runners-up performance in his first season. This was Cole's third losing grand final in his coaching career to that point. He broke the duck the following season, when Healesville snapped a 28-year premiership drought to win the 2016 premiership.

After two more seasons at Healesville, Cole joined Woori Yallock in 2018, taking the team as far as a grand final in 2022 before departing at the end of the 2023 season. Cole was signed by Victorian Amateur Football Association (VAFA) club Kew in October 2023 to lead the club from the 2024 season.
