= Preston Districts Football Club =

Names
- Full name: Preston Districts Football Club
- Former name: Preston Presbyterian Football Club (1905−1907)
- Former nickname: Presbys

Club details
- Founded: 1905; 121 years ago
- Dissolved: 1915; 111 years ago
- Colours: Red White
- Ground: Preston Park; Preston North

Uniforms
Home

The Preston Districts Football Club, also known as the Preston District Football Club, was an Australian rules football club based in the Melbourne suburb of Preston. The club was formed in 1905 and competed in the Victorian Junior Football Association (VJFA) from 1907 until amalgamating with the Preston Football Club in 1915.

Preston still compete in the Victorian Football League (VFL) until the end of the 2025 season, wearing the red and white colours of Preston District.

== History ==
=== Early years ===
Preston Districts was formed in 1905 as the Preston Presbyterian Football Club, nicknamed the Presbys. The club was linked to St. David's Presbyterian Church in David St, Preston.

The club played in the Metropolitan Churches Football Association (MCFA) and was successful both on and off the field, finishing fourth in their debut 1905 season and attracting over 600 people to their first annual meeting.

However, at some point during or after the 1906 season, the club was expelled from the MCFA for unknown reasons.

=== VJFA ===
In April 1907, the club changed its name to Preston Districts and entered the Victorian Junior Football Association (VJFA). The club became the reserves team for the Preston Football Club, a former VJFA club which had been competing in the Victorian Football Association (VFA) since 1903. At least one Preston Districts player had played a game for Preston during the 1906 VFA season, prior to the start of the formal affiliation.

Preston Districts immediately struggled in the VJFA, which was unsurprising as they were relying on fringe players from Preston's senior side, which was itself struggling in the VFA. The club also had a "somewhat dubious reputation", and it was reported that they had gone "within an ace" of being banned from the VJFA in 1907.

The clubs shared tenancy of Preston Park, although the reserves also played matches at a ground called "Preston North". In 1908, the usually amiable relationship between the two clubs deteriorated rapidly, as Preston Districts sought senior tenancy of Preston Park. The dispute attracted several letters to the Preston Leader, but the status quo eventually remained.

=== Amalgamation with Preston ===
Following the conclusion of the 1911 VFA season, in which they finished last with only a single win, Preston entered into a merger with the Northcote Football Club. Northcote became known as the Northcote and Preston Football Club (or simply Northcote-Preston) for the next few years, but it played its games in Northcote, retained Northcote's colours, its team in the VFA continued to be known as Northcote, and the merged entity was considered a continuation of the Northcote Football Club.

Officials from encouraged their players to move, but diverted all the club's trophies and assets to Preston Districts. The effective takeover left Preston Districts without a reserves alignment to a VFA team (which was required under VJFA rules), and Preston Districts was forced to align with the Essendon Association Football Club. Both clubs retained their name, colours and home ground, although the VJFA dropped the requirement for a reserves alignment in 1913.

Up until 1915, the Preston Districts name had been retained, but the name changed to Preston prior to the start of the 1916 season, something that Preston officials may have always intended in 1912. This effectively meant Preston Districts ceased to exist, replaced by Preston.

=== VFA return ===
Preston competed in the VJFA until it was admitted into the VFA for the 1926 season. Despite the official merger with Northcote, which saw Preston cease to exist de jure at the time, the Preston club admitted to the VFA in 1926 was considered a de facto continuation of the previous club.

== Seasons ==
Premiers	Grand Finalist	Minor premiers	Finals appearance	Wooden spoon

No coaches, best and fairest winners or leading goalkickers for Preston Districts are known.

The 1912 to 1915 seasons overlap with the season records for Preston.

Year	League	Finish	W	L	D	President	Secretary	Treasurer	Captain	Ref
1905	MCFA	4th								
1906	MCFA									
1907	VJFA	8th	5	13	0					
1908	VJFA	9th	5	13	0					
1909	VJFA	7th	6	12	0					
1910	VJFA									
1911	VJFA	9th	3	15	0					
1912	VJFA					Ralph Hutton	J. Donath	Georgie Hendrie	George La Franchi	
1913	VJFA	5th	8	9	0	J. Williams	F. Paarman	F. Paarman	George La Franchi	
1914	VJFA	6th	4	10	1	J. R. Mills	George M. Eaton	George M. Eaton	George La Franchi	
1915	VJFA	7th	6	12	0	J. R. Mills	George M. Eaton	George M. Eaton	Bill Punch	
