= 1884 VFA season =

8th season of the Victorian Football Association

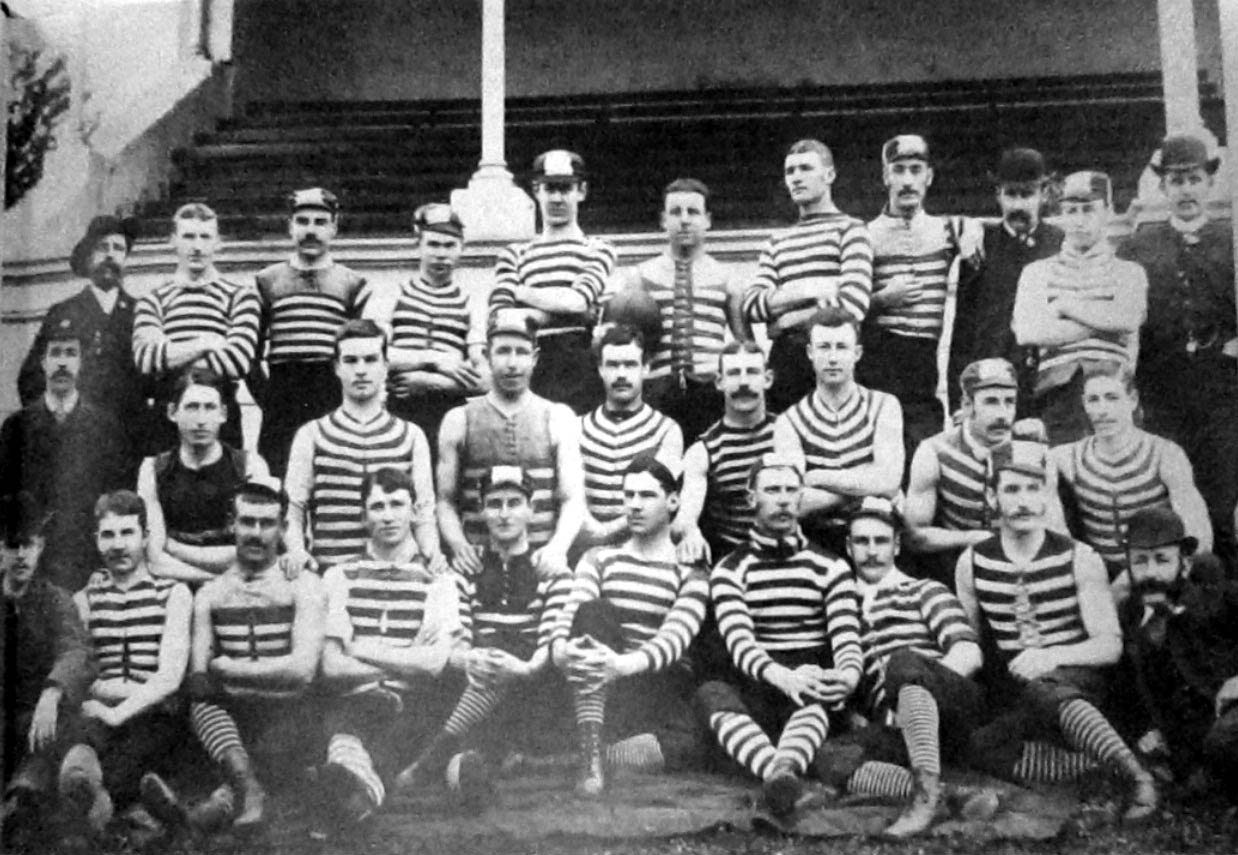
- Geelong – 1884 VFA premiers

Overview
- Date: 3 May – 27 September 1884
- Teams: 8
- Premiers: Geelong; 6th premiership

The 1884 VFA season was the eighth season of the Victorian Football Association (VFA), the highest-level senior Australian rules football competition in the colony of Victoria.

Geelong won the premiership for the fifth time, making it the club's sixth VFA premiership in just seven seasons, and the third in a sequence of three consecutive premierships won from 1882 to 1884.

== Association membership ==
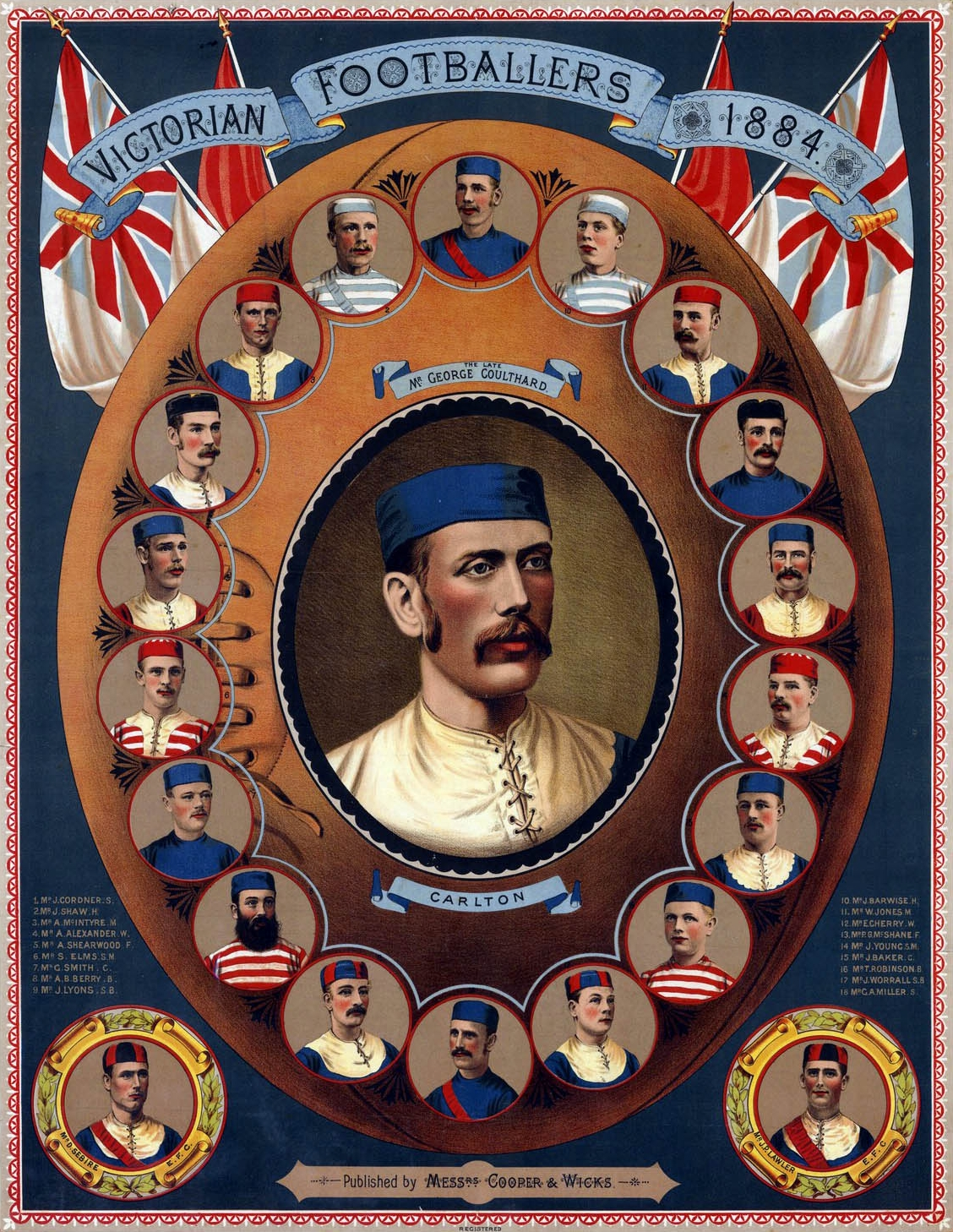
Poster showing star players of the 1884 season. Two players from each club surround the central portrait of Carlton's George Coulthard, the former champion who had died in 1883.

The senior metropolitan membership of the Association (including Geelong) increased from six to eight clubs in 1884. The two new clubs were the Williamstown Football Club, which was elevated from junior status after merging with Battery United, and the newly established Fitzroy Football Club.

At this time, three other provincial senior clubs were full Association members represented on the Board of Management: Ballarat, South Ballarat (formerly known as Albion Imperial) and Horsham Unions. Due to distance, these clubs played too few matches against the rest of the VFA to be considered relevant in the premiership.

== 1884 VFA premiership ==
The 1884 premiership was won by the Geelong Football Club, which won twenty-two and drew one of its twenty-five matches. Essendon finished second with sixteen wins and two draws from twenty-four matches; Hotham finished third.

== Club records ==
The below table details the playing records of the eight clubs in all matches during the 1884 season. Two sets of results are given:

- Senior results: based only upon games played against other VFA senior clubs
- Total results: including senior games, and games against intercolonial, up-country and junior clubs.

The clubs are listed in the order in which they were ranked in the Sportsman newspaper. The VFA had no formal process by which the clubs were ranked, so the below order should be considered indicative only, particularly since the fixturing of matches was not standardised; however, the top three placings were later acknowledged in publications including the Football Record and are considered official.

Pos	Team	Senior results						Total results					
Pos	Team	Pld	W	L	D	GF	GA	Pld	W	L	D	GF	GA
1	Geelong (P)	14	12	1	1	67	27	25	22	2	1	141	52
2	Essendon	17	10	5	2	57	44	24	16	6	2	99	59
3	Hotham	18	8	7	3	47	47	22	12	7	3	65	48
	Fitzroy	16	7	8	1	27	29	22	9	10	3	34	42
	South Melbourne	19	6	8	5	42	42	23	9	9	5	54	48
	Carlton	17	6	9	2	39	53	24	11	9	4	64	67
	Melbourne	18	6	11	1	38	54	26	10	13	3	64	74
	Williamstown	13	2	8	3	20	41	21	8	8	5	41	46

(P) Premiers

== See also ==
- 1884 Victorian football season
