= Croxton Park, Victoria =

Sports venue in Northcote, Victoria

Croxton Park
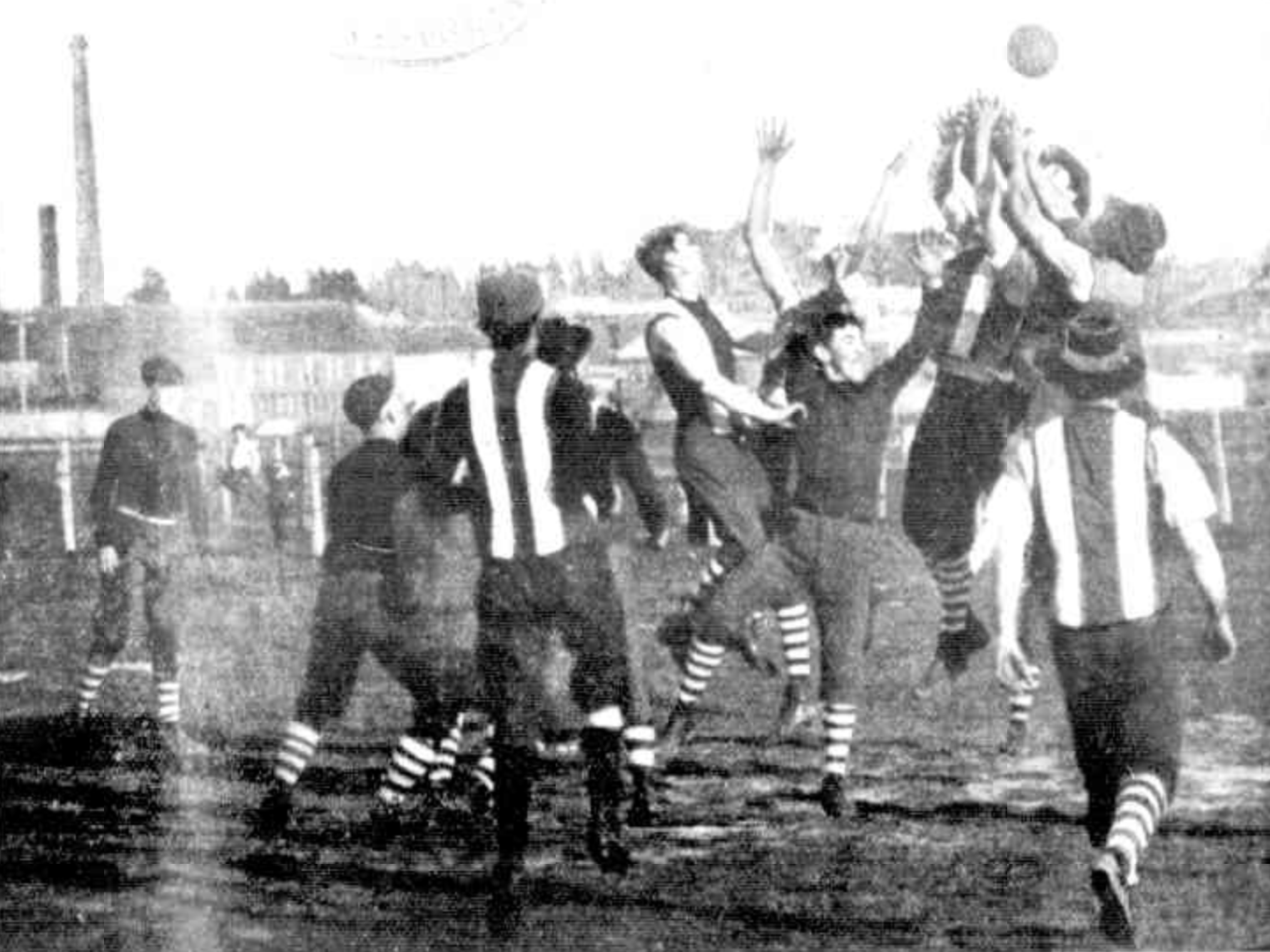
- Interactive map of Croxton Park
- Location: Woolton Avenue and High Street, Northcote, Victoria
- Coordinates: 37°45′43″S 144°59′54″E
- Owner: Croxton Park Hotel
- Surface: Grass

Construction
- Opened: 1865
- Closed: 1918

Tenants
- Northcote (1899–1903, 1909–1914); Rose of Northcote (1904–1908); City of Northcote (1915–1918)

Croxton Park was a multi-purpose sports venue located in present-day Northcote and Thornbury, Victoria. It comprised a horse racing track which was in use from 1865 until 1873, and a grassed oval used for Australian rules football and other sports until the 1910s.

Unlike most major sports venues in Melbourne, which were council owned, Croxton Park was privately owned by the proprietors of the adjoining Croxton Park Hotel, which proved controversial for its proximity to alcohol service and for behaviour of patrons. The sports venue was closed and the land sold for housing in 1918, while the hotel itself remains to the present day.

== History ==
Croxton Park's history began when the Pilgrim Inn was first licensed in 1844 on Plenty Rd, in what became the township of Northcote in 1853. In 1865, new licence holder Josiah Goyder renamed the venue the Red House Inn, and developed the private paddocks behind the hotel into a sports venue for horse racing and other events. It was the first privately owned racetrack in Melbourne, and the first races at the Red House Racetrack took place on 28 October 1865; and regular horse racing meetings, walking and running races and pigeon shooting events were held at Red House during Goyder's proprietorship.

In 1869, the licence and lease for the hotel and grounds passed to billiards player Charles Hitchen, who renamed the venue Croxton Park the hotel the Croxton Park Hotel, named after an English sporting pub. Posts, rails and grandstands were erected to mark out the 12-furlong racecourse between High St and St Georges Rd, and the new course operated under Victorian Racing Club rules. However, the quality of racing at the venue was not strong, and the racecourse's short existence came to an end in 1873, when the lease expired and much of the land was sold for housing. By 1874, the grandstand had been moved to the new Kensington Park racecourse.

A smaller grassed oval was retained behind the hotel, still used for running, hunting, pigeon shooting, and occasionally for football and cricket. The playing of football and cricket at the venue increased after the Randall family took over the hotel in 1889 and redeveloped the oval. The Northcote Cricket Club, now of Victorian Premier Cricket, played there until 1900, and the Northcote Football Club, then of the Victorian Junior Football Association, began playing regularly at the venue in the late 1890s.

The fact that Croxton Park adjoined a private licensed establishment became a source of ongoing controversy. It gained a reputation for unruly and drunken behaviour of its patrons, and the direct connection between the grounds and the hotel was opposed by local churches and the temperance movement. The fact that the ground had private ownership, and hence that its proprietor could profit from sports, was also highly unusual when most sports were played on council grounds, and not always well received – including by the council itself, which preferred events be played on its own ground at Northcote Park. Nevertheless, Croxton Park had many supporters, including those who preferred it to Northcote Park for its proximity to central Northcote town, as well as for the hotel.

This meant that while Croxton Park always had a football tenant, those tenancies were often controversial and changeable. The Northcote Football Club (VJFA) played at the ground from 1899 until 1903, before crowd behaviour prompted the VJFA to force the club to move to the newly improved Northcote Park. The following year, the rival Rose of Northcote Football Club was formed, also in the VJFA, and was permitted to play at Croxton Park throughout its existence from 1904 until 1908. In 1909, after further upgrades to Croxton Park, the Northcote Football Club (now playing in the Victorian Football Association) returned to the venue and played there until 1914. Then, in 1915, after a bitter split within the club's committee, Northcote moved back to Northcote Park, where a new grandstand had just been opened; the faction of the club's committee loyal to Croxton Park formed a new club, the City of Northcote Football Club, which played there in the VFJA from 1915 until 1918 – with the exception of 1917 when it sat out of football.

Croxton Park's playing days ended at the end of the 1918 season after the deaths of two of the Randall brothers and the transfer of the hotel's licence to Grace Hardess. The ground was soon subdivided and sold for housing.

=== Other ===
The Croxton Park Hotel continues to operate as a licensed venue to the present day. A ballroom was constructed on the rear of the hotel during the mid-20th century, and it became a major venue for live music in the 1970s. The live music facilities at the venue reopened as the Croxton Bandroom in 2015.

Although Croxton has never been a suburb in its own right, the locality in northern Northcote and southern Thornbury remains known as Croxton, and has had its own train station by that name since 1889.

A second horse racecourse briefly existed under the Croxton Park name, but was soon renamed the Fitzroy Racecourse. This pony racing venue on the western side of St Georges Rd operated from 1891 until 1931, and was privately owned by John Wren, but was never directly associated with the Croxton Park Hotel.
