= 1886 Victorian football season =

17th senior season of Australian rules football in Victoria

- Date: 1 May – 2 October 1886

The 1886 Victorian football season was the 17th senior season of Australian rules football in the colony of Victoria.

== Clubs ==
=== Founded ===
Club	League	Ref
Camberwell	VJFA	
Hawthorn Juniors	VJFA	
Koroit		
Prahran	VFA	
South Williamstown	VFA	
Williamstown CYMS		

=== Name changes ===
Former	New	League	Ref
Cremone	Richmond Juniors	VJFA	

== VFA ==
Geelong won the Victorian Football Association (VFA) premiership for the seventh time.

== VJFA ==
1886 VJFA season
- Premiers: North Park; 1st premiership

The 1886 VJFA season was the fourth season of the Victorian Junior Football Association (VJFA). (Note: At the time, the term "junior" was used to describe open age football of a lower standard than senior football, rather than under age football.) North Park won the premiership for the first time, beginning a sequence of five premierships won by the club between 1886 and 1890.

Elgin Union and Kilmore were admitted into the VJFA on 27 May 1886.

=== Club records ===
Pos	Team	Pld	W	L	D	GF	GA
1	North Park (P)	18	16	0	2	57	9
2	Richmond Juniors						
3	Elgin Union						
4	South Melbourne Juniors						
5	Britannia						
6	Normanby						
	Brighton						
	Camberwell						
	Hawthorn Juniors						
	Kilmore						
	Lilydale						
	South St Kilda						

(P) Premiers

== Ballarat District ==
South Ballarat was the premier club in the Ballarat District competition.

=== Club records ===
Pos	Team	Pld	W	L	D	GF	GA
1	South Ballarat (P)	18	13	4	1	88	43
2	Ballarat Imperial	12	3	7	2	42	59
	Ballarat	17	2	12	3	33	71

(P) Premiers
