= Britannia Football Club =

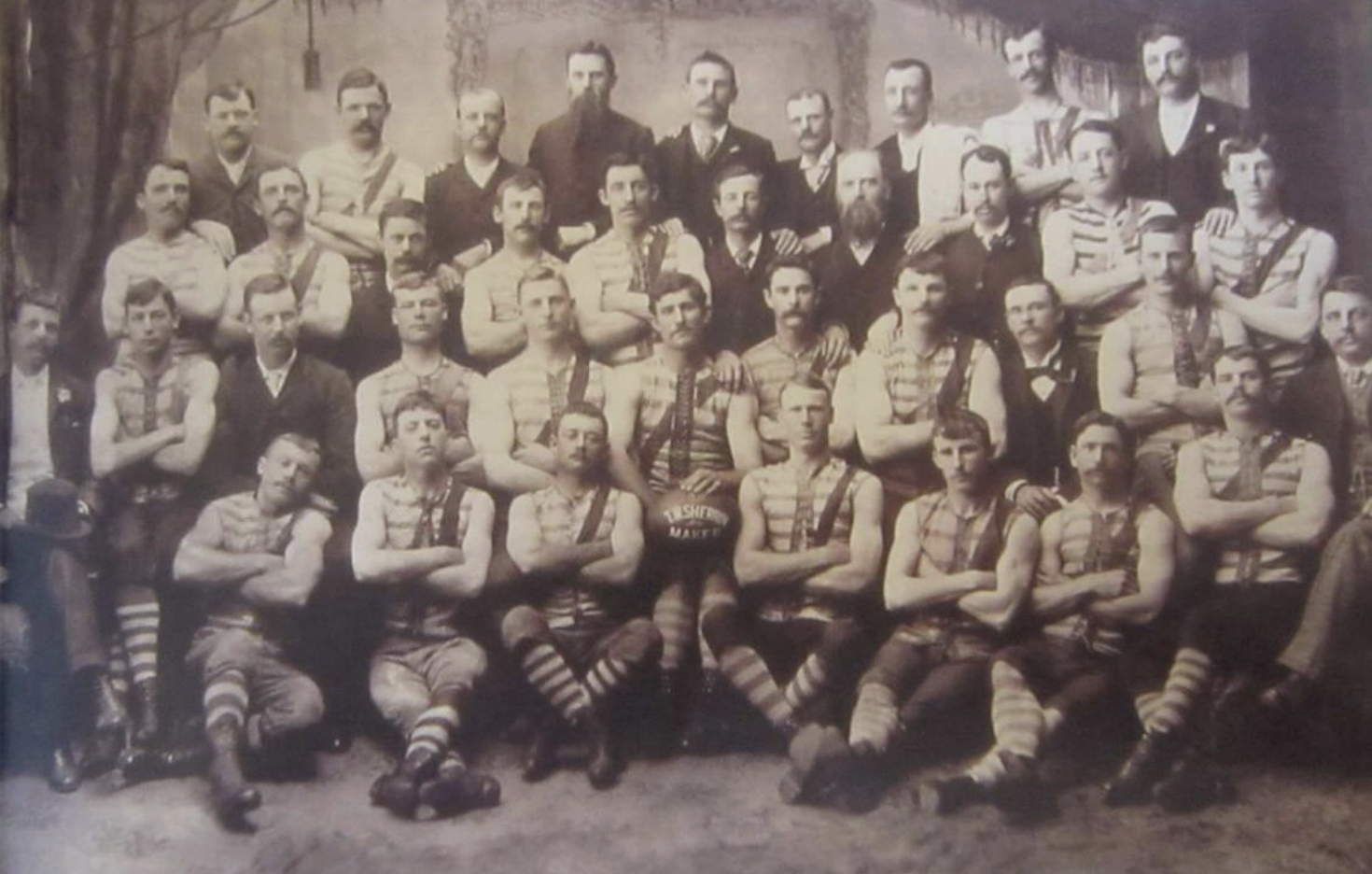

Names
- Full name: Britannia Football Club
- Nickname: Brits

Club details
- Founded: 1877; 149 years ago
- Dissolved: Early 1892; 134 years ago
- Colours: Blue Red White
- Ground: Victoria Park (1882–1892)

The Britannia Football Club, nicknamed the Brits, was an Australian rules football club based in the Melbourne suburb of Abbotsford. It was one of the strongest clubs in the earliest years of the Victorian Junior Football Association (VJFA) (Note: At the time, the term "junior" was used to describe open age football of a lower standard than senior football, rather than under age football.) and was a precursor to the Collingwood Football Club.

== History ==
Britannia was formed in 1877 by James Cohn and P.H. Cherry at the Crown and Anchor Hotel in Collingwood. Alf Cherry was the club's first secretary. It joined the junior competition in 1878, playing its earliest matches at the Willow Flat and Richmond Paddock. The club moved to Victoria Park in 1882 and became an inaugural team in the Victorian Junior Football Association (VJFA) in 1883.

Although only limited records exist, Britannia was known as one of the strongest teams in the VJFA. After finishing approximately fourth in 1884, the club approached the Victorian Football Association (VFA) for admission into the highest-level senior competition, but were denied after the VFA deemed the club was "too disorganised". Remaining in the VJFA, Britannia finished fifth in 1886, third in 1888 and 1889, and second in 1891.

After local residents established a new "Collingwood Football Club" at the City Hotel in June 1889, the club made a second attempt to enter the VFA in June 1889 as "Collingwood-Britannia". This proposal had the support of two Victorian Legislative Assembly members, William Beazley and George Langridge, but it was again denied on the basis of the club being "too disorganised and amateurish". The VFA did not object to admitting Britannia if Victoria Park was upgraded, but refused to demote weaker teams to allow for Britannia's entry.

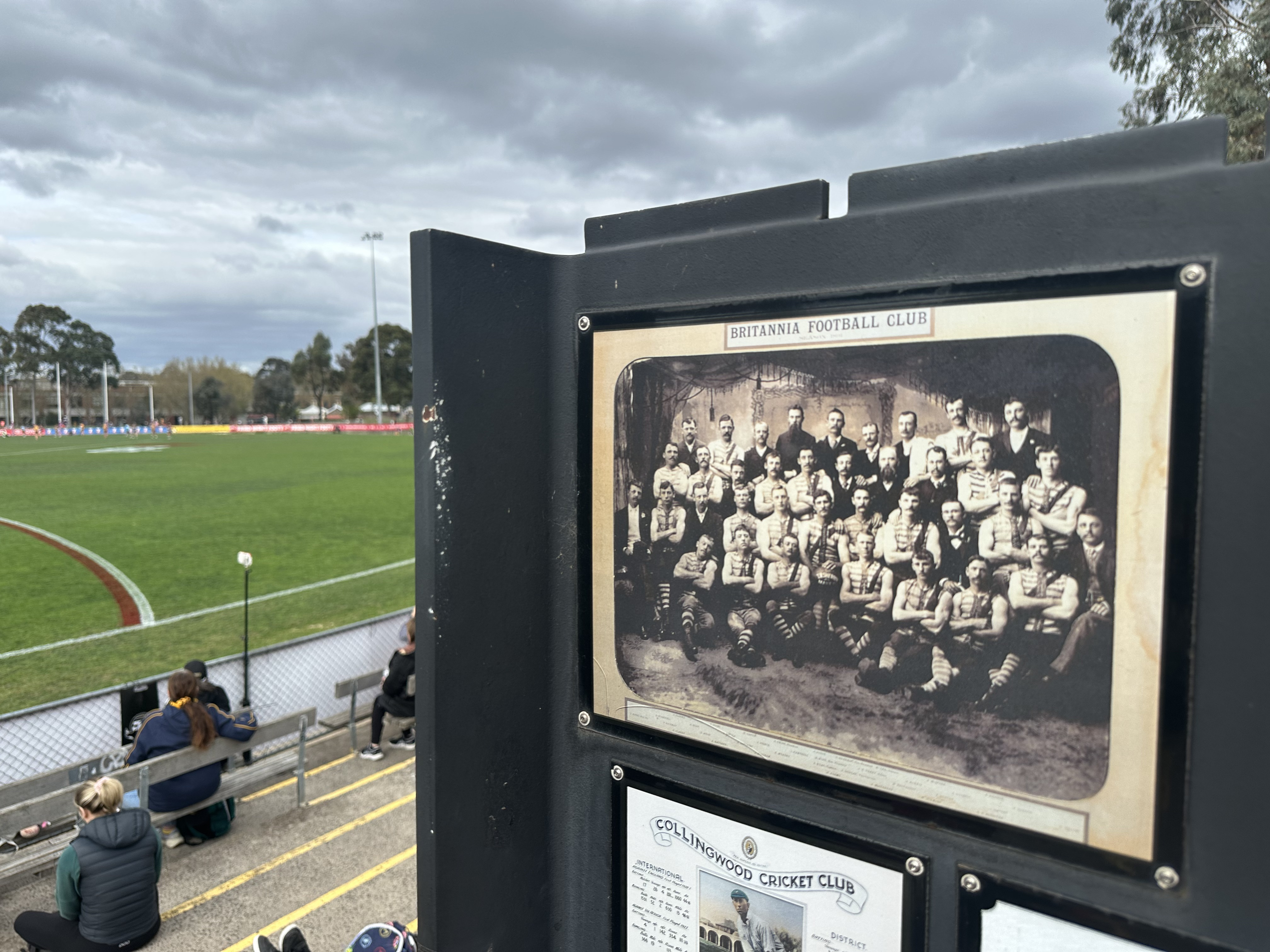
An image of Britannia's 1891 team, as seen at Victoria Park in 2025

Britannia disbanded following a meeting at the Grace Darling Hotel in early 1892 after the VFA had given assurance that a new team from Collingwood would be admitted, with Britannia members concluding that their club would not be able to compete against the new team. The modern-day Collingwood Football Club was formed shortly after on 12 February 1892, entering the VFA the same year.

Many of Britannia's players and officials joined the Fitzroy Football Club. Those who did move to Collingwood included Alf Dean (who captained Britannia) and Bill Proudfoot. The game bell used by Britannia was taken by club officials to Fitzroy's Brunswick Street Oval until it was returned to Victoria Park when Fitzroy moved to Princes Park in 1967.

One of Britannia's last-surviving members was A. Barrie, who was noted in an article published by The Herald in 1931. Another pioneer of the club was lawn bowler Louis Joseph Belinfante (1860–1954).
