= AFL Record =

Newspaper in Australia

- AFL Record cover from 23 March 2017
- Editor: Michael Lovett
- Production editor: Gary Hancock; Brendan Rhodes
- Photo editor: Jayden McFarlane; Rohan Voigt
- Former editors: Greg Hobbs
- Staff writers: Ashley Browne; Ethan Daffey; Hugh Fitzpatrick; Lachlan Geleit; Jack Makeham; Seb Mottram; Nic Negrepontis; Laurence Rosen; Zac Sharpe; Paddy Sinnott; Andrew Slevison
- Photographer: Michael Willson; Dylan Burns
- Categories: Australian rules football
- Frequency: Weekly
- Format: Matchday programme (A4)
- Circulation: 60,000
- Founded: 27 April 1912
- Company: Sports Entertainment Network
- Country: Australia
- Based in: Southbank, Victoria
- Website: aflrecord.com.au

The AFL Record is the official matchday program of the Australian Football League (AFL). The publication began as the Football Record in Melbourne in 1912, making it one of the oldest magazines in Australia.

The Record, in its current format, is owned and produced by Sports Entertainment Network. Physical editions are available for purchase at all nine weekly matches, and digital versions are available to access online. As of 2023, the outgoing editor of the AFL Record is Michael Lovett, who has edited the publication since 1997.

== History ==
The publication began as the Football Record in Melbourne, Australia on 27 April 1912, making it one of the oldest magazines in Australia. It was initially formatted as a pocketbook guide to assist spectators of matches when the league was known as the VFL. The guide helped identify players on the field. As only their numbers were worn on their guernseys, the record contained a list of player names so that spectators could tell who is who.

Over time, the record included a section for keeping track of how many goals and behinds players have kicked while the game is being played and this became a traditional pastime of many footy spectators, something which is fairly unusual to the game. Special interest articles were also added, as well as scores, reports and updates from other leagues around the country.

The AFL Record was known as the Football Record until 1998; in 1999, the current title was adopted. In July 2018, the AFL sold the AFL Record and its related products to Crocmedia (now known as Sports Entertainment Network) in an $8.1 million deal. The sports media company took all weekly match-day magazine content, including the AFL Record, AFL Women's publications, and the AFL Record Season Guide.

== Today's Record ==
Today's official AFL Record is published in a sports magazine style format. Nine different versions (one for each game) were published for each weekly round (60,000 copies in total) prior to 2022 and Roy Morgan Research estimated in 2014 that the Record has a weekly readership of over 200,000.

To reduce costs, the format for the record changed in the 1990s with the advent of the national league to include an outer magazine which covers regular columns and stories about the entire league and an insert with specifics on the current game such as teamsheets and scoresheets.

With the advent of themed rounds in the AFL, the Record is often themed accordingly, with issues such as "Women's round", for example, containing articles about women's involvement in the game. Many themed rounds are repeated annually, such as the ANZAC Day edition, Hall of Fame, Derby Day, Showdown, Indigenous or "Dreamtime" round, the "Big Freeze", and Maddy's Round. In addition, players who reach a milestone of 250, 300 or 350 AFL games are typically honoured with a front cover and a feature story.

The Grand Final Record is typically more expensive and has significantly more content. It is distributed in newsagents, available the Monday prior to the Grand Final (the "News Stand Edition") as well as at the game (the "Match Day Edition"). These were discontinued after a time.

During 2009 to 2011, the week's records are now published and are able to be viewed in an "online magazine" format.

In late March 2020, following the COVID-19 lockdowns and as crowds were no longer permitted to attend AFL matches, Crocmedia began publishing a digital version of the Record. They were also sold in newsagents in Victoria. Links to these digital editions are made available via the Record's social media pages such as Instagram, Facebook and Twitter, and the SEN website.

During 2021 and 2022, a single standard version of the AFL Record is published weekly, containing information on all nine games. This replaces the previous format of one unique magazine per game. It is available at Coles, Victorian newsagents, as well as at every AFL game. However, exclusive variant covers are available at some games. This has been returned to the normal game specific versions as of 2023.

== Publication details ==
- AFL record: official program of the Australian Football League. ISSN 1444-2973. 1999- to current date
- Football record 1912–1998. ISSN 1324-8340 Victorian Football League, -1989; Australian Football League, 1990–1998.

Vol. 1 no.1 (27 Apr. 1912)-v. 87, no.26 (26 Sept. 1998).
