= Yarroweyah Football Club =

Yarroweyah

Names
- Full name: Yarroweyah Football Netball Club
- Nickname(s): Hoppers

Club details
- Founded: 1955; 70 years ago
- Colours: green gold
- Competition: Picola & District
- President: Philip 'Poppy' Muscara
- Ground(s): Yarroweyah Sports Reserve

Uniforms
Home

Other information
- Official website: yarroweyahfnc.com.au

The Yarroweyah Football Netball Club, nicknamed the Hoppers, was an Australian rules football and netball club playing in the Picola & District Football League. The club was based in the small town of Yarroweyah, Victoria.

A Yarroweyah Football Club competed in the Murray Border Football Association between 1893 and 1901, and football was certainly being played in the town prior to that, but the current club of that name was not born until 1955, commencing in the Picola & District Football League - the competition it still calls home to this day.

In recent years, the club has struggled to find the numbers to be able to field teams and folded at the end of 2024. In 2016, the seniors team finished in last position, winning only one match for the year.

== Premierships ==
League	Total flags	Premiership year(s)
Picola & District Football League (NW)	6	1963, 1970, 1972, 1980, 1985, 1988
