= 1882 VFA season =

6th season of the Victorian Football Association

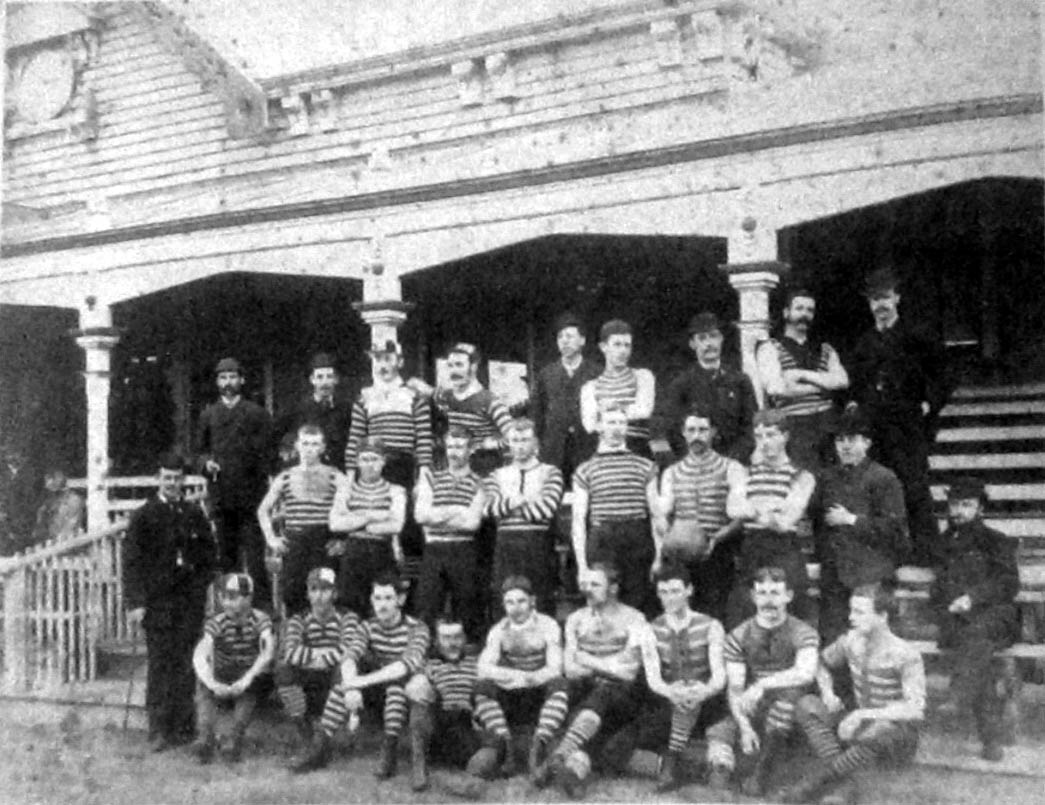
- Geelong – 1882 VFA premiers

Overview
- Date: 22 April – 30 September 1882
- Teams: 7
- Premiers: Geelong; 4th premiership
- Leading goalkicker: Hugh McLean (Geelong − 25 goals)

The 1882 VFA season was the sixth season of the Victorian Football Association (VFA), the highest-level senior Australian rules football competition in the colony of Victoria.

Geelong won the premiership for the fourth time, making it the club's fourth VFA premiership in just five seasons, and the first in a sequence of three consecutive premierships won from 1882 to 1884.

== Association membership ==
The senior metropolitan membership of the Association (including Geelong) during 1882 was seven, the same clubs that had competed in 1881: Carlton, East Melbourne, Essendon, Geelong, Hotham, Melbourne, and South Melbourne.

At this time, three other provincial senior clubs were full Association members represented on the Board of Management for a total membership of ten: Ballarat, Benalla and Horsham. Due to distance, these clubs played too few matches against the rest of the VFA to be considered relevant in the premiership.

== Premiership season ==
=== Club records ===
The below table details the playing records of the seven clubs in all matches during the 1882 season, where the information is available. Two sets of results are given:

- Senior results: based only upon games played against other VFA senior clubs.
- Total results: including senior games, and games against intercolonial, up-country and junior clubs.

While East Melbourne was a senior club, in practice they played to a junior standard, and in its few matches against the other senior clubs were routinely beaten by large margins. Consequently, the Australasian and the Leader newspapers did not include matches against East Melbourne in teams' senior results, and this approach has been replicated in the table below.

The clubs are listed in the order in which they were ranked in the Australasian newspaper. The VFA had no formal process by which the clubs were ranked, so the below order should be considered indicative only, particularly since the fixturing of matches was not standardised; however, the top three placings were later acknowledged in publications including the Football Record and are considered official.

Pos	Team	Senior results						Total results					
Pos	Team	Pld	W	L	D	GF	GA	Pld	W	L	D	GF	GA
1	Geelong (P)	13	10	1	2	51	11	24	20	2	2	120	19
2	Essendon	12	5	2	5	35	24	23	14	3	6	85	38
3	South Melbourne	13	6	3	4	35	32	23	15	4	4	77	42
	Carlton	13	5	4	4	42	34	21	12	4	5	70	41
	Hotham	13	4	9	0	22	48	21	11	10	0	42	50
	Melbourne	16	1	12	3	27	63	23	6	13	4	53	70
	East Melbourne	6	0	6	0	0	35	14	5	7	2	17	44

(P) Premiers

== Notable events ==
- James Garton replaced Sir William Clarke as president of the Association. Clarke had served in the role since 1877.
- The leading goalkicker for the season was Hugh McLean (Geelong), who kicked a new Association record of 25 goals (15 in senior matches).
- Several leading clubs went on interstate trips during the season:
  - South Melbourne travelled to South Australia in June, winning four matches against local clubs and winning one game at odds against a combined team of local juniors.
  - Geelong travelled to New South Wales in July, winning three matches against local clubs, one against the combined New South Wales team, and one against Albury.
  - Essendon travelled to Tasmania in August, winning three matches against regional teams and one against the combined state team.
  - Victoria was also visited by South Australian club Norwood in June and July, which won one out of three matches against VFA clubs.

== See also ==
- 1882 Victorian football season
