= Victorian Junior Football Association =

Australian rules football competition

- Most recent season or competition: 1932 VFA season
- Founded: 26 April 1883; 143 years ago
- Ceased: 1932; 94 years ago
- Replaced by: VFA Second Eighteens
- State: (Victoria (state)) Victoria
- Most premierships: Yarraville (7 premierships)
- Official website: VJFA Constitution

The Victorian Junior Football Association (VJFA) was an open age Australian rules football competition and administrative body. It was the first successful junior football competition in Melbourne, and was in existence from 1883 until 1932.

For most of its history, the VJFA was a competition of independent junior level clubs, before it eventually transitioned to become the second eighteens competition for the senior Victorian Football Association (VFA).

== History ==
During the 1870s in Victoria, junior football – which was the term used at the time for open age football of a lower standard than senior football, rather than for under age football – was mostly administered on an ad hoc basis. Several short-lived junior associations had been attempted, but none were successful until the Victorian Junior Football Association was established on 26 April 1883. Eleven clubs – Albion, Brunswick, Emerald Hill, Footscray, Fortrose, North Park, Richmond, South Park, South Yarra, Star of Carlton and Waverley – were represented at the inaugural meeting.

The VJFA, in addition to serving as an administrative body for junior football, ran the junior premiership. At its peak in the early 1890s when it was the only top junior football competition, more than twenty-five clubs competed, and from 1892 until 1894 the competition ran in two divisions to manage its numbers. The establishment of other junior football competitions – including the Victorian Second-Rate (1890), Third-Rate (1892) and Fourth-Rate (1893) Junior Football Associations and the Metropolitan Junior Football Association (1892) – saw numbers in the VJFA premiership decline rapidly through the 1890s, and by 1899 only seven clubs competed in the VJFA. Eight to twelve teams typically contested the premiership thereafter.

At the 1895 VJFA AGM, the competition was reduced from 20 teams to 12 teams. Those who survived were Albert-park, Albion United, Austral, Brighton, Brunswick, Collingwood Juniors, Essendon District, Fitzroy Juniors, Hawthorn, Preston, Richmond City, and West Melbourne Juniors. Some of these clubs, including Camberwell, were later readmitted to the competition.

The competition typically featured smaller clubs from districts already represented in senior football, or the top clubs from other districts. Four successful VJFA clubs from growing districts – West Melbourne, Preston, Northcote and Yarraville – ultimately went on to play senior football in the Victorian Football Association. In 1905, John Wren donated a silver shield to serve as a semi-perpetual trophy for the VJFA premiers; like many trophies of the era, it was held temporarily by the reigning premiers, then won permanently by the first team to win it three times. A total of five Wren Shields were awarded during the trophy's history.

=== 1912 grand final ===
The 1912 grand final was especially controversial. Port Melbourne Railway United won the match by three points, but Yarraville successfully protested one of Railway United's second quarter goals on the grounds of goal umpire error, and the match was reversed to a three-point Yarraville victory.

Although they had the right to challenge, Railway United refused to play as its own act of protest. At a special meeting of the VJFA, it was proposed that "the club, office bearers and registered players for 1912 be disqualified for life". Although Yarraville offered to play a substitute team, it was decided that no match would be held, and Yarraville retained the 1912 premiership.

Railway United was ultimately not expelled from the VJFA, and went on to win the VJFA premiership the following season, defeating Yarraville in the 1913 grand final.

=== Transition to VFA seconds ===
The VJFA had ties to the VFA from early on, with many clubs serving as the reserves team for a senior VFA club. In 1912, a rule was in place mandating that clubs align themselves to a VFA club, although that requirement was dropped in 1913.

The VJFA eventually formally transitioned to become the VFA Second Eighteens during the 1920s. This began in 1924, when the competition expanded from twelve teams to eighteen in two divisions – one division set aside for clubs who played on the same grounds as their senior VFA counterparts, and one for clubs with their own grounds. All Melbourne-based senior VFA clubs were required to affiliate with a junior team in the VJFA, and an agreement was put in place to lift some restrictions on in-season player movements between the senior or junior clubs, making the affiliated junior clubs functionally closer to seconds teams.

The divisions were called Division 1 and Division 2 in 1924, (Note: In 1924, The Age described the division with Hawthorn and North Melbourne (both VFA clubs) as "Second Division", while The Argus described it as "First Division". The Port Melbourne Historical and Preservation Society describes the division with standalone clubs as "Section A" and the division with VFA-affiliated clubs as "Section B".) but from 1925 onwards they were known as the VJFA Section and the VFA Section.

In 1926, after the 1924 player transfer agreement ended, the VFA moved to convert its affiliated junior clubs into genuine second eighteens controlled by the senior clubs; and, starting from 1928, all other clubs were excluded and the VJFA served wholly as a VFA seconds competition, with free player interchanges between senior and junior level permitted until 1 August each year.

The VJFA can be considered to have ceased to exist, replaced by the VFA Second Eighteens, starting from the 1928 season; however, the VJFA name and the Wren Shield as a premiership trophy were both retained until the end of 1932. It was only at this point that competition was formally renamed the VFA Second Eighteens and the Wren Shield was discontinued. The VFA Second Eighteens and its successors, continued to operate until the end of the 2017 season.

== Clubs ==
Over 100 clubs are believed to have competed in the VJFA (the below list is incomplete).

Club	Colours	Moniker	Home venue	Former league	Formed	Years in VJFA	VJFA premierships		Fate
Club	Colours	Moniker	Home venue	Former league	Formed	Years in VJFA	Total	Most recent	Fate
Brighton		Penguins	Brighton Beach Oval, Brighton	—	1881	1889−1891	0	—	Moved to the MJFA in 1892
Britannia		Brits	Victoria Park, Abbotsford	—	1877	1883−1891	0	—	Folded in 1892
City of Northcote			Croxton Park, Northcote	—	1915	1915−1916; 1918	0	—	Folded in 1918
Collingwood District		Districts	Victoria Park, Abbotsford	MJFA	1915	1918	0	—	Moved to the VJFL in 1919
Kew		Bears	Victoria Park, Kew	RDFA	1870	1889−1896; 1920−1926	0	—	Moved to the VFLSD in 1927
Port Melbourne Railway United		Portsmen	Richmond City Reserve, Richmond	—	1902	1907−1915; 1917−1927	3	1914	Folded in 1939
South Melbourne Districts		Bloods	—	—	1912	1914−1926	1	1924	Moved to the VFLSD in 1927
Yarraville		Eagles	Yarraville Oval, Yarraville	—	1903	1903−1927	7	1926	Moved to the VFA in 1928

Club	Colours	Moniker	Est.	Seasons	Premierships	Years of premierships	Current league							
Club	Colours	Moniker	Est.	Seasons	Premierships	Years of premierships	Current league	Albert Park	Parkites	1895	1895−1???	2	1896, 1897	Folded
Albion United			1883	1883−1890s	0		Folded							
Ascot Vale			18??	18??−1???; 1916−19??	0									
Austral				1890s−1890s	0		Folded							
Brighton			1885	1889−1895	0		Folded; 1964							
Britannia		Brits	1877	1883−1891	0									
Brunswick District				1915	0									
Brunswick seconds		Brickfielders	1865	19??−1932	2	1931, 1932	Folded; 1991							
Camberwell		Tricolours	1886	1888−94; 1913−14; 1916−19	0		Folded; 1995							
Cambridge Star			18??	18??−1???	0									
Carnegie			1920s	1923−192?	0		Folded c. 2000							
City of Northcote			1915	1915−16; 1918	0		Folded; 1918							
Clifton			18??	18??−1???	0									
Coast			18??	18??−1???	0									
Coburg (original)			18??	18??−1???	0									
Coburg			1891	1891−1912	0		VFL							
Coburg seconds			1891	1925−1932	3	1928, 1929, 1930	In recess							
Collingwood District		Districts	1906	1918	0		Merged; 1938 with Collingwood							
Collingwood Juniors		Magpies	1893	1893−1905	0		VFL as Collingwood reserves							
East Richmond			18??	18??−1???	0									
Electric Telegraph			18??	18??−1???	0									
Essendon District		Dons		1890s−1900s	0									
Essendon Juniors		Dreadnoughts		1921	0		Folded; 1921							
Fairfield			1???	1916−19??	0									
Fernside			18??	18??−1???	0									
Fitzroy Crescent			18??	18??−1???	0									
Fitzroy Imperials			18??	18??−1???	0									
Fitzroy Juniors		Maroons	1883	1892−1911	2	1894, 1911	VAFA as Fitzroy reserves							
Footscray Juniors		Bulldogs	1877	1883−1924	2	1907, 1915, 1918	VFL as Footscray reserves							
Hawthorn (original)			1893	1893−1898	0		Folded; 1899							
Hawthorn Juniors		Mayblooms	1902	1924	0		In recess							
Kew		Bears	1876	1889−96; 1920−26	0		VAFA							
Kingsville				1900s−1927	1	1927								
Marylebone			1883	1883−1890s	1	1891								
Melbourne Juniors		Redlegs	1858	1885−1924	1	1922	In recess							
Moonee Ponds			18??	18??−1???	0									
Montague			18??	18??−1???	0									
Napier Imperial				1880s−1895	1	1893								
North Carlton			18??	18??−1???	0									
North Melbourne Juniors		Shinboners	1858	1890s−1???	1	1899	VFL as North Melbourne reserves							
North Park			1883	1883−1???	5	1886, 1887, 1888, 1889, 1890								
North Williamstown					1	1892								
Northcote		Cotes	1869	1880s−1907	2	1904, 1906	Folded; 1987							
Northcote Diggers		Diggers	19??	1921−19??	0									
Parkside			18??	18??−1???	0									
Pembroke			1???	19??−1???	0									
Port Melbourne Railway United		Portsmen, Ways	1902	1907−1915; 1917−1927	3	1910, 1913, 1914	Folded c. 1939							
Prahran Juniors		Two Blues	1899	1920−19??	0									
Preston		Tonners	1882	1890−1902; 1912−25	5	1900, 1901, 1902, 1921, 1923	VFL as Northern Bullants							
Preston Districts			1905	1907−1915	0		Merged; 1915 with Preston							
Preston Star			18??	18??−1???	0									
Richmond City		Richmondites	1880s	1883−1901	0		Merged; 1902 with West Richmond (now Richmond reserves − VFL)							
Richmond Juniors		Tigers	1902	1902−1920s	0		VFL as Richmond reserves							
Rose of Northcote			1904	1904−1908	0									
South Brunswick			18??	18??−1???	0									
South Melbourne Districts		Bloods	1912	1914−1926	1	1924	VAFA							
South Melbourne Juniors		Southerers	1900	1901−19??	1	1903								
South Park			18??	18??−1???	0									
South St Kilda			c. 1870s	1883−18??	0		Folded; 1899							
St Kilda Esplanade			18??	18??−1???	0									
St Kilda Grosvenor			18??	18??−1???	0									
Star of Brunswick			18??	18??−1???	0									
Star of Carlton			1875	1883−1907	1	1884								
Union Jack			18??	18??−1???	0									
Waverley			1883	1883−1???	1	1883								
Werribee			1???	1909−19??	0									
West Melbourne		Westeners	1874	1880s−1908	1	1898	Folded; 1908							
West Richmond		Richmondites		1???−1901	0		Merged; 1902 with Richmond City (now Richmond reserves − VFL)							
Williamstown seconds (Williamstown Juniors)		Seagulls, Town	1864	1885−1???; 192?−1932	4	1885, 1916, 1917, 1919	In recess							
Yarraville		Eagles	1903	1903−1932	7	1905, 1908, 1909, 1912, 1920, 1925, 1926								

== Premiers ==
The premiers of the VJFA from 1883 until the discontinuation of the Wren Shield in 1932 are given below. Premierships between 1928 and 1932 are included, but overlap with the commonly recognised VFA seconds premierships.

GF	Premiership decided by a grand final where a challenge was not needed
GF (R)	Premiership decided by a grand final replay, after the scheduled grand final was drawn
NF	Premiership decided based on the minor premiers, with no grand final required as the ladder leader was at least two wins ahead of the second-placed club
CF	Premiership decided by a challenge final under the Argus system
GF (D)	Premiership decided by a grand final which was contested by the premiers of each division/section (1924−1927)
W/L	Premiership decided by full season win–loss record
GF (C)	Premiership decided by a game that could have been challenged by the runner-up, but wasn't

=== VJFA premiers ===
Year	Premiers	Runners-up	Score	Venue	Date	Report
1883	Waverley (1)					
1884	Star of Carlton (1)					
1885	Williamstown Juniors (1)					
1886	North Park (1)					
1887	North Park (2)					
1888	North Park (3)					
1889	North Park (4)					
1890	North Park (5)					
1891	Marylebone (1)					
1892	North Williamstown (1)					
1893	Napier Imperial (1)					
1894	Fitzroy Juniors (1)					
1895	Albion United (1)					
1896	Albert Park (1)					
1897	Albert Park (2)					
1898	West Melbourne (1)					
1899	Melbourne Juniors (1)					
1900	Preston (1)	Collingwood Juniors	3.3 (21) d. 1.6 (12)	Brunswick Street Oval	15 September 1900	
1901	Preston (2)					
1902	Preston (3)					
1903	South Melbourne Juniors (1)	Collingwood Juniors	6.1 (37) d. 3.9 (27)	Preston City Oval	19 September 1903	
1904	Northcote (1)					
1905	Yarraville (1)	Northcote	2.10 (22) d. 2.9 (21)	Yarraville Oval	16 September 1905	
1906	Northcote (2)	Yarraville	7.7 (49) d. 4.5 (29)	Victoria Park	8 September 1906	
1907	Footscray Juniors (1)	Yarraville	7.4 (46) d. 5.11 (41)	Victoria Park	5 October 1907	
1908	Yarraville (2)	Footscray Juniors	7.11 (53) d. 3.6 (24)	North Melbourne Cricket Ground	26 September 1908	
1909	Yarraville (3)	Footscray Juniors	7.11 (53) d. 3.6 (24)	Richmond City Reserve	3 October 1908	
1910	Port Melbourne Railway United (1)	Yarraville	4.9 (33) d. 1.2 (8)	Croxton Park	22 October 1910	
1911	Fitzroy Juniors (2)	Port Melbourne Railway United	9.10 (64) d. 3.8 (26)	Croxton Park	30 September 1911	
1912	Yarraville (4)	Port Melbourne Railway United	4.6 (30) d. 3.9 (27)	Croxton Park	21 September 1912	
1913	Port Melbourne Railway United (2)	Yarraville	11.9 (75) d. 3.6 (24)	North Melbourne Cricket Ground	20 September 1913	
1914	Port Melbourne Railway United (3)	South Melbourne Districts	11.9 (75) d. 3.6 (24)	North Melbourne Cricket Ground	22 August 1914	
1915	Footscray Juniors (2)	Yarraville	11.9 (75) d. 3.6 (24)	North Melbourne Cricket Ground	25 September 1915	
1916	Williamstown Juniors (2)	Preston	2.9 (21) d. 2.6 (18)	East Melbourne Cricket Ground	14 October 1916	
1917	Williamstown Juniors (3)	Fairfield	11.10 (76) d. 6.8 (44)	East Melbourne Cricket Ground	6 October 1917	
1918	Footscray Juniors (3)	Williamstown Juniors	7.8 (50) d. 3.16 (34)	East Melbourne Cricket Ground	5 October 1918	
1919	Williamstown Juniors (4)	Footscray Juniors	6.6 (42) d. 4.13 (37)	East Melbourne Cricket Ground	18 October 1919	
1920	Yarraville (5)	North Melbourne Football Club	11.18 (84) d. 3.6 (24)	Western Oval	25 September 1920	
1921	Preston (4)	Port Melbourne Railway United	9.8 (62) d. 6.15 (51)	Dandenong	1 October 1921	
1922	North Melbourne Juniors (1)	South Melbourne Districts	10.18 (78) d. 8.8 (56)	Melbourne Cricket Ground	28 September 1922	
1923	Preston (5)	Yarraville	9.15 (69) 7.10 (52)	Richmond Cricket Ground	27 September 1923	
1924	South Melbourne District (2)	Hawthorn Juniors	9.13 (67) d. 4.10 (34)	North Melbourne Cricket Ground	25 September 1924	
1925	Yarraville (6)	Port Melbourne Railway United	10.15 (75) d. 5.10 (40)	Motordrome	3 October 1925	
1926	Yarraville (7)	Port Melbourne Railway United	15.16 (106) d. 11.11 (77)	Motordrome	2 October 1926	
1927	Kingsville (1)	Coburg seconds	8.7 (55) d. 6.6 (42)	Yarraville Oval	1 October 1927	
1928	Coburg seconds (1)	Port Melbourne	4.5 (29) d. 1.9 (15)	Coburg Cricket Ground	15 September 1928	
1929	Coburg seconds (2)	Williamstown seconds	14.16 (100) d. 14.7 (91)	Oakleigh Cricket Ground	28 September 1929	
1930	Coburg seconds (3)	Preston seconds	9.12 (66) d. 6.13 (49)	North Melbourne Recreation Reserve	4 October 1930	
1931	Brunswick seconds (1)	Coburg seconds	12.10 (82) d. 5.14 (44)	Preston City Oval	26 September 1931	
1932	Brunswick seconds (2)	Coburg seconds	13.15 (93) d. 4.13 (37)	Coburg Cricket Ground	1 October 1932	

=== VFA Section premiers ===
From 1924 until the end of the 1927 season, the winner of the Division 2/VFA Section grand final played the Division 1/VJFA Section winner in the overall VJFA grand final.

Year	Premiers	Runners-up	Score	Venue	Date	Report
1924	Hawthorn Juniors (1)	North Melbourne Juniors	5.9 (39) d. 4.5 (29)			
1925	Port Melbourne Railway United (1)					
1926	Port Melbourne Railway United (2)					
1927	Coburg seconds (1)					

=== Wren Shield permanent winners ===
- 1909 – Yarraville (1905, 1908, 1909)
- 1914 – Port Melbourne Railway United (1910, 1913, 1914)
- 1919 – Williamstown Juniors (1916, 1917, 1919)
- 1926 – Yarraville (1920, 1925, 1926)
- 1930 – Coburg seconds (1928, 1929, 1930)

== Notable events ==
- Preston's W. Eades kicked a VJFA record of 21 goals during a 1917 match against Ascot Vale, with Preston winning 32.16 (201) to 2.2 (14). Ascot Vale were three men short with only 14 players on the field.
- Following the end of the 1922 home-and-away season, Kew player C. Coomber was suspended for 12 months (the entire 1923 season) after striking North Melbourne Juniors player A. Gregory.
