= South Ballarat Football Club =

South Ballarat

Names
- Full name: South Ballarat Football Club
- Former name: Albion Imperial

Club details
- Founded: c. 1876
- Dissolved: 1941; 85 years ago
- Colours: Dark blue Red
- Competition: Ballarat Football League
- Premierships: 13 (1883, 1884, 1885, 1886, 1904, 1907, 1909, 1911, 1912, 1913, 1926, 1934, 1938)

Uniforms
Home

The South Ballarat Football Club was an Australian rules football club which formerly competed in the Ballarat Football League.

== History ==
The club was formed in the 1876 as the Albion Imperial Football Club before becoming known as South Ballarat in 1884.

The club was a provincial member of the Victorian Football Association (VFA) from 1883 until 1896, taking part in the Association's administration and competing against Melbourne-based VFA clubs between 1885 and 1888, whilst also competing in the local Ballarat / Western Districts football competition too.

South Ballarat played a match against the touring British footballers in June 1888, winning by seven goals, 18 behinds to three goals, seven behinds.

The club was a founding member of the Ballarat Football Association in 1893. During its time in the competition, it won eight senior premierships, including three in a row between 1911 and 1913.

The club merged with the Sebastopol Football Club in 1940 to form the South Sebastopol Football Club.

The club went into recess during World War II and did not return to competition after the war.

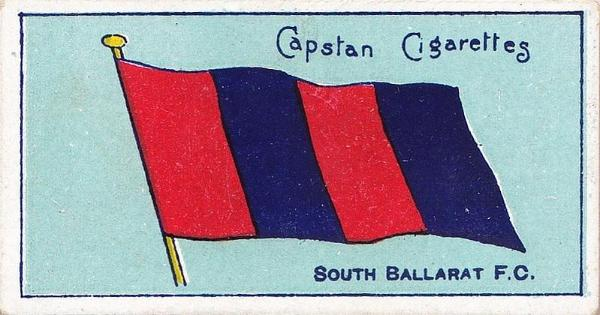
1908 - South Ballarat FC Flag

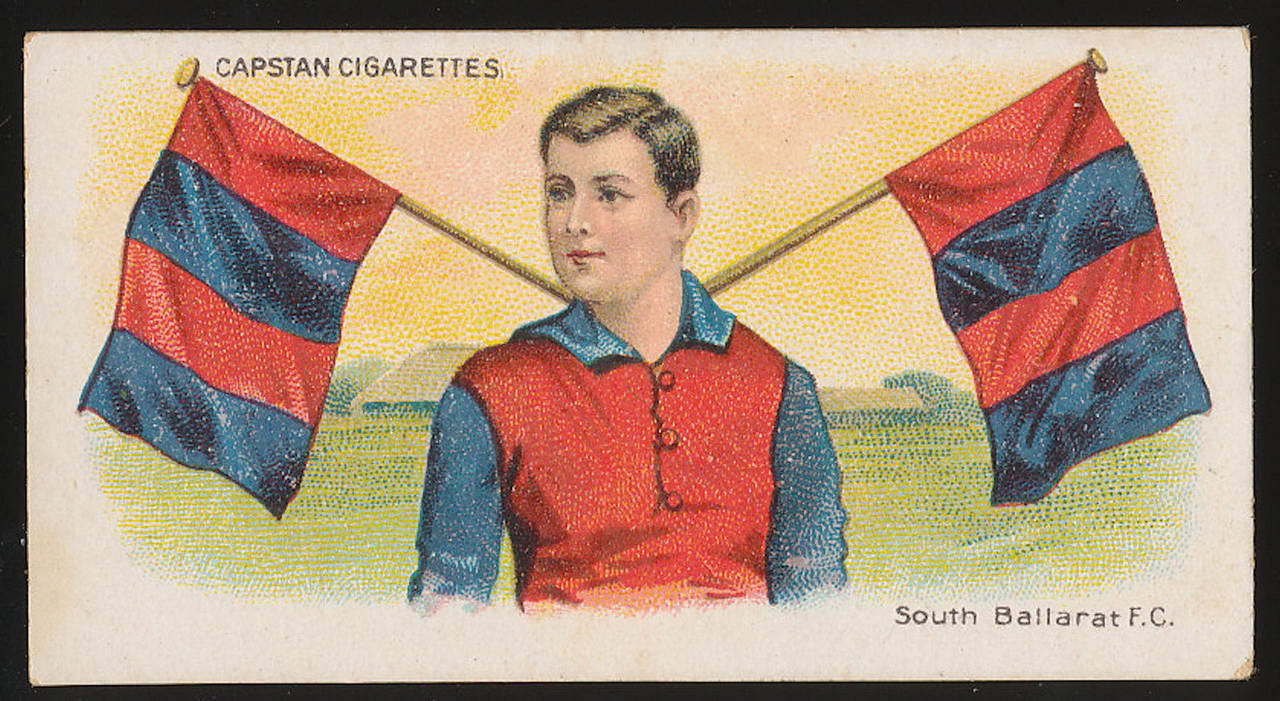
1913 - South Ballarat FC colours

== Premierships ==
- Ballarat / Western Districts Football Competition (4)
  - 1883, 1884, 1885, 1886
- Ballarat Football League (8)
  - 1904, 1907, 1909, 1911, 1912, 1913, 1926, 1938
- Ballarat Wimmera Football League (1)
  - 1934

== Links ==
- 1934 - Ballarat - Wimmera FL Finalists: Horsham FC & South Ballarat FC team photos
