= List of Victorian Football League grounds =

Since its formation in 1877, the Victorian Football League (VFL) – known as the Victorian Football Association (VFA) until the end of 1995 – has played its matches at numerous grounds.

As a second-tier Australian rules football competition, the VFL typically plays its matches at suburban grounds. However, some larger grounds are occasionally used, including for curtain-raisers to Australian Football League (AFL) matches.

This list comprises current and former grounds. It includes grounds where teams have or had agreements in place to play home matches but are/were not full-time tenants of those grounds; in these cases, the club is shown in italics. In some instances, the listed capacity is the venue's record attendance.

== VFA/VFL grounds ==
=== Current ===
The following grounds are being used for the 2026 VFL season.

Ground	Image	Other names	Suburb	State	Capacity	First used	Current tenant(s)
Arden Street Oval		North Melbourne Recreation Reserve	North Melbourne	Vic	4,000	1877	North Melbourne
Bellerive Oval		Ninja Stadium	Bellerive	Tas	19,500	2003	Tasmania
Blacktown ISP Oval			Rooty Hill	NSW	10,000	2021	Sydney
Box Hill City Oval			Box Hill	Vic	10,000	1951	Box Hill
Carrara Stadium		People First Stadium	Carrara	Qld	25,000	2021	Gold Coast
Carrara Training Oval		Austworld Centre Oval	Carrara	Qld	1,000	2021	Gold Coast
Casey Fields Oval 1			Cranbourne East	Vic	9,000	2006	Casey
Chirnside Park		Avalon Airport Oval	Werribee	Vic	8,000	1965	Werribee
Coburg City Oval		Barry Plant Park	Coburg	Vic	10,000	1925	Coburg
Dial Regional Sports Complex		Dial Park	Penguin	Tas	3,000	2026	Tasmania
Docklands Stadium		Marvel Stadium	Docklands	Vic	53,343	2008	
Fankhauser Reserve			Southport	Qld	8,000	2010	Southport
Frankston Park		Kinetic Stadium	Frankston	Vic	5,000	1966	Frankston
Holm Park Recreation Reserve			Beaconsfield	Vic	7,000	2017	Richmond
Kardinia Park		GMHBA Stadium	South Geelong	Vic	40,000	1922	Geelong
Kennedy Community Centre			Dingley Village	Vic	3,000	2026	Box Hill
Moorabbin Oval		RSEA Park	Moorabbin	Vic	8,000	1952	St Kilda
Narrandera Sportsground			Narrandera	NSW	14,000	2026	Greater Western Sydney
North Hobart Oval			North Hobart	Tas	11,135	2001	Tasmania
North Port Oval		ETU Stadium	Port Melbourne	Vic	6,000	1886	Port Melbourne
Olympic Park Oval		KGM Centre	Melbourne	Vic	3,500	2013	Collingwood
Princes Park		Ikon Park	Carlton North	Vic	13,000	1879	Carlton
Punt Road Oval		Swinburne Centre	East Melbourne	Vic	2,800	1879	Richmond
Springfield Central Stadium		Brighton Homes Arena	Springfield	Qld	8,000	2023	Brisbane
Sydney Cricket Ground			Moore Park	NSW	48,000	2021	Sydney
Sydney Showground Stadium		ENGIE Stadium	Sydney Olympic Park	NSW	23,500	2021	Greater Western Sydney
The Hangar		NEC Hangar	Melbourne Airport	Vic	3,500	2022	Essendon
Tom Wills Oval			Sydney Olympic Park	NSW	1,000	2023	Greater Western Sydney
Tony Sheehan Oval		La Trobe University	Bundoora	Vic	2,500	2026	Collingwood
Tramway Oval		Lakeside Oval	Moore Park	NSW	1,000	2021	Sydney
Trevor Barker Beach Oval		Beach Road Oval	Sandringham	Vic	6,000	1894	Sandringham
Victoria Park			Abbotsford	Vic	10,000	1892	Collingwood
Whitten Oval		Mission Whitten Oval; Western Oval	Footscray	Vic	7,000	1886	Footscray
Williamstown Cricket Ground		DSV Stadium	Williamstown	Vic	6,000	1886	Williamstown
Windy Hill		Essendon Recreation Reserve	Essendon	Vic	10,000	1900	Essendon
York Park		UTAS Stadium	Launceston	Tas	15,500	2001	Tasmania

=== Former ===
Ground	Image	Other names	Suburb	State	Capacity	Seasons used		Tenant(s)
Ground	Image	Other names	Suburb	State	Capacity	First	Last	Tenant(s)
Alan Garden Reserve			Swan Hill	Vic		2014	2014	Bendigo
Albert Cricket Ground		Warehouseman's Cricket Ground	St Kilda	Vic	2,000	1886	1893	Prahran
Arch Brown Reserve			Berwick	Vic		1983	1984	Berwick
Ben Kavanagh Reserve		Mordialloc Oval	Mordialloc	Vic	2,500	1958	1987	Mordialloc
Bentleigh Hodgson Reserve		Hodgson Reserve	Bentleigh	Vic	2,000	1985	1987	Moorabbin (II)
Brighton Beach Oval			Brighton	Vic	6,000	1908	1931	Brighton
Brunswick Street Oval		Fitzroy Cricket Ground	Fitzroy North	Vic	10,000	1883	1921	Fitzroy
Camberwell Sports Ground		McQueen Financial Group Park	Camberwell	Vic	5,000	1926	1990	Camberwell
Cazalys Stadium			Westcourt	Qld	13,500	2010	2010	Gold Coast
Central Reserve			Glen Waverley	Vic	6,000	1961	1986	Waverley
Cheltenham Recreation Reserve		Jack Barker Oval	Cheltenham	Vic	4,500	1951	1951	Moorabbin (I)
Cooke Murphy Oval			Labrador	Qld	8,000	2010	2010	Gold Coast
Corio Oval			Geelong	Vic	26,000	1878	1896	Geelong
Croxton Park			Northcote	Vic	3,500	1909	1914	Northcote
Dandenong Showgrounds			Dandenong	Vic	6,500	1958	1968	Dandenong
Deakin University Elite Sports Precinct			Waurn Ponds	Vic	10,000	2024	2025	Geelong (practice matches)
East Melbourne Cricket Ground			East Melbourne	Vic	22,500	1878	1921	East Melbourne; Melbourne City
Eastern Oval		Ballarat Cricket Ground	Ballarat	Vic	8,000	1886	1897	South Ballarat
Elsternwick Park			Brighton	Vic	6,000	1927	1961	Brighton
Eureka Stadium			Wendouree	Vic	11,000	1996	2017 (Note: Remained in use for practice matches as recently as 2025.)	North Ballarat
Friendly Societies' Ground			Melbourne	Vic	7,500	1885	1891	Melbourne
Garden's Reserve		Fearon Reserve	Williamstown	Vic	5,000	1877	1887	Williamstown
Graham Road Oval			Carseldine	Qld	3,000	2021	2021	Aspley
Gillon Oval		Brunswick Park	Brunswick	Vic	17,000	1902	1991	Brunswick/Brunswick-Broadmeadows
Glenferrie Oval			Hawthorn	Vic	10,000	1914	1924	Hawthorn
Highgate Recreation Reserve		RAMS Arena	Craigieburn	Vic	5,000	2010	2024	Coburg
Junction Oval		St Kilda Cricket Ground	St Kilda	Vic	7,000	1886	1987	Moorabbin (I); St Kilda
Kilsyth Recreation Reserve			Kilsyth	Vic		1982	1984	Kilsyth
Lake Oval		South Melbourne Cricket Ground	Albert Park	Vic	10,000	1877	1958	Albert Park; South Melbourne
Lavington Sports Ground			Hamilton Valley	NSW	12,000	2000	2002	Murray Kangaroos
Manuka Oval			Griffith	ACT	15,000	2023	2024	Greater Western Sydney
Manuka Road Oval		Berwick Recreation Reserve	Berwick	Vic		1985	1987	Berwick
McCracken's Paddock		Glass's Paddock; Flemington Hill	Ascot Vale	Vic	1,500	1877	1884	Essendon
McKinnon Reserve		McKinnon Recreation Reserve	McKinnon	Vic		1984	1984	Moorabbin (II)
Melbourne Cricket Ground			East Melbourne	Vic	100,024	1877	2024	
Melbourne Showgrounds			Ascot Vale	Vic	2,300	1934	1934	
Moreton Bay Central Sports Complex			Burpengary	Qld	13,500	2021	2022	Brisbane
Motordrome		Olympic Park	Melbourne	Vic	15,000	1925	1939	
Norm Minns Oval		Wangaratta Showgrounds	Northcote	Vic	15,000	2017	2017	Werribee
Northcote Park		Bill Lawry Oval; Westgarth Street Oval	Northcote	Vic	15,000	1880	1987	Northcote
Olympic Park No. 2		Eastern Sportsground	Melbourne	Vic	6,000	1945	1945	Port Melbourne
Park Street Oval		Royal Park	Parkville	Vic		1897	1907 (Note: Remained in use for practice matches in 1908.)	Brunswick
Preston City Oval		Cramer Street Oval	Preston	Vic	5,000	1903	2025	Preston
Princes Park			Caulfield South	Vic	3,500	1962	1987	Brighton-Caulfield; Caulfield
Queen Elizabeth Oval			Bendigo	Vic	10,000	1998	2014	Bendigo
Richmond City Reserve		Citizens Park	Richmond	Vic	500	1896	1897	Richmond
RMIT Oval			Bundoora	Vic	1,000	2023	2025	Northern Bullants (practice matches)
Robertson Oval			Wagga Wagga	NSW	9,000	1953	1953	
Shepley Oval			Dandenong	Vic	4,000	1962	2004	Dandenong; Springvale
Skinner Reserve			Braybrook	Vic	5,000	1966	1989 (Note: Remained in use for practice matches as recently as 2023.)	Sunshine
South Pine Sports Complex			Brendale	Qld	3,000	2021	2022	Brisbane
Spring Creek Reserve			Torquay	Vic	2,000	2017	2017	Werribee
Springvale Reserve		Newcomen Road Oval	Springvale	Vic	6,000	1982	2005	Springvale
The Gabba			Woolloongabba	Qld	37,478	2021	2024	Brisbane
Toomuc Recreation Reserve		Toomuc Reserve	Pakenham	Vic		1999	1999	Springvale
Toorak Park			Armadale	Vic	5,000	1880	1994	Prahran
Traralgon Recreation Reserve		Traralgon Reserve	Traralgon	Vic	5,000	1996	1997	Traralgon
University Oval			Parkville	Vic	1,000	1885	1896	University
Victoria Park			Echuca	Vic	500	2014	2014	Bendigo
Warrawee Park		Oakleigh Football Ground	Oakleigh	Vic	12,000	1929	1994	Oakleigh
Waverley Park		VFL Park	Mulgrave	Vic	72,000	1987	2000	Springvale; Waverley
Wesley College Ground			Melbourne	Vic	1,500	1887	1887	Prahran
West Oval		Geelong West Oval; Western Oval	North Geelong	Vic	12,000	1926	1988	Geelong (A); Geelong West
Wonthaggi Recreation Reserve			Wonthaggi	Vic	5,000	2023	2025	Box Hill
Yarraville Oval			Yarraville	Vic	6,000	1879	1982	Yarraville

== VFL Women's grounds ==
=== Current ===
The following grounds are being used for the 2026 VFL Women's season.

Ground	Image	Other names	Suburb	State	Capacity	First used	Current tenant(s)
Arden Street Oval		North Melbourne Recreation Reserve	North Melbourne	Vic	4,000	2019	North Melbourne Werribee
Box Hill City Oval			Box Hill	Vic	10,000	2017	Box Hill
Casey Fields Oval 1			Cranbourne East	Vic	9,000	2016	Casey
Chirnside Park		Avalon Airport Oval	Werribee	Vic	8,000	2025	North Melbourne Werribee
Dial Regional Sports Complex		Dial Park	Penguin	Tas	3,000	2026	Tasmania
North Hobart Oval			North Hobart	Tas	11,135	2026	Tasmania
North Port Oval		ETU Stadium	Port Melbourne	Vic	6,000	2018	Port Melbourne
Olympic Park Oval		KGM Centre	Melbourne	Vic	3,500	2018	Collingwood
Preston City Oval		Cramer Street Oval	Preston	Vic	5,000	2016	Darebin
Princes Park		Ikon Park	Carlton North	Vic	13,000	2017	Carlton
The Hangar		NEC Hangar	Melbourne Airport	Vic	3,500	2021	Essendon
Tony Sheehan Oval		La Trobe University	Bundoora	Vic	2,500	2019	Darebin
Trevor Barker Beach Oval		Beach Road Oval	Sandringham	Vic	6,000	2018	Sandringham
Victoria Park			Abbotsford	Vic	10,000	2018	Collingwood
Whitten Oval		Mission Whitten Oval; Western Oval	Footscray	Vic	7,000	2016	Western Bulldogs
Williamstown Cricket Ground		DSV Stadium	Williamstown	Vic	6,000	2016	Williamstown
Windy Hill		Essendon Recreation Reserve	Essendon	Vic	10,000	2018	Essendon
York Park		UTAS Stadium	Launceston	Tas	15,500	2026	Tasmania

=== Former ===
Ground	Image	Other names	Suburb	State	Capacity	Seasons used		Tenant(s)
Ground	Image	Other names	Suburb	State	Capacity	First	Last	Tenant(s)
Anthony Costa Oval		Kardinia Park West; St Mary's Oval	South Geelong	Vic		2017	2017	Geelong Cats
University Oval			Parkville	Vic	1,000	2016	2017	Melbourne University

== Attendance records ==
Many attendance records are higher than the present-day capacity of grounds because of redevelopments or modern safety regulations that have reduced the maxiumum capacity.

Ground	Crowd	Game	Date	Ref
Albert Cricket Ground	800	Melbourne vs Essendon (Round 8, 1891 season)	20 June 1891	
Bellerive Oval	14,122	Tasmania vs Carlton (Round 5, 2026 season)	25 April 2026	
Docklands Stadium	23,816	Footscray vs Box Hill (2014 grand final)	21 September 2014	
Preston City Oval	15,000	Preston vs Northcote (Round 1, 1930 season)	26 April 1930	
Preston City Oval	15,000	Preston vs Oakleigh (Round 7, 1930 season)	9 June 1930	
Preston City Oval	15,000	Preston vs Williamstown (Round 15, 1940 season)	3 August 1940	

== See also ==
- List of Australian Football League grounds
