= McLatchie =

McLatchie is a surname. Notable people with the surname include:

- Colin McLatchie (c. 1878–1952), Scottish footballer
- Greg McLatchie (fl. 2000), British surgeon
- Stewart McLatchie (1896–1968), Australian rules footballer
