= Fred O'Shea =

Australian rules footballer

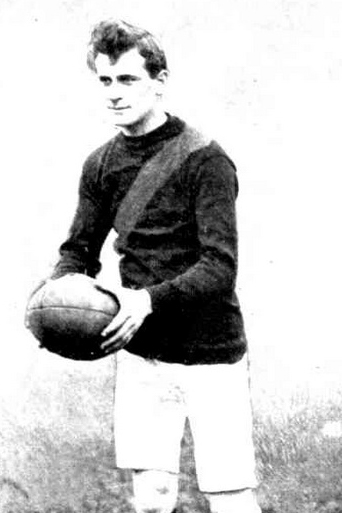
- O'Shea in 1910

Personal information
- Full name: Thomas Frederick O'Shea
- Born: 5 October 1886; Seymour, Victoria
- Died: 21 December 1962 (aged 76); Brunswick, Victoria
- Original team: Brunswick
- Height: 170 cm (5 ft 7 in)
- Weight: 68 kg (150 lb)
- Position: Wingman

Playing career^{1}
Years	Club	Games (Goals)
1907–09	Brunswick	36 (17)
1910–12	Essendon	49 (3)
- ^{1} Playing statistics correct to the end of 1912.

Thomas Frederick O'Shea (5 October 1886 – 21 December 1962) was an Australian rules footballer who played for Essendon in the Victorian Football League (VFL).

== Family ==
The son of John O'Shea, and Elizabeth O'Shea, née Myers, Thomas Frederick O'Shea was born at Seymour, Victoria on 5 October 1886.

== Football ==
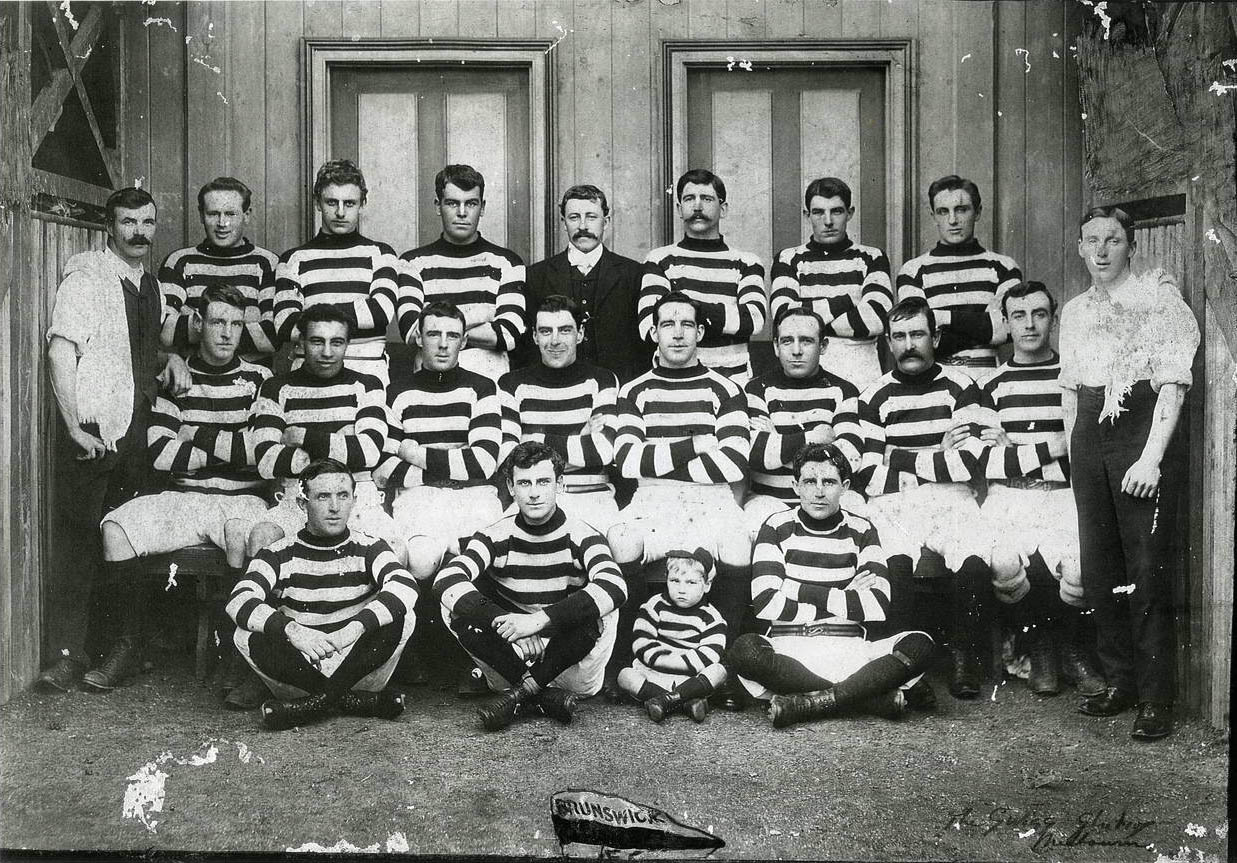
The Brunswick 1909 Premiership team. Fred O'Shea is at the centre of the front row

=== Brunswick (VFA) ===
He played 36 games and scored 17 goals for Brunswick, over three seasons (1907 to 1909).

O'Shea was a member of the 1909 Brunswick VFA premiership team, kicking two goals in the Grand Final against Prahran on 25 September 1909.

=== Essendon (VFL) ===
Cleared from Brunswick on 29 April 1910, he joined Essendon in 1910; and played on the wing in the Essendon team that won the 1911 Grand Final.

==== 1912 VFL Preliminary Final ====
On 21 September 1912, O'Shea kicked the winning goal in the Preliminary Final against Carlton (his goal put Essendon into the Grand Final against South Melbourne, which Essendon won).

"Reputed to be the League's top wingman during his period with Essendon" (Maplestone, 1996, p. 86) O'Shea had badly injured his knee in the first quarter, when he had been bumped in the air when contesting a mark, and had fallen awkwardly to the ground, wrenching his knee. He had to be carried off the ground. He returned to the field almost immediately, but did not stay long:

"O'Shea now limped out [onto the field], and went in front of goal, but was overwhelmed in a wild surge, and had to be carried off once again".

Displaying great courage, he returned to the field in the second half; restricted to the goal-square (he was unable to walk) he kicked the match-winning goal for Essendon, with his only kick:

"O'Shea, who went out [once again] at half-time on the off-chance of doing something for his side – but in the main to keeping a man away from where be would be doing the most harm – marked the ball a few yards in front, and, nerving himself for the ordeal, he punted it through, and the game seemed safe".

Many years later, the 1912 Essendon Coach, Jack Worrall spoke of the incident with great admiration for O'Shea's strong team-spirit, and exceptional courage:

"One final in particular I will never forget Essendon was playing Carlton, there being no 19th man in those days. A minute after play began, Fred [O'Shea], Essendon's talented flanker, was carried off the field owing to an injured leg, and Essendon was in sore straits.
I have never been a believer in playing injured men, and set my face against [O'Shea's] reappearance after half-time. Like all footballers of mettle [O'Shea] was anxious to reappear, feeling that he had let his side down. It was left for me to decide and I reluctantly agreed upon his re-entry on the distinct understanding that he was not to move away from the goal-mouth.
It was not that anything was expected of him but that his mere presence on the field would prevent our opponents from having a loose man.
In the dying moment Ernie Cameron broke his leg, and as the game hung in the balance it appeared as if Essendon was doomed. Cameron was a champion expert in any position though it was a rover that he stood head and shoulders above his confreres. As he was helpless on the ground he exhorted his comrades to see it out and leave him alone, and his advice acted like a tonic as his mates made one despairing effort for victory.
In the stress the Carlton full-back left his post, being sick to death of minding a wounded man, and at the psychological moment the ball was marked by [O'Shea] on his own a few yards in front. He steadied himself, gave pressure on his wounded leg to see whether it would stand the strain, kicked the ball, staggered and fell.
The bell rang and Essendon won the day by a few points. It was his only kick in the match and it won the premiership. Injured and all, he felt he had redeemed himself. Neither Cameron nor [O'Shea] ever played again."

Due to his injury – he was on crutches for three weeks – he could not play in the Grand Final. At the Essendon Football Club's Smoke Night on 11 December 1912,

"There was great deal of enthusiasm, especially when players who were injured [in the 1912] season were honoured. E. Cameron, who broke his leg in the final match, was presented with a cheque for £200 and a gold watch; W.Busbridge [injured on 13 July 1912] was handed a cheque for £150 and a gold watch; and F. O'Shea was handed a cheque, the amount of which was not disclosed."

In 1913, he returned to Brunswick.

== Death ==
Thomas Frederick O'Shea died on 21 December 1962, and is buried at Melbourne General Cemetery.
