= 1925 VFA season =

1925 VFA premiership season
- Teams: 8
- Premiers: Brunswick; 2nd premiership
- Minor premiers: Brunswick; 1st minor premiership

Attendance
- Matches played: 59
- Total attendance: 465,500 (7,890 per match)

The 1925 Victorian Football Association season was the 47th season of the Australian rules football competition. The premiership was won by the Brunswick Football Club, after it defeated Port Melbourne by 16 points in the final on 31 August. It was the club's second VFA premiership.

== Association membership ==
During the 1924/25 offseason, the Victorian Football League looked towards the expansion of its numbers, as well as securing the new and strategically valuable Motordrome as a regular venue. While several Association clubs were keen to be admitted to the League, the 1923 agreement between the two bodies regarding player transfers effectively prevented any clubs from changing competition.

The Association received applications from Camberwell, Coburg, Yarraville, and Public Service for admission in 1925. In December 1924, it decided to admit Coburg and to provisionally admit Public Service if it could secure a suitable playing ground, which it ultimately could not. However, by admitting new clubs, the League contended that the Association was no longer the same body which signed the player transfers agreement in 1923; the League now considered the agreement broken, and admitted Footscray, Hawthorn and North Melbourne to its senior ranks. The Association considered a legal challenge, but decided against it. The League also obtained the permission of the Minister for Lands to admit North Melbourne and allow it to use the North Melbourne Recreation Reserve, reversing a decision the Minister had made in 1921 that the venue should be reserved for Association use.

The changes left the Association without three of its strongest clubs: on-field, Footscray and North Melbourne had between them won every minor premiership since 1912, and won fifteen of the twenty-six premierships since the breakaway of the League in 1897; off-field, the clubs were amongst the richest. The League stated on the record that it wanted to poach three strong clubs, rather than just one, to weaken the Association as much as possible, as it was concerned that with 'the agreement' broken, a strong Association would be in the position to recruit heavily from League clubs – as had occurred in the early 1920s before 'the agreement' was in place. Many Association delegates believed that Footscray's victory against League premiers Essendon in the previous year's end-of-season playoff charity match had contributed significantly to the League's fears and motivated its actions.

Melbourne Carnivals Ltd, which owned the Motordrome, was keen to stage top level football on its venue. At one stage, it considered an ambitious scheme to install floodlights and stage night matches at the Motordrome, to establish three new clubs into the Association – Public Service, Melbourne City and Richmond City – as well as admitting Coburg and Camberwell, and to bankroll enormous wages of £5 per week to lure the best players away from the League, in an attempt to make the Association the dominant football competition in the state. Nothing ever came of the scheme; but, fifty years later, a very similar set of circumstances played out when World Series Cricket changed the landscape of world cricket.

The Association secured the Motordrome as its finals venue, having lost the North Melbourne Recreation Reserve in the League's expansion. As a result of the changes, the size of the Association was reduced to eight clubs.

== Premiership ==
The home-and-home season was played over only fourteen rounds, compared with the eighteen matches that previous seasons had been played over, with each club playing the others twice; then, the top four clubs contested a finals series under the amended Argus system to determine the premiers for the season.

=== Ladder ===
1925 VFA ladder
Pos	Team	Pld	W	L	D	PF	PA	PP	Pts
1	Brunswick (P)	14	12	2	0	1138	704	61.9	48
2	Northcote	14	11	3	0	1108	870	78.5	44
3	Coburg	14	10	4	0	1061	850	80.1	40
4	Port Melbourne	14	8	6	0	1017	855	84.1	32
5	Brighton	14	7	7	0	930	890	95.7	28
6	Williamstown	14	4	10	0	702	929	132.3	12 (Note: 4 points deducted)
7	Prahran	14	3	11	0	803	1091	135.9	12
8	Geelong	14	1	13	0	691	1161	168.0	4

Rules for classification: 1) points; 2) percentage; 3) number of points for.
(P) Premiers

=== Finals ===
	Semifinals
Saturday, 8 August	Northcote 9.12 (66)	def. by	Port Melbourne 14.12 (96)	Motordrome (crowd: 7,500)
Saturday, 15 August	Brunswick 6.18 (54)	def.	Coburg 7.9 (51)	Motordrome (crowd: 17,300)

1925 VFA Final
Saturday, 29 August	Brunswick	def.	Port Melbourne	Motordrome (crowd: 15,000)
1.3 (9); 7.5 (47); 8.8 (56); 10.9 (69)	Q1; Q2; Q3; Final	4.1 (25); 5.3 (33); 6.7 (43); 7.11 (53)	Umpires: Leheny
Hassett 4, McInerney 3, Fitzgerald, McLatchie, O'Connor	Goals	Froud 2, Lawson 2, Rees 2, Rudd
The match was originally scheduled for Saturday 22 August, but was postponed by one week due to heavy rain on the Friday and Saturday.; Had Port Melbourne won, minor premiers Brunswick would have been entitled to a rematch the following Saturday to decide the premiership.

== Notable events ==
- Tommy Downs (Northcote) won the Woodham Cup as the best and fairest player in the Association. Downs polled five votes, finishing ahead of Elston (Geelong) who polled four votes; seven players tied for third.
- Leo McInerney (Brunswick) was the Association's leading goalscorer for the year, finishing with 75 goals in the home-and-home season, and 79 goals overall.

== See also ==
- List of VFA premiers
