= 1926 VFA season =

48th season of the Victorian Football Association

Overview
- Teams: 10
- Premiers: Coburg; 1st premiership
- Minor premiers: Coburg; 1st minor premiership

The 1926 VFA season was the 48th season of the Victorian Football Association, an Australian rules football competition played in the state of Victoria. The premiership was won by the Coburg Football Club, after it defeated Brighton by 16 points in the final on 18 September. It was the club's first VFA premiership, achieved in only its second season of senior competition.

For the second time in six seasons, the association was disrupted by the mid-season withdrawal of one of its clubs: Brunswick withdrawing after sixteen rounds in protest at suspensions given to two of its players.

== Association membership ==
After having been reduced from ten clubs to eight in 1925, the association sought to admit two clubs into its senior ranks to return to ten. In January 1925, the association decided to admit Camberwell from the Sub-district Association and Preston from the Victorian Junior Football Association. Camberwell had been one of the leading sub-district clubs for years, and had previously applied to join the association on several occasions.

The town of Preston had previously been represented in the association from 1903 until 1911 by a senior Preston Football Club, but this club had ceased to exist de jure, having amalgamated with Northcote prior to 1912. During the same time period, there was a separate junior-level Preston Football Club (once known as Preston Districts) competing in the Victorian Junior Football Association, and it was this Preston club which was now being admitted to the association. However, when Northcote and the former Preston amalgamated, much of Preston's personnel and assets – including its trophies and pennants – were transferred to the junior club, providing a continuity between the two senior Preston clubs. As such, the Preston club admitted to the association in 1926 was considered a de facto continuation of the previous club.

Geelong was struggling off-field, and moved from its original home of Kardinia Park to the West Geelong ground to seek greater support. It had almost folded at the administrative level during the 1925 season, with the proposal at the time being that a new administration take over and continue to field the same team under a different identity, but this did not occur.

The Victorian Junior Football Association, which had been affiliated with the V.F.A. since 1924, took a step towards becoming a dedicated seconds competition for the V.F.A. in 1926 through a re-alignment of its divisions. Under the realignment: the "V.F.A. section" of the V.J.F.A. consisted solely of junior clubs which were effectively seconds teams for the V.F.A. senior clubs (except Geelong); and the "V.J.F.A. section" consisted solely of stand-alone junior clubs with no V.F.A. connection. The transition was ultimately completed in 1928 when the "V.J.F.A. section" was abolished.

=== Withdrawal of Brunswick ===
Following a match against Northcote on 3 July, Brunswick captain Wally Raleigh and teammate T. Hassett reported to the club secretary that a boundary umpire had used abusive language towards them during the match. It took almost two months to resolve the charges, and on 18 August, the association found the boundary umpire not guilty; and, it found Raleigh and Hassett guilty of having made a false charge against the boundary umpire, and deregistered both players until 31 May 1927. At a special meeting on 20 August, the committee and members of the Brunswick Football Club decided to withdraw the club immediately from the association in protest at the suspensions. Its final two matches for the year, against Camberwell on 21 August and against Preston on 28 August, were awarded to its opponents by forfeit, and Brunswick was expelled from the association as punishment.

Several clubs submitted applications to replace Brunswick in the association, including Carnegie, Kew, Werribee and Yarraville. The Brunswick Council, keen to see football played on the venue which it had spent significant money to upgrade, applied for the re-admission of Brunswick to the association on the club's behalf. The association advised that it was in favour of re-admitting Brunswick, provided an entirely new committee be appointed; and, in January 1927, after the former committee resigned, Brunswick was formally re-admitted. Brunswick had requested that Raleigh and Hassett be permitted to appeal their suspensions, but the association rejected this request; Raleigh retired, and Hassett left to coach in Dimboola.

== Ladder ==
The home-and-away season was played over eighteen rounds, with each club playing the others twice; then, the top four clubs contested a finals series under the amended Argus system to determine the premiers for the season.

| Pos | Team | Pld | W | L | D | PF | PA | PP | Pts |
|---|---|---|---|---|---|---|---|---|---|
| 1 | Coburg (P) | 18 | 15 | 3 | 0 | 1777 | 1036 | 58.3 | 60 |
| 2 | Northcote | 18 | 14 | 4 | 0 | 1221 | 1054 | 86.3 | 56 |
| 3 | Port Melbourne | 18 | 13 | 5 | 0 | 1445 | 1037 | 71.8 | 52 |
| 4 | Brighton | 18 | 12 | 6 | 0 | 1432 | 1309 | 91.4 | 48 |
| 5 | Brunswick | 16 | 9 | 7 | 0 | 1007 | 981 | 97.4 | 36 |
| 6 | Preston | 17 | 8 | 9 | 0 | 1305 | 1326 | 101.6 | 36 (Note: Following Brunswick's withdrawal, Brunswick forfeited two remaining matches, and Preston and Camberwell were awarded an additional 4 points each for winning the forfeited matches.) |
| 7 | Prahran | 18 | 6 | 12 | 0 | 1330 | 1477 | 111.1 | 24 |
| 8 | Geelong | 18 | 4 | 14 | 0 | 1007 | 1330 | 132.1 | 16 |
| 9 | Camberwell | 17 | 3 | 14 | 0 | 1046 | 1411 | 134.9 | 16 |
| 10 | Williamstown | 18 | 4 | 14 | 0 | 916 | 1535 | 167.6 | 16 |

Rules for classification: 1) points; 2) percentage; 3) number of points for.
(P) Premiers

== Finals ==
=== Semi-finals ===
| | Semi-finals |
| Saturday, 4 September | Northcote 6.6 (42) | def. by | Brighton 8.6 (54) | Motordrome (crowd: 10,000) |
| Saturday, 11 September | Coburg 9.14 (68) | def. | Port Melbourne 5.11 (41) | Motordrome (crowd: 12,500) |

=== Final ===
1926 VFA Final
Saturday, 18 September | Coburg | def. | Brighton | Motordrome (crowd: 15,000)
5.3 (33); 6.3 (39); 10.7 (67); 12.9 (81) | Q1; Q2; Q3; Final | 2.2 (14); 6.4 (40); 7.6 (48); 9.11 (65)
Gardiner 4, Harris 2, Huntington 2, Kerley 2, Plant 2 | Goals | Walsh 5, Boyd, Carroll, Hunt, Rattray
Injuries | Hunt (fractured skull, concussion)
Had Brighton won, minor premiers Coburg would have been entitled to a rematch the following Saturday to decide the premiership.

== Awards ==
- Jim Walsh (Brighton) was the association's leading goalkicker, with 81 goals in the home-and-home season, and 91 goals overall.
- William Summers (Preston) won the Recorder Cup as the association's best and fairest.
