= Wally Raleigh =

Australian rules footballer (1894–1960)

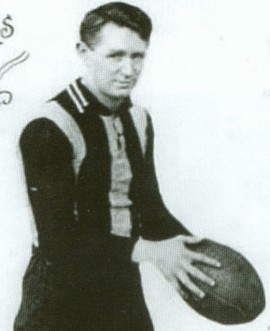

Personal information
- Full name: Timothy Walter Raleigh
- Born: 1 July 1895; Geelong, Victoria
- Died: 16 October 1960 (aged 65); Melbourne, Victoria
- Original team: Fitzroy Juniors
- Height: 177 cm (5 ft 10 in)
- Weight: 76 kg (168 lb)

Playing career^{1}
Years	Club	Games (Goals)
1913–1915	Collingwood	6 (0)
1920–1921	Carlton	32 (0)
Total		38 (0)
- ^{1} Playing statistics correct to the end of 1921.

Timothy Walter Raleigh (1 July 1895 – 16 October 1960) was an Australian rules footballer who played with Collingwood and Carlton in the Victorian Football League (VFL) and Brunswick in the Victorian Football Association.

Raleigh only managed to play six times during his three seasons at Collingwood and after the war crossed to Carlton. In contrast to his stint with Collingwood, Raleigh barely missed a game for Carlton and played in five finals. The last of those was the narrow loss to Richmond in the 1921 VFL Grand Final, which he played from a half back flank.

After leaving Carlton, Raleigh went to Brunswick in the VFA. He became captain-coach of the team, and led it to the 1925 VFA premiership.

In a 1926 match against Northcote, Raleigh and teammate Hassett reported to the club secretary that a boundary umpire had used abusive language towards them during the match. The Association found the boundary umpire not guilty; and, it found Raleigh and Hassett guilty of having made a false charge against the boundary umpire, and deregistered both players until 31 May 1927. The club was so incensed by the outcome that it decided to withdraw from the Association immediately. The club was ultimately readmitted to the VFA prior to the following season under a new committee, but Raleigh retired before his suspension was finished.
