= Bill Busbridge =

Australian rules footballer (1885–1943)

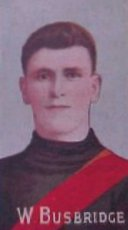

Personal information
- Full name: William Ethelbert Busbridge
- Born: 31 January 1885; Essendon, Victoria
- Died: 12 June 1943 (aged 58); Geelong, Victoria
- Original team: Essendon Town (VFA)
- Height: 183 cm (6 ft 0 in)
- Weight: 83 kg (183 lb)

Playing career^{1}
Years	Club	Games (Goals)
1904–1912	Essendon	103 (32)
- ^{1} Playing statistics correct to the end of 1912.

William Ethelbert Busbridge (31 January 1885 – 12 June 1943) was an Australian rules footballer who played with Essendon in the early days of the Victorian Football League (VFL). A centre half back and part-time ruckman, he was also known by his nickname "Buzzy".

== Family ==
One of seven children (one of whom was Norm Busbridge), Busbridge was born to William Ethebert Busbridge (1861–1937) and Margaret Jane Busbridge (1870–1895), née Smith, in the Essendon district on 31 January 1885.

He married Ethel Essendon Dean (1888–1971) on 14 December 1912. They had one surviving son, Keith Ethelbert (1917–1985).

Busbridge died in a Geelong private hospital on 12 June 1943, and was cremated at Fawkner Crematorium on 14 June 1943.

== Football ==
=== Essendon Town (VFA) ===
Debuting at the age of 17, he played for the VFA team Essendon Town in 1902 and 1903 (31 games and 16 goals).

=== Essendon (VFL) ===
Sought by Carlton, South Melbourne, and Essendon, and refused a clearance by Essendon Town ("in view of the club's good prospects, and the fine form shown by you, it is not in the best interests of the club that you be given a clearance"), he was cleared to play with Essendon at the 4 May 1904 meeting of the VFL Permit Committee. Busbridge went on to win consecutive Best and Fairests in 1908 and 1909. He was a premiership player with the Essendon in 1911 when they beat Collingwood by a single goal.

=== Victoria (inter-State team) ===
He represented Victoria in the inaugural Australasian Football championships in Melbourne, in August 1908.

=== Injury ===
His career came to a premature end when a knee injury forced him to retire in July 1912.

=== Geelong Grammar School ===
In 1913, he was coaching the Geelong Grammar School's First XVIII.

=== Geelong (VFA) ===
As an interim measure, he was appointed coach of the Geelong Association Football Club for the 1925 season. Ex-Fitzroy footballer, and former Geelong (VFL) coach, Bert Taylor, was appointed captain-coach for the 1926 season.

== Renown ==
=== VFL Champion ===
In September 1909 The Argus newspaper organised a vote by its readers to see who were regarded as the most popular champion players in the VFL and VFA. Over 105,000 votes were cast. Busbridge won the League vote (16,592 votes in a total of 64,801) from South Melbourne's Charlie Ricketts (15,232 votes) — a former Essendon team-mate of Busbridge, playing with Brunswick Football Club, Jack McKenzie won the Association vote (17,884 votes in a total of 40,331) from former Geelong footballer Ike Woods, playing with Prahran Football Club (10,317 votes).

=== Champions of Essendon ===
In 2002 an Essendon panel ranked him at 14 in their Champions of Essendon list of the 25 greatest players ever to have played for Essendon.

== See also ==
- 1908 Melbourne Carnival

== Citations ==
- Maplestone, M., Flying Higher: History of the Essendon Football Club 1872–1996, Essendon Football Club, (Melbourne), 1996. ISBN 0-9591740-2-8
- Ross, J. (ed), 100 Years of Australian Football 1897–1996: The Complete Story of the AFL, All the Big Stories, All the Great Pictures, All the Champions, Every AFL Season Reported, Viking, (Ringwood), 1996. ISBN 0-670-86814-0
