= Ray Ellis (Australian footballer) =

Australian rules footballer (1897–1955)

Personal information
- Full name: Raymond Cyril Ellis
- Born: 12 May 1897; Mount Duneed, Victoria
- Died: 22 October 1955 (aged 58); Melbourne, Victoria
- Original team: Geelong Association / Barwon

Playing career^{1}
Years	Club	Games (Goals)
1923	Geelong	2 (0)
- ^{1} Playing statistics correct to the end of 1923.

Raymond Cyril Ellis (12 May 1897 – 22 October 1955) was an Australian rules footballer who played with Geelong in the Victorian Football League (VFL).
