= Elton Plummer =

Australian rules footballer, born 1914

Personal information
- Full name: Elton Wilfrid Plummer
- Born: 31 July 1914; Devonport, Tasmania
- Died: 30 May 1988 (aged 73); Parkville, Victoria
- Original team: Preston (VFA)
- Height: 175 cm (5 ft 9 in)
- Weight: 72 kg (159 lb)

Playing career^{1}
Years	Club	Games (Goals)
1934–1944	Essendon	141 (1)

Coaching career
Years	Club	Games (W–L–D)
1944	Essendon	7 (3–3–1)
- ^{1} Playing statistics correct to the end of 1944.

Elton Wilfrid 'Duffy' Plummer (31 July 1914 – 30 May 1988) was an Australian rules footballer who played with Essendon in the VFL during the 1930s and 1940s.

Plummer was the younger brother of Essendon player Harry Plummer.

Essendon recruited Plummer, a back pocket specialist, from Preston. At one stage he played 98 consecutive games and was a member of Essendon's 1942 premiership team. He also played in their losing Grand Finals of 1941 and 1943. Plummer kicked just one goal in his career, against Collingwood at Victoria Park. In 1944, his final season, he coached Essendon for seven games with regular coach Dick Reynolds suffering from appendicitis and they won three of them. He continued his coaching career at Brunswick in 1945.
