= 1909 VFA season =

1909 premiership season
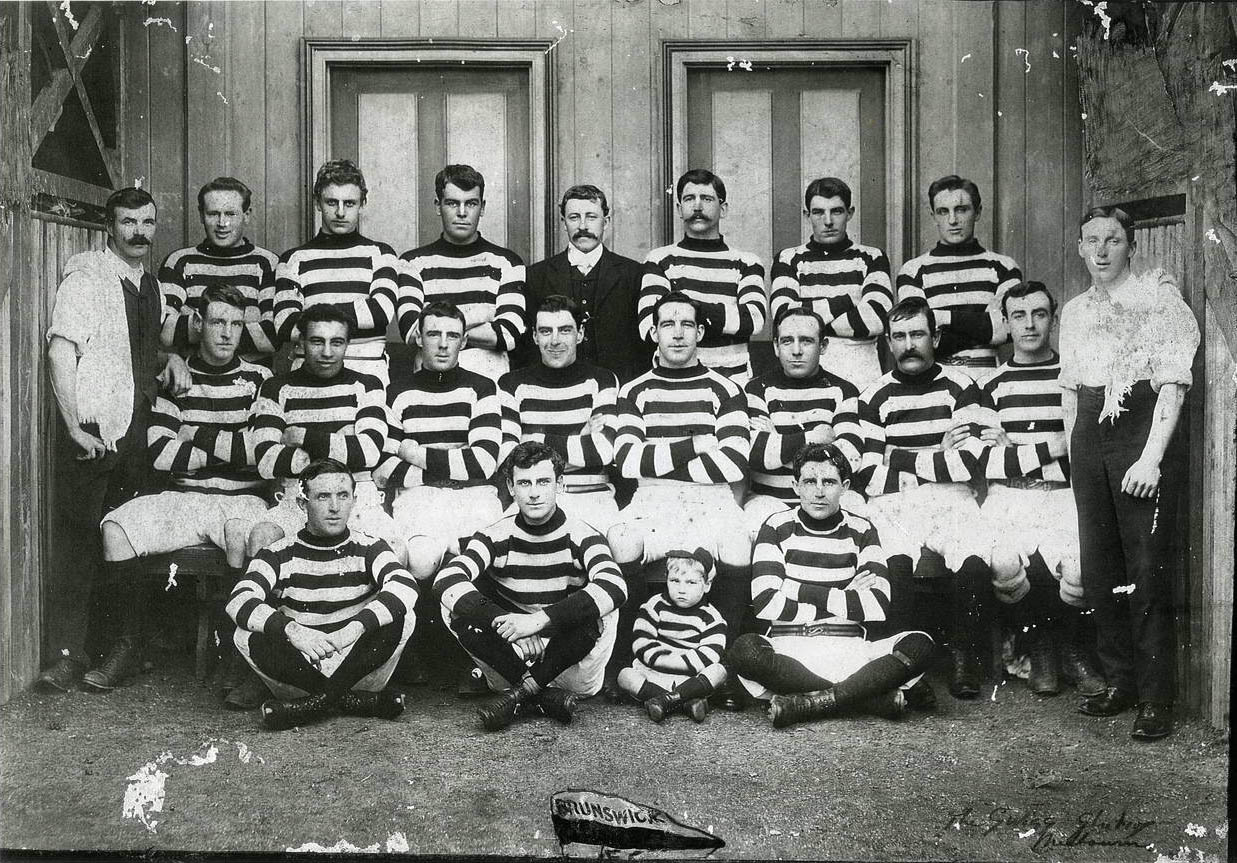
- Brunswick FC, premiers
- Teams: 10
- Premiers: Brunswick; 1st premiership
- Minor premiers: Prahran; 1st minor premiership

The 1909 Victorian Football Association season was the 33rd season of the Australian rules football competition. The premiership was won by the Brunswick Football Club, after it defeated minor premiers Prahran by 17 points in the Grand Final on 25 September. It was the first premiership won by the club.

== Association Membership ==
In September 1908, a group of stakeholders emerged keen to re-form a West Melbourne Football Club under an entirely new committee, after the club had been banished from the Association for attempting to join the VFL in 1908. The same process had taken place to re-establish a North Melbourne Football Club during the previous preseason. The new club was established under the name of City of Melbourne Football Club and applied to join the Association.

At the Association's meeting on 2 November 1908, the application was rejected based on concern about the effect of an eleventh club on the Association's strength. The Association instead proposed that City of Melbourne consider amalgamating with North Melbourne, with the merged entity to be named either City of Melbourne or Melbourne (Association), with prominent public figures confirming that a more central name and image would open the club to wider public support. The proposal was discussed in December, but the North Melbourne members preferred to retain their traditional image, and voted down the proposal by 37–18. As such, the membership of the Association remained unchanged for 1909.

== Premiership ==
The home-and-home season was played over eighteen rounds, with each club playing the others twice; then, the top four clubs contested a finals series under the amended Argus system to determine the premiers for the season.

=== Ladder ===
1909 VFA ladder
Pos	Team	Pld	W	L	D	PF	PA	PP	Pts
1	Prahran	18	16	2	0	1144	739	154.8	64
2	Essendon	18	15	3	0	1068	556	192.1	60
3	Brunswick (P)	18	11	7	0	996	729	136.6	44
4	Footscray	18	11	7	0	928	737	125.9	44
5	Williamstown	18	11	7	0	843	700	120.4	44
6	Brighton	18	11	7	0	877	802	109.4	44
7	North Melbourne	18	5	13	0	758	1009	75.1	20
8	Preston	18	5	13	0	753	1062	70.9	20
9	Northcote	18	3	15	0	667	1202	55.5	12
10	Port Melbourne	18	2	16	0	545	1054	51.7	8

Rules for classification: 1) points; 2) percentage; 3) number of points for.
(P) Premiers

=== Finals ===
==== Semi-finals ====
	Semi Finals
Saturday, 4 September	Prahran 5.6 (36)	def. by	Brunswick 8.6 (54)	Melbourne Cricket Ground (crowd: 10,000)
Saturday, 11 September	Essendon 11.12 (78)	def.	Footscray 5.7 (37)	North Melbourne Recreation Reserve (crowd: 15,000)

==== Preliminary Final ====
	Preliminary Final
Saturday, 18 September	Essendon 6.8 (44)	def. by	Brunswick 7.12 (54)	North Melbourne Recreation Reserve (crowd: 25,000)

==== Grand Final ====
1909 VFA Grand Final
Saturday, 25 September	Prahran	def. by	Brunswick	North Melbourne Recreation Reserve (crowd: 20,000)
4.2 (26); 6.4 (40); 8.4 (52); 8.7 (55)	Q1; Q2; Q3; Final	0.1 (1); 3.7 (25); 5.10 (40); 10.12 (72)	Umpires: T. Kendall
Farmer 3, White 2, Hall, Sykes, Wilson	Goals	H. Braid 2, Marsh 2, O'Shea 2, Chase, Everett, Heaphy, Turnbull

== Notable events ==
- Northcote moved its home ground from Northcote Park to Croxton Park from this season.
