= Ron Hobba =

Australian rules footballer, born 1918

Personal information
- Full name: Ronald Charles Hobba
- Born: 15 March 1918; Footscray, Victoria
- Died: 14 January 1999 (aged 80)
- Original team: Brunswick

Playing career^{1}
Years	Club	Games (Goals)
1943	Melbourne	8 (0)
- ^{1} Playing statistics correct to the end of 1943.

Ronald Charles Hobba (15 March 1918 – 14 January 1999) was an Australian rules footballer who played with Melbourne in the Victorian Football League (VFL).
