= 1900 VFA season =

1900 premiership season
- Teams: 9
- Premiers: Footscray; 3rd premiership

The 1900 Victorian Football Association season was the 24th season of the Australian rules football competition. The premiership was won by the Footscray Football Club; it was the third premiership in the club's history, and the third in a sequence of three premierships won consecutively from 1898 to 1900.

== Association membership ==
The size of the association increased from eight teams to nine in 1899, with the Essendon Town Football Club joining the association. Essendon Town was newly established as a senior club in March 1900, and played its matches at the Essendon Cricket Ground – distinguishing it from the existing Essendon Football Club (formerly in the Association but now competing in the League), which played its home matches at the East Melbourne Cricket Ground, approximately six miles away from Essendon. Like its league counterpart, Essendon Town wore black and red uniforms. Brunswick, which until this season had worn black and red uniforms, changed to black and white uniforms.

== Ladder ==
The premiership was decided on the basis of the best record across sixteen rostered matches, with each club playing the others twice.

1900 VFA ladder
| Pos | Team | Pld | W | L | D | PF | PA | Pts |
|---|---|---|---|---|---|---|---|---|
| 1 | Footscray (P) | 16 | 15 | 1 | 0 | 847 | 357 | 60 |
| 2 | Williamstown | 16 | 13 | 3 | 0 | 568 | 411 | 52 |
| 3 | Richmond | 16 | 10 | 6 | 0 | 550 | 564 | 40 |
| 4 | Prahran | 16 | 9 | 7 | 0 | 689 | 637 | 36 |
| 5 | Port Melbourne | 16 | 8 | 8 | 0 | 536 | 546 | 32 |
| 6 | North Melbourne | 16 | 7 | 9 | 0 | 582 | 560 | 28 |
| 7 | Brunswick | 16 | 6 | 10 | 0 | 498 | 558 | 24 |
| 8 | Essendon Town | 16 | 3 | 13 | 0 | 441 | 669 | 12 |
| 9 | West Melbourne | 16 | 1 | 15 | 0 | 415 | 819 | 4 |

Rules for classification: 1) points; 2) percentage; 3) number of points for.
(P) Premiers

== Awards ==
- The leading goalkicker for the season was Daily of Footscray, who kicked 34 goals.

== Notable events ==
- On 30 June, Brunswick forfeited its away match against Williamstown after club officials forgot to bring the players' uniforms to the game; Williamstown won the match in a walkover, taking the field and scoring a single goal against no opposition as a formality. It was subsequently decided not to award the match to Williamstown as a walkover, and the match was rescheduled for 8 September, the Saturday after the end of the season; but as the game could have no bearing on the final placings, Brunswick opted to forfeit once again.
- On 15 September, premiers Footscray played against a combined Association team at the North Melbourne Recreation Reserve, for the benefit of the family of deceased North Melbourne committeeman Frank Mitchell. The combined Association team 8.13 (61) defeated Footscray 3.6 (24).

== See also ==
- Victorian Football Association/Victorian Football League history (1877–2008)
- List of VFA premiers
- History of Australian rules football in Victoria (1853–1900)
