= Keith Burns (Australian footballer) =

Australian rules footballer and coach

Personal information
- Full name: Keith Burns
- Born: 25 November 1939 (age 86)
- Original team: Preston Wanderers
- Height: 170 cm (5 ft 7 in)
- Weight: 81 kg (179 lb)
- Position: Rover

Playing career^{1}
Years	Club	Games (Goals)
1957–61	Collingwood	28 (32)
- ^{1} Playing statistics correct to the end of 1961.

Keith Burns (born 25 November 1939) is a former Australian rules footballer who played for Collingwood in the Victorian Football League (VFL).

Burns, a rover, was recruited to Collingwood from Preston. He kicked 25 goals in 1960, three of them in a match winning performance against Fitzroy in the Preliminary Final. Burns was then in the forward pocket when Collingwood were comprehensively beaten by Melbourne in the Grand Final.

He joined Sandringham in 1962 and won the J. J. Liston Trophy that season. Burns however missed the Grand Final, where Sandringham beat Moorabbin by a single point. He captained the Victorian Football Association in the 1966 Hobart Carnival, by which time he had become captain-coach of Brunswick. Burns later coached Collingwood's Under-19s football team.
