= Glenn Gingell =

Australian rules footballer

Personal information
- Full name: Glenn Alan Gingell
- Born: 16 May 1953 (age 73)
- Original team: Kingsville
- Height: 183 cm (6 ft 0 in)
- Weight: 79 kg (174 lb)

Playing career^{1}
Years	Club	Games (Goals)
1973–76	Footscray	45 (21)
- ^{1} Playing statistics correct to the end of 1976.

Glenn Alan Gingell (born 16 May 1953) is a former Australian rules footballer who played with Footscray in the Victorian Football League (VFL).

After leaving Footscray, Gingell played two seasons with Brunswick (VFA).
