= Geoff McInnes =

Australian rules footballer

Personal information
- Full name: Geoffrey A. McInnes
- Born: 5 February 1909
- Died: 23 March 1988 (aged 79)
- Original team: Port Melbourne
- Height: 185 cm (6 ft 1 in)
- Weight: 79 kg (174 lb)
- Position: Forward

Playing career^{1}
Years	Club	Games (Goals)
1932–1933	Melbourne	5 (4)
1934	St Kilda	3 (2)
Total		8 (6)
- ^{1} Playing statistics correct to the end of 1934.

Geoff McInnes (5 February 1909 – 23 March 1988) was an Australian rules footballer who played for Melbourne and St Kilda in the Victorian Football League (VFL) during the 1930s.

== Football ==
McInnes started out at Melbourne and kicked three goals on debut but it wasn't enough to prevent a loss to South Melbourne, for whom club great Herbie Matthews was also debuting. He didn't experience a single victory in his two seasons at Melbourne but did play in a winning side when he crossed to St Kilda in 1934.

He had success at Brunswick later in the decade and topped the VFA's goal-kicking with 84 goals in 1937.
