= Jack Edwards (Australian footballer, born 1931) =

Australian rules footballer and coach

Personal information
- Full name: John Douglas Edwards
- Born: 26 February 1931
- Died: 23 August 2014 (aged 83)
- Original team: West Brunswick Juniors
- Height: 180 cm (5 ft 11 in)
- Weight: 76 kg (168 lb)

Playing career^{1}
| Years | Club | Games (Goals) |
| 1951–1959 | North Melbourne | 114 (1) |
- ^{1} Playing statistics correct to the end of 1959.

John Douglas Edwards (26 February 1931 – 23 August 2014) was an Australian rules footballer who played with North Melbourne in the Victorian Football League (VFL) during the 1950s.

Edwards was a fullback and won a Syd Barker Medal in 1956 for North Melbourne's best and fairest player. He also represented Victoria at interstate football towards the end of his career.

After retiring as a player, he became a coach in the VFA for both Coburg and Brunswick. He remained involved in the game as well as a football commentator on TV.
