= Daryl O'Brien =

Australian rules footballer and coach

Personal information
- Born: 10 September 1941 (age 85)
- Original team: West Coburg
- Height: 179 cm (5 ft 10 in)
- Weight: 81.5 kg (180 lb)
- Position: Utility

Playing career^{1}
Years	Club	Games (Goals)
1960–1969	North Melbourne	135 (8)

International team honours
Years	Team	Games (Goals)
1968	"The Galahs"	

Coaching career
Years	Club	Games (W–L–D)
1972–1973	Brunswick (VFA)	40 (25–14–1)
- ^{1} Playing statistics correct to the end of 1969.

Career highlights
- North Melbourne: Best and fairest runner up 1964; Night premiership 1965, 1966; Deputy vice-captain 1969; Awarded life membership 1969; Named in NMFC's list of Top 150 Players of All Time for the club's 150th Anniversary (2019); Brunswick: Grand Final coach 1973; Team of the Century

Daryl Ernest O'Brien (born 10 September 1941) is a former Australian rules footballer and coach who played 135 games for the North Melbourne in the Victorian Football League (VFL) during the 1960s.

A utility player who started on the half-back flank, he was considered one of the toughest and most effective "taggers" of the period as well as one of the hardest men to beat one-on-one in the league. O'Brien's tagging role embodied a who's who of top players of that era, including Ron Barassi, Bobby Skilton, Peter Hudson, Alex Jesaulenko, Peter Crimmins, Darrel Baldock, Roger Dean, John Sharrock, Des Tuddenham, Ted Whitten and John Northey.

Recruited from West Coburg, O'Brien captained North Melbourne's under-19 side for almost two years before playing a handful of senior games as a half-forward flanker in the 1960 season. He was dropped to the reserves for the whole year of 1961. In the lead-up to the 1962 season, O'Brien was invited to train by both Essendon and Footscray. O'Brien formally requested a clearance to Footscray, seeing it as an opportunity to play again at the senior level. This prompted a re-think by North Melbourne; O'Brien was retained, reinventing himself as a half-back flanker and utility player. He excelled in these roles, justifying North's decision to turn down the transfer. O'Brien became a stalwart in the Kangaroo side for the next eight seasons, and in 1964 was runner-up to Noel Teasdale in the Syd Barker Medal, North Melbourne's best and fairest award.

In 1968, O'Brien was selected to represent Australia as part of the Australian Football World Tour, the second of the international rules football series against Ireland.

In 1970, O'Brien joined Victorian Football Association (VFA) team Brunswick, and was appointed the dual role of captain-coach at the end of the 1971 season. He led the side to a Second Division Grand Final appearance in 1973, after which he announced his playing days were over.

In 1974 and 1975 O'Brien served in the North Melbourne match committee as a team selector under premiership coach Ron Barassi.

While playing senior football, O'Brien studied to become a licensed realtor and auctioneer, eventually becoming a director and later partner of a real estate business in Melbourne, Victoria. He is now retired and lives in Gowanbrae, Victoria.
