= Colin Dell =

Australian rules footballer

Personal information
- Full name: Colin Dell
- Born: 25 May 1952 (age 74)
- Original team: Yallourn
- Height: 180 cm (5 ft 11 in)
- Weight: 75 kg (165 lb)
- Position: Defence

Playing career^{1}
Years	Club	Games (Goals)
1971–77	Footscray	66 (10)
- ^{1} Playing statistics correct to the end of 1977.

Colin Dell (born 25 May 1952) is a former Australian rules footballer who played with Footscray in the Victorian Football League (VFL).

After leaving Footscray in 1977, Dell played two seasons with Brunswick in the VFA.
