= Roy McKay (footballer) =

Australian rules footballer and coach

Personal information
- Full name: Claude Roy McKay
- Born: 25 March 1909; Illabarook, Victoria
- Died: 12 July 1998 (aged 89)
- Height: 185 cm (6 ft 1 in)
- Weight: 84 kg (185 lb)
- Position: Utility/Defender

Playing career^{1}
Years	Club	Games (Goals)
1927–29	Williamstown (VFA)	49 (3)
1930–35	Footscray	101 (10)
1936–40	Brunswick (VFA)	90 (52)
- ^{1} Playing statistics correct to the end of 1935.

Career highlights
- 1938 VFA Premiership

Claude Roy McKay (25 March 1909 – 12 July 1998) was an Australian rules footballer who played for Footscray in the Victorian Football League (VFL) during the early 1930s.

McKay, who came to Footscray from Victorian Football Association (VFA) club Williamstown, was a durable utility who rarely missed a game. He was used mostly as a defender and twice represented the VFL at interstate football.

After bringing up his 100th league game in 1935, McKay joined Brunswick as captain-coach, a position he remained in until retiring in 1940. He was the centre half back and captain-coach of Brunswick's 1938 premiership team, with a 33-point victory over Brighton. The previous season, and again in 1939, McKay steered Brunswick to Grand Finals but finished on the losing side on both occasions.

McKay went on to coach Melbourne's Thirds in 1952 and coached the Seconds (Reserves) coach from 1956 to 1958 and again in 1962 and 1964. McKay coached the Melbourne reserves team that won the 1956 flag in front of a record crowd of 115,802 fans. The scores were: Melbourne 16.14.110 defeated South Melbourne 10.12.72.

McKay has the Melbourne Football Club's Past Players' Golf Day named in his honour - Roy McKay Trophy Golf Day. He was named a life member of the Melbourne Football Club in 1959.
