= Alby Murdoch =

Australian rules footballer (1935–2010)

Personal information
- Full name: Albert Henry Murdoch
- Born: 18 January 1935
- Died: 15 December 2010 (aged 75)
- Original team: Lincoln Stars
- Height: 170 cm (5 ft 7 in)
- Weight: 67 kg (148 lb)

Playing career^{1}
Years	Club	Games (Goals)
1957–1962	Essendon	65 (7)
- ^{1} Playing statistics correct to the end of 1962.

Albert Henry Murdoch (18 January 1935 – 15 December 2010) was an Australian rules footballer who played with Essendon in the Victorian Football League (VFL).

Murdoch, an Essendon High School Old Boy, was in North Melbourne's recruiting zone but opted to instead qualify for Essendon. He won the Essendon District Football League best and fairest award in 1956, while playing for the Lincoln Stars.

A wingman, first played for Essendon in 1957 and was a regular fixture in the side from 1958. He was a member of the team which lost the 1959 VFL Grand Final.

He appeared in the opening round of the 1962 season but then injured his knee and missed out on participating in Essendon's premiership side that year.

Once he left Essendon he played at both Stanhope and Brunswick, in 1963 and 1964 respectively. Murdoch was then coach of the Strathmore Under-17s for eight seasons and he steered them to two premierships. He was also senior coach of the Doutta Stars for one year.
