= Tony West (footballer) =

Australian rules footballer

Personal information
- Full name: Anthony L. West
- Born: 11 September 1956 (age 70)
- Original team: Brunswick
- Height: 179 cm (5 ft 10 in)
- Weight: 76 kg (168 lb)
- Position: Rover

Playing career^{1}
Years	Club	Games (Goals)
1982–84	Essendon	8 (8)
- ^{1} Playing statistics correct to the end of 1984.

Anthony L. "Tony" West (born 11 September 1956) is a former Australian rules footballer who played for Essendon in the Victorian Football League (VFL) during the early 1980s.

Originally from the Carlton Reserves, West was a member of the 1980 Brunswick Victorian Football Association Second Division premiership team.

He made two appearances with Essendon in 1982 before spending the rest of the year on the sidelines with a broken leg. He kicked bags of four goals with his first two games of the 1983 VFL season, the only goals of his league career. Due to the strength of the Essendon team, West made only played one game in their premiership year of 1984 and instead spent most of his time in the reserves where he won a Best and Fairest.

A rover, West resumed at Brunswick in 1985 and participated in another Second Division premiership that year.

He was a J. J. Liston Trophy winner in 1986 and had earlier, in 1981, been runner-up to Vic Aanensen.
