= Col Crawford =

Australian rules footballer, born 1913

Personal information
- Full name: Colin Frederick Crawford
- Born: 14 May 1913; Brunswick, Victoria
- Died: 29 December 2007 (aged 94)
- Original team: Essendon Juniors
- Height: 173 cm (5 ft 8 in)
- Weight: 67 kg (148 lb)

Playing career^{1}
Years	Club	Games (Goals)
1934–35	Essendon	20 (6)
1936	Fitzroy	1 (0)
Total		21 (6)
- ^{1} Playing statistics correct to the end of 1936.

Colin Frederick Crawford (14 May 1913 – 29 December 2007) was an Australian rules footballer who played with Essendon and Fitzroy in the Victorian Football League (VFL).

== Career ==
Crawford was a rover and wingman, recruited from Essendon Juniors.

He made eight appearances for Essendon in the 1934 VFL season, then in 1935 played 12 league games and represented Victoria against Bendigo.

Crawford got a clearance to Fitzroy in 1936 and debuted for the club in the opening round against Carlton. Crawford, who also kept wicket for the Fitzroy Cricket Club, didn't appear again at VFL level and was granted a clearance to Brunswick mid-season.

A member of Brunswick's 1938 premiership team, Crawford was appointed captain-coach for the 1941 VFA season. Brunswick would fall one win short of making the finals.
