= Jack McKenzie (footballer, born 1881) =

Australian rules footballer and coach

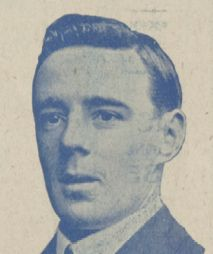

Personal information
- Full name: John Joseph McKenzie
- Nickname: Dookie
- Born: 10 November 1881; Fitzroy North, Victoria
- Died: 21 March 1946 (aged 64); Melbourne, Victoria
- Original team: Brunswick
- Height: 178 cm (5 ft 10 in)
- Weight: 76 kg (168 lb)
- Position: Ruckman

Playing career^{1}
Years	Club	Games (Goals)
1898–1900	Brunswick (VFA)	38 (37)
1901–1902	Essendon (VFL)	32 (26)
1903	White Feather (WAGFA)	
1904–1906	Essendon (VFL)	49 (64)
1907	Essendon Association (VFA)	13 (23)
1908–1914	Brunswick (VFA)	84 (98)
1915	Melbourne (VFL)	16 (10)

Coaching career
Years	Club	Games (W–L–D)
1915	Melbourne	17 (9–8–0)
- ^{1} Playing statistics correct to the end of 1915.

Career highlights
- VFL premiership: 1901; VFA Representative: 1907, 1911, 1912 (8 games, 14 goals); W. S. Crichton Medallist: 1906; Essendon captain: 1906; Melbourne captain: 1915

John Joseph "Dookie" McKenzie (10 November 1881 – 21 March 1946) was an Australian rules footballer who played with Essendon and Melbourne in the Victorian Football League (VFL).

He gained the nickname "Dookie" from his favourite player as a youth, Alex "Dookie" McKenzie, a Carlton and Melbourne player of the 1880s, and 1890s.

== Family ==
The son of John McKenzie, and Johanna McKenzie, née Scott, John Joseph McKenzie was born in Fitzroy North, Victoria on 10 November 1881.

He married twice.

His first wife, Mary Ellen McCann (1886-1918) died in July 1918. Their son, John James McKenzie (1908-), played for Essendon in 1929.

McKenzie fell on hard times in 1918 when his wife died, leaving him without work and with six children to look after. A fund was set up by the VFL to give him financial support, with many clubs donating money.

He married his second wife, Winifred Zipporah Griffiths (1884-1969), née Simmons, in 1922.

== Football ==
McKenzie played for Fitroy Juniors for half a season before going to Brunswick in the Victorian Football Association (VFA).

He joined Essendon in 1901, winning a premiership in his first season. He played for Essendon in 1901 and 1902. He then moved to Western Australia and spent a year playing in the Western Australian Goldfields Football Association with the White Feather Football Club.

In 1904 he returned to Essendon and by 1906 he was the captain. For his efforts during the 1906 season he was Essendon's best and fairest winner in his last season for the Bombers. He finished his career with Essendon having played 81 games and kicking 90 goals playing as a ruckman.

In 1907 season he became captain-coach of Essendon Association in the VFA before taking on the same role at his original club Brunswick from 1908 to 1914.

He led the Brunswick to a premiership in his second season, 1909. During the last month or so of that season, The Argus newspaper conducted a public vote on which players were considered a champion in both the VFL and the VFA. McKenzie won the Association poll with a tally of near 18,000 votes, a figure which outstripped that of the League winner Bill Busbridge. As captain, McKenzie was offered £150 to throw the 1911 Grand Final against Essendon Association; McKenzie refused and immediately reported the offer to the Association.

He returned to the VFL for just one season in 1915, playing this time with Melbourne. As captain-coach he helped them reach the finals for the first time in fifteen years, becoming one of a select few players to captain two different clubs in finals.

=== Hawthorn (VFA) ===
Hawthorn returned to the VFA in 1919 — having not played in 1916, 1917, and 1918 due to World War I — and McKenzie was appointed as coach for the 1919 season.

=== St. Patricks (O&MFA) ===
McKenzie coached Albury based football club, St. Patrick's to Ovens & Murray Football League premierships in 1921 and 1922.

== Death ==
He died on 21 March 1946.
