= Jim Jenkins (footballer) =

Australian rules footballer

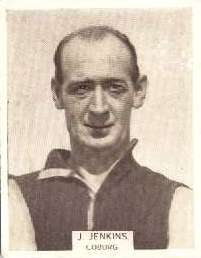

Personal information
- Full name: James Walter Thomas Jenkins
- Born: 15 February 1897; Campbell Town, Tasmania
- Died: 25 April 1983 (aged 86)
- Original team: North Launceston
- Height: 193 cm (6 ft 4 in)
- Weight: 89 kg (196 lb)
- Position: Ruckman

Playing career^{1}
Years	Club	Games (Goals)
1921–25	St Kilda	50 (16)
1925–33	Coburg (VFA)	174 (40)
1934–35	Brunswick (VFA)	

Coaching career
Years	Club	Games (W–L–D)
1929–31	Coburg (VFA)	60 (34–23–3)
1934–35	Brunswick (VFA)	36 (14–22–0)
- ^{1} Playing statistics correct to the end of 1935.

James Walter Thomas Jenkins (15 February 1897 – 25 April 1983) was an Australian rules footballer who played with St Kilda in the Victorian Football League (VFL). Jenkins also coached Coburg and Brunswick in the Victorian Football Association (VFA). He is a ruckman in the Coburg Football Club Team of the Century.

== Early life in Tasmania ==
Born in Campbell Town, Tasmania on 15 February 1897, Jenkins was one of 12 children.

He played his early football with North Launceston in the Northern Tasmanian Football Association.

== St Kilda ==
In 1921, at 24, Jenkins moved to the mainland and joined St Kilda. Jenkins, who was a follower, played 16 games in each of his first three seasons.

Jenkins appeared in the opening round of the season in 1924, then left to coach Orbost.

He returned to St Kilda for the 1925 VFL season and again played the opening round of the season, which would be his 50th and final appearance for St Kilda.

Soon after, Jenkins was granted a permit to join Coburg in the Victorian Football Association.

== VFA ==
Jenkins was the ruckman in Coburg's 1926, 1927 and 1928 premiership teams. A best and fairest winner in 1928, Jenkins was appointed captain-coach the following season. In his three seasons as coach, from 1929 to 1931, Coburg were unable to make the finals. He finished equal third in the 1930 Recorder Cup, but had his best finish in 1932, when he was equal second, one vote behind Northcote player Bob Ross. He left Coburg as the club's games record holder.

He captain-coached Brunswick in 1934 and 1935.
