= Jack McKenzie (footballer, born 1908) =

Australian rules footballer, born 1908

Personal information
- Full name: John James McKenzie
- Born: 19 August 1908; Brunswick, Victoria
- Died: 1 August 1939 (aged 30)
- Original team: Geelong Seconds

Playing career^{1}
Years	Club	Games (Goals)
1929	Essendon	5 (1)
- ^{1} Playing statistics correct to the end of 1929.

John James McKenzie (19 August 1908 – 1 August 1939) was an Australian rules footballer who played with Essendon in the Victorian Football League (VFL).

== Family ==
The son of Essendon, Brunswick, and Melbourne footballer, John Joseph "Dookie" McKenzie (1881–1946), and Mary Ellen McKenzie (1886-1918), née McCann, John James McKenzie was born at Brunswick, Victoria on 19 August 1908.

He married Lorna Mavis Ireland (1912-) on 29 April 1933. They were divorced in 1939.

== Football ==
Recruited from Geelong Seconds as a half-forward or centreman, "he was hailed as a potential champion but did not fulfil this early promise".

He played five consecutive games for Essendon in 1929: the first against South Melbourne, at Windy Hill, on 25 May 1929, and the last against Melbourne at Windy Hill, on 29 June 1929.
