= Norm Busbridge =

Australian rules footballer

Personal information
- Full name: Joseph Norman Busbridge
- Born: 23 October 1887; Essendon, Victoria
- Died: 27 June 1953 (aged 65); Essendon, Victoria
- Height: 178 cm (5 ft 10 in)
- Weight: 79 kg (174 lb)

Playing career^{1}
Years	Club	Games (Goals)
1907	Essendon	5 (0)
- ^{1} Playing statistics correct to the end of 1907.

Joseph Norman Busbridge (23 October 1887 – 27 June 1953) was an Australian rules footballer who played with Essendon in the Victorian Football League (VFL).

== Family ==
The son of William Ethebert Busbridge (1861-1937) and Margaret Jane Busbridge (1870-1895), née Smith, and the brother of Bill Busbridge, he was born on 23 October 1887. He died on 27 June 1953. He married Emma Mary Fletcher Hollingworth (1883-1949) on 12 April 1911. They had a son, Ronald (1917-).

== Football ==
Recruited from Essendon Association Football Club in the VFA, he played in five of the first six games in the 1907 season for the Essendon Football Club, missing round three due to injury, each of them alongside his brother Bill. Busbridge transferred to Williamstown in the VFA in 1912 and played 59 games and kicked 24 goals from 1912-15 and 1919-20, his career being interrupted by war service, as detailed below. Busbridge was vice-captain in 1914 before resigning in June in the belief that the role was effecting his on-field performance. He became coach of Williamstown Juniors in 1921 before resigning in July and being replaced by future Williamstown coach for part of 1931 and all of 1932, Jim Toohey.

== Military service ==
He served in the First AIF. He enlisted on 17 August 1914. His Service Record simply notes that he was discharged as "medically unfit" on 27 August 1914. He successfully re-enlisted on 17 January 1916, with his enlistment declaration indicating that the grounds upon which he had been discharged in 1914 was to do with his teeth. He was discharged in June 1919, having served overseas in France, and having attained the rank of Corporal.
