= Leo McInerney =

Australian rules footballer

Personal information
- Full name: Thomas Leo McInerney
- Born: 24 April 1898; Carlton, Victoria
- Died: 29 December 1963 (aged 65); Footscray, Victoria
- Original team: West Melbourne
- Height: 180 cm (5 ft 11 in)
- Weight: 72 kg (159 lb)
- Position: Forward

Playing career^{1}
Years	Club	Games (Goals)
1918–1919	Essendon	12 (2)
1919–1931	Brunswick (VFA)	160 (479)
- ^{1} Playing statistics correct to the end of 1931.

Thomas Leo McInerney (24 April 1898 – 29 December 1963) was an Australian rules footballer who played for Essendon in the Victorian Football League (VFL).

McInerney was one of six Essendon players to debut against Richmond in the opening round of the 1918 VFL season and kicked the only two goals of his VFL career.

During the 1920s, he played in the VFA at Brunswick and was an important member of their 1925 premiership success with 79 goals for the year. That was enough to top the league's goal-kicking, as was his tally of 84 goals in 1929.
