= Les Boyd (Australian rules footballer) =

Australian rules footballer

Personal information
- Full name: William Leslie Boyd
- Born: 1 March 1895; Prahran, Victoria
- Died: 16 November 1964 (aged 69); South Melbourne, Victoria
- Original team: Windsor
- Height: 170 cm (5 ft 7 in)
- Position: Forward

Playing career^{1}
Years	Club	Games (Goals)
1915–1919	St Kilda	42 (43)
1920–1922	Melbourne	17 (6)
Total		59 (49)
- ^{1} Playing statistics correct to the end of 1922.

William Leslie "Les" Boyd (1 March 1895 – 16 November 1964) was an Australian rules footballer who played with St Kilda and Melbourne in the Victorian Football League (VFL).

Originally from Windsor, Boyd started at St Kilda in 1915 and kicked 16 goals that year up forward, including three on debut. He finished second in St Kilda's goal-kicking. In 1916 and 1917, Boyd did not make any appearances, as his club was in recess due to World War I. When he returned in 1918 he kicked 17 goals, to top St Kilda's goal-kicking. He spent one more season at St Kilda before moving to the Melbourne Football Club.

He transferred to Victorian Football Association side Brighton in 1922, where he played until 1927, when he accepted an offer to coach Port Fairy. In 1929 he signed with Sandringham, for which he would play 47 games for and kick 101 goals. Boyd was their leading goal-kicker in each of his three seasons at the club. He was also their coach for the second half of the 1930 season.
