= Greg McLatchie =

Greg McLatchie is a consultant surgeon in Hartlepool NHS Trust and professor of sports medicine at the University of Sunderland. For five years he was director of the National Sports Medicine Institute. He is the author of several textbooks and scholarly articles on sports medicine and surgery, and a volume of poetry. In 2010 he chaired the International Sports Science and Sports Medicine conference in Newcastle upon Tyne.

== Books ==
- McLatchie, Greg; Borley, Neil; Chikwe, Joanna, eds. (2007). Oxford handbook of clinical surgery. Oxford: Oxford University Press. ISBN 978-0-19-856825-4.
- McLatchie, Greg R.; Leaper, David (2006). Operative surgery. Oxford: Oxford University Press. ISBN 978-0-19-851056-7.
- McLatchie, Greg; Harries, Mark; Williams, Clyde; et al., eds. (2000). ABC of sports medicine. London: BMJ. ISBN 978-0-7279-1366-1.
- McLatchie, Greg (2008). The Keeper and His Lad: Poems of Another Age. Oxford: Offox. ISBN 978-1-904202-02-8.

== Journal articles ==
- McLatchie, GR (2010). "Sport and exercise and the prevention and treatment of disease". Scottish Medical Journal. 55 (2): 5–7. doi:10.1258/rsmsmj.55.2.5. PMID 20533692.
- McLatchie, GR (2010). "Sport and exercise medicine--the state of play". Scottish Medical Journal. 55 (2): 3–4. doi:10.1258/rsmsmj.55.2.3. PMID 20533691.
- Packer, G J; McLatchie, G R; Bowden, W (1993). "Scapula winging in a sports injury clinic". British Journal of Sports Medicine. 27 (2): 90–1. doi:10.1136/bjsm.27.2.90. PMC 1332126. PMID 8395302.
