= 1921 VFA season =

1921 VFA premiership season
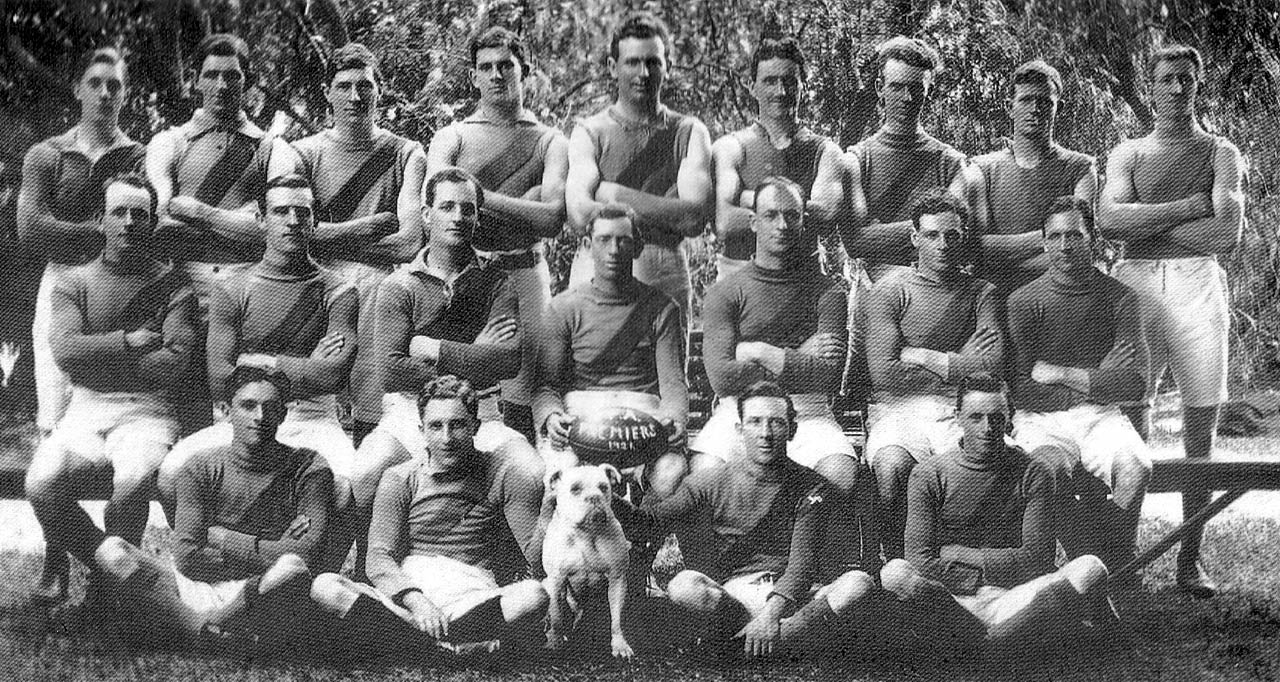
- Williamstown FC team, premiers
- Teams: 10
- Premiers: Williamstown; 2nd premiership
- Minor premiers: Footscray; 5th minor premiership

The 1921 Victorian Football Association season was the 43rd season of the Australian rules football competition.

The premiership was won by the Williamstown Football Club, after it came from fourth on the home-and-home ladder to defeat minor premiers Footscray by 18 points in the Grand Final, played very late in the year on 22 October. It was the club's second VFA premiership.

The season was disrupted when the North Melbourne Football Club abruptly disbanded at midseason, a consequence of wide-ranging off-field manoeuvres in both the VFA and the VFL, which stemmed from the closure the East Melbourne Cricket Ground.

== Closure of the East Melbourne Cricket Ground ==
=== Essendon (League) proposed move to North Melbourne ===
In November 1920, the state Railways Commission announced that the East Melbourne Cricket Ground was to be closed at the end of 1921 to allow for the Flinders Street Railyard to be expanded. This meant that the Essendon (League) Football Club, which had played its home games at the venue since 1882, needed to find a new home ground. The club considered the North Melbourne Recreation Reserve and the Essendon Recreation Reserve, homes to the North Melbourne and Essendon (Association) Football Clubs respectively. Although simple sentiment might suggest that Essendon (L.) would automatically favour the venue in its namesake town, the reality of the time was that the club also had strong ties to the North Melbourne area; the neighbouring suburbs of North Melbourne, West Melbourne and Kensington had been one of the most fruitful regions of Essendon's (L.) recruiting district, and a vast majority of its members resided in those three suburbs, not in Essendon town. In late June 1921, the club announced that it would move to North Melbourne rather than Essendon. The higher gate available at the more centrally located North Melbourne ground was a key contributing factor. Essendon-based members were angry that the club had not taken the opportunity to return to Essendon town.

This move was seen as a strong opportunity for the town of North Melbourne to be represented in the League. It was widely believed – by sportswriters and the North Melbourne Club committee – that a League club based in North Melbourne would not be able to retain the Essendon name and identity for more than a few years, as it would likely be taken over by or rebranded as a North Melbourne Club as soon as the North Melbourne-based members had a voting majority. As such, even though it meant the loss of its ground – and probably the loss of its team, at least in the short term – the North Melbourne committee welcomed Essendon's (L.) decision. North Melbourne club president, Cr. Deveney, was quoted as saying "North Melbourne has for years been anxious to get into the League, and this is the only way".

=== North Melbourne Football Club disbands ===
The North Melbourne committee formally resolved that it would seek to amalgamate with Essendon (L.) for the 1922 season; then, on 30 June, it suddenly disbanded as a senior club. The club opted to disband immediately, rather than play out the season, because it believed that the Association would have banished it from playing anyway when it became clear that it was trying to amalgamate with a League team; and that by disbanding immediately, rather than waiting to be banished, it gave its players the opportunity to request transfers to other clubs prior to the July 1 deadline – an opportunity taken by eighteen players. It was a bold step, however, as the club had not yet reached any sort of agreement with Essendon (L.) regarding an amalgamation; and although Essendon (L.) had reportedly made room for two North Melbourne club delegates on its committee, it had not reached any internal decision on the matter of amalgamation – previous decisions having been focused solely on the move to the North Melbourne ground, not on any relationship with the North Melbourne club. The North Melbourne committee's swift response precluded any meeting with club members, who were naturally angry that they had not been consulted, and that the club was not going to play all the games that they had expected when they paid for their memberships.

True to North Melbourne's expectations, the Association disqualified it for its actions by a majority of 13–2, although by this stage the club was already defunct. The Association approved all of the transfers of North Melbourne players to other Association clubs; it rejected transfer permits to League clubs, but those players were still free to transfer since the League did not recognise Association permits.

=== Association protest ===
Strategically, the Association did not want to see a League club occupying the North Melbourne ground. Since the breakaway of the League in 1897, the Association had been trying, mostly unsuccessfully, to establish and maintain a presence in inner city Melbourne, where the potential for gate takings was higher. It had lost all of its most central clubs in the original breakaway of the League, it had lost its next most central club, Richmond, in 1908, and its attempts to establish new central teams had been failures. North Melbourne was the most central club remaining, and the Association was determined not to lose it.

It was on these grounds that the Association protested to Mr David Oman, the state Minister for Lands, requesting that he veto Essendon's (L.) move to North Melbourne; the ground was owned by the Melbourne City Council, so the Minister for Lands had the final say on its use. On 11 August, Mr Oman upheld the Association's protest, and refused Essendon (L.) permission to use the North Melbourne ground. A deputation of residents from North Melbourne and North Melbourne club members protested, but the State Cabinet rejected the protest and upheld Mr Oman's decision on 3 October. This left North Melbourne without a senior club, Essendon (L.) without a home venue for 1922, and the future of the Essendon (A.) Club at risk as Essendon (L.) now seemed likely to move to the Essendon Recreation Reserve.

=== Resolution ===
Within two weeks of the Minister's decision being upheld, Essendon (L.) had reached an agreement with the Essendon council to play at the Essendon Recreation Reserve, initially signing a lease for the following five winters. The Essendon council had been campaigning for the League team to move to Essendon throughout the year, and had committed to spending £12,000 to re-fence the venue and build a new grandstand.

Although North Melbourne had been disqualified from the Association after announcing its intention to amalgamate with Essendon (L.), it was considered a certainty that a North Melbourne club would be re-admitted for 1922, since the Association had fought so hard through the year to keep its most central club. In December, North Melbourne was formally re-admitted, with the condition that an entirely new committee be appointed – the same condition that was placed on the club under similar circumstances in 1908. North Melbourne players who had transferred to League clubs without an Association permit remained disqualified from the Association, preventing them from returning to the reformed club – including club legends Syd Barker, Sr. and Charlie Hardy, who were both now at Essendon (L.). Although the club ceased to exist for almost six months and was formed with an entirely new committee, the re-admitted North Melbourne club is historically considered a continuation of the club which disbanded.

The Essendon (A.) club had been opposed to Essendon (L.) shifting to the Essendon Recreation Reserve, as this would clearly make its position as a senior club untenable. Once this outcome was realised, the club announced it would be disbanding in late December, before ultimately amalgamating with the reformed North Melbourne club, bringing an end to its 22-year existence.

== Premiership ==
The home-and-home season was played over eighteen rounds, with each club scheduled to play the others twice; then, the top four clubs contested a finals series under the amended Argus system to determine the premiers for the season.

Effect of North Melbourne's withdrawal on the premiership

After North Melbourne disbanded, the team which had been scheduled to play against North Melbourne each week instead had a bye. Clubs were awarded four premiership points for a bye. Williamstown was the only team which had not yet played North Melbourne when it disbanded, so it was the only club to have two byes for the year.

=== Ladder ===
1921 VFA ladder
Pos	Team	Pld	W	L	D	B	PF	PA	PP	Pts
1	Footscray	17	15	1	1	1	1271	848	66.7	66
2	Port Melbourne	17	14	3	0	1	1521	836	55.0	60
3	Brunswick	17	13	3	1	1	1215	918	75.6	58
4	Williamstown (P)	16	9	7	0	2	1192	879	73.7	44
5	Northcote	17	9	8	0	1	1128	1127	99.9	40
6	Hawthorn	17	7	10	0	1	1140	1407	123.4	32
–	North Melbourne (Note: North Melbourne forfeited its remaining matches after disbanding, resulting in an addition win for every team, and an addition two wins for Williamstown.)	8	5	3	0	–	499	409	82.0	20
7	Essendon	17	4	13	0	1	993	1186	119.4	20
8	Prahran	17	2	14	1	1	842	1401	166.4	14
9	Brighton	17	0	16	1	1	662	1452	219.3	6

Rules for classification: 1) points; 2) percentage; 3) number of points for.
(P) Premiers

=== Finals ===
	Semifinals
Saturday, 24 September	Port Melbourne 11.9 (75)	def. by	Williamstown 15.11 (101)	East Melbourne Cricket Ground (crowd: 15,000)
Saturday, 1 October	Footscray 12.5 (77)	def.	Brunswick 7.10 (52)	East Melbourne Cricket Ground (crowd: 17,000)

	Final
Saturday, 8 October	Footscray 9.7 (61)	v	Williamstown 10.5 (65)	East Melbourne Cricket Ground (crowd: 10,000)
Saturday, 15 October	Footscray 10.5 (65)	def. by	Williamstown 9.14 (68)	East Melbourne Cricket Ground (crowd: 8,000)

1921 VFA Grand Final
Saturday, 22 October	Footscray	def. by	Williamstown	Fitzroy Cricket Ground (crowd: 20,000)
0.4 (4); 3.6 (24); 5.8 (38); 5.9 (39)	Q1; Q2; Q3; Final	2.1 (13); 2.5 (17); 7.5 (47); 8.9 (57)
Samson 2, MacKenzie, Park, Smith	Goals	Carpenter 2, McAuliffe 2, Haughton, Jamieson, N. McDonald, Munro

== Notable events ==
- George Taylor (Port Melbourne) was the leading goal-kicker of the home-and-home season, with 64 goals.
- In the Round 6 match between Essendon and Williamstown on 11 June, Williamstown's Phil Skehan, who was playing his first game for club after signing with them only the previous week, was taken from the field after only fifteen minutes, after suffering a severe concussion and broken leg in a legal collision with an opponent. Skehan died from his injuries six days later.
- In the Round 10 match between Prahran and Brighton at Toorak Park, Prahran was penalised for having too many players on the field after Brighton called for a head count late in the first quarter. Prahran was leading 4.2 (26) to 2.5 (17) at the time, and its score was re-set to zero. Prahran recovered, and the match finished as a draw: Prahran 5.4 (34) to Brighton 4.10 (34). This was the only game that Brighton did not lose during the season.
- On 6 August, a combined Association team beat a combined Western Australian Goldfields Football Association team 18.10 (118) to 2.5 (17) at the East Melbourne Cricket Ground.
- The final between Footscray and Williamstown on 8 October was abandoned midway through the third quarter when the ground was hit by a heavy hailstorm, forcing the game to be replayed the following week. Williamstown was leading by four points at the time of the storm. The match was abandoned at Williamstown's insistence; Footscray preferred to return to the field after the hail delay.
- Because of the replayed final, the date scheduled for the grand final ended up being after the closure of the East Melbourne Cricket Ground, forcing the Association to find a suitable venue which was not being used for cricket at short notice. The grand final was ultimately played at the Fitzroy Cricket Ground, the first and only time this venue was used for a VFA finals match, because the Fitzroy Cricket Club had a bye that weekend.

== See also ==
- List of VFA premiers
