= Harry Plummer (Australian footballer) =

Australian rules footballer

Personal information
- Full name: Henry George Plummer
- Born: 22 April 1912; Devonport, Tasmania
- Died: 30 June 1993 (aged 81); Dalmeny, New South Wales
- Original team: Essendon Church of Christ
- Height: 179 cm (5 ft 10 in)
- Weight: 70 kg (154 lb)

Playing career^{1}
Years	Club	Games (Goals)
1934	Essendon	2 (0)
1935–1936	Oakleigh (VFA)	17 (0)
- ^{1} Playing statistics correct to the end of 1936.

Henry George Plummer (22 April 1912 – 30 June 1993) was an Australian rules footballer who played with Essendon in the Victorian Football League (VFL).

After leaving Essendon, Plummer played for two seasons with Oakleigh in the Victorian Football Association (VFA).

Plummer later served in the Royal Australian Air Force during World War II.
