= Hedley Blackmore =

Australian rules footballer, born 1901

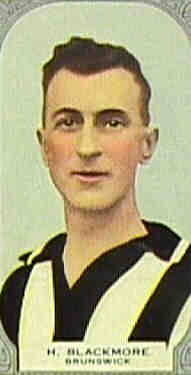
- Blackmore during his Brunswick career

Personal information
- Full name: George Hedley Blackmore
- Born: 30 January 1901; Maldon, Victoria
- Died: 22 August 1992 (aged 91); Maldon, Victoria
- Original team: Maryborough
- Height: 175 cm (5 ft 9 in)
- Weight: 76 kg (168 lb)

Playing career^{1}
Years	Club	Games (Goals)
1923–27	Carlton	51 (76)
- ^{1} Playing statistics correct to the end of 1983.

George Hedley Blackmore (30 January 1901 – 22 August 1992) was an Australian rules footballer who played with Carlton in the Victorian Football League (VFL).
