= 1908 VFA season =

1908 premiership season
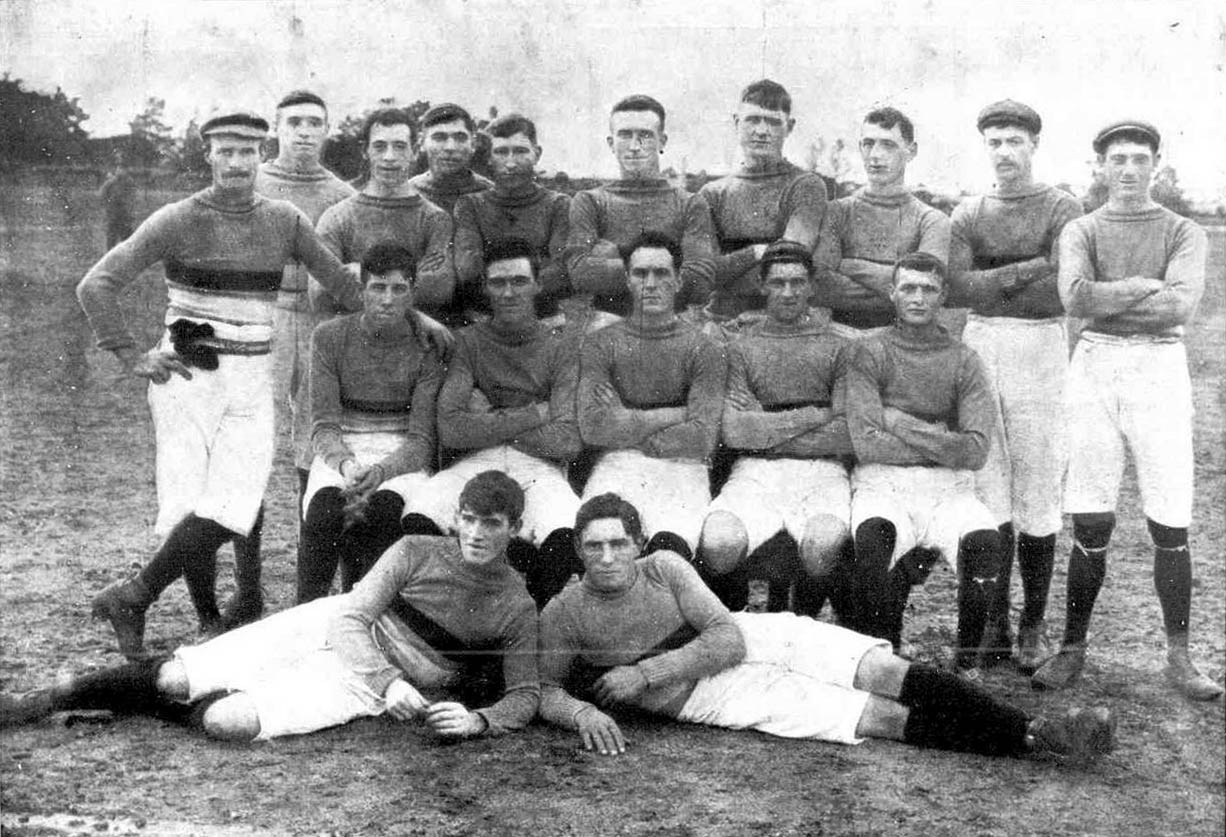
- Footscray FC team, premiers
- Teams: 10
- Premiers: Footscray; 4th premiership
- Minor premiers: Footscray; 1st minor premiership

The 1908 Victorian Football Association season was the 32nd season of the Australian rules football competition. The premiership was won by the Footscray Football Club, after it defeated Brunswick in the final by 24 points. It was the fourth premiership won by the club.

The season was preceded by a tumultuous off-season, in which the Richmond Football Club left the Association in favour of the rival Victorian Football League, and both North Melbourne and West Melbourne were banished from the Association for attempting to do likewise.

== Association membership ==
=== League expansion ===
On 4 October 1907, shortly after the end of the season, the University Football Club – which had won the Metropolitan Junior Football Association premiership that season – was admitted to the Victorian Football League as a senior club. This brought the size of the League to nine clubs, and the League delegates resolved at the same meeting to admit a tenth team, citing the desire to have an even number of teams to avoid the need for byes in the fixture, as well as some other strategic goals. The League resolved to reconvene on 18 October 1907 to select its tenth team from applications received in the interim. Within the next week, three Association clubs had announced their intention to apply for entry to the League: Richmond, and an amalgamation between North Melbourne and West Melbourne – as well as the Brighton Football Club, runners-up to University in the 1907 MJFA season.

Candidates

West Melbourne and North Melbourne were considered to be a stronger chance of gaining admission to the League as an amalgamated entity than as separate clubs, but in reality there were other drivers which would likely have seen the clubs merged for 1908 even without the opportunity to join the League. North Melbourne was struggling on the field, and West Melbourne was struggling financially. Furthermore, after years of sharing the North Melbourne Recreation Reserve as a home ground, West Melbourne had brokered a deal to play at the East Melbourne Cricket Ground, sharing it with the Essendon (League) Football Club in 1907; but, this deal was cancelled when University entered the League and assumed the co-tenancy of the ground, leaving West Melbourne homeless once again. North Melbourne and West Melbourne did share a strong history of collaboration as a result of proximity and sharing the same ground, and were seen as a natural fit for an amalgamation.

Richmond had been one of the Association's strongest and most consistent clubs on and off the field since the turn of the century, and was considered a very strong candidate for the tenth position in the League on those merits. Additionally, there were VFL delegates who sought for the League to strategically dominate Melbourne's inner-city locations, leaving the outer or suburban locations for the Association, and Richmond's location fit well with this vision.

Another club strongly rumoured to have been considering applying to join the League was the defending premiers Williamstown. Commentators thought Williamstown to be a strong candidate on its footballing merits, but that its remote location compared with the other inner-city teams was likely to limit its chances. Williamstown did not submit an application to the League, although whether it considered doing so is unknown.

Outcome

On 18 October 1907, the League formally accepted Richmond into its senior ranks from the 1908 season, and rejected the joint North Melbourne/West Melbourne application.

=== Association response ===
The Association reacted angrily to the League's actions, and to the clubs which attempted to defect. There was a feeling amongst many Association delegates that the League, by enticing its best senior clubs to defect and leaving a two-week opportunity for clubs to publicly fight for that position, was deliberately attempting to weaken and destabilise the Association just as it was building strength and popularity, to control a larger part of the money available in the game; and indeed, the popularity of the Association had been building in the previous few years, and in 1907 was the highest it had been since the original breakaway of the League in 1897.

Because of this, clubs which attempted to defect were seen by many in the Association as deeply disloyal – particularly Richmond and North Melbourne, who had themselves been through the suffering caused by the breakaway of the League in 1897. The Association discussed and ultimately carried a motion that any clubs which attempted to defect to the League would not be welcomed back to the Association. This left the unsuccessful applicants, North Melbourne and West Melbourne, without a senior competition for 1908.

=== Association expansion ===
Left with seven clubs, the Association looked to increase its numbers, and welcomed two of the strongest junior clubs in the city into its senior ranks: the Brighton Football Club from the Metropolitan Junior Football Association, and the Northcote Football Club from the Victorian Junior Football Association. This put the size of the Association at nine teams, and a fixture for the season was released in March 1908.

=== Re-admission of North Melbourne ===
Still without a senior competition in February 1908, North Melbourne and West Melbourne re-applied to join the League as an eleventh team, as a merged entity which would be known as the City Football Club, and would play its matches in North Melbourne, but they were again rejected. In March, they re-applied for the Association, but were again rejected for their disloyalty. At the end of March, both clubs were formally defunct.

Less than a week later, a new group of stakeholders from the town of North Melbourne set about reforming the club. At a public meeting on 15 April, the new North Melbourne Football Club was formed, and on 16 April it applied to join the Association. The Association accepted the application, after adding the condition that no person who served on the former committees of North Melbourne or West Melbourne could serve on the new committee, and accepting the assurances of the new committee that it was loyal to the Association.

The reformed club is historically viewed as a continuation of the previous North Melbourne club. The new club adopted blue and white halves with a red sash as its guernsey, borrowing colours from both North Melbourne (blue and white) and West Melbourne (red and white). With its re-admission occurring two weeks before the start of the season, North Melbourne was accommodated by playing its match each week against whichever team was scheduled for a bye.

== Rule changes ==
In a move which angered the Association, the League forbade Association matches from being played on League grounds in 1908 – a rule which followed West Melbourne's sharing of the East Melbourne Cricket Ground with Essendon (League) in 1907. The move strengthened the belief that the VFL's expansion and actions were aimed at undermining the increasing popularity of the Association.

The Association reduced the number of players on the field from eighteen-a-side to seventeen-a-side in 1908, removing one of the ruck/follower positions from the game.

== Premiership ==
The home-and-away season was played over eighteen rounds, with each club playing the others twice; then, the top four clubs contested a finals series under the amended Argus system to determine the premiers for the season.

=== Ladder ===
1908 VFA ladder
| Pos | Team | Pld | W | L | D | PF | PA | PP | Pts |
|---|---|---|---|---|---|---|---|---|---|
| 1 | Footscray (P) | 18 | 15 | 2 | 1 | 1086 | 683 | 159.0 | 62 |
| 2 | Essendon | 18 | 12 | 5 | 1 | 1154 | 715 | 161.4 | 50 |
| 3 | Williamstown | 18 | 12 | 6 | 0 | 1199 | 733 | 163.6 | 48 |
| 4 | Brunswick | 18 | 12 | 6 | 0 | 1150 | 887 | 129.7 | 48 |
| 5 | Prahran | 18 | 11 | 6 | 1 | 906 | 656 | 138.1 | 46 |
| 6 | Brighton | 18 | 8 | 10 | 0 | 1022 | 883 | 115.7 | 32 |
| 7 | Port Melbourne | 18 | 6 | 11 | 1 | 846 | 1071 | 79.0 | 26 |
| 8 | Preston | 18 | 4 | 13 | 1 | 887 | 1120 | 79.2 | 18 |
| 9 | North Melbourne | 18 | 4 | 14 | 0 | 631 | 1572 | 40.1 | 16 |
| 10 | Northcote | 18 | 3 | 14 | 1 | 689 | 1351 | 51.0 | 14 |

Rules for classification: 1) points; 2) percentage; 3) number of points for.
(P) Premiers

=== Finals ===
| | Semi-finals |
| Saturday, 22 August | Footscray 6.9 (45) | def. | Williamstown 4.6 (30) | North Melbourne Recreation Reserve (crowd: 12,000) |
| Saturday, 22 August | Essendon 5.7 (37) | def. by | Brunswick 5.16 (46) | Carlton Oval (crowd: 10,000) |

1908 VFA Final
Monday, 31 August | Footscray | def. | Brunswick | Melbourne Cricket Ground (crowd: 40,000–41,000)
1.2 (8); 3.4 (22); 6.5 (41); 9.10 (64) | Q1; Q2; Q3; Final | 2.0 (12); 4.0 (24); 5.3 (33); 6.4 (40) | Umpires: Lane
Launder 3, Cotton 2, Elliott 2, Sevior, Stewart | Goals | Pears 2, H. Braid, L. Braid, Chase, Johnson
Had Brunswick won, minor premiers Footscray would have been entitled to a rematch the following Saturday to decide the premiership.; The final was rescheduled from Saturday 29 August to Monday 31 August to avoid a clash with the Jubilee Carnival which was going on at the time.; The attendance, given in different sources as either 40,000 or 41,000, set a record for the highest crowd in Association history; this record stood until the 1939 Grand Final.

== Notable events ==
- From this season, Brunswick moved its home ground from Park Street Oval to Brunswick Park (present-day Gillon Oval) in Victoria Street.
- On 27 June, Footscray 28.20 (188) defeated North Melbourne 4.4 (28) by 160 points. Footscray's score set a new record for the highest in Association history. In the same game, Jack Hutchinson scored sixteen goals, also a new Association record.
