= Stewart McLatchie =

Australian rules footballer

Personal information
- Full name: Stewart McLatchie
- Born: 19 August 1896; Sale, Victoria
- Died: 31 January 1968 (aged 71); Cheltenham, Victoria
- Original team: Sale
- Height: 170 cm (5 ft 7 in)
- Weight: 69 kg (152 lb)

Playing career^{1}
Years	Club	Games (Goals)
1919–1924	Carlton	72 (103)
1925	Fitzroy	4 (4)
Total		76 (107)
- ^{1} Playing statistics correct to the end of 1925.

Stewart McLatchie, MM (19 August 1896 – 31 January 1968) was an Australian rules footballer who played with Carlton and Fitzroy in the Victorian Football League (VFL).

== Military service ==
McLatchie, a farmer from Sale, fought in World War I and was awarded a Military Medal for bravery.

== Football ==
He was first rover in the Carlton team that lost the 1921 VFL Grand Final to Richmond, by just four points.

A five-time VFL representative, McLatchie went to Fitzroy in 1925 but finished the season at Brunswick.

He was a member of Brunswick's 1925 premiership side.
