= Brunswick Football Club =

Former Australian rules football club

Names
- Full name: Brunswick-Broadmeadows Football Club
- Nickname(s): Pottery Workers, Brickfielders, Magpies, Wicks, Wickers, the Combine

Club details
- Founded: 1865; 161 years ago
- Dissolved: 1991; 35 years ago
- Colours: Black White
- Competition: Victorian Football Association (1897–1991)
- Premierships: VFA (3): 1909; 1925; 1938
- Ground: Gillon Oval

Uniforms
Home

The Brunswick Football Club, nicknamed the Magpies, was an Australian rules football club based in the Melbourne suburb of Brunswick.

Brunswick played in the Victorian Football Association (VFA) from 1897 until 1991, when it withdrew midway early in the season and folded shortly after. In its final two seasons in the VFA, the club was known as Brunswick-Broadmeadows.

== History ==
Brunswick Football Club was formed in 1865 and joined the VFA in the 1897 season.

The club was colloquially known in its early days as the Pottery Workers or the Brickfielders, and its fans were known for sounding clayhole bells at matches; after changing their colours from light blue and red colors to black and white, they became informally, and then later formally, known as the Magpies. They struggled to be competitive in the league early on, finishing last in 1898, 1899 and 1902.

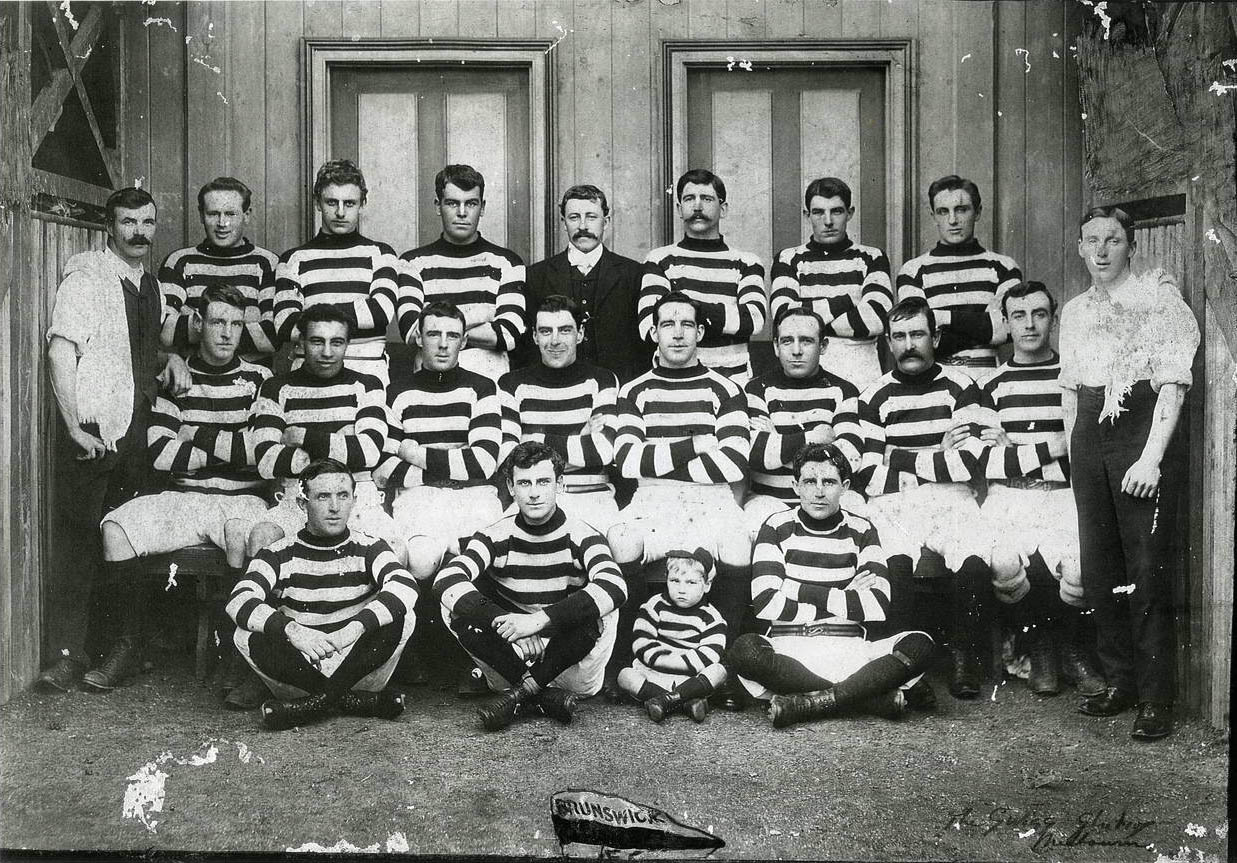
Brunswick FC side, 1909 premiers

They won the first of their three 1st division premierships in 1909 which started a successful era for the club under former Essendon player Jack McKenzie. Up until 1915 they played in six finals series and four grand finals.

After consistently making the finals following the end of the war they won another premiership in 1925. In 1926, the club dropped out of the Association near the end of the season in protest against suspensions meted out to captain-coach Wally Raleigh and team-mate Hassett, but was re-admitted prior to the 1927 season under an entirely new committee.

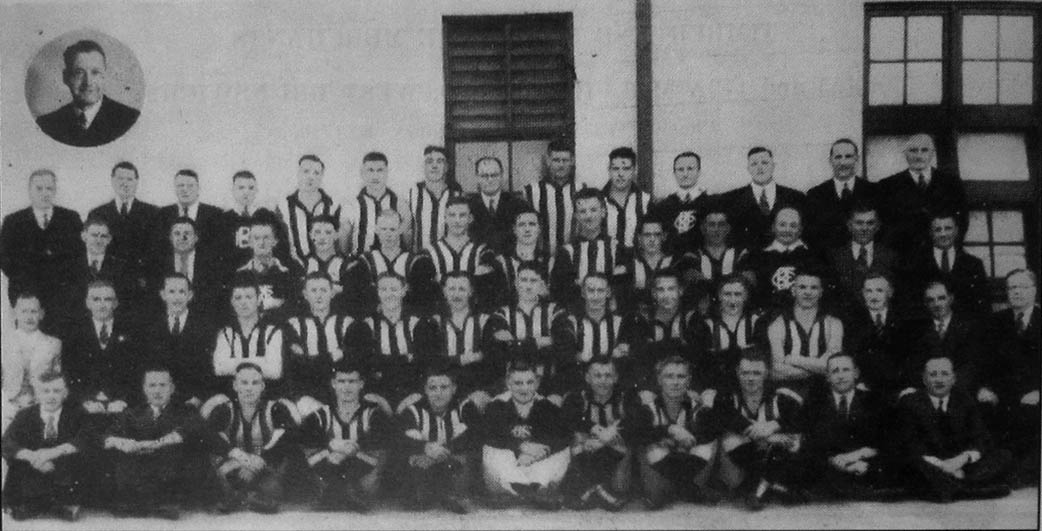
1938 team

They struggled during the early 1930s, both financially and on the field, forcing them to sell their finest players to Victorian Football League (VFL) clubs, but they went on to be one of the strongest teams of the late 1930s, winning three consecutive minor premierships from 1936–1938 and reaching three consecutive Grand Finals from 1937–1939. Their third and last first division premiership came during this period, defeating Brighton Football Club in the 1938 Grand Final by 33 points in what was the first premiership of the throw-pass era.

For the remaining fifty years of its time in the Association, Brunswick was consistently a middle-of-the-pack team. After the Association was partitioned into two divisions, Brunswick spent similar periods of time in both divisions; it was a regular finalist while in Division 2, winning three Division 2 premierships (1975, 1980 and 1985) from seven grand finals; but it seldom played finals in Division 1 and did not feature in a top division Grand Final after 1939.

Brunswick was one of several inner suburban VFA clubs whose off-field viability deteriorated through the late 1970s and early 1980s, in large part due to demographic shifts in the local area towards a higher migrant population which was largely uninterested in Australian rules football, and at different times the club was heavily in debt and appeared likely to fold. In October 1989, Brunswick entered into a merger with the Broadmeadows Football Club – which was a football club in an administrative capacity only, as it had a board of directors and enough local Broadmeadows support to have previously launched a bid to join the VFA, but it had no home ground nor a team active in any league – to form the Brunswick–Broadmeadows Football Club, which was still based in Brunswick. However, factional infighting between Brunswick and Broadmeadows members of the club's unwieldy 14-man board of directors distracted from any efforts to clear the club's debt (prompting the VFA to intervene and sack the board in August 1990), and the on-field position deteriorated dramatically after there was an exodus of 35 players in the 1990/91 offseason due to owing player payments; on 6 May 1991, after three enormous losses to start the 1991 season, the club withdrew from the VFA, and folded soon after.

== Club records ==
Highest Score	46.31 (307) v Sunshine, Round 12, 1983, Gillon Oval
Lowest Score	0.1 (1) v Williamstown, Round 10, 1897, Brunswick Park; 0.1 (1) v Footscray, Round 10, 1899, Western Oval
Greatest Winning Margin	275 points v Sunshine, Round 12, 1983, Gillon Oval
Greatest Losing Margin	187 points v Port Melbourne, Round 13, 1981, North Port Oval
Lowest Winning Score	3.3 (21) v North Melbourne 1.10 (16), Round 3, 1897, Brunswick Park
Highest Losing Score	24.15 (159) v Frankston 24.21 (165), Round 14, 1979, Frankston Park

=== Premierships ===
1st 18/Seniors

- 1909, 1925, 1938, 1975 (Div 2), 1980 (Div 2), 1985 (Div 2)

2nd 18/Reserves

- 1919 (Melbourne District FA), 1931 (VJFA), 1932, 1933, 1936, 1963(Div 1),1971(Div 2), 1972(Div 2), 1983(Div 2), 1984(Div 2), 1985(Div 2)

3rd 18/Under 19's

- 1956

== Seasons ==
Premiers	Grand Finalist	Minor premiers	Finals appearance	Wooden spoon	VFA/VFL leading goalkicker	VFA/VFL best and fairest

=== Seniors ===
Year	League	Finish	W	L	D	Coach	Captain	Best and fairest	Leading goalkicker	Goals	Ref
1897	VFA						Tom O'Loughlin				
1898	VFA						Tom O'Loughlin				
1899	VFA						Tom O'Loughlin				
1900	VFA						R. Coburn				
1901	VFA						R. Coburn				
1902	VFA						R. Coburn				
1903	VFA						R. Coburn				
1904	VFA						W. Stevenson				
1905	VFA						R. Casey				
1906	VFA						W. Temple				
1907	VFA						Henry Chase				
1908	VFA						Henry Chase				
1909	VFA					Jack McKenzie	Jack McKenzie		Henry Chase	39	
1910	VFA					Jack McKenzie	Jack McKenzie				
1911	VFA					Jack McKenzie	Jack McKenzie				
1912	VFA					Jack McKenzie	Leo Leeds				
1913	VFA					Jack McKenzie	Jack McKenzie				
1914	VFA					Jack McKenzie	Henry Chase				
1915	VFA						Henry Chase				
1916	VFA	(No season)									
1917	VFA	(No season)									
1918	VFA						Henry Chase				
1919	VFA						Henry Chase				
1920	VFA						Leo Sullivan				
1921	VFA						Leo Sullivan				
1922	VFA						Charlie Fisher				
1923	VFA						Barney Herbert				
1924	VFA						Dick O'Connor				
1925	VFA					Wally Raleigh	Wally Raleigh		Leo McInerney	79	
1926	VFA					Wally Raleigh	Wally Raleigh				
1927	VFA						Cyril Bright				
1928	VFA						Tom Hassett				
1929	VFA						Charlie Pannam		Leo McInerney	84	
1930	VFA						Hedley Blackmore				
1931	VFA						Charlie Pannam				
1932	VFA						Hedley Blackmore; Wal Warden				
1933	VFA						Wally Raleigh				
1934	VFA					Jim Jenkins	Jim Jenkins				
1935	VFA					Jim Jenkins	Jim Jenkins				
1936	VFA					Roy McKay	Roy McKay				
1937	VFA					Roy McKay	Roy McKay		Geoff McInnes	85	
1938	VFA					Roy McKay	Roy McKay	J. Dowling			
1939	VFA					Roy McKay	Roy McKay	H. Jones; R. Quinn			
1940	VFA					Roy McKay	Roy McKay	Col Crawford; J. Dowling			
1941	VFA					Col Crawford	Col Crawford				
1942	VFA	(No season)									
1943	VFA	(No season)									
1944	VFA	(No season)									
1945	VFA					Elton Plummer	Elton Plummer				
1946	VFA					Ron Baggott	Ron Baggott				
1947	VFA					Ron Baggott	Ron Baggott	R. Shaw			
1948	VFA					Ron Baggott	Ron Baggott				
1949	VFA					Ivor McIvor	Ivor McIvor	Ivor McIvor			
1950	VFA					Ivor McIvor	Ivor McIvor				
1951	VFA					Bervin Woods	Ray Priestley				
1952	VFA					Bervin Woods	Frank Nielsen				
1953	VFA					Jim Cleary	Frank Nielsen				
1954	VFA					Jim Cleary	Maurice Rolfs				
1955	VFA					Jim Cleary	Maurice Rolfs				
1956	VFA					Jim Cleary	Les Stanley				
1957	VFA					Jim Cleary	Leslie Pollard				
1958	VFA					Jim Cleary	Jack Edwards				
1959	VFA					Leslie Stanley	Bob McFarlane				
1960	VFA					Leslie Stanley	Jim Whiley				
1961	VFA (D1)					Ron Clegg	Ron Clegg				
1962	VFA (D1)					Ron Clegg	Jack Edwards				
1963	VFA (D1)					Wally Carter	Jim Whiley				
1964	VFA (D1)					Wally Carter	Jim Whiley	B. Wicks	Alan Cook	65	
1965	VFA (D1)					Keith Burns	Keith Burns				
1966	VFA (D1)					Keith Burns	Keith Burns				
1967	VFA (D1)					Keith Burns	Keith Burns				
1968	VFA (D1)					Keith Burns	Keith Burns				
1969	VFA (D1)					Jack Edwards	Graham Leydin				
1970	VFA (D2)					Jack Edwards	Alan Cook				
1971	VFA (D2)					Jack Edwards	Daryl O'Brien				
1972	VFA (D2)					Daryl O'Brien	Daryl O'Brien				
1973	VFA (D2)					Daryl O'Brien	Daryl O'Brien		Doug Baird	94	
1974	VFA (D2)					Jack Cuffe	Jack Wrout				
1975	VFA (D2)					Jack Cuffe	John Warden				
1976	VFA (D1)					Jack Cuffe	John Warden				
1977	VFA (D1)					Jack Cuffe	John Williams				
1978	VFA (D1)					Jack Cuffe	Barry Nolan	Barry Nolan			
1979	VFA (D1)					Ted Fitzell	George Stone				
1980	VFA (D2)					Barry Nolan	Barry Nolan				
1981	VFA (D1)					Barry Nolan	Barry Nolan				
1982	VFA (D2)					Barry Nolan	Barry Nolan				
1983	VFA (D2)					Barry Nolan	Barry Nolan				
1984	VFA (D2)					Barry Nolan	Malcolm Toy				
1985	VFA (D2)					Barry Nolan	Barry Nolan				
1986	VFA (D1)					Stephen Parsons	David Whillas	Tony West			
1987	VFA (D1)					Stephen Parsons	Tony West				
1988	VFA (D1)					Stephen Parsons	Tony West				
1989	VFA					Stephen Parsons	David Callander				
1990	VFA					Graham Leydin	David Callander				
1991	VFA	N/A (Note: Brunswick's three games in 1991 were expunged from the record.)	0	3	0	Graham Leydin	David Callander				

== Notable players ==
=== VFL ===
- Frank Anderson - Carlton
- Ron Baggott - Melbourne
- Hedley Blackmore - Carlton
- Lou Bols - Fitzroy
- Newton Chandler - Carlton
- Neil Clarke - Essendon
- Tom Clarke – Essendon
- Ron Clegg - South Melbourne
- Charles Clements – South Melbourne
- Ron De Iulio - Carlton
- Colin Dell - Footscray
- Frank Dimattina - Richmond & North Melbourne
- John Dowling - Melbourne
- Jack Edwards - North Melbourne
- Glenn Gingell - Footscray
- Keith Greig - North Melbourne
- Frank Gumbleton - North Melbourne
- Wayne Harmes played one season in 1989 after leaving Carlton
- Mark "Jacko" Jackson – Melbourne/St Kilda/Geelong/South Fremantle & entertainer
- Graeme Jenkin - Collingwood & Essendon
- Joe Kinnear – Melbourne
- Wally Lovett - Collingwood & Richmond
- Leo Maynes - Essendon/Fitzroy
- Robbie McGhie - Footscray, Richmond & South Melbourne
- Ivor McIvor - Essendon
- Jack McKenzie - Carlton
- Roy McKay – Footscray
- Stewart McLatchie – Carlton
- Alby Murdoch - Essendon
- Daryl O'Brien - North Melbourne
- Daryl Schimmelbusch - North Melbourne
- Wayne Schimmelbusch - North Melbourne
- Noel Smith – Essendon 1939 Gardiner Medal winner
- John Williams - Essendon & Collingwood
- Rodney Wright - North Melbourne & Melbourne

=== Other ===
- Barry Nolan – 1978 J. J. Liston Trophy winner
- Tony West – 1986 J. J. Liston Trophy winner
- John Curtin – Australian Prime Minister
- Ernest George – 1913 Stawell Gift winner
- Paul Young – 1985 Stawell Gift winner
- Bill Jacobs - 1960s Australian Cricket Team Manager and Football Radio Broadcaster (3AW - 1957 to 1991 including 25 grand finals)
- Alex Gillon – the longest serving VFA president #27 years from 1954 until 1981
