= Geelong Association Football Club =

Geelong

Names
- Full name: Geelong Football Club
- Nickname(s): Geelong A, Geelong Association

Club details
- Founded: 1922
- Colours: Navy blue White
- Competition: Victorian Football Association 1922–1927
- Ground: Kardinia Park; West Oval

Geelong (Association) Football Club was an Australian rules football club which played in the Victorian Football Association (VFA) from 1922 until 1927.

== History ==
In late 1921, the VFA granted the Geelong & District Junior Football Association permission to establish a new senior club to be admitted to the Association. The club was called the Geelong Football Club, and was typically referred to as Geelong (Association) or Geelong (A.) when it was necessary to distinguish it from the Geelong Football Club of the same name, which was affiliated with the Victorian Football League (VFL). The Association was keen to operate a club in Geelong, because it saw an opportunity to take a share of football support in the town which had been dominated by the League since the Geelong VFL club joined it 1897.

At the time there, were two high-quality football venues in Geelong: Corio Oval, was used by the Geelong VFL club, and the newly upgraded Kardinia Park, into which the new Geelong VFA club moved. The VFA club wore purple and gold in its first season, before switching to the same navy blue and white hoops worn by the Geelong VFL team.

The club spent six years in the competition, but with a playing list composed primarily of junior players, it never achieved much on-field success. Its best result was a win–loss record of 4–14 (achieved twice), and it won three wooden spoons.

By 1925, the club was struggling off-field as well as on-field. It nearly folded at the administrative level during the 1925 season – under which a new and independent committee would have taken over the playing list left behind – but the existing administration remained, and in 1926, the club moved from Kardinia Park to the Western Oval in West Geelong.

By 1927, Geelong had become a financial burden to the rest of the Association. The team was not well supported, so its crowd numbers were the lowest in the Association, with an average gate of only £18 per game in its final year. After venue expenses were deducted, there was little left for the visiting clubs, who were then forced to cover the cost of travel to Geelong. Consequently, the Association excluded Geelong from its senior ranks after the 1927 season, opting to admit Yarraville in its place.
