= Arden Street Oval =

Sports venue in North Melbourne, Victoria

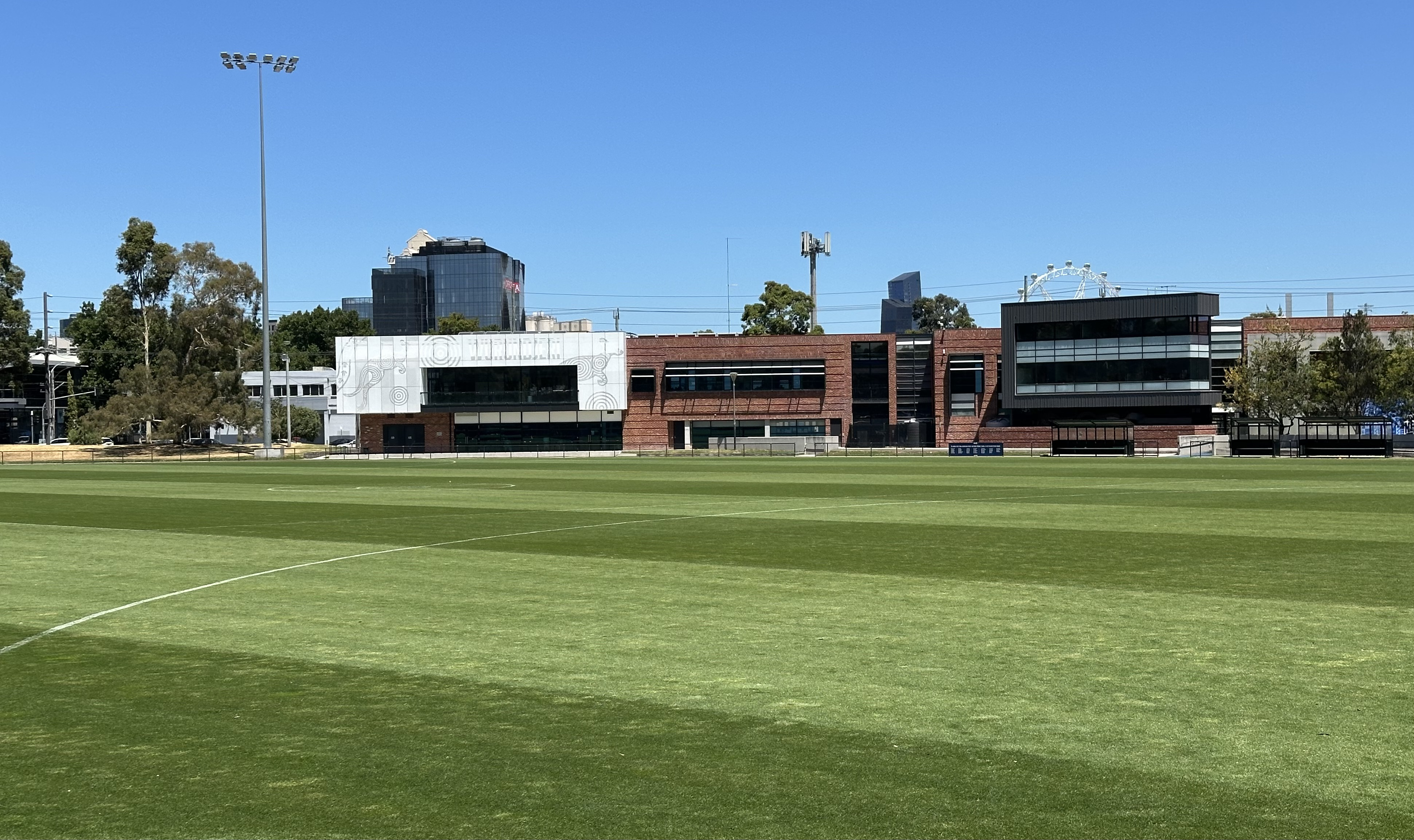
- Interactive map of Arden Street Oval
- Address: 204-206 Arden Street; North Melbourne, Victoria
- Coordinates: 37.798637°S 144.94155°E
- Owner: Melbourne City Council
- Capacity: 4,000
- Surface: Grass
- Record attendance: 35,116 (27 August 1949)

Construction
- Groundbreaking: 1850s
- Opened: 1850s
- Cost: A$16M (redevelopment)
- Architect: Williams Ross Architects

Tenants
- North Melbourne Football Club; Administration & Training (1882–present) (Note: Excluding 1965.); VFA/VFL/AFL (1882–1985); AFLW (2018–present); VFL (2018–present); VFLW (2021–present); Other tenants North Melbourne Cricket Club (1868–2008); Irish Hurling (1930s); Melb. Greyhound Racing Association (1957–1962)

Arden Street Oval (also known as the North Melbourne Recreation Reserve) is an Australian rules football venue located in North Melbourne. It has been the home base of the North Melbourne Football Club in the Australian Football League (AFL) near-continuously since 1882.

North Melbourne played home matches at Arden Street Oval in the Victorian Football Association (VFA) from the 1882 season until moving to the VFL (now AFL) in 1925, where it continued playing at the ground until the end of 1985. Since 2018, North Melbourne has played its AFL Women's (AFLW), Victorian Football League (VFL) and VFL Women's (VFLW) home matches at the venue.

== History ==
Arden Street Oval was officially secured from the Hotham/North Melbourne Cricket Club from the Government who handed over the parcel of land to the Hotham Cricket Club in 1873 or 1874. The Hotham Cricket Club was the only club to use the ground until 1882, when it amalgamated with the Hotham Football Club to effect improvements to the ground.

Before then, the Hotham Football Club had been playing home matches at Royal Park, near the present site of the Melbourne Zoo, as early as 1859 in the form of the embryonic Hothamites football playing club. The first game of Australian football ever played at the Arden Street ground took place on 29 April 1882, when Hotham defeated Royal Park. Three years later, the ground became permanently reserved to the Crown.

The Hotham Football Club changed its name back to North Melbourne on the 31st March 1888 after the Town of Hotham reverted to the name of North Melbourne in August 1887. The cricket club followed suit.

Arden St in 1980. The 1928 Grandstand is to the North. Betting ring in the North-West. Harold Henderson Pavilion to the west. Outer sheds to the South and East

The playing surface, notorious for becoming a gluepot in inclement weather, was upgraded during the winter of 1897, so no football was played there during that season. 1906 saw the construction of the ground's first grandstand. By mid-1909, the control of the Recreation Reserve had shifted to the Parks and Gardens Committee of the Melbourne City Council, meaning that the State Minister for Lands had final say over the use of the reserve. In 1921, the Essendon Football Club attempted to move to the ground after its home ground, the East Melbourne Cricket Ground, was closed, and the North Melbourne Football Club disbanded as it sought to amalgamate with Essendon; but the State Minister for Lands vetoed Essendon's move. This prompted Essendon to move to the Essendon Recreation Reserve, and the re-formed North Melbourne returned the following season to Arden Street.

In 1922, management of the ground was transferred from the Melbourne City Council to the North Melbourne Football and Cricket Clubs. Improvements to the ground that year, made in an attempt to increase revenue, included the installation of hot showers in the change rooms.

In early 1925, North Melbourne was admitted to the Victorian Football League (VFL). The invitation to join the VFL came at a time when local support for the club was at an all-time high, prompting further upgrading of facilities. This included the construction of the main grandstand in 1928, with seating for 2,000 spectators.

In 1965, North Melbourne moved its playing and training base from the Arden Street Oval to Coburg Oval. The move was intended to be permanent, with some initial negotiations seeking long-term leases for up to 40 years, but it was ultimately cancelled after only eight months, and North Melbourne returned to the Arden Street Oval in 1966.

Until the late 1960s, the 1906 and 1928 grandstands were the only major structures associated with the Recreation Reserve. The new administration building and Social Club were built after 1966.

The North Melbourne Football Club continued to use the site as its home ground until 1985, when the club began using the Melbourne Cricket Ground for its home matches. The last VFL match was played there on 17 August 1985 when North Melbourne defeated Richmond by 50 points. The record attendance at the ground is 35,116 in 1949. The highest score was North Melbourne's 29.19 (193) in 1983 versus Carlton.

The club continued to maintain the Arden Street Oval as a training and administrative base after shifting home games away. From 2002 until 2010, the club based its administration in offices at Docklands Stadium (which was then serving as its home ground), before returning to upgraded Arden Street Oval offices in early 2010; but it has maintained Arden Street as its training base continuously throughout that time.

In 2006 the ground became the subject of an arson attack, with several portable buildings including the gymnasium, coaches' offices and players' lounge destroyed by fire in the early hours of 22 July, the morning after the Kangaroos suffered a 72-point loss to the Adelaide Crows at Football Park. Links between the attack, the team's loss and speculation surrounding its future were quickly dismissed.

== Ground improvements ==
=== First grandstand ===
The first grandstand was built in 1906 on the Fogarty Street side of the ground, at a reputed cost of £850. It helped to grow North Melbourne Football Club supporter base, whereby a record crowd for the club was reached in 1910, when 28,000 people watched North Melbourne play Brunswick in a VFA final held at Arden Street Oval. Remnants of this stand, the concrete players’ race and the base of one of the external staircases, remain in the terraced area. The players’ race still connects the players’ dressing rooms in the Football Club administration building with the oval. In 1909, plans for a new grandstand, to cost £1,000, were drawn up by local councillor and a leading figure as one the clubs leaders in its founding years, J H Gardiner, born John Gardiner, but not built until 1928 and at a cost of £11,000.

=== 1928 grandstand ===
1928 Grandstand

North Melbourne's move to the VFL in 1925 prompted significant upgrading of the club's facilities. Symbolic of the club's new status as a member of the VFL was the construction of the brick grandstand in 1928, with seating for 2,000 spectators. Located to the south-east of the existing 1906 stand, it was built on the site of the small timber pavilion, which was demolished, and another even smaller structure to the south-east which was apparently re-located elsewhere. The designer was H E Morton and the builder was J E Morison.

The foundation stone reads as follows:
NORTH MELBOURNE RECREATION RESERVE
THIS TABLET WAS UNVEILED BY THE
RIGHT HONORABLE THE LORD MAYOR OF MELBOURNE
ALDERMAN SIR STEPHEN MORELL
ON SATURDAY 24TH MARCH 1928
COMMITTEE 1927–28 COUNCILLOR DR KENT HUGHES, CHAIRMAN
L. W. ABLEY REV. D. DALEY
A. J. HARFORD J. T. EDMONDS
C. W. LETTEY J. P. T. MORAN
G. P. RUSSELL W. J. WOODBRIDGE
R. ROUTLEY, J. C. CONNOLEY,
SECRETARY TREASURER
H. E. MORTON, J. C. MORISON,
ENGINEER BUILDER

The main grandstand seated prominent members and administrators of the football club up until the club stopped playing games there in 1984. From then on, it fell into disrepair and was eventually closed off to the public in 1991. It housed the club gym for a few years before bird droppings inside the roof began to present a safety hazard. The grandstand was eventually demolished in 2006 after failed attempts to find funds to repair the structure, much to the disappointment of the North-West Melbourne Association. A new administration and football facility was built in its place.

=== Harold R. Henderson Pavilion ===
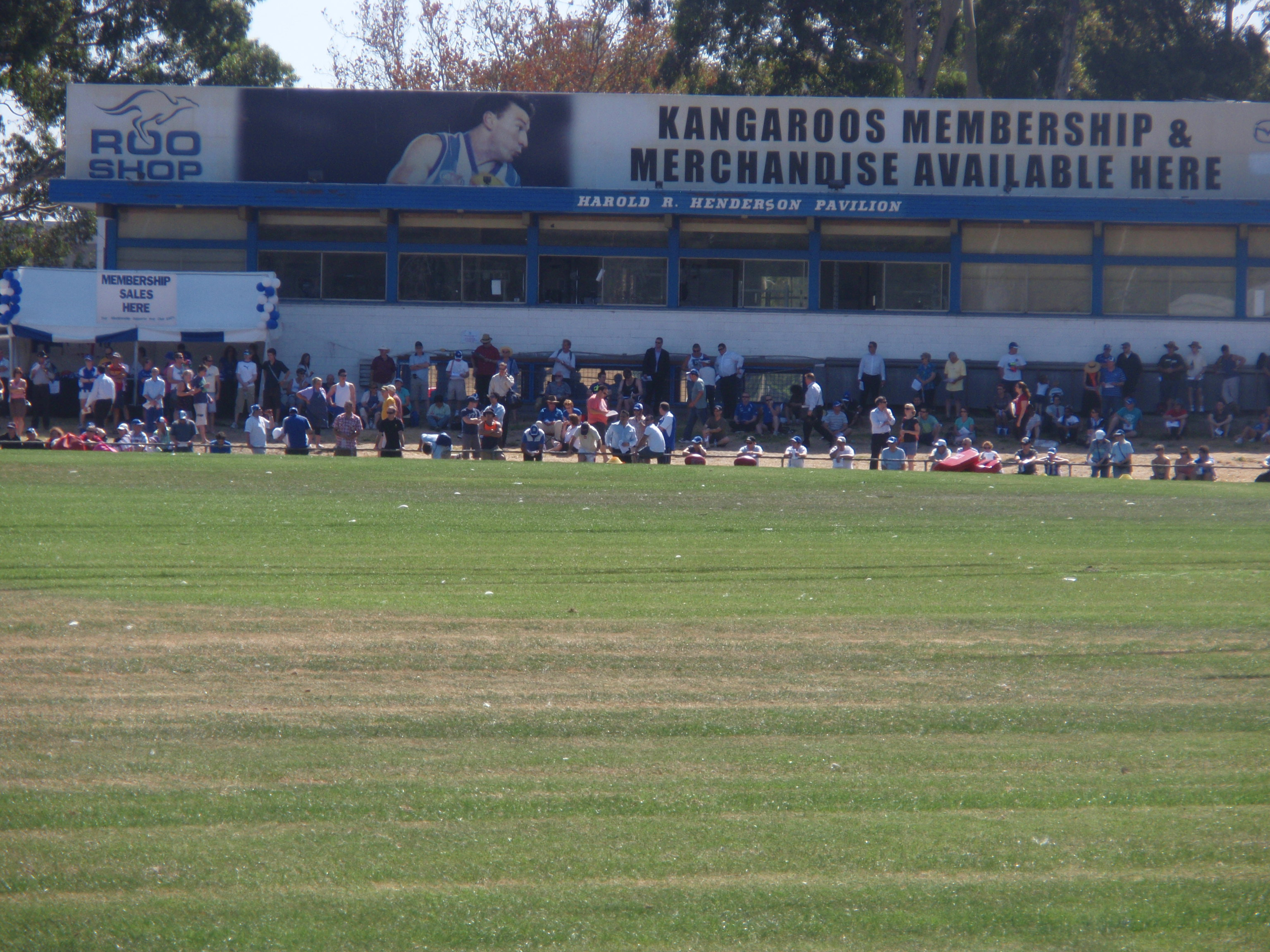
Harold Henderson Pavilion

The Harold R. Henderson Pavilion was the latest stand to be built. It was constructed in the late '60s following the club's disastrous move to the Coburg City Oval. Led by Allen Aylett and Harold R. Henderson, a committee was formed that aimed to redevelop the ground so that there would never be a repeat of the club's relocation to Coburg. Along with new administration facilities, a new first rate social club was built that became the envy of other VFL clubs during the 70s.

The pavilion itself set a new benchmark in football standards, with the introduction of corporate hospitality where clients could enjoy the football in comfort. These improvements were responsible for the great success North achieved during the 70s.

After 1985, the Pavilion was converted into the 'Kanga Kasino' that housed the clubs pokie machines. In 2002, North Melbourne acquired the Captain's Bar at the newly constructed Docklands Stadium, and the pokies were moved there. From 2002 until 2009, the Pavilion held the club gym and North Melbourne's official merchandise store, the 'Roo Shop'.

The Pavilion was demolished in 2009 as part of the development of the oval.

=== Betting ring ===
The betting ring was a concreted area beneath a roof, behind the 1928 grandstand, on the corner of Arden and Fogarty streets. The betting ring was built for greyhound racing meetings that were held at Arden St from 1957 to 1962. The dogs ran on a track that formed a perimeter around the cricket oval. While the betting ring was alive with punters and bookmakers, only those in the ring's top corner, at the northern end, had a view past the grandstand and across the terraces to the finishing line. After the demise of greyhound racing at Arden Street, the betting ring served as a car park and equipment shelter. Much of the area was taken up by the Bob Dempster Memorial Nets, which were built on the oval in 1975, before being shifted to the corner of the betting ring closest to the intersection of Arden and Fogarty streets.

In 2006, the betting ring was destroyed in an arson attack.

=== Outer shed ===
At the eastern goals, and along the Macaulay Street boundary, stood small shelters for the spectators. These shelters were demolished in the aftermath of the 1985 Bradford City stadium fire in England, when the Metropolitan Fire Brigade declared them a fire hazard.

== The Gasometer ==
Gasometer

One of the iconic features of VFL football at Arden Street was the gigantic gasometer that towered over the ground. The giant gas works structure was located along Macaulay Road and became synonymous with North Melbourne in the football world.

The gasometer was so well known that Mick Nolan was affectionately labelled the "Galloping Gasometer" by footy fans due to his large size and apparent resemblance to the structure.

== Tenants ==
Apart from its aborted move to Coburg in 1965, and times when the ground was being upgraded, Arden Street Oval has served as the permanent home of the North Melbourne Football Club since 1882. Apart from this, boxing, cricket, cycling, fencing, hurling and greyhound racing have all been accommodated at Arden Street Oval at some stage.

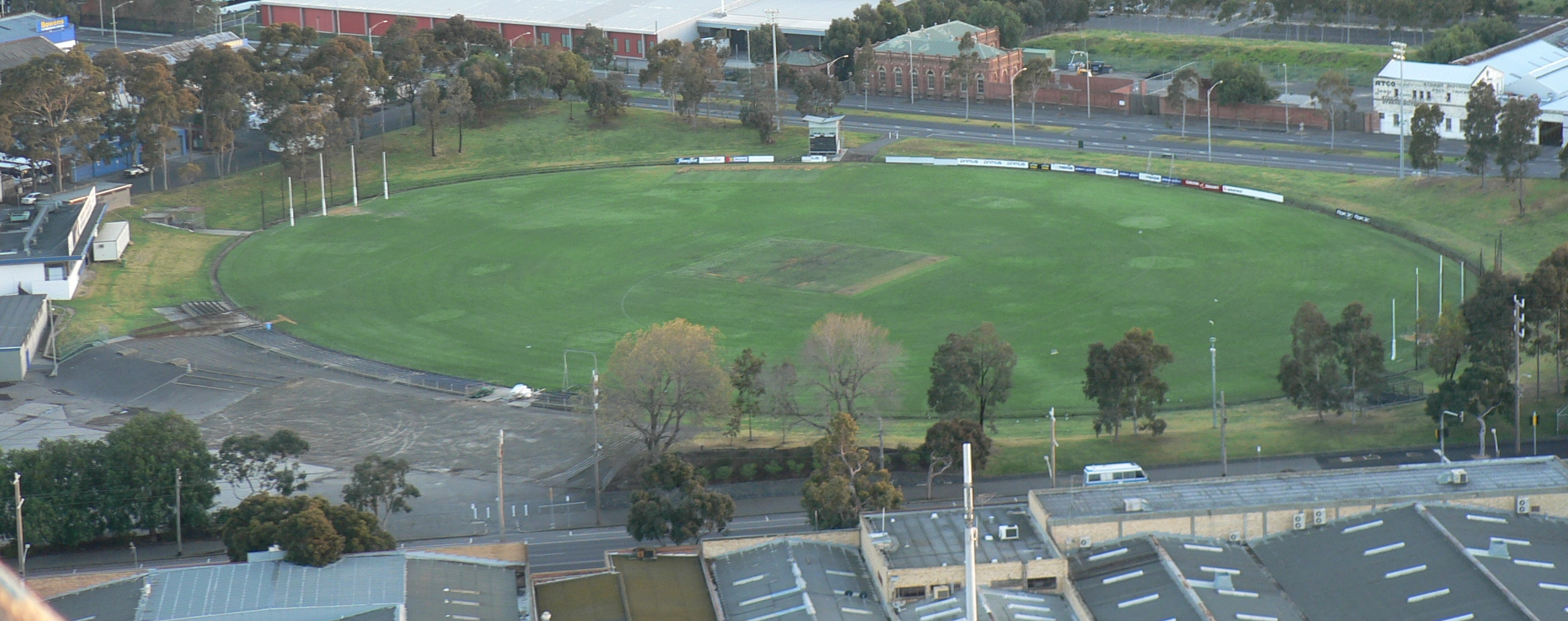
Arden Street Oval from the air in 2007 with the Henderson Pavillion and 1928 grandstand demolished in advance of the oval's renovation

The original tenant of the oval was the North Melbourne Cricket Club. The cricket club first started playing at the ground in 1868. The cricket club began to share the oval with the football club in 1882, with the football club using the oval in winter, and the cricket club using the oval in the summer. Historically this arrangement has been difficult and the North Melbourne cricket and football clubs have not got along. In 2007, the cricket club moved its First and Second XIs playing base to J. J. Holland Park in neighbouring Kensington, but its Third and Fourth XIs remained at Arden Street; the club left Arden Street altogether in 2010, playing and training nomadically at Holland Park, Albert Park and Royal Park for a couple of years before moving permanently to the outer north-western suburb of Greenvale in 2013.

From 1957 until 1962, the Melbourne Greyhound Racing Association used Arden Street to hold its greyhound racing meetings. The greyhounds ran on a track that formed a perimeter around the oval. Races were held on Monday nights and regularly attracted crowds of 5000, with double that number in attendance on the night when Rookie Rebel won the first Australian Cup in 1958. The Arden Street days are described as being the best in the history of Melbourne greyhound racing. Melbourne Greyhound Racing Association shifted its meetings to Olympic Park in 1962 after the Arden Street's ground committee sought to cash in on the popularity of the dogs by increasing the annual rent from £7,000 to £9,500.

In the winter of 1965, after North Melbourne had moved to Coburg, Arden Street Oval was rented by the VFL – in large part to prevent other football codes from renting it. The VFL used it junior football, umpire training, school programs, and from June it was used as a central ground for the Essendon District Football League game-of-the-week.

== Redevelopment ==
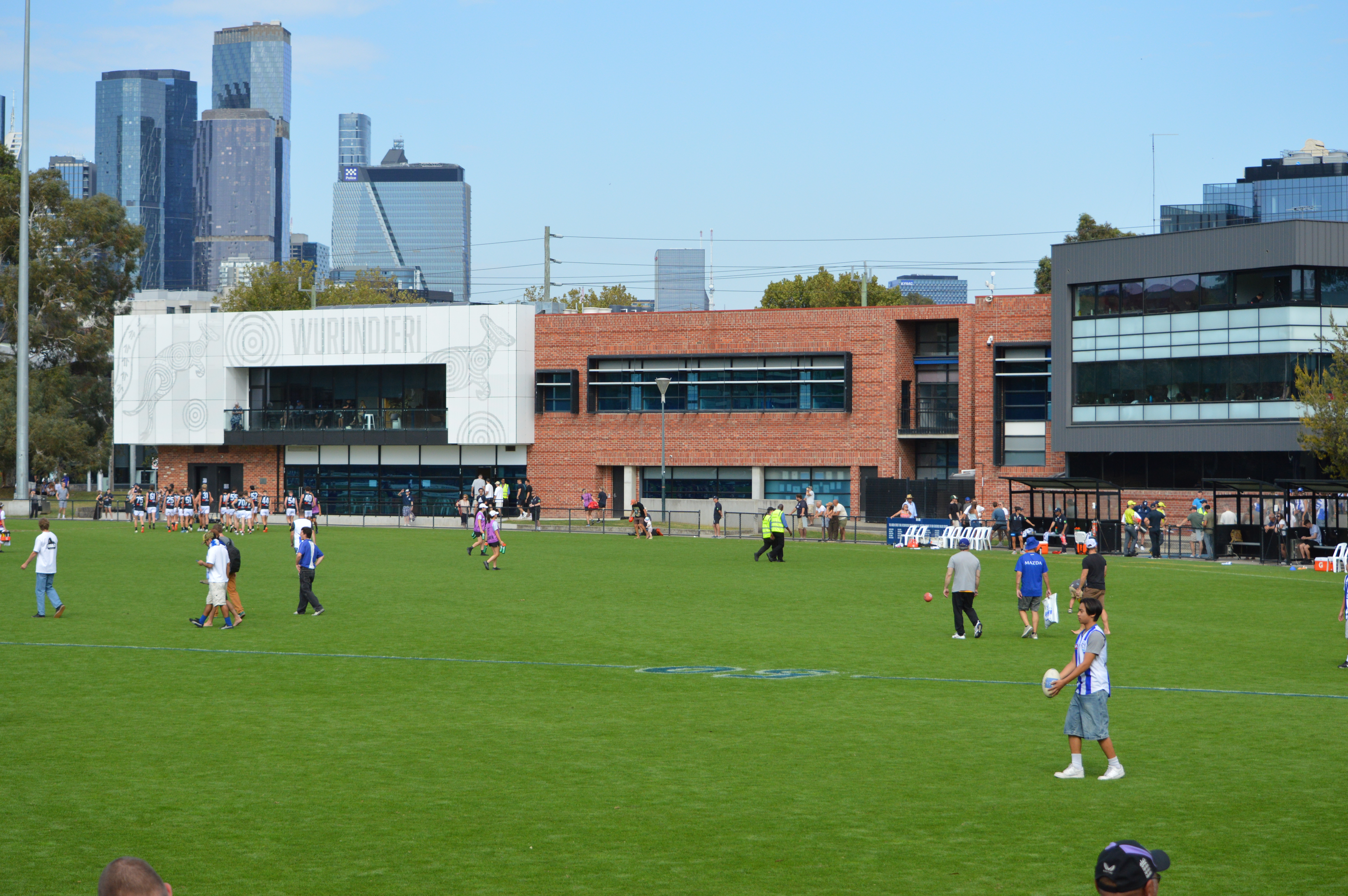
View of the oval's redeveloped administrative and training facilities in 2025

In 2007, North Melbourne chairman Graham Duff announced that the facilities at the Arden Street Oval would get a $10 million upgrade, including new facilities for the State Fencing Centre. The new facilities would be ready in time for the 2009 AFL Season and allow the club to move administration from Etihad Stadium to the ground. The upgraded facilities will also serve the community with a Gymnasium, Basketball Courts and Change rooms.

The new administration of James Brayshaw worked with various Government agencies including the Melbourne City Council, Victorian State Government, and the Commonwealth Government to have the new facilities increased in size and value from the original $10 million, to a final plan costing $16 million, and providing the NMFC and local community with some of the best amenities of any club in the AFL.

The new development was opened in time for the 2010 season. The development includes offices for the football department and administration of the NMFC as well as training facilities. As housed in the building is a fencing centre, community gym, basketball court and 'The Huddle' which is a community learning centre.
