= 1913 VFA season =

Overview
- Date: 26 April – 6 September 1913
- Teams: 10
- Premiers: Footscray; 5th premiership
- Minor premiers: Footscray; 3rd minor premiership
- Leading goalkicker: Thornton Clarke; Essendon – 58 goals)

The 1913 VFA season was the 37th season of the Victorian Football Association (VFA), an Australian rules football competition played in the state of Victoria. The season began on 26 April and concluded on 6 September, comprising an 18-match home-and-away season, followed by a three-week finals series.

The premiership was won by the Footscray Football Club, after it defeated North Melbourne by one point in the 1913 VFA Final. It was the club's fifth VFA premiership.

== Home-and-away season ==
The home-and-home season was played over eighteen rounds, with each club playing the others twice; then, the top four clubs contested a finals series under the amended Argus system to determine the premiers for the season.

=== Round 1 ===
	Round 1
Saturday, 26 April (2:10 pm)	Brunswick 11.32 (98)	def.	Port Melbourne 5.10 (40)	Brunswick Park
Saturday, 26 April (2:10 pm)	Northcote 4.11 (35)	def. by	Essendon 8.12 (60)	Croxton Park
Saturday, 26 April (2:10 pm)	North Melbourne 10.15 (75)	def.	Melbourne City 4.7 (31)	Arden Street Oval
Saturday, 26 April (2:10 pm)	Footscray 8.6 (54)	def.	Williamstown 5.5 (35)	Western Oval
Saturday, 26 April (2:10 pm)	Prahran 15.15 (105)	def.	Brighton 5.15 (45)	Toorak Park

=== Round 2 ===
	Round 2
Sunday, 3 May (2:10 pm)	Essendon 9.8 (62)	def. by	North Melbourne 11.12 (78)	Windy Hill
Sunday, 3 May (2:10 pm)	Williamstown 7.18 (60)	def.	Northcote 5.7 (37)	Williamstown Cricket Ground
Sunday, 3 May (2:10 pm)	Melbourne City 7.3 (45)	def. by	Prahran 14.16 (100)	East Melbourne Cricket Ground
Sunday, 3 May (2:10 pm)	Port Melbourne 4.9 (33)	def. by	Footscray 10.17 (77)	North Port Oval
Sunday, 3 May (2:10 pm)	Brighton 9.7 (61)	def. by	Brunswick 8.20 (68)	Brighton Beach Oval

== Ladder ==
Pos	Team	Pld	W	L	D	PF	PA	PP	Pts
1	Footscray (P)	18	14	4	0	1209	778	155.4	56
2	North Melbourne	18	13	4	1	1317	943	139.7	54
3	Essendon	18	13	5	0	1154	966	119.5	52
4	Brunswick	18	12	5	1	1262	959	131.6	50
5	Williamstown	18	12	6	0	1082	876	123.5	48
6	Prahran	18	10	8	0	1214	962	126.2	40
7	Brighton	18	5	13	0	1037	1278	81.1	20
8	Port Melbourne	18	5	13	0	984	1260	78.1	20
9	Northcote	18	5	13	0	957	1328	72.1	20
10	Melbourne City	18	0	18	0	680	1552	43.8	0

Rules for classification: 1) points; 2) percentage; 3) number of points for.
(P) Premiers

== Finals ==
=== Semi-finals ===
	Semi-finals
Saturday, 23 August	Footscray 7.13 (55)	def.	Essendon 8.5 (53)	Melbourne Cricket Ground (crowd: 13,000)
Saturday, 30 August	North Melbourne 8.16 (64)	def.	Brunswick 4.2 (26)	East Melbourne Cricket Ground (crowd: 16,500)

=== Final ===
1913 VFA Final
Saturday, 6 September	Footscray	def.	North Melbourne	East Melbourne Cricket Ground (crowd: 20,000)
4.2 (26); 7.10 (52); 8.13 (61); 10.14 (74)	Q1; Q2; Q3; Final	3.4 (22); 6.4 (40); 10.6 (66); 11.7 (73)	Umpires: Hurley
Banbury 3, Grierson 2, Baxter, Cotton, Gregory, Holmes, Lawson	Goals	Carpenter 2, Freeman 2, Hardy 2, Hawkins 2, K. Johnson, McKay, Treloar
Harris (ankle)	Injuries
Had North Melbourne won, minor premiers Footscray would have been entitled to a rematch the following Saturday to decide the premiership.

== Notable events ==
- On June 9, Melbourne City lost to Port Melbourne despite having thirteen more scoring shots, by the score 4.24 (48) def. by 8.7 (55). The seven-point loss was the closest Melbourne City came to winning a match in its two years in the Association.
