= 1914 VFA season =

Overview
- Teams: 10
- Premiers: North Melbourne; 4th premiership
- Minor premiers: North Melbourne; 3rd minor premiership
- Leading goalkicker: Tom Clarke (Essendon − 46 goals)

The 1914 VFA season was the 38th season of the Victorian Football Association (VFA), an Australian rules football competition played in the state of Victoria.

The premiership was won by the North Melbourne Football Club, after it defeated Footscray by 35 points in the final on 22 August. It was the club's fourth VFA premiership, and marked the beginning of a period of unprecedented dominance for North Melbourne, which included three consecutive premierships and a 58-match winning streak which lasted from 1914 to 1919.

== Association membership ==
In October 1913, the Hawthorn Football Club submitted an application to join the Association and leave the Metropolitan Amateur Football Association (MAFA). The application was accepted in December, after the Melbourne City Football Club, having endured two winless seasons since joining the Association in 1912, disbanded. As such, the size of the Association remained constant at ten clubs.

== Home-and-away season ==
The home-and-home season was played over eighteen rounds, with each club playing the others twice; then, the top four clubs contested a finals series under the amended Argus system to determine the premiers for the season.

Starting from 1914, percentage in the Association was calculated as the number of points conceded for every 100 points scored. Where level on premiership points, clubs were ranked in ascending order by percentage. Previously (and again later) percentage was calculated as the number of points scored for every 100 points conceded.

== Ladder ==
1914 VFA ladder
Pos	Team	Pld	W	L	D	PF	PA	PP	Pts
1	North Melbourne (P)	18	14	4	0	1389	873	62.9	56
2	Footscray	18	14	4	0	1222	864	70.7	56
3	Essendon	18	12	6	0	1331	1053	79.1	48
4	Williamstown	18	11	7	0	1084	1045	96.4	44
5	Brunswick	18	9	8	1	1246	1106	88.8	38
6	Prahran	18	8	8	2	1120	1117	99.7	36
7	Brighton	18	9	9	0	1024	1027	100.3	36
8	Port Melbourne	18	7	11	0	1165	1311	112.5	28
9	Hawthorn	18	3	14	1	1145	1629	142.3	14
10	Northcote	18	1	17	0	757	1581	208.9	4

Rules for classification: 1) points; 2) percentage; 3) number of points for.
(P) Premiers

== Finals ==
=== Semi-finals ===
	Semi-finals
Saturday, 8 August	North Melbourne 13.11 (89)	def.	Essendon 8.10 (58)	Melbourne Cricket Ground (crowd: 15,000)
Saturday, 8 August	Footscray 13.12 (90)	def.	Williamstown 5.6 (36)	East Melbourne Cricket Ground (crowd: 7,000)

=== Final ===
1914 VFA Final
Saturday, 22 August	North Melbourne	def.	Footscray	East Melbourne Cricket Ground (crowd: 10,000)
1.3 (9); 6.10 (46); 9.13 (67); 12.14 (86)	Q1; Q2; Q3; Final	2.2 (14); 4.2 (26); 5.5 (35); 7.9 (51)	Umpires: McMurray
Moran 5, Hardy 3, Miles 2, Carpenter, Hawkins	Goals	Banbury 2, Baxter 2, Cotton 2, Crouch
Had Footscray won, minor premiers North Melbourne would have been entitled to a rematch the following Saturday to decide the premiership.

== Awards ==
- Tom Clarke (Essendon) was the leading goalkicker for the season, with 46 (including finals).
