= 1907 VFA season =

Australian rules football competition in Victoria

1907 premiership season
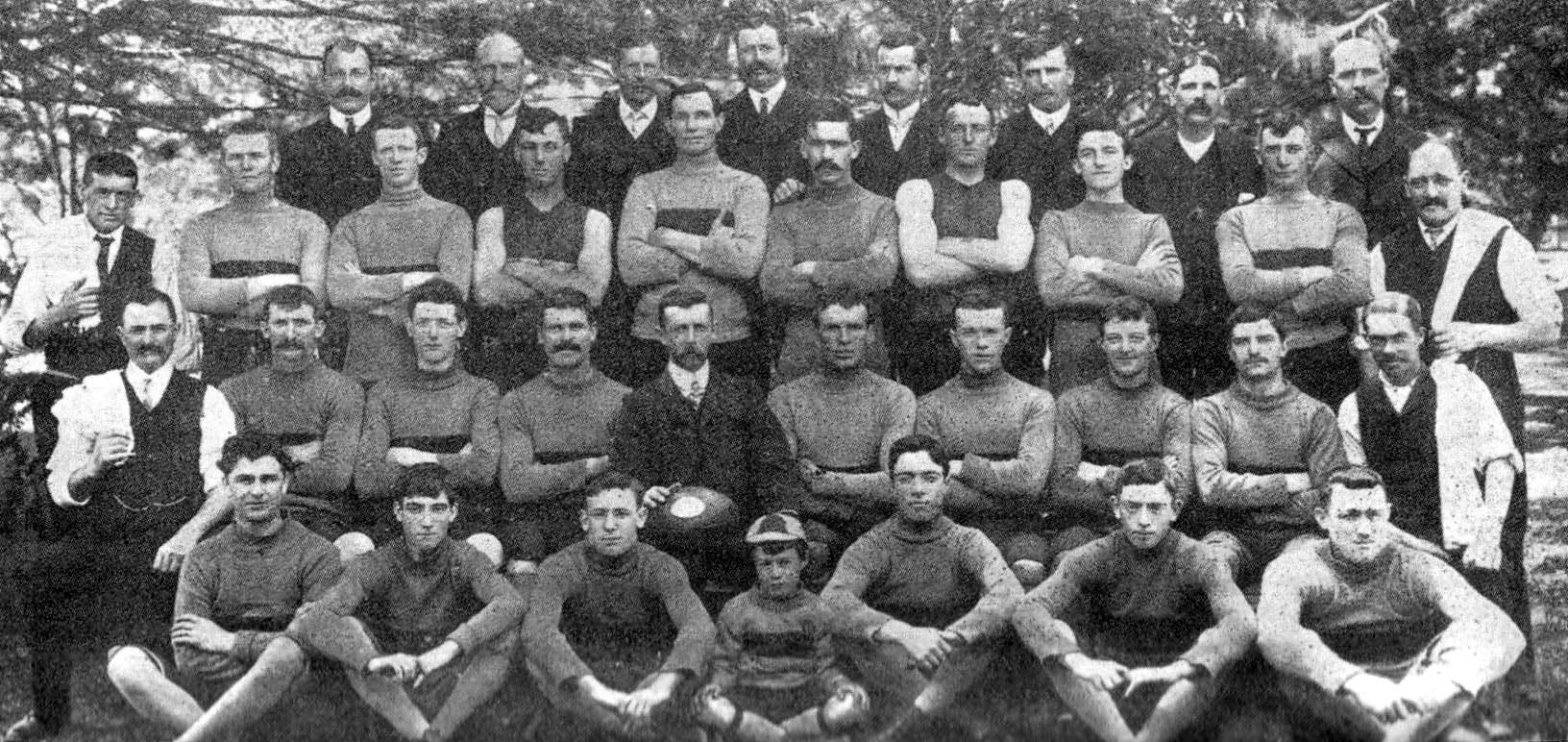
- Williamstown FC, premiers
- Teams: 10
- Premiers: Williamstown; 1st premiership
- Minor premiers: Williamstown; 1st minor premiership

The 1907 Victorian Football Association season was the 31st season of the Australian rules football competition. The premiership was won by the Williamstown Football Club, after it defeated West Melbourne in the final by eighteen points. It was the first premiership won by Williamstown, in its 24th season of senior competition.

== Premiership ==
The home-and-away season was played over eighteen rounds, with each club playing the others twice; then, the top four clubs contested a finals series under the amended Argus system to determine the premiers for the season.

=== Ladder ===
1907 VFA ladder
Pos	Team	Pld	W	L	D	PF	PA	Pts
1	Williamstown (P)	18	15	3	0	1046	653	60
2	Richmond	18	14	4	0	1387	773	56
3	Footscray	18	12	6	0	1006	708	48
4	West Melbourne	18	12	6	0	1048	813	48
5	Essendon	18	11	7	0	900	760	44
6	Brunswick	18	9	9	0	1077	1007	36
7	Port Melbourne	18	9	9	0	814	1007	36
8	Prahran	18	5	13	0	806	1202	20
9	North Melbourne	18	2	16	0	618	1179	8
10	Preston	18	1	17	0	586	1329	4

Rules for classification: 1) points; 2) percentage; 3) number of points for.
(P) Premiers

=== Finals ===
==== Semi-finals ====
	Semi Finals
Saturday, 14 September	Williamstown 5.11 (41)	def.	Footscray 3.9 (27)	East Melbourne Cricket Ground (crowd: 12,000)
Saturday, 21 September	Richmond 5.7 (37)	def. by	West Melbourne 8.13 (61)	East Melbourne Cricket Ground (crowd: 7,500)

==== 1907 Final ====
1907 VFA Final
Saturday, 28 September	Williamstown	def.	West Melbourne	East Melbourne Cricket Ground (crowd: 25,000)
4.4 (28); 4.5 (29); 5.9 (39); 7.10 (52)	Q1; Q2; Q3; Final	0.2 (2); 2.6 (18); 2.9 (21); 3.16 (34)	Umpires: Hurley
Briggs 3, Addison 2, Gibbs 2	Goals	P. Johnson 2, Armstrong
Had West Melbourne won, minor premiers Williamstown would have been entitled to a rematch the following Saturday to decide the premiership.

== Notable events ==
=== Interleague matches ===
The Association played two interstate games against the South Australia (represented by the SAFL) during the year. In the first, the Association team fought back from a late three goal deficit to score 3.5 (23) in a row and take a five point lead; but, in the final passage of play, a South Australian rebound led to a mark by Alby Bahr, who kicked a goal after the final bell to win the game for South Australia. The Association won the return game by eleven points.

	1907 Interleague Matches
Saturday, 8 June	V.F.A. 13.14 (92)	def. by	S.A.F.L. 14.9 (93)	East Melbourne Cricket Ground (crowd: 11,000)
Saturday, 27 July	S.A.F.L. 6.11 (47)	def. by	V.F.A. 9.4 (58)	Adelaide Oval (crowd: 9,000)

=== Other notable events ===
- West Melbourne moved its home base from the North Melbourne Recreation Reserve to the East Melbourne Cricket Ground for the season, sharing the ground with the Essendon (League) Football Club.
- For the first time, Association players were required to numbers on the backs of their guernseys to enable them to be identified from a distance. Some teams had been voluntarily wearing numbers since 1905, when Port Melbourne was the first to wear them.
- Kicking with the wind in the second quarter of its 22 June match, West Melbourne kicked an inaccurate 0.13 (13) against Footscray's no score; West Melbourne ultimately lost the match 7.6 (48) to 2.19 (31).
- Owing to regular poor behaviour of its home crowds, Port Melbourne was forced by the association to play its final two home games of the season away from the Port Melbourne Cricket Ground.
- On 24 August, Prahran forward Sydney Sykes scored all twelve goals, as well as five behinds, of Prahran's total score of 12.17 (89).
- In the final round match which directly decided which club finished fourth, West Melbourne 8.10 (58) defeated Essendon 8.9 (57) by one point, with Harrison kicking the winning goal for the Wests inside the final minute.
- J. Hutchison (Richmond) set a new record for most goals kicked in a season, breaking Albert Thurgood's record of 64 goals set in 1893. Hutchison kicked 66 goals during the home-and-away season.

== See also ==
- Victorian Football Association/Victorian Football League history (1877–2008)
- List of VFA/VFL Premiers (1877–2007)
