= 1919 VFA season =

1919 premiership season
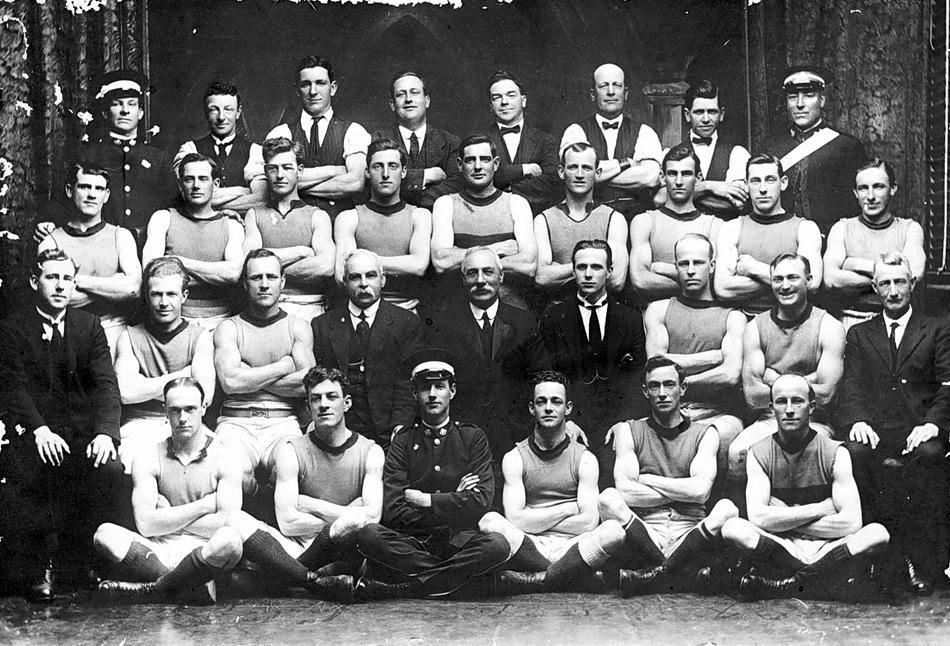
- Footscray, premier team
- Teams: 10
- Premiers: Footscray; 6th premiership
- Minor premiers: North Melbourne; 6th minor premiership

The 1919 Victorian Football Association season was the 41st season of the Australian rules football competition. The season was the first to be played after hostilities ended in World War I, and saw a return to a full-length season featuring all ten clubs for the first time since 1914.

The premiership was won by the Footscray Football Club, after it defeated North Melbourne by 22 points in the Grand Final on 27 September. It was the club's sixth VFA premiership. Footscray's premiership came after minor premier North Melbourne was undefeated through the home-and-home matches – and, in fact, undefeated since 1914 – before losing both finals matches it played.

== Association membership ==
The four clubs which opted not to play during 1918 due to World War I – Brighton, Essendon, Hawthorn and Williamstown – returned to senior competition for the 1919 season. As a result, the Association returned to ten competing clubs, as it had been prior to the war.

== Rule changes ==
After having played with each team fielding sixteen-a-side since 1912, the Association opted to return to fielding eighteen players on each team.

After a war-time agreement between the League and Association regarding player transfers between the two competitions expired in 1918, the Association introduced a rule which would see a player disqualified from the Association for two years if he transferred to a League club without a permit from the Association; but, as there was no longer a formal arrangement between the two competitions, such players remained free to play in the League during this period of disqualification.

== Premiership ==
The home-and-home season was played over eighteen rounds, with each club playing the others twice; then, the top four clubs contested a finals series under the amended Argus system to determine the premiers for the season.

=== Ladder ===
1919 VFA ladder
Pos	Team	Pld	W	L	D	PF	PA	PP	Pts
1	North Melbourne	18	18	0	0	1401	609	43.5	72
2	Footscray (P)	18	14	4	0	1385	700	50.5	58 (Note: 2 bonus points)
3	Brunswick	18	12	6	0	1216	975	80.2	48
4	Northcote	18	12	6	0	1031	900	87.3	48
5	Williamstown	18	9	9	0	916	937	102.3	36
6	Hawthorn	18	8	10	0	974	1161	119.2	32
7	Prahran	18	6	12	0	941	1234	131.1	24
8	Port Melbourne	18	5	13	0	923	1309	141.8	20
9	Brighton	18	3	15	0	921	1421	154.3	12
10	Essendon	18	3	15	0	793	1251	157.8	12

Rules for classification: 1) points; 2) percentage; 3) number of points for.
(P) Premiers

=== Finals ===
	Semi-finals
Saturday, 6 September	Footscray 12.8 (80)	def.	Northcote 4.9 (33)	East Melbourne Cricket Ground (crowd: 9,000)
Saturday, 13 September	North Melbourne 8.4 (52)	def. by	Brunswick 7.19 (61)	East Melbourne Cricket Ground (crowd: 9,000)

	Preliminary Final
Saturday, 20 September	Footscray 8.11 (59)	def.	Brunswick 7.4 (46)	East Melbourne Cricket Ground (crowd: 17,000)

1919 VFA Grand Final
Saturday, 27 September	North Melbourne	def. by	Footscray	East Melbourne Cricket Ground (crowd: 20,000)
1.1 (7); 4.6 (30); 4.7 (31); 6.7 (43)	Q1; Q2; Q3; Final	4.5 (29); 4.8 (32); 6.16 (52); 8.17 (65)	Umpires: Hurley
Barker, Forbes, Hawkins, Irwin, Rawle, Stevens	Goals	Craddock 4, Howell, Martin, Morgan, Samson

== Notable events ==
=== North Melbourne's record winning streak ===
From 1914 until 1919, North Melbourne dominated the Association to compile a record winning streak. Between its two-point loss against Footscray on 17 July 1914 and its nine-point loss against Brunswick in the semi-final on 13 September 1919, North Melbourne won a total of 58 consecutive matches – including 49 premiership matches and nine other matches, such as patriotic fund-raisers during the war. During this time, North Melbourne won three premierships (1914, 1915 and 1918), and completed two (shortened) unbeaten seasons: 15–0 in 1915 and 12–0 in 1918 – it was the last time a team won every match in a season until Geelong West in 1972 (Division 2), and the last time a team achieved it in the top division until Port Melbourne in 2011.

After losing the semi-final against Brunswick, North Melbourne also lost its next match – the Grand final against Footscray – to finish second for the season.

== See also ==
- List of VFA/VFL Premiers
