= 1922 VFA season =

44th season of the Australian rules football competition

1922 VFA premiership season
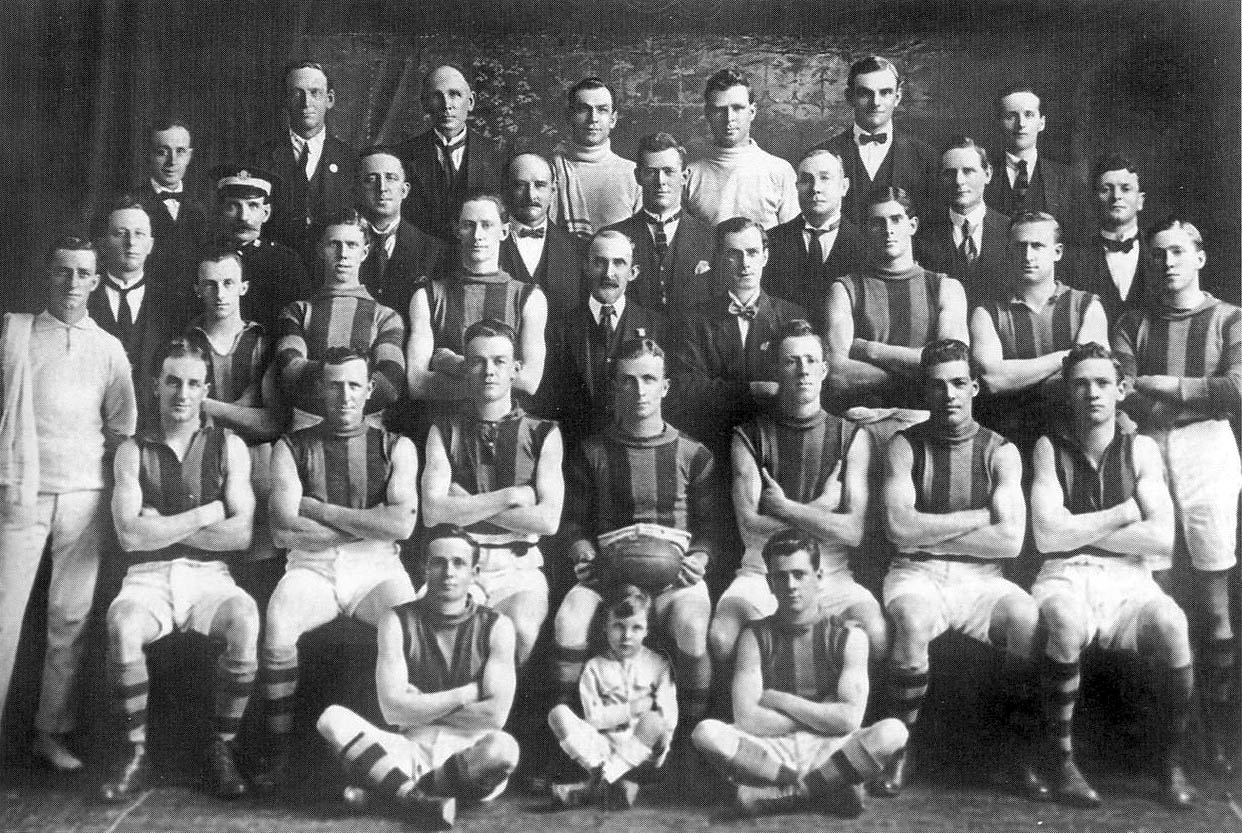
- Port Melbourne, premiers
- Teams: 10
- Premiers: Port Melbourne; 3rd premiership
- Minor premiers: Footscray; 6th minor premiership

The 1922 Victorian Football Association season was the 44th season of the Australian rules football competition. The premiership was won by the Port Melbourne Football Club, after it defeated Footscray by two points on 23 September, in a controversial Grand Final which several of its players were offered money to throw. It was the club's third VFA premiership.

== Association membership ==
Following the closure of the East Melbourne Cricket Ground in 1921, the Essendon (Association) Football Club left the Association, due to the Essendon (League) Football Club moving into its home ground. North Melbourne had disbanded midway through the 1921 season as it tried to capitalise on Essendon's (L.) move, but reformed at the end of the year, amalgamated with the Essendon (A.) club, and resumed its place in the Association, albeit missing many of its best players which had left the club when it disbanded.

To replace Essendon (A.), a new senior club based in Geelong was admitted to the Association. The new club was administered by the Geelong & District Junior Football Association, and was called the Geelong Football Club; it was typically called Geelong (Association) or Geelong (A.) when required to distinguish it from the Geelong Football Club affiliated with the Victorian Football League. The Geelong (A.) team played its matches at Kardinia Park (at the time, Geelong (L.) played at Corio Oval).

These changes were seen as a rare strategic victory for the Association over the League. The Association had managed to gain a slightly stronger foothold over inner city Melbourne by forcing Essendon (L.) into the outer suburbs; and it had then established a club in Geelong, which had previously been served by only a League team, in the hope of attracting some Geelong-grown talent towards the Association. The victory would be short-lived, as North Melbourne was admitted to the League after three years and Geelong (A.) was out of the Association after six years.

Before the season, Footscray, Prahran and Williamstown all applied to join the League; and Camberwell, Coburg and Geelong West all applied to join the Association. All six applications were rejected.

== Premiership ==
The home-and-home season was played over eighteen rounds, with each club playing the others twice; then, the top four clubs contested a finals series under the amended Argus system to determine the premiers for the season.

=== Ladder ===
1922 VFA ladder
Pos	Team	Pld	W	L	D	PF	PA	PP	Pts
1	Footscray	18	16	2	0	1539	809	52.6	64
2	Port Melbourne (P)	18	14	4	0	1421	1035	72.8	56
3	North Melbourne	18	12	6	0	1179	996	84.5	48
4	Williamstown	18	10	7	1	1246	1016	81.5	42
5	Brunswick	18	10	7	1	1369	1167	85.2	42
6	Hawthorn	18	10	7	1	1304	1126	86.3	42
7	Northcote	18	7	10	1	1287	1336	103.8	30
8	Brighton	18	6	12	0	1100	1273	115.7	24
9	Geelong	18	2	16	0	935	1620	173.3	8
10	Prahran	18	1	17	0	829	1827	220.4	4

Rules for classification: 1) points; 2) percentage; 3) number of points for.
(P) Premiers

=== Finals ===
	Semifinals
Saturday, 2 September	Port Melbourne 13.14 (92)	def.	Williamstown 8.3 (51)	North Melbourne Recreation Reserve (crowd: 14,500)
Saturday, 9 September	Footscray 6.12 (48)	def. by	North Melbourne 10.8 (68)	North Melbourne Recreation Reserve (crowd: 12,000)

	Preliminary Final
Saturday, 16 September	Port Melbourne 9.12 (66)	def.	North Melbourne 5.8 (38)	North Melbourne Recreation Reserve (crowd: 13,500)

1922 VFA Grand Final
Saturday, 23 September	Footscray	def. by	Port Melbourne	North Melbourne Recreation Reserve (crowd: 20,000)
0.2 (2); 4.7 (31); 5.7 (37); 8.10 (58)	Q1; Q2; Q3; Final	6.2 (38); 7.2 (44); 9.6 (60); 9.6 (60)	Umpires: McKinnon
O'Brien 4, Samson 2, Holden, Outen	Goals	Taylor 3, Barfoot, Dobrigh, O'Brien, Rees, Stanford, Walton

== Grand Final bribery scandal ==
Four Port Melbourne players, George Ogilvie, Bill Rudd, Bill Walton and captain Gus Dobrigh reported to the club that they were separately offered large sums of money, as much as £100, to play dead in the Grand Final to fix the result in Footscray's favour.

Additionally, Mr Sinclair of the Port Melbourne club reported that he had received a telephone call from a man in the lead-up to the match who claimed to be a Port Melbourne supporter, asking for details of Port Melbourne tactics, but the man had left a false telephone number and Sinclair also reported that he had received an unusually large volume of requests for wagers on Footscray to win the match. All four players refused to throw the match, and Port Melbourne won by two points.

Port Melbourne referred the matter to the Association, who investigated and charged three men – all connected with the Footscray Football Club – with attempted bribery:

- Club President George Sayer and player Vern Banbury were both alleged to have attempted to bribe Dobrigh, Rudd and Walton in the lead-up to the match.
- Player Matthew O'Donohue was alleged to have attempted to bribe Ogilvie on the field during the Grand Final.

Both O'Donohue and Sayer were found not guilty, with the Association ruling that Sayer had no involvement, much less knowledge, of the attempted bribery, while no witnesses could corroborate the allegation against O'Donohue. Banbury was found guilty and suspended from the Association for life. Banbury is considered to have acted on his own accord, without any direction from the club, with Footscray itself found not guilty of any wrongdoing.

== Notable events ==
- Bill Walton was appointed captain-coach of Hawthorn in 1922. He was, however, refused a clearance by Port Melbourne and as a result spent the season playing for them, while coaching Hawthorn during the week. Twice that season, he had the unusual situation of playing a VFA game against the club that he coached. In one of those matches a Port Melbourne teammate had to be restrained from striking Walton over Walton's vocal support for the player's opponent.
- On 5 August, Hawthorn set a new record for the highest score in Association history. Hawthorn scored 30.31 (211) against Prahran 6.9 (45).

== See also ==
- List of VFA premiers
