= 1923 VFA season =

1923 VFA premiership season
- Teams: 10
- Premiers: Footscray; 8th premiership
- Minor premiers: Footscray; 7th minor premiership

The 1923 Victorian Football Association season was the 45th season of the Australian rules football competition. The premiership was won by the Footscray Football Club, after it defeated Port Melbourne by 14 points in the Grand Final on 1 October. It was the club's eighth VFA premiership, which meant that the club surpassed Geelong (L.) for the most premierships won in VFA history.

== Rule changes ==
In 1923, the League and Association entered into a new agreement in which players could not transfer from one competition to the other without a clearance from his club and a permit from his current competition. Such a rule had existing prior to 1918, but since it had lapsed a refusal by one competition to permit a transfer was not binding in the other. The League was motivated to enter into the agreement by the aggressive recruiting of some Association clubs over the previous few years. The agreement was intended to last for five years, but it was broken prior to the 1925 season during the off-field machinations which led to Footscray, Hawthorn and North Melbourne leaving the Association and joining the League.

== Premiership ==
The home-and-home season was played over eighteen rounds, with each club playing the others twice; then, the top four clubs contested a finals series under the amended Argus system to determine the premiers for the season.

=== Ladder ===
1923 VFA ladder
| Pos | Team | Pld | W | L | D | PF | PA | PP | Pts |
|---|---|---|---|---|---|---|---|---|---|
| 1 | Footscray (P) | 18 | 16 | 2 | 0 | 1527 | 910 | 59.6 | 64 |
| 2 | Port Melbourne | 18 | 15 | 2 | 1 | 1399 | 930 | 66.5 | 62 |
| 3 | Williamstown | 18 | 12 | 6 | 0 | 1187 | 966 | 81.4 | 48 |
| 4 | Hawthorn | 18 | 11 | 7 | 0 | 1203 | 975 | 81.0 | 44 |
| 5 | Brunswick | 18 | 9 | 8 | 1 | 1120 | 1109 | 99.0 | 38 |
| 6 | North Melbourne | 18 | 9 | 8 | 1 | 1143 | 1132 | 99.0 | 38 |
| 7 | Brighton | 18 | 8 | 10 | 0 | 1170 | 1213 | 103.7 | 32 |
| 8 | Prahran | 18 | 3 | 14 | 1 | 861 | 1535 | 178.3 | 14 |
| 9 | Northcote | 18 | 3 | 15 | 0 | 952 | 1217 | 127.8 | 12 |
| 10 | Geelong | 18 | 2 | 16 | 0 | 855 | 1439 | 168.3 | 8 |

Rules for classification: 1) points; 2) percentage; 3) number of points for.
(P) Premiers

=== Finals ===
| | Semifinals |
| Saturday, 8 September | Port Melbourne 14.11 (95) | def. | Hawthorn 9.13 (67) | North Melbourne Recreation Reserve (crowd: 12,000) |
| Saturday, 15 September | Footscray 12.7 (79) | def. | Williamstown 6.11 (47) | North Melbourne Recreation Reserve (crowd: 15,000) |

| | Final |
| Saturday, 22 September | Footscray 5.11 (41) | def. by | Port Melbourne 8.9 (57) | North Melbourne Recreation Reserve (crowd: 20,000) |

1923 VFA Grand Final
Saturday, 29 September | Footscray | def. | Port Melbourne | North Melbourne Recreation Reserve (crowd: 18,000)
3.4 (22); 3.4 (22); 6.9 (45); 7.10 (52) | Q1; Q2; Q3; Final | 0.0 (0); 2.1 (13); 2.2 (14); 5.8 (38) | Umpires: Jones
Mullins 2, Eason, Howell, O'Brien, Samson, Scanlon | Goals | Kerley 2, Barfoot, Cruddin, Taylor
C. Howell, for elbowing H. Bissett; C. Howell for fighting with H. Bissett; V. Samson, for striking G. Dobrigh; A. Smith, for retaliating against G. Dobrigh after being struck | Reports | G. Ogilvie, for striking L. Zinnick; J. Garbutt, for striking L. Mullins; H. Bissett, for fighting with C. Howell; G. Dobrigh, for charging A. Smith; G. Dobrigh, for retaliating against V. Samson after being charged G. Dobrigh, for striking A. Smith; G. Dobrigh, for using bad language with the umpire

== Awards ==
- Carpenter (Williamstown) was the leading goalkicker for the home-and-home matches, with 61 goals, narrowly beating George Taylor (Port Melbourne), who kicked 58 goals. Across all matches including finals, Taylor (65) led from Carpenter (63).

== See also ==
- List of VFA premiers
