= 1906 VFA season =

1906 premiership season
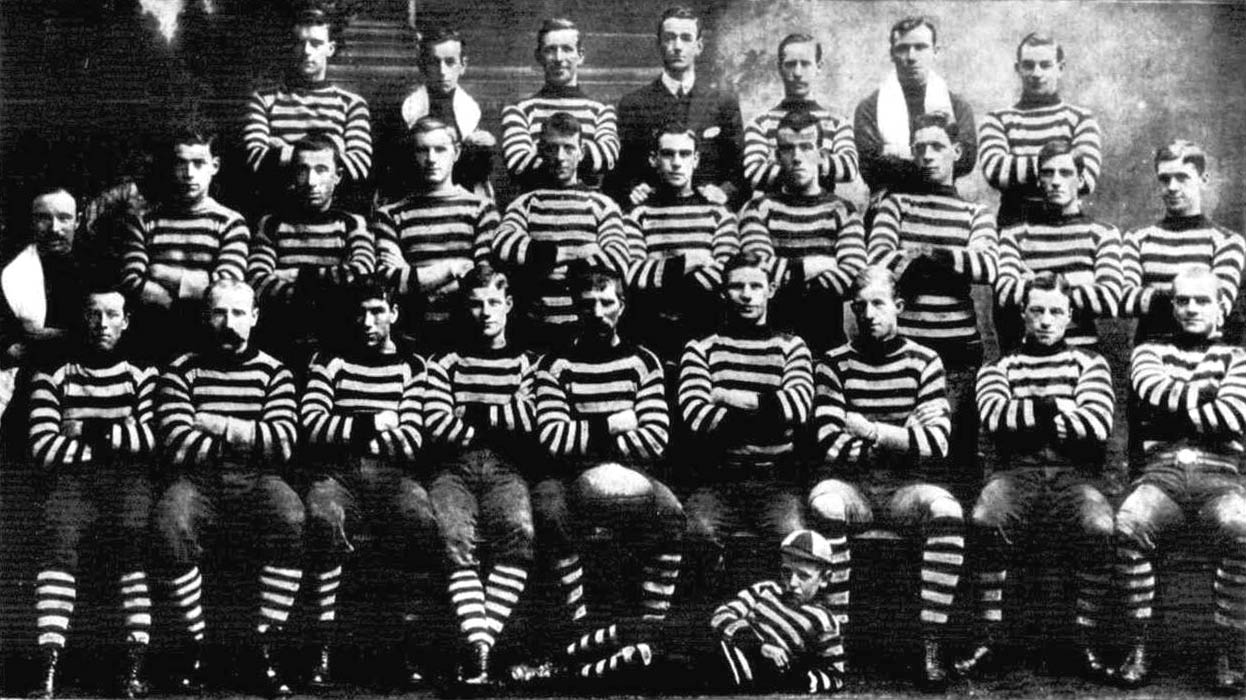
- West Melbourne FC, premiers
- Teams: 10
- Premiers: West Melbourne; 1st premiership
- Minor premiers: West Melbourne; 1st minor premiership

The 1906 Victorian Football Association season was the 30th season of the Australian rules football competition. The premiership was won by the West Melbourne Football Club, after defeating Footscray in the close final by eleven points. It was the first and only premiership won by West Melbourne during its nine-season stint in the VFA.

== Premiership ==
The home-and-away season was played over eighteen rounds, with each club playing the others twice; then, the top four clubs contested a finals series under the amended Argus system to determine the premiers for the season.

=== Ladder ===
1906 VFA ladder
Pos	Team	Pld	W	L	D	PF	PA	Pts
1	West Melbourne (P)	18	14	3	1	1162	595	58
2	Richmond	18	14	4	0	1135	693	56
3	North Melbourne	18	13	5	0	853	624	52
4	Footscray	18	12	5	1	916	644	50
5	Williamstown	18	12	6	0	1017	768	48
6	Brunswick	18	6	12	0	705	919	24
7	Port Melbourne	18	6	12	0	629	1068	24
8	Prahran	18	6	12	0	726	1095	24
9	Preston	18	5	13	0	796	953	20
10	Essendon	18	1	17	0	568	1245	4

Rules for classification: 1) points; 2) percentage; 3) number of points for.
(P) Premiers

=== Finals ===
	Semi Finals
Saturday, 15 September	West Melbourne 9.18 (72)	def.	North Melbourne 4.4 (28)	East Melbourne Cricket Ground
Saturday, 22 September	Richmond 6.5 (41)	def. by	Footscray 6.14 (50)	East Melbourne Cricket Ground (crowd: 12,000)

1906 VFA Final
Saturday, 29 September	West Melbourne	def.	Footscray	East Melbourne Cricket Ground (crowd: 20,000)
0.0 (0); 3.4 (22); 4.7 (31); 7.8 (50)	Q1; Q2; Q3; Final	3.2 (20); 3.5 (23); 5.8 (38); 5.9 (39)	Umpires: Souter
Williamson 3, Armstrong 2, McCann 2	Goals	Jacobson 2, Hedley, McCarthy, Hughes
Had Footscray won, minor premiers West Melbourne would have been entitled to a rematch the following Saturday to decide the premiership.

== Notable events ==
- Boundary umpires were introduced for Association matches for the first time in 1906.

=== Interleague matches ===
	1906 Interleague Matches
Saturday, 23 June	S.A.F.A. 7.9 (51)	def. by	V.F.A. 10.8 (68)	Adelaide Oval
Saturday, 11 August	V.F.A. 14.19 (103)	def.	S.A.F.A. 13.9 (87)	East Melbourne Cricket Ground (crowd: 5,000)
Wednesday, 29 August	Bendigo & Nth Dist. 3.12 (30)	def.	V.F.A. 3.10 (28)	Upper Reserve

The VFA's second match against the S.A.F.A. was originally scheduled to be played on an otherwise vacant day in the Melbourne football calendar, with a bye week in both the League and Association, and the V.F.L. team playing in Ballarat. However, the VFL made a change by shifting two of its 4 August matches onto 11 August, much to the VFA's chagrin, severely affecting the crowd at the game.

== See also ==
- Victorian Football Association/Victorian Football League History (1877-2008)
- List of VFA/VFL Premiers (1877–2007)
