= 1920 VFA season =

1920 VFA premiership season
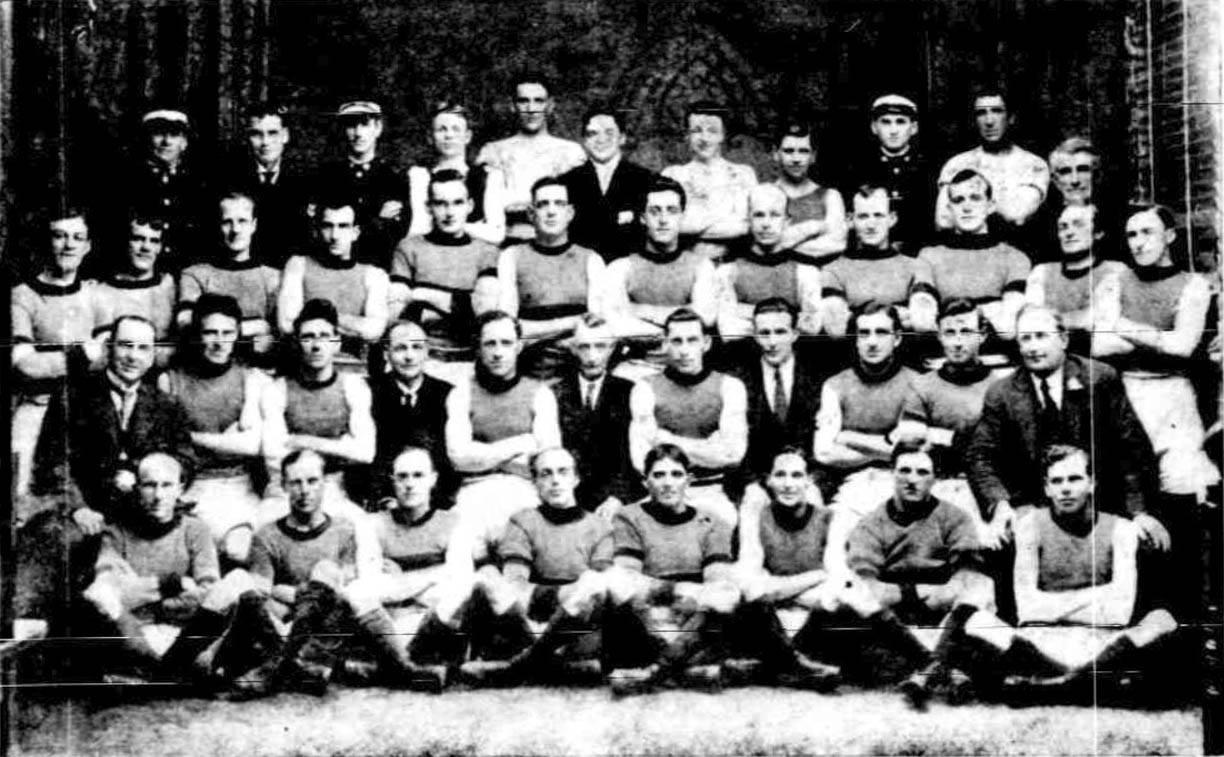
- Footscray team, premiers
- Teams: 10
- Premiers: Footscray; 7th premiership
- Minor premiers: Footscray; 4th minor premiership

The 1920 Victorian Football Association season was the 42nd season of the Australian rules football competition. The premiership was won by the Footscray Football Club, after it defeated Brunswick by 3 points in the final on 9 October. It was the club's seventh VFA premiership, drawing it level with Geelong for the most premierships in VFA history, and it was the club's second consecutive premiership.

== Premiership ==
The home-and-home season was played over eighteen rounds, with each club playing the others twice; then, the top four clubs contested a finals series under the amended Argus system to determine the premiers for the season.

=== Ladder ===
1920 VFA ladder
| Pos | Team | Pld | W | L | D | PF | PA | PP | Pts |
|---|---|---|---|---|---|---|---|---|---|
| 1 | Footscray (P) | 18 | 16 | 2 | 0 | 1384 | 913 | 66.0 | 64 |
| 2 | Brunswick | 18 | 13 | 5 | 0 | 1209 | 903 | 74.7 | 52 |
| 3 | North Melbourne | 18 | 13 | 5 | 0 | 1072 | 864 | 80.6 | 52 |
| 4 | Port Melbourne | 18 | 12 | 6 | 0 | 1311 | 1021 | 77.9 | 48 |
| 5 | Northcote | 18 | 9 | 9 | 0 | 1139 | 1045 | 91.7 | 36 |
| 6 | Williamstown | 18 | 8 | 10 | 0 | 1040 | 1179 | 113.4 | 32 |
| 7 | Prahran | 18 | 7 | 11 | 0 | 1079 | 1175 | 108.9 | 28 |
| 8 | Hawthorn | 18 | 6 | 12 | 0 | 1027 | 1375 | 133.9 | 24 |
| 9 | Essendon | 18 | 5 | 13 | 0 | 994 | 1228 | 123.5 | 20 |
| 10 | Brighton | 18 | 1 | 17 | 0 | 872 | 1423 | 163.2 | 4 |

Rules for classification: 1) points; 2) percentage; 3) number of points for.
(P) Premiers

=== Finals ===
| | Semifinals |
| Saturday, 11 September | Brunswick 5.15 (45) | def. | Port Melbourne 2.9 (21) | East Melbourne Cricket Ground (crowd: 7,000) |
| Saturday, 18 September (postponed) | Footscray | v | North Melbourne | East Melbourne Cricket Ground |
| Saturday, 25 September | Footscray 8.8 (56) | v | North Melbourne 6.15 (51) | East Melbourne Cricket Ground (crowd: 10,000) |
| Saturday, 2 October | Footscray 10.9 (69) | def. | North Melbourne 9.11 (65) | East Melbourne Cricket Ground (crowd: 20,000) |

1920 VFA Final
Saturday, 9 October | Footscray | def. | Brunswick | East Melbourne Cricket Ground (crowd: 18,000)
3.3 (21); 5.4 (34); 6.7 (43); 10.9 (69) | Q1; Q2; Q3; Final | 1.5 (11); 3.12 (30); 6.15 (51); 8.18 (66) | Umpires: Hurley
Park 5, Craddock 3, Howell, Martin | Goals | Christie 3, Kieley 2, Alessio, Cahill, Moore
Had Brunswick won, minor premiers Footscray would have been entitled to a rematch the following Saturday to decide the premiership.

== Notable events ==
=== Footscray vs North Melbourne unfinished semi-final ===
The semi-final played on 25 September between Footscray and North Melbourne ended with no result, due to the circumstances of its conclusion. Footscray was leading by five points, and North Melbourne forward Considine took a mark 30 yards out from goal directly in front, at almost the exact moment that the final bell rang. Umpire Hurley paid the mark to Considine, but much of the crowd which believed the game to be over flooded onto the field, preventing Considine from taking his kick for goal after the bell. After the crowd refused to subside, the players left the field.

As Considine had been prevented from taking a potentially match-winning kick for goal, the match was declared unfinished for no result. At a meeting on Monday 27 September, the Association agreed by a 10–5 majority that the match remained undecided, and that a full replay be played the following Saturday.

The circumstances surrounding the conclusion to this semi-final were practically identical to those which surrounded the infamous 1967 Tasmanian State Premiership Final, in which North Hobart's David Collins was prevented by the crowd from taking a potential match-winning kick (a much easier kick than Considine's) after the final siren.

=== Other notable events ===
- The Victorian Football League announced in October 1919 that it was seeking applications for a tenth team to join it for the 1920 season. It received applications from Brunswick, Footscray, Hawthorn, North Melbourne and Prahran, but ultimately decided to remain at nine clubs for the season.
- The semi-final between Footscray and North Melbourne was postponed from 18 to 25 September due to heavy rain leading up to and on the day of the match.

== See also ==
- List of VFA/VFL Premiers
