= Dave McNamara =

Australian rules footballer (1887–1967)

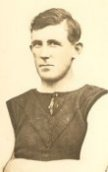

Personal information
- Full name: David John McNamara
- Nickname: Long Dave
- Born: 22 January 1887; Boosey
- Died: 15 August 1967 (aged 80); Caulfield, Victoria
- Original teams: Cobram, Numurkah, Benalla
- Debut: 12 August 1905, St Kilda vs. South Melbourne, at Junction Oval
- Height: 193 cm (6 ft 4 in)
- Weight: 89 kg (196 lb)

Playing career^{1}
Years	Club	Games (Goals)
1905–1909; 1914–1915; 1918–1919; 1921–1923	St Kilda	122 (187)
1909-1912	Essendon Association	71 (243)
Total		193 (430)

Coaching career
Years	Club	Games (W–L–D)
1914, 1922–1923	St Kilda	50 (22–26–2)
- ^{1} Playing statistics correct to the end of 1923.

Career highlights
- Club captain 1923; VFA Premiership: 1911, 1912; Leading goalkicker 1906, 1907, 1914, 1918; Inaugural St Kilda Hall of Fame inductee; Inaugural Australian Football Hall of Fame inductee

David John McNamara (22 January 1887 – 15 August 1967) was an Australian rules footballer who played for Essendon in the Victorian Football Association (VFA) and St Kilda in the Victorian Football League (VFL).

== Family ==
The son of Michael McNamara (1844–1904), and Mary Margaret Mcnamara (1851–1929), née Quinlan, David John McNamara was born at Boosey, Victoria on 22 January 1887.

He married Florence Margaret Mary Dobson (1887–1962) in 1909. They had two children: Neil David McNamara (1910–1965), and Beryl Mary McNamara (1912–1989).

== Football ==
A talented footballer, McNamara was a left-foot kick, 6 ft 4ins (193 cm.) tall, and had a finger-tip to finger-tip arm span of 6 ft 8 1/2 ins (204 cm.).

=== Numurkah, Cobram, and Benalla ===
McNamara was a dominant, powerful player in the North East of Victoria, who began playing for Numurkah as a 15-year-old in 1902.

He later played with Cobram in 1904, and Benalla in 1905,

=== St Kilda (VFL) ===
McNamara played with St Kilda as a Centre Half-Forward for most of his career.

He made his VFL debut in August, 1905 against South Melbourne Football Club.

=== Essendon (VFA) ===
Apparently in an atmosphere of player unrest, McNamara — one of the four or five players who had been informed, in writing, that their services were no longer required at St Kilda — was cleared from St Kilda on 30 June 1909, and he transferred to the Essendon Association Football Club half-way through the 1909 season, and played his first VFA match for Essendon, at centre half-forward, against Preston, on 3 July 1909.

In the 1912 season, he kicked 107 goals. In one match, against Melbourne City, at the Essendon Recreation Reserve, on 20 July 1912, he kicked 18 goals (plus one kick that hit the post) from 38 attempts — 36 of which were from marks, and only two were from free-kicks.

=== 1913 ===
On 14 April 1913, McNamara took possession of the Club Hotel, at 263 High Street (now known as St Kilda Road), at the corner of High Street and Charles Street, St Kilda. and, although initially refusing his request, Essendon granted his request (on the grounds of his purchase of the hotel) for a clearance (obviously, intended to be a clearance to St. Kilda), which was, according to McNamara's account, an agreed-upon condition of his original sign-on arrangement with the club.

Having succeeded in obtaining a clearance from Essendon, he then made an application to the VFA for a clearance to St Kilda (his hotel was less than 1 km from the Junction Oval).

His application was considered, and it was refused on 16 April 1913. No grounds were given for the refusal, and McNamara announced his retirement from football.

When McNamara requested that his case be re-opened and that additional evidence supporting his claims of a significant reduction in the business of his hotel if he were not to be playing for St Kilda be considered, his request was refused; and, when he appeared, in person, accompanied by his solicitor, at the location of the VFA committee's meeting on 23 April 1913, he was refused entry, and was (again without any reasons being given) told that his request for the VFA to re-examine the permit committee's decision had been refused.

At the time, this decision was the subject of considerable controversy.

=== St Kilda (VFL) ===
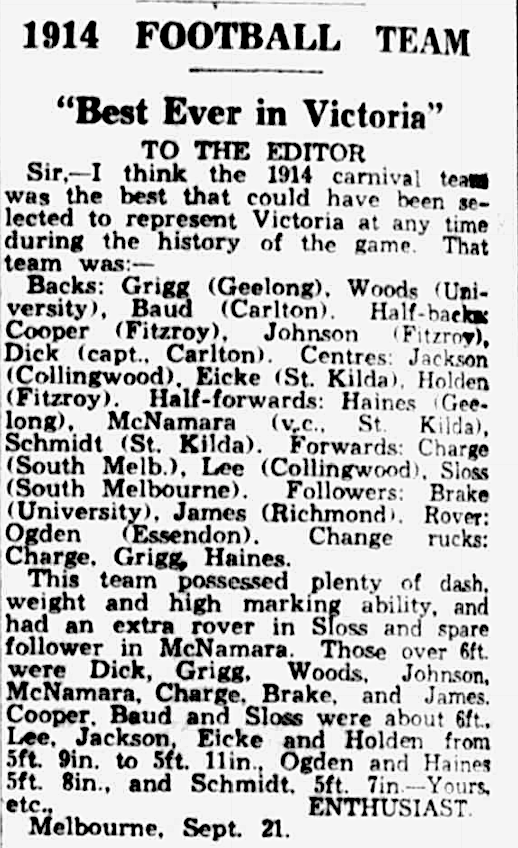
Enthusiast's Letter to the Editor The Herald, 21 Sept. 1934.

Having stood out of VFA football for the entire 1913 season, the VFL granted McNamara a permit to return to playing with St Kilda on 1 April 1914; it was a very welcome return, given that Ernie Sellars, the club's leading goal-kicker for the three preceding seasons (1911, 1912, and 1913), had transferred to West Australia to play with the East Perth Football Club.

In the match against Geelong, at the Junction Oval, on 9 September 1922, he scored 10 goals, 2 behinds (one of his kicks hit the post) from 12 attempts.

=== Ormond Amateurs (MAFA) ===
Later played amateur football for Ormond Amateur Football Club in the Metropolitan Amateur Football Association (MAFA) from 1924 to 1929.

== "Long Dave" McNamara ==
Renowned for the extreme distance, he routinely covered with both his place kicks and his drop kicks he was widely known as "Long Dave" McNamara.

=== 75 yards and 84 yards ===
On 19 May 1923, in his last VFL season, McNamara was best on the ground when St Kilda defeated Collingwood 10.9 (69) to 6.12 (48) at the Junction Oval. During the match, he kicked two (light-wind-assisted) long-distance goals with place kicks: one in the second quarter, and one in the last quarter. The two goals were later measured to have been kicked from 75 yards (69.6 metres) and 84 yards (76.8 metres) from goal, respectively; and, based upon the reports that "when it passed through [the goals] the ball was high over the heads of the defenders", there's no doubt that the first goal's kick covered far more than 75 yards.

=== 93 yards ===
Also, during that same match, another of McNamara's place kicks for goal missed; this extraordinary kick was later (accurately) measured from its placement to the spot upon which it landed, and was found to be 93 yards (85 metres). This is one of the longest recorded kick of a football in VFL history.

=== "World record": 86 yards, 1 foot ===
While McNamara's long-distance kicks were extraordinary, and given that the majority of them were made during actual matches, it is clear that they were not made under the strictest competition performance and measurement conditions.

On one occasion, however, his efforts were formally measured under the strictest competition conditions; and, on Thursday, 9 October 1913, he set what was, at the time, the "official" world place-kick record, at the Royal Launceston Show, kicking a distance of 86 yards 1 foot (79 metres).

== After football ==
=== St Klda Football Club ===
Served as a St Kilda committeeman, vice-president and later president.

=== Racehorse trainer ===
Following his retirement from football, McNamara established himself in a new career as a racehorse trainer, which he continued until about 1958. His period in the racing industry included serving as president with the Victorian Trainers' Association.

== Death ==
He died on 15 August 1967, aged 80.

== Recognition ==
=== Australian Football Hall of Fame ===
In 1996, he was one of the inaugural inductees into the Australian Football Hall of Fame.

=== St Kilda's Team of the century ===
In 2003, he was selected as the forward-pocket ruckman in the St Kilda Football Club Team of the Century.

=== St Kilda's Hall of Fame ===
In 2003, he was one of the inaugural inductees into the St Kilda Football Club's Hall of Fame.

== See also ==
- 1908 Melbourne Carnival
- 1914 Sydney Carnival
