= Billy Egan =

Australian rules footballer

Personal information
- Full name: William Martin Egan
- Born: 7 November 1886; North Melbourne, Victoria
- Died: 28 February 1941 (aged 54); Fitzroy, Victoria
- Original team: Footscray (VFA)

Playing career^{1}
Years	Club	Games (Goals)
1909	St Kilda	8 (0)
- ^{1} Playing statistics correct to the end of 1909.

William Martin Egan (7 November 1886 – 28 February 1941) was an Australian rules footballer who played with St Kilda in the Victorian Football League (VFL).

== Family ==
The son of Keiran Egan (-1948), and Margaret Egan, née Carrol, William Martin Egan was born at North Melbourne, Victoria on 7 November 1886.

He married Amy Elizabeth May Forbes (1891-) in 1920.

== Football ==
=== West Sydney Football Club (NSWFL) ===
He played for at least two seasons (1904 and 1905) with the West Sydney Football Club in the New South Wales Football League. He played for the Combined Sydney team that defeated the Combined Northern Districts team on 23 July 1904.

=== Prahran Football Club (VFA) ===
Cleared from West Sydney to the Prahran Football Club in the Victorian Football Association (VFA) in May 1907.

=== Footscray Football Club (VFA) ===
Cleared from Prahran to the Footscray Football Club in the Victorian Football Association (VFA) in April 1908.

=== St Kilda Football Club (VFL) ===
Granted a clearance from Footscray to St Kilda Football Club in the Victorian Football League (VFL) in 1909.

=== Melbourne City Football Club (VFA) ===
In June 1912 he was granted a clearance from St Kilda to the Melbourne City Football Club in the Victorian Football Association (VFA).

== Death ==
He died at St Vincent's Hospital, Melbourne on 28 February 1941.
