= Archie Pratt =

Australian rules footballer

Personal information
- Full name: Archibald Herbert Pratt
- Born: 31 January 1882; Collingwood, Victoria
- Died: 29 August 1941 (aged 59); Heidelberg, Victoria

Playing career^{1}
Years	Club	Games (Goals)
1901–02	North Melbourne (VFA)	9 (0)
1903	Preston (VFA)	10 (5)
1904	South Ballarat	
1905	South Melbourne	7 (3)
1906	St Kilda	2 (0)
1908–09	Northcote (VFA)	15 (8)
1910	Melbourne	3 (0)
1912–13	Melbourne City (VFA)	21 (11)
- ^{1} Playing statistics correct to the end of 1910.

Archibald Herbert Pratt (31 January 1882 – 29 August 1941) was an Australian rules footballer who played for the South Melbourne Football Club, St Kilda Football Club and Melbourne Football Club in the Victorian Football League (VFL).

== Family ==
He was the son of Vincent William Pratt (1840–1915), and Elizabeth Pratt, née Rettie.
