= 1912 VFA season =

1912 premiership season
- Teams: 10
- Premiers: Essendon (A.); 2nd premiership
- Minor premiers: Footscray; 2nd minor premiership

The 1912 VFA season was the 36th season of the Victorian Football Association (VFA), an Australian rules football competition played in the state of Victoria.

The premiership was won for the second consecutive time by Essendon (Association), after it defeated Footscray in the Grand Final by 21 points on 28 September. It was the club's second and last VFA premiership.

== Background ==
=== Rule changes ===
The VFA reduced the number of players on the field seventeen-a-side to sixteen-a-side in 1912. The change came only four years after reducing the numbers from eighteen to seventeen in 1908.

== Association membership ==
After several years of unsuccessful on-field performances by both clubs, the VFA was keen to see an amalgamation between the Preston and Northcote clubs; amalgamations between the two clubs, which represented neighbouring northern suburbs of Melbourne, had been mooted on several occasions since 1908, even before Northcote had joined the Association. For the first few years of their amalgamation, the club was formally known as the Northcote and Preston Football Club; but, it played its games in Northcote, retained Northcote's colours, and its team in the VFA was known as Northcote. The merged entity is considered a continuation of the Northcote Football Club.

At the same time, the Association had been keen for many years to field a team in the inner city, an area historically dominated by League clubs. This vision was finally realised in 1912, with the establishment of the Melbourne City Football Club, which played its games at the East Melbourne Cricket Ground.

With these two changes, the size of the Association remained constant at ten teams.

== Premiership ==
The home-and-home season was played over eighteen rounds, with each club playing the others twice; then, the top four clubs contested a finals series under the amended Argus system to determine the premiers for the season.

=== Ladder ===
1912 VFA ladder
Pos	Team	Pld	W	L	D	PF	PA	PP	Pts
1	Footscray	18	15	3	0	1559	900	173.2	60
2	North Melbourne	18	15	3	0	1269	907	139.9	60
3	Essendon (P)	18	13	5	0	1458	867	168.2	52
4	Brunswick	18	11	7	0	1140	1082	105.4	44
5	Brighton	18	10	8	0	1111	1085	102.4	40
6	Port Melbourne	18	8	10	0	985	1086	90.7	32
7	Williamstown	18	7	11	0	1027	1115	92.1	28
8	Northcote	18	6	12	0	1030	1230	83.7	24
9	Prahran	18	5	13	0	1125	1327	84.8	20
10	Melbourne City	18	0	18	0	762	1866	40.8	0

Rules for classification: 1) points; 2) percentage; 3) number of points for.
(P) Premiers

=== Finals ===
	Semi Finals
Saturday, 24 August	North Melbourne 9.6 (60)	drew with	Brunswick 9.6 (60)	North Melbourne Recreation Reserve (crowd: 15,000)
Saturday, 31 August	Footscray 6.12 (48)	def. by	Essendon 10.11 (71)	North Melbourne Recreation Reserve (crowd: 20,000)
Saturday, 7 September	North Melbourne 6.12 (48)	drew with	Brunswick 6.12 (48)	North Melbourne Recreation Reserve (crowd: 11,000)
Saturday, 14 September	North Melbourne 12.11 (83)	def.	Brunswick 9.14 (68)	North Melbourne Recreation Reserve (crowd: 11,000)

	Preliminary Final
Saturday, 21 September	North Melbourne 14.14 (98)	def. by	Essendon 16.6 (102)	North Melbourne Recreation Reserve (crowd: 20,000)

1912 VFA Grand Final
Saturday, 28 September	Footscray	def. by	Essendon	North Melbourne Recreation Reserve (crowd: 25,000)
1.2 (8); 2.7 (19); 2.9 (21); 5.11 (41)	Q1; Q2; Q3; Final	2.3 (15); 3.6 (24); 7.8 (50); 9.8 (62)	Umpires: Kendall
Banbury, Borthwick, Cotton, Craddock, Knight	Goals	Clarke 3, McNamara 3, Hoare, Lewis, Sevior

== Notable events ==
=== Interstate matches ===
A representative Association team toured Broken Hill in June and July, playing two matches against a Barrier Ranges Football Association representative team. Jack McKenzie (Brunswick) was captain of the Association team.

	1912 Interstate Matches
Saturday, 29 June	Barrier Ranges 8.12 (60)	def. by	Victoria (VFA) 9.16 (70)	Jubilee Oval, Broken Hill (crowd: 5,000)
Wednesday, 3 July (morning)	Barrier Ranges 8.10 (58)	def.	Victoria (VFA) 6.6 (42)	Jubilee Oval, Broken Hill

=== Other notable events ===
- Dave McNamara (Essendon) set two new Association goalkicking records during the season. On 20 July, he kicked eighteen goals against Melbourne City, setting a new record for most goals in a game. Then he set a new record for most goals in a season, kicking 107 goals in all matches (including finals) to break his own record of 81 goals from 1911. So dominant was McNamara that he kicked more goals than the next best two players combined.
- The semi-final between North Melbourne and Brunswick on 24 August finished as a draw, the first ever VFA final to finish as such. A replay was scheduled for two weeks later (the week after the other scheduled semi-final). The replay was also drawn, so another replay was held the following week.
- The premiership trophy, which had first been presented in 1910, was awarded permanently to the Essendon (A.) Football Club. The trophy was to be awarded to the first team to win it either three times overall, or twice consecutively.
