= 1967 TANFL season =

Australian rules football season

- Teams: Clarence Kangaroos; Glenorchy Magpies; Hobart Tigers; New Norfolk Eagles; North Hobart Robins; Sandy Bay Seagulls
- Premiers: Nth Hobart
- Minor premiers: Glenorchy

Attendance
- Matches played: 61
- Total attendance: 275,197 (4,511 per match)

The 1967 Tasmanian Australian National Football League (TANFL) premiership season was an Australian Rules football competition staged in Hobart, Tasmania over nineteen (19) roster rounds and four (4) finals series matches between 1 April and 16 September 1967.

== Participating Clubs ==
- Clarence District Football Club
- Glenorchy District Football Club
- Hobart Football Club
- New Norfolk District Football Club
- North Hobart Football Club
- Sandy Bay Football Club

=== 1967 TANFL Club Coaches ===
- John Bingley (Clarence)
- Bobby Parsons (Glenorchy)
- John Watts (Hobart)
- Trevor Leo (New Norfolk)
- John Devine (North Hobart)
- Ray Giblett (Sandy Bay)

=== TANFL Reserves Grand Final ===
- New Norfolk 12.6 (78) v Clarence 8.14 (62) – North Hobart Oval

=== TANFL Under-19's Grand Final ===
(Saturday, 30 September 1967)

- Nth Hobart 6.5 (41) v New Norfolk 2.10 (22) – North Hobart Oval

=== State Preliminary Final ===
(Saturday, 23 September 1967)

- Nth Hobart 18.8 (116) v East Launceston 8.17 (65) – Att: 8,444 at North Hobart Oval

Note: North Hobart (TANFL guernseys) and East Launceston (NTFA guernseys) wore alternate strips due to a guernsey clash.

=== State Grand Final ===
(Saturday, 30 September 1967) – (See:1967 Tasmanian State Premiership Final)

- Wynyard: 1.1 (7) | 9.7 (61) | 10.9 (69) | 13.14 (92)
- Nth Hobart: 3.8 (26) | 5.11 (41) | 11.17 (83) | 12.19 (91)
- Attendance: 8,289 at West Park Oval

Note: This match was abandoned and officially declared as "No Result" due to a ground invasion by spectators.

=== Intrastate Matches ===
Jubilee Shield (Saturday, 6 May 1967)

- TANFL 11.17 (83) v NWFU 10.8 (68) – Att: 4,635 at Devonport Oval

Jubilee Shield (Saturday, 3 June 1967)

- TANFL 18.10 (118) v NTFA 11.13 (79) – Att: 13,415 at North Hobart Oval

Inter-Association Match (Sunday, 4 June 1967)

- TANFL 15.14 (104) v WTFA 11.10 (76) – Att: 2,000 at Queenstown Oval

Inter-Association Match (Saturday, 17 June 1967)

- Huon FA 15.14 (104) v TANFL 14.15 (99) – Att: 20,142 at North Hobart Oval (Curtain-Raiser)

=== Interstate Match ===
Interstate Match (Saturday, 17 June 1967)

- Victoria 13.16 (94) v Tasmania 11.11 (77) – Att: 20,142 at North Hobart Oval

=== Leading Goalkickers: TANFL ===
- David Collins (Nth Hobart) – 53
- Brent Palfreyman (Sandy Bay) – 45
- Alan Besier (New Norfolk) – 42
- Darrel West (Glenorchy) – 42
- Burnie Payne (Hobart) – 35

=== Medal Winners ===
- John Richmond (Clarence) – William Leitch Medal
- Robert "Boy" Wilton (New Norfolk) – George Watt Medal (Reserves)
- G.Barnes (New Norfolk) – V.A Geard Medal (Under-19's)
- Ron Marney (Glenorchy) – Weller Arnold Medal (Best player in Intrastate matches)

== 1967 TANFL Ladder ==
Pos	Team	Pld	W	L	D	PF	PA	PP	Pts
1	Glenorchy	19	13	5	1	1622	1226	132.3	54
2	Clarence	19	11	7	1	1593	1470	108.4	46
3	New Norfolk	19	10	8	1	1513	1433	105.6	42
4	North Hobart	19	10	8	1	1494	1575	94.9	42
5	Sandy Bay	19	7	12	0	1418	1630	87.0	28
6	Hobart	19	4	15	0	1439	1742	82.6	16

=== Round 1 ===
(Saturday, 1 April 1967)

- Nth Hobart 15.5 (95) v Clarence 13.16 (94) – Att: 6,442 at North Hobart Oval
- Sandy Bay 15.8 (98) v Hobart 12.20 (92) – Att: 4,802 at Queenborough Oval
- New Norfolk 7.13 (55) v Glenorchy 7.13 (55) – Att: 3,975 at Boyer Oval

=== Round 2 ===
(Saturday, 8 April 1967)

- New Norfolk 17.18 (120) v Clarence 10.14 (74) – Att: 4,415 at North Hobart Oval
- Hobart 16.20 (116) v Nth Hobart 5.17 (47) – Att: 3,546 at TCA Ground
- Glenorchy 18.12 (120) v Sandy Bay 7.10 (52) – Att: 4,146 at KGV Park

=== Round 3 ===
(Saturday, 15 April 1967)

- Glenorchy 19.13 (127) v Nth Hobart 11.10 (76) – Att: 5,844 at North Hobart Oval
- Clarence 9.12 (66) v Hobart 8.5 (53) – Att: 3,899 at Bellerive Oval
- New Norfolk 16.5 (101) v Sandy Bay 14.11 (95) – Att: 3,849 at Queenborough Oval

=== Round 4 ===
(Saturday, 22 April & Tuesday, 25 April 1967)

- Clarence 13.5 (83) v Sandy Bay 9.14 (68) – Att: 6,695 at North Hobart Oval
- New Norfolk 9.19 (73) v Nth Hobart 5.4 (34) – Att: 2,562 at Boyer Oval
- Glenorchy 14.12 (96) v Hobart 9.11 (65) – Att: 5,550 at North Hobart Oval (Tuesday)

=== Round 5 ===
(Saturday, 29 April 1967)

- Sandy Bay 10.18 (78) v Nth Hobart 8.10 (58) – Att: 4,431 at North Hobart Oval
- New Norfolk 10.16 (76) v Hobart 10.8 (68) – Att: 2,882 at TCA Ground
- Glenorchy 9.8 (62) v Clarence 7.11 (53) – Att: 4,991 at KGV Park

=== Round 6 ===
(Saturday, 6 May 1967)

- Hobart 11.18 (84) v Sandy Bay 10.12 (72) – Att: 3,381 at North Hobart Oval
- Clarence 9.19 (73) v Nth Hobart 11.7 (73) – Att: 2,531 at Bellerive Oval
- New Norfolk 11.15 (81) v Glenorchy 8.15 (63) – Att: 3,881 at KGV Park

=== Round 7 ===
(Saturday, 13 May 1967)

- Hobart 16.9 (105) v Nth Hobart 11.25 (91) – Att: 6,235 at North Hobart Oval
- Clarence 13.6 (84) v New Norfolk 8.15 (63) – Att: 2,798 at Boyer Oval
- Glenorchy 10.9 (69) v Sandy Bay 6.7 (43) – Att: 3,506 at Queenborough Oval

=== Round 8 ===
(Saturday, 20 May 1967)

- Sandy Bay 11.9 (75) v New Norfolk 10.11 (71) – Att: 4,022 at North Hobart Oval
- Glenorchy 15.9 (99) v Nth Hobart 9.12 (66) – Att: 4,017 at KGV Park
- Clarence 13.12 (90) v Hobart 13.7 (85) – Att: 4,696 at TCA Ground

=== Round 9 ===
(Saturday, 27 May 1967)

- Nth Hobart 14.11 (95) v New Norfolk 11.17 (83) – Att: 3,621 at North Hobart Oval
- Glenorchy 16.16 (112) v Hobart 8.12 (60) – Att: 3,133 at TCA Ground
- Clarence 15.17 (107) v Sandy Bay 9.10 (64) – Att: 2,734 at Bellerive Oval

=== Round 10 ===
(Saturday, 10 June & Monday, 12 June 1967)

- Hobart 12.10 (82) v New Norfolk 9.16 (70) – Att: 3,684 at North Hobart Oval
- Nth Hobart 16.15 (111) v Sandy Bay 12.15 (87) – Att: 2,846 at Queenborough Oval
- Glenorchy 14.12 (96) v Clarence 12.8 (80) – Att: 8,840 at North Hobart Oval (Monday) *

Note: This was the highest roster match attendance in both TANFL and Tasmanian football history.

=== Round 11 ===
(Saturday, 24 June 1967)

- Nth Hobart 16.16 (112) v Clarence 14.14 (98) – Att: 4,975 at North Hobart Oval
- Sandy Bay 14.16 (100) v Hobart 11.12 (78) – Att: 2,676 at Queenborough Oval
- New Norfolk 14.11 (95) v Glenorchy 13.12 (90) – Att: 3,469 at KGV Park

=== Round 12 ===
(Saturday, 1 July 1967)

- Glenorchy 11.10 (76) v Sandy Bay 9.7 (61) – Att: 2,138 at North Hobart Oval
- Nth Hobart 8.11 (59) v Hobart 6.8 (44) – Att: 1,910 at TCA Ground
- New Norfolk 9.14 (68) v Clarence 5.8 (38) – Att: 1,483 at Boyer Oval

=== Round 13 ===
(Saturday, 8 July 1967)

- Glenorchy 12.12 (84) v Nth Hobart 6.6 (42) – Att: 6,073 at North Hobart Oval
- Sandy Bay 12.8 (80) v New Norfolk 7.11 (53) – Att: 2,765 at Queenborough Oval
- Clarence 13.8 (86) v Hobart 11.5 (71) – Att: 2,557 at Bellerive Oval

=== Round 14 ===
(Saturday, 15 July 1967)

- Clarence 13.20 (98) v Sandy Bay 7.9 (51) – Att: 5,023 at North Hobart Oval
- Glenorchy 14.11 (95) v Hobart 10.17 (77) – Att: 3,029 at KGV Park
- Nth Hobart 13.13 (91) v New Norfolk 10.6 (66) – Att: 2,296 at Boyer Oval

=== Round 15 ===
(Saturday, 22 July 1967)

- Nth Hobart 13.9 (87) v Sandy Bay 11.9 (75) – Att: 4,490 at North Hobart Oval
- New Norfolk 16.17 (113) v Hobart 7.9 (51) – Att: 1,836 at Boyer Oval
- Glenorchy 8.19 (67) v Clarence 10.5 (65) – Att: 4,715 at KGV Park

=== Round 16 ===
(Saturday, 29 July 1967)

- New Norfolk 14.11 (95) v Glenorchy 12.11 (83) – Att: 5,250 at North Hobart Oval
- Clarence 14.10 (94) v Nth Hobart 12.12 (84) – Att: 3,690 at Bellerive Oval
- Sandy Bay 17.16 (118) v Hobart 16.15 (111) – Att: 1,908 at TCA Ground

=== Round 17 ===
(Saturday, 5 August 1967)

- Nth Hobart 17.18 (120) v Hobart 8.4 (52) – Att: 3,395 at North Hobart Oval
- Sandy Bay 9.2 (56) v Glenorchy 6.13 (49) – Att: 3,082 at Queenborough Oval
- Clarence 17.5 (107) v New Norfolk 10.11 (71) – Att: 4,328 at Bellerive Oval

=== Round 18 ===
(Saturday, 12 August 1967)

- Clarence 16.8 (104) v Hobart 14.15 (99) – Att: 3,292 at North Hobart Oval
- Nth Hobart 8.11 (59) v Glenorchy 6.15 (51) – Att: 4,022 at KGV Park
- New Norfolk 11.17 (83) v Sandy Bay 11.9 (75) – Att: 2,098 at Boyer Oval

=== Round 19 ===
(Saturday, 19 August 1967)

- Nth Hobart 14.10 (94) v New Norfolk 11.10 (76) – Att: 5,139 at North Hobart Oval
- Clarence 14.15 (99) v Sandy Bay 9.16 (70) – Att: 2,946 at Queenborough Oval
- Glenorchy 19.14 (128) v Hobart 5.15 (45) – Att: 2,280 at TCA Ground

=== First Semi Final ===
(Saturday, 26 August 1967)

- Nth Hobart: 1.5 (11) | 3.11 (29) | 6.12 (48) | 9.12 (66)
- New Norfolk: 1.4 (10) | 4.10 (34) | 7.12 (54) | 8.13 (61)
- Attendance: 12,536 at North Hobart Oval

=== Second Semi Final ===
(Saturday, 2 September 1967)

- Glenorchy: 0.3 (3) | 4.3 (27) | 5.11 (41) | 7.12 (54)
- Clarence: 0.5 (5) | 1.6 (12) | 4.10 (34) | 6.14 (50)
- Attendance: 12,235 at North Hobart Oval

=== Preliminary Final ===
(Saturday, 9 September 1967)

- Nth Hobart: 0.1 (1) | 6.5 (41) | 9.7 (61) | 11.11 (77)
- Clarence: 3.8 (26) | 3.15 (33) | 5.16 (46) | 8.20 (68)
- Attendance: 14,584 at North Hobart Oval

=== Grand Final ===
(Saturday, 16 September 1967)

- Nth Hobart: 3.3 (21) | 6.5 (41) | 9.8 (62) | 11.12 (78)
- Glenorchy: 2.5 (17) | 2.12 (24) | 3.13 (31) | 8.16 (64)
- Attendance: 17,523 at North Hobart Oval

Source: All scores and statistics courtesy of the Hobart Mercury and Saturday Evening Mercury (SEM) publications.
