= 1967 Tasmanian State Premiership Final =

Wynyard (NWFU)

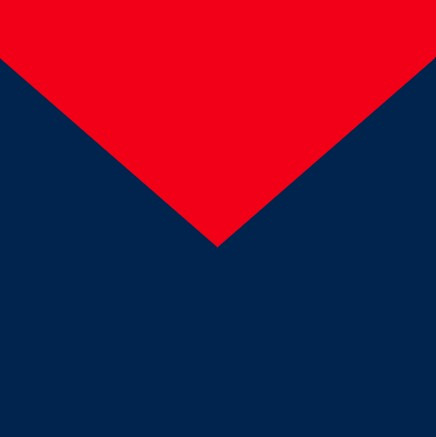
North Hobart (TANFL)
	1	2	3	4
WYN	1.1 (7)	9.7 (61)	10.9 (69)	13.14 (92)
NH	3.8 (26)	5.11 (41)	11.17 (83)	12.19 (91)
- Date: 30 September 1967
- Stadium: West Park Oval, Burnie, Tasmania
- Attendance: 8,289
- Umpires: Jack Pilgrim
- Coin toss won by: North Hobart
- Kicked toward: Eastern
- Result: No result

The 1967 Tasmanian State Premiership Final (colloquially known as the Goalpost Final) was an Australian rules football match played between the Wynyard Cats and the North Hobart Robins on Saturday 30 September 1967 at West Park Oval, Burnie, to decide the winner of the 1967 Tasmanian State Premiership. One of the most controversial games in Australian rules football history, the match was declared no result and the premiership was withheld after fans invaded the field and eventually took down the goal posts, preventing North Hobart full-forward David Collins from taking a kick after the siren which would likely have won or tied the game for the Robins.

== Tasmanian State Premiership ==
The Tasmanian State Premiership was a competition played most years from 1909 until 1978 between the individual premiers of Tasmania's two or three major football leagues: the Hobart-based Tasmanian Football League (TFL/TANFL); the Launceston-based Northern Tasmanian Football Association (NTFA); and (after 1950) the North West Football Union (NWFU), based on the north-western coast of the state. From 1950, one of the three leagues would qualify directly for and host the Premiership Final, while the premiers from the other two leagues would play-off in a Preliminary Final for the right to contest the Premiership.

== Lead-up ==
It was the NWFU's year to host the final, so the coastal premiers, the Wynyard Cats, qualified directly. After the disappointment of being eliminated in the 1966 coastal preliminary final after finishing the regular season as the Minor Premiers, Wynyard dominated the 1967 season. The Cats finished with a 17–1 record, with their only loss coming against Ulverstone by eight points, and they finished six wins ahead of the other three finalists: Burnie, Ulverstone and Cooee. They beat Burnie by 58 points in the second semi-final, and then won the Grand Final against Cooee by 36 points. It was Wynyard's second ever NWFU premiership, and the first time since 1957 that the flag had been won by any team other than the two Burnie-based sides (Burnie and Cooee).

North Hobart, then known as the Robins,^{Note 1} had finished last in the TANFL in 1966 with a record of 2–16. They had recruited John Devine from the Geelong Football Club in the VFL to serve as playing coach, but the team initially continued to languish as Devine served a suspension carried over from his final VFL match. The Robins sat last with a record of 1-6-1 after eight weeks, but then turned their form around, winning nine of their remaining eleven games to finish fourth on the TANFL ladder. In the finals, they improved this record to twelve wins from fourteen games with a 5-point win over New Norfolk in the first semi-final, a 9-point win over Clarence in the southern preliminary final, and a 15-point win over Minor Premiers Glenorchy in the TANFL Grand Final. It was North Hobart's 21st TANFL premiership, and the first time a club had come from fourth on the ladder to win the flag. In the State Preliminary Final at North Hobart Oval, the Robins hosted first-time NFTA Premiers, East Launceston (who had also come from last place in 1966 to win their flag), and were comfortable winners by 51 points.

Wynyard had never previously contested the State Premiership,^{Note 2} while it was North Hobart's eighteenth appearance in the State Premiership Final, with the club attempting to win its twelfth title, and first since 1962.

The match was umpired by Jack Pilgrim from the NTFA, the neutral league. Pilgrim had umpired the TANFL preliminary and grand finals.

The match was played at West Park Oval in Burnie, 16 km east of Wynyard.

== The Game ==
=== First quarter ===
North Hobart won the toss and kicked to the eastern end of the ground. With the aid of a westerly wind, North Hobart was the dominant team in general play. The Robins managed eleven scoring shots to Wynyard's two, but led by only 19 points at quarter time, 3.8 (26) to 1.1 (7). Some credit for North Hobart's inaccuracy in front of goal is given to strong defensive work by Wynyard's Phillip Dell and David Cox. John Devine was instrumental as ruck-rover around the ground. Late in the quarter, the Cats finally managed a goal against the wind, courtesy of a downfield free kick to West.

=== Second quarter ===
Kicking with the aid of the wind, Wynyard dominated the second quarter. They had scored a goal within the first minute of play, and had overcome their quarter-time deficit after only seven minutes. Wynyard's Leon Clarke started to control the ruck contests after a relatively even battle with his North Hobart opponents in the first quarter, while the forward-line combination of West and captain-coach John Coughlan was dominant. North Hobart, goalless for almost the entire quarter into the wind, managed two late goals, including one by Devine after the half time siren, to bring the margin back to 20 points,. Overall, Wynyard kicked 8.6 (54) to North Hobart's 2.3 (15) in the quarter, to lead 9.7 (61) – 5.11 (41) at half time.

=== Third quarter ===
Kicking with the wind in the third quarter, North Hobart took full advantage. After an early goal to Wynyard, the Robins dominated and regained the lead after fifteen minutes. Devine continued to find himself in open space around the ground, and was very damaging, scoring two goals himself and assisting on three more for the quarter. Dell and Cox were again good in defence for Wynyard – although the Cats twice conceded bouncing goals after leaving the goal square unguarded. North Hobart scored 6.6 (42) to Wynyard's 1.2 (8) in the third quarter, and led by 14 points at three-quarter time: 11.17 (83) to 10.9 (69).

Through the third quarter and into the final quarter, the game began to be marred by some violent clashes off the ball by both sides. Wynyard rover Kevin King in particular was forced to endure substantial scragging, and the media reported that more than six players were king-hit behind play.

=== Fourth quarter ===
The strong wind, which to this stage had seen 17.20 (122) of a total 21.26 (152) kicked to the eastern end of the ground, had waned, and proved less of an advantage to Wynyard in the final quarter.

Two early goals in two minutes saw Wynyard close the margin to less than a goal. Devine scored his fifth goal, spectacularly stealing the ball away from Dell as he juggled a mark at full back. Wynyard continued to attack, and after two consecutive behinds, West scored his sixth goal in the 20th minute to tie the game at 90–90. No further goals were scored: Atkins managed a behind to put the Cats ahead, the Robins rushed a behind to tie the game again, and Templar scored a behind in the 29th minute to put the Cats ahead 92–91. In the final minute of the game, Templar conceded a holding-the-man free kick to Devine 30 yards from goal; Devine's kick into the wind fell short, setting up the controversial finish.

== The Finish ==
=== Collins' mark and the final siren ===
As Devine's kick fell short, a mark was taken in front of a pack by North Hobart full forward David "Dickie" Collins near the tip of the goal square, between 10 and 20 yards from goal on a slight angle; and, the final siren sounded. The order of these two events is a point of contention, but according to umpire Pilgrim – whose decision, by the rules of the game, is final in such cases – Collins did take his mark before the final siren, permitting him to take a kick after the siren to win the game. Collins was reported in the media to have said that he believed he had taken the mark before he heard the siren, while Wynyard captain-coach John Coughlan said that he had heard the siren and seen Pilgrim raise his arms to signal the end of the game before the mark was taken, and he therefore believed the game was now over and that Wynyard had won the premiership by a point.

A Wynyard player knocked the ball from Collins' hands shortly after the mark was taken, and Pilgrim awarded a 15-yard penalty to Collins. It is unclear whether this incident happened before or after Pilgrim heard and acknowledged the siren.

=== Pitch invasion ===
As Wynyard players argued with Pilgrim about whether or not the mark was legitimate, Wynyard fans streamed onto the ground and occupied the western end, surrounding Collins and other players. It is estimated that more than 3,000 of the game's 8,289 attendees were involved in the invasion. North Hobart captain-coach John Devine specifically instructed Collins not to take his kick until a space had been cleared around him.

Umpires, players, team officials, trainers and police did their best to clear a pathway for Collins to take his kick, and after several minutes, they did succeed temporarily; however, Pilgrim did not allow Collins to take his kick at this time because he was not on the correct line with the goal. The crowd again converged on Collins before he could correct his line, and the opportunity was lost. By this stage, the pitch invasion was riotous, with many punches thrown, and umpires, players, team officials, and police were now tasked with restoring order, particularly after Collins' teammate Barry Styles was knocked to the ground and trampled; he was left unconscious with broken fingers and had to be carried from the field on a stretcher.

It was at this stage of the pitch invasion that Wynyard fans pulled down the goal posts at the western end of the ground, the famous scene from which this game earned its nickname, "the Goalpost Final". Pilgrim abandoned the game and left the ground under police protection after he saw that the goalposts had been taken down, making Collins' kick impossible. The last remaining players left the arena shortly afterwards, and Collins, who still had the ball tucked under his guernsey, was the last player to leave the arena, about ten minutes after Pilgrim and under police protection.

With all players and officials off the ground, still nobody knew for sure who had won the game. Pilgrim and Collins would later be driven from the ground in police cars for their protection.

== Aftermath ==
=== Game declared no-decision ===
Half an hour after players had left the arena, match manager Jack Leary made the following announcement to the thousands of fans still awaiting an outcome, on behalf of the members of the T.F.L. Standing Committee who were present on the day:

The umpire states that he had awarded the mark to North Hobart, and that the mark was taken before he heard the siren, and had the crowd not rushed onto the ground, the North Hobart player would have taken his kick. Consequently, the match is a no-decision one.

— Jack Leary, The Mercury

At this stage, only the match had been declared no-decision. The Standing Committee had not yet determined what steps, if any, would be taken to decide the premiership.

=== Premiership declared no-decision ===
The TFL Standing Committee met on the night of Monday 2 October to make a ruling on the premiership.

Play it again? I'll play it on the beach, on a cow paddock, anywhere – we can beat these blokes.

— Wynyard captain-coach John Coughlan, The Mercury

A full replay of the state final at a neutral venue (namely York Park in Launceston) was a potential solution, and each club was approached for its opinion. Wynyard was in favour of a replay match; on 2 October, they were quoted as being satisfied with a game at a neutral venue, but with a different umpire, suggesting a high calibre umpire be brought from Victoria to officiate; the following day, Wynyard instead said it would be happy for Pilgrim to umpire any replay, but that the game should again be played in Burnie. North Hobart, on the other hand, was opposed to playing a replay, stating that the club had fulfilled its obligations to the league for the season, and that to replay the game would vindicate the riotous behaviour of the north-western crowd.

Another option available to the committee was to have allowed Collins to take his potential game-winning kick at a later date. Although the modern laws of the game allow a match to be abandoned after a delay of thirty minutes, this provision was not included in the laws of 1967. Collins himself said that he was surprised that he was not allowed to return to take his kick the following day.

The committee could also have chosen to overturn Pilgrim's decision to pay the mark to Collins, and then awarded the game to Wynyard at the score 13.14 (92) to 12.19 (91), if it was sufficiently convinced that Pilgrim had erred in his judgement that the mark was taken before the siren. Such a decision would not have been without high-level precedent – most notably, the result of the 1907 WAFL Premiership was overturned after a successful protest that a free kick was paid after the half-time siren rather than before it – but such protests were rare after the 1911 rule change which formally enshrined the field umpire's sole responsibility to judge the timing of the siren.

As far as I am concerned, we morally won the game. Wynyard tried to bluff us out of it.

— North Hobart captain-coach John Devine, The Mercury

Although there were no grounds for it in the Laws of Australian Football, some sporting codes would have viewed spectator interference (as was held in this case for removal of the goalposts) as legal grounds for officials to charge Wynyard with spectator interference and a forfeit, awarding the match to North Hobart – giving the committee yet another option.

After its meeting, the Standing Committee agreed to uphold the declaration of no-decision for the game, upheld umpire Pilgrim's assessment that Collins' mark was taken before the final siren, and recommended that the match should not be replayed and that the state premiership should not be awarded. Wynyard was critical of the decision, stating that the committee's ruling was weak, and that a replay should have been recommended. Wynyard also suggested that North Hobart's opposition to replaying the game should have been interpreted as forfeiture.

At a meeting on the night of 3 October, the TANFL officially agreed with the Standing Committee's recommendation. This ended any possibility for a replay, and officially left the 1967 State Premiership unawarded.

=== General aftermath ===
Police superintendent Mackey, who had been watching the game off-duty but became involved in the peace-keeping efforts, stated that the crowd's behaviour was "disgraceful".

Wynyard was critical of umpire Pilgrim's performance, blaming his failure to control the on-field violence, which grew throughout the second half, as a contributing factor to the pitch invasion and the rioting. The NFTA was complimentary of Pilgrim's performance in a difficult situation, and criticised the coastal supporters for their conduct. North Hobart blamed the Wynyard players, rather than the crowd, for inciting the pitch invasion indirectly through their remonstration with Pilgrim after Collins' mark.

The goalposts themselves were left on the ground in front of the grandstand after the pitch invasion. A group of North Hobart fans returned during the night and tried to take one of the posts home to Hobart with them, but police retrieved it before their train left Burnie.

David Collins returned home to find that friends had erected a set of goal posts, decorated in Robins' colours, in his front yard. Collins left West Park Oval with the match ball under his guernsey, and is reported to still have the ball in his possession.

== Precedent and legacy ==
A semi-final between Footscray and North Melbourne in the 1920 Victorian Football Association season ended in near identical circumstances, with Considine prevented from taking a 30-yard kick after the final bell which could have won the game for North Melbourne. That match was also declared no result, and a replay was held the following week.

The game was one of the moments depicted in The Game That Made Australia, a painting by Jamie Cooper which was commissioned for the sport's 150-year anniversary celebrations in 2008. It shows two fans from each club watching on from a suburban style scoreboard bearing the unofficial final score, while two Wynyard fans sneak in front of them carrying a goalpost. Unusually for the painting, the depiction is an idealised representation of the event, rather than being painted directly from an image of the moment.^{Note 3}

The crowd in the act of rioting and removing the goalpost is also a background feature in Cooper's Tasmania's Team of the Century painting. The match has been inducted as a Great Match in the Tasmanian Football Hall of Fame.

== Scorecard ==
1967 Tasmanian State Premiership Final
30 September 1967	Wynyard (NWFU)	v	North Hobart (TANFL)	West Park Oval (crowd: 8,289)
1.1 (7); 9.7 (61); 10.9 (69); 13.14 (92)	Q1; Q2; Q3; Final	3.8 (26); 5.11 (41); 11.17 (83); 12.19 (91)
West 6, Templar 2, Atkins, Clarke, King, Coughlan, Murfet	Goals	Devine 5, Graham 3, Dwyer, Collins, Woolley, Mills, Arnold
Dell, Clarke, Cox, West, King, Wilson, Neal	Best	Devine, Graham, Mills, Brakey, Smith, Deayton, Hawkins

== See also ==
- 1967 TANFL season
- Tasmanian State Premiership

== Footnotes ==
1. North Hobart changed its official nickname from the Robins to the Demons (its current name) during the 1969 season. At the time, the Robins were also colloquially known as the Redlegs.
2. Wynyard's previous NWFU premiership came in 1952, a season when the state premiership was not contested at all.
3. In fact, the guernseys worn by the Wynyard fans in the painting are anachronistic. The painting depicts the modern guernsey of navy and white hoops, whereas in 1967 the Cats wore navy and white vertical thirds.
