= Gus Dobrigh =

Australian rules footballer and coach

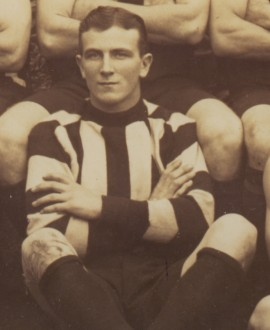
- Dobrigh in 1914

Personal information
- Full name: Laurence Augustine Dobrigh
- Born: 11 February 1893; Huntly, Victoria
- Died: 21 September 1982 (aged 89); Ferntree Gully, Victoria
- Original team: Trafalgar
- Height: 175 cm (5 ft 9 in)
- Weight: 75 kg (165 lb)
- Position: Utility

Playing career^{1}
Years	Club	Games (Goals)
1914–1921	Collingwood	88 (33)

Coaching career
Years	Club	Games (W–L–D)
1925	Northcote	15 (11–4–0)
1926–1927	Preston	38 (21–16–1)
1934	Port Melbourne	18 (6–12–0)
- ^{1} Playing statistics correct to the end of 1921.

Career highlights
- VFL Premiership player 1917

Laurence Augustine "Gus" Dobrigh (11 February 1893 – 21 September 1982) was an Australian rules footballer who played with Collingwood in the Victorian Football League (VFL).

A half forward flanker in Collingwood's 1917 premiership team, Dobrigh was also a three time losing Grand Finalist. He was suspended by his club in 1919 over a payment dispute, but there were incorrect rumours at the time that it was because he had been suspected of playing dead in a game. After finishing with Collingwood at the end of 1921, Dobrigh moved to Port Melbourne in the Victorian Football Association (VFA), where he captained the club to a premiership in 1922; he was again caught up in a bribery scandal, being offered and turning down a significant sum of money by former Footscray player Vern Banbury to play dead in the Grand Final. He was playing coach at Northcote in 1925, then with Preston, for the club's inaugural VFA season in 1926. He would later return to Port Melbourne once his playing days were over, as coach.
