= 1911 VFA season =

35th season of the Victorian Football Association

Overview
- Teams: 10
- Premiers: Essendon; 1st premiership
- Minor premiers: Essendon; 1st minor premiership
- Leading goalkicker: Dave McNamara (Essendon − 81 goals)

The 1911 VFA season was the 35th season of the Victorian Football Association (VFA).

The premiership was won by the Essendon Association Football Club, after it defeated Brunswick by eight points in a rain-affected grand final on 23 September. It was the first premiership won by the club, and it came after they finished second on the ladder in three consecutive seasons without playing in the final match.

== Home-and-away season ==
The home-and-home season was played over eighteen rounds, with each club playing the others twice; then, the top four clubs contested a finals series under the amended Argus system to determine the premiers for the season.

== Ladder ==
Pos	Team	Pld	W	L	D	PF	PA	PP	Pts
1	Essendon (P)	18	16	2	0	1292	732	176.5	64
2	North Melbourne	18	14	4	0	1179	749	157.4	56
3	Prahran	18	13	5	0	1284	890	144.3	52
4	Brunswick	18	12	6	0	1225	815	150.3	48
5	Port Melbourne	18	12	6	0	1044	797	131.0	48
6	Footscray	18	9	9	0	1098	865	126.9	36
7	Williamstown	18	5	13	0	724	975	74.3	20
8	Brighton	18	4	14	0	684	1080	63.3	16
9	Northcote	18	4	14	0	768	1292	59.4	16
10	Preston	18	1	17	0	662	1761	37.6	4

Rules for classification: 1) points; 2) percentage; 3) number of points for.
(P) Premiers

== Finals ==
=== Semi-finals ===
	Semi-finals
Saturday, 2 September	North Melbourne 3.7 (25)	def. by	Brunswick 5.10 (40)	North Melbourne Recreation Reserve (crowd: 15,000)
Saturday, 9 September	Essendon 8.9 (57)	def.	Prahran 7.8 (50)	North Melbourne Recreation Reserve (crowd: 15,000)

=== Final ===
	Final
Saturday, 16 September	Essendon 9.9 (63)	def. by	Brunswick 10.5 (65)	North Melbourne Recreation Reserve (crowd: 20,000)

=== Grand Final ===
1911 VFA Grand Final
Saturday, 23 September	Essendon	def.	Brunswick	North Melbourne Recreation Reserve (crowd: 30,000)
1.3 (9); 2.5 (17); 4.10 (34); 4.10 (34)	Q1; Q2; Q3; Final	0.1 (1); 1.3 (9); 1.4 (10); 3.8 (26)	Umpires: Kendall
McNamara 2, Gough, McCann	Goals	Chase 2, McKenzie
Maine (leg)	Injuries

== Notable events ==
- In the match between North Melbourne and Preston on 1 July, North Melbourne was penalised for having too many players on the field after Preston called for a head count early in the second quarter. North Melbourne was leading 7.5 (47) to 2.1 (13) at the time, and its score was reset to zero. Nevertheless, North Melbourne still went on to win the game 10.9 (69) to 7.6 (48).
- In the first final between Essendon and Brunswick on 16 September, Dave McNamara (Essendon) had a place kick after the final bell from 40 yards out directly in front, which would have won the match and the premiership if successful. Spectators streamed onto the ground before he took his kick, but he kicked before waiting for a space to be cleared and missed the goal by six feet, resulting in a two-point win for Brunswick and forcing a Grand Final the following week. Essendon protested the result on the basis of interference from the crowd, and McNamara stated that the encroachment of the crowd prevented him from taking as long a run-up as he had desired; but, he was deemed to have voluntarily taken his kick without waiting for more space to be cleared (as he was entitled to do), and he was not interfered with after starting his run-up, so the protest was dismissed.
- Brunswick captain Jack McKenzie was approached to throw the Grand Final in Essendon's favour. He was offered £150 if he, Chase and Johnson all "played stiff" during the game. McKenzie refused the offer and reported it to the Association, and the Grand Final is not believed to have ultimately been compromised by any form of bribery. This was the second match-fixing scandal in Melbourne football in two years, with two players from League club Carlton banned for match fixing in 1910.
- Dave McNamara (Essendon) was the Association's leading goalkicker for the season. Including finals, he set a new Association record of 81 goals, breaking the record of 76 goals set by Frank Caine (North Melbourne) in 1910.

== See also ==
- Victorian Football Association/Victorian Football League history (1877–2008)
- List of VFA premiers
