= Sydney Sykes =

Australian rules footballer

Personal information
- Full name: Sidney Mellor Sykes
- Born: 28 February 1882; South Melbourne, Victoria
- Died: 19 August 1949 (aged 67); South Melbourne, Victoria
- Original team: Prahran

Playing career^{1}
Years	Club	Games (Goals)
1905–06	South Melbourne	7 (5)
- ^{1} Playing statistics correct to the end of 1906.

Sidney Mellor Sykes (28 February 1882 – 19 August 1949) was an Australian rules footballer who played with South Melbourne in the Victorian Football League (VFL).

He also played for Victorian Football Association club Prahran, notably kicking 12.5 of his team's total of 12.17 in its match against North Melbourne, at Toorak Park, on 24 August 1907.
