= Croxton Park =

Protected area in Leicestershire, England

Coordinates: 52.84°N 0.785°W

- Site of Special Scientific Interest
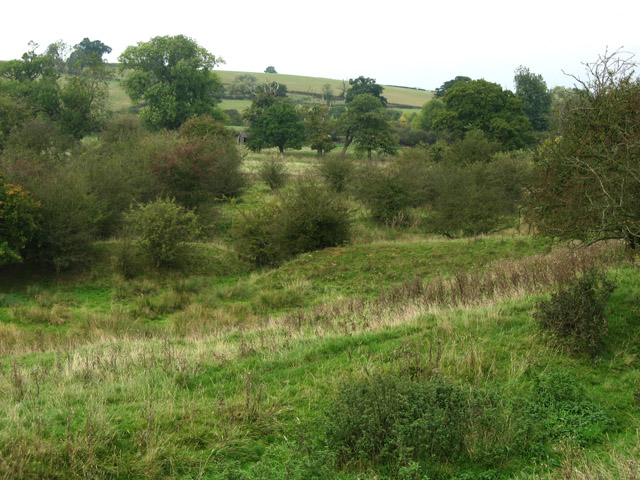
- Location of Croxton Park.
- Area of search: Leicestershire
- Grid reference: SK 819 276
- Interest: Biological
- Area: 97.3 hectares
- Notification date: 1986
- Location map: Magic Map

Croxton Park is a 97.3-hectare (240-acre) biological Site of Special Scientific Interest south-west of Croxton Kerrial in Leicestershire.

This medieval park has unimproved rough grassland with a scatter of ancient oaks and hawthorns. The breeding birds are diverse, and more than ninety lichen species have been recorded, including many which are uncommon.

A public footpath crosses the site but much of it is private land with no public access.
