= Thornton Clarke =

Australian rules footballer (1891–1916)

Personal information
- Full name: Thornton Gainsborough Clarke
- Nickname: Tom
- Born: 27 November 1891; Essendon, Victoria
- Died: 19 July 1916 (aged 24); Fromelles, France
- Original team: Mt Lyell
- Height: 180 cm (5 ft 11 in)
- Weight: 74 kg (163 lb)

Playing career^{1}
Years	Club	Games (Goals)
1911	Fitzroy (VFL)	4 (0)
1910–1915	Essendon Association (VFA)	88 (218)
Total		92 (218)
- ^{1} Playing statistics correct to the end of 1915.

Career highlights
- VFA Leading goalkicker 1914

Thornton Gainsborough "Tom" Clarke (27 November 1891 – 19 July 1916) was an Australian rules footballer who played with Fitzroy in the Victorian Football League (VFL), and the Essendon Association Football Club in the Victorian Football Association (VFA).

== Family ==
The son of Arthur Clarke (-1934), and Rebecca Ann Clarke (-1940), née Cooke, Thornton Gainsborough Clarke was born in Essendon, Victoria on 27 November 1891.

He married Annie Muriel Walker (1889–1976) on 16 June 1915.

Their son, Thornton Vernon Clarke – later, Flight Lieutenant Thornton Vernon Clarke, DFC (408954) – was born on 4 March 1916, after Clarke had left Australia with the First AIF.

== Football ==
=== Fitzroy (VFL) ===
Granted a permit from Mount Lyell to Fitzroy on 17 May 1911, 19-year-old Clarke played four First XVIII games for Fitzroy in the 1911 VFL season.

=== Essendon A (VFA) ===
He played in 88 games and scored 218 goals over six seasons (1910 to 1915) for Essendon Association Football Club in the Victorian Football Association (VFA).

In 1913 and 1914 he was the VFA's leading goalkicker, with 58 and 46 goals respectively.

== Military service ==
Qualified as an electrical engineer, and employed at G. Weymouth Pty. Ltd., Electrical Engineers, in Richmond, he enlisted in the First AIF in July 1915, and served with the 60th Infantry Battalion.

== Death ==
External videos
- Thornton Gainsborough Clarke: A video profile of Thornton Clarke, killed at the Battle of Fromelles in 1916: St Clare's College, Waverley: on Youtube (5 September 2018).

Clarke was killed in action on 19 July 1916, soon after arriving on the Western Front, during the Battle of Fromelles.

Initially listed as "missing", he was officially declared "killed in action", by a Court of Enquiry held in France on 4 August 1917.

Buried in a mass grave at the time of his death, his remains were never recovered, and he is commemorated at the V.C. Corner Australian Cemetery and Memorial in Fromelles, France.

== See also ==
- List of Victorian Football League players who died on active service
