= West Melbourne Football Club =

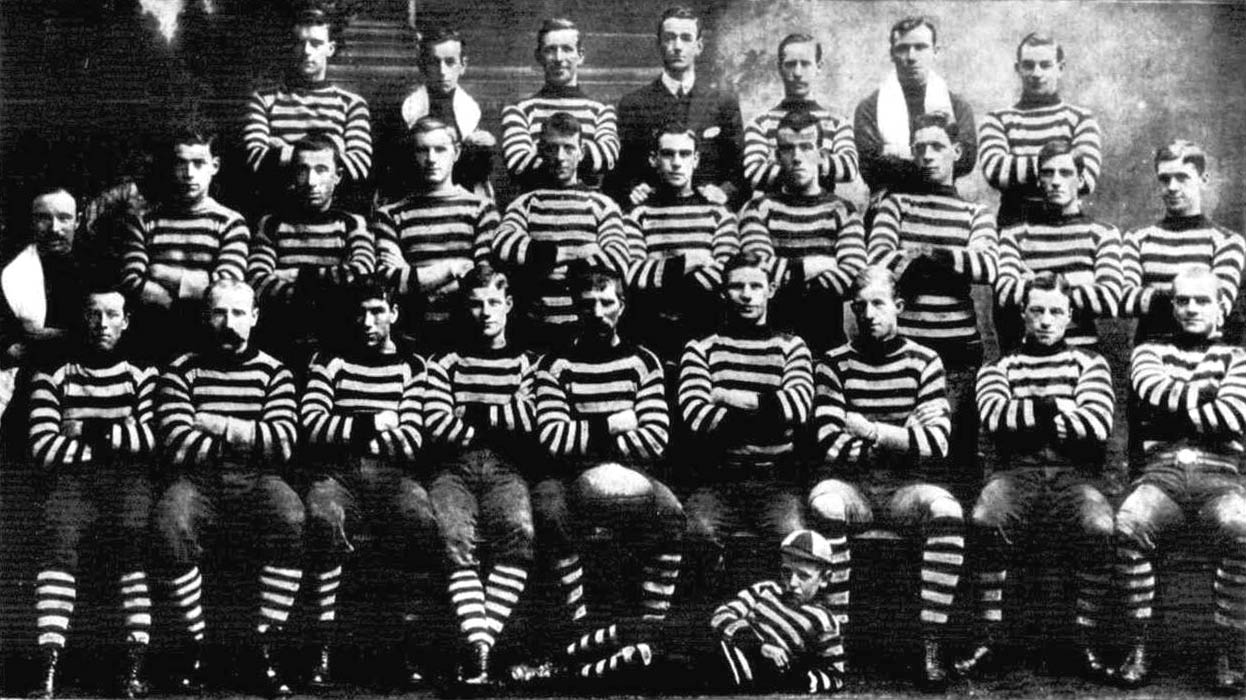

Names
- Full name: West Melbourne Football Club
- Nickname: Wests

Club details
- Founded: 1874; 152 years ago
- Dissolved: 1908; 118 years ago
- Colours: Red White
- Competition: Victorian Football Association (1879–1880, 1899–1907)
- Premierships: VFA (1); 1906; VJFA (1); 1898
- Ground: North Melbourne Recreation Reserve (1899–1906); East Melbourne Cricket Ground (1907)

Uniforms
Home

The West Melbourne Football Club was an Australian rules football club which played in the Victorian Football Association (VFA). Its senior side competed in the VFA from 1878 through 1908, its peak as a club coming after it won the 1906 premiership. After disbanding at the end of the 1908 season, its identity was essentially overtaken by the North Melbourne Football Club, whose uniform briefly reflected the acquisition in the years following.

== History ==
The West Melbourne Football Club was formed on the evening of 10 April 1874, at the James Watt Hotel on Spencer Street, with Thomas McPherson appointed its inaugural president.

By 1877, it was the premier junior level club in the VFA, and from 1878, West Melbourne began competing in the association as a senior club, remaining there until the end of the 1880 season.
The club returned to junior level in 1881.

After winning the premiership with an undefeated record in 1898 in the Victorian Junior Football Association, the club returned to senior level in the VFA in 1899, enjoying a longer stint at a higher grade. The club won its first and only senior premiership in 1906 by defeating Footscray in the Grand Final, 7.8 (50) to 5.9 (39).

As juniors, the club played at the West Melbourne Recreation Reserve, but it was not up to Association standards; so, upon rejoining the VFA in 1899, the club became based at the North Melbourne Cricket Ground, sharing it with the North Melbourne Football Club. In 1907, the club moved to the East Melbourne Cricket Ground, sharing it with the VFL's Essendon Football Club.

At the end of 1907, West Melbourne merged with North Melbourne. The combined club applied to join the Victorian Football League – although even before they had applied, the merger had been likely owing to West Melbourne's weak financial position, and West Melbourne's eviction from the East Melbourne Cricket Ground after only one year, owing to the University Football Club being leased the ground. The combined North Melbourne/West Melbourne application was rejected by the VFL, and the VFA expelled both clubs for their disloyalty and the merger never formally took place. North Melbourne and West Melbourne both disbanded, but North Melbourne was revived under a new committee shortly afterwards, and wore a red sash on a blue and white guernsey in 1908 to reflect the colours of both North and West Melbourne.

At the end of the 1908 season, an independent West Melbourne club was revived under the new name City of Melbourne. It applied for, but was not granted admission to the VFA, and it disbanded. North Melbourne was upset by the move. The red sash representing West Melbourne's history was later dropped from North Melbourne's guernsey.

== Notable players ==
- Lou Armstrong (Essendon)
- Dave Ferguson (Essendon)
- George Holden (Fitzroy)
- Bill S. Johnson (Essendon)
- Bert Ryan (Essendon)
- Jimmy Smith (St Kilda)
