= Billy Rudd (Australian footballer) =

Australian rules footballer

Personal information
- Full name: William Victor James Rudd
- Born: 27 February 1894; Horsham, Victoria
- Died: 23 July 1961 (aged 67); Heidelberg, Victoria
- Original team: South Yarra
- Height: 185 cm (6 ft 1 in)
- Weight: 82 kg (181 lb)

Playing career^{1}
Years	Club	Games (Goals)
1917–18	Richmond	21 (8)
- ^{1} Playing statistics correct to the end of 1918.

William Victor James Rudd (27 February 1894 – 23 July 1961) was an Australian rules footballer who played with Richmond in the Victorian Football League (VFL). Billy served in WW1, in the 6th Battalion (Australia), and was discharged from the war in 1916, after being shot in the chest. His short football career with the Richmond Football Club only lasted two years.
