= Jack O'Brien (footballer, born 1898) =

Australian rules footballer

Personal information
- Full name: John Daniel O'Brien
- Born: 17 August 1898; Eaglehawk, Victoria
- Died: 30 May 1966 (aged 67); Heidelberg Repatriation Hospital, Heidelberg, Victoria
- Original team: Footscray Juniors
- Height: 184 cm (6 ft 0 in)
- Weight: 85 kg (187 lb)

Playing career^{1}
Years	Club	Games (Goals)
1920	Essendon	14 (15)
1921–1924	Footscray (VFA)	64 (130)
1926	Yarrawonga	
1927	Kingsville	
1928	Footscray (VFL)	5 (12)
1928	Coburg	2 (5)
1929–1931	Williamstown	35 (84)
- ^{1} Playing statistics correct to the end of 1930s.

John Daniel O'Brien (17 August 1898 – 30 May 1966) was an Australian rules footballer who played with Essendon and Footscray in the Victorian Football League (VFL).

== Football ==
O'Brien began playing senior football for Essendon in the VFL in 1920, but in 1921 crossed to Footscray in the Victorian Football Association without a clearance.

He played as a half-forward for Footscray for the next four seasons and was part of two premierships.

In 1925, when Footscray joined the VFL, O'Brien was unable to remain with the club due to his suspension from the VFL for leaving Essendon without a clearance, and he consequently played for country and junior clubs for the three-year period of his disqualification from 1925 until 1927.

O'Brien successfully sued Footscray for £70 in potential match payments that he missed in 1925 and 1926 as a result of the suspension, owing to a clause to that effect in his original agreement with Footscray which covered the eventuality of the club joining the VFL.

After his suspension ended, he played five VFL matches for Footscray in 1928 before transferring to Coburg in the VFA later in the season.

He then crossed to Williamstown where he played 35 games and kicked 84 goals and was leading goalkicker at the Club in 1929 with 32 goals and in 1930 with 50 goals when O'Brien was captain-coach. He was replaced as coach in 1931 and then transferred to Newport early in the season. His younger brother, Wally O'Brien, also played at Williamstown in the same period. O'Brien had been wounded in Egypt during World War I and eventually died in Heidelberg Repatriation Hospital in May, 1966, at the age of 67.

== Military service ==
Having enlisted on 20 July 1917, he served overseas in the First AIF with the 5th Australian Infantry Battalion.

== Death ==
He died at the Heidelberg Repatriation Hospital, in Heidelberg, Victoria, on 30 May 1966.
