= East Melbourne Cricket Ground =

Former sports venue in Victoria, Australia

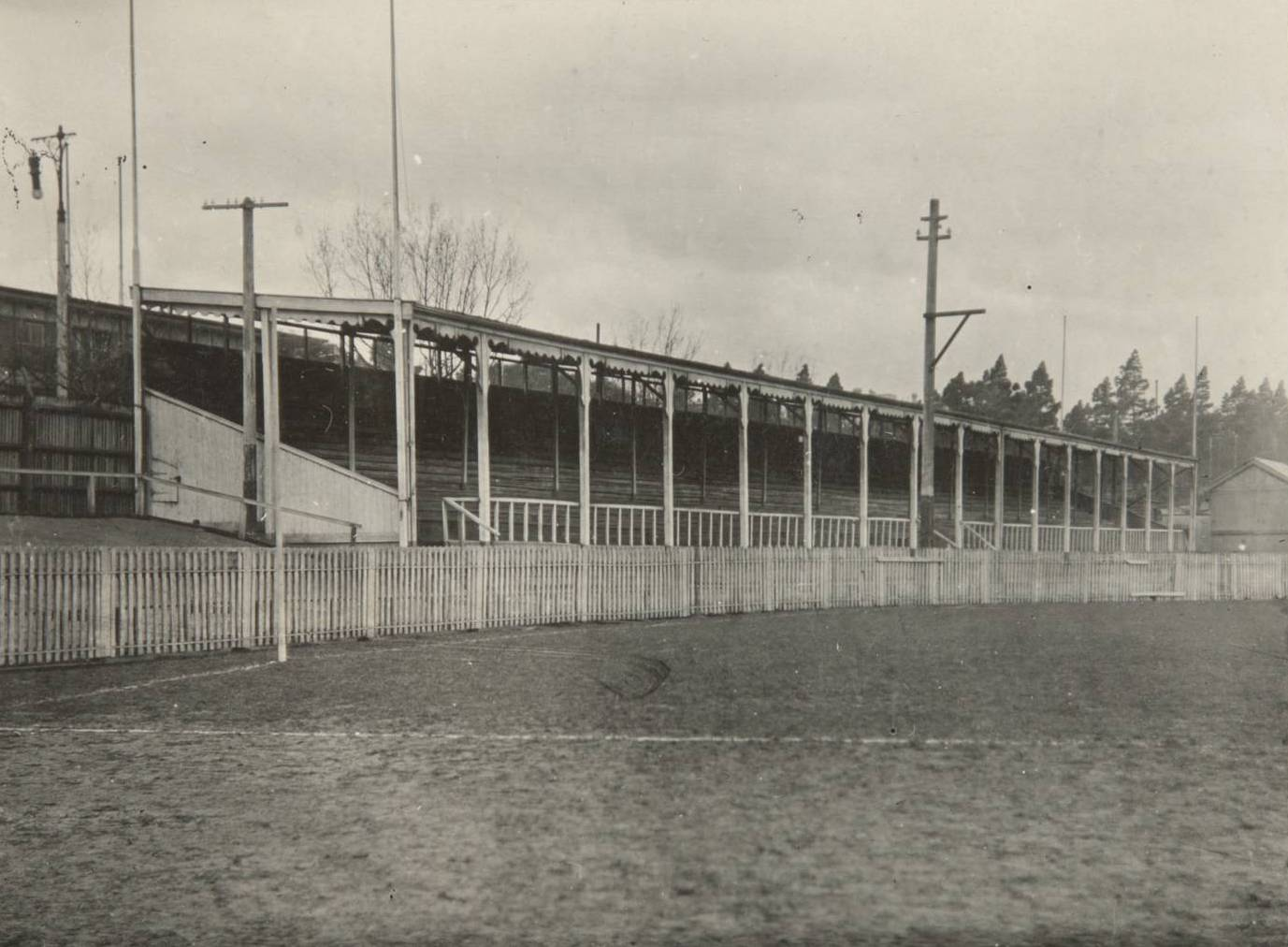
- The EMCG in its final season of use in 1921
- Interactive map of East Melbourne Cricket Ground
- Address: Cnr Jolimont Rd & Jolimont Pde; East Melbourne, Victoria
- Coordinates: 37°49′2″S 144°58′40″E
- Surface: Grass

Construction
- Opened: 1860; 166 years ago
- Closed: 1921; 105 years ago
- Demolished: 1922; 104 years ago

Tenants
- East Melbourne Cricket Club (unknown–1921); East Melbourne Football Club (1878–1882); Essendon Football Club (1882–1921); University Football Club (1908–1910); North Melbourne Football Club (1897); West Melbourne Football Club (1907); Melbourne City Football Club (1912–1913)

The East Melbourne Cricket Ground (EMCG) was an Australian rules football and cricket venue located the Victorian suburb of East Melbourne.

Located at the southwest corner of Jolimont Road and Jolimont Parade (now known as Wellington Parade South), the ground was host to many sporting events during the city of Melbourne's early existence. In addition to Australian rules football and cricket, the ground occasionally hosted soccer matches.

Its closure in 1921 was predicated by the annexure of the land by Victorian Railways to enable stabling and marshalling of trains as part of the electrification of Melbourne's metropolitan rail service.

== History ==
The ground was opened in 1860. It adjoined the Melbourne Cricket Ground and was not far from the Richmond Cricket Ground, all three grounds being sited in the area formerly known as Captain Lonsdale's Cow Paddock, now Yarra Park.

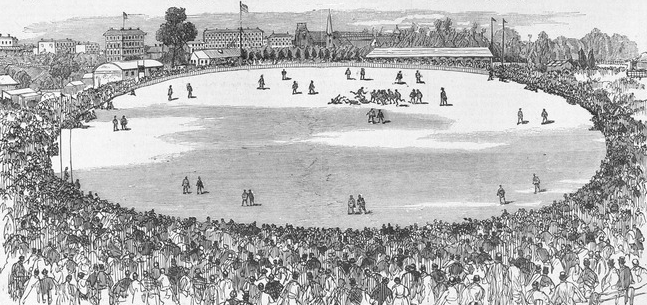
The East Melbourne Cricket Ground being used for an intercolonial football match in 1879.

=== Cricket ===
East Melbourne Cricket Club was the most successful member of the Victorian Cricket Association (VCA) during the 19th Century and early 20th Century, winning more than half of the VCA's Premierships during that period. The club was formed in 1857 as the Abbotsford Cricket Club but they soon changed their name as part of a push to use the East Melbourne ground. The team mainly consisted of Scotch College old boys.

Four first-class cricket games were played at the ground in the 1880s, including the Smokers v Non-Smokers match, in which the Non-Smokers made 803, at the time a world record innings score.

Season	Teams	Date	Result	Ref
1880–81	Victoria v South Australia	12–13, 15 November 1880	Victoria won by 7 wickets	
1882–83	Victoria v South Australia	24, 26–27 March 1883	Victoria won by an innings and 98 runs	
1886–87	Smokers v Non-Smokers	17–19, 21 March 1887	Match drawn	
1888–89	Victoria v Tasmania	1–5 January 1889	Victoria won by 9 wickets	

=== Australian rules football ===
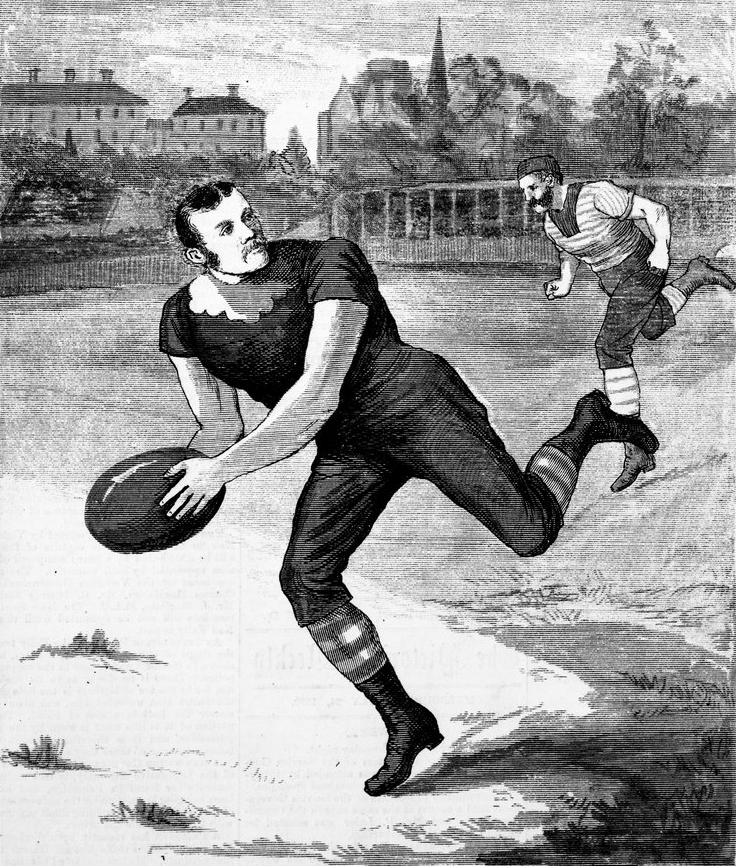
Early Carlton champion George Coulthard running with the ball against Geelong during the 1880 VFA season on 17 July

The oval was used for Australian rules football games during the winter months from 1878. The ground also hosted the first-ever interstate representative football match, on 1 July 1879, between Victoria - represented by the Victorian Football Association (VFA) - and South Australia. The match was attended by more than 10,000 people. It also hosted the first intercollegiate football match in Melbourne, played on 21 July 1881 between teams from the University of Melbourne colleges Trinity and Ormond.

Tenant football clubs of the ground included:

- East Melbourne Football Club, which used the ground until it disbanded in mid-1882.
- Essendon Football Club: despite the ground being 6 miles (10 km) away from the suburb of Essendon, the club moved to the ground in 1882 after East Melbourne folded, and used it in both the VFA and the VFL from 1882 to 1915, and from 1918 until its closure at the end of 1921.
- North Melbourne Football Club used the ground during the 1897 VFA season due to upgrading works on its usual home ground, the Arden Street Oval. The club also played multiple Queen's Birthday matches at the ground, and one game there in 1891 when Arden Street was flooded.
- West Melbourne Football Club moved to the ground for the 1907 VFA season, and disbanded the following year.
- Melbourne University Football Club played there from 1908 to 1910 in the VFL; the club was evicted from the ground before the 1911 season following a dispute with Essendon over rent.
- Melbourne City Football Club used it during its two years in the VFA, 1912 and 1913; Melbourne City lost all 36 matches it played in those two seasons, and folded at the end of 1913.

The ground hosted 426 senior matches in the recognised top level of Victorian football - 201 matches in the VFA and 225 matches in the VFL/AFL - in 42 seasons of competition. The VFL held finals in the 1897 and 1901 finals series and the 1900 Grand Final at the ground, and the VFA held the 1896 premiership play-off match at the ground.

It also held 30 VFA finals between 1903 and 1921.

As a venue for football, the East Melbourne Cricket Ground had an unusual quirk that the field sloped downhill towards the railway end, but was often affected by a strong wind which blew to the pavilion end.

The record football crowd at the venue was 36,185 for a VFA match between Essendon and South Melbourne in 1891, the record attendance for a match at that time.

The VFL record was 20,181 for the 1900 Grand Final, with the record for a VFL home and away match being 18,000, set twice in 1921.

=== Soccer ===
Occasionally, soccer was played at the oval. The best known use for the sport were the interstate representative matches between the colonies of Victoria and New South Wales in the 1880s. Four matches were played between 1883 and 1887 with three taking place at the East Melbourne Cricket Ground with the other being played at the South Melbourne Cricket Ground that ended in a nil-all draw.

Date	Teams	Result	Attendance	Ref
16 August 1883	Victoria v New South Wales	2 – 2	2000	
16 July 1885	Victoria v New South Wales	4 – 0	600	
16 July 1887	Victoria v New South Wales	2 – 2	300	

=== Lacrosse ===
The ground was occasionally used as a venue for lacrosse, and hosted Victoria's first intercolonial lacrosse match on 1 September 1888, against South Australia (the first intercolonial match in Australia was played between Queensland and New South Wales a year earlier). The match was not largely attended, due in part to the cold and showery weather on the day, with Victoria winning the match by 5 goals to 1.

== Closure ==
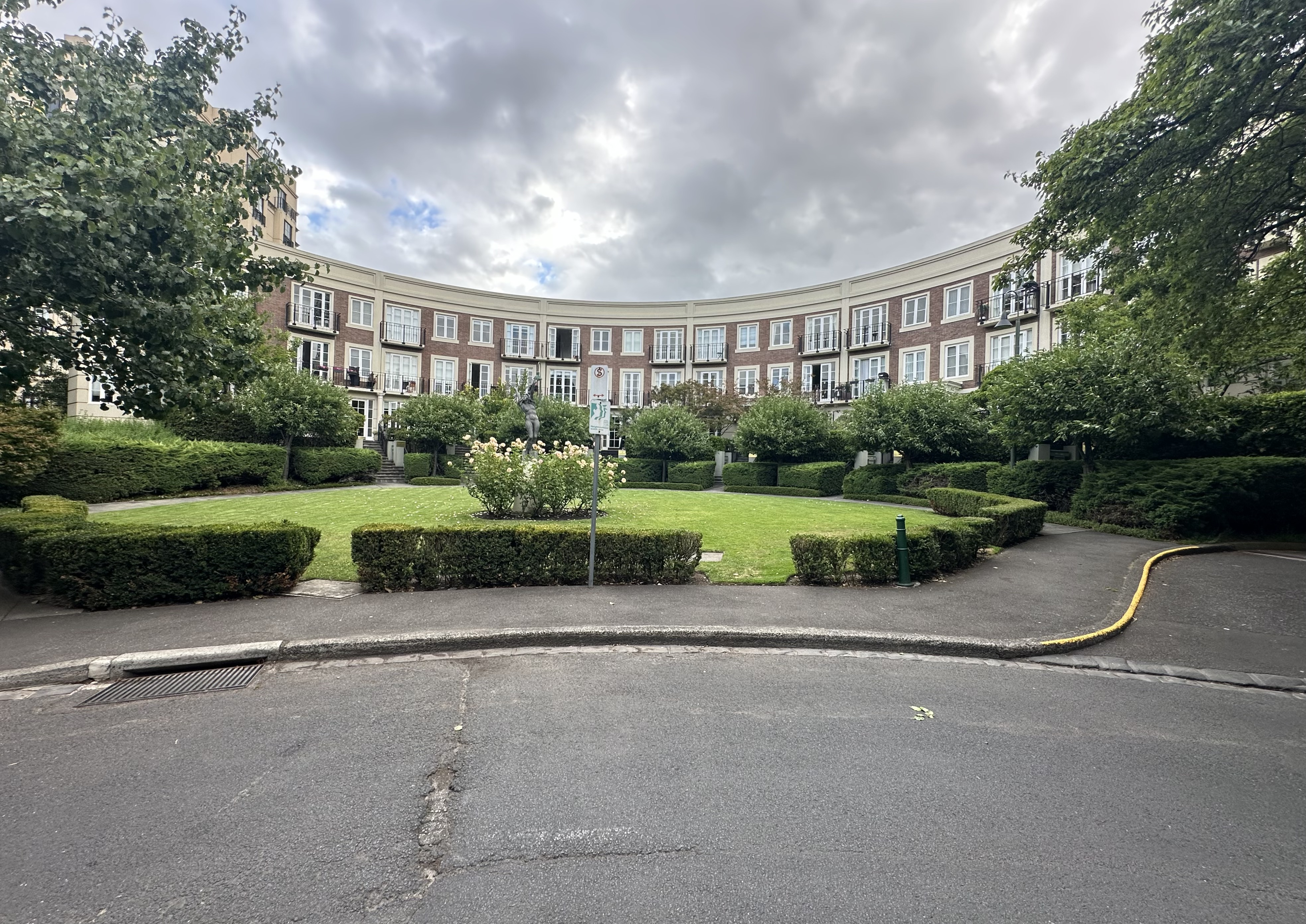
The former site of the East Melbourne Cricket Ground, pictured in 2026

After the 1921 football season, the ground was closed and then demolished to make way for an extension of the Jolimont Yard railway sidings.

The East Melbourne Cricket Club subsequently amalgamated with the Hawthorn Cricket Club to form the Hawthorn-East Melbourne Cricket Club, and moved to Hawthorn's Glenferrie Oval; one of the wooden stands was moved from East Melbourne to Glenferrie Oval, where it stood until 1965, when it was replaced by the Dr A.S. Ferguson Stand.

After the Essendon Football Club lost the use of the ground, it initially tried to move to the North Melbourne Recreation Reserve, resulting in a major off-field political struggle between the Essendon Association and North Melbourne Football Clubs, the VFL and the VFA: it ultimately moved to the Essendon Recreation Reserve.

The former site of the ground has now been taken over by a housing estate, a feature of which is a semi-circular housing block with a tower designed to look like an ersatz football pavilion. The remaining part of the oval in front of that block is now a park.

== See also ==
- History of Australian rules football in Victoria (1853–1900)
