= Melbourne City Football Club (VFA) =

Former Australian football club

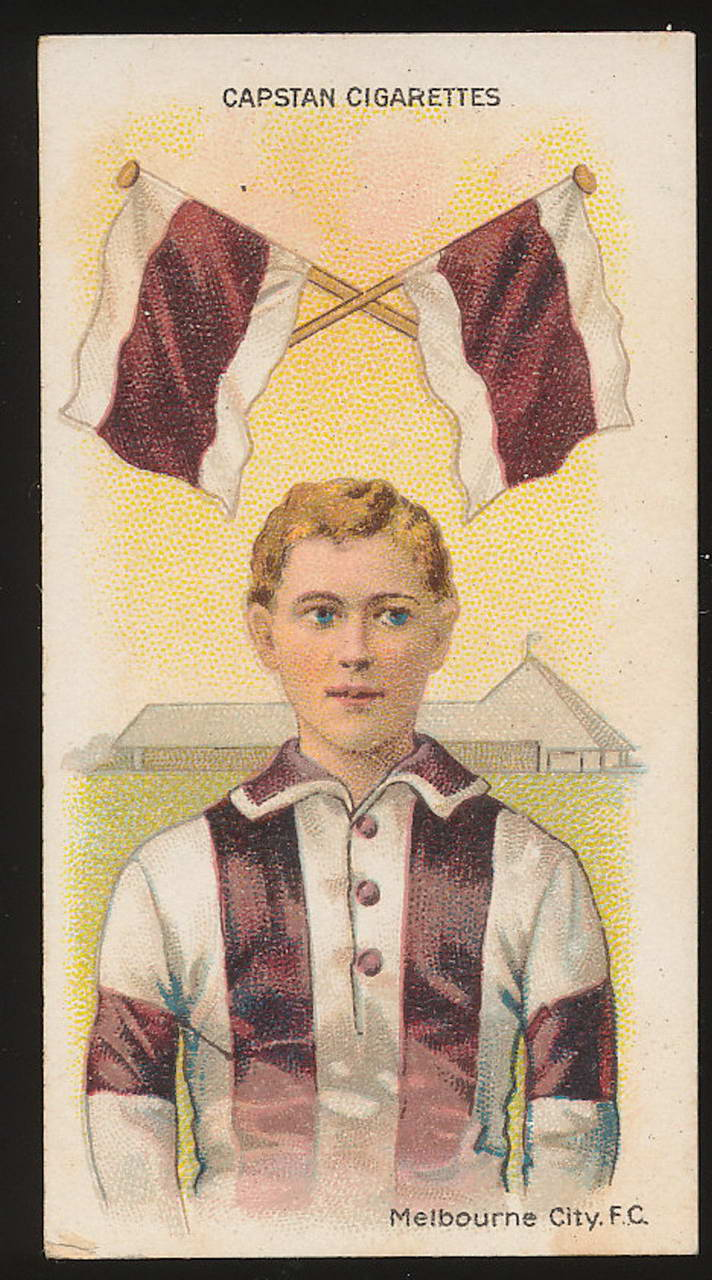

Names
- Full name: Melbourne City Football Club
- Nickname(s): City, City Men

Club details
- Founded: Early 1912; 114 years ago
- Dissolved: 1 December 1913; 112 years ago
- Colours: Dark red/claret White
- Competition: Victorian Football Association 1912–1913
- Ground: East Melbourne Cricket Ground

The Melbourne City Football Club was an Australian rules football club which played in the Victorian Football Association (VFA) in 1912 and 1913, failing to win any games during its two seasons. The club played its home matches at the East Melbourne Cricket Ground.

== History ==
=== Formation ===
In the first decade of the 20th century, the Victorian Football Association was strategically determined to field a club based in inner Melbourne to boost its patronage; the Association had mostly represented outer and suburban Melbourne since the majority of its central clubs had formed the breakaway Victorian Football League in 1897, and had further lost its most central club, Richmond, to the League in 1908. Since 1908, the Association had tried to convince North Melbourne to become its inner-city team, but without success.

Finally, for the 1912 season, the Melbourne City Football Club was established as the inner-city club after the Preston Football Club left the VFA. The club was based at the East Melbourne Cricket Ground, after having also considered the Friendly Societies' Ground (the site of present day Olympic Park) as a home venue. The club wore a dark red coloured guernsey (described as "claret" in contemporary sources) with white shoulders.

Under rules in the Victorian Junior Football Association (VJFA), all clubs had to have a reserves alignment to a VFA team, and the Yarraville Football Club was forced to align with Melbourne City. Both clubs retained their name, colours and home ground, although the VJFA dropped the requirement for a reserves alignment in 1913.

=== VFA ===
In its two seasons in the Association, Melbourne City was uncompetitive. It finished last in both seasons, losing all thirty-six premiership games it played; a loss by seven points against Port Melbourne in 1913 was its best result. The club's thirty-six consecutive losses was a VFA record until Sandringham lost forty-four consecutive matches from 1940–1945. The club did record comfortable wins in pre-season practice matches against junior clubs in both seasons, indicating the club played at a competitive junior standard, but at well short of senior standard.

The club was in the heart of League territory, so it was competing more directly with the League than any other Association club; as such, it struggled to draw fans or players from its local area, resulting in low interest and an uncompetitive playing list. These inherent handicaps left the club with little hope of improvement; so, on 1 December 1913, Melbourne City formally resigned from the Association, and disbanded as a club.

== Records ==
=== Team records ===
Record	Total	Game
Highest score	12.13 (85)	vs Prahran, Round 12, 1912, at East Melbourne Cricket Ground
Lowest score	1.8 (14)	vs Williamstown, Round 11, 1912, at Williamstown Cricket Ground
Lowest score	2.2 (14)	vs Brighton, Round 6, 1913, at Brighton Beach Oval
Highest score conceded	25.22 (172)	vs Essendon (A), Round 14, 1912, at Windy Hill
Lowest score conceded	5.11 (41)	vs Brighton, Round 6, 1913, at Brighton Beach Oval
Biggest loss	141 points	vs Essendon (A), Round 14, 1912, at Windy Hill

=== Head-to-head results ===
Club	Played	Won	Lost	Drew	Win %	Highest	Lowest
Brighton	4	0	4	0	0.0	8.11 (59) – 1912	2.2 (14) – 1913
Brunswick	4	0	4	0	0.0	12.6 (78) – 1912	4.15 (39) – 1913
Essendon (A)	4	0	4	0	0.0	5.10 (40) – 1913	3.7 (25) – 1912
Footscray	4	0	4	0	0.0	7.8 (50) – 1912	2.8 (20) – 1913
North Melbourne	4	0	4	0	0.0	7.7 (49) – 1913	3.5 (23) – 1912
Northcote	4	0	4	0	0.0	6.11 (47) – 1912	4.4 (28) – 1913
Port Melbourne	4	0	4	0	0.0	8.11 (59) – 1912	3.12 (30) – 1913
Prahran	4	0	4	0	0.0	12.13 (85) – 1912	5.10 (40) – 1912
Williamstown	4	0	4	0	0.0	7.8 (50) – 1913	1.8 (14) – 1912

== Seasons ==
Premiers	Grand Finalist	Minor premiers	Finals appearance	Wooden spoon

Year	Finish	W	L	D	Coach	Captain	Best and fairest	Leading goalkicker	Ref
1912	10th	0	18	0					
1913	10th	0	18	0					
