= Vern Banbury =

Australian rules footballer

Personal information
- Full name: Vernon Albert Banbury
- Born: 21 August 1890; Launceston, Tasmania
- Died: 20 November 1950 (aged 60); Collingwood, Victoria
- Height: 180 cm (5 ft 11 in)
- Weight: 73 kg (161 lb)

Playing career^{1}
| Years | Club | Games (Goals) |
| 1909–1910 | St Kilda | 3 (1) |
- ^{1} Playing statistics correct to the end of 1910.

Vernon Albert Banbury (21 August 1890 – 20 November 1950) was an Australian rules footballer.

== Playing career ==
Banbury played three matches for St Kilda in the Victorian Football League (VFL) during the 1909 and 1910 VFL seasons.

He later played for Footscray in the Victorian Football Association (VFA). Playing against Port Melbourne in 1912 he kicked the ball into the goalposts seven times, which is an Australian rules football record.

In 1914 Banbury was sacked by Footscray in the aftermath of the club's loss in the 1914 VFA Grand Final.

After the 1922 VFA Grand Final, Banbury was accused by a number of Port Melbourne players of paying money to throw the match in Footscray's favour. Banbury subsequently received a life ban from the VFA. He was made a life member of Footscray the following year. In 2010, Banbury was an inaugural inductee into the Western Bulldogs Hall of Fame.
