= Essendon Association Football Club =

Essendon Association

Names
- Full name: Essendon Football Club
- Former name(s): Essendon Town Football Club
- Nickname(s): Essendon A, Dreadnoughts

Club details
- Founded: 1900
- Dissolved: 1921; 104 years ago
- Colours: Black Red
- Competition: Victorian Football Association
- Premierships: VFA (2): 1911; 1912
- Ground(s): Essendon Recreation Reserve

Uniforms
Home

Essendon (Association) Football Club (often shortened to Essendon 'A') was an Australian rules football club which played in the Victorian Football Association (VFA) from 1900 until 1921. The Dreadnoughts wore black and red, and played their home games at the Essendon Recreation Reserve (known today as Windy Hill). The club was originally formed as Essendon Town (1900–1904), in order to distinguish them from the Essendon Football Club that played in the Victorian Football League (VFL).

== History ==
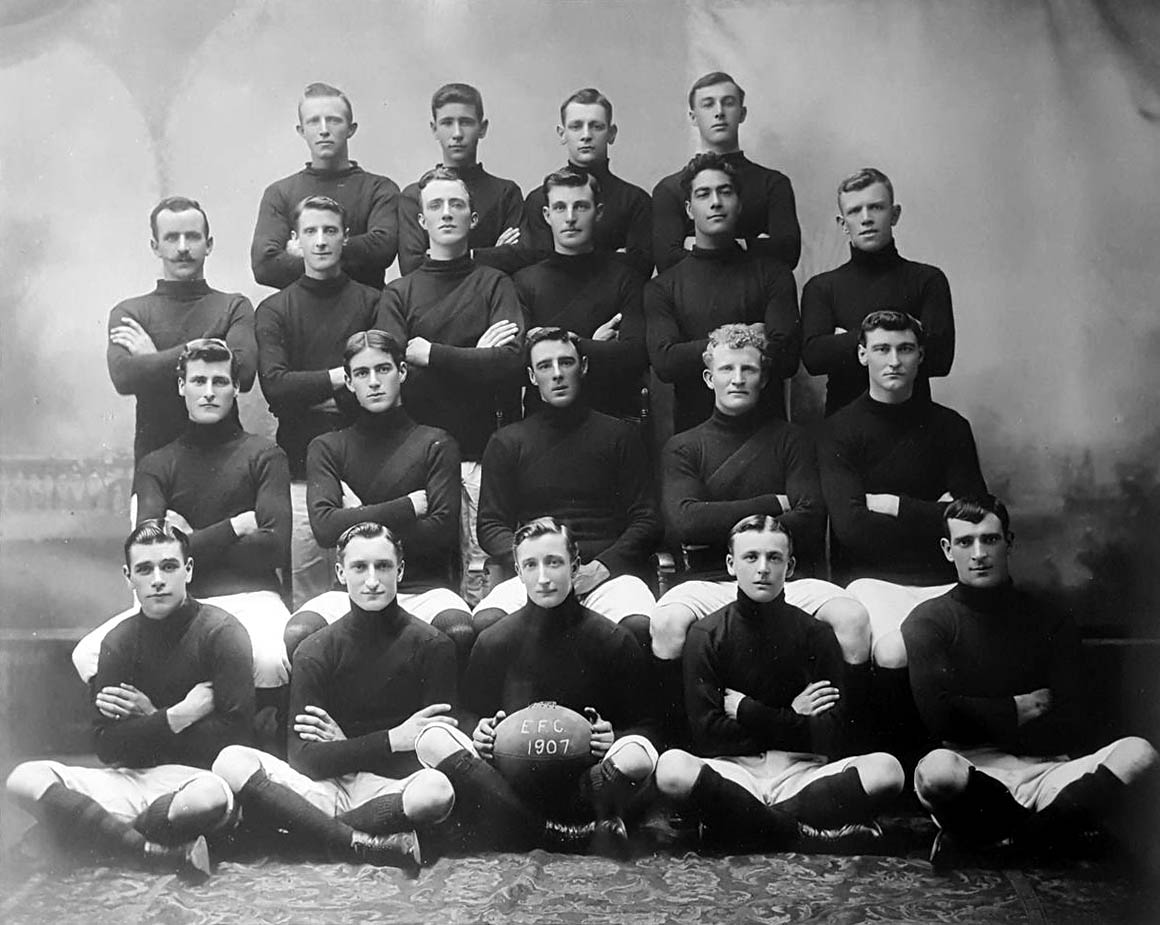
Essendon Association team of 1907

The club was formed as Essendon Town in 1900 and joined the VFA that year. Essendon already had a team which competed in the VFL but many locals protested that they were based at East Melbourne instead of Essendon. The "Essendon Town Football Club" came about as a result, a side which would play their home games in the district. A winless season in 1903 meant that they took home their first wooden spoon.

In 1905, the club officially changed its name to the "Essendon Football Club", the same name as the VFL club. To distinguish it from the VFL club, the club was referred to as Essendon (Association), Essendon (V.F.A.) or Essendon (A.) wherever there was confusion.

The club's most successful period came between 1908 and 1914 when they competed in the finals each year and won back-to-back premierships in 1911 and 1912 – coincidentally, Essendon (League) won the VFL premiership in both of those years. In the 1912 premiership season, Essendon Association's full-forward Dave McNamara became the first VFA footballer to kick over 100 goals in a season.

The club was left without a home ground and with diminished local support when the Essendon League club relocated to Essendon Recreation Reserve in October 1921; with no alternatives, the club effectively disbanded in December 1921.

In 1922, most Essendon Association players moved to the reformed North Melbourne Football Club. North Melbourne had disbanded during the 1921 VFA season, assuming that they would be amalgamating with the Essendon League team. This did not work out, and, at the end of 1921, the North Melbourne club had a ground but no team, and Essendon Association had a team but no ground. North Melbourne was readmitted to the Association in January 1922 with the prospect of amalgamation with Essendon Association. The amalgamation was eventually endorsed by the Association in April 1922.
