= Bant (disambiguation) =

Bant is a town in Flevoland, the Netherlands.

Bant may also refer to:

- Bant, the diminutive of banter
- Bunt (community), an ethnic group of Karnataka, India
- Bant (Omdurman), a neighbourhood in Omdurman, Sudan
- Bant, one of the planes from the Shards of Alara block in Magic: The Gathering
- Lake Bant, Wilhelmshaven, Germany
  - Lake Bant tern colony, a breeding colony of common terns (Sterna hirundo) at Lake Bant
- BANT, Lead Qualification Methodology

== People with the name ==
- Chris Bant (1881–1949), Australian footballer
- Horrie Bant (1882–1957), Australian footballer
- Stephen Bant, MP for Liskeard, England
- Bant Singh, Indian activist
- Bant Singer, pen-name of Charles Shaw, Australian journalist and writer
