= 1888 VFA season =

12th season of the Australian rules football competition

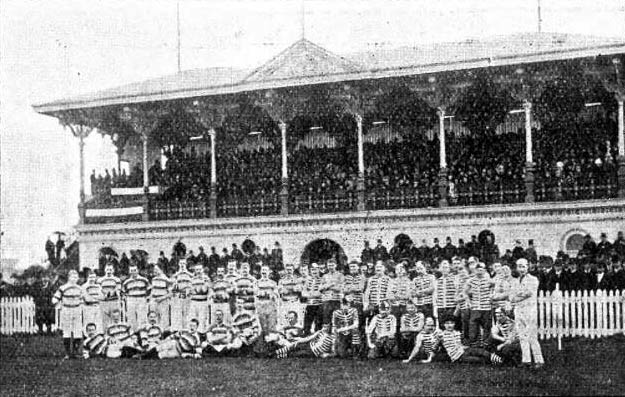
- South Melbourne – 1888 VFA premiers

Overview
- Date: 5 May – 29 September 1888
- Teams: 16
- Premiers: South Melbourne; 3rd premiership
- Leading goalkicker: Dinny McKay (South Melbourne – 50 goals)

The 1888 VFA season was the twelfth season of the Victorian Football Association (VFA), the highest-level senior Australian rules football competition in Victoria. The season began on 5 May and concluded on 29 September.

South Melbourne won the premiership after finishing the season with 15 wins from its 19 matches. It was the third VFA premiership in the club's history, and the first out of a sequence of three consecutive premierships won from 1888 to 1890.

== Association membership ==
Prior to 1888, Williamstown and South Williamstown amalgamated, with the merged entity considered a continuation of Williamstown. South Williamstown club had been established in 1886 as the result of a dispute between the Williamstown Football Club and Williamstown Cricket Club over the use of the Williamstown Cricket Ground for football; this schism persisted for two seasons, with unsatisfactory outcomes, including poor onfield performances resulting from the fact that Williamstown, which was then a small fishing village, could not supply enough talented players to sustain two competitive senior teams. The football and cricket clubs came to agreeable terms over the 1887-88 summer, and formed a single entity which fielded one senior cricket team and one senior football team, both of which played at the cricket ground. The amalgamated club went on to finish third for the season.

Additionally, the neighbouring clubs of Prahran and St Kilda, which had both begun competing as senior clubs in 1886, amalgamated into one club; the merged entity retained the name and history of St Kilda, and adopted St Kilda's red, white and black guernsey with Prahran's blue trousers as its uniform.

As a result of these two amalgamations, the size of the Association contracted from eighteen senior teams to sixteen in 1889.

The borough of Hotham was renamed North Melbourne, and the Hotham Football Club was accordingly renamed the North Melbourne Football Club.

== Premiership season ==
=== Round 1 ===
	Round 1
Saturday, 5 May	St Kilda 4.10	def. by	Carlton 7.18	Junction Oval
Saturday, 5 May	Fitzroy 3.6	def.	Richmond 1.2	Brunswick Street Oval
Saturday, 5 May	Essendon 3.9	def.	University 2.4	East Melbourne Cricket Ground
Saturday, 5 May	Williamstown 2.4	def.	Footscray 1.4	Williamstown Cricket Ground
Saturday, 5 May	North Melbourne 3.3	drew with	South Ballarat 3.3	Arden Street Oval
Saturday, 5 May	Melbourne 3.4	def. by	Port Melbourne 6.9	Melbourne Cricket Ground
Saturday, 5 May	Ballarat 5.11	def.	Ballarat Imperial 2.4	Ballarat City Oval
	Bye; Geelong, South Melbourne

=== Round 2 ===
	Round 2
Saturday, 12 May	University 3.1	def. by	Carlton 13.4	University Oval
Saturday, 12 May	Richmond 9.14	def.	Footscray 0.5	Punt Road Oval
Saturday, 12 May	Essendon 3.1	def.	Port Melbourne 2.7	East Melbourne Cricket Ground
Saturday, 12 May	Fitzroy 5.14	def.	Williamstown 1.4	Brunswick Street Oval
Saturday, 12 May	Melbourne 6.12	def.	North Melbourne 3.3	Melbourne Cricket Ground
Saturday, 12 May	St Kilda 3.4	def. by	Geelong 4.11	Junction Oval
Saturday, 12 May	Ballarat Imperial 4.10	def. by	South Melbourne 6.9	Ballarat City Oval
	Bye; Ballarat, South Ballarat

== Ladder ==
For the first time, the senior clubs were formally ranked into a full premiership ladder of the type understood in the modern era. The teams were ranked under a new system designed by Theo Marshall:

- For all senior matches played against other Association clubs, four premiership points were awarded for a win and two for a draw.
- Teams did not play a uniform number of premiership matches during the season. Each team's premiership points were adjusted upwards proportionally to match that of the club which played the most matches during the season – e.g., in this season, South Melbourne played 19 matches and Port Melbourne played 22 matches, the most of any club; so, South Melbourne's tally of premiership points was increased by a factor of 22/19.
- After this adjustment, teams were ranked in order of adjusted points, and the top team was awarded the premiership.
- Teams were required to play at least eighteen senior games to qualify for the premiership.

This system meant that for the first time, the premiership was an official title conferred and endorsed by the Association, replacing the previous approach whereby the premier club was determined by an unofficial consensus but was conventionally understood to be won by the club which suffered the fewest defeats for the season – a system which was flawed because it treated wins and draws as equal in value. The Association also instituted the awarding of a premiership cap – in the Association's navy blue and gold colours – to players of the premiership team.

The full ladder is shown below. Of the sixteen clubs, Footscray, University and the three Ballarat-based clubs failed to play the minimum eighteen matches required to qualify for the premiership; they are still shown ranked by adjusted points, but are not given a finishing position.

Pos	Team	Pld	W	L	D	GF	GA	Pts	Adj Pts
1	South Melbourne (P)	19	15	2	2	138	45	64	74.10
2	Geelong	19	12	3	4	97	73	56	64.84
3	Williamstown	22	13	8	1	77	57	54	59.40
4	Carlton	19	11	5	3	103	74	50	57.89
–	Ballarat	16	9	5	2	61	45	40	55.00
–	South Ballarat	13	6	4	3	47	38	30	50.76
5	Richmond	21	11	8	2	86	76	48	50.28
6	Port Melbourne	22	12	9	1	97	80	50	50.00
7	North Melbourne	20	8	7	5	80	80	42	46.20
8	St Kilda	21	8	10	3	87	78	38	39.80
9	Essendon	19	7	11	1	60	80	30	34.73
10	Fitzroy	18	6	10	2	64	71	28	29.33
–	Footscray	15	5	10	0	33	70	20	29.33
11	Melbourne	19	4	14	1	52	117	18	20.84
–	Ballarat Imperial	14	2	11	1	38	75	10	15.71
–	University	15	0	14	1	16	77	2	2.93

(P) Premiers

== Notable events ==
- The struggling University club failed to contest its last three scheduled matches, and dropped out of the VFA and folded at the end of the season.
