= Ballarat Imperial Football Club =

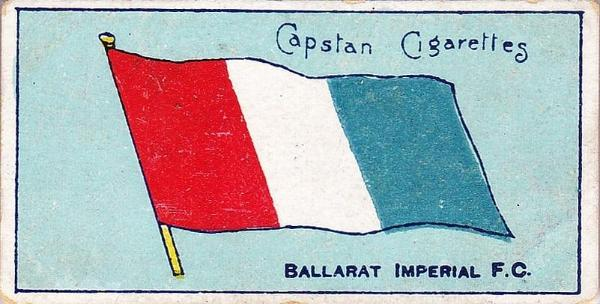

Names
- Full name: Ballarat Imperial Football Club
- Former name: Galatea Football Club (1876–78)
- Nickname: Blues / Imps / Tricolours

Club details
- Founded: 1876
- Dissolved: 1955; 70 years ago
- Colours
- Competition: Ballarat Football League
- Premierships: 20 (1884, 1890, 1891, 1892, 1893, 1894, 1895, 1896, 1899, 1900, 1901, 1902, 1903, 1905, 1906, 1922, 1929, 1935, 1936, 1937)

Uniforms
Home

The Ballarat Imperial Football Club was an Australian rules football club that competed in the Ballarat Football League (BFL). The club was one of the most successful teams in the league, winning 17 premierships before it was dissolved in 1955.

== History ==
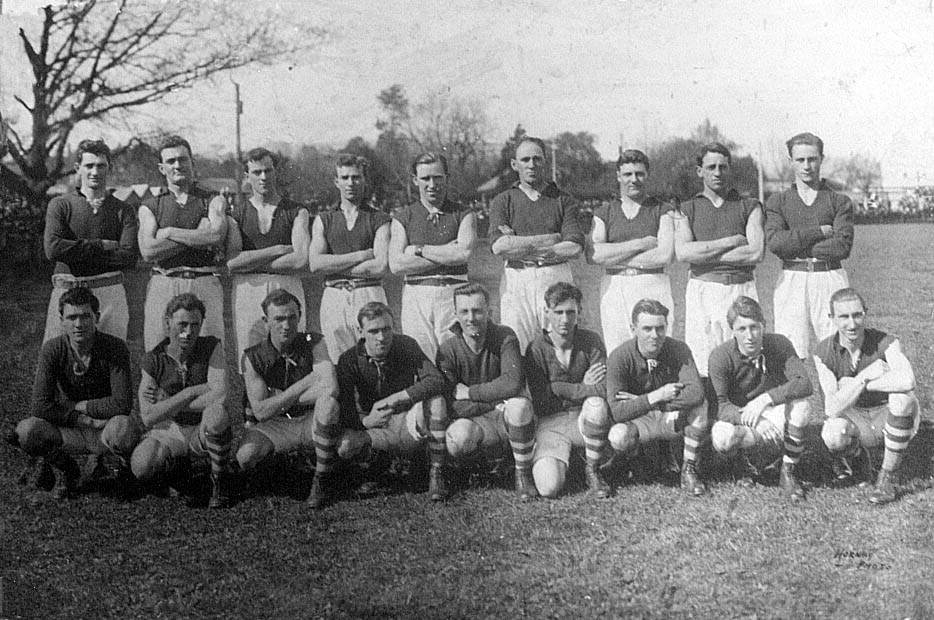
1921 - BFL Runner Up: Ballarat Imperial FC defeated by Golden Point FC

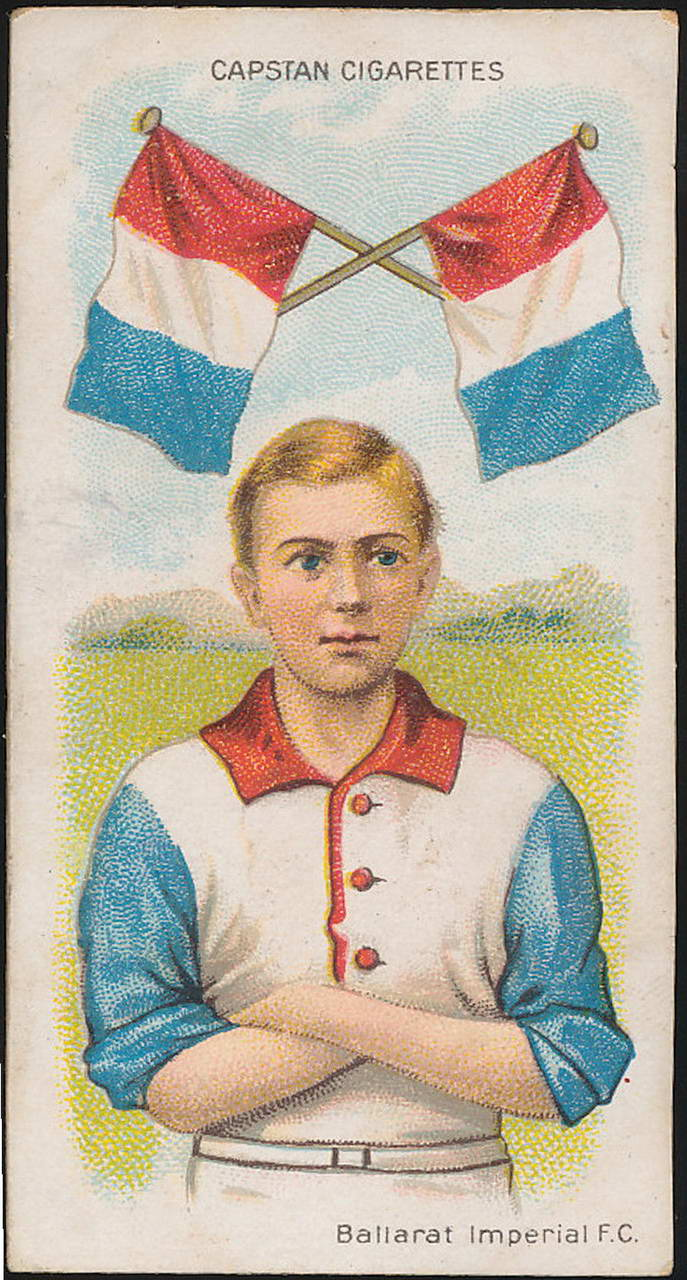
Club colours in 1913

The club was formed in the mid-1870s as the "Galatea Football Club" before becoming known as "Ballarat Imperial" in 1878 with the first practice match taking place on Saturday 4th May 1878.

In 1882, Ballarat Imperial FC and City FC agreed to merge clubs and become known as the Ballarat City Imperial FC and retain the colours of Ballarat Imperial FC.

During an 1883 match against Albion Imperial, Ballarat Imperial captain John Williams Mills was struck in the abdomen, but played out the remainder of the match. However, he died the following morning.

In 1885, a second twenty (reserves) team was formed.

The club was a provincial playing member of the Victorian Football Association (VFA) from 1885 until 1888, taking part in the Association's administration and competing regularly against Melbourne-based VFA clubs.

The club's VFA positions were as follows - 1885 - 10th, 1886 - 15th, 1887 - 13th, 1888 - 14th.

The club played against the touring British footballers in 1888.

George McKenzie was captain of Ballarat Imperials when they won six consecutive premierships between 1891 and 1896 and were runners up in 1897 and 1898.

Ballarat Imperial was a founding member of the Ballarat Football Association in 1893, and was its dominant club through its early years, winning eleven of the first fourteen premierships. The club returned to prominence in the 1930s, winning three premierships in a row from 1935 to 1937. In 1937, it made an attempt to rejoin the VFA as a full member. However, it was felt that a second Ballarat-based team would have to be included to ensure that one VFA game could be played in Ballarat each weekend, and no willing co-applicant could be found.

In 1905, Ballarat Imperials player, F James won the Ballarat Football League's most popular player award, the Hutton Cup, receiving 40,514 votes via returned Hutton coupons.

In 1938, the Ballarat Football League and Ballarat Football Association merged and Ballarat Imperials then merged with the East Ballarat Football Club and played as Ballarat Imperials, finishing runner up to Sebastopol.

The club went into recess just prior to the start of the 1939 Ballarat Football League season, although it played in the Ballarat Football League B. Grade competition from 1948 to 1952 after World War Two, it never returned to the Ballarat Football League senior football competition and folded.

Football Timeline

- 1875 - Galatea Football Club formed
- 1878 - 1882: Club known as Ballarat Imperial FC & played against other local teams.
- 1883 - 1892: Played in the unofficial Ballarat Football Association.
- 1885 - 1888: Victorian Football Association
- 1893 - 1914: Ballarat Football League
- 1915 - 1918: In recess due to World War One
- 1919 - 1938: Ballarat Football League
- 1939 - 1945: In recess due to World War Two
- 1948 - 1952: Ballarat Football League - B. Grade

== Premierships ==
Seniors

- Ballarat / Western Districts (4)
  - 1884 - Ballarat Imperials:
  - 1890 - Ballarat Imperial & Ballarat tied
  - 1891 - Ballarat Imperial: 1st, Ballarat: 2nd
  - 1892 - Ballarat Imperial: 1st, Ballarat: 2nd
- Ballarat Football League (13)
  - 1893 - Ballarat Imperial: 1st, Sebastopol: 2nd
  - 1894 - Ballarat Imperial: 1st, Ballarat: 2nd
  - 1895 - Ballarat Imperial: 1st, South Ballarat: 2nd
  - 1896 - Ballarat Imperial: 1st, Ballarat: 2nd
  - 1899 - Ballarat Imperial: 1st, Ballarat: 2nd
  - 1900 - Ballarat Imperial: 1st, Ballarat: 2nd
  - 1901 - Ballarat Imperial: 1st, Ballarat: 2nd
  - 1902 - Ballarat Imperial: 1st, Ballarat: 2nd
  - 1903 - Ballarat Imperial: 1st, Ballarat: 2nd
  - 1905 - Ballarat Imperial: 5.12 - 42 d South Ballarat: 3.6 - 24
  - 1906 - Ballarat Imperial: 4.17 - 41 d Ballarat: 0.4 - 4
  - 1922 - Ballarat Imperial: 5.3 - 33 d Golden Point: 3.7 - 25
  - 1929 - Ballarat Imperial: 9.12 - 66 d Ballarat: 8.10 - 58
- Ballarat Wimmera Football League (2)
  - 1935 - Ballarat Imperial: 14.8 - 92 d Golden Point: 9.19 - 73
  - 1936 - Ballarat Imperial: 15.9 - 99 d Ballarat: 6.4 - 40
- Ballarat Football League (1)
  - 1937 - Ballarat Imperial: 13.9 - 87 d Golden Point: 4.5 - 29 (undefeated premiers)

== Runners Up ==
Seniors

- Ballarat Football League (14)
  - 1885, 1886, 1887, 1889, 1897, 1898, 1907, 1909, 1910, 1914, 1919, 1920, 1921, 1938

== VFL Players ==
The following footballers played with Ballarat Imperial FC prior to playing senior VFL football, with the year indicating their VFL debut.

- 1897: Peter Burns - Geelong
- 1897: Harry Wright - Essendon
- 1898: Bill Jackson - Essendon
- 1901: Leo S. Morgan - Collingwood
- 1902: Tom Fox - Carlton
- 1904: Harry Gibson - South Melbourne
- 1905: Glyn Thomas - St Kilda
- 1906: Horrie Bant - St Kilda
- 1906: Harold Stanley - Melbourne
- 1906: Edgar Stubbs - Geelong
- 1907: Chris Bant - St Kilda
- 1911: Jack Gray - Geelong
- 1913: Bill Eastick - South Melbourne
- 1925: George Waterhouse - South Melbourne
- 1932: Joe Hogan - Melbourne
- 1934: Frank Finn - Carlton
- 1936: Lou Reiffel - Melbourne
- 1938: Dick Hingston - Melbourne

The following footballers played senior VFL football prior to playing and / or coaching with Ballarat Imperial FC with the year indicating their first season at the BIFC.

- 1911: Ray Ritchie - Carlton
- 1924: Wally Johnson - Fitzroy
- 1926: Stan McKenzie - Hawthorn
- 1929: Charlie Clymo - Melbourne
- 1931: Max Pitchford - North Melbourne
- 1932: Alec Eason - Geelong
- 1935: Jack Wunhym - Footscray

== Links ==
- / 1891 - Premiers: Ballarat Imperial FC team photo
- / 1901 - Ballarat FL Premiers: Ballarat Imperial FC team photo
- 1921 - Ballarat FL Runner Up: Ballarat Imperial FC team photo
- 1929 - Ballarat FL Premiers: Ballarat Imperial FC team photo
- 1930 - Ballarat FC & Ballarat Imperial FC team photos
- 1922 - Hereditary Footballers via The Herald newspaper
- 1931 - Clymo well thought of in Ballarat via The Sporting Globe newspaper
- 1941 - Ballarat Veteran's all round record in sport via The Weekly Times newspaper
- 1942 - Bill Roff's colourful career in Ballarat sport via The Weekly Times newspaper
- 1942 - Ballarat's man's 35 years of fire fighting via The Weekly times newspaper
- 1946 - Career of Late Mr. Herb Giddings via The Horsham Times newspaper
- 1952 - Peter Burns dies via The Record newspaper
