= Fearon Reserve =

Sports venue in Williamstown, Melbourne, Victoria

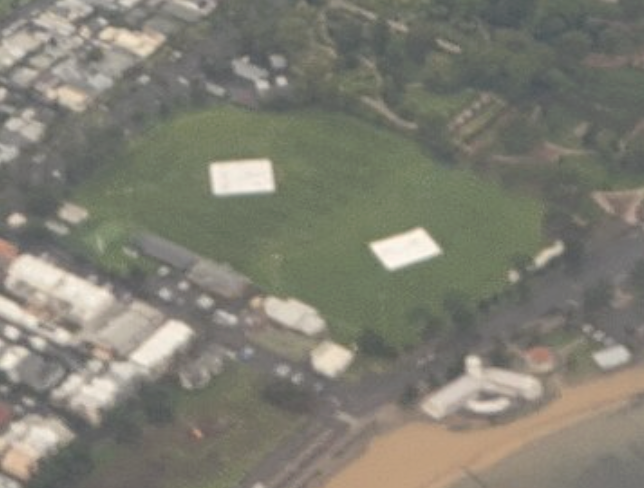
- Interactive map of Fearon Reserve
- Former names: Garden's Reserve (1870s–1936)
- Address: Garden St & Osborne St; Williamstown, Victoria
- Coordinates: 37.86702479495746°S 144.89487012511748°E
- Owner: City of Hobsons Bay
- Capacity: 1,000
- Record attendance: 5,000 (Williamstown vs South Melbourne, 25 September 1886)
- Public transit: ● Williamstown Beach; Fearon Res/Osborne St

Construction
- Opened: 1870s; 155 years ago

Tenants
- Williamstown CYMS Football Club (VAFA); Williamstown Imperial Cricket Club (NWMCA); Williamstown Lacrosse Club

Fearon Reserve (formerly known as Garden's Reserve) is an Australian rules football and cricket venue in the Melbourne suburb of Williamstown. The name also refers to the wider public park in which the main oval and lacrosse field are located.

As of 2025, it is home to the Williamstown CYMS Football Club in the Victorian Amateur Football Association (VAFA), the Williamstown Imperial Cricket Club in the North West Metropolitan Cricket Association (NWMCA), and the Williamstown Lacrosse Club.

== History ==
Garden's Reserve (sometimes stylised Gardens Reserve) was established in the 1870s. The Williamstown Football Club (WFC), which was established in 1864 and initially competed in junior (Note: At the time, the term "junior" was used to describe open age football of a lower standard than senior football, rather than under age football.) competitions, was granted permission by Williamstown Council to play its home matches on the ground in 1872.

In 1884, Williamstown was elevated from junior status and entered the Victorian Football Association (VFA) as a senior side. The club sought to play its home matches at the Williamstown Cricket Ground (WCG), located approximately 1.3 kilometres (0.81 mi) away, but were not granted permission owing to a dispute with the Williamstown Cricket Club, and WFC was forced to continue playing at Garden's Reserve. Because the ground was unfenced, WFC was unable to charge for admission to its home matches.

Players wishing to play on the cricket ground ultimately established a rival senior club, the South Williamstown Football Club, which contested the VFA in 1886 and 1887. The dispute was settled in 1888 and South Williamstown amalgamated with Williamstown; and, through an organisational affiliation with the cricket club, the WCG was established as the football club's permanent home ground. The final VFA match at Garden's Reserve was between Williamstown and St Kilda on 17 September 1887, in front of a crowd of 400 people.

The Williamstown CYMS Football Club played at Garden's Reserve as early as 1909, while the Williamstown Lacrosse Club moved there in 1910. At this time, the ground (nicknamed "The Gardens") was described by lacrosse players as a "cow paddock" because it did not have a proper playing field. When the ground was redeveloped in 1936, it was renamed to Fearon Reserve in honour of James Fearon (1863–1944), a harbour pilot who served as the president of the Williamstown Lacrosse Club between 1901 and 1943.

Until the late 1970s, the player changing room and the social clubrooms were located in the same area, forcing supporters to wait outside while the players showered. A wooden pavilion stood on the western side of the ground (shared by Williamstown CYMS and the Williamstown United Football Club) before it was replaced by a brick building.

== Transport access ==
Fearon Reserve is primarily serviced by bus route 471 operated by Transit Systems Victoria, which stops outside the ground. Williamstown line trains stop at Williamstown Beach station, which is located approximately 240 metres (790 ft) from the ground.
