= Stan McKenzie =

Stan McKenzie may refer to:

- Stan McKenzie (basketball) (1944–2021), an American retired basketball player.
- Stan McKenzie (footballer) (1896–1985), Australian rules footballer who played with Collingwood and Hawthorn
- Stanley McKenzie (1890–1915), Australian cricketer and footballer for Launceston and Carlton.
