= Dick Hingston =

Australian rules footballer

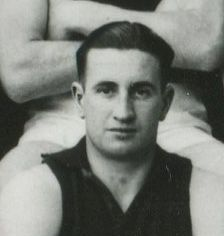

Personal information
- Full name: Richard David Hingston
- Born: 16 December 1915; Ballarat, Victoria
- Died: 3 December 1999 (aged 83); Newcastle, New South Wales
- Original teams: St Patrick's, Ballarat; Ballarat Imperials
- Height: 177 cm (5 ft 10 in)
- Weight: 84 kg (185 lb)
- Position: Half back

Playing career^{1}
Years	Club	Games (Goals)
1938–1941, 1946	Melbourne	64 (0)
- ^{1} Playing statistics correct to the end of 1946.

Richard David Hingston (16 December 1915 – 3 December 1999) was an Australian rules footballer who played for Melbourne in the Victorian Football League (VFL).

== Family ==
The son of Thomas James Hingston (1881–1948), and Margaret Jane Hingston (1883–1959), née Larkins, Richard David Hingston was born at Ballarat on 16 December 1915.

== Football ==
=== Ballarat Imperials (BFL) ===
Although invited two years earlier by the Melbourne Football Club (when playing for the "Junior" team, C.Y.M.S., coached by ex-Melbourne footballer, Jack Collins) to play football in Melbourne, he had been unable to find suitable employment.

Remaining in Ballarat, he played "Senior" football with the Ballarat Imperial Football Club in the Ballarat Football League (BFL), and was coached by ex-Footscray footballer Jack Wunhym.

=== Melbourne (VFL) ===
Having displayed impressive form in the club's 1938 pre-season training, and having been granted a clearance from Ballarat Imperials to Melbourne on 22 April 1938, Hingston played his first senior match for Melbourne, against Fitzroy Football Club, at the Brunswick Street Oval, on 7 May 1938 (round 3).

Hingston was a half-back flanker in Melbourne's 1939 and 1940 premiership teams.

He missed out on a third successive premiership in 1941 when, despite appearing in their semi final win over Carlton, Hingston was not selected for the Grand Final which Melbourne went on to win.

The defender did not make any appearances for the next four years due to his military service, but returned in 1946 for one final season.

=== Wycheproof (NCFL) ===
In 1947 he was cleared from Melbourne to the Wycheproof Football Club in the North Central Football League (NFL).
