= Bill Eastick =

Australian rules footballer

Personal information
- Full name: William Thomas Eastick
- Born: 13 March 1888; Nhill, Victoria
- Died: 22 October 1914 (aged 26); Nhill, Victoria
- Original team: Ballarat Imperials
- Height: 183 cm (6 ft 0 in)
- Weight: 79 kg (174 lb)

Playing career^{1}
Years	Club	Games (Goals)
1913–14	South Melbourne	15 (2)
- ^{1} Playing statistics correct to the end of 1914.

Bill Eastick (13 March 1888 – 22 October 1914) was an Australian rules footballer who played with South Melbourne. Eastick became ill early in the 1914 season and his health deteriorated throughout the year before his death in October.

== Sources ==
- Holmesby, Russell & Main, Jim (2007). The Encyclopedia of AFL Footballers. 7th ed. Melbourne: Bas Publishing.
- "The Record". Record (Emerald Hill, Vic.). 24 October 1914. p. 2.
