= Wasserturm Wilhelmshaven =

Coordinates: 53°31′36″N 8°7′14″E

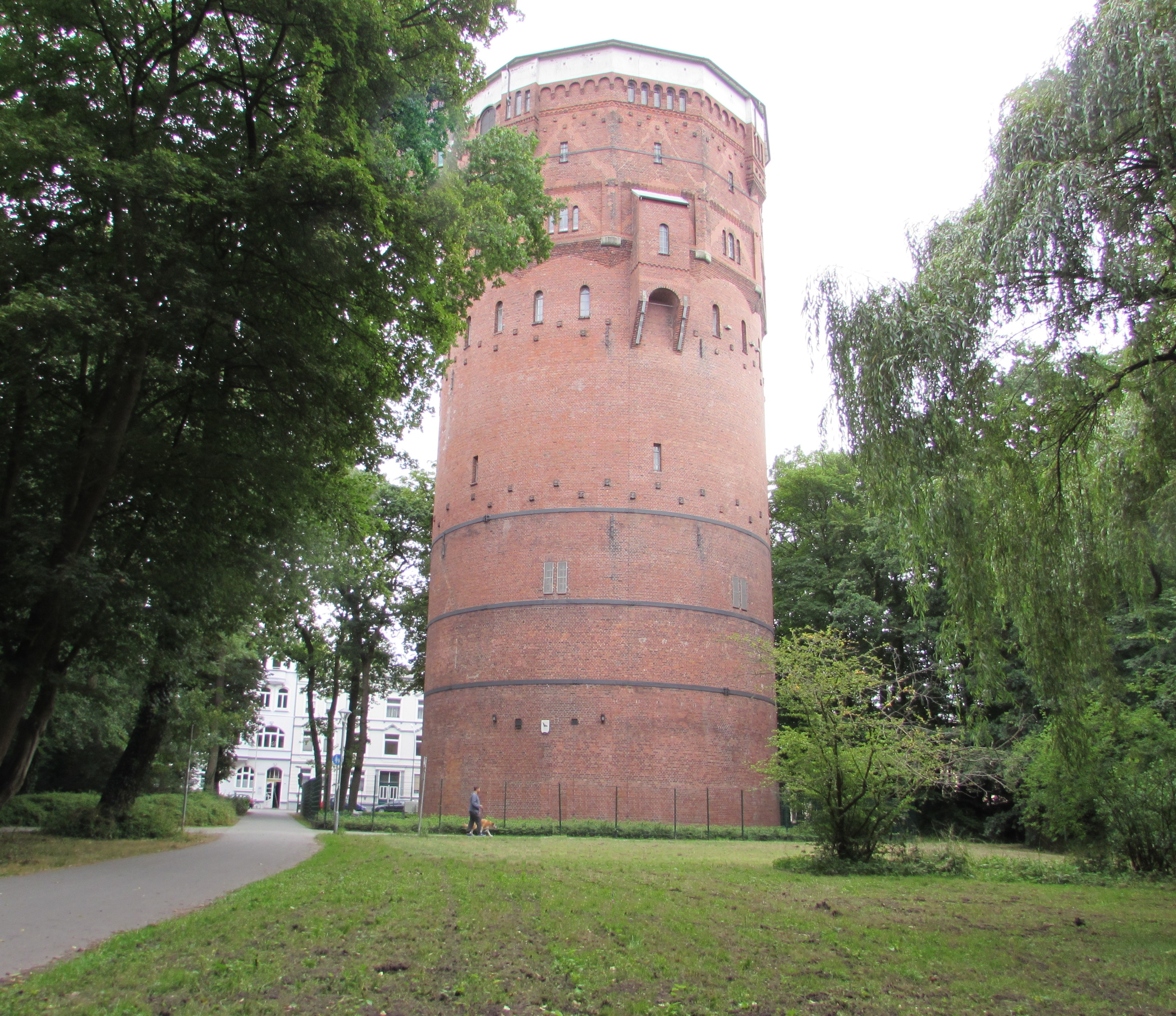
Wasserturm Wilhelmshaven

Wasserturm Wilhelmshaven (Wilhelmshaven Water Tower) is a 42-metre-tall (138 ft) landmark of Wilhelmshaven in Lower Saxony, Germany. The tower was built in the years of 1910–11 as the third water tower of Wilhelmshaven, and still functions as an important part of the town's water supply. It was originally constructed with a suspended drinking water storage element consisting of two alloyed steel chambers. Both chambers could contain between 800 and 1,200 cubic metres (210,000 and 320,000 US gal) of water.

The water container was revamped in 2007 during a working period of several months, and the whole tower including the foundation was reconstructed. After 100 years of operation the technique of the tower was outdated. Corrosion damages resulted in leaks of the inner connections. The old container was completely demounted during the reconstruction, and a new one made of stainless steel with a diameter of 15.90 metres (52.2 ft) and a water level of 8.75 metres (28.7 ft) was installed. The new container has a water capability of 1,750 cubic metres (460,000 US gal).

== Location ==
The tower is located in Kurpark at Bismarckstraße.
