= 1887 VFA season =

11th season of the Victorian Football Association

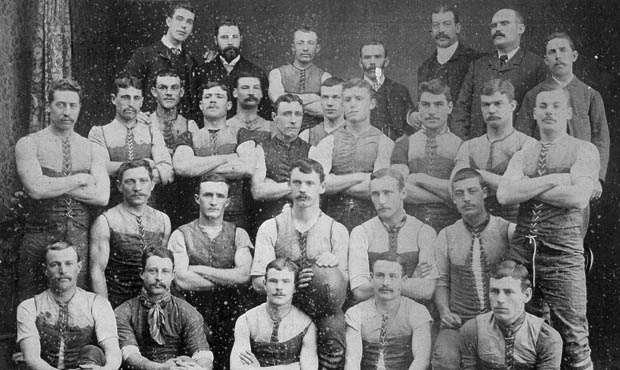
- Carlton – 1877 VFA premiers

Overview
- Date: 30 April – 1 October 1887
- Teams: 18
- Premiers: Carlton; 2nd premiership
- Leading goalkicker: Tom McShane (Geelong – 24 goals)

The 1887 VFA season was the eleventh season of the Victorian Football Association (VFA), the highest-level senior Australian rules football competition in Victoria.

Carlton won the premiership for the second time, after finishing the season with 15 wins from its 18 matches. It was the club's last VFA premiership.

== Association membership ==
The metropolitan membership of the Association (including Geelong) remained unchanged from the fifteen clubs which contested the premiership in 1886. The three Ballarat-based clubs (Ballarat, Ballarat Imperial and South Ballarat) also remained senior clubs; however, unlike in previous years, they were included in the premiership lists by all of the major sportswriters.

== 1887 VFA premiership ==
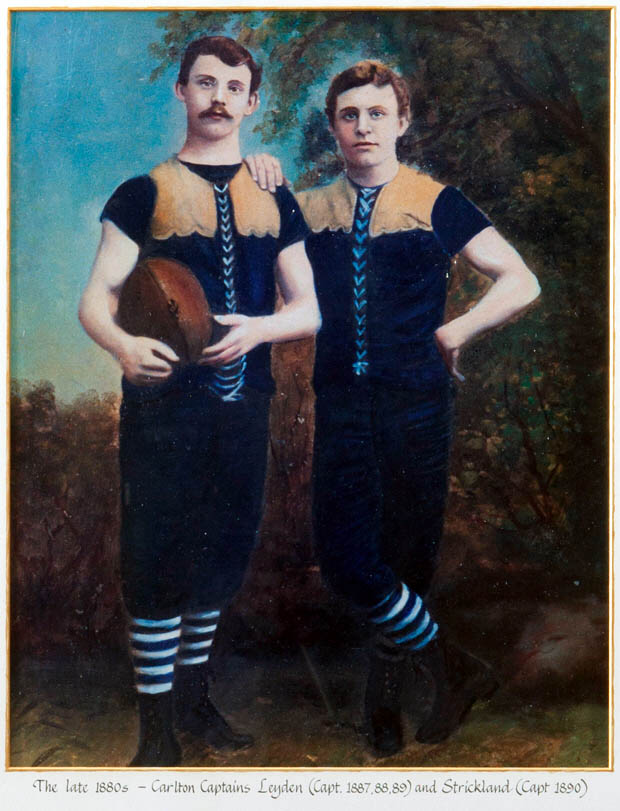
Tom Leydin and Bill Strickland, captain and vice-captain of Carlton FC

The premiership was won by the Carlton Football Club, which played eighteen matches for the season for fifteen wins, two draws and a loss. The runner-up was Geelong, which played twenty-one matches for sixteen wins, three draws and two losses. South Melbourne was ranked third. No official system for deciding the premiership existed, but it was conventional for the club which suffered the fewest defeats during the season to be named premier.

=== Ballarat Imperial vs Geelong match ===
On Saturday 2 July, a weakened Geelong, which was missing eight of its best twenty due to unavailability, suffered one of its two losses for the season when Ballarat Imperial beat them 3.4 to 0.2 at the Eastern Oval in Ballarat. As the season progressed, questions were raised by the Geelong club and many spectators over whether or not this match should be counted towards the premiership. Reasons why Geelong supporters believed it should have been excluded were:

- The match had been arranged informally as part of a country trip after a planned tour of Adelaide was cancelled, and was not included in the Association fixture at the beginning of the season.
- That the club had not expected the match to be counted when it was played.
- There were procedural irregularities related to the appointment of the umpires.

Since the premiership was still an unofficial title conferred largely by press consensus, there was nothing within laws of the Association to deal specifically with the matter of the premiership; and, therefore there was no formal avenue through which to protest its inclusion. The Sportsman newspaper published a lengthy opinion on the matter in late July, favouring the inclusion of the match in the premiership. It referred in particular to Association Rule 3 which stated:

3. The Football Season shall commence on the first Saturday in May, and terminate on the 30th September.
(a) Week-day matches – except 24th May [Queen's Birthday] – shall not be recognised by the Association.

and concluded that since the match wasn't specifically excluded by Rule 3a that it should be included. The Sportsman also noted that while Rule 18 related to the appointment of the umpires was contravened, that this should have been resolved by penalising the clubs, not by invalidating the match.

The matter was discussed at the Association's general meeting on 12 August. Although there was no formal protest and the Association had no rules governing the premiership, delegates noted that "it was desirable, for the sake of the public, to answer the question of whether or not the match counted." Following discussion, a motion was carried that the match should be counted.

Had Geelong been successful in having the match excluded from the premiership, ceteris paribus, it and Carlton would each have finished with only one defeat for the season, and a playoff match would likely have been arranged to decide the premiership. The 1887 season was the last premiership decided in this informal manner, and a formal Association-endorsed method for determining the premiership was introduced from 1888.

== Senior club records ==
The below table details the records of the eighteen clubs in senior matches during the 1887 season. Saturday matches and matches played on Queen's Birthday were counted towards the premiership, but matches played on the celebration the Golden Jubilee were not counted.

The clubs are listed in the order in which they were ranked in the Sportsman newspaper. The VFA had no formal process by which the clubs were ranked, so the below order should be considered indicative only, particularly since the fixturing of matches was not standardised; however, the top three placings were later acknowledged in publications including the Football Record and are considered official.

Pos	Team	Pld	W	L	D	GF	GA
1	Carlton (P)	18	15	1	2	94	43
2	Geelong	21	16	2	3	110	57
3	South Melbourne	20	12	4	4	103	53
	Fitzroy	20	11	4	5	71	56
	Port Melbourne	20	12	6	2	97	50
	Williamstown	19	9	8	2	64	73
	Richmond	19	8	8	3	63	70
	Hotham	18	6	8	4	73	79
	Essendon	16	5	9	2	49	67
	Melbourne	18	6	10	2	64	80
	Prahran	18	5	11	2	42	75
	University	17	4	13	0	45	94
	Ballarat Imperial	13	6	4	3	52	44
	Ballarat	13	5	6	2	49	43
	St Kilda	18	4	13	1	48	95
	South Williamstown	18	3	13	2	35	78
	South Ballarat	10	3	2	5	50	40
	Footscray	14	2	10	2	25	47

(P) Premiers

== Notable events ==
- Melbourne president Frank Grey Smith replaced James Garton as president of the Association. Garton had presided since 1882.
- Prior to the season, the distance between each goalpost and its adjacent kick-off post (behind post) was reduced from twenty yards to ten yards, greatly reducing the area through which a team would be credited a behind.

== See also ==
- 1887 Victorian football season
