= Ray Ritchie (Australian rules footballer) =

Australian rules footballer (1889–1950)

Personal information
- Full name: Raymond Sayer Ritchie
- Born: 12 January 1889; Rutherglen, Victoria
- Died: 15 April 1950 (aged 61); Newport, Victoria
- Original team: Korumburra

Playing career
| Years | Club | Games (Goals) |
| 1909 | Carlton | 1 (0) |

Raymond Sayer Ritchie (12 January 1889 – 15 April 1950) was an Australian rules footballer who played with Carlton in the Victorian Football League (VFL), noted for being the first player to be scrutinised and suspended by the league's permit committee for breaching player registration rules.

== Early life ==
The son of William Alexander Ritchie (1864–1938), and Anne Ritchie (1863–1945), née Price, Raymond Sayer Ritchie was born at Rutherglen, Victoria, on 12 January 1889.

== Football career ==
=== VFL career (1909) ===
A compositor by trade, Ritchie originally played for Korumburra before entering the VFL. Ahead of the 1909 VFL season, he organised to play with Richmond, on the condition his travel expenses (30 shillings) were paid on the night of any matches he played, for he could not afford to lose this money. Although Richmond agreed to Ritchie's terms, he instead opted to join Carlton, who offered him £2 per match in expenses. On discovering this arrangement, Richmond complained to Ritchie about this broken promise. Ritchie responded with regret and suggested, as minor compensation, he would attempt to avoid selection in any Carlton team against Richmond.

However, in April, Ritchie went ahead and registered to play with Carlton. Richmond challenged his registration, and the VFL permit committee held a hearing on the dispute on 30 April. At the hearing, Richmond produced letters from Ritchie to prove he had promised to play for the club. Their case was successful in part: although the permit committee, after conferring in private, decided to grant Ritchie's registration at Carlton, they indefinitely prohibited Carlton from selecting him for matches. According to the Argus, this amounted to an indefinite ban on Ritchie playing football altogether, for he would need a clearance from Carlton and the VFL if he wanted to play at another club. To the permit committee's amusement, Ritchie billed the league £1 13s 6d for his expenses in attending the hearing. The account was forwarded to the financial committee with a recommendation it not be paid.

Although Ritchie's ban was indefinite, by June, the Argus reported "in many quarters there is a feeling that he erred through ignorance", suggesting the league could imminently lift the prohibition. On 23 June, the permit committee decided to do so, freeing Ritchie for Carlton selection. He played his first VFL match on 28 August against St Kilda, a victory in the second-last round of the season. Carlton trialled Ritchie as a back pocket, among the replacements for several players who had been rested in preparation for the finals. Although the Argus thought Ritchie "shaped fairly well" on debut, their columnist expected Carlton to drop him for the following match against Essendon, considered too important for a player so inexperienced in the VFL.

=== Post-VFL career (1911–1921) ===
Ritchie ultimately played no further VFL matches. By June 1911, the league granted him a clearance to Ballarat Imperial in the Ballarat Football League (BFL). However, this would provoke another registration dispute: when the BFL committee was deciding whether to grant Ritchie's permit, Ballarat argued he had broken a previous promise to play for them. Ritchie's fate was decided in a 3–2 vote, with the committee chair intervening with his casting vote to grant the permit.

By 1912, Ritchie began playing for Woomelang, winning the club's award for best player, and captaining the club for 1913. He briefly served as an umpire in 1914, but resigned. After a "long spell from the Woomelang ranks", Ritchie returned to the club in 1918.

In May 1921, Ritchie successfully applied to be Stawell's player-coach on £3 per week, defeating five other competitors for the position. He resigned the following month, but was reinstated in July for the rest of the season.

== Personal life ==
Ritchie married Florence Kathleen Murphy in 1911. A dispute between the couple appeared in the Ballarat courts in 1912.

== Death ==
Ritchie died at Newport, Victoria, on 15 April 1950.
