= Max Pitchford =

Australian rules footballer, born 1903

Personal information
- Full name: Lewis McComb Pitchford
- Born: 11 June 1903; Mornington, Victoria
- Died: 25 July 1969 (aged 66); Hobart, Tasmania
- Original teams: St Patrick's FC, Albury. O&MFL
- Height: 188 cm (6 ft 2 in)
- Weight: 79 kg (174 lb)
- Position: Ruck / Forward

Playing career^{1}
Years	Club	Games (Goals)
1927–30	North Melbourne	51 (15)
- ^{1} Playing statistics correct to the end of 1930.

Lewis McComb Pitchford (11 June 1903 – 25 July 1969) was an Australian rules footballer who played with North Melbourne in the Victorian Football League (VFL).

== Football ==
Originally playing with Mornington, Pitchford trialled with Fitzroy in 1923 before playing with St Patricks in Albury in 1926.

Pitchford moved to North Melbourne in 1927 and played 51 games over the next four seasons for the club.

In 1931 he was appointed as captain-coach of Ballarat Imperials Football Club.

== War service ==
Pitchford later served in the Australian Army during World War II.

== Death ==
Pitchford died in Hobart on 25 July 1969 and is buried at Cornelian Bay Cemetery.
