= Edgar Stubbs =

Australian rules footballer

Personal information
- Full name: Ernest Edgar Stubbs
- Born: 28 March 1883; Ballarat East, Victoria
- Died: 13 September 1955 (aged 72); St George, Queensland
- Original teams: Beaufort, Ballarat Imperial

Playing career^{1}
Years	Club	Games (Goals)
1906	Geelong	5 (3)
- ^{1} Playing statistics correct to the end of 1906.

Ernest Edgar Stubbs (28 March 1883 – 13 September 1955) was an Australian rules footballer who played with Geelong in the Victorian Football League (VFL).

== Family ==
The son of Albert Charles Stubbs (1856-1922), and Maria Stubbs (1862-1939), née Hazelgrove, Ernest Edgar Stubbs was born in Ballarat East, Victoria on 28 March 1883.

He married Eva Ethel Maud McDonald on 29 June 1925.

== Football ==
On 4 July 1906, Stubbs was granted a clearance from Ballarat Imperial Football Club to play with Geelong, and he played his first match against Essendon on 7 July 1906. He played five games in all, with his last appearance in a team that was thrashed by South Melbourne, 14.17 (101) to 5.8 (38), on 4 August 1906.

In 1907 he was playing with the Golden Point Football Club in the Ballarat Football Association.

== Death ==
He died at St George, Queensland on 13 September 1955.
