= 1887 Victorian football season =

18th senior season of Australian rules football in Victoria

- Date: 30 April – 1 October 1887

The 1887 Victorian football season was the 18th senior season of Australian rules football in the colony of Victoria.

== Clubs ==
=== Founded ===
Club	League	Ref
Frankston		

=== Name changes ===
Former	New	League	Ref
Hawthorn Juniors	Riversdale	VJFA	

== VFA ==
Carlton won the Victorian Football Association (VFA) premiership for the second time, after finishing the season with 15 wins from its 18 matches. It was the club's last VFA premiership.

== VJFA ==
1887 VJFA season
- Premiers: North Park; 2nd premiership

The 1887 VJFA season was the fifth season of the Victorian Junior Football Association (VJFA). (Note: At the time, the term "junior" was used to describe open age football of a lower standard than senior football, rather than under age football.) North Park won the premiership for the second time, as part of a sequence of five premierships won by the club between 1886 and 1890.

The third-rate junior premiership was won by Capel United. Vaucluse also claimed the premiership and Victory was considered one of the best-performing clubs of the 1887 season.

=== Ladder ===
Pos	Team	Pld	W	L	D	GF	GA
1	North Park (P)	16	14	0	2	47	9
	Camberwell						
	Footscray Excelsior						
	Kew						
	Lilydale						
	Riversdale						
	South St Kilda						
	Union Jack						
	Werribee Juniors						

(P) Premiers

== Ballarat District ==
Ballarat was the premier club in the Ballarat District competition. The premiers in the second-rate junior competition was disputed, with Soldiers Hill Imperial and Wanderers both claiming the title.

=== Ladder ===
Pos	Team	Pld	W	L	D	GF	GA
1	Ballarat (P)	13	5	6	2	49	43
2	Ballarat Imperial	13	6	4	3	52	44
	South Ballarat	10	3	2	5	50	40

(P) Premiers

== Sandhurst ==
1887 SFA season
- Premiers: Eaglehawk; 4th premiership

The 1887 SFA season was the seventh season of the Sandhurst Football Association (SFA).

The official history of the Bendigo Football Netball League lists Eaglehawk as winning the premiership for the fourth time and for the second consecutive season. However, contemporary news reports state Bendigo was awarded the premiership following a meeting of SFA club representatives, which included a representative from Eaglehawk.

=== Ladder ===
Pos	Team	Pld	W	L	D	GF	GA
1	Eaglehawk (P)						
2	Bendigo						
3	Sandhurst						

(P) Premiers

== Upper Murray and Mitta District ==
Tallangatta was the premier club in the Upper Murray and Mitta District competition, after finishing the season with six wins from its seven matches.

=== Ladder ===
Pos	Team	Pld	W	L	D	GF	GA
1	Tallangatta (P)	7	6	1	0	17	8
2	Granya	2	0	2	0	0	4
3	Mitta Mitta	2	0	2	0	1	6
4	Granya Juniors	3	2	0	1		
	Bethanga						
	Bungil						

(P) Premiers
