= Joe Hogan (footballer, born 1909) =

Australian rules footballer (1909–1993)

Personal information
- Full name: Joseph Leo Hogan
- Born: 8 November 1909; Ballarat East, Victoria
- Died: 4 November 1993 (aged 83)
- Original team: Ballarat Imperials
- Height: 173 cm (5 ft 8 in)
- Weight: 69 kg (152 lb)

Playing career^{1}
Years	Club	Games (Goals)
1932	Melbourne	1 (0)
- ^{1} Playing statistics correct to the end of 1932.

Joseph Leo Hogan (8 November 1909 – 4 November 1993) was an Australian rules footballer who played with Melbourne in the Victorian Football League (VFL). He later played for Coburg in the Victorian Football Association.
