= Jack Gray (footballer, born 1885) =

Australian rules footballer

Personal information
- Full name: John Francis William Gray
- Born: 17 August 1885; Staffordshire Reef, Victoria
- Died: 23 May 1950 (aged 64); Geelong, Victoria
- Original team: Ballarat Imperials (BFL)
- Height: 175 cm (5 ft 9 in)
- Weight: 78 kg (172 lb)
- Position: Ruck / defence

Playing career^{1}
Years	Club	Games (Goals)
1911–15, 1917–19, 1921	Geelong	77 (8)
- ^{1} Playing statistics correct to the end of 1921.

John Francis William Gray (17 August 1885 – 23 May 1950) was an Australian rules footballer who played with Geelong in the Victorian Football League (VFL).
