= Harry Gibson (Australian footballer) =

Australian rules footballer

Personal information
- Full name: Harold Gibson
- Born: 27 December 1878; Ararat, Victoria
- Died: 12 August 1921 (aged 42); Ararat, Victoria
- Original team: Ballarat Imperials
- Position: Follower

Playing career^{1}
Years	Club	Games (Goals)
1904–1906	South Melbourne	41 (11)
- ^{1} Playing statistics correct to the end of 1906.

Harold Gibson (27 December 1878 – 12 August 1921) was an Australian rules footballer who played for the South Melbourne Football Club in the Victorian Football League (VFL). He died in a car accident at the age of 42.
