= Lake Bant tern colony =

Bird colony in Wilhelmshaven, Germany

Coordinates: 53.5110°N 8.1052°E

The Lake Bant tern colony is a breeding colony of common terns (Sterna hirundo) at Lake Bant (Banter See in German) in the port city of Wilhelmshaven, north-western Germany. It is the subject of a long-term research project carried out by the Institute of Avian Research (Heligoland Bird Observatory).

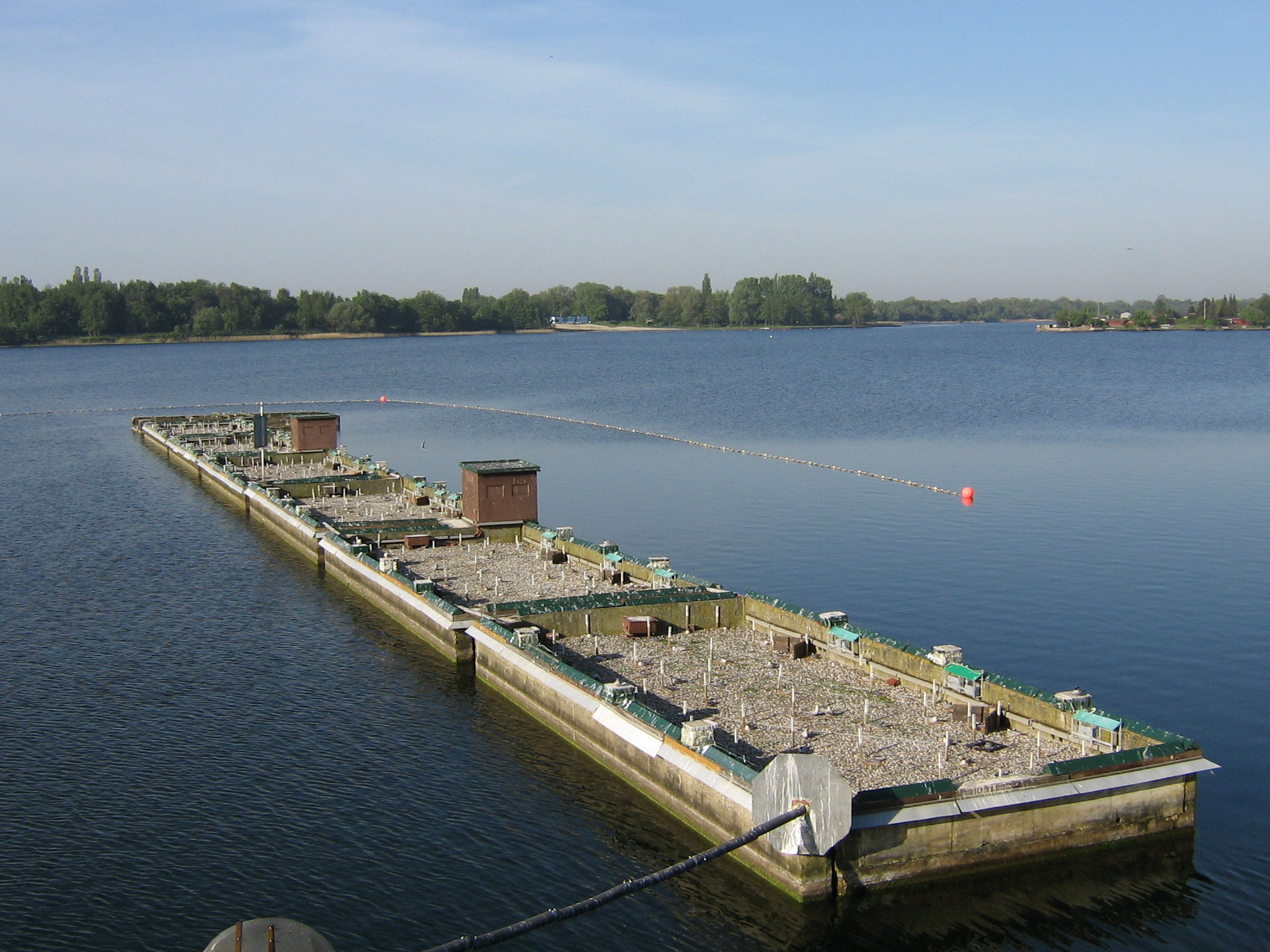
Common tern colony at Banter See in Wilhelmshaven, Germany

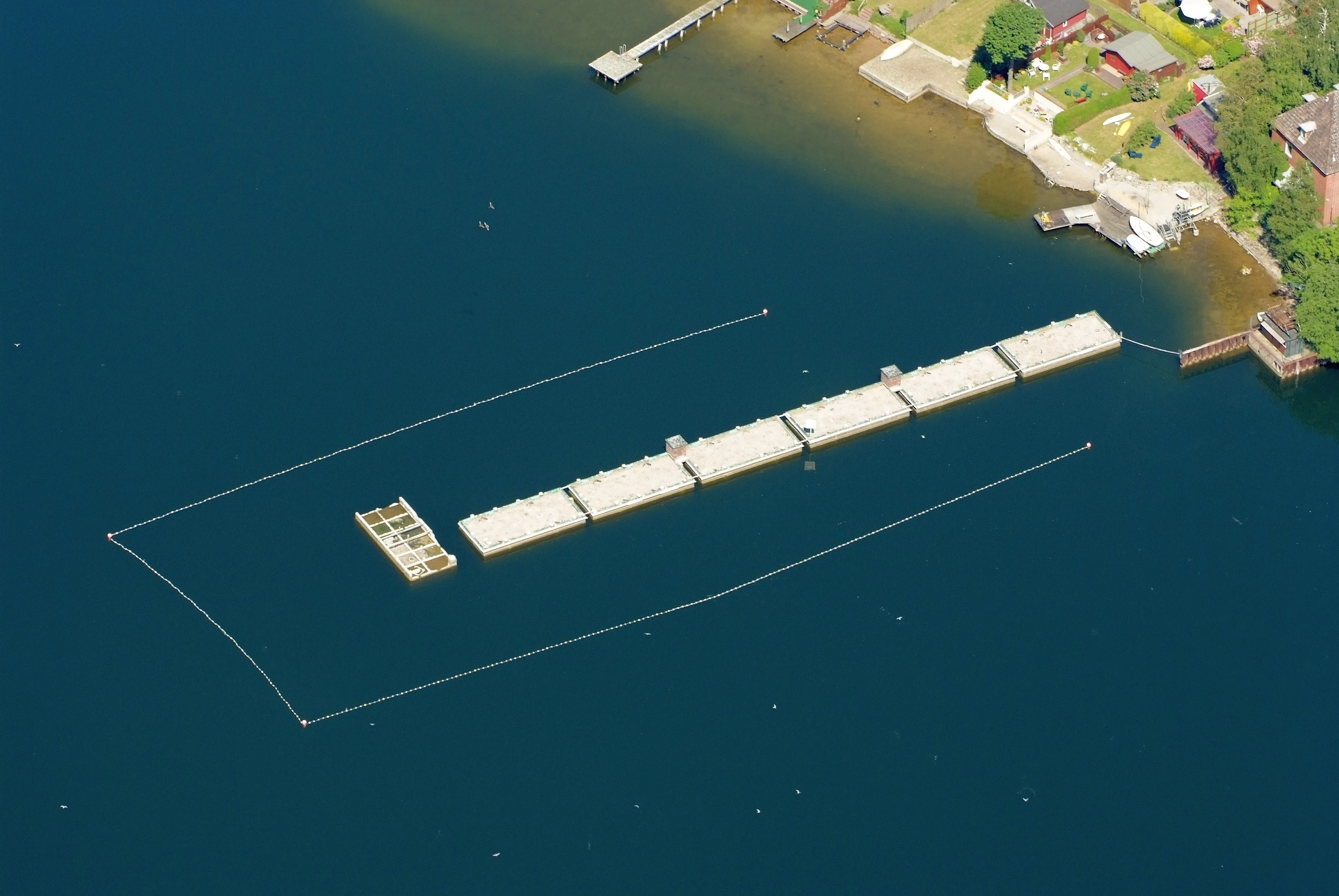
Aerial view of colony site

== Location ==
The colony breeds on six concrete islands, which were originally used as a loading dock for the now abandoned U-boat harbour at Banter See. The site is protected as a natural monument of the city. The colony was attracted to the site in 1984 using taped lures, after their previous breeding site had been destroyed.

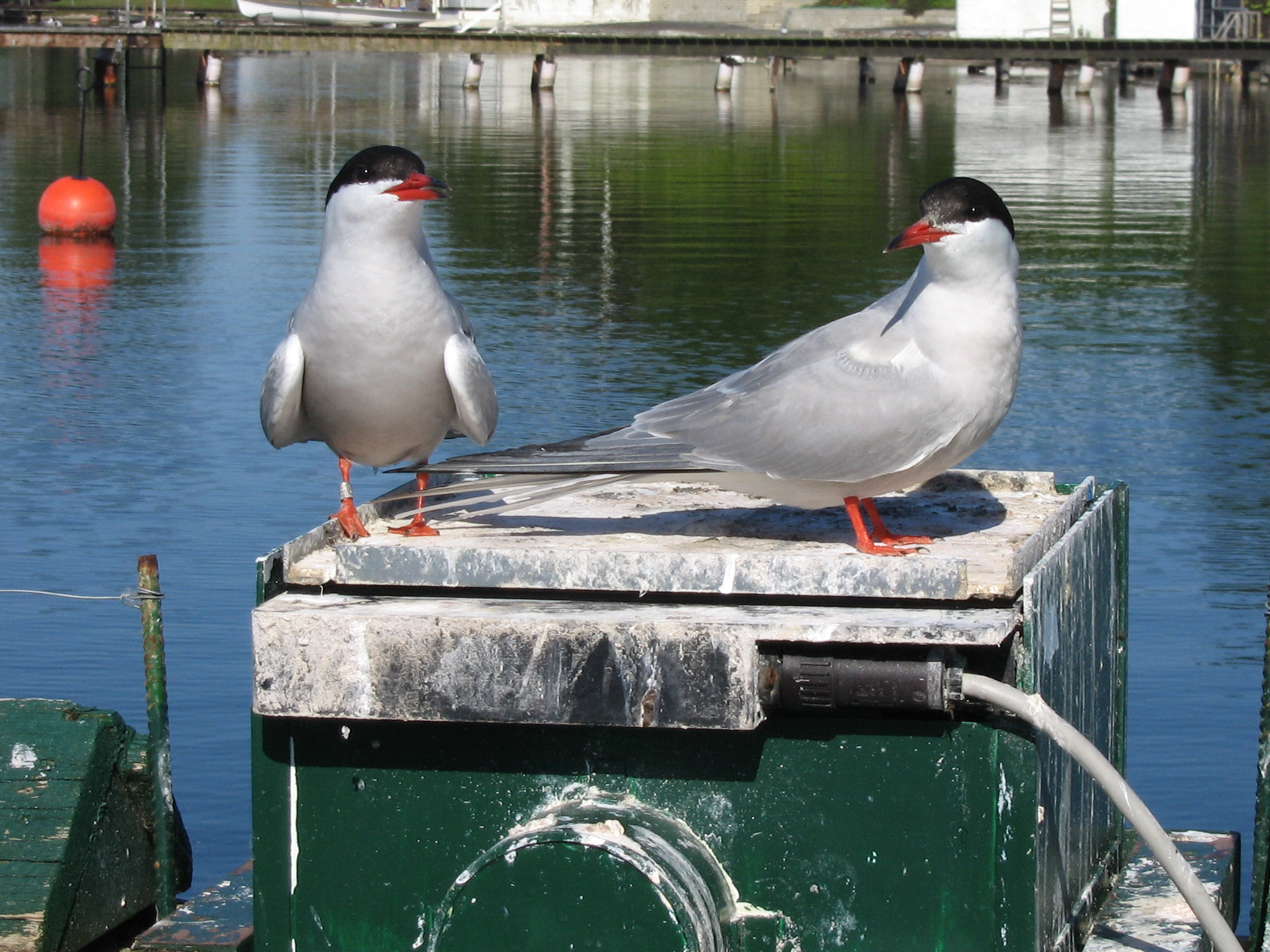
Marked common terns sitting on a box equipped with antenna and scales.

== Colony development ==
From an initial 90 breeding pairs the colony grew rapidly to a maximum of 530 pairs in 2005. Following several years of low breeding success, lower juvenile survival and delayed first breeding attempts, the colony was reduced to 430 pairs in 2011. This was most likely due to lack of food; breeding success is highly variable, dependent on food availability in the Wadden Sea. Banter See terns feed mostly on juvenile herring, sprat and smelt. The predation rate is low, since the islands are protected from terrestrial predators, but in some years there have been high losses caused by owls.

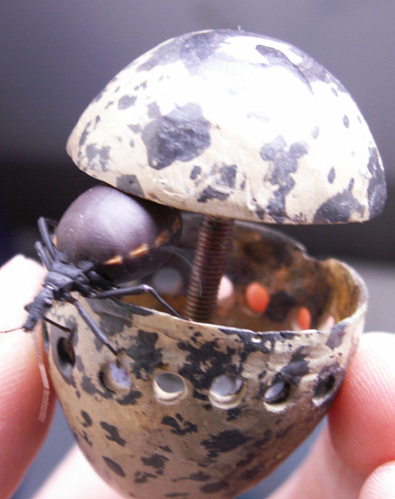
Bug being released from dummy egg after sucking blood from breeding bird.

== Methods ==
Since 1980 all chicks have been ringed and breeding success estimated. Since 1992, all fledglings (more than 5000 so far) also get a passive transponder inserted, identifying them individually. An automatic antenna recording system identifies individual terns when they return to the breeding site each season, without birds having to be trapped. Antennas are distributed in prominent places around the colonies and also placed around nests to identify breeding partners. Scales are also distributed around the colony, to record individual weights throughout the season. This system collects data on arrival dates, body weights, breeding partners and breeding success of hundreds of individuals each breeding season with minimal disturbance. These life histories provide important information on the population ecology of long-lived birds.

Terns tend to improve with age. Older birds arrive at the breeding site earlier and lay their eggs earlier than their younger counterparts. They increase their breeding success with age and experience, until around the age of 15, when senescence seems to set in. Despite senescence, birds that reach very old age have the highest life-time reproductive success.

Physiological analyses of hormones and other blood parameters, as well as genetic analyses are also performed at this colony. Blood samples of breeding birds are taken without trapping, as this reduces stress, which could change blood parameters, for example by increasing stress hormones. This is done using Mexican triatomine blood-sucking bugs (Dipetalogaster maxima), that are placed hungry into a hollowed-out dummy egg, which is placed into the nest of the brooding bird. The bug is able to suck blood through small holes in the wall of the dummy egg. The blood is subsequently extracted from the bug and analysed.
