= Horrie Bant =

Australian rules footballer (1882-1957)

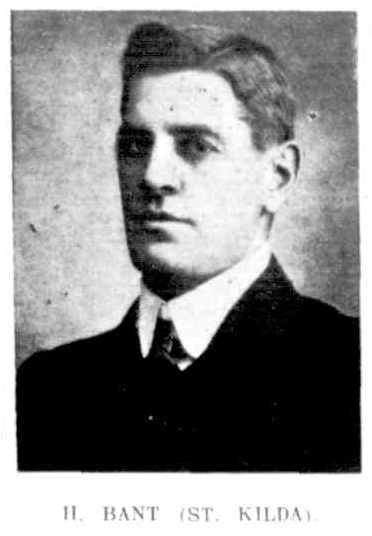
- Bant in 1907

Personal information
- Full name: William Horace Bray Bant
- Born: 22 September 1882; Clunes, Victoria
- Died: 6 May 1957 (aged 74); Perth, Western Australia
- Original team: Ballarat Imperials
- Positions: Centre half-back, Fullback

Playing career^{1}
Years	Club	Games (Goals)
1905	West Perth	15 (1)
1906–1909	St Kilda	52 (1)
1910	Essendon	12 (0)
1911–12, 1914, 1916–18	Subiaco	59
1913	Prahran	
- ^{1} Playing statistics correct to the end of 1918.

William Horace Bray "Horrie" Bant (22 September 1882 – 6 May 1957) was an Australian rules footballer who played with St Kilda and Essendon in the Victorian Football League (VFL).

Bant, who played mostly used as a centre half-back and fullback, started and ended his senior career in Western Australia. After originally playing for Ballarat Imperials, in early 1904 Bant moved to Western Australia and after playing in the Goldfields League for a few months was cleared to West Perth. He was a member of West Perth's 1905 premiership winning side.

He joined St Kilda for the 1906 VFL season and from his debut played 39 consecutive games. This included St Kilda's first ever final in 1907, with Bant the vice-captain.

After a season with Essendon in 1910, Bant returned to the West Australian Football League, this time playing for Subiaco. He played in another premiership in 1912 but missed their 1913 premiership win as he spent the season in Victoria with Prahran. Bant then returned to Subiaco and played for them in 1914 but missed another premiership the following year when he did not play a senior game.

He was involved in a fatal traffic accident in 1928 when the truck he was driving missed a corner and collided into a telegraph post. His passenger, former Subiaco teammate and coach Phil Matson, crashed into the pole and died two days later in hospital. Bant himself was injured but survived.
