= Jack Wunhym =

Australian rules footballer (1908–1965)

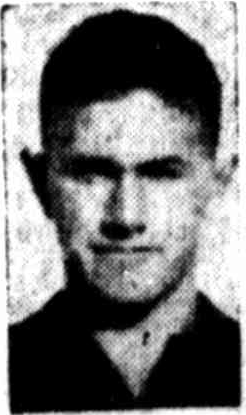

Personal information
- Full name: Jack Wunhym
- Born: 31 May 1908
- Died: 23 July 1965 (aged 57)
- Original team: Sunshine
- Height: 183 cm (6 ft 0 in)
- Weight: 96 kg (212 lb)

Playing career^{1}
| Years | Club | Games (Goals) |
| 1927–29 | Footscray | 10 (1) |
- ^{1} Playing statistics correct to the end of 1929.

Jack Wunhym (31 May 1908 – 23 July 1965) was an Australian rules footballer who played with Footscray in the Victorian Football League (VFL).

Wunhym played 88 games for Yarraville between 1929 and 1934.

Wunhym was on Fitzroy's list in 1934, but was unable to obtain a clearance from Yarraville.

Wunhym was captain-coach of Ballarat Imperials from 1935 to 1937, when the club won three consecutive Ballarat Football League premierships from 1935 to 1937.

His surname is a merger from the surname of his father, who was Chinese.
