= Wilhelmshaven =

Town in Lower Saxony, Germany

Wilhelmshaven Willemshaven (Low German)
- Town
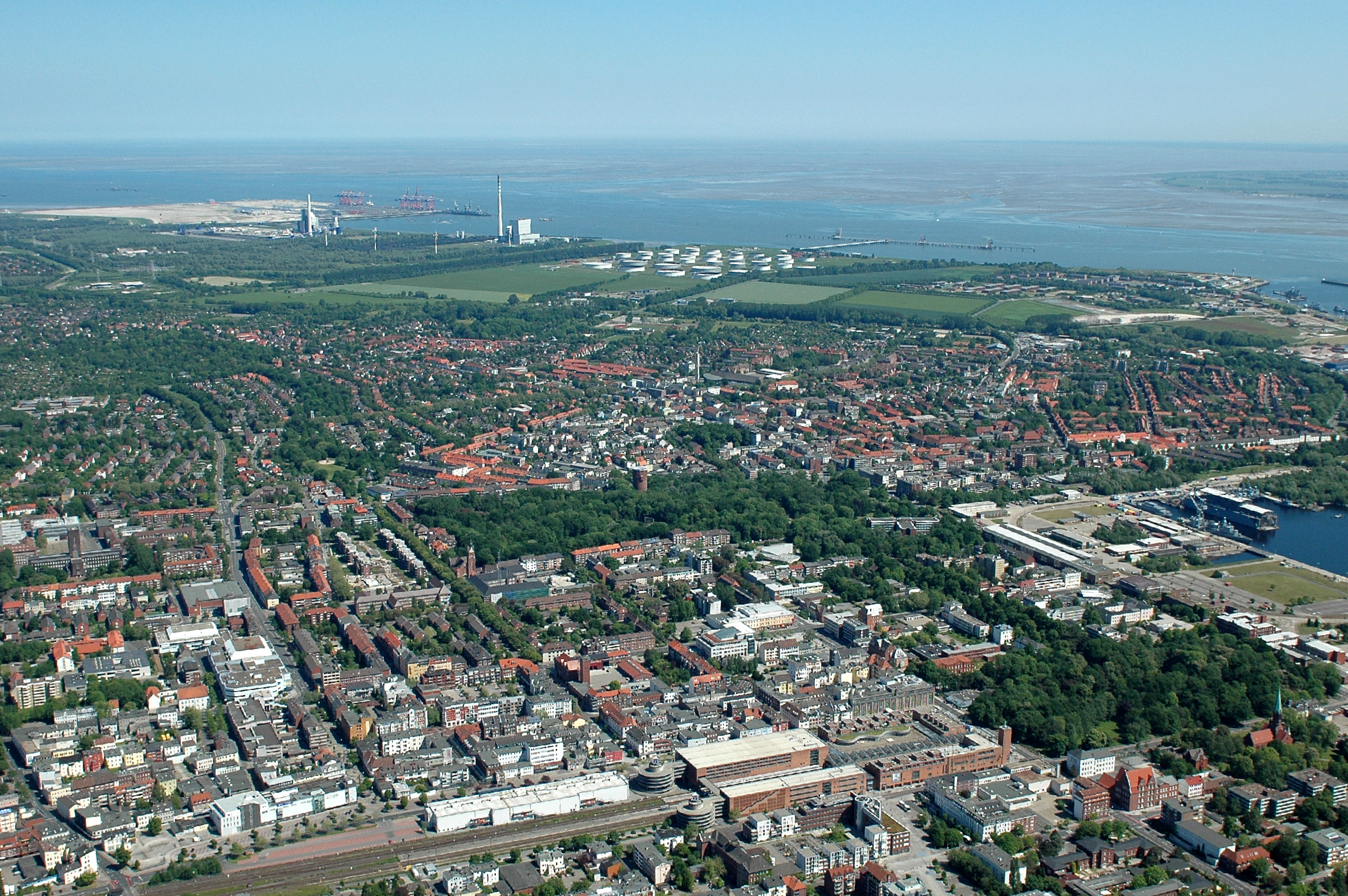

- Coat of arms
- Interactive map of Wilhelmshaven
- Location within Germany Location within Lower Saxony
- Coordinates: 53°31′43″N 08°06′20″E
- Country: Germany
- State: Lower Saxony
- District: Urban district

Government
  - Mayor (2026–31): Eva Maria Haarmann (Ind.)

Area
  - Total: 106.91 km^{2} (41.28 sq mi)
- Elevation: 2 m (6.6 ft)

Population (2025-12-31)
  - Total: 75,324
  - Density: 704.56/km^{2} (1,824.8/sq mi)
- Time zone: UTC+01:00 (CET)
  - Summer (DST): UTC+02:00 (CEST)
- Postal codes: 26351–26389
- Dialling codes: 04421, 04423, and 04425 (each partially)
- Vehicle registration: WHV
- Website: www.wilhelmshaven.de

Wilhelmshaven (German pronunciation: [ˌvɪlhɛlmsˈhaːfn̩], lit. 'William's Harbour'; Northern Low Saxon: Willemshaven) is a coastal town in Lower Saxony, Germany. It is situated on the western side of the Jade Bight, a bay of the North Sea, and has a population of 76,089. Wilhelmshaven is the centre of the "Jade Buse" business region (which has around 330,000 inhabitants) and is Germany's main military port.

The adjacent Lower Saxony Wadden Sea National Park (part of the Wattenmeer UNESCO World Natural Heritage Site) provides the basis for the major tourism industry in the region.

== History ==
The Siebethsburg castle, built before 1383, operated as a pirate stronghold; the Hanseatic League destroyed it in 1433. Four centuries later, the Kingdom of Prussia planned a fleet and a harbour on the North Sea. In 1853, Prince Adalbert of Prussia, a cousin of the Prussian King Frederick William IV, arranged the Jade Treaty (Jade-Vertrag) with the Grand Duchy of Oldenburg, in which Prussia and the Grand Duchy entered into a contract whereby Oldenburg ceded 3.13 km^{2} (1.21 sq mi) of its territory at the Jade Bight to Prussia. In 1869 King William I of Prussia (later also German Emperor) founded the town as an exclave of the Province of Hanover and a naval base for Prussia's developing fleet. All the hinterland of the city remained a part of Oldenburg.

Trams started running in 1913, and continued until 1945 when they were bombed. A shipbuilding yard developed at Wilhelmshaven, the Kaiserliche Werft Wilhelmshaven (Wilhelmshaven Imperial Shipyard). On 30 June 1934 the "pocket battleship" Admiral Graf Spee was launched at Wilhelmshaven. The battleship Scharnhorst was subsequently laid down a year afterward, before her commissioning in 1939. The biggest European warship of the second world war, the battleship "Tirpitz", was built at the same naval yard 1936-1941.

In 1937 Wilhelmshaven and the adjacent town of Rüstringen merged and the united city, named Wilhelmshaven, became a part of the Free State of Oldenburg.

=== World War II ===
During World War II (1939–1945), Wilhelmshaven served as the main base of the Kriegsmarine. Allied bombing destroyed two thirds of the town's buildings while the main target, the Naval Shipyard Wilhelmshaven, remained operational despite serious damage. A major attack on residential areas of Wilhelmshaven was carried out on 15 October 1944. Various churches, hospitals, schools and many residential buildings were destroyed or severely damaged. During the war, Alter Banter Weg (No. 1582 Wilhelmshaven), functioned as a subcamp of the Neuengamme concentration camp. On 28 April 1945 the Polish First Armored Division captured Wilhelmshaven, and took the surrender of the entire garrison, including over 200 ships of the Kriegsmarine. The Poles remained as part of the Allied occupation forces until 1947.

=== Since 1945 ===
In 1947 the city council decided to seek a new emblem for the city. After the Control Commission for Germany – British Element (CCG/BE) had rejected several designs, Wilhelmshaven selected the image of a Frisian warrior (Rüstringer Friese), designed after a nail man erected in the city during the First World War to collect war donations.

A trolley bus service was in operation from 1942-1960, taking over from the tram that was destroyed in the WW2 bombing.

Between 1947 and 1972 Wilhelmshaven was the home of Prince Rupert School, a comprehensive boarding school for children of British Army of the Rhine and Royal Air Force Germany personnel serving in West Germany. The school relocated to Rinteln in Lower Saxony in 1972, and closed in 2014. There is an active association of former Wilhelmshaven pupils called The Wilhelmshaven Association. After World War II the shipyard was totally disarmed under the British Commander in Chief, and of course many military buildings were damaged or vacant. While it was prohibited to establish any kind of military-linked businesses, Wilhelmshaven took the opportunity to provide a convenient location for Olympia Werke, which became one of the most popular quality typewriter factories in the world. A workforce of 7,000 worker was employed there in 1953.

== Today ==
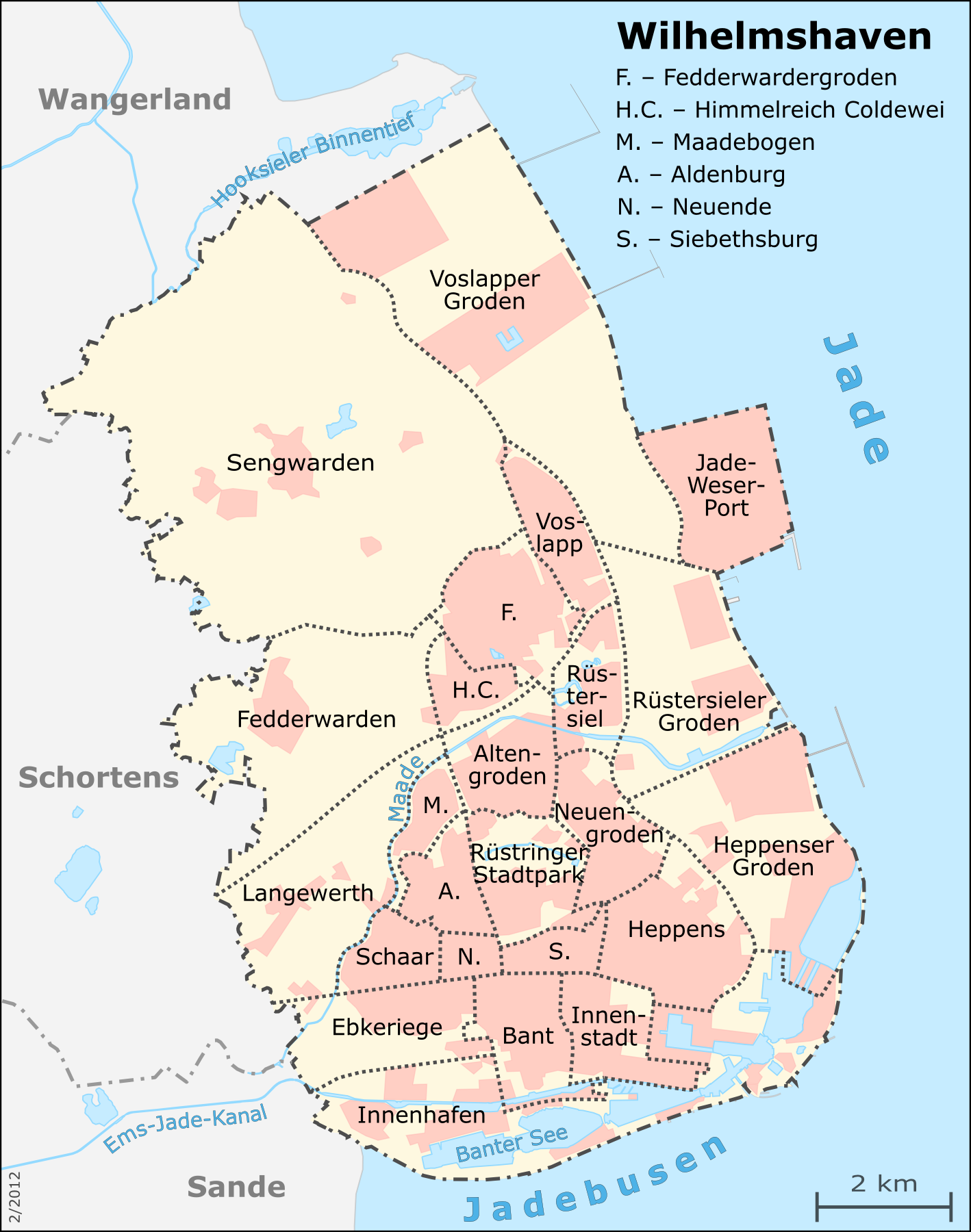
Wilhelmshaven and its city districts

Wilhelmshaven is Germany's only deep-water port, and its largest naval base. Concerning the new plans for the Bundeswehr which took shape in 2011 it has become the largest military base in Germany as well. The German defence forces (German Navy, navy arsenal, logistics centre) together with the public sector, are the main pillars of the local employment market.

The benefits of the deep shipping channel were already recognised at the end of the 1950s with the construction of the first oil tanker jetty. Wilhelmshaven has been the most important German import terminal for crude oil ever since. Pipelines from here supply refineries in the Rhine-Ruhr region and Hamburg. Other major business operations followed, and constructed jetties for crude oil and oil products, coal, and chemical products.

Planning for a liquefied natural gas terminal for LNG ships began in 2017, but regulatory impediments delayed construction for years.

Following the 2022 Russian invasion of Ukraine, as gas commitments from the Nord Stream 1 and Nord Stream 2 undersea Baltic pipelines became unreliable and then unavailable, construction of the Wilhelmshaven LNG terminal was rapidly accelerated from May 2022 to displace some of the pipeline gas imported from Russia. The terminal received its first load of LNG in December 2022.

Another element of the "Wilhelmshaven energy hub" programme is the chemical industry (refinery, PVC, and chlorine gas production), as well as power generation (two coal-fired power stations, wind power). Two short pipelines connect the LNG reception to the industrial zone.

One of the main industrial sectors in Wilhelmshaven is the port industry with its wharves, sea port service companies, service providers and repair businesses, transhipment and handling businesses, agencies, etc.... The "JadeWeserPort" – Container Terminal Wilhelmshaven (CTW), operational since 2012 and the development of the neighbouring Freight Village provide prospects for employment in areas such as logistics and distribution. In 2016 Eurogate increased transhipment volume up to 480,000 Container (TEU). And since Volkswagen is interested in using the deep-water facilities the number of employed workers is assumed to rise from 400 to 600.

== Geography and climate ==
Wilhelmshaven has an oceanic climate (Köppen: Cfb; Trewartha: Dolk). Wilhelmshaven is located on the coast of the North Sea and is influenced by a distinct maritime climate. The average temperature ranges from 1 °C (34 °F) in winter to 16 °C (61 °F) in summer, with warm winters and cool summers throughout the year.

The Wilhelmshaven weather station has recorded the following extreme values:

- Highest Temperature 36.0 °C (96.8 °F) on 9 August 1992.
- Lowest Temperature −19.8 °C (−3.6 °F) on 11 February 1929.
- Wettest Year 1,025.7 mm (40.38 in) in 1988.
- Driest Year 483.1 mm (19.02 in) in 1959.
- Highest Daily Precipitation: 75.2 mm (2.96 in) on 29 June 1981.
- Earliest Snowfall: 3 November 1919.
- Latest Snowfall: 14 April 1966.

Climate data for Wilhelmshaven, 1961–1990 normals, extremes 1916–1998
Month	Jan	Feb	Mar	Apr	May	Jun	Jul	Aug	Sep	Oct	Nov	Dec	Year
Record high °C (°F)	13.1 (55.6)	16.5 (61.7)	23.0 (73.4)	29.5 (85.1)	30.9 (87.6)	31.9 (89.4)	33.8 (92.8)	36.0 (96.8)	27.7 (81.9)	24.1 (75.4)	17.8 (64.0)	15.5 (59.9)	36.0 (96.8)
Mean maximum °C (°F)	9.0 (48.2)	9.5 (49.1)	14.3 (57.7)	20.9 (69.6)	24.3 (75.7)	27.3 (81.1)	28.2 (82.8)	28.2 (82.8)	23.8 (74.8)	19.8 (67.6)	13.9 (57.0)	10.7 (51.3)	29.6 (85.3)
Mean daily maximum °C (°F)	3.3 (37.9)	4.0 (39.2)	7.2 (45.0)	11.1 (52.0)	16.1 (61.0)	18.8 (65.8)	20.2 (68.4)	20.6 (69.1)	17.7 (63.9)	13.4 (56.1)	8.0 (46.4)	4.6 (40.3)	12.1 (53.8)
Daily mean °C (°F)	1.2 (34.2)	1.6 (34.9)	4.0 (39.2)	7.1 (44.8)	11.7 (53.1)	14.8 (58.6)	16.3 (61.3)	16.3 (61.3)	13.7 (56.7)	10.1 (50.2)	5.6 (42.1)	2.6 (36.7)	8.7 (47.7)
Mean daily minimum °C (°F)	−1.0 (30.2)	−0.9 (30.4)	1.2 (34.2)	3.6 (38.5)	7.6 (45.7)	10.8 (51.4)	12.6 (54.7)	12.6 (54.7)	10.4 (50.7)	7.2 (45.0)	3.3 (37.9)	0.4 (32.7)	5.6 (42.1)
Mean minimum °C (°F)	−8.4 (16.9)	−7.7 (18.1)	−4.8 (23.4)	−1.5 (29.3)	1.9 (35.4)	5.9 (42.6)	8.2 (46.8)	8.0 (46.4)	5.4 (41.7)	1.5 (34.7)	−3.2 (26.2)	−6.9 (19.6)	−11.2 (11.8)
Record low °C (°F)	−17.6 (0.3)	−19.8 (−3.6)	−15.2 (4.6)	−5.5 (22.1)	−1.8 (28.8)	0.5 (32.9)	5.2 (41.4)	5.0 (41.0)	2.0 (35.6)	−6.0 (21.2)	−10.2 (13.6)	−15.2 (4.6)	−19.8 (−3.6)
Average precipitation mm (inches)	70.4 (2.77)	43.0 (1.69)	60.7 (2.39)	51.8 (2.04)	63.5 (2.50)	72.6 (2.86)	83.0 (3.27)	78.6 (3.09)	73.3 (2.89)	71.5 (2.81)	86.8 (3.42)	75.9 (2.99)	831.2 (32.72)
Average extreme snow depth cm (inches)	6.4 (2.5)	7.6 (3.0)	3.8 (1.5)	0.4 (0.2)	0 (0)	0 (0)	0 (0)	0 (0)	0 (0)	0 (0)	1.9 (0.7)	4.9 (1.9)	12.9 (5.1)
Average precipitation days (≥ 0.1 mm)	19.2	14.3	16.7	14.7	15.3	14.5	17.1	15.8	16.4	16.0	20.0	20.0	200.0
Average relative humidity (%)	86.1	83.1	80.8	78.3	76.8	78.0	79.1	79.7	82.2	84.7	86.2	86.9	81.8
Source: Deutscher Wetterdienst / SKlima.de

== Sights ==
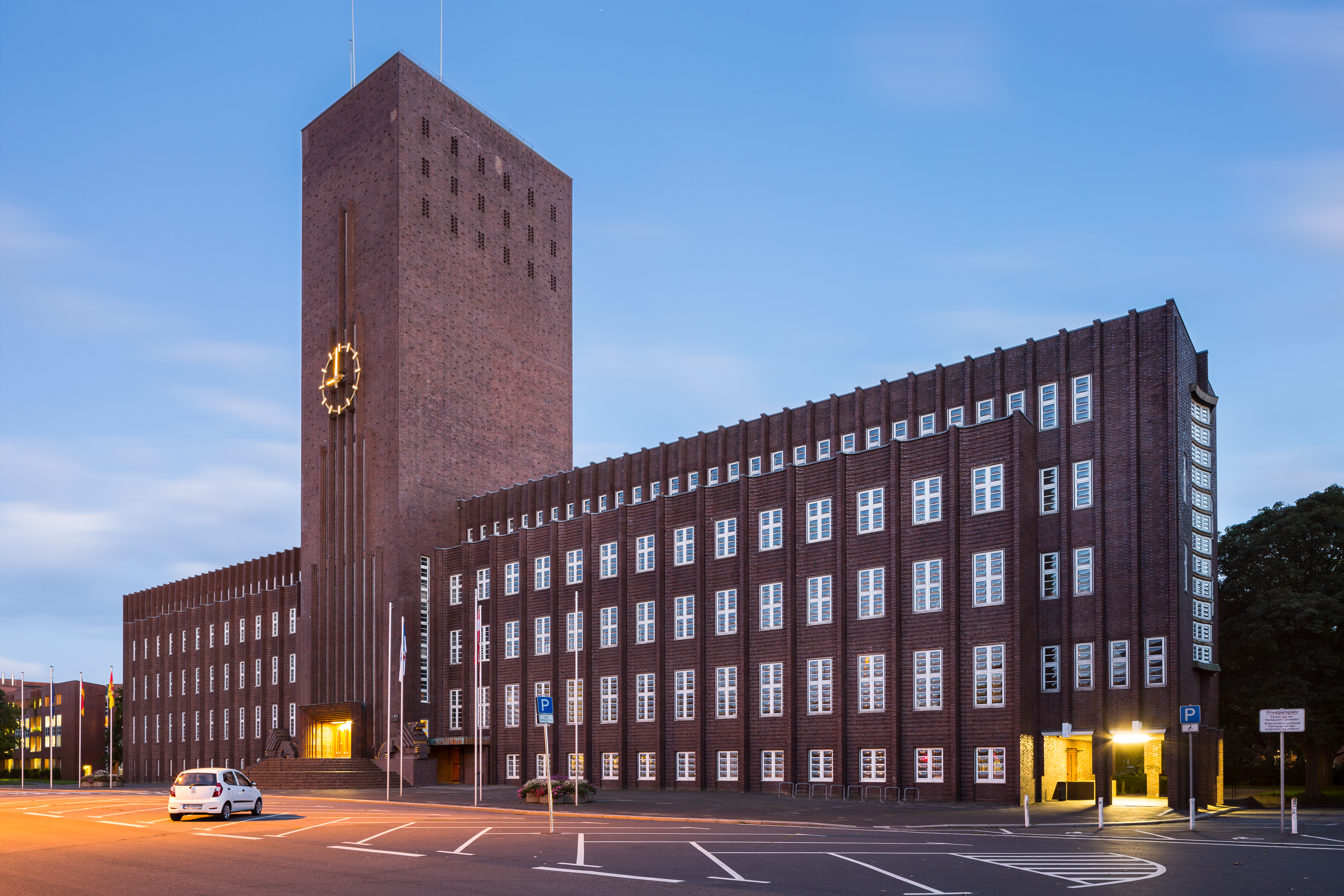
Town Hall

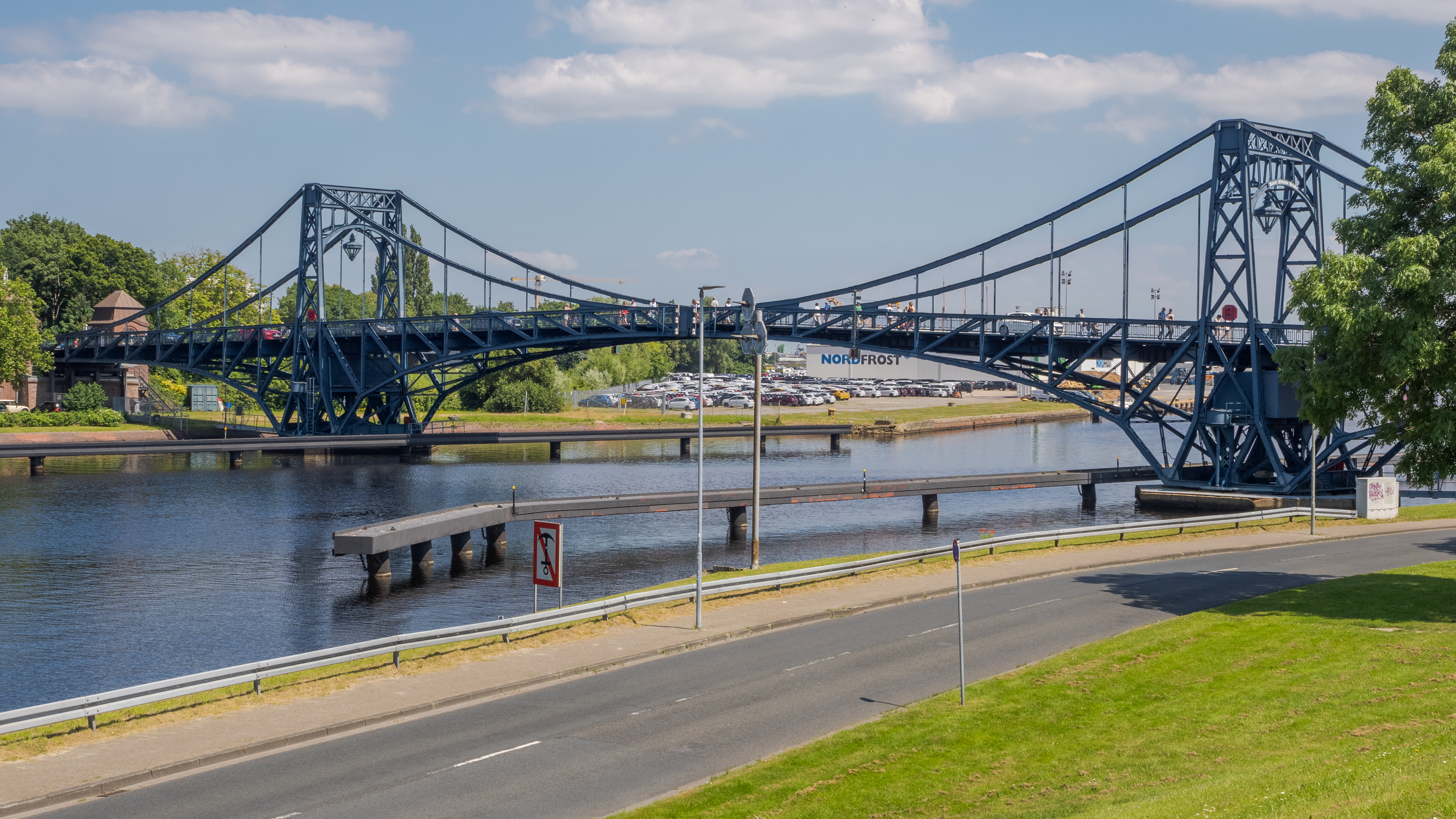
Kaiser Wilhelm Brücke

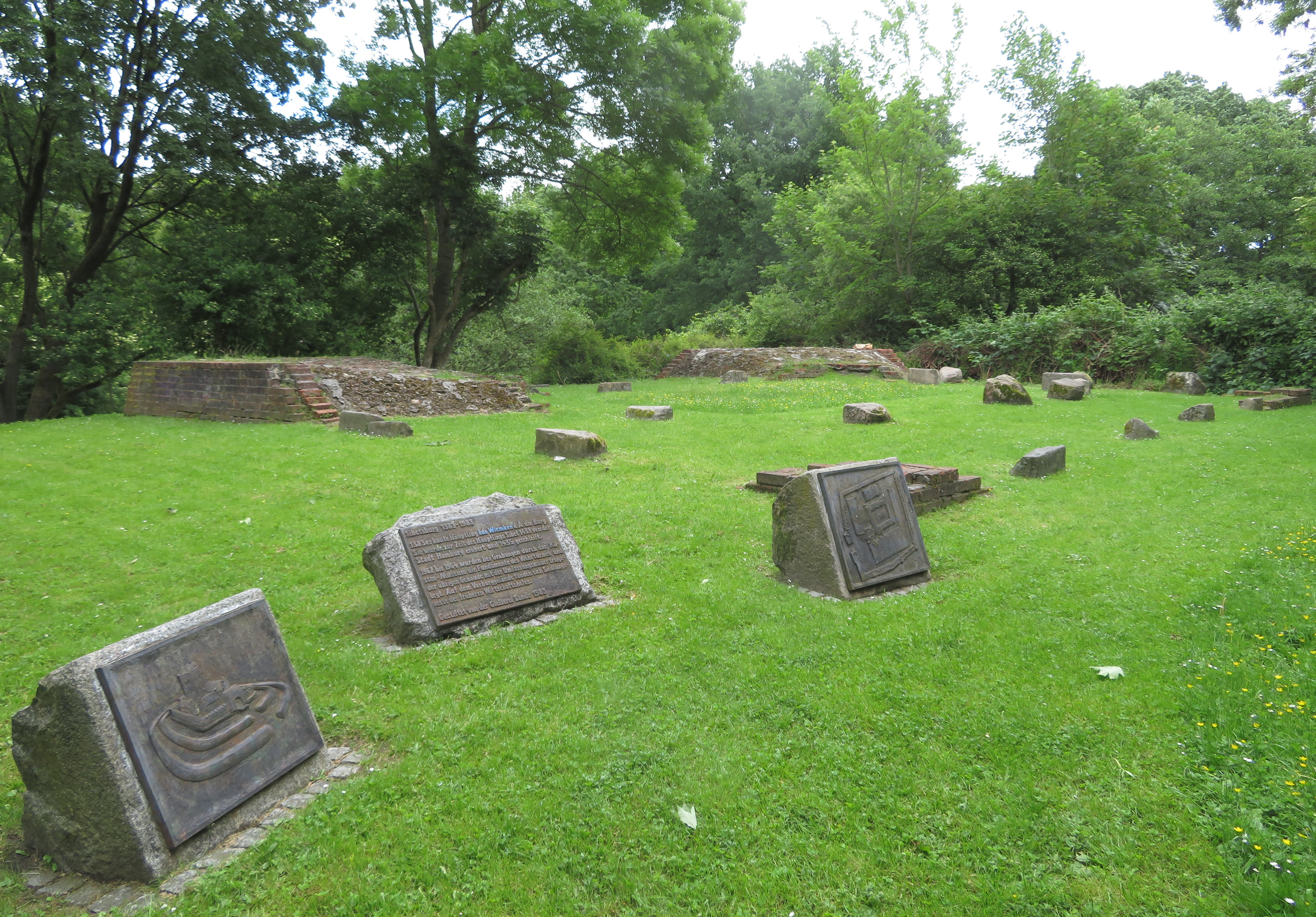
Ruins of Sibetsburg Castle

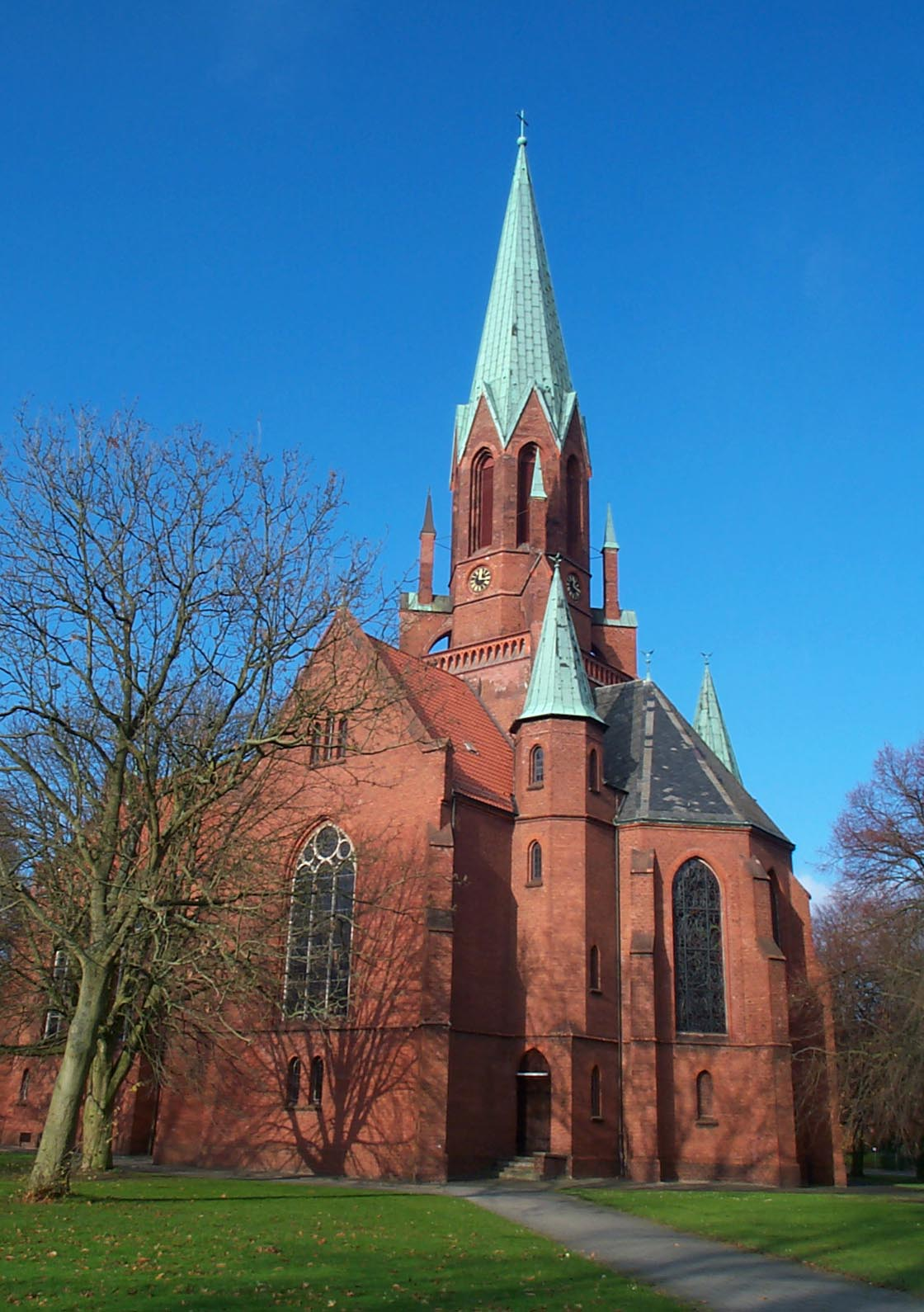
Christus-und-Garnisonskirche

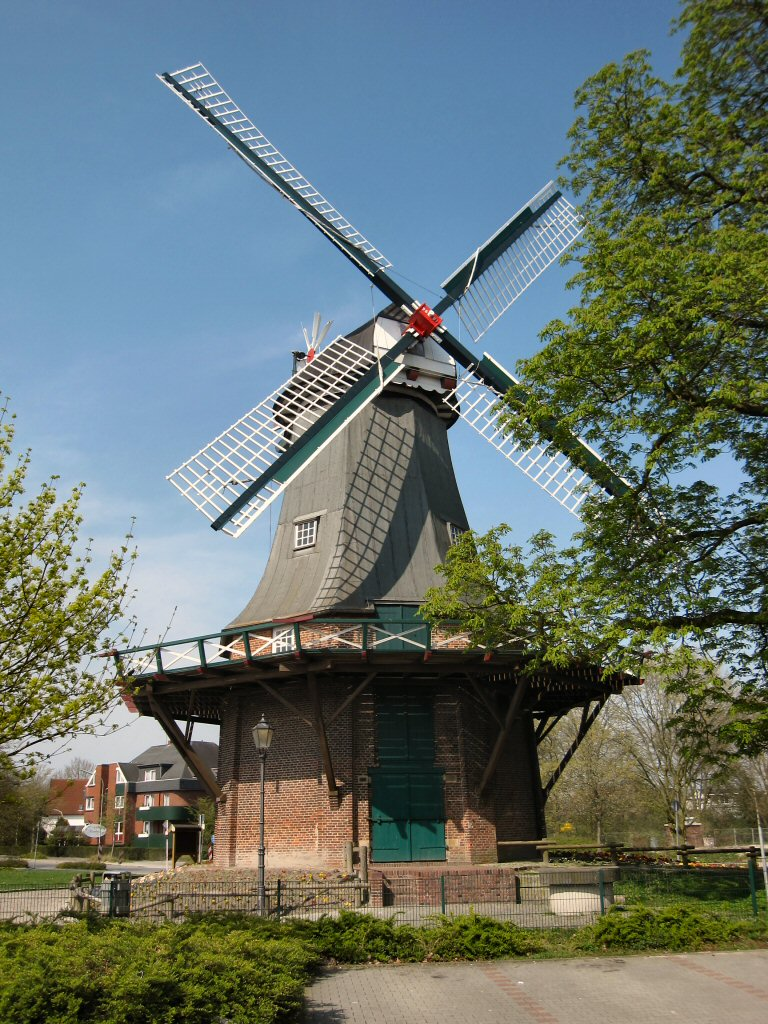
Windmill Kopperhörner Mühle

- The Jadestadion, the stadium of local club SV Wilhelmshaven
- Wasserturm Wilhelmshaven – water tower built in 1911 and a significant landmark of Wilhelmshaven city.
- Aquarium Wilhelmshaven, located on the Helgolandkai – a view of the oceans and underwater habitats around the world.
- The Botanischer Garten der Stadt Wilhelmshaven, a municipal botanical garden.
- The Deutsches Marinemuseum (Navy Museum), whose main exhibits are the former German Navy destroyer Mölders (D186), a submarine, and some smaller warships as well as an exhibition of German naval history from the 19th century onwards.
- UNESCO World Heritage Site Wadden Sea Visitor center. The large permanent interactive exhibition provides insight into the Wadden Sea environment. One of the special displays is the 14-metre-long skeleton of a sperm whale which beached on the island of Baltrum in 1994 and weighed 39 tonnes when alive. The whale's organs were preserved using plastination by Gunther von Hagens.
- The Küstenmuseum (Coastal Museum). The exhibition displays a broad spectrum of the past, present and future of the coast.
- The Bontekai, city harbor jetty, featuring the former light vessel "Weser" and the steam engine powered buoy layer "Kapitän Meyer", an active museum ship. During the "Jade Weekend" (late June) it is berth of tall sailing ships, too.
- The double swing bridge Kaiser-Wilhelm-Brücke ("Emperor Wilhelm Bridge") crosses an inlet of the Jade Bight. It was built from 1905 to 1907 and is considered to be one of Wilhelmshaven's landmarks.
- The Town Hall (Rathaus), a large brick building, constructed from 1927 to 1929 by the architect Fritz Höger as the town hall of the city of Rüstringen. It was severely damaged by bombs in 1944 and rebuilt from 1948 to 1953.
- Ruins of Sibetsburg Castle. It was built in 1383, conquered and dismantled in 1435.
- The oldest church of the city is St. Jakobi Church at Neuende which was built about 1383 under the direction of the chieftain of Jever Edo Wiemken. The Christus-und-Garnisionskirche, built in 1869 by the Prussian architect Friedrich Adler was heavily damaged by bombs in 1942 and rebuilt after the war.
- Kopperhörner Mühle is a windmill dating from 1839 which was renovated in 1982 and 2000.
- Kaiser-Wilhelm-Denkmal at the Friedrich-Wilhelm-Platz, a monument erected in memory of emperor Wilhelm I of Prussia in 1896, who was one of the founder of the city. After the statue had been melted down in 1942, it was reconstructed in 1994.
- The entrance building of the former Kaiserliche Marinewerft ("emperor's shipyard"), built in the 1870s.
- The building of the former Kaiserliche Westwerft ("emperor's western shipyard"), completed in 1913.

Every year in the first days of July, the big "Weekend on the Jade" event attracts hundreds of thousands of visitors to the big port, the southern beach and the navy arsenal. Another big event takes place at the end of the sailing season at the beginning of October when two dozen large sailing ships dock in Wilhelmshaven as part of the "JadeWeserPort Cup".

== Notable people ==
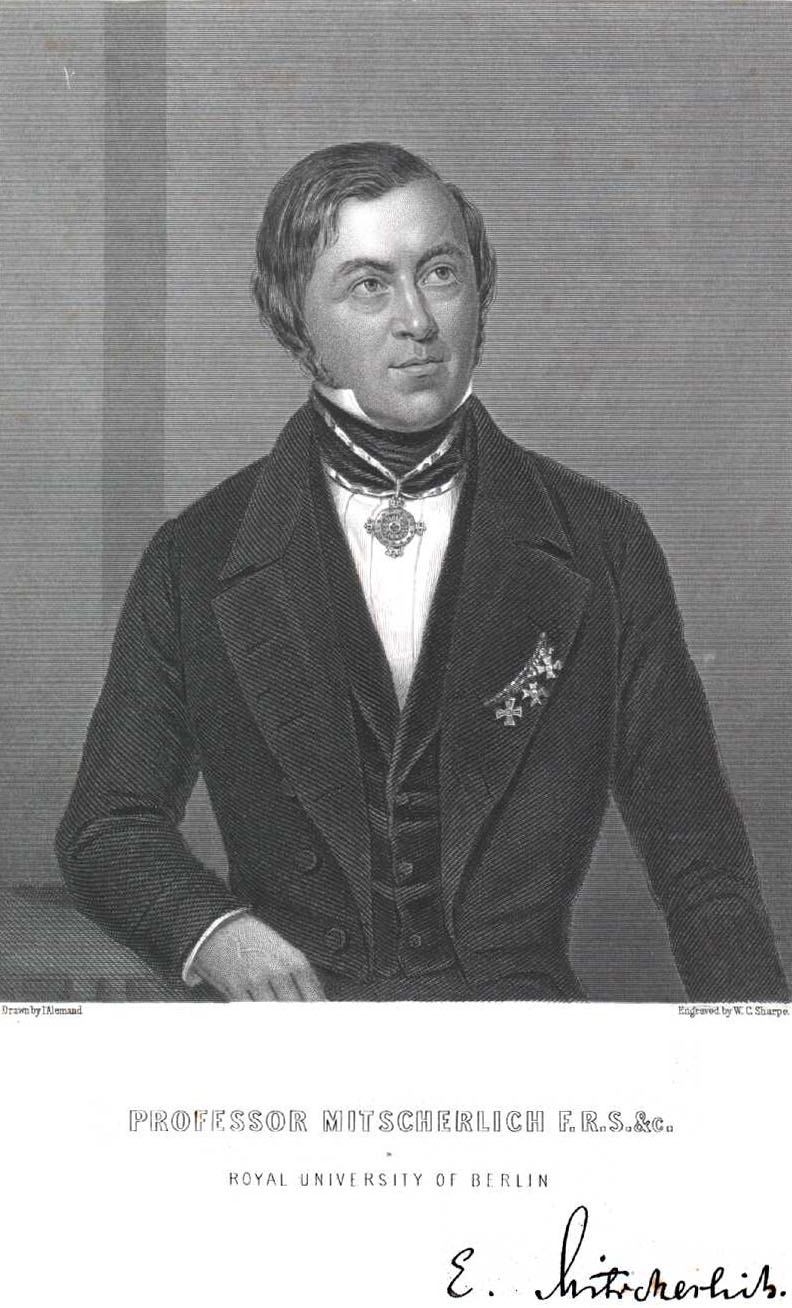
Drawing of Eilhard Mitscherlich

- August Friedrich Wilhelm Crome (1753–1833), economist and statistician; produced a thematic map of Europe
- Eilhard Mitscherlich (1794–1863) a chemist, discovered crystallographic isomorphism in 1819.
- Erhard Milch (1892–1972), field marshal who oversaw the development of the Luftwaffe
- Ernst Paul Heinz Prüfer (1896–1934), Jewish mathematician
- Hans Hellmann (1903–1938), theoretical physicist; associated with the Hellmann–Feynman theorem
- Heinrich Seetzen (1906–1945), lawyer and Gestapo official; Holocaust perpetrator
- Adalbert von Blanc (1907–1976), naval officer in WWII and admiral in the West German Navy.
- Klaus Riedel (1907–1944), rocket pioneer, worked on the V-2 missile programme at Peenemünde
- Otto von Bülow (1911–2006), U-boat commander in World War II, and captain in the Bundesmarine
- Henry Picker (1912–1988), lawyer, stenographer and author, co-transcribed Hitler's Table Talk
- Wilfried Struve (1914–1992), scientist working in astronomy and acoustics, son of Georg Hermann Struve
- Hans Clarin (1929–2005), actor and voice actor in children's audio plays
- Karl Leister (born 1937), clarinetist with the Berlin Philharmonic Orchestra
- Konrad Krauss (born 1938), actor
- Hans-Michael Bock (born 1947), film historian, filmmaker, translator and writer.
- Rainer Fetting (born 1949), painter and sculptor
- Thomas Hengelbrock (born 1958), violinist, stage director and principal conductor of the NDR Symphony Orchestra
- Nico Beyer (born 1964), film director and producer
- Olaf Lies (born 1967), local politician (SPD)
- Niels Högel (born 1976), former nurse, serial killer, convicted of the murders of 85 people
- Wolfgang Peter Menzel (1942-2001), director of chairman for BCT Technology AG, victim of the September 11 attacks

=== Sport ===
- Maren Brinker, volleyball player
- Kurt Doerry (1874–1947) track and field athlete, competed at the 1896 & 1900 Summer Olympics.
- Helmut Reichmann (1941–1992), a glider pilot, thrice World Gliding Champion
- Steffen Puttkammer (born 1988), footballer who has played over 390 games
- Sebastian Polter (born 1991), footballer who has played over 350 games
- Kai Pröger (born 1992), footballer who has played over 320 games

== Twin towns – sister cities ==
Wilhelmshaven is twinned with:

- Vichy, France (1965)
- Norfolk, Virginia, United States (1976)
- Dunfermline, Scotland, United Kingdom (1979)
- Bromberg, Austria (1980)
- Bydgoszcz, Poland (2006)

== See also ==
- Lake Bant

== General sources ==
- Official German list of concentration camps Verzeichnis der Konzentrationslager und ihrer Außenkommandos (in German)
- Camp memorial Neuengamme (in German)
