= Chris Bant =

Australian rules footballer

Personal information
- Full name: Christopher John Bant
- Born: 21 February 1881; Clunes, Victoria
- Died: 22 November 1949 (aged 68); Omeo, Victoria
- Original team: Ballarat Imperials

Playing career^{1}
Years	Club	Games (Goals)
1907–08	St Kilda	27 (2)
1912	Geelong	3 (0)
Total		30 (2)
- ^{1} Playing statistics correct to the end of 1912.

Christopher John Bant (21 February 1881 – 22 November 1949) was an Australian rules footballer who played with St Kilda and Geelong in the Victorian Football League (VFL).
