= Frank Finn (footballer) =

Australian rules footballer, born 1911

Personal information
- Full name: Frank Albert Austin Finn
- Born: 18 November 1911; Warracknabeal
- Died: 9 May 2010 (aged 98)
- Original team: Ballarat Imperials

Playing career^{1}
Years	Club	Games (Goals)
1934	Carlton	4 (0)
1936–37	Footscray	3 (2)
Total		7 (2)
- ^{1} Playing statistics correct to the end of 1937.

Frank Albert Austin Finn (18 November 1911 – 9 May 2010) was an Australian rules footballer who played with Carlton and Footscray in the Victorian Football League (VFL).

In two years with Footscray in 1936 and 1937, Finn played three senior matches and kicked two goals. But the highlight of his time at the Western Oval came in the 1936 Reserves Grand Final, when Frank played on a wing and the Bulldogs beat the heavily favoured Melbourne.

In 1938 he was on the move again, and crossed to Camberwell in the VFA. He became a stalwart in the centre for the Tricolours, and went on to play more than 100 games – although his football career was interrupted in 1942 when he enlisted for active service with the Australian Army in World War II.

Finn later umpired in the VFA and was appointed coach of Noble Park Football Club in 1949.
