= South Williamstown Football Club =

Australian rules football club (1886–1888)

South Williamstown
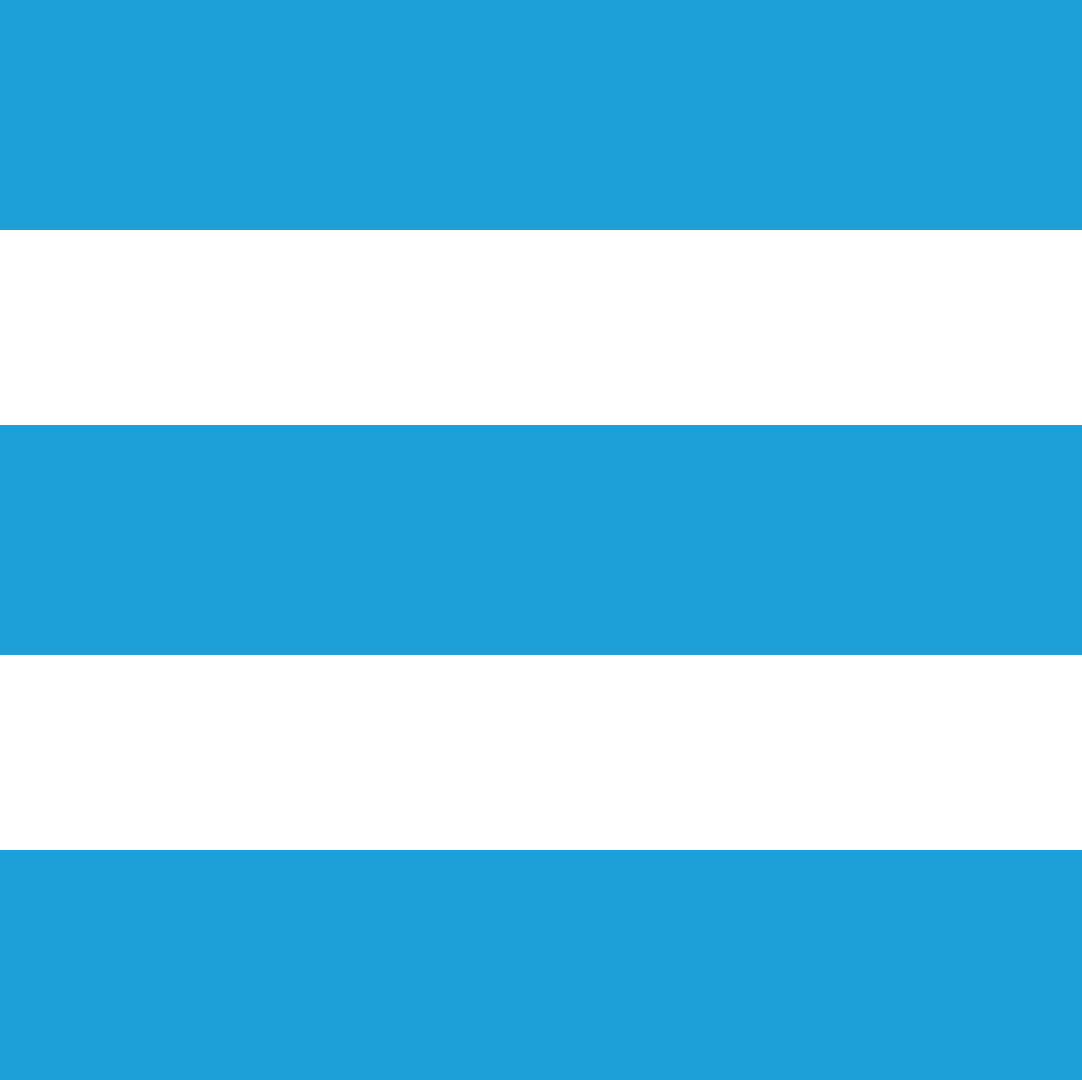

Names
- Full name: South Williamstown Football Club

Club details
- Founded: 27 March 1886; 139 years ago
- Dissolved: 8 February 1888; 137 years ago
- Competition: Victorian Football Association (1886–1887)

The South Williamstown Football Club was an Australian rules football club that competed in the Victorian Football Association (VFA) for two seasons in the 1880s. The club wore light blue and white on its jumper, similar to Hotham.

== History ==
=== Formation ===
When it joined the VFA, the Williamstown Football Club sought to play its matches at the Williamstown Cricket Ground, but was not granted permission owing to a dispute with the Williamstown Cricket Club, and instead used the unfenced Garden's Reserve as its home ground.

On 27 March 1886, players wishing to play on the cricket established a rival senior club, the South Williamstown Football Club. Local newspaper articles in 1885 had referred to another "South Williamstown Football Club" which competed in local competitions as a junior club, prior to the establishment of the senior club.

=== 1886 and 1887 seasons ===
South Williamstown joined the VFA in 1886 and finished its inaugural season with a positive record of 6–3–5 against senior clubs, but achieved it without playing any of the teams ranked in the top five by the Sportsman.

In its second (and final) season in 1887, South Williamstown won only three of its 18 games, finishing the season with two draws and 13 losses. The club was ranked third-last by the Sportsman, only above South Ballarat and Footscray.

=== Amalgamation with Williamstown ===
On 8 February 1888, the dispute was settled and South Williamstown amalgamated with Williamstown; and, through an organisational affiliation with the cricket club the Williamstown Cricket Ground was established as the football club's permanent home ground.

Although South Williamstown and Williamstown were off-field rivals, the clubs never played a match against each other.
