= Lake Bant =

- Banter See (German)
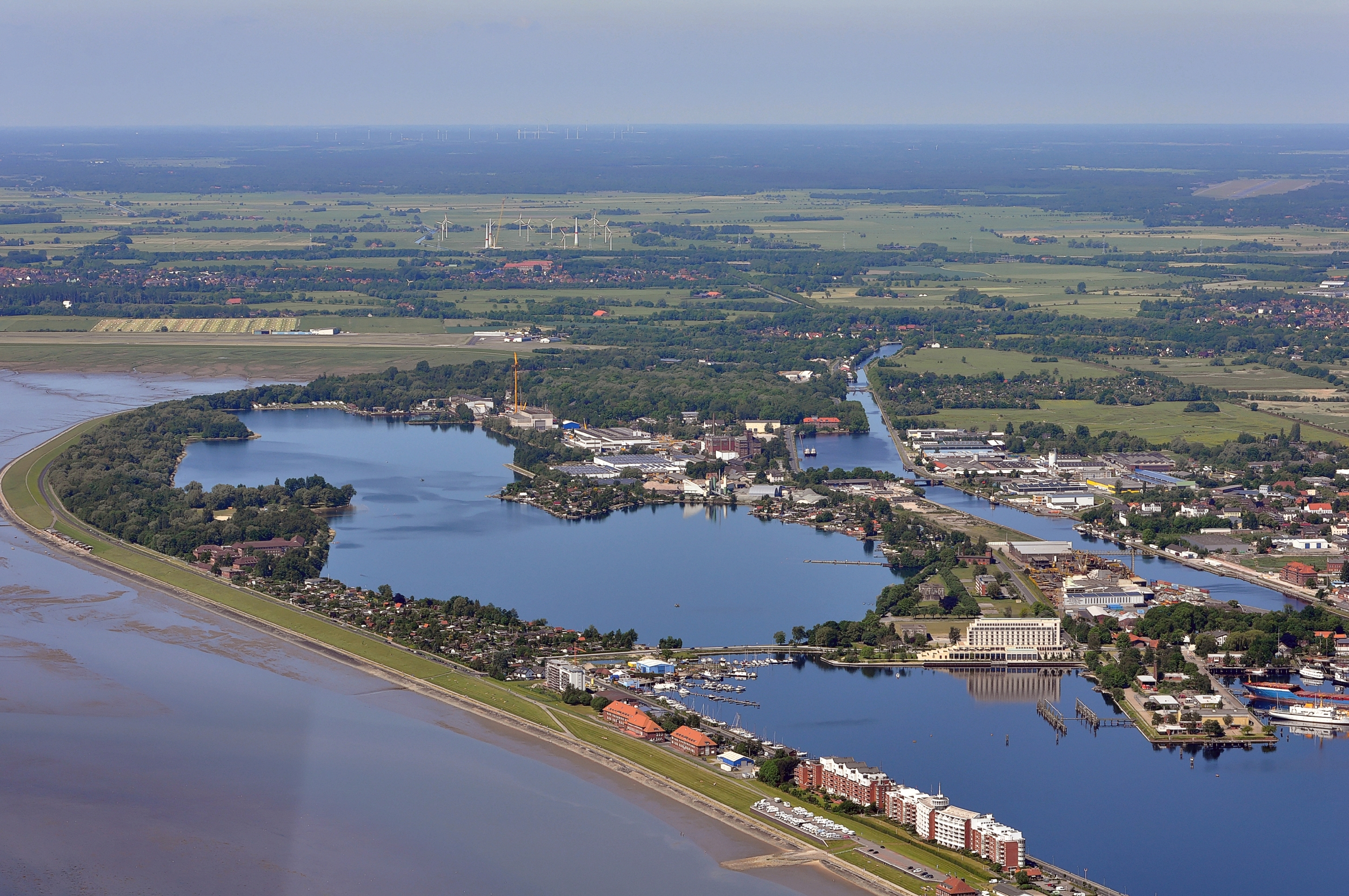
- Aerial view of Lake Bant, with Jade Bight at bottom left

- Location within Germany
- Location: Wilhelmshaven, Lower Saxony, Germany
- Coordinates: 53°30′25″N 08°05′50″E
- Max. length: 2.6 km (1.6 mi)
- Max. width: 0.5 km (0.31 mi)

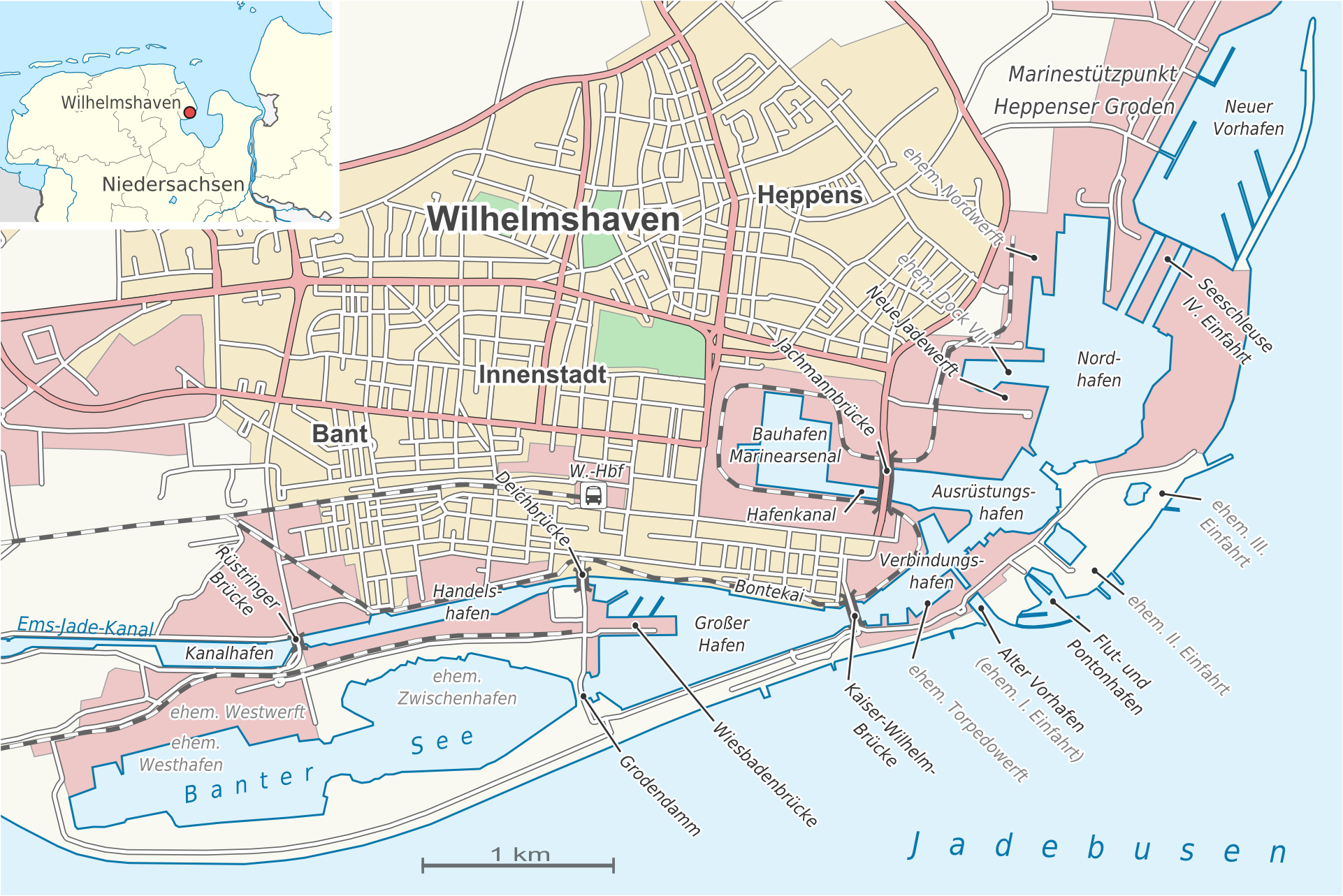
Map of Wilhelmshaven with Lake Bant at bottom

Lake Bant, or Banter See in German, is an artificial lake in the North Sea port city of Wilhelmshaven in north-west Germany. It is about 2.6 kilometres (1.6 mi) long and 0.5 kilometres (0.31 mi) wide. It was originally part of the harbour complex created by enclosing part of Jade Bight bordering the city's waterfront for military and industrial use. It used to contain naval facilities, including a submarine base. Now separated from the port, it is used mainly for recreation and research. It is surrounded by parkland, recreational facilities, up-market housing, research institutes and company offices.

== See also ==
- Lake Bant tern colony
