= Glyn Thomas =

Australian rules footballer

Personal information
- Full name: Glyn Thomas
- Born: 9 December 1882
- Died: 1 February 1967 (aged 84)
- Original team: Ballarat Imperials

Playing career^{1}
Years	Club	Games (Goals)
1905	St Kilda	2 (1)
- ^{1} Playing statistics correct to the end of 1905.

Glyn Thomas (9 December 1882 – 1 February 1967) was an Australian rules footballer who played with St Kilda in the Victorian Football League (VFL).
