= 1886 VFA season =

10th season of the Victorian Football Association

Overview
- Date: 1 May – 2 October 1886
- Teams: 15
- Premiers: Geelong; 7th premiership
- Leading goalkicker: Phil McShane (Geelong − 51 goals)

The 1886 VFA season was the tenth season of the Victorian Football Association (VFA), the highest-level senior Australian rules football competition in Victoria.

Geelong won the premiership for the seventh time. It was the club's last VFA premiership won by its senior team.

== Association membership ==
The senior membership of the Association increased substantially in 1886, from ten clubs in 1885 to a record-high fifteen clubs in 1886. Four clubs were elevated from junior to senior status: Port Melbourne (maroon and navy blue), Footscray (red, white and blue), St Kilda (red and black) and Prahran (light blue and dark blue). The fifth new club was the newly established South Williamstown Football Club (light blue and white), which came into existence out of a dispute between the existing Williamstown Football Club and the Williamstown Cricket Club: the football club was unable to agree to terms with the cricket club for use of the Williamstown Cricket Ground, forcing the football club to play its matches without charging for admission at the unfenced Gardens Reserve; so the rival South Williamstown Football Club was established, and received permission to play its matches at the cricket ground.

At this time, five other provincial senior clubs were full Association members represented on the Board of Management: Ballarat, Ballarat Imperial, South Ballarat, Horsham Trades and Horsham Unions. Due to distance, these clubs played too few matches against the rest of the VFA to be considered relevant in the premiership.

== Premiership season ==
The 1886 season was dominated by Geelong and South Melbourne, the clubs which had between them won all of the previous eight premierships. When the two clubs played their second match against each other for the season on 4 September, both clubs were still undefeated for the year – and, in fact, South Melbourne was undefeated since 1884 – and as such, assuming both clubs continued winning in the final month of the season, this match became seen as a de facto premiership deciding match for the season. The match generated unprecedented public interest, with 25,000–30,000 attending the South Melbourne Cricket Ground – despite the venue being suitable to accommodate around half that number – and the venue took more than £750 at the gate. Geelong comfortably outplayed South Melbourne in the match, and won by the score of 4.19 to 1.5. Geelong went on to remain undefeated for the season and was awarded the premiership, its seventh in nine seasons; South Melbourne's loss to Geelong was its only for the season, and it finished as runners-up. Carlton finished third.

== Club records ==
The below table details the playing records of the fifteen clubs in all matches during the 1886 season. Two sets of results are given:

- Senior results: based only upon games played against other VFA senior clubs
- Total results: including senior games, and games against intercolonial, up-country and junior clubs.

The clubs are listed in the order in which they were ranked in the Sportsman newspaper. The VFA had no formal process by which the clubs were ranked, so the below order should be considered indicative only, particularly since the fixturing of matches was not standardised; this was more noticeably the case in the 1886 season than in other seasons, as the five new senior clubs played few matches against the stronger long-established clubs.

South Williamstown, for example, finished with a positive record of 6–3–5 against senior clubs in its first season, but achieved it without playing any of the teams ranked in the top five by the Sportsman. The top three placings were later acknowledged in publications including the Football Record and are considered official.

Pos	Team	Senior results						Total results					
Pos	Team	Pld	W	L	D	GF	GA	Pld	W	L	D	GF	GA
1	Geelong (P)	17	15	0	2	128	23	25	23	0	2	199	51
2	South Melbourne	20	17	1	2	97	46	22	19	1	2	119	51
3	Carlton	20	13	6	1	112	77	22	15	6	1	125	80
	Melbourne	19	10	8	1	65	59	24	13	10	1	79	75
	Williamstown	23	11	10	2	78	83	25	13	10	2	88	84
	Fitzroy	21	10	9	2	73	66	23	10	11	2	77	73
	Port Melbourne	19	9	6	4	65	44	23	12	7	4	82	57
	South Williamstown	14	6	3	5	53	39	19	10	3	6	70	46
	Hotham	20	7	7	6	62	70	21	8	7	6	68	78
	St Kilda	17	6	9	2	51	96	21	6	11	4	60	109
	Essendon	18	6	11	1	55	79	22	7	13	2	61	86
	Richmond	21	5	15	1	47	87	23	5	17	1	52	96
	Prahran	13	3	8	2	32	62	18	6	8	4	57	78
	Footscray	16	2	9	5	29	50	18	3	9	6	34	56
	University	20	0	18	2	28	88	21	1	18	2	34	91

(P) Premiers

== Awards ==
- Phil McShane (Geelong) set an Association record by kicking 51 goals for the season (40 in senior matches); the record stood until 1892.
- The second twenty (reserves) premiership was won by Hotham. South Melbourne also claimed the premiership.

== Intercolonial matches ==
A New South Wales representative team toured Victoria during May, playing one fully representative match intercolonial match against an Association representative team.

	1886 Intercolonial Matches
Saturday, 22 May	Victoria 8.20	def.	New South Wales 3.3	Melbourne Cricket Ground (crowd: 12,000)

== Notable events ==
- From 1886, Association matches were played in four quarters instead of two halves. This was primarily done to allow more frequent changes of end, to ensure that changing wind and sunlight conditions were more evenly shared between the teams.
- The Laws of the Game were first amended to allow for a game to be patrolled by up to four boundary umpires, at the agreement of the captains, to execute boundary throw-ins instead of the field umpire. They were used on no more than a couple of occasions during the season, and the provision was removed from the laws again at the end of the season.

== See also ==
- 1886 Victorian football season
