= Harold Stanley (footballer) =

Australian rules footballer

Personal information
- Full name: Harold Stanley
- Born: 4 August 1883
- Died: 25 September 1945 (aged 62)
- Original team: Ballarat Imperials

Playing career^{1}
Years	Club	Games (Goals)
1906	Melbourne	1 (0)
- ^{1} Playing statistics correct to the end of 1906.

Harold Stanley (4 August 1883 – 25 September 1945) was an Australian rules footballer who played with Melbourne in the Victorian Football League (VFL).
