= Stan McKenzie (footballer) =

Australian rules footballer

- McKenzie in May 1925

Personal information
- Full name: Alfred Stanley Dudley McKenzie
- Born: 30 August 1896; Myamyn, Victoria
- Died: 13 September 1985 (aged 89); Mont Albert, Victoria
- Original team: Port Melbourne Juniors
- Height: 173 cm (5 ft 8 in)
- Weight: 75 kg (165 lb)
- Position: Back

Playing career^{1}
Years	Club	Games (Goals)
1918	Collingwood	9 (0)
1919–1920	North Melbourne (VFA)	39 (1)
1921–1924	Hawthorn (VFA)	61 (1)
1925	Hawthorn	17 (0)

Representative team honours
Years	Team	Games (Goals)
1925	Victoria	3 (0)
- ^{1} Playing statistics correct to the end of 1925.

Alfred Stanley Dudley McKenzie (30 August 1896 – 13 September 1985) was an Australian rules footballer who played with Collingwood and Hawthorn in the Victorian Football League (VFL).

== Early life ==
The son of Archibald McKenzie and Martha McKenzie, nee Bardsley, Alfred Stanley Dudley McKenzie was born 30 August 1896.

McKenzie grew up on a farm in Myamyn near Heywood, Victoria but later moved to Melbourne. He enlisted in 1915 and fought in World War I before returning to Australia two years later.

== Football ==
McKenzie embarked on his football career with Port Melbourne juniors before transferring to Collingwood, playing nine games during the 1918 VFL season. In 1919 he crossed to North Melbourne in the Victorian Football Association (VFA) where he played for two seasons. In 1921 he joined Hawthorn where he became a stalwart of that club's final three seasons in the VFA, winning its Most Consistent Player Trophy in 1922. McKenzie played every game for Hawthorn in their first VFL season in 1925. A talented and hard to beat half-back, he became the first Hawthorn player to gain selection for Victoria in 1925. He retired at the end of the 1925 season.

McKenzie was captain-coach of Ballarat Imperials from 1926 to 1928.

== Later life ==
In 1919 Stan McKenzie married Nellie May Walsh and they had three children. He continued his football involvement as coach of the Auburn Football Club and worked as a postman.

Stan McKenzie died in 1985, aged 89.
