= Williamstown Cricket Ground =

Sporting venue in Williamstown, Victoria

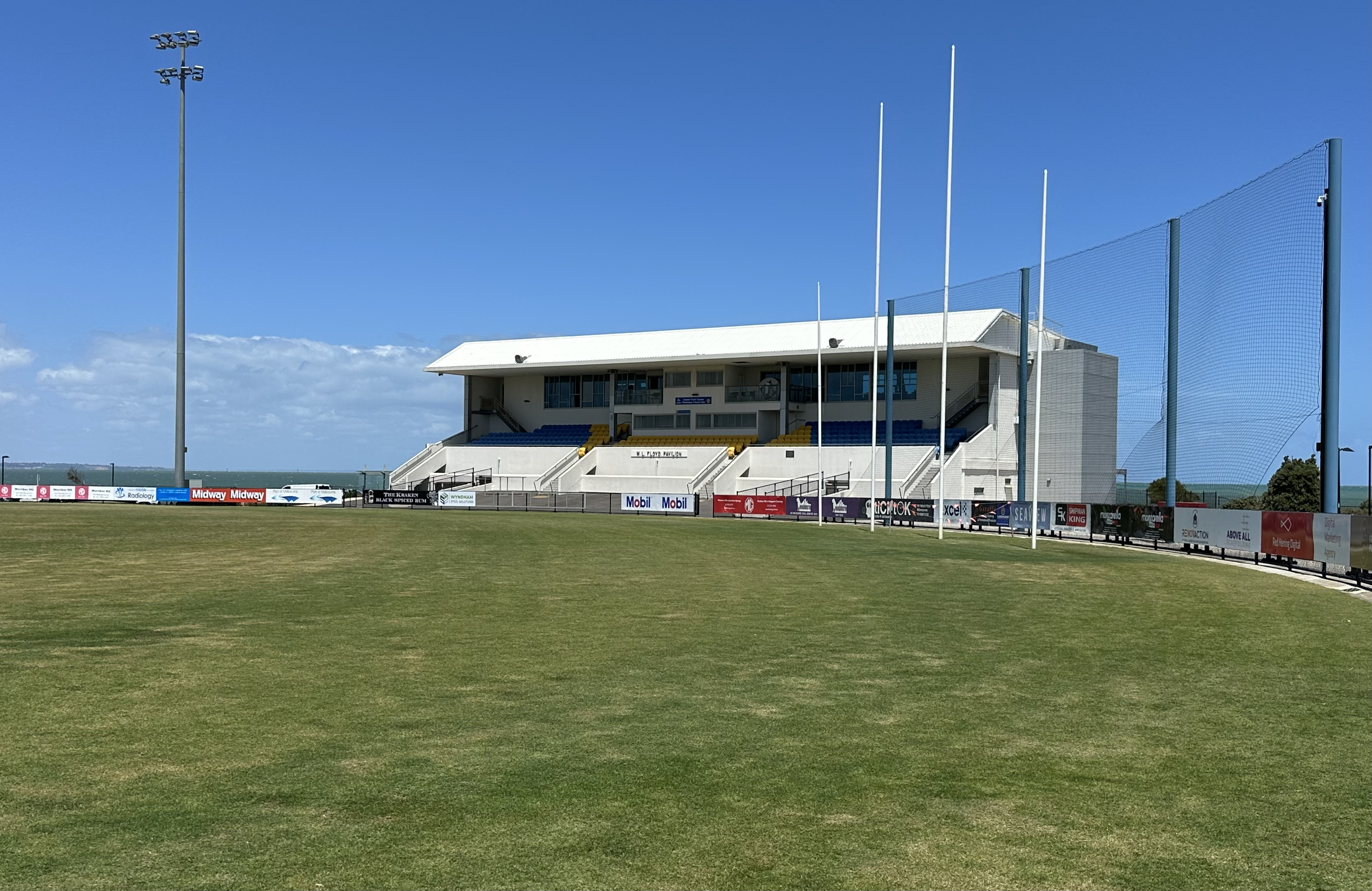
- The WL Floyd Pavilion in January 2026
- Interactive map of Williamstown Cricket Ground
- Former names: Burbank Oval (2003–2019); Downer Oval (2019–2021)
- Location: Williamstown, Victoria
- Coordinates: 37°52′16″S 144°54′12″E
- Owner: City of Hobsons Bay
- Capacity: 6,000 (500 seated)
- Field size: 178 metres × 137 metres

Tenants
- Williamstown Football Club (VFL); Williamstown Cricket Club (VSDCA)

The Williamstown Cricket Ground (WCG), also known under naming rights as DSV Stadium and informally as Point Gellibrand Oval, is an Australian rules football and cricket venue located in the Melbourne suburb of Williamstown. The ground is located on Point Gellibrand, the southernmost point of Williamstown which extends into Port Phillip Bay.

As of 2026, the ground is the home of the Williamstown Football Club in the Victorian Football League (VFL) and the Williamstown Cricket Club in the Victorian Sub-District Cricket Association (VSDCA).

== History ==
The ground was established as early as the 1850s as a venue for cricket in Williamstown.

Senior football was not played regularly at the Williamstown Cricket Ground until 1886. The Williamstown Football Club was unable to agree to terms with the Williamstown Cricket Club for use of the ground, forcing the football club to play its matches without charging for admission at the unfenced Garden's Reserve; as a direct result of this dispute, a new senior football club, the South Williamstown Football Club, was established, and received permission to play its matches at the cricket ground. In 1888, the dispute ended; the two football clubs amalgamated, and the new club began playing all of its home games at the ground with the agreement of the cricket club.

One major grandstand, the WL Floyd Pavilion, was built during the 20th century, and is located on the south-western flank. It was initially opened in 1930, and in 1963 it was named after Larry Floyd, who served as club secretary in the 1930s and 1940s. The ground's location at Point Gellibrand, jutting slightly out into Port Phillip Bay, makes the seaside ground picturesque, but also windswept, often affecting play during football games and making for cold conditions during winter.

The venue was redeveloped between 2010 and 2012, which included refurbishing the Floyd Pavilion. A Crimean War era military bunker was unexpectedly uncovered beneath the outer during the redevelopment work.

On 11 November 2022, the ground was renamed under naming rights to DSV Stadium.
