= Jim 'Frosty' Miller Medal =

Australian rules football award

- League: Victorian Football League
- Awarded for: Most goals in the home-and-away season

History
- Most wins: Nick Sautner (9)
- Most recent: Corey Ellison (Frankston)

The Jim 'Frosty' Miller Medal is an Australian rules football award given annually to the Victorian Football League (VFL) player who kicks the most goals in the home-and-away season. It is named after Dandenong full-forward Jim 'Frosty' Miller, who was the competition's leading goalkicker on six occasions.

Prior to 1999, the leading goalkicker in the VFL – known as the Victorian Football Association (VFA) until the 1996 season – was recognised based on the complete season, including both home-and-away matches and finals. Frankston's Corey Ellison is the most recent recipient of the medal, kicking 52 goals in 2026.

== History ==
In the earliest period of the competition from 1877 to 1888, when teams played games against a mix of senior and junior (Note: At the time, the term "junior" was used to describe open age football of a lower standard than senior football, rather than under age football.) opponents, the leading goalkicker is recognised based on the total number of goals scoared in all VFA matches (not just against senior opponents). The leading goalkicker in senior-only matches was also the leading goalkicker in total matches for seven of the first twelve VFA seasons.

Dave McNamara was the first VFA player to kick more than 100 goals in a season, recording 107 goals in 1912 while playing for Essendon Association. Such a feat was not achieved again until Frank Seymour's 110 goals for Northcote in 1930; after this, a player kicking more than 100 goals in a season was not irregular and occurred 35 times in the VFA/VFL's top division by the end of the 1998 season. The feat has never occurred in the home-and-away season since the introduction of the Frosty Miller Medal, although Aaron Edwards kicked 100 goals (including finals) while playing for Frankston in 2006. Ron Todd's 188 goals in 1945 (including 179 during the home-and-away season) is the most ever kicked in a VFA/VFL season.

Port Melbourne's Fred Cook led the goalkicking after the 1977 and 1978 with 125 goals and 115 goals respectively, although both of these figures are sometimes reported as higher because then-Port Melbourne secretary Norm Goss Sr. had lobbied VFA officials to include NFL Night Series and Centenary Cup matches in players' official career statistics.

Nick Sautner currently holds the record for most medals, with nine.

== Winners ==
=== Jim 'Frosty' Miller Medal (1999–) ===
Frankston's Corey Ellison is the most recent Frosty Miller Medallist, kicking 52 goals in the 2026 season

Brodie McLaughlin (pictured with Box Hill) won the medal with Gold Coast in 2023 and Williamstown in 2025

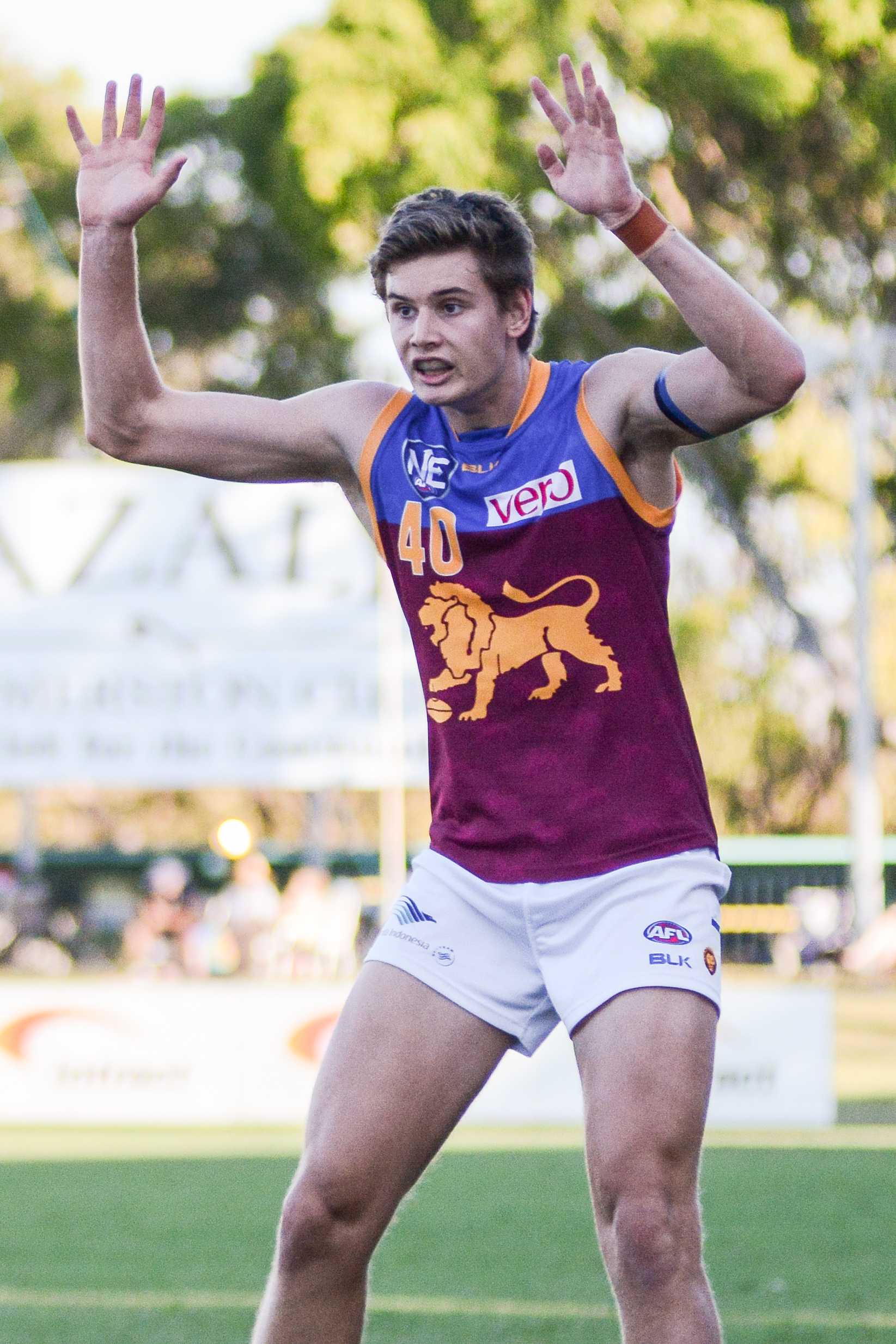
Matthew Hammelmann is the only player from a wooden spoon team to lead the VFA/VFL's goalkicking, with 42 goals for Aspley in the 2021 season

Year	Winner	Team	Goals
1999	Nick Sautner	Sandringham	82
2000	Nick Sautner	Sandringham	60
2001	Nick Sautner	Frankston	73
2002	Nick Sautner	Frankston	93
2003	Nick Sautner	Northern Bullants	82
2004	Nick Sautner	Sandringham	60
2005	James Podsiadly	Werribee	66
2006	Aaron Edwards	Frankston	88
2007	Nick Sautner	Sandringham	59
2008	Nick Sautner	Sandringham	74
2009	Nick Sautner	Sandringham	71
2010	Matthew Little	Williamstown	80
2011	Patrick Rose	Port Melbourne	67
2012	Dean Galea	Port Melbourne	65
2013	Dean Galea	Port Melbourne	55
2014	Daniel Connors	Port Melbourne	38
2014	Sam Grimley	Box Hill	38
2015	Sam Grimley	Box Hill	42
2015	Jordan Lisle	Port Melbourne	42
2015	Liam McBean	Richmond reserves	42
2016	Ahmed Saad	Coburg	49
2017	Jordan Lisle	Port Melbourne	46
2018	Nick Larkey	North Melbourne reserves	41
2019	Jordan Lisle	Port Melbourne	40
2021	Matthew Hammelmann	Aspley	42
2022	Chris Burgess	Gold Coast reserves	52
2023	Chris Burgess	Gold Coast reserves	51
2023	Brodie McLaughlin	Gold Coast reserves	51
2024	Billy Gowers	Port Melbourne	50
2025	Brodie McLaughlin	Williamstown	67
2026	Corey Ellison	Frankston	52

=== Leading goalkickers (1877–1998) ===
This table lists the players recognised as VFA/VFL leading goalkicker prior to the establishment of the Frosty Miller Medal. Over this period, the leading goalkicker was recognised based on the complete season including finals matches (unlike the Frosty Miller Medal which considers home-and-away goals only). For the earliest period of the competition when there were no finals and teams played games against a mix of senior and junior opponents, the list below includes goals scored in all Victorian Football Association games (not just games against senior opponents).

Year	Winner	Team	Goals
1998	Shayne Smith	Springvale	78
1997	Shayne Smith	Springvale	107
1996	Jack Aziz	Werribee	74
1995	Danny Sexton	Port Melbourne	64
1994	Rino Pretto	Dandenong	87
1993	Jack Aziz	Werribee	97
1992	Ian Rickman	Williamstown	82
1991	Rohan Welsh	Dandenong	84
1990	Jamie Shaw	Preston	103
1989	Ian Rickman	Williamstown	125
1988	Jamie Shaw	Preston	105
1987	Brett Weatherald	Coburg	73
1986	Jamie Shaw	Preston	145
1985	Ian Morrison	Sandringham	108
1984	Mark Fotheringham	Williamstown	114
1983	Mark Fotheringham	Williamstown	108
1982	Fred Cook	Port Melbourne	140
1981	Rex Hunt	Sandringham	110
1980	Fred Cook	Port Melbourne	112
1979	Joe Radojevic	Geelong West	97
1979	Kim Smith	Prahran	97
1978	Fred Cook	Port Melbourne	115
1977	Fred Cook	Port Melbourne	125
1976	Fred Cook	Port Melbourne	124
1975	Joe Radojevic	Geelong West	119
1974	Jim 'Frosty' Miller	Dandenong	79
1973	Jim 'Frosty' Miller	Dandenong	108
1972	Len Clark	Preston	107
1971	Jim 'Frosty' Miller	Dandenong	99
1970	Jim 'Frosty' Miller	Dandenong	80
1969	Jim 'Frosty' Miller	Dandenong	106
1968	Jim 'Frosty' Miller	Dandenong	76
1967	John Walker	Preston	83
1966	John Walker	Preston	84
1965	Denis Oakley	Sandringham	78
1964	Alan Cook	Brunswick	65
1963	Robert Evans	Yarraville	47
1962	Bill Bryan	Sandringham	77
1961	Bob Bonnett	Port Melbourne	111
1960	Denis Oakley	Sandringham	90
1959	Denis Oakley	Sandringham	119
1958	Bob Bonnett	Port Melbourne	84
1957	Bob Bonnett	Port Melbourne	97
1956	Bob Bonnett	Port Melbourne	95
1955	Alby Linton	Williamstown	84
1954	Peter Schofield	Moorabbin	96
1953	Johnny Walker	Williamstown	99
1952	Johnny Walker	Williamstown	103
1951	Bruce Harper	Sandringham	104
1950	Bruce Harper	Sandringham	71
1950	Johnny Walker	Williamstown	71
1949	Keith Warburton	Brighton	101
1948	Ray Potter	Preston	84
1947	Bill Findlay	Port Melbourne	107
1946	Ron Todd	Williamstown	114
1945	Ron Todd	Williamstown	188
1941	Bob Pratt	Coburg	183
1940	Ted Freyer	Port Melbourne	157
1939	George Hawkins	Prahran	164
1938	Ted Freyer	Port Melbourne	86
1937	Geoff McInnes	Brunswick	85
1936	Lance Collins	Coburg	116
1935	Bill Luff	Camberwell	75
1934	Frank Seymour	Northcote	130
1933	Bill Luff	Camberwell	106
1932	Frank Seymour	Northcote	122
1931	Don Fraser Sr.	Oakleigh	83
1930	Frank Seymour	Northcote	110
1929	Leo McInerney	Brunswick	84
1928	Frank Plant	Coburg	78
1927	Paddy Gardiner	Coburg	95
1926	Jim Walsh	Brighton	91
1925	Leo McInerney	Brunswick	79
1924	George Gough	Northcote	81
1923	George Taylor	Port Melbourne	65
1922	George Taylor	Port Melbourne	93
1921	George Taylor	Port Melbourne	77
1920	George Taylor	Port Melbourne	73
1919	Harry Morgan	Footscray	72
1918	Thos Stevens	North Melbourne	54
1915	Bob Merrick	Port Melbourne	43
1914	Thornton Clarke	Essendon Association	46
1913	Thornton Clarke	Essendon Association	58
1912	Dave McNamara	Essendon Association	107
1911	Dave McNamara	Essendon Association	81
1910	Frank Caine	North Melbourne	75
1909	Henry Chase	Brunswick	39
1908	Jack Hutchinson	Footscray	68
1907	Jack Hutchinson	Richmond	67
1906	Jack Hutchinson	Richmond	56
1905	Len Mortimer	Williamstown	46
1904	Bert Ryan	West Melbourne	43
1903	Bert Ryan	West Melbourne	44
1902	Jack Hutchinson	Port Melbourne	46
1901	Jack Hutchinson	Port Melbourne	26
1900	Lou Daly	Footscray	32
1899	Lou Daly	Footscray	39
1898	Joe Sullivan	Port Melbourne	26
1897	Lou Daly	Port Melbourne	41
1896	Norman Waugh	Essendon	29
1895	Dave de Coite	Geelong	42
1894	Albert Thurgood	Essendon	63
1893	Albert Thurgood	Essendon	63
1892	Albert Thurgood	Essendon	56
1891	Jim Grace	Fitzroy	49
1890	Jim Grace	Fitzroy	37
1889	Edgar Barrett	South Melbourne	29
1888	Dinny McKay	South Melbourne	50
1887	Tom McShane	Geelong	24
1886	Phil McShane	Geelong	51
1885	Dick Houston	Hotham	35
1884	Phil McShane	Geelong	33
1883	Phil McShane	Geelong	24
1882	Hugh McLean	Geelong	25
1881	E. M. Brookes	Carlton	20
1880	George Coulthard	Carlton	21
1879	George Coulthard	Carlton	21
1878	George Coulthard	Carlton	18
1877	Charles Baker	Melbourne	14

=== Division 2 leading goalkickers (1961–1988) ===
The following table shows the leading senior goalkicker in the VFA's second division (including finals), while it existed from 1961 until 1988.

Year	Winner	Team	Goals
1961	Ron O'Neill	Camberwell	95
1962	Ron O'Neill	Camberwell	59
1963	Frank Power	Mordialloc	74
1964	Ron O'Neill	Camberwell	77
1965	John Walker	Preston	116
1966	Ben Nusteling	Geelong West	92
1967	Frank Power	Mordialloc	84
1968	Eddie Szyszka	Williamstown	61
1969	George Allen	Sunshine	99
1970	George Allen	Sunshine	80
1971	Greg Barnett	Box Hill	69
1972	Graeme McLean	Geelong West	137
1973	Doug Baird	Brunswick	94
1974	Peter V. Smith	Coburg	121
1975	Garry Hammond	Camberwell	112
1976	Peter Neville	Mordialloc	134
1977	Garry Hammond	Camberwell	129
1978	Mark Fotheringham	Yarraville	105
1979	Peter Neville	Mordialloc	132
1980	Paul Angelis	Waverley	100
1981	Peter Stevenson	Camberwell	119
1982	Ted Carroll	Springvale	118
1983	Peter Neville	Mordialloc	135
1984	Dale Carroll	Box Hill	110
1985	Rino Pretto	Oakleigh	170
1986	Rino Pretto	Oakleigh	151
1987	Rino Pretto	Oakleigh	96
1988	Rino Pretto	Oakleigh	91
