= 1979 VFA season =

- Teams: 20

Division 1
- Teams: 10
- Premiers: Coburg (4th premiership)
- Minor premiers: Geelong West (2nd minor premiership)

Division 2
- Teams: 10
- Premiers: Camberwell (1st D2 premiership)
- Minor premiers: Camberwell (1st D2 minor premiership)

The 1979 VFA season was the 98th season of the top division of the Victorian Football Association (VFA), an Australian rules football competition based in the state of Victoria, and the 19th season of the VFA's second division.

The Division 1 premiership was won by the Coburg Football Club, after it defeated Geelong West in the grand final on 23 September by eight points; it was Coburg's fourth Division 1 premiership, and its first since 1928, ending a 51-year Division 1 premiership drought. The Division 2 premiership was won by Camberwell; it was the first premiership in either division ever won by the club since its admission to the Association in 1926, 53 years earlier.

== Division 1 ==
The Division 1 home-and-away season was played over 18 rounds; the top four then contested the finals under the Page–McIntyre system. The finals were played at the Junction Oval.

=== Ladder ===
1979 VFA Division 1 Ladder
Pos	Team	Pld	W	L	D	PF	PA	PP	Pts
1	Geelong West	18	15	3	0	2397	1908	125.6	60
2	Coburg (P)	18	12	6	0	2157	1915	112.6	48
3	Prahran	18	10	8	0	2225	2130	104.5	40
4	Port Melbourne	18	10	8	0	2063	2119	97.4	40
5	Caulfield	18	9	9	0	2007	2266	88.6	36
6	Dandenong	18	8	10	0	2187	1983	110.3	32
7	Preston	18	8	10	0	2343	2238	104.7	32
8	Sandringham	18	8	10	0	2104	2167	97.1	32
9	Frankston	18	6	12	0	2202	2625	83.9	24
10	Brunswick	18	4	14	0	1919	2253	85.2	16

Rules for classification: 1) points; 2) percentage; 3) number of points for.
(P) Premiers

=== Finals ===
	Semi-finals
Sunday, 2 September	Prahran 13.11 (89)	def. by	Port Melbourne 14.17 (101)	Junction Oval (crowd: 8,734)
Sunday, 9 September	Geelong West 14.12 (96)	def. by	Coburg 16.21 (117)	Junction Oval (crowd: 5,786)

	Preliminary Final
Sunday, 16 September	Geelong West 16.11 (107)	def.	Port Melbourne 11.11 (77)	Junction Oval (crowd: 10,566)

1979 VFA Division 1 Grand Final
Sunday, 23 September	Coburg	def.	Geelong West	Junction Oval (crowd: 17,947)
1.6 (12); 5.8 (38); 13.13 (91); 16.15 (111)	Q1; Q2; Q3; Final	5.8 (38); 8.9 (57); 11.11 (77); 14.19 (103)	Umpires: Maurie Stabb
Halbert 3, Smith 3, Cleary 2, Dohnt 2, Halsall 2, Beattie, Fisher, Hartigan, Milroy	Goals	Radojevic 4, Gilmore 3, Lunn 2, S. Wells 2, Arklay, Scarlet, G. Wells

=== Awards ===
- The leading goalkicker for the home-and-away season was Renato Serafini (Frankston), who kicked 95 goals and did not participate in finals. Across the entire season including finals, the joint-leading goalkickers were Kim Smith (Prahran) and Joe Radojevic (Geelong West), who each finished with 97 goals; in the home-and-away season, Smith finished second with 94 goals, and Radojevic finished third with 81 goals.
- The J. J. Liston Trophy was won by Vic Aanensen (Port Melbourne), who polled 38 votes. Aanenson finished ahead of Laurie Burt (Coburg), who was second with 28 votes, and Herman van de Beek (Dandenong), who polled 22 votes.
- Sandringham won the seconds premiership. Sandringham 12.17 (89) defeated Preston 10.10 (70) in the Grand Final, played as a stand-alone match on Saturday 15 September at Toorak Park.
- Sandringham won the last ever lightning premiership. Sandringham 3.5 (23) defeated Yarraville 2.5 (17) in the Grand Final, played as a curtain-raiser to the senior Grand Final on Sunday 23 September.

== Division 2 ==
The Division 2 home-and-away season was played over eighteen rounds; the top four then contested the finals under the Page–McIntyre system; all finals were played on Sundays at Toorak Park.

=== Ladder ===
1979 VFA Division 2 Ladder
Pos	Team	Pld	W	L	D	PF	PA	PP	Pts
1	Camberwell (P)	18	14	4	0	2487	1698	146.5	56
2	Oakleigh	18	14	4	0	2486	1837	135.3	56
3	Mordialloc	18	12	6	0	2399	1796	133.6	48
4	Williamstown	18	12	6	0	2278	1888	120.7	48
5	Northcote	18	12	6	0	2208	2020	109.3	48
6	Yarraville	18	11	7	0	2219	1848	120.1	44
7	Waverley	18	6	12	0	2147	2356	91.1	24
8	Sunshine	18	4	14	0	1718	2415	71.1	16
9	Box Hill	18	3	15	0	1673	2710	61.7	12
10	Werribee	18	2	16	0	1683	2730	61.6	8

Rules for classification: 1) points; 2) percentage; 3) number of points for.
(P) Premiers

=== Finals ===
	Semi-finals
Sunday, 19 August	Mordialloc 14.12 (96)	def.	Williamstown 3.10 (28)	Toorak Park (crowd: 3,000)
Sunday, 26 August	Camberwell 16.13 (109)	def. by	Oakleigh 17.15 (117)	Toorak Park (crowd: 6,500)

	Preliminary Final
Sunday, 2 September	Camberwell 19.14 (128)	def.	Mordialloc 14.11 (95)	Toorak Park (crowd: 3,750)

1979 VFA Division 2 Grand Final
Sunday, 9 September	Oakleigh	def. by	Camberwell	Toorak Park (crowd: 12,023)
2.2 (14); 4.5 (29); 6.7 (43); 12.11 (83)	Q1; Q2; Q3; Final	6.5 (41); 12.7 (79); 15.10 (100); 18.13 (121)	Umpires: P. Snooks
Lennie 4, Wood 4, Thomas 2, Fryer, Leishman	Goals	Cowley 6, Hammond 3, Simpson 3, Moore 2, Alexeeff, Chamberlain, Cook, Hirst

=== Awards ===
- The leading goalkicker for the Division 2 home-and-away season was Mark Fotheringham (Yarraville) who kicked 129 goals and did not participate in finals. The leading goalkicker across the whole season including finals was Peter Neville (Mordialloc), who was second behind Fotheringham with 125 goals in the home-and-away season, and kicked 132 goals overall.
- The J. Field Medal was won by a comfortable margin by Jeff Edwards (Northcote), who polled 58 votes. Edwards polled more than double the votes of David Wenn (Oakleigh), who was second with 26 votes; Peter Kerr (Williamstown) and Kevin Sait (Yarraville), were equal-third with 23 votes each.
- Yarraville won the seconds premiership. Yarraville 17.16 (118) defeated Oakleigh 9.23 (77) in the Grand Final, played as a stand-alone match on Saturday, 8 September.

== Notable events ==
=== NFL Night Series ===
The top two Association clubs from 1977 – Prahran and Preston – were invited to participate in the NFL Night Series, known this year as the Escort Cup. Neither club progressed to the night portion of the series, both eliminated in the first round by their SANFL opponents in a double-header played at Preston City Oval on Anzac Day:

- Prahran lost to Port Adelaide by 45 points
- Preston lost to Central District by eight points

It was the final NFL Night series, as it was entirely superseded by the rival AFC Night Series in 1980, in which the Association clubs were not invited to compete.

=== Interleague matches ===
The Association played an interleague representative match against Queensland for the third consecutive season; it was the Association's first home representative match on an Association ground since 1965. The team was coached by Mick Erwin (Prahran).

After having lost away matches against Queensland in both 1977 and 1978, the Association won this year's match easily. Queensland did not register its first score until the second quarter, by which stage the Association had already scored 9.13 (67), and the final margin was 154 points.

	1979 Interleague Matches
Sunday, 17 June	V.F.A. 28.26 (192)	def.	Queensland 5.8 (38)	Toorak Park (crowd: 2,500)

=== Other notable events ===
- On 3 June, Prahran won its first game against Port Melbourne at North Port Oval since 1951, a streak lasting 28 years (in 21 of which the two clubs competed in the same division).
- On 24 June, Frankston 26.19 (175) defeated Preston 25.18 (168) in an extremely high scoring game.
- On 4 July, Preston was found guilty of having fielded an unregistered player, Greg Marshall, in matches early in the season; Marshall's Form 3A had not been completed when he played in two senior matches and three seconds matches at the start of the season. The two senior matches in which Marshall had illegally played were an eight-point win against Caulfield and a draw against Port Melbourne; as a result of the revelations, the win and four points from each match were awarded to Preston's opponent. The penalty saw Port Melbourne reach the finals at Preston's expense: had the original results stood, ceteris paribus, Preston and Port Melbourne would have finished fourth and fifth respectively with 38 points each, Preston having the higher percentage. Preston was also fined $1150, comprising $500 for each senior match and $50 for seconds match in which Marshall played. It was the first case of points being stripped for playing an unregistered player since 1952.
- In July, the Association had discussions with the Bendigo Football League with the view to offering stalwart clubs Golden Square and Sandhurst admission, but the offer was rejected.
- In the final round of Division 2 home-and-away matches, Sunshine back-pocket Denis Strybosch was reported for the unusual misconduct charge of indecently exposing himself to an umpire. The incident occurred late in the final quarter of Sunshine's 119-point loss to Yarraville: dominant Yarraville full-forward Mark Fotheringham was lining up for goal from the behind post with Strybosch on the mark when Sunshine full-back Peter Simpson walked across the mark; umpire Bill Torney paid a 15-metre penalty, to which Strybosch turned around, lowered his shorts and mooned Torney; Strybosch was reported by all four umpires at that end of the ground, and was immediately benched by his coach. At his hearing on 14 August, Strybosch claimed the gesture was a tactic to distract Fotheringham; but he also criticised Torney's umpiring and Fotheringham's play, none of which particularly helped his case. Strybosch was suspended for ten weeks. Later in the evening of Strybosch's hearing, his Sunshine team-mate Brian Morley, who had been cleared of his own misconduct charge earlier in the night and had allegedly been drinking in the hours since, abused and threatened Torney as he left VFA House. Morley returned to face the honorary commission on August 28, and was initially suspended for the entire 1980 season; but this was increased to a life suspension after he threw an ashtray at the chairman of the honorary commission.

== See also ==
- List of VFA/VFL premiers
