= 1986 VFA season =

105th season of the Victorian Football Association

- Date: 13 April – 21 September 1986
- Teams: 22

Division 1
- Teams: 10
- Premiers: Williamstown; 11th D1 premiership
- Runners-up: Coburg; 7th D1 runners-up result
- Minor premiers: Coburg; 6th D1 minor premiership
- Relegated: Camberwell

Division 2
- Teams: 12
- Premiers: Box Hill; 2nd D2 premiership
- Runners-up: Sunshine; 3rd D2 runners-up result
- Minor premiers: Sunshine; 3rd D2 minor premiership

Attendance
- Matches played: 206 (D1: 94; D2: 112)

The 1986 VFA season was the 105th season of the top division of the Victorian Football Association (VFA), and the 26th season of second division competition.

The Division 1 premiership was won by the Williamstown Football Club, after it defeated Coburg in the Grand Final on 21 September by 13 points; it was Williamstown's eleventh Division 1 premiership, and its first since 1959. The Division 2 premiership was won by Box Hill; it was the club's second Division 2 premiership in three years, having competed in and been relegated from Division 1 in the intervening year.

== Division 1 ==
The Division 1 home-and-away season was played over eighteen rounds; the top four then contested the finals under the Page–McIntyre system. The finals were played at the Junction Oval.

=== Ladder ===
1986 VFA Division 1 Ladder
Pos	Team	Pld	W	L	D	PF	PA	PP	Pts
1	Coburg	18	15	3	0	2560	1658	154.4	60
2	Frankston	18	13	5	0	2203	1899	116.0	52
3	Williamstown (P)	18	12	6	0	2540	1718	147.8	48
4	Preston	18	12	6	0	2222	1647	134.9	48
5	Port Melbourne	18	10	8	0	2384	2106	113.2	40
6	Sandringham	18	10	8	0	2246	2015	111.5	40
7	Geelong West	18	7	11	0	1922	1870	102.8	28
8	Brunswick	18	7	11	0	1989	2215	89.8	28
9	Springvale	18	4	14	0	1835	2245	81.7	16
10	Camberwell	18	0	18	0	1091	3619	30.1	0

Rules for classification: 1) points; 2) percentage; 3) number of points for.
(P) Premiers

=== Finals ===
	Semi-finals
Sunday, 31 August (2:10pm)	Williamstown 19.10 (124)	def.	Preston 18.6 (114)	Junction Oval (crowd: 6,600)
Sunday, 7 September (2:10pm)	Coburg 25.19 (169)	def.	Frankston 17.5 (107)	Junction Oval (crowd: 4,500)

	Preliminary Final
Sunday, 14 September (2:10pm)	Frankston 12.17 (89)	def. by	Williamstown 19.19 (133)	Junction Oval (crowd: 8,000)

1986 VFA Division 1 Grand Final
Sunday, 21 September (2:10pm)	Coburg	def. by	Williamstown	Junction Oval (crowd: 20,146)
1.3 (9); 5.6 (36); 6.9 (45); 14.14 (98)	Q1; Q2; Q3; Final	2.3 (15); 6.4 (40); 14.6 (90); 17.9 (111)	Umpires: Graeme Marcy, Jeff Ryan; Norm Goss Memorial Medal: Tony Pastore (Williamstown)
Laidler 5, M. Harbinson 2, Allison, Christensen, Collins, Gumley, Ingram, Sheldon, Taranto	Goals	Fotheringham 5, Cahill 4, Smith 3, Simmons 2, Owen, Round, Sait
Cleary, for unduly rough play in the third quarter (ordered off); Allison, for striking Wheeler in the final quarter Gumley, for striking Sait in the final quarter Sheldon, for striking Morrison in the final quarter	Reports	Smith, for striking Laidler in the first quarter Owen, for striking Sheldon in the second quarter

=== Awards ===
- The leading goalkicker for the season was Jamie Shaw (Preston), who kicked 135 goals during the home-and-away season, and 145 goals overall.
- The J. J. Liston Trophy was won by Tony West (Brunswick), who polled 18 votes. West finished ahead of Jeff Sarau (Frankston), who polled 15 votes, and Brett Chadband (Port Melbourne) and Jamie Shaw (Preston), who each polled 13 votes.
- Williamstown won the seconds premiership. Williamstown 20.16 (136) defeated Preston 18.15 (123) in the Grand Final, held on Sunday 21 September.
- Williamstown also won the thirds premiership, giving it premierships in all three grades in the same season.

== Division 2 ==
The Division 2 home-and-away season was played over eighteen rounds; the top four then contested the finals under the Page–McIntyre system. The finals were played at Junction Oval.

=== Ladder ===
1986 VFA Division 2 Ladder
Pos	Team	Pld	W	L	D	PF	PA	PP	Pts
1	Sunshine	18	16	2	0	2281	1302	175.2	64
2	Box Hill (P)	18	15	3	0	2543	1302	195.3	60
3	Prahran	18	15	3	0	2402	1427	168.3	60
4	Oakleigh	18	14	4	0	2378	1308	181.8	56
5	Dandenong	18	11	7	0	1718	1417	121.2	44
6	Waverley	18	10	8	0	2077	1639	126.7	40
7	Werribee	18	8	10	0	1640	1695	96.8	32
8	Moorabbin	18	8	10	0	1595	1739	91.7	32
9	Caulfield	18	7	11	0	1860	2191	84.9	28
10	Northcote	18	2	16	0	1466	2605	56.3	8
11	Berwick	18	2	16	0	1330	2595	51.3	8
12	Mordialloc	18	0	18	0	1066	3135	34.0	0

Rules for classification: 1) points; 2) percentage; 3) number of points for.
(P) Premiers

=== Finals ===
	Semi-finals
Sunday, 31 August (11:10am)	Prahran 21.14 (140)	def.	Oakleigh 13.18 (96)	Junction Oval (crowd: 6,600 (C-R))
Sunday, 7 September (11:10am)	Sunshine 9.13 (67)	def. by	Box Hill 14.17 (101)	Junction Oval (crowd: 4,500 (C-R))

	Preliminary Final
Sunday, 14 September (11:10am)	Sunshine 16.16 (112)	def.	Prahran 17.7 (109)	Junction Oval (crowd: 8,000 (C-R))

1986 VFA Division 2 Grand Final
Sunday, 21 September (11:10am)	Box Hill	def.	Sunshine	Junction Oval (crowd: 20,146 (C-R))
4.6 (30); 8.9 (57); 11.11 (77); 14.14 (98)	Q1; Q2; Q3; Final	2.4 (16); 5.7 (37); 9.11 (65); 11.14 (80)	Umpires: Casey, Marshall
L. Bolton 3, Withers 3, Dwyer 2, Brown, Bourke, Garth, Nicholson, O'Shae, Teakel	Goals	Litchfield 4, Shepparbottom 3, Scanlan 2, Brown, Nelson
Reports	Quinn, for striking Nicholson in the first quarter Protetto, for striking Withers in the first quarter Hodges, for striking Witnish in the first quarter Quinn, for striking Nicholson in the second quarter Nelson, for striking Sheridan in the second quarter Wagland, for striking Nicholson in the second quarter Protetto, for striking L. Bolton in the third quarter Protetto, for using abusive language in the third quarter Brown, for striking Garth in the final quarter Mitrovski, for striking Dwyer in the final quarter

=== Awards ===
- The leading goalkicker for Division 2 was Rino Pretto (Oakleigh), who kicked 146 goals in the home-and-away season, and 151 goals overall.
- The J. Field Medal was won by Darren Hall (Dandenong) for the second consecutive year. Hall polled 30 votes to finish ahead of Pepe Protetto (Sunshine), who polled 25 votes, and Chris Rourke (Oakleigh), who polled 23 votes.
- Dandenong won the seconds premiership. Dandenong 14.19 (103) defeated Waverley 9.8 (62) in the Grand Final, played as a curtain-raiser to the Division 1 Seconds Grand Final on 21 September.

== Notable events ==
=== Interleague matches ===
The Association played one interleague match during the season, against the Victorian Amateur Football Association. Phil Cleary (Coburg) took over from Gary Brice as coach.

	1986 Interleague Matches
Sunday, 8 June	V.A.F.A. 10.8 (68)	def. by	V.F.A. 14.13 (97)	Elsternwick Park

=== Other notable events ===
- In the thirds competition, the second division was re-established from the 1986 season. The Thirds had played as a single division for the previous two seasons, after the second division was abandoned at the start of 1984.
- In its first home game, at which its 1985 Division 2 flag was unfurled, Brunswick led Williamstown by fifty points late in the third quarter, before Williamstown staged a comeback to win by two points; Williamstown 20.12 (132) d. Brunswick 20.10 (130).
- During the season, Brunswick recruited former VFL and WAFL player Mark 'Jacko' Jackson, a strong full forward better known for his larrikinism and on-field antics. Jackson's celebrity status was a drawcard for Brunswick; his first match for the club on 18 May drew a crowd of more than 10,000 to Gillon Oval, and helped the club secure $50,000 in sponsorships. Jackson was sacked by the club in mid-July after missing training.
- On Saturday 19 July, the Association attempted an innovation by staging two matches as a double-header at the Melbourne Cricket Ground. It was the first time an Association game had been played at the venue since the 1961 Anzac Day game, and it was the first time an Association match had been played on Saturday for more than a decade. The Association needed a crowd of 15,000 to break even on the venture, and hoped to achieve it with three of the clubs who were then in the top four on display, and with only two VFL matches scheduled for the day due to a split-round; but the crowd was a disappointing 6,253, resulting a large financial loss. In the two games, Sandringham 26.8 (164) d. Brunswick 19.13 (127), and Coburg 20.20 (140) d. Frankston 18.13 (121).
- On 3 August, Mordialloc player Graeme Pelikan, playing his first senior game, was suspended for life for striking field umpire Greg Hutchinson. Hutchinson had reported Pelikan for striking two Caulfield opponents in a melee – for each of which Pelikan was suspended for four weeks – and in retaliation Pelikan punched Hutchinson in the side of the head, concussing him.
- On 10 August, Williamstown set new records for the highest score and greatest winning margin in Association history, when it defeated Camberwell by the score of Williamstown 55.17 (347) d. Camberwell 4.8 (32). Both records still stand as of 2024.
- Three separate players scored hauls of twenty or more goals in matches during the 1986 season:
  - On 20 April, Rino Pretto (Oakleigh) scored twenty goals against Mordialloc – despite feeling so ill that he collapsed after the game and spent the following week in hospital with a diabetic condition.
  - On 27 July, Hugh Litchfield (Sunshine) scored twenty goals against Mordialloc.
  - On 10 August, Andrew Gibson (Williamstown) scored twenty-two goals against Camberwell.
- Network Ten expanded its coverage of Association games to include one match in each of the last four rounds of the home-and-away season (instead of two rounds, as had been the case in previous years), plus all of the finals.

== See also ==
- List of VFA/VFL premiers
