= 1976 VFA season =

Division 1
- Teams: 10
- Premiers: Port Melbourne; 11th D1 premiership
- Minor premiers: Port Melbourne; 10th D1 minor premiership
- Relegated: Oakleigh

Division 2
- Teams: 10
- Premiers: Williamstown; 2nd D2 premiership
- Minor premiers: Frankston; 1st D2 minor premiership

The 1976 Victorian Football Association season was the 95th season of the top division of the Australian rules football competition, and the 16th season of second division competition. The Division 1 premiership was won by the Port Melbourne Football Club, after it defeated Dandenong in the Grand Final on 19 September by 57 points; it was Port Melbourne's 11th Division 1 premiership, taking it past Williamstown to become the club with the most Division 1 premierships in VFA history, a title it still holds outright as of 2024; and, it was the second of six premierships won by the club in nine seasons between 1974 and 1982. The Division 2 premiership was won by Williamstown; it was its second Division 2 premiership, won in its first season in after relegation.

== Division 1 ==
The Division 1 home-and-away season was played over 18 rounds; the top four then contested the finals under the Page–McIntyre system. The finals were played at the St Kilda Cricket Ground.

=== Ladder ===
1976 VFA Division 1 Ladder
Pos	Team	Pld	W	L	D	PF	PA	PP	Pts
1	Port Melbourne (P)	18	15	3	0	2288	1883	121.5	60
2	Preston	18	13	5	0	2164	1920	112.7	52
3	Caulfield	18	11	7	0	2095	1978	105.9	44
4	Dandenong	18	10	8	0	1966	1781	110.4	40
5	Coburg	18	9	9	0	2052	1940	105.8	36
6	Geelong West	18	9	9	0	1960	2079	94.3	36
7	Prahran	18	8	10	0	1847	2019	91.5	32
8	Brunswick	18	5	12	1	1836	2105	87.2	22
9	Sandringham	18	5	13	0	1982	2068	95.8	20
10	Oakleigh	18	4	13	1	1639	2056	79.7	18

Rules for classification: 1) points; 2) percentage; 3) number of points for.
(P) Premiers

=== Finals ===
	Semi-finals
Sunday, 29 August	Caulfield 15.9 (99)	def. by	Dandenong 20.19 (139)	St Kilda Cricket Ground (crowd: 11,352)
Sunday, 5 September	Port Melbourne 19.18 (132)	def.	Preston 14.9 (93)	St Kilda Cricket Ground (crowd: 11,578)

	Preliminary Final
Sunday, 12 September	Preston 11.8 (74)	def. by	Dandenong 20.16 (136)	St Kilda Cricket Ground (crowd: 10,828)

=== Grand Final ===
The 1976 Division 1 Grand Final became infamous for violent clashes and brawls during the second quarter. Early in the second quarter Port Melbourne full-forward Fred Cook was king-hit more than 70m behind the play, sparking a brawl in Port Melbourne's forward-line; as this was in progress, Dandenong half-forward flanker Pat Flaherty was felled at the other end of the field, sparking further brawling. The brawl delayed the restart of play for ten minutes. Then, at the 16-minute mark of the same quarter, Port Melbourne captain-coach Norm Brown was king hit by Alan Harper, sparking further brawling.

In all, nine players and officials were reported during the second quarter brawls. Dandenong secretary Lionel Farrow described the game as being worse than the controversial 1967 Grand Final played between the same clubs nine years earlier. Cook required twenty-three stitches in his mouth as a result of his injuries, but recovered and kicked 5.6 for the game. Brown suffered a broken nose and lost teeth, and Dandenong's Alan Harper suffered a broken jaw. At the time of the first brawl, Port Melbourne already held a large lead, and nothing changed on the scoreboard after the brawls; the rest of the game passed without incident, and Port Melbourne won the game comfortably.

1976 VFA Division 1 Grand Final
Sunday, 19 September	Port Melbourne	def.	Dandenong	St Kilda Cricket Ground (crowd: 32,137)
8.5 (53); 12.10 (82); 13.14 (92); 19.18 (132)	Q1; Q2; Q3; Final	3.2 (20); 5.6 (36); 8.11 (59); 10.15 (75)	Umpires: Graeme Marcy
Cook 5, Rasmussen 4, Bond 2, Christou 2, Holt 2, Kerr 2, Brown, Haenen	Goals	Flaherty 3, Briese 2, Taylor 2, Hibbert, Payze, Wright
Cook (lacerated mouth), Brown (broken nose, lost teeth)	Injuries	Miller (broken foot), Crane (groin), Harper (broken jaw)
Haenen, for striking boundary umpire Walker (cleared); Harland, for striking Harper (four weeks); Dermott, for kneeing Harper (reprimand); Holt, for striking Droscher (two weeks); Allen, for striking Thompson (two weeks); Thomas (trainer), for grabbing Harper by the hair (entire 1977 season)	Reports	Droscher, for striking Holt (two weeks); Shinners, for striking Thomas (trainer) (four weeks); Melai (trainer), for using abusive language (six weeks)
All reports took place in the second quarter; the suspensions and penalties received are indicated in parentheses.

=== Awards ===
- The leading goalkicker for the season was Fred Cook (Port Melbourne), who kicked 115 goals in the home-and-away season and 124 goals overall.
- The J. J. Liston Trophy was won by Danny Hibbert (Dandenong), who polled 34 votes. Hibbert finished ahead of Derek King (Oakleigh), who finished second with 33 votes, and Ken Marks (Preston), who finished third with 30 votes.
- Coburg won the seconds premiership; it was the third consecutive season that Coburg had won the seconds premiership, with the first of those coming in Division 2. Coburg 16.16 (112) defeated Port Melbourne 8.19 (67) in the Grand Final, played as a stand-alone match on Saturday 11 September at Toorak Park.
- Coburg won the lightning premiership. Coburg 5.7 (37) defeated Brunswick 1.7 (13) in the Grand Final, played as a curtain-raiser to the senior Grand Final on Sunday 19 September.

== Division 2 ==
The Division 2 home-and-away season was played over eighteen rounds; the top four then contested the finals under the Page–McIntyre system; all finals were played on Sundays at Toorak Park.

=== Ladder ===
1976 VFA Division 2 Ladder
Pos	Team	Pld	W	L	D	PF	PA	PP	Pts
1	Frankston	18	16	1	1	2392	1668	143.4	66
2	Mordialloc	18	14	4	0	2623	1728	151.8	56
3	Williamstown (P)	18	12	6	0	2374	1901	124.9	48
4	Northcote	18	11	6	1	2225	1800	123.6	46
5	Camberwell	18	10	8	0	2262	2124	106.5	40
6	Werribee	18	7	11	0	1995	2138	93.3	28
7	Sunshine	18	6	12	0	1909	2161	88.3	24
8	Waverley	18	6	12	0	1895	2199	86.2	24
9	Box Hill	18	6	12	0	1835	2392	76.7	24
10	Yarraville	18	1	17	0	1557	2955	52.7	4

Rules for classification: 1) points; 2) percentage; 3) number of points for.
(P) Premiers

=== Finals ===
	Semi-finals
Sunday, 15 August	Williamstown 16.20 (116)	def.	Northcote 17.10 (112)	Toorak Park (crowd: 9,500)
Sunday, 22 August	Frankston 13.14 (92)	def. by	Mordialloc 17.17 (119)	Toorak Park (crowd: 11,000)

	Preliminary Final
Sunday, 29 August	Frankston 17.16 (118)	def. by	Williamstown 18.12 (120)	Toorak Park (crowd: 8,000)

1976 VFA Division 2 Grand Final
Sunday, 5 September	Mordialloc	def. by	Williamstown	Toorak Park (crowd: 10,000)
3.4 (22); 4.10 (34); 8.12 (60); 9.16 (70)	Q1; Q2; Q3; Final	2.1 (13); 8.2 (50); 13.5 (83); 19.13 (127)	Umpires: Graeme Marcy
Johnston 3, Norris 2, Williamson 2, Deaton, Neville	Goals	Boxall 7, Mildenhall 3, Cross 2, Gardiner 2, Mahoney 2, Brown, Harley, Tweedley

=== Awards ===
- The leading goalkicker for Division 2 was Peter Neville (Mordialloc) who kicked 129 goals in the home-and-away season, and 134 goals overall. Neville won the title in his first full season of senior football, having played a single game for Sandringham in 1975.
- The J. Field Medal was won by Colin Boyd (Williamstown), who polled 34 votes. Boyd finished ahead of Stephen Douglas (Werribee), who finished second with 29 votes, and John Johnston (Mordialloc), who finished third with 26 votes.
- Frankston won the seconds premiership. Frankston 14.23 (107) defeated Camberwell 14.20 (104) in the Grand Final, played as a stand-alone match on Saturday, 4 September at Northcote Park.

== Notable events ==
=== Interleague matches ===
The Association played one interleague representative match during the season, against the Ovens & Murray Football League on Anzac Day. Tony Jewell (Caulfield) coached the Association team.

	1976 Interleague Matches
Sunday, 25 April	O&M 17.14 (116)	def. by	V.F.A. 19.11 (125)	Bunton Park, Albury (crowd: 4,000)

=== Other notable events ===
- In response to the poor reputation for on-field violence that the Association had developed, the Viscount Sportsmanship Award, valued at $1,000, was established to be awarded to the club in each division with the fewest reports and suspensions during the season. Brunswick won the award in Division 1, losing only a single point for the season.
- On 2 May, Camberwell defeated Williamstown for the first time since 19 July 1952, ending a losing streak lasting 16 matches over 24 years.
- On 13 June, Geelong West lost at the Western Oval for the first time since Round 11, 1973, ending a 25-match home winning streak.
- In a bizarre Division 2 match between Northcote and Williamstown, Williamstown scored eleven straight goals before scoring its first behind late in the second quarter, and Northcote scored sixteen straight behinds before scoring its first goal late in the third quarter. The final score was Williamstown 16.4 (100) d. Northcote 6.21 (57).
- In the final round of Division 1 home-and-away matches, Oakleigh trailed Dandenong by 39 points at three-quarter time, before kicking eight goals to one in the final quarter to win by four points. The result was inconsequential, as Oakleigh was already assured of relegation.
- Northcote reached the Division 2 finals for the first time since 1966; over the previous nine years, the club had finished in fifth place to just miss the finals on six occasions.

== See also ==
- List of VFA/VFL Premiers
