= 2007 VFL season =

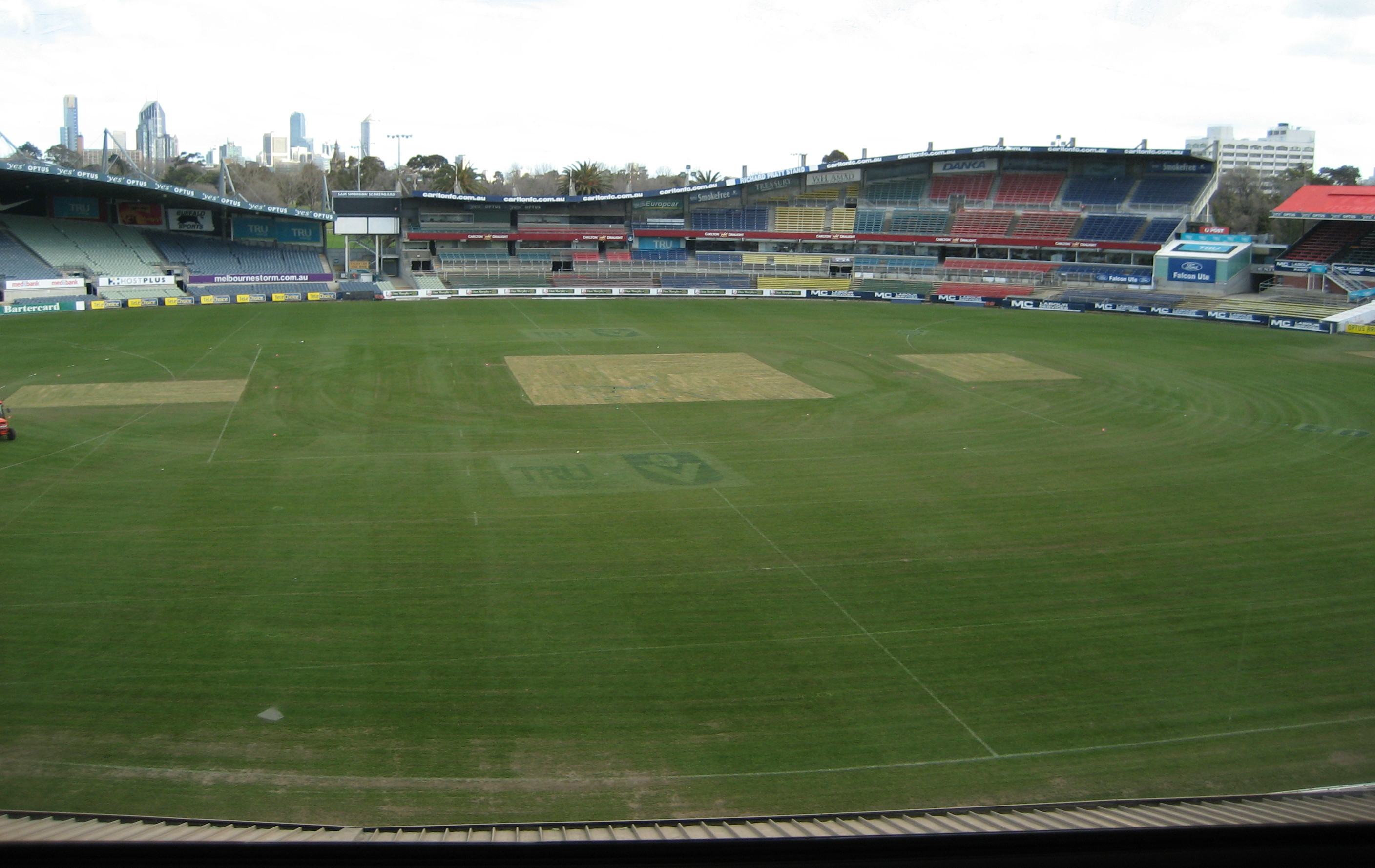
- MC Labour Park during the 2007 VFL season
- Teams: 13
- Premiers: Geelong reserves 2nd premiership
- Runners-up: Coburg; 8th runners-up result
- Minor premiers: Sandringham; 6th minor premiership
- J. J. Liston Trophy: James Byrne (Geelong – 22 votes)
- Frosty Miller Medallist: Nicholas Sautner (Sandringham – 69 goals)
- Matches played: 126

The 2007 VFL season was the 126th season of the Victorian Football League (VFL), a second-tier Australian rules football competition played in the states of Victoria and Tasmania.

== Home-and-away season ==
=== Round 1 ===
	Round 1
Saturday, 7 April (1:10pm)	Sandringham 23.11 (147)	def.	Geelong 20.19 (139)	Trevor Barker Beach Oval
Saturday, 7 April (2:00pm)	Williamstown 17.15 (117)	def.	Werribee 9.10 (64)	Burbank Oval
Saturday, 7 April (2:00pm)	Casey 12.18 (90)	def. by	North Ballarat 20.15 (135)	Casey Fields
Saturday, 7 April (2:00pm)	Bendigo 11.14 (80)	def. by	Tasmania 16.14 (110)	Windy Hill
Sunday, 8 April (2:00pm)	Coburg 12.10 (82)	def. by	Northern Bullants 21.17 (143)	Coburg City Oval
Sunday, 8 April (2:00pm)	Frankston 18.14 (122)	def.	Port Melbourne 13.15 (93)	Frankston Oval
	Bye; Box Hill

== Ladder ==
Pos	Team	Pld	W	L	D	PF	PA	PP	Pts	
1	Sandringham	18	15	3	0	2051	1549	132.4	60	Finals
2	Geelong (P)	18	14	4	0	2139	1449	147.6	56	Finals
3	Coburg	18	13	5	0	1885	1602	117.7	52	Finals
4	Williamstown	18	10	6	2	1848	1543	119.8	44	Finals
5	North Ballarat	18	10	8	0	1793	1907	94.0	40	Finals
6	Casey	18	9	8	1	1755	1677	104.7	38	Finals
7	Port Melbourne	18	8	9	1	1714	1889	90.7	34	Finals
8	Bendigo	18	8	10	0	1834	1703	107.7	32	Finals
9	Northern Bullants	18	8	10	0	1527	1644	92.9	32	
10	Werribee	18	7	11	0	1894	1843	102.8	28	
11	Frankston	18	6	11	1	1509	1739	86.8	26	
12	Box Hill	18	4	13	1	1362	1875	72.6	18	
13	Tasmania	18	2	16	0	1401	2292	61.1	8	

Rules for classification: 1) points; 2) percentage; 3) number of points for.
(P) Premiers

== Finals series ==
Qualifying and elimination finals
1 Sep, Trevor Barker Beach Oval
1	Sandringham	16.15 (111)
4	Williamstown	17.11 (113)
1 Sep, TEAC Oval
5	North Ballarat	21.22 (148)
8	Bendigo	16.15 (111)
2 Sep, Casey Fields
6	Casey	12.17 (89)
7	Port Melbourne	15.12 (102)
2 Sep, TEAC Oval
2	Geelong	22.16 (148)
3	Coburg	17.15 (117)

Semi-finals
8 Sep, TEAC Oval
Sandringham	12.21 (93)
North Ballarat	16.14 (110)
9 Sep, TEAC Oval
Coburg	21.16 (142)
Port Melbourne	10.12 (72)

Preliminary finals
16 Sep, TEAC Oval
Williamstown	11.10 (76)
Coburg	20.17 (137)
15 Sep, TEAC Oval
Geelong	24.14 (158)
North Ballarat	13.18 (96)

Grand final
23 Sep, MC Labour Park
Geelong	17.24 (126)
Coburg	7.10 (52)

=== Grand Final ===
2007 VFL Grand Final
Sunday, 23 September (2:15pm)	Geelong	def.	Coburg	MC Labour Park (crowd: 13,842)
3.5 (23); 5.13 (43); 12.19 (91); 17.24 (126)	Q1; Q2; Q3; Final	1.2 (8); 4.5 (29); 4.6 (30); 7.10 (52)	Norm Goss Memorial Medal: Tom Lonergan (Geelong)
Lonergan 6, Davenport 2, Hawkins 2, Cheep, Djerrkura, Gardiner, Gamble, Grima, Hogan, Varcoe	Goals	Jackson 2, Connors, Gazzo, Hill, Krakouer, Oakley-Nicholls

== Awards ==
- The Jim 'Frosty' Miller Medal was won for the seventh time by Nick Sautner (Sandringham), who kicked 69 goals. Sautner's seventh time as the competition's leading goalkicker broke the record of six set by the medal's namesake, Jim 'Frosty' Miller (Dandenong). Sautner won a further two medals for a career total of nine before his retirement.
- The J. J. Liston Trophy was by James Byrne (Geelong), who polled 22 votes. Byrne finished ahead of Shane Valenti (Sandringham), who was second with 20 votes, and Travis Ronaldson (Coburg), who was third with 17 votes.
- The Fothergill–Round Medal was won by Shane Valenti (Sandringham).
- Coburg won the reserves premiership. Coburg 17.20 (122) defeated Port Melbourne 8.8 (56) in the Grand Final, held as a curtain-raiser to the Seniors Grand Final on 23 September.

=== VFL Team of the Year ===
2007 Victorian Team of the Year
B:	S Rosa (Bendigo)	Chris Lamb (Sandringham)	Jarrod Silvester (Coburg)
HB:	John Baird (Port Melbourne)	Jason Cloke (Bendigo)	Adam Iacobucci (Northern Bullants)
C:	Jason Davenport (Geelong)	James Byrne (Geelong) (Capt.)	David Gallagher (Sandringham)
HF:	Ezra Poyas (Sandringham)	Jeremy Dukes (Port Melbourne)	Peter Summers (Sandringham)
F:	Justin Berry (Frankston)	Nicholas Sautner (Sandringham)	Todd Grima (Geelong)
Foll:	Travis Ronaldson (Coburg)	Alister Neville (Coburg)	Shane Valenti (Sandringham)
Int:	Brett Johnson (Williamstown)	Tristan Cartledge (North Ballarat)	Nick Smith (Box Hill)
Int:	Kyle Matthews (Casey)		

== Notable events ==
- During the final quarter of the Round 7 match between Tasmania and Coburg at Bellerive Oval, Tasmania's Mathew Westfield collided with one of the goal posts, snapping it at its base. The game was delayed for ten minutes while a replacement goal post was installed.
- During the year, Frank Johnson, who played eight seasons for Port Melbourne from 1950 to 1957 and five for South Melbourne from 1960 to 1964, was inducted into the Australian Football Hall of Fame. He was the first player known primarily for his VFA career ever to be inducted into the Hall of Fame (excluding players from prior to the formation of the original VFL in 1897).
- In the elimination final between North Ballarat and Bendigo, Bendigo held a 59-point lead early in the third quarter; North Ballarat then kicked 17 of the next 19 goals to record a 37-point win.

== See also ==
- List of VFA/VFL premiers
- Australian Rules Football
- Victorian Football League
- Australian Football League
- 2007 AFL season
