= 1984 VFA season =

1984 VFA Premiership Season
- Teams: 23

Division 1
- Teams: 12
- Premiers: Preston (4th premiership)
- Minor premiers: Preston (6th minor premiership)

Division 2
- Teams: 11
- Premiers: Box Hill (1st D2 premiership)
- Minor premiers: Box Hill (1st D2 minor premiership)

The 1984 Victorian Football Association season was the 103rd season of the top division of the Australian rules football competition, and the 24th season of second division competition. The Division 1 premiership was won by the Preston Football Club, after it defeated Frankston in the Grand Final on 23 September by 54 points; it was Preston's fourth Division 1 premiership, and its second in a row. The Division 2 premiership was won by Box Hill; it was the club's first premiership in either division since joining the Association in 1951.

== Association membership ==
On 25 January, the Association's board of directors declined to renew Yarraville's membership; this decision was made unilaterally by the board of directors, and did not require a vote of club delegates. The decision followed a review of Yarraville's on-field and off-field position which concluded that the club had no prospects of long-term viability. The club had been in decline since its relegation from Division 1 in 1970, and had almost folded in 1976; it could not attract sufficient fans or sponsors from the Yarraville area, which had a declining population and an increasing ethnic demographic, and consequently struggled to finance a competitive team – in 1983, the club had won one senior game and been winless in both minor grades.

The decision ended Yarraville's 57-year affiliation with the Association, which had yielded two top division premierships (1935 and 1961). The club initially sought to compete in another competition, but ultimately disbanded. Yarraville's departure resulted in Division 2 being reduced to eleven clubs, and the Association as a whole to twenty-three clubs. Yarraville was the first of fifteen clubs to leave the Association during its period of decline between 1984 and 1996.

== Division 1 ==
The Division 1 home-and-away season was played over eighteen rounds; the top four then contested the finals under the Page–McIntyre system. The finals were played at the Junction Oval.

=== Ladder ===
1984 VFA Division 1 Ladder
| Pos | Team | Pld | W | L | D | PF | PA | PP | Pts |
|---|---|---|---|---|---|---|---|---|---|
| 1 | Preston (P) | 18 | 16 | 2 | 0 | 2658 | 1626 | 163.5 | 64 |
| 2 | Geelong West | 18 | 15 | 3 | 0 | 2156 | 1651 | 130.6 | 60 |
| 3 | Frankston | 18 | 12 | 6 | 0 | 2312 | 1999 | 115.7 | 48 |
| 4 | Camberwell | 18 | 11 | 7 | 0 | 2385 | 1898 | 125.7 | 44 |
| 5 | Sandringham | 18 | 11 | 7 | 0 | 2777 | 2378 | 116.8 | 44 |
| 6 | Port Melbourne | 18 | 10 | 8 | 0 | 2532 | 2032 | 124.6 | 40 |
| 7 | Williamstown | 18 | 10 | 8 | 0 | 2335 | 2254 | 103.6 | 40 |
| 8 | Coburg | 18 | 9 | 9 | 0 | 2186 | 1991 | 109.8 | 36 |
| 9 | Springvale | 18 | 5 | 13 | 0 | 1949 | 2419 | 80.6 | 20 |
| 10 | Prahran | 18 | 5 | 13 | 0 | 1796 | 2425 | 74.1 | 20 |
| 11 | Werribee | 18 | 3 | 15 | 0 | 1707 | 2627 | 65.0 | 12 |
| 12 | Dandenong | 18 | 1 | 17 | 0 | 1476 | 2969 | 49.7 | 4 |

Rules for classification: 1) points; 2) percentage; 3) number of points for.
(P) Premiers

=== Finals ===
| | Semi-finals |
| Sunday, 2 September | Frankston 18.16 (124) | def. | Camberwell 9.16 (70) | Junction Oval (crowd: 3,751) |
| Sunday, 9 September | Preston 17.19 (131) | def. | Geelong West 10.26 (86) | Junction Oval (crowd: 4,090) |

| | Preliminary Final |
| Sunday, 16 September | Geelong West 9.18 (72) | def. by | Frankston 16.11 (107) | Junction Oval (crowd: 2,645) |

1984 VFA Division 1 Grand Final
Sunday, 23 September | Preston | def. | Frankston | Junction Oval (crowd: 8,664)
6.7 (43); 9.15 (69); 14.15 (99); 19.21 (135) | Q1; Q2; Q3; Final | 5.0 (30); 5.2 (32); 9.7 (61); 12.9 (81) | Umpires: Graeme Marcy, Phillips; Norm Goss Memorial Medal: Neil Jordan (Preston)
Bourke 5, Salvador 3, Atkin 2, Brine 2, Hackney 2, Halas 2, Jordan 2, Fyffe | Goals | Boyd 5, Baldwin 2, Thomas 2, Walsh 2, Membrey
Plowman, for striking Bardoel | Reports

=== Awards ===
- The leading goalkicker for the second consecutive season was Mark Fotheringham (Williamstown), who kicked 114 goals during the home-and-away season and did not participate in finals.
- The J. J. Liston Trophy was won by Peter Geddes (Frankston), who polled 18 votes. Geddes finished ahead of Kim Kershaw (Williamstown), Ross Gallagher (Sandringham) and Kevin Sait (Williamstown), who all polled 13 votes.
- Preston won the seconds premiership, after it defeated Port Melbourne in the grand final. It also won the thirds premiership; it was the second consecutive season in which Preston won the premiership in all three grades.

== Division 2 ==
The Division 2 home-and-away season was played over eighteen rounds; the top four then contested the finals under the Page–McIntyre system. The finals were played at Toorak Park.

The home-and-away fixture had already been released when Yarraville's membership was revoked. Rather than redraft the fixture, the club drawn to play Yarraville each week instead had a bye; because the fixture was unbalanced, this meant that seven clubs had two byes and four clubs had one bye. In the ladder, a bye was treated as though it were a Yarraville forfeiture: the club was awarded a win and four premiership points, was credited with the round's average winning score as 'points for', and debited the round's average losing score as 'points against'. The ladder as it is shown here distinguishes byes from wins in completed matches, but not all sources make this distinction.

=== Ladder ===
1984 VFA Division 2 Ladder
| Pos | Team | Pld | W | WB | D | L | PF | PA | % | Pts |
|---|---|---|---|---|---|---|---|---|---|---|
| 1 | Box Hill (P) | 18 | 14 | 2 | 0 | 2 | 2899 | 1581 | 183.4 | 64 |
| 2 | Brunswick | 18 | 13 | 2 | 1 | 2 | 2753 | 1535 | 179.3 | 62 |
| 3 | Oakleigh | 18 | 12 | 2 | 0 | 4 | 2893 | 1537 | 188.2 | 56 |
| 4 | Caulfield | 18 | 12 | 1 | 1 | 4 | 2269 | 1670 | 135.9 | 54 |
| 5 | Waverley | 18 | 11 | 2 | 1 | 4 | 2259 | 1738 | 130.0 | 54 |
| 6 | Moorabbin | 18 | 7 | 2 | 1 | 8 | 2060 | 2079 | 99.1 | 38 |
| 7 | Berwick | 18 | 7 | 2 | 0 | 9 | 2302 | 2001 | 115.0 | 36 |
| 8 | Mordialloc | 18 | 5 | 1 | 0 | 12 | 1989 | 2163 | 92.0 | 24 |
| 9 | Northcote | 18 | 4 | 2 | 0 | 12 | 1884 | 2165 | 87.0 | 24 |
| 10 | Kilsyth | 18 | 2 | 1 | 0 | 15 | 1282 | 2889 | 44.4 | 12 |
| 11 | Sunshine | 18 | 1 | 1 | 0 | 16 | 1397 | 3202 | 43.6 | 8 |

Rules for classification: 1) points; 2) percentage; 3) number of points for.
(P) Premiers

=== Finals ===
| | Semi-finals |
| Sunday, 26 August | Oakleigh 15.14 (104) | def. | Caulfield 15.12 (102) | Toorak Park |
| Sunday, 2 September | Box Hill 19.19 (133) | def. | Brunswick 13.6 (84) | Toorak Park (crowd: 6,200) |

| | Preliminary Final |
| Sunday, 9 September | Brunswick 16.18 (114) | def. by | Oakleigh 26.15 (171) | Toorak Park (crowd: 3,520) |

1984 VFA Division 2 Grand Final
Sunday, 16 September | Box Hill | def. | Oakleigh | Toorak Park (crowd: 10,735)
6.9 (45); 12.11 (83); 21.18 (144); 32.23 (215) | Q1; Q2; Q3; Final | 3.2 (20); 3.7 (25); 10.11 (71); 11.14 (80) | Umpires: Vergona, Casey
Carroll 10, Nicholson 5, Bolton 3, A. Dickinson 3, Brown 2, Stark 2, Withers 2, R. Witnish 2, Gleeson, O'Shea, Teakel | Goals | Pretto 3, M. Roach 2, S. Roach 2, Dyrden, Harper, McDonald, Sutherland

=== Awards ===
- The leading goalkicker for the season was Dale Carroll (Box Hill), who kicked 110 goals during the season, including finals.
- The J. Field Medal was originally won outright by Peter Nicholson (Box Hill), who polled 19 votes, including six first preferences. Nicholson originally finished ahead of David Callander (Brunswick) on a countback; Callander polled 19 votes with four first preferences. A decision was made in 1989 to retrospectively eliminate the countback, so Nicholson and Callander are now recognized as joint Field Medallists.
- Brunswick won the seconds premiership for the second consecutive season. Brunswick 17.13 (115) defeated Box Hill 8.12 (60) in the Grand Final, played as a curtain-raiser to the senior Grand Final on 16 September.

== Notable events ==
=== Interleague matches ===
The Association's Division 1 and Division 2 teams each played one interleague match during the season. Gary Brice was coach of the Division 1 team for the fourth consecutive season, despite the fact that he was no longer an Association coach: he had left Port Melbourne and was now serving as a specialist coach at League club Essendon; Ray Shaw (Preston) was captain. Geoff Rosenow (Mordialloc) was coach of the Division 2 team, and Peter Allen (Berwick) was captain.

| | 1984 Interleague Matches |
| Sunday, 13 May | S.A.F.A. 15.14 (104) | def. by | V.F.A. Second Division 17.14 (116) | Thebarton Oval |
| Sunday, 17 June | V.A.F.A. 14.11 (95) | def. by | V.F.A. First Division 22.14 (146) | Elsternwick Park (crowd: 5,000) |

=== Other notable events ===
- The two-division format was abandoned in the thirds competition, in response to the increasingly heavy losses which were suffered by first division clubs with weak Thirds teams during the previous season. Under the new format, the thirds played as one large division; in the first seven rounds, the clubs were fixtured against their nearest opponents by being split into three groups geographically; based on a full ranking from 1–23, clubs were split into four groups (1st–6th, 7th–12th, 13th–18th and 19th–23rd) and their round 8–12 matches were fixtured within those groups; and then based on another full ranking from 1–23, the clubs were again split into four groups to determine their round 13–17 matches. The finals then featured the top six teams.
- Moorabbin moved its home ground from Moorabbin Oval to McKinnon Reserve from 1984. The club had rented Moorabbin Oval from the St Kilda Football Club for $1,000 per game in 1983, plus paid $1,500 in rent for the year for McKinnon Reserve as a training ground; but, after taking much less revenue from sponsorship and membership than it had budgeted for, it recognised that it needed to find a home ground for games at a lower cost.
- On 12 August, Camberwell defeated Port Melbourne for the first time since 24 June 1950, a streak of more than 34 years (although the clubs were in the same division for only 14 of those years).
- In the Division 2 Grand Final, Box Hill scored 32.23 (215) and defeated Oakleigh by 135 points, both of which are records for an Association Grand Final in either division.
- For the first time since 1981, Association games were broadcast on television, albeit only for the last six weeks of the season. The Association arranged a deal with Network Ten for a live telecast of one game in each of the last two rounds of the home-and-away season, and for all of the Division 1 finals.
- The Division 1 finals crowds were the lowest for many years, with fewer than 10,000 attending the Grand Final. One reason for this was that the Victorian Football League had received permission at mid-season to play its finals on Sundays for the first time; but the effect of live telecasts on the gate, and the fact that Preston was the only one of the four finalists which was noted for drawing strong crowds were also contributing factors. The Association sought as much as $70,000 compensation from the League for the effect its Sunday finals had on Association gates, but received only $9,000.

== See also ==
- List of VFA/VFL premiers
