= 2006 VFL season =

- Teams: 13
- Premiers: Sandringham; 10th premiership
- Minor premiers: Northern Bullants; 8th minor premiership
- Leading goalkicker: Aaron Edwards (Frankston)
- Matches played: 126

The 2006 VFL season was the 125th season of the Victorian Football League (VFL), a second-tier Australian rules football competition played in the states of Victoria and Tasmania.

== League affiliations ==
Prior to the 2006 season, the VFL–AFL reserves affiliation which had existed for the previous three seasons between North Melbourne and Port Melbourne was terminated. In its place, North Melbourne arranged to be affiliated with both North Ballarat and Tasmania, with half of its reserves players allocated to each team. Port Melbourne continued as a stand-alone senior team in the competition.

As a result, the competition stayed constant at thirteen teams: ten VFL–AFL affiliations, one AFL reserves team (Geelong) and two stand-alone VFL teams (Port Melbourne and Frankston).

Prior to the season, Springvale came to an arrangement with the City of Casey to relocate to the new Casey Fields multi-sports complex in Cranbourne East. The club changed its name to the Casey Scorpions.

== Ladder ==
Pos	Team	Pld	W	L	D	PF	PA	PP	Pts	
1	Northern Bullants	18	17	1	0	1983	1113	178.2	68	Finals
2	Sandringham (P)	18	13	5	0	1926	1505	128.0	52	Finals
3	Geelong reserves	18	13	5	0	1784	1633	109.2	52	Finals
4	Williamstown	18	11	7	0	1690	1490	113.4	44	Finals
5	Frankston	18	10	8	0	1857	1575	117.9	40	Finals
6	Werribee	18	10	8	0	1900	1759	108.0	40	Finals
7	North Ballarat	18	9	9	0	1816	1757	103.4	36	Finals
8	Coburg	18	9	9	0	1623	1614	100.6	36	Finals
9	Tasmania	18	7	11	0	1754	1844	95.1	28	
10	Box Hill	18	6	12	0	1609	2108	76.3	24	
11	Casey Scorpions	18	5	13	0	1529	1862	82.1	20	
12	Bendigo	18	4	14	0	1516	1991	76.1	16	
13	Port Melbourne	18	3	15	0	1490	2226	66.9	12	

Rules for classification: 1) points; 2) percentage; 3) number of points for.
(P) Premiers

== Finals series ==
Qualifying and elimination finals
2 September, AMF Oval
1	Northern Bullants	12.13 (85)
4	Williamstown	19.16 (130)
2 September, Frankston Oval
5	Frankston	20.13 (133)
8	Coburg	13.4 (82)
3 September, TEAC Oval
6	Werribee	16.12 (108)
7	North Ballarat	28.16 (184)
2 September, TEAC Oval
2	Sandringham	20.16 (136)
3	Geelong	17.13 (115)

Semi-finals
9 September, TEAC Oval
Northern Bullants	15.10 (100)
Frankston	11.15 (81)
10 September, TEAC Oval
Geelong	19.14 (128)
North Ballarat	19.8 (122)

Preliminary finals
17 September, TEAC Oval
Williamstown	12.16 (88)
Geelong	17.13 (115)
16 September, TEAC Oval
Sandringham	23.14 (152)
Northern Bullants	10.12 (72)

Grand final
24 September, Optus Oval
Geelong	11.7 (73)
Sandringham	13.13 (91)

=== Grand Final ===
2006 VFL Grand Final
Sunday 24 September (2:10 pm)	Sandringham	def.	Geelong	Optus Oval (crowd: 6,000)
2.7 (19); 6.4 (40); 11.9 (75); 13.13 (91)	Q1; Q2; Q3; Final	4.3 (27); 4.3 (27); 6.5 (41); 11.7 (73)	Norm Goss Memorial Medal: Phillip Read (Sandringham)
Sautner 3, Biddlecombe 2, Motlop 2, Smith 2, Dunn, Gallagher, Liddell, Wheatley	Goals	Kingsley 4, Byrne 2, Ablett, Hunt, McCarthy, Slade

== Season awards ==
=== Awards ===
- The Jim 'Frosty' Miller Medal was won by Aaron Edwards (Frankston), who kicked 88 goals.
- The J. J. Liston Trophy was also won by Aaron Edwards (Frankston), who polled 18 votes. Edwards finished ahead of Brett Johnson (Williamstown), who was second with 17 votes, and Daniel Harford (Northern Bullants), who was third with 14 votes.
- The Fothergill–Round Medal was won by Jason Davenport (Geelong reserves).
- Box Hill won the reserves premiership. Box Hill 10.11 (71) defeated Williamstown 8.11 (59) in the Grand Final, held as a curtain-raiser to the Seniors Grand Final on 24 September.
- The Northern Bullants won the VFL Club Championship as the best-performing club across the senior and reserves competitions during the home-and-away season.

=== VFL Team of the Year ===
2006 Victorian Team of the Year
B:	David Biagi (Casey)	Shaun Pollard (Frankston)	Andy Biddlecombe (Sandringham)
HB:	Daniel Harford (Northern Bullants)	Justin Crow (Northern Bullants)	Jordan Doering (Bendigo)
C:	David Gallagher (Sandringham)	James Byrne (Geelong) (Capt.)	Kyle Matthews (Casey)
HF:	Tim Hazell (Port Melbourne)	Digby Morrell (Northern Bullants)	Brett Geappen (Tasmania)
F:	James Podsiadly (Werribee)	Aaron Edwards (Frankston)	Salim Hassan (Werribee)
Foll:	Warren Carlyle (Port Melbourne)	Brett Johnson (Williamstown)	James Allen (Werribee)
Int:	Jacob King (Coburg)	Neil Winterton (Frankston)	Steven Greene (Williamstown)
Int:	Matthew Sharkey (North Ballarat)		

== Notable events ==
- Commencing this season, a two year rule trial was conducted throughout the VFL premiership season on behalf of the AFL, under which a backwards kick to a team-mate which was caught in the defensive half of the ground would be called play-on instead of a mark; a line was painted across the centre of the field to accommodate.
