= 1978 VFA season =

1978 VFA Premiership Season
- Teams: 20

Division 1
- Teams: 10
- Premiers: Prahran (5th premiership)
- Minor premiers: Port Melbourne (12th minor premiership)

Division 2
- Teams: 10
- Premiers: Frankston (1st D2 premiership)
- Minor premiers: Frankston (2nd D2 minor premiership)

The 1978 Victorian Football Association season was the 97th season of the top division of the Australian rules football competition, and the 18th season of second division competition. The Division 1 premiership was won by the Prahran Football Club, after it defeated Preston in the Grand Final on 24 September by 22 points; it was Prahran's fifth and last Division 1 premiership. The Division 2 premiership was won by Frankston; it is the only Association premiership in either division won by the club to date.

== Division 1 ==
The Division 1 home-and-away season was played over 18 rounds; the top four then contested the finals under the Page–McIntyre system. The finals were played at the St Kilda Cricket Ground.

=== Ladder ===
1978 VFA Division 1 Ladder
| | TEAM | P | W | L | D | PF | PA | Pct | PTS |
| 1 | Port Melbourne | 18 | 13 | 5 | 0 | 2305 | 1994 | 115.5 | 52 |
| 2 | Preston | 18 | 12 | 5 | 1 | 2175 | 1995 | 109.0 | 50 |
| 3 | Prahran | 18 | 11 | 6 | 1 | 2221 | 1965 | 113.0 | 46 |
| 4 | Dandenong | 18 | 11 | 7 | 0 | 2276 | 2017 | 112.8 | 44 |
| 5 | Coburg | 18 | 10 | 8 | 0 | 2087 | 1887 | 110.5 | 40 |
| 6 | Sandringham | 18 | 8 | 10 | 0 | 2054 | 1967 | 104.4 | 32 |
| 7 | Brunswick | 18 | 8 | 10 | 0 | 1820 | 1907 | 95.4 | 32 |
| 8 | Geelong West | 18 | 7 | 11 | 0 | 1936 | 2180 | 88.8 | 28 |
| 9 | Caulfield | 18 | 6 | 12 | 0 | 1937 | 2301 | 84.1 | 24 |
| 10 | Mordialloc | 18 | 3 | 15 | 0 | 1783 | 2381 | 74.8 | 12 |
| Key: P = Played, W = Won, L = Lost, D = Drawn, PF = Points For, PA = Points Against, Pct = Percentage; (P) = Premiers, PTS = Premiership points | | | | | | | | Source | |

=== Finals ===
| | Semi-finals |
| Sunday, 3 September | Prahran 21.16 (142) | def. | Dandenong 17.15 (117) | St Kilda Cricket Ground (crowd: 7,932) |
| Sunday, 10 September | Port Melbourne 19.16 (130) | def. by | Preston 20.14 (134) | St Kilda Cricket Ground (crowd: 14,480) |

| | Preliminary Final |
| Sunday, 17 September | Port Melbourne 16.16 (112) | def. by | Prahran 20.14 (134) | St Kilda Cricket Ground (crowd: 10,475) |

1978 VFA Division 1 Grand Final
Sunday, 24 September | Preston | def. by | Prahran | St Kilda Cricket Ground (crowd: 29,565)
5.3 (33); 10.11 (71); 13.12 (90); 17.17 (119) | Q1; Q2; Q3; Final | 8.3 (51); 9.7 (61); 18.12 (120); 21.15 (141) | Umpires: Rex Wenn
Cann 4, Gonsalves 3, Lorenzini 2, Marks 2, Renwick 2, Wilmot 2, Durward, Ringin | Goals | Smith 7, Johnston 4, Preen 4, Austin 2, Clarke, Dwyer, Kekovich, Taylor
Wilmot, for striking Kekovich in the third quarter Wilmot, for striking McGuinness in the third quarter Martin, for striking Kekovich in the third quarter Martin, for striking Jeffrey in the third quarter Martin, for headbutting Chapman in the third quarter | Reports | Anderson, for striking Gonsalves in the third quarter Kekovich, for attempting to striking Martin in the second quarter McGuinness, for striking Marshall in the third quarter

=== Awards ===
- The leading goalkicker for the third consecutive season was Fred Cook (Port Melbourne). Cook kicked 103 goals in the home-and-away season and 115 goals overall.
- The J. J. Liston Trophy was won jointly by Barry Nolan (Brunswick) and Trevor Durward (Preston); the two could not be separated on countback, each polling fourteen first preferences and four second preferences, for a total of 32 votes. Laurie Burt (Coburg) was third with 28 votes.
- Preston won the seconds premiership. Preston 10.13 (73) defeated Port Melbourne 10.12 (72) in the Grand Final, played as a stand-alone match on Saturday 16 September at Toorak Park.
- Werribee won the lightning premiership. Werribee 5.2 (32) defeated Sandringham 3.10 (28) in the Grand Final, played as a curtain-raiser to the senior Grand Final on Sunday 24 September. Werribee was the only Division 2 club to win the lightning premiership in the eight years it existed from 1972 to 1979, and it was the first Association title of any kind won by the club.

== Division 2 ==
The Division 2 home-and-away season was played over eighteen rounds; the top four then contested the finals under the Page–McIntyre system; all finals were played on Sundays at Toorak Park.

=== Ladder ===
1978 VFA Division 2 Ladder
| | TEAM | P | W | L | D | PF | PA | Pct | PTS |
| 1 | Frankston (P) | 18 | 15 | 3 | 0 | 2608 | 1787 | 145.9 | 60 |
| 2 | Camberwell | 18 | 14 | 4 | 0 | 2341 | 1527 | 153.3 | 56 |
| 3 | Oakleigh | 18 | 12 | 5 | 1 | 2284 | 1964 | 116.2 | 50 |
| 4 | Yarraville | 18 | 12 | 6 | 0 | 2136 | 1833 | 116.5 | 48 |
| 5 | Northcote | 18 | 10 | 8 | 0 | 2222 | 1944 | 114.3 | 40 |
| 6 | Waverley | 18 | 8 | 9 | 1 | 1881 | 2065 | 91.0 | 34 |
| 7 | Sunshine | 18 | 7 | 10 | 1 | 1930 | 2243 | 86.0 | 30 |
| 8 | Werribee | 18 | 6 | 12 | 0 | 1816 | 2277 | 79.8 | 24 |
| 9 | Williamstown | 18 | 3 | 15 | 0 | 1852 | 2462 | 75.2 | 12 |
| 10 | Box Hill | 18 | 1 | 16 | 1 | 1638 | 2606 | 62.8 | 6 |
| Key: P = Played, W = Won, L = Lost, D = Drawn, PF = Points For, PA = Points Against, Pct = Percentage; (P) = Premiers, PTS = Premiership points | | | | | | | | Source | |

=== Finals ===
| | Semi-finals |
| Sunday, 20 August | Oakleigh 28.22 (190) | def. | Yarraville 15.10 (100) | Toorak Park (crowd: 5,000) |
| Sunday, 27 August | Frankston 18.12 (120) | def. | Camberwell 16.8 (104) | Toorak Park (crowd: 6,500) |

| | Preliminary Final |
| Sunday, 3 September | Camberwell 15.26 (116) | def. | Oakleigh 10.19 (79) | Toorak Park (crowd: 5,000) |

1978 VFA Division 2 Grand Final
Sunday, 10 September | Frankston | def. | Camberwell | Toorak Park (crowd: 8,000)
1.2 (8); 7.7 (49); 9.8 (62); 15.13 (103) | Q1; Q2; Q3; Final | 2.4 (16); 5.5 (35); 9.11 (65); 13.11 (89) | Umpires: Roy Groom
Hunter 6, Orchard 3, Roberts 3, Bell, Boyd, Sampson | Goals | Hammond 5, B. Smith 3, Adgemis, Hirst, Spithill, Withers, Wright
Lewis, for striking Hook in the second quarter | Reports
Scores were level twenty minutes into the final quarter.

=== Awards ===
- The leading goalkicker for Division 2 was Mark Fotheringham (Yarraville) who kicked 100 goals in the home-and-away season and 105 goals overall. Fotheringham, aged 21, was playing his first season of senior Association football.
- The J. Field Medal was won by Lance Styles (Waverley), who polled 39 votes. Styles finished ahead of Richard Radziminski (Sunshine), who finished second with 37 votes, and Ray Orchard (Frankston), who finished third with 30 votes.
- Oakleigh won the seconds premiership. Oakleigh 24.10 (154) defeated Camberwell 23.12 (150) in the Grand Final, played as a stand-alone match on Saturday, 9 September at Northcote Park.

== Notable events ==
=== NFL Night Series ===
The top three Association clubs from 1977 – Port Melbourne, Sandringham and Coburg – were invited to participate in the NFL Night Series, known this year as the Escort Cup. In the competition, played on Tuesday nights concurrently with the premiership season:

- Port Melbourne defeated New South Wales by 46 points, then Queensland by 32 points, before losing its semi-final against South Adelaide by five points.
- Sandringham defeated Australian Capital Territory by four points, before losing its quarter-final to South Adelaide by 59 points.
- Coburg defeated East Perth by 22 points, before losing its quarter-final against Glenelg by 17 points.

=== Interleague matches ===
The Association played an interleague representative match against Queensland for the second consecutive season.

| | 1978 Interleague Matches |
| Sunday, 4 June | Queensland 18.14 (122) | def. | V.F.A. 12.20 (92) | Gabba |

=== Other notable events ===
- On 28 May, Box Hill ended a 29-game losing streak dating back to Round 15, 1976, after coming from seven goals behind to draw with Sunshine; Sunshine 15.17 (107) led Box Hill 9.11 (65) at three-quarter time, but Box Hill made up the deficit with the wind in the final quarter to record a draw, 17.17 (119) apiece. Box Hill's winless streak extended to 34 games before it recorded its sole win for the season against Williamstown in Round 13.
- On 20 August, Preston recovered from a 39-point half time deficit to defeat Coburg by one point. When the final siren sounded, the scoreboard showed the clubs tied on 17.12 (114) apiece, but after the goal umpires conferred, the score was confirmed to be Preston 17.13 (115) d. Coburg 17.12 (114).
- In the Division 1 preliminary final, Prahran overcame a four-goal final quarter deficit to defeat Port Melbourne by 22 points; the win broke an eleven-game losing streak by Prahran against Port Melbourne.
- Prior to the Division 2 Grand Final, Frankston and Camberwell players became engaged in a scuffle after a disagreement during the warm-up.
- In its Lightning Premiership semi-final, Werribee forward John Bellin kicked a goal after the final siren to secure victory against Coburg; Werribee 7.1 (43) d. Coburg 6.2 (38).

== See also ==
- List of VFA/VFL premiers
