= 2004 VFL season =

123rd season of the Victorian Football League

- Teams: 13
- Premiers: Sandringham; 8th premiership
- Minor premiers: Port Melbourne; 17th minor premiership

The 2004 VFL season was the 123rd season of the Victorian Football League (VFL), a second-tier Australian rules football competition played in the states of Victoria and Tasmania.

Sandringham won the premiership for the eighth time, after defeating Port Melbourne by four points in the 2004 VFL Grand Final.

== Ladder ==
2004 VFL season
Pos	Team	Pld	W	L	D	PF	PA	PP	Pts	
1	Port Melbourne	18	14	4	0	2025	1504	134.6	56	Finals
2	Sandringham (P)	18	13	5	0	1730	1293	133.8	52	Finals
3	Werribee	18	12	6	0	1565	1285	121.8	48	Finals
4	North Ballarat	18	11	7	0	1516	1380	109.9	44	Finals
5	Tasmania	18	11	7	0	1558	1596	97.6	44	Finals
6	Coburg	18	11	7	0	1391	1448	96.1	44	Finals
7	Box Hill	18	10	8	0	1659	1597	103.9	40	Finals
8	Bendigo	18	9	9	0	1725	1736	99.4	36	Finals
9	Geelong reserves	18	7	11	0	1578	1566	100.8	28	
10	Williamstown	18	6	12	0	1465	1832	80.0	24	
11	Frankston	18	5	13	0	1388	1551	89.5	20	
12	Northern Bullants	18	5	13	0	1329	1514	87.8	20	
13	Springvale	18	3	15	0	1375	2002	68.7	12	

Rules for classification: 1) points; 2) percentage; 3) number of points for.
(P) Premiers

== Finals Series ==
Qualifying and elimination finals
August 29, North Port Oval
1	Port Melbourne	17.20 (122)
4	North Ballarat	8.12 (60)
August 28, York Park
5	Tasmania	16.10 (106)
8	Bendigo	13.9 (87)
August 28, North Port Oval
6	Coburg	8.11 (59)
7	Box Hill	9.14 (68)
August 28, North Port Oval
2	Sandringham	11.17 (83)
3	Werribee	7.10 (52)

Semi-finals
September 4, Bellerive Oval
North Ballarat	13.6 (84)
Tasmania	15.9 (99)
September 5, North Port Oval
Werribee	11.15 (81)
Box Hill	13.11 (89)

Preliminary finals
September 11, North Port Oval
Port Melbourne	11.15 (81)
Box Hill	8.5 (53)
September 12, North Port Oval
Sandringham	12.10 (82)
Tasmania	6.8 (44)

Grand final
September 19, Optus Oval
Port Melbourne	9.9 (63)
Sandringham	9.13 (67)

=== Grand Final ===
2004 VFL Grand Final
Sunday 19 September (2:10 pm)	Port Melbourne	def. by	Sandringham	Optus Oval (crowd: 8,196)
4.3 (27); 6.5 (41); 7.7 (49); 9.9 (63)	Q1; Q2; Q3; Final	3.3 (21); 7.7 (49); 9.11 (65); 9.13 (67)	Umpires: Donlon, Kamolins, Sully; Norm Goss Memorial Medal: Guy Rigoni (Sandringham)
J. Clayton 2, Grima 2, Pitt 2, Aloi, Baird, Harding	Goals	Sautner 4, Williams 2, Crowe, Gallagher, Sylvia
Sandringham led by 17 points at the 26-minute mark of the final quarter. Two quick goals to Port Melbourne closed the margin to five points, and a final shot from fifty metres out with only a few seconds remaining was on target but fell just short and was rushed for a behind.

== Awards ==
- The Jim 'Frosty' Miller Medal was won for the sixth consecutive year by Nick Sautner (Sandringham), who kicked 60 goals.
- The J. J. Liston Trophy was won by Julian Field (North Ballarat), who polled 16 votes. Field finished ahead of Adam Fisher (Sandringham), who was second with 13 votes, and Jeremy Clayton (Port Melbourne), Daniel Harford (Northern Bullants) and Trent Bartlett (Tasmania), who were equal-third with 11 votes.
- The Fothergill–Round Medal was won by Adam Fisher (Sandringham).
- Port Melbourne won the reserves premiership. Port Melbourne 19.13 (127) defeated Williamstown 8.15 (63) in the Grand Final, held as a curtain-raiser to the Seniors Grand Final on 19 September.

== Notable events ==
- Early in the preseason, Carlton announced its intention to terminate its affiliation with the Northern Bullants after one season, intending to resume fielding its own reserves team in the VFL. However, after a couple of months of uncertainty, the clubs revived their affiliation, with Carlton assuming greater control over the Bullants' operation and installing a Carlton assistant coach, Barry Mitchell, as Bullants senior coach.

== See also ==
- List of VFA/VFL premiers
- Australian rules football
- Victorian Football League
- Australian Football League
- 2004 AFL season
