= 2012 VFL season =

- Teams: 13
- Premiers: Geelong reserves 3rd premiership
- Minor premiers: Casey Scorpions; 3rd minor premiership
- J. J. Liston Trophy: Ben Ross (Werribee)
- Leading goalkicker: Dean Galea (Port Melbourne) 76

The 131st season of the Victorian Football League/Victorian Football Association was held in 2012. Geelong won the 2012 VFL Premiership, defeating Port Melbourne in the Grand Final.

== Season summary ==
For the 2012 VFL season, the Bendigo Football Club changed its name to the Bendigo Gold. The change came after it was announced that 2012 would be the final season Bendigo would be aligned with the Essendon Football Club, with the latter to be fielding its own reserves team in the VFL from the 2013 season.

The Northern Bullants also changed their nickname, becoming the Northern Blues and adopting navy blue and white colours in the tenth year of its affiliation with the Carlton Football Club.

The top three teams from the 2011 VFL season – Port Melbourne, Werribee and Williamstown – competed in the 2012 Foxtel Cup, with Werribee losing in the Grand Final to WAFL team Claremont.

Casey Scorpions finished on top of the ladder with fourteen wins, however lost both its finals matches to be knocked out of the finals series. Port Melbourne and Geelong progressed to the Grand Final at Etihad Stadium. Geelong won its third premiership as a stand-alone VFL team, with previous victories in 2002 and 2007.

== Ladder ==
Pos	Team	Pld	W	L	D	PF	PA	PP	Pts	Qualification
1	Casey	18	14	4	0	1633	1544	105.8	56	Finals
2	Port Melbourne	18	13	5	0	2051	1371	149.6	52	Finals
3	Geelong	18	13	5	0	1730	1398	123.7	52	Finals
4	Werribee	18	12	6	0	1906	1441	132.3	48	Finals
5	Williamstown	18	11	6	1	1591	1406	113.2	46	Finals
6	Sandringham	18	10	8	0	1724	1650	104.5	40	Finals
7	Box Hill	18	9	9	0	1653	1500	110.2	36	Finals
8	Bendigo	18	9	9	0	1691	1686	100.3	36	Finals
9	North Ballarat	18	9	9	0	1588	1747	90.9	36	
10	Northern Blues	18	6	12	0	1459	1591	91.7	24	
11	Coburg	18	4	14	0	1336	1861	71.8	16	
12	Collingwood	18	4	14	0	1293	1934	66.9	16	
13	Frankston	18	2	15	1	1182	1708	69.2	10	

Source: SportsTG
Rules for classification: 1) points; 2) percentage; 3) number of points for.

== Finals ==
=== Qualifying and Elimination Finals ===
	Qualifying Finals
Sunday, 2 September (2:00 pm)	Casey Scorpions 3.10 (28)	def. by	Werribee 6.10 (46)	Casey Fields
Sunday, 2 September (2:10 pm)	Port Melbourne 20.12 (132)	def.	Geelong 16.14 (110)	North Port Oval

	Elimination Finals
Sunday, 1 September (2:10 pm)	Williamstown 11.17 (83)	def.	Bendigo Gold 10.11 (71)	North Port Oval
Sunday, 1 September (2:00 pm)	Sandringham 14.4 (88)	def. by	Box Hill Hawks 18.10 (118)	Trevor Barker Beach Oval

=== Semi-finals ===
	Semi-finals
Saturday, 8 September (2:10 pm)	Casey Scorpions 5.8 (38)	def. by	Williamstown 11.9 (75)	Casey Fields
Sunday, 9 September (2:10 pm)	Geelong 11.10 (76)	def.	Box Hill Hawks 9.8 (62)	Casey Fields

=== Preliminary Finals ===
	Preliminary Finals
Saturday, 15 September (2:10 pm)	Port Melbourne 12.15 (87)	def.	Williamstown 7.11 (53)	North Port Oval
Sunday, 16 September (2:10 pm)	Werribee 15.13 (103)	def. by	Geelong 16.12 (108)	North Port Oval

=== Grand Final ===
Grand Final
Sunday, 23 September (2:15 pm)	Port Melbourne	def. by	Geelong	Etihad Stadium (crowd: 14,536)	Report
4.2 (26); 7.6 (48); 10.9 (69); 11.9 (75)	Q1; Q2; Q3; Final	3.4 (22); 6.10 (46); 10.15 (75); 14.24 (108)	Norm Goss Memorial Medal: George Horlin-Smith (Geelong)
D. Galea 4, H. O'Farrell 2, W. Burstin 2, S. Dwyer, C. Cain, A. Bentick	Goals	S. Kersten 3, M. Brown 2, G. Burbury 2, O. Stephenson, J. Stringer, M. Corrigan, J. Simpkin, S. Byrnes, D. Gleeson, S. Hogan
A. Bentick, S. Valenti, H. O'Farrell, S. Pleming, J. Baird, W. Burstin	Best	G. Horlin-Smith, G. Burbury, O. Stephenson, D. Simpson, S. Byrnes, R. Bathie

== Awards ==
- The J. J. Liston Trophy was won by Ben Ross (Werribee), who polled 20 votes. Ross finished ahead of Tom Couch (Casey Scorpions), who was second with 19 votes, and John Baird (Port Melbourne), who was third with 18 votes.
- The Frosty Miller Medal was won by Dean Galea (Port Melbourne), who kicked 76 goals for the season.
- The Fothergill–Round Medal was won by Dean Towers (North Ballarat)
- The top two non-AFL clubs – Port Melbourne and Werribee – qualified for the 2013 Foxtel Cup tournament.
- The premiership in the reserves, which was renamed the Development League from 2012, was won by Coburg. Coburg 16.12 (108) defeated Box Hill 15.11 (101) in the Grand Final, played as a curtain-raiser to the seniors first preliminary final on 15 September at North Port Oval.

2012 VFL Team of the Year
B:	Michael Searl (North Ballarat)	Kris Pendelbury (Collingwood)	Evan Panozza (Casey)
HB:	Brett Goodes (Williamstown)	Sam Pleming (Port Melbourne)	Leigh Osborne (Frankston)
C:	Adam Marcon (Northern Blues)	Shane Valenti (Port Melbourne)	Ben Ross (Werribee)
HF:	Kyle Martin (Frankston)	Khan Haretuku (Frankston)	Sam Dwyer (Port Melbourne)
F:	Matthew Little (Bendigo Bombers)	Dean Galea (Port Melbourne)	Chris Cain (Port Melbourne)
Foll:	Nick Meese (Northern Blues)	John Baird (Port Melbourne) (capt)	Ben Jolley (Williamstown)
Int:	Myles Sewell (North Ballarat)	Troy Selwood (Geelong)	Luke Tynan (Casey)
Int:	Myke Cook (Sandringham)	Lachlan Delahunty (Frankston)	Dean Towers (North Ballarat)
Coach:	Brett Lovett (Casey)		

== See also ==
- List of VFA/VFL premiers
- Australian Rules Football
- Victorian Football League
- Australian Football League
- 2012 AFL season
