= Bob Bonnett =

Australian rules footballer

Personal information
- Born: 1 September 1932
- Died: 11 May 2018 (aged 85)

Playing career^{1}
| Years | Club | Games (Goals) |
| 1952–1963 | Port Melbourne | 229 (933) |
- ^{1} Playing statistics correct to the end of 1963.

Robert "Bob" Bonnett (1933 – 11 May 2018) was an Australian rules footballer who played with the Port Melbourne Football Club in the Victorian Football Association (VFA) in the 1950s and 1960s.

A full-forward from the Port Melbourne area, Bonnett attracted the attention of senior recruiters while playing for the Melbourne Sunday Amateur Football League in 1950, with both South Melbourne (VFL) and City (NTFA) interested in securing his services; but in 1951, at the age of 18, he began playing with Port Melbourne in the VFA. In 1951, he was a leading full-forward in the VFA seconds, kicking 112 goals for the season, and he made his senior debut for Port Melbourne in 1952.

Over the following twelve years, Bonnett was a prolific goalkicker for Port Melbourne, kicking a then-VFA record of 933 goals through his career, passing the previous mark of 880 goals set by Frank Seymour in the 1930s; as of 2014, he is the third-highest goalkicker in VFA history, behind only Fred Cook and Rino Pretto. He was the VFA's leading goalkicker on four occasions: in 1956 (95 goals), 1957 (97 goals), 1958 (84 goals) and 1961 (a career-best 111 goals); many sources also credit him with a fifth title, in 1963 (44 goals), although contemporary sources suggest he was second behind Yarraville's Robert Evans that year. Bonnett was club captain from 1958 to 1959 and in 1962, won a premiership with the club in 1953, represented the VFA in interstate competition on a number of occasions, and was named in the Port Melbourne Football Club team of the century. He spent his entire senior career with Port Melbourne.

Bonnett retired from the seniors at the end of 1963, but continued playing as the captain-coach of the Port Melbourne Seconds team; over the following three seasons, he kicked another 301 goals in the seconds. He coached the Port Melbourne senior team from 1969 until 1971, then returned to coaching the seconds in a non-playing capacity, giving more than thirty continuous years of service to Port Melbourne across his playing and coaching roles.

Bonnett was known by the nickname 'Bonox' from his junior days, named after the beef extract product of the same name. Bonnett's younger brother Barry also spent time at full forward at Port Melbourne after Bob's retirement. In 2014, the Williamstown Rd end of North Port Oval was renamed the Bonnett End in honour of Bonnett's goalkicking achievements.
