= Roy Harper (footballer) =

Australian rules footballer (1929–2023)

Personal information
- Full name: Roy James Harper
- Born: 29 March 1929
- Died: 15 August 2023 (aged 94)
- Original team: Sandringham
- Height: 183 cm (6 ft 0 in)
- Weight: 86 kg (190 lb)

Playing career^{1}
Years	Club	Games (Goals)
1949–51	Sandringham (VFA)	
1952–55	Footscray	40 (26)
- ^{1} Playing statistics correct to the end of 1955.

Roy James Harper (29 March 1929 – 15 August 2023) was an Australian rules footballer who played with Footscray in the Victorian Football League (VFL).

A centreman and half forward from Hampton, Harper started his senior career with Sandringham in the Victorian Football Association in 1949, and built a strong reputation as he won the Sandringham best and fairest in each of 1949 and 1951. He was cleared to Footscray in the VFL in 1952; he played 34 games in his first two seasons with Footscray, but only six games in from 1954 to mid-1955. He was cleared back to Sandringham in mid-1955, and played there again until 1957.

Harper's brother Bruce Harper was also an Australian rules footballer, who kicked 534 goals in 155 games for Sandringham and was a two-time VFA leading goalkicker.
