= Mark Cross (footballer) =

Australian rules footballer (1956–2018)

Personal information
- Full name: Mark Henry Cross
- Born: 23 July 1956
- Died: 1 May 2018 (aged 61)
- Original team: West Footscray
- Height: 171 cm (5 ft 7 in)
- Weight: 73 kg (161 lb)

Playing career^{1}
Years	Club	Games (Goals)
1974	Footscray	4 (1)
1975–1979	Williamstown	74 (125)
- ^{1} Playing statistics correct to the end of 1979.

Career highlights
- Williamstown premiership 1976

Mark Cross (23 July 1956 – 1 May 2018) was an Australian rules footballer who played with Footscray in the Victorian Football League (VFL).

Cross, who was aged just 17 on his league debut, came from West Footscray. A rover, he made four appearances for Footscray, from rounds 15 to 18 in the 1974 VFL season. He was cut from Footscray's list at the end of the year.

From 1975 to 1979, Cross played for Williamstown in the Victorian Football Association. He was a member of Williamstown's 1976 premiership team and was captain of the VFA Seagulls in his final season.

Cross played 74 games and kicked 125 goals for Williamstown, none more important than the winning goal in the 1976 preliminary final against Frankston after the 'Gulls came from 5 goals down at three-quarter time to win by two points. Williamstown then won the Grand Final against red-hot favourites, Mordialloc. He was awarded the most courageous player trophy in 1975, runner-up in the 1979 Club best and fairest and was named in the forward pocket in Williamstown's 1970's Team-of-the-Decade. Cross returned to coach Williamstown in 1994.

In 1980 Cross joined Red Cliffs, a club in the Sunraysia Football League, which he coached until 1984. He was senior coach of Mildura Imperials from 1986 to 1989 and steered them to three successive premierships (1986, 1987, 1988). They were undefeated in the 1987 season.

He then coached Melbourne's Under-19s and reserves teams. With Cross as coach, the Melbourne reserves were losing grand finalists in 1990 and 1991.

His son, Joel, plays for South Adelaide and tied for the Magarey Medal in 2012.
