= Bruce Harper (Australian footballer) =

Australian rules footballer (1929–2023)

Personal information
- Full name: Bruce John Harper
- Born: 30 May 1927
- Died: 16 November 1955 (aged 28)
- Original team: Hampton

Playing career^{1}
Years	Club	Games (Goals)
1947–55	Sandringham (VFA)	155 (534)
- ^{1} Playing statistics correct to the end of 1955.

Career highlights
- VFA leading goalkicker 1950, 1951

Bruce John Harper (30 May 1927 – 15 November 1955) was an Australian rules footballer who played with Sandringham in the Victorian Football Association (VFA).

A full forward from Hampton Scouts, Harper joined Sandringham in 1947. He played a long career with Sandringham, playing 155 games over the next nine seasons, and kicking a total of 534 goals, at that time the record for the club. He was a two-time VFA leading goalkicker, in 1950 with 71 goals and in 1951 with a career-high 104 goals, and was a six-time Sandringham leading goalkicker. He was one of the best VFA forwards of his era, known for his strong mark and quick, courageous ground play.

Harper was also a cricketer, playing 60 First XI district cricket matches for Collingwood between 1950/51 and 1954/55. A fast-medium bowler, Harper took 165 wickets at 17.3 across his career with best figures of 8/30. His bowling made the news for a quirky incident when playing sub-district cricket for Brighton in 1949: his delivery hit and killed a sparrow, with the confused batsman Crowe then attempting to hit the sparrow with his bat, while the ball deviated and hit him on the pads and he was dismissed leg before wicket – the newspapers describing the incident as Crowe out for a duck off a sparrow.

Harper's brother Roy was also an Australian rules footballer, who played 83 games in two stints for Sandringham and 40 games for Footscray. In July 1955, Bruce Harper's last match for Sandringham, in which he broke his leg, happened to be Roy Harper's first match back at Sandringham after his time at Footscray.

Harper died aged 28 from a serious illness on 15 November 1955, just over four months after his final game.
