= Bert Ryan =

Australian rules footballer

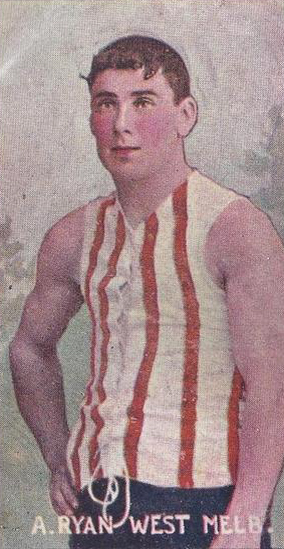
- Cigarette card of Ryan in 1906

Personal information
- Full name: Albert Edward Ryan
- Born: 3 June 1880; Port Melbourne, Victoria
- Died: 29 October 1952 (aged 72); Mont Park, Victoria
- Original team: West Melbourne
- Position: Forward

Playing career^{1}
Years	Club	Games (Goals)
1905–07	West Melbourne (VFA)	49 (58)
1908	Essendon	15 (3)
1909	Brighton (VFA)	17 (21)
1912–19	Northcote (VFA)	45 (118)
- ^{1} Playing statistics correct to the end of 1919.

Albert Edward Ryan (3 June 1880 – 29 October 1952) was an Australian rules footballer who played for Essendon in the Victorian Football League (VFL).

Ryan was an established player at West Melbourne in the Victorian Football Association (VFA) before he came to the VFL. He had finished joint first in the VFA's goal-kicking in 1903 with 44 goals and again in 1904 when he kicked 51 goals. On each occasion he was the joint winner with Richmond's Jack Hutchinson. Ryan was then a fixture in their 1906 premiership. His season at Essendon consisted of 17 matches and although they made the Grand Final that year, Ryan was not picked at all during the finals campaign.

Ryan led Australian rules football for many years, until 1952 when he suffered a stroke in the bath and was found by his wife in the early hours of the morning. He was buried at St Patrick's Cathedral, Melbourne, on 4 November 1952.
