= Rino Pretto =

Australian rules footballer

Personal information
- Full name: Rino Anthony Pretto
- Nickname: Moose
- Born: 13 June 1959 (age 67)
- Original team: Bulleen-Templestowe
- Height: 188 cm (6 ft 2 in)
- Weight: 89 kg (196 lb)
- Positions: Full-forward, full-back

Playing career^{1}
Years	Club	Games (Goals)
1978–1979	Fitzroy	1 (1)
1980	Camberwell	13 (6)
1981	Coburg	10 (3)
1982–1983	Camberwell	11 (3)
1984–1992	Oakleigh	140 (849)
1992–1994	Dandenong	47 (209)
Total		222 (1071)
- ^{1} Playing statistics correct to the end of 1994.

Rino Anthony Pretto (born 13 June 1959) is a former Australian rules footballer who played for various clubs in the Victorian Football Association (VFA) and with Fitzroy in the Victorian Football League (VFL).

After serving his apprenticeship as a full-back in the Fitzroy under-19s and reserves, Pretto finally made his senior debut late in the 1978 VFL season. The game, which took place at VFL Park, was won by Carlton who was celebrating Rod Ashman's 100th game. Pretto kicked a goal with his only kick and found himself back in the reserves the following weekend, and for the entire 1979 season.

Pretto joined the VFA in 1980 and played initially at Camberwell. He was loaned to Coburg in 1981, then returned to Camberwell for the 1982 and 1983 seasons. He was still known as a full-back at this time, but his talent as a full-forward was discovered after he kicked eight goals when filling in for an injured full-forward at Camberwell.

In 1984, he transferred to Oakleigh, and was used as a regular full-forward there. Oakleigh played in the Second Division of the VFA and Pretto was the division's leading goal-kicker on four occasions (1985–88), with his highest total in 1985 when he kicked 170 goals. In the Grand Final that year he kicked 12 goals despite playing on the losing team. His best performance in a game was in 1986 when he kicked 20 against Mordialloc, despite feeling so ill during the game that he spent the next week in hospital with a diabetic condition.

In 1989 Pretto was full-forward for the VFA's representative team which won the NFL Shield. The VFA defeated the Australian Amateurs in the final and Pretto kicked 12 goals, which is still the record number of goals in a representative match by a VFA player.

Pretto started the 1992 season with Oakleigh, but transferred to Dandenong after two rounds. He played his final three seasons with Dandenong, and topped the Association's goal-kicking with 87 goals in 1994. At retirement, the VFA interstate football representative had kicked 1070 goals, a tally only bettered by Fred Cook.

Some sources list him as playing 223 games and kicking 1095 goals in the VFA (142 games and 874 goals at Oakleigh). Pretto kicked 12 goals against Sunshine in 1989 and 13 against Brunswick-Broadmeadows in 1991, but these matches were deleted from the VFA's records as both teams dropped out of the VFA and folded during the relevant season.
