= Ron Beattie =

Australian rules footballer (1953–2026)

Personal information
- Born: 21 September 1953
- Died: 8 July 2026 (aged 72)
- Original team: Doveton
- Height: 192 cm (6 ft 4 in)
- Weight: 91 kg (201 lb)

Playing career
Years	Club	Games (Goals)
1974	Hawthorn	9 (0)

Ron Beattie (21 September 1953 – 8 July 2026) was an Australian rules footballer who played with Hawthorn in the Victorian Football League (VFL).

Beattie, a defender, made nine appearances for Hawthorn, in the second half of the 1974 VFL season.

He captained Coburg to a premiership in 1979, 51 years after their previous first-division flag.

Beattie died on 8 July 2026, at the age of 72.
