= Dean Galea =

Australian rules footballer (born 1985)

Dean Galea (born 11 January 1985) is an Australian rules footballer. He won the Jim 'Frosty' Miller Medal as the leading goal-kicker in the Victorian Football League in 2012 and 2013, kicking 65 and 55 goals in the respective home and away seasons, when he played with Port Melbourne.

Galea, in his first year of senior football, played for Spotswood in the WRFL, and won the Premier division goalkicking award with 82 goals in 2004.

Galea then moved to play with Williamstown Football Club for 2005 and 2006. He played in a Seconds premiership with Williamstown in 2005 and finished in equal third place in the Seconds best and fairest award that same year.

In 2007 he spent a season with West Adelaide in the SANFL where he kicked 30 goals in 15 senior games.

He was back at Williamstown in 2008 but was frustrated by the clubs alignment because he would be dropped when a listed AFL player returned from injury. After playing in another Seconds premiership in 2008, he was delisted by Williamstown at the end of 2009 and crossed over to the Port Melbourne Football Club in 2010. He kicked 71 goals in the 2011 season to finish second in the Frosty Miller medal to teammate Patrick Rose, another former Williamstown player. He kicked six goals in the 2011 VFL Grand Final when Port defeated his old side Williamstown. Galea was also selected in the 2012 VFL team of the year in the position of full-forward. Galea played 74 games for Port Melbourne kicking 253 goals.

Galea left the VFL for Avondale Heights in the Essendon District Football League. He also won the Premier Division Leading Goal Kicker Award in 2014. In 2014 and 2015 he has represented the EDFL Senior Team where in the 2015 interleague game he kicked an impressive 5 goals.

In 2016 he joined Keilor and continued to top the EDFL goalkicking table kicking 101 goals in 2016 and 81 goals in 2017.
