= Jamie Shaw (footballer) =

Australian rules footballer (born 1966)

Personal information
- Full name: Jamie Shaw
- Nickname: Spider
- Born: 19 February 1966 (age 60)
- Original team: Preston
- Height: 193 cm (6 ft 4 in)
- Weight: 96 kg (212 lb)
- Position: Forward

Playing career^{1}
Years	Club	Games (Goals)
1987–88	Fitzroy (VFL)	2 (5)
1985–86, 1988–93	Preston (VFA)	126 (673)
- ^{1} Playing statistics correct to the end of 1993.

Career highlights
- VFA Leading Goalkicker: 1986, 1988, 1990

Jamie Shaw (born 19 February 1966) is a former Australian rules footballer who played for Preston in the Victorian Football Association (VFA) and Fitzroy in the Victorian Football League (VFL).

A former Keon Park player, Shaw made his VFA debut for Preston in the 1985 season. He became a prolific full forward, and in 1986 won the VFL's leading goal-kicker award, now known as the Jim 'Frosty' Miller Medal, with 145 goals, including eighteen goals in one match against Camberwell.

In 1987, Shaw moved to Fitzroy in the VFL. In his debut against Geelong at Princes Park and equaled Max George's club record of five goals on debut. From just six kicks, Shaw managed five goals and a behind, helping Fitzroy beat Geelong. He played only one other game for Fitzroy, and returned to Preston at the end of the season.

In his second stint at Preston, he was the league leading goalkicker on two more occasions: 1988, with 105 goals, and 1990, with 103 goals. In a match against Sunshine in 1989, he kicked a career best 19 goals, but Sunshine dropped out of the Association after Round 8 and their record was expunged, so the match is no longer considered official. He also kicked 15 goals in a match against Camberwell in the same year.

In 1988, Shaw was caught up in a controversy surrounding the VFA's representative match against the WAFL in Perth on Tuesday 5 July. He declared himself unavailable for the game as he was caring for his ill mother, and the Association made him ineligible to play for Preston in its match on the previous weekend – a ruling intended to prevent clubs from intentionally making their star players unavailable. Preston defiantly fielded Shaw anyway, and he kicked eight goals, and Preston won the match; but the Association stripped Preston of the four points for fielding an ineligible player and awarded the game to Coburg. Preston successfully fought the decision in court, and the four points were restored just before the finals.

By the time Shaw retired from the VFA at the end of 1993, he had set a record of 673 goals for the Preston Football Club.

He was later a prolific full-forward at North Heidelberg, winning the Diamond Valley Football League leading goal-kicker award five times, including a league-record 161 goals in 1994; and finally at Corowa-Rutherglen in the Ovens & Murray Football League, where he kicked 91 goals in 1998.
