= Jack Hutchinson (footballer, born 1880) =

Jack Hutchison

Personal information
- Full name: John Hutchison
- Born: 14 February 1880; Collingwood, Victoria
- Died: 27 October 1949 (aged 69); Parkville, Victoria
- Position: forward

Playing career^{1}
| Years | Club | Games (Goals) |
| 1899–1902 | Port Melbourne | 103 (102) |
| 1904–1907 | Richmond | 70 (207) |
| 1908–1909 | Footscray | (-) |
| 1910–1912 | Port Melbourne | (103) |
- ^{1} Playing statistics correct to the end of 1912.

Career highlights
- 2x VFA premiership player: 1905, 1908; 5x VFA leading goalkicker: 1901, 1902, 1906, 1907, 1908; 3x Richmond leading goalkicker: 1904, 1906, 1907

John Hutchinson (14 February 1880 – 27 October 1949) was an Australian rules footballer who played in the Victorian Football Association (VFA) between 1899 and 1910. He played his first two seasons for the Port Melbourne Football Club then crossed to the Richmond Football Club in 1903 and played there until they left VFA at the end of the 1907 season. He then had two seasons for the Footscray Football Club and ended his career back at Port.

A talented full forward, he was the VFA's leading goalkicker for five out of eight seasons from 1901 to 1908. In 1905 he missed several matches due to injury, however, he still managed to kick 41 goals for the Tigers (only seven short of the season's leader) and play in the Richmond premiership side. He also played in Footscray's 1908 premiership.

Hutchinson's 260 goals kicked over his five seasons at Richmond was the most of any player during the club's time in the VFA. In his last season at Richmond he kicked 67 goals, at the time an individual season record for the Association. He improved on this mark by one goal in the next season, his first at Footscray. By the end of his final season he had become the first player in the VFA to kick over 500 career goals. In 1908, he kicked sixteen goals in a match against North Melbourne, which was at the time a VFA record for a player in a match.
