= Fred Cook (Australian footballer, born 1947) =

Australian rules footballer (1947–2022)

Personal information
- Full name: Frederick William Cook
- Born: 16 November 1947
- Died: 1 February 2022 (aged 74)
- Original team: Footscray Tech Old Boys
- Height: 189 cm (6 ft 2 in)
- Weight: 89 kg (196 lb)
- Position: Full forward

Playing career^{1}
| Years | Club | Games (Goals) |
| 1967–1969 | Footscray | 33 (2) |
| 1969–1970 | Yarraville | 29 (54) |
| 1971–1984 | Port Melbourne | 253 (1210) (Note: These totals refer to premiership matches (home and away and finals matches) only.) |
| 1985 | Moorabbin | 18 (72) |
| Total | | 333 (1338) |

Representative team honours
| Years | Team | Games (Goals) |
| | VFA | 9 (45) |

Coaching career^{3}
| Years | Club | Games (W–L–D) |
| 1986 | Footscray Tech | 17 (3–14–0) |
- ^{1} Playing statistics correct to the end of 1985.^{3} Coaching statistics correct as of 1986.

Career highlights
- J. J. Liston Trophy: 1970; Jim 'Frosty' Miller Medal: 1976, 1977, 1978, 1980, 1982

Frederick William Cook (16 November 1947 – 1 February 2022) was an Australian rules footballer.

He played 33 games with Footscray in the Victorian Football League (VFL) from 1967 until 1969, but it was in the Victorian Football Association (VFA) with Yarraville and Port Melbourne that he made his name.

In his brief career with Footscray, Cook played in defence and only kicked two goals; at Yarraville, he won the J. J. Liston Trophy playing as a ruckman and defender; then with Port Melbourne, he became one of the Association's premier forwards, leading the VFA goalkicking in five separate seasons and kicking an all-time VFA career record of 1336 goals from his 300 games.

== Career ==
=== Early years and VFL ===
Cook grew up in Yarraville in Melbourne's inner western suburbs, and supported Footscray in the VFL. He played football as a junior for the Footscray Tech Old Boys in the Victorian Amateur Football Association (VAFA), and then joined the Footscray Football Club in 1967 at age 19. In his second season, 1968, Cook played every game, primarily at centre half-back, and was already developing a reputation as one of the strongest marks in the league.

After the sixth round of the 1969 season, Cook was dropped from Footscray senior side to the reserves, along with six other players, as a disciplinary action for attending a family BBQ at former coach Charlie Sutton's house, which club secretary Jack Collins had thought would be a drunken swill, and had discouraged players from attending.

=== VFA ===
After two weeks in the reserves, Cook was encouraged to cross over to Yarraville in the VFA. The VFA had recently broken its permit agreement with the VFL, meaning that Cook did not require a clearance from Footscray to make the move; and, because the VFA lacked the restrictive player payments laws that the VFL had, Yarraville could offer Cook more money than he was then making at Footscray. In 1970, his first full season with Yarraville, he won the J. J. Liston Trophy for the VFA's best and fairest player playing as its first choice ruckman. Despite his efforts, Yarraville won only one game for the season and was relegated to Division 2, and Cook decided to transfer to Port Melbourne in 1971, where he continued as either a centre half-back or a centre half-forward, depending on the opposition line up.

During a 1972 pre-season practice match against Brunswick, Cook suffered a heart attack between the first and second quarters, but he managed to play the game out and still take 17 marks. He spent the next three weeks in hospital and was advised to retire from football. But, Cook was determined to play again, and made a return later that year. In his first reserves game after the heart attack, he was played at full-forward to keep him out of the heavier action, and he kicked sixteen goals. He made his return to senior football in the last game of the year, less than six months after his heart attack.

Cook was still a utility player at Port Melbourne, playing in the half-backline, ruck and forward-line depending on the needs of the team until 1974; and, in fact, in mid-1974, five years into his VFA career, he was still described as "a makeshift full-forward" by sportswriters of the time. He went on to kick 10.2 from his twelve kicks in that year's Grand Final, and thereafter he was a permanent full-forward, dominating the Association's goalkicking for the next decade. He topped the VFA's goalkicking five times in a prolific period from 1976 to 1982.

His highest VFA season tally was in 1982, when he kicked 140 goals. He played in all six of Port Melbourne's premierships and the Centenary Cup victory during the 1974–1982 period, and was a noted performer in Grand Finals, kicking 10 goals in the 1974 Grand Final, 12 goals in the Centenary Cup Grand Final, 9 goals in the 1977 Grand Final, and five goals in the infamous 1976 Grand Final, despite having been king-hit in the second quarter. He represented the VFA in interleague competition on nine occasions, including several times as captain.

He announced his retirement from Port Melbourne at the age of 36, shortly before the end of the 1984 season, having played 253 games and kicked 1210 goals for the club over 14 years; however, he had little say in the matter, as club officials indicated that he would no longer be selected in the team due to diminishing returns over his final two seasons. He made a comeback for Division 2 club Moorabbin in 1985, playing eighteen games to become the first player to play 300 VFA games, before retiring permanently.

Cook holds the record for most goals kicked in the VFA with 1336, with his record of 300 games being broken by former teammate Bill Swan in 1993.

=== VAFA return ===
After his VFA retirement, Cook returned to Footscray Tech Old Boys for the 1986 season as a player-coach, wearing the number 1.

The season was not successful, with Footscray Tech winning just three of its 17 games, finishing eighth on the F Section ladder. Cook did not return as a coach or player in 1987.

== Legacy ==
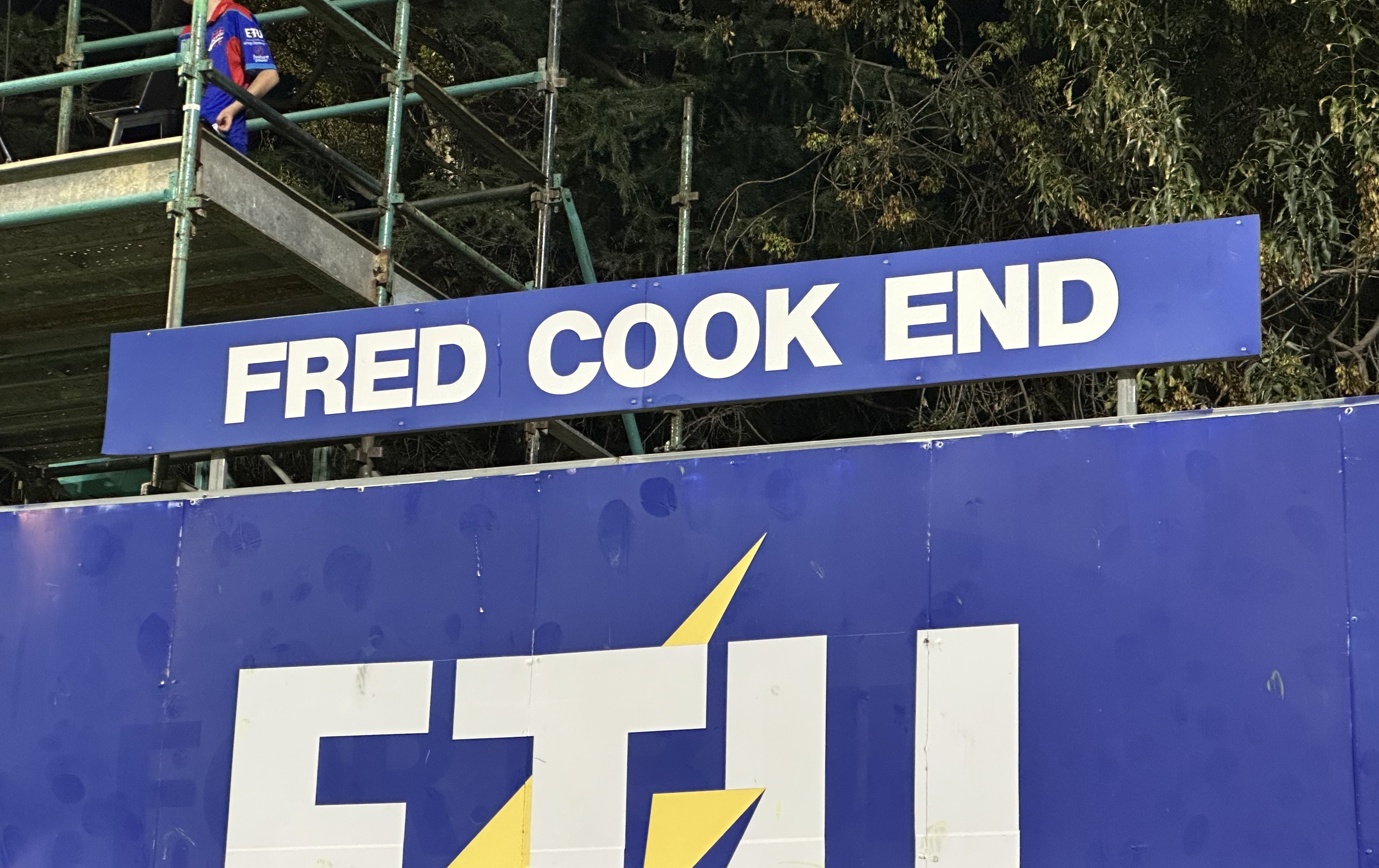
The Fred Cook End at North Port Oval

Cook's success was largely attributed to his marking: he was widely regarded as being one of the strongest and safest marks in the game, even in his early years at Footscray. Through the peak of his career, he was also one of the game's fastest sprinters over a short distance, giving him an advantage as a leading forward.

However, somewhat ironically for the VFA's all-time leading goalkicker, he was a poor kick for goal, and many observers commented that he could have kicked many more goals, and perhaps even have become the first man to kick 200 goals in a season, if he'd been a more accurate goalkicker; but, his marking was so dominant and generated so many set shots from close range that it made up for his inaccuracy.

In 2014, the Lorimer Street end of North Port Oval was renamed the Cook End in honour of Cook's goalkicking achievements for Port Melbourne.

=== VFA career statistics discrepancy ===
Cook's VFA career record is variously listed as 300, 304, 305 or 309 games and 1336, 1364, 1366, or 1394 goals, and his Port Melbourne totals listed as 253, 257, 258 or 262 games and 1210, 1238, 1240 or 1268 goals.

This discrepancy comes from whether or not senior but non-premiership games from 1977 and 1978 are included:

- For 1977, he is listed as kicking 125, 155 or 167 goals in 20, 24 or 26 games (125 goals in 20 VFA premiership games, 30 goals in four games of a once-off Centenary Cup competition, and 12 goals in two games of the NFL's Ardath Cup Night Series).
- For 1978, he is listed as kicking 115 or 131 goals in 20 or 23 games (115 goals in 20 VFA premiership games and 16 goals in three games of the Ardath Cup Night Series).

The above discrepancies arise from Norm Goss Sr., Port Melbourne's long-serving secretary, successfully lobbying VFA officials during the 1977 season to include games played in the Ardath Cup Night Series and Centenary Cup competition in players' official career statistics. The VFA rescinded this ruling after Goss' death in January 1983, but Port Melbourne continues to include these games in their club records as of 2026.

If the post-1896 VFA/VFL and these VFA representative matches and night series games are considered, then Cook's overall total of 1441 senior career goals places him third on the list of highest-ever goalkickers in elite Australian rules football history behind Ken Farmer and Tony Lockett, or if Tasmanian competitions are also considered, equal third behind Peter Hudson, Farmer and Lockett.

== Off-field ==
Throughout the 1970s, Cook became the most well-known and popular player in the VFA. His status as a marketable and likeable celebrity contributed significantly to the popularity of the VFA during that time, and he took on several media commitments, including a VFA column in The Sporting Globe and a segment on the World of Sport television program. He spoke regularly at sportsmen's nights, and had a promotions job with Puma SE. From 1982 until 1985, Cook was the publican of the Station Hotel in Port Melbourne, and his celebrity status helped to make the pub successful during that time.

While at the Station Hotel, Cook came to associate with criminal Dennis Allen, and began to use amphetamines. After 1985, Cook became addicted to the drug, which brought him close to being broke, and he later began to deal. He served three jail terms between 1990 and 1997 on drugs-related offences.

Cook died on 1 February 2022, at the age of 74.
