= Kim Smith (footballer) =

Australian rules footballer (1952–2009)

Personal information
- Full name: Kim Smith
- Born: 23 June 1952
- Died: 16 September 2009 (aged 57); Mount Eliza
- Original team: Beaumaris
- Height: 191 cm (6 ft 3 in)
- Weight: 80 kg (176 lb)
- Position: Forward

Playing career^{1}
| Years | Club | Games (Goals) |
| 1974, 1976–82 | Prahran | 136 (610) |
| 1975 | Melbourne | 4 (3) |
- ^{1} Playing statistics correct to the end of 1982.

Kim Smith (23 June 1952 – 16 September 2009) was an Australian rules footballer who played for Prahran in the Victorian Football Association (VFA) and Melbourne in the Victorian Football League (VFL).

Smith made his debut at Prahran in 1974 and finished the year as their top goal-kicker with 55 goals. The following season he played for Melbourne; he managed only four appearances, but was the VFL reserves league leading goalkicker with 61 goals. He then returned to Prahran and was their leading goal-kicker every year until his retirement in 1982, eight times in total. His tally of 97 goals in 1979 was the joint most by any player in the league and he shared the leading goal-kicker award with Geelong West's Joe Radojevic. He was also a member of Prahran's 1978 premiership team.

He died in 2009 from lung cancer.
