= Nick Sautner =

Australian rules footballer (born 1977)

Personal information
- Born: 19 June 1977 (age 49)
- Original team: Springvale
- Height: 186 cm (6 ft 1 in)

Playing career^{1}
Years	Club	Games (Goals)
1997–2000, 2004–10	Sandringham	202 (621)
2001–2002	Frankston	40 (170)
2003	Northern Bullants	18 (82)
Total		260 (873)
- ^{1} Playing statistics correct to the end of 2010.

Career highlights
- Jim 'Frosty' Miller Medal winner: 9 (Record); Premiership player (5): (1997, 2000, 2004–06); VFL Team of the Year: 9; Sandringham Captain: 2010; Sixth most games in VFA/VFL history

Nicholas Sautner (born 19 June 1977) is an Australian rules footballer, best known for his Victorian Football League (VFL) football career with the Sandringham Zebras. He also played for Frankston in 2001 and 2002 and the Northern Bullants in 2003.

He won the Jim 'Frosty' Miller Medal for leading goalkicker in the VFL a record nine times, breaking the record held by the eponymous Jim 'Frosty' Miller of six. He was league leading goalkicker a record six consecutive seasons (1999 to 2004), breaking the record of four consecutive seasons held by George Taylor (1920–1923) and Miller (1968–1971), and won the award nine times in 11 consecutive seasons (1999 to 2009).

== Career overview ==
Sautner began his VFL career in 1996 with the Springvale Football Club, playing as a defender, but he never managed a senior game for Springvale. He moved to Sandringham in 1997, where he played in a premiership side in 1997. Two years later, Sautner kicked 89 goals and won the inaugural Jim "Frosty" Miller Medal as the competition's leading goalkicker.

The 2000 season saw the VFL become affiliated with the professional Australian Football League and Sandringham affiliated with the Melbourne Football Club. Sautner kicked 70 goals and won the Frosty Miller Medal again as part of the Zebras' premiership team.

Sautner switched teams in 2001 when he moved to bayside rival Frankston and again in 2003 when he was lured to the Northern Bullants. He played a total of 58 games with those clubs, and he was the league's leading goalkicker again in all three seasons, including his career-best 93 goals in the 2002 season with Frankston.

He returned to Sandringham in 2004 and won the Frosty Miller medal for the sixth consecutive time, a VFL record, as well as winning a third premiership with the Zebras. In the following two seasons, Sautner won two more premierships, bringing his total to five (a Sandringham record), but his streak of Frosty Miller medals was broken by James Podsiadly in 2005.

Between 2007 and 2009, Sautner won another three Frosty Miller Medals, bringing his total to nine, a VFA/VFL record as of 2022.

Sautner announced his retirement from VFL football in January 2011. Sautner played with Collegians in the Victorian Amateur Football Association in 2011 and 2012, winning premierships in both seasons.

== Post-football career ==
After retiring from football, Sautner has held numerous sports administration positions. In June 2016, Sautner was announced as the General Manager Commercial at Eden Park, New Zealand. Nick Sautner was appointed CEO of Eden Park Stadium 1st November 2017.
