= Ken Marks =

Australian rules footballer

Personal information
- Full name: Ken Marks
- Born: 13 December 1951 (age 74)
- Original team: Reservoir Colts
- Height: 170 cm (5 ft 7 in)
- Weight: 69 kg (152 lb)

Playing career^{1}
Years	Club	Games (Goals)
1972	Footscray	3 (0)
- ^{1} Playing statistics correct to the end of 1972.

Ken Marks (born 13 December 1951) is a former Australian rules footballer who played with Footscray in the Victorian Football League (VFL).

Marks started his league career at Fitzroy and was a Morrish Medal winner in the 1970 VFL Under 19's competition. A rover, he never played a senior game for Fitzroy. He made three appearances with Footscray in the 1972 VFL season.

The following year he joined Preston, without a clearance, and finished third in the J. J. Liston Trophy in 1976.
