= Peter Neville =

Australian rules footballer

Personal information
- Original team: Sandringham
- Height: 180 cm (5 ft 11 in)
- Weight: 89 kg (196 lb)
- Position: Full-forward

Playing career^{1}
Years	Club	Games (Goals)
1975	Sandringham	1 (2)
1976–79, 82–83, 85	Mordialloc	126 (723)
Total		127 (725)
- ^{1} Playing statistics correct to the end of 1985.

Peter Neville is a former Australian rules footballer who was a prolific goalkicker with Mordialloc in the Victorian Football Association (VFA) in the 1970s and 1980s.

Neville played his junior football for the Sandringham Thirds in the Victorian Football Association thirds competition; quickly establishing himself as a quality full forward, Neville kicked 122 goals for the thirds in the 1973 season. He played one senior game for Sandringham in 1975, kicking 2.4 against Geelong West, but could not gain regular selection; at the time, the Sandringham senior team was already well served by full-forward Ian Cooper.

At the end of 1975, Neville was cleared to the neighbouring Mordialloc Football Club, then playing in Division 2, and Neville immediately became its permanent full forward. In 1976, his first full season of senior football, Neville was the leading goalkicker in Division 2, kicking 134 goals. In 1977, he was part of Mordialloc's Division 2 premiership team, and kicked eight goals in the Grand Final. In 1979, he won the Division 2 goalkicking title for the second time with 132 goals, and 95 goals saw him placed third in 1980.

Neville left Mordialloc in 1981, playing for Templestowe in the Diamond Valley Football League and Maffra in the Latrobe Valley Football League, before returning to Mordialloc in mid-1982. He was Division 2's leading goalkicker for the third time in 1983, kicking 135 goals. He left the club again in 1984, then returned in 1985, but retired after only two games after suffering an arm injury.

Across his VFA career, Neville kicked 725 goals from only 127 games. He kicked an average of 5.70 goals per game, which is a record among VFA players with 600 or more career goals. His 723 goals for Mordialloc was a club record.

Neville also played turf cricket for Hampton for more than forty years, where he was a four-time club champion and is a life member.
