= James Byrne (footballer) =

Australian rules footballer, born 1978

Personal information
- Full name: James Byrne
- Born: 23 April 1978 (age 48); Wagga Wagga
- Original team: Glenelg
- Draft: 4th overall, 2000 Pre-season draft
- Height: 183 cm (6 ft 0 in)
- Weight: 85 kg (187 lb)

Playing career^{1}
Years	Club	Games (Goals)
2000–2001	Adelaide	24 (4)
- ^{1} Playing statistics correct to the end of 2001.

Career highlights
- South Fremantle best and fairest 2003; JJ Liston Trophy 2007

James Byrne (born 23 April 1978) is an Australian rules footballer who played in the Australian Football League (AFL). He played 24 AFL games with the Adelaide Crows and after he was delisted he has played for several other clubs. He was captain of the Geelong Football Club in the Victorian Football League (VFL).

In 2007 he led the Geelong Football Club VFL side to a grand final win over the Coburg Tigers winning 17.24.126 to 7.10.52. To cap a quality season he also was awarded the JJ Liston Trophy for the best and fairest in the VFL. Byrne retired at the end of the 2008 AFL season. He joined Essendon as a Development Coach at the beginning of the 2012 Season.
