= Jim "Frosty" Miller =

Australian rules footballer

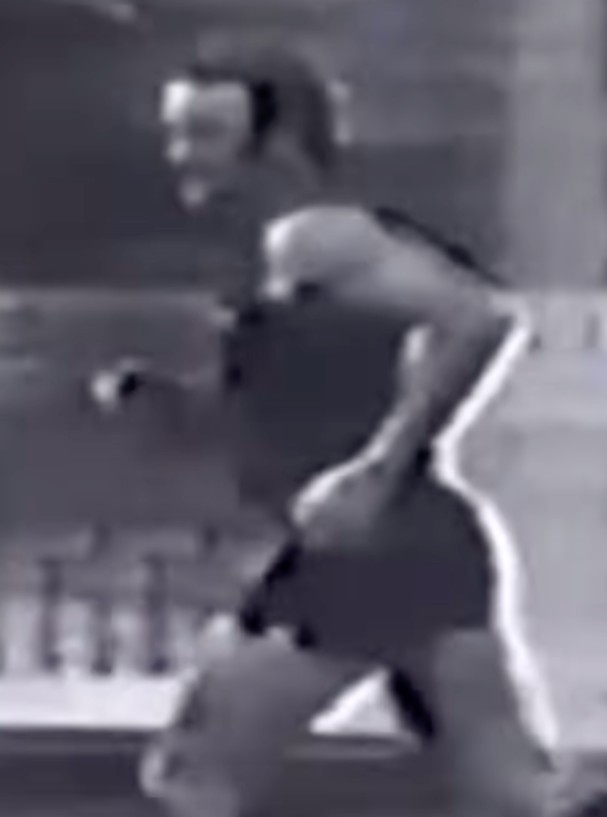
- Miller playing for Dandenong in 1971

Personal information
- Full name: James Joseph Miller
- Nickname: Frosty
- Born: 3 May 1944 (age 82); West Gippsland, Victoria
- Original team: Garfield
- Height: 183 cm (6 ft 0 in)
- Weight: 85 kg (187 lb)

Playing career^{1}
Years	Club	Games (Goals)
1964–1965	Carlton	11 (29)
1967–1977	Dandenong	183 (883)
- ^{1} Playing statistics correct to the end of 1977.

James Joseph "Frosty" Miller (born 3 May 1944) is a former Australian rules footballer who played for Carlton in the Victorian Football League (VFL) and had a noted career with Dandenong in the Victorian Football Association (VFA).

Recruited from the small town of Garfield, Miller won the 1963 West Gippsland Football League goalkicking award with 121 goals. Miller, a full-forward, started his career at Carlton and showed glimpses of his prolific goalkicking in his two seasons, scoring five goals against Hawthorn in just his second game and managing a sequence of five, six and four goals during the 1964 season. Miller decided to leave Carlton midway in 1965 he returned to Garfield. In 1966 he set a West Gippsland league record of 148 goals.

He joined VFA club Dandenong in 1967 and soon became a valuable member of the team playing at full forward. He kicked 106 goals in 1969. He was a member of Dandenong's 1971 premiership team, remembered for a controversial free kick that he received before the opening siren of the Grand Final. The umpire, having seen Preston full-back Barrie Leslie push Miller in the back, awarded a free kick despite the start of play not having been signaled. Miller kicked the goal and four quarters later Dandenong won by six points. Preston lodged a protest after the game and it went to a VFA hearing, with the final decision from the committee going in Dandenong's favour 39 votes to five. Miller was also a member of Dandenong's victorious 1967 Grand Final team.

Miller was the leading goalkicker in the Association across the full season (including finals) six times over a seven-year span during his career: in 1968, 1969, 1970, 1971, 1973 and 1974. He was also the leading goalkicker in the home-and-away season on four of those occasions; he was second in 1971 and third in 1973, but passed those ahead of him during the finals. In 1973, he kicked his career high 108 goals. When he retired early in the 1977 season, he had amassed 883 goals at an average of 4.82 per game.

Miller became Captain-Coach of Berwick of the South West Gippsland Football League in 1977. In 1978 he kicked 201 goals for the season, the fourth man to achieve this feat. He stopped playing in 1981 after injuries hampered his last three seasons.

The Jim 'Frosty' Miller Medal, awarded to the leading goalkicking in the modern day VFL, is named in his honour. He is a full-forward in Dandenong's official 'Team of the Century'.
