= Kevin Sait =

Australian rules footballer

Personal information
- Born: 11 November 1956 (age 69)
- Original team: Yarraville
- Height: 168 cm (5 ft 6 in)
- Weight: 72 kg (159 lb)

Playing career^{1}
Years	Club	Games (Goals)
1981	Footscray	13 (18)
- ^{1} Playing statistics correct to the end of 1981.

Kevin Sait (born 11 November 1956) is a former Australian rules footballer who played with Footscray in the Victorian Football League (VFL).

Sait, a rover from Yarraville, was a star in the second division of the Victorian Football Association, where he won the Field Trophy, which was awarded to the best and fairest player in the second division, in 1980; he placed second for the same award in 1977, and third in 1979.

A former Richmond seconds player, Sait spent the 1981 VFL season at Footscray, where he made 13 senior appearances. On debut, against Essendon at Western Oval, Sait kicked two last quarter goals, to help secure an eight-point win. It would be one of only two wins that year for Footscray and the only time Sait didn't finish on a losing side. He averaged 21 disposals from his 13 games in 1981 and kicked 18 goals.

From 1982 to 1987, Sait played for Williamstown, back in the Victorian Football Association. He made 94 appearances for the club and was a member of their 1986 premiership team.
