= John Baird (Australian footballer) =

Australian rules footballer (born 1980)

Personal information
- Full name: John Baird
- Born: 11 June 1980 (age 46)
- Original team: Box Hill/Xavier College
- Height: 189 cm (6 ft 2 in)
- Weight: 80 kg (176 lb)

Playing career^{1}
Years	Club	Games (Goals)
2002–2005	Kangaroos	46 (7)
- ^{1} Playing statistics correct to the end of 2005.

John Baird (born 11 June 1980) is an Australian rules footballer who played with the Kangaroos in the Australian Football League (AFL).

Baird, a defender, was promoted from the Kangaroos rookie list to play 14 games with the club in the 2002 AFL season. The previous year he had played a big part in Box Hill winning their first top division Victorian Football League (VFL) premiership, with a Norm Goss Memorial Medal winning performance in the grand final.

A regular fixture in the Kangaroos side during the 2003 season, Baird played in the first 20 rounds and earned the only Brownlow vote of his career when he kept Nick Riewoldt goal-less at the MCG.

He spent much of the 2004 and 2005 playing with North Melbourne's then VFL-affiliate Port Melbourne. After being delisted at the end of 2005, Baird played for Port Adelaide in the 2006 SANFL season. He returned to Port Melbourne, which was by now a stand-alone VFL club not affiliated with any AFL club, in 2007 and two years later he was appointed club captain. In 2011 he captained Port Melbourne to the VFL premiership, and the team won all 21 games for the season, making it a perfect season.
