= Mark Fotheringham (Australian footballer) =

Australian rules footballer

Personal information
- Full name: Mark Fotheringham
- Original team: Aberfeldie
- Position: Full-forward

Playing career^{1}
Years	Club	Games (Goals)
1978–1981	Yarraville	73 (357)
1982–1987	Williamstown	101 (571)
Total		174 (928)
- ^{1} Playing statistics correct to the end of 1987.

Mark Fotheringham is a former Australian rules footballer who played with the Yarraville and Williamstown football clubs in the Victorian Football Association (VFA) in the 1970s and 1980s.

A full-forward originally from Aberfeldie in the Essendon District Football League (EDFL), Fotheringham played some reserves grade football in the Victorian Football League for Essendon in 1975, but never progressed to its senior team. He consequently returned to Aberfeldie, and played there until 1977.

In 1978, at age 21, Fotheringham signed to play for the Yarraville Football Club, then playing in the VFA's second division. He was an immediate success at the club, and in his first season became the first Yarraville forward to kick 100 goals in a season, and was the Division 2 leading goalkicker, with 105 goals. The following year, he kicked 129 goals to be the leading goalkicker in the home-and-away season, but finished second overall after the finals. He played two more years with Yarraville, finishing with a total of 357 goals for the club, and was club captain in 1981.

In 1982, Fotheringham left the ailing Yarraville club and sought a move to a Division 1 club; after attracting interest from all three western suburban Division 1 clubs (Coburg, Werribee and Williamstown), he joined Williamstown. He was the Division 1 leading goalkicker in back-to-back seasons in 1983 and 1984, kicking 108 goals and 114 goals respectively, and was two goals short of the title in 1985 with 106 goals. Fotheringham had kicked 98 goals in 1982. He kicked 14 goals in a match against Port Melbourne in 1986, and booted 13 goals on three occasions, against Werribee in 1983, Camberwell in 1983 and Prahran in 1984.

He served as club captain in 1983, after the sacking of captain-coach, Rod Oborne, and was vice-captain for the rest of his time at the VFA Seagulls. He won his only career VFA premiership with Williamstown in 1986 and played in the losing 1985 grand final. Fotheringham won the Club best and fairest trophy in 1982 and was awarded the most consistent player trophy also. He retired at age thirty after suffering a serious knee injury late in the 1987 season.

As of 2019, Fotheringham's career total of 928 goals places him fourth on the VFA/VFL's all-time goalkicking list. He averaged 5.3 goals per game throughout his career, and scored more than 100 goals in a season five times. He was named at full forward in the Williamstown Team of the Century and the 1980's Team of the Decade and was an inaugural inductee into the club's Hall of Fame in 2014.

After leaving Williamstown, Fotheringham served as coach of the Keilor Football Club in the EDFL. From 1992 until 1993, Fotheringham served as general manager of the Williamstown Football Club and also coached the Seconds team and was Seniors assistant coach in 1993.
