= Mordialloc Football Club =

Names
- Full name: Mordialloc Football Netball Club
- Nickname(s): Bloodhounds, Bloods

Club details
- Founded: 1891; 135 years ago
- Colours
- Competition: Southern Football Netball League
- President: Josh Dickerson
- Coach: Josh Jewell (Men's Football); Brad (Women's Football); Tahlia Cengia (Netball)
- Captain(s): Toby Plant (Men's Football) (Women's Football) (Netball) Premierships = FFL (7): 1923, 1924, 1929, 1939, 1950, 1951, 1952; VFA Div 2 (1): 1977; SFNL (3): 1999, 2014; SFNL (Netball) (1): 2018
- Ground: Ben Kavanagh Reserve (capacity: 2,500)

Uniforms
Home

The Mordialloc Football Club, nicknamed the Bloodhounds, is an Australian rules football and netball club that currently participates in the Southern Football Netball League (SFNL). The club formerly played in the Victorian Football Association (VFA) from 1958 until 1988.

== History ==
The club is based in the Melbourne suburb of Mordialloc and started out in the Federal Football Association. They played in the FFA from 1909 to 1957 and were premiers on seven occasions - 1923, 1924, 1929, 1939, 1950, 1951 & 1952. Since 1927, the club has played at Ben Kavanagh Reserve in McDonald St, Mordialloc, a ground which is notable for its long length & similar size playing area as the MCG. In 1958 they joined the Victorian Football Association. The club was initially allocated to Division 1 when the Association was first divided into two divisions, but was relegated to Division 2 after finishing last in 1962, and spent most of its remaining time in the Association in the lower division. Mordialloc lost the 1965 Grand Final to Preston and made another second division Grand Final in 1976 but lost again, this time to Williamstown. The following season the club broke through for their first VFA premiership with a 38-point win over Yarraville, under the leadership of captain-coach Geoff Rosenow. As a result of the premiership, Mordialloc was promoted to Division 1, but lasted only one season before being relegated.

Mordialloc's time in the VFA ended three matches into the 1988 season when they resigned due to poor onfield performances and the uncertain future of the VFA's second division. The club then joined the South East Suburban Football League (SESFL), which later became the Southern Football Netball League (SFNL), where it has played since. Since 2013, the has been officially known as the "Mordialloc Football Netball Club".

The club has won two Men's football second division SFNL premierships: in 1999 and 2014 and in 2018 won its first Netball Division 1 flag.

== Leagues ==
- Federal Football League (1909–57)
- Victorian Football Association (1958–88)
- Southern Football League (1988–present)

== Premierships ==
- Federal Football Association (7): 1923, 1924, 1929, 1939, 1950, 1951, 1952
- Victorian Football Association 2nd Division (1): 1977
- Southern Football League Netball (1): 2018 - Men's Football 2nd Division (2): 1999, 2014

== Notable players ==
- Garry Baker, won a Best and fairest at Melbourne
- Len Crane, played at Hawthorn and South Melbourne
- Wayne Judson, represented the VFL and played at St Kilda
- Geoff Rosenow, played at Geelong
- Barry Metcalfe, All-Australian
- Ian Egerton, played at Hawthorn Football Club
