= List of VFA/VFL records =

This is a list of records from the Victorian Football League (previously known as the Victorian Football Association) since its inception in 1877.

From 1961 until 1988, the VFA seniors were split into Division 1 and Division 2.

== Premierships ==
=== Division 1 ===
Titles	Club	Seasons
17	Port Melbourne	1897, 1901, 1922, 1940, 1941, 1947, 1953, 1964, 1966, 1974, 1976, 1977, 1980, 1981, 1982, 2011, 2017
14	Williamstown	1907, 1921, 1939, 1945, 1949, 1954, 1955, 1956, 1958, 1959, 1986, 1990, 2003, 2015
10	Sandringham	1946, 1962, 1985, 1992, 1994, 1997, 2000, 2004, 2005, 2006
9	Footscray	1898, 1899, 1900, 1908, 1913, 1919, 1920, 1923, 1924
7	Geelong	1878, 1879, 1880, 1882, 1883, 1884, 1886
6	Coburg	1926, 1927, 1928, 1979, 1988, 1989
6	Hotham/North Melbourne	1903, 1904, 1910, 1914, 1915, 1918
6	Oakleigh	1930, 1931, 1950, 1952, 1960, 1972
6	Springvale/Casey	1987, 1995, 1996, 1998, 1999, 2022
5	Prahran (II)	1937, 1951, 1970, 1973, 1978
5	South Melbourne	1881, 1885, 1888, 1889, 1890
5	Northcote	1929, 1932, 1933, 1934, 1936
4	Preston/Northern Bullants	1968, 1969, 1983, 1984
4	Essendon	1891, 1892, 1893, 1894
3	Brunswick	1909, 1925, 1938
3	Dandenong	1967, 1971, 1991
3	Box Hill	2001, 2013, 2018
3	North Ballarat	2008, 2009, 2010
3	Geelong reserves	2002, 2007, 2012
3	Footscray reserves	2014, 2016, 2025
2	Carlton	1877, 1887
2	Richmond	1902, 1905
2	Moorabbin (I)	1957, 1963
2	Yarraville	1935, 1961
2	Essendon A	1911, 1912
2	Werribee	1993, 2024
1	Gold Coast reserves	2023
1	Brighton	1948
1	Geelong West	1975
1	Fitzroy	1895
1	Collingwood	1896
1	West Melbourne	1906
1	Waverley	1965
1	Richmond reserves	2019

== Highest scores ==
=== Seniors ===
Rank	Score	Club	Opponent	Year	Rd	Venue	Ref
1	55.17 (347)	Williamstown	Camberwell	1986	16	Camberwell Sports Ground	
2	52.31 (343)	Waverley	Sunshine	1981 (D2)	1	Central Reserve	
–	53.15 (333)	Brunswick	Sunshine	1989 (Note: Sunshine dropped out of the VFA during the 1989 season, and their games were deleted from the records.)	1	Gillon Oval	
–	49.21 (315)	Preston	Sunshine	1989	5	Skinner Reserve	
3	48.21 (309)	Springvale	Sunshine	1983 (D2)	18	Springvale Reserve	
4	46.31 (307)	Brunswick	Sunshine	1983 (D2)	12	Brunswick Park	
5	46.21 (297)	Coburg	Camberwell	1989	5	Camberwell Sports Ground	

==== VFL era only ====
Rank	Score	Club	Opponent	Year	Rd	Venue	Ref
1	35.17 (227)	Geelong reserves	Bendigo	2013	19	Queen Elizabeth Oval	
2	33.21 (219)	Richmond reserves	North Ballarat	2017	1	Punt Road Oval	
3	33.16 (214)	Footscray reserves	Bendigo	2014	4	Queen Elizabeth Oval	
4	33.13 (211)	Port Melbourne	Frankston	2015	19	North Port Oval	
5	30.27 (207)	Williamstown	Bendigo	2013	7	Williamstown Cricket Ground	

=== Former grades ===
The highest score in any VFA/VFL grade (and any Australian rules football game) was Williamstown's 110.27 (687) against Geelong West in a 1983 thirds (under-18s) match.

Rank	Score	Club	Opponent	Grade	Year	Rd	Venue	Ref
1	110.27 (687)	Williamstown	Geelong West	Thirds (D1)	1983	14	Williamstown Cricket Ground	
2	92.30 (582)	Frankston	Geelong West	Thirds	1987	1		
3	88.23 (551)	Coburg	Geelong West	Thirds (D1)	1983	13		
4	77.44 (506)	Brunswick	Geelong West	Thirds (D1)	1981	7		
5	74.31 (475)	Preston	Geelong West	Thirds (D1)	1981	4		

=== By venue ===
Venue	Score	Club	Opponent	Year	Rd	Ref
Bellerive Oval	31.14 (200)	Williamstown	Tasmania (I)	2008	16	
Box Hill City Oval	44.22 (286)	Box Hill	Sunshine	1983 (D2)	8	
Camberwell Sports Ground	55.17 (347)	Williamstown	Camberwell	1986	16	
Carrara Stadium	28.14 (182)	Gold Coast reserves	Geelong reserves	2023	2	
Casey Fields	28.13 (181)	Casey	Box Hill	2007	2	
Central Reserve	52.31 (343)	Waverley	Sunshine	1981 (D2)	1	
Chirnside Park	38.19 (247)	Werribee	Mordialloc	1987 (D2)	16	
Coburg City Oval	37.27 (249)	Coburg	Waverley	1983	14	
Docklands Stadium	29.9 (183)	Northern Blues	Frankston	2015	11	
Fankhauser Reserve	30.15 (195)	Southport	Frankston	2024	EF	
Gillon Oval	53.15 (333)	Brunswick	Sunshine	1989	1	
Gillon Oval	46.31 (307)	Brunswick	Sunshine	1983 (D2)	12	
North Port Oval	43.29 (287)	Port Melbourne	Sandringham	1941	19	
Preston City Oval	43.12 (270)	Preston	Camberwell	1989	8	
Queen Elizabeth Oval	35.17 (227)	Geelong reserves	Bendigo	2013	19	
Shepley Oval	44.29 (293)	Dandenong	Brunswick-Broadmeadows	1991 (Note: Brunswick-Broadmeadows withdrew during the 1991 season, and their games were expunged from the records.)	1	
Shepley Oval	40.17 (257)	Dandenong	Mordialloc	1987 (D2)	8	
Skinner Reserve	49.21 (315)	Preston	Sunshine	1989	5	
Skinner Reserve	36.20 (236)	Sunshine	Camberwell	1969 (D2)	4	
Springvale Reserve	48.21 (309)	Springvale	Sunshine	1983 (D2)	18	
Traralgon Reserve	28.13 (181)	Springvale	Traralgon	1997	11	
Trevor Barker Beach Oval	37.26 (248)	Sandringham	Camberwell	1990	18	
Warrawee Park	40.22 (262)	Oakleigh	Sunshine	1982 (D2)	6	
Warrawee Park	40.22 (262)	Oakleigh	Sunshine	1984 (D2)	6	
West Oval	37.27 (249)	Geelong West	Waverley	1983	8	
Williamstown Cricket Ground	38.24 (252)	Williamstown	Camberwell	1986	7	
York Park	31.17 (203)	Sandringham	Tasmania (I)	2008	7	

== Lowest scores ==
Rank	Score	Club	Opponent	Year	Round	Venue
1	0.0 (0)	Footscray	Port Melbourne	1902	15	North Port Oval
2	0.1 (1)	Brunswick	Williamstown	1897	10	Brunswick Park
2	0.1 (1)	Brunswick	Footscray	1899	10	Western Oval
4	0.2 (2)	Brunswick	West Melbourne	1904	11	Arden Street
4	0.2 (2)	Port Melbourne	Prahran	1906	6	North Port Oval

All these scores were from the early years of the VFA competition, when scores, in general, were much lower. The following table shows the lowest scores since 1919 (the first year of complete competition following World War I):

Rank	Score	Club	Opponent	Year	Round	Venue
1	0.4 (4)	Northcote	North Melbourne	1919	15	Arden Street
1	0.4 (4)	Northern Bullants	Footscray reserves	2023	18	Preston City Oval
– (Note: A snap COVID-19 lockdown affecting south-eastern Queensland was announced on the morning of the VFL match between Gold Coast reserves and Southport, leading to the match being abandoned for no result after ten minutes of play.)	1.0 (6)	Southport	Gold Coast reserves	2021	16	Austworld Centre Oval
3	0.7 (7)	North Melbourne reserves	Casey	2018	14	Casey Fields
4	1.2 (8)	Brighton	Northcote	1961 (D2)	17	Northcote Park
4	1.2 (8)	Brighton	Preston	1961 (D2)	15	Preston City Oval
–	1.2 (8)	Gold Coast reserves	Southport	2021	16	Austworld Centre Oval

=== Lowest scores (seconds and thirds) ===
Rank	Score	Club	Opponent	Year	Grade	Round	Venue
1	0.0 (0)	Geelong West	Brunswick	1981	Thirds (D1)	7	
1	0.0 (0)	Caulfield	Box Hill	1986	Thirds (D2)	9	
2	0.0 (1)	Box Hill	Sunshine	1969	Thirds (D2)	7	

== Greatest winning margins ==
Rank	Margin	Team	Opponent	Year	Round	Ground
1	315	Williamstown	Camberwell	1986	16	Camberwell Sportsground
2	290	Waverley	Sunshine	1981 (D2)	1	Central Reserve
3	275	Brunswick	Sunshine	1983 (D2)	12	Brunswick Park
4	254	Box Hill	Sunshine	1984 (D2)	16	Box Hill City Oval
5	246	Brunswick	Kilsyth	1984 (D2)	18	Brunswick Park

== Individual records ==
=== Most career goals (seniors) ===
Rank	Goals	Games	Player	Club(s)	Career span
1	1336	300	Fred Cook	Yarraville, Port Melbourne, Moorabbin	1969–1985
2	1070	221	Rino Pretto	Coburg, Camberwell, Oakleigh, Dandenong	1980–1984
3	933	227	Bob Bonnett	Port Melbourne	1952–1963
4	928	174	Mark Fotheringham	Yarraville, Williamstown	1978–1987
5	883	183	Jim 'Frosty' Miller	Dandenong	1967–1977

=== Games ===
==== Most career games ====
Rank	Games	Player	Club(s)	Career span
1	306	Ben Jolley	Bendigo, Williamstown, Port Melbourne, Essendon reserves	2005–2023
2	302	Bill Swan	Port Melbourne, Williamstown	1976–1993
3	300	Fred Cook	Yarraville, Port Melbourne, Moorabbin	1969–1985
4	293	William 'Ching' Harris	Footscray	1896–1904, 1906–1915
5	277	John Benson	Sunshine, Werribee	1966–1984
Last updated: 25 September 2023

==== Most games for each club ====
Club	Games	Player	Career span	Ref
Berwick	29	Robert Trigg	1983–1987	
Box Hill	180	Jack Wright	1951–1960	
Brighton	184	George Stewart	1927–1937	
Brighton-Caulfield	26	Larry Rowe	1963–1964	
Brunswick	206	Henry Chase	1903–1910, 1912–1915, 1918–1920	
Camberwell	136	James Bohan	1947–1953	
Carlton	133	James Rickards	1877–1884	
Casey (Springvale)	233	Damian Carroll	1992–2004	
Caulfield	213	John Einsiedel	1974–1987	
Coburg	210	Dave Starbuck	1945–1956	
Dandenong	210	Lew Wright	1976–1988	
Footscray	293	William 'Ching' Harris	1896–1904, 1906–1915	
Frankston	203	Daniel Clarke	1996–2007	
Geelong (A)	80	Cyril Cations	1922–1927	
Geelong reserves	106	Jack Hollmer	2007–2015	
Geelong West	200	Warwick Yates	1974–1982	
Kilsyth	26	Stephen Letts	1982–1983	
Melbourne City	30	A.J. Daniels	1912–1913	
Moorabbin	217	Len Gilder	1951–1963	
Moorabbin	36	Graham Stewart	1983–1987	
Mordialloc	270	William Lang	1969–1983	
North Ballarat	209	Marc Greig	20??–20??	
North Melbourne	224	Charlie Hardy	1908–1921	
Northcote	201	Frank Seymour	1928–1938	
Oakleigh	203	Michael Owen	1981–1994	
Port Melbourne	229	Bob Bonnett	1952–1963	
Prahran	248	Frank Smith	1969–1983	
Preston (Northern Bullants) (Note: VFA/VFL records list Sid Hall as playing 200 games for Preston; however, 55 of these were for Northcote after the clubs amalgamated (with the merged entity considered a continuation of the Northcote Football Club).)	174	Frank Dowling	1931–1941	
Richmond	126	Alec Edmond	1899–1907	
Sandringham	202	Nick Sautner	1997–2000, 2004–2010	
Sunshine	148	John Benson	1966-1984	
Waverley	110	Jeff Costello	1973-1984	
Werribee	169	Robbie Castello	2004–2013	
West Melbourne	77	Harry Gregory	1902-1907	
Williamstown	233	Ben Jolley	2005–2023	
Yarraville	200	Ron Brown	1958–1973	

== Kicks after the siren ==
=== Goal to win ===
Player	Club	Opponent	Year	Rd	Final score	Details	Ref
Langley	Carlton	North Melbourne	1895	9	2 d. 1	Marked on the final bell and scored from 40 yards out.	
Wally Cook	Camberwell	Sandringham	1952	3	11.10 (76) d. 11.9 (75)	Cook was awarded a free kick after an errant kick by Sandringham full-back Murray Guille went out of bounds without being touched. Siren went while he prepared to kick, and a 60-yard torpedo snuck through to give Camberwell victory.	
Jack Whallis	Yarraville	Williamstown	1956	7	10.17 (77) d. 11.10 (76)	Whallis kicked a goal after the final siren from 35 yards out.	
Alex Andjelkovic	Geelong West	Caulfield	1972 (D2)	SF	17.18 (120) d. 17.13 (115)	Andjelkovic, who had come on in the final quarter as the 17th man, marked 25–35 yards from goal with seconds remaining; he stubbed the ground while kicking, but the kick just went through for a goal. It was Geelong West's 21st consecutive win, as part of a perfect season, qualifying it for the grand final.	
Chris Rourke	Camberwell	Preston	1982	2	18.15 (123) d. 18.11 (119)		
Chris Rourke	Frankston	Prahran	1989	1	18.13 (121) d. 17.17 (119)		
Anthony Cardamone	Preston	Williamstown	1992	2	22.5 (137) d. 20.14 (134)	Cardamone – who had been brought into the team as an emergency and had spent the first half of the game on the bench – kicked truly from 25 metres out.	
Jack Aziz	Werribee	Springvale	1993	PF	14.14 (98) d. 14.11 (95)	Aziz kicked the match-winning goal on the final siren with a set shot from 50 metres; it qualified Werribee for the grand final.	
Jarrad Grant	Williamstown	Coburg	2009	13	19.5 (119) d. 18.8 (116)	Marked on the siren and kicked truly from inside Williamstown's forward 50.	
Luke Reynolds	Northern Blues	Frankston	2014	2	15.12 (102) d. 15.9 (99)	Reynolds was awarded a free kick 25 metres from goal on a slight angle and kicked truly after the siren.	
Jean-Luc Velissaris	Northern Blues	Port Melbourne	2019	15	10.12 (72) d. 10.8 (68)	Velissaris was awarded a free kick for holding the ball with seconds remaining; kicked the goal from 30 metres out after the siren.	
Jacob Bauer	Richmond reserves	Greater Western Sydney reserves	2023	11	10.22 (82) d. 12.8 (80)	Bauer marked 10 metres out, almost directly in front, and kicked truly.	
Jacob Bauer	Richmond reserves	Brisbane reserves	2023	15	8.11 (59) d. 7.16 (58)	Bauer converted a set shot from 35 metres out on a slight angle; it was his second goal after the siren during the 2023 season.	
Jack Toner	Williamstown	Coburg	2024	2	12.11 (83) d. 11.11 (77)	Converted a set shot from 30 metres out; had Coburg won it would have ended a losing streak that begun in 2022.	
Joel Garner	Richmond reserves	Sandringham	2025	2	11.14 (80) d. 11.8 (74)	Converted a set shot from 35 metres out.	
Blake O'Leary	Frankston	Coburg	2025	7	12.13 (85) d. 13.6 (84)	Frankston was awarded a holding the ball free kick in the final seconds of the match, resulting in O'Leary kicking truly after the siren.	
Charlie West	Collingwood reserves	Sandringham	2025	13	14.9 (93) d. 14.6 (90)	Converted a set shot from 35 metres out.	
Tobyn Murray	Geelong reserves	North Melbourne reserves	2025	18	16.8 (104) d. 15.12 (102)	Murray was awarded a free kick in the final seconds of the match, followed by a 50-metre penalty, giving him a shot on the goal line where he kicked truly.	
Bodie Ryan	Box Hill	Brisbane reserves	2025	SF	18.7 (115) d. 16.16 (112)	After being kept scoreless in the third quarter, Box Hill kicked nine goals in the fourth quarter, with Ryan kicking a goal after the final siren to win the match.	

=== Goal to draw ===
Player	Team	Opponent	Year	Score	Details
Doulton Langlands	Sandringham	Coburg	2018	79–79	
Jack Carroll	Sandringham	Gold Coast	2025	72–72	

=== Behind to win ===
Player	Team	Opponent	Year	Score	Details
Anthony McDonald-Tipungwuti	Essendon	Gold Coast	2023	77–76	
Fergus McFadyen	Brisbane	Collingwood	2025	107–106	

=== Missed opportunities ===
Player	Team	Opponent	Year	Score	Outcome	Details
Dave McNamara	Essendon A	Brunswick	1911	63–65	A goal would have won the premiership for Essendon; the loss forced a Grand Final the following week.	
Ben Lennon	Richmond reserves	Port Melbourne	2017	70–74	Richmond would have won the 2017 VFL premiership.	
Max Williams	Frankston	Greater Western Sydney reserves	2023	54–55	A goal would have won the game for Frankston by 5 points.	

== Wooden spoons ==
=== Criteria ===
The premiership-eligible team which finishes with the worst record across the completed season is awarded the wooden spoon. Although the league was established in 1877, wooden spoons can only properly be allocated starting from the 1888 season, as this was the first time all teams below the top three placegetters were formally ranked from best to worst.

This is determined by fewest premiership points, with four points for a win and two points for a draw – except from 1888 to 1893 and 2021, when teams played an unequal number of matches and a ratio-adjusted number of premiership points was used. From the 1903 season onwards, percentage (ratio of points scored to points conceded) was used as tie-breaker.

Between 1961 and 1988, the VFA operated in two tiered divisions. During this time, with the exception of 1982 due to a temporary change in rules, the wooden spooner of Division 1 would be relegated to Division 2 for the subsequent season.

=== By season ===
==== Division 1 ====
Season	Wooden Spoon	Wins	Losses	Draws	Percentage	Points
1888	Melbourne (Note: 1888: Melbourne had the lowest record among premiership eligible clubs. Two clubs – Ballarat Imperial (2–11–1) and University (0–14–1) – had poorer records but did not play the eighteen matches required to be premiership eligible in that season.) (1)	4	14	1		20.8 (adj.)
1889	Footscray (1)	1	15	0		5.3 (adj.)
1890	Williamstown (1)	2	14	2		13.3 (adj.)
1891	Richmond (1)	2	14	3		16.2 (adj.)
1892 (tied)	Collingwood (1)	3	14	1		16.3 (adj.)
1892 (tied)	Williamstown (2)	3	14	1		16.3 (adj.)
1893	North Melbourne (1)	3	17	0		12.6 (adj.)
1894	Carlton (1)	2	16	0		8
1895	St Kilda (1)	3	13	2		16
1896 (tied)	Carlton (2)	2	14	2		12
1896 (tied)	Richmond (2)	3	15	0		12
1897	Richmond (3)	2	17	1		10
1898	Brunswick (1)	0	15	0		0
1899	Brunswick (2)	3	18	0		12
1900	West Melbourne (1)	1	15	0		4
1901	West Melbourne (2)	1	15	0		4
1902	Brunswick (3)	2	14	0		8
1903	Essendon Town (1)	0	18	0	27.1	0
1904	Preston (1)	0	18	0	33.2	0
1905	Preston (2)	1	17	0	36.1	4
1906	Essendon (A.) (2)	1	17	0	45.6	4
1907	Preston (3)	1	17	0	44.1	4
1908	Northcote (1)	3	14	1	51.0	14
1909	Port Melbourne (1)	2	16	0	52.2	8
1910	Preston (4)	0	18	0	27.3	0
1911	Preston (5)	1	17	0	37.5	4
1912	Melbourne City (1)	0	18	0	40.8	0
1913	Melbourne City (2)	0	18	0	43.8	0
1914	Northcote (2)	1	17	0	48.0	4
1915	Hawthorn (1)	1	12	0	58.9	4
1916	Season not contested					
1917	Season not contested					
1918	Footscray (2)	2	8	0	57.6	8
1919	Essendon (A.) (3)	3	15	0	63.4	12
1920	Brighton (1)	1	17	0	61.4	4
1921	Brighton (2)	1	16	1	45.6	6
1922	Prahran (1)	1	17	0	45.7	4
1923	Geelong (A.) (1)	2	16	0	59.2	8
1924	Prahran (2)	2	16	0	43.9	8
1925	Geelong (A.) (2)	1	13	0	59.5	4
1926	Williamstown (3)	4	14	0	60.0	16
1927	Geelong (A.) (3)	1	17	0	55.4	4
1928	Prahran (3)	3	15	0	63.6	12
1929	Sandringham (1)	1	21	0	47.7	4
1930	Sandringham (2)	1	17	0	63.1	4
1931	Camberwell (1)	2	16	0	67.1	8
1932	Oakleigh (1)	3	17	0	78.4	12
1933	Brunswick (4)	3	19	0	63.5	12
1934	Williamstown (4)	2	15	1	71.1	10
1935	Williamstown (5)	3	15	0	58.6	12
1936	Port Melbourne (2)	2	16	0	62.4	8
1937	Oakleigh (2)	4	12	0	77.8	16
1938	Williamstown (6)	2	14	0	70.7	8
1939	Oakleigh (3)	1	19	0	61.9	4
1940	Sandringham (3)	1	19	0	69.0	4
1941	Sandringham (4)	0	20	0	38.0	0
1942	Season not contested					
1943	Season not contested					
1944	Season not contested					
1945	Oakleigh (4)	2	18	0	51.9	8
1946	Prahran (4)	5	15	0	86.3	20
1947	Northcote (3)	4	18	0	76.4	16
1948	Yarraville (1)	4	16	0	77.5	16
1949	Yarraville (2)	2	19	0	72.7	8
1950	Yarraville (3)	2	17	0	72.9	8
1951	Box Hill (1)	0	19	1	48.0	2
1952	Brighton (3)	2	18	0	60.4	8
1953	Brighton (4)	2	18	0	55.6	8
1954	Sandringham (5)	1	19	0	41.4	4
1955	Brighton (5)	1	19	0	54.6	4
1956	Northcote (4)	4	16	0	77.7	16
1957	Brighton (6)	2	17	1	69.1	10
1958	Brighton (7)	2	16	0	55.7	8
1959	Camberwell (2)	1	19	0	39.1	4
1960	Prahran (5)	1	17	0	44.7	4
1961	Box Hill (2)	3	18	1	63.9	14
1962	Mordialloc (1)	1	17	0	65.2	4
1963	Northcote (5)	2	16	0	52.9	8
1964	Preston (6)	3	14	1	85.3	14
1965	Geelong West (1)	3	15	0	64.0	12
1966	Oakleigh (5)	2	16	0	65.8	8
1967	Williamstown (7)	2	16	0	83.8	8
1968	Coburg (1)	2	16	0	64.9	8
1969	Brunswick (5)	3	15	0	68.8	12
1970	Yarraville (4)	1	17	0	68.2	4
1971	Geelong West (2)	6	12	0	87.2	24
1972	Waverley (1)	5	13	0	79.5	20
1973	Coburg (2)	5	12	2	95.8	24
1974	Sunshine (1)	3	15	0	77.9	12
1975	Williamstown (8)	4	14	0	75.4	16
1976	Oakleigh (6)	4	13	1	79.7	18
1977	Williamstown (9)	2	16	0	75.8	8
1978	Mordialloc (2)	3	15	0	74.8	12
1979	Brunswick (6)	4	14	0	85.1	16
1980	Camberwell (3)	4	14	0	81.4	16
1981	Brunswick (7)	3	15	0	66.1	12
1982	Waverley (2)	3	15	0	67.1	12
1983	Waverley (3)	0	18	0	45.1	0
1984	Dandenong (1)	1	17	0	49.7	4
1985	Werribee (1)	2	16	0	70.5	8
1986	Camberwell (4)	0	18	0	30.1	0
1987	Geelong West (3)	1	16 (Note: 1987: Geelong West's loss tally includes three forfeitures.)	1	61.2	6
1988	Prahran (6)	5	13	0	70.2	20
1989	Camberwell (Note: 1989: Sunshine withdrew from the league in last place at midseason with a record of 0–8 and 31%. Its matches, including a loss against Camberwell, were expunged and Camberwell finished last and winless from remaining games.) (5)	0	18	0	40.5	0
1990	Camberwell (6)	0	18	0	44.2	0
1991	Oakleigh (Note: 1991: Brunswick-Broadmeadows withdrew from the league in last place early in the year with a record of 0–3 and 30%. Its matches were expunged.) (7)	2	16	0	52.4	8
1992	Oakleigh (8)	1	17	0	43.1	4
1993	Coburg (3)	0	18	0	47.2	0
1994	Prahran (7)	3	15	0	63.4	12
1995	Williamstown (10)	0	16	0	48.1	0
1996	Traralgon (1)	1	17	0	59.5	4
1997	Coburg (4)	1	17	0	46.1	4
1998	Coburg (5)	2	16	0	52.2	8
1999	Bendigo (1)	2	16	0	62.0	8
2000	Bendigo (2)	1	18	0	54.5	4
2001	Bendigo (3)	0	20	0	50.2	0
2002	Bendigo (4)	0	19	1	49.6	2
2003	North Ballarat (1)	4	14	0	66.8	16
2004	Springvale (1)	3	15	0	68.7	12
2005	Geelong reserves (1)	4	14	0	71.2	16
2006	Port Melbourne (3)	3	15	0	66.9	12
2007	Tasmania (1)	2	16	0	61.1	8
2008	Tasmania (2)	4	12	0	68.0	16
2009	Bendigo (5)	0	18	0	54.0	0
2010	Frankston (1)	1	17	0	48.1	4
2011	Frankston (2)	2	16	0	54.5	8
2012	Frankston (3)	2	15	1	69.2	10
2013	Bendigo (6)	0	10	0	34.4	0
2014	Bendigo (7)	0	18	0	45.9	0
2015	Frankston (4)	0	18	0	43.7	0
2016	Frankston (5)	2	16	0	61.9	8
2017	North Ballarat (2)	1	17	0	53.6	4
2018	Coburg (6)	1	16	1	57.1	6
2019	Frankston (6)	1	17	0	57.5	4
2020	Season not contested					
2021	Aspley (1)	1	9	0	73.0	10.0 (M/R)
2022	Northern Bullants (7)	1	17	0	53.2	4
2023	Coburg (7)	0	18	0	55.8	0
2024	Northern Bullants (8)	2	16	0	62.8	8
2025	Northern Bullants (9)	2	16	0	47.9	8
2026	Gold Coast reserves (1)	3	15	0	68.9	12

Source where unlisted

==== Division 2 ====
Season	Wooden Spoon	Wins	Losses	Draws	Percentage	Points
1961	Brighton (1)	0	18	0	29.0	0
1962	Brighton-Caulfield (2)	1	15	0	52.4	4
1963	Brighton-Caulfield (3)	3	13	0	60.1	12
1964	Box Hill (1)	4	14	0	85.2	16
1965	Caulfield (1)	2	13	1	66.5	10
1966	Werribee (1)	2	15	1	68.5	10
1967	Camberwell (1)	3	15	0	68.6	12
1968	Box Hill (2)	3	14	0	75.4	12
1969	Camberwell (2)	1	16	1	68.8	6
1970	Camberwell (3)	2	16	0	63.8	8
1971	Werribee (2)	3	15	0	64.0	12
1972	Werribee (3)	3	14	1	73.5	12
1973	Box Hill (3)	0	18	0	57.4	0
1974	Yarraville (1)	3	15	0	78.7	12
1975	Box Hill (4)	1	17	0	70.7	4
1976	Yarraville (2)	1	17	0	52.6	4
1977	Box Hill (5)	0	18	0	50.1	0
1978	Box Hill (6)	1	16	1	62.8	6
1979	Werribee (4)	2	16	0	61.6	8
1980	Box Hill (7)	1	17	0	58.5	4
1981	Sunshine (1)	0	18	0	34.0	0
1982	Yarraville (3)	1	17	0	52.4	4
1983	Yarraville (4)	1	17	0	38.1	4
1984	Sunshine (2)	2 (Note: 1984: Sunshine's win tally includes one with by forfeit following Yarraville's withdrawal from the competition.)	16	0	43.6	8
1985	Mordialloc (1)	3	15	0	62.9	12
1986	Mordialloc (2)	0	18	0	34.0	0
1987	Northcote (1)	3	15 (Note: 1987: Moorabbin withdrew from the league in last place early in the year with a record of 0–2 and 52%. Its remaining matches were forfeited.)	0	59.2	12
1988	Camberwell (4) (Note: 1988: Mordialloc withdrew from the league in last place early in the year with a record of 0–3 and a very low percentage. Its matches were expunged.)	6	12	0	84.9	24

=== By club ===
Club	Years in competition	Div 1	Div 2	Total
Williamstown	1884–pres	10	0	10
Brighton/ Brighton-Caulfield	1908–1964	7	3	10
Camberwell	1926–1990	6	4	10
Preston/Northern	1903–1911; 1926–2025	9	0	9
Box Hill	1951–pres	2	7	9
Oakleigh	1929–1994	8	0	8
Yarraville	1928–1983	4	4	8
Brunswick	1897–1991	7	0	7
Prahran	1899–1994	7	0	7
Bendigo	1998–2014	7	–	7
Coburg	1925–pres	7	0	6
Frankston	1966–pres	6	0	7
Northcote	1908–1987	5	1	6
Sandringham	1929–pres	5	–	5
Werribee	1965–pres	1	4	5
Mordialloc	1958–1988	2	2	4
Richmond	1885–1907	3	–	3
Essendon (A.)	1900–1921	3	–	3
Geelong (A.)	1922–1927	3	–	3
Waverley	1961–1987	3	0	3
Geelong West	1963–1988	3	0	3
Port Melbourne	1886–pres	3	–	3
Sunshine	1959–1988	1	2	3
Carlton	1877–1896	2	–	2
West Melbourne	1899–1907	2	–	2
Melbourne City	1912–1913	2	–	2
Footscray	1886–1924	2	–	2
Tasmania	2001–2008	2	–	2
North Ballarat	1996–2017	2	–	2
Melbourne	1877–1896	1	–	1
Collingwood	1892–1896	1	–	1
St Kilda	1886–1896	1	–	1
Hawthorn	1914–1924	1	–	1
Dandenong	1958–1994	1	0	1
Springvale/Casey	1982–pres	1	0	1
Traralgon	1996–1997	1	–	1
Gold Coast reserves	2021–pres	1	–	1
Geelong reserves	2000–pres	1	–	1
Aspley	2021	1	–	1
Caulfield	1965–1987	0	1	1
