= 1989 VFA season =

108th season of the Victorian Football Association

Overview
- Date: 9 April – 24 September 1989
- Teams: 15 (14 from round 10 onwards)
- Premiers: Coburg; 6th premiership
- Minor premiers: Coburg; 8th minor premiership
- J. J. Liston Trophy: Saade Ghazi (Williamstown – 22 votes)
- Leading goalkicker: Ian Rickman (Williamstown – 125 goals)

Attendance
- Matches played: 132
- Highest (finals): 23,272 (D1 Grand Final, Coburg vs Williamstown)

The 1989 VFA season was the 108th season of the Victorian Football Association (VFA), an Australian rules football competition played in the state of Victoria. The season began on 9 April and concluded on 24 September, comprising an 18-match home-and-away season over 20 rounds, followed by a four-week finals series.

Coburg won the premiership for the second year in a row and the sixth time overall, defeating Williamstown by 20 points in the 1989 VFA Grand Final. As of 2025, it is the last time Coburg has won a senior VFA/VFL premiership.

This was the first season since 1960 in which the VFA operated as a single-division competition, having operated as a two-division competition with promotion and relegation for the previous 28 years.

== Association membership and structure ==
=== End of Division 2 and withdrawal of Geelong West ===
After several years of speculation, the Association's second division was dissolved for the 1989 season and competition was re-combined into a single division, ending 28 years of partitioned competition. The future of Division 2 had been uncertain for most of the 1980s, and both the temporary competition restructures of 1982, and the proposals of the FORT review of December 1986 had sought to remove promotion and relegation between the divisions because the gap in both on-field performances and off-field viability between the strongest and weakest teams had widened. Talk of the imminent demise of Division 2 began following the folding of Waverley in March 1988, at which point the size of the Association had reduced to 17 teams; Mordialloc's withdrawal a month later reduced the size to sixteen. By the end of the year, president Brook Andersen confirmed that the 1989 season would operate as a single division; and, that while his preference was for a twelve- or fourteen-team competition, all sixteen teams would be given the opportunity to justify their positions in the competition.

The only club to withdraw between the end of 1988 and the beginning of 1989 was Geelong West. The club was heavily in debt, in large part because population growth had boosted the popularity of the Geelong Football League above that of the Association in Geelong, and it was unable to secure the $50,000 in sponsorship it needed to remain viable; and, throughout the 1980s it had been unable to field a competitive Thirds team due to difficulties in attracting juniors players willing to play in Melbourne every second week, rather than in the local Geelong competitions. The club decided that it needed to return to the local competition, where operating costs were lower, and where it would attract stronger support by performing at a more competitive level, and it formally withdrew from the Association on 27 October. The club was not permitted to join the GFL in its own right due to its proximity to the existing St Peters Football Club, but St Peters saw its own long-term viability as uncertain, so was willing to enter a merger. The resultant club was known as the Geelong West St Peters Football Club.

Consequently, the size of the Association was reduced to fifteen teams, the smallest since 1957. With fifteen clubs in one division, the Association introduced the McIntyre final five system to replace the Page–McIntyre final four system.

=== Uncompetitiveness of former Division 2 clubs and the withdrawal of Sunshine ===
During the two-division era, the Division 2 premiers had usually struggled to be competitive in their first season in the Division 1; so, in 1989, it was an unprecedented challenge for clubs who were already weak in Division 2 to adapt to playing former top division clubs in the single-division competition. The top two from the 1988 home-and-away season, Oakleigh and Werribee, were reasonably competitive, finishing with records of 8–10; but the other three clubs, Dandenong, Camberwell and Sunshine, were completely uncompetitive, and quickly risked causing embarrassment to the Association. The Association board of management began discussing plans to reduce the size of the Association to twelve teams, but the board needed a two-thirds majority in a vote of club delegates to gain the power to set the number of clubs in the competition, and the vote was only 7–8 in favour of granting the powers.

The weakest club was Sunshine. The step up from Division 2 to the combined division was too great for it to manage, and after eight games, it was winless with a percentage of 31, and had twice conceded scores in excess of 300 points. On 8 June, Sunshine announced its withdrawal from the seniors and reserves competitions for the rest of the season. It intended to use the remainder of the season to regroup, secure local sponsorships, and target strong Footscray District Football League players and fringe Footscray Football Club League players to recruit a competitive playing list for the 1990 season. The club granted unconditional clearances to its players, hoping they would return to the club in 1990; and it continued to field an Under-19s team for the rest of the season, against the protests of some teams. The eight games Sunshine had played were expunged from the records, and the rest of the senior and reserves fixture was redrawn to give all teams an equal number of games. At the end of the year, Sunshine was confident that it had rebuilt itself to be a viable and competitive club; but the Association disagreed and terminated its licence permanently at the end of the season.

Camberwell and Dandenong were a little more competitive than Sunshine. Camberwell defeated Sunshine, but since that game was expunged from the records, the club went on to officially finish the season winless in all three grades; its seniors conceded more than 200 points in each of its first six games of the season (excluding the game against Sunshine) and eight times overall. Dandenong's sole win for the season came against Camberwell, and it conceded 200 points six times during the year.

== Home-and-away season ==
In the home-and-away season, each team played eighteen games over 20 rounds. The fixture after Round 9 was redrawn following the withdrawal of Sunshine from the senior and reserves competition (the under-19s fixture was unchanged). The top five then contested the finals under the McIntyre final five system. The primary finals venue was North Port Oval, and the grand final was played at Windy Hill.

=== Round 1 ===
	Round 1
Sunday, 9 April (2:10 pm)	Dandenong 7.8 (50)	def. by	Springvale 32.25 (217)	Shepley Oval
Sunday, 9 April (2:10 pm)	Oakleigh 17.12 (114)	def. by	Williamstown 30.17 (197)	Warrawee Park
Sunday, 9 April (2:10 pm)	Port Melbourne 10.6 (66)	def. by	Coburg 25.17 (167)	North Port Oval
Sunday, 9 April (2:10 pm)	Prahran 18.11 (119)	def. by	Frankston 18.15 (123)	Toorak Park
Sunday, 9 April (2:10 pm)	Preston 16.14 (110)	def. by	Box Hill 22.7 (139)	Preston City Oval
Sunday, 9 April (2:10 pm)	Sandringham 16.15 (111)	def. by	Werribee 26.17 (173)	Beach Road Oval
Sunday, 9 April (2:10 pm) (result expunged)	Brunswick 53.15 (333)	def.	Sunshine 12.6 (78)	Gillon Oval
	Bye; Camberwell
Frankston captain Glenn Brown kicked a goal after the final siren to defeat Prahran.; Prior to the result being expunged, 53.15 (333) was Brunswick's highest-ever score, surpassing the record of 46.31 (307) it had set in the 1983 Division 2 season (also against Sunshine).

=== Round 2 ===
	Round 2
Sunday, 16 April (2:10 pm)	Coburg 27.19 (181)	def.	Sandringham 13.10 (88)	Coburg City Oval
Sunday, 16 April (2:10 pm)	Box Hill 20.22 (142)	def.	Dandenong 17.14 (116)	Box Hill City Oval
Sunday, 16 April (2:10 pm)	Frankston 32.19 (211)	def.	Camberwell 11.9 (85)	Frankston Park
Sunday, 16 April (2:10 pm)	Williamstown 17.13 (115)	def.	Preston 8.10 (58)	Williamstown Cricket Ground
Sunday, 16 April (2:10 pm)	Brunswick 19.17 (131)	def.	Oakleigh 13.15 (93)	Gillon Oval
Sunday, 16 April (2:10 pm)	Werribee 19.12 (126)	def. by	Port Melbourne 19.18 (132)	Chirnside Park
Sunday, 16 April (2:10 pm)	Springvale 31.19 (205)	def.	Prahran 12.9 (81)	Springvale Reserve
	Bye; Sunshine

=== Round 3 ===
	Round 3
Sunday, 23 April (2:10 pm)	Oakleigh 16.11 (117)	def. by	Coburg 23.20 (158)	Warrawee Park (crowd: 5,000)
Sunday, 23 April (2:10 pm)	Dandenong 10.10 (70)	def. by	Werribee 25.29 (179)	Shepley Oval (crowd: 1,000)
Sunday, 23 April (2:10 pm)	Preston 13.13 (91)	def. by	Springvale 24.18 (162)	Preston City Oval (crowd: 2,400)
Sunday, 23 April (2:10 pm)	Port Melbourne 18.18 (126)	def. by	Box Hill 19.14 (128)	North Port Oval
Sunday, 23 April (2:10 pm)	Sandringham 7.15 (57)	def. by	Williamstown 28.16 (184)	Beach Road Oval (crowd: 4,500)
Sunday, 23 April (2:10 pm)	Prahran 18.15 (123)	def. by	Brunswick 24.18 (162)	Toorak Park (crowd: 3,000)
Sunday, 23 April (2:10 pm) (result expunged)	Camberwell 27.14 (176)	def.	Sunshine 18.17 (125)	Camberwell Sports Ground (crowd: 2,000)
	Bye; Frankston
Sunshine led Camberwell by 45 points midway through the third quarter before Camberwell scored the final eighteen goals of the game to win by 51 points.

=== Round 4 ===
	Round 4
Sunday, 30 April (2:10 pm)	Brunswick 28.20 (188)	def.	Sandringham 17.15 (117)	Gillon Oval (crowd: 3,500)
Sunday, 30 April (2:10 pm)	Werribee 34.14 (218)	def.	Camberwell 18.9 (117)	Chirnside Park (crowd: 2,500)
Sunday, 30 April (2:10 pm)	Coburg 22.18 (150)	def.	Preston 7.16 (58)	Coburg City Oval (crowd: 2,500)
Sunday, 30 April (2:10 pm)	Port Melbourne 10.17 (77)	def. by	Springvale 19.20 (134)	North Port Oval (crowd: 2,000)
Sunday, 30 April (2:10 pm)	Box Hill 20.19 (139)	def.	Frankston 15.15 (105)	Box Hill City Oval
Sunday, 30 April (2:10 pm)	Williamstown 36.22 (238)	def.	Prahran 8.6 (54)	Williamstown Cricket Ground (crowd: 3,481)
Sunday, 30 April (2:10 pm) (result expunged)	Oakleigh 34.16 (220)	def.	Sunshine 19.12 (125)	Warrawee Park (crowd: 1,000)
	Bye; Dandenong

=== Round 5 ===
	Round 5
Sunday, 7 May (2:10 pm)	Springvale 17.14 (116)	def. by	Oakleigh 22.11 (143)	Springvale Reserve
Sunday, 7 May (2:10 pm)	Camberwell 8.9 (57)	def. by	Coburg 46.21 (297)	Camberwell Sports Ground
Sunday, 7 May (2:10 pm)	Werribee 25.19 (169)	def.	Prahran 9.15 (69)	Chirnside Park
Sunday, 7 May (2:10 pm)	Sandringham 18.14 (122)	def. by	Box Hill 19.15 (129)	Beach Road Oval
Sunday, 7 May (2:10 pm)	Dandenong 17.7 (109)	def. by	Frankston 33.25 (223)	Shepley Oval
Sunday, 7 May (2:10 pm)	Williamstown 27.13 (175)	def.	Port Melbourne 12.12 (84)	Williamstown Cricket Ground
Sunday, 7 May (2:10 pm) (result expunged)	Sunshine 9.5 (59)	def. by	Preston 49.21 (315)	Skinner Reserve
	Bye; Brunswick
Coburg's 46.21 (297) against Camberwell is the club's highest-ever score, and the 240-point margin is also the club's biggest win.; At half-time, Williamstown and Port Melbourne were tied at 8.7 (55) each, before Williamstown kicked 19 goals in the second half to win by 91 points.; Prior to the result being expunged, 49.21 (315) was Preston's highest-ever score, surpassing the record of 38.21 (249) it had set in the 1986 Division 1 season against Camberwell. The 256-point margin was also Preston's biggest win, surpassing the 204-point margin it had also set against Camberwell in 1986. Preston forward Jamie Shaw kicked a career-high 19 goals.

=== Round 6 ===
	Round 6
Saturday, 13 May (2:10 pm)	Brunswick 20.9 (129)	def. by	Coburg 18.25 (133)	Gillon Oval
Sunday, 14 May (2:10 pm)	Box Hill 31.26 (212)	def.	Camberwell 15.17 (107)	Box Hill City Oval
Sunday, 14 May (2:10 pm)	Oakleigh 27.13 (175)	def.	Werribee 16.16 (112)	Warrawee Park
Sunday, 14 May (2:10 pm)	Springvale 22.19 (151)	def.	Sandringham 16.12 (108)	Springvale Reserve
Sunday, 14 May (2:10 pm)	Frankston 9.14 (68)	def. by	Williamstown 24.17 (161)	Frankston Park
Sunday, 14 May (2:10 pm)	Prahran 30.23 (203)	def.	Dandenong 14.13 (97)	Toorak Park
Sunday, 14 May (2:10 pm) (result expunged)	Port Melbourne 20.16 (136)	def.	Sunshine 9.13 (67)	North Port Oval
	Bye; Preston

=== Round 7 ===
	Round 7
Sunday, 21 May (2:10 pm)	Williamstown 30.10 (190	def.	Werribee 10.12 (72)	Williamstown Cricket Ground (crowd: 4,832)
Sunday, 21 May (2:10 pm)	Dandenong 9.10 (64)	def. by	Brunswick 29.27 (201)	Shepley Oval (crowd: 1,000)
Sunday, 21 May (2:10 pm)	Port Melbourne 22.15 (147)	def.	Preston 14.13 (97)	North Port Oval (crowd: 1,500)
Sunday, 21 May (2:10 pm)	Coburg 13.19 (97)	def.	Frankston 10.15 (75)	Coburg City Oval (crowd: 1,800)
Sunday, 21 May (2:10 pm)	Sandringham 18.19 (127)	def. by	Oakleigh 26.12 (168)	Beach Road Oval (crowd: 3,000)
Sunday, 21 May (2:10 pm)	Camberwell 15.10 (100)	def. by	Prahran 31.15 (201)	Camberwell Sports Ground (crowd: 2,000)
Sunday, 21 May (2:10 pm) (result expunged)	Sunshine 2.12 (24)	def. by	Springvale 24.26 (170)	Skinner Reserve (crowd: 1,000)
	Bye; Box Hill

=== Round 8 ===
	Round 8
Sunday, 28 May (2:10 pm)	Werribee 14.18 (102)	def. by	Box Hill 19.19 (133)	Chirnside Park
Sunday, 28 May (2:10 pm)	Brunswick 25.17 (167)	def.	Port Melbourne 20.18 (138)	Gillon Oval
Sunday, 28 May (2:10 pm)	Preston 43.12 (270)	def.	Camberwell 13.14 (92)	Preston City Oval
Sunday, 28 May (2:10 pm)	Oakleigh 23.13 (151)	def.	Dandenong 13.11 (89)	Warrawee Park
Sunday, 28 May (2:10 pm)	Sandringham 20.16 (136)	def.	Prahran 18.18 (126)	Beach Road Oval
Sunday, 28 May (2:10 pm)	Coburg 13.14 (92)	def. by	Williamstown 24.14 (158)	Coburg City Oval
Sunday, 28 May (2:10 pm) (result expunged)	Frankston ?.? (233)	def.	Sunshine ?.? (65)	Frankston Park
	Bye; Springvale
With the result in its round 5 victory over Sunshine expunged, 43.12 (270) became Preston's highest-ever score.

=== Round 9 ===
	Round 9
Sunday, 4 June (2:10 pm)	Williamstown 25.16 (166)	def.	Camberwell 4.10 (34)	Williamstown Cricket Ground (crowd: 1,368)
Sunday, 4 June (2:10 pm)	Prahran 4.15 (39)	def. by	Coburg 19.15 (129)	Toorak Park (crowd: 2,200)
Sunday, 4 June (2:10 pm)	Port Melbourne 14.12 (96)	def.	Sandringham 13.8 (86)	North Port Oval (crowd: 2,000)
Sunday, 4 June (2:10 pm)	Oakleigh 11.17 (83)	def. by	Frankston 16.8 (104)	Warrawee Park (crowd: 1,000)
Sunday, 4 June (2:10 pm)	Dandenong 4.11 (35)	def. by	Preston 8.14 (62)	Shepley Oval (crowd: 700)
Sunday, 4 June (2:10 pm)	Springvale 24.17 (161)	def.	Brunswick 18.11 (119)	Springvale Reserve (crowd: 2,500)
Sunday, 4 June (2:10 pm) (result expunged)	Box Hill 30.26 (206)	def.	Sunshine 3.5 (23)	Box Hill City Oval (crowd: 1,325)
	Bye; Werribee
Although the result was expunged, this was Sunshine's last senior VFA game before the club withdrew from the 1989 season and subsequently folded.

=== Round 10 ===
	Round 10
Sunday, 18 June (2:10 pm)	Frankston 17.15 (117)	def.	Springvale 8.7 (57)	Frankston Park
Sunday, 18 June (2:10 pm)	Preston 7.9 (51)	def.	Werribee 6.12 (48)	Preston City Oval
Sunday, 18 June (2:10 pm)	Camberwell 7.4 (46)	def. by	Brunswick 15.18 (108)	Camberwell Sports Ground
Sunday, 18 June (2:10 pm)	Prahran 9.10 (64)	def.	Oakleigh 3.8 (26)	Toorak Park
Sunday, 18 June (2:10 pm)	Coburg 7.9 (51)	def.	Box Hill 5.8 (38)	Coburg City Oval
Sunday, 18 June (2:10 pm)	Dandenong 2.10 (22)	def. by	Port Melbourne 10.12 (72)	Shepley Oval
	Bye; Sandringham, Williamstown

=== Round 11 ===
	Round 11
Sunday, 25 June (2:10 pm)	Port Melbourne 10.13 (73)	def.	Prahran 6.6 (42)	North Port Oval
Sunday, 25 June (2:10 pm)	Camberwell 11.7 (73)	def. by	Dandenong 18.11 (119)	Camberwell Sports Ground
Sunday, 25 June (2:10 pm)	Sandringham 20.15 (135)	def.	Frankston 15.8 (98)	Beach Road Oval
Sunday, 25 June (2:10 pm)	Werribee 6.5 (41)	def. by	Springvale 13.10 (88)	Chirnside Park
Sunday, 25 June (2:10 pm)	Coburg 8.8 (56)	def.	Brunswick 8.3 (51)	Coburg City Oval
Sunday, 25 June (2:10 pm)	Oakleigh 14.9 (93)	def. by	Preston 18.11 (119)	Warrawee Park
Sunday, 25 June (2:10 pm)	Williamstown 13.12 (90)	drew with	Box Hill 14.6 (90)	Williamstown Cricket Ground

=== Round 12 ===
	Round 12
Sunday, 2 July (2:10 pm)	Box Hill 21.12 (138)	def.	Oakleigh 9.13 (67)	Box Hill City Oval
Sunday, 2 July (2:10 pm)	Brunswick 12.7 (79)	def.	Frankston 9.9 (63)	Gillon Oval
Sunday, 2 July (2:10 pm)	Port Melbourne 12.9 (81)	def. by	Williamstown 27.17 (179)	North Port Oval
Sunday, 2 July (2:10 pm)	Sandringham 26.25 (181)	def.	Camberwell 11.11 (77)	Beach Road Oval
Sunday, 2 July (2:10 pm)	Springvale 13.11 (89)	def.	Preston 6.7 (43)	Springvale Reserve
Sunday, 2 July (2:10 pm)	Werribee 16.10 (106)	def.	Dandenong 10.11 (71)	Chirnside Park
	Bye; Coburg, Prahran

=== Round 13 ===
	Round 13
Sunday, 9 July (2:10 pm)	Coburg 10.4 (64)	def.	Springvale 7.8 (50)	Coburg City Oval
Sunday, 9 July (2:10 pm)	Camberwell 16.14 (110)	def. by	Frankston 18.12 (120)	Camberwell Sports Ground
Sunday, 9 July (2:10 pm)	Box Hill 21.24 (150)	def.	Prahran 9.9 (63)	Box Hill City Oval
Sunday, 9 July (2:10 pm)	Preston 11.11 (77)	def.	Brunswick 8.9 (57)	Preston City Oval
	Bye; Dandenong, Oakleigh, Port Melbourne, Sandringham, Werribee, Williamstown

=== Round 14 ===
	Round 14
Sunday, 16 July (2:10 pm)	Brunswick 14.16 (100)	def. by	Box Hill 16.14 (110)	Gillon Oval
Sunday, 16 July (2:10 pm)	Dandenong 5.5 (35)	def. by	Coburg 22.15 (147)	Shepley Oval
Sunday, 16 July (2:10 pm)	Prahran 15.14 (104)	def. by	Preston 20.12 (132)	Toorak Park
Sunday, 16 July (2:10 pm)	Frankston 28.16 (184)	def.	Port Melbourne 20.15 (135)	Frankston Park
Sunday, 16 July (2:10 pm)	Werribee 27.13 (175)	def.	Sandringham 24.7 (151)	Chirnside Park
Sunday, 16 July (2:10 pm)	Camberwell 11.11 (77)	def. by	Oakleigh 23.19 (157)	Camberwell Sports Ground
Sunday, 16 July (2:10 pm)	Springvale 15.15 (105)	def.	Williamstown 14.14 (98)	Springvale Reserve

=== Round 15 ===
	Round 15
Sunday, 23 July (2:10 pm)	Preston 9.8 (62)	def. by	Frankston 10.6 (66)	Preston City Oval
Sunday, 23 July (2:10 pm)	Box Hill 18.20 (128)	def.	Springvale 13.12 (90)	Box Hill City Oval
Sunday, 23 July (2:10 pm)	Prahran 20.19 (139)	def.	Camberwell 11.14 (80)	Toorak Park
Sunday, 23 July (2:10 pm)	Sandringham 38.18 (246)	def.	Dandenong 13.15 (93)	Beach Road Oval
Sunday, 23 July (2:10 pm)	Oakleigh 12.9 (81)	def. by	Port Melbourne 22.15 (147)	Warrawee Park
Sunday, 23 July (2:10 pm)	Williamstown 6.8 (44)	def. by	Coburg 10.10 (70)	Williamstown Cricket Ground
Sunday, 23 July (2:10 pm)	Werribee 19.12 (126)	def.	Brunswick 12.18 (90)	Chirnside Park

=== Round 16 ===
	Round 16
Sunday, 30 July (2:10 pm)	Brunswick 18.12 (120)	def.	Williamstown 14.15 (99)	Gillon Oval
Sunday, 30 July (2:10 pm)	Oakleigh 13.11 (89)	def. by	Springvale 23.11 (139)	Warrawee Park
Sunday, 30 July (2:10 pm)	Port Melbourne 24.22 (122)	def.	Camberwell 12.8 (80)	North Port Oval
Sunday, 30 July (2:10 pm)	Frankston 19.12 (126)	def.	Werribee 17.17 (119)	Frankston Park
Sunday, 30 July (2:10 pm)	Sandringham 26.21 (177)	def.	Preston 19.15 (129(	Beach Road Oval
Sunday, 30 July (2:10 pm)	Dandenong 8.16 (64)	def. by	Box Hill 17.17 (119)	Shepley Oval
	Bye; Coburg, Prahran

=== Round 17 ===
	Round 17
Sunday, 6 August (2:10 pm)	Box Hill 15.23 (113)	def. by	Williamstown 24.14 (158)	Box Hill City Oval
Sunday, 6 August (2:10 pm)	Prahran 13.14 (92)	def. by	Sandringham 24.13 (157)	Toorak Park
Sunday, 6 August (2:10 pm)	Frankston 17.9 (111)	def.	Brunswick 15.9 (99)	Frankston Park
Sunday, 6 August (2:10 pm)	Preston 6.7 (43)	def.	Port Melbourne 5.6 (36)	Preston City Oval
Sunday, 6 August (2:10 pm)	Coburg 18.18 (126)	def.	Werribee 7.8 (50)	Coburg City Oval
Sunday, 6 August (2:10 pm)	Dandenong 7.9 (51)	def. by	Oakleigh 22.15 (147)	Shepley Oval
Sunday, 6 August (2:10 pm)	Springvale 25.15 (165)	def.	Camberwell 10.4 (64)	Springvale Reserve

=== Round 18 ===
	Round 18
Sunday, 13 August (2:10 pm)	Williamstown 31.14 (200)	def.	Dandenong 12.8 (80)	Williamstown Cricket Ground
Sunday, 13 August (2:10 pm)	Camberwell 6.11 (47)	def. by	Box Hill 31.19 (205)	Camberwell Sports Ground
Sunday, 13 August (2:10 pm)	Springvale 17.23 (125)	def.	Werribee 10.7 (67)	Springvale Reserve
Sunday, 13 August (2:10 pm)	Brunswick 6.11 (47)	def. by	Preston 13.14 (92)	Gillon Oval
Sunday, 13 August (2:10 pm)	Coburg 20.18 (138)	def.	Port Melbourne 7.14 (56)	Skinner Reserve
Sunday, 13 August (2:10 pm)	Oakleigh 23.12 (150)	def.	Sandringham 16.16 (112)	Warrawee Park
Sunday, 13 August (2:10 pm)	Frankston 23.14 (152)	def.	Prahran 8.11 (59)	Frankston Park
The Coburg v Port Melbourne match was moved to Sunshine's home ground, Skinner Reserve, after wet weather turned Coburg City Oval into a mudheap.

=== Round 19 ===
	Round 19
Saturday, 19 August (2:10 pm)	Box Hill 14.13 (97)	def. by	Coburg 15.9 (99)	North Port Oval
Sunday, 20 August (2:10 pm)	Werribee 14.7 (91)	def. by	Oakleigh 16.19 (115)	Chirnside Park
Sunday, 20 August (2:10 pm)	Sandringham 30.21 (201)	def.	Brunswick 23.12 (150)	Beach Road Oval
Sunday, 20 August (2:10 pm)	Springvale 16.14 (110)	def.	Frankston 12.13 (85)	Springvale Reserve
Sunday, 20 August (2:10 pm)	Preston 15.21 (111)	def.	Prahran 11.9 (75)	Preston City Oval
Sunday, 20 August (2:10 pm)	Camberwell 7.12 (54)	def. by	Williamstown 39.19 (253)	Camberwell Sports Ground
Sunday, 20 August (2:10 pm)	Port Melbourne 27.17 (179)	def.	Dandenong 21.8 (134)	North Port Oval

=== Round 20 ===
	Round 20
Sunday, 27 August (2:10 pm)	Camberwell 8.13 (61)	def. by	Werribee 22.16 (148)	Camberwell Sports Ground
Sunday, 27 August (2:10 pm)	Frankston 30.7 (187)	def.	Oakleigh 14.13 (97)	Frankston Park
Sunday, 27 August (2:10 pm)	Prahran 19.15 (129)	def. by	Port Melbourne 22.10 (142)	Toorak Park
Sunday, 27 August (2:10 pm)	Preston 8.14 (62)	def. by	Coburg 16.14 (110)	Preston City Oval
Sunday, 27 August (2:10 pm)	Box Hill 22.18 (150)	def.	Sandringham 14.15 (99)	Box Hill City Oval
Sunday, 27 August (2:10 pm)	Brunswick 21.16 (142)	def.	Dandenong 20.11 (131)	Gillon Oval
Sunday, 27 August (2:10 pm)	Williamstown 17.13 (115)	def.	Springvale 9.18 (72)	Williamstown Cricket Ground

== Ladder ==
Pos	Team	Pld	W	L	D	PF	PA	PP	Pts	Qualification
1	Coburg (P)	18	17	1	0	2271	1260	180.2	68	Finals series
2	Williamstown	18	14	3	1	2819	1716	164.3	58	Finals series
3	Box Hill	18	14	3	1	2360	1716	137.5	58	Finals series
4	Springvale	18	13	5	0	2244	1580	142.0	52	Finals series
5	Frankston	18	12	6	0	2218	1844	120.3	48	Finals series
6	Brunswick	18	9	9	0	2140	1941	110.3	36	
7	Preston	18	9	9	0	1667	1742	95.7	36	
8	Port Melbourne	18	9	9	0	1953	2112	92.5	36	
9	Werribee	18	8	10	0	2122	2001	106.0	32	
10	Oakleigh	18	8	10	0	2057	2169	94.8	32	
11	Sandringham	18	7	11	0	2411	2509	96.1	28	
12	Prahran	18	4	14	0	1782	2382	74.8	16	
13	Dandenong	18	1	17	0	1430	2815	50.8	4	
14	Camberwell	18	0	18	0	1351	3336	40.5	0	
–	Sunshine (W)	8	0	8	0	566	1785	31.7	0	

Rules for classification: 1) points; 2) percentage; 3) number of points for.
(P) Premiers; (W) Club withdrew, record expunged

=== Progression by round ===
Ladder positions until the end of round 9 reflect the ladder prior to Sunshine's withdrawal and its match results being expunged.

Numbers highlighted in green indicate that the team finished the round inside the top 5.
Numbers highlighted in blue indicates the team finished first on the ladder in that round.
Numbers highlighted in red indicates the team finished in last place on the ladder in that round.
Grey indicates that the team had withdrawn from the season.
Underlined numbers indicate that the team had a bye during that round.

Team ╲ Round	1	2	3	4	5	6	7	8	9	10	11	12	13	14	15	16	17	18	19	20
Coburg	4	8	12	16	20	24	28	28	32	36	40	40	44	48	52	52	56	60	64	68
Williamstown	4	8	12	16	20	24	28	32	36	36	38	42	42	42	42	42	46	50	54	58
Box Hill	4	8	12	16	20	24	24	28	32	28	30	34	38	42	46	50	50	54	54	58
Springvale	4	8	12	16	16	20	24	24	28	24	28	32	32	36	36	40	44	48	52	52
Frankston	4	4	4	8	8	12	12	16	20	20	20	20	24	28	32	36	40	44	44	48
Brunswick	4	8	12	16	16	16	20	24	24	24	24	28	28	28	28	32	32	32	32	36
Preston	0	0	0	0	4	4	4	8	12	12	16	20	20	24	24	24	28	32	36	36
Port Melbourne	0	4	4	4	4	8	12	12	16	16	20	20	20	20	24	28	28	28	32	36
Werribee	4	4	8	12	16	16	16	16	16	16	16	16	20	24	28	28	28	28	28	32
Oakleigh	0	0	0	4	8	12	16	20	20	16	16	16	16	20	20	20	24	28	32	32
Sandringham	0	0	0	0	0	0	0	4	4	4	8	12	12	12	16	20	24	24	28	28
Prahran	0	0	0	0	0	4	8	8	8	12	12	12	12	12	16	16	16	16	16	16
Dandenong	0	0	0	0	0	0	0	0	0	0	4	4	4	4	4	4	4	4	4	4
Camberwell	0	0	4	4	4	4	4	4	4	0	0	0	0	0	0	0	0	0	0	0
Sunshine	0	0	0	0	0	0	0	0	0	–	–	–	–	–	–	–	–	–	–	–

== Finals ==
=== Qualifying and elimination finals ===
	Qualifying final
Saturday, 2 September	Williamstown 14.15 (99)	def. by	Box Hill 17.9 (111)	North Port Oval (crowd: 7,231)

	Elimination Final
Sunday, 3 September	Springvale 23.11 (149)	def.	Frankston 16.9 (105)	Beach Road Oval

=== Semi-finals ===
	Second semi-final
Saturday, 9 September	Coburg 13.16 (94)	def.	Box Hill 7.10 (52)	North Port Oval (crowd: 3,020)

	First semi-final
Sunday, 10 September	Williamstown 18.11 (119)	def.	Springvale 6.11 (47)	North Port Oval (crowd: 4,150)

=== Preliminary final ===
	Preliminary final
Sunday, 17 September	Box Hill 17.12 (114)	def. by	Williamstown 19.15 (129)	North Port Oval (crowd: 8,431)

=== Grand Final ===
1989 VFA Grand Final
Sunday, 24 September (2:10 pm)	Coburg	def.	Williamstown	Windy Hill (crowd: 23,272)
3.2 (20); 5.6 (36); 8.10 (58); 10.13 (73)	Q1; Q2; Q3; Final	1.1 (7); 2.6 (18); 4.7 (31); 7.11 (53)	Umpires: Peter Cameron, Rowan Sawers; Norm Goss Memorial Medal: Tim Rieniets (Coburg)
Reynoldson 3, Allison 2, Doyle, Ingram, Kaakour, Langhan, Weatherald	Goals	Rickman 3, Aziz, Dimartino, Ghazi, Smith
Evans, Langhan, Nimmo	Reports

== Awards ==
- The leading goalkicker for the season was Ian Rickman (Williamstown), who kicked 125 goals during the season, including finals.
- The J. J. Liston Trophy was won by Saade Ghazi (Williamstown), who polled 22 votes in his first season in the Association. Robert Cunningham (Oakleigh) was second with 17 votes, and Robert Mace (Frankston) was third with 14 votes.
- The inaugural Fothergill–Round Medal was won by Chris Owen (Preston).
- Frankston won the second premiership. Frankston 17.16 (118) defeated Williamstown 11.14 (80) in the grand final, held as a curtain-raiser to the Seniors Grand Final on 24 September.

== Notable events ==
=== Interleague matches ===
In 1989, the Association competed in and won the NFL Shield, the NFL's interstate competition among the minor states, held in Tasmania over the Queen's Birthday weekend. Phil Cleary (Coburg) was coach of the Association team, and Brett McTaggart (Williamstown) was captain. Because Tasmania unexpectedly finished last in the qualifying matches, attendances and takings at later matches dropped, resulting in all six competing states losing $40,000 in expenses over the event. Rino Pretto (Oakleigh) kicked a VFA representative record of twelve goals in the grand final.

1989 NFL Shield

	Qualifying matches
Friday 9 June (4:15 pm)	V.F.A. 20.11 (131)	def.	New South Wales 5.6 (36)	West Park Oval, Burnie
Saturday 10 June (10:00 am)	V.F.A. 11.11 (77)	def.	Queensland 2.10 (22)	York Park, Launceston

	Grand final
Monday 12 June (2:00 pm)	V.F.A. 21.15 (141)	def.	Australian Amateurs 2.3 (15)	North Hobart Oval, Hobart

=== Other notable events ===
- In November 1988, the Association signed a new control agreement with the Victorian Football League, the first agreement between the competitions since the Association's expulsion from the Australian National Football Council in 1970. Under the agreement, the two bodies reciprocally recognised each other's clearances, uncontracted players from the League could switch directly to the Association without a transfer payment, and the League would pay a delayed transfer payment to an Association club if it recruited a player who went on to play fifty VFL games.
- As part of the new co-operation between the League and Association, the umpiring panels of the two competitions were consolidated into a single body. As a result, experienced League umpires Rowan Sawers and Peter Cameron officiated the Association Grand Final.
- The Association increased the number of players on the field to eighteen per side in the Under-19s competition only, consistent with the national standard rules; the Seniors and Reserves continued to field sixteen per side, as they had done since 1959.
- In March 1989, Association president Brook Andersen, who had been re-elected in November 1988 to serve a fifth term as president, took a paid job as the business development director at the League's Footscray Football Club. Many delegates within the Association saw this as a conflict of interest, and as a breach of the requirement for the Association's board of management to be independent, and pressure was put on Andersen to give up one of the roles; consequently, he stepped down as president on 22 March. Vice-president John Grieve, who had been on the VFA executive committee since 1975 and was a director of the Williamstown Football Club from 1973 until stepping down in 1988 as a requirement of serving on the new independent board of management, became the new president on 10 April.
- The Association followed the NFL in adopting the new reportable offence of assault for the 1989 season, which was intended to apply to a severe physical attack more serious than the existing charge of striking. In Round 2, field umpire Geoff Morrow misinterpreted this new rule, incorrectly believing that the charges of assault and striking were equivalent; so, he reported both Jamie Shaw (Preston) and Saade Ghazi (Williamstown) for assault when he should have reported them for striking. Shaw and Ghazi were summarily cleared of the assault charges on this technicality, and were not forced to face striking charges because tribunal procedures did not allow for amendments to the match-day reports. Ghazi went on to win the Liston Trophy; he would have been ineligible had he been reported and suspended for striking in this match.
- The Association established a new award, the Fothergill–Round Medal, awarded to the most promising young player in the Association, and named after Barry Round and Des Fothergill, who both won Brownlow Medals in the VFL before winning an Association best and fairest. The inaugural medal was presented to Chris Owen (Preston) in April 1989; the medal is now awarded at the end of the season.
- Preston was almost forced into receivership during the season after its main source of income, a bingo licence, was cancelled in May. The licence was restored in October, helping the club to survive into the 1990s.
- Wet weather throughout the winter turned several Association grounds into mudheaps. Coburg City Oval was one of the worst affected; Coburg could not train on the ground after mid-June, dividing its training sessions between Skinner Reserve and Coburg Lake, and it moved its Round 18 home game against Port Melbourne to Skinner Reserve; the club sought compensation from the council after estimating that the moving the match cost the club an estimated $10,000 in revenue in takings, since the game against Port Melbourne was usually one of its largest home crowds of the year. North Port Oval, which was overused due to staging both Port Melbourne home games and the televised match of the round, was also badly affected, which was one motivation for moving the Elimination Final to the Beach Road Oval; its proximity to the competing clubs, Springvale and Frankston, was another motivation.
- The Elimination Final became notorious for its violent incidents. A total of five players were reported on twelve charges and were suspended for a combined 26 matches, including: Jeff Sarau (Frankston), who was reported five times, ordered off, suspended for eight matches, and broke Alex Marcou's (Springvale) jaw; and Robert Mace (Frankston), who was suspended for ten weeks on two charges. Neither Sarau nor Marcou played in the Association again.
