= 2011 Port Melbourne Football Club season =

121st season of the Port Melbourne Football Club in the VFA/VFL

Port Melbourne
2011 season
- Coach: Gary Ayres
- Home ground: TEAC Oval
- Home-and-away: 1st
- Finals series: Premiers
- Jack McFarlane Medal: Sam Pleming
- Leading goalkicker: Patrick Rose (79)

The 2011 season was the 121st season of the Port Melbourne Football Club in the Victorian Football League (VFL). The club achieved a perfect season to win its 16th VFA/VFL premiership, marking the club's first senior premiership since 1982 and its first at any level since the 2004 VFL reserves season.

Under senior coach Gary Ayres, Port Melbourne started the season 4–0 (its best start since 1999) and went onto win all 18 of its home-and-away matches, finishing first on the ladder with a percentage of 156.2 and claiming the VFA/VFL minor premiership for the 19th time. In the finals series, Port Melbourne easily defeated Casey to reach the preliminary final, where it defeated the Northern Bullants by 22 points. The grand final saw Port Melbourne overcome a 21-point deficit at quarter-time to defeat Williamstown by 56 points at Etihad Stadium in front of a crowd of 11,804 people.

It was the first time in 93 years (and third time overall) that a VFA/VFL club had won the top division premiership undefeated; such a feat occurred with North Melbourne in 1915 and 1918, although the length of both of those seasons was shortened due to World War I. Geelong West was the only other club to achieve a perfect senior VFA season when it won the Division 2 premiership in 1972.

The success of Port Melbourne was further notable because it was one of just two "standalone" VFL teams competing in the 2011 season without a reserves affiliation with an Australian Football League club (the other being Frankston). It was the first time since the AFL reserves competition merged with the VFL in 2000 that a standalone club had won the premiership.

In addition to winning the premiership, Port Melbourne won the VFL Club Championship as the best-performing club across the senior and reserves competitions during the home-and-away season. Its top three finish on the ladder saw it qualify for the Foxtel Cup in 2012, where it made the semi-finals. Port Melbourne's winning streak lasted until round 8 of the 2012 season, when the club was defeated by Collingwood at Victoria Park.

== Playing list ==
=== 2011 playing squad ===
2011 Port Melbourne Football Club squad
Playing list			Coaching staff
1 Adam Bentick; 2 Shane Valenti; 3 Jonathan Mullins; 4 Heath O'Farrell; 5 Dean Galea; 6 Mitch Keddell; 7 Cory McGrath; 8 Stephen Brewer; 9 Patrick Rose; 10 Toby Pinwill; 11 Myles Pitt; 12 Tristan Francis; 13 Tomi Johnston; 14 Ryan McMahon; 15 John Baird; 16 Malcolm Lynch; 17 Bo Nixon; 18 Wayde Skipper; 19 Zach Sengtock; 20 Sam Dwyer; 21 Jake Edwards; 22 Callum Sinclair	23 Hugh Sandilands; 24 Michael Dillon; 25 Adrian Bonaddio; 26 Nathan Batsanis; 27 Fabian Deluca; 28 Josh Scipione; 29 Chris Cain; 30 David Fanning; 31 Jarrod Dalton; 32 Tim Martin; 33 Jake Dermott; 34 Sebastian Henderson; 35 Marc Johnston; 36 Sam Pleming; 37 Jack Furey; 38 Matthew Wall; 39 Billy Burstin; 40 Daniel Keely; 41 Callan Thornton; 42 Tom Langford; 43 Matthew Lello; 44 Clay Johnston	45 Matthew Smith; 46 Joshua Purcell; 47 Sam O'Sullivan; 48 Mitch Woods; 49 Jacob Castricum; 50 Joshua Free; 51 Joshua Muling; 52 Scott Oakley; 53 Daniel Noonan; 54 Tim Allan; 55 James North; 56 Jason Burge; 57 Tyrone Bean; 58 Tom Cairns; 59 Daniel Willis; 60 Tom Gordon; 61 Nick Green; 62 James Morris; 63 Max Leishman; 64 Bayanda Sobetwa; 65 Lachlan Michell	Head coach: Gary Ayres; Assistant coaches: Andrew Mirams (assistant senior coach); Stephen Mead (senior coaching panel); Jon Edgar (senior coaching panel); Darren Findlay (reserves coach); Greg Ryan (assistant reserves coach); Legend: (c) Captain(s); (vc) Vice-captain(s); Injured; Updated: Source(s):

== VFL season ==
=== Home-and-away season ===
Rd	Date and local time	Opponent	Scores (Port's scores indicated in bold)			Venue	Crowd	Ladder
Rd	Date and local time	Opponent	Home	Away	Result	Venue	Crowd	Ladder
1	Saturday, 2 April (2:00 pm)	Box Hill	10.13 (73)	**15.7 (97)**	Won by 24 points	Box Hill City Oval (H)	1,403	5th
2	Saturday, 9 April (2:00 pm)	Casey	**19.10 (124)**	17.12 (114)	Won by 10 points	TEAC Oval (H)	—	2nd
3	Sunday, 17 April (2:00 pm)	Sandringham	15.8 (98)	**17.12 (114)**	Won by 16 points	Trevor Barker Oval (A)	—	2nd
4	Saturday, 23 April (1:10 pm)	Northern Bullants	18.3 (111)	**21.9 (135)**	Won by 24 points	NAB Oval (A)	—	1st
5	Bye							1st
6	Saturday, 7 May (2:00 pm)	Frankston	**24.17 (161)**	6.3 (39)	Won by 122 points	TEAC Oval (H)	—	1st
7	Saturday, 14 May (2:00 pm)	Williamstown	**15.7 (97)**	6.10 (46)	Won by 51 points	TEAC Oval (H)	—	1st
8	Sunday, 22 May (2:00 pm)	Bendigo	13.6 (84)	**19.12 (126)**	Won by 42 points	Windy Hill (A)	—	1st
9	Bye							1st
10	Saturday, 4 June (1:10 pm)	Werribee	**17.9 (111)**	13.14 (92)	Won by 19 points	TEAC Oval (H)	—	1st
11	Saturday, 11 June (2:00 pm)	Coburg	7.6 (48)	**22.20 (152)**	Won by 104 points	Coburg City Oval (A)	—	1st
12	Saturday, 18 June (2:00 pm)	North Ballarat	8.7 (55)	**18.11 (119)**	Won by 64 points	Eureka Stadium (A)	—	1st
13	Saturday, 25 June (1:10 pm)	Geelong	**19.9 (123)**	12.10 (82)	Won by 41 points	TEAC Oval (H)	—	1st
14	Bye							1st
15	Saturday, 9 July (2:00 pm)	Collingwood	9.12 (66)	**17.12 (114)**	Won by 48 points	Victoria Park (A)	—	1st
16	Saturday, 6 July (2:00 pm)	Bendigo	**18.16 (124)**	12.11 (83)	Won by 41 points	TEAC Oval (H)	—	1st
17	Saturday, 23 July (1:10 pm)	Sandringham	**13.16 (94)**	10.10 (70)	Won by 24 points	TEAC Oval (H)	—	1st
18	Bye							1st
19	Sunday, 7 August (2:00 pm)	Frankston	5.6 (36)	**19.12 (126)**	Won by 90 points	Frankston Park (A)	—	1st
20	Saturday, 13 August (1:10 pm)	Williamstown	16.18 (114)	**17.17 (119)**	Won by 5 points	Chirnside Park (A)	—	1st
21	Saturday, 20 August (2:00 pm)	Northern Bullants	**20.11 (131)**	15.8 (98)	Won by 33 points	TEAC Oval (H)	—	1st
22	Saturday, 27 August (1:10 pm)	Box Hill	**14.11 (95)**	11.9 (75)	Won by 20 points	TEAC Oval (H)	—	1st

=== Finals series ===
Rd	Date and local time	Opponent	Scores (Port's scores indicated in bold)			Venue	Crowd
Rd	Date and local time	Opponent	Home	Away	Result	Venue	Crowd
Qualifying final	Saturday, 3 September (2:10 pm)	Casey	**24.16 (160)**	9.9 (63)	Won by 97 points	TEAC Oval	—
Preliminary final	Saturday, 17 September (2:10 pm)	Northern Bullants	**18.19 (127)**	16.9 (105)	Won by 22 points	TEAC Oval	—
Grand Final	Sunday, 25 September (2:15 pm)	Williamstown	**22.12 (144)**	13.10 (88)	Won by 56 points	Etihad Stadium	11,804

== Awards and milestones ==
Port Melbourne's Shane Valenti won the J. J. Liston Trophy with 25 votes as the VFL's best-and-fairest player, the second year in a row that he had won the award. Patrick Rose kicked 67 goals during the home-and-away season to claim the Jim 'Frosty' Miller Medal as the VFL's leading goalkicker.

=== Club awards ===
- Jack McFarlane Medal (best and fairest): Sam Pleming
- 2nd best and fairest: Sam Dwyer
- 3rd best and fairest: Shane Valenti
- Leading goalkicker: Patrick Rose (79 goals, including finals)
