= 1917 VFA season =

1917 VFA premiership season
- Premiers: Premiership not contested

The 1917 Victorian Football Association season was not played owing to World War I, which was at its peak at the time.

== Abandonment of the season ==
To support the war effort in World War I, the Association had curtailed its 1915 season by five weeks, and then cancelled its 1916 season entirely. With the war still ongoing, the Association voted on 5 February 1917 to cancel the 1917 season as well. 1917 was the last Association season cancelled during World War I, with a premiership season held in 1918 with a reduced number of clubs.
