= 2011 VFL season =

130th season of the Victorian Football League

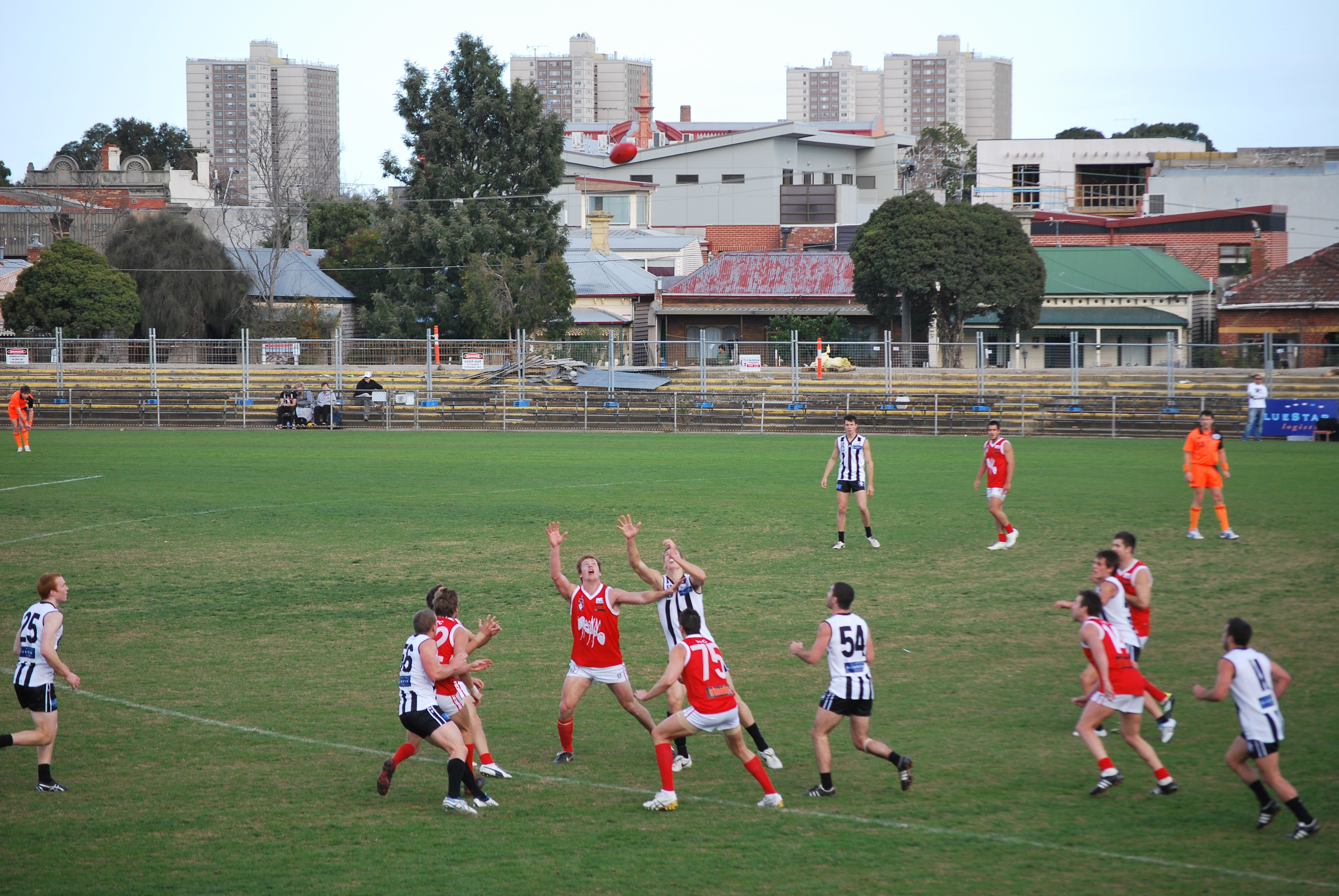
- Collingwood and the Northern Bullants in round 10
- Teams: 13
- Premiers: Port Melbourne; 16th premiership
- Minor premiers: Port Melbourne; 19th minor premiership
- J. J. Liston Trophy: Shane Valenti (Port Melbourne – 25 votes)
- Frosty Miller Medallist: Patrick Rose (Port Melbourne – 67 goals)

The 2011 VFL season was the 130th season of the Victorian Football League (VFL), a second-tier Australian rules football competition played in the state of Victoria.

== Teams ==
The league contracted from fourteen teams to thirteen, after the Gold Coast Football Club left and entered the Australian Football League. The fledgling Gold Coast club had used the 2009 TAC Cup season and the 2010 VFL season as preparation for joining the AFL. There was originally speculation that the Greater Western Sydney Giants, which had played TAC Cup in 2010 and was set to join the AFL in 2012, may have spent the 2011 season in the VFL under a similar plan, but instead the club opted to play in the North East Australian Football League.

The VFL continued to serve as both the top state-level football league in Victoria, and as a reserves competition for Victorian-based clubs in the Australian Football League, as had been the case since 2000. The affiliation agreements between VFL and AFL clubs were unchanged from 2010.

The top three teams from 2010 – North Ballarat, Northern Bullants and Williamstown – competed in the inaugural Foxtel Cup competition, with Williamstown winning the event.

Port Melbourne dominated the 2011 season, winning twenty-one games in a row to win the premiership undefeated. In the home-and-away season, the Borough finished with a record of 18–0, finishing four games clear atop the ladder; it was the first time a club had finished the home-and-away season undefeated since Geelong West in 1972 Division 2, and the first to do so in the top division since Williamstown in 1957. The Borough maintained its undefeated record through the finals to claim the premiership, replicating the feat of Geelong West's 1972 team, but becoming the first team to achieve the feat in the top division since North Melbourne in 1918.

== Ladder ==
Pos	Team	Pld	W	L	D	PF	PA	PP	Pts	
1	Port Melbourne (P)	18	18	0	0	2162	1384	156.2	72	Finals
2	Williamstown	18	14	4	0	2087	1486	140.4	56	Finals
3	North Ballarat	18	14	4	0	1823	1385	131.6	56	Finals
4	Casey Scorpions	18	11	7	0	1868	1529	122.2	44	Finals
5	Werribee	18	10	8	0	1847	1710	108.0	40	Finals
6	Northern Bullants	18	10	8	0	1699	1754	96.9	40	Finals
7	Bendigo Bombers	18	9	9	0	1802	1874	96.2	36	Finals
8	Box Hill Hawks	18	7	11	0	1485	1656	89.7	28	Finals
9	Geelong	18	6	12	0	1759	1785	98.5	24	
10	Sandringham	18	6	12	0	1537	1786	86.1	24	
11	Coburg Tigers	18	6	12	0	1449	1812	80.0	24	
12	Collingwood	18	4	14	0	1555	1962	79.3	16	
13	Frankston	18	2	16	0	1137	2087	54.5	8	

Source: sportingpulse.com
Rules for classification: 1) points; 2) percentage; 3) number of points for.
(P) Premiers

== Finals series ==
Qualifying and elimination finals
Sep 3, TEAC Oval
1	Port Melbourne	24.16 (160)
4	Casey Scorpions	9.9 (63)
3 Sep, Avalon Airport Oval
5	Werribee	13.11 (89)
8	Box Hill Hawks	9.9 (63)
4 Sep, TEAC Oval
6	Northern Bullants	14.9 (93)
7	Bendigo Bombers	10.5 (65)
4 Sep, Box Hill City Oval
2	Williamstown	20.14 (134)
3	North Ballarat	10.7 (67)

Semi-finals
10 Sep, TEAC Oval
Casey Scorpions	6.15 (51)
Werribee	16.17 (113)
11 Sep, TEAC Oval
North Ballarat	12.6 (78)
Northern Bullants	14.12 (96)

Preliminary finals
17 Sep, TEAC Oval
Port Melbourne	18.19 (127)
Northern Bullants	16.9 (105)
18 Sep, TEAC Oval
Williamstown	23.19 (157)
Werribee	11.8 (74)

Grand final
25 Sep, Etihad Stadium
Port Melbourne	22.12 (144)
Williamstown	13.10 (88)

=== Grand Final ===
2011 VFL Grand Final
Sunday, 25 September (2:15 pm)	Port Melbourne	def.	Williamstown	Etihad Stadium (crowd: 11,804)	Report
2.0 (12); 9.7 (61); 15.10 (100); 22.12 (144)	Q1; Q2; Q3; Final	5.3 (33); 6.4 (40); 12.7 (79); 13.10 (88)	Norm Goss Memorial Medal: Toby Pinwill (Port Melbourne)

== Awards ==
- The J. J. Liston Trophy was won for the second consecutive year by Shane Valenti (Port Melbourne), who polled 25 votes. Valenti finished ahead of Matthew Bate (Casey Scorpions), who was second with 15 votes, and Ben Jolley (Williamstown), who was third with 13 votes.
- The Frosty Miller Medal was won by Patrick Rose (Port Melbourne), who kicked 67 goals for the season.
- The Fothergill–Round Medal was won by Ahmed Saad (Northern Bullants)
- The top three teams, Port Melbourne, Williamstown and Werribee, qualified for the 2012 Foxtel Cup tournament.
- The reserves premiership was won by Box Hill. Box Hill 18.10 (118) defeated Coburg 7.11 (53) in the Grand Final, played as a curtain-raiser to the seniors first preliminary final on 17 September at TEAC Oval.

2011 VFL Team of the Year
B:	David Mirra (Box Hill)	Jarrod Dalton (Port Melbourne)	Tim Mohr (Casey)
HB:	Hugh Sandilands (Port Melbourne)	Sam Pleming (Port Melbourne)	Adam Iacobucci (Northern Bullants)
C:	Ben Davies (Williamstown)	Ben Jolley (Williamstown)	Sam Gibson (Box Hill)
HF:	Sam Dwyer (Port Melbourne)	Matthew Little (Bendigo Bombers)	Robbie Castello (Werribee)
F:	Patrick Rose (Port Melbourne)	Dean Galea (Port Melbourne)	Ahmed Saad (Northern Bullants)
Foll:	Orren Stephenson (North Ballarat)	Myles Sewell (North Ballarat)	Tom Sundberg (Collingwood)
Int:	Matthew O'Dwyer (Werribee)	Shane Valenti (Port Melbourne)	Russell Gabriel (Frankston)
Int:	Chris Cain (Port Melbourne)	James Wall (Casey)	Sam Power (Coburg Tigers)
Coach:	Gary Ayres (Port Melbourne)		

== See also ==
- List of VFA/VFL premiers
- Australian Rules Football
- Victorian Football League
- Australian Football League
- 2011 AFL season
