= Brad Nimmo =

Australian rules footballer

Personal information
- Full name: Brad Nimmo
- Born: 3 February 1959 (age 67)
- Original team: Coburg
- Height: 190 cm (6 ft 3 in)
- Weight: 85 kg (187 lb)

Playing career^{1}
Years	Club	Games (Goals)
1982–83	North Melbourne	13 (0)
- ^{1} Playing statistics correct to the end of 1983.

Brad Nimmo (born 3 February 1959) is a former Australian rules footballer who played for North Melbourne in the Victorian Football League (VFL) during the early 1980s.

Nimmo spent two seasons playing at North Melbourne, after a stint in the Essendon reserves, but is best remembered for his 154-game career with Coburg in the Victorian Football Association, which he captained from 1987 to 1991. This included back to back premierships in 1988 and 1989, under coach Phil Cleary. He was later named as the captain and centre half back in Coburg's official 'Team of the Century'.
