= 1918 VFA season =

Australian football season

1918 VFA premiership season
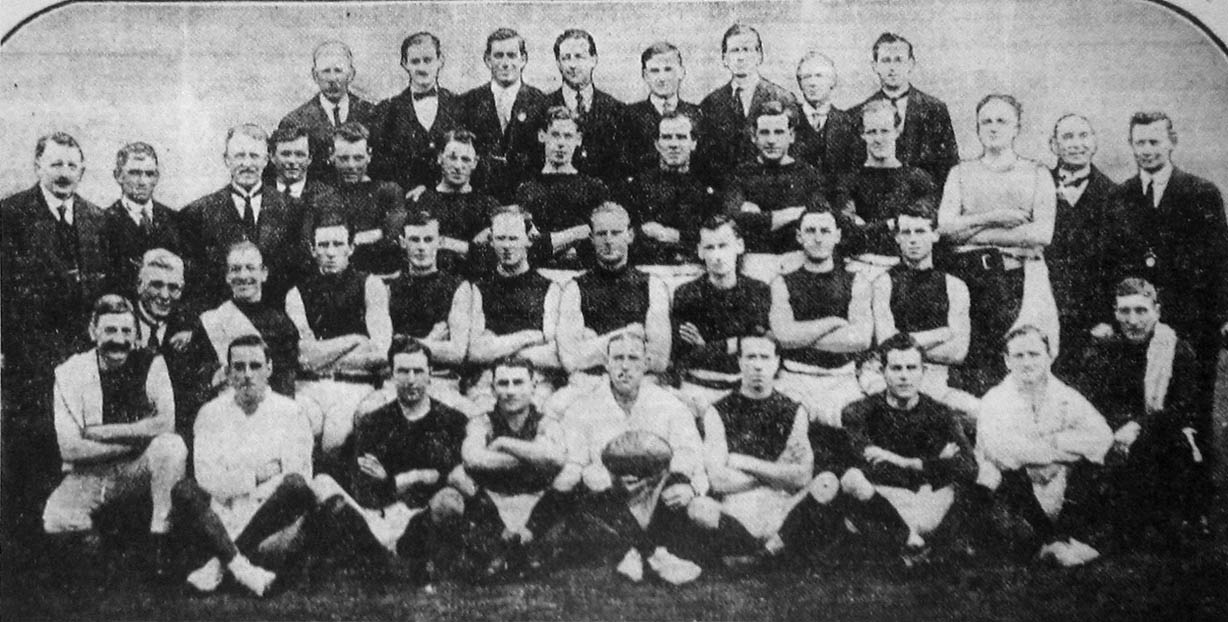
- North Melbourne, premier team
- Teams: 6
- Premiers: North Melbourne; 6th premiership
- Minor premiers: North Melbourne; 5th minor premiership

The 1918 Victorian Football Association season was the 40th season of the Australian rules football competition. Played during the final year of hostilities in World War I, the 1918 season was the first to be played since 1915; but it was a short season, played with only six clubs, and with only ten rounds of matches before the finals.

The premiership was won by the North Melbourne Football Club, after it defeated Prahran by 93 points in the final on August 10. It was the club's sixth VFA premiership, and its third in a sequence of three premierships won consecutively between 1914 and 1918. North Melbourne won all twelve premiership matches it played during 1918, repeating its feat from 1915 of going through the season unbeaten (albeit over shortened seasons on both occasions); it was the last time a club would achieve the feat until Geelong West in 1972. The season was part of a 58-match winning streak for North Melbourne which lasted from 1914 to 1919.

== Re-commencement of play ==
To support the war effort in World War I, the Association had curtailed its 1915 season by five weeks, and then cancelled its 1916 and 1917 seasons entirely. Despite the fact that the circumstances of the war had not changed since 1916, several clubs were keen to resume playing in 1918, and at the Association meeting on 15 April, a resolution to play the season was passed by a majority of 10–5.

Six clubs – Brunswick, Footscray, North Melbourne, Northcote, Port Melbourne and Prahran – opted to play in 1918. The remaining four clubs – Brighton, Essendon, Hawthorn and Williamstown – did not play, and ultimately returned to competition the following year after hostilities ceased.

The Argus suggested that the Association clubs were motivated to return to playing in spite of the war due to the impending expiration of a wartime agreement between the League and Association regarding player clearances. Before the war, the two bodies generally did not recognise each other's transfer permits, so if an Association player transferred to a League club without a permit from the Association, he would be disqualified from playing in the Association for a period of time, but the League would allow him to play without penalty; but under the wartime agreement, the rival competitions did recognise each other's permits, so in the above example the player would be barred from playing in the League, or his League club penalised for fielding him. The Argus contended that there was a fear that when this agreement ended on 1 July 1918, the lack of an Association premiership to contest would result in an exodus of senior players to the League from which the Association might not recover.

== Premiership ==
The short home-and-home season was played over only ten rounds, with each club playing the others twice; then, the top four clubs contested a finals series under the amended Argus system to determine the premiers for the season.

=== Ladder ===
1918 VFA ladder
Pos	Team	Pld	W	L	D	PF	PA	PP	Pts
1	North Melbourne (P)	10	10	0	0	851	405	47.6	48 (Note: 8 bonus points)
2	Prahran	10	6	4	0	701	613	87.4	24
3	Brunswick	10	5	5	0	609	608	99.8	20
4	Port Melbourne	10	4	6	0	541	638	117.9	16
5	Northcote	10	3	7	0	592	597	100.8	12
6	Footscray	10	2	8	0	406	715	176.1	8

Rules for classification: 1) points; 2) percentage; 3) number of points for.
(P) Premiers

=== Finals ===
	Semi Finals
Saturday, 27 July	Prahran 8.10 (58)	def.	Port Melbourne 8.8 (56)	North Melbourne Recreation Reserve (crowd: 3,000)
Saturday, 3 August	North Melbourne 10.23 (83)	def.	Brunswick 4.11 (35)	North Melbourne Recreation Reserve (crowd: 5,000)

1918 VFA Final
Saturday, 10 August	North Melbourne	def.	Prahran	North Melbourne Recreation Reserve (crowd: 7,000)
6.2 (38); 11.6 (72); 15.7 (97); 18.13 (121)	Q1; Q2; Q3; Final	0.2 (2); 1.6 (12); 3.7 (25); 3.10 (28)	Umpires: Hurley
Stevens 9	Goals
Had Prahran won, minor premiers North Melbourne would have been entitled to a rematch the following Saturday to decide the premiership.

== Awards ==
- Stevens (North Melbourne) was the leading goalkicker for the season, kicking 54 goals.

== See also ==
- List of VFA premiers
