= Cameron Doyle =

Australian rules footballer

Personal information
- Born: 12 July 1964 (age 62)
- Original team: Preston (VFA)
- Height: 180 cm (5 ft 11 in)
- Weight: 74 kg (163 lb)
- Position: Wing

Playing career^{1}
Years	Club	Games (Goals)
1985–1987	Collingwood	6 (6)
- ^{1} Playing statistics correct to the end of 1987.

Career highlights
- Preston VFA Premiership Player: 1984; Coburg VFA Premiership Player: 1989

Cameron Michael Doyle (born 12 July 1964) is a former Australian rules footballer who played with Collingwood in the Victorian Football League (VFL).

== Professional career ==
Doyle was part of Preston's Victorian Football Association (VFA) premiership side of 1984 playing as a back pocket. Recruited by Collingwood, Doyle played four games in the 1985 VFL season, which included a three-goal debut, against North Melbourne. Doyle's 1985 season consisted of an average of 14 disposals, 5 marks, and 1.25 goals.

Doyle's career-high would come in his third game a clash against Melbourne in Round 14 at the Melbourne Cricket Ground (MCG), gaining 19 disposals, including 16 kicks, seven marks, and a goal. In Cameron's fourth game against Essendon at Victoria Park, he dislocated his shoulder just minutes before halftime. He was on track to have his career-best game with a total of 14 disposals and 7 marks. As a result of this injury, he didn't feature at all in 1986 season before coming back and playing two games in the 1987 season. In October 1988, having not made a VFL appearance that year, Doyle was dropped from the Collingwood list.

Doyle then became a member of Coburg's 1989 premiership team.

== Personal life ==
Doyle now runs a memorabilia shop in Fitzroy called Memorabilia on Smith. He is married with three kids.
