= Skinner Reserve =

Sports venue in Braybrook, Victoria

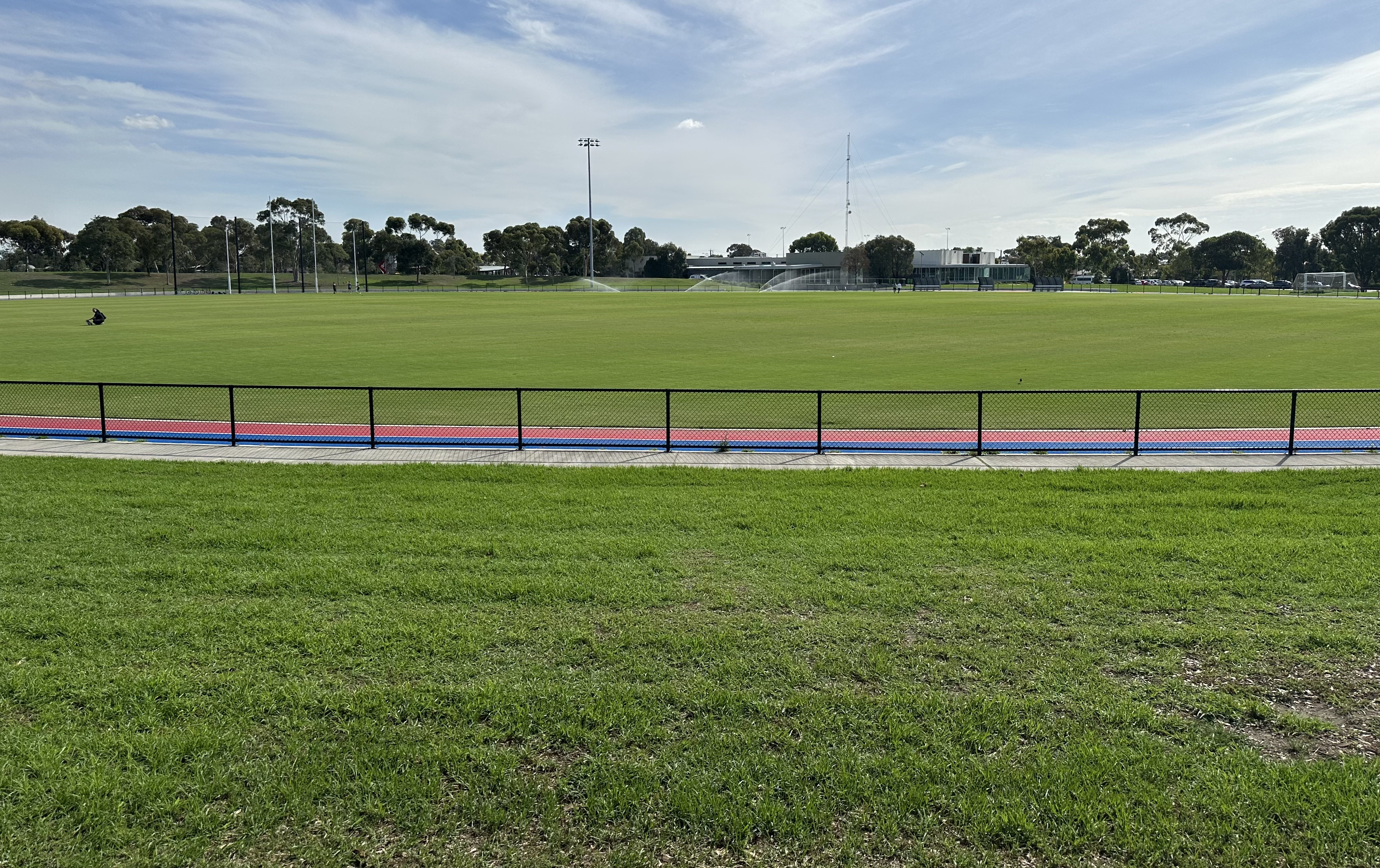
- Skinner Reserve in 2026
- Interactive map of Skinner Reserve
- Address: Churchill Ave; Braybrook, Victoria
- Coordinates: 37°47′14″S 144°51′19″E
- Owner: City of Maribyrnong
- Capacity: 5,000
- Record attendance: 8,000 (Footscray Legends vs Collingwood Legends, 22 October 1989)
- Field size: 175 m × 155 m (574 ft × 509 ft)

Construction
- Groundbreaking: 1965; 61 years ago
- Opened: 23 April 1966; 60 years ago
- Cost: A$3 million (2021–23 redevelopment)

Tenants
- Sunshine Football Club (1966–1989); Sunshine George Cross FC (1989–1991)

Skinner Reserve is an Australian rules football, cricket and soccer venue located in the Melbourne suburb of Braybrook. It is most notable as the former home ground of the Sunshine Football Club in the Victorian Football Association (VFA).

== History ==
=== Background and development ===
Prior to Skinner Reserve being developed as a football ground, the primary sports venue in the City of Sunshine was Selwyn Park in Albion. In 1964, the local council agreed to lease Selwyn Park to George Cross FC, which was playing in Victoria's top-level soccer league at the time. However, the Sunshine Football Club (SFC), as well as local baseball and sub-district cricket clubs, still had three years to run on their lease at the venue.

To secure agreement from the SFC to end the lease, the Sunshine City Council committed to developing a new VFA-standard venue at Skinner Reserve. The venue was built during the 1965 season, with the football club signing a seven-year lease that begun in 1966.

Before construction was finished, the Footscray Football Club – which was competing in the Victorian Football League (VFL) – made an application to the council to permanently move its playing and administrative base from Western Oval to the new venue and develop it into a VFL-standard ground. At the time, fellow VFL clubs St Kilda and North Melbourne had recently moved their bases to VFA venues (Moorabbin Oval and Coburg City Oval respectively). The council ultimately honoured its existing agreement with the Sunshine Football Club and rejected Footscray's application.

The ground was named after Henry Robert Skinner, who served as the mayor of Sunshine for one term in 1952.

=== VFA ===
Sunshine played its first VFA match at Skinner Reserve on 23 April 1966, losing to Prahran by four points. The venue had a very wide playing surface, high grassed embankments for spectators, and a grandstand – narrow, but quite tall by suburban standards – named the J. A. Chigwidden Stand, after long-serving club secretary Jack Chigwidden.

In addition to Sunshine's home matches, Skinner Reserve hosted VFA seconds/reserves finals matches, including several grand finals. VFL clubs often played pre-season matches at the ground because it was not used for cricket during much of its history, rendering it available during summer.

Floodlights were installed at the ground in 1987 to enable matches to be played at night, although the only such VFA premiership match to be scheduled was cancelled due to the forfeiture of Sunshine's opponent, Caulfield, for unrelated reasons.

Sunshine competed in Division 2 for most of its time in the VFA. Because of this, crowd numbers at Skinner Reserve were lower than other clubs and often did not exceed 1,000. The venue had a capacity of around 15,000 people at the time, although it was never recorded reaching that number.

The VFA dissolved Division 2 at the end of the 1988 season. Sunshine was part of the single-division competition in 1989, but it was uncompetitive against the VFA's strongest sides and withdrew from the competition on 8 June 1989. Its final match at Skinner Reserve was a 146-point loss to Springvale in round 7, although Coburg played Port Melbourne at the venue in round 18 after wet weather turned Coburg City Oval into a mudheap.

=== Post-VFA ===
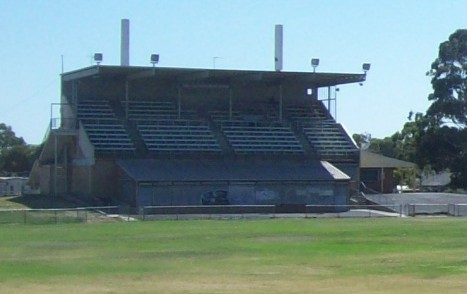
The J. A. Chigwidden Stand pictured in March 2014, prior to its demolishment

On 22 October 1989, a fundraising match was held between former Footscray and Collingwood players at Skinner Reserve, which drew a large crowd of 8,000 people as part of a campaign to stop a proposed merger between Footscray and Fitzroy.

George Cross FC (known as Sunshine George Cross FC by this point) played National Soccer League (NSL) matches at Skinner Reserve, beginning in November 1989. A crowd of 6,100 people watched the club's first match at the ground, which saw George Cross defeat South Melbourne FC 2–0. During the 1990–91 season, two matches at Skinner Reserve saw crowds of 4,000 people. After George Cross returned to the Victoria Premier League in 1992, the club moved to Chaplin Reserve in Sunshine.

The Chigwidden Stand was demolished in late 2015. Its function as a pavilion was taken over by the Braybrook Community Hub, which is located in the wider Braybrook Park area.

In February 2016, the ground's cricket pitch was dug up and vandalised overnight between the first and second day of a Victorian Turf Cricket Association (VTCA) match between Kingsville Baptist and Sunshine Heights. The damage rendered the wicket unplayable and the match was declared abandoned, meaning Kingsville missed out on qualification for the finals.

Redevelopment of Skinner Reserve began in October 2021, which was co-funded by the Western Bulldogs and the Maribyrnong City Council. The Bulldogs used the ground for training in 2022 while Whitten Oval was undergoing renovation. The redevelopment was completed in February 2023, providing the venue with new floodlights and a running track around the perimeter of the oval. Maribyrnong Greens SC, which moved to Skinner Reserve in the 2000s, criticised the Bulldogs after it was forced to change its training schedule.

The Western Football Netball League (WFNL) hosted the Thirds grand final – along with Division 1 men's, senior women's and under-18s finals matches – at Skinner Reserve in 2024. Several WFNL home-and-away matches have also been held at the venue since the redevelopment was completed.
