= 1890 VFA season =

14th season of the Victorian Football Association

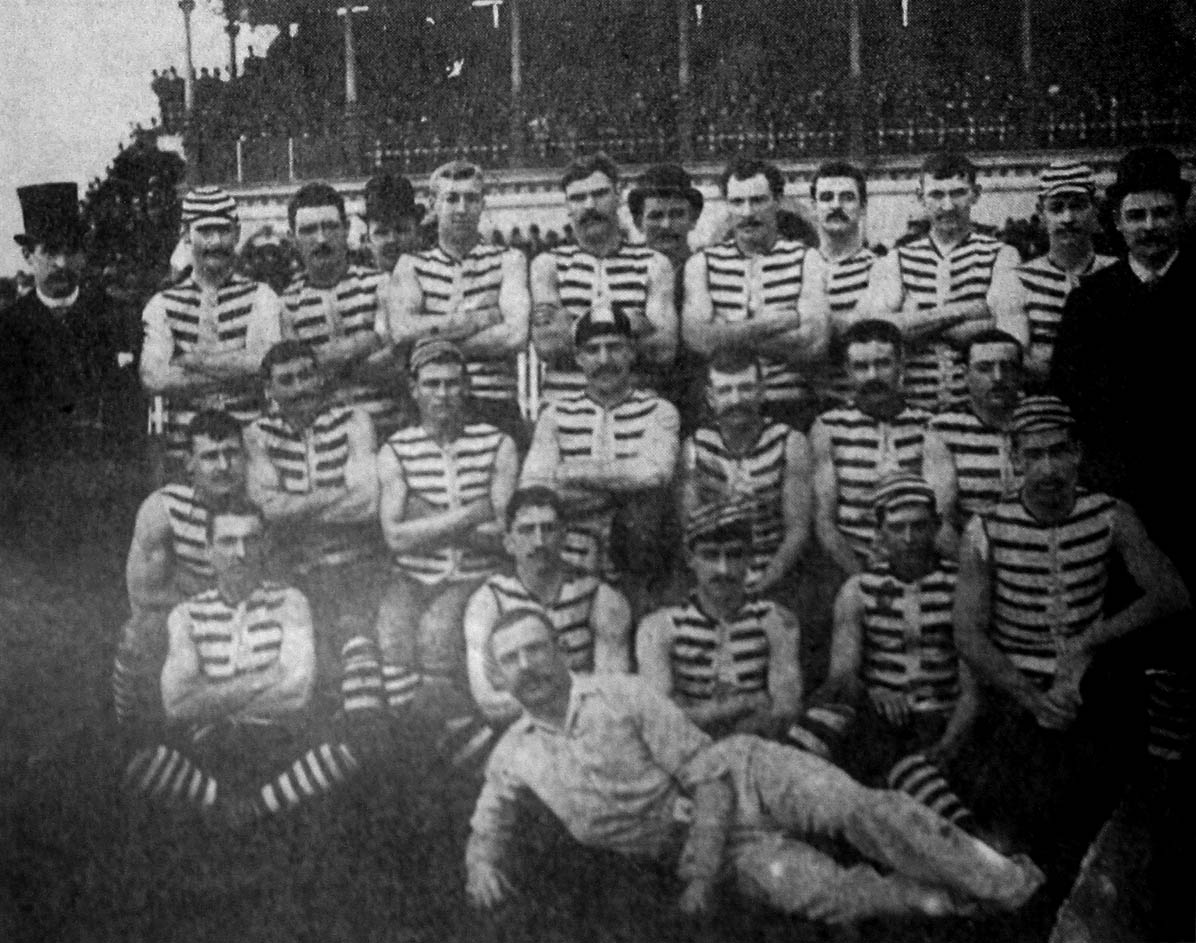
- South Melbourne – 1890 VFA premiers

Overview
- Date: 3 May – 27 September 1890
- Teams: 12
- Premiers: South Melbourne; 5th premiership

The 1890 VFA season was the 14th season of the Victorian Football Association (VFA), the highest-level Australian rules football competition in the colony of Victoria.

South Melbourne won the premiership for the fifth time. It was third out of a sequence of three consecutive premierships won by the club from 1888 to 1890.

== Ladder ==
Teams did not play a uniform number of premiership matches during the season. As such, in the final standings, each team's premiership points were adjusted upwards proportionally to represent a 20-match season – e.g., South Melbourne played 19 matches, so its tally of premiership points was increased by a factor of 20/19. After this adjustment, there was no formal process for breaking a tie.

| Pos | Team | Pld | W | L | D | GF | GA | Pts | Adj Pts |
|---|---|---|---|---|---|---|---|---|---|
| 1 | South Melbourne (P) | 19 | 16 | 2 | 1 | 103 | 42 | 66 | 69.47 |
| 2 | Carlton | 19 | 13 | 4 | 2 | 114 | 58 | 56 | 58.95 |
| 3 | Essendon | 19 | 10 | 4 | 5 | 92 | 59 | 50 | 52.63 |
| 4 | Fitzroy | 18 | 11 | 6 | 1 | 111 | 51 | 46 | 51.11 |
| 5 | North Melbourne | 19 | 9 | 6 | 4 | 75 | 60 | 44 | 46.32 |
| 6 | St Kilda | 18 | 8 | 7 | 3 | 74 | 70 | 38 | 42.22 |
| 7 | Geelong | 19 | 9 | 8 | 2 | 68 | 91 | 40 | 42.11 |
| 8 | Melbourne | 19 | 6 | 9 | 4 | 69 | 89 | 32 | 33.68 |
| 9 | Port Melbourne | 20 | 6 | 10 | 4 | 69 | 91 | 32 | 32.00 |
| 10 | Footscray | 18 | 4 | 13 | 1 | 45 | 75 | 18 | 20.00 |
| 11 | Richmond | 18 | 3 | 14 | 1 | 43 | 113 | 14 | 15.56 |
| 12 | Williamstown | 18 | 2 | 14 | 2 | 43 | 107 | 12 | 13.33 |

(P) Premiers

== Notable events ==
- On 9 August, Fitzroy 4.13 defeated Port Melbourne 3.7 at the Port Melbourne Cricket Ground. Port Melbourne raised a protest, on the grounds that the mark from which Jack Worrall scored Fitzroy's first goal was taken after the half time bell was rung, although neither the field umpire nor the goal umpire had heard the bell; the Association upheld the appeal, and amended the result to a 3.13 vs 3.7 draw. This decision resulted in Fitzroy dropping from third to fourth place on the premiership list, with Essendon rising to third place. "Follower", the influential football writer in the Leader and the Age newspapers, refused to recognise the Association's decision, describing it as ultra vires, and published a premiership list with the win standing and with Fitzroy in third place; his newspapers maintained this position in subsequent years. Later publications, including the Football Record, have listed Fitzroy as the third-placed club in 1890, but it is unclear whether this is the result of the Association reversing its decision or of the Record using the Age as its reference. The premiership list given in this article recognises the match in question as a draw, consistent with the official position of the Association at the time the season was closed, and as published in the Argus.
