= Robert Mace =

Australian rules footballer

Personal information
- Full name: Robert Mace
- Born: 12 August 1958 (age 68)
- Original team: Frankston YCW
- Height: 178 cm (5 ft 10 in)
- Weight: 93 kg (205 lb)
- Position: Half forward flanker

Playing career^{1}
Years	Club	Games (Goals)
1980–81	Hawthorn	7 (7)
1982–86	St Kilda	72 (32)
1988	Brisbane Bears	1 (0)
Total		80 (39)
- ^{1} Playing statistics correct to the end of 1988.

Robert Mace (born 12 August 1958) is a former Australian rules footballer who played for Hawthorn, St Kilda and the Brisbane Bears in the Victorian Football League (VFL) during the 1980s.

Originally from Frankston YCW, Mace started his VFL career at Hawthorn in 1980 but was unable establish himself as a senior player there so crossed to St Kilda in 1982 where he became a regular in the side for five seasons.

Mace was offloaded to the league's new club, Brisbane, in 1987 but he would only make one appearance. He represented Queensland at the 1988 Adelaide Bicentennial Carnival before returning to Victoria and finishing his career with Victorian Football Association (VFA) team Frankston, whom he also coached until 2002.

On 5 August 2015 it was reported that Mace was suspended from Frankston following a fight with a Frankston official at a VFL match the previous weekend.
