= Springvale Reserve =

Sports venue in Springvale, Victoria

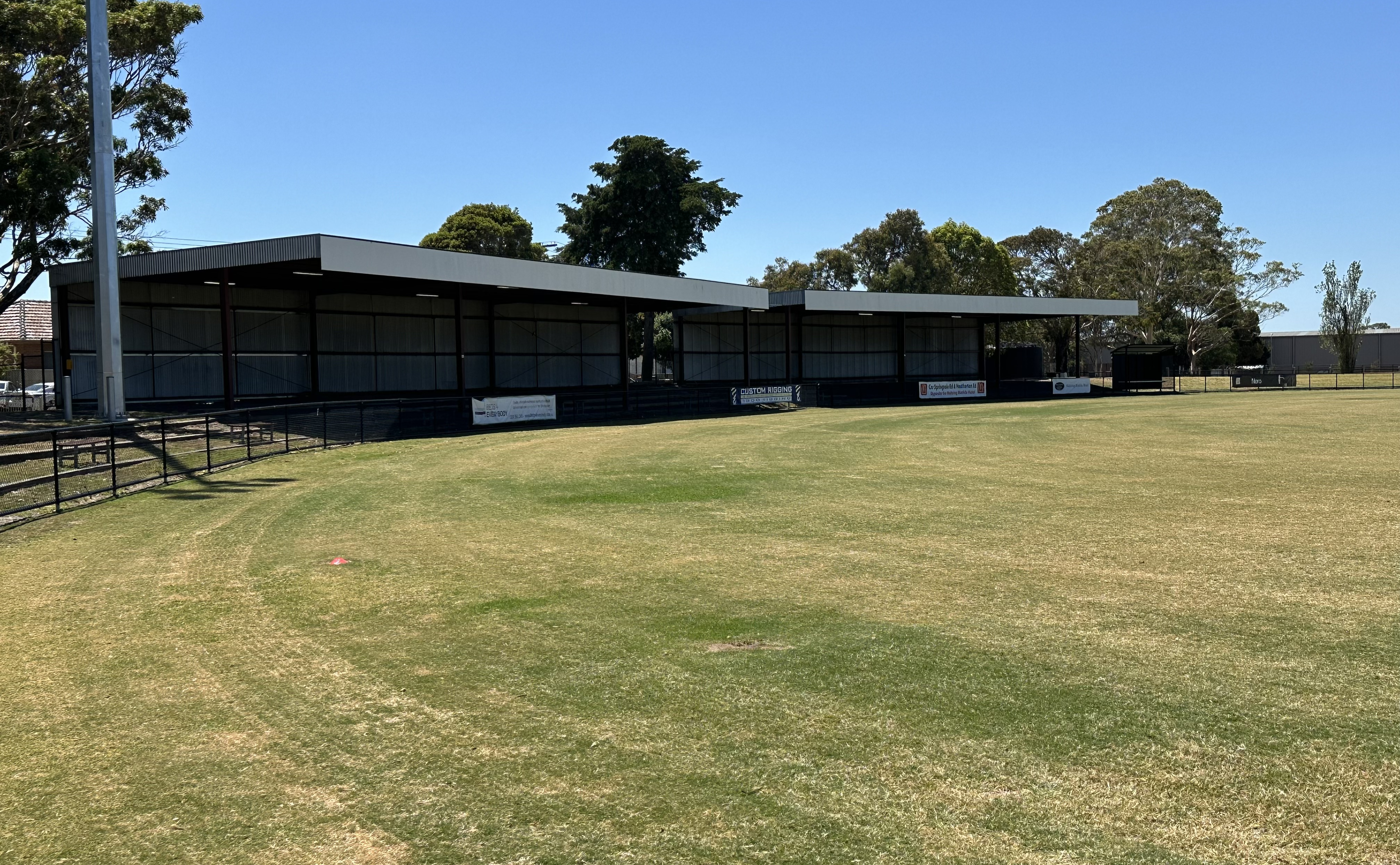
- Springvale Reserve in January 2026
- Interactive map of Springvale Reserve
- Address: Newcomen Rd; Springvale, Victoria
- Coordinates: 37.943602°S 145.147565°E
- Owner: City of Greater Dandenong
- Record attendance: 5,600 (Springvale vs Brunswick, 15 June 1986)
- Field size: 165 metres × 137 metres

Tenants
- Springvale Districts Football Club (SFNL); Silverton Cricket Club (DDCA)

Springvale Reserve (also known as the Springvale Recreation Reserve and Newcomen Road Oval) is an Australian rules football and cricket venue located in the Melbourne suburb of Springvale. The name also refers to the wider public park in which the main oval is located.

As of 2025, it is home to the Springvale Districts Football Club in the Southern Football Netball League (SFNL) and the Silverton Cricket Club in the Dandenong District Cricket Association (DDCA). It was formerly the home of the Springvale Football Club and the Springvale Cricket Club.

In addition to being the home of Springvale Districts, the SFNL often uses Springvale Reserve to host several finals matches. The ground was also used for Federal Football League (FFL) grand finals.

== History ==
The Springvale Football Club (SFC) was formed in 1903 and moved to Springvale Reserve in 1915. The club was admitted into the Victorian Football Association (VFA) – later renamed to the Victorian Football League (VFL) – in 1982. The highest recorded VFA crowd at Springvale Reserve was during the 1986 Division 1 season, when 5,600 people attended Springvale's round 8 match against Brunswick.

By 2000 – the year that the VFL merged with the AFL reserves – the facilities at Springvale Reserve were in a rundown condition, and Football Victoria officials ruled that the ground wasn't up to VFL standard. SFC played all but one of its home matches at Waverley Park during the 2000 season, before moving all home matches to either Moorabbin Oval or Shepley Oval in 2001 and 2002. In both 2003 and 2004, seven VFL matches were played at Springvale Reserve.

In 2005, SFC reached an arrangement with the City of Casey, which had developed the new Casey Fields multi-sports complex in Cranbourne East and was seeking for a VFL team to play there. The club moved its training and playing base to Casey Fields in 2006, changing its name to the Casey Scorpions. Ahead of the move, SFC played all of its home matches at Springvale Reserve during the 2005 season (the first time it had done this since 1998). The final VFA/VFL match at the ground was between Springvale and Port Melbourne on 14 August 2005.

A digital scoreboard was installed at Springvale Reserve in 2013.

During the 2022 Victorian state election campaign, the Labor Party committed to funding which would upgrade the ground's facilities, including the main oval and cricket nets. The upgrades were completed in July 2025.
