= Shane Valenti =

Australian rules footballer (born 1987)

Personal information
- Born: 29 January 1987 (age 39)
- Original team: Sandringham Dragons / Sandringham Zebras
- Debut: Round 8, 2008, Melbourne vs. Adelaide, at AAMI Stadium
- Height: 176 cm (5 ft 9 in)
- Weight: 80 kg (176 lb)

Playing career^{1}
Years	Club	Games (Goals)
2008–2009	Melbourne	15 (5)
- ^{1} Playing statistics correct to the end of 2009.

Career highlights
- J. J. Liston Trophy 2010, 2011; VFL Team of the Year 2010, 2011; Fothergill–Round Medal 2007

Shane Valenti (born 29 January 1987) is an Australian rules footballer, who played for the Melbourne Football Club in the Australian Football League (AFL).

Valenti was selected with the 51st selection in the 2007 NAB AFL Rookie Draft, which was Melbourne's final draft selection for that season. He made his mark in the Victorian Football League, playing with Melbourne's VFL-affiliate Sandringham, as a tough, in-and-under midfielder, and won the Fothergill–Round Medal as the league's most outstanding young player.

Valenti made his senior debut for Melbourne in Round 8 against Adelaide in the 2008 season, he played a total of nine games for the year. The 2009 season saw Valenti only manage six senior games for Melbourne, spending majority of the season as a consistent performer in the VFL, with Melbourne's new affiliate team Casey. He finished fifth in Casey's best and fairest. At the end of the 2009 season, Valenti was delisted by Melbourne.

In 2010, Valenti moved to Port Melbourne in the VFL, where he played for the next five seasons. He was joint winner of the J. J. Liston Trophy in 2010, tying on 20 votes with North Ballarat's Steve Clifton. The following year, he won the Liston Trophy again, this time outright, becoming the third player in VFA/VFL history to win the award back-to-back. With his win, there was speculation that he may be recruited by AFL teams Greater Western Sydney or Essendon, but neither eventuated and he remained with Port Melbourne. He departed Port Melbourne at the end of 2014, having played a total of 149 VFL games for Sandringham, Casey and Port Melbourne, and returned to playing suburban football.
