= 1916 VFA season =

Australian rules football season

1916 VFA premiership season
- Premiers: Premiership not contested

The 1916 Victorian Football Association season was not played owing to World War I, which was at its peak at the time.

== Abandonment of the season ==
In February, the Association met to determine whether or not to contest the premiership during the season, in light of the need to support the war effort in Europe. The Association had curtailed the 1915 season five weeks early for the same reason.

At its first meeting on 7 February, the clubs were divided in opinion: Brighton, North Melbourne, Brunswick and Northcote were in favour of playing the season; Footscray, Hawthorn, Essendon and Williamstown were opposed; and Port Melbourne and Prahran were undecided. However, at the second meeting on 25 February, all clubs decided unanimously not to contest the premiership in 1916.

The Association resolved that its clubs should continue to operate, and could play matches for patriotic fund-raising purposes during the season. Many Association players moved into the Victorian Junior Football Association, which had before the war been the first level of junior football below the Association.
