= Warrawee Park =

Sports venue in Oakleigh, Victoria

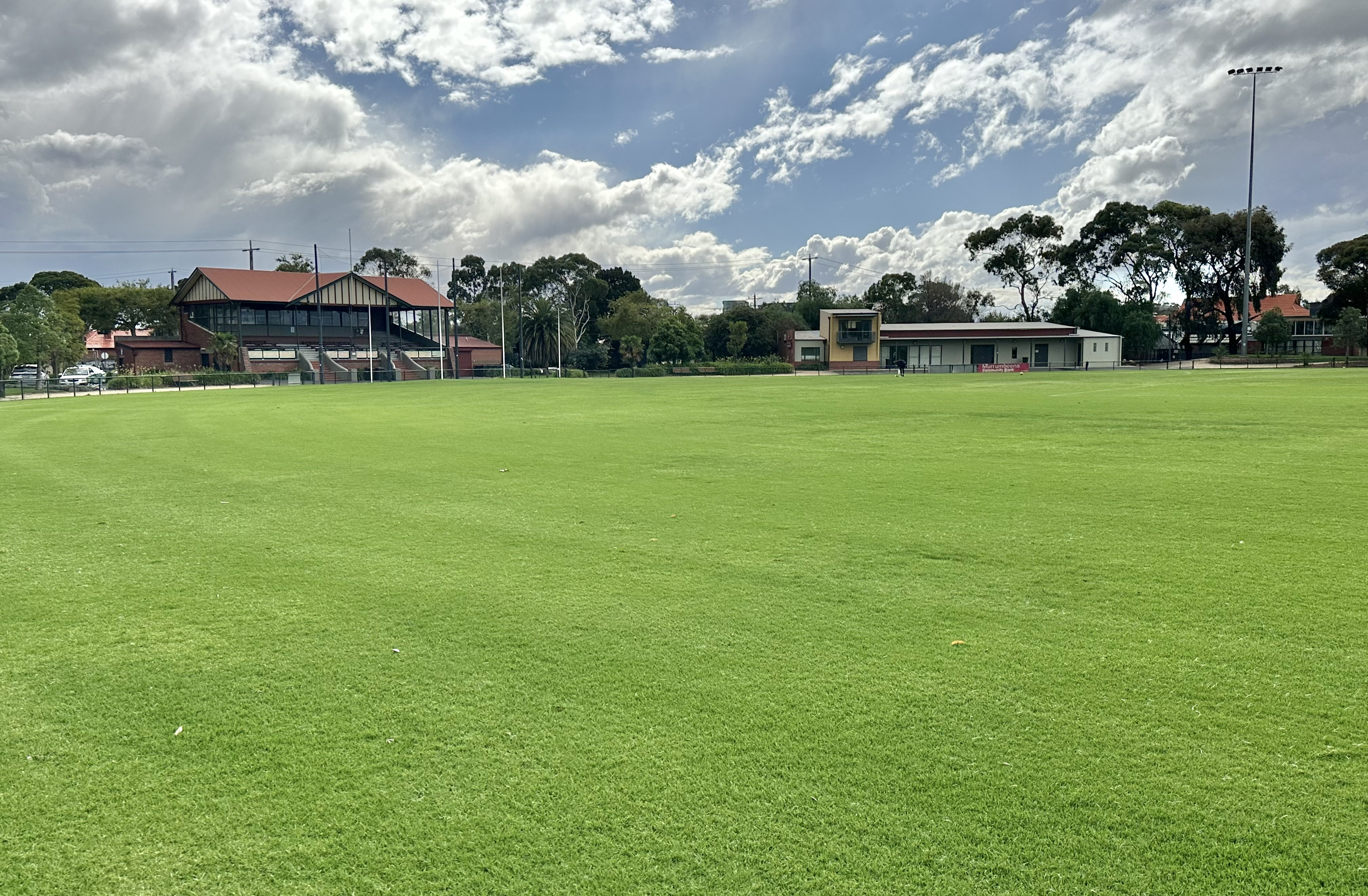
- Interactive map of Warrawee Park
- Location: Oakleigh, Victoria
- Coordinates: 37.8985°S 145.0893°E
- Owner: City of Monash
- Record attendance: 12,000 (three occasions)
- Field size: 177 m × 140 m (581 ft × 459 ft)

Construction
- Opened: 1915; 111 years ago

Tenants
- Oakleigh Chargers (Talent League); Oakleigh Cricket Club (VSDCA)

Warrawee Park (sometimes referred to as Warrawee Park Oval or the Oakleigh Football Ground) is an Australian rules football and cricket venue located in the Melbourne suburb of Oakleigh. The name also refers to the wider public park in which the oval is located.

As of 2025, it is home to the Oakleigh Chargers in the Talent League and the Oakleigh Cricket Club in the Victorian Sub-District Cricket Association (VSDCA).

== History ==
Warrawee Park was opened in 1915, using part of the land used by a local cemetery. The Oakleigh Football Club (nicknamed the "Devils"), which was competing in the Melbourne District Football Association (MDFA) at the time, played at the ground for one season when it first opened. The club returned to Warrawee Park when it joined the Victorian Football Association (VFA) in 1929.

During the Devils' time in the VFA, a record crowd of 12,000 people was achieved at Warrawee Park on three occasions – in 1930 against Port Melbourne, in 1951 against Sandringham, and in 1954 against Moorabbin.

Amid a restructure of the VFA, the Devils folded at the end of the 1994 season, with the Chargers formed to join the under-19s TAC Cup and playing its home matches at Warrawee Park.

The Oakleigh Amateur Football Club, which competes in the Victorian Amateur Football Association (VAFA) and is based at Scammell Reserve in Oakleigh South, has played occasional matches at Warrawee Park.
