= Camberwell Sports Ground =

Sports venue in Camberwell, Melbourne, Victoria

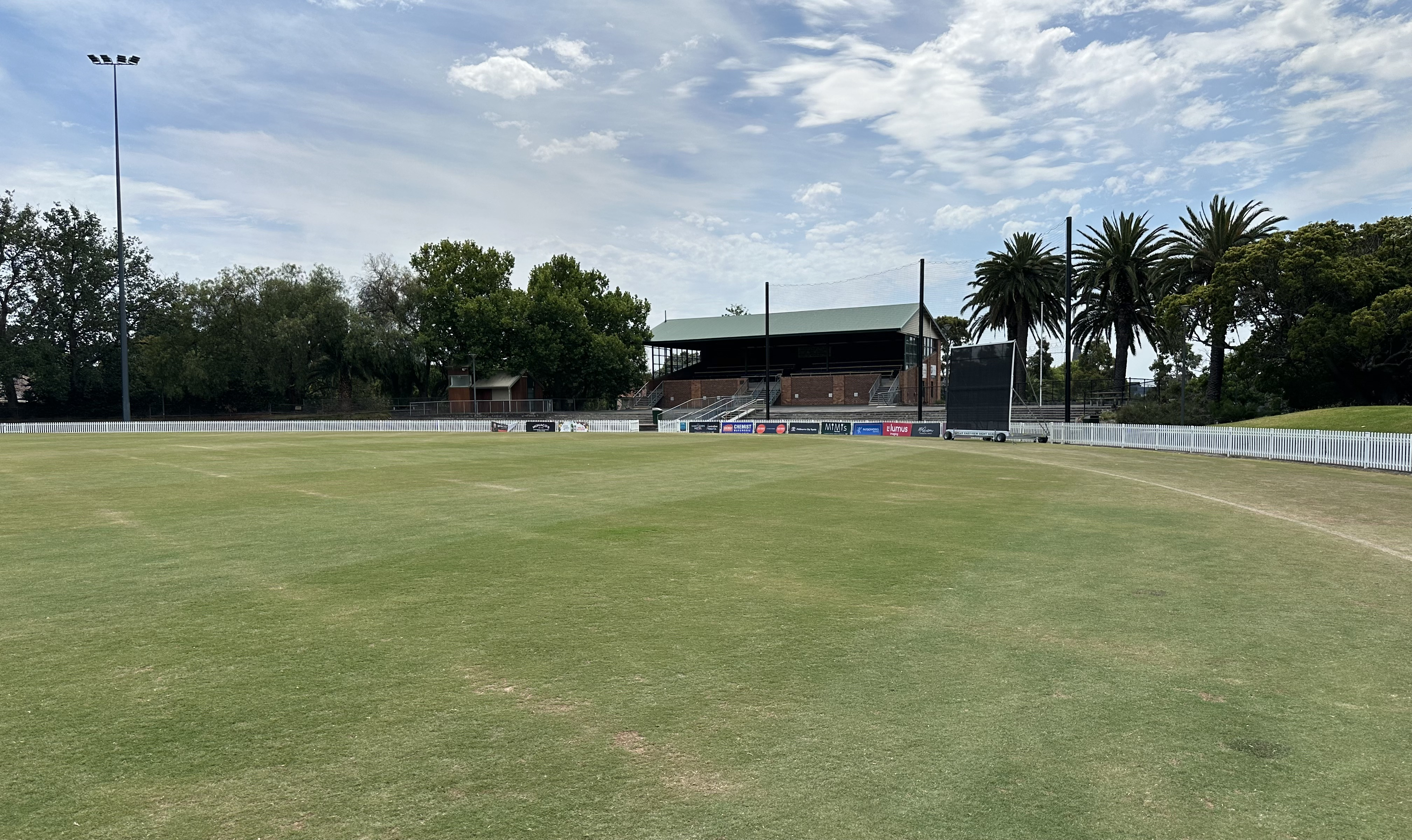
- Interactive map of Camberwell Sports Ground
- Address: 420 Camberwell Road; Camberwell, Victoria
- Coordinates: 37.8377°S 145.0628°E
- Owner: City of Boroondara
- Capacity: 5,000
- Record attendance: 14,000 (Camberwell vs Port Melbourne, 18 June 1945)
- Field size: 170 m × 130 m (560 ft × 430 ft)
- Public transit: ■ Trafalgar Road

Construction
- Opened: 1909; 117 years ago

Tenants
- Old Scotch Football Club (VAFA); Camberwell Magpies Cricket Club (VPC)

The Camberwell Sports Ground (CSG), sometimes stylised as the Camberwell Sportsground, is an Australian rules football and cricket venue in the Melbourne suburb of Camberwell. Since 2017, it has been known under naming rights as McQueen Financial Group Park (or simply McQueen Park).

As of 2026, the CSG is home to the Old Scotch Football Club in the Victorian Amateur Football Association (VAFA) and the Camberwell Magpies Cricket Club in the Victorian Premier Cricket (VPC) competition.

== History ==
The Camberwell Sports Ground was originally a vegetable garden known as "Brooks Paddock", and part of Camberwell Racecourse. The preparation of a new sports ground (originally dubbed "Bowen Park") on this site was finished in 1909 and the Camberwell Football Club first played at the new ground the in 1910. A grandstand for visitors' rooms (the "Tramways Grandstand") was built in 1920, with Camberwell joining the Victorian Football Association (VFA) in 1926. A much larger spectators' grandstand and pavilion was built in 1935, in time for the 1936 season.

An electric air raid siren was installed at the CSG on 4 August 1945 for a VFA match between Camberwell and Yarraville, replacing a bell which had been used until that point.

Camberwell played its final VFA match at the ground on 19 August 1990, before withdrawing from the VFA shortly before the start of the 1991 season. When the club played three seasons in the Victorian Amateur Football Association (VAFA), it was based at Macleay Park in Balwyn North and Rathmines Road Reserve in Hawthorn East.

In 2016, the CSG hosted two Women's Big Bash League (WBBL) matches, as the Melbourne Renegades could not play at Junction Oval because of its redevelopment. The Renegades also played the majority of its home matches during the 2017–18 season at the CSG.

Both grandstands at Camberwell Sports Ground were upgraded in 2020.
