= Shepley Oval =

Australian rules football and cricket venue

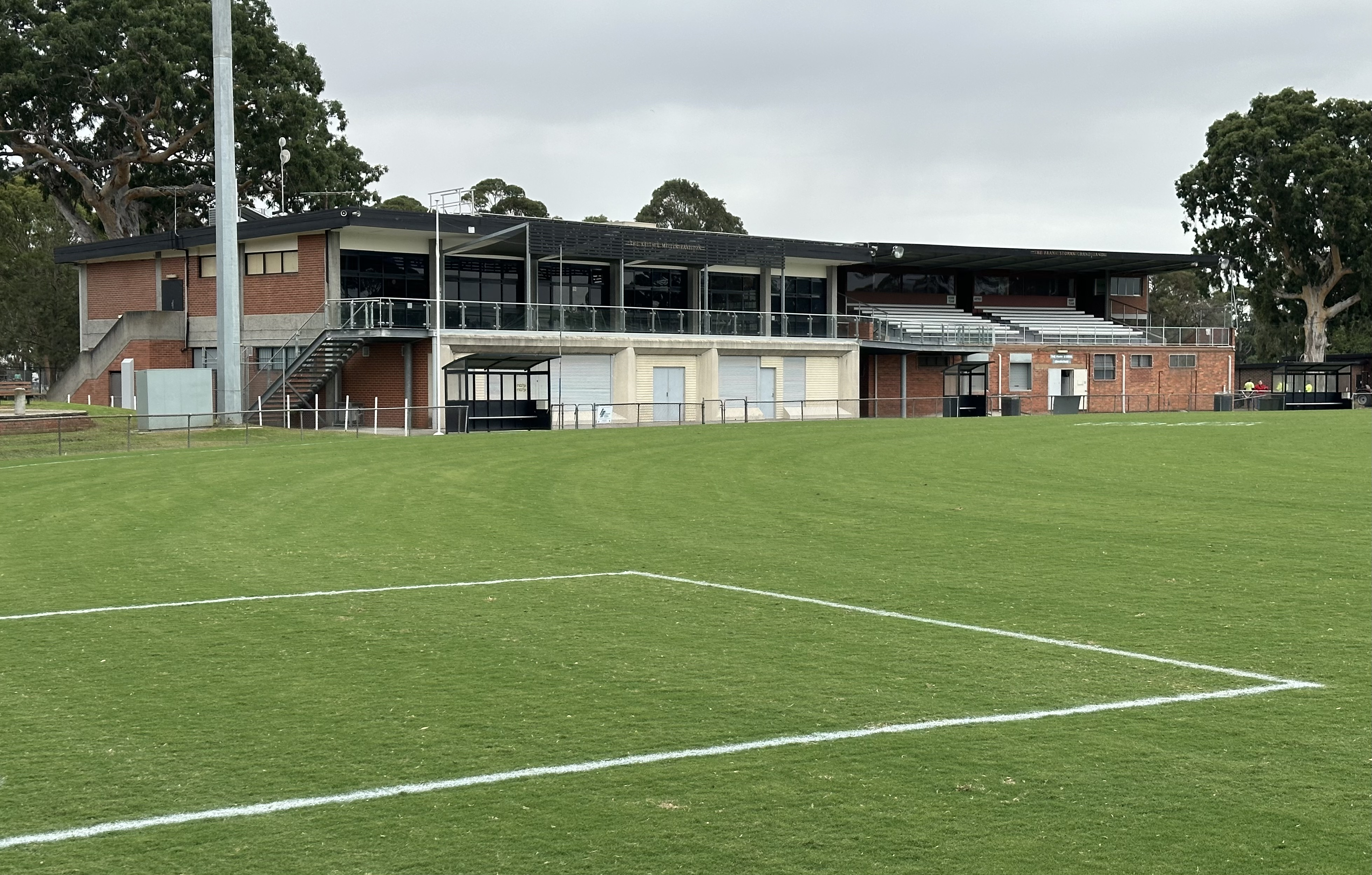
- Interactive map of Shepley Oval
- Address: Pultney St; Dandenong, Victoria
- Coordinates: 37°59′45″S 145°13′19″E
- Owner: City of Greater Dandenong
- Capacity: 4,000
- Field size: 166m × 120m

Tenants
- Dandenong Stingrays (TAC Cup); Dandenong Cricket Club (VPC); Dandenong Football Club (VFA, 1962–1994)

Shepley Oval is an Australian rules football and cricket venue located in the Melbourne suburb of Dandenong. It is the home of the Dandenong Stingrays in the Talent League and the Dandenong Cricket Club in the Victorian Premier Cricket (VPC) competition.

== History ==
Shepley Oval is located at the eastern end of Dandenong Park, immediately north of the Dandenong Creek. The parkland was used for sports in the late 19th century, but throughout the early half of the 20th century until the 1960s, the premier venue for sports in Dandenong was the Dandenong Showgrounds (which at that time was located in Clow Street, the site presently occupied by the Dandenong Municipal Offices). Shepley Oval was developed to a top standard oval in the late 1950s, with a grandstand being opened in 1959, and it has been the region's premier sports venue since the 1960s.

The venue's most historically notable football tenant is the Dandenong Football Club. Dandenong, which was then playing in the Victorian Football Association, moved its home ground from the Showgrounds to Shepley Oval in 1962, and played its games there until it folded at the end of the 1994 season. In 1995, the Southern Stingrays in Victoria's premier under-18s football competition, the TAC Cup, moved its home ground from Kavanagh Reserve, Mordialloc to Shepley Oval; the club has been since known as the Dandenong Stingrays, remains based at the ground as of 2025 and is now the main football tenant of the oval. Another notable football tenant of the ground was the Victorian Football League's Springvale Football Club, which played many of its games at the ground between 2000 and 2005, after it had left Springvale Reserve but before it moved to Casey Fields.

In the early 1960s, around the same time as the Dandenong Football Club moved to Shepley Oval, the Dandenong Sub-District Cricket Club was formed, and began playing its games at Shepley Oval during the summer. Top level district cricket first came to the venue in 1989, when the Waverley Cricket Club merged with Dandenong; the merged club, originally known as Waverley-Dandenong but now known as the Dandenong Cricket Club, has played its first XI and second XI cricket at Shepley Oval since; Wilson Oval, which is adjacent to Shepley Oval in Dandenong Park, serves as the third and fourth XI home ground.

The venue is named after former Dandenong Cricket Association secretary and president Harry Shepley. The oval has two main buildings: the Frank Storan Grandstand, named after the Dandenong cricket personality whose fundraising efforts facilitated its construction; and the Keith Miller Pavilion, named after the former Dandenong mayor, footballer and cricketer Keith Esmond Miller – not after former Australian Test cricketer and VFL footballer Keith Ross Miller, who was a much better known sportsman from Melbourne, but had no association with sport in Dandenong. The Keith Miller Pavilion underwent a $1.25 million re-development in 2014 to improve its training facilities. The ornate western gates were originally built at the Springvale Crematorium and were moved to Shepley Oval later.
