= 1915 VFA season =

1915 premiership season
- Teams: 10
- Premiers: North Melbourne; 5th premiership
- Minor premiers: North Melbourne; 4th minor premiership

The 1915 Victorian Football Association season was the 39th season of the Australian rules football competition.

The season was the first to be played while Australia was fighting in World War I, so the playing stocks of many teams were reduced by enlistments. The season itself was cut five weeks short to encourage more young men to enlist in the war effort. It was the last season played before the Association went into recess for two seasons during the peak of the war.

The premiership was won by the North Melbourne Football Club, after it defeated Brunswick by 48 points in the final on August 7. It was the club's fifth VFA premiership, and its second in a sequence of three premierships won consecutively between 1914 and 1918. North Melbourne won all fifteen premiership matches it played during 1915, becoming the first team to go undefeated through a season since Essendon (L.) in 1893; the season was part of a 58-match winning streak for North Melbourne which lasted from 1914 to 1919.

== Premiership ==
The home-and-home season was to have been played over eighteen rounds, with each club playing the others twice. However, fighting was intensifying in Europe as World War I escalated, and the perception at the time was that football was serving as a distraction which was dissuading men from enlisting to fight. As a result, the Association decided on 14 July to end the home-and-home season early after 13 matches, and proceed directly to the finals. The top four clubs contested a finals series under the amended Argus system to determine the premiers for the season.

=== Ladder ===
1915 VFA ladder
Pos	Team	Pld	W	L	D	PF	PA	PP	Pts
1	North Melbourne (P)	13	13	0	0	883	490	55.5	52
2	Brunswick	13	10	3	0	815	610	74.8	40
3	Williamstown	13	9	4	0	774	593	76.6	36
4	Port Melbourne	13	9	4	0	895	719	80.3	36
5	Prahran	13	8	4	1	724	684	94.5	34
6	Footscray	13	7	6	0	816	616	75.5	28
7	Northcote	13	3	8	2	746	792	106.2	16
8	Essendon	13	2	11	0	627	833	132.9	8
9	Brighton	13	1	11	1	627	1072	171.0	6
10	Hawthorn	13	1	12	0	678	1152	169.9	4

Rules for classification: 1) points; 2) percentage; 3) number of points for.
(P) Premiers

=== Finals ===
	Semi Finals
Saturday, 24 July	Brunswick 10.14 (74)	def.	Port Melbourne 8.8 (56)	North Melbourne Recreation Reserve (crowd: 6,000)
Saturday, 31 July	North Melbourne 11.14 (80)	def.	Williamstown 4.8 (32)	North Melbourne Recreation Reserve (crowd: 4,500)

1915 VFA Final
Saturday, 7 August	North Melbourne	def.	Brunswick	North Melbourne Recreation Reserve (crowd: 8,000)
2.6 (18); 4.8 (32); 9.9 (63); 11.10 (76)	Q1; Q2; Q3; Final	0.1 (1); 0.7 (7); 1.7 (13); 3.10 (28)	Umpires: Kendall
Miles 4, Hawkins 3, Dodemaide 2, Clarke, Rawle	Goals	Chase, Harker, O'Connor
Had Brunswick won, minor premiers North Melbourne would have been entitled to a rematch the following Saturday to decide the premiership.

== Notable events ==
- Following the 1914 season, a faction of the Northcote and Preston Football Club's committee advised the Association that the club would move its home venue from Croxton Park to Northcote Park, where a new grandstand had been opened; the club's executive, on the other hand, wanted to remain at Croxton Park. Amid the dispute, the Association voted by an 11–1 majority to recognise the Northcote Park faction, in large part because of improvements to Northcote Park and because Croxton Park had been notorious for more than a decade for the unruly conduct of its patrons, something which was generally blamed on the influence of the Croxton Park Hotel which adjoined the ground. The Association assisted to appoint a new committee, including members of the old committee who had favoured the move and members of the Northcote Cricket Club which also played at Northcote Park, and recognised the legitimacy of the new committee. Members of the ousted faction, including many players, established a new rival club called the City of Northcote Football Club, which played at Croxton Park in the Victorian Junior Football Association for the next four years.
- North Melbourne organised to play a match on August 14 against League team St Kilda, which had a bye in its premiership schedule that week, at the St Kilda Cricket Ground to raise money for Lady Stanley's Fund for Australian Wounded Soldiers. It was only the second time that a match had been played between the League and the Association since the breakaway of the League in 1897. Between 9,000–10,000 spectators attended, and £254/3/3 was raised. The football was played in bad spirit, and North Melbourne won 8.9 (57) to 4.7 (31) by 26 points.

== See also ==
- List of VFA premiers
