= 1967 VFA season =

Division 1
- Teams: 10
- Premiers: Dandenong; 1st D1 premiership
- Minor premiers: Dandenong; 2nd D1 minor premiership

Division 2
- Teams: 10
- Premiers: Oakleigh; 1st D2 premiership
- Minor premiers: Oakleigh; 1st D2 minor premiership

Attendance
- Matches played: 188
- Total attendance: 432,000 (2,298 per match)

The 1967 Victorian Football Association season was the 86th season of the top division of the Australian rules football competition, and the seventh season of second division competition. The Division 1 premiership was won by the Dandenong Football Club, after it defeated Port Melbourne in a controversial Grand Final on 24 September by 25 points; it was Dandenong's first Division 1 premiership. The Division 2 premiership was won by Oakleigh, in its first season after relegation from Division 1.

== Division 1 ==
The Division 1 home-and-home season was played over 18 rounds; the top four then contested the finals under the Page–McIntyre system. The finals were held for the first time at the Punt Road Oval, in Richmond.

=== Ladder ===
1967 VFA Division 1 Ladder
Pos	Team	Pld	W	L	D	PF	PA	PP	Pts
1	Dandenong (P)	18	14	4	0	1743	1464	119.1	56
2	Port Melbourne	18	13	5	0	1671	1426	117.2	52
3	Sandringham	18	11	7	0	1557	1494	104.2	44
4	Preston	18	10	8	0	1700	1625	104.6	40
5	Waverley	18	9	9	0	1388	1405	98.8	36
6	Coburg	18	9	9	0	1438	1470	97.8	36
7	Yarraville	18	8	10	0	1626	1550	104.9	32
8	Brunswick	18	8	10	0	1488	1602	92.9	32
9	Prahran	18	6	12	0	1333	1665	80.1	24
10	Williamstown	18	2	16	0	1380	1646	83.8	8

Rules for classification: 1) points; 2) percentage; 3) number of points for.
(P) Premiers

=== Finals ===
	Semi-finals
Sunday, 3 September	Sandringham 14.16 (100)	def.	Preston 13.12 (90)	Punt Road Oval (crowd: 9,500)
Sunday, 10 September	Dandenong 9.11 (65)	def. by	Port Melbourne 14.17 (101)	Punt Road Oval (crowd: 11,000)

	Preliminary Final
Sunday, 17 September	Dandenong 15.10 (100)	def.	Sandringham 11.15 (81)	Punt Road Oval (crowd: 11,000)

=== Grand Final ===
Dandenong won the Grand Final, which is best remembered for the controversial events of its second quarter. After seeing a free kick go against a teammate, Port Melbourne full forward John Peck approached and argued with umpire David Jackson. Jackson reported Peck for using abusive language and for disputing his decisions, and Peck repeatedly turned away from Jackson to prevent him from seeing his guernsey number to report him. Port Melbourne was already unhappy with the lopsided free kick count against it; and, after seeing this incident, Port Melbourne captain-coach Brian Buckley assembled his team to walk off the ground and forfeit the match in protest at Jackson's performance; much of the team had already reached the sidelines before Port Melbourne club officials ordered them to return to the ground. The rest of the game was played without incident, and Dandenong went on to win by 25 points.

1967 VFA Division 1 Grand Final
Sunday, 24 September	Port Melbourne	def. by	Dandenong	Punt Road Oval (crowd: 25,000)
3.1 (19); 7.5 (47); 10.11 (71); 12.12 (84)	Q1; Q2; Q3; Final	4.5 (29); 8.5 (53); 11.9 (75); 16.13 (109)	Umpires: David Jackson
Teague 4; Peck, Howell, Bedford 2; Brownhill, Ireland	Goals	Morrow 4; McDonald 3; Hill, Townsend, Miller 2; Smith, Melai, Mitchell
Gary Ireland, for striking Jim McNamara in the first quarter Graeme Taggart, for continued abusive language towards umpire David Jackson in the first quarter John Peck, for abusive language towards and disputing decisions of umpire David Jackson in the second quarter	Reports	Alan Osborne, for kicking Peter Bedford in the first quarter

=== Awards ===
- The leading goalkicker for the season was Johnny Walker (Preston), who kicked 80 goals during the home-and-home season.
- The J. J. Liston Trophy was won by Jim Sullivan (Coburg), who polled 38 votes. Paul Ladds (Sandringham) finished second with 27 votes, before he died in a car accident in the final week of the home-and-away season; Denis Dalton (Preston) and Rod Evans (Dandenong) were equal third with 22 votes.
- Waverley won the seconds premiership. Waverley 13.19 (97) defeated Preston 11.4 (70) in the Grand Final, played as a stand-alone match on Saturday 23 September at Skinner Reserve before a crowd of 300.

== Division 2 ==
The Division 2 home-and-home season was played over eighteen rounds; the top four then contested the finals under the Page–McIntyre system. All finals were played on Sundays at Coburg Oval, after having been played at Toorak Park from 1961 until 1966; crowds at Coburg were much lower than they had been at Toorak Park, and finals returned to Toorak Park in 1968.

=== Ladder ===
1967 VFA Division 2 ladder
Pos	Team	Pld	W	L	D	PF	PA	PP	Pts
1	Oakleigh (P)	18	14	4	0	1729	1404	123.1	56
2	Geelong West	18	13	5	0	1968	1425	138.1	52
3	Frankston	18	12	6	0	1715	1639	104.6	48
4	Sunshine	18	11	6	1	1570	1388	113.1	46
5	Northcote	18	11	7	0	1834	1577	116.3	44
6	Werribee	18	8	9	1	1564	1665	93.9	34
7	Mordialloc	18	7	11	0	1612	1633	98.7	28
8	Box Hill	18	6	12	0	1577	1815	86.9	24
9	Caulfield	18	4	14	0	1392	1751	79.5	16
10	Camberwell	18	3	15	0	1465	2129	68.8	12

Rules for classification: 1) points; 2) percentage; 3) number of points for.
(P) Premiers

=== Finals ===
	Semi-finals
Sunday, 20 August	Frankston 14.16 (100)	def.	Sunshine 8.14 (62)	Coburg Oval (crowd: 2,000)
Sunday, 27 August	Oakleigh 15.17 (107)	def.	Geelong West 11.4 (70)	Coburg Oval (crowd: 4,000)

	Preliminary Final
Sunday, 3 September	Geelong West 17.13 (115)	def.	Frankston 12.20 (92)	Coburg Oval (crowd: 2,500)

1967 VFA Division 2 Grand Final
Sunday, 10 September	Oakleigh	def.	Geelong West	Coburg Oval (crowd: 4,000)
3.3 (21); 5.4 (34); 9.10 (64); 12.14 (86)	Q1; Q2; Q3; Final	3.1 (19); 6.4 (40); 9.5 (59); 11.7 (73)	Umpires: David Jackson
Lothian 5, Cummins 2, Lyon 2, Haining, Jordan, Tegg	Goals	Nusteling 5, White 2, Bush, Hovey, O'Donnell, Stacey

=== Awards ===
- The leading goalkicker for Division 2 was Frank Power (Mordialloc) who kicked 84 goals for the season.
- The Division 2 Best and Fairest was originally won outright by Larry Rowe (Caulfield), who polled 22 votes, including seven first preferences; Colin Sleep (Northcote) originally finished in second place on a countback, polling 22 votes with five first preferences. However, following a decision in 1989, the countback was retrospectively eliminated, and both players are now recognized as joint Best and Fairest winners. Graeme Wapling (Oakleigh) was third with 19 votes.
- Northcote won the seconds premiership, defeating Sunshine in the Grand Final Replay. In the Grand Final on Saturday 9 September, Northcote 13.11 (89) drew Sunshine 13.11 (89); in the Grand Final Replay on Sunday 17 September, Northcote 13.12 (90) defeated Sunshine 10.8 (68). Both matches were stand-alone games played at Skinner Reserve.

== Notable events ==
=== Transfer fees ===
In early April, shortly before the start of the season, the Association Board on Management agreed by a 25–14 majority to impose a minimum transfer fee of $3,000 for any of its players. The fee was an attempt to stem the flow of young Association players to the Victorian Football League, and also to increase the financial reward to Association clubs for developing League-standard players if they did leave.

There were several problems which made the Association's move impractical. Outside the Association and among many clubs who had voted against the motion, the $3,000 price tag was considered to be outrageously and unrealistically high, considering that most of the players involved were young players being rated solely on their potential. Additionally, while transfer fees were an established practice in British and American football, there was not yet a formal transfer fee system within Australian football. Finally, the Victorian Football League's player payment laws (the "Coulter Laws") specifically prohibited the "buying" of players from other clubs – and therefore any club which paid a transfer fee to the Association would be in breach of League rules.

Shortly after the fee was imposed, the dissenting Association clubs led a campaign to repeal it, fearing reprisal from the League. True to these fears, the League Board of Management voted in late April to end its 1949 reciprocity agreement with the Association, allowing Association players to transfer directly to the League without a clearance; players who did so were suspended from the Association for five years, but the suspension was not recognised in the League. There were few such transfers over the following years, in part because players were reluctant to risk a five-year ban from the Association if they were never able to forge a successful League career. The highest profile move before the 1967 season was that of young Prahran centreman Kevin Sheedy, who went to Richmond without a clearance and without Prahran receiving any of the $5,000 transfer fee which was set for him.

On 5 May, the Association Board of Management agreed by an overwhelming majority to reduce the minimum transfer fee to $500 per player (with a maximum of $5,000), after an earlier motion to rescind the minimum transfer fee entirely failed to gain the two-thirds majority it required. Despite the change, its reciprocity agreement with the League was not reinstated. The transfer fee rule remained in place until April 1969.

=== Other notable events ===
- Starting from 1967, television channel ATV-0 (part of modern-day Network Ten) began to telecast Association games as part of its weekend sports coverage, in conjunction with its horse racing coverage. ATV-0 broadcast one live game on each Saturday and Sunday through the season, at a time when League games were generally televised only as partial replays. Over the following decade, the higher profile brought by television coverage resulted in a marked increase in the popularity of the Association, and attendances more than doubled between 1967 and 1975.
- On 30 July, in a rematch of the previous two Grand Finals, Port Melbourne 16.14 (110) defeated Waverley 14.16 (100) at Central Reserve, after having trailed 8.6 (54) to 13.15 (93) by 39 points at three-quarter time.

== See also ==
- List of VFA/VFL premiers
