= 1975 VFA season =

Division 1
- Teams: 10
- Premiers: Geelong West; 1st D1 premiership
- Minor premiers: Geelong West; 1st D1 minor premiership
- Relegated: Williamstown

Division 2
- Teams: 10
- Premiers: Brunswick; 1st D2 premiership
- Minor premiers: Brunswick; 1st D2 minor premiership

Attendance
- Matches played: 188
- Total attendance: 880,914

The 1975 Victorian Football Association season was the 94th season of the top division of the Australian rules football competition, and the 15th season of second division competition. The Division 1 premiership was won by the Geelong West Football Club, after it defeated Dandenong in the Grand Final on 21 September by 28 points; it was the first and only Division 1 premiership won by Geelong West in its time in the Association. The Division 2 premiership was won by Brunswick; it was Brunswick's first premiership in either division since 1938.

== Division 1 ==
The Division 1 home-and-away season was played over 18 rounds; the top four then contested the finals under the Page–McIntyre system. The finals were played at the St Kilda Cricket Ground.

=== Ladder ===
Pos	Team	Pld	W	L	D	PF	PA	PP	Pts
1	Geelong West (P)	18	15	3	0	2125	1596	133.1	60
2	Port Melbourne	18	14	4	0	2209	1680	131.5	56
3	Dandenong	18	12	6	0	1893	1690	112.0	48
4	Coburg	18	11	7	0	2051	1765	116.2	44
5	Preston	18	8	10	0	1831	1930	94.9	32
6	Prahran	18	8	10	0	1776	2070	85.8	32
7	Oakleigh	18	7	11	0	1795	2003	89.6	28
8	Caulfield	18	6	12	0	1919	2213	86.7	24
9	Sandringham	18	5	13	0	1758	1889	93.1	20
10	Williamstown	18	4	14	0	1599	2120	75.4	16

Rules for classification: 1) points; 2) percentage; 3) number of points for.
(P) Premiers

=== Finals ===
	Semi-finals
Sunday, 31 August	Dandenong 18.16 (124)	def.	Coburg 17.18 (120)	St Kilda Cricket Ground (crowd: 11,264)
Sunday, 7 September	Geelong West 16.17 (113)	def.	Port Melbourne 11.15 (81)	St Kilda Cricket Ground (crowd: 16,928)

	Preliminary Final
Sunday, 14 September	Port Melbourne 16.13 (109)	def. by	Dandenong 17.11 (113)	St Kilda Cricket Ground (crowd: 17,827)

1975 VFA Division 1 Grand Final
Sunday, 21 September	Geelong West	def.	Dandenong	St Kilda Cricket Ground (crowd: 27,582)
7.4 (46); 10.5 (65); 15.12 (102); 18.13 (121)	Q1; Q2; Q3; Final	1.2 (8); 6.7 (43); 7.7 (49); 14.9 (93)	Umpires: Rex Wenn
Radojevic 4, Wells 3, Bright 2, Lynch 2, Stephens 2, Yates 2, Gilmore, Hughes, Woolfe	Goals	Briese 3, Miller 3, Payze 2, Castricum, Flaherty, Hibbert, Moran, Orchard, Shinners
Reports	Walker, for striking Hughes in the second quarter Walker, for striking Lynch in the second quarter Shinners, for striking Manson in the second quarter Melai, for misconduct against Manson in the second quarter

=== Awards ===
- The leading goalkicker for the season was Joe Radojevic (Geelong West), who kicked 110 goals in the home-and-away season and 119 goals overall.
- The J. J. Liston Trophy was won by Derek King (Oakleigh), who polled 32 votes. King finished ahead of Peter Marshall (Preston), who finished second with 30 votes, and Alan Mannix (Coburg), who finished third with 24 votes.
- Coburg won the seconds premiership; it was the second consecutive season that Coburg had won the seconds premiership, with the first of those coming in Division 2. Coburg 17.13 (115) defeated Port Melbourne 9.13 (67) in the Grand Final, played as a stand-alone match on Saturday 13 September.
- Prahran won the lightning premiership. Prahran 7.2 (44) defeated Northcote 3.5 (23) in the Grand Final, played as a curtain-raiser to the senior Grand Final on Sunday 21 September.

== Division 2 ==
The Division 2 home-and-away season was played over eighteen rounds; the top four then contested the finals under the Page–McIntyre system; all finals were played on Sundays at Toorak Park.

=== Ladder ===
1975 VFA Division 2 Ladder
	TEAM	P	W	L	D	PF	PA	Pct	PTS
1	Brunswick (P)	18	15	3	0	2264	1565	144.6	60
2	Camberwell	18	13	4	1	2134	1622	131.5	54
3	Sunshine	18	13	5	0	2155	1679	128.3	52
4	Frankston	18	12	6	0	2088	1758	118.6	48
5	Northcote	18	12	6	0	2068	1991	101.8	48
6	Mordialloc	18	8	9	1	1752	1771	98.9	34
7	Yarraville	18	7	11	0	1937	2166	89.4	28
8	Waverley	18	6	12	0	2073	2180	95.0	24
9	Werribee	18	2	16	0	1429	2475	57.7	8
10	Box Hill	18	1	17	0	1578	2229	70.7	4
Key: P = Played, W = Won, L = Lost, D = Drawn, PF = Points For, PA = Points Against, Pct = Percentage; (P) = Premiers, PTS = Premiership points								Source	

=== Finals ===
	Semi-finals
Sunday, 17 August	Sunshine 17.15 (117)	def.	Frankston 13.15 (93)	Toorak Park
Sunday, 24 August	Brunswick 24.31 (175)	def.	Camberwell 14.14 (98)	Toorak Park (crowd: 11,268)

	Preliminary Final
Sunday, 31 August	Camberwell 15.12 (102)	def.	Sunshine 15.9 (99)	Toorak Park (crowd: 5,000)

1975 VFA Division 2 Grand Final
Sunday, 7 September	Brunswick	def.	Camberwell	Toorak Park (crowd: 9,000)
6.8 (44); 9.14 (68); 14.21 (105); 18.22 (130)	Q1; Q2; Q3; Final	1.3 (9); 5.4 (34); 9.7 (61); 12.11 (83)	Umpires: Rex Wenn
Baird 5, Brigham 2, O'Connor 2, Valentine 2, Warden 2, Laker, Nunn, Orton, Rowe, Woodham	Goals	Hammond 4, Stone 3, Kennedy 2, Andrews, Sauerberg, Simpson
Nunn (shoulder)	Injuries

=== Awards ===
- The leading goalkicker for Division 2 was Garry Hammond (Camberwell) who kicked 103 goals in the home-and-away season, and 112 goals overall.
- The J. Field Medal was won by Geoff Bryant (Box Hill), who polled 49 votes; it was Bryant's second Field medal in three years, each won by a considerable margin, and each won despite Box Hill finishing last on the ladder. Bryant finished ahead of Barry Nolan (Brunswick), who finished second with 26 votes, and George Stone (Camberwell), who finished third with 24 votes.
- Northcote won the seconds premiership. Northcote 15.18 (108) defeated Brunswick 13.12 (90) in the Grand Final on Saturday, 6 September.

== Notable events ==
=== Interleague matches ===
For the first time since 1968, and the first time since its expulsion from the Australian National Football Council, the Association played an interleague representative match. The match was played in Wangaratta against the Ovens and Murray Football League. The match was played during the lean half of a split-round in the Association fixture, and selection in the team was controversially limited to players from the twelve clubs which were idle that weekend – which automatically excluded 40% of Association players from eligibility. Colin Hobbs (Coburg) captained the team.

	1975 Interleague Matches
Sunday, 15 June	O&M 24.23 (167)	def.	V.F.A. 17.9 (111)	City Oval, Wangaratta

=== Other notable events ===
- On 18 May, Werribee ended a long losing streak against Frankston; Frankston had won its previous seventeen matches against Werribee.
- During the season, Sandringham became the first Association club to hold a full liquor licence.
- On 27 July, Northcote trailed Yarraville by 50 points at quarter time, before coming from behind to win by 32 points; Northcote 22.15 (147) d. Yarraville 17.13 (115).
- Camberwell opened the season with thirteen consecutive victories, but failed to win another home-and-away match season and fell to second on the ladder. It fared little better in the finals, barely holding on for a three-point preliminary final win after leading by 40 points during the final quarter, but losing its other two finals comfortably.
- Eighteen minutes into the final quarter of the Division 1 preliminary final, Port Melbourne led Dandenong by 22 points; Dandenong kicked four goals in the time that remained to steal the match by two points.

== See also ==
- List of VFA/VFL Premiers
