= 1974 VFA season =

Division 1
- Teams: 10
- Premiers: Port Melbourne; 10th D1 premiership
- Minor premiers: Port Melbourne; 9th D1 minor premiership

Division 2
- Teams: 10
- Premiers: Coburg; 2nd D2 premiership
- Minor premiers: Coburg; 2nd D2 minor premiership

The 1974 Victorian Football Association season was the 93rd season of the top division of the Australian rules football competition, and the 14th season of second division competition. The Division 1 premiership was won by the Port Melbourne Football Club, after it defeated Oakleigh in the Grand Final on 22 September by 69 points; it was Port Melbourne's tenth Division 1 premiership, drawing it level with Williamstown for the most Division 1 premierships in VFA history, and the first of six premierships won in nine seasons between 1974 and 1982. The Division 2 premiership was won by Coburg in its first season after being relegated from Division 1; it was Coburg's second Division 2 premiership.

== Division 1 ==
The Division 1 home-and-away season was played over 18 rounds; the top four then contested the finals under the Page–McIntyre system. The finals were played at the St Kilda Cricket Ground.

=== Ladder ===
1974 VFA Division 1 Ladder
	TEAM	P	W	L	D	PF	PA	Pct	PTS
1	Port Melbourne (P)	18	13	5	0	2028	1592	127.3	52
2	Geelong West	18	13	5	0	1888	1512	124.8	52
3	Dandenong	18	12	6	0	1924	1500	128.2	48
4	Oakleigh	18	11	7	0	1948	1760	110.6	48
5	Prahran	18	11	7	0	1855	1747	106.1	44
6	Preston	18	9	9	0	1673	1793	93.3	36
7	Williamstown	18	9	9	0	1607	1873	85.7	36
8	Sandringham	18	5	13	0	1495	1912	78.1	20
9	Caulfield	18	4	14	0	1722	2010	85.6	16
10	Sunshine	18	3	15	0	1561	2002	77.9	12
Key: P = Played, W = Won, L = Lost, D = Drawn, PF = Points For, PA = Points Against, Pct = Percentage; (P) = Premiers, PTS = Premiership points								Source	

=== Finals ===
	Semi-finals
Sunday, 1 September	Dandenong 13.18 (96)	def. by	Oakleigh 13.19 (97)	St Kilda Cricket Ground (crowd: 13,500)
Sunday, 8 September	Port Melbourne 16.14 (110)	def.	Geelong West 11.21 (87)	St Kilda Cricket Ground (crowd: 15,520)

	Preliminary Final
Sunday, 15 September	Geelong West 13.9 (87)	def. by	Oakleigh 16.16 (112)	St Kilda Cricket Ground (crowd: 12,100)

1974 VFA Division 1 Grand Final
Sunday, 22 September	Port Melbourne	def.	Oakleigh	St Kilda Cricket Ground (crowd: 23,936)
5.4 (34); 10.10 (70); 17.15 (117); 22.20 (152)	Q1; Q2; Q3; Final	3.3 (21); 6.7 (43); 8.13 (61); 11.17 (83)	Umpires: John Gambetta
Cook 10, Brown 4, Holt 3, Anderson, Behan, Buckley, Harland, P. Goss	Goals	Moore 4, Cloke 3, J. Lilley, Quinn, Ritterman, Tessoriero
Herrod (bruised kidneys); Holt (ankle); Lockhart (cut eye); Critch (compound fracture of finger)	Injuries
Reports	Quinn, for striking Lockhart

=== Awards ===
- The leading goalkicker for the season was Jim Miller (Dandenong), who kicked 74 goals in the home-and-away season and 79 goals overall.
- The J. J. Liston Trophy was won by Ray Goold (Sunshine), who polled 33 votes. Goold finished ahead of Les Stillman (Williamstown), who finished second with 32 votes, and Graeme Allan (Sunshine), who finished third with 28 votes.
- Port Melbourne won the seconds premiership for the third consecutive season. Port Melbourne 14.8 (92) defeated Preston 11.14 (80) in the Grand Final, played as a stand-alone match on Saturday 14 September.
- Preston won the lightning premiership. Preston 6.2 (38) defeated Prahran 5.3 (33) in the Grand Final, played as a curtain-raiser to the senior Grand Final on Sunday 22 September.

== Division 2 ==
The Division 2 home-and-away season was played over eighteen rounds; the top four then contested the finals under the Page–McIntyre system; all finals were played on Sundays at Toorak Park.

=== Ladder ===
1974 VFA Division 2 Ladder
	TEAM	P	W	L	D	PF	PA	Pct	PTS
1	Coburg (P)	18	17	1	0	2591	1431	181.0	68
2	Waverley	18	15	3	0	2143	1631	131.3	60
3	Brunswick	18	14	4	0	2156	1660	134.2	56
4	Camberwell	18	10	8	0	1874	1752	112.0	40
5	Northcote	18	9	9	0	1863	1958	95.1	36
6	Frankston	18	8	10	0	1867	2276	82.0	32
7	Mordialloc	18	6	12	0	1833	2039	89.9	24
8	Box Hill	18	4	14	0	1640	2190	66.6	16
9	Werribee	18	4	14	0	1631	2185	74.1	16
10	Yarraville	18	3	15	0	1601	2032	78.7	12
Key: P = Played, W = Won, L = Lost, D = Drawn, PF = Points For, PA = Points Against, Pct = Percentage; (P) = Premiers, PTS = Premiership points								Source	

=== Finals ===
	Semi-finals
Sunday, 18 August	Brunswick 12.8 (80)	def.	Camberwell 11.12 (78)	Toorak Park (crowd: 8,000)
Sunday, 25 August	Coburg 19.19 (133)	def.	Waverley 8.9 (57)	Toorak Park (crowd: 10,000)

	Preliminary Final
Sunday, 1 September	Waverley 16.13 (109)	def. by	Brunswick 16.22 (118)	Toorak Park (crowd: 6,000)

1974 VFA Division 2 Grand Final
Sunday, 8 September	Coburg	def.	Brunswick	Toorak Park (crowd: 11,000)
4.3 (27); 8.7 (55); 13.12 (90); 18.17 (125)	Q1; Q2; Q3; Final	3.5 (23); 6.10 (46); 9.13 (67); 9.15 (69)	Umpires: John Gambetta
Smith 8, Breen 3, Paul 3, Hobbs 2, Morrison, Gait	Goals	Orton 3, Baird 2, Wrout 2, Joseph, Stilo
Gale (leg)	Injuries	Ford (arm)

=== Awards ===
- The leading goalkicker for Division 2 was Peter Smith (Coburg) who kicked 101 goals in the home-and-away season, and 121 goals overall.
- The J. Field Medal was won by Ron Allen (Waverley), who polled 45 votes. Allen finished ahead of Jim Johnstone (Mordialloc), who polled 30 votes, and Mick Martin (Yarraville), who polled 30 votes and finished third on countback.
- Coburg won the seconds premiership. Coburg 24.13 (157) defeated Camberwell 14.18 (102) in the Grand Final at Northcote Park on Saturday, 7 September.

== Notable events ==
- On 14 April, Box Hill defeated Mordialloc by 13 points, ending a 25-game losing streak which dated back to 1972.
- On 4 August, 64-year-old Sandringham trainer Ray Patmore abused and then struck field umpire Graeme Huggins during a match. He was fined $50 for the abusive language, and suspended for ten years for the striking charge.
- In the final round of the home-and-away season, Caulfield and Sunshine played off in a match which directly determined which club was relegated. Caulfield 20.21 (141) defeated Sunshine 13.10 (88) to hold its place in the top division.

== See also ==
- List of VFA/VFL premiers
