= 1967 VFA Grand Final =

1967 VFA Division 1 Grand Final

Port Melbourne	Dandenong
12.12 (84)	16.13 (109)
- Date: 24 September 1967
- Stadium: Punt Road Oval, Melbourne, Victoria

Broadcast in Australia
- Network: ATV-0

The 1967 VFA Division 1 Grand Final was an Australian rules football match played between the Dandenong Redlegs and the Port Melbourne Borough. The match was held on Sunday 24 September 1967 at the Punt Road Oval in Jolimont, Melbourne, to decide the Division 1 Premiership for the 1967 Victorian Football Association season.

The match was described by historian John Devaney as "indisputably one of the most infamous matches in Australian football history". after Port Melbourne captain-coach Brian Buckley nearly led his team off the field in protest at the performance of umpire David Jackson. Dandenong went on to win the game 16.13 (109) to 12.12 (84), securing the first Division 1 premiership in Dandenong's history.

== Background ==
The Dandenong Football Club had joined the VFA less than ten years earlier, and had been promoted from Division 2 to Division 1 after 1962. Port Melbourne had been in the VFA since the 1880s, and had been regular finalists since the end of World War II. Port Melbourne was the defending Division 1 premier, and had contested the previous three Grand Finals.

Dandenong and Port Melbourne played each other twice during the 1967 home-and-away season. In Round 1, Port Melbourne defeated Dandenong by eight points, 14.14 (98) to 13.12 (90), with full-forward John Peck, on debut for Port Melbourne, scoring six goals; in the return match, in tough, muddy conditions, Dandenong defeated Port Melbourne by four points, 8.15 (63) to 9.5 (59), with Jim Miller kicking four goals for Dandenong.

At the end of the home and away season, Dandenong finished on top of the ladder, with Port Melbourne second. Dandenong entered the second semi-final as narrow favourites to win, but Port Melbourne won the match by 26 points, 14.7 (91) to 9.11 (65). Dandenong faced Sandringham in the preliminary final, winning 15.10 (100) to 11.15 (81), to progress to the Division 1 Grand Final for the first time in club history.

In the lead-up to the Preliminary Final, Dandenong captain-coach Alan Morrow had invited Allan Jeans, then the senior coach at the VFL's St Kilda Football Club, to lead a training session, which was focussed on maximising the team's physical strength; the session was described by players as one of the toughest the team had faced during the season. Following the success of this, Jeans was invited to sit on the Dandenong bench during the Grand Final, to allow Morrow to concentrate more fully on the play.

The field umpire for the match was David Jackson. The match was played at the Punt Road Oval, a neutral venue. The attendance of the match is unclear, as it was reported to be 17,000 in The Age, and 25,000 in the Sun News-Pictorial. It was the first VFA Grand Final to be televised, as ATV-0 had secured broadcast rights for the Association at the start of that year.

== The game ==
=== First half ===
The beginning of the match was a tough, physical, and oftentimes violent encounter. Dandenong had the better of play through the first quarter, assisted in large part by captain-coach and ruckman Alan Morrow, who controlled the ruck contests, and provided a valuable forward option when resting; Dandenong followers David Sheehan and Alan McDonald provided much of the midfield drive from those ruck contests, and Dandenong centre Rod Evans kept the highly regarded young Port Melbourne rover Peter Bedford quiet. Dandenong led by ten points at quarter time, 4.5 (29) to 3.1 (19).

Off the ball, brawls regularly broke out between the two sides. On many occasions, umpires, trainers and other officials were forced to enter the arena to break up the fights. Three players were reported in the first quarter: Dandenong's Alan Osborne was reported for kicking Bedford; Port Melbourne's Gary Ireland was reported for striking Jim McNamara; and Port Melbourne's Graeme Taggart was reported for using continuous abusive language towards umpire David Jackson. The fighting continued into the second quarter of the match.

==== Walk-off ====
Midway through the second quarter, after a free kick was paid against a team-mate, Port Melbourne's John Peck approached and argued with Jackson. At this stage, Port Melbourne was on the wrong end of a lopsided free kick count – by half time, Dandenong had received 26 free kicks to Port Melbourne's nine – and Peck had been penalised more than most. In an incident which lasted three minutes, Peck continued to argue with Jackson, and Jackson reported Peck for using abusive language and disputing his decisions; as Jackson attempted to look at the back of Peck's guernsey to take his number, Peck repeatedly walked away to prevent Jackson from doing so.

Port Melbourne captain-coach Brian Buckley, who was near to Jackson and Peck during this altercation, ordered his players to leave the field in protest at Jackson's performance. Half of the team had reached the boundary, as Jackson prepared to restart play anyway, before Port Melbourne secretary Norm Goss Sr. and treasurer John Paton ordered them to return to the field and continue playing.

Dandenong led by nineteen points at the time of the incident, and Port Melbourne closed the deficit to only six points at half time, Dandenong leading 8.5 (53) to 7.5 (47).

=== Second half ===
Port Melbourne played the better football in the third quarter of the match; Bedford was able to overcome Evans' defensive effort and provide a good drive out of the midfield for Port Melbourne, and backmen John Caulfield and Geoff Grover improved after leaving their men too loose in the first half. Midway through the quarter, Port Melbourne led by seven points, a 26-point turnaround since the walk-off. Dandenong then kicked late goals to take a four-point lead into three-quarter time, 11.9 (75) to 10.11 (71).

Dandenong dominated the final quarter of the match, kicking five quick goals to put the game beyond Port Melbourne's reach. Dandenong's half forward flankers, John Townsend and Brian Hill, were dominant, and Dandenong's physical strength through the game was reported to have left Port Melbourne too tired to remain competitive in the final quarter. The final margin was 25 points, with Dandenong winning 16.13 (109) to 12.12 (84).

=== Overall ===
Both the Age reporter Michael de Kretser and the Sun News-Pictorial reporter Chris de Kretser agreed that, while the scores had been close for much of the match, Dandenong was clearly the better team overall. Michael de Kretser described it as "the toughest Grand Final for years". Dandenong had an important input from its two ruckmen, Morrow and Eddie Melai, who were strong in the midfield and contributed seven goals between them while resting in the forward line. There was no obvious choice as best player on the ground, with different sources considering Morrow or Hugh Mitchell to be Dandenong's best player, and Caulfield, Ireland or Jim Renouf to be best for Port Melbourne.

== Aftermath ==
In the immediate aftermath of the match, Jackson's umpiring performance, particularly in relation to Peck, was the main point of discussion. Jackson was reported to have paid a total of fourteen free kicks against Peck in the match, as many as thirteen of which may have come in the first half.

=== John Peck ===
Peck was a new recruit for Port Melbourne in 1967. At age 29, he was an established star player in the more popular and higher quality Victorian Football League. He had requested a transfer from his club, Hawthorn, to Port Melbourne, believing that he would be able to prolong his career for a further four or five years in the Association. Peck was one of the highest profile League players to switch to the Association since the 1940s, having played more than 200 games with Hawthorn, and having been the League leading goalkicker in 1963, 1964 and 1965.

Throughout the season, Peck had been consistently frustrated by the Association umpires, frequently conceding many more free kicks than he received; Goss stated that Grand Final emergency umpire Alan O'Neil was the only umpire who had "given Peck a fair go" during the season. This opinion was also held by some outside of the Port Melbourne Football Club; future Hall of Fame football writer Alf Brown of the Herald had noted this during the year, and speculated that the Association umpires may have been showing bias against Peck because he was such a well-established League player – in Brown's exact words, "we'll show this League slicker he is not going to put anything over us."

Immediately following the Grand Final, Peck told Port Melbourne officials that he felt he had been umpired out of the game, and that he intended to retire immediately, but Goss convinced him to stay on; he ultimately retired at the end of 1968.

=== David Jackson ===
Jackson's umpiring performance was the subject of much discussion, both positive and negative. Those reporting on the game agreed that Jackson had made many errors in Dandenong's favour, with Chris de Kretser describing some of his decisions against Port Melbourne in the second quarter as "shocking", and The Sporting Globe reporter Jim Blake agreeing that Jackson had made several mistakes during the game. However, Blake also praised Jackson for his courage in upholding his decisions even when the walk-off threatened to draw the game into either chaos or farce; Dandenong captain-coach Alan Morrow agreed with Blake's praise for Jackson in the difficult situation.

Port Melbourne voiced its displeasure at Jackson's performance, and somebody at the club reportedly went as far as telling the media that "the umpiring was so poor that it upset Port's players, and put VFA football back ten years." However, Port Melbourne did not attempt to lodge any sort of formal complaint against Jackson.

In a separate incident early in the second quarter, and prior to the walk-off, Jackson was knocked unconscious in an accidental collision with Dandenong's Eddie Melai. The collision occurred when Melai, who was running downfield to follow the play, ran into Jackson, who had suddenly stopped and turned to follow a brawl which had just started. Smelling salts were used to wake Jackson up, and he was able to continue umpiring; it has never been suggested that his performance was impaired by after-effects from the collision.

=== Fred Allen ===
VFA umpires adviser, Fred Allen, controversially spoke out against the Port Melbourne Football Club for the walk-off, describing the conduct as "disgraceful, undisciplined and unsporting", and stating "when a side is influenced from outside the fence to leave the ground it is beyond my comprehension." Port Melbourne lodged a formal complaint against Allen for the comment, and secretary Norm Goss made it clear that the decision to lead the walk-off was entirely that of onfield captain-coach Brian Buckley, and that it was the club's off-field personnel who in fact prevented the walk-off from being completed. Goss also pointed out that the players believed the walk-off was justified, and were unhappy with him for averting it.

== Match day reports ==
The VFA commission meeting to address the four match-day reports was held on 3 October, more than a week after the match. Anticipating a hostile response from Port Melbourne in the event of findings against its players, the commission requested two policemen to attend the hearing; Goss considered this to be insulting towards his club.

In the hearing, Peck pleaded "not guilty under severe provocation" to abusing Jackson and disputing his decisions; he had intended to plead "guilty under severe provocation" to disputing decisions, and not guilty to using abusive language, but was forced to enter a single plea for the entire charge. Jackson testified that Peck had disputed his decisions four times, used abusive language fourteen times, and impeded him from taking his number six times. Buckley, who had been in vicinity of the incident for much of its duration, and Peck both testified that no abusive language had been used, and that Peck had been seeking clarification on the decision, rather than disputing it. The commission did not believe that Jackson had lied, and suspended Peck for six matches; in handing down the penalty, the commission stated that it recognised that it was severe, but considered it to be justified. When the suspension was handed down, Port Melbourne team advocate Charles Chrimes stood up and loudly denounced the commission, accusing it of being biased against his club, and shouting "Peck has been victimised out of VFA football", before slamming his chair against the table and storming out.

Port Melbourne's other two players facing charges were also suspended: Graeme Taggart was suspended for three matches for abusing Jackson, and Gary Ireland was suspended for two matches for striking. Dandenong's only reported player, Alan Osborne, was cleared of his kicking charge.

== Legacy ==
This game has become one of the most well-known and controversial events in VFA/VFL history. In 2008, it was recognised as one of the 150 greatest moments in Australian rules football history in a list compiled by the Australian Football League to celebrate the 150th anniversary of the establishment of the sport.

Some sources written decades after the match give a different interpretation of the game, and indicate that it was only after the incident between Jackson and Peck which sparked the walk-off that Peck began to concede free kicks – conveying an implication that Jackson deliberately umpired Peck out of the game as retribution. That version of events was given in a 1989 edition of the Recorder, and on the AFL's 150 Greatest Moments website. However, all newspaper reports from 1967 dispute this, and indicate that both Peck and Port Melbourne were already well behind on the free kick count when the walk-off occurred.

Had Port Melbourne followed through with its walk-off, it would have been the second time a VFA team had forfeited its chance to contest the premiership in protest of umpiring. In 1904, minor premiers Richmond refused to play a challenge final against North Melbourne because of the appointment of umpire Allen to the match. In that case, both the Richmond players and committee were in favour of forfeiting the game, and the major premiership was awarded to North Melbourne.

1967 VFA Division 1 Grand Final
24 September 2:30pm	Port Melbourne	def. by	Dandenong	Punt Road Oval (crowd: 17,000 or 25,000)
3.1 (19); 7.5 (47); 10.11 (71); 12.12 (84)	Q1; Q2; Q3; Final	4.5 (29); 8.5 (53); 11.9 (75); 16.13 (109)	Umpires: David Jackson
Teague 4; Peck, Howell, Bedford 2; Brownhill, Ireland	Goals	Morrow 4; McDonald 3; Hill, Townsend, Miller 2; Smith, Melai, Mitchell
Gary Ireland, for striking Jim McNamara in the first quarter Graeme Taggart, for continued abusive language towards umpire David Jackson in the first quarter John Peck, for abusive language towards and disputing decisions of umpire David Jackson in the second quarter	Reports	Alan Osborne, for kicking Peter Bedford in the first quarter

== Grand Final teams ==
Port Melbourne Football Club
Back line	George Griffiths; 21 years 175.3 cm; 76.2 kg	Geoff Grover; 24 years 188 cm; 85.7 kg	Barry Bonnett; 23 years 188 cm; 83.5 kg
Half back line	Barry Schmidt; 23 years 175.3 cm; 76.2 kg	John Caulfield; 22 years 183 cm; 79.8 kg	Jim Renouf; 27 years 180.3 cm; 85.7 kg
Centre Line		Peter Bedford; 20 years 177.8 cm; 76.2 kg	
Half forward line	Gary Brice; 18 years 180.3 cm; 73 kg	Gary Ireland; 24 years 188 cm; 78.9 kg	Bob Brownhill; 23 years 180.3 cm; 82.6 kg
Forward line	Phil Rowlands; 19 years 189.2 cm; 88.9 kg	Peter Howell; 24 years 188 cm; 79.8 kg	Barry Teague; 21 years 170.2 cm; 67.1 kg
Rucks	John Peck; 29 years 188 cm; 89.8 kg	Brian Buckley; 32 years 185.4 cm; 82.6 kg	Graeme Taggart; 26 years 167.6 cm; 66.2 kg
Reserves	Malcolm Allen; 20 years 181.6 cm; 76.2 kg	Gary Williams; 24 years 180.3 cm; 86.2 kg	
Captain-coach	Brian Buckley		

Dandenong Football Club
Back line	Ken Whitehead; 22 years 172.7 cm; 73 kg	Jim McNamara; 21 years 188 cm; 93.51 kg	Hugh Mitchell; 32 years 183 cm; 78.9 kg
Half back line	Bruce Barron; 23 years 185.4 cm; 92.1 kg	Peter Stedwell; 22 years 185.4 cm; 84.8.1 kg	Lindsay Staunton; 27 years 177.8 cm; 77.6 kg
Centre Line		Rod Evans; 21 years 177.8 cm; 76.2 kg	
Half forward line	John Townsend; 21 years 183 cm; 74.4 kg	Bruce Smith; 22 years 188 cm; 82.6 kg	Brian Hill; 26 years 175.3 cm; 65.3 kg
Forward line	David Sheehan; 20 years 165 cm; 63.5 kg	Jim Miller; 23 years 183.2 cm; 90.3 kg	Eddie Melai; 26 years 193 cm; 92.1 kg
Rucks	Alan Morrow; 30 years 183 cm; 88.9 kg	Alan Osborne; 26 years 188 cm; 88.9 kg	Alan McDonald; 21 years 175.3 cm; 71.7 kg
Reserves	Hubert Savory	Barry Jeffries; 18 years 183 cm; 90.7 kg	
Captain-coach	Alan Morrow		

The field umpire was David Jackson; and the emergency umpire was Alan O'Neil.
