= 1971 VFA season =

Division 1
- Teams: 10
- Premiers: Dandenong; 2nd D1 premiership
- Minor premiers: Preston; 3rd D1 minor premiership

Division 2
- Teams: 10
- Premiers: Sunshine; 1st D2 premiership
- Minor premiers: Caulfield; 1st D2 minor premiership

The 1971 Victorian Football Association season was the 90th season of the top division of the Australian rules football competition, and the eleventh season of second division competition. The Division 1 premiership was won by the Dandenong Football Club, after it defeated Preston in the Grand Final on 26 September by six points, and after a formal protest by Preston against the result of the Grand Final was dismissed on 29 September; it was Dandenong's second Division 1 premiership. The Division 2 premiership was won by Sunshine; it was the club's first and only premiership in either division in its time in the Association, and came in its ninth consecutive appearance in the Division 2 finals.

== Division 1 ==
The Division 1 home-and-home season was played over 18 rounds; the top four then contested the finals under the Page–McIntyre system. The finals were played at the St Kilda Cricket Ground.

=== Ladder ===
1971 VFA Division 1 Ladder
	TEAM	P	W	L	D	PF	PA	Pct	PTS
1	Preston	18	13	4	1	1943	1608	120.8	54
2	Dandenong (P)	18	12	6	0	2067	1668	123.9	48
3	Oakleigh	18	12	6	0	2110	1939	108.8	48
4	Sandringham	18	10	8	0	1852	1821	101.7	40
5	Prahran	18	8	9	1	1768	1897	93.2	34
6	Port Melbourne	18	8	10	0	1788	1855	96.6	32
7	Coburg	18	7	11	0	1781	1810	98.3	28
8	Waverley	18	7	11	0	1694	1948	86.9	28
9	Williamstown	18	6	12	0	1812	2000	90.6	24
10	Geelong West	18	6	12	0	1833	2101	87.2	24
Key: P = Played, W = Won, L = Lost, D = Drawn, PF = Points For, PA = Points Against, Pct = Percentage; (P) = Premiers, PTS = Premiership points								Source	

=== Finals ===
	Semi-finals
Sunday, 5 September	Oakleigh 15.17 (107)	def. by	Sandringham 21.7 (133)	St Kilda Cricket Ground (crowd: 12,000)
Sunday, 12 September	Preston 11.15 (81)	def. by	Dandenong 24.11 (155)	St Kilda Cricket Ground (crowd: 12,500)

	Preliminary Final
Sunday, 19 September	Preston 17.17 (119)	def.	Sandringham 14.21 (105)	St Kilda Cricket Ground (crowd: 12,000)

=== Grand Final ===
Dandenong defeated Preston in the Grand Final by six points. However, following the match, Preston formally protested the result, on the grounds that umpire Jim McMaster had paid a free kick to Dandenong full-forward Jim Miller, from which a goal was scored, before the opening bounce was executed and therefore before the game had officially begun – which Preston contended made the free kick invalid and the resultant goal void. Preston's protest was heard by the Board of Management on the evening of Wednesday 29 September, and was dismissed by an overwhelming majority, formally confirming Dandenong as premiers.

1971 VFA Division 1 Grand Final
Sunday, 26 September	Dandenong	def.	Preston	St Kilda Cricket Ground (crowd: 14,529)
7.8 (50); 10.8 (68); 12.12 (84); 14.14 (98)	Q1; Q2; Q3; Final	3.4 (22); 8.6 (54); 9.9 (63); 13.14 (92)	Umpires: Jim McMaster
Miller 5, Ellis 2, Flaherty 2, Orchard 2, Evans, Hibbert, Reid	Goals	Saltmarsh 4, Telford 2, Allen, Ashmead, Dickson, Goad, Ireland, McCarthy, Martin
Lyall Henriksen, for striking Greg Goad in the third quarter Jim Miller, for striking Bert Thornley in the third quarter	Reports	Robert Ireland, for striking Lyall Henriksen in the third quarter
Preston unsuccessfully protested to have the result amended to a 92–92 draw.

=== Awards ===
- The leading goalkicker for the home-and-away season was Bob Johnson (Oakleigh), who kicked 87 goals; Jim Miller (Dandenong) was second with 84 goals. For the completed season including finals, Miller was the leading goalkicker for the fourth consecutive season with 99 goals; Johnson was second with 91 goals.
- The J. J. Liston Trophy was won for the second time in three seasons by Laurie Hill (Preston), who polled 29 votes. Vin Crowe (Prahran) was second with 27 votes, and Maurie Gale (Coburg) finished third with 26 votes.
- Oakleigh won the seconds premiership. Oakleigh 7.20 (62) defeated Port Melbourne 8.7 (55) in the Grand Final, played as a stand-alone match on Saturday 18 September at Skinner Reserve.

== Division 2 ==
The Division 2 home-and-home season was played over eighteen rounds; the top four then contested the finals under the Page–McIntyre system; all finals were played on Sundays at Toorak Park.

=== Ladder ===
1971 VFA Division 2 Ladder
	TEAM	P	W	L	D	PF	PA	Pct	PTS
1	Caulfield	18	15	3	0	2388	1495	159.7	60
2	Sunshine (P)	18	15	3	0	2383	1578	151.0	60
3	Yarraville	18	14	4	0	2262	1735	130.3	56
4	Brunswick	18	10	8	0	1900	1730	109.8	40
5	Box Hill	18	8	10	0	2002	1845	108.5	32
6	Northcote	18	7	11	0	1760	1931	91.1	28
7	Camberwell	18	6	11	1	1479	2000	73.9	20
8	Mordialloc	18	6	12	0	1557	2106	73.9	24
9	Frankston	18	5	12	1	1872	2390	78.3	22
10	Werribee	18	3	15	0	1421	2217	64.0	12
Key: P = Played, W = Won, L = Lost, D = Drawn, PF = Points For, PA = Points Against, Pct = Percentage; (P) = Premiers, PTS = Premiership points								Source	

=== Finals ===
	Semi-finals
Sunday, 22 August	Yarraville 14.15 (99)	def. by	Brunswick 18.20 (128)	Toorak Park (crowd: 6,000)
Sunday, 29 August	Caulfield 10.12 (72)	def. by	Sunshine 13.24 (102)	Toorak Park

	Preliminary Final
Sunday, 5 September	Caulfield 18.17 (125)	def. by	Brunswick 19.13 (127)	Toorak Park (crowd: 6,500)

1971 VFA Division 2 Grand Final
Sunday, 12 September	Sunshine	def.	Brunswick	Toorak Park (crowd: 10,000)
7.3 (45); 11.13 (79); 15.17 (107); 22.26 (158)	Q1; Q2; Q3; Final	6.4 (40); 8.6 (54); 13.8 (86); 16.8 (104)	Umpires: Anderson
Darul 5, Ferguson 5, Benson 2, Crawford 2, Wagland 2, Bean, Brown, Chadwick, Goold, Nicholson, Prior	Goals	Cook 4, Ogston 3, Schimmelbusch 3, Allan 2, Dalton, Dimattina, Horsington, Nivan
Chadwick (concussion)	Injuries	Egan (leg), Horsington (leg)

=== Awards ===
- The leading goalkicker for Division 2 was Greg Barnett (Box Hill), who kicked 69 goals in the home-and-away season and did not participate in finals.
- The J. J. Field Medal was won by Rodney Evans (Camberwell), who polled 45 votes. Evans finished ahead of Graeme Cliff (Caulfield), who finished second with 39 votes, and Ian McOrist (Northcote), who finished third with 31 votes.
- Brunswick won the seconds premiership. Brunswick 15.15 (105) defeated Box Hill 14.9 (93) in the Grand Final, held as a stand-alone match on Saturday 4 September at Skinner Reserve.

== Notable events ==
- On Sunday 21 March, late in the first quarter of a pre-season practice match between Sunshine and Benalla in Benalla, Sunshine full-forward George Allen suddenly collapsed and died on the field. He had crashed heavily to the ground on his side in a marking contest a few minutes earlier, but had returned to full forward and shown no ill-effects from the contest until his collapse. The match was called off after Allen's death. Allen was 22 years old, and had been the Division 2 leading goalkicker in each of the previous two seasons.
- Frankston played its first home Sunday matches this season, becoming the last of the twenty clubs to begin doing so.
- On Sunday 4 July, Oakleigh 26.4 (160) defeated Port Melbourne 11.20 (86); it was such a wide disparity in goal-kicking accuracy that Port Melbourne lost by 74 points despite having one more scoring shot than Oakleigh.
- Prahran dropped three players from its team for its final round match against Geelong West for disciplinary reasons. Among them was Liston Trophy runner-up Vin Crowe, denying him the opportunity to score the winning votes in the final round; Crowe had led the count by four votes after Round 17, but Laurie Hill polled six votes in the last game to pass him and claim the award.

== See also ==
- List of VFA/VFL premiers
