= Jack Buckley (footballer, born 1907) =

Australian rules footballer

Personal information
- Full name: Jack Buckley
- Born: 25 June 1907
- Died: 26 April 1980 (aged 72)
- Original team: Coburg Juniors
- Height: 183 cm (6 ft 0 in)
- Weight: 85 kg (187 lb)

Playing career^{1}
Years	Club	Games (Goals)
1929	Fitzroy	5 (0)
- ^{1} Playing statistics correct to the end of 1929.

Jack Buckley (25 June 1907 – 26 April 1980) was an Australian rules footballer who played with Fitzroy in the Victorian Football League (VFL).

He was the father of Carlton footballer, Brian Buckley, and Coburg footballer, John Buckley, and the grandfather of Carlton footballers Stephen Buckley and Mark Buckley.
