= Geoff Grover =

Australian rules footballer (1943–2017)

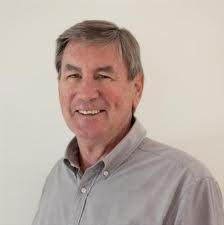

Personal information
- Full name: Geoffrey David Grover
- Born: 19 September 1943
- Died: 12 April 2017 (aged 73)
- Original team: Caulfield Grammarians (VAFA)
- Height: 189 cm (6 ft 2 in)
- Weight: 86 kg (190 lb)
- Position: full-back

Playing career^{1}
Years	Club	Games (Goals)
1963–1964	St Kilda	2 (0)
1965–1971	Port Melbourne	119

Representative team honours
Years	Team	Games (Goals)
1966	VFA	3 (0)
- ^{1} Playing statistics correct to the end of 1973.

Geoffrey David "Geoff" Grover (19 September 1943 – 12 April 2017), was an Australian rules footballer who played for two seasons with the Caulfield Grammarians Football Club in the Victorian Amateur Football Association, and was a business and marketing expert, who finished his career working in real estate on the Queensland Sunshine Coast.

He played two senior games for the St Kilda Football Club in the Victorian Football League (VFL), and two seasons with the St Kilda Reserves (including a Grand Final at the MCG in front of more than 100,000 people).

He played 119 senior games for the Port Melbourne Football Club in the Victorian Football Association (VFA), including the 1967 Grand Final against Dandenong Football Club.

He represented the VFA at the 1966 Australian National Football Carnival in Hobart, the last time that a VFA team took part in any ANFC carnival.

On leaving Port Melbourne at the end of 1971, he was captain coach of the Ferntree Gully Football Club in the Eastern Districts Football League in 1972 and 1973.

== Early life and education ==
The son of William David Grover and Roma Dolores Grover, née McIntosh, Geoffrey David Grover was born in Glen Huntly, Victoria, on 19 September 1943.

Educated at Albury Grammar School, Caulfield Grammar School, Monash University, and the University of Melbourne, Geoff has a Bachelor of Commerce (1968) from the University of Melbourne, and he also studied for a Master of Business Administration at Monash University.

In his final year at Caulfield Grammar (1960) he was a prefect; he also played cricket for the school's First XI, and football for the school's First XVIII.

== Football ==
He was known for his athleticism and mobility on the football field. During his school years, he was noted for his overhead marking ability, long-distance kicking, and willingness to run upfield to advance the ball. He was left-handed and right-footed, bouncing and handballing with his left hand while kicking with his right foot.

Geoff Grover (Port Melbourne)

22 yrs, 188 cm, 87.5 kg.
In great form in defence.
A real dasher, splendid mark, and fast mover.
His first interstate squad.
A former star at 18 with Old Caulfield Grammarians in the Amateur Association.

VFA Player Details, ANFC Carnival Programme, 1966.

=== VAFA ===
On leaving school he played nearly 40 senior matches for the Caulfield Grammarians Football Club in the VAFA in 1961 and 1962, including CGFC's Grand Final win in D Section in 1961.

=== VFL ===
He was recruited from CGFC in 1963. In his first season at St Kilda, he was one of the best on the ground for the St Kilda team which beat North Melbourne 12.13 (85) to 9.12 (16) in the Reserve Grade preliminary final. He also played in the St Kilda Reserves team (with two of his Caulfield Grammar classmates, Graeme Vorrath and John Dowling) that lost the Grand Final against Geelong, 13.12 (90) to 7.11 (53), on Saturday, 5 October 1963, in front of a crowd of 101,452 spectators at the MCG.

He made his senior league debut for St Kilda, playing at full back (in place of the injured Verdun Howell), on Saturday, 18 July 1964 (round 13), in a five-point loss to Footscray at the Western Oval, 10.10 (70) to 11.9 (75), in which his fellow Caulfield Grammarian, John Schultz, was best on ground.

He also played against Hawthorn, the following week (Saturday, 25 July 1964), when St Kilda won by 30 points, 11.15 (81) to 7.9 (51). He played no more senior football at St Kilda.

=== VFA ===
At the end of 1964, St Kilda played its last match at the Junction Oval, and moved its entire operation to the Moorabbin Oval. At the time, the demands of his employer (General Motors Holden at Fisherman's Bend) were such that Geoff was not able to travel all the way from Port Melbourne to Moorabbin to train as St Kilda demanded; and, so, at the beginning of the 1965 season, he was (amicably) cleared by St Kilda to Port Melbourne Football Club in the VFA.

He continued to play with Port Melbourne until the end of the 1971 season, playing a total of 119 senior games, including three Grand Finals: in 1965, 1966, and 1967.

He was one of the best on the ground for his team in its Grand Final loss to Waverley in 1965.

He played a strong game at full-back for the Port Melbourne 1966 Grand Final team that thrashed Waverley, 13.12 (90) to 6.11 (47).

=== 1967 VFA Grand Final ===
On Sunday, 24 September 1967, the VFA Grand Final was contested between Port Melbourne and Dandenong at the Punt Road Oval, Richmond. Playing at full-back, Geoff was one of the best on the ground for Port Melbourne in what was "indisputably one of the most infamous matches in Australian football history", when an exhausted Port Melbourne eventually lost to a bigger and stronger Dandenong team 16.13 (109) to 12.12 (84).

=== VFA representative ===
He represented the VFA in the 1966 Hobart Carnival, playing strongly, at full-back, in three of the team's games (he one of the team's best players in each of the three matches): against Tasmania's champion full-forward, Peter Hudson, on Saturday 11 June 1966, against Victoria's captain and full-forward, Ted Whitten (who played at full-forward in place of the injured Ken Fraser), on Monday, 13 June 1966, and against South Australia's champion full-forward Geoff Kingston, on Thursday 16 June 1966.

He played so well at full-back in his three games that, even though one of his opponents, Peter Hudson, was selected at full-forward for the 1966 All-Australian team of 20 players, at the end of the carnival, Geoff would have been selected if the organizers (as they had done in the 1953 team, the 1956 team, and the 1958 team) had selected a player from the VFA.

=== EDFL ===
Having played 119 senior games for Port Melbourne, he became captain/coach of the Ferntree Gully ("Eagles") Football Club in the Eastern Districts Football League for two seasons: 1972 and 1973.

He left Ferntree Gully, and retired from football, when his employer, the Ford Motor Company, offered him a substantial promotion to its West Australian operation in Perth.

=== Recognition ===
In 2003, in recognition of his consistent performance and overall excellence in an era of very tough football, in a very tough competition, he was nominated as a candidate for the position of full-back in Port Melbourne's "Team of the Century".

== After football ==
An able scholar, a dedicated team player, and developing into a strong leader on and off the sports field, Geoff held a number of senior sales and marketing positions with Ford Motor Company in Victoria and in Western Australia, culminating in that of National Sales and Marketing Manager (Commercial Vehicles) at the company's Head Office at Broadmeadows. He was also the Managing Director at Innova Design Furniture, in Brisbane; and, later, the Queensland State Manager of the software company, Concept Systems International, before devoting himself to real estate, specializing in resort development and residential property. He was a licensed real estate agent, working from Mount Coolum, in Queensland, and was the Managing Director of Ranelagh Pty Ltd., a business consultancy that provides management services and strategic marketing advice, as well as providing book-keeping and software services.

In the 1980s he was National President of the Furniture Manufacturers Association. He contributed widely to the community as Chairman of State and National Industry Association bodies, Past President of the Kenmore Junior Cricket & Australian Sporting Association, Past President of the P & C of Brisbane Boys' College, Past Body Corporate Chairman of the Coolum Fairways Resort and the Seaside Villas complex, and was a member of the Mt. Coolum Golf Club.

== See also ==
- List of Caulfield Grammar School people
- List of University of Melbourne people
- List of Monash University people
- 1966 Hobart Carnival
- VFA Interstate matches 1966
- 1967 VFA Grand Final
