= Norman Goss =

Norman or Norm Goss may refer to:

- Norm Goss Jr. (Norman John Goss, born 1951), former Australian rules footballer
- Norm Goss Sr. (Norman Leslie Goss, 1915–1983), Australian rules footballer and father of Norm Goss, Jr.
- Norman P. Goss (1906–1977), American inventor and researcher
