= Paul Goss =

Australian rules footballer

Personal information
- Full name: Paul Goss
- Born: 19 June 1954 (age 72)
- Original team: Port Melbourne
- Height: 169 cm (5 ft 7 in)
- Weight: 71 kg (157 lb)

Playing career^{1}
Years	Club	Games (Goals)
1976	Melbourne	4 (2)
- ^{1} Playing statistics correct to the end of 1976.

Paul Goss (born 19 June 1954) is a former Australian rules footballer who played with Melbourne in the Victorian Football League (VFL).

Goss, the son of Norm Sr and brother of Kevin and Norm Jr, continued his family's history at Port Melbourne when he made his debut for the VFA club in 1973. After winning their "Best and Fairest" award in 1975, Goss joined Melbourne and appeared in three of the first four matches of the 1976 VFL season.

The red-headed rover returned to Port Melbourne after one season before retiring with 128 games to his name.
