= 1965 Hawthorn Football Club season =

41st season in the Victorian Football League

Hawthorn Football Club
1965 season
- President: Dr. A.S. Ferguson
- Coach: Graham Arthur
- Captains: Graham Arthur; John Peck
- Home ground: Glenferrie Oval
- Golden Fleece Cup: Semi-final
- VFL season: 4–14 (12th)
- Finals series: Did not qualify
- Best and Fairest: David Parkin
- Leading goalkicker: John Peck (56)
- Highest home attendance: 36,000 (Round 1 vs. Carlton)
- Lowest home attendance: 9,000 (Round 4 vs. Fitzroy)
- Average home attendance: 15,856

The 1965 season was the Hawthorn Football Club's 41st season in the Victorian Football League and 64th overall. As of 2023, this was the last time Hawthorn finished last.

== Fixture ==
=== Premiership Season ===
Rd	Date and local time	Opponent	Scores (Hawthorn's scores indicated in bold)			Venue	Attendance	Record
Rd	Date and local time	Opponent	Home	Away	Result	Venue	Attendance	Record
1	Saturday, 17 April (2:20 pm)	Carlton	**8.6 (54)**	12.19 (91)	Lost by 37 points	Glenferrie Oval (H)	36,000	0–1
2	Saturday, 24 April (2:20 pm)	Essendon	20.18 (138)	**6.8 (44)**	Lost by 94 points	Windy Hill (A)	20,500	0–2
3	Saturday, 1 May (2:20 pm)	Collingwood	19.16 (130)	**10.9 (69)**	Lost by 61 points	Victoria Park (A)	25,733	0–3
4	Saturday, 8 May (2:20 pm)	Fitzroy	**14.14 (98)**	9.7 (61)	Won by 37 points	Glenferrie Oval (H)	9,000	1–3
5	Saturday, 15 May (2:20 pm)	Richmond	14.21 (105)	**8.12 (60)**	Lost by 45 points	Melbourne Cricket Ground (A)	32,104	1–4
6	Saturday, 22 May (2:20 pm)	Footscray	**12.9 (81)**	10.14 (74)	Won by 7 points	Glenferrie Oval (H)	11,800	2–4
7	Saturday, 29 May (2:20 pm)	Geelong	18.14 (122)	**6.9 (45)**	Lost by 77 points	Kardinia Park (A)	19,004	2–5
8	Saturday, 5 June (2:20 pm)	South Melbourne	13.24 (102)	**12.19 (91)**	Lost by 11 points	Lake Oval (A)	17,400	2–6
9	Saturday, 12 June (2:20 pm)	North Melbourne	**14.10 (94)**	14.13 (97)	Lost by 3 points	Glenferrie Oval (H)	11,000	2–7
10	Saturday, 26 June (2:20 pm)	St Kilda	24.12 (156)	**11.9 (75)**	Lost by 81 points	Moorabbin Oval (A)	20,010	2–8
11	Saturday, 3 July (2:20 pm)	Melbourne	**9.13 (67)**	19.11 (125)	Lost by 58 points	Glenferrie Oval (H)	14,900	2–9
12	Saturday, 17 July (2:20 pm)	Carlton	8.19 (67)	**8.4 (52)**	Lost by 15 points	Princes Park (A)	12,791	2–10
13	Saturday, 24 July (2:20 pm)	Essendon	**7.5 (47)**	10.11 (71)	Lost by 24 points	Glenferrie Oval (H)	11,400	2–11
14	Saturday, 31 July (2:20 pm)	Collingwood	**8.12 (60)**	12.22 (94)	Lost by 34 points	Glenferrie Oval (H)	18,500	2–12
15	Saturday, 7 August (2:20 pm)	Fitzroy	4.12 (36)	**8.6 (54)**	Won by 18 points	Brunswick Street Oval (A)	7,463	3–12
16	Saturday, 14 August (2:20 pm)	Richmond	**9.14 (68)**	16.14 (110)	Lost by 42 points	Glenferrie Oval (H)	15,000	3–13
17	Saturday, 21 August (2:20 pm)	Footscray	4.17 (41)	**11.6 (72)**	Won by 31 points	Western Oval (A)	10,498	4–13
18	Saturday, 28 August (2:20 pm)	Geelong	**10.9 (69)**	17.20 (122)	Lost by 53 points	Glenferrie Oval (H)	15,100	4–14

=== Golden Fleece Cup ===
Rd	Date and local time	Opponent	Scores (Hawthorn's scores indicated in bold)			Venue	Attendance
Rd	Date and local time	Opponent	Home	Away	Result	Venue	Attendance
1	Thursday, 9 September	South Melbourne	**9.25 (79)**	9.10 (64)	Won by 15 points	Lake Oval	19,725
Semi Final	Tuesday, 21 September	North Melbourne	13.10 (88)	**6.10 (46)**	Lost by 42 points	Lake Oval	13,550

== Ladder ==
(P)	Premiers
	Qualified for finals

#	Team	P	W	L	D	PF	PA	%	Pts
1	St Kilda	18	14	4	0	1573	1154	136.3	56
2	Collingwood	18	13	5	0	1473	1131	130.2	52
3	Geelong	18	13	5	0	1319	1088	121.2	52
4	Essendon (P)	18	12	6	0	1465	1102	132.9	48
5	Richmond	18	10	8	0	1561	1249	125.0	40
6	Carlton	18	10	8	0	1317	1190	110.7	40
7	Melbourne	18	10	8	0	1265	1315	96.2	40
8	South Melbourne	18	9	9	0	1386	1550	89.4	36
9	North Melbourne	18	5	13	0	1143	1415	80.8	20
10	Footscray	18	4	14	0	1010	1310	77.1	16
11	Fitzroy	18	4	14	0	1114	1580	70.5	16
12	Hawthorn	18	4	14	0	1200	1742	68.9	16

Rules for classification: 1. premiership points; 2. percentage; 3. points for
Average score: 73.3
Source: AFL Tables
