= 1971 VFA Grand Final =

1971 Australian rules football final

1971 VFA Division 1 Grand Final

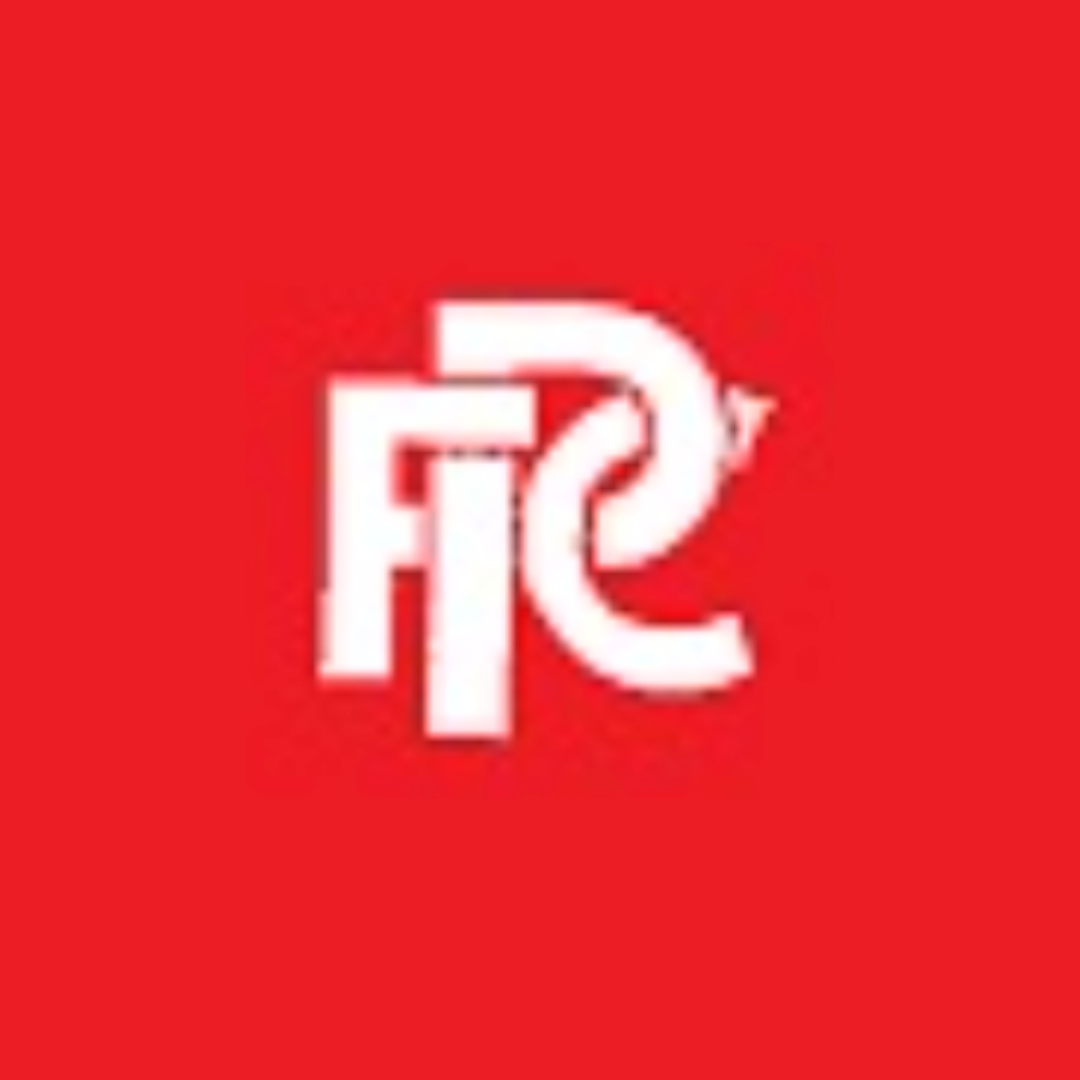
Dandenong	Preston
14.14 (98)	13.14 (92)
	1	2	3	4
DAN	7.8 (50)	10.8 (68)	12.12 (84)	14.14 (98)
PRE	3.4 (22)	8.6 (54)	9.9 (63)	13.14 (92)
- Date: 26 September 1971
- Stadium: Junction Oval
- Attendance: 14,529

The 1971 VFA Division 1 Grand Final was an Australian rules football match played between the Dandenong Football Club and the Preston Football Club. The match was held on Sunday 26 September 1971 at Junction Oval to decide the premiership for the 1971 Division 1 season in the Victorian Football Association (VFA).

The match was one of the most controversial in the history of the VFA. Dandenong won the match by six points; however, Preston challenged the result, on the grounds that a free kick paid to Dandenong full-forward Jim Miller before the opening bounce was not valid under the rules of the game. It was not until Preston's challenge was defeated on the evening of Wednesday 29 September that Dandenong was formally confirmed as premiers. It was Dandenong's second VFA Division 1 premiership.

== Lead-up ==
The Dandenong Redlegs (Note: Dandenong was formally known by the nickname "Dandies", but the colloquial nickname "Redlegs" was in much wider use.) and Preston Bullants had both been promoted from Division 2 to Division 1 in the early 1960s, and had enjoyed success in Division 1 through the latter part of the decade. Dandenong won its first premiership in 1967, and Preston won its first premiership in 1968. The two teams then faced each other in the 1969 grand final, which Preston won by twelve points to secure back-to-back flags. Both sides missed the finals in 1970, but returned to the top of the ladder in 1971.

At the end of the 1971 home and away season, Preston finished as minor premiers with a record of 13-4-1; Dandenong finished second with a record of 12–6. The teams had met in the final round of the home and away season, in a vigorous and spiteful match which included two brawls; Preston won the match by 14 points. The two teams faced off in the Second Semi-Final on 12 September, with Dandenong winning easily; the result was effectively decided by quarter time, when Dandenong led 12.2 (74) to 1.2 (8) by 66 points; the Redlegs eventually won 24.11 (155) to 11.15 (81), by 74 points, with Jim Miller kicking ten goals. Preston faced Sandringham in the Preliminary Final on 19 September, and survived a late comeback to beat the Zebras, 17.17 (119) to 14.21 (105), by 14 points.

The field umpire for the grand final was Jim McMaster. The match was played at the Junction Oval in St Kilda, a neutral venue.

== Match report ==
Prior to the opening bounce, and prior to the opening siren, umpire McMaster observed jostling between Dandenong full-forward Jim Miller and Preston full-back Barry Leslie. Without bouncing the ball, McMaster paid a free kick against Leslie for a push in the back, from which Miller scored the opening goal of the game, giving Dandenong an early six-point lead. This free kick would ultimately be the subject of Preston's challenge to the match result.

Dandenong was kicking with the aid of a breeze in the first quarter, and controlled general play to lead by 28 points at quarter time, although wasteful goalkicking saw the Redlegs score only 7.8 (50) from its fifteen scoring shots. The sides also resumed their hostilities from the final round of the season, with a brawl started after only six minutes had elapsed. With the advantage of the wind in the second quarter, Preston kicked five goals to three to narrow the margin to 14 points at half-time.

In a low-scoring third quarter, Dandenong kicked two goals to one with the wind, to lead by 21 points. Several brawls and fights took place in the third quarter, and three players – Jim Miller and Lyall Henriksen from Dandenong, and Robert Ireland from Preston – were reported for striking.

Preston had the better of attack in the final quarter; they kicked four quick goals late in the game, and at the 22-minute mark, after trailing for the entire afternoon, hit the front by one point. In the close finish, Pat Flaherty kicked a goal to regain the lead for Dandenong by five points, and then kicked another behind to extend the lead to six. There was no further score, the final siren sounded, and Dandenong won the game by six points.

Overall, Dandenong rover Rod Evans was credited as the best on ground for the Redlegs. Ruckman Bernie McCarthy was the Bullants' best player, and Preston's final quarter fightback is largely credited to McCarthy's good ruckwork. Miller was the leading goalkicker on the ground, with five; he finished with 99 goals for the 1971 season, including finals.

=== Scoreboard ===
1971 VFA Division 1 Grand Final
Sunday, 26 September	Dandenong	def.	Preston	Junction Oval (crowd: 14,529)
7.8 (50); 10.8 (68); 12.12 (84); 14.14 (98)	Q1; Q2; Q3; Final	3.4 (22); 8.6 (54); 9.9 (63); 13.14 (92)	Umpires: Jim McMaster
Miller 5; Orchard, Ellis, Flaherty 2; Hibbert, Evans, Reid	Goals	Saltmarsh 4; Telford 2; McCarthy, Ireland, Dickson, Allen, Martin, Goad, Ashmead
Lyall Henriksen, for striking Greg Goad in the third quarter Jim Miller, for striking Bert Thornley in the third quarter	Reports	Robert Ireland, for striking Lyall Henriksen in the third quarter
Preston unsuccessfully protested to have the result amended to a 92–92 draw.

== Protest ==
The evening after the game, Preston club secretary Alf Rowe informed the VFA that the club would protest the result of the game; a formal protest was lodged on the morning of Monday 27 September. The basis of Preston's protest was that the free kick paid to Miller prior to the opening bounce was invalid, because umpire McMaster had not formally started the match when he paid it. Preston contended that Miller's goal should be removed from the scorecard, the final score amended to 92–92, and the premiership decided by a grand final replay the following Sunday. Preston did not at any stage attempt to argue that Leslie had not pushed Miller in the back, only that he should not have been penalised for doing so because the game had not yet started.

The protest was heard by a meeting of the VFA Board of Management on the evening of Wednesday 29 September. The Board of Management had a total of 44 members, including two delegates from each of the 20 VFA clubs.

=== Relevant rules and customs ===
Preston's protest was based primarily on Rule 6(b) which described the commencement of play as follows:

The field umpire shall blow his whistle and bounce the ball in the circle... at the start of each quarter.

Preston's contention was that because the ball had not been bounced, the match had not started when the free kick was paid, making it invalid. Media reports on the protest also made reference to Rule 17(a), which stated:

All breaches of the laws must be penalised whether the ball is dead or in play,

although it is not immediately clear how this rule interacts with the start of the game as defined in Rule 6.

VFA umpires' advisor Andrew O'Neill testified during the Board of Management meeting that, regardless of the precise interpretation of Rule 6(b), umpires were formally advised that free kicks could be paid between the opening whistle and the opening bounce – and therefore that the game is thought to commence at the opening whistle.

Finally, it was testified that it was common practice (although not necessarily explicit in the rules) for an umpire to confirm that the timekeepers are ready by holding the ball above his head, and waiting for the timekeepers to sound the siren – after which he blows the opening whistle, followed by executing the opening bounce.

=== Evidence related to the start of the game ===
The Board of Management meeting was hindered by the fact that a technical error meant there was no video footage of the first few minutes of the match; as such, all evidence presented at the meeting was verbal.

According to McMaster's testimony, he blew the opening whistle once he was convinced that the teams were ready. However, the timekeepers did not sound the opening siren until McMaster was already in the Dandenong forward-line handing the ball to Miller; this contributed significantly to the confusion about whether or not the game had started. The confusion was caused by the fact that McMaster had not effectively held the ball above his head and waited for the timekeepers to sound the siren, as was the normal custom; Preston timekeeper Len Herman said that he did not see McMaster lift the ball at all, which Preston captain Laurie Hill agreed with, while The Sun News-Pictorial reporter Murray Hubbard reported that McMaster had "half-raised the ball" before blowing his whistle.

McMaster testified that he saw Leslie push Miller as he was still blowing his opening whistle – which, by O'Neill's advice, allowed him to pay the free kick, regardless of whether or not the siren had sounded. He then immediately blew his whistle a second time to signify the free kick, and ran to the Dandenong forward-line to give the ball to Miller. Witnesses had different accounts on whether or not they heard McMaster blow the opening whistle, or were able to discern it from the free kick whistle. Dandenong timekeeper, Graham Way, testified that although he did not hear the opening whistle, he did see McMaster appear to blow it.

=== David Sheehan's after-the-siren opportunity ===
Shortly before the final siren, Dandenong's David Sheehan had taken a mark in Dandenong's forward-line, roughly 30 yards out, directly in front; even considering the wind, Sheehan could easily have scored from this distance. When the siren sounded with Dandenong in front, Sheehan threw the ball away, went to celebrate with his team-mates, and did not take the after-the-siren kick for goal to which he was entitled. Had Sheehan taken his kick, any score would have pushed the final margin beyond six points, and it is almost certain that Preston would not have protested the result.

=== Reaction to the protest ===
Dandenong reacted with anger towards Preston's protest. Dandenong club secretary, Lionel Farrow, made it clear that his club believed Preston was behaving as a sore loser – particularly considering the circumstances surrounding David Sheehan's after-the-siren opportunity. Many Dandenong players publicly stated that they would boycott any replay, and the team did not continue its training during the week, so it is questionable whether or not a replay would ever have occurred. Many players were unhappy that the glory and celebration of their premiership were ruined by the uncertainty of the protest.

Preston coach Kevin Wright made it clear that the decision to protest was made at the club administrative level, and that he and his players were prepared to accept the six-point defeat without challenge. Nevertheless, the team continued its training through the week in case the protest was successful.

In the uncertainty that followed the protest, the VFA postponed its tribunal session, such that the three players who were reported in the third quarter would have been permitted to play if a replay had eventuated, with their cases to be heard the following week. The VFA also secured the availability of the Junction Oval from the St Kilda Cricket Club for a replay on the Sunday, which would have delayed the opening of St Kilda's district cricket season.

=== Decision ===
Following the Board of Management meeting, which lasted 2½ hours, Preston's protest was rejected, and Dandenong was formally confirmed as the 1971 Division 1 Premiers. The board ruled in Dandenong's favour by an overwhelming majority, listed in different sources as either 39–5 or 40–4.

It is unclear whether the decision was based solely on Preston's arguments concerning the application of Rule 6(b), or whether other factors – such as the breakdown in umpire-timekeeper communication, the circumstances of Sheehan's after-the-siren opportunity, or Dandenong's threats that it could boycott the replay – were taken into account by Board of Management delegates.

== Historical context ==
This was not the first incident of this type at the top level of the game. In the West Australian Football League (WAFL) grand final of 1907 between East Fremantle and Perth, legendary umpire Henry "Ivo" Crapp awarded a free kick to East Fremantle's Chas Doig at half time, from which Doig scored a goal; East Fremantle initially won the match by five points.

However, Perth lodged a protest with the league, contending that Crapp blew his whistle for Doig's free kick after the half-time bell had sounded, and therefore play was dead and the free kick was invalid – similar to the argument put forward by Preston concerning the commencement of its game. In that case, Perth's protest was upheld, the score was amended, and Perth was awarded the premiership by one point.

Under the 2011 version of the Laws of the Game, it is made explicit in Law 15.1.3(a) that an umpire may award a free kick for any infringement which takes place on the playing surface prior to the commencement of a quarter. Under this modern version of the Laws, Preston would have had no case for a challenge.

Miller's goal and Preston's protest have left a legacy, with the incident celebrated as one of Australian rules football's 150 greatest moments, released coinciding with the 150th anniversary of the sport in 2008.
