= Hugh Mitchell (Australian footballer) =

Australian rules footballer and coach (1934–2024)

Personal information
- Born: 22 November 1934
- Died: 27 October 2024 (aged 89)
- Original team: Moonee Imperials
- Height: 183 cm (6 ft 0 in)
- Weight: 80 kg (176 lb)

Playing career^{1}
| Years | Club | Games (Goals) |
| 1953–1967 | Essendon | 224 (306) |

Coaching career
| Years | Club | Games (W–L–D) |
| 1970–1973 | Dandenong | 79 (48–29–2) |
- ^{1} Playing statistics correct to the end of 1967.

Career highlights
- Essendon best and fairest 1959; Equal third, 1959 Brownlow Medal (14 votes); Victorian state team: 1959, 1960, 1961, 1962 (13 goals); Essendon vice-captain: 1963; Essendon acting captain: 1961 (once), 1965 (once); Essendon life member 1962; Essendon premiership player 1962, 1965; Essendon leading goalkicker 1955, 1961, 1964; Dandenong Team of the Century (ruck-rover)

Hugh Mitchell (22 November 1934 – 27 October 2024) was an Australian rules footballer and coach who played for Essendon in the Victorian Football League (VFL) and Dandenong in the Victorian Football Association (VFA) during the 1950s and 1960s.

== Early career at Essendon ==
Recruited from the local junior team the Moonee Imperials, Mitchell was so impressive with the Essendon thirds (under-19s) in his first season that he was promoted to the firsts; and, apart from times when injured (he was prone to leg injuries), he played as a firsts regular. He played 77 consecutive games for the firsts from 1954 to 1958.

In his early career he played on the forward line. He played at full-forward on the side that lost 7.11 (53) to Geelong's 9.7 (61) in the 1955 first semi-final. As his career progressed he developed into Essendon's first specialist ruck-rover who for many years rucked in tandem with Geoff Leek, alternating with Mal Pascoe.

He played his first senior match for Essendon on Saturday 15 August 1953, in round 16 of the 1953 home-and-away season, when Essendon beat Melbourne at the Melbourne Cricket Ground to 12.10 (82) to 8.9 (57), with Mitchell scoring the first of his 301 career goals for Essendon.

He kicked five goals in a match on four occasions, six goals in a match on two occasions, and nine goals, in an Essendon team score of 13.14 (92) against South Melbourne 7.12 (54), at Windy Hill on Saturday 4 June 1955.

== After Essendon ==
Mitchell left Essendon after the second round of the 1967 season, when both he and Jack Clarke retired following their protests at their unceremonious relegation to the seconds, following the firsts' embarrassing losses to Richmond and St Kilda respectively in the first two rounds.

A disappointed Mitchell crossed to VFA team Dandenong. As a ruck-rover, he played in Dandenong's controversial 1967 Grand Final victory over Port Melbourne at the Punt Road Oval. He played another season for Dandenong in 1968.

He coached Eltham Football Club to a premiership in 1969. Then he returned to Dandenong as non-playing coach, coaching them to another premiership in 1971. He left Dandenong at the end of 1973, and was appointed a special promotional officer at the Essendon Football Club; his special duties included assisting in the coaching of promising young players in the Essendon District Football League in 1974 and 1975. He coached the Carlton reserves from 1976 to 1977.

Later, he worked as a television and radio commentator.

Mitchell died on 27 October 2024, at the age of 89.
