= Norm Goss Sr. =

Australian rules footballer and administrator

Norman Leslie Goss

Personal information
- Full name: Norman Leslie Goss
- Born: 6 June 1915
- Died: 17 March 1983 (aged 67)
- Original team: Port Melbourne
- Height: 177 cm (5 ft 10 in)
- Weight: 82 kg (181 lb)

Playing career^{1}
Years	Club	Games (Goals)
1942–1943	Hawthorn	8 (0)
- ^{1} Playing statistics correct to the end of 1943.

Norman Leslie Goss (6 June 1915 – 17 March 1983) was an Australian rules football administrator who was heavily involved with the Port Melbourne Football Club and Victorian Football Association throughout his career. He was also a player at Port Melbourne and Hawthorn.

== Playing career ==
Goss played his earlier football for Port Melbourne in the Victorian Football Association, having made his debut in 1937. He finished his VFA career with 85 games, but it would have been more had the league not gone into recess during the second world war. As a result, he spent two seasons in the VFL with Hawthorn, playing five games in 1942 and a further three in 1943. Goss won premierships with Port Melbourne in 1940 and 1941.

== Administration ==
After leaving Hawthorn, Goss continued playing at Port Melbourne until taking up the role of club secretary in 1947, in which he was highly influential. He remained in this role until 1976 and was then the VFA's vice-president through to 1981. From 1981 to 1983 he served as Port Melbourne's president. In the infamous 1967 VFA Grand Final, during his time as secretary, Goss is known to have intervened to stop captain-coach Brian Buckley sending his team off the field to protest against the umpiring.

Following Goss' death in March 1983, the VFA established the Norm Goss Memorial Medal, which has been awarded annually since 1983, to the best player afield in the VFA/VFL grand final.

In the 1970s, the main grandstand of North Port Oval, Port Melbourne's home ground, was named the "Norman L Goss Stand" in his honour.

== Family ==
One of his sons, also named Norm, would likewise start his career at Port Melbourne and play league football for Hawthorn, in addition to South Melbourne. Two more sons, Kevin and Paul, played for South Melbourne and Melbourne respectively.
