= John Caulfield (Australian footballer) =

Australian rules footballer

Personal information
- Full name: John J. Caulfield
- Born: 25 January 1944
- Died: 20 October 2006 (aged 62)
- Original team: Eltham
- Height: 183 cm (6 ft 0 in)
- Weight: 80 kg (176 lb)

Playing career^{1}
Years	Club	Games (Goals)
1963	Richmond	9 (0)
- ^{1} Playing statistics correct to the end of 1963.

John J. Caulfield (25 January 1944 – 20 October 2006) was an Australian rules footballer who played with Richmond in the Victorian Football League (VFL) and Port Melbourne in the Victorian Football Association.

A centre half back, Caulfield played nine senior VFL games late in the 1963 season. He joined Port Melbourne in 1965 and would be the VFA club's captain until 1971. He made 118 appearances in total and won Port Melbourne's 'Best and Fairest' in his first season. At the 1966 Hobart Carnival, Caulfield represented the VFA.

== See also ==
- 1967 VFA Grand Final
