= Melai =

Melai is a given name and a surname. Notable people with the name include:

- Eddie Melai (1941–2004), Australian rules footballer
- Melai Cantiveros (born 1988), Filipina actress, comedian and host
