= Peter Bedford (sportsman) =

Australian rules footballer and cricketer (born 1947)

Personal information
- Full name: Peter Lawrence Anthony Bedford
- Born: 11 April 1947 (age 79)
- Original team: Port Melbourne (VFA)
- Height: 180 cm (5 ft 11 in)
- Weight: 75 kg (165 lb)

Playing career^{1}
Years	Club	Games (Goals)
1965–1967, 1978–1979	Port Melbourne	55 (88)
1968–1976	South Melbourne	178 (325)
1977–1978	Carlton	8 (4)
Total		241 (417)
- ^{1} Playing statistics correct to the end of 1978.

Career highlights
- Brownlow Medal: 1970; South Melbourne Best and Fairest: 1969, 1970, 1971, 1973, 1975; South Melbourne leading Goalkicker: 1971, 1972, 1973; South Melbourne Captain: 1973–76; South Melbourne / Sydney Swans Team of the Century; Victorian representative: 13 games & 11 goals

Peter Lawrence Anthony Bedford (born 11 April 1947) is a former Australian rules footballer and first-class cricketer. As a footballer, he is best known for his time at South Melbourne, where he won Victorian Football League's (VFL's) Brownlow Medal in 1970 as the fairest and the best in the competition.

Bedford grew up in the Melbourne suburb of Port Melbourne. He played for his school Parade College as a junior. He began his senior career in the Victorian Football Association, where he played at Port Melbourne Football Club. He was part of the Port Melbourne team which lost the controversial 1967 VFA Grand Final against Dandenong. He played 52 senior games with Port Melbourne during this phase of his career.

At the end of the 1967 football season, Bedford was approached by South Australian National Football League (SANFL) club Port Adelaide with an offer to move to South Australia to play for Port Adelaide as well as for the South Australian cricket team. South Australian cricket selector Sir Donald Bradman considered Bedford a leading candidate for the Australia national cricket team and urged Bedford to accept the offer from Port Adelaide. However, he opted instead to stay in Melbourne and moved to VFL club South Melbourne.

He played for South Melbourne between 1968 and 1976, playing 178 games and kicking 325 goals. He was the Swans' Best & Fairest on five occasions, leading goalkicker three times and in 1970 he won a Brownlow Medal as the league's best and fairest player. He played for the Swans as a rover but was also thrown forward to kick a goal when they needed it. He was South Melbourne's captain from 1973 until his departure in 1976, when he transferred to Carlton. He played at Carlton until mid-1978, then transferred back to Port Melbourne.

Bedford was also a talented batsman and leg-spin bowler for Victoria, playing 39 matches for the State between 1966–67 and 1972–73. He made 1602 runs at 28.10 and took 45 wickets at 33.40. His top score and only century was 134 not out against Western Australia in Melbourne in 1969–70, and his best bowling figures came later in the same season against South Australia in Adelaide when he took 5 for 40 in the second innings to help Victoria win and clinch victory in the Sheffield Shield. He played district cricket for Melbourne (ten seasons) and Carlton (one season).

Bedford was selected in the Port Melbourne Team of the Century. He was inducted to the Australian Football Hall of Fame in 1999 and was named in the Swans team of the century which was announced on 8 August 2003. Bedford's father, William, was also selected in the Port Melbourne Team of the Century, and his nephew Stephen Allender won a J. J. Liston Trophy with Port Melbourne.

== See also ==
- List of Victoria first-class cricketers
