= Stephen Allender =

Australian rules footballer

Personal information
- Full name: Stephen James Allender
- Born: 24 July 1960 (age 66); Melbourne, Victoria
- Original team: St Lukes / Lalor / Port Melbourne
- Height: 194 cm (6 ft 4 in)
- Weight: 83 kg (183 lb)
- Position: Forward/Ruckman

Playing career^{1}
Years	Club	Games (Goals)
1981–83	South Melbourne/Sydney	28 (28)
1984	Hawthorn	2 (1)
Total		30 (29)
- ^{1} Playing statistics correct to the end of 1984.

Stephen James Allender (born 24 July 1960) is a former Australian rules footballer who played for the Sydney Swans and Hawthorn in the Victorian Football League (VFL) during the 1980s.

Allender attracted the attention of VFL recruiters with his strong performance for Port Melbourne in 1980, when he won the J. J. Liston Trophy and played in a premiership team. He was signed by South Melbourne at the start of 1981, but there was a dispute: although he lived in South Melbourne's zone, he was residentially tied to Carlton and would remain as such until November 1983, because he had lived in Lalor until February 1979. Carlton ended up granting him a clearance to South Melbourne, but South Melbourne was fined $20,000 by the VFL for poaching.

A ruckman or key forward, Allender spent a season at South Melbourne before making the move with the club to Sydney. He joined Hawthorn in 1984 but couldn't establish a place in their strong side, suffering a fractured vertebra. He returned to Port Melbourne, and played there until the end of 1988.

Allender is the nephew of Port Melbourne and South Melbourne legend Peter Bedford.
