= Peter V. Smith =

Australian rules footballer (1947–2026)

Peter Smith

Personal information
- Full name: Peter Victor Smith
- Born: 22 September 1947; Brunswick, Victoria, Australia
- Died: 1 April 2026 (aged 78)
- Original team: Melbourne Grammar
- Height: 183 cm (6 ft 0 in)
- Weight: 87 kg (192 lb)
- Position: Forward

Playing career
| Years | Club | Games (Goals) |
| 1966–1967 | Melbourne | 23 (23) |
| 1968–1970 | Carlton | 15 (10) |
| Total | | 38 (33) |

Peter Victor Smith (22 September 1947 – 1 April 2026) was an Australian rules footballer who played with Melbourne and Carlton in the Victorian Football League (VFL).

Smith was recruited from Melbourne Grammar and came to the Melbourne Football Club with the pressure of being the son of club great Norm Smith. A forward, he played eight games in the 1966 VFL season and 15 in 1967. He left the club after two seasons to join Carlton, coached by his friend Ron Barassi. He spent most of his time at Carlton as captain of the reserves team and managed just 15 senior games before being granted a clearance to Port Melbourne.

After spending three years at Port Melbourne, during which time his father died, Smith crossed to Coburg in a straight swap for Mick Erwin. He topped the Victorian Football Association Division Two goal-kicking in 1974 with 121 goals and his bag of 13 goals against Mordialloc late in the year saw him join Bob Pratt, Lance Collins and Jack Titus as the only Coburg players to boot a century in a season. Smith was also the full-forward in the 1974 Coburg premiership side and topped the club's goal-kicking once more in 1975.
