= Alan Lynch (footballer) =

Australian rules footballer and runner (1954–2024)

Personal information
- Nickname: Dizzy
- Born: 22 January 1954
- Died: 29 October 2024 (aged 70)
- Original team: Geelong West (VFA)
- Height: 175 cm (5 ft 9 in)
- Weight: 68 kg (150 lb)

Playing career^{1}
Years	Club	Games (Goals)
1976	Footscray	5 (1)
1976	Richmond	2 (1)
Total		7 (2)
- ^{1} Playing statistics correct to the end of 1976.

Alan Lynch (22 January 1954 – 29 October 2024) was an Australian rules footballer and middle-distance runner who played with Geelong West in the Victorian Football Association (VFA) and both Footscray and Richmond in the same Victorian Football League (VFL) season.

A member of Geelong West's 1975 premiership winning side, Lynch followed coach Bill Goggin to Footscray when Goggin was appointed coach in 1976. However, midway through the season, after playing five games for Footscray, four of which were as a reserve, he transferred to Richmond. He only played a further two games for Richmond in 1976, the last VFL games of his career. He then went on to play for Beaufort and Geelong Football Clubs, winning Geelong's reserves team best and fairest award in 1980. Geelong West appointed him coach in 1986 and he led the club until June, when he resigned for business reasons.

Commonly known as Dizzy, he competed for many years at the Stawell Gift, mainly in the one- and two-mile events. He won six races, three consecutive two-miles between 1980 and 1982 as well as the one-mile in 1980, 1981 and 1987. He has been inducted into the Stawell Hall of Fame as a legend.

Lynch died from complications of Parkinson's disease on 29 October 2024, at the age of 70.
