= Alan Osborne =

Australian rules footballer (born 1940)

Personal information
- Full name: Alan Leslie Osborne
- Born: 7 December 1940 (age 85)
- Original team: Dandenong
- Height: 188 cm (6 ft 2 in)
- Weight: 87 kg (192 lb)

Playing career^{1}
| Years | Club | Games (Goals) |
| 1962–63 | St Kilda | 11 (2) |
- ^{1} Playing statistics correct to the end of 1963.

Alan Leslie Osborne (born 7 December 1940) is a former Australian rules footballer who played for St Kilda in the Victorian Football League (VFL) during the early 1960s.

Osborne could play in a variety of positions, from forward, ruckman to back pocket. He spent just two seasons at St Kilda and made nine of his eleven appearances in the 1962 VFL season. A VFA representative in the 1966 Hobart Carnival, Osborne previously played for the league in 1961, 1964 and 1965. He was a premiership player at Dandenong in 1967 where he was charged, but exonerated, of kicking, in the Grand Final.

== See also ==
- 1967 VFA Grand Final
