= 1901 VFA season =

25th season of the Victorian Football Association

1901 VFA premiership season
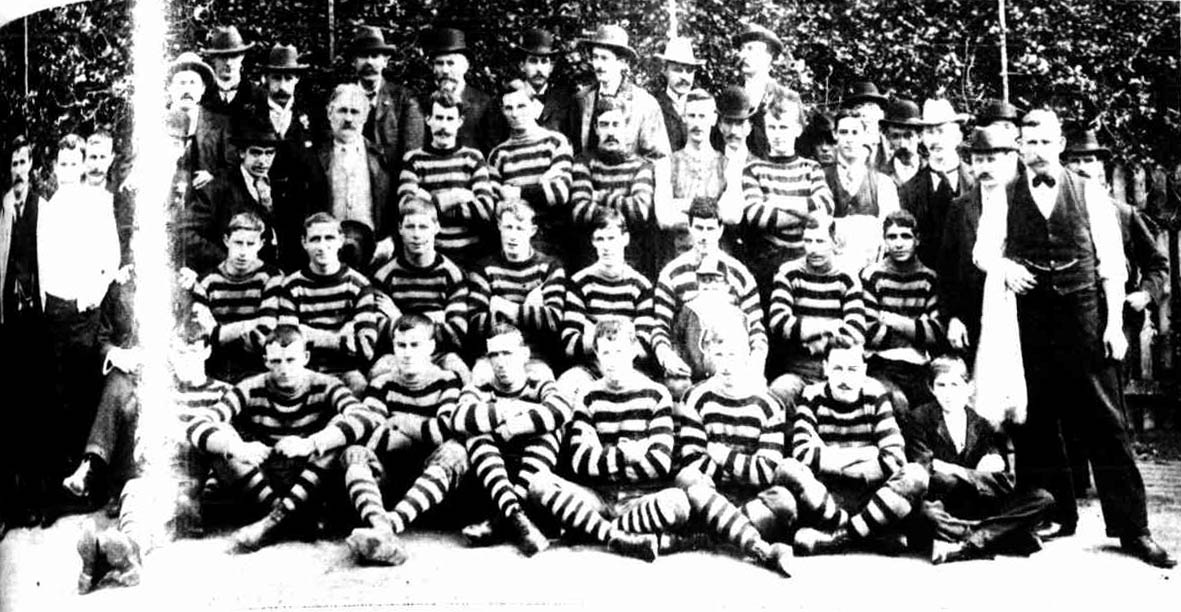
- Port Melbourne, premiers
- Teams: 9
- Premiers: Port Melbourne; 2nd premiership

The 1901 VFA season was the 25th season of the Victorian Football Association, an Australian rules football competition played in the state of Victoria. The premiership was won by the Port Melbourne Football Club for the second time in the club's history.

== Ladder ==
The premiership was decided on the basis of the best record across sixteen rostered matches, with each club playing the others twice; in the event of a tie for first place, a playoff match would have been held to determine the premiership.

Richmond led the ladder for most of the season, but a couple of losses in the latter part of the season meant that Richmond and Port Melbourne were level with records of 12–3 entering the final week of matches. On the final Saturday, Port Melbourne 7.12 (54) defeated Prahran 3.5 (23), and Richmond 2.2 (14) was defeated by North Melbourne 4.8 (32), resulting in Port Melbourne winning the premiership without the need for a playoff.

1901 VFA ladder
| Pos | Team | Pld | W | L | D | PF | PA | Pts |
|---|---|---|---|---|---|---|---|---|
| 1 | Port Melbourne (P) | 16 | 13 | 3 | 0 | 676 | 480 | 52 |
| 2 | Richmond | 16 | 12 | 4 | 0 | 681 | 428 | 48 |
| 3 | North Melbourne | 16 | 11 | 4 | 1 | 685 | 527 | 46 |
| 4 | Williamstown | 16 | 7 | 8 | 1 | 621 | 595 | 30 |
| 5 | Prahran | 16 | 7 | 9 | 0 | 665 | 659 | 28 |
| 6 | Footscray | 16 | 7 | 9 | 0 | 609 | 620 | 28 |
| 7 | Essendon Town | 16 | 7 | 9 | 0 | 479 | 606 | 28 |
| 8 | Brunswick | 16 | 6 | 10 | 0 | 619 | 706 | 24 |
| 9 | West Melbourne | 16 | 1 | 15 | 0 | 369 | 774 | 4 |

Rules for classification: 1) points; 2) percentage; 3) number of points for.
(P) Premiers

== Notable events ==
- Mr James Hall, president of the Williamstown Football Club, was elected VFA president in April 1901; he served in the role until 1903. Hall replaced previous president Cr Theodore Fink, MLA.

== See also ==
- Victorian Football Association/Victorian Football League History (1877-2008)
- List of VFA/VFL Premiers (1877-2007)
