= Kevin Goss =

Australian rules footballer

Personal information
- Full name: Kevin Goss
- Born: 27 January 1959 (age 67)
- Original team: Port Melbourne
- Height: 183 cm (6 ft 0 in)
- Weight: 76 kg (168 lb)

Playing career^{1}
Years	Club	Games (Goals)
1980–1981	South Melbourne	24 (6)
- ^{1} Playing statistics correct to the end of 1981.

Kevin Goss (born 27 January 1959) is a former Australian rules footballer who played with South Melbourne in the Victorian Football League (VFL) during the early 1980s.

The youngest of the three Goss brothers, he joined South Melbourne in 1980, one of the clubs his father Norm had played for.

A utility, Goss was a regular member of the South Melbourne side in his first season, averaging 15 disposals a game. He missed two matches in the first half of the season when he was suspended for striking North Melbourne's Maurice Boyse.

Goss later joined Hawthorn but could never break into the seniors after injuring his knee in a reserves fixture.
