= John Peck (footballer) =

Australian rules footballer (1937–1993)

Personal information
- Full name: John Leslie Peck
- Born: 7 August 1937
- Died: 2 February 1993 (aged 55)
- Original team: Canterbury Colts
- Debut: Round 1, 1954, Hawthorn vs. Essendon, at Glenferrie Oval
- Height: 188 cm (6 ft 2 in)
- Weight: 91 kg (201 lb)

Playing career^{1}
| Years | Club | Games (Goals) |
| 1954–1966 | Hawthorn | 213 (475) |
| 1967-1968 | Port Melbourne | 16 (47) |
| Total | | 229 (527) |
- ^{1} Playing statistics correct to the end of 1966.

Career highlights
- VFL premiership player: 1961; 3× Coleman Medal: 1963–1965; 8× Hawthorn leading goalkicker: 1956, 1958, 1961–1966; Hawthorn Hall of Fame

John Leslie Peck (7 August 1937 – 2 February 1993) was an Australian rules footballer, who played in the Victorian Football League (VFL).

== Football ==
=== Hawthorn ===
John Peck, the brother of Graham Peck, played for Hawthorn from 1954 to 1966.

He was the first Hawthorn player to win the leading VFL goalkicking award. Peck won the award in three successive years in 1963–65. He Kicked 78 goals in 1963, 66 goals in 1964 and 58 goals in 1965. In 1960 Peck kicked the winning goal in a match against Collingwood at Victoria Park, It was Hawthorn's first win after 35 years at that venue. Peck was the last player to win the Coleman Medal from the wooden spoon winning side until Brendan Fevola from Carlton won it in 2006.

He played in the 1961 and 1963 Grand Finals.

==== Brian Sawley ====
In the third quarter of the interstate match between Victoria and South Australia in Adelaide on 7 July 1963, playing in the ruck, Peck knocked Norwood's Brian Sawley unconscious.

A South Australian Tribunal found Peck guilty of striking, but left the penalty to be determined by the VFL — displaying controversial leniency, the VFL only suspended Peck for two weeks.

=== Port Melbourne ===
He played for Port Melbourne in the Victorian Football Association in 1967 and 1968. Most notably during his time at Port Melbourne, Peck was reported for abusing and disputing the decisions of field umpire David Jackson in the second quarter of the controversial 1967 VFA Grand Final; the incident prompted captain-coach Brian Buckley to lead the Port Melbourne team off the ground (a forfeiture was averted when club officials instructed the players to return to the field), and Peck was suspended for six matches for the incident.

== Honours and achievements ==
Hawthorn

- VFL premiership player: 1961
- 2× Minor premiership: 1961, 1963

Individual

- 3× Coleman Medal: 1963, 1964, 1965
- 8× Hawthorn leading goalkicker: 1956, 1958, 1961, 1962, 1963, 1964, 1965, 1966
- Hawthorn Hall of Fame

== Death ==
Peck died suddenly on 2 February 1993 from a heart attack at the age of 55. His death was received with great sadness within the footy community, and he was buried at the Euroa Public Cemetery.

== See also ==
- 1967 VFA Grand Final
