= Warwick Yates =

Australian rules footballer

Personal information
- Born: 24 April 1951 (age 75)
- Original team: Lorne
- Height: 193 cm (6 ft 4 in)
- Weight: 90 kg (198 lb)
- Position: Ruckman

Playing career^{1}
Years	Club	Games (Goals)
1971–1973	Geelong	21 (0)

Coaching career
Years	Club	Games (W–L–D)
1980–1981	Geelong West (VFA)	22 (13–9–0)
- ^{1} Playing statistics correct to the end of 1973.

Warwick Yates (born 24 April 1951) is a former Australian rules footballer who played with Geelong in the Victorian Football League (VFL).

== Career ==
Yates, a ruckman from Lorne, played senior football at Geelong for three seasons. He played 21 league games, 11 of which came in the 1971 VFL season.

In 1974 he began playing for Geelong West in the Victorian Football Association (VFA) and would go on and play over 200 games for the club.

He was a member of Geelong West's 1975 premiership team and captained the club in the 1977 season.

Yates won his only club best and fairest in 1979. Geelong West made the grand final that year, which Yates missed after getting injured before the preliminary final. It was reported that he broke "a leg while chopping firewood".

Appointed captain-coach in 1980, Yates led the club to the Division 1 preliminary finals and had a strong individual season with an equal sixth placing in the J. J. Liston Trophy. He remained captain-coach for the 1981 VFA season, but resigned early in the campaign.

After Geelong West merged with St Peters, Yates coached the club for its inaugural season in 1989.
