= Brian Buckley (footballer, born 1935) =

Australian rules footballer and coach

Personal information
- Full name: Brian Alan Buckley
- Born: 3 August 1935
- Died: 2 August 2014 (aged 78)
- Original team: Coburg under-17s
- Height: 185 cm (6 ft 1 in)
- Weight: 83 kg (183 lb)
- Positions: Ruckman, back pocket

Playing career^{1}
Years	Club	Games (Goals)
1956–65	Carlton	116 (6)
- ^{1} Playing statistics correct to the end of 1965.

Brian Alan Buckley (3 August 1935 – 2 August 2014) was an Australian rules footballer who played for Carlton in the Victorian Football League (VFL).

== Family ==
He was the son of Fitzroy footballer Jack Buckley. His brother, John Buckley, played with Coburg in the VFA. He married Beverley Love. They had three children: a daughter, Sharyn, and two sons, Mark and Stephen, each of whom later played at Carlton.

== Football ==
=== Carlton (VFL) ===
Recruited from Coburg as a 16-year-old, Buckley began his career in the Carlton under-19s in 1951.

He made his debut with the First XVII on 4 August 1956 – in place of the selected back pocket, Vin English – in the round 16 match against Collingwood, which Carlton won 12.12 (84) to 9.17 (71).

Although he came to Carlton as a ruckman, he spent much of his time either in the back pocket or at full back. He played in their 1962 Preliminary Final team against Hawthorn, but missed the 1962 Grand Final match the following week through injury.

=== Port Melbourne (VFA) ===
He was appointed captain-coach of Victorian Football Association (VFA) club Port Melbourne, replacing ex-Melbourne footballer, Laurie Mithen, in 1966. Port Melbourne won the 1966 VFA Premiership.

Port Melbourne made the 1967 Grand Final, but could not overcome Dandenong, coached by ex-St Kilda footballer Alan Morrow. The match, regarded as one of the controversial and violent grand finals in history, almost ended in the second quarter when Buckley threatened to lead his team-mates off the field in protest against the umpiring.

He was also the captain-coach of Port Melbourne in the 1968 season; Port Melbourne finished fifth. In all he played 49 games for Port Melbourne, kicked 8 goals, and finished third in the club's best an fairest in 1967.

=== Carlton (VFL) ===
In 1978 and 1979 he assisted Bryan Quirk in coaching the Carlton under-19 team.

== Death ==
Buckley died on 2 August 2014 after a long period of ill health.

== See also ==
- 1967 VFA Grand Final
