= Eddie Melai =

Australian rules footballer

Personal information
- Full name: Eduard Herbert Melai
- Born: 28 February 1941; Netherlands
- Died: 28 April 2004 (aged 63)
- Original team: East Geelong
- Position: Ruckman

Playing career^{1}
Years	Club	Games (Goals)
1964	South Melbourne	7 (2)
1965–1976	Dandenong	202
- ^{1} Playing statistics correct to the end of 1976.

Career highlights
- Dandenong premiership player - 1967 & 1971

Eduard Herbert Melai (28 February 1941 – 28 April 2004) was an Australian rules footballer most notable for his career with the Dandenong Football Club in the Victorian Football Association during the 1960s and 1970s.

Melai played fifty games with Geelong reserves in the Victorian Football League during the early 1960s, and was part of Geelong's 1963 reserves premiership team, but he did not play a senior game for the club. He was cleared to South Melbourne, and played seven senior matches there during the 1964 season.

In 1965, Melai crossed to Dandenong in the Victorian Football Association without a clearance. It was a historic transfer, as he was the first player to make the switch from the VFL to the VFA without a clearance after the VFA had terminated its transfer agreement with the VFL in April that year – a consequence of the bitter deterioration in relations between the two competitions following North Melbourne's relocation to Coburg.

Melai became the mainstay ruckman of the Dandenong team over the next decade, a successful time which saw Melai win premierships in 1967 – notably knocking umpire David Jackson unconscious in an accidental collision during the controversial Grand Final – and 1971, and he played off in a further three Grand Finals in 1969, 1972 and 1975. Melai retired from the VFA in June 1976, after having played 202 games for the Redlegs.

After retiring from playing with the club, he stayed on with Dandenong as a runner, and was suspended for six weeks after the 1976 Grand Final for using abusive language during the brawls for which that game became infamous. Melai continued to play football at suburban level until 1979. In the early 1990s, he served as a runner and team manager for the St Kilda Football Club.

Melai died at age 63 after suffering a stroke in April 2004. Later that year he was named as the ruckman of Dandenong's Team of the Century.
