= Stephen Buckley =

Australian rules footballer

Personal information
- Full name: Stephen Buckley
- Born: 23 April 1959 (age 67)
- Original team: St Mark's
- Height: 183 cm (6 ft 0 in)
- Weight: 79.5 kg (175 lb)
- Position: Midfielder

Playing career^{1}
Years	Club	Games (Goals)
1980–1981	Carlton	6 (3)
1983	North Melbourne	2 (0)
Total		8 (5)
- ^{1} Playing statistics correct to the end of 1983.

Stephen Buckley (born 23 April 1959) is a former Australian rules footballer who played with Carlton and North Melbourne in the Victorian Football League (VFL). His father, Brian Buckley, and brother, Mark Buckley, also played in the VFL.
