= Henry Ritterman =

Australian rules footballer

Personal information
- Full name: Henry Ritterman
- Born: 20 September 1951 (age 75); Melbourne, Victoria
- Original team: Melbourne High School Old Boys
- Height: 173 cm (5 ft 8 in)
- Weight: 74 kg (163 lb)
- Positions: On-baller, half-forward

Playing career^{1}
Years	Club	Games (Goals)
1971–1973	Melbourne	23 (10)
- ^{1} Playing statistics correct to the end of 1973.

Henry Ritterman (born 20 September 1951) is a former Australian rules footballer who played for Melbourne in the Victorian Football League during the 1970s.

Ritterman played most of his football on the ball but was also used at half-forward.

After being delisted by Melbourne, Ritterman played for Oakleigh in the Victorian Football Association and AJAX in the Victorian Amateur Football Association. In 2007, he was named in AJAX's team of the century.

Both Henry and his identical twin brother Michael represented Australia in athletics at the 1973 Maccabiah Games. The brothers were inducted into the Maccabi Victoria Hall of Fame in 2000.
