= Vin English =

Australian rules footballer

Personal information
- Full name: Vin English
- Born: 3 April 1929
- Died: 3 February 1999 (aged 69)
- Original team: Sandhurst
- Height: 185 cm (6 ft 1 in)
- Weight: 89 kg (196 lb)
- Position: Halfback

Playing career^{1}
Years	Club	Games (Goals)
1950–56	Carlton	115 (9)
- ^{1} Playing statistics correct to the end of 1956.

Vin English (3 April 1929 – 3 February 1999) was an Australian rules footballer who played with Carlton in the Victorian Football League (VFL).
