= Graeme Taggart =

Australian rules footballer

Personal information
- Full name: Graeme Taggart
- Born: 16 February 1941 (age 85)
- Height: 163 cm (5 ft 4 in)
- Weight: 62 kg (137 lb)

Playing career^{1}
| Years | Club | Games (Goals) |
| 1960 | North Melbourne | 1 (0) |
- ^{1} Playing statistics correct to the end of 1960.

Graeme Taggart (born 16 February 1941) is a former Australian rules footballer who played with North Melbourne in the Victorian Football League (VFL).
