= Gary Brice =

Australian rules footballer and coach

Personal information
- Born: 7 October 1948 (age 78)
- Original team: Port Melbourne (VFA)
- Height: 180 cm (5 ft 11 in)
- Weight: 78 kg (172 lb)

Playing career^{1}
Years	Club	Games (Goals)
1970–1979	South Melbourne	171 (101)
- ^{1} Playing statistics correct to the end of 1979.

Gary Brice (born 7 October 1948) is a former Australian rules footballer who played with South Melbourne in the VFL during the 1970s.

A solidly built wingman who could play at half forward, Brice started his career at Port Melbourne in the Victorian Football Association, before being recruited by South Melbourne in 1970. After 171 games at South, he returned to Port Melbourne as captain-coach in 1980, and coached there until 1983, leading the club to three successive premierships from 1980 until 1982. He returned for one further year as coach in 1985, and he was the coach of the Association's representative team from 1982 until 1985 – including in 1984, when he was a specialist coach at Essendon in the VFL. He later coached ailing VFA club Camberwell in the 1990 season, in which it was winless; Brice walked out on the club less than a month before the start of the 1991 season, and the club withdrew permanently from the VFA within a week.

In August 2003 he was selected to coach Port Melbourne's official 'Team of the Century'.
