= Bob Brownhill =

Australian rules footballer

Personal information
- Full name: Bob Brownhill
- Born: 5 December 1943
- Original team: Richmond Citizens
- Height: 179 cm (5 ft 10 in)
- Weight: 80 kg (176 lb)

Playing career^{1}
Years	Club	Games (Goals)
1963	Richmond	4 (0)
- ^{1} Playing statistics correct to the end of 1963.

Bob Brownhill (born 5 December 1943) is a former Australian rules footballer who played with Richmond in the Victorian Football League (VFL).
