= Barry Schmidt =

Australian rules footballer (1944–2025)

Personal information
- Full name: Barry Schmidt
- Born: 15 February 1944
- Died: 30 September 2025 (aged 81)
- Original team: Foundation Youth
- Height: 180 cm (5 ft 11 in)
- Weight: 75 kg (165 lb)

Playing career
Years	Club	Games (Goals)
1965	Carlton	4 (0)

Barry Schmidt (15 February 1944 – 30 September 2025) was an Australian rules footballer who played for the Carlton Football Club in the Victorian Football League (VFL).
