= Alan Mannix =

Australian rules footballer (born 1947)

Personal information
- Nickname: Doc
- Born: 9 May 1947 (age 79)
- Original team: Crib Point
- Height: 182 cm (6 ft 0 in)
- Weight: 73 kg (161 lb)

Playing career^{1}
Years	Club	Games (Goals)
1965–1972	Footscray	112 (44)
- ^{1} Playing statistics correct to the end of 1972.

Career highlights
- Footscray night premiership: 1967; Coburg best and fairest: 1973 & 1976; Coburg VFA premiership: 1974; Coburg club captain: 1977; Werribee best and fairest: 1979; Werribee captain-coach: 1980

Alan Mannix (born 9 May 1947) is a former Australian rules footballer who played with Footscray in the Victorian Football League (VFL).

== Career ==
=== Footscray ===
Mannix, a wingman and half forward, was 17 years old when he debuted for Footscray in the 1965 VFL season, after coming to the club from Crib Point. Although he never played a VFL final, he was a member of the Footscray team that won the night premiership in 1967. He celebrated his 100th league game in 1971, against Fitzroy, but was injured in the third quarter and required an operation for a lacerated kidney.

=== VFA ===
Following his eighth and final VFL season in 1972, Mannix left to play in the Victorian Football Association (VFA). Mannix went to Coburg with a clearance, paying the $500 transfer fee out of his own pocket.

Mannix played 110 games for Coburg, making him one of a small group of players to play more than 100 games for a VFL club and a VFA club. He won a 2nd Division premiership in 1974, finished third in voting for the 1975 J. J. Liston Trophy, won the club's best and fairest award twice, in 1973 and 1976, then was rewarded with the captaincy in 1977.

He also won a best and fairest for Werribee, in 1979. The following year he captain-coached Werribee for the season.

Coburg named Mannix on a wing in the club's Team of the Century.
