= Mark Buckley (Australian footballer) =

Australian rules footballer

Personal information
- Full name: Mark Buckley
- Born: 25 August 1962 (age 64)
- Original team: St Mark's
- Height: 179 cm (5 ft 10 in)
- Weight: 90 kg (198 lb)

Playing career^{1}
Years	Club	Games (Goals)
1982–1985	Carlton	27 (35)
1985	St Kilda	7 (4)
1987	Brisbane Bears	4 (2)
Total		38 (41)
- ^{1} Playing statistics correct to the end of 1987.

Mark Buckley (born 25 August 1962) is a former Australian rules footballer who played with Carlton, St Kilda and the Brisbane Bears in the Victorian Football League (VFL) during the 1980s.

Recruited from St Mark's, Buckley participated in a Carlton Under-19s premiership in 1979, not playing seniors until 1982. His four games in 1982 all came in the home and away season wins, with Carlton going on to win a second successive premiership.

Buckley had become the third member of his family to play at Carlton, with his elder brother Stephen making six appearances in the 1980 VFL season and their father Brian playing over 100 games.

In the opening round of the 1983 VFL season, against Richmond, Buckley replaced an injured Ross Ditchburn at full-forward during the match and kicked six goals. He was a regular fixture in the team for the rest of the season and kicked 29 goals from 20 games. The following season he played just twice, with Western Australian star Warren Ralph taking his spot as a key forward.

After playing only one game in the first half of the 1985 VFL season, Buckley transferred to St Kilda midyear, playing seven games.

Buckley did not play a senior VFL game in 1986 and the following year moved to a third club, Brisbane, who were making their league debut. He had 17 disposals and two goals in his first game for the Bears, against Fitzroy, but made just three further appearances.

In 1988 Buckley transferred to South Australian National Football League (SANFL) club Norwood but could only play eight games in two seasons, kicking six goals, before his retirement at the end of the 1989 season.
