= Barry Teague =

Australian rules footballer

Personal information
- Full name: Barry Teague
- Born: 19 March 1946 (age 80)
- Original team: Moorabbin
- Height: 170 cm (5 ft 7 in)
- Weight: 67 kg (148 lb)

Playing career^{1}
Years	Club	Games (Goals)
1965–1967	Richmond	3 (1)
- ^{1} Playing statistics correct to the end of 1967.

Barry Teague (born 19 March 1946) is a former Australian rules footballer who played for the Richmond Football Club in the Victorian Football League (VFL).
