= Norm Goss Jr. =

Australian rules footballer

Norman John Goss

Personal information
- Born: 3 March 1951 (age 75)
- Original team: Port Melbourne (VFA)
- Height: 177 cm (5 ft 10 in)
- Weight: 78 kg (172 lb)

Playing career^{1}
Years	Club	Games (Goals)
1968–1971	Port Melbourne	63 (134)
1972–1977	South Melbourne	121 (161)
1978–1982	Hawthorn	81 (123)
Total		265 (418)
- ^{1} Playing statistics correct to the end of 1982.

Norman John Goss (born 3 March 1951) is a former Australian rules footballer who played with South Melbourne and Hawthorn in the Australian Football League (AFL).

Goss was originally from Port Melbourne, the club that his father had played for. He was their best and fairest in back to back years, 1969 and 1970.

In 1972 Goss joined South Melbourne and in 1974 he won the Bob Skilton Medal for their best and fairest player and also topped their goalkicking for the year with 37 goals.

He moved to Hawthorn in 1978 and was a premiership player in his debut season.

In August 2003 he was selected in Port Melbourne's official 'Team of the Century'. Norm was chairman of selectors for Allan Jeans at Hawthorn and Stan Alves at StKilda.
