= Danny Hibbert =

Australian rules footballer

Personal information
- Full name: Danny Hibbert
- Born: 16 November 1948 (age 77)
- Original team: Montmorency (DVFL)
- Height: 178 cm (5 ft 10 in)
- Weight: 73 kg (161 lb)
- Position: Centreman

Playing career^{1}
Years	Club	Games (Goals)
1968–1970	Collingwood	20 (12)
- ^{1} Playing statistics correct to the end of 1970.

Danny Hibbert (born 16 November 1948) is a former Australian rules footballer who played for Collingwood in the Victorian Football League (VFL).

Hibbert was at Collingwood for three seasons. During the 1969 VFL season, he scored five goals in a win over Geelong. Later, in the 1970s, he played with Dandenong and won the J. J. Liston Trophy in 1976.
