= Dandenong Football Club =

Names
- Full name: Dandenong Football Club
- Nickname(s): Dandies, Redlegs

Club details
- Founded: 1874; 152 years ago
- Dissolved: 1994; 32 years ago
- Colours: Navy blue Red
- Competition: Federal Football League (1953–1957); Victorian Football Association (1958–1994)
- Premierships: FFL (1): 1953; VFA Div 1 (3): 1967; 1971; 1991; VFA Div 2 (1): 1962
- Ground: Shepley Oval

Uniforms
Home

The Dandenong Football Club, nicknamed the Redlegs, was an Australian rules football club based in the Melbourne suburb of Dandenong. The club competed in the Victorian Football Association (VFA) from 1958 until 1994.

== History ==
From 1953 to 1957, the club played in the Federal Football League. Success was immediate by winning the 1953 flag. Near success continued by being runner-up in 1954 and 1955, a third in 1956 and fifth in 1957. In all, the club had 72 wins compared to 25 losses and a draw.

=== VFA ===
Dandenong joined the Victorian Football Association from the Federal League for the 1958 season, and found itself in Division 2 when then Association was partitioned in 1961. The club originally played at the Dandenong Showgrounds, before moving to Shepley Oval in 1962. The club was runner-up to Northcote in Division 2 in 1961, then won the 1962 Division 2 premiership against Prahran to earn promotion to Division 1.

Within three years, Dandenong became one of the power clubs in Division 1. It reached its first finals campaign in 1965, winning the minor premiership that season, and seldom missed the finals from then until the late 1970s.

In a ten-year period from 1967 until 1976, Dandenong played in six Grand Finals for two premierships. Both premierships came in controversial Grand Finals:

- 1967 Grand Final: Dandenong defeated a Port Melbourne team which nearly walked off the ground and forfeited the game in the second quarter in protest at the umpiring;
- 1971 Grand Final: Dandenong defeated Preston; but only after Preston unsuccessfully protested to have Dandenong's six-point victory amended to a draw.

Over that time, Dandenong was runner-up to Preston in 1969, Oakleigh in 1972, Geelong West in 1975, and Port Melbourne in 1976. The club enjoyed the services of full-forward Jim 'Frosty' Miller, a local west Gippslander who won the VFA goalkicking on six occasions, and it established itself as one of the wealthiest clubs in the competition, able to attract quality former Victorian Football League players.

The popularity of the VFA as a whole declined in the late 1970s and into the 1980s, and Dandenong was one of many clubs which struggled financially during that time. By 1983, the club was $100,000 in debt, and could no longer attract the high class of players it had fielded in the 1970s, relying instead on local talent; this in turn led to poorer onfield performances and a waning supporter base. The club finished last in Division 1 in 1984, and was relegated to Division 2 the following year.

Following the VFA's contraction to a single division in 1989, Dandenong and fellow Division 2 battlers Camberwell and Sunshine were completely uncompetitive at the top level, with Dandenong's sole win in 1989 coming against the winless Camberwell. But while Sunshine and Camberwell soon folded, Dandenong fought back, raising $140,000 in sponsorship from local businesses resulting in the recruitment of five former VFL players, including Tony Elshaug as captain-coach. Only two years later, Elshaug led Dandenong to the 1991 premiership, with a nine-point Grand Final victory against Werribee.

From then, the club suffered from bad financial problems, in large part because it spent more money than it could afford during the 1991 season. In the week prior to the 1993 season, the club decided to deal with its debts totalling more than $220,000 by liquidating and disbanding the club, then immediately reforming as a new legal entity, which was known as Dandenong Redlegs Ltd. The new club played two seasons. At the end of 1994, when administration of the VFA was turned over to the Victorian State Football League, Dandenong left the Association as part of the VSFL's efforts to reduce the size of the VFA and align it with the TAC Cup; Dandenong's identity was carried on within the TAC Cup from 1995, when the Southern Stingrays club moved to Shepley Oval and was renamed the Dandenong Stingrays.

Lew Wright is the club record holder for most games, appearing in 210 senior games for Dandenong.

== Premierships ==
- Federal Football League: 1953
- VFA Division 1: 1967, 1971, 1991
- VFA Division 2: 1962

== VFA club records ==
Highest Score	40.17 (257) v Mordialloc, Round 8, 1987, Shepley Oval
Lowest Score	1.5 (11) v Box Hill, Round 4, 1958, Box Hill City Oval
Greatest Winning Margin	188 points v Oakleigh, Round 8, 1992, Shepley Oval
Greatest Losing Margin	191 points v Port Melbourne, Round 10, 1984, North Port Oval
Lowest Winning Score	6.13 (49) v Camberwell 5.6 (36), Round 5, 1960, Camberwell Sportsground
Highest Losing Score	24.8 (152) v Oakleigh 26.7 (163), Round 2, 1985, Shepley Oval
