= Port Melbourne Football Club =

Australian rules football club

Names
- Full name: Port Melbourne Football Club
- Former name: Sandridge Football Club (1874−1884)
- Nickname(s): Borough, Port

2025 season
- After finals: VFL: DNQ; VFLW: DNQ
- Home-and-away season: VFL: 17th of 21; VFLW: 7th of 12

Club details
- Founded: 1874; 152 years ago
- Colours: Blue Red
- Competition: VFL: Men's; VFLW: Women's; VBFL: Blind (mixed)
- President: Michael Shulman
- CEO: Dale Christie
- Coach: VFL: Brendan McCartney; VFLW: Tom Chitsos
- Captain(s): VFL: Tom Hird; VFLW: Olivia Barton and Eloise Ashley-Cooper
- Membership (2024): ▲1,410
- Premierships: VFA/VFL (Div 1) (17): 1897; 1901; 1922; 1940; 1941; 1947; 1953; 1964; 1966; 1974; 1976; 1977; 1980; 1981; 1982; 2011; 2017; VFLW (1): 2023
- Ground: North Port Oval (capacity: 10,000)

Uniforms
Home

Other information
- Official website: portmelbournefc.com.au

The Port Melbourne Football Club, nicknamed the Borough, is an Australian rules football club based in the inner-Melbourne suburb of Port Melbourne. The club was founded in 1874 and has been competing in the Victorian Football League (VFL) – formerly known as the Victorian Football Association (VFA) – since 1886, and the VFL Women's (VFLW) since 2021.

Port Melbourne is the most successful club in the VFA/VFL, having won 17 senior men's top division premierships, three more than its nearest rival Williamstown. It has also won one VFLW premiership.

Port Melbourne is also the only VFA/VFL club never to have been relegated to the second division when the VFA had both first and second divisions. The club has maintained an independent and stand-alone status, without being in a formal reserves affiliation with a club from the Australian Football League (AFL) for all but five years of its history.

Consequently, Port Melbourne is considered one of the strongest Victorian-based football clubs that does not compete in the AFL. The club has had a women's team in the VFL Women's (VFLW) competition since 2021, and in the past it has fielded premiership-winning teams in the now-defunct VFL reserves competition. In 2024, the club fielded its first team in the Victorian Blind Football League (VBFL).

== History ==
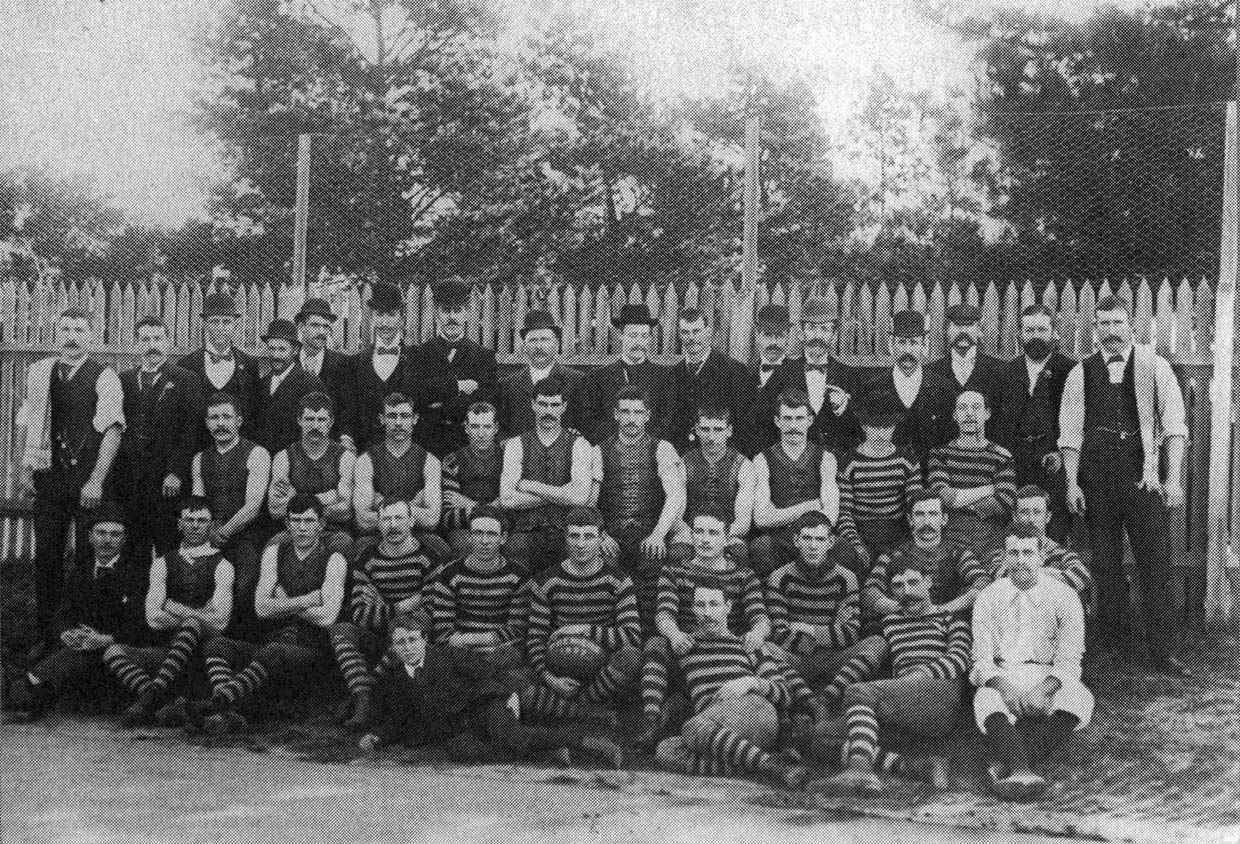
Port Melbourne team that won its first premiership in 1897

The Port Melbourne Football Club was formed in 1874 as the Sandridge Football Club. It changed its name to Port Melbourne in 1884, in line with the renaming of the municipality.

Port Melbourne joined the senior ranks of the Victorian Football Association (VFA) in 1886, with its inaugural team formed in large part from members of the powerful nearby South Melbourne Football Club which had dominated metropolitan football in 1885. The club has played in every VFA/VFL season since that time. In 1897, Port Melbourne was left out of the group of eight clubs which formed the breakaway VFL competition, despite having regularly been about the sixth- or seventh- best performing team onfield. Historian Terry Keenan theorised that the likeliest reason for Port Melbourne's exclusion was the reputation for the poor behaviour that its players and spectators had developed over the previous decade; its rivalry with and proximity to South Melbourne and the fact that Port Melbourne had supported the gate equalisation measures which the breakaway clubs were trying to escape were also speculated to have contributed to the decision.

The club, and the suburb of Port Melbourne in general, were heavily associated with wharf labourers and the union movement. During a 1928 waterfront strike in Melbourne, a wharf labourer protesting the use of scab labour was shot by police; as a result, the club banned any police from playing with them. The policy remained in place until the late 1950s.

Port Melbourne went on to become one of the strongest clubs in the VFA, and today still attracts some of the biggest crowds to its games. The club had very strong links with the Port Melbourne community, arguably the strongest community relationship within the VFA; local juniors often held stronger aspirations to play for Port Melbourne than for the VFL's South Melbourne – which by the 1950s was perennially struggling and to which the Port Melbourne area was zoned – and even players as highly decorated as Brownlow Medallists Peter Bedford and Bob Skilton returned to play with Port Melbourne after their VFL careers. Over the twenty-eight seasons from 1961 until 1988 that the VFA was partitioned into two divisions, Port Melbourne played every season in the first division – a distinction shared only with the Sandringham.

Traditionally, Port Melbourne's greatest rivals are Williamstown, Sandringham, and Coburg. As of 2025, all four teams continue to play in the VFL. Prior to the original breakaway of the VFL from the VFA in 1897, Port Melbourne's greatest rival was South Melbourne.

Since the AFL reserves competition merged with the Victorian Football League in 2000, Port Melbourne has been involved in two affiliations: with the Sydney Swans (2001–2002), and with the Kangaroos (2003–2005); since 2006, Port Melbourne has existed as a stand-alone VFL club. The club has fielded a team in the VFL Women's competition since 2021.

In under-age football, Port Melbourne has been affiliated with the Oakleigh Chargers NAB League team since the 1999 season, and the Chargers adopted Port Melbourne's colours as part of the affiliation. Port Melbourne had previously been affiliated with the Geelong Falcons (1996–1998), and in 1995 was part of a three-way affiliation which saw it share the Calder Cannons and Western Jets with Williamstown and Coburg.

In 2024, Port Melbourne joined the Victorian Blind Football League (VBFL), becoming the first VFL club to do so.

The club's onfield nickname is the Borough or Boroughs. Like many clubs, its earliest nickname was geographical, and the Borough nickname came from the club's location in what was once the Borough of Port Melbourne; the name stuck, even after the area was upgraded to the status of town in 1893, and eventually city in 1919. Unlike most other clubs, Port Melbourne never adopted a more modern nickname based on an animal or a profession, and remains known as the Borough. The name was sometimes written as Burra or Burras, and in the 1970s and 1980s the nickname was sometimes depicted with a kookaburra.

== Club jumper ==
The Port Melbourne Football Club's guernsey is royal blue with red vertical stripes.

=== Uniform evolution ===
1889 –1897	1897–1908	1909–present

== Club song ==
The official Port Melbourne Football Club song is called "It's a Grand Old Flag" (sung to the tune of George M. Cohan's 1906 song "You're a Grand Old Flag"), which is also the club name and basis for the club songs of Casey, Maribyrnong Park, and Melbourne.

It's a grand old flag, it's a high-flying flag,

It's the emblem for me and for you;

It's the emblem of the team we love,

The team of the Red and the Blue.

Every heart beats true for the Red and the Blue,

And we sing this song to you:

Should old acquaintance be forgot,

Keep your eye on the Red and the Blue.

== 2011 season ==
In 2011, Port Melbourne completed a perfect season, winning all eighteen home-and-away games, then three finals matches, culminating in a 56-point win against Williamstown in the Grand Final. It was the first perfect season in the VFA/VFL first division since 1918, and the first to not be shortened by war.

== Team of the century ==
The Port Melbourne team of the century was selected in August 2003:

Port Melbourne
B:	Stan Plumridge	Joe Garbutt	Vic Aanensen
HB:	David King	Bob Kelsey	Bob Withers
C:	Bill Swan	Peter Bedford	Billy McGee
HF:	Rob Freyer	Ted Freyer	Brian Walsh
F:	Bob Bonnett	Fred Cook	Tommy Lahiff
Foll:	Frank Johnson	Graeme Anderson	Bill Findlay
Int:	David Holt	Reg Murray	Norm Goss Jr.
Int:	Bill Bedford	Carl Bowen	Gary Brice
Coach:	Gary Brice		

== Honours ==
Premierships
Competition	Level	Wins	Years won
Victorian Football League	Seniors	17	1897, 1901, 1922, 1940, 1941, 1947, 1953, 1964, 1966, 1974, 1976, 1977, 1980, 1981, 1982, 2011, 2017
VFL Women's	Seniors	1	2023
VFA/VFL Reserves	Division 1	14	1944, 1949, 1951, 1959, 1964, 1965, 1968, 1970, 1972, 1973, 1974, 1980, 1996, 2004
VFA/VFL Thirds	Division 1	2	1952, 1993
Other titles and honours
Centenary Cup	Seniors	1	1977
Finishing positions
Victorian Football League	Minor premiership	20	1941, 1947, 1951, 1952, 1953, 1954, 1955, 1966, 1974, 1976, 1977, 1978, 1981, 1987, 1993, 2003, 2004, 2008, 2011, 2014
Victorian Football League	Grand Finalists	21	1902, 1923, 1925, 1928, 1929, 1945, 1950, 1951, 1952, 1954, 1955, 1956, 1957, 1965, 1967, 1987, 1993, 2002, 2004, 2008, 2012
Victorian Football League	Wooden spoons	3	1909, 1936, 2006

=== Grand final performances ===
- 1897 – runners-up North Melbourne
- 1901 – runners-up Richmond
- 1922 – Port Melbourne 9.6 (60) d Footscray 8.10 (58) (Crowd: 22,000)
- 1940 – Port Melbourne 23.22 (160) d Prahran 17.11 (113) (Crowd: 30,882)
- 1941 – Port Melbourne 15.18 (108) d Coburg 11.23 (89) (Crowd: 36,289)
- 1947 – Port Melbourne 15.13 (103) d Sandringham 11.8 (74) (Crowd: 24,000)
- 1953 – Port Melbourne 21.15 (141) d Yarraville 12.9 (81) (Crowd: 40,000)
- 1964 – Port Melbourne 14.17 (101) d Williamstown 10.5 (65) (Crowd: 20,000)
- 1966 – Port Melbourne 13.12 (90) d Waverley 6.11 (47) (Crowd: 20,000)
- 1974 – Port Melbourne 22.20 (152) d Oakleigh 11.17 (83) (Crowd: 23,936)
- 1976 – Port Melbourne 19.18 (132) d Dandenong 10.15 (75) (Crowd: 32,317)
- 1977 – Port Melbourne 23.19 (157) d Sandringham 7.15 (57) (Crowd: 29,664)
- 1980 – Port Melbourne 11.15 (81) d Coburg 10.10 (70) (Crowd: 22,010)
- 1981 – Port Melbourne 32.19 (211) d Preston 15.8 (98) (Crowd: 20,186)
- 1982 – Port Melbourne 21.15 (141) d Preston 20.14 (134) (Crowd: 20,732)
- 2011 – Port Melbourne 22.12 (144) d Williamstown 13.10 (88) (Crowd: 11,896)
- 2017 – Port Melbourne 11.8 (74) d Richmond 10.10 (70) (Crowd: 17,159)
- Total premierships – 17
- Total grand finals – 33

== Records ==
- League History: VFA/VFL 1886–15, 1918–41, 1945–present
- Record Attendance: 36,289 v the Coburg Lions in 1941
- Most Games: 253 by Fred Cook
- Most Goals: 1210 by Fred Cook
- Liston Medallists: E. Hyde (1930), W. Findlay (1946), F. Johnson (1952), V. Aanensen (1979, 1981), S. Allender (1980), W. Swan (1982, 1983), S. Harkins (1990), S. Valenti (2010, 2011)
- Highest Score: 43.29 (287) v Sandringham in 1941
- Lowest Score: 0.2 (2) v Prahran in 1902
- Longest Winning Run: 28 (2011–2012)
- Longest Losing Run: 14 (1909)

== Coaches ==
- Percy Wilson (1927–1929)
- Charlie Stanbridge (1930–31)
- Percy Wilson (1932)
- B Lovett (1933)
- Gus Dobrigh (1934)
- Tommy Lahiff, Ron Shapter (1935)
- B Rudd (1936)
- Jack Bissett (1937)
- H Crompton (1937)
- Tommy Lahiff (1937–38)
- Frank Kelly (1940–41)
- Tommy Lahiff (1941, 1945–46)
- Bill Findlay (1947–48)
- Jim Cleary (1949–1952)
- Don Fraser (1953–55)
- Frank Johnson (1956–57)
- Tom Brooker (1958–59)
- Don Furness (1960–61)
- Tommy Lahiff (1962)
- Laurie Mithen (1963–65)
- Brian Buckley (1966–68)
- Bob Bonnett (1969–71)
- Ian Collins (1972–73)
- Norm Brown (1974–78)
- Peter McKenna (1979)
- Gary Brice (1980–1983)
- Warwick Irwin (1984)
- Gary Brice (1985)
- Peter Chisnall (1986)
- G Allen (1987–88)
- Brett Yorgey (1989–90)
- Doug Searl (1991–92)
- Damian Drum (1993)
- David Cloke (1994)
- Shane Molloy (1995)
- Neil Ross (1996–1998)
- Darren Crocker (1999)
- David Dunbar (2000–2003)
- Gerard FitzGerald (2004)
- Saade Ghazi (2005–2007)
- Gary Ayres (2008–2021)
- Adam Skrobalak (2022–2024)
- Brendan McCartney (2025-current)

== Women's team ==
Port Melbourne have fielded a VFL Women's team since 2021, in affiliation with the Richmond Football Club. They have won one premiership as of 2024.

Port Melbourne VFLW honour roll
Season	Final position	Coach	Captain	Best and fairest	Leading goal kicker
2020	Season cancelled due to the COVID-19 pandemic				
2021	3rd	Lachlan Harris	Melissa Kuys	Claire Dyett	Emily Harley (14)
2022	10th	Sean Buncle	Claire Dyett/Melissa Kuys	Kaitlyn O'Keefe	Sophie Locke (6)
2023	Premiers	Sean Buncle	Claire Dyett	Lauren Caruso	Emily Harley (9)
2024	6th	Sean Buncle	Olivia Barton	TBA	Emily Harley (13)

== See also ==
- 1967 VFA Grand Final
- Port Melbourne Railway United Football Club

== Sources ==
- Atkinson, G. (1982) Everything you ever wanted to know about Australian rules football but couldn't be bothered asking, The Five Mile Press: Melbourne. ISBN 0 86788 009 0.
- Terry Keenan. 2006. Unduly Rough Play – A History of the Port Melbourne Football Club, Volume 2 1918 – 1944. Albert Park: Eucalyptus Press
- Terry Keenan. 2004. Kicking into the Wind – A History of the Formative Years of the Port Melbourne Football Club 1874–1917. Petersham: Walla Walla Press
- Terry Keenan. 1999. A Taste of Port. Albert Park: Eucalyptus Press
- Terry Keenan. A Family Feud. Port Melbourne: Port Melbourne Historical and Preservation Society.
- Terry Keenan. Keeping Out the Riff-Raff. Port Melbourne: Port Melbourne Historical and Preservation Society.
- Marc Fiddian. The VFA – A History of the Victorian Football Association 1877–1995.
