= 1991 VFA season =

110th season of the Victorian Football Association

Overview
- Date: 6 April – 22 September 1991
- Teams: 13 (12 from round 5 onwards)
- Premiers: Dandenong; 3rd premiership
- Minor premiers: Werribee; 1st minor premiership
- J. J. Liston Trophy: Anthony Eames (Werribee – 22 votes)
- Leading goalkicker: Rohan Welsh (Dandenong – 84 goals)

The 1991 VFA season was the 110th season of the Victorian Football Association (VFA), an Australian rules football competition played in the state of Victoria. The season began on 6 April and concluded on 22 September, comprising an 18-match home-and-away season over 20 rounds, followed by a four-week finals series.

The premiership was won by the Dandenong Football Club for the third time, after it defeated Werribee by nine points in the 1991 VFA Grand Final. It was the club's final premiership before it withdrew from the Association at the end of the 1994 season.

== Association membership ==
Two clubs withdrew from the Association in 1991: Camberwell, which withdrew shortly before the start of the season; and Brunswick-Broadmeadows, which withdrew after playing three matches. As a result, the playing membership of the Association was reduced to twelve, the fewest since 1950.

=== Withdrawal of Camberwell ===
The Camberwell Football Club had been in a weak on-field and off-field position since 1985. It had managed to maintain a reasonable team at Division 2 level until 1988; but, after the second division was abandoned at the start of 1989, it had been unable to compile a playing list which was competitive against the former Division 1 clubs, and had consequently endured two consecutive winless seasons. The club intended to compete in the 1991 VFA season and made full preparations to do so; however, after suffering a twelve-goal loss in a pre-season match against Bendigo Football League club South Bendigo during March, the club recognised that its playing list was even less competitive than its 1990 list. On 24 March, coach Gary Brice decided to walk out on the club rather than face another futile season; and within a week, the club announced its withdrawal from the 1991 season, stating that it would be better to attempt to consolidate its position and attempt to return for the 1992 season, rather than further ruin both its own reputation and the reputation of the Association by fielding an uncompetitive team. The club never managed to return to the Association; it played in the Victorian Amateur Football Association from 1992 until 1994 before folding.

=== Withdrawal and folding of Brunswick-Broadmeadows ===
The final Brunswick-Broadmeadows match, a 97-point loss to Oakleigh in round 4 on 5 May 1991

The financially struggling Brunswick Football Club had merged with the Broadmeadows Football Club in October 1989 in the hope of establishing a plan for future viability. However, throughout the 1990 season, fighting between Brunswick and Broadmeadows factions of the board had hindered the club's efforts to improve its situation, prompting the Association to sack the club's board in August 1990 and appoint an administrator. When the club was returned to a new board in September, it was still more than $250,000 in debt and at risk of Broadmeadows withdrawing from the merger; the Association recommended the club withdraw and join a suburban league, but it pressed on with preparations for the 1991 VFA season.

The club tried to raise funds over the summer to clear its debts, but had too few fans and too few administrators; as a result it was left unable to make its match payments to players for the 1990 season, resulting in an exodus of most of its senior players. The inexperienced team which remained suffered three huge losses to begin the 1991 season – including a 250-point loss to eventual premiers Dandenong and a 97-point loss to eventual wooden-spooners Oakleigh – and announced its withdrawal from the season on 6 May 1991. Like Camberwell, Brunswick-Broadmeadows remained a non-playing member of the Association with the hope of consolidating its position and returning to playing in 1992, but this never happened, with the club folding soon after. The three games that the club had played were expunged from the VFA's records, and the rest of the fixture was redrawn to ensure all teams played an equal number of games.

== Home-and-away season ==
In the home-and-away season, each team played eighteen games; the top five then contested the finals under the McIntyre final five system. The primary finals venue was North Port Oval, and the grand final was played at Princes Park.

=== Round 1 ===
	Round 1
Saturday, 6 April (2:10 pm)	Williamstown 15.12 (102)	def.	Springvale 8.16 (64)	Williamstown Cricket Ground
Saturday, 13 April (2:10 pm)	Port Melbourne 21.21 (147)	def.	Prahran 19.11 (125)	North Port Oval
Sunday, 14 April (2:10 pm)	Frankston 21.14 (140)	def.	Preston 11.14 (80)	Frankston Park
Sunday, 14 April (2:10 pm)	Coburg 14.26 (110)	def. by	Sandringham 22.10 (142)	Coburg City Oval
Sunday, 14 April (2:10 pm)	Box Hill 14.18 (102)	def. by	Werribee 21.15 (141)	Box Hill City Oval
Sunday, 14 April (2:10 pm) (result expunged)	Dandenong 44.29 (293)	def.	Brunswick-Broadmeadows 6.7 (43)	Shepley Oval
	Bye; Oakleigh
Prior to the result being expunged, 44.29 (293) was Dandenong's highest-ever score, surpassing the record of 440.17 (257) it had set in the 1987 Division 2 season against Mordialloc. The 250-point margin was also Dandenong's biggest win, surpassing the 146-point margin it set against Camberwell in 1990 (the record was later officially broken against Oakleigh in 1992). It was also Brunswick-Broadmeadows' biggest loss.

=== Round 2 ===
	Round 2
Saturday, 20 April (2:10 pm)	Oakleigh 10.14 (74)	def. by	Box Hill 23.15 (153)	Warrawee Park
Sunday, 21 April (2:10 pm)	Preston 13.12 (90)	def. by	Coburg 14.12 (96)	Preston City Oval
Sunday, 21 April (2:10 pm)	Springvale 13.14 (92)	def.	Frankston 10.9 (69)	Springvale Reserve
Sunday, 21 April (2:10 pm)	Werribee 13.19 (97)	def.	Williamstown 14.9 (93)	Chirnside Park
Sunday, 21 April (2:10 pm)	Prahran 11.12 (78)	def. by	Dandenong 34.13 (217)	Toorak Park
Sunday, 21 April (2:10 pm)	Sandringham 12.11 (83)	def. by	Port Melbourne 14.6 (90)	Beach Road Oval
	Bye; Brunswick-Broadmeadows

=== Round 3 ===
	Round 3
Saturday, 27 April (2:10 pm)	Frankston 13.11 (89)	def. by	Williamstown 16.16 (112)	Frankston Park
Sunday, 28 April (2:10 pm)	Oakleigh 18.14 (122)	def. by	Werribee 21.14 (140)	Warrawee Park
Sunday, 28 April (2:10 pm)	Port Melbourne 24.25 (169)	def.	Preston 19.14 (128)	North Port Oval
Sunday, 28 April (2:10 pm)	Dandenong 13.11 (89)	def. by	Sandringham 20.19 (139)	Shepley Oval
Sunday, 28 April (2:10 pm)	Coburg 14.12 (96)	def.	Springvale 13.15 (93)	Coburg City Oval
Sunday, 28 April (2:10 pm) (result expunged)	Box Hill 35.24 (234)	def.	Brunswick-Broadmeadows 10.13 (73)	Box Hill City Oval
	Bye; Prahran
Box Hill kicked 13.4 (82) in the third quarter against Brunswick-Broadmeadows, which – until the result was expunged – surpassed its previous third quarter score record of 13.3 (81), set against Sunshine in the 1984 Division 2 season.

=== Round 4 ===
	Round 4
Saturday, 4 May (2:10 pm)	Werribee 20.22 (142)	def.	Frankston 14.16 (100)	North Port Oval
Sunday, 5 May (2:10 pm)	Preston 17.14 (116)	def.	Dandenong 15.13 (103)	Preston City Oval
Sunday, 5 May (2:10 pm)	Prahran 15.18 (108)	def. by	Box Hill 22.23 (155)	Toorak Park
Sunday, 5 May (2:10 pm)	Williamstown 16.16 (112)	def. by	Coburg 22.15 (147)	Williamstown Cricket Ground
Sunday, 5 May (2:10 pm)	Springvale 17.19 (121)	def. by	Port Melbourne 20.19 (139)	Springvale Reserve
Sunday, 5 May (2:10 pm) (result expunged)	Brunswick-Broadmeadows 14.18 (102)	def. by	Oakleigh 30.19 (199)	Gillon Oval
	Bye; Sandringham
Although the result was expunged, this was Brunswick-Broadmeadows' last senior VFA game before the club withdrew from the 1991 season and subsequently folded. Oakleigh forward Rino Pretto kicked 13 goals during the game.

=== Round 5 ===
	Round 5
Saturday, 11 May (2:10 pm)	Box Hill 21.10 (136)	def.	Sandringham 18.16 (124)	Box Hill City Oval
Sunday, 12 May (2:10 pm)	Dandenong 18.12 (120)	def.	Springvale 12.8 (80)	Shepley Oval
Sunday, 12 May (2:10 pm)	Port Melbourne 18.18 (126)	def.	Williamstown 14.9 (93)	North Port Oval
Sunday, 12 May (2:10 pm)	Coburg 12.16 (88)	def. by	Frankston 19.15 (129)	Coburg City Oval
Sunday, 12 May (2:10 pm)	Oakleigh 13.14 (92)	def. by	Prahran 27.16 (178)	Warrawee Park
Sunday, 12 May (2:10 pm)	Werribee 26.13 (169)	def.	Preston 14.17 (101)	Chirnside Park

=== Round 6 ===
	Round 6
Saturday, 18 May (2:10 pm)	Williamstown 21.9 (135)	def. by	Dandenong 34.11 (215)	North Port Oval
Sunday, 19 May (2:10 pm)	Preston 17.14 (116)	def. by	Box Hill 22.12 (144)	Preston City Oval
Sunday, 19 May (2:10 pm)	Frankston 15.16 (106)	def. by	Port Melbourne 20.12 (132)	Frankston Park
Sunday, 19 May (2:10 pm)	Coburg 26.19 (175)	def.	Werribee 21.12 (138)	Coburg City Oval
Sunday, 19 May (2:10 pm)	Sandringham 29.25 (199)	def.	Oakleigh 12.11 (83)	Beach Road Oval
Sunday, 19 May (2:10 pm)	Springvale 18.18 (126)	def.	Prahran 14.17 (101)	Springvale Reserve

=== Round 7 ===
	Round 7
Saturday, 25 May (2:10 pm)	Port Melbourne 21.17 (143)	def.	Coburg 13.25 (103)	North Port Oval
Sunday, 26 May (2:10 pm)	Box Hill 22.11 (143)	def.	Springvale 17.14 (116)	Box Hill City Oval
Sunday, 26 May (2:10 pm)	Dandenong 34.14 (218)	def.	Frankston 19.10 (124)	Shepley Oval
Sunday, 26 May (2:10 pm)	Oakleigh 17.12 (114)	def. by	Preston 22.14 (146)	Warrawee Park
Sunday, 26 May (2:10 pm)	Prahran 21.12 (138)	def. by	Werribee 25.20 (170)	Toorak Park
Sunday, 26 May (2:10 pm)	Sandringham 19.15 (129)	def.	Williamstown 19.12 (126)	Beach Road Oval

=== Round 8 ===
	Round 8
Saturday, 1 June (2:10 pm)	Werribee 20.13 (133)	def.	Port Melbourne 7.19 (61)	Chirnside Park
Sunday, 2 June (2:10 pm)	Williamstown 15.15 (105)	def.	Box Hill 5.18 (48)	Williamstown Cricket Ground
Sunday, 2 June (2:10 pm)	Frankston 13.14 (92)	def. by	Sandringham 14.14 (98)	Frankston Park
Sunday, 2 June (2:10 pm)	Coburg 10.11 (71)	def. by	Dandenong 17.20 (122)	Coburg City Oval
Sunday, 2 June (2:10 pm)	Springvale 14.13 (97)	def.	Oakleigh 3.20 (38)	Springvale Reserve
Sunday, 2 June (2:10 pm)	Preston 8.10 (58)	def. by	Prahran 22.12 (144)	Preston City Oval

=== Round 9 ===
	Round 9
Saturday, 8 June (2:10 pm)	Box Hill 11.16 (82)	def.	Coburg 8.9 (57)	Box Hill City Oval
Saturday, 8 June (2:10 pm)	Dandenong 24.24 (168)	def.	Oakleigh 2.4 (16)	Shepley Oval
Saturday, 8 June (2:10 pm)	Sandringham 12.20 (92)	def.	Prahran 14.7 (91)	Beach Road Oval
	Bye; Frankston, Port Melbourne, Preston, Springvale, Werribee, Williamstown
Oakleigh's score of 2.4 (16) was its lowest-ever in the VFA.

=== Round 10 ===
	Round 10
Saturday, 15 June (2:10 pm)	Prahran 9.10 (64)	def.	Frankston 7.11 (53)	North Port Oval
Sunday, 16 June (2:10 pm)	Springvale 19.12 (126)	def.	Preston 7.13 (55)	Springvale Reserve
Sunday, 16 June (2:10 pm)	Dandenong 18.12 (120)	def.	Port Melbourne 9.12 (66)	Shepley Oval
Sunday, 16 June (2:10 pm)	Williamstown 20.21 (141)	def.	Oakleigh 6.8 (44)	Williamstown Cricket Ground
Sunday, 16 June (2:10 pm)	Werribee 20.13 (133)	def.	Sandringham 12.15 (87)	Chirnside Park
	Bye; Box Hill, Coburg

=== Round 11 ===
	Round 11
Saturday, 22 June (2:10 pm)	Werribee 16.17 (113)	def.	Dandenong 12.23 (95)	North Port Oval
Sunday, 23 June (2:10 pm)	Oakleigh 8.10 (58)	def. by	Frankston 12.23 (95)	Warrawee Park
Sunday, 23 June (2:10 pm)	Coburg 7.13 (55)	def.	Prahran 4.6 (30)	Coburg City Oval
Sunday, 23 June (2:10 pm)	Preston 3.8 (26)	def. by	Williamstown 8.7 (55)	Preston City Oval
Sunday, 23 June (2:10 pm)	Williamstown 10.8 (68)	def.	Box Hill 7.8 (50)	North Port Oval
Sunday, 23 June (2:10 pm)	Springvale 6.4 (40)	def. by	Sandringham 7.8 (50)	Springvale Reserve

=== Round 12 ===
	Round 12
Saturday, 29 June (2:10 pm)	Prahran 9.11 (65)	drew with	Williamstown 9.11 (65)	Toorak Park
Sunday, 30 June (2:10 pm)	Box Hill 15.10 (100)	def.	Dandenong 14.14 (98)	Box Hill City Oval
Sunday, 30 June (2:10 pm)	Port Melbourne 13.24 (102)	def.	Oakleigh 12.12 (84)	North Port Oval
Sunday, 30 June (2:10 pm)	Werribee 15.20 (110)	def.	Springvale 10.10 (70)	Chirnside Park
	Bye; Coburg. Frankston, Preston, Sandringham

=== Round 13 ===
	Round 13
Saturday, 6 July (2:10 pm)	Sandringham 27.14 (176)	def.	Preston 8.12 (60)	Beach Road Oval
Sunday, 7 July (2:10 pm)	Oakleigh 13.14 (92)	def.	Coburg 10.12 (72)	Warrawee Park
Sunday, 7 July (2:10 pm)	Frankston 12.15 (87)	def. by	Box Hill 13.10 (88)	Frankston Park
	Bye; Dandenong, Port Melbourne, Prahran, Springvale, Werribee, Williamstown

=== Round 14 ===
	Round 14
Saturday, 13 July (2:10 pm)	Springvale 13.12 (90)	def.	Williamstown 5.10 (40)	Beach Road Oval
Sunday, 14 July (2:10 pm)	Oakleigh 8.8 (56)	def. by	Dandenong 17.8 (110)	Warrawee Park
Sunday, 14 July (2:10 pm)	Werribee 10.7 (67)	def. by	Box Hill 12.15 (87)	Chirnside Park
Sunday, 14 July (2:10 pm)	Sandringham 10.11 (71)	def. by	Coburg 21.19 (149)	Beach Road Oval
Sunday, 14 July (2:10 pm)	Preston 5.10 (40)	def. by	Frankston 9.14 (68)	Preston City Oval
Sunday, 14 July (2:10 pm)	Prahran 13.15 (93)	def.	Port Melbourne 7.9 (51)	Toorak Park

=== Round 15 ===
	Round 15
Saturday, 20 July (2:10 pm)	Port Melbourne 11.17 (83)	def. by	Sandringham 21.14 (140)	North Port Oval
Sunday, 21 July (2:10 pm)	Box Hill 28.16 (184)	def.	Oakleigh 8.10 (58)	Box Hill City Oval
Sunday, 21 July (2:10 pm)	Frankston 13.12 (90)	def. by	Springvale 21.16 (142)	Frankston Park
Sunday, 21 July (2:10 pm)	Coburg 12.14 (86)	def. by	Preston 19.10 (124)	Coburg City Oval
Sunday, 21 July (2:10 pm)	Dandenong 13.21 (99)	def.	Prahran 13.9 (87)	Shepley Oval
Sunday, 21 July (2:10 pm)	Williamstown 17.17 (119)	def. by	Werribee 18.16 (124)	Williamstown Cricket Ground

=== Round 16 ===
	Round 16
Saturday, 27 July (2:10 pm)	Springvale 12.8 (80)	def.	Coburg 11.12 (78)	North Port Oval
Sunday, 28 July (2:10 pm)	Box Hill 14.10 (94)	def. by	Prahran 17.9 (111)	Box Hill City Oval
Sunday, 28 July (2:10 pm)	Sandringham 15.15 (105)	def. by	Dandenong 22.15 (147)	Beach Road Oval
Sunday, 28 July (2:10 pm)	Williamstown 9.13 (67)	def. by	Frankston 10.15 (75)	Williamstown Cricket Ground
Sunday, 28 July (2:10 pm)	Werribee 18.18 (126)	def.	Oakleigh 7.10 (52)	Chirnside Park
Sunday, 28 July (2:10 pm)	Preston 2.10 (22)	def. by	Port Melbourne 14.13 (97)	Preston City Oval

=== Round 17 ===
	Round 17
Saturday, 3 August (2:10 pm)	Sandringham 12.9 (81)	def. by	Box Hill 24.8 (152)	North Port Oval
Sunday, 4 August (2:10 pm)	Springvale 6.15 (51)	def. by	Dandenong 12.19 (91)	Springvale Reserve
Sunday, 4 August (2:10 pm)	Frankston 13.18 (96)	def. by	Coburg 14.16 (100)	Frankston Park
Sunday, 4 August (2:10 pm)	Prahran 24.16 (160)	def.	Oakleigh 10.13 (73)	Toorak Park
Sunday, 4 August (2:10 pm)	Williamstown 20.17 (137)	def.	Port Melbourne 12.15 (87)	Williamstown Cricket Ground
Sunday, 4 August (2:10 pm)	Preston 10.5 (65)	def. by	Werribee 22.15 (147)	Preston City Oval

=== Round 18 ===
	Round 18
Saturday, 10 August (2:10 pm)	Port Melbourne 15.16 (106)	def. by	Frankston 22.14 (146)	North Port Oval
Sunday, 11 August (2:10 pm)	Prahran 13.14 (92)	def. by	Springvale 19.14 (128)	Toorak Park
Sunday, 11 August (2:10 pm)	Box Hill 21.16 (142)	def.	Northern Bullants 13.12 (90)	Box Hill City Oval
Sunday, 11 August (2:10 pm)	Werribee 19.17 (131)	def.	Coburg 17.7 (109)	Chirnside Park
Sunday, 11 August (2:10 pm)	Dandenong 28.6 (174)	def.	Williamstown 13.9 (87)	Shepley Oval
Sunday, 11 August (2:10 pm)	Oakleigh 11.5 (71)	def. by	Sandringham 13.8 (86)	Warrawee Park

=== Round 19 ===
	Round 19
Saturday, 17 August (2:10 pm)	Coburg 15.16 (106)	def. by	Williamstown 17.20 (122)	Coburg City Oval
Sunday, 18 August (2:10 pm)	Box Hill 7.12 (54)	def. by	Port Melbourne 23.18 (156)	Box Hill City Oval
Sunday, 18 August (2:10 pm)	Frankston 20.13 (133)	def.	Dandenong 17.8 (110)	Frankston Park
Sunday, 18 August (2:10 pm)	Oakleigh 28 (28)	def. by	Springvale 24.8 (152)	Warrawee Park
Sunday, 18 August (2:10 pm)	Prahran 20.16 (136)	def.	Preston 11.14 (80)	Toorak Park
Sunday, 18 August (2:10 pm)	Sandringham 19.17 (131)	def. by	Werribee 22.12 (144)	Beach Road Oval

=== Round 20 ===
	Round 20
Saturday, 24 August (2:10 pm)	Dandenong 10.8 (68)	def.	Box Hill 6.10 (46)	Shepley Oval
Sunday, 25 August (2:10 pm)	Coburg 16.13 (109)	def. by	Oakleigh 16.17 (113)	Coburg City Oval
Sunday, 25 August (2:10 pm)	Frankston 19.21 (135)	def.	Prahran 18.13 (121)	Frankston Park
Sunday, 25 August (2:10 pm)	Port Melbourne 19.19 (133)	def.	Werribee 15.20 (110)	North Port Oval
Sunday, 25 August (2:10 pm)	Preston 9.9 (63)	def. by	Springvale 30.16 (196)	Preston City Oval
Sunday, 25 August (2:10 pm)	Williamstown 25.15 (165)	def.	Sandringham 11.16 (82)	Williamstown Cricket Ground

== Ladder ==
Pos	Team	Pld	W	L	D	PF	PA	PP	Pts	Qualification
1	Werribee	18	15	3	0	2335	1823	128.1	60	Finals series
2	Dandenong (P)	18	13	5	0	2364	1603	147.5	52	Finals series
3	Box Hill	18	12	6	0	1960	1725	113.6	48	Finals series
4	Port Melbourne	18	12	6	0	1956	1848	105.8	48	Finals series
5	Springvale	18	10	8	0	1854	1505	123.2	40	Finals series
6	Sandringham	18	10	8	0	2015	1956	103.0	40	
7	Williamstown	18	8	9	1	1876	1788	104.9	34	
8	Frankston	18	8	10	0	1827	1858	98.3	32	
9	Prahran	18	7	10	1	1922	1890	101.7	30	
10	Coburg	18	7	11	0	1803	1910	94.4	28	
11	Preston	18	3	15	0	1453	2308	63.0	12	
12	Oakleigh	18	2	16	0	1267	2418	52.4	8	
–	Brunswick-Broadmeadows (W)	3	0	3	0	218	726	30.0	0	

Rules for classification: 1) points; 2) percentage; 3) number of points for.
(P) Premiers; (W) Club withdrew, record expunged

== Finals ==
=== Qualifying and elimination finals ===
	Elimination final
Saturday, 31 August	Port Melbourne 12.10 (82)	def. by	Springvale 14.12 (96)	North Port Oval (crowd: 3,900)

	Qualifying final
Sunday, 1 September	Dandenong 19.15 (129)	def.	Box Hill 16.7 (103)	North Port Oval (crowd: 3,750)

=== Semi-finals ===
	First semi-final
Saturday, 7 September	Box Hill 15.10 (100)	def.	Springvale 13.14 (92)	North Port Oval (crowd: 3,220)

	Second semi-final
Sunday, 8 September	Werribee 16.9 (105)	def.	Dandenong 11.27 (93)	North Port Oval (crowd: 5,150)

=== Preliminary final ===
	Preliminary final
Sunday, 15 September	Dandenong 24.15 (159)	def.	Box Hill 14.10 (94)	North Port Oval (crowd: 6,325)

=== Grand Final ===
The 1991 VFA Grand Final was a see-sawing contest with a close finish. After Werribee scored the first goal of the game, Dandenong scored the next four. Werribee then scored eight of the next nine goals, and kept Dandenong goalless in the second quarter, to hold a 30-point lead early in the third quarter. Dandenong scored the next five goals to reduce the margin, and took a 5-point lead into three quarter time.

The final quarter is remembered for key events which swung the game in Dandenong's favour when scores were close late in the game: after 15 minutes of play, Werribee's Phil O'Keeffe was ordered off the ground for assaulting Dandenong's Ian Atkinson, resulting in a five-minute delay while Atkinson was stretchered from the ground, and a resulting free kick to Dandenong from which it scored a goal which put it six points in front – Atkinson's jaw was broken in three places, and O'Keeffe was suspended for six weeks for the assault. Werribee regained a one-point lead after 22 minutes from a Nick Walsh free kick, and Rohan Welsh regained the five-point lead for Dandenong a minute later. Werribee attacked over the next few minutes, and missed two short-range snap shots – the first by Stephen Sells, and the second a shot by Werribee captain-coach Leon Harris which was touched on the line in a diving save by Dandenong captain-coach Tony Elshaug – to reduce the margin to three points after 26 minutes. Werribee continued to attack over the following two minutes, before Dandenong rebounded and Sean Millane kicked the sealing goal in the 29th minute.

1991 VFA Grand Final
Sunday, 22 September	Werribee	def. by	Dandenong	Princes Park (crowd: 13,565)
3.4 (22); 8.6 (54); 11.8 (74); 14.12 (96)	Q1; Q2; Q3; Final	4.0 (24); 4.6 (30); 11.13 (79); 15.15 (105)	Umpires: Peter Carey, Geoff Morrow; Norm Goss Memorial Medal: Brad Gotch (Dandenong)
Drum 2, Eames 2, Morgan 2, Sells 2, Harris, Knight, Lesiputty, Normington O'Keeffe, Walsh	Goals	Gotch 4, Welsh 4, Millane 2, Atkinson, Doyle, Elshaug, MacKenzie, Wicks
Injuries	Atkinson (jaw), Welsh (concussion)
O'Keeffe, for assaulting Atkinson in the fourth quarter (ordered off)	Reports	Green, for striking Raeburn in the second quarter

== Awards ==
- The leading goalkicker for the home-and-away season was Frank Rugolo (Sandringham), who kicked 78 goals and did not participate in finals. For the whole season including finals, the leading goalkicker was Rohan Welsh (Dandenong), who kicked 69 goals in the home-and-away season and 84 goals overall.
- The J. J. Liston Trophy was won by Anthony Eames (Werribee), who polled 22 votes. Eames finished ahead of Robert Bolzon (Prahran), who was second with 21 votes, and Joe Rugolo (Sandringham) and Simon Dalrymple (Box Hill), who were equal third with 14 votes.
- The Fothergill–Round Medal was won by Ron De Iulio (Box Hill).
- Prahran won the seconds premiership. Prahran 11.16 (82) defeated Coburg 10.12 (72) in the grand final, held as a curtain-raiser to the Seniors Grand Final on 22 September.

== Notable events ==
- In the second semi-final, Werribee recorded its first ever finals win in either division since joining the Association in 1965, after having lost all seven of the previous finals it had contested. Even so, the win was unconvincing, winning by twelve points despite recording thirteen fewer scoring shots.
