= Manager (association football) =

Head coach of an association football team

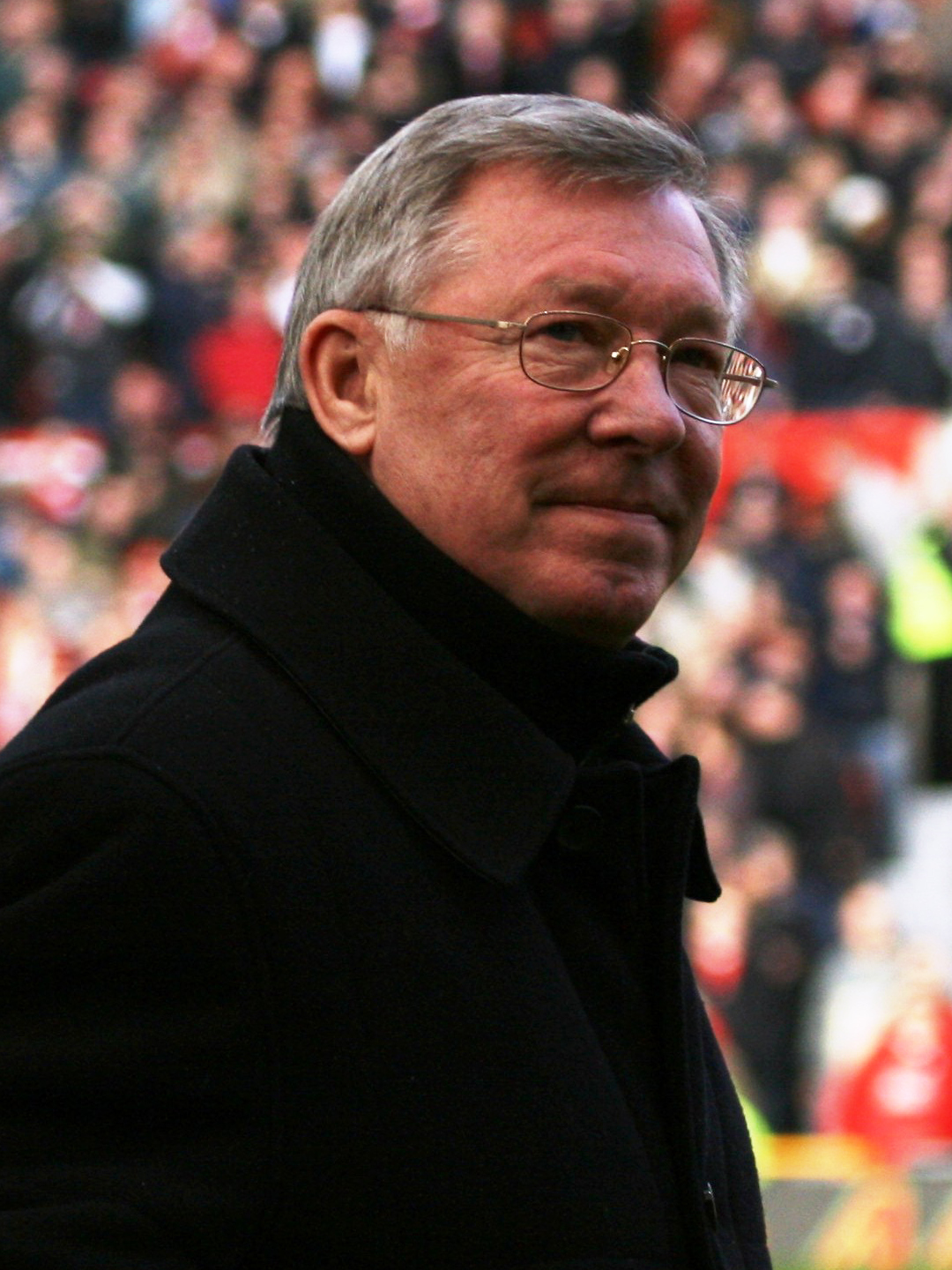
Alex Ferguson is the winner of the most English Manager of the Year awards, all won during his tenure as manager of Manchester United. He is the UEFA coaching ambassador.

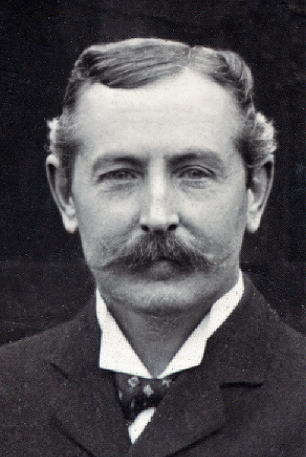
George Ramsay has been described as the world's first football manager. He managed Aston Villa from 1886 to 1926, during which time he established Villa as the most successful club in England.

In association football, the manager is the person who has overall responsibility for the running of a football team. They have wide-ranging responsibilities, including selecting the team, choosing the tactics, recruiting and transferring players, negotiating player contracts, and speaking to the media. In professional football, a manager is usually appointed by and answerable to the club's board of directors, but at an amateur level the manager may have total responsibility for the running of a club.

== Responsibilities ==
The manager's responsibilities in a professional football club usually include (but are not limited to) the following:

- Selecting the team of players for matches, and their formation.
- Planning the strategy, and instructing the players on the pitch.
- Motivating players before and during a match.
- Delegating duties to the first team coach and the coaching and medical staff.
- Scouting for young but talented players for eventual training in the youth academy or the reserves, and encouraging their development and improvement.
- Buying and selling players in the transfer market, including loans.
- Facing the media in pre-match and post-match interviews.

Some of the above responsibilities may be shared with a director of football or sporting director, and are at times delegated to an assistant manager or club coach.

Additionally, depending on the club, some minor responsibilities include:

- Marketing the club, most especially for ticket admission, sponsorship and merchandising.
- Growing turnover and keeping the club profitable.

These responsibilities are more common among managers of small clubs.

== See also ==
- Head coach
- List of football managers with most games
- List of longest managerial reigns in association football
- Caretaker manager
- Player-manager
- League Managers Association, for managers in England
- Football Manager, a simulation video game for playing as a manager
