= Student assistant =

Student assistant may mean:

- A student member of a college coaching staff
- A student teaching assistant
- Resident assistant, a trained peer leader, within a college, university, or group housing facility
