= Bolzon =

Bolzon is a surname. Notable people with the surname include:

- Nereo Bolzon (born 1960), Canadian football player
- Robert Bolzon (born 1967), Australian rules footballer
