= Rohan Welsh =

Australian rules footballer (born 1970)

- Welsh in May 2024

Personal information
- Full name: Rohan Welsh
- Nickname: Woosher
- Born: 7 October 1970 (age 56)
- Original team: St Bernard's College
- Height: 189 cm (6 ft 2 in)
- Weight: 94 kg (207 lb)
- Position: Forward

Playing career
Years	Club	Games (Goals)
1992–97	Carlton	42 (59)

Coaching career^{3}
Years	Club	Games (W–L–D)
2013–2014	Casey	38 (17–21–0)
2024–2025	Northern Bullants	35 (4–31–0)
2026–	Banyule	18 (9–9–0)
- ^{3} Coaching statistics correct as of the 2026 season.

Career highlights
- TAC Cup premiership coach: 2006; VFA premiership player: 1991; VFA Leading Goalkicker Medal: 1991

Rohan Welsh (born 7 October 1970) is an Australian rules football coach and former player who currently serves as the senior coach of the Banyule Football Club in the Northern Football Netball League (NFNL).

Welsh played for Carlton in the Australian Football League (AFL) and Dandenong and Frankston in the Victorian Football Association/League (VFL/VFL). He was the VFA's leading goalkicker in 1991 and a member of Dandenong's final premiership team.

== Playing career ==
Welsh was recruited to the Australian Football League (AFL) by the Essendon Football Club with the 54th pick in the 1990 pre-season draft. Despite playing for the club in the under-19s and reserves competitions, he was unable to break into the senior side and was released in 1990.

After leaving Essendon, Welsh moved to the Dandenong Football Club in the Victorian Football Association (VFA) – later renamed to the Victorian Football League (VFL) – where he had success as a full-forward. He kicked 84 goals during the 1991 season (including 15 during the finals series) to win the VFA Leading Goalkicker Medal. Welsh was a member of Dandenong's premiership-winning team against Werribee in the 1991 grand final (which was also the club's final premiership), where he kicked four goals despite suffering a concussion in the third quarter and not remembering much of the second half.

After his success in the VFA, Welsh was recruited back to the AFL by Carlton for the 1992 season. As one of Carlton's forward targets, he kicked 28 goals during the year, including six against Fitzroy in round 14, earning him the club's Best First Year Player Award. He played as a forward pocket in the 1993 AFL Grand Final, where Carlton lost to Essendon by 44 points.

In an end of season trip, Welsh badly injured his knee after falling off a fence during a night of celebrating. He did not play a senior match for two years but remained on Carlton's list, eventually making his return in 1996. He was delisted by Carlton at the conclusion of the 1997 AFL season and returned to the VFA/VFL to play with Frankston until his retirement in 2000.

== Coaching career ==
Following his playing retirement, Welsh turned to coaching and served as an assistant coach with the Calder Cannons in the under-18s TAC Cup competition from 2002 until 2004. He moved to the Oakleigh Chargers in 2005 as the team's head coach, winning the TAC Cup grand final against Calder in 2006.

In 2008, AFL Victoria appointed Welsh as the head coach of the Vic Metro under-18s academy. He returned to the VFL in 2013 to serve as the senior coach of the Casey Scorpions for two seasons. Welsh moved to the St Kilda Football Club in 2015, serving as a backline coach until the end of the 2017 season and as a forwards coach in 2018.

=== Northern Bullants ===
Welsh addressing Northern Bullants players during a match against in May 2025

Welsh joined the Northern Bullants in the VFL as the club's head coach in 2024, replacing Brodie Holland. After recording two wins during the 2024 season, he re-signed as coach for the 2025, marking the first time since the Bullants became a standalone club in 2021 that it had retained a head coach for more than one season.

The Bullants' 2025 season was affected by multiple off-field controversies. In February 2025, the club expressed interest in signing former AFL player Tarryn Thomas, who had been serving an 18-match suspension from playing at any level of football after he was found to have engaged in inappropriate behaviour towards a woman. Welsh said he "wouldn't mind sitting down and having a chat with [Thomas]" but added that "we need to be aware that he's a good person". Following negative public reaction to the possible signing, along with the threat of losing sponsors, the Bullants board met and decided against Thomas joining. It was reported that Welsh was "considering his future" as head coach after the board's decision, but he ultimately remained with the club for the rest of the season.

Welsh was unable to coach the Bullants in round 1 because he had been hospitalised with a severe foot infection, with assistant coach Rocky Iannello taking over for the match. In April 2025, the Herald Sun reported that Welsh had been temporarily stood down as head coach after an "alleged verbal clash" with then-Bullants vice-president Vas Nikolovski at a Northern Football Netball League (NFNL) match. Welsh denied any wrongdoing and continued to serve as coach, although he was absent from one training session.

The Bullants continued to struggle on-field, winning two matches and claiming the wooden spoon for the second year in a row. On 6 October 2025, the VFL revoked the club's licence, citing "on-field competitiveness and off-field financial liability over a number of years" as factors in the decision. The club entered voluntary liquidation two months later.

=== Banyule ===
After leaving the Bullants, Welsh joined the Banyule Football Club in the Northern Football Netball League (NFNL) to serve as the club's senior men's coach. He was joined by former Bullants players Liam Mackie (the club's final captain) and Jean-Luc Velissaris (the club's three-time best-and-fairest winner). Despite ending the 2026 season with six consecutive wins, Banyule finished sixth on the ladder and narrowly missed out on the Division 1 finals series.

== Statistics ==
=== Coaching statistics ===
Legend
W	Wins	L	Losses	D	Draws	W%	Winning percentage	LP	Ladder position	LT	League teams

Season	Team	League	Games	W	L	D	W %	Ladder
2013	Casey	VFL	20	12	8	0	60.0%	6 / 14
2014	Casey	VFL	18	5	13	0	27.8%	15 / 16
2024	Northern Bullants	VFL	18	2	16	0	11.1%	21 / 21
2025	Northern Bullants	VFL	17	2	15	0	11.8%	21 / 21
2026	Banyule	NFNL	18	9	9	0	50.0%	6 / 10
2027	Banyule	NFNL						
