= Maurie Lyon =

Australian rules footballer

Personal information
- Full name: Maurice James Lyon
- Born: 16 January 1931
- Died: 16 December 2014 (aged 83)
- Original team: Lakeside Rovers
- Height: 179 cm (5 ft 10 in)
- Weight: 80 kg (176 lb)

Playing career^{1}
Years	Club	Games (Goals)
1953	South Melbourne	4 (0)
- ^{1} Playing statistics correct to the end of 1953.

Maurice James Lyon (16 January 1931 – 16 December 2014) was an Australian rules footballer who played with South Melbourne in the Victorian Football League (VFL).

His son, Ross played football for Fitzroy and Brisbane Bears and coached St Kilda and Fremantle.
