= Sporting director =

Management role in sports clubs

A sporting director, or director of sport, is an executive management position in a sports club. The role is well known as a management role for European football clubs, which are sometime also "sports clubs", offering many types of sports. The sporting director is, in many cases, a member of the executive board and therefore an executive director. The sporting director is usually directly subordinate to the chief executive officer or the chairman of the sports organisation. The sporting director is in turn typically the manager of the coaching staff.

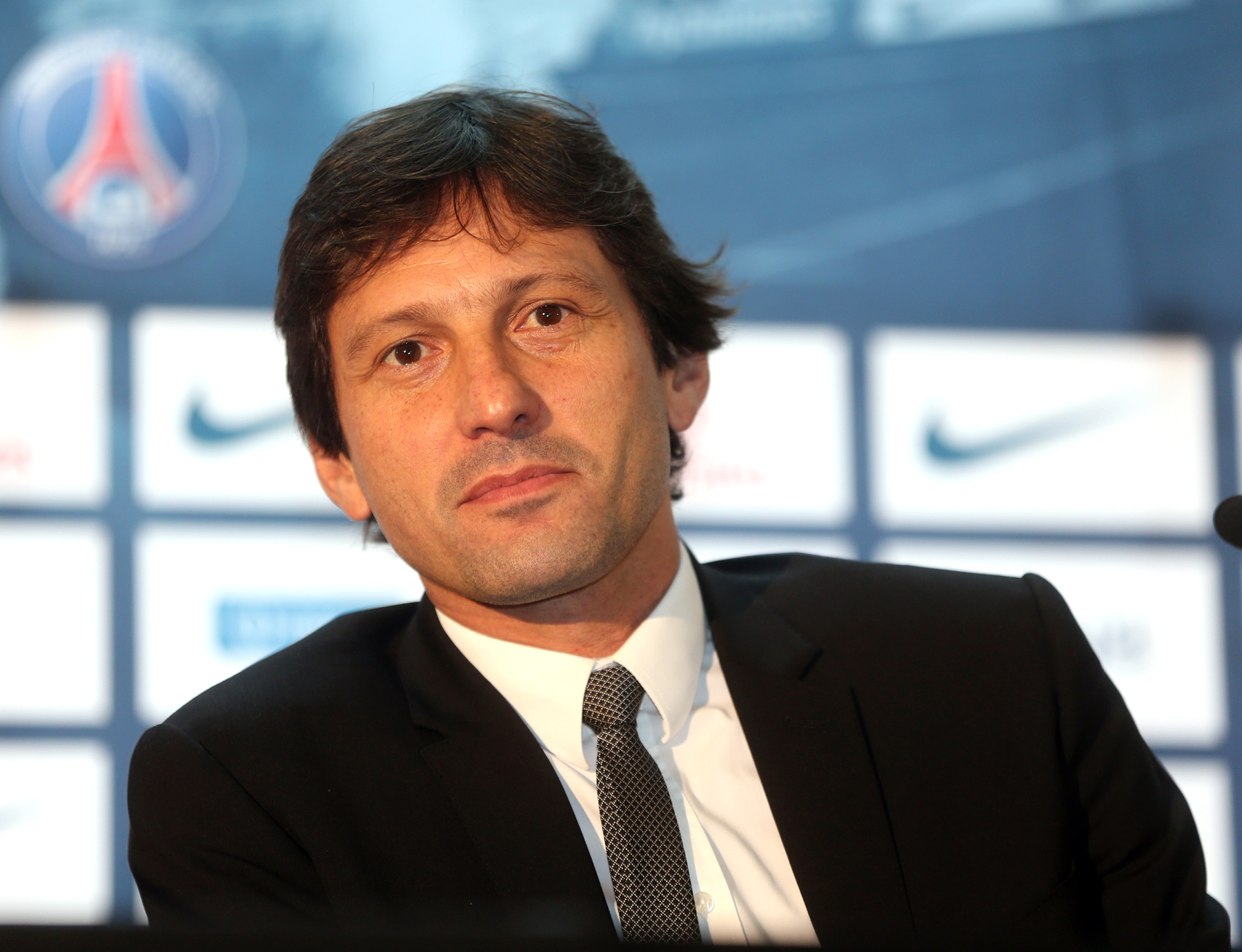
Leonardo Araújo, former sporting director of Paris Saint-Germain

== Director of football ==
A director of football or director of soccer, sometimes also called a sporting director or technical director, is a senior management figure at an association football club, most commonly in Europe. Often, their key task is managing transfers of players to and from the team; however, the nature of the position varies, and their role at a particular club may be more specialised.
