= Ross Lyon =

Australian rules footballer and coach (born 1966)

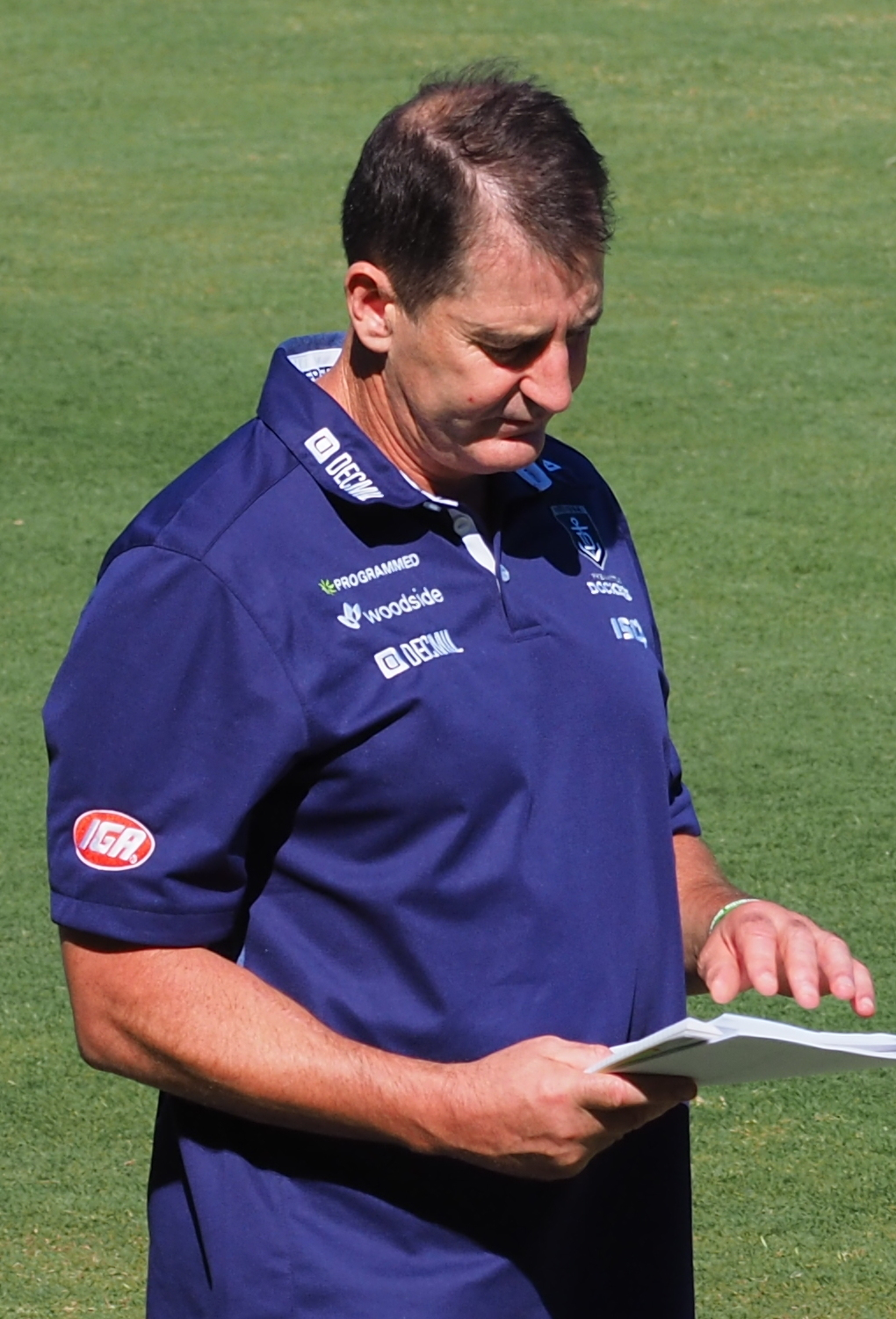
- Lyon in March 2016

Personal information
- Full name: Ross Lyon
- Born: 8 November 1966 (age 59)
- Original team: Reservoir (NFL)
- Height: 183 cm (6 ft 0 in)
- Weight: 89 kg (196 lb)

Playing career^{1}
Years	Club	Games (Goals)
1985–1994	Fitzroy	127 (112)
1995	Brisbane Bears	2 (0)
Total		129 (112)

Coaching career^{3}
Years	Club	Games (W–L–D)
2007–2011	St Kilda	121 (76–41–4)
2012–2019	Fremantle	184 (96–87–1)
2023–	St Kilda	93 (43–50–0)
Total		398 (215–178–5)
- ^{1} Playing statistics correct to the end of 1995.^{3} Coaching statistics correct as of the 2026 season.

Career highlights
- AFL Coaches Association Coach of the Year 2009

Ross Lyon (born 8 November 1966) is a former Australian rules football player and the current senior coach of the St Kilda Football Club in the Australian Football League (AFL). He previously coached St Kilda from 2007 to 2011 and the Fremantle Football Club from 2012 to 2019. He played for Fitzroy and the Brisbane Bears from 1985 to 1995.

Lyon holds the all-time AFL/VFL record of most games coached without a premiership with 398.

== Playing career ==
=== Fitzroy ===
Lyon began his career with Fitzroy in 1985. After playing the last five games of the season and the first game in 1986 he missed the remainder of the season and most of 1987 due to groin and back injuries that was later diagnosed as spondylolisthesis. He returned to play 19 games in 1988 and ended up playing 127 games over the next ten years until the end of the 1994 season.

Lyon played for Fitzroy from 1985 until 1994 for a total of 127 games and kicked 112 goals.

=== Brisbane Bears ===
Lyon played two games with the Brisbane Bears in 1995 before retiring due to a knee problem. As a player, he battled injury but was known for his fearless approach to the game, particularly his strong tackling and bumping.

== Coaching career ==
=== Richmond Football Club assistant coach: 1996–1999 ===
After retiring as a player, Lyon began his coaching career as an assistant coach under senior coach Robert Walls at Richmond in 1996. Lyon was also assistant coach under senior coach Jeff Gieschen.

=== Carlton Football Club assistant coach: 2000–2003 ===
Lyon moved to Carlton in 2000. He spent three years at Carlton both as an assistant coach and as the club's VFL coach where he worked under senior coaches David Parkin, Wayne Brittain and Denis Pagan.

=== Sydney Swans assistant coach: 2004–2006 ===
In 2004, Lyon joined the Sydney Swans in an assistant coaching position as midfield coach, working under senior coach Paul Roos his former Fitzroy teammate. He was instrumental in helping the Swans reach consecutive grand finals in 2005 and 2006, triumphing in the former year.

=== St Kilda Football Club: 2007–2011 ===
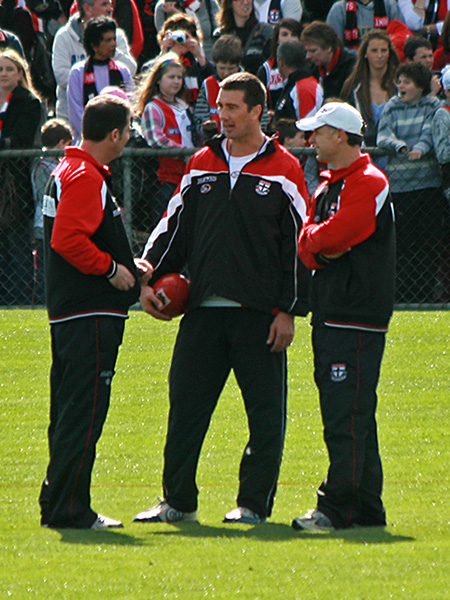
Lyon (left) with St Kilda assistant coaches Stephen Silvagni and Tony Elshaug

When the St Kilda senior coaching position became available at the end of 2006, a list of candidates was drawn up. Lyon beat 52 candidates for the job, including favourite John Longmire. He succeeded Grant Thomas as St Kilda's senior coach who had been sacked a week after the Saints were defeated in an elimination final by Melbourne in the 2006 finals series.

Upon becoming senior coach of the club, Lyon hired his own assistants, with close friend and AFL Team of the Century fullback Stephen Silvagni, Anthony Rock, former Carlton assistant coach Tony Elshaug and John Barker all being appointed in assistant coaching positions for Lyon's first season. He also helped lure highly rated fitness coach David Misson to the club from Sydney. Silvagni spent four years at the club as defensive coach, leaving at the end of 2010 to work with Greater Western Sydney, while Elshaug became head of recruiting. Other notable assistants to have worked with Lyon in his time as coach include Leigh Tudor and Robert Harvey.

Lyon is the most successful St Kilda coach by percentage of games won, with a 64.5% winning record.

==== 2007 season ====
Lyon began his first season as senior coach with a victory against Melbourne in Round 1 of 2007 and the Saints then won four of their first seven games. Injuries hit the club badly in Round 8, however, with St Kilda having only 24 out of a possible 38 players to choose from against Hawthorn. Lyon was criticised for flooding excessively and many became angry with the more defensive style of St Kilda over the subsequent weeks.

After an upset victory in Robert Harvey's 350th match in Round 12 against West Coast, Lyon proceeded to guide the Saints to win three out of the next four matches and a drawn game against the Western Bulldogs. This left the Saints in eighth position on the ladder, a spot the side was unable to maintain after narrow losses to reigning grand-finalists Sydney and West Coast in the remaining five rounds . The team narrowly missed playing finals for the fourth consecutive season, finishing 9th with 11 wins, 10 losses and 1 draw for the year. Despite missing the finals, the Saints finished the year strongly, winning 7.5 of the last 11 matches.

During the 2007 trade period, St Kilda were widely considered to have traded very well, picking up Geelong premiership ruckman Steven King, Geelong forward Charlie Gardiner and Swans pair Adam Schneider and Sean Dempster for draft selections 26 and 90.

==== 2008 season ====
St Kilda started the season strongly by winning the 2008 NAB Cup, defeating the Adelaide Crows by five points at Football Park. Despite this strong showing the Saints went on to have a mixed first half of the season with five wins and six losses. In the second half of the season, their fortunes improved sealing a spot in the top four with a record-breaking 108-point victory against Essendon in the final round.

The 2008 finals campaign, Lyon's first as coach, saw St Kilda lose to Geelong in the first qualifying final and then defeat Collingwood by 34 points in a semi-final. In what would be veteran and club legend Robert Harvey's final game as a player, the Saints were well beaten by eventual premiers Hawthorn in a preliminary final, losing by 54 points.

==== 2009 season ====
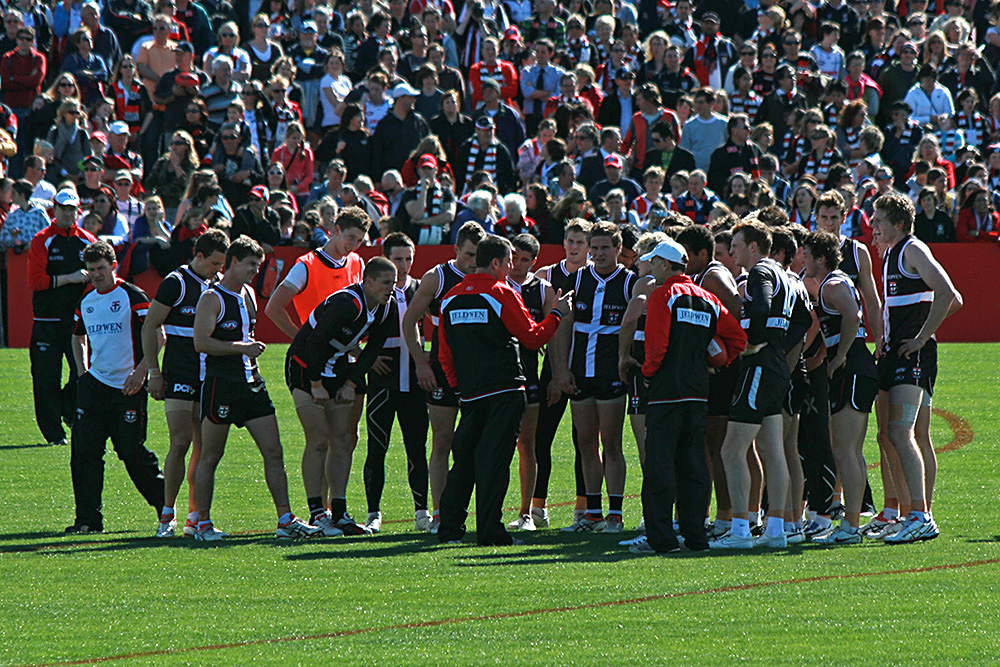
Lyon addresses the Saints team at training prior to the 2009 AFL Grand Final

St Kilda made a number of changes to their coaching and playing staff in the 2008/09 pre-season, adding Geelong assistant coach Leigh Tudor as the forward coach. Over the pre-season Lyon worked on a new game plan based around forward pressure, midfield zone defence and pushing numbers behind the ball. This was the platform for a record-breaking year. St Kilda won 19 consecutive matches, including a game described by some observers as one of the best home-and-away clashes of all time in Round 14 against Geelong, which was also undefeated at the time. Despite losing narrowly to Essendon and North Melbourne late in the season, the Saints finished two-games clear on top of the AFL ladder, winning the McLelland Trophy for the first time since 1997.

The club won its first final against Collingwood before beating the Western Bulldogs by seven points in the preliminary finals to advance to their first AFL Grand Final since 1997. Lyon became only the third coach (after Stan Alves and Allan Jeans) to lead the club to a grand final since World War Two.

The 2009 AFL Grand Final was one of the closest and hardest-fought ever held. A record-breaking 214 tackles were laid in the match (118 by the Saints). St Kilda led the game at every quarter but fell short at the final siren, losing the match by 12 points. Several St Kilda players missed short range shots on goal and the team had three more scoring shots than Geelong for the match. Four of St Kilda's scoring shots were rushed behinds; Geelong had none.

Despite the grand final loss, Lyon was named the AFL Coaches Association Coach of the Year in 2009.

==== 2010 season ====
Controversy plagued the St Kilda Football Club in the 2009/2010 pre-season. Former captain Luke Ball signed with rival club Collingwood and Lyon was criticised for failing to keep Ball and not gaining any compensation in return. The Saints chose to trade their first round draft pick for former Essendon footballer Andrew Lovett. It was hoped that Lovett's pace and skill would enable the Saints to win the premiership in 2010. Lovett never played a game for the club, being sacked after allegations of rape were made against him.

Despite the controversy, the Saints managed to win 15.5 games in 2010 and finished third on the AFL ladder. The season was notable for the loss of club captain Nick Riewoldt to a serious injury in Round 3. Riewoldt did not return for four months but managed to come back into the team and lead them into another finals series.

The Saints beat Geelong narrowly in the qualifying finals and then comfortably won a preliminary final against the Western Bulldogs for the second year in a row. Lyon became the only coach apart from Allan Jeans to lead St Kilda to multiple grand final appearances. The 2010 AFL Grand Final against Collingwood ended in a draw, with St Kilda coming from 24 points down at half-time to square the result at the final siren. The replay the following week saw the Saints beaten comfortably with the club finishing runner-up for the second year in a row.

==== 2011 season ====
St Kilda had their worst start to a season in almost a decade, only winning one and drawing one of their first seven matches. St Kilda then started their revival, defeating Melbourne in Round 9 and then only losing three more games for the remainder of the year. They also inflicted West Coast's only loss in the second half of the season when both clubs were on a winning roll. St Kilda finished seventh at the end of the season, following an elimination final loss to Sydney.

=== Departure from St Kilda and move to Fremantle ===
On 15 September 2011, shortly after St Kilda's elimination from the 2011 finals series, Lyon suddenly walked out and resigned as senior coach of St Kilda and then suddenly signed a four-year deal to become the senior coach of Fremantle Football Club, leaving Fremantle senior coach Mark Harvey abruptly and unexpectedly sacked. Both Lyon and Harvey had one year remaining on their respective contracts, with Lyon exercising a get-out clause and Fremantle paying out Harvey's final year. It emerged that Fremantle had head-hunted Lyon to take over after both coaches' existing contracts had expired at the end of 2012, but that when it was discovered that Lyon had a get-out clause, the possibility of an immediate move was discussed.

The coaching change was a surprise throughout the football world, as there had been no media speculation or reporting on any potential change prior to it occurring. As Lyon and Harvey were both managed by the same company, Elite Sport Properties, Lyon carried out the negotiations without his management's knowledge; in fact, his management had been actively negotiating a contract extension with St Kilda at the same time. The aftermath of the decision saw hurt feelings at St Kilda and for Mark Harvey, as neither knew anything about the deal until it was done. There was a backlash from many in the football world about the way the deal was done and particularly about the manner in which Harvey was treated by Fremantle.

Lyon left St Kilda with the best winning percentage of any other Saints coach in the club's history and became the first person to coach the Saints to four consecutive finals series. Lyon was then replaced by Scott Watters as St Kilda's senior coach.

=== Fremantle Football Club: 2012–2019 ===
After starting the 2012 season strongly with a 5–2 win–loss record, including wins against reigning premiers Geelong and Lyon's former club St Kilda, Fremantle struggled in the middle parts of the season, highlighted by big losses to Hawthorn and cross-town rival West Coast. As the season progressed the Dockers seemed to start coming to grips with Lyon's game plan. From Rounds 15 to 19 the Dockers went on a five-game winning streak, with the most notable win being a 65-point win over West Coast. The Dockers finished seventh in the regular season and defeated Geelong in their elimination final match to advance to the semi-finals, where they subsequently lost to Adelaide.

The Dockers improved again under Lyon's tutelage the following year, finishing the 2013 season in the top four for just the second time in their history. An upset win against Geelong at Simonds Stadium and a 25-point win against Sydney in the club's first home preliminary final booked them a place in the grand final, also a club first. The Dockers under Lyon lost to Hawthorn in the 2013 AFL Grand Final by a margin of 15 points, with the final score Hawthorn 11.11 (77) to Fremantle 8.14 (62). Another top-four finish followed in 2014, however losses to Sydney and Port Adelaide sent the club out of the finals in straight sets.

Lyon coached his 200th AFL game in Round 6, 2015.

Lyon coached Fremantle to its first minor premiership in 2015, after winning 12 of the first 13 games of the season. Fremantle defeated Sydney in their qualifying final, earning a home preliminary final, the first time ever both preliminary finals had been held in the same state excluding Victoria. Fremantle were defeated by Hawthorn by 27 points. After this defeat, Lyon's game plan came under heavy criticism as he had coached four grand finals for only one draw and five preliminary finals for only three wins.

After failing to lead Fremantle into the AFL finals series in four consecutive seasons, Lyon was sacked as senior coach of Fremantle on 20 August 2019, after the Dockers' Round 22 defeat to visiting Essendon. Lyon was then replaced by assistant coach David Hale as caretaker senior coach for the final game of the 2019 season.

=== Return to St Kilda: 2023– ===
In October 2022, following a disappointing end to the 2022 AFL season, St Kilda sacked incumbent senior coach Brett Ratten and immediately made overtures to Lyon about a possible return. Lyon's return to St Kilda was confirmed with his appointment as senior coach on 24 October for a second stint to a four-year deal.

In Lyon's first year in his second stint as Saints senior coach, he coached them to wins in their first four matches of the 2023 AFL season, marking the first time they had started a season so impressively since 2010. Having remained in the top eight all season, the Saints under Lyon finished the 2023 season in sixth place on the ladder with the best defence in the competition, conceding an average of only 71.6 points per match, but with the fourth-worst attack (and worst of any of the top eight sides), scoring an average of only 77.2 points. Contesting its first final in Melbourne since 2011, the Saints under Lyon were eliminated with a 24-point elimination final loss to Greater Western Sydney at the Melbourne Cricket Ground.

=== Coaching style ===
At both St Kilda and Fremantle, Lyon was noted for enacting the most structured and defensive game plans in the league, with a particularly strong emphasis on the entire team applying defensive pressure when the opponent has the ball. Throughout his career, his teams have regularly been amongst the best in the league for points conceded, if not the best – in 2009, when St Kilda won the minor premiership, they conceded only 1,411 points in the home-and-away season, 367 points fewer than the next best – and have consequently performed well even when their points scored has been closer to the league average. Despite its success, Lyon's game plan is not universally liked; many observers have criticised it as being "boring" or "ugly" compared with higher-scoring open game styles employed by some other teams, or by teams from previous eras. Lyon has also been criticised, including by former St Kilda coach Scott Watters, for sticking to his game plan at the expense of having an effective forward structure.

== Honours and achievements ==
Coaching honours Team

- McClelland Trophy/AFL minor premiership (St Kilda) 2009 (Fremantle) 2015
- AFL Grand Final coach: (St Kilda) 2009, 2010, 2010 replay (Fremantle) 2013
- NAB Cup (St Kilda) 2008

Individual

- Allan Jeans Senior Coach of the Year Award 2009

== Statistics ==
=== Playing statistics ===
Legend
G	Goals	K	Kicks	D	Disposals	T	Tackles
B	Behinds	H	Handballs	M	Marks

Season	Team	No.	Games	Totals							Averages (per game)						
Season	Team	No.	Games	G	B	K	H	D	M	T	G	B	K	H	D	M	T
1985	Fitzroy	29	5	9	9	57	37	94	29	—N/a	1.8	1.8	11.4	7.4	18.8	5.8	—N/a
1986	Fitzroy	29	1	1	2	8	5	13	2	—N/a	1.0	2.0	8.0	5.0	13.0	2.0	—N/a
1987	Fitzroy	29	2	3	1	9	5	14	0	2	1.5	0.5	4.5	2.5	7.0	0.0	1.0
1988	Fitzroy	29	19	16	13	168	141	309	65	23	0.8	0.7	8.8	7.4	16.3	3.4	1.2
1989	Fitzroy	29	14	13	17	149	51	200	61	13	0.9	1.2	10.6	3.6	14.3	4.4	0.9
1990	Fitzroy	29	17	15	14	168	112	280	59	15	0.9	0.8	9.9	6.6	16.5	3.5	0.9
1991	Fitzroy	29	19	15	12	167	157	324	55	21	0.8	0.6	8.8	8.3	17.1	2.9	1.1
1992	Fitzroy	29	17	12	10	191	139	330	60	31	0.7	0.6	11.2	8.2	19.4	3.5	1.8
1993	Fitzroy	29	15	16	10	117	72	189	53	26	1.1	0.7	7.8	4.8	12.6	3.5	1.7
1994	Fitzroy	29	18	12	5	168	143	311	64	42	0.7	0.3	9.3	7.9	17.3	3.6	2.3
1995	Brisbane Bears	28	2	0	0	17	17	34	6	4	0.0	0.0	8.5	8.5	17.0	3.0	2.0
Career totals			129	112	93	1219	879	2098	454	177	0.9	0.7	9.4	6.8	16.3	3.5	1.4

=== Coaching statistics ===
Statistics are correct as at the end of the 2026 season

Legend
W	Wins	L	Losses	D	Draws	W%	Winning percentage	LP	Ladder position	LT	League teams

Season	Team	Games	W	L	D	W %	LP	LT
2007	St Kilda	22	11	10	1	52.3%	9	16
2008	St Kilda	25	14	11	0	56.0%	4	16
2009	St Kilda	25	22	3	0	88.0%	1	16
2010	St Kilda	26	17	7	2	69.2%	3	16
2011	St Kilda	23	12	10	1	54.3%	6	17
2012	Fremantle	24	15	9	0	62.5%	7	18
2013	Fremantle	25	18	6	1	74.0%	3	18
2014	Fremantle	24	16	8	0	66.7%	4	18
2015	Fremantle	24	18	6	0	75.0%	1	18
2016	Fremantle	22	4	18	0	18.2%	16	18
2017	Fremantle	22	8	14	0	36.4%	14	18
2018	Fremantle	22	8	14	0	36.4%	14	18
2019^{1}	Fremantle	21	9	12	0	42.9%	13	18
2023	St Kilda	23	13	10	0	56.5%	6	18
2024	St Kilda	23	11	12	0	47.8%	12	18
2025	St Kilda	23	9	14	0	39.1%	12	18
2026	St Kilda	23	10	13	0	43.5%	11	18
Career totals		398	215	178	5	54.7%		

^{1} Lyon was sacked from Fremantle after the Round 22, 2019 loss to Essendon.

== Personal life ==
Lyon grew up in the northern Melbourne suburb of Reservoir with his four sisters and parents Maurie and Louise Lyon. He attended Lakeside High School and in 1984 was selected to tour Ireland with the Australian schoolboys team. His father played four games for South Melbourne in the 1953 VFL season.

After retiring from playing football he married Kirsten Woods, sister of former footballer Tony Woods. They have two daughters and a son.

=== Sexual harassment allegations ===
In 2018, Lyon faced allegations of sexual harassment from a former junior staffer. The incident occurred at a club Christmas function, where Lyon commented on the woman's attire. Reportedly telling the woman, who was pregnant at the time, that he liked her “budding boobs” before pursuing her throughout the function. Despite an internal investigation that cleared him, the woman felt harassed, humiliated and intimidated by unidentified Fremantle football club staff, leading to her resignation. After a second complaint and investigations involving WorkSafe and the AFL integrity unit, a settlement was reached. The woman reportedly received a six-figure sum as part of a deal which included a non-disclosure agreement.
