= Nick Walsh (footballer) =

Australian rules footballer

Personal information
- Full name: Nicholas Walsh
- Born: 7 January 1965 (age 61); Geelong
- Original team: St Peters (GFL)
- Height: 185 cm (6 ft 1 in)
- Weight: 78 kg (172 lb)
- Position: Forward

Playing career^{1}
Years	Club	Games (Goals)
1986–1988	Essendon	11 (1)
- ^{1} Playing statistics correct to the end of 1988.

Nick Walsh (born 7 January 1965) is a former Australian rules footballer who played with Essendon in the Victorian Football League (VFL).

Walsh, a half-forward flanker, started out at St Peters in the Geelong Football League. He won the club's best and fairest award in 1985. The following year he did pre-season training with Geelong but didn't earn a place on their senior list. He instead played reserves football with Essendon in 1986 and after five games in the two’s was called up into the seniors for the final round of the 1986 fixture against St Kilda at Moorabbin Oval. In Essendon's Panasonic Cup semi-final win over the West Coast Eagles in 1987, Walsh kicked eight goals 6 points which is still a club record for a night series game. He subsequently got more opportunities in 1987, playing eight games. His other two league appearances for Essendon came in 1988.

He departed Essendon for Victorian Football Association club Werribee after the 1988 season, and played there for five seasons from 1989 to 1993, playing a total of 65 games and kicking 52 goals. He was part of the club's losing 1991 Grand Final team, and missed its 1993 premiership team with a hamstring injury. He then returned to the merged successor to his GFL junior club – Geelong West/St Peters – for three seasons before retiring from football.
