= Phil O'Keeffe =

Australian rules footballer

Personal information
- Full name: Phillip O'Keeffe
- Born: 17 December 1966 (age 59)
- Original teams: East Ballarat, (Ballarat FL)

Playing career^{1}
Years	Club	Games (Goals)
1989	Footscray	9 (19)
- ^{1} Playing statistics correct to the end of 1989.

Disambiguation: the geographer Phil O'Keefe

Phillip O'Keeffe (born 17 December 1966) is a former Australian rules footballer who played for Footscray in the Victorian Football League (VFL) in 1989. He was recruited from the East Ballarat Football Club in the Ballarat Football League.

O'Keeffe later played for Werribee in the Victorian Football Association. He was ordered off in the final quarter of the 1991 Grand Final, after assaulting Dandenong's Ian Atkinson, leaving him with a severely broken jaw; it was considered one of the turning points of the Grand Final, which Werribee lost by nine points. He later played for Williamstown.
