= Coaching staff =

Sports team staff

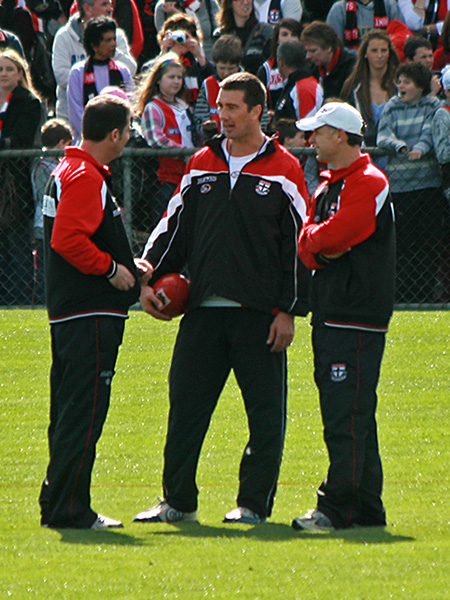
Coaching staff of the St Kilda Football Club in the Australian Football League discuss tactics prior to the 2009 AFL Grand Final. From left Senior Coach Ross Lyon, and Assistant Coaches Stephen Silvagni and Tony Elshaug

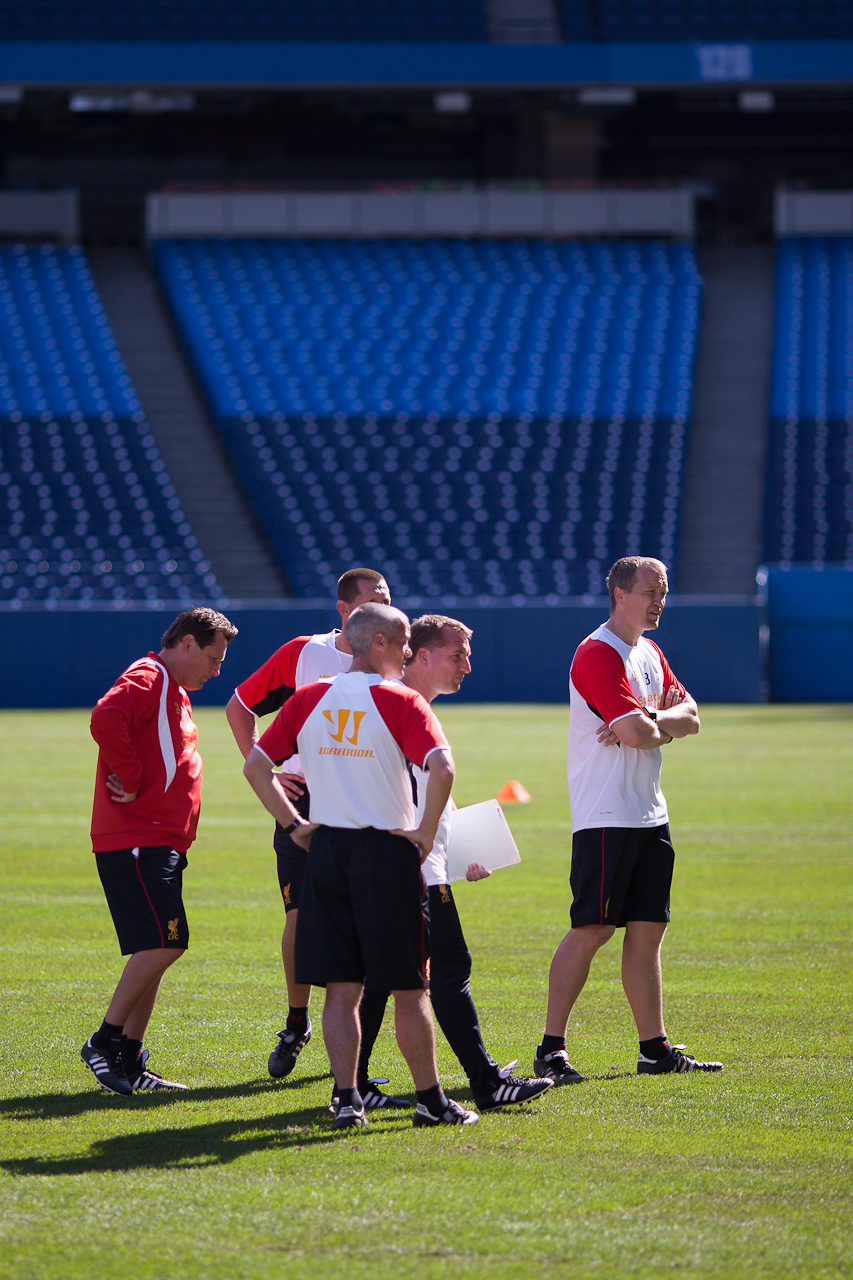
The coaching team of the Liverpool Football Club monitoring players during a training session.

The coaching staff is a group of non-athletes tied to a sports team. A coaching staff can be existent at all levels of athletics. It is led by a head coach (known as a manager or senior coach in some sports) and consists of one or more assistant coaches, physicians, massage therapists, athletic trainers, equipment managers, nutritionists and others, which are all required to pass training courses for reliability.

It has been suggested that when there is an upbeat and positive coaching staff with healthy relationships with the athletes, the outcome, and experience of the team as a whole will benefit overall. Although college athletes have the final say where they will be pursuing their academic and athletic careers, coaching staffs and facilities are more often than not are a deciding factor.

In association football the coaching staff usually consists of coaching personal which are head coach (or manager), assistants to head coach (or assistant manager), fitness coach, goalkeeper coach, coach-analyst, other coaches. In addition to the coaching staff, an association football team also have supporting departments such as a medical team which consists of physician, massage therapist, nutritionist, others; a scouting department; an office administration. There are also some additional roles available depending on the size of organization such as director of football, sports director, and others.

== See also ==
- Coach (sport)
- Scout (association football)
