= Robert Bolzon =

Australian rules footballer

Personal information
- Full name: Robert Bolzon
- Born: 19 October 1967 (age 59)
- Original team: Reservoir Colts
- Height: 169 cm (5 ft 7 in)
- Weight: 72 kg (159 lb)

Playing career^{1}
Years	Club	Games (Goals)
1987–1988	Fitzroy	5 (3)
- ^{1} Playing statistics correct to the end of 1988.

Robert Bolzon (born 19 October 1967) is a former Australian rules footballer who represented the Fitzroy Football Club in the Victorian Football League (VFL) during the 1980s.

After just the one game in 1987, Bolzon started 1988 strongly, collecting 22 disposals against St Kilda at Princess Park in round 1, however, was unable to continue this form. He played a further three games that season, before leaving the club at the end of 1988.

He later played for Prahran in the Victorian Football Association, and was runner-up for the J. J. Liston Trophy in 1991 by one vote.
