= Tony Elshaug =

Australian rules footballer and coach

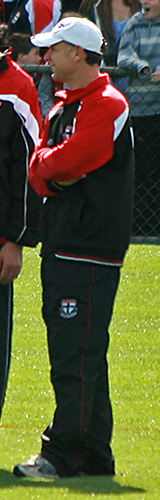

Personal information
- Born: 19 July 1960 (age 66)
- Original team: Bentleigh
- Height: 178 cm (5 ft 10 in)
- Weight: 73 kg (161 lb)

Playing career^{1}
Years	Club	Games (Goals)
1979–1983	Melbourne	66 (92)
1984–1987	Essendon	65 (75)
1988	Collingwood	6 (4)
1990–1991	Dandenong	22 (34)
Total		159 (205)
- ^{1} Playing statistics correct to the end of 1988.

Career highlights
- VFL Premiership player: (1985); VFA Premiership player: (1991); VFA Premiership coach: (1991); Dandenong captain-coach: (1990–1991)

Anthony Elshaug (born 19 July 1960) is a former Australian rules footballer who played for the Melbourne Football Club, Essendon Football Club and Collingwood Football Club in the Victorian Football League (VFL).

Since retiring, he has worked as an assistant coach and recruitment officer at various AFL clubs.

== Playing career ==
A rover, Elshaug made his league debut in 1979 with Melbourne and by the age of 19 was representing Victoria in interstate football. He crossed to Essendon in 1984 and was a member of its 1985 premiership side, kicking 37 goals for the season. After a short stint with Collingwood in 1988 he finished his career in the Victorian Football Association with Dandenong, whom he captain-coached to the 1991 premiership.

== Coaching career ==
After retiring from playing AFL football, Elshaug was a premiership playing coach at Dandenong (VFA) in 1991, then moved straight into a role as regional manager for the Eastern Ranges, in the newly established TAC Cup, which had only just replaced the former VFL/AFL Under 19s competition. After two years at Eastern, Elshaug became an assistant coach to Denis Pagan at the North Melbourne Football Club. He was an assistant under Pagan for thirteen years, at North Melbourne from 1994 until 2002, and then at Carlton Football Club from 2003 until 2006. In 2007, he moved to the St Kilda Football Club. Throughout his coaching career, he has been involved in developmental, senior assistant, and reserves gameday coaching roles. He resigned from his coaching in the middle of the 2010 season for personal reasons, then returned to St Kilda as the recruiting manager in 2011. He stepped down as the List Manager on 15 June 2018.
